= Sonic and the Black Knight =

2009 video game

- North American box art
- Developer: Sonic Team
- Publisher: Sega
- Director: Tetsu Katano
- Producer: Tetsu Katano
- Designer: Morio Kishimoto
- Programmer: Makiko Nishimura
- Artist: Yoshitaka Miura
- Writer: Shiro Maekawa
- Composers: Jun Senoue; Yutaka Minobe; Richard Jacques; Howard Drossin; Tommy Tallarico
- Series: Sonic the Hedgehog
- Platform: Wii
- Release: NA: March 3, 2009; JP/AUS: March 12, 2009; EU: March 13, 2009
- Genres: Platform, hack and slash
- Modes: Single-player, multiplayer

Sonic and the Black Knight (Note: Japanese: ソニックと暗黒の騎士, Hepburn: Sonikku to Ankoku no Kishi; lit. 'Sonic and the Knight of Darkness') is a 2009 platform game developed by Sonic Team and published by Sega for the Wii. A spin-off of the Sonic the Hedgehog series, it is the first and only Sonic video game in the franchise to not include the franchise's main antagonist, Dr. Eggman in any way, as well as the second and final entry in the Sonic Storybook sub-series following Sonic and the Secret Rings (2007), and involves Sonic being transported to the story of King Arthur by wizard Merlina, under the pretense that they are attempting to stop a corrupted Arthur (the Black Knight); however, it is later revealed that there was no corruption and they must stop Merlina's misguided attempt to prevent the legend's fate from occurring. Gameplay involves controlling Sonic around with the Wii Remote's motion-sensing functionality, particularly swinging around the sword to attack enemies and to move forward.

Development on Sonic and the Black Knight began in 2007, shortly after the completion of Secret Rings and involved the designers of both Sonic Adventure 2 (2001) and Sonic Heroes (2003), led by producer Tetsu Katano. Black Knight was conceived as a way to attract new audiences to both the series and the legends of Knights of the Round Table among console users, with Sega holding focus groups to choose which characters would appear in the game. Visually, the game was stylized after Sonic Unleashed (2008) and uses the PhysX engine. Black Knight was revealed in July 2008, and released in March 2009 in all regions. Various composers from the series, particularly Jun Senoue, Richard Jacques and Howard Drossin returned to write the soundtrack.

Sonic and the Black Knight received mixed reviews. Reviewers praised the graphics, presentation, story, and large amounts of bonus content, but criticized the controls, swordplay mechanics, and multiplayer aspects. Black Knight would be among the final games in the series to feature the English voice cast from the Sonic X anime, most of whom would be replaced starting with Sonic Free Riders (2010).

== Gameplay ==
Sonic grinding on the railroad in the Molten Mine

Sonic and the Black Knight is an action-adventure platformer, with elements of hack and slash. The game is primarily played in 3D, however it occasionally transitions to a fixed 2D plane where the player can only move left or right. The game is controlled using the Wii Remote and Nunchuck, with the remote being used to attack or dodge enemies, while the Nunchuck is used to move Sonic around. Like Sonic and the Secret Rings, player movement is limited as the player is on a set path, only being able to strafe left or right, backflipping to reverse, and automatically running forward. However, movement is now controlled with the analog stick.

With the Wiimote, players are able to swing around the Caliburn sword to attack enemies, as well as defending themselves. While travelling through the levels, the player interacts with various fairies which take the attribute of traditional Sonic items, such as springs and speed pads; yellow fairies give the player one to twenty rings, blue fairies increase the player's speed and jump height, and red fairies increases the "Soul Gauge", allowing the player to unleashed a homing Soul Surge attack when filled. Beating stages with a higher rank gives the player better rewards, which can be brought to the blacksmith (Tails) to create new, or upgrade old equipment.

At first, the player can only play as a balanced "Knight" style, but later unlock speed and power-based "Cavalier" and "Paladin" styles. The player will also eventually unlock Sir Gawain (Knuckles the Echidna), Sir Lancelot (Shadow the Hedgehog), and Percival (Blaze the Cat) as playable characters. Each has their own characteristics; for instance, Knuckles wields dual swords that double as boomerangs and has the ability to glide, Blaze can surround herself with fire and use more lunge attacks than Sonic, and Shadow can use Chaos Powers. In story mode, they can use different swords than their own swords, unlike Sonic, who can only wield Caliburn. They are also unable to use the various other styles. In the game's multiplayer, all of the characters as well as 8 others are playable in various minigames.

== Plot ==
A wizard named Merlina, granddaughter of Merlin, attempts to flee from a black knight and his forces. Cornered, she performs a spell calling forth a champion to save her, summoning Sonic the Hedgehog. As they retreat, Merlina explains to Sonic that the black knight is actually King Arthur, who has been corrupted by the immortality granted by Excalibur's scabbard, and that Sonic must defeat him to restore peace to the kingdom. With Sonic's speed alone being insufficient to defeat the King, he takes up the talking sacred sword Caliburn. At Caliburn's suggestion, Sonic meets up with the Lady of the Lake, Nimue (Amy Rose), who tests Sonic to prove he is a worthy Knight. After completing her tasks, Nimue tells him that he must collect the other sacred swords wielded by Lancelot, Gawain, and Percival of the Round Table in order to dispel the immortality granted by Excalibur's scabbard. Defeating each of the Knights, Sonic claims all three swords and challenges the King once more, destroying him.

Sonic takes the scabbard back to Merlina, who reveals that there was never any King Arthur, and what he defeated was an illusion created by her grandfather Merlin, with Merlina manipulating Sonic in order to claim Excalibur's scabbard as her own. Merlina plans to use its power to make the kingdom changeless and eternal in hopes of averting the kingdom's fate from the legends. However, her plan is completely flawed, as such a world, going against the natural order of things, would not function properly, and it would come at the cost of innocent lives. She summons the underworld directly into the kingdom, creating the Dark Hollow and forcing Sonic and the Knights to flee. Nimue explains that the sacred swords can be used to form a barrier to prevent the Dark Hollow's spread, so Sonic and the Knights split up and journey to the kingdom's corners to form the barrier, but it proves to be too weak and the hollow continues to grow.

Sonic enters the Dark Hollow himself to confront Merlina, who has now become the Dark Queen, but she proves too powerful, destroying Caliburn and badly injuring Sonic. Seeing Sonic's continued resolve to stop the witch, Nimue and the Knights give Sonic the power of the sacred swords to restore Caliburn – now revealed to be the true Excalibur – and Sonic transforms into an armored super form called Excalibur Sonic. He defeats Merlina, destroying the Dark Hollow. After the battle, Sonic tells Merlina that, while everything has an end, people should live their lives to the fullest until that day comes. With King Arthur revealed as an illusion, the Knights of the Round Table prepare to disband, but Caliburn reminds them that he is the one who chooses the true king, now revealed to be Sonic.

In a post-credits cutscene, Sonic returns to his world and tells Amy about his adventures, but she believes it to be an excuse for missing their planned date. The game ends in a similar manner to Secret Rings, with the title of the book King Arthur and the Knights of the Round Table changing to Sonic and the Black Knight.

== Development and release ==
Development on Sonic and the Black Knight began shortly after the completion of Sonic and the Secret Rings (2007), Sonic Team began immediate development on its sequel for the Wii, led by Tetsu Katano who was previously the lead programmer behind previous Sonic games, Sonic Adventure 2 (2001) and Sonic Heroes (2003). Since the franchise's demographic largely consisted of children, it was decided that the sequel would focus on that demographic to boost sales; the decision to base the story on Knights of the Round Table was decided on due to wanting to attract new players to both the series and the legend, noting how it had previously influenced the Star Wars franchise. In comparison Sonic Unleashed (2008), which was level design-oriented, Black Knight focused on the combat and cinematic presentation.

During early development, Sega held focus testing in the U.S. to choose the most popular characters from the legend to be used in-game, with the artists adding various attributes of knights to their appearance. This included Blaze the Cat, despite Percival being a male, hence why she is never referred to as "Sir Percival". Like Secret Rings, Sonic and the Black Knight uses the PhysX physics engine, while art director Yoshitaka Miura opted to style the game after Unleashed, unlike the more realistic style of recent games. Yuji Uekawa handled the cutscenes, basing them off the art direction of its predecessor. Katano noted that development was relatively smooth, since they were already aware of the Wii's capabilities after developing Secret Rings.

Sonic and the Black Knight was revealed on July 21, 2008, at Nintendo's pre-Tokyo Game Show (TGS) 2008 press conference. Prior to the game's release, it was playable at both TGS and New York Comic Con. In August 2008, Sega held a contest where fans could submit illustrations, of which 20 would be included in the game's gallery; shortly after release, however, it was discovered one of the winners had plagiarised from another artist. The game released in North America on March 3, 2009, followed by Japan and Oceania on March 12, and Europe on March 13.

=== Audio ===
The music of Sonic and the Black Knight was a large-scale collaboration between Jun Senoue (also acting as sound director), Richard Jacques, Howard Drossin, Tommy Tallarico, Yukata Minobe, Lennie Moore, and Hikaru Tanimoto; it is the first Sonic game Drossin has composed for since Sonic & Knuckles (1994). (Note: Howard Drossin had also composed for Sonic X-treme, which was intended to release in 1996, however it was cancelled due to severe development issues.) Most of the music in the game are in the rock and classical genres, with various remixed tracks from the two Adventure games also making appearances. The five main vocal themes of the game were performed by Senoue's and Johnny Gioeli's band Crush 40 with Marty Friedman, Emma Gelott, and Tinna Karlsdotter providing vocals for "With Me". Tallarico stated he felt honored to help compose the game's soundtrack, having been a Sonic fan since the first game.

Two soundtracks for the game were released by Wave Master Entertainment and Avex Trax on April 8, 2009, in Japan. Face to Faith: Sonic and the Black Knight Vocal Trax contains all five vocal tracks featured in the game, with "Seven Rings in Hand ~Fairytales in Trance~" by Bentley Jones and "With Me ~Massive Power Mix~" as bonus tracks created for the album. The other album, Tales of Knighthood: Sonic and the Black Knight Original Soundtrax featured the rest of the game's soundtrack spread across two discs.

Sonic and the Black Knight was one of the last Sonic games to have the English cast from the Sonic X anime series reprising their roles, provided by 4Kids Entertainment in New York City. With the exception of Mike Pollock, who voices Doctor Eggman, all of the actors were replaced with new ones from Studiopolis in Los Angeles starting with Sonic Free Riders (2010); the Japanese dub features the same actors as other games.

== Reception ==
Reception

Aggregate scores
Aggregator	Score
GameRankings	55%
Metacritic	54/100

Review scores
Publication	Score
1Up.com	C+
Computer and Video Games	5.6/10
Edge	3/10
Eurogamer	4/10
Game Informer	5/10
GamePro	2.5/5
GameSpot	4.5/10
GamesRadar+	3/5
GamesTM	8/10
GameTrailers	5.7/10
GameZone	5.8/10
IGN	3.9/10
Nintendo Life	5/10
Nintendo Power	8/10
Nintendo World Report	6.5/10
Official Nintendo Magazine	78%
VideoGamer.com	5/10
GameDaily	7/10

Sonic and the Black Knight received "mixed or average" reviews, according to the review aggregation website Metacritic. It received a score of 55% on GameRankings. The game entered the Japanese sales chart at 30th place, where it eventually sold 13,446 copies, and the North American Wii charts at tenth. The game received a "Silver" sales award from the Entertainment and Leisure Software Publishers Association (ELSPA), indicating sales of at least 100,000 copies in the United Kingdom.

IGN's Matt Casamassina praised the game's visuals and the overall presentation, but went on to state that the gameplay was "broken" and cited the controls as "unresponsive". GameDaily criticized the "repetitive combat, easy missions and limited controls keep it from greatness," but acknowledged its "attractive presentation, decent combat and bonus content." Chris Scullion from the UK's Official Nintendo Magazine praised the game's visuals and soundtrack, but criticized the swordplay mechanics and multiplayer element. GameSpot's Carolyn Petit noted that, while the sword is useful slashing through enemies, there is a noticeable delay from the time swinging the Wii Remote and the time Sonic actually swings. 1Up.com's Sam Kennedy gave the game a C+ stating, "Black Knight is a competent action game starring Sonic and friends, but one that's replaced the classic gameplay Sonic fans seek with overly simple swordplay. It'll do the trick just fine for younger players still infatuated with the blue porcupine, but everyone else will likely be just as let down as I was." Videogamer.com gave the game a 5 out of 10 which read, "Even if you accept that the Sonic games aren't built for hardcore gamers, that they're now designed to appeal to the mainstream, that's no reason to accept shoddy gameplay."

== Legacy ==
In the lead-up to the release of Sonic the Hedgehog 4: Episode I and Sonic Colors, it was reported that Sega would be delisting all Sonic games with a below average Metacritic rating from retailers—Black Knight included—in order to increase the value of the brand. A few days later, Sega of America's VP Alan Pritchard would dispel this as an exaggeration, but admitted that they had been bringing too many substandard Sonic games to market. Takashi Iizuka would express regret in implementing the sword mechanics to Nintendo Power, feeling that they clashed with Sonic's core design rather than complimenting it.

Shortly after the release of Black Knight, Sega held a poll on Facebook what theme players would prefer in a follow-up, though clarified that not meant to be indicative of future plans. While a third Storybook game was teased by a Sega Mexico representative, no further developments came, with Game Informer describing the subseries as having been abandoned in 2026.
