= Team Sonic =

Team Sonic may refer to:

- Sonic Team, the developer of the Sonic the Hedgehog franchise
- A team in the 2003 video game Sonic Heroes
- Team Sonic Racing, a 2019 video game
- Camelot Software Planning, a video game developer previously known as Sonic Co. and Sonic Software Planning
