= Jun Senoue =

Japanese musician (born 1970)

- 瀬上 純
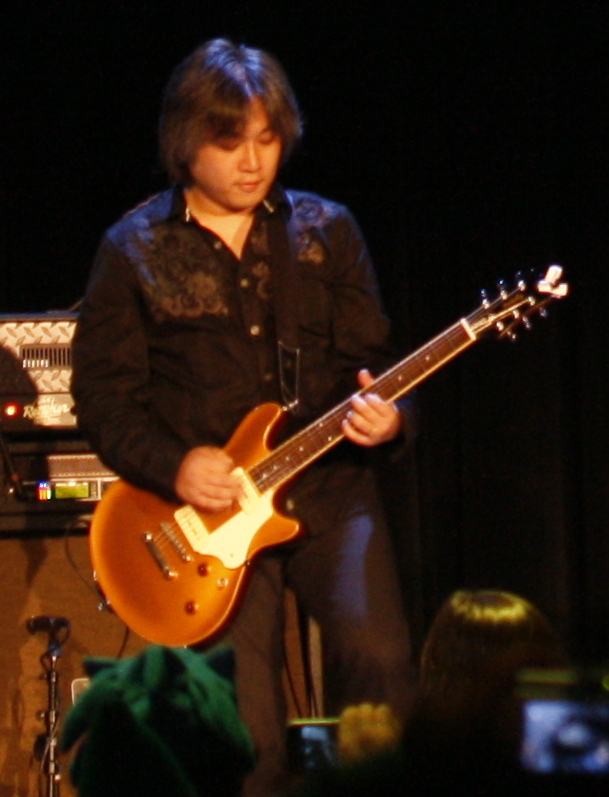
- Senoue in 2011
- Born: August 2, 1970 (age 56); Matsushima, Miyagi, Japan
- Education: Aoyama Gakuin University
- Occupations: Composer; guitarist; recording coordinator
- Years active: 1993–present
- Employer: Sega
- Musical career
- Genres: Video game music; hard rock; electronic rock
- Instruments: Guitar; keyboards
- Label: Wave Master
- Member of: Crush 40

Jun Senoue (瀬上 純, Senoue Jun; born August 2, 1970) is a Japanese composer and guitarist. He is a sound director for the Sonic the Hedgehog video game series by Sega and is also the songwriter of the rock duo Crush 40 which has contributed music to the series as well.

== Biography ==
Senoue was born on August 2, 1970, in Matsushima, Miyagi, Japan, and started playing the piano at the age of three. After moving to Panama at the age of 12, he became dedicated to rock music after being exposed to MTV. He began to teach himself to play the electric guitar at the age of 15, and made his first original band recording by the age of 17. After graduating from college with a degree in economics from Aoyama Gakuin University in 1993, Senoue sent demo tapes to Namco and Sega, the latter of whom hired him. His first project with the company was on Dark Wizard, where he arranged a medley of the game's music for its staff roll. In 1993, he wrote a few jingles and music tracks for the videogames Sonic the Hedgehog 3 and Sonic & Knuckles, his first involvements in the Sonic series. After doing multiple projects in the Sega Worldwide Soccer series in the mid-1990s and other games such as the Sega Genesis version of Sonic 3D Blast, Senoue was selected to be the lead composer and sound director of Sonic Adventure in 1998. The game's success led to him being promoted as series sound director.

Senoue moved to San Francisco in 1999 and began to work on Sonic Team USA games such as NASCAR Arcade, Sonic Adventure 2, Sonic Heroes, and Shadow the Hedgehog. In 2005, Senoue released an EP with Japanese voice actress Junko Noda, titled "Ready!". The project went under the name JxJ, and was only available to purchase in Japan. In 2007, Senoue provided three new arrangements for the Japanese console release of OutRun 2 SP, including covers of existing series tracks "Splash Wave" and "Rush a Difficulty", and an original track titled "Lift You Up!". Also in 2007, Senoue arranged and performed "Angel Island Zone" from Sonic the Hedgehog 3 for Super Smash Bros. Brawl. In 2010, Senoue performed several gigs in Tokyo with former Magna-Fi guitarist, C.J. Szuter, in a band called Bubblicious Blvd.

In 2009, Senoue announced a compilation album titled The Works. Containing only three Sonic related songs, it mostly features more obscure works he provided for other games. The album was released on October 21, 2009. At a Sonic festival at Joypolis in December 2015, Senoue announced a sequel to The Works, titled The Works II, which released two months later.

=== Crush 40 ===
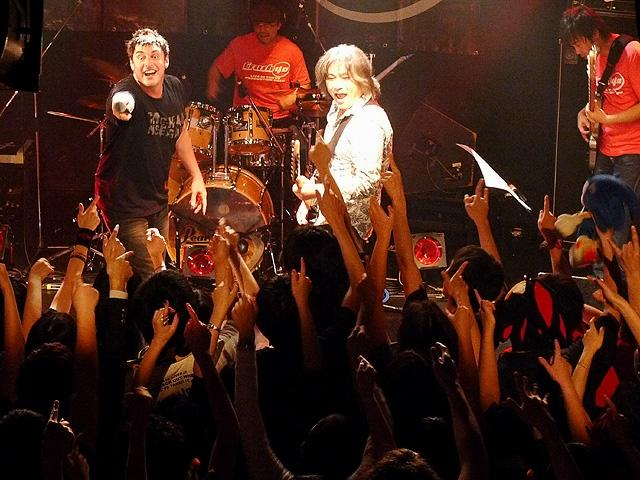
Senoue (center) performing as Crush 40, 2012

Crush 40 is a hard rock band originally formed by Senoue in 2000 to perform on NASCAR Arcade. It consists of Senoue on guitars, Johnny Gioeli on vocals, Toru Kawamura on drums, and Takeshi Taneda on bass. Since its inception, the band has created several theme songs for the Sonic the Hedgehog series. In October 2008, Crush 40 took the stage at the Tokyo Game Show to perform some of their most popular Sonic based songs in front of a live audience for the first time. Gioeli and Senoue have since created a YouTube account and uploaded video footage of the event. In 2009, a new Crush 40 album was released titled The Best of Crush 40: Super Sonic Songs. The compilation contained most of the band's Sonic releases, as well as a mixture of old tracks from NASCAR Arcade and brand new songs. Crush 40 performed at the August 2010 Summer of Sonic convention in London, marking their first performance outside of Japan. In 2012, the band performed at two conventions, at the Summer of Sonic in Brighton and at the Sonic Boom event at San Diego Comic-Con.

The band released their first live album in October 2012, titled Live!, which featured songs from their concerts in Tokyo. In August 2013, the band performed in St. Louis for the Sonic Boom 2013 event, and also performed at the 2015 Youmacon in Detroit. For the 25th anniversary of the Sonic series, Crush 40 performed at the San Diego House of Blues during Comic-Con in July 2016 and at Summer of Sonic in London the following month. At the 2017 Comic-Con in July, Senoue performed various Sonic material with the Video Game Orchestra. Crush 40 also contributed to 2019's Team Sonic Racing, performing its main theme "Green Light Ride".

== Works ==
Video games
Year	Title	Role(s)
1993	Dark Wizard	Ending theme
1994	Sonic the Hedgehog 3	Music with several others
1994	Game no Kanzume	Arrangements
1994	Formula One World Championship: Beyond the Limit	Music with several others
1994	Sonic & Knuckles	Music with several others
1995	Victory Goal	Music
1995	Metal Head	Music with Teruhiko Nakagawa
1995	Sega International Victory Goal	Music
1995	F1 Challenge	Sound effects
1995	In the Hunt	Music with Masahiro Ito; Sega Saturn version
1996	J. League Victory Goal '96	Music
1996	Sega Worldwide Soccer 97	Music with Seirou Okamoto
1996	Sonic 3D Blast	Music with Tatsuyuki Maeda; Sega Genesis version
1996	Daytona USA: Championship Circuit Edition	Music with Richard Jacques, Kenichi Tokoi, and Tomonori Sawada
1997	Sega Worldwide Soccer '98	Music with several others
1998	Sega Rally 2	"Soul on Desert"
1998	Sonic Adventure	Lead composer
2000	NASCAR Arcade	Music
2001	Sonic Adventure 2	Lead composer
2003	Let's Make a Pro Baseball Team! 2	Music
2003	Sonic Heroes	Lead composer
2005	Let's Make a Pro Baseball Team! 3	Music
2005	Shadow the Hedgehog	Lead composer
2006	Sega Rally 2006	Music with several others
2006	Sonic Rivals	Sound supervision
2006	Sonic the Hedgehog	Vocal track production
2007	Let's Make a Pro Baseball Team! 5	Music
2007	OutRun 2 SP	Music with Mitsuharu Fukuyama
2007	Burnout Running	Guitars
2007	Sonic Rivals 2	"Race to Win"; sound supervisor
2007	Nights: Journey of Dreams	"Nights and Reala: Theme of a Tragedic Revenge"
2008	Super Smash Bros. Brawl	"Angel Island Zone"
2008	Sonic Unleashed	Vocal track coordination
2009	Sonic and the Black Knight	Lead composer
2009	Mario & Sonic at the Olympic Winter Games	Arrangements with Teruhiko Nakagawa; Wii version
2010	Super Monkey Ball: Step & Roll	Vocal track coordination
2010	Sonic the Hedgehog 4: Episode I	Music
2010	Sonic Free Riders	"Free"
2010	Sonic Colors	Vocal track coordination
2011	Sonic Generations	Lead composer; arrangements with several others
2011	Mario & Sonic at the London 2012 Olympic Games	Music with several others
2012	Sonic the Hedgehog 4: Episode II	Music
2013	Let's Make a Soccer Team!	Music; guitars and keyboards
2013	Mario & Sonic at the Sochi 2014 Olympic Winter Games	Arrangements with several others
2014	Uta Kumi 575	Sound; arranged "Spirited Away"
2014	Dengeki Bunko: Fighting Climax	Music with several others
2015	Dengeki Bunko: Fighting Climax Ignition	Music with several others
2016	Mario & Sonic at the Rio 2016 Olympic Games	Music with several others
2016	Yakyuu Tsuku!!	Guitars
2016	Maimai Pink Plus	"Nitrous Fury"
2016	Puyo Puyo Chronicle	Arrangements with Naofumi Hataya, Kenichi Tokoi, and Tomonori Sawada
2017	Sonic Mania	Audio engineering
2017	Sonic Forces	Guitars; recording coordination
2018	Puyo Puyo Champions	Arrangements
2018	Super Smash Bros. Ultimate	"Mega Man 4 Medley"
2019	Team Sonic Racing	Lead composer
2019	Olympic Games Tokyo 2020 - The Official Video Game	Music with Kenichi Tokoi and Tomonori Sawada
2019	Mario & Sonic at the Olympic Games Tokyo 2020	Sound editing
2020	Sonic at the Olympic Games - Tokyo 2020	Music with Hidekuni Horita, Kenichi Tokoi, and Tomoya Ohtani
2021	Sonic Colors: Ultimate	Arrangements with Tomoya Ohtani and Kenichi Tokoi
2022	Sonic Origins	Sound director; Sonic 3 music adaptations
2022	Sonic Frontiers	Recording coordination
2023	Sonic Superstars	Sound director; music
2024	Shadow Generations	Sound director
2025	Sonic Racing: CrossWorlds	Music with several others

Other / Crush 40
Year	Album	Notes
2000	Thrill of the Feel	With Crush 40 as "Sons of Angels"
2003	Crush 40	With Crush 40
2005	Ready!	Music with Junko Noda
2009	Ted Poley's Greatestits Vol. 1	"Takoyaki Rock"
2009	The Works	
2009	The Best of Crush 40: Super Sonic Songs	Compilation, with Crush 40
2009	Leaving the End Open	Guitars on "Before This" by Hardline
2011	Rise Again	EP, with Crush 40
2012	Live!	Live album, with Crush 40
2015	2 Nights 2 Remember	Live album, with Crush 40
2016	The Works II	
2019	The Works III	
2019	Driving Through Forever -The Ultimate Crush 40 Collection-	Compilation, with Crush 40
