= Crush 40 =

Japanese-American rock band

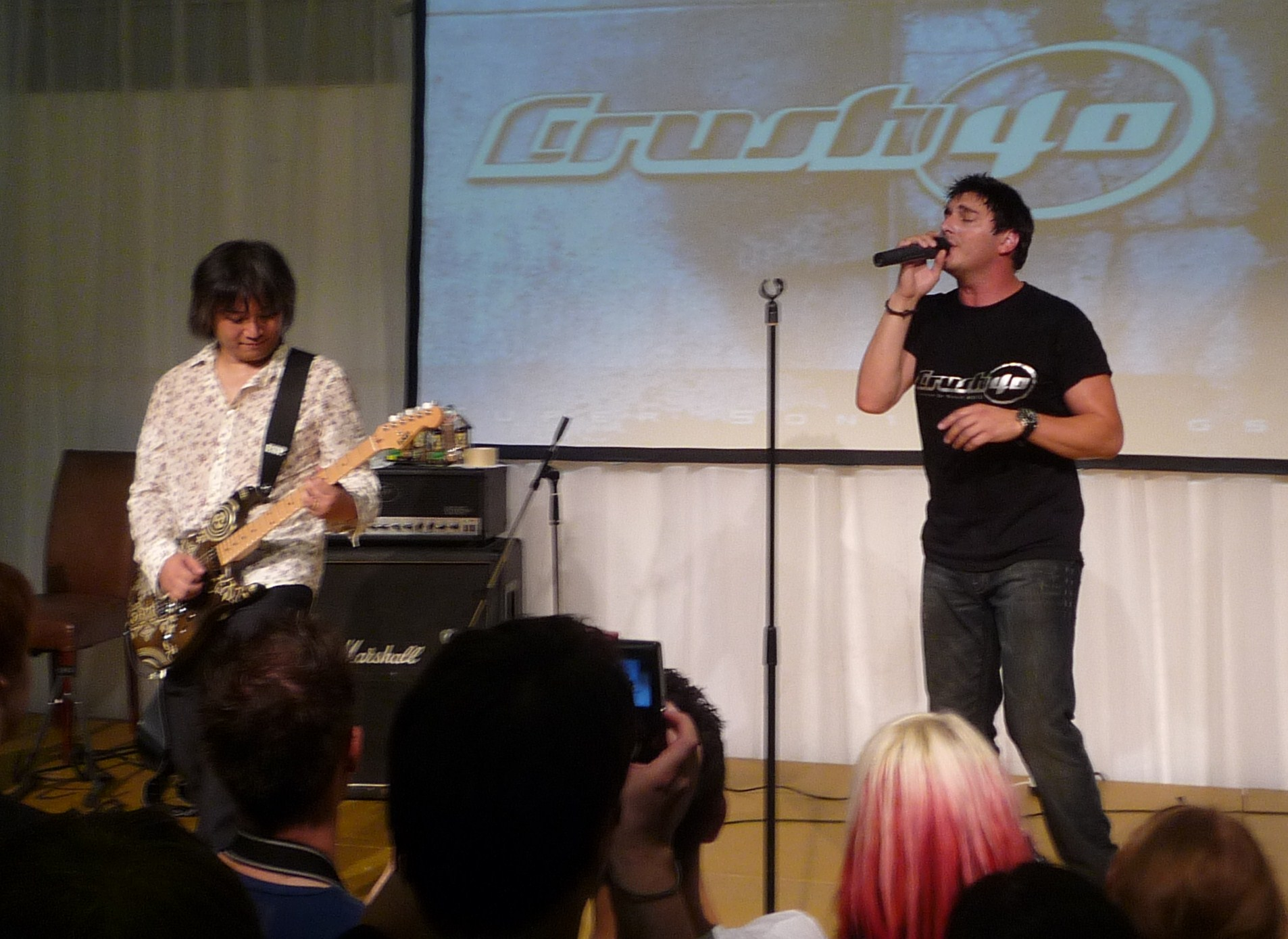
- Crush 40 performing at Summer of Sonic 2010 in London. From left: Jun Senoue and Johnny Gioeli

Background information
- Also known as: Sons of Angels
- Origin: Japan, United States
- Genres: Hard rock; video game music
- Years active: 1998–present
- Labels: Wave Master; Frontiers; Victor
- Members: Jun Senoue; Johnny Gioeli

Crush 40 is a hard rock band consisting of Japanese guitarist and composer Jun Senoue and American vocalist Johnny Gioeli. The band produced most soundtracks for the Sonic the Hedgehog series in the 2000s.

Senoue has been employed by Sega as a composer since 1993. While preparing music for Sonic Adventure (1998), he contacted Gioeli to perform the theme song, "Open Your Heart". They also recorded the soundtrack for NASCAR Arcade under the name Sons of Angels, which was released in Japan as the album Thrill of the Feel (2000). Senoue and Gioeli continued recording music for Sonic games and their own projects.

Crush 40 has released two studio albums, two live albums, two compilations, an EP, and individual tracks, mostly under Sega's Wave Master label. Their style of hard rock, considered by some to be a continuation of glam rock, has created a legacy with Sonic fans.

== History ==
=== Formation, Thrill of the Feel, and Crush 40 ===
After graduating from college, Jun Senoue was hired by Sega in 1993 to compose music for video games. His first project in the Sonic the Hedgehog series was Sonic the Hedgehog 3 & Knuckles (1994), and he also contributed to Dark Wizard, Sonic 3D Blast, and Sega Rally 2. For Daytona USA: Championship Circuit Edition, Senoue worked with Eric Martin of Mr. Big to record the main theme, "Sons of Angels". Senoue said he brought a rock music feel to the games he worked on, including the Sonic the Hedgehog series, because he is a "rock guy".

In 1998, Senoue contacted vocalist Johnny Gioeli during the recording process for Sonic Adventure and recorded their first song, "Open Your Heart". Senoue first recorded a demo with Eizo Sakamoto on vocals, but Senoue wrote the song assuming Gioeli would sing it. According to Gioeli, Senoue was a fan of Gioeli's band Hardline and connected with him via Doug Aldrich, the guitarist for Whitesnake. After making the track, the two stayed in contact, having enjoyed working together and wanting to do more. Senoue and Gioeli worked together again on songs for NASCAR Arcade. In addition to Senoue and Gioeli, Naoto Shibata played bass and Hirotsugu Homma of Loudness played drums, and the group took the name Sons of Angels, from the title of the song Senoue recorded with Eric Martin. In 2000, the band released Thrill of the Feel in Japan, published by Victor Entertainment. The album contained the tracks they had written for NASCAR Arcade, along with "Open Your Heart".

During the development of Sonic Adventure 2, Senoue and Gioeli reunited to record the title track, "Live & Learn". As Shibata and Homma were busy performing with Loudness and later Anthem, Takeshi Taneda was brought in to play bass, and Katsuji Kirita from Gargoyle and the Cro-Magnons played drums. According to Vice, "Live & Learn" is one of Gioeli's favorite songs. Senoue recorded the intro to the song for the game's trial edition; he worked on the rest of the arrangement later and completed it within one day. He then sent a demo to Gioeli to record his vocals. Gioeli was given the task of writing the lyrics for "Live & Learn". He initially was nervous and asked Senoue if his lyrics were okay on multiple occasions, but despite this, "Live & Learn" became one of the most memorable songs on the Sonic Adventure 2 soundtrack according to Sean Aitchison of Fanbyte, and even appearing in the third Sonic The Hedgehog movie.

Around this time, the band was renamed Crush 40, after discovering that there was a Norwegian rock band already named Sons of Angels. When asked why he chose "Crush 40", Senoue said, "When we had to pick one, we chose the word we like... 'Crush' is one of them, and Johnny added the number. Crush is the name of the soda too... that's my favorite!" Gioeli added that his inspiration for the title was a desire to "crush" his forties, which he was approaching at the time. Two years after the 2001 release of Sonic Adventure 2, the album Crush 40 was released by Frontiers Records. The album contained the vocal tracks from NASCAR Arcade, Sonic Adventure and Sonic Adventure 2. According to Senoue, Crush 40 is specifically the band of himself and Gioeli, though tracks "It Doesn't Matter" and "Escape from the City" (sung by Tony Harnell and Ted Poley, respectively) were included on the album. Senoue explained this was done to exhibit these songs to fans.

=== Recordings for Sega and The Best of Crush 40: Super Sonic Songs ===
In 2003, Crush 40 composed two new songs entitled "Sonic Heroes" and "What I'm Made Of..." for Sega's Sonic Heroes, the first multiplatform Sonic game. Both Senoue and Gioeli have called "What I'm Made Of..." their favorite song to perform. For Shadow the Hedgehog in 2005, Crush 40 recorded "I Am... All of Me", as well as "Never Turn Back". The drums for both songs were recorded by Toru Kawamura. Additionally, Crush 40 recorded covers of songs used in 2006's Sonic the Hedgehog, Sonic and the Secret Rings, Sonic Riders and Zero Gravity, and Sonic CD. The band also recorded five original songs and a cover for Sonic and the Black Knight.

In October 2008, Crush 40 performed live for the first time, at the Tokyo Game Show, with Senoue and Gioeli performing with backing tracks. A year later, Senoue revealed to Famitsu that Crush 40 had two albums in the works, including a best-of album, due for release in September 2009. He also announced the release of future songs that were not written for video games. The Best of Crush 40 – Super Sonic Songs was released on November 18, 2009. In addition to compiling various Crush 40 songs from previous games, the album featured a new song, "Is It You", and a cover of "Fire Woman", a 1989 song by the Cult. Senoue was also credited as a soloist on "Before This", a song from the 2009 Hardline album Leaving the End Open.

=== Rise Again, Live!, 2 Nights 2 Remember, and Driving Through Forever ===
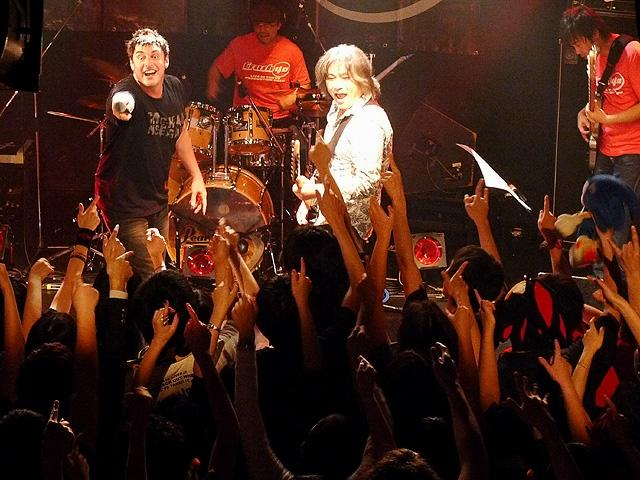
Crush 40 performing in Tokyo in 2012

After the 2010 release of Sonic Free Riders, Crush 40's contributions to Sonic the Hedgehog decreased. Senoue was no longer lead composer on games in the Sonic series after 2011's Sonic Generations. During the next few years, Crush 40 made more live performances and recordings. In 2010, Crush 40 performed live at the Summer of Sonic convention. In 2011, Crush 40 recorded the single, "Song of Hope", as inspiration for hope for victims of the 2011 Tōhoku earthquake and tsunami. According to Senoue, the song was written for charity, specifically for the Red Cross. Subsequently, "Song of Hope" and three new songs were released as an EP called Rise Again. One of the included songs, "Sonic Youth", pays tribute to Crush 40's fans with numerous references to the band's past songs.

On March 29 and 30, 2012, Crush 40 performed live at Shibuya GUILTY in Tokyo, with Sonic Team producer Takashi Iizuka in the audience. From this concert, performed with Taneda and Kawamura, Crush 40's first live album Live! was recorded, and was released on October 3, 2012. The band also performed at the St. Louis Sonic Boom Festival in August 2013, Detroit’s Youmacon anime convention at the Renaissance Center in 2015, and performed additional shows at the Summer of Sonic convention in 2012 and 2016, and San Diego Comic-Con conventions in 2016 and 2017. After more live performances at the Tokyo Game Show and Japan Game Music Festival, Crush 40 was announced for another two-night performance in 2014 at Shibuya GUILTY. For the concert, Senoue and Gioeli were joined by Taneda and Katsuji. The concert featured two new songs, as well as a performance of Hardline's "Love Leads the Way". Recorded from that performance, 2 Nights 2 Remember, Crush 40's second live album, was released on May 13, 2015. It features four additional studio-recorded songs.

In 2018, Senoue was named lead composer for the soundtrack for Team Sonic Racing. He was requested to make the game's theme a song by Crush 40. This led to Senoue and Gioeli recording "Green Light Ride" for the game, Crush 40's first Sonic game theme in several years. The song was premiered at E3 2018, to a stronger reaction than Senoue expected. A short version of the song was made available in December 2018, before the 2019 release of the game itself. Senoue expressed his joy at being able to record another game theme with Crush 40, twenty years after Crush 40 began. Subsequently, Crush 40 released another compilation album, Driving Through Forever, in 2019, with a new track titled Call me Crazy. In 2020, Gioeli re-recorded "Song of Hope" with Bulgarian vocalist Sevi, as a way of reconnecting with fans during the coronavirus pandemic. On June 23, 2021, Sega held the Sonic the Hedgehog 30th Anniversary Symphony with Crush 40 as one of the participating acts.

In February 2024, following the use of its instrumental in a teaser, Gioeli confirmed that "Live & Learn" would be featured in Sonic the Hedgehog 3. He said that how the song is used is ultimately up to producers. The song was ultimately used in the movie's climax and its riffs were used as a leitmotif for the character of Shadow. In December 2024, Gioeli sued Sega of America, claiming ownership of the master recording and co-ownership of the composition of "Live & Learn." Gioeli demanded $1 million in damages and restitution for the song's unauthorized use in more than two dozen subsequent releases, including ports of Sonic Adventure 2 and the Japanese version of the Sonic X anime. On August 28, 2025, the lawsuit was dismissed with prejudice in favor of Sega. On September 22, 2025, Gioeli publicly revealed the outcome on social media.

== Musical style and legacy ==
According to Allegra Frank and Philip Kollar of Polygon, Crush 40 and Senoue have made "some of the most memorable butt rock tracks from Sonic history (and the history of video games in general)". In Vice, Andy McDonald wrote that Crush 40 helped to keep glam rock alive after grunge had supplanted it as a more popular style of rock music. Reviewing the album Crush 40, Chris Greening of Video Game Music Online highlights the hard rock sound and showing of Gioeli's experience in the vocals, stating that "Live & Learn" is "an ecstatic Americana rock anthem featuring Johnny at his best", while also stating the instrumentals are inspired by early 1990s heavy metal. He calls the album "among the best of the genre in game music".

Gioeli, who is not a gamer, described his songwriting process with Senoue for games as being akin to writing a soundtrack for a movie, watching scenes from the game or looking at storyboards. According to Gioeli, "Jun and I have our system—he starts with a musical feeling and sometimes a melody idea and then I go nuts with it! The lyrics do have to be approved for content, but that's it. We have the freedom to write what we feel is the right song for the scene." He has stated that among his three main projects—Crush 40, Hardline, and performing with Axel Rudi Pell—all three are different styles of rock music and he has to set himself in the "right emotions" to perform.

When interviewed about his style and that of the band, Jun Senoue said, "I know what my style is, and I know what my favourite genres of music are. I listen to a lot of metal music, as well as other genres of music, and my inspiration is always there. The style of the music in the game does change, and it gives a great sense of progression... When we got together to write stuff for Shadow [the Hedgehog], we found that our fresh ideas were a lot different to the songs we'd written back in 2002 – our sound had changed." Senoue has stated that the tempo of each song written for a game is based on how it is planned to be used and what would be suitable, but those songs not for a game are what the duo want to perform.

Writing for Fanbyte, Sean Aitchison stated that Crush 40 provided a signature musical style for the Sonic the Hedgehog series and expanded the musical tastes of Sonic fans. According to Aitchison, "The band embedded themselves in the memories and hearts of an entire generation of Sonic fans. Though their contributions to the Sonic franchise may be small in number, they are massive in impact." Kofi-Charu Nat Turner's 2008 study of media usage in an American urban middle school listed the band as a common interest within the group studied.

== Band members ==
=== Current ===
- Johnny Gioeli - Vocals (1998-present)
- Jun Senoue – lead guitar (1998–present)

=== Former ===
- Naoto Shibata – drums (1998-2001)
- Hirotsugu Homma – drums (1998–2001)
- Katsuji Kirita – drums (2001–2005)
- Mark Schulman – drums (2003)
- Toru Kawamura – drums (2005-2016)
- Bobby Jarzombek – drums (2009; touring/session)

=== Live / Touring Members ===
- Takeshi Taneda - bass (2001-present)
- Akht. - drums (2019-present)
- Gianni Pontillo - co vocals (2026)

=== Guest / Session Vocalist ===
- Tony Harnell - It Doesn't Matter (Sonic Adventure Era)
- Ted Poley - Escape From The City (?)

== Discography ==
Year	Album	Publisher	Type	Ref.
2000	Thrill of the Feel (as Sons of Angels)	Victor Entertainment	Studio album	
2003	Crush 40	Frontiers Records	Studio album	
2009	The Best of Crush 40: Super Sonic Songs	Wave Master	Compilation	
2011	Rise Again		EP	
2012	Live!		Live album	
2015	2 Nights 2 Remember		Live album	
2019	Driving Through Forever	Wave Master	Compilation	

== Games ==
Year	Game	Song(s)	Ref.
1998	Sonic Adventure	"Open Your Heart"	
2000	NASCAR Arcade	"Revvin' Up"; "Into the Wind"; "In the Lead"; "Fuel Me"; "Dangerous Ground"; "All the Way"; "Watch Me Fly..."	
2001	Sonic Adventure 2	"Live & Learn"	
2003	Sonic Heroes	"Sonic Heroes"; "What I'm Made Of..."	
2005	Shadow the Hedgehog	"I Am... All of Me"; "Never Turn Back"	
2006	Sonic the Hedgehog	"All Hail Shadow" (Note: Cover of "All Hail Shadow" by Magna-Fi, originally in Shadow the Hedgehog); "His World" (Note: Cover of "His World" by Ali Tabatabaee and Matty Lewis of Zebrahead. Soundtrack release only.)	
2008	Super Smash Bros. Brawl	"Open Your Heart"; "Live & Learn"; "Sonic Heroes"	
2009	Sonic and the Black Knight	"Knight of the Wind"; "Live Life"; "Fight the Knight"; "Through the Fire"; "With Me" (Note: Written by Crush 40 and performed by Emma Gelotte and Tinna Karlsdotte of All Ends. A "Massive Power Mix" version by Crush 40 is on the soundtrack only.); "Seven Rings in Hand" (Note: Cover of "Seven Rings in Hand" by Steve Conte, originally from Sonic and the Secret Rings.)	
2010	Sonic Free Riders	"Free" (Note: Written by Crush 40 and performed by Chris Madin. A version performed by Crush 40 is on the soundtrack only.)	
2011	Sonic Generations	"Open Your Heart" (Crush 40 vs. Circuit Freq remix)	
2014	Super Smash Bros. for Nintendo 3DS and Wii U	"Open Your Heart"; "Live & Learn" (Note: "Live & Learn" is the only track available in for Nintendo 3DS; all other tracks are in for Wii U and Ultimate only.); "Sonic Heroes"; "Knight of the Wind"	
2018	Super Smash Bros. Ultimate	"Open Your Heart"; "Live & Learn"; "Sonic Heroes"; "Knight of the Wind"	
2019	Team Sonic Racing	"Green Light Ride"	
2022	Sonic Frontiers	"Open Your Heart"; "Live & Learn"; "Sonic Heroes"; "Knight Of The Wind	
2024	Shadow Generations	"Boss Battle: Metal Overlord (What I'm Made Of...)"; "Boss Battle: Neo Devil Doom (All Hail Shadow - Symphonic ver.)"	
