= Sonic Colors =

2010 video game

- North American cover art
- Developer: Sonic Team (Note: Nintendo DS version developed by Dimps. Sonic Colors Ultimate developed by Blind Squirrel Games in collaboration with Sonic Team.)
- Publisher: Sega
- Directors: Morio Kishimoto (Wii); Takao Hirabayashi (DS)
- Producers: Takashi Iizuka; Hiroyuki Kawano (DS)
- Designers: Morio Kishimoto (Wii); Takayuki Okada (Wii); Yuka Kobayashi (DS)
- Programmers: Yoshitaka Kawabata (Wii); Takashi Yamatani (DS)
- Artist: Sachiko Kawamura
- Writers: Ken Pontac; Warren Graff; Yasushi Otake
- Composers: Tomoya Ohtani; Kenichi Tokoi; Fumie Kumatani; Hideaki Kobayashi; Mariko Nanba; Naofumi Hataya
- Series: Sonic the Hedgehog
- Engine: Godot (Ultimate)
- Platforms: Wii; Nintendo DS; Nintendo Switch; PlayStation 4; Windows; Xbox One
- Release: Wii, Nintendo DS: AU: November 11, 2010; EU: November 12, 2010; NA: November 16, 2010; JP: November 18, 2010; Ultimate; Nintendo Switch, PS4, Windows, Xbox One: WW: September 7, 2021; JP/AS: September 9, 2021
- Genre: Platform
- Modes: Single-player, multiplayer

Sonic Colors (Note: Japanese: ソニックカラーズ, Hepburn: Sonikku Karāzu) (known as Sonic Colours in PAL regions) is a 2010 platform game developed by Sonic Team and published by Sega. It follows Sonic's quest to stop his nemesis Doctor Eggman from enslaving an alien race and taking over the world. The gameplay is similar to prior Sonic games, with players collecting rings and defeating enemies; the camera perspective often switches from third-person to side-scrolling perspectives. The game also introduces Wisps, power-ups the player can use to increase attack power and reach new areas.

Development of Sonic Colors began in 2008, following the completion of Sonic Unleashed. Examining criticisms of past games, the developers made Sonic the only playable character and worked to balance speed and platforming; the Wisps were introduced to diversify the gameplay without slowing it down. Two versions of the game were developed: one for the Wii by Sonic Team, and one for the Nintendo DS by Dimps. The game was designed for a wider demographic than previous games, specifically children and fans of the Super Mario series. In anticipation of the game's release, Sega delisted several Sonic games with sub-average Metacritic scores to increase the value of the brand.

Sonic Colors received generally positive reviews from critics, who praised its graphics, audio, soundtrack, gameplay and replay value, with many considering it a return to form for the series. However, some criticized its difficulty and multiplayer mode. It was a commercial success, selling four million copies. The Wisp power-ups introduced in Sonic Colors became a staple of the Sonic series.

A remastered edition of the Wii version, Sonic Colors: Ultimate, (Note: Japanese: ソニックカラーズ アルティメット, Hepburn: Sonikku Karāzu Arutimetto; known as Sonic Colours: Ultimate in English-speaking PAL regions) was released on September 7, 2021, for Nintendo Switch, PlayStation 4, Windows, and Xbox One as part of the Sonic series' 30th anniversary.

== Gameplay ==
=== Premise and setting ===
Gameplay screenshot of Sonic Colors, showing Sonic in one of the game's levels

Sonic Colors is a platform game set in outer space. Players control Sonic the Hedgehog, whose goal is to save the Wisps, an alien race that has been enslaved by Doctor Eggman. The game's main hub is Doctor Eggman's Incredible Interstellar Amusement Park, an interplanetary amusement park that consists of five small planets chained to each other. Sonic must be guided through these planets to destroy the power source at their center.

Each planet is split into seven parts: six main levels called acts and a boss level. In each act, players must guide Sonic to the goal, whilst defeating enemies and dodging obstacles. In boss levels, players face one of Eggman's large robots, and must defeat it. Gameplay seamlessly shifts between side-scrolling and third-person perspectives. Upon completion of a level, players are given a grade dependent on their performance, with an "S" being the best and a "D" being the worst. As the player progresses through the game, more planets become available to select. Once each planet has been completed, a bonus seventh, which concludes the story, is unlocked.

Players control Sonic using the Wii Remote (with or without the Nunchuk), the Classic Controller, or the GameCube controller. Sonic retains most of his abilities from Sonic Unleashed: he can perform a "Sonic Boost" which greatly increases his speed and allows him to smash through various objects; a homing attack that allows him to destroy enemies from long distances; and a stomp that enables him to quickly destroy objects below him. In certain levels, players are sent at high speeds and must perform a quick step maneuver to dodge walls and other hazards; others see Sonic using a drift mechanic in order to make sharp turns. Sonic is also given a double-jump ability, which allows him to perform an additional jump in mid-air.

Sonic uses the Orange Rocket, one of the eight Wisps in Sonic Colors.

A major aspect of Sonic Colors is the ability to activate Wisp power-ups. There are eight different types of Wisps, each with their own unique advantage dependent on their color. Normal white-colored Wisps allow the player to get a speed boost at any time. The "Cyan Laser" turns Sonic into a laser that can bounce off solid surfaces to change the laser's path and to travel through power lines, while the "Yellow Drill" allows Sonic to drill through soft ground and water. The "Orange Rocket" allows Sonic to blast upward to tremendous heights; the "Pink Spikes" allows Sonic to bond to walls and ceilings and to perform a spin dash to gain velocity and to destroy objects; the "Green Hover" enables Sonic to hover and to perform dashes across lines of rings; the "Blue Cube" gives Sonic the ability to turn blue blocks into blue rings and vice versa; and the "Purple Frenzy" turns Sonic into a berserker that chomps through anything in its path, increasing in size as it continues to eat.

Like previous games, Sonic collects golden rings, which protect him from a single hit by an enemy or obstacle, though they will scatter and blink before disappearing. Sonic starts the game with a limited number of lives; if he is hit with no rings in his possession, he will lose a life. If a player exhausts their lives, they will receive a game over.

=== Multiplayer ===
Sonic Colors features a co-operative two-player mode, Eggman's Sonic Simulator, in which players control Sonic-modeled robots or their Mii characters through a series of levels. These levels can be unlocked by collecting special Red Star Rings hidden throughout each act. Completing Sonic Simulator levels rewards the player Chaos Emeralds, and once all seven are collected, Sonic can transform into Super Sonic after collecting 50 rings in normal levels. As Super Sonic, players are invincible and can boost infinitely, though they cannot use Wisps and lose one ring per second, de-transforming when the ring counter hits zero. The game also features online leaderboards, allowing players to upload their scores via Nintendo Wi-Fi Connection.

=== Nintendo DS ===
A version of Sonic Colors (pictured) was developed by Dimps for the Nintendo DS.

Unlike the Wii version, the Nintendo DS version of Sonic Colors is a side-scroller reminiscent of the original Sega Genesis/Mega Drive games (similar to the style of Sonic Rush and Rush Adventure) that takes advantage of the system's dual-screen. Exclusive to the DS version are touchscreen-controlled special stages similar to the ones seen in Sonic the Hedgehog 2, missions featuring various characters from throughout the franchise, a competitive multiplayer mode, and an extra final boss. The game features two new Wisp types in exchange for the Frenzy, Hover, Spikes, and Cube: "Red Burst", which allows Sonic to burst in midair and can activate certain objects such as a hot air balloon, Ferris wheel, and popcorn cannons; and "Violet Void", which gives Sonic the ability to float and to suck up nearby objects, growing bigger in the process. Unlockable concept art is also included.

== Plot ==
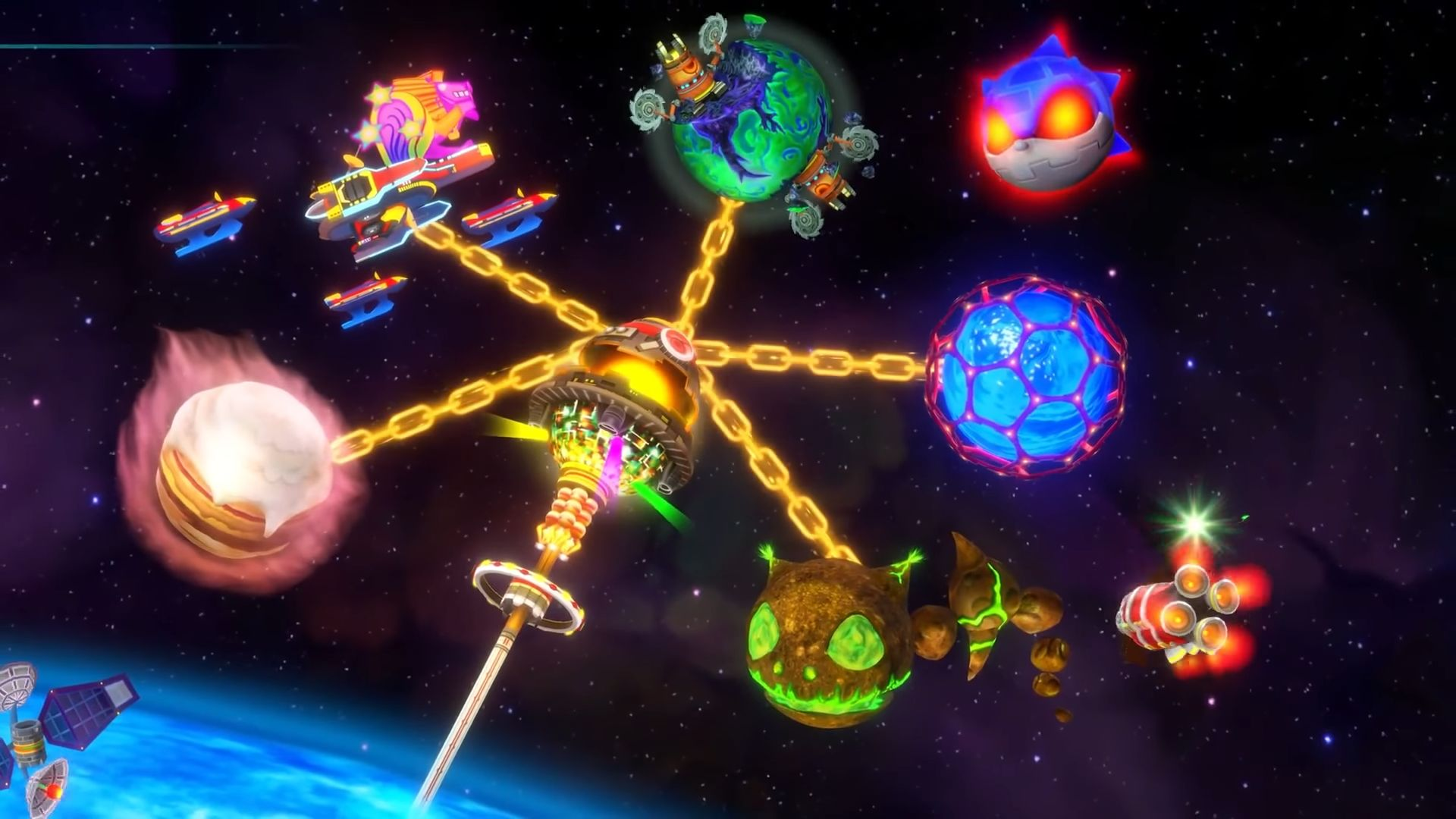
World hub of Sonic Colors, showing the planets of the amusement park

In both versions, Doctor Eggman opens an amusement park in space called "Dr. Eggman's Incredible Interstellar Amusement Park", allegedly turning over a new leaf and making up for past transgressions. The park is made up of several planet-sized attractions. Suspicious, Sonic the Hedgehog and his best friend Tails investigate. They meet Yacker, who comes from a species of aliens known as Wisps. After Tails invents a translator to communicate with him, they learn that other Wisps have been enslaved by Eggman, who plans to harness their energy for a mind-control laser that will allow him to take over Earth.

Sonic proceeds to visit the planets, liberating the Wisps and shutting down the generators linked to the amusement park. He meets many of his friends along the way, who are also exploring the park in an attempt to disrupt Eggman's plans. (Note: Only in the Nintendo DS version) After Sonic frees the Wisps, Eggman tries to fire the cannon at the world, but a piece of wreckage from an earlier boss fight causes it to malfunction. As the amusement park begins to explode, Sonic confronts Eggman. Eggman uses the Nega-Wisps to power his final contraption, a robot that uses the powers of all the Wisps that Sonic has met against him. As the machine gets weaker, the Wisps escape and help Sonic defeat Eggman, sending him hurtling off into space. The Wisps carry Sonic out of the exploding amusement park. Returning safely to Earth, Yacker thanks Sonic and Tails.

In the DS version, however, Sonic and Tails soon learn that the leading Mother Wisp had been infected by the negative energy and transformed into the Nega-Mother Wisp. Using the power of the Chaos Emeralds, Sonic transforms into Super Sonic and fights her. Following her defeat, the Mother Wisp returns to normal and the Wisps part ways with the two heroes.

In a post-credits scene, Eggman is seen stranded in space with his henchmen Orbot and Cubot.

== Development ==
From a general game design perspective, in recent years we've been able to introduce Sonic to new fans, a lot of the Nintendo/Mario fans, and because of that, we've made changes to the design, and we've designed things in Sonic Colors that we think will really appeal to people who are unfamiliar with the Sonic brand and the Sonic gameplay.

— Takashi Iizuka, on why Sonic Colors was designed to appeal to a wider demographic.

Development of Sonic Colors began following the completion of Sonic Unleashed in 2008, alongside Sonic Generations. While they kept most of Unleashed's core gameplay elements, developers Sonic Team and Dimps decided to create an equal balance between speed and platforming similar to that of the games released for the Sega Genesis, in comparison to the straightforward gameplay of Unleashed. Following requests by fans, the team also made the decision to make Sonic the only playable character, and to omit "gimmick" themes such as the swordplay mechanic used in the 2009 spin-off Sonic and the Black Knight. The team chose to develop Sonic Colors on Nintendo's Wii and DS consoles, hoping to expand upon the audience attracted by the successful Mario & Sonic at the Olympic Games crossover games.

Sonic Colors concept art picturing Sonic (on the left) and Yacker (on the right)

One of the first ideas was the setting should be an amusement park; Sonic Team then realized that "any sort of terrestrial amusement park would be too small to contain Sonic's adventures." From this came the idea of an interplanetary park, which would allow for more creativity and variance in the game. The developers used Disneyland as visual inspiration for the levels. Sonic Team also desired something that would diversify the gameplay, but did not slow it down. Thus, the Wisps were added to the game to expand and strengthen the gameplay without forcing the player to switch to other playable characters. Another goal was to encourage players to revisit completed levels; Sonic Team accomplished this by adding segments requiring certain types of Wisps to levels preceding their first appearances. The Wii version makes use of the PhysX physics engine, previously used with 2007's Sonic and the Secret Rings, while the DS version uses the same engine used in the 2005 entry Sonic Rush and its sequel.

According to producer Takashi Iizuka, Sonic Colors was designed to appeal to a casual audience, particularly children and fans of the Super Mario series. Iizuka's statement that it was impossible to please all Sonic fans initially alienated those who had enjoyed prior entries such as Unleashed and Sonic the Hedgehog 4: Episode I, though Sega brand manager Judy Gilbertson later clarified that "we're also looking to create a game that is accessible to younger gamers as well as our 'core' fans." The script was written by MadWorld and Happy Tree Friends contributors Ken Pontac and Warren Graff. Sonic Colors is also one of the first games in the series not to use the English voice cast from the Sonic X anime series following a major re-casting of the franchise in 2010, with Roger Craig Smith assuming the role of Sonic. Of the Sonic X cast, only Mike Pollock reprises his role as Dr. Eggman.

Sega first announced Sonic Colors in a blog post on May 26, 2010. Demo versions of the game were playable at the Electronic Entertainment Expo 2010, Gamescom, the Penny Arcade Expo, and the Tokyo Game Show. On November 4, 2010, Sega held a Sonic Colors-themed ice-skating event at Bryant Park in New York City. BradyGames also published an official strategy guide, which launched alongside the game. In anticipation of the game's release, Sega delisted multiple Sonic games with sub-average Metacritic scores to increase the value of the brand. Sonic Colors was first released in Australia on November 11, 2010, followed by a European release the following day, a North American release on November 16, 2010, and in Japan on November 18, 2010. People who pre-ordered the Japanese version of the game received a special card compatible with the arcade game Rekishi Taisen Gettenka, allowing Sonic to appear in the game. Those who pre-ordered the game through GameStop in North America received a Sonic shaped hat. A special edition was also sold in Europe, featuring figurines of Sonic and the Wisps.

=== Music ===
The game's score was composed by Tomoya Ohtani, Kenichi Tokoi, Fumie Kumatani, Hideaki Kobayashi, Mariko Nanba, and Naofumi Hataya, and was written to be more energetic than previous entries' scores. The in-game music is performed by the Amsterdam Session Orchestra. Jean Paul Makhlouf from the American electronic band Cash Cash performed the game's opening song, "Reach for the Stars" (remixed as "Reach for the Stars (Re-Colors)"), and his brother Alex joined him in singing the ending song, "Speak With Your Heart" (remixed as "Speak With Your Heart (Rainbow Mix)"). A three-CD soundtrack, Sonic Colors Original Soundtrack: Vivid Sounds × Hybrid Colors, featuring music from the game was released on CD in Japan on December 22, 2010, with a digital version released via iTunes in January 2011.

== Reception ==
Reception

Aggregate score
Aggregator	Score
Metacritic	DS: 79/100; WII: 78/100

Review scores
Publication	Score
1Up.com	WII: B+
Destructoid	WII: 4.5/10
Eurogamer	WII: 8/10
Game Informer	DS: 8.5/10; WII: 7/10
GameSpot	DS: 8/10; WII: 8/10
GamesRadar+	WII: 3.5/5
IGN	DS: 8.5/10; WII: 8.5/10
Nintendo Life	9/10
Nintendo Power	WII: 9/10; DS: 7.5/10
Nintendo World Report	8/10
Empire	4/5
Wired	7/10

Both versions of Sonic Colors received "generally favorable" reviews, according to review aggregator website Metacritic. The game was also successful commercially; as of March 2011, it has sold 2.18 million copies. In a Famitsu interview dated June 2021, Sonic Team director Takashi lizuka mentioned in response to a question that the game had sold 4 million copies across the Nintendo Wii and the Nintendo DS.

The game's presentation was well received. Pedro Hernandez of Nintendo World Report described the graphics and animations as "beautiful" and "gorgeous". Arthur Gies of IGN considered them to be among the best available on the Wii, praising the lighting, detail, and variety they offered. Both Hernandez and Jane Douglas of GameSpot both praised the audio for incorporating familiar aspects of past Sonic games, and Douglas admired the "jazzy, high-energy" soundtrack as fitting for all levels. The new voice casting was also appreciated; Gies elaborated that the cast was "much less annoying" than the previous voice actors, and Hernandez considered their voices to be fitting for the characters.

The gameplay was praised, particularly for the Wisps and its replay value. Al Bickham of Eurogamer considered the game's intertwining of platforming and speed to be successful, and also praised its use of the Wii Remote. Gies, Douglas, and John Meyer of Wired praised the shift from third-person to side-scrolling, which Meyer described as "elegant and cohesive". Matthew Keast of GamesRadar called the Wisps the game's best feature, describing the element of backtracking to previously completed levels after unlocking more types as clever. Tim Turi of Game Informer praised the Wisps for adding "an interesting new gameplay mechanic without succumbing to Werehog-itis", and Gies compared the Wisps to power-ups from the Super Mario franchise, though he felt that Colors still felt distinctive and fresh. Douglas, however, preferred basic platforming over using the Wisps.

Some aspects of the game were criticized, however. Writing for Destructoid, James Stephanie Sterling described Sonic Colors as "terribly designed". They criticized the controls and physics, and felt the developers had not addressed problems present in previous games and concluded that the game was poor. Gies, Hernandez, Meyer, Turi, and Keast criticized the game's high difficulty level, with Keast going as far to describe it as "hardcore". Both Gies and Douglas spoke negatively of the co-op Eggman's Sonic Simulator; Gies described it as not fun, and Douglas called it "ugly" and ultimately concluded that the multiplayer was weak. Douglas also made note of the boss fights as being repetitive.

Regarding the game as a whole, critics felt that Sonic Colors was one of the best entries in the Sonic series. IGN declared it one of the best games available for the Wii, and awarded it their "Quick Fix" award of 2010. Douglas concluded that "Wii owners shouldn't miss an opportunity to play with Sonic at his best". Empire considered Colors a return to form for the series, whose popularity had declined in recent years following a number of poorly received games such as the 2006 reboot.

== Legacy ==
Sonic Colors introduced the Wisp power-ups, which would go on to become a staple of the Sonic franchise. Games featuring the Wisps include Sonic Generations (2011), Sonic Lost World (2013), and Sonic Forces (2017). The story of Sonic Colors was adapted in Archie Comics' Sonic the Hedgehog comic book series.

Sonic Generations was released in commemoration of the series' twentieth anniversary, and remade various aspects from past entries. The version of the game released for the Xbox 360, PlayStation 3, and Microsoft Windows features a reimagined version of Sonic Colors's Planet Wisp level. The version of the game released for the Nintendo 3DS contains a remake of the Tropical Resort level.

== Sonic Colors: Ultimate ==
Promotional video for Sonic Colors: Ultimate

In May 2021, a remastered version, Sonic Colors: Ultimate, was announced for release on Nintendo Switch, PlayStation 4, Windows (via the Epic Games Store), and Xbox One. Developed by Blind Squirrel Games (Note: Nintendo Switch and Xbox One versions co-developed by Ridiculous Games) as part of the Sonic series' 30th anniversary, it was released worldwide on September 7, 2021, and in Japan and East Asia on September 9 of that year. Additionally, the game was released for Amazon Luna on April 21, 2022, and for Steam on February 6, 2023.

Based on the Wii version, the remaster's aesthetic changes include overhauled visuals and a newly recorded soundtrack. Gameplay changes include a re-imagined lives mechanic and a "Jade Ghost" Wisp power-up based on the one from Team Sonic Racing. Additional updates include a Rival Rush mode featuring Metal Sonic and unlockable cosmetic options, such as some based on the 2020 film. In addition to new voice lines from Kate Higgins, who reprises her role as the voice of Tails from the original game in English (Ryō Hirohashi in Japanese); additional voiceovers were included in French, German, Italian and Spanish. To coincide with the release of the game, a two-episode animated miniseries, Sonic Colors: Rise of the Wisps, was released in August 2021.

=== Reception ===
Reception

Aggregate scores
Aggregator	Score
Metacritic	PS4: 74/100; NS: 68/100; XONE: 74/100
OpenCritic	49% recommend

Review scores
Publication	Score
Destructoid	8.5/10
Hardcore Gamer	3.5/5
HobbyConsolas	PS4: 89/100; NS: 86/100
IGN	8/10
MeriStation	7.5/10
Nintendo Life	8/10
Nintendo World Report	5/10
Push Square	6/10
Shacknews	8/10
The Games Machine (Italy)	7.8/10

Sonic Colors: Ultimate received "mixed or average" reviews according to review aggregator Metacritic.

Shortly after its early access on September 3, several Twitter users started reporting several bugs and glitches not present in the original. The Switch version in particular was derided due to having far more technical issues than the other releases, such as an inferior frame-rate compared to the other versions, significantly longer load times and flashing lights that could induce a potential photosensitive epileptic seizure. Criticism was also directed towards the sound effects being incorrectly panned when playing with stereo sound, as well as the in-game cutscenes that were upscaled from 480p to 4K using artificial intelligence, resulting in noticeable artifacting. In addition, people data mining through the PC version found that it had used Godot Engine without proper credit.

Through December of 2021, numerous patches were released to address these issues. The final and most substantial update also added the option to toggle various changes from the original game. Most notably, players can toggle between the original and remixed soundtracks.
