= Shadow the Hedgehog (video game) =

2005 video game

- North American PlayStation 2 cover art
- Developer: Sega Studios USA
- Publisher: Sega
- Director: Takashi Iizuka
- Producer: Yuji Naka
- Designer: Takashi Iizuka
- Programmer: Takeshi Sakakibara
- Artist: Kazuyuki Hoshino
- Writer: Takashi Iizuka
- Composers: Jun Senoue; Yutaka Minobe; Tomoya Ohtani; Mariko Nanba
- Series: Sonic the Hedgehog
- Engine: RenderWare
- Platforms: GameCube; PlayStation 2; Xbox
- Release: NA: November 15, 2005; EU: November 18, 2005; JP: December 15, 2005
- Genres: Platform, third-person shooter
- Modes: Single-player, multiplayer

Shadow the Hedgehog (Note: Japanese: シャドウ・ザ・ヘッジホッグ, Hepburn: Shadō za Hejjihoggu) is a 2005 platform game developed by Sega Studios USA and published by Sega. It is a spinoff from the Sonic the Hedgehog series starring the character Shadow. It follows the amnesiac Shadow's attempts to learn about his past during an alien invasion. Gameplay is similar to previous Sonic games, featuring fast-paced platforming and ring collecting, but introduces third-person shooter and nonlinear elements. Shadow uses a variety of weapons to defeat enemies and complete missions that determine the plot and playable levels.

Sega Studios USA chose to make a game featuring Shadow to capitalize on his popularity and resolve plot mysteries that began with his introduction in Sonic Adventure 2 (2001). Shadow the Hedgehog was written and directed by Takashi Iizuka and produced by Yuji Naka, with music by Jun Senoue. Iizuka strove to attract an older audience; Shadow's character allowed the team to use a darker tone and elements otherwise considered inappropriate for the series.

Shadow the Hedgehog was revealed at the March 2005 Walk of Game event. It was released for the GameCube, PlayStation 2, and Xbox in North America and Europe in November 2005 and in Japan in December. It received generally unfavorable reviews from critics, who criticized its controls, mature themes, level design, and addition of guns and other weapons to traditional Sonic gameplay. However, some praised its replay value, and the game was commercially successful, selling 2.06 million copies by March 2007. Over time, the game has developed a cult following.

== Gameplay ==
Shadow the Hedgehog is a platformer that incorporates elements from the third-person shooter genre and elements from the action-adventure genre. Like previous games in the Sonic series, basic gameplay involves running quickly, collecting rings, tricky platforming and destroying enemies. Shadow collects rings as a form of health; when he is attacked by an enemy or takes damage from the environment, ten of his rings bounce away from and form into a circle around him. When Shadow has no rings and takes damage from an enemy he dies, loses a life and goes back to the last checkpoint, which also serve as teleportation devices, allowing Shadow to return to different sections of the current level. Each level is completed by undertaking a mission, and each mission is labelled "Hero", "Dark", or "Normal". The "Hero" missions involve completing tasks for the Sonic series' heroic characters, or Doctor Eggman on one occasion, and the "Dark" missions involve completing tasks for either Black Doom or Doctor Eggman. The "Normal" missions involve reaching the Chaos Emerald or Goal Ring at the end of the stage. Examples of non-neutral mission objectives include killing all enemies in the stages, destroying an aircraft flying to the end of the level, or activating or destroying objects in the stage. All enemies attack Shadow regardless of the mission chosen. The mission types selected affect the plot, the levels played, and the ending received out of ten possibilities. Each level features cutscenes that advance the story, and seven levels also feature boss battles. There are 326 possible paths to take in Shadow the Hedgehog, and each pathway is individually named.

Shadow uses a submachine gun to shoot a G.U.N. soldier. The game's mature themes and its addition of guns were two major areas of criticism.

New gameplay features distinguish Shadow the Hedgehog from previous Sonic games. For example, Shadow can pick up and use guns to fight enemies. Parts of the scenery, like traffic signs, can also be used as weapons. Another new feature is the ability to drive vehicles, such as motorcycles and an alien aircraft. Although Shadow can outrun the game's vehicles, the latter have unique capabilities, such as crushing enemies and traversing otherwise impassable acid-covered areas.

As in most Sonic series games, the Chaos Emeralds play a major role; they help Shadow remember his past and allow him to perform Chaos Control and Chaos Blast. Chaos Control allows Shadow to move more quickly in levels and slows time in boss battles, and Chaos Blast creates an explosion that destroys or severely damages all nearby enemies. Shadow can perform Chaos Control after the player fills the Hero Gauge by defeating Black Arms soldiers (or by doing other heroic acts such as putting out fires and healing wounded soldiers), and he can perform Chaos Blast after filling the Dark Gauge by defeating GUN soldiers (or other evil acts such as healing the enemies or destroying scenery).

The game includes a multiplayer mode that retains the single-player mechanics but is set in one of three specially designed stages and uses a vertically split screen to separate each player's view. Each player chooses one of the available characters—Shadow, two metallic versions of him, and palette-swapped variants of each. The combatants attack each other and steal each other's rings until one is eliminated. Additionally, in single-player mode, a second player may take control of Shadow's hero sidekick characters in the stages, though Dooms Eye, Dr. Eggman, and Charmy remain uncontrollable. This feature is omitted entirely in the Xbox version.

== Synopsis ==
=== Characters ===
Shadow the Hedgehog, the protagonist, was created fifty years before the game's events by Professor Gerald Robotnik in an orbital military research space colony known as the ARK. Robotnik was trying to unlock the secrets of eternal life on the government's orders and create the "Ultimate Life Form." To that end, Robotnik designed Shadow to harness the powers of the Chaos Emeralds. To his horror, Shadow witnessed GUN raid the ARK and shoot his best friend and granddaughter of Gerald, Maria Robotnik, killing her. Shadow was presumed dead at the end of Sonic Adventure 2 (2001), his first in-game appearance, but he returned to life in Sonic Heroes (2003) and suffers amnesia.

The Guardian Units of Nations (GUN) is the military of Earth's government, the United Federation, and is directed by the GUN Commander, (Note: Identified as "Commander Abraham Tower" in later series entries) who harbors a personal hatred of Shadow. When completing "Hero" missions, Shadow usually helps GUN and heroic characters from the Sonic series, including Sonic, Tails, Knuckles, Amy Rose, Rouge, E-123 Omega, Vector, Charmy, and Espio. Their aim is to protect Earth from both Doctor Eggman and the Black Arms, an army of various related alien species that invade Earth from the Black Comet. Black Doom, the leader of the Black Arms, sends an extension of himself called "Doom's Eye" to watch Shadow and help him complete missions. When completing "Dark" missions, Shadow helps either Black Doom or Doctor Eggman, each of whom wants the Chaos Emeralds for himself. In one "Hero" mission of Sky Troops, Shadow assists Doctor Eggman in battling the Black Arms.

=== Plot ===
Completing "Neutral", "Dark" or "Hero" missions determine which levels are subsequently playable. Each box shown represents a level, and each small box represents a boss. The player's choices in each level affect the game's storyline. There are 326 possible paths.

Shadow still suffers from amnesia, (Note: As depicted in Sonic Heroes (2003)) only able to remember two things: his name and his attempt to escape the Space Colony ARK with his creator Gerald Robotnik's granddaughter Maria, who was killed by GUN soldiers. (Note: As depicted in Sonic Adventure 2 (2001)) While Shadow is trying to remember what happened in his past outside the city of Westopolis, an alien race called the Black Arms drops out of the sky and invades the city. Black Doom, the Black Arms' leader, contacts Shadow and tells him of an old promise made to bring the Chaos Emeralds to him. Stunned that Black Doom knows his name, Shadow searches for the Chaos Emeralds to learn about his past.

The game progresses through the Westopolis level and five more levels from the different paths Shadow may take. As missions are completed, Shadow learns more about his past and regains memories. He can choose to help Doctor Eggman, the Black Arms, or GUN and the series' heroic characters, or he can choose to help neither and keep the Chaos Emeralds for himself. The missions completed determine which one of ten possible endings will be seen after Shadow collects all the Chaos Emeralds and defeats one of the game's final bosses. The possible ending events range from helping the heroes destroy the Black Arms to planning to destroy the planet.

Completing all ten endings unlocks the game's true ending. After collecting all the Chaos Emeralds, Black Doom uses Chaos Control to bring the Black Comet to the Earth's surface. Black Doom explains that the Black Arms intend to use humans as an energy source, and the Black Comet begins to release a nerve gas into the Earth's atmosphere that causes total paralysis to those who inhale it. Black Doom sends a swarm of Black Arms larvae to eat Sonic, his friends and Dr. Eggman once they become paralyzed by the gas. Immune to the paralysis, Shadow confronts Black Doom, who reveals Gerald had promised him the Chaos Emeralds to complete his plan in exchange for his blood, which Gerald used to create Shadow. He attempts to use this physical connection to mind control Shadow. The Chaotix discover and play a message Gerald recorded for Shadow, revealing he created the ARK's Eclipse Cannon to destroy the Black Comet as atonement for working with Black Doom, asking Shadow to stop the Black Arms. Shadow surpass Black Doom's mind control, and Black Doom transforms into a giant beast form called Devil Doom; in response, Shadow uses the Chaos Emeralds to transform into Super Shadow and confronts Devil Doom. During the battle, Doctor Eggman confirms to Shadow that he is the original and not an android. Shadow kills Devil Doom and uses Chaos Control to teleport the Black Comet back into Earth's orbit, where he obliterates it using the Eclipse Cannon. His friends are elated, as are people at GUN headquarters. Shadow is then seen in the ARK's observation deck holding up a photograph of Maria and Gerald. Recalling Maria's last words to him, "Goodbye forever... Shadow the Hedgehog", Shadow discards the photograph and walks away.

== Development ==
"Shadow the Hedgehog has a much darker personality than Sonic the Hedgehog. In Sonic the Hedgehog, your typical mission was to go out and beat the bad guys, but in Shadow the Hedgehog, it gives the players a choice to either take the side of the good guys or to take the side of the bad guys, giving the player the option to choose in the game."

— Sonic Team's Takashi Iizuka

After the success of the character's debut in Sonic Adventure 2 (2001) and following the release of the 2003 game Sonic Heroes, Sega Studios USA began developing a spin-off Sonic game starring the most liked character, Shadow; the game was titled Shadow the Hedgehog. The now-defunct United States division of Sega's Sonic Team published the game. Sega first revealed the game and its tagline ("Hero or villain? You decide.") at the March 8, 2005, inauguration of Sonic the Hedgehog into the Walk of Game. Sega formally announced development of the game for the GameCube, PlayStation 2 and Xbox video game consoles on March 23, 2005. The same year, Sega released the game in North America on November 15, 2005, in Europe on November 18, 2005, and Japan on December 15, 2005.

Sonic Team's Takashi Iizuka and series co-creator Yuji Naka led development, with Iizuka serving as writer and director and Naka as producer. Iizuka, who had worked on the Sonic the Hedgehog series since 1993, targeted a younger audience with previous Sonic games and wanted to attract an older audience with Shadow. The game's development team wanted to make a game featuring Shadow to resolve plot mysteries that began with the character's introduction in Adventure 2. The team felt that Shadow's design—inspired by films such as Underworld (2003), Constantine (2005) and the Terminator franchise—would make the story darker and allow for elements, such as vehicles and weapons, otherwise considered inappropriate for a Sonic game. Naka stated in an interview with GameSpy that he wanted to use Shadow as the game's main character due to his popularity among fans and being the best fit for a "gun action" game.

The game features several animated cutscenes produced by Blur Studio. The music of Shadow the Hedgehog was composed by Jun Senoue, with additional work by Yutaka Minobe, Tomoya Ohtani, and Mariko Nanba. Lost and Found: Shadow the Hedgehog Vocal Trax is a video game soundtrack album released on CD on February 22, 2006. The album contains seven vocal songs from the game by bands including Senoue's band Crush 40, A2, Julien-K, Magna-Fi, and Powerman 5000. Another soundtrack, Shadow the Hedgehog: Original Soundtrax, was released on the same day. It contains all instrumental tracks from the game, as well as the vocal song I Am... All of Me, albeit in a shortened form.

In Japan, Shadow the Hedgehog was promoted through a collaboration with Japanese hip-hop group M-Flo, whose song "Tripod Baby" was remixed and featured in the commercial under the title "Tripod Baby (Shadow the Hedgehog Mix)". In addition to this, an alternate music video for "Tripod Baby" featuring the remix included new scenes with Shadow.

Shadow the Hedgehog was the first Sonic game to use the 4Kids cast from Sonic X following the death of Doctor Eggman's previous voice actor, Deem Bristow. This cast continued to be used after Sonic X ended in 2005 until late 2010 when all but Mike Pollock were replaced before the release of Sonic Free Riders. In 2024, lead voice actor Jason Griffith recounted at MomoCon that at one point during the game's development, Sega had intended to attempt to receive an M-rating from the Entertainment Software Rating Board, and that there existed a hard drive containing hours of unused "recordings of Shadow yelling f*** at Tails and Sonic and stuff." He stated that although he did not understand why they had written such profane lines, he "just went with it" and enjoyed it.

== Reception ==
Reception

Aggregate score
Aggregator	Score
Metacritic	(GC) 51/100 (Xbox) 49/100 (PS2) 45/100

Review scores
Publication	Score
1Up.com	(PS2) D− (GC & Xbox) C+
AllGame	2/5
Eurogamer	5/10
Game Informer	4/10, 2/10
GameSpot	(GC & Xbox) 4.8/10 (PS2) 4.7/10
GameSpy	2/5
GameTrailers	8.3/10
IGN	(GC & Xbox) 4.9/10 (PS2) 4.7/10
Nintendo Power	8/10
Official Xbox Magazine (UK)	7/10
X-Play	1/5
Herald Sun	3.5/5
The Times	2/5

Shadow the Hedgehog on GameCube received "mixed or average" reviews while the PlayStation 2 and Xbox versions received "generally unfavorable" reviews from critics on review aggregator Metacritic, many of which were highly critical of its gameplay mechanics and differences from other Sonic games. However, it was voted the best game of 2005 in the Official Jetix Magazine Reader Awards and named the "Best Platformer" of 2005 by Nintendo Power readers (receiving more votes than the staff's choice, Sonic Rush). Shadow the Hedgehog was also a commercial success: Sega reported 1.59 million units sold from its release to March 2006 and 470,000 units sold in the U.S. from March 2006 to March 2007, for total sales of at least 2.06 million. The game was later released as a part of three budget lines: Greatest Hits and Platinum Range for the PlayStation 2 (representing sales of at least 400,000 in North America and Europe, respectively) and Player's Choice for the GameCube (250,000 in North America).

Many critics derided the game's sense of maturity for a Sonic game, especially the addition of guns and other weapons. Game Informer staff writer Matt Helgeson said, "not only is this new 'adult' interpretation of Sonic painfully dumb, it's also ill-advised and almost feels like a betrayal to longtime fans." Eurogamer staff writer Tom Bramwell felt that "the game's other selling point – its darker edge – [is] not really meant for us." G4's X-Play and GameSpy staff writer Patrick Klepek thought similarly. In contrast, Nintendo Power staff writer Steve Thomason rated the game 8.0 out of 10, stating, "this darker take on the Sonic universe succeeds for the most part, giving the series a bit of an edge without going overboard on violence." In addition, Official Xbox Magazine reassured readers, "Don't worry, Shadow the Hedgehog isn't half as 'urban' or quite as 'gangsta' as it first seems." Helgeson panned the game's "laughable" plot, saying it "makes no sense," and that various Sonic conventions undermined its attempts to be "mature" or "edgy".

Reviewers also noted the game's controls, especially Shadow's homing attack causing unexpected character deaths. Game Informer's Matt Helgeson complained that the attack "frequently sends you careening off into nothingness, resulting in cheap death after cheap death." Nintendo Power, X-Play, Eurogamer, Official Xbox Magazine, and GameSpy agreed. Other complaints focused on the mechanics of weapons and vehicles. Greg Mueller of GameSpot felt that the guns were nearly useless because of a lack of a target lock or manual aim, combined with an ineffective auto-aim. IGN staff writer Matt Casamassina, 1UP.com staff writer Greg Sewart, Game Informer, X-Play, GameSpy, and London's The Times also criticized the mechanics of Shadow's weapons, vehicles, and other aspects of the game's controls. However, Thomason said that "blasting Shadow's foes with the wide variety of weapons at his disposal is just plain fun."

The level design received mixed comments. Mueller called some levels "extremely frustrating". Helgeson stated that the fast-paced levels are "poorly designed", and Andrew Reiner, who wrote a second-opinion review for Game Informer, called the level design "disastrous". Official Xbox Magazine was more mixed, balancing the possibility of getting lost in the large levels with the likely appeal of these stages to 3D Sonic gamers, particularly those who had enjoyed Sonic Heroes. GameTrailers found that "the levels are either dark and urban, or bright and psychedelic. Either way, they fit in well to the Sonic universe. They are loaded with speed ramps, loops and an assortment of other boosts that rocket Shadow like a pinball." Bettenhausen included "the classic run-like-hell roller coaster design philosophy" of some stages in his limited praise. Casamassina disliked the "stupid level design", saying that "[j]ust because they dazzled players six years ago does not mean that Sonic Team can copy and paste exactly the same loops and spins into each new franchise iteration and expect everyone to be happy with the outcome." GameSpy observed that "the areas are much less open than in previous Sonic games, but the level designers haven't taken advantage of the constraints." Nintendo Power singled out the difficulty of the missions that require the player to locate objects.

Critics praised the game's replay value, applauding the many possible paths that a player may take through the game. GameTrailers stated, "this choose-your-own-adventure style gives the game replay value that many platformers lack." The Australian publication Herald Sun, Nintendo Power, and Official Xbox Magazine thought similarly. GameSpot praised the variety of alternate endings, but concluded that "the gameplay isn't fun enough to warrant playing the game through multiple times." Bettenhausen thought that the morality system felt artificial, but said that it extended the game's replay value.

== Legacy ==
Shadow the Hedgehog has developed a cult following since its release. However, Shadow did not appear as the main playable character in another game until 2024's Shadow Generations, in which Shadow the Hedgehog villain Black Doom returns for his second appearance in the video game series. In 2022, fans LimblessVector and dreamsyntax released Shadow the Hedgehog: Reloaded, a ROM hack for Shadow the Hedgehog aiming to address common criticisms of the game. A PC port of the game built through static recompilation was released on November 15, 2026, coinciding with the game's 21st anniversary.

In a retrospective review for Kotaku following the release of Shadow Generations, Kenneth Shepard described Shadow the Hedgehog as a "pretty solid" example of a 3D Sonic game, and said it "had some interesting ideas". Shepard praised the game's multiple branching narrative paths as "really compelling", calling its mission structure a "natural evolution" of the alternate story campaigns featured in other Sonic games of the time and saying it allowed players to "explore the deep (if overly convoluted) backstory of the antihero". However, Shepard also admitted that "some of [the] hate is deserved", criticizing the gunplay as "frustrating" and the vehicles as pointless, as it was generally faster to simply run as Shadow on foot. Nonetheless, he said the game was "a pretty fascinating reflection of a moment in both the Sonic franchise and pop culture at large". In another retrospective review, Eurogamer's Paul Cecchini called the game "fine" and similarly said it "had some cool ideas". Cecchini also commented on the lack of any ports of the game to modern platforms or other meaningful acknowledgement of or references to the game by Sega since its release, calling the release of Shadow Generations and its "unexpected" revival of Black Doom "significant" as a result.

Jeff Fowler, who helped create cutscenes for Shadow the Hedgehog, went on to direct the live-action Sonic the Hedgehog film series produced by Paramount Pictures. The third film introduces the character of Shadow to the franchise, and uses some elements of his 2005 game. Additionally, Fowler paid homage to some scenes from the game in the film's action sequences featuring Shadow. Fowler described the experience of adapting Shadow's character for the big screen as an honor, saying that he felt his career had come "full circle" from his involvement on Shadow.
