= Formula One World Championship: Beyond the Limit =

1994 video game

- Developer: Sega
- Publisher: Sega
- Director: Yasuo Namitome
- Producer: Jitsunosuke Kawai
- Composer: List of composers: Jun Senoue Masafumi Ogata Sachio Ogawa Yoshiaki Kashima Junko Shiratsu Yayoi Wachi Haruyo Oguro Yoshimasa Inoue Nittoku Inoue
- Platform: Sega CD
- Release: JP: April 23, 1994; NA: August 1994; EU: September 1994
- Genre: Racing
- Modes: Single-player, multiplayer

Formula One World Championship: Beyond the Limit, released in Japan as Heavenly Symphony: Formula One World Championship 1993 (ヘブンリーシンフォニー) is a racing game developed and published by Sega, with production assistance from Fuji Television, and released for the Sega CD in 1994. As the name implies, the game places the player in the seat of a Formula One car, complete with multiple teams and opponents and all the licensed tracks of the series.

Beyond the Limit makes heavy use of scaling and rotating background layers and sprites, as well as limited use of texture mapped polygon graphics, with scaling and rotation being two of the key features of the Sega CD console. The effect is similar in some respects to Sega arcade games such as Super Monaco GP and Out Run, but far more advanced with the rotation, warping, and textured simple polygon models.

== Gameplay ==
The player starts on a test track with a generic car, aiming for a top time in order to receive contract offers from Formula One teams. After accepting an offer, all the races of the season have to be completed, and depending on the player's performance, either bigger and better teams will offer their cars to the player character or the player character gets fired.

Because Beyond the Limit was made after the 1993 season had already finished, the game includes all of the tracks used in the 1993 season, including a fictional 'Sega Park Circuit' course used for testing. Also included are all 35 drivers that drove at some point during the 1993 season, and as most of the driver changes occurred in the last third of the season, as the players play near the end of the season, many of the driver's changes can be noticed in the lower-class teams. Ayrton Senna is not included in the game, as his license was held by his own game produced on the Sega Genesis/Mega Drive.

=== Changes for the Western release ===
In addition to the name, several changes were made for the North American and European releases. In the Japanese version, the control is slower as well as the acceleration speed, and the risk of engine failure is much higher. It is possible to have mechanical problems upon hitting an obstacle at high speed, which cannot happen in the North American and European versions. The turbo can only be used for about one full lap before an engine failure, while it was possible to use it for about four laps in the Western versions. Also, it is possible in the Japanese version to spin off the track under wet conditions even when not hitting any obstacles. Also, during gameplay, the map and time are displayed at the top of the screen in the Japanese version. In the Western versions, these are displayed at the bottom.

== Reception ==
Reception

Review scores
Publication	Score
Famitsu	26/40
GamePro	13.5/20

GamePro commented that the game has well-done real world elements, such as cars responding differently depending on what surface they're being driven on, but is sub-par when it comes to conventional racing elements. They noted specific problems such as touchy controls, the lack of a multiplayer mode, "the standard Sega CD pixelization", and confusing graphical elements such as overly small rear-view mirrors and a cockpit view that lies too close to the ground.
