= NASCAR Arcade =

2000 video game

- European arcade flyer, featuring Jeff Gordon and Dale Jarrett's cars in the front row
- Developer: Sega Rosso
- Publisher: Sega
- Director: Isao Matsumoto
- Producer: Kenji Arai
- Designer: Daisuke Ogawa
- Programmer: Kazuhiro Mori
- Composer: Jun Senoue
- Platform: Arcade
- Release: JP: September 2000; NA: March 2001; EU: 2001
- Genre: Racing
- Modes: Single-player, multiplayer
- Arcade system: Sega Hikaru

NASCAR Arcade, (Note: Japanese: NASCAR(ナスカー)アーケード, Hepburn: Nasukā ākēdo) initially known as NASCAR Rubbin' Racing outside North America, is a 2000 racing video game developed by Sega Rosso and published by Sega for arcades. It was produced at the suggestion of producer Kenji Arai, and the soundtrack was produced by Jun Senoue. The game is based on the 1999 NASCAR Winston Cup Series, and carries an official NASCAR license with permission from EA Sports, who permitted Sega to develop the game as a arcade-only title.

The game was released in both standard and deluxe arcade cabinets, and up to eight cabinets can be linked for multiplayer. Players have to race against competition at one of four tracks while also racing against a timer. Previews and reviews of the game praised the realistic graphics and smoothness, but had criticisms of the game's gear shifter and comparison to other Sega games.

== Gameplay ==
The player, playing as Dale Jarrett, is battling Ernie Irvan for 23rd place at Richmond International Raceway; utilizing the optional third-person perspective.

NASCAR Arcade is a racing game based on the 1999 NASCAR Winston Cup Series. Four tracks are available to select from: Talladega Superspeedway, Richmond International Raceway, and Watkins Glen International, as well as a "Team SEGA" secret track. Each track represents a different level of difficulty. The goal of the game is to advance through the field of rival race cars, while racing against a timer. Reaching a goal before the timer reaches zero resets the timer and extends the play. There are Race and Time Attack modes in single-player, as well as a multiplayer mode where up to eight arcade cabinets can be linked. The game's arcade cabinet seat will move when hitting an opponent or being hit, and the game's deluxe cabinet includes a tubular roll cage. Secret codes via gear shifter and by highlighting a particular car and holding down the brake pedal would allow access to drivers such as Richard Petty, Adam Petty (who died prior to the game's release), and Dale Earnhardt Jr.

== Development ==
NASCAR Arcade was developed by Sega Rosso, formerly Sega's R&D #12 division. Production of a NASCAR-based game was suggested by the game's producer, Kenji Arai, despite concerns that NASCAR was not well known in Japan (although NASCAR had previously hosted exhibition races at Suzuka Circuit and Twin Ring Motegi). At the time of its development, the license to create console games based on NASCAR belonged to Electronic Arts (EA), who were not releasing games on Sega's home console system, the Dreamcast. EA granted permission to Sega to develop NASCAR Arcade as a coin-op only game. The game runs on the Sega Hikaru arcade system board. According to Anoop Gantayat of IGN, he felt the game's original name of NASCAR Rubbin' Racing would sound odd to native English speakers and needed to change when the game came to North America. Official Dreamcast Magazine called the game's original title "very, very strange". The game was released as NASCAR Arcade in Japan.

NASCAR Arcade's soundtrack was created by Jun Senoue and recorded by Sons of Angels (later known as Crush 40), with Senoue on guitar and Johnny Gioeli singing the vocals. Senoue had previously worked on a racing game soundtrack before with Eric Martin of Mr. Big on the title track for Daytona USA: Championship Circuit Edition, also called "Sons of Angels". Senoue and Gioeli later released the soundtrack as the album Thrill of the Feel on March 23, 2000 in Japan under the Sons of Angels name. It was released by Victor Entertainment.

== Release and reception ==
In a preview of the game from testing in Shinjuku, Chris Johnston of GameSpot called NASCAR Arcade "one to watch out for". He noted the smooth textures of the graphics and the game's ability to run at 60 frames per second without any slowdown. According to a 2000 GameFAQs FAQ by Mark Kim, the Brunswick Zone in Naperville, Illinois was the first arcade in the United States to feature the game. The game was also demonstrated at the JAMMA 2000 show in Tokyo, with Anoop Gantayat of IGN stating the graphics and shadow effects appeared very realistic and that the steering wheel controls felt very realistic with the addition of resistance, along with good quality sound including deep, roaring engine sounds.

In Japan, Game Machine listed NASCAR Arcade as the 18th most successful dedicated arcade game of November 2000. Edge stated that unlike Daytona USA, NASCAR Arcade shows a focus on realism. The reviewer called the game "technically accomplished, with cars and background well rendered", but criticized the gear shifter and negatively compared the game's graphics to Sega Rally 2. In 2011, Tim Daniels of Bleacher Report rated the game 15th in a list of the top 25 NASCAR video games, praising the game's realism.

== See also ==
- Daytona USA 2001
