= Team Sonic Racing =

2019 video game

- Developer: Sumo Digital
- Publisher: Sega
- Director: Shunsuke Kawarazuka
- Producer: Takashi Iizuka
- Designers: Derek Littlewood; Richard Acherki
- Programmers: Chris Jackson; Tim Furnish
- Artists: Kelvin Tuite; Cris Lonergan-White
- Composers: Jun Senoue; Tee Lopes
- Series: Sonic the Hedgehog
- Platforms: Nintendo Switch; PlayStation 4; Windows; Xbox One
- Release: May 21, 2019
- Genre: Kart racing
- Modes: Single-player, multiplayer

Team Sonic Racing is a 2019 kart racing game developed by Sumo Digital and published by Sega. A spin-off of the Sonic the Hedgehog series, it was released for the Nintendo Switch, PlayStation 4, Windows, and Xbox One in May 2019. A simplified version for iOS developed by Hardlight, Sonic Racing, was released via Apple Arcade in September 2019. The game was later released on Amazon Luna in March 2021.

Controlling one of 15 characters from the series' cast, players compete in races using sports cars. Gameplay is from a third-person perspective, with players performing tricks, drifting, and collecting power-ups. Team Sonic Racing differs from traditional kart racers because of its focus on cooperative gameplay, similar to the kind featured in Splatoon (2015) and Overwatch (2016)—players are part of a team of racers and win races through efficiency rather than speed. Game modes include competing to earn points, time trials, customizing the racing rules, and a story-driven tutorial campaign.

Sumo Digital, which had previously worked on Sonic & Sega All-Stars Racing (2010) and Sonic & All-Stars Racing Transformed (2012), developed Team Sonic Racing. Sonic Team head Takashi Iizuka conceived the cooperative gameplay, and Sumo Digital used the team-based Sonic Heroes (2003) as a point of reference. Unlike Sumo Digital's previous racing games, Team Sonic Racing only features Sonic characters, as the team wanted to expand the series' world and character roster. They aimed to make the game stand out compared to other racing games and developed it using a modified version of the All-Stars game engine. Musician Jun Senoue, who had not contributed to a major Sonic game since Generations (2011), composed the soundtrack.

Team Sonic Racing's existence came to light when a Sumo Digital memo leaked in January 2018, with Sega confirming it the following May. Its marketing campaign included appearances at trade shows, a one-shot comic from IDW Publishing, and a two-part animated series. The game received mixed reviews from critics; while its team-based gameplay, track designs, and music were praised, both the story mode and voice acting were criticized. Many critics also considered it inferior to its predecessors, the Sega-All Stars games. A sequel, Sonic Racing: CrossWorlds, was released in 2025.

== Gameplay ==
An example of gameplay in Team Sonic Racing, depicting Metal Sonic in Planet Wisp, a Sonic Colors-themed stage

Team Sonic Racing is a Sonic the Hedgehog-themed kart racing game featuring single-player and multiplayer modes. After selecting one of 15 characters from the series' cast, players participate in races using sports cars on courses thematically based on locations from the franchise. There are three types of racing classes: speed, technique, and power. Each type has its own unique abilities; for example, technique racers like Tails can drive over rough surfaces like grass without slowing down. The player views gameplay from a third-person perspective and runs over panels to get speed boosts, performs tricks in midair, and drifts to make sharp turns. Power-ups called Wisps can be collected from canisters with "?" marks and grant players temporary offensive and defensive advantages.

The gameplay differs from traditional racing games because of its focus on cooperative gameplay: the player is part of a team of racers and they must work together. While each player in a team still takes control of a single racer, they must also pay attention to how teammates are performing and share power-ups. Instead of winning races by simply finishing first, teams get points based on how they worked together. Thus, the most efficient team wins. Four teams of three compete, for a total of twelve racers at a time. Any character can be in a team; the player also has the option for each teammate to be the same character. Working together causes an "Ultimate" meter to be filled. When full, it can be activated to gain a temporary burst of speed. The meter's duration can be extended by hitting competing racers.

There are 21 tracks in total, including some returning from Sonic & Sega All-Stars Racing (2010) and Sonic & All-Stars Racing Transformed (2012), each split across seven zones and based on locations from main Sonic games. Team Sonic Racing features a variety of game modes, including Grand Prix, in which players compete to earn points; Time Trial, in which players race for the fastest time possible; and Exhibition, in which players can customize the racing rules. One mode, "Team Adventure", is a story-driven campaign that also includes a tutorial, as well as an original story explaining why the characters are racing. It is divided into chapters and players must complete missions like collecting as many rings as possible. Unlike the main game, the teams in Team Adventure are predetermined. Progressing through Team Adventure will unlock extras that can be used in the other modes.

Players can customize their vehicles, with new parts unlocked as they progress through the game. Customization options can be purchased using in-game currency called Mod Pods, which are earned by competing in races. Parts modify cars' handling, boost, acceleration, defense, and top speed, and players can also make aesthetic changes such as paint jobs and horn sounds. The game supports four-player local multiplayer, up to twelve online, and up to three in Team Adventure.

=== Characters ===
Team Sonic Racing features a total of 15 characters, divided into five teams of three racers. While most modes allow players to select any combination of characters, the story mode restricts characters to the following teams:

- Team Sonic
  - Sonic
  - Tails
  - Knuckles
- Team Rose
  - Amy
  - Chao
  - Big
- Team Vector
  - Blaze
  - Silver
  - Vector
- Team Dark
  - Shadow
  - Rouge
  - Omega
- Team Eggman
  - Metal Sonic
  - Dr. Eggman
  - Zavok

== Plot ==
An alien tanuki named Dodon Pa sends invitations to Sonic the Hedgehog and several of his friends, inviting them to compete in a series of team-based races. He builds cars outfitted with advanced technology for each of the racers, offering them as a prize for the winning team. Though they are skeptical of Dodon Pa's motivations, Sonic and the others agree. The competition takes them across the world, with Dodon Pa pitting them against increasingly difficult challenges.

The racers remain suspicious of Dodon Pa, believing he may be working with Sonic's longtime nemesis Doctor Eggman. Investigating further, they discover he is king of the planet Donpa Kingdom and the president of the Donpa Motors automotive corporation. The company is constructing an Ultimate Energy Engine, which gains power from teamwork. Intending it for philanthropic use, Dodon Pa has been using the races to gather research data for the engine and generate energy to power it.

After unsuccessfully attempting to steal the engine, Eggman and his henchmen kidnap Dodon Pa and hold him hostage on their battleship. Eggman deceives Dodon Pa into finishing the engine for him, forcing Sonic and the others to continue racing to power it. Eggman installs the engine into a doomsday robot, but it goes haywire and destroys the battleship. Sonic and his friends manage to rescue Dodon Pa as the ship explodes, though the cars are destroyed in the process. A grateful Dodon Pa builds everyone new cars, and they prepare to race again.

== Development ==
The British video game developer Sumo Digital developed Team Sonic Racing for the Nintendo Switch, PlayStation 4, Windows, and Xbox One. It was Sumo Digital's third racing game featuring the Sonic intellectual property (IP), following Sonic & Sega All-Stars Racing and Sonic & All-Stars Racing Transformed. Sega chose Sumo Digital to develop the game because of its experience with the Sonic IP. Development began before the completion of Sonic Mania and Sonic Forces in 2017. Unlike those games, which featured action-oriented gameplay, Team Sonic Racing was aimed at casual gamers. The majority of the staff did not work on the previous games, although some who did were contacted for advice. The lead designer of the game was Richard Acherki, while Sonic Team head Takashi Iizuka served as producer. Team Sonic Racing was Acherki's first game at Sumo Digital. According to Acherki, the proprietary game engine Team Sonic Racing runs on is a modified version of the one used to develop the Sonic & Sega All-Stars Racing games, and allowed them to easily port the game across platforms.

Unlike the Sonic & Sega All-Stars games, which featured various Sega franchises, Team Sonic Racing solely focuses on Sonic. Sega's community manager Aaron Webber said that Team Sonic Racing is not a sequel to Sonic & All-Stars Racing Transformed and is "very, very different" from previous Sonic racers. Iizuka explained that the team wanted to make a game that took place solely in the Sonic universe, which is why it does not bear the All-Stars name. He noted Sega used to release a variety of racing games such as Out Run (1986) and Daytona USA (1992), and said Team Sonic Racing continues this tradition. Webber added that the team wanted to expand the world and character roster of Sonic, and designer Derek Littlewood said setting the game in the Sonic universe allowed them use to the series' "full suite" of characters and elements. One of Sumo Digital's goals was to "provide plenty of fan service and also [give] people something new to look at and experience." Designer Ben Wilson called working on a Sonic game "surreal" and said the team enjoyed working with Sega. The game does not support cross-platform multiplayer, which Iizuka stated is because of technical constraints.

Sumo Digital wanted to make Team Sonic Racing stand out compared to other racing games, and with the engine of previous games they had a solid foundation to build a new experience. Iizuka suggested that they design it so it was easy for beginners. Sumo Digital also wanted to build on the gameplay of Sonic & Sega All-Stars Racing Transformed, which many players enjoyed. Iizuka conceived the team-based gameplay after watching his son play a kart racing game with his friends. He observed that they were not all happy and pondered how they could all enjoy the game. Observing other games, Sumo Digital found that team gameplay was popular; noting that racing games were largely single-player experiences, they decided combining the concepts would create a unique and exciting experience. Iizuka said Sumo Digital was not inspired by other kart racing games like Mario Kart 8 (2014) because the team wanted to make a game that emphasized teamwork instead of "a network game", citing Splatoon (2015) and Overwatch (2016) as examples of the cooperative gameplay Team Sonic Racing was designed to resemble. He also found it surprising there were few team-based racing games available.

Designing the game was challenging because the teamwork aspect was an unusual concept for a racing game. Iizuka and the team found that, if the cooperative gameplay was too prominent, it would hamper with the fluidity of the gameplay. Sumo Digital used Sonic Heroes (2003), which features team-based gameplay, as a point of reference. Other difficulties arose from choosing characters for the roster. For instance, Vector the Crocodile, traditionally seen as a member of the Chaotix in Sonic games, is paired with Blaze the Cat and Silver the Hedgehog in Team Sonic Racing, which led to considerable debate among the team. They also had a hard time choosing courses with a variety of atmospheres. Each character received a unique car designed to reflect their individuality, while custom parts were made separately. Team Sonic Racing features several new versions of the Wisp power-ups from previous Sonic games. The Sega All-Stars games included general power-ups since they featured multiple franchises, but since Team Sonic Racing features simply Sonic, Sumo Digital unified the power-ups with Wisps. The team worked with the Japanese Sonic Team staff to get approval for their concepts.

Jun Senoue composed the soundtrack in his first major work in the Sonic series since Sonic Generations (2011), while Richard Jacques, Tee Lopes, Tyler Smyth of DangerKids, Tomoya Ohtani, chip-tune artist TORIENA and the EDM group Hyper Potions also contributed. The game's theme song, "Green Light Ride", was performed by Senoue's band Crush 40. Iizuka said the team needed "cool" music that would "influence the player's excitement", which led him to ask Senoue to compose the score. He composed each track individually, collaborating with a different musician for each one.

== Promotion and release ==
Rumors of a new Sonic racing game arose in January 2018, when an internal Sumo Digital memo mentioning an "unannounced karting game" based on an "established global IP" leaked. Sumo Digital's history with Sonic caused speculation that it was developing a new Sega All-Stars title, which Webber denied. Despite his response, several toy companies alluded to a future Sonic kart racing game in February 2018. For example, a representative for the company Zappies reported at the Spielwarenmesse toy fair in Nuremberg that a third Sonic kart racing game was in development and that it planned to produce promotional toy figures. Sonic fans noted Webber's comments just alluded to the Sega All-Stars name and did not discount the premise of a new Sonic racing game, and further rumors of a game without any other Sega IPs involved arose later in February. Sega scheduled a Sonic-related announcement for its March 16, 2018 show at the SXSW convention. While Sega did not reveal the racing game there, the official series Twitter account teased it.

In May 2018, after the game leaked in a Walmart retail listing, Sega confirmed Team Sonic Racing was in development. Eurogamer expressed disappointment that it did not include any non-Sonic characters as playable racers, which its writer believed was one of the best things about Sonic & Sega All Stars Racing and its sequel. However, he remained optimistic, believing Sumo Digital's experience with Sonic would ensure the game would be a similar, "fundamentally brilliant arcade racer". Sega initially slated Team Sonic Racing for release in late 2018, but delayed it to May 21, 2019, that October to give Sumo Digital more development time. Iizuka later clarified that there were problems with the online mode that took more time than anticipated to fix. The game was released for Amazon Luna on March 11, 2021.

A demo version was playable at E3 2018 in June. The demo, which featured one track and six playable characters, was described by Kotaku as underwhelming, unfavorably comparing it to Mario Kart. Kotaku argued the demo lacked ambition and called its character lineup shallow, especially when compared to that of Sonic & All-Stars Racing Transformed. A more optimistic opinion came from IGN: although he considered the power-ups generic, the writer felt the game still had a good foundation and that the team gameplay was satisfying. Hardcore Gamer nominated it as E3's best racing game, but it lost to Forza Horizon 4. Sega released a trailer to promote the game at E3, featuring the theme song and an in-depth look at the gameplay. Another demo was playable at Gamescom in August 2018. More details were revealed, including the new character Dodon Pa, aspects of the story, and racetracks based on levels in Sonic the Hedgehog 3 (1994) and Sonic Unleashed (2008). The game won the "Best Casual Game" award at the 2018 Gamescom Awards. Team Sonic Racing was also present at PAX West in August, where attendees were given an exclusive poster, and the Tokyo Game Show in November.

IDW Publishing released a promotional one-shot comic book, written by Teenage Mutant Ninja Turtles scribe Caleb Goellner and illustrated by Sonic comic artist Adam Bryce Thomas, in December 2018. The story is set before the game's events and features Sonic, Tails, Knuckles, and their friends traveling to a mysterious planet and preventing "an old foe" from obtaining new technology. At SXSW in March 2019, the first episode of a two-part tie-in animated series, Team Sonic Racing Overdrive, was released, followed by the second episode in April. The series' animation was handled by Tyson Hesse and Neko Production, who previously produced the Sonic Mania (2017) tie-in Sonic Mania Adventures. On launch day, Sega released a live-action trailer set in a supermarket, featuring a cameo from Iizuka. Sumo Digital chose to offer all content at launch instead of selling some as downloadable content, and not to include microtransactions.

Sonic Racing, a simplified version developed by Hardlight, was released for iOS on September 19, 2019, as a launch title for Apple's Apple Arcade subscription service. The game was released as part of a deal between Apple and Sega, and Sega does not plan to release it on other platforms.

== Reception ==
Reception

Aggregate scores
| Aggregator | Score |
|---|---|
| Metacritic | NS: 71/100 (Note: Score based on 17 reviews); PS4: 72/100 (Note: Score based on 76 reviews); XONE: 73/100 (Note: Score based on 12 reviews) |
| OpenCritic | 60% recommend |

Review scores
| Publication | Score |
|---|---|
| Destructoid | 7/10 |
| Eurogamer | Recommended |
| Game Informer | 7.25/10 |
| GameSpot | 7/10 |
| GamesRadar+ | 2.5/5 |
| IGN | 8.5/10 |
| Jeuxvideo.com | 14/20 |
| Nintendo Life | 7/10 |
| Shacknews | 9/10 |
| The Guardian | 3/5 |
| USgamer | 3.5/5 |

According to review aggregator website Metacritic, Team Sonic Racing received "mixed or average reviews". Fellow review aggregator OpenCritic assessed that the game received fair approval, being recommended by 60% of critics. Screen Rant observed that critics generally deemed it fun but inferior to the Sega All-Stars titles and Mario Kart 8, which they felt were presented better.

Many critics of the game praised the team-based game play and the track designs as well. IGN stated, "Team Sonic Racing nails what matters most: speed and finesse on the racetrack. The new team system is a fantastic evolution of the arcade racing formula that gives you a real reason to work together, and there's a litany of customization options to keep you coming back to these excellent tracks to earn more." Brian Shia of Game Informer stated, "Team Sonic Racing delivers a fun, easy-to-play experience that bolsters its adequate gameplay with distinct flavors to help it stand out from the rest of the genre." Nintendo Life gave the game a positive review, stating, "It's strangely satisfying when you send some rockets to your 7th place chum and see their ranking climb a few moments later. Even though you're just watching a number change, there's an odd feeling of teamwork done well."

Many were critical of the game's story mode. Game Informer also stated, "The Team Adventure story mode is an inconsequential narrative told through still character images over background environments, making the uninteresting plot even less engaging." GamesRadar+ was also critical of the game's story mode stating, "Team Sonic Racing's campaign includes seven chapters of races, as well as other types of modes like ring collection, target smashes, and elimination rounds, tied together by horribly boring cutscenes made up of static character art. If you're looking to handle the majority of this one alone then the campaign will be your only option. Outside time trials, local play, and online multiplayer, there isn't much else you can play through when you first start out." Many publications criticized its voice acting as well. IGN described it as "[falling] somewhere between laughable and painful to listen to as most voices sound more like parodies than actual characters", only appreciating the ability to skip the voice altogether.

=== Sales ===
The Nintendo Switch version of Team Sonic Racing sold 3,339 copies during its first week on sale in Japan, making it the thirteenth bestselling retail game of the week. The PlayStation 4 version sold 2,432 copies during the same week, placing it at number sixteen on the retail chart. It debuted at the top of the UK all-format sales charts—the first Sonic game to do so since Mario & Sonic at the Olympic Games in 2008—with the PlayStation 4 version selling the most copies. Its launch sales doubled that of Sonic & All Stars Racing: Transformed. In 2021, the game was listed among one of Sega's best selling titles of that year.

By June 2025, Team Sonic Racing had sold 3.5 million copies.

=== Awards ===
The game was nominated for best racing game at the 2018 Game Critics Awards and 2019 Independent Game Developers' Association Awards.
