= Sonic Heroes =

2003 video game

- Developer: Sonic Team USA
- Publisher: Sega
- Director: Takashi Iizuka
- Producer: Yuji Naka
- Designers: Takashi Iizuka; Eitaro Toyoda
- Artist: Kazuyuki Hoshino
- Writer: Shiro Maekawa
- Composers: Jun Senoue; Tomoya Ohtani; Naofumi Hataya; Keiichi Sugiyama; Hideaki Kobayashi; Mariko Nanba; Fumie Kumatani
- Series: Sonic the Hedgehog
- Engine: RenderWare
- Platforms: GameCube; PlayStation 2; Xbox; Windows
- Release: December 30, 2003: PlayStation 2, Xbox, GameCube; JP: December 30, 2003; NA: January 6, 2004 (GCN); NA: January 27, 2004 (Xbox, PS2); EU: February 2, 2004 Microsoft Windows; NA: November 16, 2004; EU: November 26, 2004; JP: December 9, 2004
- Genre: Platform
- Modes: Single-player, multiplayer

Sonic Heroes (Note: Japanese: ソニック ヒーローズ, Hepburn: Sonikku Hirozu) is a 2003 platform game developed by Sonic Team USA and published by Sega for the GameCube, PlayStation 2, Xbox, and Windows. The player controls teams of three Sonic characters and navigates levels while collecting rings, defeating robots, and avoiding obstacles. They swap between characters, who each have unique abilities, to overcome obstacles. Sonic Heroes downplays the action-adventure and exploration-based gameplay of previous 3D Sonic games in favor of linear gameplay similar to the Sega Genesis Sonic games.

Sonic Team began working on Heroes following the completion of Sonic Adventure 2 (2001); Takashi Iizuka and Yuji Naka reprised their roles as director and producer. Heroes was the first multi-platform Sonic game, developed following Sega's discontinuation of the Dreamcast and transition to third-party development. Iizuka opted to design Heroes as a standalone game rather than a sequel to Adventure 2 to appeal to a broader audience. Sonic Team revived elements not seen since the Genesis Sonic games, such as special stages and the Chaotix characters.

Sega released Sonic Heroes in Japan in December 2003 and worldwide in early 2004. It received mixed reviews; critics praised the visuals, sound, fast gameplay, and similarities to the Genesis games, but were divided over the team-based gameplay and criticized the camera and voice acting. Some deemed it an improvement over the previous 3D Sonic games, but others felt it failed to address their problems. Heroes was a commercial success; it sold 3.41 million copies worldwide, and was the bestselling 3D Sonic game until Sonic Frontiers (2022).

== Gameplay ==
Sonic, Tails, and Knuckles in the Grand Metropolis stage

Sonic Heroes is a 3D platformer. While the preceding Sonic Adventure games for the Dreamcast featured elements of action-adventure and exploration, Sonic Heroes focuses on linear platforming and action, similar to the Sonic the Hedgehog games for the Sega Genesis. The story is also simpler than those of the Sonic Adventure games. In it, series antagonist Doctor Eggman threatens to use a weapon to destroy the world and sends out legions of robots. Four groups of three characters from the franchise's history separately team up to put a stop to Eggman's plans. The player navigates using one of the teams, who serve as the player characters. The teams include Team Sonic, which consists of series regulars Sonic the Hedgehog, Tails, and Knuckles the Echidna; Team Dark, which includes Shadow the Hedgehog and Rouge the Bat from Sonic Adventure 2, and new character E-123 Omega (considered a spiritual successor to E-102 Gamma from Sonic Adventure); Team Rose, which has Amy Rose, Cream the Rabbit and Cheese from Sonic Advance 2 (2002), and Big the Cat from Sonic Adventure; and Team Chaotix, consisting of Espio the Chameleon, Charmy Bee, and Vector the Crocodile from Knuckles' Chaotix (1995). Each team has its own campaign, called a story. Each also represents a different difficulty. Amy's team, for example, is designed for beginners, while Shadow's is aimed at more experienced players.

The game begins with a tutorial followed by fourteen normal levels and seven boss fights. Gameplay is generally similar in each story: the player must race through levels to advance the story and collect rings for protection and lives. Level themes vary from beaches to casinos. When the player reaches the end of a level, they are graded based on their performance; an "A" rank is highest, while an "E" is lowest. Enemy robots are scattered around levels and must be defeated by jumping on them or other means of attack. The level designs differ slightly between each story. Espio, Charmy, and Vector's levels are distinguished from the other teams' because they are mission-based, requiring players to fulfill a specific objective, like collecting items, to clear a level.

Teams contain three character types: Speed (such as Sonic), Flight (such as Tails), and Power (such as Knuckles), which the player toggles between. Speed characters can perform attacks that allow them to lock onto enemies and objects, triangle jump between adjacent walls, dash across trails of rings, and can form whirlwinds to climb up poles. Flight characters can temporarily fly and attack airborne enemies, while Power characters can break through objects and glide on gusts of air. By acquiring power cores or reaching checkpoints, characters can level up, becoming more efficient when fighting enemies, though these level up items are lost if the player loses a life.

By collecting keys hidden within levels and reaching the end of a level without getting hit, players can enter special stages. In special stages, players dash across a tube, collecting spheres containing boost power while avoiding obstacles. There are two types of special stages: Bonus Challenge and Emerald Challenge. Bonus Challenges are optional and award the player with extra lives. Emerald Challenges task the player with catching a Chaos Emerald before it disappears.

If players collect all seven Emeralds and clear each story, an additional Last Story is unlocked. The Last Story reveals the plot was orchestrated by Metal Sonic, Eggman's top enforcer and a robotic copy of Sonic, in an effort to destroy his namesake. Outside the main game, players can unlock promotional trailers to view and music to listen to. The game also features a split screen multiplayer mode, in which two players can race or battle. Challenges in the multiplayer mode include kart racing and collecting as many rings as possible.

== Plot ==
Sonic, Tails, and Knuckles receive a letter from Doctor Eggman, telling them that in three days, he will launch his Egg Fleet in an attempt to take over the world, challenging them to stop him. Rouge infiltrates one of Eggman's bases, where she is surprised to discover Shadow, last seen falling from the Space Colony ARK, asleep in a pod. When she awakens him and one of Eggman's robots, E-123 Omega, from their stasis, the three reluctantly agree to work together, with Omega wanting revenge for being locked up and Shadow, who has amnesia, wanting answers regarding who he is. Amy helps Big and Cream track down Big's pet, Froggy, and Cheese's brother, Chocola Chao, who were both reportedly kidnapped by Sonic. The Chaotix Detective Agency (Vector, Espio, and Charmy) receive a job offer from a mysterious client, where they execute a series of tasks to prove themselves.

The four teams chase down Eggman through various zones, crossing paths with each other at several points, until they all end up on the Egg Fleet. There, Rouge discovers an armada of Shadow Androids, wondering if their Shadow is just one of them too. The Chaotix end up rescuing their mystery client, revealed to be Eggman. He explains that he was locked up and betrayed by Metal Sonic, now going by "Neo Metal Sonic", who had adopted the guise of Eggman and taken control of the Egg Fleet to prove himself superior to Sonic. Using the data he collected from observing all the teams in action, as well as the power of Chaos copied from Froggy and Chocola, he transforms into his ultimate state, the "Metal Overlord". Using the power of the Chaos Emeralds all the teams had collected, they work together to take down Metal, with Sonic turning Super (accompanied by Tails and Knuckles) to defeat him. After Metal Sonic is defeated and reverts to his original form, everyone goes their separate ways, while the Chaotix chase after Eggman, demanding payment from him.

== Development ==
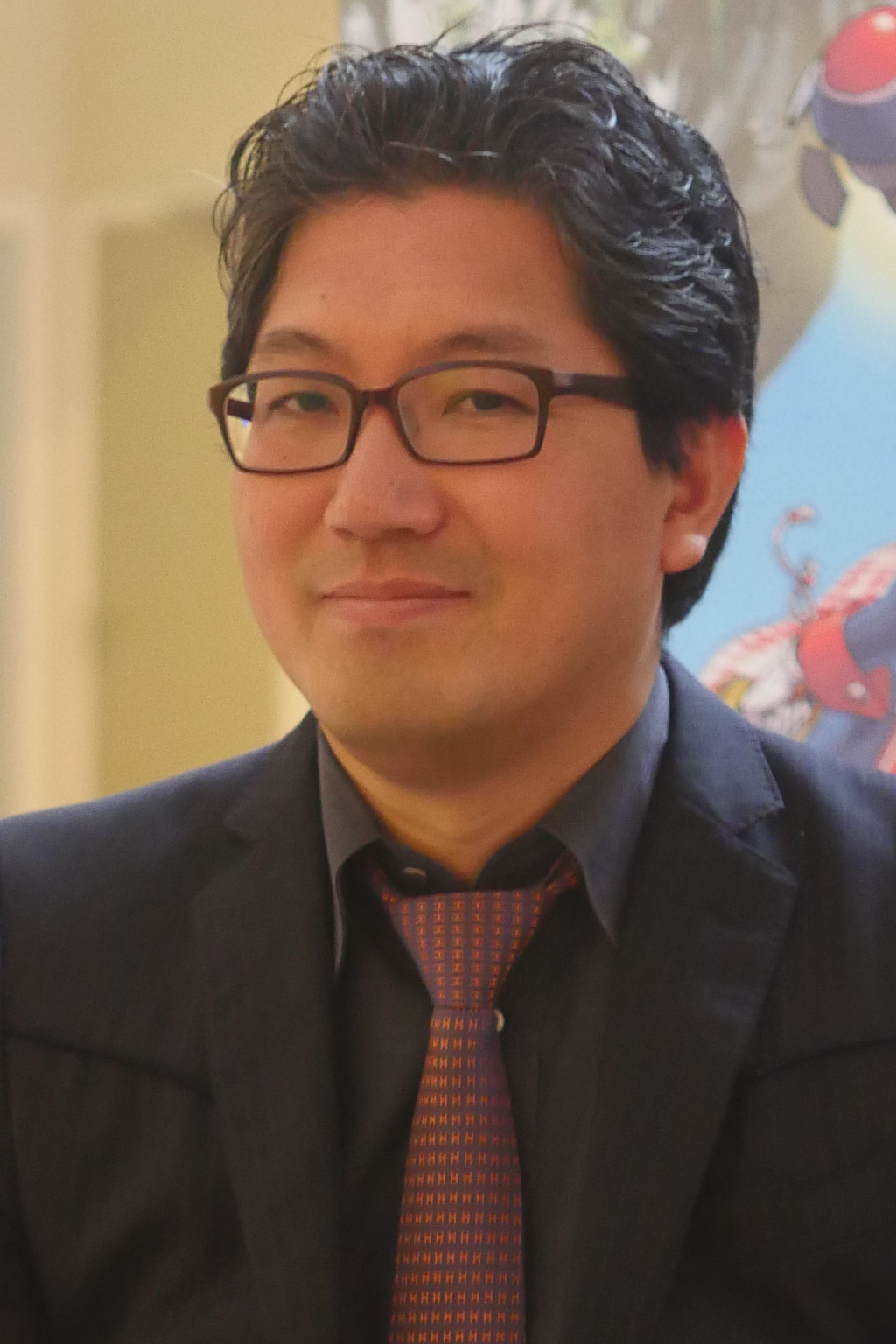
Yuji Naka, the producer of Sonic Heroes, in 2015

Sonic Heroes was developed by the 19-member Sonic Team USA in San Francisco to commemorate the Sonic series' 12th anniversary. Development was led by producer Yuji Naka and director/lead designer Takashi Iizuka, and lasted 20 months. The majority of the development team had worked on previous Sonic games. Iizuka did not want to make a sequel to Sonic Adventure 2 (2001), as he worried it would only appeal to Sonic fans. Interested in returning to gameplay similar to the Genesis games, Sonic Team decided to design Sonic Heroes so casual players not familiar with Sonic could adapt. Iizuka said the development period of Sonic Heroes was the most stressful of his career because of deadlines and Sega management. A fellow designer became ill, so he worked relentlessly, lost 22 pounds (10 kg), and suffered from insomnia. The deadline became so severe that programmers were ordered to only fix bugs that affected progression in the game. Any bugs that had little to no effect on progression were to be considered "not bugs".

Sonic Heroes was the first multi-platform Sonic game: it was developed for the GameCube, PlayStation 2 (PS2), and Xbox. Unlike the Sonic Adventure games, made using proprietary software, Sonic Team partnered with Criterion Software to use the RenderWare game engine so the game could be programmed and ported with ease to each platform. Though Sonic Team was able to transfer some textures and models from the Sonic Adventure games into Sonic Heroes, most of their work started from scratch. Sonic Team found challenges in working with the Xbox and PS2, platforms with which they had little experience. The content in all versions is the same, but the PS2 version runs at 30 frames per second (FPS) in contrast to the other versions running at 60 FPS. Sega's Noah Musler explained that running the PS2 version at 60 FPS would have caused performance problems. Iizuka also noted the system is less powerful than the GameCube and Xbox. Iizuka and Naka decided against including console-exclusive content so players could have the same experience regardless of console.

Sonic Team was interested in making Sonic Heroes's narrative feature characters teaming up to overcome evil, rather than Sonic Adventure's approach of individual character stories. This led to the conception of the "team action" concept. Iizuka stated Sonic Team had a considerable amount of freedom in designing the game due to its new scope. The Chao-raising system—a staple of the Sonic Adventure games—was removed because Sonic Team feared it would disrupt the pace. To improve replay value, the grading system was made more difficult. The special stages from the 2D games were revived to "refresh players' minds" and change the pace. Player reactions to previous games influenced the design; for example, the team did not include modes like Big's fishing from Sonic Adventure and Tails' shooting from Sonic Adventure 2 after both were criticized.

The Chaotix, who had appeared in the 1995 spinoff game Knuckles' Chaotix, were revived for Sonic Heroes because Sonic Team thought they were unique and had never used them. Iizuka said he did not consider the Chaotix in Sonic Heroes the same team from Knuckles' Chaotix, claiming to have created new characters using the same designs from 1995. The game marks the debut of E-123 Omega in the Sonic series. Sonic Team wanted to include as many teams as possible, but time constraints and a desire to keep the gameplay balanced prevented this. The game features several animated cutscenes produced by Vision Scape Interactive, who had also developed the prototype game Sonic Extreme. Jun Senoue composed the majority of the soundtrack. His hard rock band Crush 40 performed the main theme, "Sonic Heroes", and the final boss theme, "What I'm Made Of". The theme songs for each team were performed by Ted Poley of Danger Danger, Tony Harnell, Kay Hanley of Letters to Cleo, Julien-K, and Gunnar Nelson of Nelson. Iizuka said that the intention was for the music "to return to the roots of the Sonic experience" and be exciting and fast-paced.

Naka believed that Sonic Heroes, a Sonic-themed McDonald's Happy Meal toy line, and the anime television series Sonic X would expose the franchise to a new generation. In North America, a demo of the game was released via a special edition bonus disc packaged with Mario Kart: Double Dash (2003). Sega released Sonic Heroes in Japan on December 30, 2003, two weeks later than intended, to ensure there were "no compromises" in the final product. The GameCube version was released in North America on January 6, 2004, followed by the Xbox and PS2 versions on January 27. The European version was released on February 2, 2004. A Microsoft Windows version was released in North America on November 16, 2004, followed by Europe on November 26 and Japan on December 9. The game was rereleased through the Sonic PC Collection for Windows on October 2, 2009, and the PS2 Classics line for the PlayStation 3 (PS3) on February 22, 2012.

== Reception ==
Reception

Aggregate score
Aggregator	Score
Metacritic	XBOX: 73/100; GCN: 72/100; PC: 66/100; PS2: 64/100

Review scores
Publication	Score
1Up.com	C+
AllGame	2.5/5 (GC); 2.5/5 (PS2); 2.5/5 (Xbox)
Eurogamer	6/10
GameRevolution	3.5/5
GameSpot	7.5/10
GameSpy	3/5
IGN	8/10

Sonic Heroes received generally "mixed or average" reviews, according to the review aggregator website Metacritic. Some reviewers felt the game was better than the previous 3D Sonic games but still below the quality of the 2D games. The PS2 and PC's version's reviews were considerably worse than others; reviewers noted clipping, graphic faults, and its lower frame rate.

The aesthetics and sound were generally well received. IGN lauded detailed, varied, and realistic character models, and wrote that the textures were detailed and crisp. They also praised the realistic shading and lighting effects. Although GameSpot thought the graphics were not much of an improvement from previous games—comparing them to "a glorified Dreamcast game"—they still praised its steady frame rate, art design, and vibrant colors. Eurogamer disliked the shiny models, but was still pleased by the imaginative aesthetics. In regards to the soundtrack, Game Revolution found it upbeat and catchy, offering particular praise for the music of Bingo Highway. Although they called the music laughable and not an improvement from previous games, IGN thought the rest of the sound was high quality, and praised its "perfectly implemented" sound effects running in Dolby Pro Logic II.

Multiple reviewers found the gameplay similar to that of the Genesis Sonic games. GameSpot found Sonic Heroes the closest Sonic Team ever got to recreating the classic 2D Sonic gameplay in 3D. They praised the game for stripping away the shooting and hunting elements from the Sonic Adventure games, and called it "a purer, more action-packed Sonic experience" than previous games. IGN considered Sonic Heroes a major improvement from Sonic Adventure, writing "Sonic Heroes does an absolutely sensational job of re-creating the intensely fast and unpredictable looping, corkscrewing stages from the classic games in 3D". 1UP.com and GameSpy agreed that the game was a step in the right direction for the series. Levi Buchanan of the Chicago Tribune wrote that "when Sonic is in charge, Sonic Heroes is a pure action game. It's an enjoyable throwback to the Genesis era, when Sonic was all about speed, running circles around Mario, collecting rings while Nintendo's plumber searched high and low for his shape-altering mushrooms. And for gamers who have been numb in the thumb long enough to remember those heady days, the return to form is most welcome. (Especially after those underwhelming Dreamcast Sonic Adventure games that Sega ported to the GameCube.)" Reviewers called the casino level, Bingo Highway, a highlight.

Reviewers were generally divided over the team-based gameplay. GameSpy argued it was well-balanced and thought it greatly increased the replay value. IGN offered similar praise, praising its easy-to-learn, strategic controls. Game Revolution wrote the system added diversity. However, IGN also thought it was not as ambitious as expected and did not change the overall experience. GameSpot agreed the controls were easy, but considered the large number of teams unnecessary: "no one cares about these peripheral characters... People play Sonic games to play as Sonic the Hedgehog". 1UP found the concept was more repetitive than innovative. Eurogamer considered the gameplay original but "boring and obvious" and thought that the controls were clunky and unorthodox. While Eurogamer argued Sonic Heroes was not difficult, Game Revolution described it as hard to a fault, exclaiming they "[died] all the time." Buchanan wrote that "when you switch away from Sonic and Tails, the game itself kind of stops cold. Especially when you play as one of the other three teams that feature ancillary characters from Sonic’s stable as they play through similar levels with slightly different goals." Charles Herold of The New York Times wrote that "getting stuck on the fourth level exposed one of the game's major flaws: the levels are fairly static. The old 2-D Sonic games always seemed to have several different routes through different landscapes. Jump across a chasm, and you could take a mountainside path; miss the jump, and you would run through the valley below. You could play these levels repeatedly and rarely take the exact same route. But while in Heroes you occasionally come to a fork in the road, you are likely to find yourself running basically the same trail every time you go through a level. This is disappointing, and especially surprising considering the team play element. With three characters whose different abilities let them overcome different challenges, it would make sense to have dozens of areas per level where the various characters can lead you to different paths. But the game too rarely capitalizes on this potential."

The game was criticized for not addressing the problems of prior Sonic games. 1UP wrote the problems with the camera and "hit-or-miss lock-on attacks that leave you plunging to your doom" that plagued the Sonic Adventure games were still present in Sonic Heroes and hurt the experience greatly. GameSpot said although the camera worked well most of the time, coordination between camera position and character movement caused problems, such that pushing forward may not move the character in the same direction the camera is facing. They also wrote that the game suffered from problems with the collision detection and noted all the shortcomings were present in the Sonic Adventure games. IGN agreed the camera had not been improved. The voice acting was especially derided; IGN joked players should "turn down the volume during cut-scenes", and GameSpy compared the voice work to the likes of Playskool.

The editors of GameSpot ultimately named Sonic Heroes the best GameCube game of January 2004, and called it "the fastest and most authentic 3D Sonic experience we've seen yet."

=== Sales ===
Sonic Heroes was a major commercial success. By October 2004, the game had sold over one million copies in Europe. The PlayStation 2 version received a "Double Platinum" sales award from the Entertainment and Leisure Software Publishers Association (ELSPA), indicating sales of at least 600,000 copies in the United Kingdom. According to Sega's financial reports, Sonic Heroes sold 1.42 million units from its release to March 2004 (850,000 in the U.S., 420,000 in Europe, and 150,000 in Japan), 1.57 million units from March 2004 to March 2005, and 420,000 units in the U.S. from March 2006 to March 2007, for total sales of at least 3.41 million. By the end of 2004, it had been branded as part of the Player's Choice line on the GameCube, the Greatest Hits line on the PS2, and the Platinum Hits line on the Xbox. It was the bestselling 3D Sonic game until 2023, when it was surpassed by Sonic Frontiers (2022).

== Legacy ==
After Sonic Heroes, Sonic Team USA was renamed Sega Studios USA. Their next project was Shadow the Hedgehog (2005), a spinoff starring Shadow set shortly after the events of Sonic Heroes. In 2008, after working on a few more games, the division was merged with Sonic Team in Japan. In a 2017 series retrospective, USgamer ranked Sonic Heroes among the franchise's bottom half of games. They wrote that the system of switching between characters was unwieldy and annoying, but still interesting because it made the game feel like a puzzle video game. They also praised the design of E-123 Omega.

Sonic Heroes marked the debut of recurring Sonic character E-123 Omega, and reintroduced the obscure Chaotix. Its concept of switching between characters as necessary was reused in Sonic Team's Sonic Forces (2017) and Sumo Digital's Team Sonic Racing (2019); Sumo Digital cited it as inspiration for their game. The Seaside Hill level reappears in the 20th anniversary game Sonic Generations for PS3, Xbox 360, and Windows, while the Nintendo 3DS version includes the special stages and the Egg Emperor boss fight. In the game's remaster, Sonic X Shadow Generations, the Rail Canyon level and Metal Overlord boss fight return. Stages from the game have also appeared in various Sonic spinoff games, including Mario & Sonic at the Olympic Winter Games (2009), Sonic & Sega All-Stars Racing (2010), Sonic & All-Stars Racing Transformed (2012), the mobile game Sonic Dash (2013) and Sonic Racing: CrossWorlds (2025).
