= Sonic the Hedgehog 4: Episode I =

2010 video game

- Developers: Dimps; Sonic Team
- Publisher: Sega
- Director: Toshiyuki Nagahara
- Producers: Takashi Iizuka; Hiroyuki Kawano
- Designer: Yukihiro Higashi
- Programmer: Katsuya Kuramoto
- Artists: Hideaki Moriya; Yuji Uekawa; Shinji Matsuura; Michikazu Tamamura
- Composer: Jun Senoue
- Series: Sonic the Hedgehog
- Platforms: iOS, Wii, PlayStation 3, Xbox 360, Windows, Windows Phone, Android, BlackBerry Tablet OS
- Release: October 7, 2010: iOS; WW: October 7, 2010 Wii; NA: October 11, 2010; JP: October 12, 2010; PAL: October 15, 2010 PlayStation 3; NA/JP: October 12, 2010; PAL: October 13, 2010 Xbox 360; WW: October 13, 2010 Windows Phone; WW: June 15, 2011 Windows; WW: January 19, 2012 Android; WW: January 25, 2012 BlackBerry Tablet OS; WW: July 20, 2012
- Genre: Platform
- Mode: Single-player

Sonic the Hedgehog 4: Episode I (Note: Japanese: ソニック・ザ・ヘッジホッグ4(フォー) エピソードI(ワン), Hepburn: Sonikku za Hejjihoggu Fō: Episōdo Wan) is a 2010 platform game developed by Dimps, with assistance from Sonic Team, and published by Sega. It is a sequel to Sonic & Knuckles (1994), following Sonic as he sets out to stop a returning Doctor Eggman. Like the Sonic the Hedgehog games released for the Sega Genesis, Episode I features side-scrolling gameplay, with movement restricted to a 2D plane. The player races through levels collecting rings while rolling into a ball to attack enemies. The game also features special stages in which the player collects Chaos Emeralds and online leaderboards comparing level completion times and high scores.

Development began in May 2009 and lasted a year and a half. The game was conceived as a smartphone-exclusive spin-off before becoming a multiplatform, mainline Sonic installment. As a continuation of the Genesis Sonic games, Episode I features a simple control scheme, no voice acting, level design emphasizing platforming and momentum-based gameplay, and no player characters besides Sonic; however, it incorporates Sonic's design and abilities from later games like Sonic Adventure (1998). It was designed to appeal to both older Sonic fans who played the Genesis games and newer ones who played more recent ones like Sonic Unleashed (2008). Producer Takashi Iizuka and composer Jun Senoue were the only Sonic 4 developers who contributed to the Genesis games.

Episode I was released in October 2010 as a downloadable game for iOS, PlayStation 3, Wii, and Xbox 360. Versions for Windows Phone, Windows, Android, and BlackBerry Tablet OS followed throughout 2011 and 2012. The game received moderately positive reviews and sold more than one million copies within a year. Critics described Episode I as a satisfying return to classic Sonic gameplay and praised the sense of nostalgia. Criticism was directed at its physics engine, considered inferior to that of the Genesis games, and its short length. Episode I was planned as the first episode in a trilogy; Episode II was released in May 2012, while Episode III was cancelled.

== Gameplay ==
Sonic the Hedgehog 4: Episode I is a side-scrolling platform game similar in gameplay and style to the 1990s Sonic the Hedgehog games for the Sega Genesis. The story begins shortly after the events of Sonic & Knuckles (1994). Sonic the Hedgehog parts with his friends, Miles "Tails" Prower and Knuckles the Echidna, to explore new territories on his own. However, series antagonist Doctor Eggman—who survived his defeat in Sonic & Knuckles—resurfaces, refines some of his past robots, and initiates a plan to get rid of Sonic. Sonic 4 is presented from a 2.5D perspective; although movement is restricted to a 2D plane, characters and objects are rendered in 3D. Sonic, the only player character of the single-player game, can move left or right to gain speed, jump, and roll into a ball to attack enemy robots. Sonic can also perform the "homing attack" from the 3D Sonic games; when in midair, he can lock on to robots or objects and home in on them. In some cases, chaining homing attacks opens access to alternate pathways.

Sonic races around a corkscrew in Splash Hill Zone, the game's first level.

The game takes place across four levels called zones, each split into three acts. Unlike the Genesis Sonic games, after completing the first act, the player can freely choose which zone to play via a world map. The levels are based on locations from the original Sonic the Hedgehog (1991) and Sonic the Hedgehog 2 (1992), (Note: Splash Hill and Lost Labyrinth are based on Green Hill and Labyrinth from Sonic the Hedgehog, while Casino Street and Mad Gear are based on Casino Night and Metropolis from Sonic the Hedgehog 2.) and feature elements such as slopes, bottomless pits, vertical loops, corkscrews, springs, and boost pads, as well as power-ups like shields, invincibility, and speed shoes. Some levels feature unique elements, like vines or pinball flippers and bumpers. After the player completes a zone's acts, they unlock a boss encounter with Eggman. Boss encounters feature Eggman piloting one of his robots, and the player must hit him eight times to defeat him. Completing all four zones unlocks a fifth and final level. Like other Sonic games, Sonic collects rings as a form of health: if the player is in possession of at least one ring and is hit by an enemy or hazard, they will survive, but their rings will scatter and blink before disappearing. If the player is hit with no rings, falls in a pit, or drowns, they lose a life, and will receive a game over if all lives are lost.

If the player finishes an act with 50 or more rings, they will have the option to access a special stage. The special stages in Episode I are based on those from Sonic the Hedgehog, in which Sonic is curled in a ball and bounces off the bumpers and walls of a fully rotating maze. The player must tilt the playing field to navigate Sonic through the maze within a time limit, collecting rings to open gates and time bonuses along the way. Finishing the special stage rewards the player with one of the seven Chaos Emeralds. By collecting all seven, the player unlocks the ability to transform into Super Sonic, granting them invincibility and increased speed at the cost of one ring a second. Collecting the Chaos Emeralds also unlocks a brief post-credits scene that shows a silhouette of Metal Sonic, teasing the events of Sonic the Hedgehog 4: Episode II (2012). Players are also able to upload their game information to online leaderboards to compare level completion times and high scores.

Each version of the game is mostly identical, save for differences in screen size and resolution. For instance, the PlayStation 3, Xbox 360, and Windows versions support high-definition and widescreen displays, whereas the Wii version does not. Additionally, the PlayStation 3 and Wii versions both support their systems' respective motion controllers. The mobile versions can be controlled with either the accelerometers or virtual buttons on the touchscreen. Two levels exclusive to these versions are designed around the use of the accelerometers.

== Development ==
Old-school Sonic fans have long asked to see Sonic return to a more 2D style of gameplay. Many liked the daytime stages in Unleashed but wanted to see a game that plays purely similar to the early games of the Genesis. Project Needlemouse is that critical first step that brings Sonic back to his 2D roots.

— Sega's Ken Balough, when asked why Sonic the Hedgehog 4: Episode I was commissioned.

According to project head Takashi Iizuka, Sonic 4 was conceived in January 2009; development began four months later and lasted about a year and a half. Dimps, which had previously developed Sonic platformers for the Game Boy Advance and Nintendo DS, led development, with assistance from Sonic Team. Sonic Team's Toshiyuki Nagahara served as director. The only developers on the team who contributed to the Genesis games were producer Iizuka and composer Jun Senoue. The game was announced on September 11, 2009 under the working title Project Needlemouse. Its proper title, Sonic the Hedgehog 4: Episode I, was revealed on February 4, 2010, alongside the debut of in-game footage.

Brand manager Ken Balough stated that Sonic 4 was conceived following fan requests for a return to classic Sonic gameplay. He acknowledged the divide between older Sonic fans who played the Genesis games and younger ones who played more recent games like Sonic Unleashed (2008), and said Sega needed to cater to both demographics. In an interview with Nintendo Life, Balough said that "[w]hen we started discussing doing a 2D Sonic game, it just made sense that we would make Sonic 4. It's a game fans have been asking about for years, and we felt we had the right team to make it." While Balough said the game was always called Sonic 4, according to journalist Kurt Kalata, Sonic 4 was not conceived as a mainline, numbered Sonic game, but rather as a smartphone-exclusive spin-off called Sonic the Portable that took advantage of those devices' gyroscope functions. Kalata wrote that it was retitled Sonic 4 at the behest of Sega's American branch and made a multiplatform release, and noted that one of the game's levels still features signs that say Sonic the Portable.

Iizuka noted that since Sonic Adventure was released in 1998, the Sonic series began to have a greater emphasis on speed. However, he also acknowledged many fans still enjoyed the Genesis games, as evidenced from their popularity on digital distribution platforms. With Sonic 4, Iizuka was motivated to return to the classic Sonic style with modern technologies. To stay faithful to the original Genesis games, the developers chose not to include voice acting. The team began development using elements they considered vital to the Sonic series: a simple control scheme—with jumping and attacking controlled by a single button—and level design emphasizing platforming and momentum-based gameplay. To establish Episode I as a successor to the Genesis games, the developers chose to revive those games' level locales to, as Iizuka explained, "tap into that nostalgia factor. Essentially we wanted people to recognize this was a continuation from the [Genesis] era Sonics." While the content in all versions is mostly the same, two levels in the mobile version were replaced in the console releases. These two levels were supposed to be retained across all releases, but they were designed around the use of a smartphone gyroscope, and the team did not think they translated well to a console.

One new addition was Sonic's homing attack from Sonic Adventure; Iizuka said the team "wanted to add that excitement of performing continuous attacks" and felt it "add[ed] to the classic-style gameplay by providing a new means to discover routes in the sky". Though a return to the classic Sonic formula, Sonic the Hedgehog 4: Episode I does not reuse Sonic's original design, instead retaining his post-Adventure design. Iizuka reasoned this was because the game was "not a remake." Following the project's announcement, in January 2010 Sega began a countdown with a list that discounted potential playable characters. When fans answered trivia questions, the list got whittled down, and culminated with the reveal that Sonic would be the only playable character. Iizuka said this decision was made because the team wanted both old and new fans to be able to enjoy the game. The decision to scale back the series' extensive cast was also identified as a way to return to the series' roots. Despite this, the post-credits scene teases the reintroduction of Metal Sonic, who had not appeared in a Sonic game for years. Balough stated that fans had been asking Sega to bring back Metal Sonic for years, and that the post-credits scene was added to keep players excited for Episode II.

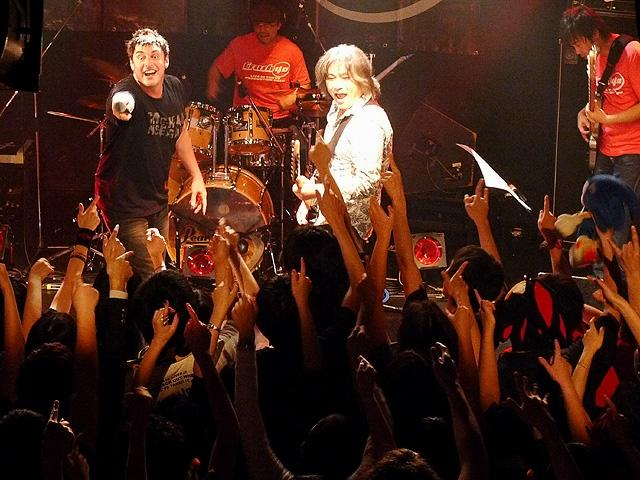
Sonic the Hedgehog 4: Episode I composer Jun Senoue (center) in 2012

Senoue only composed some tracks for the Genesis Sonic games, but for Sonic 4, he was responsible for creating all the music and sound effects. The music was written to replicate the style of the Genesis Sonic games because, according to Balough, the developers wanted the game to feel "like a genuine extension of the first three Sonic games". Senoue was involved with the project early on when Iizuka approached him to ask him to compose. Senoue said that he attempted to compose the tracks as if he had been composing them for the Genesis, using as few notes as possible. He did not use any FM sound tapes, although he did unsuccessfully attempt to find an old Genesis development kit. Senoue attempted to compose tracks "with a similar beat or similar tempo" to those from Sonic the Hedgehog and Sonic the Hedgehog 2. Senoue had fun working on Episode I and said his favorite track was the first level's, although Nagahara hated it and tried to persuade Senoue to compose a replacement tune. Eggman's theme was repurposed from an unused Sonic 3D Blast (1996) track.

== Release ==
Episode I was originally scheduled for release in July 2010, a timeframe Sega announced in February 2010. Months before the game's release, a prototype version was made available to users of the Xbox 360's game testing service PartnerNet. Screenshots and footage were leaked and widely distributed across the internet, and PartnerNet had to be temporarily shut down as a result. Though some video game journalists responded favorably to the leaked materials, fans reacted negatively. In May 2010, Sega announced that Episode I had been delayed to late 2010 in response to both internal and fan feedback; Iizuka later clarified that the delay was done so the developers could replace the mobile-exclusive levels with ones better suited for consoles.

Episode I was released on October 7, 2010, for iOS. Releases for other platforms soon followed: the Wii version was released via WiiWare in North America on October 11 and in Europe on October 15; the PlayStation 3 version was released via PlayStation Network in North America on October 12 and in Europe on October 13; and the Xbox 360 version was released via Xbox Live Arcade on October 13. Other releases included a Windows Phone version on June 15, 2011; a Windows version via Steam on January 19, 2012; an Android version on January 25, 2012; and a BlackBerry Tablet OS version on July 20, 2012. Additionally, both Episode I and Episode II were released for the Android-powered Ouya on July 9, 2013.

In April 2016, the iOS version was updated for the first time in three years to modernize it for newer devices. Changes included support for widescreen and Retina displays, more detailed character models, and refined textures. The iOS version was initially split into separate versions for iPhone and iPad; the update discontinued the iPad version and made the iPhone one a "universal" application, meaning it works across all iOS devices. Later in 2016, the Xbox 360 versions of Episode I and Episode II were added to the Xbox One's catalog of backward compatible games.

== Reception ==
Reception

Aggregate score
| Aggregator | Score |
|---|---|
| Metacritic | (Wii) 81/100 (PS3) 74/100 (X360) 72/100 (iOS) 70/100 |

Review scores
| Publication | Score |
|---|---|
| 1Up.com | B |
| Eurogamer | 9/10 |
| GameRevolution | B− |
| GamesMaster | 88% |
| GameSpot | 6.5/10 |
| GamesRadar+ | 4.5/5 |
| GameTrailers | 7.5/10 |
| IGN | 8/10 (iOS) 7.5/10 |
| NGamer | 10/10 |
| Nintendo Life | 8/10 |
| Nintendo World Report | 8/10 |
| Official Nintendo Magazine | 88% |
| Digital Spy | 3/5 |

According to review aggregator Metacritic, the Wii version received "generally favorable reviews", while the both iOS and other console versions received "mixed or average reviews". IGN's Hilary Goldstein gave the game a score of 8.0 and an Editor's Choice award, calling it "short but sweet and well worth downloading." GamesRadar+'s Justin Towell gave it a score of 9/10, calling it "deserving of the name, Sonic the Hedgehog 4." 1UP.com's Kat Bailey gave it a B rank, praising the game's speed while criticizing some occasional poor design, such as boss battles and puzzles. GameTrailers gave it a 7.5, calling it a worthy investment for Sonic fans. Digital Spy gave it three out of five stars, with reviewer Liam Martin answering the question of whether or not it lived up to its hype: "Despite some issues with the size of the game and its difficulty (it's very easy), the answer is yes, but only just." Eurogamer's Ellie Gibson gave it a 9/10, calling it "gloriously fun" and "brilliantly paced."

The game's physics were met with major criticism, with the general consensus being that they were inferior to the momentum-based physics from the Genesis games. On YouTube, hundreds of gameplay videos were posted by fans showcasing several oddities.

The game was a commercial success, selling over a million copies across all platforms by 2011, according to Sega of America CEO Mike Hayes.

== Legacy ==
Episode I was envisioned as the first installment of an episodic video game trilogy. Shortly before Episode I's release, Balough confirmed that Sega had planned the entire Sonic 4 story. While he did not confirm the number of episodes, he said "[they] will definitely make up a larger game. After completing them all, you'll have experienced a larger overall story arc that lives up to the epic nature of earlier Sonics." In August 2011, Iizuka stated that Episode II would not be released until 2012 (over a year after Episode I) so Sonic Team could focus on Sonic Generations. Ahead of Episode II, Sega rereleased Sonic CD (1993) for modern consoles, and advertised it as a prequel to Sonic 4.

Episode II, released in May 2012, reintroduces Tails and Metal Sonic, and follows Sonic and Tails as they attempt to prevent Eggman and Metal Sonic from relaunching the Death Egg. Fan input from Episode I played a significant role in the development of Episode II, as the developers worked to address aspects fans took issue with, such as the physics engine. Episode II was released on most platforms that Episode I was available on, although the Wii version was canceled due to hardware constraints. Players who own both episodes on a single platform unlock the ability to play as Metal Sonic in Episode I's levels.

In March 2012, Iizuka announced that Sega did not plan to continue Sonic 4 beyond Episode II. In 2015, Australian developer Christian Whitehead said that he had been offered the opportunity to develop Episode III with Sega Studios Australia before that division was shut down, and he instead worked on remasters of Sonic the Hedgehog and Sonic the Hedgehog 2 between 2012 and 2013. He said that while it was possible that Episode III could eventually be made, it was unlikely. Whitehead would go on to lead the development of Sonic Mania (2017), which, like Sonic 4, acts as a sequel to the Genesis Sonic games. Sonic 4 and Sonic Mania were frequently compared, with journalists viewing Sonic 4 unfavorably in contrast to Mania.

In April 2025, an unused Episode II ending cutscene surfaced online; it depicts the Master Emerald rebooting the Death Egg after Sonic and Tails disable it during Episode II's conclusion and features a cameo from Knuckles. ComicBook.com wrote that the cutscene suggests Episode III would have featured Eggman tricking Knuckles into helping him.
