= Sonic the Hedgehog 3 (soundtrack) =

Sonic the Hedgehog 3: Music from the Motion Picture

Film score by Tom Holkenborg
- Released: December 20, 2024
- Recorded: 2024
- Studios: Angel Recording Studios, London
- Genre: Film score
- Length: 63:03
- Label: Milan
- Producer: Tom Holkenborg

Tom Holkenborg chronology
Furiosa: A Mad Max Saga (2024)	Sonic the Hedgehog 3 (2024)

Sonic the Hedgehog 3: Music from the Motion Picture is the score album for the 2024 film of the same name. It features the original score composed by Tom Holkenborg and was released by Milan Records on December 20, 2024.

== Background ==
Tom Holkenborg, who composed the score for the first two Sonic films, returned to score Sonic the Hedgehog 3 and had finished work by July 2024. In December 2023, Crush 40 vocalist Johnny Gioeli said there had been talks of including the song "Live & Learn" from Sonic Adventure 2 (2001) in the film. In February 2024, Gioeli confirmed "Live & Learn" would be included in the film. Jelly Roll released a single for the film, titled "Run It", on November 21, 2024. The film also features the song "Neon" from Japanese rock band One Ok Rock, who previously contributed to the soundtrack for the 2022 game Sonic Frontiers. "It's a Sonic Christmas", the song performed by Ruwanga Samath and featured in the promotional short film of the same name, was released on digital platforms on December 13, 2024. The soundtrack album was released by Milan Records on December 20, 2024. Busted singer James Bourne wrote a song for the film's soundtrack that ultimately went unused in the film for unknown reasons.

== Content ==
The song "Live & Learn" (performed by Crush 40) is introduced in the opening scene of Sonic the Hedgehog 3 as a riff that Maria Robotnik plays on her guitar, from then on functioning as a leitmotif for Shadow the Hedgehog. The vocal version, remixed by the film's composer, appears when Sonic and Shadow transform into Super Sonic and Super Shadow to stop the Eclipse Cannon from destroying the Earth. Other songs from Sonic Adventure 2 are referenced in the film's soundtrack, including "Escape From The City" and "Event: The Last Scene".

== Reception ==
Cameron Frew of Dexerto called the score "superb", praising its incorporation of video game music and the accompanying licensed tracks. Mike Reyes of CinemaBlend similarly commended the addition of the video games' musical cues, feeling that it enhanced the experience. Matt Donata of The A.V. Club said "Shadow's motorcycle and handgun combo earn their spotlight, as do the musical cues, none more blissful than Crush 40's Sonic Adventure 2 theme song "Live & Learn" hitting at a pivotal moment during composer Tom Holkenborg's third-act crescendo".

== Track listing ==
All music is composed by Tom Holkenborg.

Sonic the Hedgehog 3: Music from the Motion Picture track listing
No.	Title	Length
1.	"It All Starts with This"	1:01
2.	"The Ultimate Lifeform"	1:41
3.	"Green Hills, Present"	1:06
4.	"New Day, New Adventure"	2:18
5.	"Talk About Low Budget Flights"	1:27
6.	"We're Outta Here!"	0:30
7.	"Wow... He's Fast"	3:48
8.	"La Ultima Passion"	0:47
9.	"Habanera"	0:34
10.	"A Rotten Eggman"	1:11
11.	"The Eclipse Cannon"	0:57
12.	""MA-RI-A""	2:19
13.	"Wishes Are Eternal"	1:50
14.	"The Truth of 50 Years Ago"	1:30
15.	"I Found You Faker!"	4:06
16.	"That Mad Scientist!"	3:30
17.	"Throw It All Away"	0:59
18.	"I'll Make It Through"	3:06
19.	"La Ultima Passion Pt.2"	0:41
20.	"G.U.N. Control"	2:18
21.	"Big Time Villains"	2:16
22.	"No Time for Games"	1:19
23.	"Feel My Loss, and Despair"	1:40
24.	"I Can't Let You Live"	3:21
25.	"I Die Hard"	2:06
26.	"For All the People On That Planet"	1:58
27.	"Live and Learn" (Junkie XL version)	0:49
28.	"E.G.G.M.E.N."	3:42
29.	"Too Easy, Piece of Cake"	1:16
30.	"Last Story"	4:32
31.	"Sayonara, Shadow the Hedgehog"	1:43
32.	"Green Hills, Good Future"	1:04
33.	"The Edge of Tomorrow"	1:38
Total length:		63:03

== Additional music ==
Additional music featured in the film includes the following:

- "99 Red Balloons" by Goldfinger
- "Neon" by One Ok Rock
- "I Want You Back" by Folder (originally by Jackson 5)
- "Lollipop" by Tempura Kidz
- "Firestarter" by The Prodigy
- "End of the Line" by Traveling Wilburys
- "Wouldn't It Be Nice" by The Beach Boys
- "London Town" by Mr Eazi
- "Galvanize" by The Chemical Brothers
- "E.G.G.M.A.N." by Paul Shortino
- "Live & Learn" by Crush 40
- "Run It" by Jelly Roll

== Credits ==
Credits adapted from Film Music Reporter:

- Music editor: Daniel Waldman
- Score producer, programmer, mixing and mastering: Tom Holkenborg
- Additional music: Ching-Shan Chang, Luca Fagagnini, Jack Roberts, Berend Salverda
- Orchestrators: Jonathan Beard, Edward Trybek, Henri Wilkinson, Tom Holkenborg
- Score copier: Jordan Cox
- Score conductor: Gavin Greenaway
- Score recorder: Casey Stone
- Technical score engineers: Michael Staffeldt
- Score recorded at Angel Studios, UK
- Orchestra mix: Alan Meyerson
- Recordist: Matt Jones
- Score mixed at Computer Hell Cabin
- Score coordinators: Joanne Changer, Kayla Hopkins
- Studio assistant: Marta Di Nozzi
- Music production services: Michiel Groeneveld
- Music production assistant: Frankie Cail
- Musician contractor: Susie Gillis & Amy Ewens for Isobel Griffiths, Ltd.
- Music librarian: Jill Streater
- Solo acoustic guitar: Glenn Sharp

== See also ==
- Music of Sonic the Hedgehog
