= Music of Sonic the Hedgehog =

Music composed for video game franchise

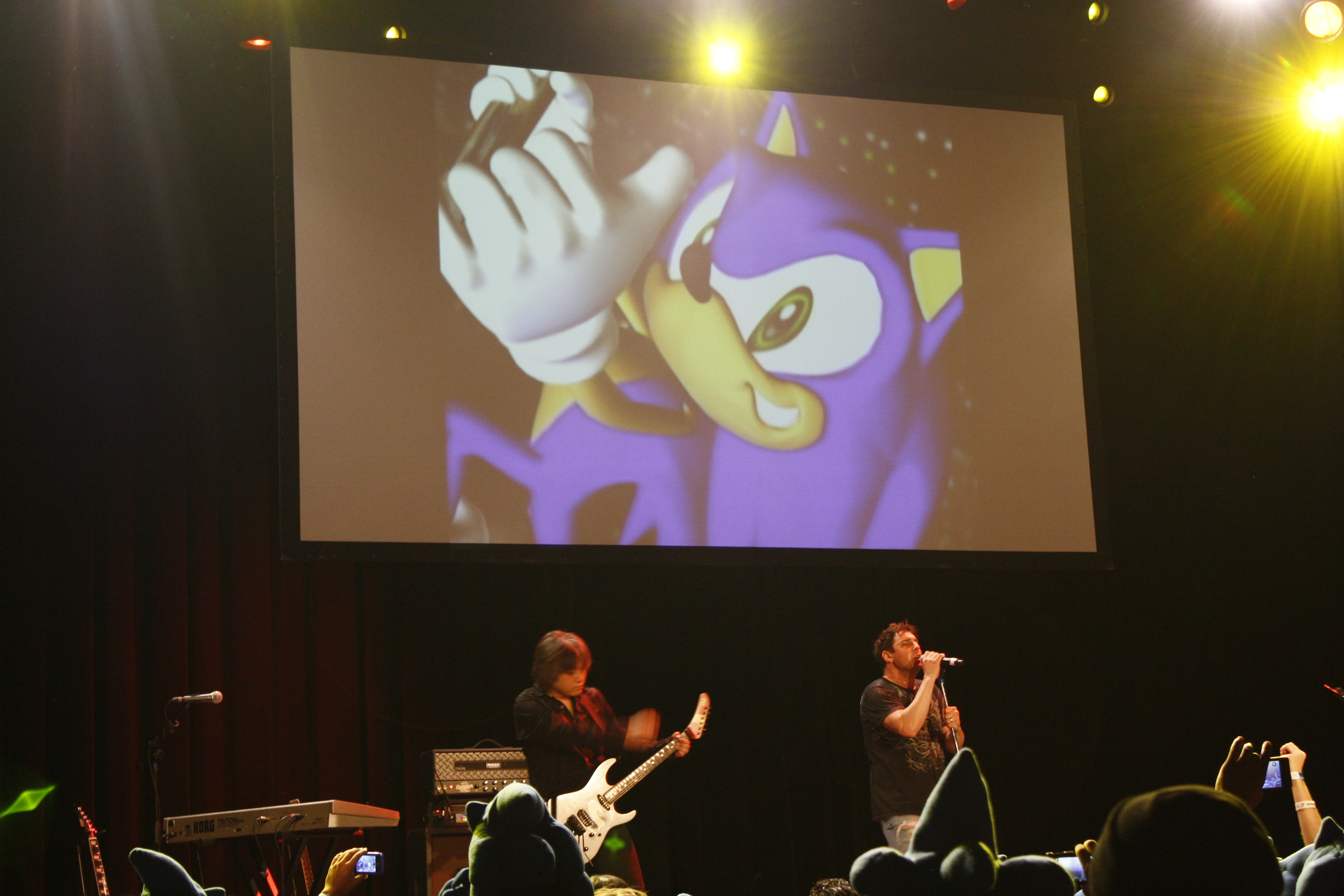
Jun Senoue (left) and his band Crush 40 have composed music for many Sonic games since Sonic the Hedgehog 3 (1994).

The music for Sega's Sonic the Hedgehog video game series and media franchise has been provided by a number of composers, ranging from Sega sound staff to independent contractors and popular bands. It covers a wide array of genres, including pop, funk, rock, metal, ska, punk, hip hop, R&B, jazz, electronica, trance, breakbeat, drum and bass, disco, ambient, world, orchestral, and lo-fi.

The Sonic franchise is known for its music. The technology website Tom's Guide wrote that it "has always had some of the best music in all of video gaming". Almost all Sonic games have received soundtrack album releases.

== History ==
=== Sonic the Hedgehog (1991) ===
"Green Hill Zone Theme"
A 24-second portion of the theme for Green Hill Zone, composed by Masato Nakamura. It is one of the most recognized video game tracks.

Sega director Fujio Minegishi had connections to the music industry, and suggested his friend Yūzō Kayama write the Sonic score. However, Sonic Team did not think Kayama's music would fit, and so commissioned Masato Nakamura, bassist and songwriter of the J-pop band Dreams Come True. Nakamura admitted he was surprised at the offer, as he had just founded the band, but accepted due to the team's aspirations of outperforming their rival Nintendo. Nakamura also stated that he was limited by the Genesis' hardware, with only four sounds being able to play concurrently, and lacking an understanding on composing music on computers.

Due to only having access to the concept art, he opted to treat the game like a film and convey the atmosphere depicted in the concept art. After composing the tracks, all songs were digitized on an Atari ST using the program Notator. The sound engine was programmed by Hiroshi Kubota and Yukifumi Makino; due to company policies at the time, both were credited as Jimita and Macky, although their names were added onto a hidden screen. Makino is also credited for composing the drowning and Chaos Emerald jingles.

Sonic the Hedgehog also saw an 8-bit version released on the Master System and Game Gear, developed by Ancient; Yuzo Koshiro, the company's founder, initially ported Nakamura's compositions to the 8-bit programmable sound generator (PSG) and sought to maintain the feel of the 16-bit tracks. However, only three of the converted tracks would be used while he would compose the rest of the soundtrack; among these unused conversions was an 8-bit rendition of the Marble Zone theme.

=== Sonic the Hedgehog 2 (1992) ===
Sega of America had initially wanted to use an in-house soundtrack, but it was rejected by the development staff who considered it "awful". Nakamura would end up returning for the sequel, having increased his asking price due to the success of the first game. Nakamura began working on the soundtrack before he had access to the game, so he based the music off the concept art he was given, using the same techniques as the first game. Due to being more technically advanced than his predecessor, Nakamura "wanted to create music that showed progress… It was like the Indiana Jones sequels. Same concept, but with more fun and excitement."

Nakamura was given free rein on the soundtrack by STI, including allowing for unusual rhythm patterns. The soundtrack to the second game was created on a Roland MC-4 Microcomposer, and converted to the Genesis by a team of five or six people. Nakamura was working on the soundtrack alongside the Dreams Come True album The Swinging Star, and as a gift to the developers, produced an alternate version of the ending theme titled "Sweet Sweet Sweet"; it released the same day as Sonic 2's worldwide release. The game's sound engine was programmed by Tomoyuki Shimada. The 8-bit version uses a completely different soundtrack — composed by Masafumi Ogata, Naofumi Hataya, and Tomonori Sawada — likely due to both STI and Aspect having little interaction during both version's development.

=== Sonic CD (1993) ===
Two soundtracks were composed for Sonic CD: the original score, featured in the Japanese and European releases, was composed by Naofumi Hataya and Masafumi Ogata, while the North American version was scored by Spencer Nilsen, David Young, and Mark Crew. The Japanese composers drew inspiration from club music such as house and techno, while Hataya cited C+C Music Factory, Frankie Knuckles, and the KLF as influences. According to Nilsen, Sega commissioned a new soundtrack for the American release as the marketing department felt it needed a "more musically rich and complex" soundtrack. Nilsen also wrote a theme song, "Sonic Boom", which became one of the franchise's most iconic tracks.

=== Sonic the Hedgehog 3 and Sonic & Knuckles (1994) ===
A number of composers contributed to the Sonic the Hedgehog 3 score, including Sega sound staff and independent contractors recruited to finish the game on schedule. American pop musician Michael Jackson, a Sonic fan, approached Sega, and he was hired to write tracks for Sonic 3. However, it is unclear if Jackson's contributions remain in the final game. According to Ohshima and Hector, Jackson's involvement was terminated and his music reworked following the first allegations of child sexual abuse against him, but composers Doug Grigsby, Cirocco Jones, and Brad Buxer said his contributions remained. Buxer, who was Jackson's musical director, recalled Jackson chose to go uncredited because he was unhappy with how his music sounded on the Genesis, and that the credits music became the basis for Jackson's 1996 single "Stranger in Moscow".

Buxer recalled in 2022 that of the 41 tracks the sound team composed, Jackson had only worked on one; the theme for IceCap Zone was also lifted from an unreleased track by The Jetzons called "Hard Times", for which Buxer was a keyboardist. During the release of The Complete Jetzons vinyl, a special "Sonic Blue" edition was printed which used IceCap Zone's background for its cover, referencing the reused melody. Sonic 3 would also be the first game Jun Senoue would compose for, before becoming the lead composer for several future entries.

The Windows port Sonic & Knuckles Collection (1997) uses different music tracks for several scenes, which were also later used in the remastered version in Sonic Origins (2022); the tracks were long speculated to have been hastily composed to replace Jackson's tracks due to copyright issues, however a prototype of the Genesis version released in 2019 has the Collection tracks, indicating they were made before Jackson's sound team joined. Upon Origin's release, Yuji Naka expressed surprise that Sega did not use Jackson's tracks, while critics and fans generally criticized the new conversions for feeling inconsistent with the rest of the soundtrack.

=== Other games ===
Senoue has composed the music for many Sonic games since Sonic The Hedgehog 3, (Note: Senoue was the lead composer for Sonic 3D Blast (1996), Sonic Adventure (1998), Sonic Adventure 2 (2001), Sonic Heroes (2003), Shadow the Hedgehog (2005), Sonic and the Black Knight (2009), Sonic the Hedgehog 4 (2010 and 2012), Sonic Generations (2011), and Team Sonic Racing (2019).) often with his band Crush 40, which he formed with Hardline vocalist Johnny Gioeli. While the Genesis Sonic soundtracks were characterized by electropop, Senoue's scores typically feature funk and rock music. Tomoya Ohtani has been the series' sound director since Sonic the Hedgehog in 2006, and was the lead composer for that game, Sonic Unleashed, Sonic Colors, Sonic Lost World, Sonic Runners, Sonic Forces and Sonic Frontiers. Ohtani, in an interview, stated that he attempts to "express through music the greatest features each game has", citing the diverse and energetic score of Sonic Unleashed and the more science fiction-style score of Sonic Colors as examples.

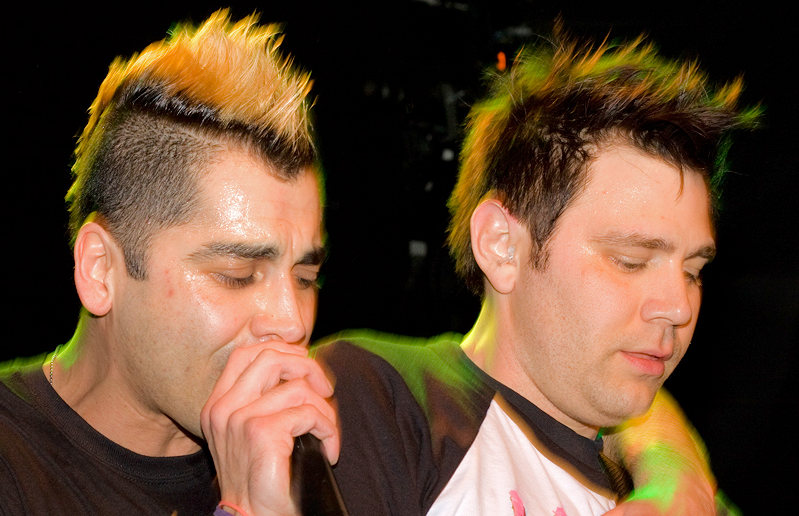
Ali Tabatabaee and Matty Lewis of Zebrahead performed the main theme of Sonic the Hedgehog (2006).

Other composers who have contributed to Sonic games include Richard Jacques and Hideki Naganuma. Tee Lopes — known for releasing unofficial remixes of Sonic tracks on YouTube — was the lead composer for Sonic Mania and a contributor to Team Sonic Racing. Sonic games have also featured contributions from notable artists. The main theme of the 2006 Sonic the Hedgehog, "His World" was performed by Ali Tabatabaee and Matty Lewis of the punk rock band Zebrahead, while R&B artist Akon remixed "Sweet Sweet Sweet" for its soundtrack. Doug Robb, lead-singer of post-grunge band Hoobastank performed the main theme of Sonic Forces, while metalcore band DangerKids performed the theme song for the game's antagonist, Infinite.

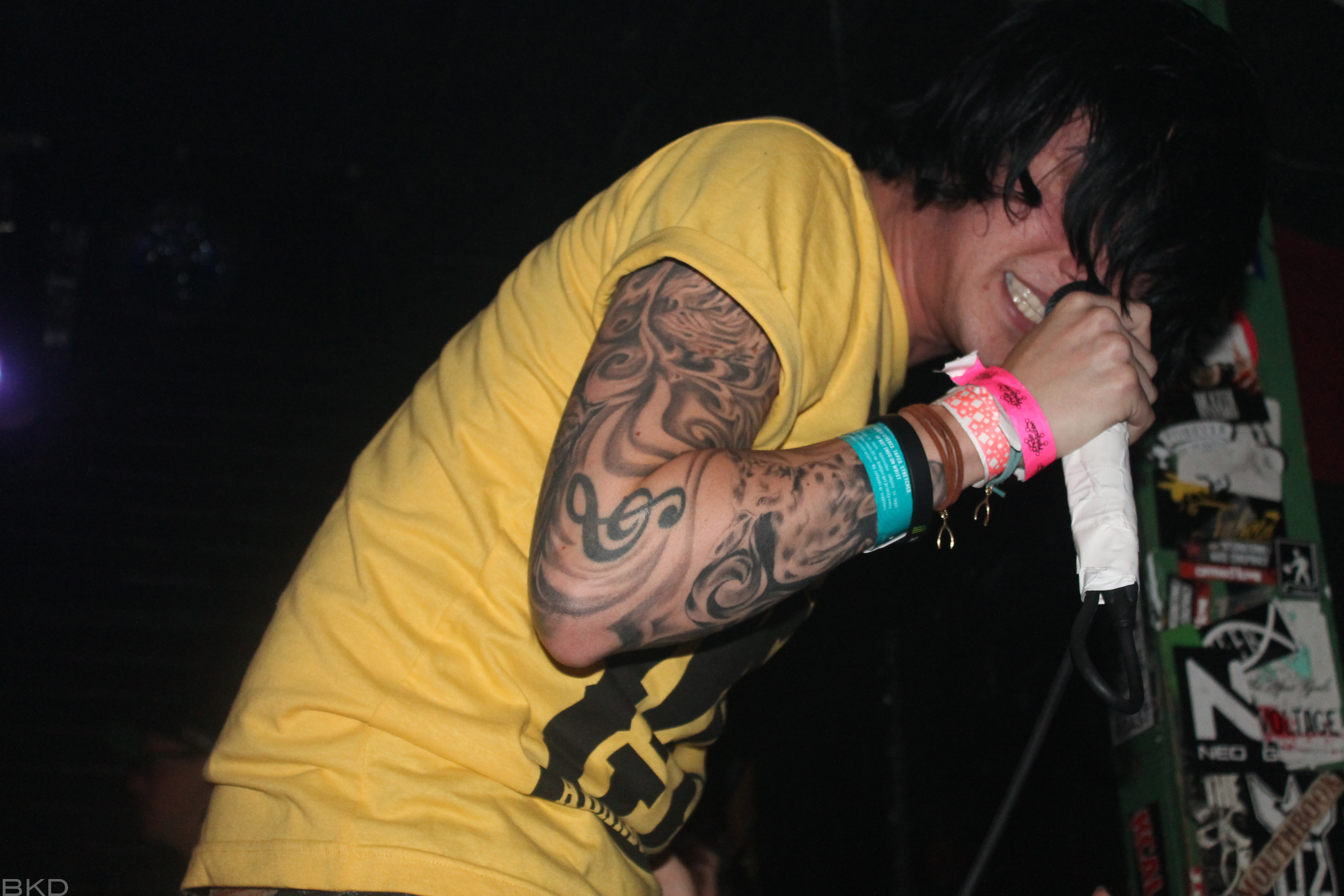
Kellin Quinn of Sleeping with Sirens featured in four songs for Sonic Frontiers (2022).

In September 2022, Sega revealed one of the three ending themes of the 2022 entry Sonic Frontiers titled "Vandalize", which was performed by the Japanese rock band One Ok Rock. A couple of days later, they also released the main theme of the game titled "I'm Here", featuring vocalist Merry Kirk-Holmes of the alternative metal band To Octavia. The vocalist and keyboardist of post-hardcore band Sleeping with Sirens, Kellin Quinn, also appeared on four songs in the same game, with one of them featuring DangerKids vocalist Tyler Smyth.

== Merchandise ==
In January 2017, Sega made various Sonic soundtracks available on the music streaming service Spotify.

=== Sonic the Hedgehog 1&2 Soundtrack ===
Sonic the Hedgehog 1&2 Soundtrack

Soundtrack album by Dreams Come True and Akon
- Released: October 19, 2011 (physical); November 21, 2012 (iTunes)
- Recorded: 1991–1992; 2006
- Genre: Video game soundtrack
- Length: Disc 1: 67:51; Disc 2: 65:15; Disc 3: 19:26
- Languages: English, Japanese
- Labels: DCT Records; Universal Music (distributor)

Sonic the Hedgehog 1&2 Soundtrack (Note: Japanese: ソニック・ザ・ヘッジホッグ 1&2 サウンドトラック, Hepburn: Sonikku za Hejjihoggu 1&2 Saundotorakku) is a soundtrack album for the first two 16-bit games released in Japan on October 19, 2011, as part of the franchise's 20th anniversary. The soundtrack is split among three discs, with the first disc being recordings of the tracks in-game, while the second disc contains the original demos Masato Nakamura had created prior to being converted to the Genesis' sound format. The unused track, often thought to be a theme for the scrapped Hidden Palace Zone, is listed as "STH2 Unused Song" on both discs, with the demo version including an ending rather than looping.

The third disc contains the vocal theme "Sweet Sweet Sweet", its English translation ("Sweet Dreams"), and remixes by musical artist Akon which were used in the 2006 video game (commonly referred to as Sonic '06). Also included with the soundtrack were comments by Masato Nakamura and programmer Yuji Naka, alongside artwork during the first game's development.

It was later made available on iTunes on November 21, 2012, on the 20th anniversary of Sonic 2's release in the region.

Disc 1 (Mega Drive version)
No.	Title	Length
1.	"STH1 Green Hill Zone"	2:38
2.	"STH1 Marble Zone"	2:08
3.	"STH1 Spring Yard Zone"	2:10
4.	"STH1 Labyrinth Zone"	2:08
5.	"STH1 Star Light Zone"	2:26
6.	"STH1 Scrap Brain Zone"	2:36
7.	"STH1 Final Zone"	1:17
8.	"STH1 Special Stage"	1:32
9.	"STH1 Power Up"	0:58
10.	"STH1 1up"	0:06
11.	"STH1 Title"	0:11
12.	"STH1 All Clear"	0:20
13.	"STH1 Stage Clear"	0:09
14.	"STH1 Boss"	1:23
15.	"STH1 Game Over"	0:15
16.	"STH1 Continue"	0:12
17.	"STH1 Staff Roll"	2:03
18.	"STH2 Emerald Hill Zone"	2:26
19.	"STH2 Chemical Plant Zone"	2:10
20.	"STH2 Aquatic Ruin Zone"	1:40
21.	"STH2 Casino Night Zone"	2:18
22.	"STH2 Hill Top Zone"	1:51
23.	"STH2 Mystic Cave Zone"	2:07
24.	"STH2 Oil Ocean Zone"	1:55
25.	"STH2 Metropolis Zone"	1:49
26.	"STH2 Mystic Cave Zone (2P)"	2:05
27.	"STH2 Casino Night Zone (2P)"	1:55
28.	"STH2 Death Egg Zone (Part1)"	2:10
29.	"STH2 Death Egg Zone (Part2)"	2:18
30.	"STH2 Emerald Hill Zone (2P)"	1:35
31.	"STH2 Sky Chase Zone"	1:38
32.	"STH2 Wing Fortress Zone"	1:59
33.	"STH2 Special Stage"	1:47
34.	"STH2 Power Up"	0:54
35.	"STH2 Title"	0:12
36.	"STH2 All Clear"	1:16
37.	"STH2 Boss"	2:14
38.	"STH2 Super Sonic"	1:16
39.	"STH2 Option"	0:42
40.	"STH2 Staff Roll"	2:41
41.	"STH2 Game Results"	2:19
42.	"STH2 Unused Song"	2:02
Total length:		67:51

Disc 2 (Masa's Demo version)
No.	Title	Length
1.	"STH1 Green Hill Zone"	2:37
2.	"STH1 Marble Zone"	2:14
3.	"STH1 Spring Yard Zone"	2:16
4.	"STH1 Labyrinth Zone"	2:08
5.	"STH1 Star Light Zone"	2:30
6.	"STH1 Scrap Brain Zone"	2:41
7.	"STH1 Final Zone"	1:24
8.	"STH1 Special Stage"	1:32
9.	"STH1 1up"	0:07
10.	"STH1 Title"	0:12
11.	"STH1 All Clear"	0:24
12.	"STH1 Stage Clear"	0:11
13.	"STH1 Boss"	1:29
14.	"STH1 Game Over"	0:22
15.	"STH1 Continue"	0:13
16.	"STH2 Emerald Hill Zone"	2:48
17.	"STH2 Chemical Plant Zone"	2:29
18.	"STH2 Aquatic Ruin Zone"	2:03
19.	"STH2 Casino Night Zone"	2:23
20.	"STH2 Hill Top Zone"	2:12
21.	"STH2 Mystic Cave Zone"	2:26
22.	"STH2 Oil Ocean Zone"	2:06
23.	"STH2 Metropolis Zone"	2:21
24.	"STH2 Mystic Cave Zone (2P)"	2:02
25.	"STH2 Casino Night Zone (2P)"	2:03
26.	"STH2 Death Egg Zone (Part1)"	2:18
27.	"STH2 Death Egg Zone (Part2)"	2:22
28.	"STH2 Emerald Hill Zone (2P)"	1:45
29.	"STH2 Sky Chase Zone"	1:49
30.	"STH2 Wing Fortress Zone"	2:08
31.	"STH2 Special Stage"	2:04
32.	"STH2 All Clear"	1:23
33.	"STH2 Boss"	2:26
34.	"STH2 Super Sonic"	1:21
35.	"STH2 Option"	0:40
36.	"STH2 Game Results"	2:19
37.	"STH2 Unused Song"	1:03
38.	"Theme of SONIC THE HEDGEHOG"	0:34
Total length:		65:15

Disc 3
No.	Title	Length
1.	"SWEET SWEET SWEET"	5:15
2.	"SWEET DREAM"	5:14
3.	"SWEET SWEET SWEET –06 AKON MIX–"	4:41
4.	"SWEET DREAM −06 AKON MIX–"	4:16
Total length:		19:25

== Reception and legacy ==
Many have described the melody of Green Hill Zone as instantly recognizable in pop culture, often being ranked among the greatest video game songs of all time. GamesRadar+ has noted that the song is still being continually remixed on YouTube years after release. During the franchise's 30th anniversary, Dreams Come True released a single based on Green Hill Zone's theme known as "Tsugi no Se~no! De – On The Green Hill – DCT version" on July 7, 2021, with the music video for it being released in September. An alternate version using Genesis instruments was released as "Masado & Miwasco Version". A remix of the Star Light Zone theme was used during the opening ceremony of the 2020 Summer Olympics in Tokyo, Japan, which Masato Nakamura expressed gratitude for.

On June 23, 2021, the Sonic Symphony concert tour, in which original arrangements of various Sonic the Hedgehog music are performed, started with the Sonic the Hedgehog 30th Anniversary Symphony. The concert featured performances by the Prague Philharmonic Orchestra, the Tomoya Ohtani Band, Crush 40, and Nathan Sharp and was presented as a free live stream on YouTube and Twitch. The tour would have its first live concert on October 12, 2022 at the 2022 Brasil Game Show and more live concerts in late 2023 and 2024 as Sonic Symphony World Tour.

Music from the first two games have also appeared in other entries, namely Sonic Adventure 2 (2001), Sonic Generations (2011), and Sonic Mania (2017). The melody for Emerald Hill Zone was also used during a promotion of the second film. Due to it being owned by Dreams Come True, however, there have been occasional legal issues with using or remixing the soundtrack; an example of this was Sonic Spinball (1993), which had new music hastily composed by Howard Drossin after the game had already been shipped with music from the first game, without licensing it. The theme used for Green Hills Zone in the second 8-bit game was later remixed as "Sonic – You Can Do Anything" for the Japanese and European versions of Sonic CD, sung by Keiko Utoku, while Bridge Zone's theme from the first game was also remixed into Tails' theme in Sonic Adventure.

== See also ==
- The soundtracks from the Sonic the Hedgehog film series:
  - Sonic the Hedgehog (soundtrack)
  - Sonic the Hedgehog 2 (soundtrack)
  - Knuckles (soundtrack)
  - Sonic the Hedgehog 3 (soundtrack)
- The music of Streets of Rage, another Sega series well known for its music
