= Live & Learn (Crush 40 song) =

Song by Crush 40

from the album Multi-dimensional Sonic Adventure 2 Original Sound Track
- Released: June 19, 2001
- Recorded: 2001
- Genre: Hard rock; video game music
- Length: 4:28
- Label: Wave Master Entertainment
- Composer: Jun Senoue
- Lyricist: Johnny Gioeli
- Producer: Jun Senoue

Crush 40 chronology
| Watch Me Fly... (2000) | Live & Learn (2001) | Sonic Heroes (2003) |

Audio sample
- A sample of the chorus of "Live & Learn".: file; help

Licensed audio
- "Live & Learn" on YouTube

"Live & Learn" is the theme song to the 2001 Dreamcast video game Sonic Adventure 2. It was performed by Japanese-American hard rock band Crush 40, with Jun Senoue composing it and Johnny Gioeli writing the lyrics. The song is used throughout the game, with its most well-known sequence being during the game's final boss battle. "Live & Learn" is notable for helping Crush 40 gain popularity among the Sonic community, as well as being one of the most memorable and beloved tracks in the franchise during the 2000s.

== Background and production ==
"Live & Learn" was recorded for Sonic Adventure 2. During its development, Senoue and Gioeli reunited to record the title track. Takeshi Taneda and Katsuji Kirita—from Gargoyle and the Cro-Magnons—were brought in to play the bass and drums respectively, while Shibata and Homma were busy performing with Loudness and later Anthem.

Senoue recorded the intro to the song, in Los Angeles, for the game's trial edition; he later worked on the rest of the arrangement and completed it within a single day. He then sent a demo to Gioeli to record his vocals. Gioeli was given the task of writing the lyrics for "Live & Learn".

== Composition and lyrics ==
"Live & Learn" is set in the key of C# minor, with a tempo of 172 beats per minute. It was composed with guitar riffs and drum beats Gioeli's vocal delivery accompanies the instrumentation.

According to Gioeli, the idea for the song's lyrics came from imagining someone navigating through the game, getting crushed, and learning and getting past and living.

== Critical reception ==
"Live & Learn" has become one of the most memorable songs on the soundtrack for Sonic Adventure 2, according to Sean Aitchison of Fanbyte, and remains a popular Sonic song amongst fans. Chris Greening of Video Game Music Online praised the hard rock sound, as well as Gioeli's vocal delivery, stating that the song is "an ecstatic Americana rock anthem featuring Johnny at his best". Gioeli was initially nervous and asked Senoue if his lyrics for "Live & Learn" were okay on multiple occasions, but has over time become one of his favorite songs, according to Vice.

== Live performances ==
Crush 40 debuted "Live & Learn" live in their first live performance at the 2008 Tokyo Game Show. The song is a staple of Crush 40's live sets, with notable performances including the 2010 Summer of Sonic fan convention, at LIVE in Tokyo in 2011, and at Joypolis in Tokyo, Japan in 2015.

In 2021, Crush 40 performed the song with a new symphonic arrangement with the Prague Philharmonic Orchestra as the finale of the Sonic 30th Anniversary Symphony. Later in 2023, Gioeli and Senoue reunited to perform it live with the Sonic Symphony band in Los Angeles. Gioeli later performed live at the 2025 TooManyGames game convention at the Greater Philadelphia Expo Center, in Pennsylvania.

== Versions and remixes ==
=== Remastered version ===
In 2008, "Live & Learn" has received a remastered version by Masahiro Fukuhara, labeled as the "2007 Mix", for the True Blue: The Best of Sonic the Hedgehog studio album.

=== Acoustic version ===
The song was reimagined as an acoustic version in 2022 by Crush 40, with most of the instrumentation and vocals re-recorded and arrangements for new instruments introduced. The version is featured in the Rock 'n' Sonic The Hedgehog: Sessions studio album.

== Legacy and media usage ==
"Live & Learn" has appeared in numerous games, including non-Sonic titles such as the Maimai, Phantasy Star, Super Smash Bros., and Yakuza series.

In the original Japanese version of Sonic X, "Live & Learn" appeared as an insert song in episode 38, where Super Sonic and Super Shadow both perform Chaos Control to teleport the ARK back to orbit.

An instrumental remix of the song briefly plays after the "I Am... All of Me" portion in the track "Event : Super Shadow" in the 2005 video game Shadow the Hedgehog, where the eponymous character transforms into their super transformation.

In 2011, as a pre-order bonus for the PlayStation Portable video game Hatsune Miku: Project Diva Extend, Sega sent bonus CD albums—named "Special Collaboration Album VOCALOID extend REMIXIES"—that contains seven tracks, including a cover version of "Live & Learn" sung by Hatsune Miku, which was manipulated by Otomania.

In the 2024 film Sonic the Hedgehog 3, "Live & Learn" is heavily featured throughout its musical score. The film's director, Jeff Fowler, considers the song and Crush 40 as inseparable elements from Sonic Adventure 2, thus they "knew it had to be there".

== Ownership dispute ==
In December 2024, lead vocalist of Crush 40 Johnny Gioeli contended that while Sega owns the lyrics for "Live & Learn", Gioeli himself owns the master recording for it. He sued the company for unpaid royalties for the song's usage in numerous games and media, and claimed that they owe him $1 million in restitution and damages.

On August 28, 2025, the lawsuit was dismissed with prejudice in favor of Sega. On September 22, 2025, Gioeli publicly revealed the outcome on social media, and stated that the ownership status remains in "limbo".

On January 16, 2026, after the song was remixed in a promotional video by Sega, Gioeli revealed that "Live & Learn" is no longer in limbo, implying that the matter has been settled.

== Track listings and formats ==
- Multi-dimensional Sonic Adventure 2 Original Sound Track
1. "SA2 ...Main Riff for "Sonic Adventure 2"" (Album Version) – 0:22
2. "Advertise: SA2 ...in the groove" – 2:09
3. "Advertise: SA2 ver.B" – 0:28
4. "Advertise: SA2 ver.C" – 0:27
5. "Live & Learn ...Main Theme of "SONIC ADVENTURE 2"" – 4:28
- Sonic Adventure 2 Official Soundtrack
1. "Live & Learn ...Main Theme of Sonic Adventure 2" – 4:32
- Cuts Unleashed: SA2 Vocal Collection
1. "LIVE & LEARN ...main theme of "SONIC ADVENTURE 2"" – 4:32
2. "LIVE & LEARN ...main theme of "SONIC ADVENTURE 2" (Instrumental) – 4:32
- Crush 40
1. "Live & Learn" – 4:28
- The Best of Crush 40: Super Sonic Songs
1. "Live & Learn" – 4:31
- Sonic Adventure 2 Original Soundtrack 20th Anniversary Edition
1. "Live & Learn ...Main Theme of "Sonic Adventure 2"" – 4:33
- Blue Blur: Sonic Generations Original Soundtrack
1. "Rival Battle: Shadow the Hedgehog – Sonic Attack 'Live & Learn (Short ver.)'" – 0:48
- LIVE!
1. "Live & Learn" (Live) – 5:00
- SONIC ADVENTURE 2 OFFICIAL SOUNDTRACK VINYL EDITION
1. " SA2 ...Main Riff for "Sonic Adventure 2"" – 0:22
- Sonic 30th Anniversary Symphony
1. "Live & Learn – Live" – 4:50
- Rock 'n' Sonic The Hedgehog: Sessions
1. "Live & Learn – Acoustic Version – Live" – 5:21
- Sonic the Hedgehog 3: Music from the Motion Picture
1. "Live And Learn (Junkie XL Version)" – 0:49
