= Dolby Theatre =

Live-entertainment auditorium in Los Angeles, California

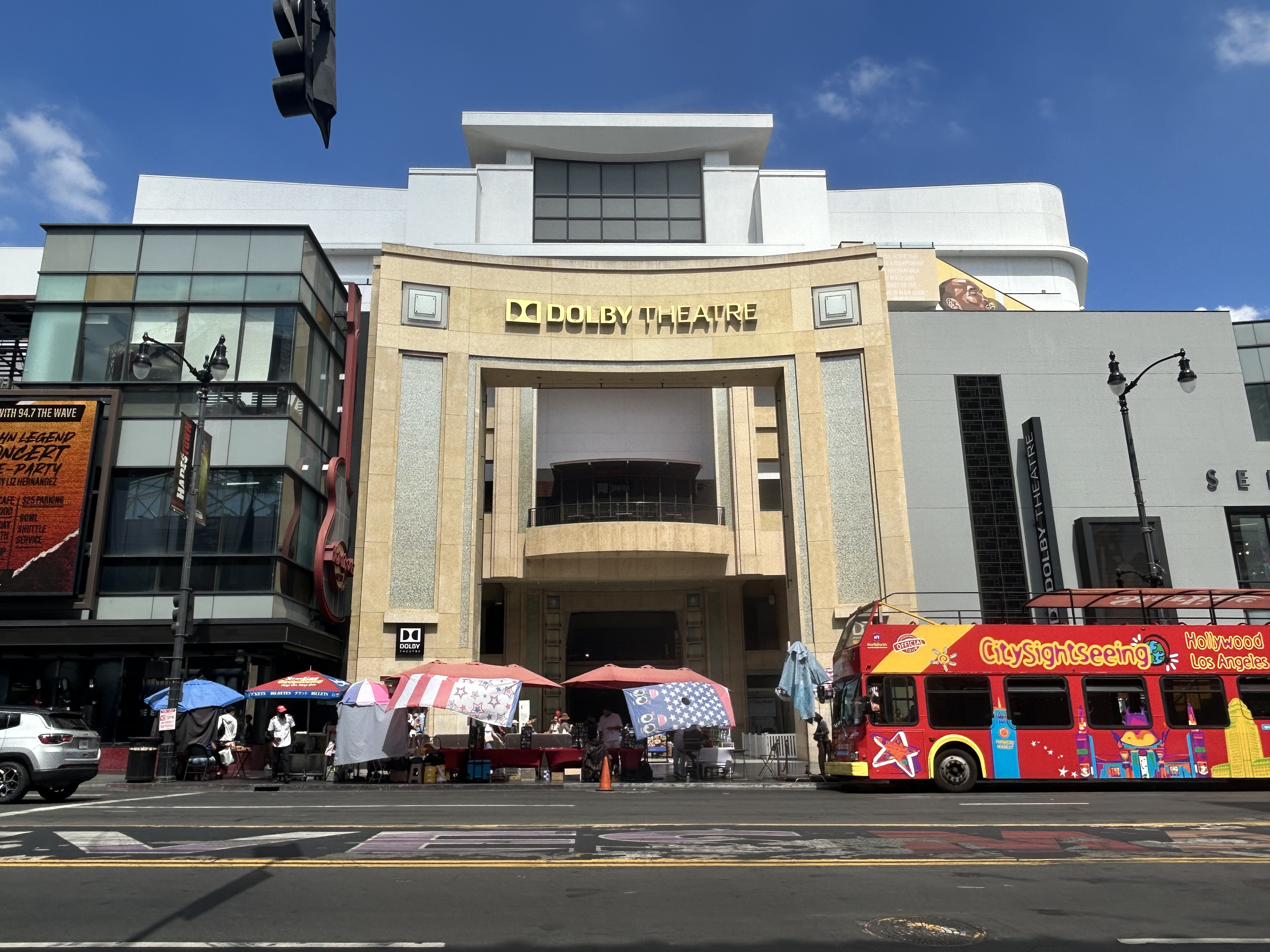
- The front facade of the Dolby Theatre at Ovation Hollywood in September 2025, the actual theatre is at the rear of the complex
- Interactive map of Dolby Theatre
- Former names: Kodak Theatre (2001–2012)
- Location: 6801 Hollywood Boulevard; Hollywood, California; 90028
- Coordinates: 34°06′10″N 118°20′25″W
- Owner: Canyon Partners
- Seating type: Reserved
- Capacity: 3,400
- Type: Indoor theatre
- Public transit: Hollywood/Highland

Construction
- Groundbreaking: 1997
- Built: 2001
- Opened: November 9, 2001; 24 years ago
- Cost: $94 million
- General contractor: McCarthy Building Companies

Website
- dolbytheatre.com

The Dolby Theatre (formerly known as the Kodak Theatre) is a live-performance auditorium in the Ovation Hollywood shopping mall and entertainment complex, on Hollywood Boulevard and Highland Avenue, in the Hollywood neighborhood of Los Angeles, California, United States. Since its opening on November 9, 2001, it has been the venue of the annual Academy Awards ceremony. It is adjacent to the TCL Chinese Theatre and opposite the El Capitan Theatre on Hollywood Boulevard.

Besides the Academy Awards, the venue has hosted other concerts and theatrical performances.

== Architecture ==
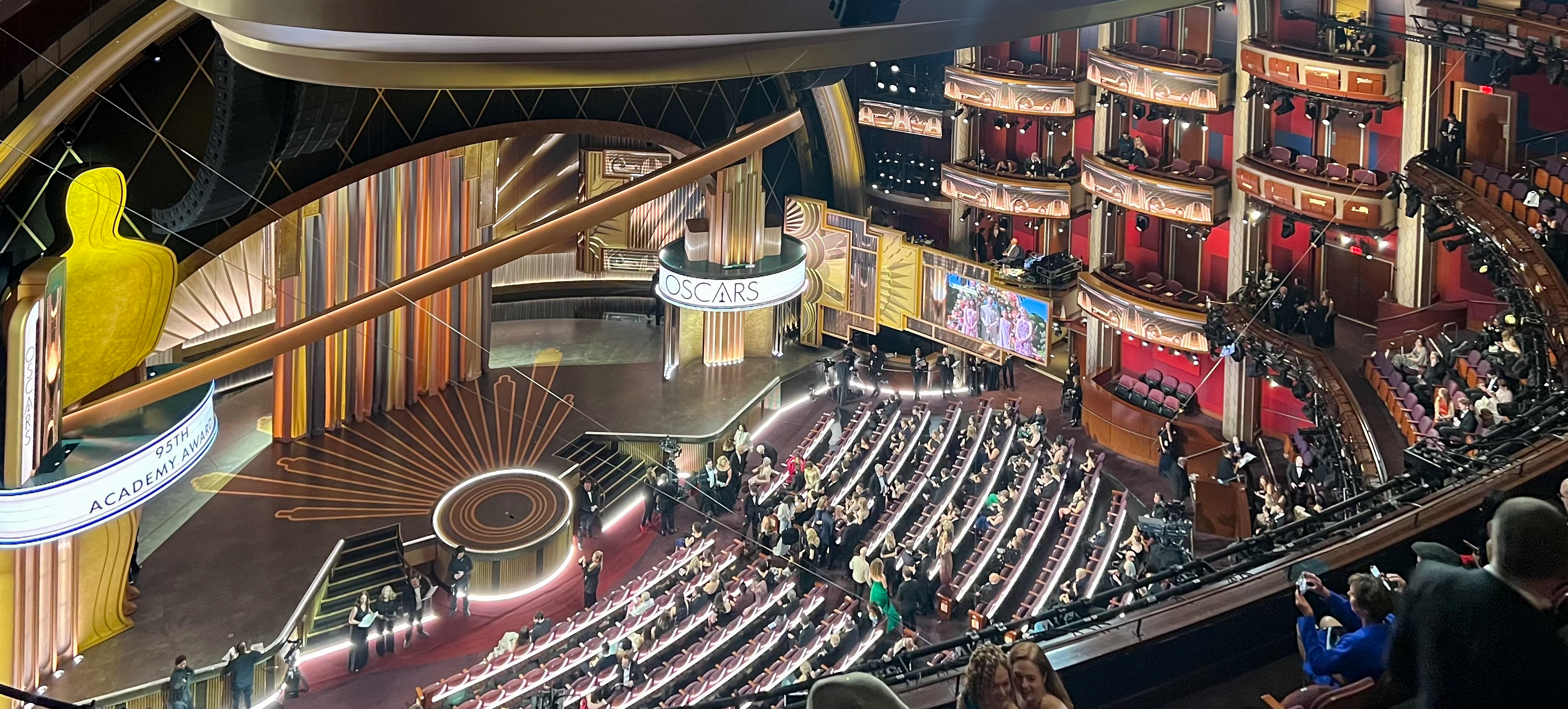
The interior of the theater hall in March 2023 during the 95th Academy Awards

The theater was designed by David Rockwell of the Rockwell Group specifically with the Oscar ceremonies in mind. Although the stage is one of the largest in the United States, roughly tied with the Elliott Hall of Music at Purdue University, measuring 113 feet (34 m) wide and 60 feet (18 m) deep, its seating capacity is only about half that of the Hall of Music, accommodating 3,332 people.

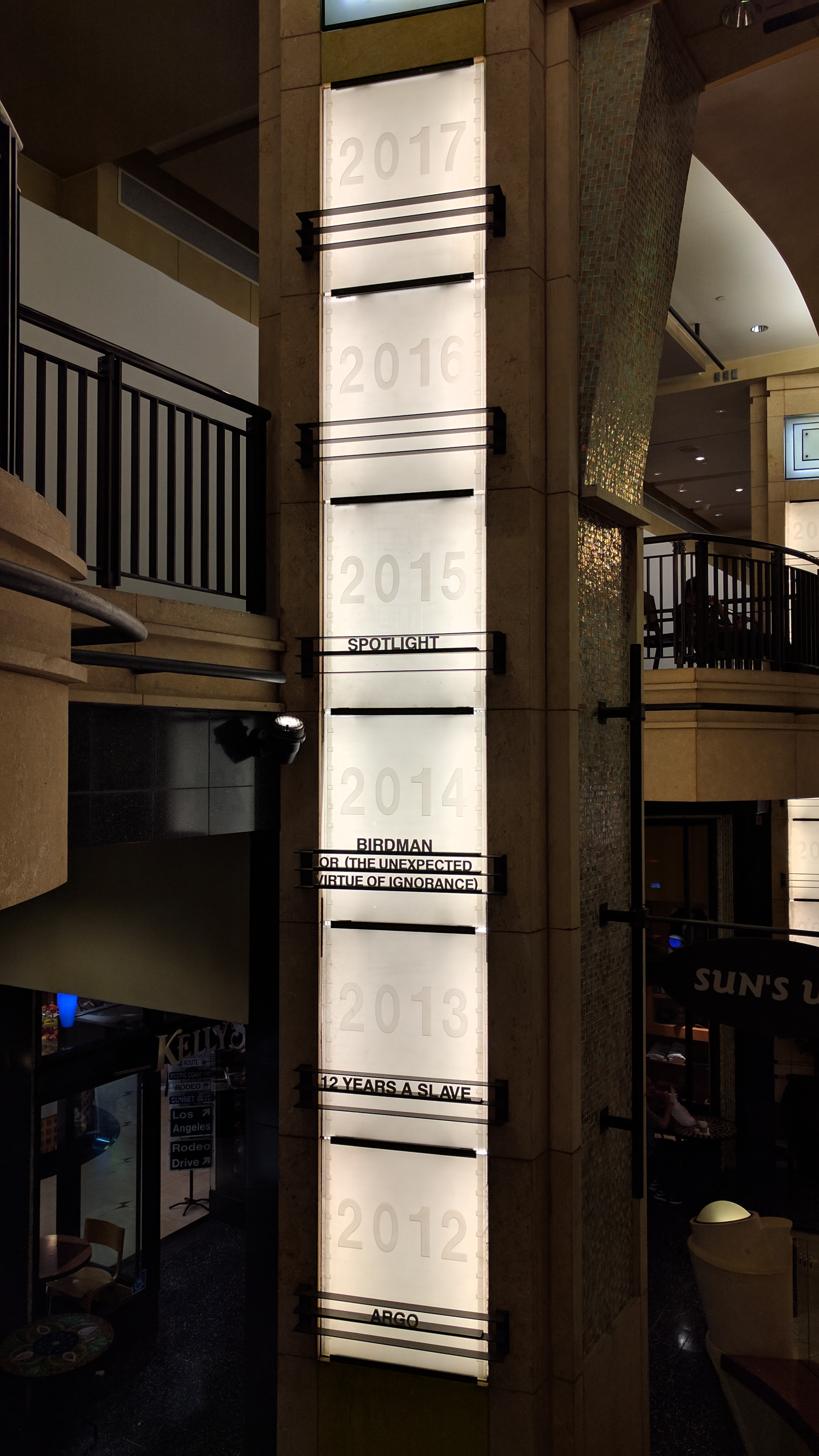
A 2016 photo of the Art Deco column displaying the 2012 to 2015 recipients of the Academy Award for Best Picture at the bottom, and blank spaces at the top for the then-yet-to-be-determined 2016 and 2017 winners

The auditorium has become known as a venue for televised events and performances (including American Idol and the Academy Awards). The architectural team consulted extensively with leading production personnel in Hollywood, achieving a highly functional cable infrastructure, with an underground cable bunker that crosses under the theater to truck locations on adjacent streets. Power is also substantial and accessible. The theater has a unique Rockwell-designed cockpit in the orchestra seating area for camera, sound, and stage management.

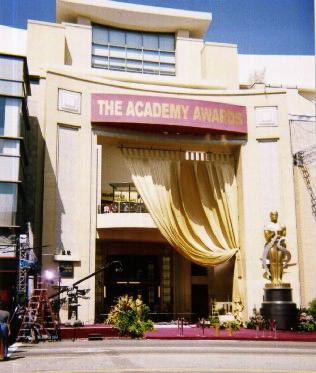
The entrance in March 2003 was decorated with 75th Academy Awards

The hall from the front entrance to the grand stairway (leading up to the theater at the rear of the shopping complex) is flanked by storefronts, as well as Art Deco columns displaying the names of films that have won the Academy Award for Best Picture (with blank spaces left for future Best Picture winners, currently set up to 2071). In a fashion reminiscent of Hollywood filmmaking, the building is dressed before the Academy Awards ceremony, sometimes with a different sign on its façade, red drapery to hide its storefronts, and the red carpet running up its grand staircase.

== History ==
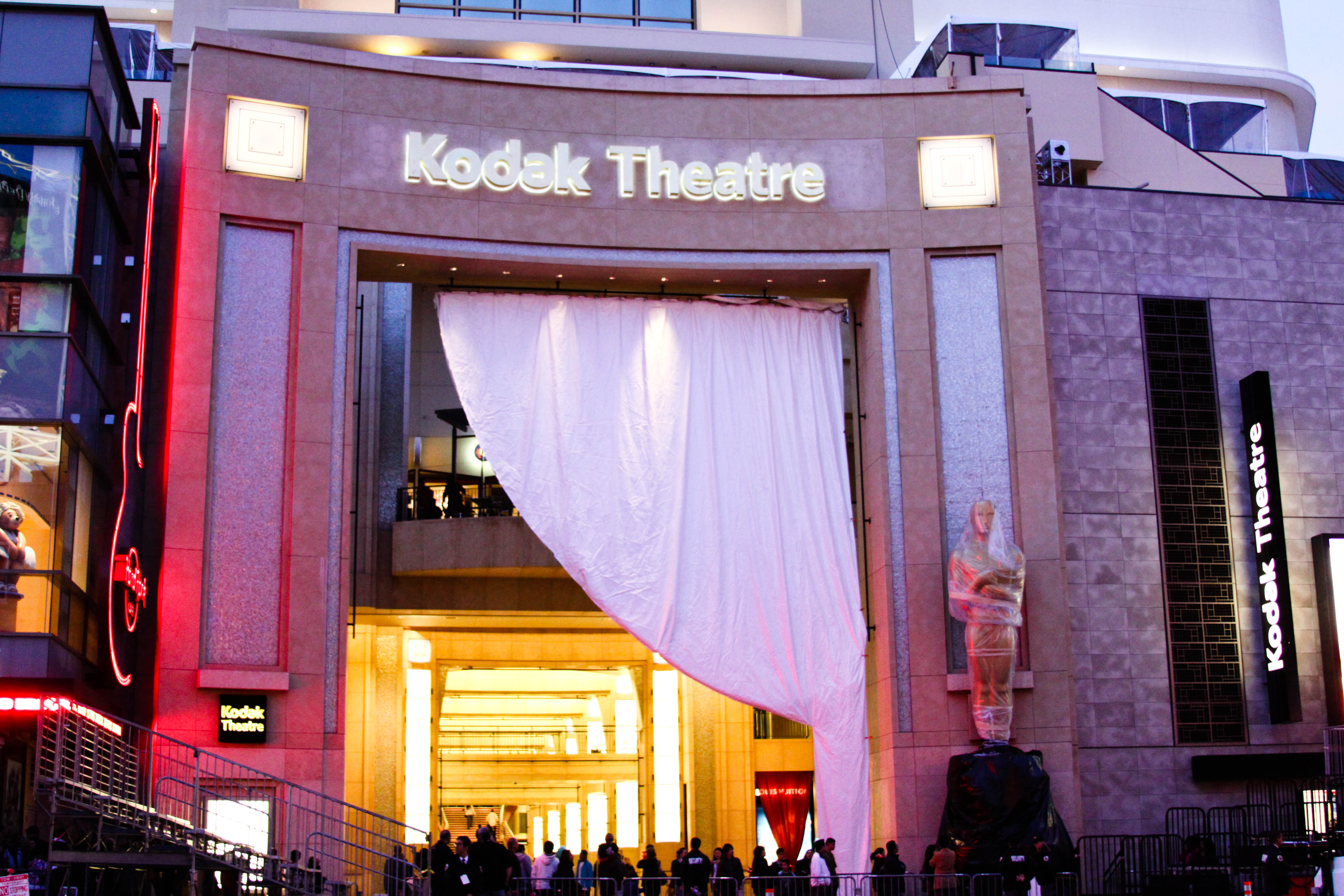
The facade of the Kodak Theater in February 2010 after 82nd Academy Awards

The theater was developed by TrizecHahn (later Trizec Properties), in partnership with the Academy of Motion Picture Arts and Sciences (AMPAS), aiming to overcome logistical issues met during previous Academy Awards that were hosted at other venues, such as the Dorothy Chandler Pavilion and Shrine Auditorium. In August 1997, AMPAS and Canadian development firm TrizecHahn began negotiations for the development of the Hollywood & Highland entertainment complex located on the corner of Hollywood Boulevard and Highland Avenue, adjacent to the Mann's Chinese Theatre. Seven months later, both the Academy and TrizecHahn agreed on a 20-year lease that allowed for the ceremony to be held at the new venue.

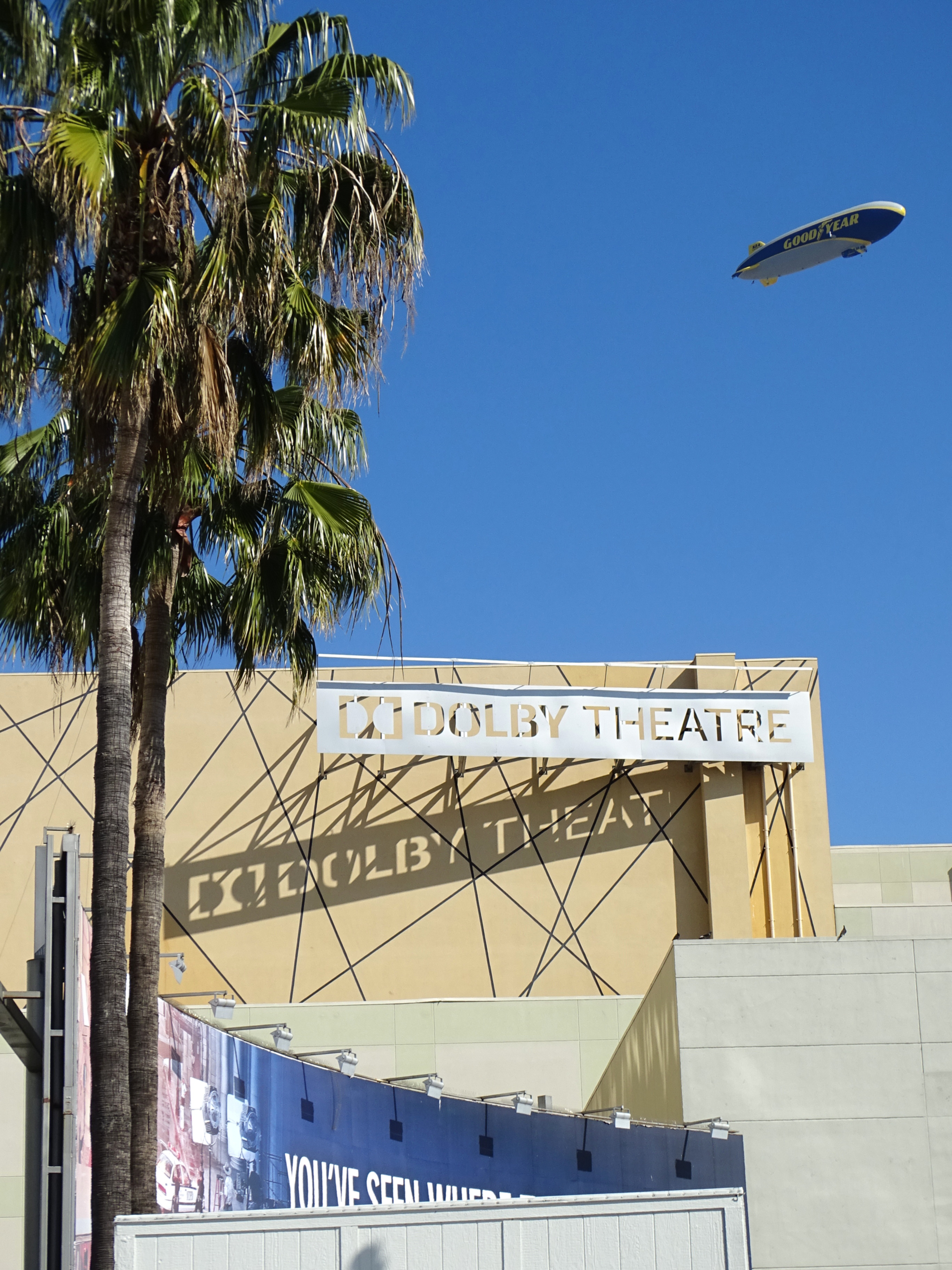
The theater building in February 2019

The Academy Awards were first hosted at the theater for its 74th ceremony, in 2002, marking the first time it was held in Hollywood since the 32nd ceremony at the Pantages Theatre in 1960. The complex was acquired, in February 2004, by CIM Group, and remained the venue for all Academy Awards ceremonies held for over two decades, with the exception of the 93rd Academy Awards in 2021, which were downsized and moved to Union Station due to the COVID-19 pandemic in California. In 2026, it was announced that the ceremony would move to the Peacock Theater starting in 2029.

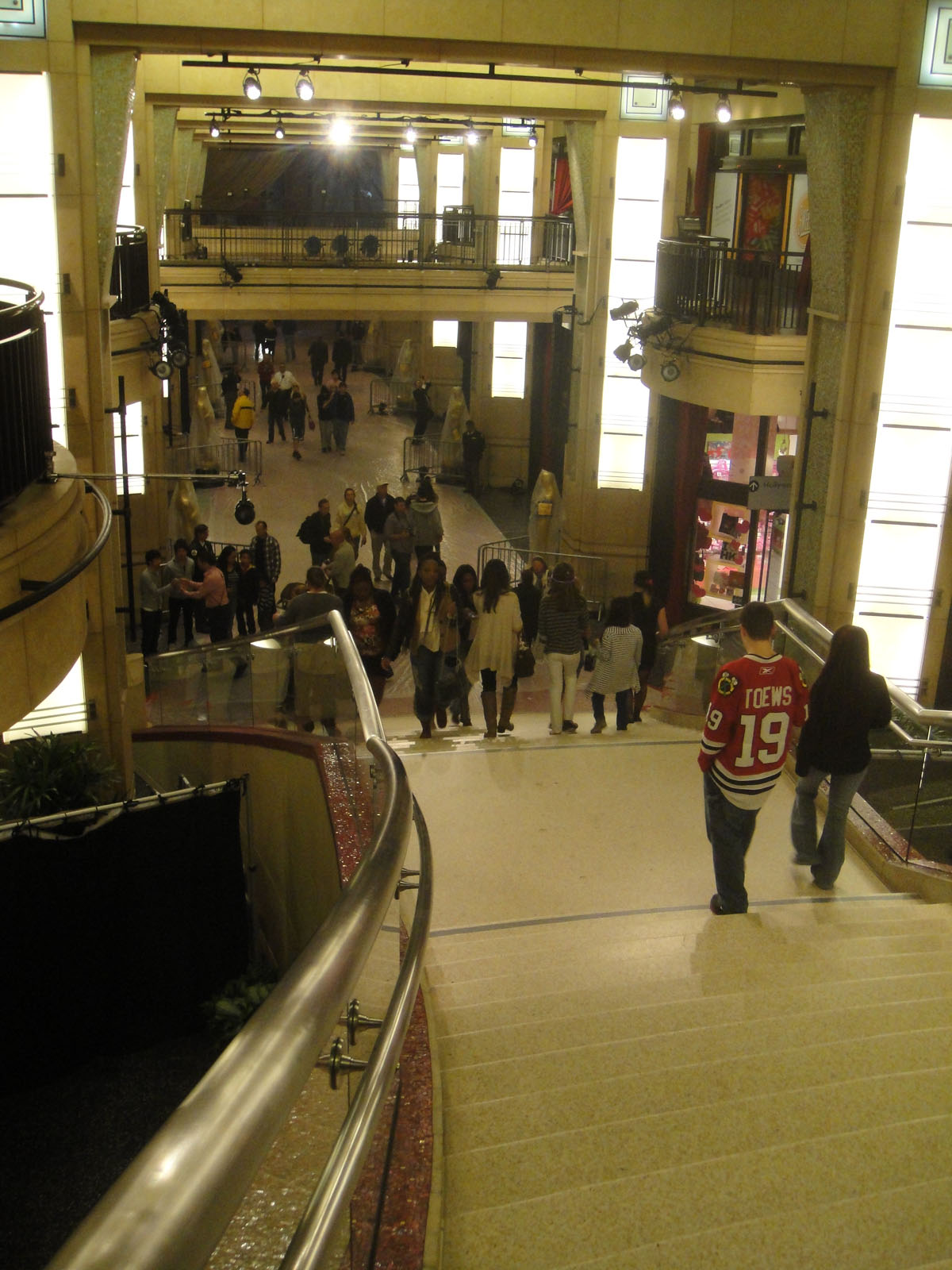
The Grand Staircase leading up to the Dolby Theatre

The theater was sponsored, until February 2012, by the Eastman Kodak Company, which paid $75 million for naming rights to the building. In early 2012, Eastman Kodak filed for bankruptcy protection, thus ending its naming-rights deal. The theater was temporarily renamed to the Hollywood and Highland Center at the suggestion of the venue's landlord.

On May 1, 2012, it was announced that the venue would be renamed the Dolby Theatre, after Dolby Laboratories signed a 20-year naming rights deal. Dolby updated the sound system first by installing Dolby Atmos. The company plans to continue updating the auditorium with newer technologies as they become available.

In October 2024, the theater was sold by the California Public Employees' Retirement System (CalPERS) to Jebs Hollywood Entertainment.

== Other events ==
Besides the Academy Awards, the theatre has hosted other award presentations. The American Film Institute has held its Life Achievement Award gala at the theatre. It hosted the 3rd Annual Latin Grammy Awards in 2002.

The venue hosted Miss USA 2004 and Miss USA 2007.

From September 2011 until early 2013, the venue hosted Iris, a Cirque du Soleil residency show inspired by the history of cinema. Significant changes were made to the theater to accommodate the show, including adding lifts deep under the original floor. On November 29, 2012, it was announced that Iris would close on January 19, 2013, after only two seasons, due to lack of profit.

The reality music competition series American Idol hosted its season finales from the Dolby Theatre during its original run on Fox from 2002, 2004 to 2007, and 2015 to 2016. From 2016 to 2019 and 2021, the theatre hosted the live shows of the NBC reality competition series America's Got Talent.

The Sonic Symphony held a concert at the Dolby Theatre on September 30, 2023, featuring Johnny Gioeli and Jun Senoue of Crush 40.

The venue hosted the MAMA Awards on November 21, 2024.

Wicked: One Wonderful Night was filmed at the Dolby Theatre on September 24, 2025, with the special broadcast on NBC on November 6, 2025.

The venue hosted the Summer Game Fest from June 5 to 8, 2026.

== See also ==
- List of music venues in the United States
- L.A. Live

== Bibliography ==
- Pond, Steve (2005). The Big Show: High Times and Dirty Dealings Backstage at the Academy Awards. New York: Faber and Faber. ISBN 0-571-21193-3.
