= Furiosa: A Mad Max Saga (soundtrack) =

Furiosa: A Mad Max Saga (Original Motion Picture Soundtrack)

Film score by Tom Holkenborg
- Released: 17 May 2024
- Recorded: 2023–2024
- Genre: Film score
- Length: 70:35
- Label: WaterTower Music
- Producer: Tom Holkenborg

Tom Holkenborg chronology
Rebel Moon – Part Two: The Scargiver (2024)	Furiosa: A Mad Max Saga (2024)	Sonic the Hedgehog 3 (2024)

Furiosa: A Mad Max Saga (Original Motion Picture Soundtrack) is the soundtrack to the 2024 film Furiosa: A Mad Max Saga directed by George Miller, which is a prequel to Mad Max: Fury Road (2015). The film's original score is composed by Tom Holkenborg and released through WaterTower Music on 17 May 2024.

== Development ==
Fury Road composer Tom Holkenborg returned to score Furiosa in February 2021, and eventually started working on it in May 2022. The film was scored from Furiosa's perspective, where "everything in the storytelling, the acting, the music is through her eyes, how she experiences the world [...] [Miller] wanted a score that was felt, rather than heard." Holkenborg, besides composing the film score, also recorded and mixed it with sound designer and engineer Robert Mackenzie. The sound design consisted of human voices, sound design and silence, along with the sounds of the vehicles, being integral to the storytelling.

Specific instruments used for the score were duduks and didgeridoos without distortions, as Holkenborg felt that they are "ancient and earthy in character"; the primary instrument being an early-1960 model Buchla 200 modular synthesizer used as the main sound for Dementus and the War Gods. Unlike Fury Road, where he used strings and horns, Holkenborg did not use those instruments in the prequel. But he curated sounds from re-purposed make-shift sources like in the predecessor, where metal sounds are endlessly pounded.

One of the sequences, where a young Furiosa being kidnapped by one of Dementus' raiders, had been described by Holkenborg as the hardest to compose and took them a day for scoring that specific sequence, as the sound design is "really trippy" and they had to get the detailing right. Holkenborg wanted to tweak the sonic distortions so that it would become the "heartbeat" of the score. Another important thing in the sound design is silence, where the stretches with and without a musical score makes up for the musical catharsis. As the music starts way slower and elemental when Furiosa becomes stronger, the music also had to reflect the energy of the character.

The first track from the score "Dementus Is Gaining" (14th track in the album) released as a single on May 3, 2024. WaterTower Music released the complete score on May 17, a week ahead of the film's release.

== Reception ==
Critical reviews from David Rooney of The Hollywood Reporter describing it as "thunderous" and Screen International critic Nikki Baughan called it as "propulsive" and "bone-shaking". Robert Daniels of RogerEbert.com wrote "Tom Holkenborg's deafeningly propulsive score, wholly immerses you in way that isn't needlessly showing".

However, music critics gave negative reviews to the score. Zanobard Reviews assigned a score of 4.5 (out of 10), saying "Tom Holkenborg's score for Furiosa: A Mad Max Saga sadly pales in comparison to its Fury Road predecessor; where the original had powerful moments of thunderous heroism and emotional poignancy this album simply has none, resulting in an unrelentingly chaotic percussion-heavy soundtrack with none of the payoffs that made the first worth a listen." Filmtracks.com gave a negative review, saying "it's the mass of oppressively obnoxious, overly processed action droning that defines the score for Furiosa: A Mad Max Saga, and it's a considerable wasted opportunity to build upon or foreshadow the prior score."

== Track listing ==
No.	Title	Length
1.	"The Pole of Inaccessibility"	1:59
2.	"Dementus"	2:52
3.	"The Promise"	3:42
4.	"You Are Awaited"	5:20
5.	"The Bear"	2:13
6.	"You're Scum"	4:16
7.	"Wives' Quarters"	4:00
8.	"The Wig and The Seed"	2:57
9.	"The Stowaway"	8:42
10.	"Fata Morgana"	1:17
11.	"Gastown"	3:18
12.	"A Noble Cause"	4:37
13.	"The Bullet Farm"	6:55
14.	"Dementus Is Gaining"	4:38
15.	"Dementus' Diatribe"	4:21
16.	"At the Dawn of War"	2:33
17.	"The Darkest of Gods"	5:27
18.	"Epilogue"	1:28
Total length:		70:35
