= Sonic Symphony =

Concert tour

- Tour by Sega
- Key art of Sonic Symphony World Tour
- Location: Online; South America; Europe; North America; Asia
- Associated album: Sonic 30th Anniversary Symphony
- Start date: June 23, 2021
- End date: January 11, 2025
- Legs: 3
- No. of shows: 44
- Website: www.sonicsymphonytour.com

Sega concert chronology
- Sonic Symphony (2020–2025); Sonic Live in Concert (2026–2027)

Sonic Symphony was a concert tour featuring original arrangements of the music of the Sonic the Hedgehog video game series by Sega performed by an orchestra and rock band. A concert also displays footage of gameplay from the series synchronized to the music. The first concert, Sonic the Hedgehog 30th Anniversary Symphony, was presented as a free live stream on YouTube and Twitch on June 23, 2021 to commemorate Sonic the Hedgehog's 30th anniversary. The second and first live concert was presented on October 12, 2022 at the 2022 Brasil Game Show. A live tour, Sonic Symphony World Tour, started on September 16, 2023 in London, England and ended on January 11, 2025 in Washington D.C., United States.

The successor concert tour, Sonic Live in Concert, started on September 20th, 2026 in Spokane, Washington and will continue through 2026 and 2027 in the United States, United Kingdom, and Canada.

== History ==
The Sonic the Hedgehog 30th Anniversary Symphony was announced in the Sonic Central presentation on May 27, 2021. The concert starred the Prague Philharmonic Orchestra performing orchestral arrangements and the Tomoya Ohtani Band and Crush 40 performing pop rock arrangements, with Nathan Sharp as the guest singer. The fan-made Chao Camera mod for Sonic Adventure 2 was used for gameplay footage. The Sonic the Hedgehog 30th Anniversary Symphony was also featured in the 2021 Summer Game Fest. The concert took two years to plan and switched to being shown as a free live stream due to the COVID-19 pandemic. An album of its music was released on September 18, 2021 on the iTunes Store and Apple Music and on other major digital music services four days later.

The concert at the 2022 Brasil Game Show was announced in the Sonic Central presentation on June 7, 2022 with more tour dates to come.

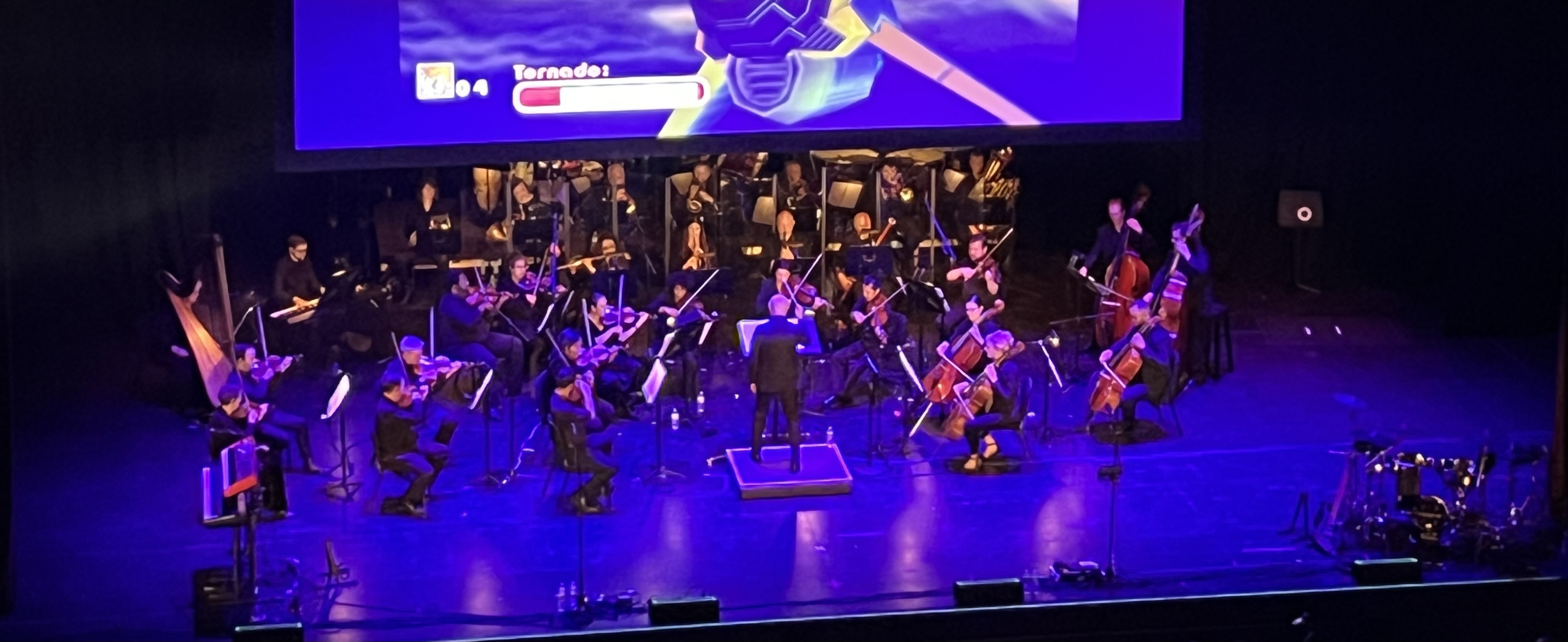
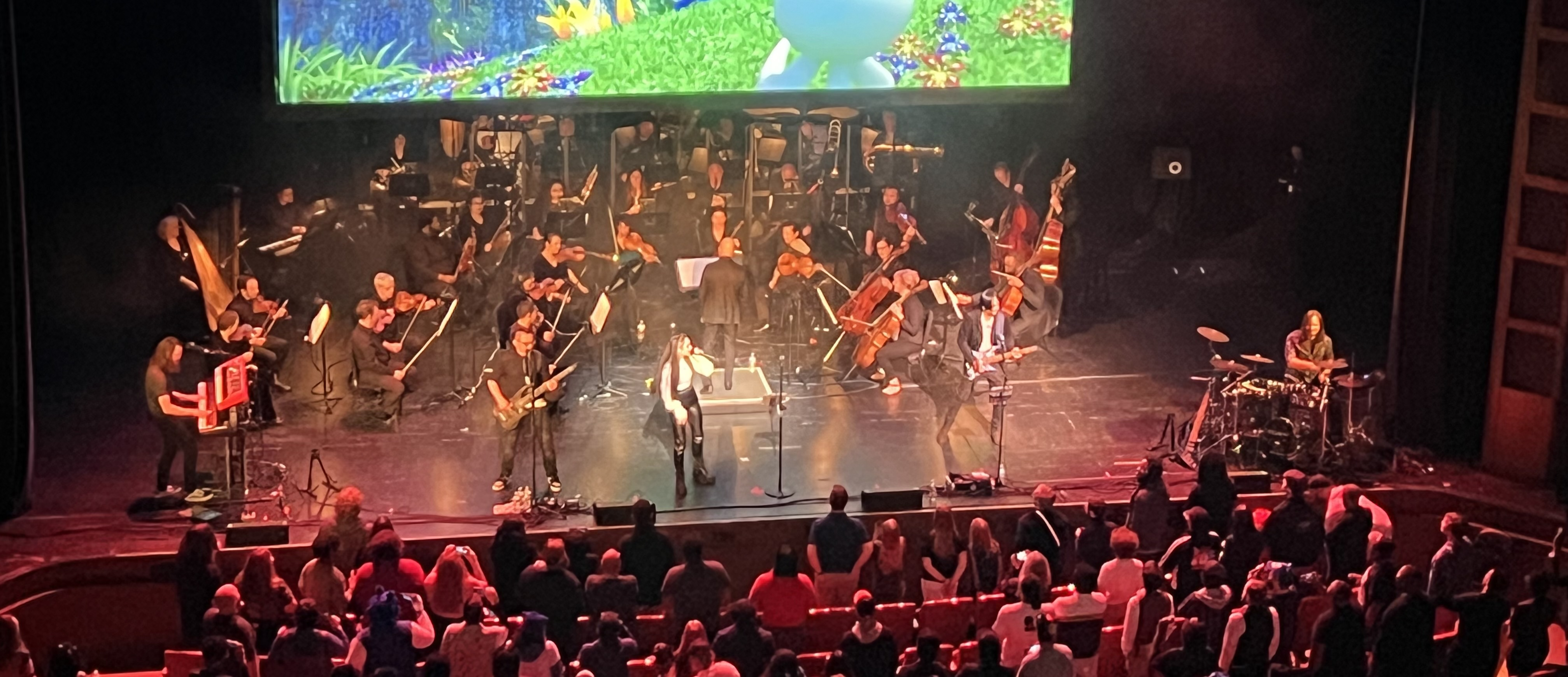
Orchestral performance (top) and orchestral and rock performance (bottom) of December 29, 2023 Sonic Symphony World Tour concert at Atlanta, Georgia, United States

On May 19, 2023, two dates in London, England and Los Angeles, California, United States for the Sonic Symphony World Tour were announced. The Sonic Symphony World Tour is produced by Sega and soundtrec, and presented by MGP Live. Pre-sale for subscribers to the official newsletter started on May 25, 2023 and public sale started a day later. Guest stars are to appear at certain dates. More dates were announced in the Sonic Central presentation on June 23, 2023, with pre-sale starting on June 28, 2023 and public sale on June 30, 2023.

During the Fearless: Year of Shadow marketing campaign in 2024, music related to the character Shadow the Hedgehog was included in Sonic Symphony World Tour's setlist.

== Reception ==
The Sonic the Hedgehog 30th Anniversary Symphony was received positively; Andy Robinson of Video Games Chronicle and Daniel Hollis of Pure Xbox noted such reception from fans. Ash Parrish of Kotaku and Kenneth Shepard of Fanbyte reported that they cried of happiness and the former described the concert as "a heartwarming, tear-inducing, nostalgic happy-time-memory-recalling performance that surpassed all expectations". Stephen Tailby of Push Square called it "a brilliant musical trip down memory lane" and Hollis of Pure Xbox deemed it "the perfect birthday treat" and "one of the best things SEGA has produced in a long time for their trusty mascot".

== Set list ==
=== 30th Anniversary Symphony ===
The following set list is of the Sonic the Hedgehog 30th Anniversary Symphony and is not intended to represent all dates; later concerts incorporated themes from games released after the 30th anniversary, including Sonic Frontiers and Sonic Superstars.

First act

1. "Sonic the Hedgehog Medley"
2. "Sonic the Hedgehog 2 Medley"
3. "Sonic Game Gear Medley" (Note: A medley of themes from the 8-bit versions of Sonic the Hedgehog and Sonic the Hedgehog 2, Sonic Drift 2, Sonic the Hedgehog: Triple Trouble, and Tails Adventure)
4. "Sonic 3 & Knuckles Medley"
5. "Sonic Mania Medley"
6. "Sonic SEGA Saturn Medley" (Note: A medley of themes from the Saturn games Sonic R, Sonic Jam, and Nights into Dreams)
7. "Believe in Myself" / "It Doesn't Matter"
8. "Sonic the Hedgehog (2006) Medley"
9. "Sonic Unleashed Medley"
10. "Sonic Lost World Medley"
11. "Sonic Forces Medley"
12. "Sonic Colors Medley"

Intermission

13. "Chao Garden - Neutral"

Second act

14. "Reach for the Stars (Re-Colors)"
15. "Speak with Your Heart"
16. "Endless Possibility"
17. "Open Your Heart"
18. "Sonic Heroes"
19. "Green Light Ride"
20. "Sonic Boom"
21. "I Am... All of Me"
22. "Knight of the Wind"
23. "Escape from the City"
24. "Live & Learn"

Credits

25. "Friends"

=== Sonic Symphony World Tour ===
The following setlist was performed at Line Cube Shibuya in Tokyo, Japan on February 11, 2024, and is not intended to represent all of the shows on tour.

First act

1. "Sonic the Hedgehog Medley"
2. "Sonic CD Medley"
3. "Sonic the Hedgehog 2 Medley"
4. "Sky Sanctuary"
5. "Sonic Mania Medley"
6. "Believe in Myself" / "It Doesn't Matter"
7. "Chao Medley"
8. "Rooftop Run"
9. "Aquarium Park" / "Planet Wisp"
10. "Sonic Frontiers Medley"

Second act

11. "I Am... All of Me"
12. "What I'm Made Of..."
13. "Open Your Heart"
14. "Knight of the Wind"
15. "Sonic Superstars Opening Theme"
16. "His World"
17. "Reach for the Stars (Re-Colors)"
18. "Fist Bump"
19. "Break Through It All"
20. "Undefeatable"
21. "I'm Here (Revisited)"

Encore

22. "Find Your Flame"
23. "Endless Possibility"
24. "Escape from the City"
25. "Live & Learn"

== Tour dates ==
=== Individual concerts ===
List of tour dates with city, country, and venue
Date	City	Country	Venue
June 23, 2021	Online		
October 12, 2022	São Paulo	Brazil	Expo Center Norte (Brasil Game Show)

=== Sonic Symphony World Tour ===
List of tour dates with city, country, venue, and number of concerts
Date	City	Country	Venue	Concerts
September 16, 2023	London	United Kingdom	Barbican Hall	2
September 30, 2023	Los Angeles	United States	Dolby Theatre	2
October 14, 2023	São Paulo	Brazil	Expo Center Norte (Brasil Game Show)	2
October 15, 2023	São Paulo	Brazil	Expo Center Norte (Brasil Game Show)	2
October 21, 2023	Boston	United States	Colonial Theatre	1
October 28, 2023	Chicago	United States	Auditorium Theatre	1
December 15, 2023	San Antonio	United States	Majestic Theatre	1
December 29, 2023	Atlanta	United States	Cobb Energy Performing Arts Centre	1
January 5, 2024	Seattle	United States	Paramount Theatre	1
January 6, 2024	San Francisco	United States	Louise M. Davies Symphony Hall	1
January 20, 2024	Washington, D.C.	United States	Warner Theatre	1
January 27, 2024	Kansas City	United States	Kansas City Music Hall	1
February 11, 2024	Tokyo	Japan	Line Cube Shibuya	1
February 17, 2024	Toronto	Canada	Meridian Hall	1
March 24, 2024	Montreal	Canada	Salle Wilfrid-Pelletier	1
March 29, 2024	Portland	United States	Arlene Schnitzer Concert Hall	1
April 6, 2024	Milwaukee	United States	Bradley Symphony Center	2
April 7, 2024	Milwaukee	United States	Bradley Symphony Center	2
April 20, 2024	Cleveland	United States	Playhouse Square	1
June 2, 2024 (Note: Was originally going to be held on September 22, 2023, but was postponed)	Paris	France	Le Grand Rex	1
June 8, 2024	New York City	United States	United Palace	2 (Note: A second show was announced on February 26, 2024 due to increasing demand from a sold out show that was scheduled later on that day)
June 15, 2024	Phoenix	United States	Phoenix Symphony Hall	1
June 16, 2024	Salt Lake City	United States	Abravanel Hall	1
June 22, 2024	Minneapolis	United States	Orpheum Theatre	1
June 29, 2024	Greensboro	United States	Steven Tanger Center for the Performing Arts	1
July 27, 2024	San Diego	United States	San Diego Civic Theatre	1
September 15, 2024	Boston	United States	Symphony Hall	1
September 21, 2024	Los Angeles	United States	Dolby Theatre	1
September 28, 2024	London	United Kingdom	Eventim Apollo	1
October 11, 2024	São Paulo	Brazil	Expo Center Norte (Brasil Game Show)	3
October 12, 2024	São Paulo	Brazil	Expo Center Norte (Brasil Game Show)	3
October 13, 2024	São Paulo	Brazil	Expo Center Norte (Brasil Game Show)	3
October 12, 2024	Chicago	United States	Auditorium Theatre	1
October 19, 2024	Orlando	United States	Dr. Phillips Center for the Performing Arts (Walt Disney Theater)	1
October 26, 2024	Houston	United States	Bayou Music Center	1
November 15, 2024	Nashville	United States	Tennessee Performing Arts Center	1
December 14, 2024	Newark	United States	New Jersey Performing Arts Center	1
December 28, 2024	Dallas	United States	AT&T Performing Arts Center	1
January 4, 2025	Atlanta	United States	Cobb Energy Performing Arts Centre	1
January 11, 2025	Washington, D.C.	United States	Warner Theatre	1

== Cancelled dates ==
List of canceled dates with city, country, venue, and number of concerts
Date	City	Country	Venue	Concerts
November 17, 2023	Düsseldorf	Germany	Mitsubishi Electric Halle	1
October 5, 2024	Charleston	United States	North Charleston Performing Arts Center	1
November 23, 2024	Philadelphia	United States	Metropolitan Opera House	1
