= Sonic Adventure 2 =

2001 video game

- Dreamcast cover art by Yuji Uekawa
- Developer: Sonic Team USA
- Publisher: Sega
- Director: Takashi Iizuka
- Producer: Yuji Naka
- Designer: Takashi Iizuka
- Artists: Kazuyuki Hoshino; Yuji Uekawa
- Writer: Shiro Maekawa
- Composers: Jun Senoue; Fumie Kumatani; Tomoya Ohtani; Kenichi Tokoi
- Series: Sonic the Hedgehog
- Platforms: Dreamcast; GameCube; PlayStation 3; Xbox 360; Windows
- Release: June 19, 2001: Dreamcast; NA: June 19, 2001; WW: June 23, 2001 GameCube; JP: December 20, 2001; NA: February 11, 2002; EU: May 3, 2002; AU: May 17, 2002 PlayStation 3, Xbox 360; WW: October 2, 2012 Windows; WW: November 20, 2012
- Genres: Platform, action-adventure
- Modes: Single-player, multiplayer

Sonic Adventure 2 (Note: Japanese: ソニックアドベンチャー2, Hepburn: Sonikku Adobenchā Tsū) is a 2001 platform game developed by Sonic Team USA and published by Sega for the Dreamcast. It features two good-vs-evil stories: Sonic the Hedgehog, Miles "Tails" Prower, and Knuckles the Echidna attempt to save the world, while Shadow the Hedgehog, Doctor Eggman, and Rouge the Bat attempt to conquer it. The stories are divided into three gameplay styles: fast-paced platforming for Sonic and Shadow, third-person shooting for Tails and Eggman, and exploration-based treasure hunting for Knuckles and Rouge. Like previous Sonic the Hedgehog games, the player completes levels while collecting rings and defeating enemies. Outside the main gameplay, they can interact with Chao, a virtual pet, and compete in multiplayer battles.

After the release of Sonic Adventure (1998), Sonic Team was downsized and a portion of the staff moved to San Francisco to establish Sonic Team USA. They worked on Adventure 2 for a year and a half, with Takashi Iizuka directing and Yuji Naka producing. Developed during a tumultuous period in Sega's history, Adventure 2 had a significantly smaller development team than the first game. Sonic Team USA streamlined the design to emphasize faster, more action-oriented gameplay, giving each character roughly equal gameplay time. The levels were influenced by American locations such as San Francisco and Yosemite National Park. The soundtrack—composed by Jun Senoue, Fumie Kumatani, Tomoya Ohtani, and Kenichi Tokoi—spans genres including pop-punk, glam metal, rap and orchestral arrangements, and features several metal singers.

Sonic Adventure 2 was released in June 2001, coinciding with the franchise's tenth anniversary. It was the final Sonic game for a Sega console, released in the months after Sega discontinued the Dreamcast and transitioned to third-party development. Later in 2001, it was ported to the GameCube as Sonic Adventure 2 Battle, the first Sonic game for a Nintendo console. Adventure 2 received positive reviews, with praise for its gameplay variety, visuals, and music but criticism for its camera, voice acting, and plot. Although reviews of Battle were more mixed, it sold 1.7 million copies worldwide, becoming one of the bestselling GameCube games and the bestselling third-party GameCube game. Following Adventure 2, Sonic became a multiplatform franchise, beginning with Sonic Heroes (2003).

Sonic Adventure 2 introduced Sonic to a wider audience with its GameCube port. It originated characters and elements used in later games; Shadow became one of the most popular Sonic characters and featured in the spin-offs Shadow the Hedgehog (2005) and Shadow Generations (2024). Adventure 2 remains popular among Sonic fans and was rereleased for the PlayStation 3, Xbox 360, and Windows in 2012. Its first level, City Escape, is considered one of the greatest opening stages in a video game. Adventure 2 has been ranked among the best Sonic games, although it has been characterized as divisive, particularly for its emphasis on multiple characters. Its story has been adapted in media including in the anime series Sonic X (2003–2005) and the live-action film Sonic the Hedgehog 3 (2024).

== Gameplay ==
The three gameplay styles (from top to bottom, left to right): fast-paced platforming for Sonic and Shadow; multidirectional shooting for Tails and Doctor Eggman; and open exploration for Knuckles and Rouge

Sonic Adventure 2 is a 3D platform game divided into two campaigns: Hero and Dark. In the Hero campaign, players control Sonic, Tails, and Knuckles, who fight to save the world; in the Dark campaign, players control Shadow the Hedgehog, Doctor Eggman and Rouge the Bat, fighting to conquer it. Each campaign cycles through levels of its three characters, telling different sides of the story. Levels have a variety of themes (such as cities, jungles, desert pyramids and outer space), with some followed by boss fights. The two campaigns' stories occur in parallel; completing both campaigns unlocks a final story with all six characters, culminating in a final boss fight.

Sonic and Shadow's levels are fast-paced and emphasize platforming. Their homing attack can lock on to robots created by Eggman and GUN, and they can grind on rails. Tails's and Eggman's levels are slower and oriented towards multidirectional shooting; they are confined to mechs in which they can jump short heights, hover and shoot enemies. Knuckles's and Rouge's levels feature open exploration with treasure hunting; in each level, they must find three shards of the Master Emerald. Their search is guided by radar and puzzle-based clues from harmless robots. Knuckles and Rouge can glide, defeat enemies with punches and kicks, and scale walls, digging into them to find power-ups.

Adventure 2 has the health system found in many other Sonic games. The player collects rings scattered throughout the levels; being hit by an enemy while holding rings causes the player to drop them all, while being hit without rings causes them to lose a life. Tails and Eggman have health bars, which are slowly refilled by collecting rings. Dying with no lives results in a game over screen. The characters can obtain permanent upgrades that grant them new abilities; for example, one upgrade allows Sonic and Shadow to dash along a sequential trail of rings to reach distant platforms, one gives Tails and Eggman hover jets that slows their descent to cross large gaps, while another lets Knuckles and Rouge dig into the ground to uncover treasure and Master Emerald pieces.

Separate from the main campaigns, the player can raise Chao as virtual pets. They have five attributes (Swim, Fly, Run, Power and Stamina) and a moral continuum from Hero to Dark. From the moment they hatch, their stats can be increased with Chaos Drives or small animals, found in the main stages, which empower them to compete in karate and racing minigames. Their alignment gradually changes based on their affection for the characters; for example, a Chao which likes Tails will gradually become more heroic. Playing with Chao increases affection, and when a Chao becomes fully Hero or Dark, it assumes that form permanently. Although Chao eventually die, if they receive enough affection during their lives they reincarnate.

Adventure 2 has 180 emblems, earned for a variety of tasks. Each level has five missions; only the first is required to continue the campaign, and other missions include completing a harder version of a level and collecting 100 rings. The player earns emblems by completing missions and other tasks, many related to Chao raising. Collecting all the emblems unlocks a 3D version of the Green Hill Zone stage from the original Sonic the Hedgehog.

The game has several two-player modes. Players may race on foot through new (or altered) levels, have shoot-'em-up battles in mechs, hunt for Master Emerald shards or race in go-karts. A few characters are playable in these modes, but not in the main game; Tikal and Chaos from the original Sonic Adventure are playable in the treasure-hunting game, as are Amy Rose and Metal Sonic in the foot-racing levels and mechs piloted by Chao and Big the Cat (replaced by a Dark Chao in Battle) in the shooting levels.

== Plot ==
Doctor Eggman learns of a secret weapon from the diary of his deceased grandfather, Professor Gerald Robotnik, and infiltrates a high-security Guardian Units of Nations (GUN) facility to revive it with a Chaos Emerald. The weapon—Shadow, a black hedgehog who can teleport using "Chaos Control" and proclaims himself the "Ultimate Lifeform"—offers to help Eggman conquer the world, telling him to rendezvous at an abandoned space colony, the ARK, with more Chaos Emeralds. Shadow has vowed to fulfill a promise he made to his friend, Eggman's cousin Maria, before she died; the amnesiac Shadow interprets the promise as one of revenge. Shadow steals a Chaos Emerald, and GUN arrests Sonic after mistaking him for Shadow.

Knuckles encounters Eggman and Rouge, a government spy, attempting to steal the Master Emerald. He stops them by shattering it and searches for the scattered shards to repair it. Rouge follows Eggman to the ARK, where Shadow shows Eggman the Eclipse Cannon, another weapon created by Gerald. Shadow plans to charge the cannon with the seven Chaos Emeralds and use it to take over the world. Rouge offers her services and gives Shadow and Eggman another Chaos Emerald to gain their trust. Tails and Amy infiltrate GUN's base and rescue Sonic, while Rouge retrieves three emeralds from the base before Eggman destroys it. Eggman makes a global broadcast in which he threatens to destroy the planet if he is not accepted as Earth's ruler within 24 hours. He demonstrates the cannon's power by destroying half of the Moon. Sonic, Tails, and Amy meet up with Knuckles and use a Chaos Emerald to track the others to the ARK.

Knuckles separates from the group and finishes repairing the Master Emerald. On the ARK, Tails gives Sonic a counterfeit Chaos Emerald to destroy the Eclipse Cannon. As Sonic is about to use it, Eggman captures Tails and Amy, forcing Sonic to return and rescue them. Sonic tries to trick Eggman with the fake emerald, but Eggman deduces the plan and jettisons him in an escape pod rigged with explosives. Sonic uses the fake emerald to perform Chaos Control and escape, while Eggman sneaks away with the last emerald and arms the Eclipse Cannon. The ARK suddenly starts falling, and a prerecorded message from Gerald is broadcast globally: he programmed the ARK to collide with and destroy Earth if the emeralds were used, a retaliation against the government for condemning his research and killing his colleagues, including Maria. Everyone but Shadow works together to access the cannon's core and neutralize the ARK using the Master Emerald.

Amy pleads for Shadow's help, and he remembers that he promised Maria to help mankind, not destroy it. Shadow joins Sonic and Knuckles in the core as they encounter the Biolizard, a colossal lizard and prototype Ultimate Lifeform. Knuckles deactivates the Chaos Emeralds with the Master Emerald, but the Biolizard fuses with the cannon to continue the ARK's collision course. Sonic and Shadow use the emeralds to transform into their super forms, destroy the Biolizard, and use Chaos Control to put the ARK back into a stable orbit. This depletes Shadow's energy and he plummets to Earth, content in fulfilling his promise to Maria. The people on Earth celebrate as the group returns, and Sonic bids Shadow farewell.

== Development ==
=== Conception ===
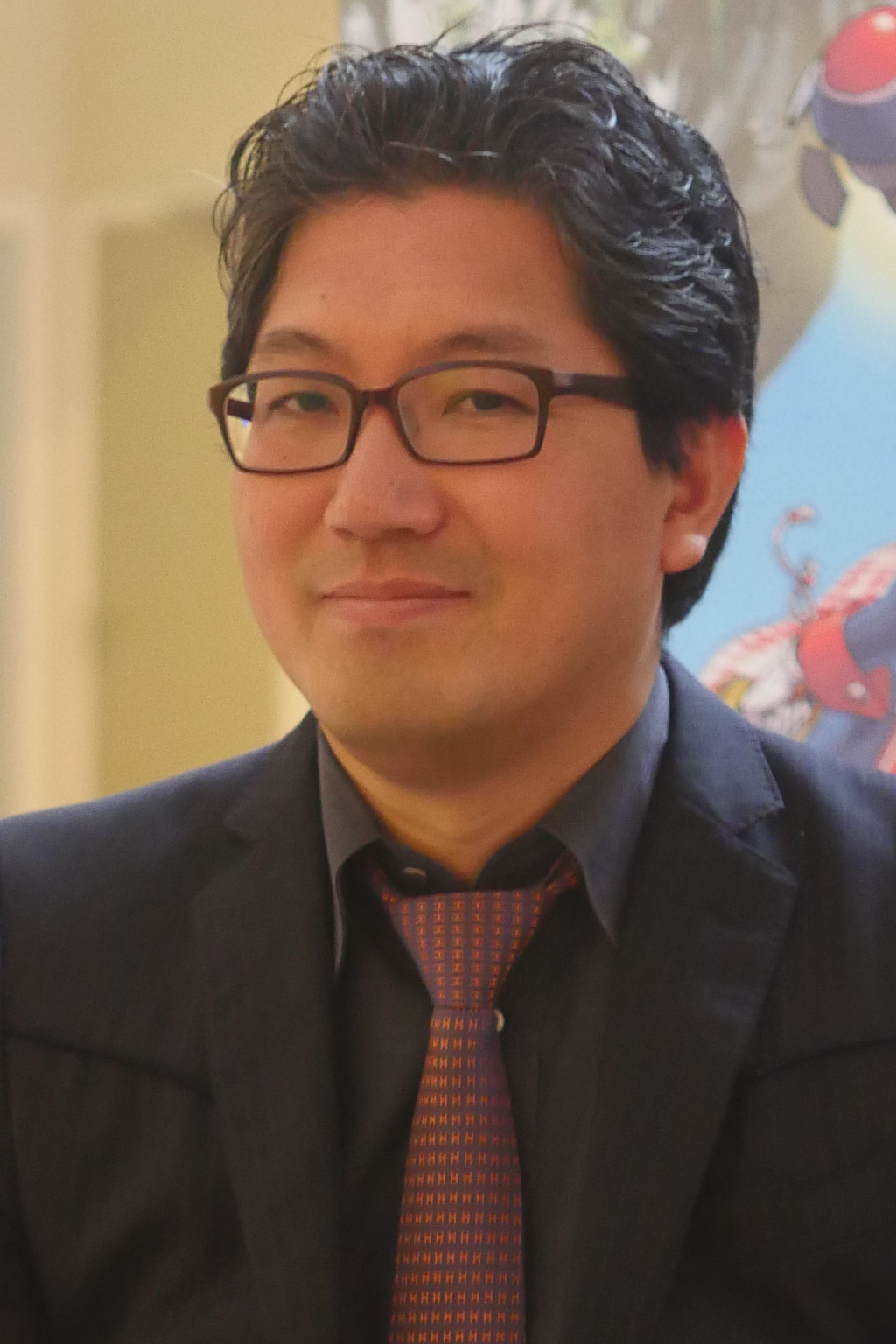
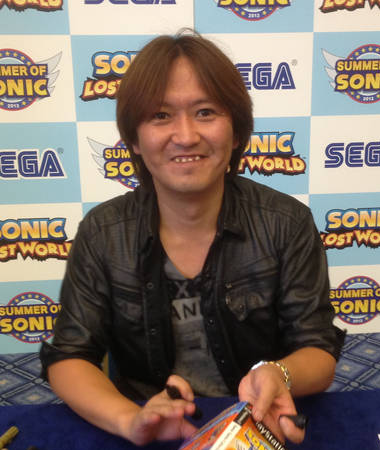
Sonic Adventure 2 was produced by Yuji Naka (left) and directed by Takashi Iizuka (right).

Sonic Adventure, the first 3D platformer in Sega's Sonic the Hedgehog franchise, was developed by Sonic Team and released for the Dreamcast in Japan in 1998. Although the game was a critical and commercial success, Dreamcast sales struggled to meet Sega's expectations. The Adventure team was downsized, and Sega relocated Adventure's director, Takashi Iizuka, to San Francisco, California, to establish Sonic Team USA. Sega wanted to repeat the pattern of developing a game in Japan and its sequel in the US as it had done with the original Sonic and Sonic the Hedgehog 2 (1992). Only 11 staff members—significantly smaller than Adventure's team of 120—joined Iizuka, and they began working on Sonic Adventure 2 after they spent six months localizing Adventure for the West.

Shiro Maekawa, who wrote portions of Sega's Panzer Dragoon Saga (1998) and joined Sonic Team during Adventure's production, conceived and wrote Adventure 2's story. Maekawa accepted the role after he learned that he did not need to be an artist to create a story or storyboards. Because Adventure 2 would be the first Sonic game released during the 21st century, Maekawa wanted a substantial portion of the story to take place in space. The rest of Sonic Team was apprehensive, but Maekawa convinced them. Maekawa drew influence from the manga and anime he had enjoyed since childhood, including Please Save My Earth (1986–1994). As Maekawa disliked Sonic as a character, he used Adventure 2 as an opportunity to revise him to suit his tastes.

Among Sonic Team's unimplemented Adventure concepts was a black hedgehog who rivaled Sonic's coolness. The idea was revived during Adventure 2's brainstorming sessions. The rival was initially villainous, but Iizuka decided to appeal to American audiences with an antihero, a popular archetype in the US. He cited the Image Comics character Spawn as an influence. Maekawa struggled to develop the concept until writing lines for a scene in which Sonic confronts the hedgehog for impersonating him. Maekawa settled on a delicate, pure character who would refer to himself using the more humble Japanese pronoun boku (僕). He was originally named Terios the Prisoner, but was renamed Shadow after another new character, a bat, who became Rouge. Sonic Team saw Shadow as a one-off character who would not appear in subsequent Sonic games.

As with the first game, Adventure 2 was directed by Iizuku and produced by the Sonic co-creator Yuji Naka. Development lasted around a year and a half, and a total of 15 or 16 people worked on it. Three or four staff were recruited from Sega's arcade game division. Iizuka said that the team had to change their work ethic and prioritize efficiency to adapt to the reduced manpower. He recalled: "Each member of the staff had to be as efficient as possible, using the smallest amount of time and money they could!"

=== Design ===
Iizuka summarized Sonic Adventure 2's development as "trying to make the impossible possible", as Sonic Team USA had to overcome the challenge of creating a game comparable in scope to the first Adventure with less than a tenth of the staff. Despite this, he considered Adventure 2 the most fun Sonic game to develop, as the small team meant "we were able to condense all the good elements from the previous game, and deliver a story and game that was satisfying to players everywhere". Due to the smaller staff, Sonic Team USA split Adventure 2 into two campaigns featuring character teams instead of Adventure's format of six starring individual characters. Adventure 2 uses the same game engine, with improved texture quality and collision detection.

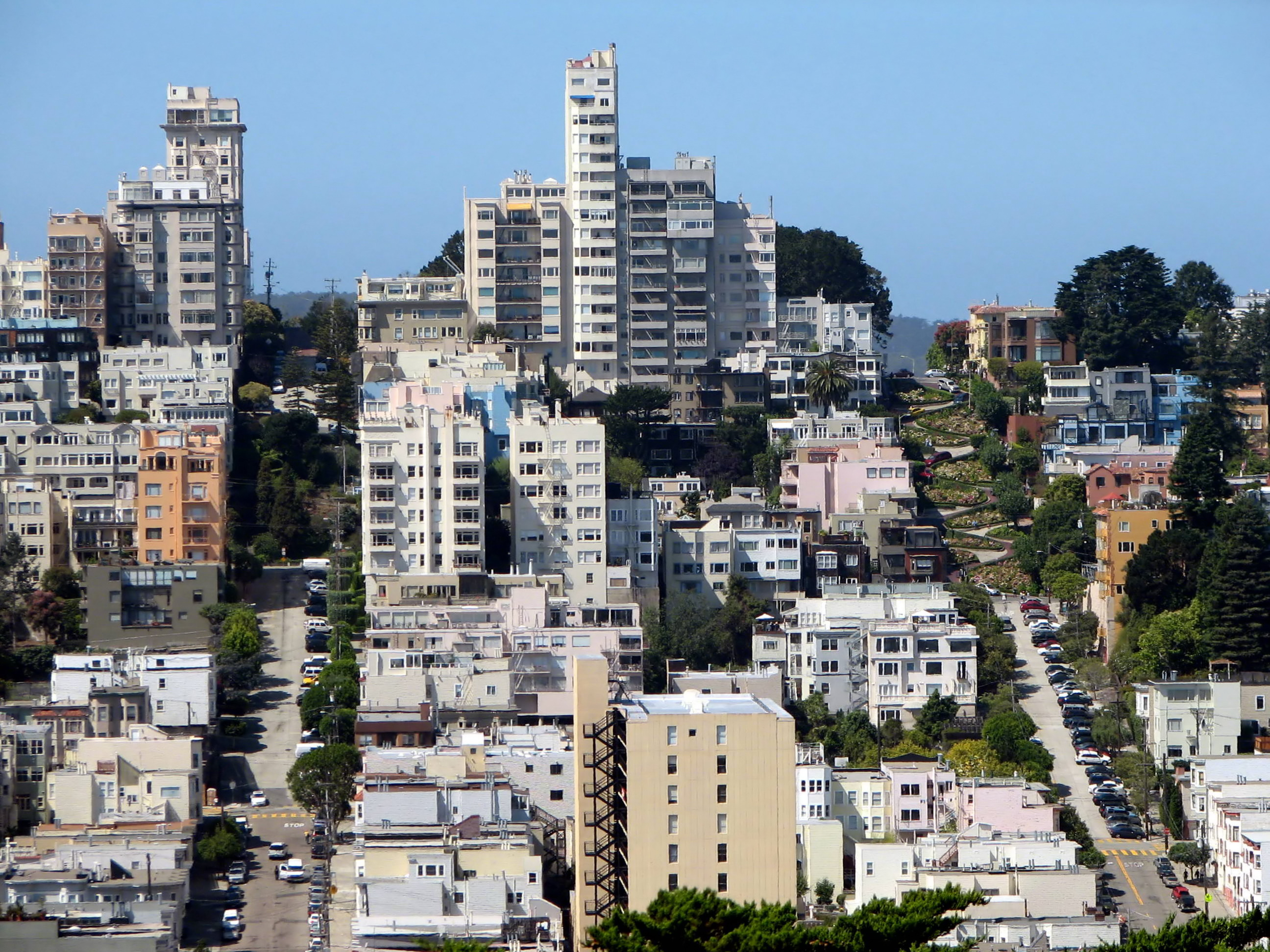
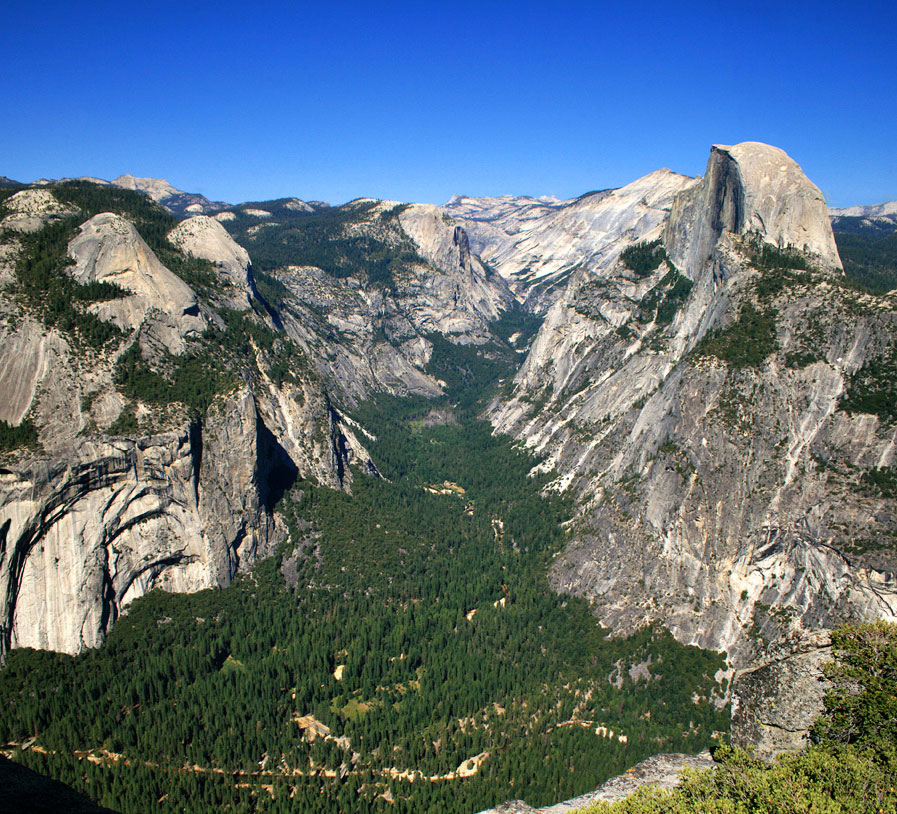
Sonic Adventure 2's scenery was inspired by San Francisco (left) and Yosemite National Park.

Sonic Team designed Adventure 2 as faster and more action-oriented compared to the slower, more story-focused Adventure. Whereas Sonic Team had tried to include as much content as possible in Adventure, for Adventure 2 they concentrated on the elements they deemed necessary. Iizuka noted that players who prioritized action found much of Adventure's content pointless, so Sonic Team USA sought to streamline the experience while retaining Adventure's "bulkiness". They removed the hub worlds in favor of linear level progression more in line with the older Sonic games, and divided action and exploration sequences among the characters rather than mixing them. Each level was tailored for its character, and unlike Adventure, in which some playable characters had short campaigns, all six Adventure 2 characters have roughly equal gameplay time.

Iizuka said Adventure 2 was designed to have "more of an American flavor" than Adventure, since it was developed in the US. The art director, Kazuyuki Hoshino, noted Sonic was a character designed to appeal to Western sensibilities, and working in the US allowed Sonic Team USA to capture an American atmosphere more successfully. The levels, drawn from Maekawa's story and setting, were inspired by American locations such as Yosemite National Park (where the team vacationed) and the San Francisco Bay Area. Iizuka said they did not intend to "create a simulation of San Francisco" but rather to reflect the influence of their surroundings. The staff frequently received parking tickets from authorities; as a joke, they included the authorities' cars in a level where Sonic could destroy them. The month Adventure 2 was to be released to manufacturing, one artist suggested adding Green Hill Zone, the original Sonic the Hedgehog's first stage. Iizuka liked the idea but expected the rest of the team to object, so he, the artist, and a programmer spent a week working on it separately.

Among Sonic Team USA's goals were a frame rate of 60 frames per second (FPS) to make the gameplay feel faster and a multiplayer mode. Achieving 60 FPS required some design tweaks, but Naka said Sonic Team's experience with the Dreamcast hardware made it possible. He felt that by then, Sonic Team had "gotten to the point where we can tap the full power of the console and deliver a much better experience to users". Sonic Team USA gave Sonic more abilities, such as grinding on rails, to add rhythm to ensure the gameplay was not only about speed. Sega collaborated with Soap, a company that produced shoes with plastic concavities in the sole for rail grinding, to have Sonic wear a pair of Soap shoes rather than his traditional boots. Soap product placement appears throughout the game as well. Like Adventure, Sonic Team USA included Chao to add replay value. Iizuka described the Chao as a "relatively neutral entity" in Adventure, so in Adventure 2, Sonic Team USA added the ability to raise "Hero" and "Dark" Chao to reflect the conflict between good and evil. Sonic Team USA gave Chao the ability to socialize and interact, which Naka felt "took [them] a step closer to a real artificial life form".

=== Music ===
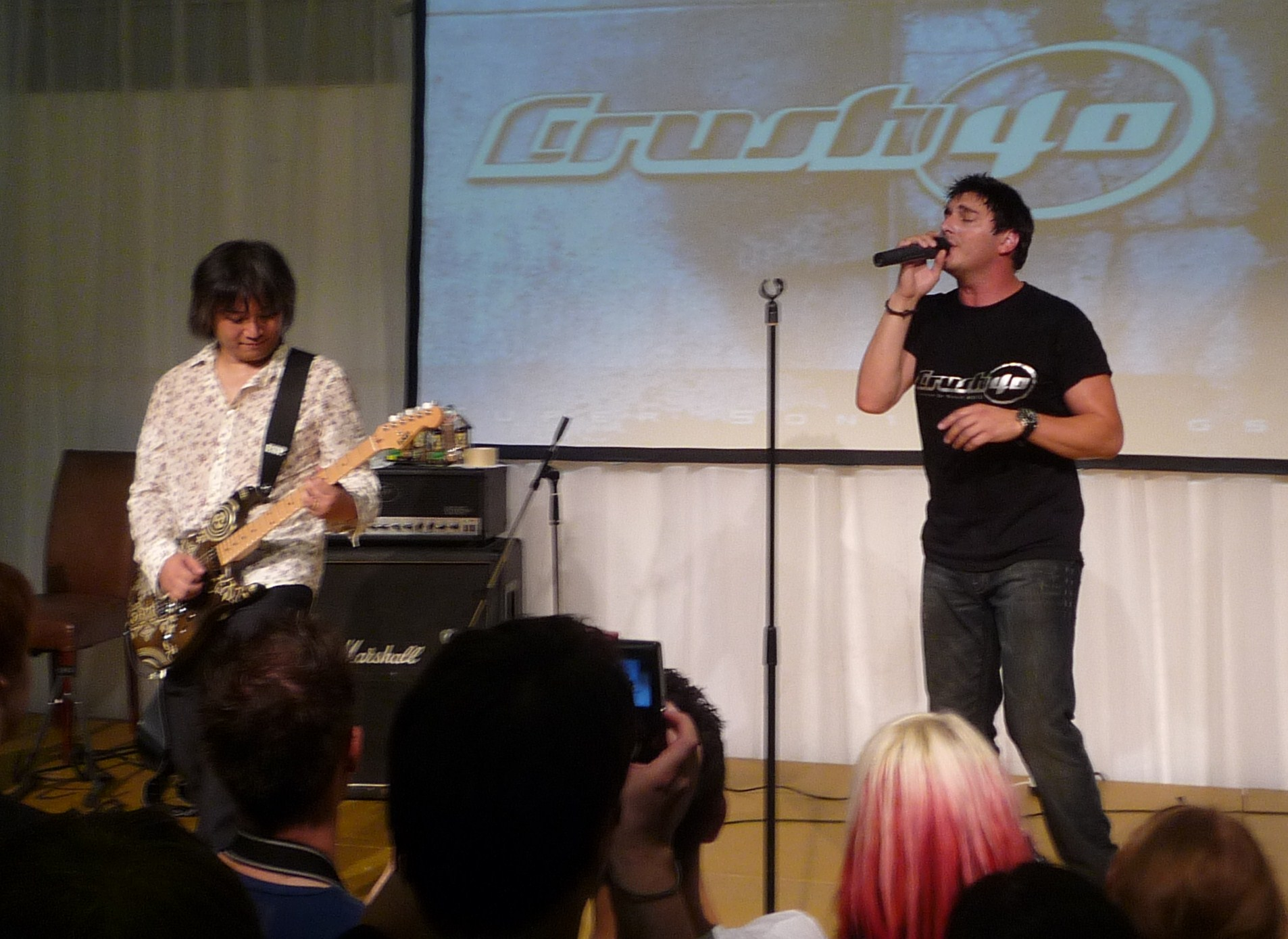
As Crush 40, Jun Senoue (left) and Johnny Gioeli (right) recorded the Adventure 2 theme, "Live & Learn".

Sonic Adventure 2's soundtrack was composed by Jun Senoue, Fumie Kumatani, Tomoya Ohtani, and Kenichi Tokoi, with Senoue as the lead composer and sound director. Senoue, Kumatani and Tokoi returned from Adventure, while Ohtani made his first contributions to a Sonic game. Senoue began writing in April 2000; he worked closely with Sonic Team USA regarding Adventure 2's structure, design, and characters. Half the music was produced in the US, while the other half was produced in Japan. Like Iizuka, Senoue considered Adventure 2 his favorite Sonic game to work on, as he found working with a small team in a new environment invigorating.

Senoue wanted the soundtrack to stand out rather than merely serve as background music. He was not entirely satisfied with the first Adventure soundtrack, feeling some tracks did not fit, and sought to compose music that suited the atmosphere of each area. He said the music team made a pact "to write songs that promoted the game's speed and situations while keeping the best tempo of the stage". They decided to compose each character's level themes in a different genre and divided the work by which genre each composer was most interested in. For instance, Knuckles' stages feature rap music composed by Ohtani, who wanted to focus on a new musical element. Tokoi said the soundtrack explores more genres than the first game's, and other genres include pop-punk, glam metal, and orchestral arrangements.

Singers featured in the soundtrack include Johnny Gioeli of Hardline, Ted Poley of Danger Danger, Tony Harnell of TNT, and Paul Shortino of Rough Cutt. The soundtrack is divided into level-specific tracks and character themes, with leitmotifs similar to professional wrestler entrance music. Senoue reused most of the character theme lyrics from the first Adventure, but wrote new music. As Crush 40, he and Gioeli produced the main theme, "Live & Learn". Senoue recorded the introduction for the Adventure 2 demo; he worked on the rest later and completed it within a day, while Gioeli wrote the lyrics. Senoue then sent a demo to Gioeli to record his vocals. Gioeli, who was paid US$3,000 for his work, said that he managed the recording and composition based on Senoue's demos. Takeshi Taneda played bass and Katsuji Kirita of Gargoyle and the Cro-Magnons played drums. Poley wrote and performed "Escape from the City", the first level's theme. He found writing video game music different, as "you have to have a lot of action and alliteration. It creates a whole mood and there's no time for breath—the song is over in a minute and a half, and it's intense." The rapper Hunnid-P performed Knuckles' level themes.

Senoue made a demo for each track using an ADAT system to track guitars or vocals and a Yamaha digital console or Mackie analog mixer for mixing. He edited tracks with his Macintosh before testing them in-game. Once Senoue was satisfied and received Sonic Team USA's approval, he finished sequencing and sent demos to prepare for the recording sessions. The soundtrack was recorded across five sessions in Los Angeles, New York City and Tokyo. While he enjoyed studio work, Senoue described the last three months as chaotic, as he had to travel between Tokyo, San Francisco and Los Angeles within weeks to write and record music. Senoue finished the soundtrack in February 2001, after which he worked on the sound effects.

== Release ==
Sega announced Sonic Adventure 2 at E3 in May 2000 with a trailer premiere behind closed doors and a press release. Game Informer reported that it was 40% complete at that time. Sega released the trailer online when it launched Sonic Team's website on June 30. It planned to release Adventure 2 between the 2000 Christmas shopping season and early 2001; GameSpot reported a February 2001 release date. In late 2000, Sega informed journalists that Adventure 2 had been delayed to later in 2001, and in December, allowed journalists to play a demo. Early copies of Sonic Team's Phantasy Star Online, released in Japan in December and worldwide in January 2001, were bundled with the demo. It features the opening cutscene and level, ending with a trailer showcasing later levels.

Sega showcased Adventure 2 again at E3 in May 2001. On June 13, Archie Comics published a brief adaptation in its Sonic the Hedgehog comic book, written by Karl Bollers and penciled by Patrick Spaziante. According to Ken Penders, one of the series' writers, the creative team was unable to adapt the story in full due to Sonic Team's desire for secrecy; they were only able to work from the demo and a few screenshots. Penders said they considered adapting the story in a separate Super Special issue, but Archie had ceased publishing one-shots at the time.

Adventure 2 was released on June 19, 2001, in North America and June 23 in other countries. The worldwide release coincided with Sonic's tenth anniversary, and Sega marked the occasion in its marketing. In Japan, Sega offered a limited edition "Birthday Pack" for two days that included Adventure 2, a gold disc containing Sonic music, a commemorative gold coin, and a 17-page booklet detailing the series' history. On June 30, Sega held a celebration at a Software Etc. in San Jose, California, where attendees could have birthday cake, partake in giveaways, and receive Naka's autograph.

=== GameCube port ===
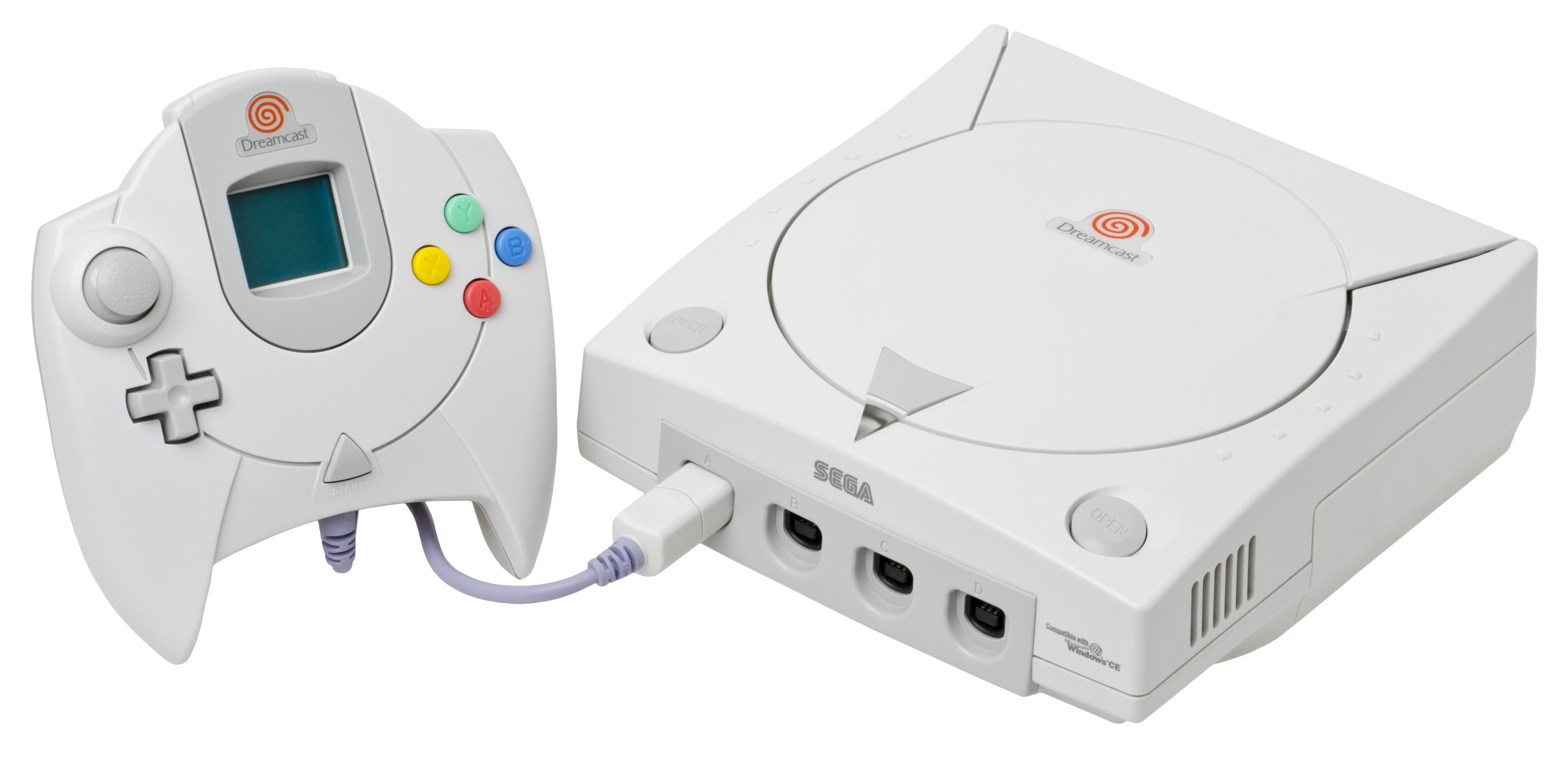
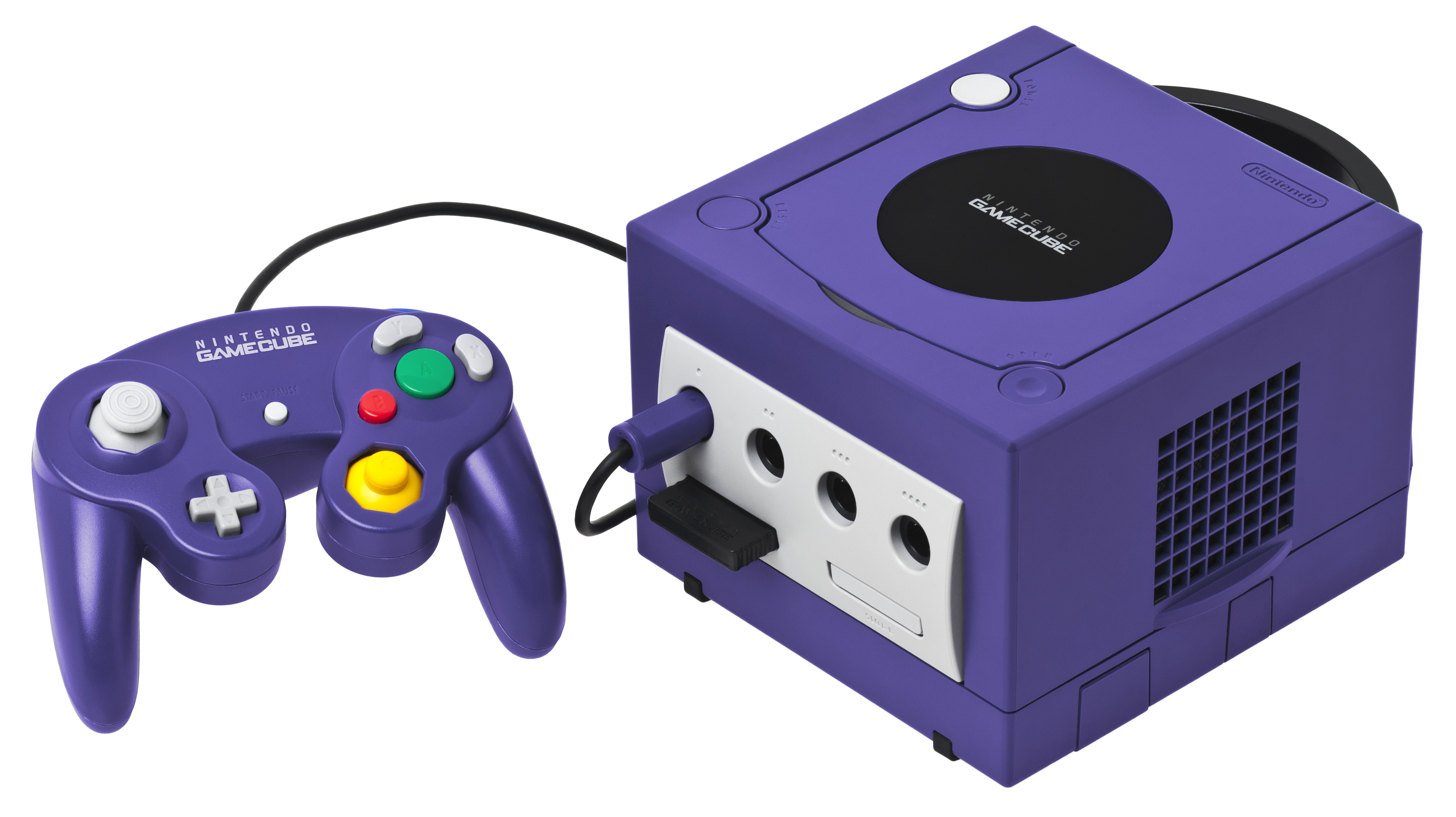
Sonic Adventure 2's Dreamcast (left) release was Sonic's final appearance on a Sega console, while the GameCube (right) port marked its first appearance on a Nintendo console.

Sonic Adventure 2 was released during a tumultuous period in Sega's history. Amidst competition from Sony Computer Entertainment's PlayStation 2, a lack of support from important third-party developers, and conflict within Sega, Dreamcast sales failed to meet Sega's expectations. Peter Moore, the president and chief operating officer of Sega of America, said the Dreamcast would need to sell five million units in the US by the end of 2000 to remain a viable platform, but Sega fell short of this goal with three million units sold. Moreover, Sega's attempts to spur sales through lower prices and cash rebates caused escalating financial losses. On January 31, 2001, Sega announced it was discontinuing the Dreamcast to become a third-party developer, although it remained committed to releasing first-party Dreamcast software through 2001. The third-party transition made Adventure 2 one of the last major Dreamcast exclusives and the final Sonic game for a Sega console. Much of Sonic Team's staff, including Naka, opposed the move as they had already entered pre-production on Sonic Adventure 3, but were unable to fight it.

In April 2001, Sega announced Sonic Team was working on a game for Nintendo's GameCube. Sonic Team kept the project a secret until its reveal at Nintendo Space World in August. Naka liked the GameCube hardware, and advised Sonic Team fans to purchase GameCubes. Shortly before Space World, Sega confirmed rumors that the project was a port of Sonic Adventure 2, subtitled Battle. This marked Sonic's first appearance on a Nintendo console, which GameSpot called "an unbelievable milestone of epic proportions". Sonic Team left the single-player gameplay mostly unchanged, but added multiplayer options such as new maps and characters. Battle replaces the VMU's implementation with connectivity with the Game Boy Advance (GBA) game Sonic Advance (2001), facilitated through the GameCube – GBA link cable. Visually, Battle features texture resolution increases, though some textures are blurrier, while colors are brighter. Battle was released in Japan on December 20, 2001, in North America on February 11, 2002, in Europe on May 3, 2002, and in Australia on May 17, 2002.

=== Sales ===
The Dreamcast version of Sonic Adventure 2 sold more than 84,000 copies during its first week in Japan (a franchise record), and a total of around 500,000 copies worldwide. The Escapist wrote that these numbers were impressive given that the Dreamcast had already been discontinued. In Japan, the GameCube version sold almost 50,000 copies during its first month, and had sold 192,186 by December 23, 2002. In North America, it was the bestselling GameCube game between January and August 2002, selling 465,000 copies. By August 2002, it had sold more than a million copies worldwide. Cumulative sales reached 1.7 million, and by July 2006, it had earned $44 million in the US. According to Next Generation, it was the 42nd-bestselling game for the GameCube, PlayStation 2, or Xbox between January 2000 and July 2006 in the US. It is one of the bestselling GameCube games and the bestselling third-party GameCube game.

== Reception ==
Reception

Aggregate score
Aggregator	Score
Metacritic	(DC) 89/100 (GCN) 73/100

Review scores
Publication	Score
Edge	7/10
Famitsu	9/10, 8/10, 7/10, 9/10 (DC); 9/10, 8/10, 8/10, 8/10 (GC)
GamePro	4.5/5
GameRevolution	B
GameSpot	8.6/10
IGN	9.4/10
Next Generation	3/5

Sonic Adventure 2 received "generally favorable" reviews. Critics appreciated its multiple playing styles. According to Edge and Four-Eyed Dragon of GamePro, the three styles and bonus features such as Chao gardens were engaging. Johnny Liu of GameRevolution praised its replay value of multiple playing styles and 180 different goals. Anthony Chau of IGN called it one of the best Sonic games: "If this is the last Sonic game in these declining Dreamcast years, it's satisfying to know that the DC didn't go out with a bang, but with a sonic boom." In 2022, IGN named it one of the best Dreamcast games.

The camera was panned. Shahed Ahmed of GameSpot criticized the "cardinal sin" of 3D platform games: forcing players to jump to an out-of-frame platform. Although players can re-orient the camera with the trigger buttons, it reverts when the character moves. According to Chau and Liu, this made searching cramped sections of Knuckles' and Rouge's levels frustrating. Edge found camera problems permeating the game, with no significant improvement from Adventure.

The visuals received positive reviews. Liu called them "sweet, sweet eye-crack". Four-Eyed Dragon wrote that the game "is simply jaw-dropping beautiful," citing its detailed backgrounds and scenery and the characters' extensive color palettes. According to Chau, the game had "some of the best textures ever seen" and was one of the most beautiful Dreamcast games. Edge was impressed by the texture detail and draw distance, and Chau, Liu and Ahmed praised its 60-frame-per-second rendering speed.

Senoue's soundtrack also received positive reviews. According to Ahmed, the music was an improvement over Adventure's "campy glam-rock and J-pop soundtrack", with less emphasis on lyrics, while Liu appreciated its more "understated" approach. Four-Eyed Dragon called the music "an eclectic mix of orchestrated masterpieces, guitar tunes, and melodic hip-hop voices" that "gracefully fill the game's ambiance to a perfect pitch." Reactions to the voice acting were divided; according to Ahmed, "the voice acting, and the lip-synching in particular, is executed quite well," and Liu and Chau found the English voices inferior to the Japanese ones.

The plot was derided, although its presentation was well received. Ahmed wrote, "Throughout the game the plot becomes more and more scattered and lackluster," not focusing long enough on one element to execute it meaningfully. Although Liu agreed that despite the game's ambitious scope and themes it failed to advance the series' core plot beyond the Sega Genesis Sonic games, Edge appreciated the story's presentation from both perspectives: hero and villain.

Despite high review scores for the Dreamcast version, the GameCube version released six months later received mixed reviews: respective Metacritic and GameRankings scores of 73 percent and 72.33 percent. Critics generally felt that it was not significantly improved from the Dreamcast original. However, Shane Bettenhausen of GameSpy saw Adventure 2 Battle as noticeably superior; in addition to its upgrades, its action was better suited to the GameCube's controller than the Dreamcast's.

=== Accolades ===
Sonic Adventure 2 received several accolades, including the 2001 IGN's Editors' Choice Award. ScrewAttack called it the fifth-best Dreamcast game, and GamesRadar rated it the tenth-greatest Dreamcast game out of 25: "Despite trailing off significantly in recent years, the 3D side of the Sonic the Hedgehog franchise had a surprisingly stellar start with the Sonic Adventure entries, and the 2001 sequel really amped up the action." In February 2014, IGN's Luke Karmali called Battle his tenth-favorite game of all time. In a video interview with Sonic Team studio head Takashi Iizuka, he says Sonic Adventure 2 is his favourite game in the series.

== Post-release ==
Development on the next game, Sonic Heroes (2003), began at Sonic Team USA shortly after Adventure 2's completion. Iizuka chose to develop it as a standalone game rather than a sequel to appeal to a broader audience. Heroes became the first multiplatform Sonic game when it was released for the GameCube, PlayStation 2, and Xbox in late 2003. Another 2003 Sonic Team game, Billy Hatcher and the Giant Egg, uses an updated version of the Adventure 2 engine, and Ohtani, who first composed Sonic music for Adventure 2, became the series' sound director with Sonic the Hedgehog (2006).

Sega's discontinuation of the Dreamcast made Sonic Adventure 2 the last Sonic game that Sonic Team—which had worked with Sega hardware teams to take advantage of their consoles—produced with the benefits of first-party development. Whereas Adventure 2 had been made using proprietary software, Sonic Team USA partnered with Criterion Software to use RenderWare so Heroes could be programmed and ported across platforms. Iizuka described the loss of first-party development benefits as the greatest challenge of the third-party transition, as his team "no longer [had] the ability to control what we need[ed] to make our games". Naka said he had mixed feelings about Sonic as a multiplatform franchise, and departed to form his own studio, Prope, in 2006.

Shadow quickly proved popular among fans, so Sonic Team USA retconned his apparent death in Adventure 2's finale to include him in subsequent Sonic games, beginning with Heroes. After Heroes, Sonic Team USA was renamed Sega Studios USA. Their next project was Shadow the Hedgehog (2005), a spin-off starring Shadow that continues plot threads established in Adventure 2. The division developed Nights: Journey of Dreams (2007) before it was merged back into the Japanese Sonic Team in 2008. Iizuka became the head of Sonic Team following the merger.

=== Soundtracks ===
Marvelous Entertainment released a collection of Sonic Adventure 2 songs, Cuts Unleashed Sonic Adventure 2 Vocal Collection, on August 18, 2001, before releasing the full two-disc soundtrack album, Multi-dimensional Sonic Adventure 2 Original Sound Track, on September 5. Tokyopop released a soundtrack in the US on February 5, 2002, ahead of the GameCube version's release, featuring 26 tracks selected by Senoue and US-exclusive remixes. On November 30, 2011, Sega released the soundtrack on iTunes via its Wave Master label to coincide with the franchise's 20th anniversary. Brave Wave Productions released a vinyl version of the soundtrack including interviews with Senoue and Iizuka in 2018.

=== Rerelease ===
Sega released a port of Sonic Adventure 2 as a downloadable game for the PlayStation 3 (via PlayStation Network) and Xbox 360 (via Xbox Live Arcade) on October 2, 2012, and for Windows (via Steam) on November 20. The port followed a similar reissue of the first Adventure in 2010 and was branded as part of Sega Heritage, a 2012 initiative in which Sega rereleased popular games from its back catalog on modern consoles. The rerelease features high-definition graphics and widescreen support, though some cutscenes are still presented in 4:3. Otherwise, it is mostly identical to the original versions; it lacks the Dreamcast version's online features and the GameCube additions are paywalled as downloadable content (DLC). In 2017, the PlayStation 3 version was made playable on the PlayStation 4 and Windows via the cloud gaming service PlayStation Now, and the Xbox 360 version was made backward compatible with the Xbox One.

== Legacy ==
=== Retrospective assessments ===
Sonic Adventure 2 is frequently ranked among the best Sonic games. (Note: Game Informer: #9; GameSpot: #5; GamesRadar+: #15; IGN: #3; Kotaku: #16; Polygon: #7; TechRadar: #5; USgamer: #9) GameSpot and Kotaku deemed it a satisfying conclusion to Sonic's run on Sega hardware, and Game Informer considered it a worthy sequel to Adventure. However, journalists have characterized Adventure 2 as divisive, (Note: Attributed to multiple references: The Escapist, Polygon, GamesRadar+, and USgamer) and the 2012 rerelease received "mixed or average reviews" according to Metacritic. Some fans regard Adventure 2 as the franchise's pinnacle, but others find it unfocused—"a jack of all trades, master of none", as The Escapist wrote. According to The Escapist, "depending on who you ask, [it] represent[s] the franchise at its best and at its worst."

Common elements of retrospective praise include Sonic and Shadow's levels, (Note: Attributed to multiple references: The Escapist, Game Informer, IGN, Kotaku and TechRadar) the Chao Garden, (Note: Attributed to multiple references: Destructoid, IGN, Nintendo Life, Polygon, TechRadar, and USgamer) and the soundtrack. (Note: Attributed to multiple references: Destructoid, The Escapist, Kotaku, USgamer, Vice) GamesRadar+ felt Adventure 2's increased speed and emphasis on spectacle positively influenced the series. Conversely, its focus on multiple characters with different gameplay styles has been divisive. While IGN praised the gameplay variety, Kotaku noted that many only like the Sonic and Shadow levels; retrospective reviewers have criticized the other characters as frustrating and cumbersome. (Note: Attributed to multiple references: The Escapist, Game Informer, Kotaku, Nintendo Life and Vice) Game Informer found Tails and Eggman's levels fine, but Knuckles and Rouge's annoying. Nintendo Life disagreed, writing Knuckles and Rouge were "entertaining enough" while Tails and Eggman were "rubbish". To TechRadar, the gameplay variety meant the quality of levels fluctuated more than it did in Adventure, though Sonic and Shadow's levels were a significant improvement. Kotaku appreciated the other characters' levels for their immersion, despite their poor quality.

Additional criticism has been directed at the camera for obscuring enemies and platforms, poor voice acting and audio mixing, and the story. (Note: Attributed to multiple references: Destructoid, The Escapist, VentureBeat, and Vice) The audio mixing, in which characters' dialogue in cutscenes frequently overlaps, has been described as infamous. The Escapist and VentureBeat called the story nonsensical, Destructoid said it "almost feels like work to get through", and Vice jokingly compared it to a Bob Books take on Armageddon. Nintendo Life felt the plot would have been interesting were it not for the plot holes caused by events playing out differently across campaigns. However, VentureBeat praised the good-vs.-evil presentation as clever and adding unexpected nuance to the villains' motivations, and Rock Paper Shotgun said the story was one of Sonic's best despite some melodramatic moments. They highlighted the scene in which Eggman destroys the Moon as considerably more impactful than his schemes in later games.

VentureBeat wrote that Adventure 2 did not hold up to modern standards, finding its camera and reliance on trial-and-error design outdated, and Destructoid said it was only redeemed by how engaging the Chao Garden was. A Vice writer, while playing Adventure 2 for the first time in a decade, said that "[I've] been forced to reconcile my nostalgia with the harsh reality that it is not a terrific game". VentureBeat wrote that it was more worth remembering for its historical significance as the last Sonic game for a Sega console than it was worth replaying. Others conceded that Adventure 2 is flawed, but argued this was negated by its merits. (Note: Attributed to multiple references: Kotaku, TechRadar, and USgamer) Nintendo Life said Adventure 2's many "bizarre design choices" made it endearing, and Kotaku said it "felt equal parts triumphant and bittersweet... Adventure 2 has plenty of flaws, but you can tell Sonic Team was working hard to build off the best parts of its previous Adventure and play out Sega's home console era with style."

Following Adventure 2, Sonic's critical standing began to decline, which VentureBeat attributed to Sega "depending on stupid gimmicks to sell their most iconic property" following the third-party transition. The Escapist wrote that subsequent Sonic games, such as Sonic the Hedgehog (2006), Sonic Unleashed (2008), and Sonic Forces (2017), attempted to replicate the Adventure 2 format of varied gameplay styles, but failed because they did not develop each style fully. VentureBeat said Adventure 2's alternate gameplay styles were natural additions to Sonic whereas those in subsequent games, such as Unleashed's Werehog segments and Sonic and the Black Knight's (2009) swordplay, were not.

=== City Escape ===
Journalists have described City Escape, Sonic Adventure 2's first level, as one of the best opening stages in a video game.

Sonic Adventure 2's first level, City Escape, has been described as one of the best opening stages in a video game. The level, which serves as a tutorial, depicts Sonic as he escapes GUN and features sequences in which he snowboards through streets and outruns a murderous truck. Red Bull said it was "unquestionably Sonic's finest hour since the [Genesis] days", and Destructoid called it a perfect introduction to modern Sonic gameplay that encapsulates the strengths of the Adventure games. USgamer wrote that Adventure 2 is remembered more for City Escape than anything else, and Polygon said that it "represents the epitome of Sonic the Hedgehog. It's fast-paced, full of secret pathways, and more than a little absurd."

Polygon considered "Escape from the City", the City Escape theme song, the peak of the Sonic franchise, with an energetic composition and hopeful lyrics that encapsulate Sonic's character. The song was remixed in Sonic Generations (2011) and featured in the Mario & Sonic at the Olympic Games and Super Smash Bros. series of crossover games. Senoue and the band Hyper Potions produced an Irish-themed remix for a collaboration between Jacksepticeye and the Sonic social media team on St. Patrick's Day 2020. Sega produced two remixes in 2021: a Sonic 30th Anniversary Symphony remix in June, with vocals by Nathan Sharp, and a funk remix in December, performed by Lyn. The original is a selectable song in Sega's Samba de Amigo: Party Central (2023), a rhythm game which includes a City Escape-based stage. Sharp covered "Escape from the City" a second time for the Forever Fast compilation album in 2026. Poley described "Escape from the City" as his biggest hit, though he does not receive any royalties.

Generations, which commemorates the franchise's 20th anniversary, features reimagined versions of levels from past Sonic games, including 2D and 3D reimaginings of City Escape. The 2D version features the "Classic" iteration of Sonic racing the truck as it moves between the background and foreground, while the 3D version features shortcuts that take advantage of Generations's mechanics. Kotaku regarded Generations's City Escape as one of the most impactful moments of 2011, and PCMag considered it a highlight, a "prime example" of Sonic Team drawing inspiration from the franchise's history. A variation of City Escape also appears as a downloadable content in Sonic Racing: CrossWorlds (2025); this version, called "Godzilla Escape", features the city being attacked by Toho's Godzilla.

=== Influence ===
Sonic Adventure 2's GameCube port introduced Sonic to a new audience of Millennials and, alongside the compilation Sonic Mega Collection (2002), built a new fanbase following Sega's third-party transition. For this reason, The Escapist regarded it as possibly the most important Sonic game and said that while some later Sonic games were better, "[they] didn't do nearly as much to energize or even create a new fanbase". Additionally, the GameCube port paved the way for a closer relationship between Sega and Nintendo after a decade of console war hostility. Several subsequent Sonic games were exclusive to Nintendo platforms and Sonic appeared alongside Nintendo's mascot Mario in the Mario & Sonic and Super Smash Bros. games.

Sonic Team continued the gameplay style established by the Adventure games in Heroes and Sonic the Hedgehog before going in a new direction with Unleashed, which was conceived as a sequel to Adventure 2 before becoming a standalone game. Adventure 2's emphasis on spectacle influenced subsequent Sonic games. It was the first Sonic game to feature rail grinding, a mechanic used in nearly every subsequent Sonic game. Sonic Frontiers (2022) features levels that recreate the layouts of the Adventure 2 stages Metal Harbor, Green Forest, and Sky Rail, and Sonic's Soap shoes are available as DLC. Sonic fans have requested Adventure 3, but Iizuka said this would not advance the series' design.

According to PC Gamer, Shadow is the most famous modern Sonic character. He returned as a playable character in Heroes, Sonic the Hedgehog, Sonic and the Black Knight, and Forces. In 2005, Naka said Sonic Team had determined Shadow was the most popular Sonic character excluding Sonic himself, a finding reaffirmed in a 2009 Sega poll. Sonic Generations includes Shadow as a boss, and the Nintendo 3DS version includes the Biolizard boss. A 2024 Generations rerelease was bundled with Shadow Generations, a Shadow game that features recreations of Adventure 2 levels and bosses. Rouge also became a recurring character; a 2006 Sega poll found her the tenth-most-popular Sonic character.

"Live & Learn" remains a popular Sonic song. It has appeared in at least 25 games since Adventure 2, including non-Sonic games such as the Maimai, Phantasy Star, Super Smash Bros., and Yakuza series. Crush 40 performed a remix featuring the Prague Philharmonic Orchestra as the finale of the Sonic 30th Anniversary Symphony. In 2024, Gioeli filed a lawsuit against Sega for breach of contract regarding the ownership of "Live & Learn"; he said that he was unaware that Sega kept reusing the song, to which he claimed the copyright. He sought US$500,000 in damages and another US$500,000 in unpaid royalties for its use outside of Adventure 2. The lawsuit was dismissed with prejudice in August 2025.

=== Adaptations ===
Sonic Adventure 2 was adapted in the second season of the anime series Sonic X (2003–2006). The Japanese voice cast reprised their roles for the adaptation, while the licensing corporation 4Kids Entertainment, which handled the American localization, hired a new voice cast for the English dub. Although Archie Comics did not adapt Adventure 2 in full in its Sonic comic, it did so in the second issue of the spin-off publication Sonic Universe in March 2009; the adaptation was written by Ian Flynn and penciled by Tracy Yardley and Steven Butler.

The live-action feature film Sonic the Hedgehog 3 (2024) is an adaptation of Adventure 2. It features several scenes that reference Adventure 2, such as Shadow's captivity in a GUN facility, Sonic leaping out of a helicopter, and Sonic and Shadow collaborating to stop the Eclipse Cannon. "Live & Learn" is featured throughout as a leitmotif and the song plays during the climax. Although the film mostly follows the Adventure 2 story, it features some differences, such as the absence of City Escape and Gerald Robotnik appearing alive in the present rather than being limited to flashbacks. The writers, Pat Casey and Josh Miller, did not have time to replay Adventure 2 and based the adaptation on what they remembered.
