= Sonic the Hedgehog fandom =

Fan community of the Sonic franchise

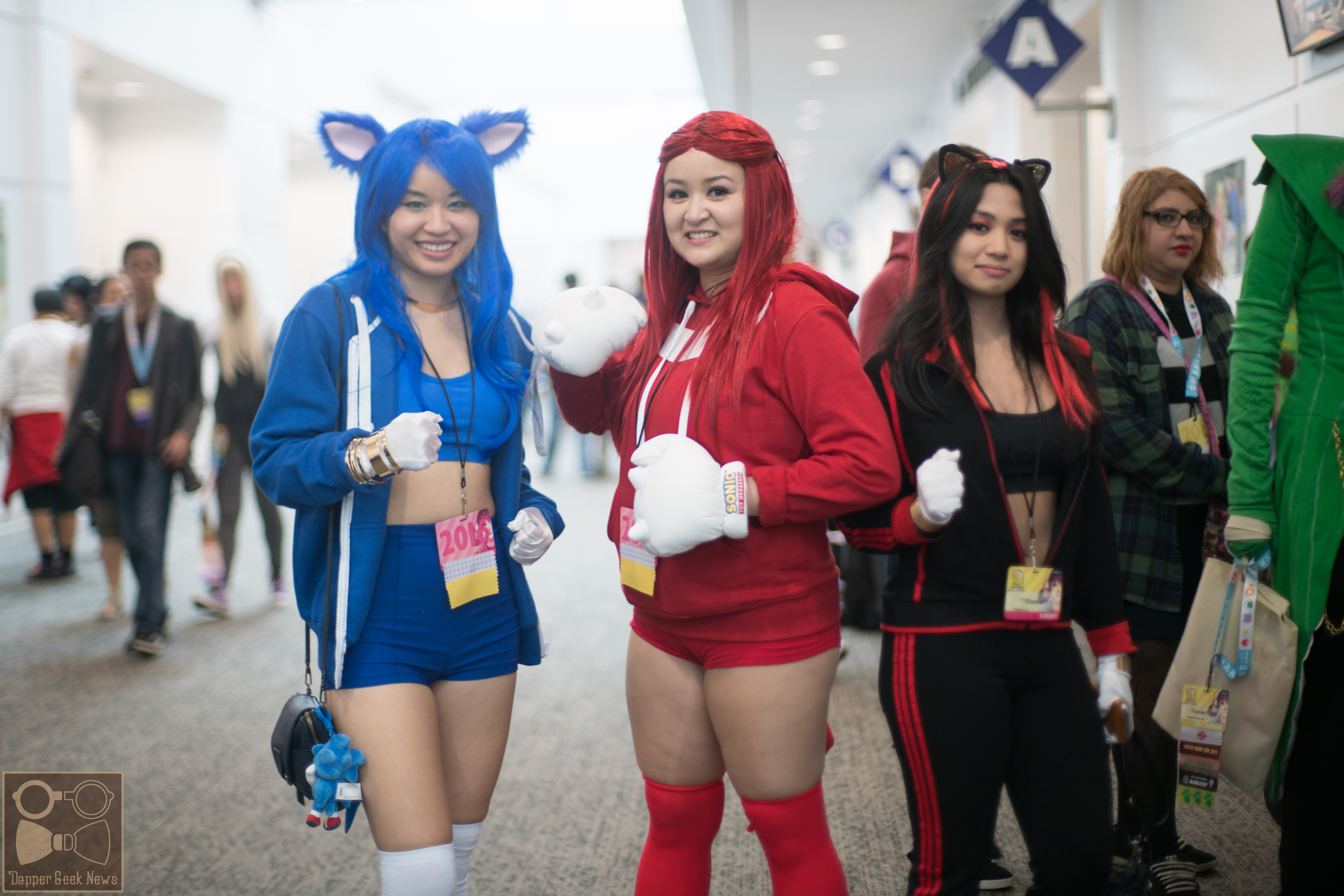
Sonic the Hedgehog cosplayers at Anime Los Angeles 2016

Sonic the Hedgehog is a Japanese video game series and media franchise that originated from the 1991 game for the Sega Genesis, which was spawned from franchise publisher Sega's request for a mascot to compete against Nintendo's Mario. Following the game's success, numerous sequels, successors, spin-offs, television series, and feature films have been produced, each with varying levels of critical and commercial reception. While initially successful, the series gained a negative reputation during the 2000s for its poorly-received installments and has frequently been a subject of mockery.

Over the course of the franchise's multidecade history, Sonic the Hedgehog gained a significant fandom, whose members have created extensive fan works, including fan art, fan fiction, fan games, modifications and websites. Fans often create original characters called Sonic OCs, which have become popular outside the fandom. The subculture intersects with the furry fandom and internet culture. Several Sonic-related internet memes have surfaced from the fandom, with some having been referenced in official Sonic media. While generally tolerated by Sega, the fandom has occasionally been criticized for certain fan-produced content and fan behaviors.

== History ==
The Sonic the Hedgehog series and its main protagonist Sonic gained significant popularity among children in the 1990s. It expanded beyond video games to include animated series and comic books. During the mid-1990s, the series' prominence declined due to fewer releases and competition from the rising popularity of Sony's PlayStation console. It began to recover following the announcement of Sonic Adventure (1998) for the Dreamcast. Its comic book series by Archie Comics gained popularity among fans during Sonic's decline and fans of the comic book series created websites hosted on GeoCities.

Fans of the series were noted to have form connections with its protagonist, Sonic, often identifying as his friend or companion rather than himself. The children's book author Caleb Zane-Huett discuss Sonic has always been a character with his own personality; for example, Sonic would break the fourth wall with annoyance. Zane-Huett said that Sonic the Hedgehog (1991) does much to persuade the player that he is not just a player-controlled character which provides a vision where the player questions who they are in the game.

Sonic's decline continued to the 2000s with its games receiving poor or mixed reviews—especially Sonic the Hedgehog (2006), likewise poorly received by players. The fandom fragmented and diversified, but survived. The game's impact led fans to coin the term "The Sonic Cycle" in 2008, originating on NeoGAF, describing the pattern of hope followed by disappointment with each new Sonic game. The formulation of "The Sonic Cycle" consisted of three stages: the announcement, the reveal of recurring characters, and poor reception. The cycle then repeats with the next major Sonic announcement. Titles that followed this cycle included Sonic and the Black Knight (2009) and Sonic Free Riders (2010). By 2014, Sonic had been mostly known for its romantic fan fictions and comedic fan art. Despite its decline, some fans held hope for its return to glory, and other celebrate it for some reasons. Nick Thorpe, Retro Gamer writer and a fan of the series, stated that he always looks forward to new entries in spite of the poor reception.

When the teaser trailer for the 2020 Sonic the Hedgehog film was released, director Jeff Fowler asserted that the team behind the film received heavy criticism over Sonic's design. Fowler then confirmed that changes to Sonic's design would be made. Numerous fan edits then went viral on social media platforms such as Twitter. Writing for Vice magazine, Samantha Cole reported that many members of the furry fandom thought the design was ugly and argued that Paramount Pictures should hire one of them to design Sonic instead. However, member Amethyst Basilisk found the design to be appealing and interesting for the furry fandom.

== Fan base ==
=== Analysis ===
Intelligencer writer Colin Spacetwinks wrote how the Sonic franchise fits in between Christian media and popular culture. He describes that Sonic embraces coolness, without the use of sexual or violent imagery, as the character has a personality and an attitude which Spacetwinks describes him as the "cool" alternative to Mario during the Sega-Nintendo console wars. Despite not having any explicit references, the franchise had feature plots and characters that Christian youth can relate to. This results in the franchise's mass appeal to the Christian youth demographic, usually those limited to Christian alternatives of mass media. Many of those Christians would join Sonic fan forums, with the intent of blending in with non-Christian fans. The Christian fans often make fan content for the franchise that aligns with their religion.

Media scholar and gaming culture researcher James Newman has examined how differences in regional releases of older titles in the series, such as the distorted graphics and deaccelerated music and gameplay of the European PAL version of Sonic 1 compared to the Japanese and North American NTSC versions, has been a topic of interest amongst nostalgic players, and led to debates about authorial intent, canonicity, and preferred or inferior qualities of each. These practices also occur within the participatory culture of the fandom, in which texts (both fan and official localized translations) are judged based upon their compatibility with the series' canon and original Japanese source material, with fans often rectifying perceived inconsistencies through the creation of fan theories.

=== Online communities and conventions ===
The Sonic the Hedgehog fandom has splintered into numerous subcommunities, each developing their own identity and interests. Sonic subreddit moderator David Manzolillo declared that the fandom can make any type of fan thrive, and feel accepted regardless of their views and backgrounds. Another moderator Efrain Astorga, known as Fay online, spoke how all of the fans respect among each other despite their diverse views on the games, regarded as uncommon among other video game communities. Websites emerged to support them, such as Sonic Retro, a wiki that keeps detailed records of beta versions and hacks of official games, and Sonic the Hedgehog Area 51, a forum dedicated to the franchise's lost media and prototypes.

Summer of Sonic, an annual fan convention dedicated to the Sonic series and hosted in the United Kingdom, was founded by Svend Joscelyne and Adam Tuff and was first held in 2008. The attendees could watch both official and fan-created content shown on stage as well as interviews with Yuji Naka and Takashi Iizuka. There were also live musical performances. The convention has held over six events with the final one held during 2013, However, two special events were held during 2016 and 2019 respectively.

=== Fan-made games ===
Fans of the Sonic franchise have been known to create well-received fan games. Sega has often allowed these projects to continue without issuing cease and desists to their developers. The website Sonic Fan Games HQ hosts the online annual event Sonic Amateur Games Expo (SAGE), which showcases both fan-made and original games. Notable Sonic fan games include Sonic After the Sequel (2013), set between the events of Sonic the Hedgehog 2 and 3; Sonic Dreams Collection (2015), which satirizes the fandom; Sonic Robo Blast 2, which has continued to receive support since its development began in 1998; and Sonic P-06, an in-progress remake of the poorly received Sonic the Hedgehog (2006).

Fans have been involved in the ROM hacking community. Fans mainly create ROM hacks for the early 1990s games for the Sega Genesis, usually adding features from other games or restoring lost media. Sonic Mania, a 2017 video game released by Sega with critical acclaim, was developed by fans who have previously worked on Sonic ROM hacks, fan games, and mobile remasters of Sonic 1, 2 and CD. Whilst some fans went on to work on official games, others took inspiration from the series and created their own games. Notable original games include Freedom Planet (2014) and Spark the Electric Jester (2017). In 2016, Sega updated dozens of its Genesis re-released games (including Sonic games) on Steam with the service's workshop support, allowing fans to upload and share modification of these games on the service.

=== Fan art ===
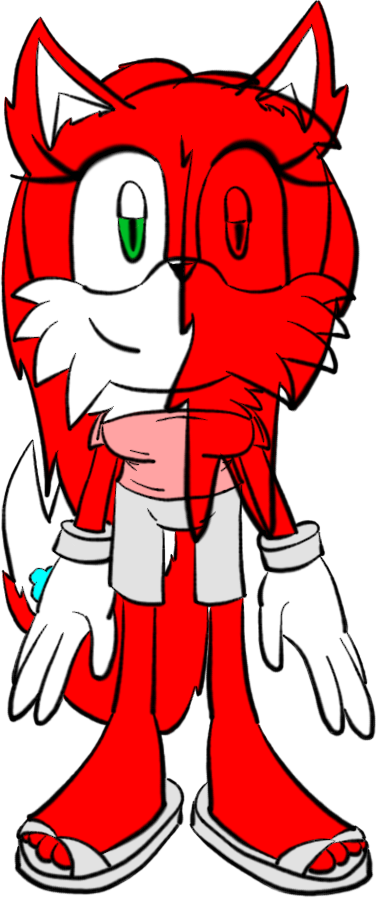
An example of a Sonic the Hedgehog original character

Fans have created fan art of the Sonic franchise, including queer art. Fan artists on the online art website DeviantArt have created groups devoted to drawing Sonic characters, sometimes depicted as humans. Fans create original characters (OC) known as Sonic OCs to be embedded into their own fictional narratives and interact with Sonic's cast directly, often posting their OCs on DeviantArt. Many fan artists who have drawn OCs perceived as low-quality have improved their skills over time. Jennifer Hernandez, a fan artist was contracted to work on the Sonic comics as a result of her fan art. Due to the vastness of Sonic OCs, a fad became popularized among people to search their name alongside the phrase "Sonic OC" and then share their results online. Tools for creating Sonic OCs exist on websites like Newgrounds. The character customization system in Sonic Forces (2017) were influenced Sonic OCs. Takashi Iizuka said his team chose not to create different body types and shapes since most of the OCs resembled Sonic's design.

Sonic the Hedgehog is a popular subject for artists and writers involved in the furry fandom, which is associated with sexual themes. Fans have occasionally drawn fetish art of Sonic. Some artists may draw him and other series characters depicted as sexually attractive. Both fandoms share similar aspects including the basis of childhood affinities and crushes that led to a more active participation, and the creation and cultivation of OCs.

Fans of the series have produced extensive erotic art online. Ben Richmond, writing for Vice, wrote that most of the art was likely created by young adolescents. Mandy Jones, a social worker, stated that young adolescents often become curious about sexuality, emphasizing the visualization of sexuality as healthy. Although, she expressed concern over the possibility of adolescents engaging in themes of sexual violence. Fans often create content involving Sonic characters gaining unrealistic amounts of weight. Examples includes feederism, vore, body inflation, and Mpreg. Fans who create Mpreg fiction of the series often fixate on Omegaverse and allow both in-series and crossover shipping.

=== Fan fiction ===
Caleb Zane-Huett and Nick Splendorr discuss that Sonic's role as more than just a player-controlled character and the franchise's struggles with plot encourages players to create their own fan fiction based on the franchise. Fan fiction authors had debates with fans over Sonic and Tails kissing as canon in the franchise. Critic Zolani Stewart implied that the Sonic comics were his favorite as he posted on Twitter about thoughts he had on specific panels, sections and images alongside the self-coined hashtag #SonicStudies. Stewart's tweets on #SonicStudies got the attention of Kotaku, who subsequently published an article on Sonic.

=== Speedrunning ===
A strong and well-developed speedrunning community has developed surrounding the Sonic series, with its games frequently appearing at events and marathons like Awesome Games Done Quick. Titles like Sonic 2 and Sonic Adventure 2 (2001) are popular submissions on streaming sites and leaderboards like Speed Demos Archive, speedrun.com, or the franchise-specific website, the Sonic Center. Writer Erica Lenti has noted that through working together to accomplish a common goal, speedrunning can strengthen social bonds, with an interviewed Sonic Mania player explaining that a "sense of community" and nostalgia for playing the games at a younger age had encouraged them to keep returning to the series.

== Internet culture ==
Sonic the Hedgehog has been recognized as a significant aspect of internet culture, especially that the franchise's popularity grew around when the World Wide Web was published. Fans online may celebrate the franchise's mediocrity due to the lack of well-received Sonic games since the 1990s. The franchise has inspired various internet memes, many of which have been acknowledged by Sega and referenced in games. Sonic memes have been used by left-leaning users to promote support for transgender rights, unionization, and higher payment for employees of video game companies. Writer Colin Spacetwinks called Sonic a "seemingly inescapable" aspect of internet culture.

=== Ugandan Knuckles ===
A deformed version of Knuckles the Echidna, with audio taken from the Ugandan comedy film Who Killed Captain Alex? (2010), began appearing on the virtual world platform VRChat, with many players using a 3D model of the character to infiltrate game worlds in attempts to annoy other players. Its design has been traced back to a one-second clip uploaded to YouTube by Gregzilla in 2017. The meme has received intense criticism for being racist towards Ugandans.

=== Pingas ===
"Pingas" is a word coined by YouTube Poop creator and artist Stegblob in 2008. In one of her videos, she inserted a short clip from an episode of the 1990s animated series Adventures of Sonic the Hedgehog. A line spoken by Long John Baldry as Doctor Robotnik, "Snooping as usual, I see", was cut down to "ping as", which became the phrase that the meme revolves around. The phrase became popular among fans after a YouTuber uploaded a video where the word replaces every note of the song "Gourmet Race" from the video game Kirby Super Star (1996). Archie Comics, an official Sonic franchise comic book publisher, later referenced the meme in issue 205 of their Sonic the Hedgehog comics series.

=== Sanic ===
External videos
- 0nyxheart's original drawing of Sanic in Microsoft Paint
- HOW 2 DRAW SANIC HEGEHOG on YouTube

Sanic is a crudely-drawn satirical depiction of Sonic who originated from a YouTube video titled "How 2 Draw Sanic Hegehog" [sic] by 0nyxheart and published on March 31, 2010. The video consists of a tutorial of how to draw Sonic in Microsoft Paint. It is soundtracked by an extremely loud and distorted version of the theme that plays during Green Hill Zone, the first level of Sonic the Hedgehog (1991). As the tutorial concludes, the phrase "cumon step it up!!!!!" [sic] is written on-screen. The video had been deleted from YouTube at some point prior to 2013, but has since been re-uploaded by others. Sanic initially became popular through 4chan, leading to users creating their own drawn variations of Sanic before branching out to various other mediums. Users of the site's /b/ board, who often called into Bill Keller's live televangelism program Live Prayer, would occasionally play the Sanic video's loud and distorted audio while calling.

Sanic is frequently acknowledged by the Sonic the Hedgehog Twitter account. Aaron Webber, the account's former social media manager, stated in an interview with Twinfinite that Sanic was "very popular around the office" and acknowledged Sega and Nintendo's divergence in their brand identity, noting "Nintendo would never post bad Mario fan art". Shortly after the v1.01 update of Sonic Forces (2017) was released, an in-game t-shirt featuring Sanic was data mined. The t-shirt was later added as a free DLC. In the film Sonic the Hedgehog (2020), Sanic makes a cameo appearance as a crayon drawing made by the character Crazy Carl, who tries to prove Sonic's existence. Sanic made a further split-second appearance in a sped-up trailer for Sonic the Hedgehog 2 (2022).

Sega has incorporated Sanic into several of its April Fools' Day campaigns. The "Sanic Collection" in 2018 featured four items, including a t-shirt, mug, and phone case. In 2021, G Fuel released a chili dog-flavored drink mix in collaboration with Sega. Writing for Inverse, James Pero described the drink mix as tasting "about as good as a shoe made out of meatloaf and asbestos". Sega released a one-day collection of t-shirts—also titled "Sanic Collection"—in 2026, featuring Sanic, Knackles (Knuckles the Echidna), and Shedew (Shadow the Hedgehog).

During interviews with Twinfinite and The Verge, Aaron Webber commented that Sanic's presence on official social media accounts, along with other Sonic memes, helped to bolster the series' reputation on social media, leading to the Twitter account doubling in followers in the year after Webber took over as its manager. In a Forbes retrospective article about the YouTube Poop genre, Zack O'Malley Greenburg highlighted Sanic's continued popularity a decade after its creation, as well as the catchphrases "gotta go fast" and "cumon step it up!!!!!", further noting that a Garry's Mod video featuring Sanic had reached nearly ten million views on YouTube. William Moo of Syfy Wire remarked that although Sega's adoption of the Sanic meme was divisive among fans, Sanic retained "widespread influence" and popularity online, and that it "continues inspiring others to make their own memes, comics, and videos and the nostalgia for such a character never went away."

== Reception ==
Sega's response to the Sonic the Hedgehog fandom has been more permissive compared to other companies. In May 2021, Sega's social media manager Katie Chrzanowski stated that the company does not have issues with fan content in most cases as long as the content is not being monetized. IGN writer Kat Bailey praised the company's stance toward fan content, with a marked contrast to other companies who commonly shut down fan projects, for example ports and tributes. The series' former writer Ken Pontac expressed mixed opinions towards the fandom, being instructed by Sega not to engage.

Hope Pisoni for The A.V. Club compared the Sonic series to Mario, Crash Bandicoot, and Spyro, all of which are well-received platformer series without the same fanbase that Sonic inspires. Zolani Stewart felt that the Sonic fandom believes in itself more than it believes in critics. Writing for USgamer, Caty McCarthy wrote that many outside the fandom usually subsequently took enjoyment from mocking the fandom and the series. The fans themselves confounds the anti-fans to its popularity. Stewart noted that Sonic fan art has become less cynical, close-minded, and myopic in the following years. He credited the queer art community for the progressive of the fan art. Polygon writer Michael McWhertor discussed how he was disappointed at the Sonic games, however praised the fandom's relationship with the furry fandom for their expression.

The Sonic fandom has drawn criticism from writers. PC Gamer writer Rich Stanton wrote that searching Sonic on Google can lead to unpleasant images and details. Authors Karis Jones and Scott Storm wrote that a student ranked the Sonic fandom as one of the worst video game fandoms of all time. The student discussed the behavior of fans and the way in which they demand content from Sega. As a result of this, the company has often been mocked and jested by fans. Whilst the student saw Sonic as embroiled in a societal obsession with violence, they remained hopeful in Sega's interaction with its fan base, with the fans themselves shifting their discourse practices towards helping the franchise. The Guardian writer Leigh Alexander wrote the franchise's decline and fan mockery led to the character Sonic often being featured in cynical art and furry pornography, of which is described as fans "stick with the intriguing cartoons of their youth even as they exit childhood and develop adult tastes."

== See also ==
- List of unofficial Sonic the Hedgehog media
