= No Straight Roads =

- Developer: Metronomik
- Publisher: Sold Out
- Directors: Wan Hazmer; Daim Dziauddin
- Producers: Lee Clare; Brian Kong; Idir Alexander Ould Braham
- Designers: Lydia Ho; Dexter Tam
- Programmer: Muhd Hanif
- Artist: Ellie Yong
- Writer: Aidi G.V.
- Composers: Falk Au Yeong; Andy Tunstall; James Landino; Funk Fiction; Masahiro Aoki
- Engine: Unreal Engine 4
- Platforms: Nintendo Switch; PlayStation 4; Windows; Xbox One
- Release: August 25, 2020
- Genre: Action-adventure
- Modes: Single-player, multiplayer

No Straight Roads is a 2020 action-adventure game developed by Malaysian independent studio Metronomik, and published by Sold Out. The focus is on an indie rock duo who battle an EDM empire to free Vinyl City from their control with the power of rock. The game combat involves listening to the music, knowing when enemies attack and when to strike. It was released on August 25, 2020, for the Nintendo Switch, PlayStation 4, Windows, and Xbox One after three years of development. An updated version, No Straight Roads: Encore Edition was released on October 21, 2021. The game received mixed reviews from critics, who praised its art style, story, themes, and music, but heavily criticized the inconsistent and overly complicated gameplay.

A sequel, No Straight Roads 2, is set to be released for Windows and consoles in 2026.

== Gameplay ==
In No Straight Roads, the player takes control of either Mayday or Zuke and can switch between them anytime in single player. The game is designed around a rhythm-based combat system in which the player can move freely without having to follow the beat, but still has to pay attention to audio cues in order to plan their moves. The music notes they collect can be used as ammunition and projectiles, and some objects can be transformed into weapons and defenses during boss battles.

Mayday and Zuke attack differently due to their specializations. Mayday's guitar swings and attack transformations deal more damage, while Zuke builds up combos with his drumsticks and provides support using his transformations. A skill tree depends on the number of fans the band has at a time. As Bunk Bed Junction's popularity rises and their number of fans increases, the player is offered upgrades to their shared abilities or additions to their individual movesets.

The game's setting, Vinyl City, is divided into districts, with each one both hosting and being led by an artist promoted by NSR. Bunk Bed Junction is to hijack their performances, take them on, claim their areas, and further open up the city to explore and power-up.

== Story ==
=== Setting ===
The game takes place in the fictional high-tech metropolis of Vinyl City, which is stated to be the music capital of the world. The city is governed by No Straight Roads (NSR), a corrupt EDM label whose goal is to monopolize the music industry and continue their control of the city and maintain order. Vinyl City is made up of several districts, with each one run by one of NSR's artists as charters. They each possess a Platinum Disc which gives them control of a certain district.

Vinyl City's power comes from a technology called "Qwasa" which turns music into efficient energy. NSR's influence lets them host the Lights Up auditions to find talented artists who can provide a source of energy for the city and meet the label's standards of order. Knowing this, Bunk Bed Junction sets out to challenge their rule.

=== Characters ===
The protagonists are the indie rock band Bunk Bed Junction consisting of Mayday (voiced by Su Ling Chan), the energetic, hot-blooded guitarist, and Zuke (voiced by Steven Bones), the self-possessed, relaxed drummer, who fight to bring back rock music to Vinyl City and defeat NSR, the EDM empire by hijacking their artists' concerts. NSR is led by the CEO Tatiana (voiced by Priscilla Patrick) who is also the prime charter of Vinyl City, and it has a roster of superstar artists which includes DJ Subatomic Supernova (voiced by Mohamad "Uncle Ali" Imran), an egotistical space-themed DJ who performs to spread his music all over the universe, Sayu (voiced by Nikki Simmons), a bubbly virtual pop idol designed as a mermaid who believes heavily in the power of love, Yinu (voiced by Damia Huda), a piano-playing child prodigy known as 'the Golden Maestro of Vinyl City', 1010 (all voiced by Muhammad Zulhilmi), a robotic navy-based boy band, and Eve (voiced by Joanna Bessey), an illusion-casting diva who creates and curates abstract art. Other notable characters are Yinu's overprotective mother (voiced by Azah Boémia Anuarul), Neon J. (voiced by Zulhilmi), 1010's cyborg manager and creator who is also a war veteran, and DK West (voiced by Alfred Loh), a well-known shadow manipulating rapper (West serves as the game’s superboss, with his fights being extremely difficult due to their reliance on a separate gameplay style, with the necessity to control May and Zuke at the same time. However, only his first encounter is necessary to progression, as once Yinu is defeated, May and Zuke can return to fight West in his second and third battles.) Many other characters inhabit Vinyl City, such as Kliff, self-proclaimed number-one fan of Bunk Bed Junction.

=== Plot ===
Indie rock duo Bunk Bed Junction, consisting of Mayday and Zuke, participate in the annual Lights Up Auditions to join record label No Straight Roads and bring rock back to relevance. The audition itself is judged by the CEO of NSR, Tatiana, and the top artists from the label as they witness Mayday and Zuke's performance to determine if they are worthy. After Bunk Bed Junction finishes the course, the artists choose to dismiss them. This sets off Mayday's temper, causing her to backtalk Tatiana. Tatiana remarks that the age of rock is over and EDM is the only genre currently in demand in Vinyl City.

On the way home, Mayday complains about NSR dismissing them, while Zuke gives them the benefit of the doubt before they come across a televised broadcast of their audition. The footage showing their performance powering the audition Qwasa to almost full capacity leads Mayday to suspicion. Tatiana then announces that due to Bunk Bed Junction's actions, she has banned rock from future auditions, and insists on any future artists to play only EDM to maintain order. All of a sudden, the power in Vinyl City goes out, and its backup energy is directed solely to NSR's elites. Reaching their breaking point, the duo decide to revolt against NSR's grip on the city to bring back rock and restore power to the people. Their first plan of action is to crash and hijack the concert of DJ Subatomic Supernova, one of NSR's artists who is the charter of the Cast Tech District and currently responsible for launching the label's new satellite.

Their defeat of DJ Subatomic Supernova grants them control of his district, in which they declare their musical revolution to Tatiana. Later, Bunk Bed Junction meets their self-proclaimed number 1 fan, Kliff, who offers to provide them with guidance on how to defeat NSR by taking down its other artists and gaining control of their districts. Their next target is Sayu, a virtual mermaid-like idol and the Akusuka District's charter, who is shown to have been created and piloted by a group of teenagers.

After Mayday and Zuke defeat Sayu, Tatiana reluctantly summons DK West, a rapper and Zuke's estranged older brother, to halt their progress. West challenges them to a series of rap battles as a way to get back at Zuke for their poor history together. After that, they continue their revolution by facing child piano prodigy Yinu of the Natura District at her recital with her controlling Mother, and robotic boy band 1010 of the Metro Division District with their cyborg manager Neon J. on their citywide tour. Following the defeat of the former, the tension between Zuke and West reaches its peak as he angrily disowns his brother, much to both West and Mayday's shock and disappointment.

After claiming Yinu and 1010's districts, they move onto NSR's top artist and Tatiana's right hand, Eve in her Dream Fever District, who is revealed to be Zuke's former band-mate and ex-girlfriend. After patching things up with Eve, a final encounter between Zuke and West commences, and Mayday, fed up with their rivalry, works to help the two brothers reconcile by revealing that despite it all, Zuke still looks up to West. After they do so, West decides to leave Vinyl City for a time to ponder on things; Zuke thanks Mayday for her efforts. Mayday and Zuke head to NSR Tower to confront Tatiana, who intends to finish them to restore EDM's order on the city. After defeating her, Tatiana is herself revealed to be Kul Fyra, a former rockstar, leader of The Goolings rock band, and Mayday's idol who brought rock to prominence in Vinyl City. After the constant chaos of new ideas and disagreements led to the band's break up, Fyra grew a hatred of rock and an obsession with order and strength, leading her to create NSR and taking control of Vinyl City through EDM (for the people who favored it), adopting the identity of Tatiana. Tatiana mocks Mayday and Zuke, questioning what they planned to do to govern the city and deal with the consequences of overthrowing NSR, as rock is shown to be equal to EDM in terms of energy output.

Kliff then appears and is revealed to be a former hardcore fan of Kul Fyra's. Betrayed by Fyra's switch to EDM, Kliff used Mayday and Zuke as a way to make rock relevant again and, after being insulted by Tatiana again when she rejects his entitled way of thinking, he hacks the NSR satellite and sets it on a crash course into NSR Tower. Realizing that Kliff enabled them to have rock replace EDM as the new dominant music genre and that doing so would only start another music monopoly and make them the new NSR, Mayday and Zuke reject him and try to fix their mistake.

Mayday and Zuke team up with Tatiana to stop the satellite by helping the NSR artists reclaim their districts and using the collective power of EDM and rock to transform the NSR tower into a giant rock hand, destroying the satellite and saving Vinyl City. As the group celebrates, Tatiana, having a change of heart over her actions and regaining her love of rock, announces her plans to rebuild NSR to allow all kinds of music to be played in Vinyl City and offers Bunk Bed Junction a place in the new direction to help them. However, Mayday and Zuke reject the offer, instead deciding to "lay low" and remain indie due to their actions and to remind themselves why they play music for the time being. Before they depart, Tatiana gives Mayday her old guitar, which Mayday tearfully accepts.

The ending narration by Tatiana reveals that since then, Vinyl City has become a place where people can perform all kinds of music, free of discrimination or restrictions, and as a result, the city is shining brighter with more energy than ever before. The game ends with Mayday and Zuke stepping out to perform in front of their adoring fans as the narrating Tatiana wishes them the best.

== Development ==
Metronomik was set up by cousins Daim Dziauddin and Wan Hazmer, who were involved in Street Fighter V and Final Fantasy XV in Japan. No Straight Roads, their debut title, was developed as a game that could be viewed as proudly Malaysian.

Hazmer was inspired by other rhythm games while developing No Straight Roads, citing games such as Gitaroo Man, Space Channel 5, and Jet Set Radio. The unrealistic skin colours of the cast were adapted from the cartoon Steven Universe, while the surreal art direction and storyline borrowed from JoJo's Bizarre Adventure, Psychonauts, and Scott Pilgrim.

Falk Au Yeong, Andy Tunstall, James Landino, and Pejman Roozbeh wrote the game's soundtrack. The four of them had worked together on the music of the 2013 fangame Sonic: After the Sequel, and the 2017 action-platformer Spark the Electric Jester. Other artists featured on the soundtrack include composer Masahiro Aoki, drummer Bruno Valverde of the band Angra, Midori Tatematsu of Lovebites, and electronic artist Roborob.

== Reception ==
Reception

Aggregate scores
Aggregator	Score
Metacritic	NS: 71/100; PC: 73/100; PS4: 70/100; XONE: 69/100
OpenCritic	47% recommend

Review scores
Publication	Score
GameSpot	7/10
Nintendo Life	6/10
Nintendo World Report	7.5/10
PC Gamer (US)	78/100
Push Square	6/10
Shacknews	4/10
The Guardian	2/5

No Straight Roads received "mixed or average" reviews according to review aggregator Metacritic. Fellow review aggregator OpenCritic assessed that the game received fair approval, being recommended by 47% of critics. The game was praised due to its music, design and characters, but it was criticized for its gameplay and glitches, especially for the Switch version. Forbes via Matt Gardner stated that the game was "one of the greatest games for 2020", citing its "funny story, stunning art direction, an incredible soundtrack, and the often-weird gameplay mechanics".

== Sequel ==
No Straight Roads 2
- Developer: Metronomik
- Directors: Wan Hazmer; Daim Dziauddin
- Composers: James Landino; Falk Au Yeong; Garrett Williamson; Midas Klare
- Engine: Unreal Engine 5
- Platform: Windows, multi-platform
- Release: TBA 2026
- Genre: Action-adventure
- Mode: Co-op mode; single-player

No Straight Roads 2 was revealed in 2025 and is set to release later in 2026. The game adds a new playable character, the keyboardist Casey, who tags along with Mayday and Zuke in the story. Bunk Bed Junction sets out to different cities to gather pieces of the Grand Qwasa after it combusts.
