= Suicide of Charlotte Fosgate =

2025 suicide of American teenager

On May 2, 2025, American teenager Charlotte Fosgate drowned herself. Fosgate, who was transgender, was reported missing three days later. After recovering her body from the Willamette River on May 10, officials confirmed Fosgate's death on May 31. Before Fosgate jumped, she posted a photo of her view from the St. Johns Bridge to her X account with the caption "its a pretty view". Fosgate's death was met with expressions of mockery from some users on X, which was combatted by others through memorial pages and comments expressing condolences.

== Background ==
Charlotte Fosgate, aged 17 at death, was born in Kansas City, Missouri, and lived in Oak Grove, Oregon. Fosgate was trans and struggled with mental health issues. After being subject to bullying at her school, she transferred to virtual learning. She intended to pursue a career in the computer industry. Fosgate was a member of the online Sonic the Hedgehog fandom, and had over 18 thousand followers on social media platform X under the name "burntfishie".

== Disappearance and death ==
Fosgate left her mother's house on May 2, 2025, and was last seen the day before. She was reported missing on May 4. The sheriff's office in her area expressed concerns that she could be a danger to herself.

Fosgate posted a picture on X from the top of the St. Johns Bridge at 1:39 am, with the caption "its a pretty view", followed by the comment "long way down" a few minutes later. She then jumped from the bridge and drowned.

The search for Fosgate was later extended to searching around the St. Johns Bridge. Her body was recovered from the Willamette River on May 10. The medical examiners' office publicly confirmed Fosgate's death on May 31, and determined the cause of death to be suicide.

== Reactions ==
Following the announcement of Fosgate's death, users on X misgendered Fosgate and celebrated her death. Julia Silverman of The Oregonian described the comments made under Fosgate's last social media posts as "ghoulishly gleeful". Fosgate's final X post has over 134 million views, 130 thousand likes, and 12 thousand replies as of November 2026.

To combat the mockery Fosgate's death received online, some users on platforms such as X commented condolences under her posts. Many of these users were trans or allies. A Facebook page that was initially created to help find her was repurposed to memorialize her. Fosgate was included in vigils in Pullman, Washington, and Moscow, Idaho, held for suicides of trans people in the US since October 2024.
