= List of unofficial Sonic the Hedgehog media =

List of unofficial media based on Sonic the Hedgehog

Unlicensed developers and fans have created unofficial media, especially video games, relating to the Sonic the Hedgehog franchise. These products include video games, video game mods, ROM hacks, comics, and animations. They are part of the wider Sonic fandom.

Due to the popularity of the franchise, some of these products have received media attention. Sega is permissive of most fangames, as long as they are not for profit. Some Sonic fan game developers have gone on to work on official Sonic content, most prominently Sonic Mania (2017), while others have subsequently created original games that feature Sonic-inspired mechanics.

== Video games ==
=== Fan games ===
The following are all original games based on the Sonic series:

- Green Hill Paradise Act 2 is a 3D Sonic game built by Daniel "SuperSonic68" Coyle and other collaborators with the 3D Sonic Games Development Kit. This game gained notability for receiving a positive response from Sega.
- Sonic Utopia is 3D Sonic game demo, which demonstrates 3D Sonic gameplay in a large open world.
- Sonic Before the Sequel is a 2D Sonic game created by Felipe "LakeFeperd" Daneluz, set in between the events of Sonic the Hedgehog and Sonic the Hedgehog 2. The game's original release in 2011 had a soundtrack with reused music coming from different video game franchises like Kirby, but a second release in 2013 came with original music specifically for the game. The game received wide critical praise for its faithfulness to earlier titles. Two sequels, Sonic After the Sequel and Sonic Chrono Adventure, were later developed and released in 2013, the latter incorporating Metroidvania and time travel elements. Daneluz would later develop an original platform series with Sonic-inspired mechanics, Spark the Electric Jester.
- Sonic Dreams Collection is a parody game by Arcane Kids presented as a Dreamcast development kit containing cancelled Sonic games. The game caught media attention for its bizarre nature and its intent to lampoon the Sonic fandom.
- Sonic Fan Remix is a 2.5D Sonic game created in Unity that features reimagined levels from past Sonic games.
- Retro Sonic is a 2D Sonic game created by Christian Whitehead. It is the first game to use the Retro Engine (the engine used for the 2011 remaster of Sonic CD), and later merged with two other Sonic fangames, Sonic Nexus and Sonic XG, to form Retro Sonic Nexus, a collaboration project led by Whitehead. Retro Sonic Nexus was ultimately cancelled in 2011, splitting up the three projects, while Whitehead went on to work with Sega to develop remasters of early Sonic titles, later directing Sonic Mania.
- Sonic Robo Blast 2 is a 3D Sonic game that uses a modified version of the Doom Legacy engine and has been in development since 1998. The game gained notability for being the first 3D Sonic fangame, and it continues to be updated by its developers and supported by its community to the present day. A kart racing variant, Sonic Robo Blast 2 Kart, was released in November 2018 using the same engine; a sequel, Dr. Robotnik's Ring Racers, was released in 2024.
- Chao Resort Island is a fangame for Microsoft Windows and macOS, based upon the Chao-raising minigames in Sonic Adventure.
- Sonic World is a game heavily based upon the Sonic Adventure titles and Sonic Heroes. It features over 30 playable characters and the ability to make Heroes-style teams, as well as remastered levels from various Sonic games. An upgraded version called Sonic World DX received its first demo release in 2020, and remains in active development.
- Sonic Z-treme is a homebrew Sega Saturn game that aims to recreate concepts from the canceled game Sonic X-treme using original code. It can be made to run on real Saturn hardware if it is burned to a disc.
- Sonic the Hedgehog 2 HD is a high-definition fan remaster of Sonic the Hedgehog 2 in development. The final version is planned to feature additional stages and the ability to play levels as Knuckles the Echidna. Some previous members of the development team would go on to work on Sonic Mania.
- Sega Master System Brawl is a homebrew fighting game designed for Sega Genesis hardware. It is a platform fighter that features characters and arenas from several different Master System games, such as Sonic the Hedgehog, Alex Kidd in Miracle World, Kung Fu Kid, Dynamite Dux, and Vampire: Master of Darkness.
- Sonic Eclipse Online was a popular 3D Sonic game on the game creation platform Roblox. After the developer Arnold "DoctorRofatnik" Castillo had his account banned for accusations of sexually preying on a child, which were propagated by YouTuber Ruben Sim, Castillo transferred the game to a friend's account and continued profiting from it. Roblox refused to take the game down as they did not view it as a safety concern. Later, after being notified, Sega had the game taken down via a copyright infringement notice. (Castillo was later sentenced to 15 years in prison for transporting another child across interstate lines for sex.) The case was used by People Make Games and Bloomberg Businessweek to accuse Roblox of practices compromising child safety.
- Sonic Smackdown is a 2D Sonic fighting game developed by ArcForged. The game features 17 playable characters and 1-on-1 battles with similar mechanics to games like Marvel vs. Capcom. The game has seen play in several fighting game community tournaments. An updated version, Ultimate Sonic Smackdown, is currently in development and adds tag team mechanics with support for teams of up to 3 characters.
- Sonic Omens is an episodic 3D Sonic game that garnered controversy regarding its funding through Patreon. Discourse surrounding the project led Sonic social media manager Katie Chrzanowski to clarify via Twitter that "So long as no profit is involved, there is usually no issue with y'all using our blue boy to hone your art and dev skills – but, for legal reasons, I can't promise all content is OK".
- Sonic GT is a finished 3D Sonic game built on the fan-made Bumper Engine. It iterates on gameplay elements from the series' official 3D entries. The creator would later refine many of the game's mechanics for an original project, Rollin' Rascal, which was crowdfunded via Kickstarter in 2024.
- Sonic 3D in 2D is a reimagining of Sonic 3D Blast as a classic-style 2D Sonic game. Unlike the original, Tails and Knuckles are included as playable characters and retain their abilities from the classic titles.
- Virtua Sonic is a 3D Sonic virtual reality game built on the base of Sonic GT. The player takes control of Sonic from a first-person perspective and must pump their arms in the air to accelerate forward. Additional speed can be acquired by taking advantage of the game's level terrain. It debuted at the 2020 Sonic Amateur Games Expo and supports SteamVR-compatible headsets.
- Sonic and the Fallen Star is a 2D Sonic game featuring original levels and music. It is inspired by multiple 2D Sonic titles, Sonic Heroes, and the Before the Sequel and After the Sequel fangames. A sequel, Sonic and the Moon Facility, was announced in 2023, but later cancelled in February 2024, with an unfinished demo published online in February 2025.
- Sonic Time Twisted is a 2D Sonic game in the style of the 16-bit titles, mostly following that of Sonic the Hedgehog 3 and Sonic CD. It includes multiple playable characters, original levels, and time travel elements.
- Sonic.EXE - The Game is a 2D Sonic horror game made in GameMaker. A playable adaptation of the 2011 creepypasta Sonic.exe, the game went viral after YouTuber PewDiePie uploaded a Let's Play of the game onto YouTube, consequently driving new attention to the source material.
- Sonic Galactic is an upcoming 2D Sonic game and imagining of a Sonic game on the Sega Saturn. The demos of the game have been well-received, often being compared to Sonic Mania. The game features Sonic, Tails, Knuckles, Fang the Sniper, and a new character: Tunnel the Mole, as playable characters, alongside new levels and mechanics.
- Sonic the Hedgehog RPG (also known as Sonic SatAM RPG), is a 2D episodic role-playing Sonic game made in Love2D by a team led by Reggie "RedG" Meisler. The game is set in the universe of the 1993 Sonic the Hedgehog animated series. As of 2026, five episodes have been released. Sixth episode is in development.
- Sanic 06 is a virtual reality game for the Oculus Rift created by indie developer AjDaLolma, creating it using the Unity game engine in six weeks. Released in 2014, the game consists of rooms containing various deformed 3D models of Sonic characters who play voice clips when approached, described by Zolani Stewart of Kotaku as "spanning between the humanoid, the odd-legged creature, the gross monstrous depiction and the non-applicable."
- Sanic Ball is a racing game involving rolling in a ball at high speeds, where the balls are designed to resemble various Sonic characters including Sanic, Sulvur (Silver the Hedgehog), Dr. Aggmen (Doctor Eggman), and Shrek. The game was played during AGDQ 2019's "Sonic Block".

=== Unofficial ports ===
The following are unofficial ports and remakes of Sonic games for various systems:

- Somari is a pirated version of Sonic the Hedgehog released for the Nintendo Entertainment System in 1994. However, rather than starring Sonic, the game features a character named "Somari", who is essentially Nintendo's mascot Mario wearing Miles "Tails" Prower's shoes and using Sonic's movesets. There are many other versions of this game with different titles, characters and level order, with some featuring Sonic as a playable character in place of Somari. Years later, a fan developed a ROM hack of the original Sonic the Hedgehog based on Somari.
- Sonic 3: Angel Island Revisited (also called Sonic 3 A.I.R.) is a port of Sonic 3 & Knuckles to PC and mobile devices based on the ROM file for the original Genesis release. The port was first released in 2019.
- Sonic 1 SMS Remake and Sonic 2 SMS Remake are unofficial remakes of the 8-bit Sonic the Hedgehog and Sonic the Hedgehog 2 Master System games, released in 2019 and 2020 respectively for Microsoft Windows and Android. The remakes feature widescreen gameplay and add new playable characters, levels, and game mechanics from other Sonic games.
- A Commodore 64 port of the 8-bit Sonic the Hedgehog was released on December 21, 2021. It is the first game to require the REU expansion cartridge, due to the game's intensive design for the C64 base hardware.
- Sonic Chaos is an unofficial remake of the 8-bit 1993 game of the same name. It features Sonic Mania-style gameplay elements, sprites and graphics, as well as new game mechanics and boss fights. The remake is in development.
- Sonic P-06 is an unofficial remake of Sonic the Hedgehog (2006) for Windows powered by Unity. It is in development and has released several demos.
- Zippy the Porcupine is an Atari 2600 demake of the original Sonic the Hedgehog.
- A tech demo based on the 16-bit version of Sonic the Hedgehog was created for the Super Nintendo Entertainment System, featuring the third act of Green Hill Zone. The demo was developed with the original game's code optimized for and playable on Super NES hardware.
- Sonic Triple Trouble 16-Bit is an unofficial remake of the titular Game Gear game for Windows, released in 2022 created by Noah N. Copeland. Proposed as a theoretical successor to Sonic 3 & Knuckles for home consoles, the remake features similar gameplay, graphics, and sound to that of official 16-bit Sonic games. Other additions include updated level design and the ability to switch between Sonic and Tails in real time.
- Unleashed Recompiled is an unofficial PC port of Sonic Unleashed, released in March 2025 from a team led by Skyth, known for making mods of Sonic Generations. It features numerous built-in enhancements such as support for higher resolutions and frame rates, as well as an easy-to-use installer and built-in achievements. Users are required to supply their own copy of the Xbox 360 version of the game and its downloadable content, which can be transferred from an unmodified console to a PC.

=== Mods and ROM hacks ===
The following are some of the modified versions of existing Sonic games, created using special programs and utilities.

- Unleashed Project is a mod of Sonic Generations developed by Team Unleashed, consisting of modders Dario FF, S0LV0, ChimeraReiax, and MilesGBOY, that ports most of the daytime stages from Sonic Unleashed. The mod additionally features new textures and shading techniques designed to mimic those featured in Sonic Unleashed, and a revamped hub world.
- Sonic the Hedgehog Megamix is a total conversion mod of Sonic the Hedgehog developed by Team Megamix. The modified game features redesigned levels and multiple playable characters, each with unique abilities. Originally created on Sega Genesis hardware, Sonic the Hedgehog Megamix was eventually moved to the Sega CD in order to take advantage of the system's improved storage and CD audio capabilities.
- Super Mario Generations is a mod of Sonic Generations developed by Daku Neko that replaces characters with those from the Mario series, and alters some of the sound and graphical effects of the game to make it more close to that of Mario. It is notable for making an appearance in the modding section of Guinness World Records 2017: Gamer's Edition.
- Motobug the Badnik in Sonic the Hedgehog is a hack of Sonic the Hedgehog that replaces Sonic with a Motobug, as well as altered stage design in a few levels. The programmer, Cody "Polygon Jim" Lawrence, died in 2013; the Motobug that Heavy Rider rides in Sonic Mania was later named "Jimmy" and given a similar jumping animation as a tribute.
- Knuckles in Sonic 1 is a hack of Sonic the Hedgehog created by Simon "Stealth" Thomley which replaces Sonic with Knuckles the Echidna, complete with his moveset and sprites from Sonic & Knuckles. Thomley would later assist with development on Sonic Mania and the Retro Engine ports of the Genesis Sonic trilogy.
- Sonic 1 Boomed is a hack of Sonic the Hedgehog that implements Sonic's redesign from the Sonic Boom animated series, and adds numerous voice clips for Sonic and Dr. Eggman that play throughout the game, such as when the player jumps or collects rings.
- Sonic 2 XL is a hack of Sonic the Hedgehog 2 that replaces the game's golden rings with onion rings that cause Sonic to become morbidly obese when he collects them, noticeably slowing him down and hindering his jump and ability to Spin Dash. If Sonic gets too obese, he'll lose a life, but he'll lose weight over time by simply running for a while, and hitting ? monitors will instantly remove all his body fat. The primary challenge of the hack is to collect as few rings as possible.
- The S Factor: Sonia and Silver is a work-in-progress multi-level hack of Sonic the Hedgehog which centers around Sonia the Hedgehog, Sonic's sister who appeared in the TV series Sonic Underground, and Silver the Hedgehog, a time-traveling, psychokinetic hedgehog who first appeared in 2006's Sonic the Hedgehog, who each have unique abilities. Scourge the Hedgehog from Archie Comics' Sonic the Hedgehog comic series can also be unlocked.
- Yoshi in Sonic the Hedgehog 2 is a hack of Sonic the Hedgehog 2 that replaces Sonic with Yoshi, complete with his abilities from Yoshi's Island.
- Sonic 2 Long Version is a hack of Sonic the Hedgehog 2 that attempts to restore the scrapped levels from the original game's development cycle, such as Sand Shower (or Dust Hill), Genocide City (or Cyber City) and Hidden Palace.
- An unofficial Hebrew translation of the original Sonic the Hedgehog was released by Barashka in 2017.
- Sonic 3D Blast: Director's Cut is a hack of Sonic 3D Blast (Genesis) released by the game's lead programmer, Jon Burton, in 2017. It features improved controls and gameplay additions not seen in the original version, such as a level editor, a password save system, time attack challenges, and the ability to transform into Super Sonic.
- Smash Remix is a ROM hack of the 1999 Nintendo 64 fighting game Super Smash Bros. It retains the gameplay style of the original release while adding new gameplay modes, stages, and characters. An update to the mod in February 2022 added Sonic and Super Sonic as playable characters, along with Sonic the Hedgehog-themed stages and music.
- The Akaneia Build is a ROM hack of the 2001 GameCube fighting game Super Smash Bros. Melee. Among others, the mod adds Sonic and Tails as playable characters, in reference to a well-known April Fools joke from the April 2002 issue of Electronic Gaming Monthly.
- Sonic the Hedgehog 4 (not to be confused with the official Sonic 4) is an unlicensed Super NES game and a ROM hack of Speedy Gonzales: Los Gatos Bandidos (1995). Featuring Sonic in place of the eponymous character, the player can collect rings and free Nintendo's Mario (replacing the mice from the original game) from an assortment of cages.
- Originally exclusive to the Wii U, Sonic Lost World's Yoshi and Zelda-themed DLCs were recreated in the game's PC version as mods.
- Sonic Generations First Person Mod is a mod of Sonic Generations created by Twitter user Skyth that puts people in the POV of Sonic with no camera stabilization. The mod was released in a tweet, saying "POV: you're sonic", and "warning: this video is going to badly hurt your eyes", and to also play at the user's own risk, due to the mod majorly being vomit inducing.
- SM64 Generations (not to be confused with Super Mario Generations (see above)) is a mod of Sonic Generations. Players take control of Mario in place of Sonic, accompanied by his 3D model, movesets, and physics from Super Mario 64. The differences between Sonic and Mario's gameplay results in some levels becoming extremely difficult or impossible to complete.
- Hellfire Saga is a hack of Sonic 3 & Knuckles created by Red Miso Studios. The hack features a new campaign where Sonic battles monsters, demons, and other hellish foes as he tries to escape to his home world. The hack is heavily inspired by games such as Castlevania and Ghosts and Goblins, and uses many elements from its games, such as bosses, music, and art. The hack was in development for five years, and was released on January 30, 2023.
- Sonic Forces Overclocked is a mod of Sonic Forces that includes new levels, voiced cutscenes, and a storyline set after the original game.
- Shadow the Hedgehog: Reloaded is a mod of Shadow the Hedgehog that restores music, dialogue and art cut from the original release, and makes numerous gameplay changes, which include modifications to certain gameplay mechanics as well as lowering the completion requirements of some of the game's missions.
- An Ordinary Sonic ROM Hack is a hack of Sonic the Hedgehog created by Cinossu in 2013, inspired by the 2011 creepypasta Sonic.exe. During gameplay, the stage infrequently shifts to a demonic world at certain intervals, in which the player is slowly pursued by Sonic.exe. The player must find an item box to restore the world to normal and finish the level before Sonic.exe catches and kills them.
- Sonic the Hedgehog (2006): Legacy of Solaris is a mod of the Xbox 360 version of Sonic the Hedgehog (2006) developed by "JotaroPowered" and the Lost Legacy Team, a collection of Sonic the Hedgehog (2006) modders. It makes numerous changes to the gameplay, including reimplementing unused concepts and content removed from the original game, adjusting the game's physics to be closer to those in Sonic Adventure, tweaking character abilities and level designs, and adding re-imaginings of DLC content that were planned to be released, but were not.
- Sanic the Hegeheg in: Breath of the Wild is a mod of The Legend of Zelda: Breath of the Wild that replaces Link with Sanic.
- Sonic 3 Unlocked is a mod of Sonic 3 & Knuckles developed by Lillian that adds Amy Rose, Mighty the Armadillo, and Ray the Flying Squirrel as playable characters, implements Mania Plus's Encore Mode, etc.

== Series and films ==
- Super Mario Bros. Z (2006–2012; 2016–present) is an online crossover sprite animation series created by Mark Haynes for Newgrounds, which starred Mario and Sonic the Hedgehog characters in a plot based on Dragon Ball Z. The series was later remade beginning in 2015; however, Nintendo took down the series' Patreon account. The series is referenced in the official comic miniseries Sonic the Hedgehog: Scrapnik Island, in which Mecha Sonic quotes a line from his SMBZ counterpart.
- Sonic in JAWS is a 2009 comedic short film produced by BalenaProductions, which was animated in Garry's Mod. The film itself is a short remake of the 1975 film, Jaws, with Sonic and Tails in the roles of Martin Brody and Matt Hooper respectively, and Conker the Squirrel in the role of Quint. In 2011, it subsequently got remade and remastered in HD.
- Sonic is a live-action/animated 2013 short film written and directed by filmmaker Eddie Lebron and produced by Blue Core Studios, intended to be a prequel to the original video game. Jaleel White, who provided Sonic's voice for DIC Entertainment's cartoons, reprised his role, and numerous internet personalities make appearances. At the time, Lebron hoped that the film would lead to a deal with Sega for an official feature-length Sonic film. Yuji Naka, co-creator of the series, called the film "awesome".
- SnapCube's Real-Time Fandub is an improvisational comedy gag dub (a deliberately inaccurate dub) series by the YouTube channel SnapCube, which is run by Penny Parker. The series has dubbed the cutscenes of Sonic Adventure 2, Sonic the Hedgehog (2006), Sonic Riders, Sonic Riders: Zero Gravity, and Shadow the Hedgehog; those dubs and their jokes have become popular online.
- Sea3on is an upcoming fan-made continuation of the Sonic the Hedgehog (SatAM) animated television series, basing the plotlines on both Ben Hurst's original notes as well as the group's active webcomic. Ron Myrick, the executive producer of SatAM's second season, is involved, while Johnny Gioeli of Crush 40 performed the theme song of the original series for this project.
- Sonic and Tails R is an audio drama series created by Emi Jones (EmuEmi), who also voices Tails within it, and Doryan Nelson. Several past voice actors from the Sonic games reprise their roles, including Ryan Drummond and Mike Pollock as Sonic and Dr. Eggman respectively.
- "Top 10 Hottest Female Sonic Characters" is a video posted on YouTube by Guptill89. The video features the uploader ranking female Sonic characters by their physical attractiveness. Brian Feldman, writing for Intelligencer described the video as "enthusiastic, medium-creepy," and poorly-written.
- Sonic the Hedgehog: The 2019 Cut is an upcoming fan edit of the film Sonic the Hedgehog that uses the original design of Sonic that caused backlash and subsequently the film's delay.

== Comics ==
- Sonic the Comic Online is an unofficial webcomic continuation of Sonic the Comic. It was received positively by the alumni staff, such as Nigel Kitching, Roberto Corona and Andy Diggle. Kitching and STC artist Nigel Dobbyn collaborated on an epilogue story for the series in 2018.
- Archie Sonic Online is an unofficial webcomic continuation of Archie Comics' Sonic the Hedgehog series, which starts from where the pre-reboot continuity left off.
- Archie Sonic Restored is a fan continuation post-reboot Sonic the Hedgehog from Archie Comics. Its primary goal for now is the unfinished post-reboot issues of Archie Comics' Sonic the Hedgehog series, which were scrapped when Sega and Archie Comics cut ties with each other, and then starting its own stories of post-reboot continuity .

== Fansites ==
- TSSZ News was a Sonic-focused news website founded in 1999. The website was shut down in 2020 by its owner after posting a controversial tweet that compared the events of certain Sonic games' plots to the Black Lives Matter movement.
- Sonic Amateur Games Expo, known as SAGE for short, is an online event hosted by the website Sonic Fan Games HQ. The event spotlights Sonic fangames and original indie games in development. First held in 2000, the event has been held annually since 2005.

== Tabletop games ==
- Sonic Tag-Team Heroes is a Sonic tabletop role-playing game. Rowan Zeoli of Polygon described it as a "more traditional tabletop game with crunchy, Dungeons & Dragons-inspired grid-based combat".
- Rings and Running Shoes is a Sonic tabletop role-playing game that uses the Powered by the Apocalypse framework.
