= Sonic P-06 =

Platform video game

Sonic the Hedgehog: Project '06
- Box art mockup by ChaosX
- Developer: ChaosX
- Publisher: ChaosX
- Series: Sonic the Hedgehog (unofficial port)
- Engine: Unity
- Platform: Windows
- Genres: Action-adventure, platform, beat 'em up

Sonic the Hedgehog: Project '06, or simply Sonic P-06, is a platform game developed by Argentine programmer Ian "ChaosX" Moris for Microsoft Windows. It is an unofficial remake of the 2006 video game Sonic the Hedgehog, originally developed by Sonic Team and published by Sega.

As the original game is infamous for its poor quality, the PC port aimed to fix its issues, as well as restore content scrapped during development. The project had five demos released, with each demo getting a bug-fix patch that would address certain issues, while also adding more quality of life improvements, based on fan feedback.

== Gameplay ==
Project '06, a remake of the 2006 video game Sonic the Hedgehog, is a 3D platformer. As of Release 5, the game features all nine playable characters: Sonic the Hedgehog, Shadow the Hedgehog, Silver the Hedgehog, Miles "Tails" Prower, Knuckles the Echidna, Rouge the Bat, E-123 Omega, Blaze the Cat, and Amy Rose.

Although a faithful recreation, Project '06 features various changes designed to improve the experience. The time spent on loading screens has been significantly reduced. The graphics are more detailed and the game uses different color grading. Character attributes have been altered: for example, Sonic and Silver now move faster, while Tails and Knuckles' moves from Sonic Adventure (1998) and Sonic Adventure 2 (2001) have been reintroduced. Players can also choose between various cosmetic options, for example, make Sonic's animations resemble those from a 2005 prerelease showing. While Project '06 is planned to include all of the original game's stages and boss battles, including those that were originally downloadable content, the game's hub worlds and story modes will not be included in the final release.

== Development ==
=== Background ===
Sonic the Hedgehog (commonly referred to as Sonic '06) is a 2006 platform game developed by Sonic Team and published by Sega for the Xbox 360 and PlayStation 3. It was intended to be a reboot of the Sonic franchise, with a more realistic setting than previous games. The game faced serious problems that forced Sonic Team to rush development. Because of it, the game received negative reviews upon release for its story, controls, camera, bugs, and long load times. According to Engadget: "Many consider Sonic '06 to be the lowest point in the franchise... Most Sonic fans want to forget the game was ever released."

The game was never released on Windows personal computers, so some Sonic fans have made unofficial efforts to develop a port. Beginning in 2015, a group led by developers Gistix and Mefiresu worked on a port of Sonic the Hedgehog using the Unity game engine, and released a number of demos between 2017 and 2018. Although development on the project has continued, progress has slowed, and Gistix is no longer involved. In December 2020, Mefiresu announced that the project was cancelled.

=== Production ===
Project '06 is being developed by Argentine programmer Ian "ChaosX" Moris. Moris had been a Sonic fan since childhood, when he received a Sega Genesis with a copy of the original Sonic the Hedgehog (1991). He played through the Genesis Sonic library. When he got a PlayStation 2 (PS2) in 2010, he played its Sonic releases, as he was "addicted to Sonic the Hedgehog and gaming overall by that point," and when he got a computer, he played more Sonic titles like the Sonic Adventure games. It was after getting the computer that Moris learned of the 2006 game, and it immediately fascinated him. "Its advertisements, atmosphere, tone and sound, CGI, graphics... everything resonated with me... It grabbed my attention like crazy." Moris unsuccessfully attempted to get a copy of the game despite being aware it had been poorly received; this did not matter to him.

It was during this time that Moris began to dabble in game development, having learned of the Sonic fangame community. He began working in Blitz3D before switching to Unity in 2014. His first project in Unity was the World Adventure Project, an effort to port the 2008 game Sonic Unleashed—which, similar to the 2006 game, he had no way of playing—to Windows. He abandoned the World Adventure Project after realizing he had the ability to remake Sonic the Hedgehog in Unity and thus be able to experience it, despite the low quality of his computer setup. He also saw the opportunity to fix its problems and restore content that had been scrapped during development, "[giving] it a second chance." Although he had never played the game, Moris, from analyzing gameplay footage, had a strong sense of what he needed to recreate. He made a folder housing gigabytes of reference material, including footage from both prerelease and post-release.

Moris started with the few pieces of the original code that are accessible, and began by remaking each level while ignoring or hiding the problems that are present in the official game. However, he has had to develop much of P-06 from scratch, such as the animations, textures, shaders, and typefaces, and gathered some assets from Unity. Moris recruited numerous individuals to help development. Scottish developer "Gotta Play Fast" used Autodesk 3ds Max to combine the separate model files for Sonic so he would work better in Unity, while "Beatz" assisted in creating textures, model rigging, and polishing collision detection. Other contributors include "JeraCyclo Gaming", "DaGuAr", "Volcano the Bat", "WizGenesis", "Giygas", "Acro", "LuRodSil", "NonamiEight", "Hero", "Sajid", "LuRodSil", "HyperBE32", "Knuxfan24", Thomas James Baker, and "BrianuuuSonic". Dialogue restoration, editing and script rearrangements were handled by Lost Impact Productions. Many contributors consider their work minor, as much of the actual development is handled by Moris.

== Release ==
Moris released the first demo of Project '06—containing two levels, "Wave Ocean" and "Kingdom Valley"—in April 2019. An update containing bug fixes, improved widescreen support, and other minor improvements, was released the following month. The second demo, which added the three levels; "Dusty Desert", "Flame Core", and "Radical Train", was released in October 2019, and a bug-fix update was released in November. Following the November update, Moris took a break to focus on other projects. He is unsure when the remake will be complete: "A wild guess would probably be in two years, but I'm very unsure about that." A third demo was released in July 2020 which added the rest of the stages in Sonic's story, followed by an update in August 2020 that addressed numerous bugs in the previous build. After the August build, Moris took a break from the project to work on another fangame, Sonic Riders Overdrive. A fourth demo was released in September 2021 that added Shadow and all of his campaign levels, followed by a bugfix update later that month. The fifth and latest demo, which added all of Silver's stages to the game, was released on April 19, 2023.

== Reception ==
Reviewing the first demo, Nathan Grayson of Kotaku wrote that while Project '06 still suffered from flaws such as poor level design, it was "already a marked improvement" over the original game, with fewer glitches and a better feel. Nick Summers of Engadget called Project '06 a "remarkable feat" and said it demonstrated that Sonic remained culturally relevant despite poorly received games.

== See also ==
- List of unofficial Sonic the Hedgehog media
