= Sonic Galactic =

Upcoming fan-made video game

- Developer: Starteam
- Publisher: Starteam
- Series: Sonic the Hedgehog (unofficial)
- Platforms: Windows, macOS
- Genre: Platform
- Modes: Single-player, multiplayer

Sonic Galactic is an upcoming platform game developed and published by Starteam. It is a fan game based on Sega's Sonic the Hedgehog franchise and an imagining of a 32-bit Sonic game released for the Sega Saturn. As one of five player characters, Sonic, Tails, Knuckles, Fang, and an original character named Tunnel the Mole, the player traverses through levels in the same manner as 2D games from the official Sonic series, with the aim of stopping Doctor Eggman's schemes on the mysterious Illusion Island.

Two demos for Sonic Galactic have been released, the first of which in 2020 and the second in 2025, and both have been positively received by critics.

== Gameplay ==
Sonic the Hedgehog running in the first act of the first zone, Verdant Isle Zone.

Sonic Galactic is a 2D side-scrolling platformer structured into a series of zones along with an optional tutorial. The player can control one of five characters: Sonic, Tails, Knuckles, Fang and the original character Tunnel, each with distinct abilities. Sonic retains his abilities from previous 2D Sonic games, with the addition of a wall kick. Tails retains his ability to fly for a short time by spinning his twin tails like a helicopter rotor, while also being able to cancel his flight mid-air. Knuckles retains his ability to glide, climb walls, and a new addition, being able to grab all momentum into his glide. Fang can use his popgun to shoot himself upwards in air. Tunnel can dig into the ground and or walls and launch himself out of them.

Each zone consists of two acts. The first act of each level ends with a miniboss, while the second act ends with a regular boss fight. The game contains the same roster of elemental power-ups from previous Sonic games, with some new ones being added. Similarly to Sonic the Hedgehog 3 (1994), there are giant rings hidden around zones which lead to 3D special stages where the player can attempt to collect a Galactic Gem. Like in Sonic the Hedgehog 2 (1992), the objective is to collect a certain number of rings within a time limit.

== Plot ==
The original character Tunnel the Mole

After the events of Sonic & Knuckles and Sonic the Hedgehog: Triple Trouble, Doctor Eggman, in desperate search to restore his virtually destroyed army, detects an energy reading from an uncharted location, Illusion Island, which had randomly reappeared. Upon research, he finds that a meteor that had crashed there eons ago contained tons of energy; he heads to the mysterious island to harness the energy.

Sonic, Tails, Knuckles and Fang, after hearing rumors, follow suit to see what Eggman is up to. At the island, they meet Tunnel, an anthropomorphic mole native to Illusion Island, who joins forces with the group. To nullify Eggman's power, they search for the seven Galactic Gems that are scattered across the island.

== Release ==
Sonic Galactic was first released in 2020 as a demo, following its reveal at Sonic Amateur Games Expo. Five years later, a second demo was released on January 1, 2025.

== Reception ==
=== Pre-release ===
The demos for Sonic Galactic have received positive reception, often favorably compared to Sonic Mania (2017). Game Rant notes, "while it's currently only available as a demo, it's already gaining acclaim." Digital Foundry's John Linneman stated that the game is "obscenely well made" and "it could stand as an official Sega product when complete," praising the quality, level design and mechanics. Two critics from Alpha Beta Gamer praised the levels and visuals; Calum Fraser reviewed the alpha version and positively compared it to Sonic Mania, and KJ Robertson wrote that the beta version is "as near a perfect Sonic game as you could ask for and another triumph for the Sonic fan game community."

== See also ==
- List of unofficial Sonic the Hedgehog media
