= Brent Cash =

- Born: June 9, 1967 (age 59)
- Origin: Athens, Georgia
- Genres: Sunshine pop acoustic soft rock
- Years active: 2008–present
- Label: Marina Records
- Website: http://www.brentcash.net

Brent Cash (born June 9, 1967) is a singer–songwriter from Athens, Georgia.

== Music career ==
Cash's musical career started as a drummer for several bands (including the Planets, the Michael Guthrie Band and Television Buzz), all the while recording his own pop music in his home on a four-track. He released two separate four-track recordings in the 1990s, "Muse Rapture" and "The Most Beautiful Girls In The World Have Unpronounceable Last Names," distributing cassette tapes to friends and acquaintances. In 2008, Cash decided to step up the production levels on his first full-length album, 2008's How Will I Know If I'm Awake.

Cash's second album How Strange It Seems was released in Europe on May 27, 2011, and was released worldwide on June 7, 2011.

Cash released his third album, The New High in January 2017, featuring Cash playing every instrument on the album except for the strings.

== Discography ==
=== How Will I Know If I'm Awake (2008) ===
How Will I Know If I'm Awake

Studio album by Brent Cash
- Released: March 4, 2008
- Genres: Sunshine pop acoustic
- Length: 34:51
- Label: Marina Records

Singles from How Will I Know If I'm Awake

Professional ratings
Review scores
Source	Rating
PopMatters	(8/10) link

How Will I Know If I'm Awake is Brent Cash's debut album, recorded with Andy Baker (Jucifer, Japancakes, The Mercury Program). The songs consists of beachy atmospheres of "I Think I’m Falling In Love" to the ballad "Love Is Burning Down Tonight", a duet with Amanda Kapouzos of Tin Cup Prophette that also features a small string orchestra. The album was released in 2008 on the Marina Records label, and garnered largely positive reviews as a throwback to 60s-era sunshine pop.

==== Track listing ====
No.	Title	Length
1.	"Everything That's Grey"	2:08
2.	"Digging The Fault Line"	3:47
3.	"I Think I'm Falling In Love"	2:28
4.	"Only Time"	2:52
5.	"And Had We Ever..."	2:08
6.	"When The World Stops Turning"	3:34
7.	"Love Is Burning Down Tonight"	4:02
8.	"Good Morning Sunshine"	3:03
9.	"This Sea, These Waves"	4:07
10.	"More Than Everything"	6:22

=== How Strange It Seems (2011) ===
How Strange It Seems

Studio album by Brent Cash
- Released: May 27, 2011
- Genres: Sunshine pop acoustic
- Length: 39:20
- Label: Marina Records

Singles from How Strange It Seems

How Strange It Seems is Brent Cash's second album, recorded with Joel Hatstat (of Joel Hatstat Audio). Like Cash's debut album, the songs consist of a wide variety of musical styles. The album was released in Europe on May 27, 2011, on the Marina Records label.The album was released in the U.S. on June 7, 2011.

==== Track listing ====
No.	Title	Length
1.	"I Wish I Were A Song"	5:34
2.	"It's Easier Without Her"	3:16
3.	"I Can't Love You Anymore Than I Do"	2:42
4.	"Just Like Today"	2:41
5.	"How Strange It Seems"	3:16
6.	"Where Do All The Raindrops Go?"	4:28
7.	"The Heart Will Always Work Alone"	3:26
8.	"I Must Tell You Now"	3:26
9.	"Don't Turn Your Back On The Stars"	4:35
10.	"I Just Can't Look Away"	6:46
11.	"I Wish I Were A Song (Epilogue)"	1:08

=== The New High (2017) ===
The New High

Studio album by Brent Cash
- Released: January 27, 2017
- Genres: Sunshine pop acoustic
- Length: TBA
- Label: Marina Records

The New High is Brent Cash's third album. Like the previous release, this album was recorded in Athens, Ga, with Joel Hatstat (of Joel Hatstat Audio). The album showcases Cash on vocals & all instruments except for the strings. The album was released on January 27, 2017.

==== Track listing ====
No.	Title	Length
1.	"The New High"	3:39
2.	"Out For Blood"	4:52
3.	"The Wrong Thing"	2:47
4.	"Every Inflection"	2:49
5.	"Dim Light"	4:02
6.	"The Way You Were"	4:15
7.	"I'm Looking Up"	2:50
8.	"Edge Of Autumn"	3:59
9.	"All In The Summer"	3:10
10.	"The Dusk Song"	2:06
11.	"Fade/Return"	4:17
12.	"Perfection Comes Near"	3:20

== Other songs ==
=== Games ===
- 2008: "Dear My Friend" – Ending theme of Sonic Unleashed.
