= Spark the Electric Jester 2 =

2019 video game

- Developer: Feperd Games
- Publisher: Feperd Games
- Designer: Felipe Daneluz
- Composers: James Landino; Falk Au Yeong; Paul Bethers; Andy Tunstall; Funk Fiction; Michael Staple
- Engine: Unity
- Platforms: Windows; Xbox One
- Release: Windows; May 16, 2019; Xbox One; September 7, 2020
- Genre: Platform
- Mode: Single-player

Spark the Electric Jester 2 (or simply Spark 2) is a 2019 platform game created by Brazilian indie developer Felipe Daneluz. It is a 3D sequel to Daneluz's previous 2D game Spark the Electric Jester, released in 2017. The player controls Spark's robotic counterpart, Fark, on his quest to find Doctor Armstrong. Fark must be guided through various levels and may engage enemies in combat. While fast-paced platforming is emphasized, levels are approachable in multiple ways.

Development of Spark 2 began after the first game's release. Daneluz utilized his own unofficial 3D Sonic the Hedgehog game engine in its creation. With the exception of music composition, the game was developed by him mostly alone. Spark 2 was released in May 2019 for Windows and in September 2020 for the Xbox One. Critics believed the game would appeal to players who enjoyed the Sonic Adventure titles and complimented its controls and level design. However, the combat elements and certain level sections were criticized. A third entry, Spark the Electric Jester 3, was released in August 2022.

== Gameplay ==
Fark engaging an enemy in combat

Departing from its 2D predecessor, Spark the Electric Jester 2 is a 3D platform game. The player controls Spark's robotic counterpart, Fark, through 14 different levels. Fark is capable of running on walls, ceilings, and through vertical loops. The levels, while emphasizing fast-paced platforming, are approachable in multiple ways. They are populated by enemies of varying strength, of which engagement is typically optional. Fark is able to attack and bounce off of smaller enemies by homing in on them, but must deal multiple attacks to defeat larger ones. A shield can be activated for a few seconds to parry enemy attacks and protect Fark from level hazards. The player can also pick up power-ups, altering Fark's design and giving him different combat abilities. Boss fights take place in arenas and revolve around parrying and reacting to attack cues.

For each level, two different medals can be earned measuring the player's score and time respectively. The player can also collect pieces of concept art in the levels.

== Plot ==
After the defeat of Freom, Fark is in the care of Doctor Armstrong. Wanting to learn Fark's real name, Armstrong prepares to examine his code but is abruptly kidnapped by a grey look-alike of Fark. Fark encounters the look-alike, E.J, at the outskirts of F.M City. E.J reveals he has hidden Armstrong somewhere and has orders from Freom to kill Fark. After defeating a mech under E.J's command, Fark runs into a robotic mage named Romalo. At his advice, Fark sets off for Technoria City in pursuit of E.J, with Romalo and a formie named Astra intending to observe him. Elsewhere, E.J reconvenes with a group of robot renegades, Flint, Double, and Float, who are also working with Freom to kill Fark.

Fark kills Float atop an abandoned castle and arrives at Technoria City. There, he is disrupted by a voice named Clarity. Introducing themselves as an artificial intelligence Armstrong created, Clarity pleads for Fark's help in stopping Freom. After defeating E.J, Fark encounters Flint, Double, and Freom. Freom reveals that Armstrong is dead and Fark's real name is Unit-2, being the creation of Freom (Unit-1). Fark subsequently defeats Double and later Flint, with the latter telling Fark not to trust Clarity.

E.J encounters Fark aboard a fleet of spaceships and denies killing Armstrong. E.J is then impaled by Astra, who engages Fark in battle as she suspects he plans to replace Freom. As Astra dies, she reveals herself to be a robot and an agent of Clarity to Romalo. Fark then encounters Freom inside a spacecraft, who tells him that Armstrong built Megaraph to create Clarity. Despite her intended purpose of protecting all life, Clarity plans to exterminate both people and robots. Freom intends to direct the spacecraft into the planet, causing a mass extinction that destroys Clarity and all life. Afterwards, he plans to rebuild the world for robots alongside Fark. Fark rejects Freom's offer and fights a remote body of Freom's. After their battle, Fark is told he is a copy of Freom's fundamental data, as Freom was incapable of transferring his own consciousness to a different body. Freom provokes Fark into transforming into a more powerful body at will, an ability Freom lacks, and tests him in one final fight. Fark then obliterates Freom's host body while Flint and Armstrong watch from the surface below.

== Development and release ==
Like the first Spark the Electric Jester game, Spark the Electric Jester 2 was created by Brazilian indie developer Felipe Daneluz. Development began after the 2017 release of its predecessor using Hedge Physics, an unofficial 3D Sonic the Hedgehog game engine made by Daneluz in Unity. He had begun to dabble in the creation of a 3D Sonic engine as he familiarized himself with Unity in college, believing that there were no similar publicly released engines at the time. Hedge Physics' release, assisted by programmer Héctor Barreiro-Cabrera, gave Daneluz the motivation to produce an original title utilizing the technology. Although a sequel to Spark the Electric Jester had not been planned, he chose to develop a game about Fark due to positive reception of the character. Daneluz also felt that fast-paced 3D platformers were scarce, in demand, and a type of game he wanted to create. Spark 2 was formally announced as Fark the Electric Jester on September 12, 2017, through a trailer published on Daneluz's YouTube channel. He decided on the final name of Spark the Electric Jester 2 because it was a direct sequel to the first game.

Daneluz felt that a problem with Spark the Electric Jester was that enemies could easily be bypassed. While believing this issue was worse in Spark 2, Daneluz tried to incentivize enemy engagement through various rewards and the scoring system, likening the latter to that of the Sonic Adventure games. Besides Sonic the Hedgehog, Spark 2 was influenced by the Kirby and Mega Man series, as well as Metal Gear Rising: Revengeance. Daneluz developed the game mostly alone, being responsible for its 3D models, textures, levels, and, with some assistance, programming. The soundtrack was composed by the same musicians as Spark the Electric Jester: James Landino, Falk Au Yeong, Paul Bethers, Andy Tunstall, Funk Fiction (Pejman Roozbeh), and Michael Staple. Tunstall in particular also designed Astra and created artwork used in the game's menus.

Spark 2 was released for Windows via Steam on May 16, 2019, and for the Xbox One on September 7, 2020. It was published under Daneluz’s developer name, Feperd Games. Daneluz submitted the game to Nintendo for a Nintendo Switch release but was turned down, which he speculated was because of his geographical location, Brazil.

== Reception ==
Destructoid's Dan Roemer and Rock Paper Shotgun's Dave Irwin believed that players who enjoyed the Sonic Adventure games would also find enjoyment in Spark 2. However, in a different Rock Paper Shotgun article penned by Dominic Tarason, he felt Spark 2 would elicit mixed reactions due to the divisive nature of 3D Sonic titles, and expressed hesitation in recommending it. Notwithstanding, he remarked that the controls were superior to those of the Adventure games, with Roemer also referring to them as "super tight and responsive". While Roemer believed the levels were open-ended and enabled experimentation, he found some of their layouts to be initially confusing, which he partially attributed to the camera system. Tarason thought of the levels as well-designed, making note of their large size and complex structures, but was occasionally confused.

Regarding the boss fights, Tarason disliked their emphasis on parrying and Roemer described them as "a bit samey". Roemer considered the combat to be the game's weakest aspect and argued that attacks lacked impact. Critics also experienced difficulty navigating through certain high-speed and vertical loop sections. Roemer and Irwin felt that comparable sections in 3D Sonic titles were less frustrating due to their reliance on scripting. In comparison to Spark the Electric Jester, Tarason thought Spark 2 suffered from an identity crisis but regarded it as enjoyable. Roemer also summarized the game as "a solid experience overall" but felt it was less polished than its predecessor.

== Sequel ==
Concurrent with Spark 2's Xbox One release was the announcement of Spark the Electric Jester 3. Similar to Spark 2, Spark 3 is a 3D platformer. The game was released on August 14, 2022, via Steam. Later that November, all of Spark 2's levels were made playable in Spark 3 through a free update. It was later released for the Nintendo Switch on July 25, 2024, in North America, and in Europe and Australia on August 1.
