= Spark the Electric Jester =

2017 video game

- Developer: Feperd Games
- Publisher: Feperd Games
- Designer: Felipe Daneluz
- Composers: Andy Tunstall; Falk Au Yeong; Funk Fiction; Michael Staple; Paul Bethers; James Landino
- Engine: Clickteam Fusion
- Platform: Windows
- Release: April 10, 2017
- Genre: Platform
- Mode: Single-player

Spark the Electric Jester is a 2017 platform game created by Brazilian indie developer Felipe Daneluz. The player controls Spark on his journey to stop a mobilizing army of robots from taking over the world. Gameplay involves a mix of fast-paced platforming and melee combat over a series of differently themed levels. A variety of power-ups are distributed throughout, each characterized by a unique set of abilities for use in battle and traversal.

Daneluz previously created several fangames based on the Sonic the Hedgehog series. Spark the Electric Jester was conceived from combining elements of the Sonic and Kirby series in one of his fangames, Sonic After the Sequel. He also drew inspiration from the Mega Man X, Bayonetta, and Super Smash Bros. series. Aside from sound and programming, development was handled primarily by Daneluz while in college. After a successful 2015 Kickstarter campaign, Spark the Electric Jester was released for Windows on April 10, 2017, as his first commercial title. Critics felt the game was successful at iterating on its 16-bit-era inspirations and directed praise towards its gameplay and soundtrack. A sequel, Spark the Electric Jester 2, was released in May 2019, followed by Spark the Electric Jester 3 in August 2022.

== Gameplay ==
Spark attacking an enemy with a hammer

Spark the Electric Jester is a side-scrolling platform game. The player must guide Spark through a series of differently themed levels containing an assortment of obstacles, robot enemies, and boss fights. Fast-paced gameplay is emphasized, as Spark is capable of running at high speeds. Running on inclines, walls, ceilings, and through vertical loops can affect his momentum. Spark can also wall jump and perform a dash to both accelerate forward and parry enemies. They are fought with melee attacks, of which three can be chained together into a combo. Additionally, the player is capable of releasing charged shots. Dealing attacks will prompt a blue meter, referred to as the "Static Bar", to rise. Once full, it can be expended by releasing a charged shot, enhanced with power. A variety of power-ups are distributed across the levels, each characterized by a unique move set and cosmetic change to Spark. They endow the player with different attacks, traversal abilities, or both. Some powers give the player a different special attack when the Static Bar is full.

Completing the game will unlock Fark, Spark's doppelgänger, as a playable character. Differences in his campaign include less health, altered level design, new boss fights, and a unique move set.

== Plot ==
After obtaining a job as a circus performer, Spark, an anthropomorphic character of the Formie species, was replaced with a robot bearing a close resemblance to himself. Spark overlooks his city in discontent, lamenting the increasing presence of robots in his society. As the robots abruptly begin to attack the people of the city, Spark intervenes to defeat them. He encounters his look-alike from the circus, who taunts him before running off, igniting a rivalry between the two. He dubs his look-alike "Fark", a portmanteau of "Spark" and "fake".

Spark travels across the planet to fight the mobilizing robot army, learning of their plans for world domination. On his journey, Spark is introduced to a small group of friendly robots and an engineer named Doctor Armstrong, who explains that he created an autonomous robot to guard Megaraph, a towering robot production facility. The robot, dubbing himself Freom, developed a dogmatic personality and amassed an army through the dissemination of a computer virus. Armstrong also discovered that Fark's intended purpose was to masquerade as an ally of Freom and eventually betray him, but he has been unsuccessful in doing so. Armstrong enlists Spark to infiltrate Freom's battle airships as well as Megaraph, where Spark can confront him.

After defeating Fark in a duel, Spark ascends up Megaraph and encounters Freom sitting atop a throne of machinery. Freom reveals his plan to launch the facility into the planet's orbital ring, bringing about a mass extinction. As Megaraph lifts off into space, Fark thrusts his staff into the sky to aid Spark from the surface. Brandishing the staff, Spark transforms into a more powerful form and pursues Freom up to Megaraph's peak. With his newfound strength, he is able to defeat Freom, finishing him with a massive laser attack and thwarting his plans.

== Development and release ==
The concept of Spark the Electric Jester originated from a power-up in Daneluz's Sonic After the Sequel (pictured).

Spark the Electric Jester was created by Brazilian indie developer Felipe Daneluz. He had previously immersed himself in Sonic the Hedgehog fangame development after having discovered the open-source game engine Sonic Worlds. The engine was developed by collaborators from the Sonic Fan Games HQ website for designing Sonic-style levels. Daneluz wanted to create a Sonic game since he was a child, and was able to familiarize himself with the engine due to its accessibility to those lacking programming experience. He used Multimedia Fusion 2 with Sonic Worlds to create three 2D Sonic fangames during his time as a game design student: Sonic Before the Sequel, Sonic After the Sequel, and Sonic Chrono Adventure. The games were released between 2011 and 2013 and were downloaded over 120,000 times.

The concept of Spark the Electric Jester originated from a power-up in After the Sequel. Based on the Beam power-up from the Kirby series, it gives Sonic a jester-like appearance and the ability to generate fireballs. Daneluz was curious as to what the design would look like as its own unique character, with additional inspiration being drawn from Ristar. He found that initial reactions to Spark's design were poor and attempted to redesign him, but concluded that he just needed to be refined by a different artist. Work on the game had begun by the time of Chrono Adventure's development. Daneluz intended for Spark the Electric Jester to be different from Sonic games, recounting the gameplay as initially slow, similar to Mega Man, and more mechanically simple than the final release. He found this early iteration to be boring and implemented Sonic elements, such as speed and vertical loops, as a result.

A month-long Kickstarter campaign was launched in late July 2015, accompanied by a demo containing three levels. The fundraiser earned over US$9,000 from the contribution of 440 backers, surpassing its funding goal of $7,000. Daneluz claimed that a "majority of the game's initial development" was complete by the campaign's launch and planned to allocate funds towards the sound design and soundtrack. The music was composed by Andy Tunstall, Falk Au Yeong, Funk Fiction (Pejman Roozbeh), and James Landino, all of whom had previously collaborated on Daneluz's fangames, as well as Michael Staple and Paul Bethers. Alongside music composition, Landino served as the audio lead and helped manage the musicians. Tunstall also served as a sound designer and drew the game's cover art. Otherwise, development was handled primarily by Daneluz while in college, with Héctor Barreiro-Cabrera being responsible for the base code. The game was also built atop Daneluz's code from his Sonic projects, initially in Multimedia Fusion 2 before later transitioning to Clickteam Fusion 2.5. Aside from the Sonic series, Spark the Electric Jester's biggest influences were Kirby Super Star and Mega Man X games, particularly ones in which Zero is playable. The Bayonetta and Super Smash Bros. series also served as inspiration. The character of Fark was inspired by rival characters from multiple video game series, such as Zero, Kirby's Meta Knight, and Sonic the Hedgehog's Metal Sonic and Shadow, while Freom was based on Dragon Ball's Frieza.

Spark the Electric Jester was originally projected for an early 2016 launch on Windows and OS X platforms, but would instead be released on April 10, 2017. It was published under Daneluz's developer name, Feperd Games, for Windows via Steam as his first commercial title. An update was released in the summer of 2018, introducing bug fixes and a rewritten story.

== Reception ==
Amr Al-Aaser of Rock Paper Shotgun and Jed Whitaker of Destructoid felt that Spark the Electric Jester was successful in incorporating and iterating on its 16-bit-era inspirations. Al-Aaser commended the game for its variety of ideas in both its power-ups and level mechanics, and opined that it would "remix and refresh old ideas with its own, instead of being content to pay homage". The power-ups were described as more in-depth than those in Sonic 3 & Knuckles by Whitaker, who accredited them towards elevating Spark the Electric Jester's quality to that of the 16-bit Sonic titles. While he characterized the first stage as "ugly" and "disjointed", Whitaker felt the game became better as he progressed, and summarized the level design as "great". Al-Aaser enjoyed Fark's mechanics and thought that the two characters' different gameplay styles complemented each other. Whitaker found Fark's campaign to be more difficult than Spark's, which he felt was lacking in challenge, and appreciated the game's amount of content. The soundtrack was positively received by both publications. It was described as feel-good and "an absolute jam" by Al-Aaser, and Whitaker believed it was of equal quality to the music found in 16-bit Sonic games.

== Sequels ==
A sequel, Spark the Electric Jester 2, was released for Windows via Steam in May 2019 and for the Xbox One in September 2020. Unlike its predecessor, the game features Fark as the protagonist and is a 3D platformer. A third entry, Spark the Electric Jester 3, was released via Steam in August 2022 and is similarly a 3D platformer. Spark the Electric Jester 3 was released for the Nintendo Switch on July 25, 2024, in North America, and in Europe and Australia on August 1, 2024.
