= Sonic the Hedgehog (2006 video game) =

Platform game by Sega

- Developer: Sonic Team
- Publisher: Sega
- Director: Shun Nakamura
- Producer: Masahiro Kumono
- Designers: Shun Nakamura; Atsushi Kanno
- Programmers: Yoshitaka Kawabata; Makoto Suzuki
- Artist: Akira Mikame
- Writers: Kiyoko Yoshimura; Shiro Maekawa
- Composers: Hideaki Kobayashi; Tomoya Ohtani; Mariko Nanba; Taihei Sato; Takahito Eguchi
- Series: Sonic the Hedgehog
- Platforms: Xbox 360; PlayStation 3
- Release: November 14, 2006: Xbox 360; NA: November 14, 2006; EU/AU: November 24, 2006; JP: December 21, 2006 PlayStation 3; JP: December 21, 2006; NA: January 30, 2007; EU/AU: March 23, 2007
- Genres: Platform, action-adventure
- Modes: Single-player, multiplayer

Sonic the Hedgehog, (Note: Japanese: ソニック・ザ・ヘッジホッグ, Hepburn: Sonikku za Hejjihoggu) commonly referred to as Sonic '06, is a 2006 platform game developed by Sonic Team and published by Sega. It was intended as a reboot of the Sonic franchise for seventh-generation video game consoles. Players control Sonic, Shadow, and the new character Silver as they seek to defeat Solaris, an ancient evil pursued by Doctor Eggman. Each character has his own campaign and abilities, and must complete levels, explore hub worlds and fight bosses to advance the story. In multiplayer modes, players can work cooperatively to collect Chaos Emeralds or race to the end of a level.

The development began in early 2005, led by Sonic co-creator Yuji Naka. Sonic Team sought to create a game in the vein of superhero films such as Batman Begins (2005), hoping it would advance the series with a realistic tone and multiple gameplay styles. While it received praise from video game journalists during pre-release showings, problems developed after Naka resigned to form his own company, Prope, and the team split to work on the Wii game Sonic and the Secret Rings (2007). Sonic Team rushed the later stages of development, cutting numerous features and scrapping plans for ports to the Wii and Windows.

Sega insisted on shipping Sonic the Hedgehog in time for the 2006 holiday shopping season and released it unfinished to coincide with the franchise's 15th anniversary. It was released for the Xbox 360 in November 2006 and PlayStation 3 that December, and received strongly negative reviews for its load times, camera, story, voice acting, glitches and controls. It is widely considered the worst Sonic game and severely damaged the franchise's reputation. In 2010, Sega delisted all Sonic games with below-average Metacritic scores to increase the value of the franchise, including Sonic the Hedgehog.

== Gameplay ==
Gameplay screenshot taken during the stage "Kingdom Valley", where Sonic is running at full speed

Sonic the Hedgehog is a 3D platformer with action-adventure and role-playing elements. Like Sonic Adventure (1998), the player navigates open-ended hub worlds where they can converse with townspeople and perform missions to advance the story. The main gameplay takes place in linear levels that become accessible as the game progresses. The main playable characters are three hedgehogs: Sonic, Shadow, and Silver, who feature in separate campaigns. A bonus campaign, which involves all three hedgehogs and concludes the storyline, is unlocked upon completing the first three.

Sonic's gameplay focuses on the speed-based platforming seen in previous Sonic games, with some sections having him run at full speed while dodging obstacles or riding a snowboard. Another character, Princess Elise, must be escorted in some stages, and she can use a special barrier to guard Sonic. Shadow's sections are similarly speedy, albeit more combat-oriented, with some segments having him ride vehicles. In contrast, Silver's levels are slower and revolve around his use of telekinesis to defeat enemies and solve puzzles. In certain areas, control is switched to one of several friend characters, (Note: The friend characters include Tails or Knuckles the Echidna for Sonic, Rouge the Bat or E-123 Omega for Shadow, and Amy Rose or Blaze the Cat for Silver.) with their own abilities.

Although each character traverses the same levels, their unique abilities allow the player to access different areas in each stage and prevent them from accessing certain items. Scattered through each level are golden rings, which serve as a form of health. The rings can protect a character from a single hit by an enemy or obstacle, at which point they will be scattered and blink before disappearing. The game begins with Sonic, Shadow, and Silver each assigned a limited number of lives. These lives are successively lost whenever, with no rings in their possession, the characters are hit by an enemy or obstacle or encounter other fatal hazards. The game ends when the player exhausts the characters' lives. Scattered around certain areas in levels and hub worlds are silver medals, silver coins which players get to collect throughout the adventure. Every few levels, players will encounter a boss stage; to proceed, they must defeat the boss by depleting its health meter.

Upon completion of a level or mission, players are given a grade depending on their performance, with an "S" rank being the best and a "D" rank being the worst. Players are given money for completing missions; more money is given to higher ranks. This money can be used to buy upgrades for the main player character. Certain upgrades are required to complete the game. The game also features two multiplayer modes: "Tag", a cooperative mode where two players must clear levels together and gain Chaos Emeralds, and "Battle", a player versus player mode where two players race against each other.

== Plot ==
Doctor Eggman kidnaps Princess Elise of Soleanna in the hopes of harnessing the Flames of Disaster, (Note: The Flames of Disaster is also known as Iblis.) a destructive power sealed inside her. Aided by his friends Tails and Knuckles, Sonic works to rescue Elise from Eggman. Meanwhile, Shadow, his fellow agent Rouge, and Eggman accidentally release an evil creature, Mephiles. The creature transports the agent duo to a post-apocalyptic future ravaged by a demonic monster, Iblis. When Mephiles meets survivors Silver and Blaze, he fools them into thinking Sonic is the cause of the destruction, and sends them to the present to kill him.

Throughout the story, Sonic and friends travel between the past, present, and future in their efforts to stop Mephiles and Iblis and protect Elise from Doctor Eggman. Though at first Silver stalks Sonic and impedes his attempts to save Elise, Shadow reveals to him that Sonic is not the cause of his world's suffering, but rather Mephiles, who is trying to change the past for his own evil purposes. They travel ten years in the past and learn that Mephiles seeks to bond with Iblis, who was sealed within Elise as a child, as they are the two halves of Soleanna's omnipotent god, Solaris. Mephiles eventually succeeds after killing Sonic to make Elise cry over his death, releasing her seal on Iblis and merging with him with the use of Chaos Emeralds to become Solaris, who then attempts to consume time itself. The heroes and Elise respectively collect and use the power of the Chaos Emeralds to revive Sonic, and he, Shadow, and Silver transform into their super forms to defeat Solaris. Sonic and Elise are brought to the past and extinguish Solaris' flame, removing the god from existence and preventing the events from ever occurring. Despite this, Sonic and Elise show faint signs of recalling their encounter afterwards.

== Development ==
=== Conception ===
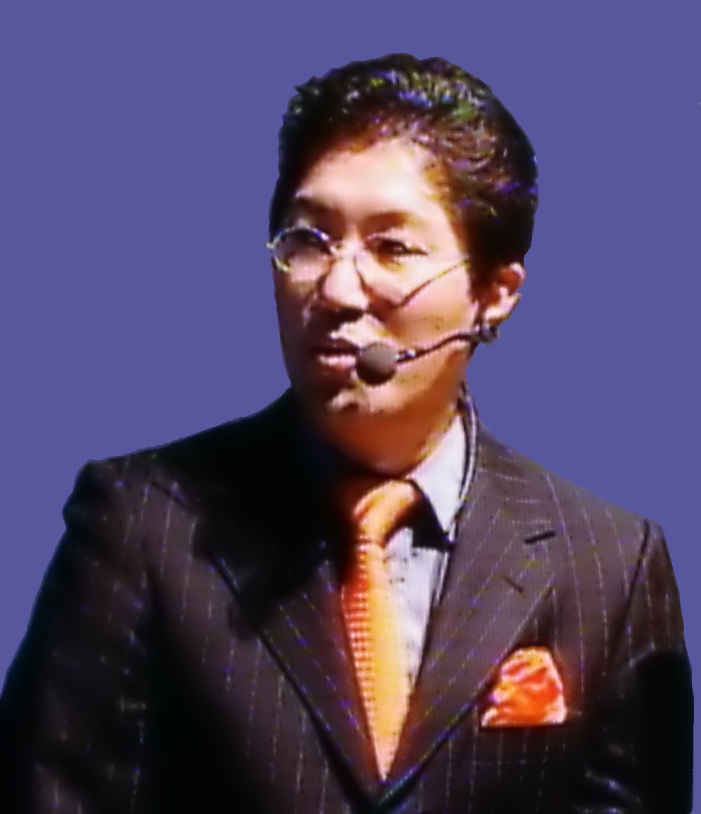
Yuji Naka led Sonic the Hedgehog's development until he left the project in early 2006 to start Prope.

Sonic Team began planning what would become Sonic the Hedgehog after finishing the 2003 games Billy Hatcher and the Giant Egg and Sonic Heroes. They began outlining a game with a realistic tone and physics engine; it was initially unrelated to Sonic, but became a Sonic game after Sega asked Sonic Team to start working on one. Sonic the Hedgehog was conceived for sixth-generation consoles, but Sonic Team realized its release would coincide with the franchise's 15th anniversary and decided to develop it for seventh-generation consoles such as the PlayStation 3 and Xbox 360. According to Sonic's co-creator Yuji Naka, the head of Sonic Team at the time, Sonic Team received specifications for the seventh-generation consoles in late 2004 and began developing tech demos when they obtained software development kits in early 2005 (excluding the Wii).

Naka wanted the first Sonic game for seventh-generation systems to reach a wide audience. He noted the success of superhero films such as Spider-Man 2 (2004) and Batman Begins (2005): "When Marvel or DC Comics turn their characters into films, they are thinking of them as blockbusters, huge hits, and that's what we were trying to emulate." Sonic Team used the same title as the original Sonic the Hedgehog (1991) to indicate that it would be a major advance from the previous games. Sonic Team saw Sonic the Hedgehog as a "rebirth" of the franchise, so sources commonly describe it as an attempted reboot. Shun Nakamura served as director.

=== Design ===
Concept art of Silver the Hedgehog, who was conceived to take advantage of the Havok engine

Sonic Team used the Havok physics engine, which they first used for their PlayStation 2 game Astro Boy (2004). The character artist Yoshinari Amaike said it allowed Sonic Team to create expansive levels impossible on earlier consoles with detailed objects and varied gameplay. In addition, the engine also enabled Sonic Team to experiment with aspects such as global illumination, a night-and-day system, and giving Sonic new abilities like using ropes to leap into the air.

Sonic Team chose a more realistic, Japan-inspired setting than those of previous Sonic games. They redesigned Sonic and Doctor Eggman to better suit this updated environment: Sonic was made taller, with longer quills, and Eggman was made slimmer and given a more realistic appearance. Nakamura and the producer Masahiro Kumono reasoned this was because the characters would be interacting with more humans, and felt this would appeal to older players. At one point, Sonic Team considered giving Sonic realistic fur and rubber textures.

While Sonic Team focused significantly on the visuals, they considered their primary challenge creating a game that was as appealing as the original Sega Genesis Sonic games. Naka said Sonic Team wanted to retain Sonic's traditional elements while adding new elements to appease both old and new players. They felt Sonic Heroes (2003) and Shadow the Hedgehog (2005) had veered into different directions and wanted to return the series to its speed-based roots in new ways. For example, they wanted to include multiple paths in levels, like the Genesis games had, a goal the realistic environments helped achieve. Sonic Team sought to "aggressively" address problems with the virtual camera system from earlier Sonic games, about which they had received many complaints.

Silver the Hedgehog's gameplay style originated from Sonic Team's desire to take advantage of Havok's capabilities. The first design concept for Silver's character was an orange mink; he attained his final hedgehog look after over 50 design iterations. In designing Shadow's gameplay, the developers abandoned the concept of firearms previously used in Shadow the Hedgehog (2005) in favor of combat elements to differentiate him from the other characters. Shadow's gameplay was further fleshed out with the addition of vehicles; each vehicle uses its own physical engine. The CGI cutscenes were produced by Blur Studio. Animation supervisor Leo Santos said Blur faced challenges animating the opening scene due to the placement of Sonic's mouth.

=== Audio ===
The English cast of the Sonic X anime series reprised their voice roles for Sonic the Hedgehog, and actress Lacey Chabert supplied the voice of series newcomer and damsel in distress Princess Elise. The score was primarily composed by Tomoya Ohtani along with Hideaki Kobayashi, Mariko Nanba, Taihei Sato, and Takahito Eguchi. It was the first Sonic game that Ohtani, who had previously contributed to Sonic Heroes and Shadow the Hedgehog, worked on as sound director. The main theme, the fantasy-rap song "His World", was performed by Ali Tabatabaee and Matty Lewis of the band Zebrahead. Crush 40 performed Shadow's theme, "All Hail Shadow", (Note: "All Hail Shadow" was first featured in Shadow the Hedgehog, instead performed by the band Magna-Fi.) while vocalist Bentley Jones (previously known as Lee Brotherton) sang Silver's theme, "Dreams of an Absolution". R&B artist Akon performed a remix of the Dreams Come True song "Sweet Sweet Sweet", a song previously used as the ending theme to Sonic the Hedgehog 2 (1992). Donna De Lory sang Elise's theme, "My Destiny".

Because Sonic the Hedgehog was the first Sonic game for seventh-generation consoles, Ohtani "aimed to emphasise that it was an epic next-generation title". Dreams Come True's Masato Nakamura, who composed the music for the first two Sonic games, supervised Sonic the Hedgehog's soundtrack. Two soundtrack albums were released on January 10, 2007, under Sega's Wave Master label: Sonic the Hedgehog Vocal Traxx: Several Wills and Sonic the Hedgehog Original Soundtrack. Vocal Traxx: Several Wills contains seven songs; four are from the game, while the remaining three are remixes, including a version of "His World" performed by Crush 40. Original Soundtrack includes all 93 tracks featured in Sonic the Hedgehog, spanning three discs.

=== Production problems ===
As development progressed, Sonic Team faced serious problems. In March 2006, Naka resigned as head of Sonic Team to form his own company, Prope, as he wanted to focus on original properties instead of Sonic. With his departure, "the heart and soul of Sonic" was gone, according to former Sega of America CEO Tom Kalinske.

Further problems developed after Sonic Team received development kits for Nintendo's Wii, which was less powerful than the PlayStation 3 and Xbox 360. Sonic the Hedgehog was originally intended for release on all major seventh-generation consoles as well as Windows, but Sega believed porting it to the Wii would take too long, and entrusted Yojiro Ogawa with leading an original game that would use the motion detection function of the Wii Remote, Nakamura and his team would continue to work on Sonic the Hedgehog for the PlayStation 3 and Xbox 360, while Yojiro Ogawa along with his own team, began work on Sonic and the Secret Rings (2007) for the Wii.

Pressured by Sega to finish in time for the 2006 holiday shopping season, Sonic Team rushed the final stages of development, ignoring control problems and bug reports from Sega's quality assurance department. They cut several features, including a day-and-night cycle and an online multiplayer mode. Ogawa said the final period proved to be a large challenge for Sonic Team. Not only was the Xbox 360 release imminent, but the PlayStation 3 launch was scheduled not long afterwards. This put tremendous pressure on the team to develop for both systems. The producer Takashi Iizuka said: "We didn't have any time to polish and we were just churning out content as quick as we could." Sonic Team was unable to finish Sonic the Hedgehog by its deadline, but Sega decided to release the unfinished game anyway to coincide with Sonic's 15th anniversary.

== Release ==
Sonic the Hedgehog was announced in a closed-doors presentation at the Electronic Entertainment Expo (E3) in May 2005. Later that year, at TGS in September, Naka revealed the title and said its release would correspond with the series' 15th anniversary. A demo version was playable at E3 2006. A second demo, featuring a short section of Sonic's gameplay, was released via Xbox Live in September 2006. Sega released several packages of desktop wallpaper featuring characters from the game, and American publisher Prima Games published an official strategy guide, written by Fletcher Black. Sega also made a deal with Microsoft to run advertisements in Windows Live Messenger.

The Xbox 360 version was released in North America on November 14, 2006, followed by a European release on November 24. Both versions were released in Japan on December 21. The PlayStation 3 version was released in North America on January 30, 2007, and in Europe on March 23 as a launch title for the PS3 which was released in Europe and Australia that same day. The game is often referred to by critics and fans with colloquial terms that reference its year of release, such as Sonic 2006 or Sonic '06.

In 2007, Sega released several packages of downloadable content that added features to single-player gameplay. Each of the three main characters received a more difficult single-player mode and a boss rush mode in which the player must defeat all a character's bosses back-to-back. One downloadable addition, "Team Attack Amigo" mode, sends players through a multitude of levels, changing to a different character every two or three levels and culminating in a boss fight. The PlayStation 3 version was delayed to allow more time to incorporate the downloadable content, and thus launched alongside it.

Sonic the Hedgehog was digitally rereleased via the Xbox Live Marketplace on April 15, 2010. The following October, various Sonic games with average or below average scores on the review aggregator website Metacritic, including Sonic the Hedgehog, were delisted from retailers. Sega reasoned this was to avoid confusing customers and increase the value of the brand, following positive prerelease responses to Sonic the Hedgehog 4: Episode I and Sonic Colors (both 2010). Sonic the Hedgehog was relisted on the Xbox 360 Marketplace in select countries on May 24, 2022.

== Reception ==
Reception

Aggregate score
Aggregator	Score
Metacritic	46/100 (X360); 43/100 (PS3)

Review scores
Publication	Score
1Up.com	C (X360)
Eurogamer	2/10 (X360)
Famitsu	30/40 (X360); 29/40 (PS3)
Game Informer	6.75/10 (X360)
GameSpot	4.4/10 (X360); 4.2/10 (PS3)
GameSpy	1.5/5 (X360)
GamesRadar+	2/5
GameZone	4.5/10 (X360)
IGN	4.8/10 (X360); 4.2/10 (PS3)
Official Xbox Magazine (UK)	6/10 (X360)
Play	5.5/10 (PS3); 8.5/10 (X360)
PSM3	4.7/10 (PS3)
TeamXbox	6/10 (X360)
The A.V. Club	D−

Sonic the Hedgehog was well received during prerelease showings. Reception to the prior games Sonic Heroes and Shadow the Hedgehog had been mixed; after a number of well-received showings and demos, some felt Sonic the Hedgehog could be a return to the series' roots. GameSpot said it "showed a considerable amount of promise" after playing a demo at E3 2006, and GameSpy praised its graphics and environments. GamesRadar said that it had looked "amazing" before its release.

Sonic the Hedgehog received widespread negative reviews. Metacritic classified both versions' reception as "generally unfavorable". Sega reported that the game sold strongly, with 870,000 copies sold in the United States and Europe within 4 months. The Xbox 360 version was branded under the Platinum Hits budget line.

Critics were divided on the presentation. IGN called its graphics and audio "decent" and felt its interface and menu system worked well but lacked polish, but GameSpot said the graphics, while colorful, were bland and only a small improvement over sixth-generation games, a sentiment echoed by 1UP.com. Game Informer and Eurogamer noted several graphical glitches. Eurogamer also criticized the decision to continue the Sonic Adventure style of gameplay, believing that Sonic Team had learned nothing from the criticisms of past games.

Reviewers criticized the camera system, loading times, controls, level design and glitches. GameSpot said the level design was worsened by the frustrating camera system, and Game Informer criticized the high difficulty, citing the camera as causing most deaths. Some reviewers were unhappy that the majority of the game was not spent playing as Sonic; GameSpot found playing as Tails boring. Eurogamer found the supporting cast annoying, and considered the camera system the worst they had ever seen. 1UP felt that despite the control and level design problems, the game still played like a Sonic game.

The plot was criticized as confusing and inappropriately dark. GamesRadar considered it overwrought and "conceptually challenged", and Eurogamer found its voice acting painful and its cutscenes cringeworthy. Some reviewers unfavorably compared the story to an anime or Final Fantasy. The romance between Sonic and the human Princess Elise was especially criticized; for GamesTM, it marked the point "the [Sonic] series had veered off into absolute nonsense".

GameSpot wrote that Sonic was "a mess from top to bottom" that "only the most blindly reverent Sonic the Hedgehog fan could possibly squeeze any enjoyment out of". IGN said that it had some redeeming qualities, with brief segments of gameplay that demonstrated how a next-generation Sonic game could work, but found it "rips them away as soon as it shows them" and concluded that the game failed to reinvent the series. Eurogamer believed the mistakes would have been noticed even if it had been released in 1996.

Game Informer and Dave Halverson of Play Magazine defended the game. Game Informer described it as ambitious and praised the graphics, story, amount of content and replay value, but believed only Sonic fans would enjoy it. Halverson initially gave the Xbox 360 version 9.5/10, praising each character's controls and abilities and calling it the best 3D Sonic game yet. In the following issue, Halverson reassessed it as 8.5/10, writing that he had been told that the load times and glitches in his review copy would not be in the final version. In a later review of the PlayStation 3 version, Halverson was frustrated that the problems had still not been corrected and that the performance was worse despite the extra development time; Halverson gave this version a 5.5/10. The A.V. Club said in 2016 that despite the game's poor quality, the soundtrack has some "genuine rippers".

== Legacy ==
GameTrailers and GamesRadar considered Sonic the Hedgehog one of the most disappointing games of 2006. GamesTM singled out the game when it ranked the Sonic franchise at the top of their list of "Video Game Franchises That Lost Their Way". The A.V. Club, Kotaku, Game Informer, and USgamer called the game the worst in the Sonic series, and the staff of GamesRadar named it among the worst video games of all time. The game remains popular for "Let's Play" walkthroughs, with players showing off its glitches. In 2019, a SnapCube's Real-Time Fandub video gained popularity in which the group of voice actors dubbed over Sonic's cutscenes in a single take, creating a nonsensical, improvisational storyline about video game culture. The official Sonic Twitter account also mocks the game.

Sonic the Hedgehog's critical failure had a lasting effect on the franchise. Hardcore Gamer wrote that following it, "Sonic Team struggled to land on a consistent vision for Sonic, releasing game-after-game with wildly different concepts." In particular, Sonic Team sought to avoid its serious tone, beginning with the next main Sonic game, Sonic Unleashed (2008). With Sonic Colors, The A.V. Club wrote that "the series rediscovered its strength for whimsical tales with light tones."

Sonic the Hedgehog introduced Silver the Hedgehog, Princess Elise, Mephiles, and Iblis to the franchise. While most have made few appearances since, Silver would go on to be a fixture of the Sonic the Hedgehog supporting cast. He was re-introduced in the main chronology as a playable character in Sonic Rivals (2006), and would be further playable in Sonic Rivals 2 (2007), Sonic Riders: Zero Gravity (2008), Mario & Sonic at the Olympic Winter Games (2009) and its follow-ups, and Team Sonic Racing (2019). He is also a minor character in the Nintendo DS version of Sonic Colors (2010), and in Sonic Forces (2017). He also appeared in the Sonic the Hedgehog comic book series published by Archie Comics. Silver and Mephiles have become popular characters among fans, with them ranking as the third and twelfth most popular respectively in a 2025 Japanese poll by Dengeki Online.

The main theme of Sonic the Hedgehog and the theme of Sonic, "His World", was sampled in Drake's 2017 song "KMT".

To celebrate the Sonic franchise's 20th anniversary in 2011, Sega released Sonic Generations, which remade aspects of past Sonic games. The PlayStation 3, Xbox 360, and Windows versions feature a remake of Sonic the Hedgehog's "Crisis City" level, and every version, including the Nintendo 3DS version, includes a reimagined version of the boss battle with Silver. The decision to include Sonic the Hedgehog stages and bosses in Sonic Generations was criticized by critics; James Stephanie Sterling of Destructoid referred to the Silver boss fight as the "catch" of the otherwise high-quality game.

In 2015, a fan group, Gistix, began developing a remake for Windows using the Unity engine. A demo was released in January 2017, and was positively received by journalists. A second demo was released in late 2017, which Eurogamer called ambitious. A second team of fans, led by ChaosX, began developing a separate PC remake in Unity, Sonic P-06, releasing multiple demos from 2019 onward. A PC port built using static recompilation, titled Marathon Recompiled, was released on November 14, 2026, to coincide with the game's 20th anniversary.

The game is referenced by the television series Knuckles, which is set within the continuity of the Sonic film series. In the fourth episode, "The Flames of Disaster", Knuckles' backstory is depicted in the form of a low-budget rock opera, in which he fights and defeats a creature resembling the antagonist Iblis. Within the series, the Flames of Disaster is depicted as a power possessed by Knuckles that allows his fists to burst into flames, rather than another name for Iblis as was the case in the game.

In 2022, the game was relisted on the Xbox 360 Marketplace and stayed relisted until the shut down of the marketplace.

In the 2024 video game Shadow Generations, Kingdom Valley, a level from the game, reappears. Mephiles also returns as a boss fought by Shadow, who has no memory of him due to the game's events being erased from the timeline. Mephiles attempts to take advantage of the time rift to restore himself to the timeline, but is defeated by Shadow.
