= Sonic After the Sequel =

2013 video game

- Title screen
- Developer: Felipe Daneluz (LakeFeperd)
- Publisher: Felipe Daneluz (LakeFeperd)
- Composers: Falk Au Yeong; Funk Fiction; Andy Tunstall; James Landino; Mr Lange; DJ Max-E; Li Xiao'an
- Series: Sonic the Hedgehog (unofficially)
- Engine: Sonic Worlds (Multimedia Fusion 2)
- Platform: Windows
- Release: June 15, 2013
- Genre: Platform
- Mode: Single-player

Sonic After the Sequel is a 2013 platform video game created by Brazilian student Felipe Daneluz (LakeFeperd). It is an unofficial game based on the Sonic the Hedgehog series and set between the official games Sonic the Hedgehog 2 and Sonic the Hedgehog 3. Daneluz's second Sonic game, it follows Sonic Before the Sequel, which is set between the original Sonic the Hedgehog and Sonic the Hedgehog 2. Like its predecessor, After the Sequel stars Sonic the Hedgehog and his sidekick Tails in a quest to retrieve the Chaos Emeralds from Doctor Eggman.

After the Sequel was inspired by Sonic Heroes and other games both inside and outside the Sonic series, and it was developed with Sonic Worlds, an engine based in Multimedia Fusion 2 that reduces the amount of computer programming involved in game creation. It was released as a free download for Windows personal computers on June 15, 2013. The game was very well received by video game journalists, who lauded its preservation of retro Sonic gameplay and its 1990s-style soundtrack. The trilogy of Before the Sequel, After the Sequel, and their successor Sonic Chrono Adventure performed unusually well for fangames, having been downloaded 120,000 times by March 2014.

== Gameplay ==
Sonic the Hedgehog stands on a platform in the first act of the second zone, Sugar Splash Zone.

Sonic After the Sequel is a 2D platformer in the style of the Sonic games for the Sega Genesis. As such, it lets the player control either the blue hedgehog Sonic or his orange fox friend Tails. Both characters can move left and right with the arrow keys and jump with the "Z" key; Tails can also fly to reach areas Sonic cannot. The game takes place in seven levels, known as zones, each divided into three acts followed by a boss fight with Doctor Eggman. These zones are designed for fast-paced gameplay, featuring typical Sonic obstacles such as bottomless pits and vertical loops. The zones are based on various themes, including haunted houses, cities, magma caverns, winter theme parks, and sugar processing plants.

The player collects rings in zones and boss fights as a form of health: upon being hit by an enemy or harmful obstacle, the player's rings will scatter and can be recollected. Being hit while carrying no rings, being crushed by an obstacle, or falling into a bottomless pit causes the player to lose a life; running out of lives results in a game over screen, after which the player must restart the zone from act one. Conversely, collecting 100 rings gets the player an extra life, and completing an act with 50 takes the player to a special stage, where they can collect rings for extra lives. The game also features power-ups throughout its zones, which are activated with the "X" key: these include typical Sonic power-ups such as shields and extra lives, as well as new ones. The "Beam" power-up for Sonic and the "Mirror" power-up for Tails are borrowed from and credited to Nintendo's Kirby series.

== Plot ==
At the end of Sonic the Hedgehog 2, Sonic and Tails fly over the ocean in Tails' biplane, the Tornado, after defeating Doctor Eggman. Beginning from this point, After the Sequel depicts Sonic and Tails noticing a forested island and deciding to make a landing and explore. After completing the first zone, Sonic finds a robot resembling Tails—a trap sprung by Eggman. The robot ensnares Sonic in a force field while Eggman steals Sonic's Chaos Emeralds. Sonic escapes and sets out with Tails to recover the Emeralds.

The two travel through more zones and fight Eggman at the end of each one. They follow Eggman to a forest, where he leads a massive logging operation. Together with Mighty the Armadillo, they destroy his machinery and stop the operation. They continue through the forest and find ghosts that frighten Tails. Destroying one of Eggman's robots lets Sonic see its internal architecture, including a screen that shows Eggman's plans to create an empire and drop a floating island into the sea.

In Parhelion Peak, the game's snow zone, Sonic and Tails notice a feather float down from the sky. They board another of Eggman's airships and complete another zone, whereupon they find another feather. They trace the feathers to Eggman's bird-like robot, which is guarding the Emeralds. Sonic retrieves the Emeralds and uses them to become Super Sonic. He fights the robot as the game's final boss. After its defeat, Sonic and Tails fly aboard the Tornado once more—the segue into the events of Sonic the Hedgehog 3.

== Development and release ==
After the Sequel was created by Felipe Daneluz (known on the Internet as "LakeFeperd"), a student from São Paulo, Brazil. Unlike many longtime Sonic fans, Daneluz remained supportive of the series through its "dark age" in the mid to late 2000s and enjoyed games such as Sonic Riders. (Note: GameRankings scores of titles released in 2006: Sonic Riders: 43.33% – 63.46%; Sonic the Hedgehog (2006): 46.12% – 48.74%; Sonic Genesis: 32.50%; Sonic Rivals: 66.17%) Because of his continued enthusiasm toward later Sonic games, Daneluz decided to create a retro-styled Sonic game. Not being well versed in computer programming, Daneluz took to the open-source, visual game engine Sonic Worlds, which is tailored to create Sonic zones within the program Multimedia Fusion 2. Determined to make his game stand out despite his limited technical proficiency, Daneluz decided to set his first game in the time between Sonic the Hedgehog and Sonic 2, calling it Sonic Before the Sequel. He set the follow-up, entitled Sonic After the Sequel, between Sonic 2 and Sonic 3, and a third installment, Sonic Chrono Adventure, between Sonic 3 and Sonic CD.

After the Sequel's zones were inspired largely by those of Sonic Heroes. One level called RedHot Ride Zone, however, was based mainly on a level of the same name in Donkey Kong Country 2: Diddy's Kong Quest. Ideas for other zones came from Sonic Riders and a Sonic-style song called "Combat Night Zone" by electronic artist MaxieDaMan. Daneluz imagined Sonic being high on sugar in the Sugar Splash Zone. Daneluz began creating each level by sketching out ideas on paper, then transferring them to Adobe Photoshop before working on the enemies and level design. Unlike the publishers of many other games on which fangames have been based, particularly Nintendo, Sonic series publisher Sega has not sent a cease and desist order or other indication of disapproval to Daneluz. He has speculated that the company does not want to upset its fanbase.

The music composition and recording were handled by underground musicians Falk Au Yeong, Funk Fiction, Andy Tunstall, James Landino, DJ Max-E, Mr. Lange, and Li Xiao'an. Daneluz had not made plans to incorporate original music until Falk approached him requesting collaboration on the game. Funk Fiction has claimed that the music spans more than twenty genres and was influenced by rock, jazz, disco, and trip hop and the soundtracks of game franchises like Sonic, Donkey Kong, and Kirby. Due to the levels in After the Sequel generally taking longer to complete than those in Before the Sequel, the music tracks are longer, estimated by Falk as ranging from one minute and 45 seconds to three minutes.

In August 2017, Daneluz re-released the game as Sonic After the Sequel DX. This version features improved physics, the addition of the drop dash from Sonic Mania, and a new final boss. Later in 2019, an unofficial remake called Sonic After the Sequel Omega was released by Compound Games. This version also introduces more improved physics and performance fixes, and retains the drop dash from Sonic After the Sequel DX. It has smoother animations, widescreen support, the restoration of the unused Sugar Splash boss, upgraded menus, and "upgraded bosses". These "upgraded bosses" have received complaints due to their difficulty. This remake has been released on SFGHQ and Game Jolt.

== Reception ==
After the Sequel has received positive coverage for its revitalization of retro Sonic gameplay. Tony Ponce of Destructoid summarized it as "quite the fun little gem that keeps the Genesis-era Sonic spirit alive". He contrasted the retro, fan-made After the Sequel with Sega's efforts to create high-quality 3D titles, lamenting that, fifteen years after the release of Sonic Adventure, Sega was "only now starting to get the hang of the third dimension." John Polson from IndieGames.com called the game "fantastic" and "stunning", while Kotaku's András Neltz stated that "it looks amazing" and advised readers not to let the game's status as a fan work turn them away from it. Nintendo Life writer Damien McFerran also called the game "impressive". The UK gaming staff for Red Bull's website stated that, despite Sega's continual releases of Sonic games, "few have quite recaptured the thrill of blazing through a 2D labyrinth at lightspeed in the way that fan made Sonic After The Sequel has." A second Red Bull article, by author Ben Sillis, exclaimed that "you have to play" it.

The game's music has been particularly well received. Ponce called it "the best music ever" and "simply indescribable", opining that it raised an already high-quality product "to god tier". Ponce wrote an article dedicated to the game's music two days later, clarifying that it equals or surpasses the quality of any other Sonic game's soundtrack. The more reserved Polson claimed that the music "definitely rocks" and is clearer than that of Genesis games. Similarly, the Red Bull staff called the music "absolutely stunning", likening it to gaming soundtracks of the early 1990s. For McFerran, the soundtrack was "just as noteworthy" as the rest of the game.

The game is available as a free download for Windows personal computers. As of March 2014, the trilogy had been downloaded 120,000 times—an unusually high number for fangames—as compared to the 640,000 copies of the official game Sonic Lost World (also released in 2013) sold on the Wii U by the same time.
