= Sonic Unleashed =

2008 video game

- Developer: Sonic Team (Note: Additional work for PlayStation 2 and Wii versions by Dimps.)
- Publisher: Sega (Note: Mobile version published by Gameloft.)
- Director: Yoshihisa Hashimoto
- Producer: Akinori Nishiyama
- Designers: Takao Hirabayashi; Masayuki Inoue; Yoshinobu Uba; Hideo Otsuka
- Programmers: Makoto Suzuki; Takaaki Saito
- Artists: Sachiko Kawamura; Yuji Uekawa; Gurihiru
- Writer: Kiyoko Yoshimura
- Composers: Tomoya Ohtani; Fumie Kumatani; Kenichi Tokoi; Hideaki Kobayashi; Takahito Eguchi; Mariko Nanba
- Series: Sonic the Hedgehog
- Platforms: PlayStation 2; Wii; Xbox 360; PlayStation 3; Mobile phone
- Release: November 18, 2008: PS2, Wii, Xbox 360; NA: November 18, 2008 (PS2 & Wii); NA: November 20th, 2008 (Xbox 360); AU: November 27, 2008; EU: November 28, 2008; JP: December 18, 2008 (Wii); JP: February 19, 2009 (Xbox 360) PlayStation 3; NA: December 9, 2008; AU: December 18, 2008; EU: December 19, 2008; JP: February 19, 2009 Mobile phones; PAL: June 4, 2009
- Genres: Platform, action-adventure, beat 'em up
- Mode: Single-player

Sonic Unleashed (Note: Japanese: ソニックワールドアドベンチャー, Hepburn: Sonikku Wārudo Adobenchā; lit. 'Sonic World Adventure') is a 2008 platform game developed by Sonic Team and published by Sega. An installment in the Sonic the Hedgehog series, it follows Sonic as he attempts to restore the world after his nemesis Doctor Eggman shatters it with a powerful laser to unleash an ancient evil known as Dark Gaia, while struggling with his new "Werehog" form, a werewolf-like affliction. Gameplay features two distinct styles: daytime stages incorporate Sonic's traditional platforming and trademark speed; while night-time stages see Sonic transform into the Werehog and engage in slower combat against waves of enemies using the Werehog's brute strength.

The game's development began in 2005, after the creation of its game engine, the Hedgehog Engine. It was initially conceived as a sequel to Sonic Adventure 2 (2001), but developer Sonic Team began to introduce enough new innovations that separated it from previous games, and it was renamed Sonic World Adventure in domestic markets. The Werehog gameplay was conceived to help introduce newer gamers unfamiliar with the Sonic franchise to the series and is what influenced the use of Unleashed as a subtitle for western markets. The game's existence was first brought to light when Sega trademarked the Unleashed name in March 2008, and shortly after, images and a gameplay video were leaked. Three versions of the game were developed: one by Sonic Team for high-definition consoles (PlayStation 3 and Xbox 360), one by Sonic Team and Dimps for standard-definition consoles (PlayStation 2 and Wii), and one by Gameloft for mobile phones. The game was released worldwide in 2008.

Public anticipation for Sonic Unleashed was high, as video game journalists saw it as a possible return to Sonic's platforming roots. While it was commercially successful, selling 2.45 million units, initial critical reception was mixed. Reviewers praised certain elements, such as the sense of speed in daylight stages and the graphics and audio that make up the environments, but criticized others, such as the Werehog game mechanic, as well as several gameplay and design concepts; many felt Unleashed was not the game to reinvigorate the series. The PlayStation 3 version was added to PlayStation Now in March 2017, while the Xbox 360 version was made backward compatible for Xbox One in November 2018, and extended to the Xbox Series X/S while receiving a performance boost on November 15, 2021. An unofficial port of the game to Microsoft Windows and Linux was released on March 1, 2025.

== Gameplay ==
Third-person gameplay in daytime levels (Apotos, PS3/360 version)

Sonic Unleashed is a platform game in which the player controls the titular Sonic the Hedgehog in two modes: fast-paced levels that take place during daytime, showcasing and using Sonic's trademark speed as seen in previous games in the series, and slower, night-time levels, during which Sonic transforms into the Werehog, and gameplay switches to an action-based, brawler style of play, in which Sonic battles Gaia enemies (those created by the main enemy in the game, Dark Gaia). Each level takes place on a particular continent, each of which is based on a real-world location. In sections of the PlayStation 3 and Xbox 360 versions of the game, the player may choose to advance the time of day in order to play as either Sonic or the Werehog; in the PlayStation 2 and Wii versions, time is advanced automatically.

Daytime levels focus on Sonic's speed, and to this extent, sees the player control Sonic through fast-moving stages containing both 2D and 3D styles of gameplay. 2D sections are reminiscent of the Mega Drive/Genesis-era Sonic games where the player controls Sonic in a side-scrolling fashion. The game also features a gameplay mechanic previously used in the Sonic Rush series called the Sonic Boost (or just "Boost"), which greatly increases Sonic's speed, allowing him to smash through objects, destroy enemies instantly, or even access different level paths. In the PlayStation 3 and Xbox 360 versions, an on-screen "Ring Energy" meter displays how much Boost is available. The amount of Boost remaining may be increased by collecting more rings, and is decreased by using the Boost. In contrast, the PlayStation 2 and Wii versions of the game represent available Boost using bars, which may be added by performing "Action Chains", destroying multiple enemies in quick succession through the use of homing attacks, or by collecting rings. Japanese game company Dimps helped design some of the stages.

Werehog gameplay in night-time levels (Spagonia, PS2/Wii version)

Night-time levels are slow-paced and action-oriented, while also featuring simple puzzle elements. Gameplay focuses on Sonic's new "Werehog" form, which gives him great strength and large, stretchable arms. As the Werehog, the player can cling to distant objects, move items around and perform combo attacks to defeat enemies and advance through the level. Collecting rings replenishes the Werehog's health, while a special move, Unleashed Mode, allows him to channel his energy into increasing the power of his attacks for a short time. Night-time levels are adjusted in the PlayStation 2 and Wii versions to allow the Wii version greater use of the Wii Remote, such that players may control the arms of the Werehog by using the Wii Remote and Nunchuk in order to grab onto objects and proceed in the levels. The PlayStation 2 and Wii versions also expand upon the ratio of night-time levels to daytime, with more than three times as many night-time levels (twenty-five in all). After night-time levels are completed, Dark Gaia Points are gained, allowing the player access to bonus moves.

In addition to these two gameplay types, Sonic Unleashed also features hub worlds, in which the player may reveal, as well as advance, the story of the game. Hub worlds operate differently depending on the version of the game being played; the PlayStation 3 and Xbox 360 versions feature fully interactive, explorable 3D hub worlds, similar to those in Sonic the Hedgehog and Sonic Adventure, in which townspeople may be interacted with and side quests may be undertaken, in order to gain experience or unlock items, such as artwork, videos and music tracks. In contrast, the PlayStation 2 and Wii versions feature menu-based map systems, in which players simply click on areas to talk to townspeople and find information, and Gaia Gates in which players can access levels using the tablets that open doors. Within both daytime and night-time levels are medals that Sonic may collect, two types of which exist: Sun and Moon. In the PlayStation 3 and Xbox 360 versions, collecting these medals allows the player to level up Sonic's Sun and Moon stats, and these must be increased to reach new stages in the game, with a certain number of Sun Medals for Hedgehog levels, and a certain number of Moon Medals for Werehog levels. Because only the PlayStation 3 and Xbox 360 versions feature playable hub worlds, these are also the only versions in which Sun and Moon Medals may be found by exploring the towns, talking to the citizens, and completing side quests. In the PlayStation 2 and Wii versions, Sun and Moon Medals are earned after completing stages and clearing their objectives. The medals are used to open up doors in the Gaia Gates, which allow players access to puzzle rooms where they can earn bonus content.

== Plot ==
Real-life countries which the world of the game takes inspiration from

Sonic is pursuing his nemesis, Doctor Eggman, bounding around a fleet of spaceships. Sonic transforms into Super Sonic and corners Eggman on a nearby space station. However, it is revealed to be a powerful new weapon known as the Chaos Energy Cannon, which not only traps and forcefully reverts Sonic to his normal state and extracts the Chaos Emeralds from him, but also drains them of their power, resulting in them becoming inert. Eggman then uses the Emeralds' energy to fire an enormous laser that unleashes an ancient evil known as Dark Gaia from the planet's core, which shatters its surface into seven pieces. In addition, the process has the unforeseen side-effect of transforming Sonic into a "Werehog"—a werewolf-like affliction that strips the hedgehog of his speed but bestows greater strength and abilities—during nighttime. Eggman ejects Sonic into space, who then lands safely onto the planet below.

After landing along with the Emeralds, Sonic encounters a friendly creature who appears to suffer from amnesia. Assuming he has caused it with his fall, Sonic decides to assist him in his quest to find out who he is and the creature becomes a guide for Sonic; he eventually gives him the nickname "Chip". Sonic's quest begins and with the help of some old friends, such as Amy Rose and Tails, he attempts to solve the crisis by traveling the world's continents and finding Gaia Temples that will restore the Emeralds' power in order to return the world, and himself, back to normal.

After six out of the seven continents are returned to normal, Chip is able to regain his memory; he is in fact Dark Gaia's opposite, Light Gaia. Since the beginning of time, the duo had been in an eternal conflict where Dark Gaia would break the planet apart and he would put it back together. Chip was released along with Dark Gaia, but because both of them were released prematurely, he lost his memory and Dark Gaia was broken apart. They are able to place the last Chaos Emerald in the shrine on the final continent at Eggman's new empire, "Eggmanland", but are intercepted by him; Sonic then takes on the doctor's latest contraption that utilizes Dark Gaia's power. Following the battle, the trio wind up in the planet's core and encounter Dark Gaia, whom Eggman orders to finish Sonic, but it ignores and swats him away before absorbing the power that turned Sonic into a Werehog, curing Sonic of that condition.

Dark Gaia then attacks Sonic and Chip, but Chip protects Sonic and calls all of the Gaia temples together to form the Gaia Colossus and fight his opposite. Even though the duo gain the upper hand, Dark Gaia soon envelops the planet in darkness and fully matures. Chip then gives the restored Chaos Emeralds to Sonic, allowing him to turn into Super Sonic and continue their fight, until Dark Gaia is finally defeated and returned to dormancy, but the battle takes its toll on Super Sonic. Chip saves Sonic by sending him back to the surface before returning himself to his own dormancy; he leaves behind his necklace and some parting words. Sonic fashions the necklace as a bracelet to remind him of their adventure together before speeding off with Tails.

== Development ==
=== Conception ===
Development on Sonic Unleashed began in mid-2005 at Sonic Team, with Yoshihisa Hashimoto as director. It was originally intended to be the third installment of the Sonic Adventure series and subsequently, at an early development stage, had the working title Sonic World Adventure, complete with a work-in-progress logo. However, the development team began to introduce enough new innovations to separate it from the Sonic Adventure games, and so a new title, Sonic Unleashed, was decided.

Concept art of Sonic Unleashed's opening cutscene where Sonic lands on Eggman's battleship

Sonic Team decided early on in the development process to reduce the number of characters present in the game, as well as to make Sonic the only playable character; this decision was taken to get more quality out of fewer characters. While it felt that these ideas combined with traditional Sonic gameplay was a good beginning, it also had to consider how to introduce newer gamers unfamiliar with the Sonic franchise to the series, and so the concept of the Werehog was born, in addition to exploring its own mythology and ideas for the story. Director Yoshihisa Hashimoto felt from the outset that there would be both praise and criticism, but hoped that long-term Sonic fans would understand and empathize with the ideas and direction the team had taken. The game's human non-player characters were designed by Japanese artist team Gurihiru. The opening was animated by Marza Animation Planet with Shinji Aramaki as director.

=== Design ===
Sonic Unleashed ran on the Hedgehog Engine, which began development in mid-2005 after Hashimoto was put in charge of making a Sonic game for high-end hardware. While excited at the prospect of creating a game for the PlayStation 3 and Xbox 360, with no development environment prepared for them, he and several other developers spent a year figuring out the technical aspects. In terms of technology, Hashimoto remarked that the visual style was born out of desire to see a global illumination solution used for the game's lighting—that is, light reflecting from one object in the scene onto others, feeling that contemporary HD games looked too flat. To this extent, development on the renderer for this process began, and the final solution allowed the developers to use distributed rendering over hundreds of computers to calculate lighting for each 8 to 20 kilometer action stage in around two or three days. Characters, enemies and objects are then lit at run-time with Sonic Team's "Light Field" technology to blend them in with the surrounding pre-calculated lighting. Due to the size of the GI maps, the developers considered splitting the game across two or three discs on the Xbox 360 due to space limitations, but eventually decided to instead reduce their resolution so the whole game to fit onto one disc. In addition, the Xbox 360 version is capped at 30 frames per second, while the PlayStation 3 version is uncapped and can reach 60 frames in some areas.

Because the game was being developed for two levels of hardware capability depending on the target platform, two development "silos" were set up to work on two separate builds of the game: one for the PlayStation 3 and Xbox 360 version utilizing the Hedgehog Engine, and one for the PlayStation 2 and Wii version, which instead utilizes a modified version of an existing, internal Sega engine. Hashimoto, who had never directed a Sonic game before, incorporated new features such as a "Quick Step" mechanic allowing players to dodge obstacles with the left and right bumpers. Hashimoto sought to combine the best qualities of 2D and 3D Sonic gameplay and address the criticisms directed at previous 3D entries in the franchise. Additional code to dynamically adjust the speed of the game for different situations was used to properly balance its fast pace with traditional platforming elements. The addition of Ring Energy used for the Boost was made to give the rings more importance in gameplay, noting that having more than one would make little difference in gameplay beforehand.

As well as the unique motion-based gameplay mechanics, the Wii version of the game also supports the GameCube controller, and also the option of using the Classic Controller. The daytime levels for the PlayStation 2 and Wii versions were altered to accommodate the Wii's motion control-based boost mechanic, while night-time levels include a mostly behind-the-back view and different platforming styles and combat mechanics. Developer Dimps, who had past involvement in the Sonic franchise, was involved in the design of the daytime areas for these versions. In addition, overall, the PlayStation 2 and Wii versions have fewer daytime levels than the PlayStation 3 and Xbox 360 counterparts.

== Release and marketing ==
The title Sonic Unleashed was trademarked by Sega on March 12, 2008. Screenshots of cutscenes, artwork, and a video were leaked ten days later from their FTP server, with the title confirmed by Sega on April 3, 2008, with a small selection of screenshots and an updated video. Initially, it was stated that Unleashed was to be intended solely as a single-player experience, and would not offer any multiplayer or online modes. This was cast into doubt when references to online modes were alluded to around E3 2008, but later interviews re-iterated that Unleashed would have no online modes at all. However, downloadable content, including additional levels, would remain a possibility after the game's release. A demo version was released on the Xbox Live Marketplace on December 8, 2008, and on the American and European PlayStation Stores on December 18 and 24, 2008, respectively. The demo does not contain any of the Werehog stages.

Sonic Unleashed was released for PlayStation 2, Wii and Xbox 360 on November 18, 2008, in North America, and on November 27 and November 28, 2008, in Australia and Europe, respectively. The PlayStation 3 version was released a month later on December 9 in North America, on December 18 in Australia, and on December 19 in Europe. In Japan, the Wii version was released on December 18, 2008, with the PlayStation 3 and Xbox 360 versions being pushed back to the next year due to manufacturing issues, on February 19, 2009; the PlayStation 2 version was not released in the region. It was revealed that the game's name in Japan would in fact remain Sonic World Adventure for its release there. On March 12, 2009, Sega released Sonic Unleashed's first DLC for the PlayStation 3 and Xbox 360, consisting of four Chun-nan daytime stages and two night stages in addition to two new missions. DLC was later released for the remaining stages except for Eggmanland.

A short animated film was released online to tie in with the game on November 17, 2008, titled Sonic: Night of the Werehog, (Note: Japanese: ソニック&チップ 恐怖の館, Hepburn: Sonikku ando Chippu Kyōfu no Yakata; lit. 'Sonic and Chip: House of Horror') produced by Marza. In the short, Sonic and Chip come across a haunted house during the night and are hounded by a group of ghosts. In addition to its online release, the short was shown for free at nine selected theaters in Japan for three weeks starting on December 20, 2008, in collaboration with T-Joy Corporation. Archie Comics also published an adaptation of Sonic Unleashed featuring the opening cutscene and Sonic's transformation into the Werehog. In May 2009, mobile game developer Gameloft announced that it had secured a licensing agreement with Sega Europe to produce Java versions of Sega properties, and that its first game would be a version of Sonic Unleashed for mobile devices. It was released in June 2009 in PAL regions. The mobile version of Sonic Unleashed is strictly a side-scroller reminiscent of the original Genesis games, featuring new level designs and character abilities.

While a 2010 quote from Sega's at-the-time SVP of EMEA caused many to believe Sonic Unleashed would be removed from retail, a later quote from SOA's VP of sales and marketing proved this to be an exaggeration, and that the game would not be removed from stores. The PlayStation 3 version was added to PlayStation Now in April 2017. The Xbox 360 version was made backward compatible for Xbox One in November 2018; on November 15, 2021, its compatibility was extended to the Xbox Series X/S, including FPS Boost to allow it to run at 60 frames per second.

=== Music ===
The game's soundtrack, Planetary Pieces: Sonic World Adventure Original Soundtrack, was released as a three-disc set in Japan on January 28, 2009. The vocal theme track, "Endless Possibility", written by longtime Sonic game composer Tomoya Ohtani, features Jaret Reddick of the American rock band Bowling for Soup. The ending theme, "Dear My Friend", features vocals by singer Brent Cash.

== Reception ==
Reception

Aggregate score
Aggregator	Score
Metacritic	66/100 (Wii/PS2); 60/100 (X360); 54/100 (PS3)

Review scores
Publication	Score
1Up.com	C (X360); D (Wii)
Eurogamer	6/10 (Wii); 4/10 (X360)
G4	2/5
Game Informer	6.5/10 (Wii); 6/10 (X360/PS3)
GameSpot	7/10 (Wii); 3.5/10 (X360/PS3)
GamesRadar+	3/5
GamesTM	5/10
GameTrailers	7/10 (Wii/X360)
IGN	7.2/10 (Wii); 7/10 (PS2); 4.5/10 (X360/PS3)
Nintendo Life	6/10 (Wii)
Nintendo Power	8/10 (Wii)
Nintendo World Report	4/10 (Wii)
Official Nintendo Magazine	79% (Wii)
Official U.S. PlayStation Magazine	4/10
Official Xbox Magazine (US)	6.5/10
VideoGamer.com	6/10

Initial anticipation when the first media for Unleashed was revealed was high, as the demonstration videos hinted at a possible return of Sonic to his traditional platforming roots, especially because of the series' declining quality in recent years, and a number of poorly received games in the franchise that preceded it, such as the 2006 game Sonic the Hedgehog.

Sonic Unleashed received "mixed or average" reviews, with Metacritic aggregate scores of 60 and 54 out of 100 for the Xbox 360 and PlayStation 3 versions respectively, and 66 out of 100 for the Wii and PlayStation 2 versions. The added element of motion controls for the Werehog sections, as well as text-based hub worlds and better Werehog level design and camera system, were reasons cited for the higher review scores for the Wii and PlayStation 2 versions of the game, though a few review websites, such as 1UP, gave the Wii version a lower score than its Xbox 360 and PlayStation 3 counterparts. Nevertheless, the game was a commercial success and sold 2.45 million units combined making it Sega's third bestselling game during their last fiscal year period of 2008.

Positive elements of Sonic Unleashed remarked upon by reviews include the environments, such as the "postcard-perfect architecture", and the graphics, with stages looking "absolutely gorgeous" and being "very pretty and lovingly animated", with one reviewer comparing them to a playable Pixar film. Praise was given to the technical competence of Sega's new Hedgehog Engine as a whole on the Xbox 360 and PlayStation 3 versions, with "bright cartoonish graphics that fly by without a stutter"; however, some complaints were raised about frame rate reduction when large numbers of enemies appeared during the Werehog sections. Although the Wii and PlayStation 2 versions do not use the Hedgehog Engine, graphics for these platforms were still praised for their high quality, with the game being nominated for Best Graphics Technology for the Wii by IGN in its 2008 video game awards. The soundtrack to the game was also praised as being an improvement on more recent installments in the series; use of an orchestral score, rather than rock as in more recent games, was appreciated.

A generally negative reaction was given by critics to the Werehog concept and corresponding night-time sections, which contributed greatly to the lower than expected review scores. Some reviewers compared the Werehog sections to God of War. Complaints stemmed from the game's change of speed, from high-speed daytime sections to the slower, night-time sections; the "pace-breaking combat levels" were described as "plodding", as well as "lethargic" and "combat-heavy". Further to the change of pace, the new style of gameplay that accompanies the night-time levels was widely criticized, involving "frustrating" platform elements and combat described as "boring", with "awkward" action sequences overall. Some reviewers felt that the Werehog as a concept did not mix well with the daylight areas and traditional Sonic gameplay; GamePro's review described them as "dreadfully out-of-place", while IGN stated that they have "nothing to do with Sonic whatsoever", feeling that the Werehog was "being slapped on" to the Sonic experience.

In stark contrast to the Werehog sections, many reviewers found the daytime levels to be enjoyable, especially the "exhilarating" sense of speed they provide; with "the most satisfying gameplay of any Sonic title in years", the game "perfectly [captures] the feel of classic Sonic". Many also enjoyed the mixture of, and transition between, 2D and 3D sections. Indeed, many reviewers remarked that they would have appreciated the game more had it consisted solely of, and expanded upon, the daytime levels. GameSpot's review for the Xbox 360 version, however, argued that the controls were "unresponsive" in the daytime levels, and that most of them were "horribly designed", instead describing the Wii version as a "vastly superior experience", with its daytime levels praised for better control and design.

Aside from the criticism of Werehog levels, further aspects of the game were criticized, contributing to the mixed review scores. The quests that players must undertake in hub-towns were described as "inane" and "tedious", where "figuring out what happens next involves aimlessly wandering through towns and speaking to citizens, only to discover that most of them don't know what we're looking for". The story and overall tone of the game, including the new character Chip, were criticised, some remarking that it was too juvenile, or comparable to that of a Saturday morning cartoon.

== Legacy ==
Speaking after the game's release, Sonic Team member and Sonic and the Black Knight (2009) producer and director Tetsu Katano remarked that although he did not feel the Werehog concept was a mistake, time and resources were a limiting factor in the game's production. He also remarked that the Werehog may reappear in future games, or possibly in a sequel to Sonic Unleashed, should one be made. In the lead up to the release of Sonic Colors (2010), producer Takashi Iizuka expressed regret at the inclusion of the Werehog, stating that it clashed with Sonic's core gameplay. Another short featuring the ghost characters from Night of the Werehog, titled Ghost Tale, was released by Marza Animation Planet on October 31, 2023, 15 years after Night of the Werehog's release.

The gameplay of the daytime stages would be reused and expanded upon to become the defining gameplay of the franchise for the following decade, with Sonic Colors, Sonic Generations (2011), and Sonic Forces (2017) taking inspiration from Unleashed. The home console/PC versions of Sonic Generations contain remakes of the "Rooftop Run" stage and the Egg Dragoon boss fight. Sonic Forces also contains a re-imagined version of the Egg Dragoon boss. The Hedgehog Engine would be refined for future entries, being reworked into Hedgehog Engine 2 starting with Forces.

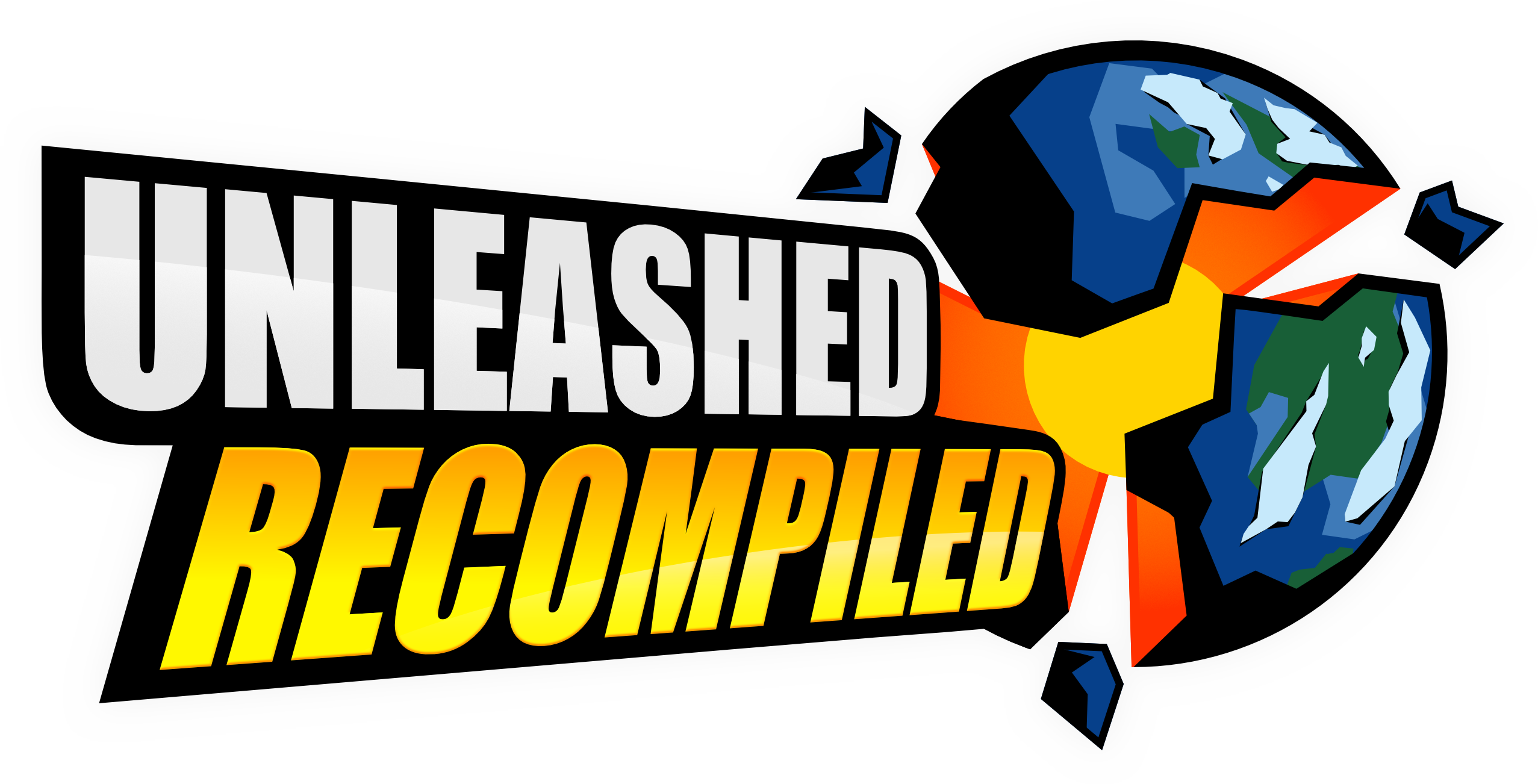
Unleashed Recompiled logo

Due to the game being released exclusively on sixth and seventh generation video game consoles as well as the instability of video game console emulators like RPCS3 and Xenia, fan efforts emerged to port the game to personal computers. In March 2013, a group of fans created a mod for Sonic Generations titled the Unleashed Project, which ported the daytime stages of Unleashed to Generations. On March 1, 2025, an unofficial PC port of the game called Unleashed Recompiled was released. The port contains numerous enhancements, including support for high resolutions and framerates, as well as mod support. The port was made using an open-source binary recompiler of Xbox 360 executables. The port supports both Microsoft Windows and Linux operating systems.
