= Balan Wonderworld =

2021 video game

- Cover art, featuring central character Balan
- Developers: Arzest; Balan Company
- Publisher: Square Enix
- Director: Yuji Naka
- Producers: Naoto Ohshima; Noriyoshi Fujimoto
- Designer: Tomohide Hayashi
- Programmer: Yuki Hatakeyama
- Artists: Naoto Ohshima; Yuki Endo; Masamichi Harada
- Writers: Soushi Kawasaki; Yuji Naka
- Composers: Ryo Yamazaki; Hironori Anazawa
- Engine: Unreal Engine 4
- Platforms: Nintendo Switch; PlayStation 4; PlayStation 5; Windows; Xbox One; Xbox Series X/S
- Release: March 26, 2021
- Genres: Platform, action-adventure
- Modes: Single-player; Multiplayer

Balan Wonderworld (Note: Japanese: バランワンダーワールド, Hepburn: Baran Wandāwārudo) is a 2021 platform game developed by Arzest and Balan Company and published by Square Enix. Assuming the role of two children guided by a magical being called Balan, the player explores twelve worlds themed after the hearts of troubled individuals. They explore levels, collecting items to progress to further areas, and using a variety of powers unlocked using themed costumes.

Balan Wonderworld is the debut project of Balan Company, a subsidiary brand of Square Enix led by Yuji Naka, co-creator of the Sonic the Hedgehog and Nights into Dreams series during his tenure at Sega's Sonic Team. Development began in 2018; it was Naka's first collaboration with artist Naoto Ohshima since Sonic Adventure (1998). The aesthetic was based on musical theater, and Naka studied the hero's journey when creating the story draft.

The story was written by novelist Soushi Kawasaki. The music, composed by Ryo Yamazaki and Hironori Anazawa, emulates musical scores and includes vocals from West End performers such as Laura Pitt-Pulford. The cutscenes were created by Visual Works. There were subsequent claims from Naka and other employees regarding internal conflict around the quality and marketing.

Balan Wonderworld was released worldwide for Nintendo Switch, PlayStation 4, PlayStation 5, Windows, Xbox One, and Xbox Series X/S on March 26, 2021. It received generally negative reviews and underperformed commercially. Critics panned its gameplay and level design, although some praised its graphics and music. Square Enix also published a novelization by Kawasaki.

== Gameplay ==
Gameplay from Balan Wonderworld; the player character (centre) uses a costume ability to traverse the environment.

Balan Wonderworld is a platform game in which players take on the role of either Leo Craig or Emma Cole, two children drawn into the magical realm of Wonderworld by a being called Balan. The game plays out across twelve multi-level areas called Chapters. In the beginning, only the first chapter is available. Collecting items called Balan Statues in each area will unlock Chapters. Within each chapter, Leo and Emma must navigate through a sandbox environment, searching areas for collectables and solving puzzles to progress to the end of the level. Collectables include Balan Statues and crystalline objects called Drops. A simple control scheme is used, with two buttons used to change between costumes, and other actions aside from character and camera movement mapped to all other buttons. During exploration, enemies called Negati will appear and attack the player character. Each chapter ends with a boss battle themed after the Chapter's environment and narrative. The adaptive difficulty adjusts the number and types of enemies based on player performance both on the initial playthrough and return playthroughs of stages.

While exploring, Leo and Emma find costumes from the cast of each chapter; these are unlocked using collectible keys. Costumes grant abilities such as hovering, navigating particular hazards and paths, or fighting enemies. When not wearing a costume, Leo and Emma's only available actions are jumping and basic movement. 80 costumes are spread throughout the stages, some of them in secret locations. Only three costumes can be held at a time; when a fourth costume is acquired, the costume it replaces is sent into a costume bank which can be accessed at checkpoints. Receiving damage, or falling off the edge of the environment, causes the equipped costume to disappear. If the player character is hit without a costume, they are ejected from the Chapter.

Minigames can be unlocked and played within each chapter using special costumes, such as a football-themed challenge. A recurring minigame activated by finding a top hat in levels is Balan's Bout. Taking on the role of Balan, players engage in a series of quick time events, matching Balan's poses with button presses. Performance is ranked, with the best performance rewarding a Balan Statue upon first completion, and multiplying the current Drop total. Chapters can also be played in two-player local co-op multiplayer. Taking on the roles of Leo and Emma, the players can combine costume abilities to simplify puzzles and open potential new pathways through levels.

Chapters are accessed through the hub world, the Isle of Tims, a floating island inhabited by the birdlike Tim creatures. In the hub, players can feed Tims with Drops collected in levels, changing their color and consequently their abilities; for example, red Tims aid in fights, while pink Tims recover hidden items. Tim eggs can be found in Chapters, growing the number of Tims in the hub. By picking up a Tim, the player can take it onto a stage. A special construction is the Tower of Tims, which is grown using mechanisms powered by the Tims. After completing the game, a new third stage is unlocked for each chapter, featuring more difficult environments and new costumes.

== Synopsis ==
Balan Wonderworld mostly takes place in the Balan Theater, a magical realm overseen by a mysterious being called Balan. The Balan Theater appears when one's heart loses its balance, and connects to Wonderworld, a realm merging reality and fantasy created from memories and hearts. The protagonists are two troubled children called Leo and Emma. Leo isolates himself from social contact due to an argument with a friend years before, while Emma suffers from anxiety about what others might be saying behind her back. Both are drawn into the Balan Theater, and travel through twelve worlds (also called "stages") born from the hearts of troubled adults and children alike. Leo and Emma are opposed by Lance, a counterpart to Balan who commands the Negati, monsters born from the darkness of Wonderworld's visitors, who seeks to keep the visitors forever, and who is responsible for the stages.

Each of the twelve worlds is preceded by a cutscene that explains why each of the people trapped in Wonderworld, and when the boss is beaten, a second cutscene is played that explains what happened after. Each boss is in reality the person whose heart created the stage, and the world reflects this. By defeating a boss, the respective person is freed from Lance's influence.

After completing all twelve worlds and freeing their inhabitants of their burdens, Balan opens a portal for the chosen character to fight Lance. Upon his defeat, Lance is briefly shown in his true, less menacing, form before the Negati drag him into their realm. Balan then bids farewell to all of Wonderworld's visitors, though Leo and Emma's farewell is touching enough that he sheds a tear and shows them his real form; a human-like being similar to Lance in appearance. Leo and Emma are returned to the real world and face their problems; Leo connects with a dancing group he had previously shunned, while Emma learns of a birthday party thrown for her that her servants were keeping secret. The ending credits show stills of Wonderworld's visitors reuniting in the real world watched over by Balan.

== Development ==
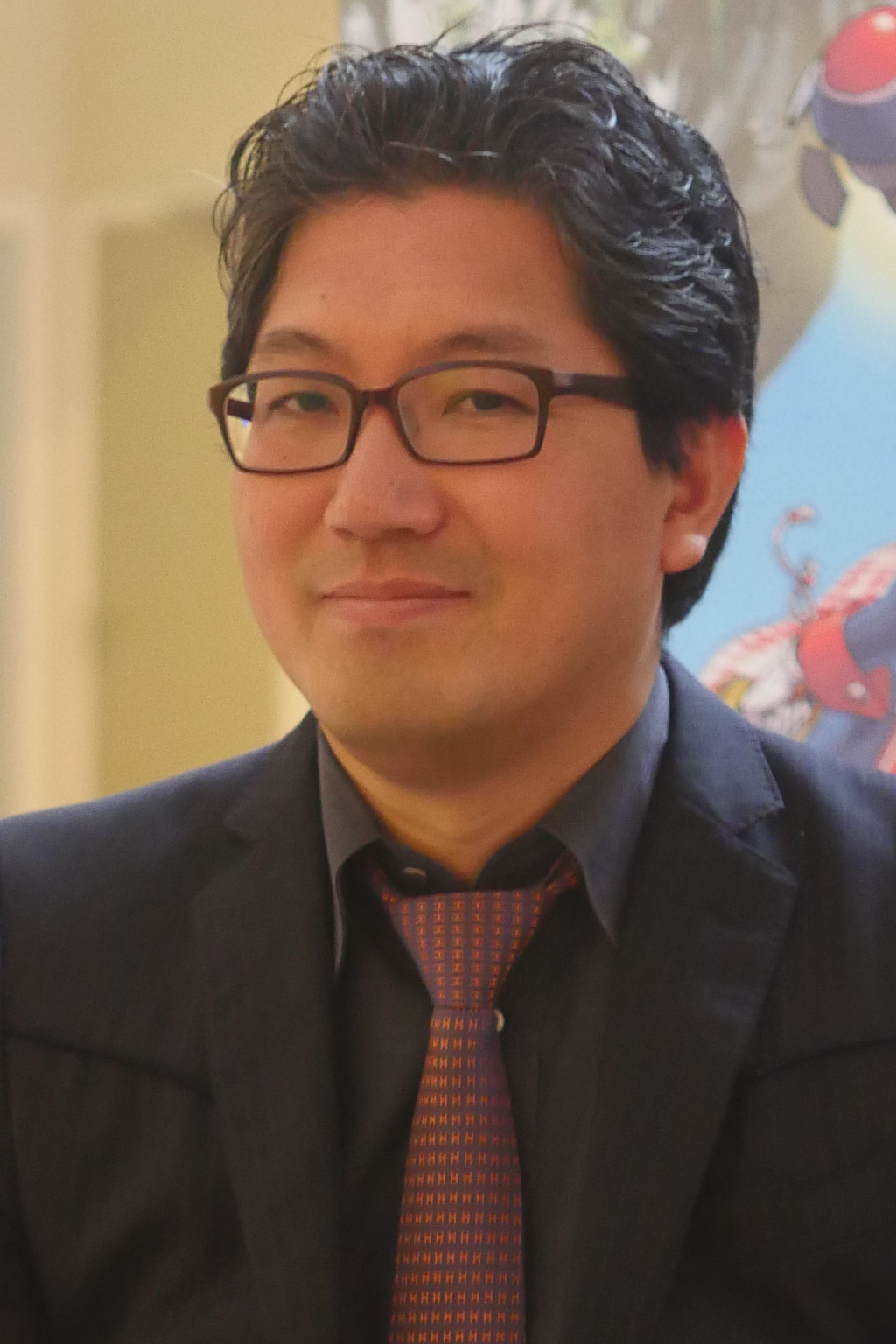
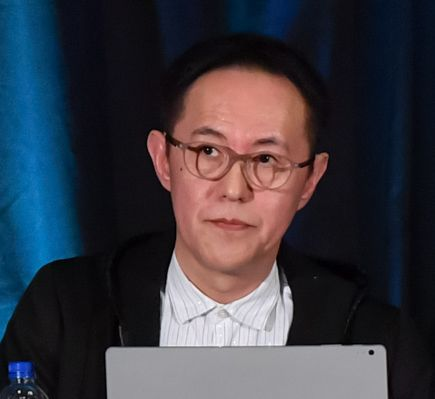
Balan Wonderworld was the first collaboration between director Yuji Naka and artist Naoto Ohshima since Sonic Adventure (1998).

Balan Wonderworld is the debut project from Balan Company, a Square Enix subsidiary brand founded in 2018 by Sonic the Hedgehog and Nights into Dreams creator Yuji Naka to bring together internal and external production staff. Naka described Balan Company as a collective of designers and artists focusing on genres outside the norms of Square Enix. It was developed by Arzest, a company which had previously co-developed multiple projects for Nintendo and Mistwalker. A key Arzest member was Naoto Ohshima, an ex-Sega artist who designed the characters Sonic the Hedgehog and Doctor Eggman. When Naka joined Square Enix in January 2018, he considered making social mobile games but was encouraged by Shinji Hashimoto to make action games for the new market, which was seeing a resurgence in classic action and platform games. Naka approached Ohshima and Arzest about a collaboration. It was the first collaboration between Naka and Ohshima since Sonic Adventure in 1998.

Naka was given the go-ahead for the project by Square Enix due to his experience with platforming and action games but was told it was his "one chance" at the genre with them. The game was described as a fusion of multiple popular styles of platform games aimed at as wide an audience as possible. Describing their approach to production, Ohshima compared it to an earlier less structured style, where features and adjustments continued past the halfway point of production. Development began in July 2018. The game was co-produced by Ohshima and Square Enix's Noriyoshi Fujimoto. Late in development, the team shifted to working remotely due to the COVID-19 pandemic.

Naka said that he was removed as director six months before the release after complaining over its state, and that Arzest had submitted it with unaddressed bugs. He said the decision to remove him was made by the producer and other senior product staff. Naka felt Balan Wonderworld was released in an unfinished state. In a report following Naka's 2022 arrest for insider trading, an anonymous employee said Naka made unreasonable work demands, wanted Arzest to work an additional two months unpaid to address his problems, and treated staff abusively during the conflicts prior to his removal.

=== Design ===
Balan Wonderworld was produced for Nintendo Switch, PlayStation 4, PlayStation 5, Windows, Xbox One, and Xbox Series X/S. Fujimoto said the team was "carried away" by the power of next-generation consoles, wanting to add more features as production advanced. It was made available on a wide range of platforms, allowing for the largest possible audience. It also notably targeted a wide audience including children when other producers for next-generation hardware were mostly aimed at an adult audience. The design proposal included the 80 costume count as a hook, and Naka was sure he would need to halve the number as production went on. In the end and to his surprise, he was able to create all 80. During the concept stages, Ohshima created 120 concept costumes, narrowing it down to 80. He later said that as the 80 costumes were a core element, reducing the number would have shifted the design. The team tied a single action to each costume to give them relevance, with only one button command so the younger players the team was targeting as part of their audience would not get confused. Later in development, the team incorporated the DualSense controller's haptic feedback.

The process of creating the different costume's single actions was difficult for the team, especially as they wanted to leave players the freedom of challenging themselves to complete levels with a particular costume or set of costumes. The character models of each level's "cast" vanished when approached so players would not mistake them for enemies, while also playing into the themes of each world. The penalty for taking damage was made minimal so players would not be discouraged from experimentation. Balancing the different costumes and fitting them into each stage to preserve challenge was one of the hardest aspects of development. In the middle of development, the co-op mode was suggested as an entertaining addition, further complicating production. The difficulty scaling, which adjusted both combat difficulty and item placement based on player actions, was handled by a meta AI designed by Yoichiro Miyake, a Square Enix employee specialising in game AI. Bug testing caused trouble as it was unclear whether the game code, the engine development kit, or the platform-specific version was the one in need of attention. Ohshima attributed their successes with finding bugs to Square Enix's resources.

The team chose Unreal Engine 4 due to its wide multiplatform support, with a dedicated version of the game being created for each platform. The technical director, Koichi Watanabe, made adjustments to the engine, replacing most of its original Blueprint Visual Scripting with C++ to speed up processing, though this caused problems getting the reworked engine working across its platforms. They also needed to cope with updates to the engine software, with Watanabe collaborating with Epic Games to incorporate his customization alongside the updates. The Steam version caused its own issues due to needing a keyboard option, and the wider variety of graphical options compared to home consoles. After transitioning to remote working during 2020, the team cooperated with Epic Games to have access to the Unreal development environment, having separate environments for the Windows and next-generation console versions.

The cinematics were created by Square Enix's CGI subsidiary Visual Works, directed by Kazuyuki Ikumori. Ohshima revealed the original plan did not include CGI scenes, but Visual Works wanted to be part of the project, and Ohshima created rough storyboards from which the studio designed the cinematics. When creating the cinematics, they combined the "cool" style of Final Fantasy with more cartoonish Dragon Quest aesthetics. This allowed for both emotional depth in expressions and an aesthetic that would appeal to younger audiences. Due to its musical elements, special attention was paid to synchronizing the movements and lighting with the musical score. Due to the ability to choose the ethnicity of Leo and Emma, which were reflected in all cutscenes, Square Enix partnered with CRI Middleware to provide graphical software. CRI Middleware customized one of their software tools to adjust each character's hair and skin tones based on choice within both real-time and CGI scenes without taking up space with tailored cutscenes for each choice.

=== Story and art design ===
Naka had never considered narrative important, but story held an important place in Square Enix's brand identity. To help create the story, he read up on the hero's journey and created a narrative told without dialogue. The script was written by Soushi Kawasaki, a novelist known in Japan for his work on the Long Arm detective series. Brought in by Ohshima, he was asked to create between thirty and forty different stories, from which Ohshima picked twelve, commenting that many of the rejected ones had darker tones. Once the twelve were decided, Kawasaki elaborated on each story, then Ohshima worked to portray them visually through the environmental design and cutscenes. While considering the setting and story, Naka decided on a similar design approach to Nights into Dreams, though otherwise Balan Wonderworld was an original work. The world of Balan Wonderworld used a fictional language based on English; dialogue and song lyrics were first written in English, then the sounds and syllables were changed and pronunciation adjusted to make it sound odd. The voice cast was Japanese; Balan was voiced by Kenichi Suzumura, Leo by Shimba Tsuchiya, Emma by Lynn, and Lance by Takahiro Sakurai.

The world design was themed after musical theatre. This theme was chosen to better fit within Square Enix's catalogue. The style drew heavy inspiration from the Cirque du Soleil. For Balan's design, Ohshima began with the concepts of theatrical troupe leader and a grin showing under a large hat, emphasising his theatrical and mysterious elements. The use of a theater as the main location followed the musical theater theme. A recurring visual and narrative element was the balance between positive and negative emotions in the mind. The costumes were created by Ohshima and other artists at Arzest. One of those artists was Yono Endo, who created stylized poster artwork used for promotion. Under Ohshima's oversight, Endo created the designs for Leo, Emma, most of the Tims, and Lance. Ohshima wanted Endo to add an additional Japanese aesthetic, as his own art had received feedback for lacking a distinct regional style. The art director was Masamichi Harada. When creating his designs, Ohshima decided to deliberately evoke his earlier work with Naka, with their design intended to look pleasing both on the cast and when worn by the protagonists. Each chapter's main character and story were designed first, followed by the character's cast, which represents their positive emotions.

=== Music ===
The music was primarily composed by Ryo Yamazaki, whose previous work includes the Front Mission and Final Fantasy Crystal Chronicles series. Naka came to Yamazaki with the key theme of a "mysterious and fantastical musical." Unsure of Naka's meaning, Yamazaki went through a trial-and-error period to finalize the musical style. Early demos were heavily influenced by the music of Cirque du Soleil, in addition to musical-inspired soundtracks including Charlie and the Chocolate Factory and The Greatest Showman. Following the early positive reception by staff, he was allowed creative freedom with the score. His goal was to make it easy to understand and catchy, while including the theme of understanding and balancing emotions. His recurring design perspective was of the audience of a musical show enjoying the spectacle on stage. The mysterious elements were inspired by reading stories by the Brothers Grimm, and each stage theme was directly inspired by the concept art and playing early builds.

The musical numbers concluding levels were written first, going through the most trial and error due to their context and the need to synchronize the motion capture performances to them. The stage themes proved challenging to create, using themes and motifs drawn from production artwork for them. Yamazaki's favorite track was "The Lady Too Scared to Love". Due to its ice motif and sad narrative theme, the original concept was for dark music. After seeing the level, which reminded him of winter sports, the music was rewritten from scratch to be upbeat. In keeping with the visuals and themes, the music included vocal contributions from West End singers. On the recommendation of composer Youki Yamamoto, singer Laura Pitt-Pulford was brought on board along with many associated singers. Yamazaki described Pitt-Pulford as "the perfect match" due to her style and previous experience recording vocals for the anime adaptation of Dr. Stone. Lead vocals were performed by Pitt-Pulford and George Blagden. The vocals used the fictional language to maintain the mysterious atmosphere. English versions were recorded and included as a bonus for players who collected all Balan Statues in a level. Due to the COVID-19 pandemic, Yamazaki had to work remotely during the entire recording process.

A soundtrack album was released on March 31, 2021. Covering 93 tracks across three CDs of music, the album was released physically and digitally in Japan, and digitally worldwide. While uncredited in-game, the album credits Hironori Anazawa on multiple cutscene-specific tracks. A digital mini-album, featuring the opening tracks and additional collaboration tracks with online musician Marasy, was released for free on March 15.

== Release ==
Balan Wonderworld was revealed in July 2020. It was released worldwide on March 26, 2021. The PlayStation, Xbox, and Switch versions saw physical and digital releases, while the PC version was a digital exclusive through Steam; the Xbox version was only available digitally in Japan. Bug testing was a high priority and troubling, as when a bug was found it had to be individually corrected for each platform version. Kawasaki wrote a novelization, Balan Wonderworld: Maestro of Mystery, Theater of Wonder, released digitally on March 26 through Square Enix's publishing imprints. The novelization adds context to some events and characters. Lance was the former master of Wonderworld before being overwhelmed by negative human emotion, creating Balan as a replacement. Visitors to Wonderworld are drawn from various time periods and locations around the world, and normally lose their memories upon leaving. The novel ends with Balan allowing the visitors to retain their memories, vowing not to become like Lance.

A demo, including the entire first chapter and the first levels of Chapters 4 and 6, was released on January 27. Naka's later comments revealed the demo was delayed at Fujimoto's request, though Naka was critical of this as he claimed Fujimoto initially decided the "tight" development schedule initially. While progress did not carry over into the main game, save data from the demo unlocked a special costume themed after each platform. The demo was taken down on April 14 for consoles, and the following day on Steam. Reception of the demo was generally mixed; while many praised the art style and music, several faulted the control and camera. While it was too late for major adjustments, Square Enix created a day-one patch to address camera and character movement problems, and alter the difficulty to make later bosses more challenging. The patch also fixed a bug involving flashes of light in the final boss which raised concerns about epileptic seizures, causing Square Enix to warn players to install the patch before playing. According to IGN reviewer Tom Marks, Square Enix did not provide advance copies to reviewers.

Shortly after the release, Naka resigned from Square Enix and contemplated retirement. He later announced that his next game would be an independent mobile project under Prope. In late April 2022, he said that the Balan Wonderworld producer had removed him from the project six months before its release, due to the state of development and the use of a fan cover of Balan music without due credit to the composer during marketing. He had sued Square Enix after his firing and accused Square Enix and Arzest of not caring about consumers. In July, Naka posted a photo of the Nights development team with Ohshima erased, and aired further grievances about his treatment on Balan Wonderworld. It was later alleged that the lawsuit was dismissed following information regarding Naka's behavior.

== Reception ==
Reception

Aggregate scores
Aggregator	Score
Metacritic	NS: 36/100; PC: 38/100; PS4: 44/100; PS5: 51/100; XSXS: 47/100
OpenCritic	9% recommend

Review scores
Publication	Score
Destructoid	5.5/10
Easy Allies	4.5/10
Famitsu	30/40
GameSpot	5/10
Hardcore Gamer	2/5
IGN	4/10
Nintendo Life	3/10
Nintendo World Report	3/10
Push Square	3/10
Shacknews	6/10
Video Games Chronicle	2/5

Balan Wonderworld received "generally unfavorable" reviews for most platforms, according to review aggregator Metacritic; the PlayStation 5 version received "mixed or average" reviews. Fellow review aggregator OpenCritic assessed that the game received weak approval, being recommended by 9% of critics. Attention was drawn to suspicious positive review bombing on the Metacritic pages.

The Japanese magazine Famitsu praised the aesthetics and music, but found the gameplay mechanics tedious. Eurogamer's Martin Robinson felt it was too faithful to older platformers from the period of Nights into Dreams, carrying over problems unacceptable to modern gamers. CJ Andriessen of Destructoid said Balan Wonderworld had nostalgic appeal for fans of early experimental 3D platformers, but its gameplay and minigames lowered its quality for a modern audience. Bradley Ellis of Easy Allies described it as "bizarre and disappointing" despite some heart and the high-profile developers. GameSpot's David Wildgoose said it seemed out of its time, faulting its archaic design despite providing some platforming challenges.

Tom Marks of IGN cited Balan Wonderworld as an example of an underwhelming spiritual successor, calling it boring rather than actually broken. Both Mitch Vogel of Nintendo Life and John Rairdin of Nintendo World Report were negative; Vogel called it "a waste of time", while Rairdin was disappointed by its poor use of genre mechanics. Chris Scullion of Video Games Chronicle likened it to a PlayStation 2 platformer and was mixed on the usefulness of the costumes.

The one-button gameplay was generally seen as a disappointment. Bradley and Marks praised the boss battles. Andriessen and Wildgoose felt later levels were of a higher quality. The costume system was criticized for the number of repeated abilities and the restriction of jumping to particular costumes given the genre, though Wildgoose praised their variety. The minigames, particularly Balan's Bout, were panned. Several writers criticized the lack of a clear narrative or solid gameplay explanations. The Tims were also faulted as a useless addition. The Switch version was noted for noticeable technical problems. By comparison, the graphics were cited as a positive for their design and aesthetics, and the CGI cutscenes and music met with general praise.

=== Sales ===
Balan Wonderworld sold poorly in Japan; it sold fewer than 2,100 physical copies in its opening week, and failed to make multiple sales charts. In the United Kingdom, it failed to break into the top 40 bestselling games for March. It failed to appear among the top-selling games in the United States in March, though another Square Enix-published game, Outriders, had strong sales. It was not mentioned in Square Enix's fiscal report.
