= Yuji Naka =

Japanese video game designer (born 1965)

- 中 裕司
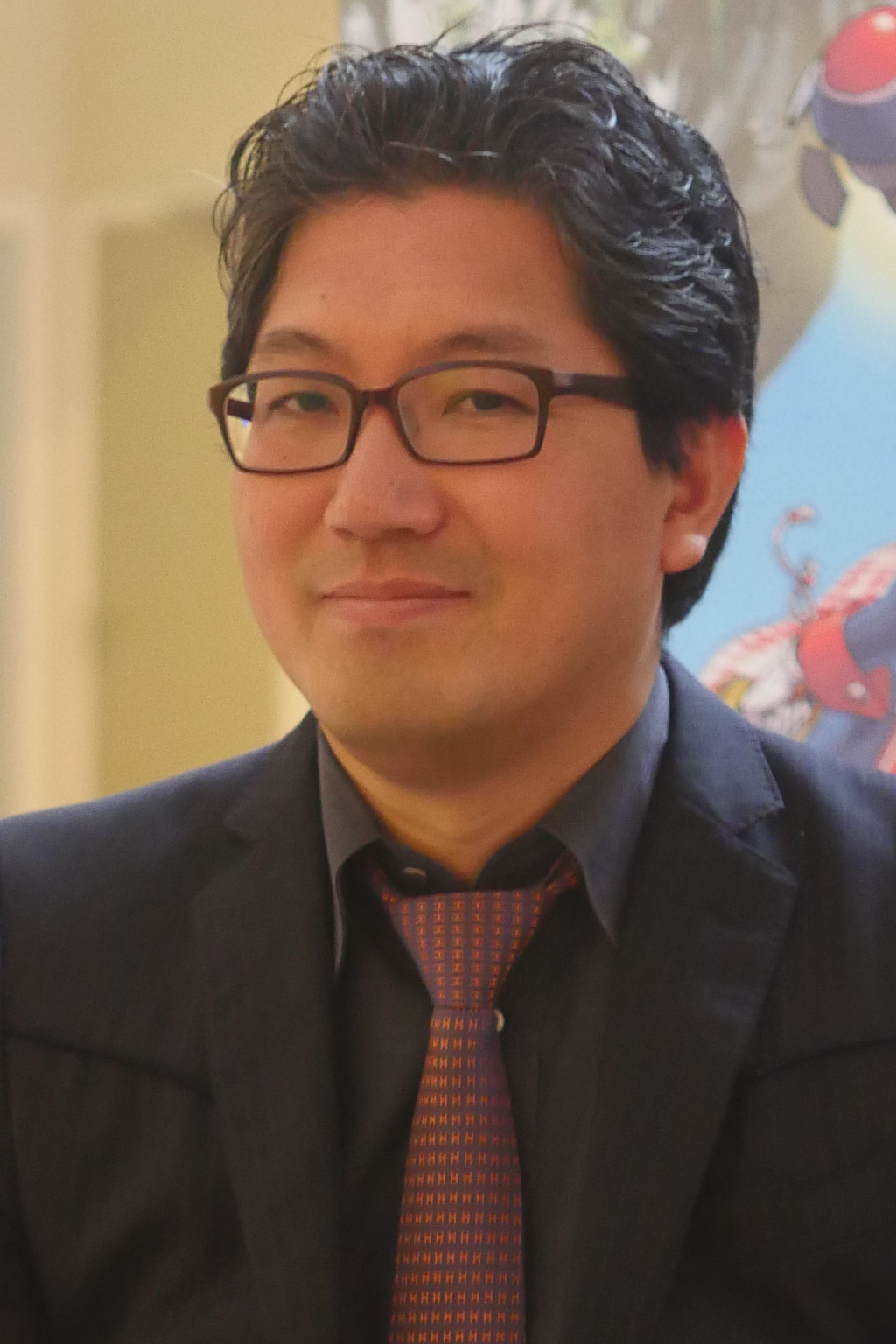
- Naka in 2015
- Born: September 17, 1965 (age 61); Hirakata, Osaka, Japan
- Other name: YU2
- Occupations: Game designer; producer; programmer
- Years active: 1984–2022
- Employers: Sega (1984–2006); Prope (2006–2022); Square Enix (2018–2021)
- Known for: Sonic the Hedgehog series; Phantasy Star series; Nights into Dreams

Yuji Naka (中 裕司, Naka Yūji; born September 17, 1965), sometimes credited as YU2, is a Japanese former video game designer and programmer. He is the co-creator of the Sonic the Hedgehog series and was the president of Sonic Team at Sega until his departure in 2006.

Naka joined Sega in 1984 and worked on games including Girl's Garden (1985) and Phantasy Star II (1989). He was the lead programmer of the original Sonic games on the Mega Drive in the early 1990s, which greatly increased Sega's market share. After developing Sonic the Hedgehog (1991) in Japan, Naka moved to California to develop Sonic the Hedgehog 2 (1992), Sonic the Hedgehog 3 (1994) and Sonic & Knuckles (1994) with Sega Technical Institute.

Naka returned to Japan to lead development on Sonic Team games including Nights into Dreams (1996), Burning Rangers (1998), Sonic Adventure (1998) and Phantasy Star Online (2000). After Sega left the console market in 2001, Naka remained as an executive officer and oversaw its output for the next five years.

In 2006, Naka left Sega and founded the independent game company Prope. He joined Square Enix to direct the platform game Balan Wonderworld (2021), which reunited him with the Sonic co-creator Naoto Ohshima. Naka said he was removed from the project six months before Balan Wonderworld was released, and it underperformed critically and commercially. He left Square Enix in April 2021. In 2023, Naka was found guilty of insider trading at Square Enix.

== Early life ==
Naka was born on September 17, 1965, in Hirakata, Osaka. He learned to program by replicating and debugging video game code printed in magazines. The experience prompted him to study assemblers and practice writing code during his school classes. After graduating, he decided to stay in Osaka rather than enroll in university.

== Career ==
=== 1983–1989: Beginnings at Sega ===
Around 1983, Naka saw that the video game company Sega was looking for programming assistants and applied. Following a brief interview, he began working for Sega in April 1984. His first task was designing maps and checking floppy disks for Lode Runner for the SG-1000; he could not recall if the game was released. His first major project was Girl's Garden (1985), which he and the composer Hiroshi Kawaguchi created as part of their training process. Their boss was impressed and decided to publish the game, and it earned them notice among their peers and Japanese gamers. Naka felt embarrassed about his code, and did not want to release the game. He developed games going with the flow, and did not do task management at all. The pace of game development was 1 game every one or two months, and he was essentially living at the company; he recalled bragging with Yu Suzuki on who worked more overtime.

During the Master System era, Naka wanted to develop games that were not possible on Nintendo's Famicom. Examples of this include the 3D dungeons of Phantasy Star and ports of Space Harrier and OutRun, which ran on powerful arcade hardware. The Mega Drive was introduced suddenly, much like the Master System. It was only around the 32X's release in 1994 that Sega gave Naka information about hardware beforehand. Super Thunder Blade was the first game he programmed for the Mega Drive. He requested that sprite-scaling be implemented in future models of the console. However, he was told that it was not possible at the time. He also requested a 6Mbit cartridge for Phantasy Star II, which was approved. The Mega Drive was Naka's favourite hardware, and he said that he could have kept working on it forever just by making the clock speed faster.

During a visit to the 1988 Amusement Machines Show, Naka was impressed by the ability to move diagonally on slopes in a demonstration of Capcom's game Ghouls 'n Ghosts. Hoping to recreate it, he asked his supervisors at Sega to allow him to port the game to the Mega Drive. Capcom provided him with the source code and ROM data. As he was developing the port, he experimented with aspects such as the speed of the main character to understand how they interacted with the environment. He also altered the slopes and was able to create a functioning 360-degree loop. Sprite-scaling was still a technique that Naka wanted to improve his skill on with a game called Metal Lancer, but it was cancelled halfway through development.

=== 1989–1991: Sonic the Hedgehog ===
Sega's president Hayao Nakayama decided that Sega needed a flagship series and mascot to compete with Nintendo's Mario franchise. Of Naka's numerous development plans, "a game to beat Super Mario", caught a superior's attention. Naka created a prototype platform game that involved a fast-moving character rolling in a ball through a long winding tube. The idea for a hedgehog that could roll into a ball by jumping and attacking enemies came from his high school notebook, and he was unsure whether to use it. This concept was expanded out with character design by Naoto Ohshima and levels conceived by Hirokazu Yasuhara. Naka hoped to showcase the Mega Drive's processing speed through fast and exhilarating gameplay. Part of his approach was based on his experience playing through the original Super Mario Bros (1985); he wondered why he could not complete each level faster the better he became at playing the game. The development took longer than any game Naka worked on before, and he worked only on this game for approximately a year and a half.

Sonic the Hedgehog was released in 1991 and received acclaim; it greatly increased the popularity of the Sega Genesis in North America, and is credited with helping Sega gain 65% of the market share against Nintendo. Naka was dissatisfied at Sega, feeling he received little credit for the success, and quit.

=== 1991–1994: Sonic sequels and time in California ===
Naka rejoined Sega when he was hired by Mark Cerny to work at Sega Technical Institute (STI) in California, with a higher salary and more creative freedom. At STI, Naka led development on Sonic the Hedgehog 2, released in 1992. It was another major success, but its development suffered from the language barrier and cultural differences between the Japanese and American developers. The artist Craig Stitt described Naka as "an arrogant pain in the ass" who was not interested in working with Americans. Another artist, Tim Skelly, said that Naka would have been happier working with an all-Japanese team. As Naka refused to develop another Sonic game with the American staff, he formed a Japanese-only team at STI and developed Sonic the Hedgehog 3 and Sonic & Knuckles, both released in 1994.

=== 1994–1998: Return to Japan and Sega Saturn ===
Following the release of Sonic & Knuckles, Naka returned to Japan, having been offered a role as a producer. As managing director Hisashi Suzuki brought in videotapes of Virtua Racing and Virtua Fighter, Naka was so impressed that it partly contributed to him going back to Japan. With Naka's return, Sonic Team was officially formed as a brand, and began work on a new intellectual property, Nights into Dreams (1996), for Sega's 32-bit Saturn console. Naka did not have any desire to develop for the 32X, and was disappointed that the Saturn was not true 3D. Observing the development environment he did not want to make a Sonic game right away, and instead created Nights. He persuaded his superiors that Nights would only take one year and that he would work on a 3D Sonic in 1997. However, the development took longer than expected. Naka regretted that he was not able to deliver a Sonic game for the Saturn, as this was often cited as a reason for the console's failure.

Meanwhile, in America, STI worked on Sonic X-treme, a 3D Sonic game. Development was hindered by numerous setbacks, culminating in its cancellation in 1996. Reportedly, Naka contributed to the cancellation by refusing to let STI use the Nights game engine and threatening to quit. The X-treme developer Chris Senn dismissed the story as speculation but said that, if true, he understood Naka's interest in maintaining control over the Sonic Team technology and the Sonic franchise. Sonic Team was developing its own 3D Sonic game using the Nights engine, which could have motivated Naka's threat. In July 2022, Naka denied that he had anything to do with X-treme's use of the Nights engine and said it would have been useless because Nights was coded in assembly and X-treme was in C. He suggested that the developers invented the story to rationalize their failure to finish X-treme.

=== 1998–2001: Dreamcast ===
While Sonic Adventure was in development for the Saturn, Naka was involved with planning Sega's next console, the Dreamcast, as early as 1996. Sonic Team proposed the name "G-Cube". Naka also proposed a multimedia concept that involved talking to a built in microphone to switch TV channels, a mode of communication later used in the Dreamcast game Seaman.

In 1998, prior to the launch of Dreamcast, Naka and his team visited Sega of America to tour their development offices and observe their work on the game Geist Force, a rail shooter for Dreamcast. According to the producer Mark Subotnick, Naka told his team in Japanese which parts they would take to incorporate in Sonic games and suggested firing all but one of the engineers. Unbeknownst to Naka, several of the Geist Force developers understood Japanese and quit, contributing to the project's cancellation.

Shortly after the Japanese launch of the Dreamcast and Sonic Adventure, Naka was asked by the Sega chairman, Isao Okawa, to develop a flagship online game for the Dreamcast. Originally, Naka was unenthusiastic about the idea given his team's inexperience with creating online games. However, the other Sega development studios were preoccupied with their own projects, such as the Sakura Wars series and Jet Set Radio (2000). Naka and his team saw the creation of an online game for Japan, a nation of console gamers, as a serious challenge, akin to creating a new genre. This was further complicated by the perception of online games in the late 1990s having boring visuals and the per-minute fee for dial-up internet in Japan.

Naka split his team into three groups, all serving different purposes, before rejoining to develop Phantasy Star Online (2001). Two groups were focused on discovering the limits of the Dreamcast's capabilities, specifically in terms of graphical fidelity and the possibilities of online play on the system. The other group would work on various projects under Naka's supervision that would lead them closer to their goal. This would culminate with the release of Sonic Team's Chu Chu Rocket (1999), an action-puzzle game and the first game for the system to support online console gaming. Additionally, it was the only game directed by Naka at Sega as he would move on to become a producer, overseeing output from Sonic Team. Following Chu Chu Rocket's release, all three teams collaborated on the development of Phantasy Star Online. It is reported that after Okawa became ill in 2000, Naka would send reports to the hospital, updating him on the team's progress.

In 2000, Sega began to restructure its development operations as part of the dissolution of Sega Enterprises, transforming its arcade and console studios into semi-autonomous subsidiary companies. While each studio was given an unprecedented amount of creative freedom, Naka felt it important to preserve the Sonic Team brand name, and therefore the legal name of the company was SONICTEAM, Ltd. Naka was installed as the CEO of the new company.

=== 2001–2006: Final years at Sega ===
In March 2001, Sega discontinued the Dreamcast and left the video game hardware market. Sega's semi-autonomous entities were reabsorbed, including Sonic Team. Naka remained as an executive officer, overseeing all of Sega's output until his departure in 2006. According to the former Sega producer Takashi Yuda, senior Sega figures including Toshihiro Nagoshi and Yu Suzuki were reporting to Naka.

In late 2001 or early 2002, Peter Moore, the president of Sega of America, arranged focus groups with teenagers and found that Sega's reputation was declining. According to Moore, Naka responded angrily and accused Moore of having falsified the findings. According to Sega's marketing executive Mike Fischer, Naka believed in a "Disney-esque family wholesome environment" and put Nintendo "on a pedestal".

After Sega left the hardware market, Sonic Team began developing for consoles by other manufacturers; Naka became fond of the Nintendo GameCube. He regretted that he did not bring Phantasy Star Online to the PlayStation 2, as Monster Hunter (2004) became popular.

=== 2006–2016: Prope ===
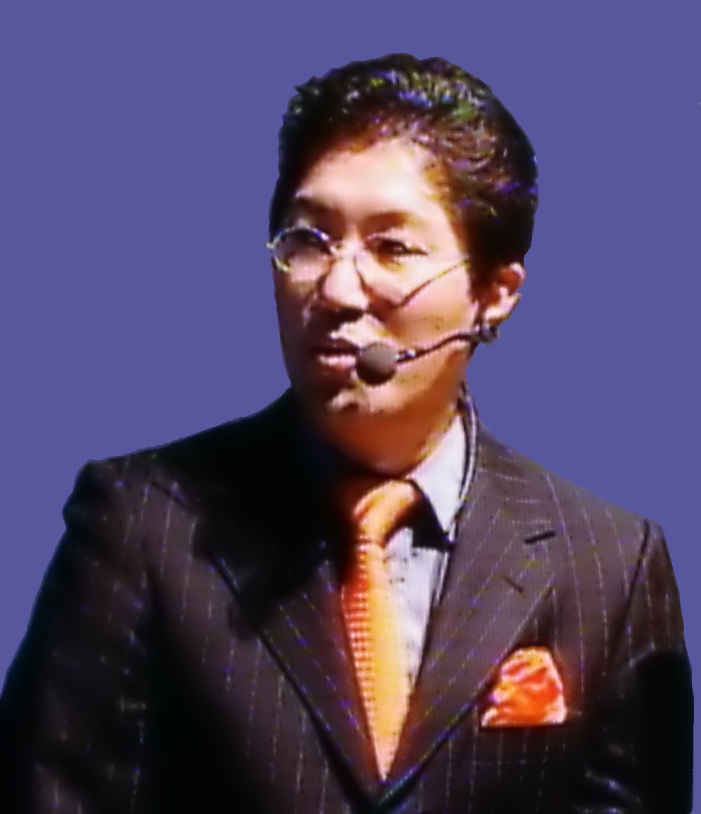
Naka during the 2008 Tokyo Game Show

On March 16, 2006, Naka announced that he would leave Sega to create his own game studio, Prope. He said he considered it a benefit to be able to create games other than Sonic the Hedgehog games. Naka also explained that the video game industry was young, leading to quick promotions; he felt his senior position had given him less time to be close to development. The last Sonic game Naka was involved was Sonic the Hedgehog (2006). He regretted leaving Sega during the middle of its development as it was poorly received.

Naka and Prope developed small games for the Wii and mobile devices, such as Wii Play: Motion and Ivy the Kiwi?. This included a reunion with Sega as they published Let's Tap and Let's Catch for the Wii. Naka explained that while it was uncommon in the west, he maintained a strong relationship with the company despite his departure. During this time, Naka also voiced a fictionalized version of himself in the Sega-themed anime series Hi-sCoool! SeHa Girls, though his identity was concealed under the alias "Center-sensei" until the final episode.

The games helped finance their first large-scale production, Rodea the Sky Soldier, which finished development in 2011 but was not released until 2015. According to Naka, the publisher, Kadokawa Games, would not release the game until they developed a version for the Nintendo 3DS. Following the launch of the Nintendo Wii U in 2012, Kadakowa opted to create a Wii U version based on the 3DS version, delaying it until 2015. In November 2015, Kadokawa Games released Rodea the Sky Soldier on the 3DS and Wii U, while packaging Naka and Prope's Wii version as bonus bundled with the initial print of the Wii U version. In response, Naka used his social media following to request people prioritize playing the Wii version. Naka was awarded with the Bizkaia Award at the Fun & Serious Game Festival in 2016.

=== 2016–2022: Square Enix and Balan Wonderworld ===
In 2018, Naka joined Square Enix to form the subsidiary developer Balan Company, which aimed to facilitate collaboration between internal and external staff. Naka described Balan Company as a collective of designers and artists focusing on genres outside the norms of Square Enix. Prope remained in business, but with Naka its only employee.

Balan Company's first game, Balan Wonderworld, was co-developed by Arzest, a company which had previously co-developed multiple projects for Nintendo and Mistwalker. A key staff member at Arzest was Naoto Ohshima, a former Sega artist who created the designs for Sonic the Hedgehog and Doctor Eggman. When Naka joined Square Enix in January 2018, he considered making social mobile games, but was encouraged by Shinji Hashimoto to make action games for the new market, which was seeing a resurgence in classic action and platform games. Naka approached Ohshima about a collaboration, their first since Sonic Adventure in 1998.

Following disagreements with staff, Naka was removed from the project approximately six months before Balan Wonderworld was released. It received generally negative reviews and underperformed commercially. Naka left Square Enix in April 2021. On December 22, 2021, Naka released a free mobile game, Shot2048, similar to the games 2048 and Chain Cube.

Naka announced his departure from Square Enix in April 2022. He said he had attempted to negotiate to address problems with Balan Wonderworld, but was ignored, and said Square Enix and Arzest did not "value games or game fans". In July, Naka tweeted a photo of the Nights team with Ohshima's face blacked out, and expressed his anger over Balan Wonderworld. An anonymous employee said Naka had made unreasonable demands, wanted Arzest to work an additional two months unpaid to address his problems, and treated staff abusively.

=== 2022: Insider trading charges ===
On November 17, 2022, Naka was arrested by the Tokyo District Public Prosecutors Office and charged with violating the Financial Instruments and Exchange Act of 2006. The Public Prosecutors Office accused him of insider trading; Naka bought 10,000 shares of the developer Aiming before its game Dragon Quest Tact was announced to the public. Two other former Square Enix employees were also arrested, alleged to have bought 162,000 shares between December 2019 and February 2020 for approximately 47.2 million yen.

On December 7, Naka was arrested again, accused of having purchased 144.7 million yen of shares of the developer ATeam before their game Final Fantasy VII: The First Soldier was announced. He was later indicted on insider trading charges by the Tokyo District Public Prosecutors Office. Naka admitted his guilt in March 2023. On June 1, prosecutors asked for a sentence of two and a half years in prison and a combined fine of 172.5 million yen. On July 7, a Tokyo District Court judge gave Naka a sentence of two years and six months in prison, suspended for four years. The judge ordered him to forfeit 171 million yen and pay a fine of two million yen.

Following the charges, Naka made no public statements for 16 months. In April 2024, he ended his social media hiatus to respond to the news that Yu Miyake, Dragon Quest's executive producer, had been reassigned to Square Enix's mobile division, accusing him of lying during the trial. Miyake was credited as executive officer on Balan Wonderworld.

== Personal life ==
Naka is a racer and car enthusiast, having mentioned his Ferrari 360 Spider in multiple interviews. In November 2004, he competed in round six of the Kumho Tyres Lotus Championship in Tasmania. In April 2022, Naka participated in the first round of the Elise Super Tech competition at the Mobility Resort Motegi circuit, finishing seventh place.

== Works ==
Year	Game	Role
1985	Girl's Garden	Game designer, programmer
1985	Great Baseball	Programmer
1985	F-16 Fighting Falcon (Master System ver.)	Programmer
1986	Black Belt	Programmer
1986	Spy vs. Spy (Master System ver.)	Programmer
1986	Space Harrier (Master System ver.)	Programmer
1987	OutRun (Master System ver.)	Programmer
1987	Phantasy Star	Lead programmer
1989	Phantasy Star II	Producer, lead programmer
1989	Ghouls 'n Ghosts (Genesis ver.)	Programmer
1991	Sonic the Hedgehog	Programmer
1992	Sonic the Hedgehog 2	Chief programmer
1994	Sonic the Hedgehog 3	Producer, lead programmer
1994	Sonic & Knuckles	Producer, lead programmer
1996	Nights into Dreams	Producer, lead programmer
1996	Sonic 3D Blast	Advisor
1997	Sonic Jam	Producer
1997	Sonic R	Producer
1998	Burning Rangers	Producer
1998	Sonic Adventure	Producer
1999	ChuChu Rocket!	Director, producer
1999	Sonic Pocket Adventure	Supervisor
2000	Samba de Amigo	Producer
2000	Phantasy Star Online	Producer
2001	Sonic Adventure 2	Producer
2001	Puyo Pop	Producer
2001	Sonic Advance	Producer
2002	Sonic Mega Collection	Producer
2002	Sonic Advance 2	Producer
2003	Sonic Pinball Party	Producer
2003	Billy Hatcher and the Giant Egg	Producer
2003	Phantasy Star Online Episode III	Producer
2003	Sonic Battle	Producer
2003	Sonic Heroes	Producer
2004	Puyo Pop Fever	Producer
2004	Astro Boy	Chief producer
2004	Sonic Advance 3	Producer
2004	Sega Superstars	Chief producer
2004	Feel the Magic XX/YY	Chief producer
2005	Sakura Wars: So Long, My Love	Chief producer
2005	Bleach Advance: Kurenai ni Somaru Soul Society	Chief producer
2005	Sonic Gems Collection	Chief producer
2005	The Rub Rabbits!	Chief producer
2005	Shadow the Hedgehog	Producer
2005	Sonic Rush	Producer
2005	Puyo Puyo Fever 2	Chief producer
2005	Bleach GC: Tasogare ni Mamieru Shinigami	Chief producer
2006	Bleach: The Blade of Fate	Chief producer
2006	Doraemon: Nobita no Kyouryuu 2006 DS	Chief producer
2006	Sonic Riders	Executive producer
2006	Phantasy Star Universe	Executive producer
2008	Let's Tap	Producer
2009	Let's Catch	Producer
2009	Ivy the Kiwi?	Producer
2011	Wii Play: Motion	Producer
2011	Fishing Resort	Producer
2013	Digimon Adventure	Producer
2013	StreetPass Mansion / Monster Manor	Producer
2014	Digimon All-Star Rumble	Producer
2014	Hi-sCoool! SeHa Girls	Voice acting ("Center-sensei")
2015	Rodea the Sky Soldier (Wii ver.)	Producer
2015	StreetPass Fishing / Ultimate Angler	Producer
2016	StreetPass Chef / Feed Mii	Producer
2017	Legend of Coin	Programmer
2021	Balan Wonderworld	Director
2021	Shot2048	Game designer, programmer
