= Wii Play: Motion =

2011 video game

- North American box bundle featuring a black Wii Remote Plus controller
- Developers: Nintendo SPD: Arzest; CAProduction; Chunsoft; Good-Feel; Mitchell Corporation; NDcube; Nintendo SPD; Prope; Skip Ltd.; Vanpool
- Publisher: Nintendo
- Director: Various: Naoto Ohshima (Arzest) Yutaka Sugano (Arzest) Atsushi Nakao (CAProduction) Yuichi Mizobe (Chunsoft) Kazuhiko Ogawa (Chunsoft) Kentaro Sei (Good-Feel) Hirosato Funaki (Mitchell) Satoru Tsujita (Mitchell) Takehiko Hosokawa (Nintendo) Tomohiko Aita (Prope) Keita Eto (Skip) Jun Taniguchi (Vanpool)
- Producer: Various: Yoji Ishii (Arzest) Etsunobu Ebisu (Good-Feel) Toyokazu Nonaka (Nintendo) Yuji Naka (Prope) Hiroshi Suzuki (Skip) Jun Tsuda (Vanpool)
- Programmer: Various: Yuki Hatakeyama (Arzest) Shinji Iseki (Arzest) Minoru Ogawa (Arzest) Shinsuke Miyamoto (Chunsoft) Yuhei Matsuda (Good-Feel)
- Artists: Masamichi Harada (Arzest); Hiroki Nakata (Chunsoft); Masashi Tsuboyama (Good-Feel)
- Composer: Various: Katsumi Yokokawa (Chunsoft) Tomoya Tomita (Good-Feel) Akihiro Juichiya (Good-Feel) Toshiyuki Sudo (Nintendo) Daisuke Matsuoka (Nintendo) Hirofumi Taniguchi (Skip) Masayoshi Ishi (T's Music) Masanori Adachi (Vanpool) Tomoko Sano (Vanpool)
- Series: Wii
- Platform: Wii
- Release: NA: June 13, 2011; EU: June 24, 2011; AU: June 30, 2011; JP: July 7, 2011
- Genre: Party
- Modes: Single-player, multiplayer

Wii Play: Motion (Note: Known in Japan as Wii Remote Plus Variety (Japanese: Wiiリモコンプラス バラエティ, Hepburn: Wii Rimokon Pulasu Baraeti)) is a 2011 party video game published by Nintendo for the Wii. The sequel to the 2006 game Wii Play, it was released in North America on June 13, 2011; Europe on June 24; Australia on June 30; and Japan on July 7, 2011.

Unlike the original game, which was developed entirely by Nintendo, the twelve minigames were outsourced to numerous developers alongside Nintendo; these included Prope, Vanpool, and Skip Ltd., among others. Wii Play: Motion was released as a bundle with a Wii Remote Plus (red in Europe and black in other regions). The game is the final game in the Wii series to be released on the Wii.

The game received mixed reviews from critics upon release, though it was generally considered to be superior to its predecessor.

== Gameplay ==
Like its predecessor Wii Play, Wii Play: Motion is a minigame collection that features Miis as playable characters. All the minigames require use of the Wii MotionPlus accessory or Wii Remote Plus controller, which allows Wii Remote movement to be detected with greater accuracy. Twelve minigames are available to play with both single-player and multiplayer modes. Unlike its predecessor, Wii Play: Motion features several minigames that can be played with up to four players, as well as sub-modes for most games.

=== Games ===
There are 12 minigames in Wii Play: Motion. The game starts with eight of the 12 being locked and are only accessible after playing the previous minigame.

Additionally, there are four hidden games, accessible by waiting on the title screen for a few seconds. Two of these games require the player to hold certain directions on the +Control Pad.

Title	Description	Developer
Cone Zone	Players use the Wii Remote to balance an ice cream cone as scoops of ice cream are incrementally added. As the stack of ice cream grows higher, the stack grows top-heavy and becomes more difficult to balance. The player is ultimately scored on how many scoops were added to the stack before it finally topples over. In a sub-mode of the minigame, the player's cone is dispensed with soft serve ice cream. The player is tasked with angling the cone so that the soft serve gradually grows into a desired spiral shape, and is scored based on numerous factors, such as the ice cream height and the balance.	Arzest Corporation
Veggie Guardin'	Moles attempt to steal players' vegetables and must be prevented by hitting them on the head in a Whac-A-Mole-style game. There is also a mode which instead requires the player to hit a sequence of moles in the correct order.	Good-Feel
Skip Skimmer	A stone skipping game in which the goal is to achieve the most skips. An additional mode adds ramps, rings and a goal area for which to aim.	Good-Feel
Pose Mii Plus	A sequel to "Pose Mii" from Wii Play, which uses six degrees of rotation in order to fit Miis through specifically shaped holes in the style of "Human Tetris".	Skip Ltd.
Trigger Twist	A sequel to "Shooting Range" from Wii Play. Includes a shooting gallery with targets such as UFOs, ninjas, and dinosaurs.	Prope
Jump Park	A Mii bounces off the walls and floor while players manage their trajectory in order to collect gems and reach the exit.	Arzest Corporation
Teeter Targets	Targets must be hit using rotating flippers to bounce a ball without letting it fall, before time runs out.	Nintendo
Spooky Search	The player is a ghost hunter tasked with capturing virtual ghosts within their vicinity. Ghosts hide outside of the area displayed on-screen, and must be found in the player's physical surroundings using the Wii Remote's speaker as a guide, then reeled back into the television for capture.	Arzest Corporation
Wind Runner	A racing game in which a Mii on inline skates is propelled by holding an umbrella in the direction of wind gusts, collecting gems along the way. There are two sub-modes for this game - a time attack mode which removes the gems, and a mode where the goal is to jump a long distance.	Vanpool
Treasure Twirl	Players wind and unwind an umbilical cable for a surface-supplied treasure diver who must avoid undersea obstacles.	Mitchell Corporation
Flutter Fly	Players use the Wii Remote to directly control an on-screen leaf. The leaf is waved like a hand fan in order to guide a group of balloons through an obstacle course. The player must take care to avoid hazards that could pop the balloons; the game ends if all the balloons are popped. The player is scored on how quickly the course is finished and how many balloons are remaining. In multiplayer, two players race their balloons through the obstacle course.	Skip Ltd.
Star Shuttle	A space station is assembled piece by piece using a small rocket carrying individual components to be docked to it, using the rocket's six thrusters for precision movements.	Chunsoft
Kaleidoscope (secret)	A simple kaleidoscope simulator operated by rotating the controller. The pattern of jewels changes as the controller is moved.	
Bubble Blow (secret)	Swing a wand around to create bubbles of varying sizes, in a grassy field. Bigger bubbles can be made by moving the controller more slowly.	
Dolphin Park (secret)	Guide a dolphin through a series of rings in an underwater setting. The dolphin can jump above the water to reach extra rings and balloons attached to boats piloted by Mii characters. Can be played by holding Up on the +Control Pad on the Title Screen.	Chunsoft
Loony Cycle (secret)	A Mii rides a unicycle that the player must guide to the end of several stages by tilting the controller. Can be played by holding Down on the +Control Pad on the Title Screen.	Mitchell Corporation

Each developer's minigames are listed in the credits.

== Development ==
Wii Play: Motion was announced by Nintendo's official press on April 12, 2011. It was also shown at the E3 convention that same year. The game's development resulted from the combined efforts of several game developers, including Good-Feel and Chunsoft, who were asked by Nintendo to create prototypes of games that utilized the Wii MotionPlus accessory. According to an interview on Iwata Asks, Ryusuke Niitani said he wanted to make a game himself if he ever had a chance to, so he created Teeter Targets. According to Cubed3, a total of around 200 staff members (including debug staff) were involved in the creation of Wii Play: Motion.

== Reception ==
Reception

Aggregate scores
Aggregator	Score
GameRankings	61.89%
Metacritic	60/100

Review scores
Publication	Score
Computer and Video Games	7.2/10
Eurogamer	6/10
GamePro	2/5
GameSpot	5.5/10
IGN	4.0/10
Nintendo Power	7.5/10
Nintendo World Report	6/10
Official Nintendo Magazine	70/100
Game Crunch	7.3/10

Wii Play: Motion received mixed reviews from critics, receiving an aggregate score of 61.89% on GameRankings as of March 2014. In Joey Davidson's review for CraveOnline, Joey said that the controller of the game was "nice", The mini-games were "decent", and the bundle was decent. Nintendo Power rated the game 7.5 out of 10, stating that "although a few activities aren't exactly winners, the majority are fun and guaranteed to familiarize new users with the bundled Wii Remote Plus controller."

In contrast, GamePro's Andrew Hayward gave the game two stars. Hayward said that the game "does spotlight a better set of diversions than the original release, but little here will wow or surprise players who have been through the existing gauntlet of Wii mini-game packages." GameSpot reviewer Nathan Meunier awarded the game a 5.5/10, stating that "Greater variety and depth don't save this second round of motion minigames from the bargain bin." IGN's Jack DeVries gave the game a "bad" rating of 4/10, stating that "Even if you need a controller, I still can't recommend this."

By July 2012, Wii Play: Motion had sold 1.12 million copies.
