= Digimon Adventure (video game) =

2013 video game

- Japanese cover art
- Developer: Prope
- Publisher: Namco Bandai Games
- Director: Kohei Takase
- Producers: Yuji Naka; Kazumasa Habu
- Programmer: Tomonori Sakamoto
- Writers: Toshitsugu Oishi; Yusaku Yamanaka
- Composers: Ran Ikeda; Yasuko Yamada; Koji Yamada
- Series: Digimon
- Platform: PlayStation Portable
- Release: JP: January 17, 2013

Digimon Adventure (デジモンアドベンチャー, Dejimon Adobenchā) is a 2013 role-playing video game developed by Prope and published by Namco Bandai Games under the Bandai label for the PlayStation Portable. The story of the game is based on the 1999 Digimon anime series of the same name. It includes dialogue with voice acting from the main voice acting team of the anime. The opening theme song for the anime, Butter-Fly by Kōji Wada, and the insert song used for digivolutions, Brave Heart by Ayumi Miyazaki, are also featured. The game is part of the series' 15th anniversary celebration and was released in Japan on January 13, 2013.

== Gameplay ==
A battle in Digimon Adventure based on the TV series episode "The Birth of Greymon". Here, Greymon and two Digimon companions battle Shellmon.

Initially, only seven characters and their Digimon partners are available. During the third arc, the eighth character, Hikari, becomes available. During the course of one episode, one character assumes the role of team leader and two other characters' Digimon partners join in battle. Occasionally, the team leader will be able to talk to the other characters mid-episode. By choosing the right answer, the relationship level between those two characters is increased. This has multiple benefits, like an assist attack in-battle and unlocking extra episodes after the main story.

A battle is between a maximum of six Digimon, three on each side. By default, the player controls the Digimon of the team leader and can take manual control of the other partner Digimon through the strategy menu. It has a turn-based system wherein each Digimon can use a regular attack, use special attacks, use items, guard against an attack, or attempt to run from a wild battle.

After completing a main episode unlocking the evolution, the Digimon can digivolve in-battle into their Champion, Ultimate or Mega forms. This significantly increases stats. Evolution consumes special points (SP) and does not use up a turn. Post-battle, the Digimon revert to their Rookie forms. Occasionally (for example, during the first time a Digimon evolves mid-story), they evolve pre-battle. The evolution sequences from the anime were completely reanimated for this game, unlike the non-credit version of the opening movie of the anime which was only cropped to fit the 16:9 aspect ratio of a PSP screen. Furthermore, the remaining Digimon that lacked their own warp evolution sequence in the anime are exclusively created for this game. These sequences are only shown once during the initial evolution, but can be viewed anytime from the library.

== Story ==
The game retells the story of the 1999 anime series, in which seven children; Tai (Taichi), Matt (Yamato), Sora, Izzy (Koushiro), Mimi, Joe and T.K. (Takeru), are mysteriously transported to the Digital World, where they meet monster companions known as Digimon. Using the power of the Digivice to evolve their Digimon partners into more powerful forms, Tai, his friends and their Digimon companions must work together in order to save both the Digital World and their own. The game also features the story of the film, Our War Game!, as well as original scenarios exclusive to this game.

== Development ==
Digimon Adventure was first announced in an August 2012 issue of Japanese V Jump magazine as part of the franchise's 15th anniversary, and would be designed as a recreation of the original Digimon anime television series fully for the PlayStation Portable. Game developer Yuji Naka announced via Twitter that his own studio, Prope, would be developing the title as the company's first role-playing game. A trailer was released the following September, revealing that the original main voice actors from the animated version would reprise their roles for the title, which includes over 70 hours of total voice audio. In addition to the series itself, the developers also included a scenario based on the 2000 Digimon film Our War Game!, as well as bonus "sub-episode quests".

First-print copies of the game came with a product code for a PlayStation Portable download title called Digivice Ver. Portable, an emulated version of the Digimon virtual pet device, as well a voucher which could be redeemed for in-game cards for the Gree mobile platform social game Digimon Collectors.

== Reception ==
Reception

Review score
Publication	Score
Famitsu	29 / 40

Digimon Adventure sold 47,807 copies in its debut week, debuting as the third highest-selling game of that period in the Media Create software charts. The game sold a total of 70,172 copies in the region before falling from the top 30 software charts the following month, and received a 29 out of 40 total score from Japanese Weekly Famitsu magazine based on individual reviews of 8, 7, 7, and 7.
