= Rodea the Sky Soldier =

- Developers: Wii; Prope; Wii U, Nintendo 3DS; Kadokawa Games
- Publishers: JP: Kadokawa Games; WW: NIS America
- Directors: Hitoshi Hasegawa; Tomohiko Aita (Note: Wii version's staff); Yusaku Yamanaka
- Producers: Yoshimi Yasuda; Yuji Naka
- Artist: Aki Igarashi
- Composer: Takayuki Nakamura
- Platforms: Wii, Wii U, Nintendo 3DS
- Release: JP: April 2, 2015; NA: November 10, 2015; EU: November 13, 2015; AU: November 19, 2015
- Genre: Action-adventure
- Mode: Single-player

Rodea the Sky Soldier is an action-adventure game developed by Prope for the Wii and Kadokawa Games for the Wii U and Nintendo 3DS. The game stars Rodea, an android who possesses the ability to fly and a "heart". These traits result in Rodea becoming a soldier in order to fulfill his promise of protecting the kingdom of Garuda, a series of islands that float in the sky, from the ground-based Naga Empire and its leader, Emperor Geardo. Although development was completed in 2011, Rodea the Sky Soldier went unreleased for four years until it finally saw a release in Japan in April 2015, and then a subsequent worldwide release in November 2015. The Wii version was the last game released for that platform in Japan.

== Gameplay ==
Rodea the Sky Soldier's gameplay differs noticeably between versions of the game.

Prope's prime Wii version's controls involve aiming with the Wii Remote at solid objects and pressing the B button to have Rodea fly in parabolic arcs. The Wii version uses temporary power-ups, such as a machine gun, to enable Rodea to overcome particular obstacles. Power-ups are maintained until Rodea takes damage or the player completes the current level, and they also crucially function as protection; should Rodea take damage once more without any power-ups, he will lose a life and respawn at the last checkpoint passed. The overall gameplay style resembles Naka's tenure on 3D Sonic games, with a more 3D reinterpretation of NiGHTs into Dreams.

Kadokawa's ported Wii U and Nintendo 3DS versions' controls involve using the joystick and control pad, respectively, to point a reticle on-screen and pressing the A button to launch Rodea toward that point. Unlike the Wii version, purchasable permanent upgrades are used to gradually improve Rodea. Another feature unique to the Wii U and 3DS versions is the usage of a fuel system, which limits the length of Rodea's flight time and forces the player to land when the fuel bar runs out. Certain actions, such as attacking, also drain the fuel bar at a faster rate.

== Plot ==
A thousand years before the game's story takes place, Rodea fights for the kingdom of Garuda against an invasion carried out by the mechanical army of the Naga Empire and its leader, Emperor Geardo. Upon seeing an airship piloted by Garuda's ruler, Princess Cecilia, shot down, Rodea flies off towards it to make sure Cecilia and the Key of Time she retrieved are both safe. Upon discovering Cecilia alive but shaken and that the Key is within her possession, Rodea realizes that they surrounded by a number of the Naga Empire's mechanical soldiers. Despite Rodea readying himself to fight, Cecilia tells him to stand down and splits the Key of Time in half. Cecilia gives one half to Rodea while telling him to protect it while she keeps the other, as the now-shattered Key will result in Geardo being unable conquer Garuda. Although Rodea pleads with Cecilia to give him the order to allow him to protect her, she sadly decides to teleport him away in order to enact her plan to protect the Key of Time, Garuda and Rodea himself. Rodea immediately finds himself teleported to a vast desert and, in a fit of despair and anger, smashes his right fist into the sand, shattering his right arm in the process and rendering his programming unstable. As he begins to shut down, Rodea ponders what it means to possess the heart that Cecilia gave him.

A thousand years later, a teenage inventor named Ion discovers Rodea and repairs his right arm with makeshift parts before managing to reactivate him. Upon coming back online, Rodea behaves in an emotionless manner while failing to recall what transpired in the last 1000 years. However, he soon restores his initial personality once he has a flashback to Cecilia after Ion, who greatly resembles her, touches his chest upon telling him what it is like to have heart. With his initial personality back, though still suffering from amnesia, Rodea allies with Ion and her village in order to both stop the Naga Empire's renewed invasion of Garuda and restore his memories.

== Development ==
Rodea the Sky Soldier started with an allusion by Yuji Naka in 2010, where he described "a very original action game based in the sky." After some development CVG praised the game's early build, drawing comparisons to the game with other games developed by Naka, such as Nights into Dreams... and the Sonic the Hedgehog series. Naka revealed in 2011 that the Wii version of the game was finished, and needed Kadokawa Games to publish it for a potential release. That same year, XSEED Games expressed interest in localizing Rodea the Sky Soldier for the North American region. However, a few years passed without a release by Kadokawa Games, and Naka stated in a 2012 Polygon interview that he was unsure what was going to happen with the game. Kadokawa Games president Yoshimi Yasuda revealed in July 2013 that the Nintendo 3DS version of the game was roughly 70% finished, while reiterating that the Wii and 3DS versions were not cancelled.

In May 2014, Kadokawa Games filed a trademark for the game, albeit under the tweaked title of Rodea: The Sky Soldier. On November 14, 2014, Kadokawa Games announced that the home version of the game had switched platforms from the Wii to the Wii U and that the game was scheduled to be released in Spring 2015. It was also revealed that the Wii version of the game developed by Prope would finally be released as a free bonus that would come bundled with the Wii U version during the Wii U version's initial print.

Rodea the Sky Soldier was released in Japan on April 2, 2015. On June 10, NIS America announced that the game's original international release of September 22 had been delayed to October 13. However, they later announced that the game's release was delayed yet again and rescheduled from October 13 to November, citing "ongoing technical difficulties" as the reason for the delay. On November 10, Rodea the Sky Soldier released in North America, and in Europe on November 13.

== Reception ==
Reception

Aggregate score
Aggregator	Score
Metacritic	45/100 (Wii U); 45/100 (3DS); N/A (Wii)

Review scores
Publication	Score
Destructoid	7/10
Electronic Gaming Monthly	4/10
Famitsu	30/40
Nintendo Life	6/10
IGN Spain	4/10

Rodea the Sky Soldier received generally negative reviews on the Wii U and Nintendo 3DS, having scores of 46/100 and 45/100, respectively, on Metacritic. Overall, critics praised the game's characters and gameplay, while panning the visuals and controls of the Wii U and 3DS versions.

Reviews for the Wii version have been sparse due to its limited availability, but they have been more positive than the Wii U and 3DS versions. Cubed3's Albert Lichi rated the game a 7/10 and thus awarded the Wii version the website's Bronze Award. While stating that the Wii version "does not quite reach Super Mario Galaxy levels of visual fidelity", he praised it for not having "ugly visuals, unyielding frame-rate and a nightmarish control scheme that do not do Yuji Naka's project justice", in reference to the Wii U and 3DS versions. He also complimented its usage of a temporary power-up system in comparison to the permanent upgrade system used in the Wii U and 3DS versions, due to the former system resulting in players having Rodea function at his fullest immediately and thus avoiding any grinding that the latter system would involve in order to upgrade Rodea.

NF Magazine rated the Wii version an 8/10 and stated strong support for it over the Wii U and 3DS versions by saying that people interested in the game should "Buy Rodea the Sky Soldier for Wii U, toss the Wii U disc into a nearby sewage canal, pop the Wii disc into your machine and let 'er spin!". Vandal Online's Jorge Cano rated the Wii version a 7.5/10 and said that "even though it feels a little bit outdated, it still is interesting and fun for those who know the game they're buying" while also reiterating support for the Wii version by saying it "clearly is the 'good one'."

Reviews for the Wii U and Nintendo 3DS versions have been mixed to negative. Famitsu gave the Wii U and 3DS versions each a score of 30/40. Destructoid's Chris Carter rated the Wii U version a 7/10, stating the game "really hits that sweet spot when it comes to evoking the wonder of flight, but the troubled developmental process is tangible in the final build. For those of you who can stomach older experiences however, you'll likely overlook some of its issues and find a lot to love." Nintendo Life's Ben Bertoli rated the Wii U version 6/10 and echoed a similar statement, summarizing "The Sky Soldier is an interesting game. When it comes to unique gameplay and classic Yuji Naka charm the title truly soars. Unfortunately it also suffers from frustrating camera problems, a steep learning curve and some frequently aggravating combat. Players planning to taking to the skies with Rodea will likely enjoy most of their journey, but they are in for a bumpy ride." IGN Spain rated the Wii U version a 4/10, panning the game's controls and graphics while summarizing that "Rodea arrives 15 years late with poor controls and even poorer graphics."
