= Boost Beast =

2017 puzzle video game

- Developer: Arzest
- Publisher: Arc System Works
- Platform: Nintendo Switch
- Release: July 20, 2017
- Genre: Match-three
- Modes: Single-player, multiplayer

Boost Beast is a puzzle video game developed by Arzest, published by Arc System Works and released simultaneously in all regions on July 20, 2017 for the Nintendo Switch. As of April 2025, the game has an conclusive score of 48 on Metacritic.

== Reception ==
Boost Beast currently has a score of 48 out of 100 on Metacritic, indicating "Generally unfavorable reviews". In his review for Nintendo Life, gave the game 7 out of 10 stars, stating that while he enjoyed the fact that only a certain color of zombie can be repelled by a tile of a matching and stating that the game's 'overkill' cycles (where a player can keep racking up points by saving "color bombs" until the end of the round, which rid the board of any remaining combos, clears and bombs) where satisfying to watch, he came to the conclusion that the game was better for "short bursts" of playtime, rather that extended sessions. He also stated that while he found the game's color system to be an "excellent idea", he found that it relied too much on the luck of the draw, saying that not having the required color could mean "failing the stage right there" and that "having to restart a level five, eight, or ten times because of dumb luck instead of lack of skill gets old quickly."

Writing for Nintendo World Report, Justin Nation gave Boost Beast a more negative score of 3.5 out of 10, stating that while there's nothing "glaringly bad" about the gameplay, there wasn't anything "brilliant" about it as well, stating that anyone who's played the typical "match-three" puzzle game wouldn't find any surprises with Boost Beast, stating that the game "fails to differentiate itself from even the most generic match-three puzzlers." Ultimately stating that people interested in this game would be better off playing it on their smartphone.
