= Digimon All-Star Rumble =

2014 video game

- North American cover art featuring the cast
- Developer: Prope
- Publisher: Bandai Namco Games
- Director: Tomohiko Aita
- Producers: Yuji Naka; Kazumasa Habu
- Designers: Shunsuke Kawarazuka; Michihiko Okano; Yusaku Yamanaka
- Artist: Hidenori Oda
- Composers: Ryusuke Fujioka; Keita Tsuda
- Series: Digimon
- Platforms: PlayStation 3, Xbox 360
- Release: NA: November 11, 2014; PAL: November 14, 2014
- Genre: Fighting
- Modes: Single-player, multiplayer

Digimon All-Star Rumble is a fighting video game developed by Prope and published by Bandai Namco Games for the PlayStation 3 and Xbox 360 video game consoles. The game is part of the Digimon franchise and features characters from across its several iterations. It was released in November 2014 in North America, Europe and Australia.

== Setting ==
The game is set in the Digital World at a time of peace. The Digimon propose to hold a "Digimon Evolution Tournament" in order to gain experience and Digivolve, as well as determine the strongest one. However, there is an ulterior motive behind the tournament and players will discover what this is as they play through the game's Story Mode.

== Gameplay and characters ==
Digimon All-Star Rumble features 12 base playable Digimon (6 of them from Digimon Adventure, 2 from Digimon Adventure 02, 2 from Digimon Tamers and 2 from Digimon Fusion), and a total of 32 forms. Six of the base forms and their Digivolutions were revealed in the game's announcement.

Each Digimon can Digivolve into a higher form during battle when their meter is filled. When Story Mode is completed with a character, their "Super Form" will be unlocked; to play as this form, when selecting the character, the player is given the option to switch the character's alternate form from their regular Digivolved form to the unlocked Super Form. A certain powerup in the game turns the other Digimon in the battle into Numemon temporarily.

On the following chart, players can see every playable Digimon, Digivolved Forms and Super Forms available in the game. Some of these evolutions are not common in the Digimon universe, but some adjustments have been made to balance the game and include as many forms as possible.

== Stage Digimon (enemies) ==
- ShellNumemon
- Apemon
- Goblimon
- Mushroomon
- Tortomon
- SkullMammothmon
- Cyclonemon
- Boltmon
- Ebemon
- Locomon (cannot be attacked, instead Locomon will run over and damage any Digimon standing on the train tracks when it drives by)

Base	Digivolved Form	Super Form	Season (Anime)	English voice actor
Agumon	WarGreymon	Omnimon	Digimon Adventure	Lex Lang (WarGreymon); Lex Lang & Kirk Thornton (Omnimon) (Agumon voice uncredited)
Gabumon	MetalGarurumon	Omnimon	Digimon Adventure	Kirk Thornton (Gabumon, MetalGarurumon); Kirk Thornton & Lex Lang (Omnimon)
Biyomon	Hououmon	Examon	Digimon Adventure	Mela Lee (Biyomon, Hououmon); Lex Lang (Examon)
Tentomon	MegaKabuterimon	TyrantKabuterimon	Digimon Adventure	R. Martin Klein
Gomamon	Plesiomon	Aegisdramon	Digimon Adventure	R. Martin Klein
Gatomon	Angewomon	Examon	Digimon Adventure; Digimon Adventure 02	Mary Elizabeth McGlynn (Gatomon, Angewomon); Lex Lang (Examon)
Veemon	ExVeemon	Imperialdramon Fighter Mode	Digimon Adventure 02	Derek Stephen Prince (Veemon, ExVeemon); Derek Stephen Prince & Paul St. Peter (Imperialdramon)
Wormmon	Stingmon	Imperialdramon Fighter Mode	Digimon Adventure 02	Paul St. Peter (Wormmon, Stingmon); Paul St. Peter & Derek Stephen Prince (Imperialdramon)
Guilmon	WarGrowlmon	Gallantmon	Digimon Tamers	Steven Blum (Guilmon, WarGrowlmon); Steven Blum & Ben Diskin (Gallantmon)
Impmon	Beelzemon	Shoutmon X5B	Digimon Tamers	Derek Stephen Prince (Impmon, Beelzemon); Ben Diskin (Shoutmon X5B)
Shoutmon	OmniShoutmon	Shoutmon DX	Digimon Fusion	Ben Diskin (Shoutmon, OmniShoutmon, Shoutmon DX)
Dorulumon	Shoutmon X4	Shoutmon X5B	Digimon Fusion	Lex Lang (Dorulumon); Ben Diskin (Shoutmon X4, Shoutmon X5B)

== Reception ==
Reception

Aggregate score
Aggregator	Score
Metacritic	PS3: 49/100

Review score
Publication	Score
Push Square	5/10

All-Star Rumble had a total score of 49 and received "generally unfavorable reviews" according to Metacritic.

Push Square gave the game 5 out of 10; summarising that "at its core, Digimon All-Star Rumble is an accessible brawler that may be a hit with younger gamers, but numerous issues put a dampener on the fun. Story mode will frustrate, and while the fleshed out versus mode is easily the title's best asset, the total lack of online multiplayer will be the nail in the coffin for fighting enthusiasts. With tempered expectations, fans could get something out of this, but for everyone else, there are better brawlers for better prices already on the market".

PlayStation Lifestyle gave the game 4.5 out of 10, praising the games "exclusive western release and the amount of character content but felt the game was unfinished and repetitive."

Mike Fahey of Kotaku stated that despite his desire for a Digimon game, it was "not enough that I can give this half-assed effort a pass."
