= Arzest =

Japanese video game development company

Arzest Corporation
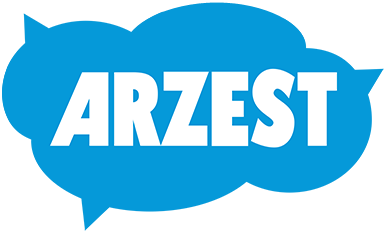
- Native name: 株式会社アーゼスト
- Type: Private
- Industry: Video games
- Predecessor: Artoon
- Founded: June 25, 2010; 16 years ago
- Headquarters: Yokohama, Japan
- Key people: Yoji Ishii (chairman & CEO); Naoto Ohshima (president & COO); Yutaka Sugano (vice president)
- Number of employees: 80
- Website: www.arzest.jp/english/index.html

Arzest Corporation (Japanese: 株式会社アーゼスト, Hepburn: Kabushiki gaisha Āzesuto) is a Japanese video game developer formed on June 25, 2010, by Naoto Ohshima (a former character designer for the Sonic the Hedgehog franchise), Yoji Ishii, and key members of their previous studio, Artoon, and based in Yokohama. Its name is a portmanteau of the words "art" and "zest".

== History ==
Arzest was founded on June 25, 2010, after Yoji Ishii left AQ Interactive, where he served as president and CEO upon the company's acquisition of Artoon in May 2004. Around the same time, Artoon was absorbed into AQ Interactive. Arzest is based in the former Artoon offices in Yokohama. The studio employs approximately 80 people, a dozen of them former Sega and Artoon staff.

Arzest started off working on select mini-games in Wii Play: Motion for Nintendo, with whom the studio would work with on numerous occasions, developing such titles as Yoshi's New Island, as well as content updates to the Nintendo 3DS application StreetPass Mii Plaza (namely the addition of SpotPass features to the mini-game Puzzle Swap, among others).

Arzest collaborated with Sonic Team to develop its latest title, Sonic Superstars (2023). Beginning work in early 2021, it marked Naoto Ohshima's first involvement with the Sonic series since Sonic Adventure (1998)

=== Balan Wonderworld controversy ===
In January 2018, Ohshima's Sega colleague Yuji Naka joined Square Enix. After that, Arzest collaborated with Square Enix to begin development of what would become Balan Wonderworld, reuniting Ohshima and Naka in their first collaboration since Sonic Adventure.

However, the pair's partnership soured as tensions arose during development. In April 2022, a year after leaving Square Enix the previous April, Naka said that he had been removed from the development team six months before release after he complained of Balan's state and accused Arzest of not addressing the bugs at the time of its submission.

Balan Wonderworld was released in March 2021 to critical and commercial failure. Naka believed that it had been released unfinished, and accused both Arzest and Square Enix of "not caring for their customers".

== Games ==
Game	Year	Platform(s)	Notes
Wii Play: Motion	2011	Wii	Developed games: Spooky Search, Jump Park, and Cone Zone
StreetPass Mii Plaza	2011	Nintendo 3DS	Built-in app for console; also developed StreetPass Explorers / Mii Trek
Time Travelers	2012	3DS, PSP, PS Vita	Character modeling
Slot Monsters	2013	Android, iOS	
Yoshi's New Island	2014	3DS	Published by Nintendo
Terra Battle	2015	Android, iOS	Co-developed with Mistwalker
Boost Beast	2015	Android, iOS, Browser, Kindle, Nintendo Switch	
Mario & Sonic at the Rio 2016 Olympic Games	2016	3DS	Not involved in the Wii U version
Hey! Pikmin	2017	3DS	Published by Nintendo
Terra Wars	2018	Android, iOS	Co-developed with Mistwalker
Mario & Luigi: Bowser's Inside Story + Bowser Jr.'s Journey	2019	3DS	Developed Giant Battles section, Published by Nintendo
Hypnosis Mic: Alternative Rap Battle	2020	Android, iOS	Programmed rhythm game, Published by Idea Factory
Balan Wonderworld	2021	Microsoft Windows, PlayStation 4, PlayStation 5, Xbox One, Xbox Series X/S, Nintendo Switch	Co-developed with Square Enix (under the Balan Company brand) and published by Square Enix
Fantasian	2021	iOS	Co-developed with Mistwalker
Sonic Superstars	2023	Microsoft Windows, PlayStation 4, PlayStation 5, Xbox One, Xbox Series X/S, Nintendo Switch	Co-developed with Sonic Team
