= Let's Tap =

2008 video game

- Developer: Prope
- Publisher: Sega
- Directors: Shunsuke Kawarazuka; Tetsuo Shinyu
- Producers: Yuji Naka; Hiroyuki Miyazaki
- Artist: Hiroyuki Yamamoto
- Composers: Ayako Saso; Naofumi Hataya; Shinji Hosoe; Azusa Chiba; Masaharu Iwata; Mitsuhiro Kaneda; Noriyuki Kamikura
- Platforms: Wii, iOS
- Release: JP: December 18, 2008; NA: June 16, 2009; PAL: June 19, 2009
- Genres: Rhythm, Minigames
- Modes: Single player, multiplayer

Let's Tap is a video game developed by Yuji Naka's studio Prope and published by Sega for the Wii console. Along with Let's Catch, Let's Tap was the first game from Prope to be announced. Owners of Let's Tap can unlock content in Let's Catch. The game was later released as five individual applications for iOS.

== Gameplay ==
Let's Tap consists of a number of minigames that requires the player to tap a flat surface with their hands to play. The game requires the player to set the Wii Remote face-side down on a flat, stable surface, with the accelerometer picking up their vibrations as they tap the surface to move an on-screen character in a race, inflate a balloon, create ripples in a pool of water or paint swirls on a canvas.

In a video released by Sega the player is shown resting the Wii Remote on an empty box originally used to package the Wii console. In Japan and Europe Sega released the game with two foldout cardboard boxes that players are able to use as a tapping surface, but these are not included in the North American package.

=== Minigames ===
The game features the following minigames:

- Tap Runner: Up to four players compete in a side scrolling race along an obstacle course where they must jump over chasms, climb up ramps and edge along tightropes, in addition to completing mini challenges such as inflating a balloon the fastest. The game is controlled with the speed of taps, with rhythmic tapping making the player jog, faster taps to run and a hard tap to jump.
- Rhythm Tap: Players tap in time to a moving timeline of musical beats.
- Silent Blocks: Players must pull away blocks that make up an unstable tower by carefully tapping. A puzzle mode variation sees players making stacks of three or more matching colored blocks in order to make them disappear.
- Bubble Voyager: Players control a character through a maze of floating mines, collecting stars along the way. The minigame also features a multiplayer battle mode for up to four players.
- Visualizer: A freeform mode where players use taps to create imagery such as fireworks bursting over a futuristic cityscape, paint splattering on a canvas, and ripples of water across a pond.

== Reception ==
Reception

Aggregate scores
Aggregator	Score
GameRankings	72.63%
Metacritic	70/100

Review scores
Publication	Score
1Up.com	C+
Edge	8/10
Eurogamer	8/10
Game Informer	5.5/10
GamePro	4/5
GamesMaster	80%
GamesRadar+	7/10
IGN	8.5/10
Nintendo Power	70%
Official Nintendo Magazine	78%

Let's Tap has received mixed or average reviews from critics, garnering a Metascore of 70 at Metacritic.

Eurogamer praised the innovative control method and the well-designed minigames, calling it "one of the few worthwhile and interesting mini-game compilations in existence". N-Europe called it "very original and conceptually ambitious", praising its accessible control scheme and multiplayer modes.
