= Let's Catch =

2008 video game

- Developer: Prope
- Publisher: Sega
- Directors: Tomohiko Aita; Tetsuo Shinyu
- Producers: Yuji Naka; Hiroyuki Miyazaki
- Designers: Shunsuke Kawarazuka; Toshitsugu Oishi
- Composer: Hiroyuki Yamamoto
- Platform: Wii
- Release: JP: December 16, 2008; NA: June 15, 2009; PAL: June 19, 2009

Let's Catch is a video game developed by Prope and published by Sega for the Wii console. It was released as a downloadable WiiWare game in Japan in December 2008 and worldwide in June 2009.

Essentially a virtual game of catch, Let's Catch uses the Wii Remote for play. Owners of Prope's Wii game Let's Tap are able to unlock content in Let’s Catch.

== Gameplay ==
The game features several game modes:

- Story: Single player with nine "dramatic sequences" set in a park.
- Speed Catch: Single player. Players catch balls thrown at them with increasing velocity, reaching speeds of over 240 km/h.
- Nine Trial: Up to four players. Each player is given a board with nine panels. The race is to see who can throw balls through all the panels the fastest.
- Bomber Catch: Up to four players. Players throw a bomb around, and the player holding the bomb when it explodes loses one heart.
- High Score: One to two players. Players continue throwing balls in order to get the highest score. A bonus is given for throwing and catching without dropping the ball.
- Free Play: One to two players. A practice mode where players simply throw the ball around.

== Reception ==
Reception

Aggregate score
Aggregator	Score
Metacritic	63/100

Review scores
Publication	Score
IGN	6.5/10
Nintendo Life	3/10
Wiiloveit.com	19/30

The game received a score of 63/100 at Metacritic indicating "mixed or average reviews". Although Nintendo Life praised the presentation and controls, they otherwise felt that as a whole the game was shallow and repetitive. IGN called the story mode of the game "heartwarming and unique", but also noted the repetitive nature of the game. Wiiloveit.com thought much of the game, but the hefty price tag really got in the way of being able to recommend it strongly.
