= Ivy the Kiwi? =

2009 video game

- Developer: Prope
- Publishers: JP: Namco Bandai Games; NA: Xseed Games, Prope (iOS, Android); EU: Rising Star Games
- Producer: Yuji Naka
- Designer: Yuji Naka
- Platforms: Windows Mobile, Nintendo DS, Wii, iOS, Android
- Release: Windows Mobile: JP: November 2009; NA: January 20, 2010; Wii, Nintendo DS: JP: April 22, 2010; NA: August 24, 2010; EU: October 29, 2010; iOS: NA: October 11, 2012; Android: NA: August 21, 2013
- Genre: Platformer
- Modes: Single-player, multiplayer

Ivy the Kiwi? (アイビィ ザ キウィ?, Aibyi za Kiwi?) is a platform video game developed by Prope and designed by Yuji Naka. The Windows Mobile version was released in Japan in November 2009 and in North America in January 2010. That same year, versions for Wii and Nintendo DS were published by Namco Bandai Games in Japan, by Xseed Games in North America, and by Rising Star Games in Europe. The game was ported and released for iOS in October 2012 and Android in August 2013.

== Gameplay ==
=== Concept ===
The objective in the game is to lead the character, Ivy, a newly born bird, to her lost mother. The game is similar to Kirby: Canvas Curse because the player does not directly control the main character. In the game, Ivy is constantly moving directly right or left, unless presented with something in her way, in which case she turns around and moves the other direction. The player takes advantage of this by drawing lines to guide the chick away from danger and to the goal. The player can make ramp lines to have Ivy walk up or down, make vertical lines to reverse her direction, or pull the vines and slingshot Ivy in a given direction. Ultimately, the player must lead Ivy away from obstacles such as spikes or rats and to the end goal.

The game features several different modes. The main game is where levels are simply played in order. Another mode lets the player play any level that has been previously played in the main game to try to beat the high scores. There are also two different ways to play multiplayer. One is the competitive multiplayer mode, where up to four players can compete to see who can get their Kiwi to the goal the fastest, the tricky part being that any player can interact with any other player's Kiwi as well. Separately from this mode, at any point, up to four players can choose to play cooperatively to help the first player in the main game.

According to lead designer Yuji Naka, there are various reasons that the game's unusual title has a question mark. Reasons include piquing curiosity in potential players to pick up the game, as well as playing a role in the game's story regarding Ivy's identity.

=== Version differences ===
The Wii and Nintendo DS versions offer the same basic gameplay and level designs, with the main difference being the controls. In the Wii version, the player points at the screen to draw vines, while in the Nintendo DS version the player uses the stylus.

The original Japanese version of the game had a more muted color scheme, while more colorful backgrounds were added in the international releases at the request of publishers.

The full retail versions of Ivy the Kiwi? for the Wii and Nintendo DS have 100 levels, while the mini version available for DSiWare only has 50 levels. While the game originally began development as a WiiWare game, that version was cancelled as Yuji Naka began adding more features and ideas.

== Reception ==
Reception

Aggregate score
Aggregator	Score		
Aggregator	DS	iOS	Wii
Metacritic	69/100	60/100	74/100

Review scores
Publication	Score		
Publication	DS	iOS	Wii
1Up.com	B	N/A	B
Eurogamer	7/10	N/A	N/A
Game Informer	6/10	N/A	N/A
GamePro	4/5	N/A	N/A
GameRevolution	N/A	N/A	B
GameSpot	N/A	N/A	7.5/10
GameZone	8/10	N/A	N/A
IGN	7.5/10	N/A	7.5/10
Joystiq	N/A	N/A	4/5
Nintendo Power	7/10	N/A	7.5/10
The A.V. Club	N/A	N/A	B
The Guardian	3/5	N/A	N/A

The game received "mixed or average" reviews on all platforms according to video game review aggregator platform Metacritic. Official Nintendo Magazine gave the DS version a score of 70% and called it a "fun platformer with a twist, held back by a lack of ambition and some frustrating later levels".

411Mania gave the Wii version a score of 7.7 out of ten and said it was "a good diversion for people needing a short break from bigger games. The levels are short and look great while playing, yet offers a bit more by collecting feathers. However, even with the feather collecting it won't take you long to find everything. For Wii owners wanting something short to tide them over, you may want to check this game out. Just don't expect anything in depth and time consuming here." However, the same website also gave the DS version a score of 4.6 out of 10 and stated that what this version was missing was letting the player break out and play as Ivy, and though the author criticized the stylus controls, he did feel that this version looks "perfectly acceptable and suitable for young children as a gateway game for the Nintendo DS." The A.V. Club gave the Wii version a B and said, "While the story mode's brevity betrays Ivy's roots as a Windows Phone game, the 50 extra challenge stages and competitive multiplayer modes flesh out the package nicely." The Guardian, however, gave the DS version three stars out of five and called it "a solid, above-average casual game that's likely to have platformer fans hooked, for a few hours at least."
