= Sonic Superstars =

2023 video game

- Developers: Arzest; Sonic Team
- Publisher: Sega
- Director: Shunsuke Kawaraduka
- Producers: Takashi Iizuka; Naoto Ohshima; Yasuyuki Tsuzuki
- Designers: Saki Ishiguro; Daiki Nakajima; Gen Shiomi
- Programmer: Shinji Iseki
- Artist: Daisuke Kojima
- Writer: Takashi Iizuka
- Composer: Jun Senoue
- Series: Sonic the Hedgehog
- Engine: Unity
- Platforms: Nintendo Switch; PlayStation 4; PlayStation 5; Windows; Xbox One; Xbox Series X/S
- Release: October 17, 2023
- Genre: Platform
- Modes: Single-player, multiplayer

Sonic Superstars (Note: Japanese: ソニック スーパースターズ, Hepburn: Sonikku Sūpāsutāzu) is a 2023 platform game developed by Arzest and Sonic Team and published by Sega. It features side-scrolling gameplay similar to the Sonic the Hedgehog games released for the Sega Genesis in the 1990s. As one of four player characters—Sonic the Hedgehog, Miles "Tails" Prower, Knuckles the Echidna, and Amy Rose—the player completes side-scrolling levels as they set out to defeat Doctor Eggman and Fang the Hunter. Superstars introduces power-ups that the player can obtain by collecting the seven Chaos Emeralds and four-player local multiplayer.

Sonic Team's head, Takashi Iizuka, wanted to modernize Sonic's traditional side-scrolling formula so it could continue independently from the 3D games. After plans for another collaboration with the developers of Sonic Mania (2017) fell through, Iizuka began discussing a collaboration with Arzest, a studio founded by Sonic co-creator Naoto Ohshima. Development on Superstars, which marked Ohshima's first contribution to a Sonic game since Sonic Adventure (1998), began in 2021. Arzest sought to replicate the Genesis Sonic gameplay while innovating with new game mechanics, with the Chaos Emerald powers introduced to encourage players to seek all seven.

Sonic Superstars was released for Nintendo Switch, PlayStation 4, PlayStation 5, Windows, Xbox One, and Xbox Series X/S on October 17, 2023. It received mixed reviews from critics, who felt it was superior to the previous 2D games Sonic the Hedgehog 4: Episode I (2010) and Episode II (2012) but inferior to Mania. They praised its replication of the Genesis-era Sonic gameplay but criticized its new mechanics, while the visuals and music were divisive. Initial sales were slightly below expectations, attributed to competition from the similar platform game Super Mario Bros. Wonder (2023), though Sega later reported it had sold well; sales reached 2.43 million by June 2025.

== Gameplay ==
Sonic and Knuckles explore Bridge Island Zone, one of the game's levels.

Sonic Superstars is a side-scrolling platform game similar to the Sonic the Hedgehog games released for the Sega Genesis in the 1990s. The player must complete a series of levels across several zones, presented from a 2.5D perspective, to defeat Doctor Eggman, who has hired Fang the Hunter and Trip the Sungazer to capture the North Star Islands' giant animals so he can build a powerful army. There are four initial player characters, each with their own unique abilities: Sonic the Hedgehog can roll into a dash after a jump; Miles "Tails" Prower can fly; Knuckles the Echidna can glide and climb; and Amy Rose can attack enemies with a hammer and double jump. Players unlock an additional character, Trip, by completing the main campaign once; her moveset combines Amy's double jump with Knuckles' climbing.

The North Star Islands comprise 12 zones, which house 26 levels ("acts"). The number of acts in a zone varies between one, two, and three. Each contains elements such as springs, vertical loops, collectible rings that serve as health, and shield power-ups. (Note: Attributed to multiple sources:) Some zones feature unique elements, such as a jungle with vines the player can grind on and a futuristic zone where they transform into a voxel creature, and some feature acts exclusive to the selected character. Each act ends with a boss that the player must defeat while dodging attacks. In between levels, the player explores a 2D hub world where they can select a zone and change or customize their character. The campaign takes four hours to complete as a single character, and about 15 hours as every character. Unlike previous 2D Sonic games, Superstars does not feature lives, so the player will never receive a game over. Completing the main game unlocks a more difficult campaign in which Trip is the only playable character.

Superstars features two kinds of special stages. In the first, accessed through giant rings hidden in each act, the player swings from bubbles in a 3D environment to obtain one of the seven Chaos Emeralds. Each emerald grants the player a power-up ability, such as the ability to swim up waterfalls or create clones of the chosen character; the seventh provides a character-specific ability. Collecting all seven emeralds allows the player to transform into their character's super form, granting them speed and invincibility at the cost of ring depletion. The player can swap abilities from a selection wheel at any time. Players must complete both the main campaign and Trip's with all the Chaos Emeralds to unlock the Last Story. In the second special stage, accessed by passing checkpoints, the player navigates a rotating maze, similar to those from Sonic the Hedgehog (1991), to collect medals.

The campaign supports local multiplayer for up to four players who can join or leave at any time, a first for the series. Superstars also features a player versus player component that can be played locally or online and supports cross-platform play. Players create robots to partake in competitions, which include races, battles, collection competitions, and last man standing. The medals collected in the main game serve as currency to purchase parts for customization.

== Development ==
=== Conception ===
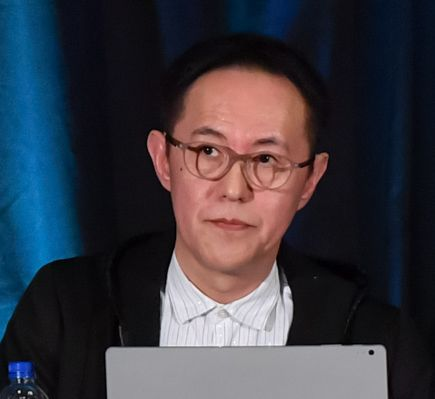
Superstars marked Sonic co-creator Naoto Ohshima's first contribution to the series since Sonic Adventure (1998).

The idea for Sonic Superstars originated with Sonic Mania (2017), a 2D game developed by Christian Whitehead, PagodaWest Games, and Headcannon. The Sonic series' producer, Sonic Team's Takashi Iizuka, was surprised by Mania's success and saw it as confirmation that fans were still interested in the series' "classic" style. Sonic Team and the Mania developers, who formed Evening Star Studio in 2018, began discussing another collaboration following Mania's release. They did not want to make a Mania sequel since Iizuka felt casual audiences would dismiss it as a rehash; he wanted to abandon Mania's pixel art style as Mania had been intended for hardcore Sonic fans, and he thought a new 2D game needed to appeal to a broad audience.

Whitehead said that Sonic Team and Evening Star "agreed early on that we should try to make something fresh", such as using a new art style like traditional animation or 2.5D graphics and not reusing content from prior Sonic games. Evening Star created a 2.5D prototype that experimented with depth using its in-development Star Engine. However, Sonic Team and Evening Star eventually decided against developing the prototype into a full product, and Evening Star moved on to develop Penny's Big Breakaway (2024). Whitehead denied rumors that the decision was caused by creative differences and said that Evening Star's relationship with Sega remained friendly.

During a COVID-19 pandemic lockdown, Iizuka and Sonic co-creator Naoto Ohshima held a drinking party over Zoom for fun. They expressed mutual interest in a new 2D Sonic game and began discussing a collaboration. Although Ohshima left Sega in 1999 and had not contributed to a Sonic game since Sonic Adventure (1998), he remained a fan and had enjoyed games such as Sonic Colors (2010), Sonic Generations (2011), Sonic Mania (2017), and Sonic Frontiers (2022). Additionally, he noticed many of his followers on social media were Sonic fans and wanted to show his appreciation for them. Although Evening Star was no longer involved, many of the ideas Iizuka had discussed with Whitehead heavily influenced those he developed with Ohshima; Evening Star received a "special thanks" credit in Superstars.

Development on Superstars began in early 2021 and lasted two and a half years. Ohshima's studio Arzest primarily handled development, with Sonic Team providing support. Shunsuke Kawaraduka directed Superstars, with Iizuka, Ohshima, and Yasuyuki Tsuzuki serving as producers. Iizuka felt Arzest was a natural fit due to their experience developing 2D games for Nintendo. He compared Ohshima's return to a family reunion and said that he had retained his design sensibilities from the Genesis era. Several Sonic Team members, including Iizuka, flew from Burbank, California to Yokohama, Japan to assist. Only four team members—Iizuka, Ohshima, character supervisor Kazuyuki Hoshino, and composer Jun Senoue—worked on the Genesis games.

=== Design ===
Iizuka handled marketing so Ohshima could manage development, though Iizuka noted he was more involved than he normally is with Sonic games. Iizuka wanted Superstars to be a faithful sequel to the Genesis games, and described the goal as blending familiar gameplay with modern high-definition graphics. The designers sought to closely replicate the Genesis gameplay; they first focused on perfecting the physics engine before working on the level design and ensuring they meshed. Superstars was developed from scratch using the Unity game engine, though the physics code was translated from the Mania version of Whitehead's Retro Engine. Replicating the physics proved difficult, and the developers ran the original games while they worked on Superstars so they could cross-reference. To ensure the character handling was accurate, Arzest recreated stages from prior Sonic games in the Superstars engine and overlaid gameplay footage for comparison.

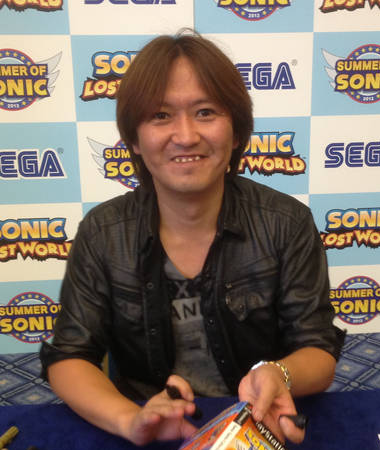
Takashi Iizuka, the writer and producer of Sonic Superstars

In contrast to the previous 2.5D games Sonic the Hedgehog 4: Episode I (2010) and Episode II (2012), which drew from more recent games like Sonic Advance (2001), Iizuka said Superstars was inspired by the Genesis games: the original Sonic the Hedgehog, Sonic the Hedgehog 2 (1992), and Sonic the Hedgehog 3 & Knuckles (1994). The team opted not to continue Mania's pixel art style because they felt it would limit the appeal. They considered using hand-drawn animation, but chose 3D graphics since they could easily replicate the pixel art style. The use of 3D graphics also allowed for elements that could not be accomplished in the Genesis games, such as the characters moving between the foreground and background. The opening cutscene, which uses 2D animation, was produced by Telecom Animation Film and directed by Toshihiko Masuda, who previously worked on the Sonic anime Sonic X (2003–2006).

After working on the physics and level design, the developers began exploring new game mechanics, as Iizuka felt it was important that Superstars be "new, interesting, and innovative". He hoped to provide a new experience after the release of the compilation Sonic Origins (2022), and modernize the series' classic formula. Previous side-scrolling Sonic games featured a set number of acts for each zone, so Arzest decided to use a different number for certain zones to add variety to the pacing. Ohshima created level maps as a base for the developers, and Iizuka provided input and corrections. They felt it was important to pass their knowledge to younger developers. The developers introduced the Chaos Emerald power-ups to motivate players to seek all seven, drawing inspiration from the Wisps in Sonic Colors. They made the power-ups optional to avoid interfering with the classic Sonic gameplay, and included visual indicators to signal when they would be useful. The developers limited themselves to seven power-ups to correlate with the emeralds.

Iizuka said that unlike Sonic Frontiers, which was aimed at gamers, Superstars was designed for children and parents alongside longtime Sonic fans. He wanted Superstars to feel as distinct from Frontiers as possible since he hoped the 2D Sonic games would continue independently from the 3D ones. Sonic Team long wanted to include four-player multiplayer in a Sonic game, but found it difficult to integrate with the series' gameplay. Iizuka said Sonic Team had abandoned the idea, but Ohshima encouraged him to make it work. Levels were designed so they could be played in both single-player and multiplayer, and Sonic Team played several platformers with cooperative gameplay, such as the New Super Mario Bros. series, for inspiration. Implementation proved challenging due to Sonic's speed. Arzest did not include online cooperative multiplayer to avoid lag ruining players' experience.

=== Characters and story ===
Iizuka wrote the story, which, like the Genesis games, is told through character interactions between levels rather than through voice acting and text. Superstars chronologically takes place between Sonic Mania and Sonic Adventure. Unlike contemporary Sonic games, Superstars does not reuse any levels from previous games, such as Green Hill Zone. Iizuka described this as a story-based decision, as Superstars features a new setting.

The title, Sonic Superstars, reflects the game featuring the "superstar" Sonic characters: Sonic, Tails, Knuckles, and Amy. Iizuka said Sonic, Tails, and Knuckles were necessary since they were playable in the Genesis games. Though Amy was introduced in Sonic CD (1993), she was never playable in any of the Genesis games, so the developers felt her being playable would please fans. A playable rabbit character based on one of Ohshima's prototype Sonic designs was included as a skin for Sonic. The developers animated the rabbit based on Ohshima's memories of his movements in prototypes of Sonic the Hedgehog, and Ohshima described the skin as essentially a new playable character. For the battle mode, Ohshima designed robot versions of Amy and Tails.

Sonic Team was surprised by how excited fans were when the obscure characters Mighty the Armadillo and Ray the Flying Squirrel appeared in Sonic Mania, so Arzest decided to bring back a similarly obscure character in Superstars. They chose Fang, an antagonist from the Game Gear Sonic games. Of the characters they considered, Sonic Team and Arzest thought Fang was the most well-known and that his characterization and design fit the direction of Superstars. Additionally, Ohshima designed a new character, Trip, whose armored appearance he based on a sungazer lizard. Iizuka wanted Trip to add story depth, and he worked closely with Ohshima to define her character and appearance. Iizuka sought to distinguish Trip from previous games' powerful villains, such as Infinite from Sonic Forces (2017), with a backstory and characterization "that people can kind of relate to and empathize with and enjoy... because [she] mean[s] something to the world".

=== Music ===
Jun Senoue led a mix of internal Sega staff and external contributors to compose the Superstars soundtrack. Contributors included Takahiro Kai, Tee Lopes, Hidenori Shoji, and Rintaro Soma. Iizuka said the Superstars team sought to remain faithful to the Genesis games' pop style.

== Release ==
Sega announced Sonic Superstars at Summer Game Fest on June 8, 2023, followed by promotion at Gamescom in August. It was released for the Nintendo Switch, PlayStation 4, PlayStation 5, Windows, Xbox One, and Xbox Series X/S on October 17, 2023. Players who signed up for a Sega newsletter prior to January 31, 2024 received a downloadable content (DLC) code that unlocks Amy's modern outfit seen in Sonic Adventure onward, while those who pre-ordered the game received a reversible cover, an acrylic display stand, and a Lego Sonic the Hedgehog-themed Eggman skin. A Lego Sonic skin is also available as free DLC. "Digital Deluxe" DLC includes additional Lego skins, the rabbit skin, an additional Metal Fighter skin for the multiplayer mode, an artbook, a soundtrack, and menu wallpapers. Sega released a promotional animated short, Trio of Trouble, on September 20. On February 15, 2024, a costume based on the character Shadow the Hedgehog was made available as free DLC.

=== Sales ===
Sonic Superstars was released three days before Super Mario Bros. Wonder, a similar side-scrolling platform game for the Switch by Nintendo, which journalists found noteworthy given the rivalry between the Sonic and Super Mario franchises during the 1990s console wars. (Note: Attributed to multiple sources:) GamesIndustry.biz questioned why Sega chose to release a Sonic game so close to a similar Mario game, especially given Sonic's popularity on the Switch. Superstars debuted at fourth place in the UK physical sales charts, behind Wonder; 49% of Superstars' sales were for the Switch. In Japan, it debuted at ninth place, selling 4,128 copies during its first week on sale.

In November, Sega Sammy Holdings' president Haruki Satomi said that initial sales were slightly below what Sega had hoped, which he attributed to competition from other games like Wonder. However, he said Sega was spending 90% of the marketing budget during the Christmas and holiday shopping season and anticipated it would ultimately sell on par with Frontiers. Sega reported in June 2024 that Superstars had sold well. In June 2025, Sega accidentally made confidential sales figures, intended for a presentation to Sega Sammy Holdings management, available for public viewing. The figures revealed that Superstars had sold 2.43 million copies by June 18. In June 2026, Sega Sammy Holdings reported that Superstars had sold 2.8 million copies.

== Reception ==
Reception

Aggregate scores
Aggregator	Score
Metacritic	73/100 (PS5) (Note: Score based on 67 reviews); 67/100 (NS) (Note: Score based on 13 reviews); 76/100 (XSXS) (Note: Score based on 11 reviews)
OpenCritic	60% (Note: Rating based on 81 reviews)

Review scores
Publication	Score
Destructoid	5.5/10
Digital Trends	3/5
Eurogamer	3/5
Famitsu	8/10, 8/10, 8/10, 8/10
Game Informer	7.5/10
GameSpot	7/10
GamesRadar+	4/5
IGN	7/10
Nintendo Life	8/10
Push Square	6/10
TechRadar	4/5
Video Games Chronicle	4/5
VG247	3/5

According to the review aggregate website Metacritic, the Switch and PlayStation 5 versions of Sonic Superstars received "mixed or average reviews", while the Xbox Series X/S version received "generally favorable reviews". On the aggregator OpenCritic, the game has a "Fair" approval rating. In Japan, four critics from Famitsu gave the game a total score of 32 out of 40, with each critic awarding the game an 8 out of 10. The Guardian described the reviews as "solid appraisals", though not acclamatory. Critics felt that Superstars successfully replicated the classic Sonic gameplay from the Genesis era, but criticized its additions as unnecessary or poorly implemented. (Note: Attributed to multiple sources:) Comparisons to previous 2D Sonic games were common; critics generally regarded Superstars as an improvement over Sonic the Hedgehog 4 but inferior to the Genesis games and Sonic Mania. (Note: Attributed to multiple sources:)

The presentation divided critics. While VG247 wished the developers had used pixel art, they thought Superstars was the best take on the classic Sonic art style in 3D. GameSpot, Push Square, and TechRadar praised the visuals as colorful, (Note: Attributed to multiple sources:) and Nintendo Life wrote Superstars "nails [Sonic's] overall aesthetic and art style." Conversely, Digital Trends and Eurogamer called the art style unattractive, Eurogamer writing that zones lacked the detail and identity of those from the older games. GameSpot and IGN praised the soundtrack, which they respectively called "delightful" and "phenomenal", but Digital Trends and Eurogamer found it unremarkable. VG247 said the soundtrack was inconsistent; while some tracks were among the series' best, others were "wack".

Reviewers commended the gameplay for its faithfulness to the Genesis games, and the accuracy of the physics received particular praise. (Note: Attributed to multiple sources:) Game Informer compared playing Superstars to "putting on an old glove", and GamesRadar+ and VG247 said that while they were not one-to-one, the physics were closer to the Genesis games than any previous 2.5D Sonic game. VG247 added the physics never caused frustration as those in Sonic 4 and Sonic Generations had. The level design was generally praised for having multiple routes, (Note: Attributed to multiple sources:) though some critics found difficult-to-avoid obstacles annoying. (Note: Attributed to multiple sources:) IGN wrote that Superstars focused more on exploration, which "create[d] a unique dynamic to each level" but failed to provide the speed they expected from Sonic.

Critics generally disliked the campaign's local multiplayer. (Note: Attributed to multiple sources:) They felt cooperative play did not mesh well with Sonic's design, which emphasizes speed and branching level paths. Push Square summarized Superstars as "[f]undamentally... a really enjoyable side-scrolling Sonic title, but the two big ticket features—chaos emerald powers and co-op—are arguably the worst parts of it."

=== Awards ===
Sonic Superstars was nominated for Best Family Game at the Game Awards 2023, though it lost to Super Mario Bros. Wonder.
