= Prope =

Video game studio

Prope Limited
- Native name: 株式会社プロペ
- Romanized name: Kabushiki-gaisha Purope
- Type: Private
- Industry: Video games
- Founded: May 23, 2006 (Foundation); June 1, 2006 (Operations began)
- Representative Director President: Hiroshi Nakai
- Headquarters: Tokyo, Japan
- Key people: Yuji Naka
- Number of employees: 40 (until April 2017)

Prope Ltd. (株式会社プロペ, Kabushiki-gaisha Purope) is a Japanese video game developer based in Tokyo, founded in 2006 by Sonic the Hedgehog co-creator Yuji Naka upon his departure from Sega. Its name means "near" or "beside" in Latin.

== Formation ==
As part of Sega's "support program for independent game creators", Yuji Naka left Sega to start his own studio, along with ten Sonic Team members. It had a starting capital of ¥10 million, 10% of which came from Sega in exchange for the right of first refusal for publishing his studio's games. Prope was founded on May 23, 2006 and began operations one week later, on June 1.

Prope intended to create games with a graphical style that appealed to both children and adults, and to explore the possibilities of developing both 3D and 2D games. Naka joined Square Enix in January 2018, leaving the status of Prope uncertain. In March 2019, Naka confirmed that Prope had been reduced to a one-person company since the end of April 2017.

Naka released SHOT2048 under the Prope brand in December 2021, his first game following his departure from Square Enix back in April.

== Games ==
Previously, the studio had been consistently linked with a sequel to Nights into Dreams..., though Nights: Journey of Dreams was ultimately developed by Sega Studio USA. Naka has claimed in an interview that he presently has no intention to revisit any of his former Sega properties.

Prope's first two titles, the Wii rhythm game Let's Tap, and the WiiWare game Let's Catch, were both released in December 2008. Both games were published by Sega.

After a series of simplistic iOS games such as 10 Count Boxer and Fluffy Bear, under the iPrope label, Prope's next major game Ivy the Kiwi? was released in November 2009 exclusively for Windows Phone, with Microsoft publishing it. In April 2009, it was ported to WiiWare and DSiWare and published by Bandai Namco in Japan, Xseed Games in America and Rising Star Games in Europe as Prope's parent company Sega refused to publish the game and Bandai Namco decided not to publish the game outside Asia. In 2010, an expanded physical release (in contrast to a digital one) was released for Wii and Nintendo DS, featuring 50 levels (whereas the downloadable version featured 25) as well as original backgrounds and music for each level.

In 2011, Prope released Real Ski Jump, which, as of 2014, had been downloaded 4 million times.

=== iOS/Android ===
Published under the iPrope and aPrope label respectively

- Let's Tap (2009)
- 10 Count Boxer (2009)
- Fluffy Bear (2009)
- Just Half (2010)
- PD -prope discoverer- (2011)
- Real Ski Jump HD
- Get the Time (2011)
- Past Camera (2011) (photography app - not a video game)
- Power of Coin (2011)
- Nine Dungeon (2011)
- Real Animals HD (2011)
- Flick Pig (2011)
- Real SkiJump Battle (2012)
- Ivy the Kiwi? (2012)
- Buddy Monster (2012)
- Real Whales (2013)
- E-Anbai Just Right (2014)
- Samurai Santaro (2014)
- Kodama (2015)
- Real Whales (2015)
- Shock Maze VR (2015)
- Crazy Open Car (2016)
- God & the Bell Kitty (2016)
- 10 Battle (2016)
- Pirates of Coin (2016)
- Kizumon (2017)
- Shot2048 (2021)

=== Nintendo DS ===
- Ivy the Kiwi? (2010)

=== Nintendo 3DS ===
- StreetPass Mansion (2013)
- StreetPass Fishing (2015)
- StreetPass Chef (2016)
- StreetPass Ninja (2016)

=== PlayStation 3 ===
- Digimon All-Star Rumble (2014)

=== PlayStation Portable ===
- Digimon Adventure (2013)

=== Wii ===
- Let's Catch (2008)
- Let's Tap (2008)
- Ivy the Kiwi? (2010)
- Wii Play: Motion (2011) (Trigger Twist and UFO model only)
- Fishing Resort (2011)
- Rodea the Sky Soldier (2015)

=== Windows Mobile ===
- Ivy the Kiwi? (2009)

=== Xbox 360 ===
- Digimon All-Star Rumble (2014)
