= StreetPass Mii Plaza =

Nintendo 3DS game

- Developers: Nintendo SPD; Downloadable content: Good-Feel, Grezzo, Spike Chunsoft, Prope, Arzest
- Release: JP: 26 February 2011; EU: 25 March 2011; NA: 27 March 2011; AU: 31 March 2011
- Platform: Nintendo 3DS
- Type: RPG, puzzle, shoot 'em up, simulation
- Website: www.nintendo.com/en-za/Hardware/Nintendo-3DS-Family/StreetPass/StreetPass-Mii-Plaza/StreetPass-Mii-Plaza-115561.html

StreetPass Mii Plaza (すれちがいMii広場, Surechigai Mī Hiroba) is an application which comes pre-loaded on all Nintendo 3DS systems. In the game, players can meet other players' Miis over StreetPass and formerly online through Nintendo Network and interact with them.

== Summary ==
StreetPass Mii Plaza is an application that makes use of the Nintendo 3DS's StreetPass functionality, in which the system can detect and exchange data with other nearby systems whilst in sleep mode. The game revolves around a player's chosen Mii, which can be customised with accessories earned from minigames, along with a short customisable message and some optional information about likes. When new Miis are registered by the system, they will appear at the gate. Up to ten Miis can show up at the gate at any one time, after which the player will need to use them with their minigames before checking for more. Meeting the same Miis multiple times adds extra functionality, such as personalised messages and the ability to rate them. There are also special Miis that appear via SpotPass during special events, such as Nintendo staff members. After meeting another player's Mii, the player can then use that Mii to play a variety of different games, three of them being playable free of charge: Puzzle Swap, StreetPass Quest and StreetPass Quest II (known as Find Mii and Find Mii II in the US region respectively).

After the December 2011 update (2.0), extra features were added to the game including a map in which players can see which countries they have met the most Miis from (not all countries have this feature) and a music player which features unlockable tracks of music from the game and an accomplishments section. Another update was added in June 2013, introducing four new purchasable games, as well as a new interface and frame-rate improvements. Following this update, players can earn Plaza Tickets from purchasable games which can be exchanged for hats and outfits to customise their Mii. A second update, which adds two more purchasable games and additional features, was released in April 2015. A third update, which adds five more purchasable games and increases the capacity of StreetPass hits per session to 100, was implemented in September 2016.

All of the purchasable content on the application (including all purchasable games) are no longer made available for download after the Nintendo eShop for the 3DS systems closed on 27 March 2023. Despite this, they can still be redownloaded if the user has already purchased them prior to the shop's closure. Due to application's reliance on the eShop to download these additional contents, any attempts at buying any purchasable content directly from the application without purchasing it beforehand will fail, causing the application to hang and then unexpectedly close. This is because the application tries to obtain the metadata for them via the eShop, which is no longer available.

== Preloaded games ==
=== Puzzle Swap ===
Puzzle Swap (ピースあつめの旅, Pīsu Atsume no Tabi; lit. 'Journey of the Piece Gatherer') is a game in which players aim to complete a 3D animated picture of a Nintendo video game by gathering its pieces. If a player encountered on StreetPass possesses any pieces the player does not have, the player can choose one of their pieces to add to their own. The player may also use Play Coins to buy random pieces for their existing panels, although it won't always be a new piece. After the December 2011 update, new puzzles became available which included four or eight pink squares in the centre. Pink pieces are distributed to players via SpotPass and can only be gathered via StreetPass; they cannot be bought using Play Coins. Some puzzles have more pieces than others, making them harder to complete.

List of available puzzles
| Title | Pieces | Availability | Release | Additional details | Ref. |
|---|---|---|---|---|---|
| Metroid: Other M | 15 | ^{JP} ^{NA} ^{PAL} | WW: Launch day | —N/a | |
| Mario and Bowser | 15 | ^{JP} ^{NA} ^{PAL} | WW: Launch day | In addition to Mario and Bowser, Luigi is also featured. | |
| Super Mario Galaxy 2 | 15 | ^{JP} ^{NA} ^{PAL} | WW: Launch day | —N/a | |
| The Legend of Zelda | 15 | ^{JP} ^{NA} ^{PAL} | WW: Launch day | Based on The Legend of Zelda: Twilight Princess. | |
| Kirby's Dream Land | 15 | ^{JP} ^{NA} ^{PAL} | WW: Launch day | Based on the Kirby series in general. | |
| Pikmin | 15 | ^{JP} ^{NA} ^{PAL} | WW: Launch day | Based on the first Pikmin instalment. | |
| New Super Mario Bros. Wii | 15 | ^{JP} ^{NA} ^{PAL} | WW: Launch day | —N/a | |
| The Legend of Zelda: Ocarina of Time 3D | 24 | ^{JP} ^{NA} ^{PAL} | WW: 6 December 2011 | —N/a | |
| Star Fox 64 3D | 24 | ^{JP} ^{NA} ^{PAL} | WW: 6 December 2011 | —N/a | |
| Super Mario 3D Land | 40 | ^{JP} ^{NA} ^{PAL} | WW: 6 December 2011 | —N/a | |
| Mario Kart 7 | 40 | ^{JP} ^{NA} ^{PAL} | WW: 6 December 2011 | —N/a | |
| ^{NA}Rhythm Heaven Fever^{PAL}Beat the Beat: Rhythm Paradise^{JP}Minna no Rhythm Tengoku | 24 | ^{JP} ^{NA} ^{PAL} | WW: 6 December 2011 | —N/a | |
| Donkey Kong Country Returns | 24 | ^{JP} ^{NA} ^{PAL} | WW: 6 December 2011 | —N/a | |
| Pilotwings Resort | 24 | ^{JP} ^{NA} ^{PAL} | WW: 6 December 2011 | —N/a | |
| Kid Icarus: Uprising | 40 | ^{JP} ^{NA} ^{PAL} | WW: 26 February 2012 | —N/a | |
| ^{JP/NA}Fire Emblem Awakening^{PAL}Fire Emblem: Awakening | 40 | ^{JP} ^{NA} ^{PAL} | JP: 21 April 2012; NA: 31 January 2013; PAL: 12 April 2013 | —N/a | |
| Mario Tennis Open | 40 | ^{JP} ^{NA} ^{PAL} | WW: 21 April 2012 | —N/a | |
| Kirby's 20th Anniversary | 40 | ^{JP} ^{NA} ^{PAL} | WW: 19 July 2012 | Based on Kirby's Dream Collection: Special Edition. | |
| Brain Age: Concentration Training^{PAL/AUS}Dr. Kawashima's Devilish Brain Training | 24 | ^{JP} ^{NA} | JP: 19 July 2012; NA: 21 February 2013; EU: July 2017 | —N/a | |
| Big Mac | 15 | ^{JP} | JP: 3 August 2012 | Was only obtainable at McDonald's restaurants. Ceased on 13 September 2012. | |
| ANAでDS | 15 | ^{JP} | JP: 12 August 2012 | Was only obtainable at three ANA airports. Ceased on 30 September 2012. | |
| New Super Mario Bros. 2 | 40 | ^{JP} ^{NA} ^{PAL} | WW: 9 August 2012 | —N/a | |
| ^{NA}Kirby's Return to Dream Land^{PAL/AUS}Kirby's Adventure Wii | 40 | ^{JP} ^{NA} ^{PAL} | WW: 7 November 2012 | —N/a | |
| Animal Crossing: New Leaf | 40 | ^{JP} ^{NA} ^{PAL} | JP: 7 November 2012; WW: 17 May 2013 | —N/a | |
| ^{NA}Luigi's Mansion: Dark Moon^{JP/PAL/AUS}Luigi's Mansion 2 | 40 | ^{JP} ^{NA} ^{PAL} | WW: 23 March 2013 | —N/a | |
| Dillon's Rolling Western: The Last Ranger | 40 | ^{JP} ^{NA} ^{PAL} ^{AUS} | JP: 24 May 2013; NA: 24 May 2013; PAL: 25 June 2013 | —N/a | |
| Heroines / Nintendo Starlets | 40 | ^{JP} ^{NA} ^{PAL} | JP: 18 June 2013; PAL: 18 June 2013; NA: 12 July 2013 | Features five female Nintendo characters: Peach, Pauline, Rosalina and two versions of Zelda from The Legend of Zelda: Spirit Tracks and The Legend of Zelda: Skyward Sword. | |
| Xenoblade Chronicles | 40 | ^{JP} ^{NA} ^{PAL} | JP: 18 June 2013; PAL: 18 June 2013; NA: 12 July 2013 | —N/a | |
| New Super Mario Bros. U + New Super Luigi U | 40 | ^{JP} ^{NA} ^{PAL} | JP: 18 June 2013; PAL: 18 June 2013; NA: 12 July 2013 | —N/a | |
| The Legend of Zelda: Skyward Sword | 40 | ^{JP} ^{NA} ^{PAL} | JP: 18 June 2013; PAL: 18 June 2013; NA: 12 July 2013 | —N/a | |
| ^{NA}Mario & Luigi: Dream Team^{PAL}Mario & Luigi: Dream Team Bros.^{JP}Mario & Luigi RPG 4: Dream Adventure | 40 | ^{JP} ^{NA} ^{PAL} | JP: 11 July 2013; PAL: 11 July 2013; NA: 17 July 2013 | —N/a | |
| ^{NA}Chibi-Robo! Photo Finder^{JP}Chibi-Robo! Photography | 40 | ^{JP} ^{NA} | JP: 7 August 2013; NA: 5 January 2014 | —N/a | |
| ^{JP}Darumeshi Sports Shop^{NA}Rusty's Real Deal Baseball | 24 | ^{JP} ^{NA} ^{KR} | JP: 6 September 2013; NA: 11 April 2014 | The North American, Japanese and Korean versions each feature different appearances based on their respective localisations; therefore pieces cannot be exchanged across different regions. | |
| Pokémon X and Y | 40 | ^{JP} ^{NA} ^{PAL} | WW: 12 October 2013 | —N/a | |
| Monster Hunter 4 Ultimate | 40 | ^{JP} ^{NA} ^{PAL} | JP: 18 December 2013; NA: 15 January 2015; PAL: 15 January 2015 | This is the first puzzle that is based on a video game made by a third party. | |
| Kirby: Triple Deluxe | 40 | ^{JP} ^{NA} ^{PAL} | JP: 26 December 2013; NA: 2 May 2014; PAL: 9 May 2014 | —N/a | |
| Super Mario 3D World | 40 | ^{JP} ^{NA} ^{PAL} | WW: 21 February 2014 | —N/a | |
| Yoshi's New Island | 40 | ^{NA PAL} | NA: 28 March 2014; PAL: 28 March 2014 | —N/a | |
| Nintendo Pocket Football Club | 15 | ^{JP} ^{PAL} | JP: 26 June 2014; PAL: 26 June 2014 | —N/a | |
| Mega Man | 40 | ^{NA} ^{PAL} | NA: 7 August 2014 | —N/a | |
| ^{JP}Kirby Fighters X / Dedede's Drum Dash X^{NA/PAL/KR}Kirby Fighters Deluxe / Dedede's Drum Dash Deluxe | 24 | ^{JP} ^{NA} ^{PAL} ^{KR} | JP: July 2014; NA: 29 August 2014; KOR: September 2014; PAL: 8 February 2015 | —N/a | |
| Daigasso! Band Brothers P | 40 | ^{JP} | JP: August 2014 | —N/a | |
| Fantasy Life | 40 | ^{NA} ^{PAL} | PAL: 26 September 2014; NA: 27 October 2014 | —N/a | |
| Pikmin Short Movies: The Night Juicer | 15 | ^{JP} ^{NA} ^{PAL} | WW: 6 November 2014 | —N/a | |
| Pikmin Short Movies: Treasure in a Bottle | 15 | ^{JP} ^{NA} ^{PAL} | WW: 6 November 2014 | —N/a | |
| Pikmin Short Movies: Occupational Hazards | 15 | ^{JP} ^{NA} ^{PAL} | WW: 6 November 2014 | —N/a | |
| Ultimate NES Remix | 40 | ^{NA} ^{PAL} | PAL: 7 November 2014; NA: 6 December 2014 | —N/a | |
| Sonic Boom | 40 | ^{JP} ^{NA} ^{PAL} | NA: 11 November 2014; PAL: 11 November 2014 | —N/a | |
| Captain Toad: Treasure Tracker | 40 | ^{JP} ^{NA} | JP: 13 November 2014; NA: 5 December 2014; PAL: 20 December 2014 | —N/a | |
| Super Smash Bros. for Nintendo 3DS and Wii U | 40 | ^{JP} ^{NA} ^{PAL} | JP: December 2014; NA: 14 February 2015; PAL: 14 February 2015 | —N/a | |
| Monster Hunter | 40 | ^{JP} ^{NA} ^{PAL} | JP: March 2015; NA: April 2015; PAL: 2015 | —N/a | |
| Tomodachi Life Friendship Fiesta | 24 | ^{PAL} | PAL: 30 July 2015 | | |
| Picross 3D: Round 2 | 15 | ^{JP} | JP: 25 September 2015 | —N/a | |
| YO-KAI WATCH | 40 | ^{JP NA PAL} | WW: 2015 | | |
| ^{NA}Mario & Luigi: Paper Jam^{PAL}Mario & Luigi: Paper Jam Bros.^{JP}Mario & Luigi RPG: Paper Mario MIX | 15 | ^{JP} ^{NA} ^{PAL} | JP: 20 November 2015; NA: 2016; PAL: 20 November 2015 | —N/a | |
| Animal Crossing: Happy Home Designer | 40 | ^{JP} ^{NA} ^{PAL} | WW: 2015 | —N/a | |
| Final Fantasy Explorers | 40 | ^{JP} ^{NA} ^{PAL} | WW: 2016 | —N/a | |
| Kirby: Planet Robobot | 40 | ^{JP} ^{NA} ^{PAL} | WW: 2016 | —N/a | |
| Culdcept Revolt | 40 | ^{JP} ^{NA} ^{PAL} | WW: 2016 | —N/a | |
| Metroid Prime: Federation Force | 40 | ^{JP} ^{NA} ^{PAL} | WW: 2016 | —N/a | |

=== StreetPass Quest / Find Mii ===
StreetPass Quest (すれちがい伝説, Surechigai Densetsu; lit. 'StreetPass Legend'), known in North America as Find Mii, is a role-playing game. In this game, the player's Mii has been captured and it is up to the player to save them by battling their way through a series of rooms containing different enemies. Players use the Miis they have encountered, but can also use Play Coins to summon additional wanderers. Each Mii has a standard attack and a magic spell based on their colour. For example, red Miis can cast flame spells whilst light-blue Miis can freeze their opponents. Certain-coloured Miis are required to clear certain rooms, such as using a yellow Mii to break an enemy's yellow shield. If a Mii is encountered on StreetPass several times, their level in StreetPass Quest will increase, making them stronger, but only up to level seven. As the player progresses through the game, they can earn hats for their Mii to wear.

StreetPass Quest II / Find Mii II became available in December 2011 for players who had played through the first game at least twice. The sequel includes tougher enemies, multiple paths and new hats. In addition to wanderers, players can now use Play Coins to hire up to three previously encountered Miis. In battle, similarly coloured Miis can form teams to perform stronger combo attacks and spells. Play Coins can also be spent to use potions for various uses, such as clearing a room of gas. There is also a third secret quest that adds more difficulty to the StreetPass Quest II / Streetpass Quest/Find Mii II maps that provides an additional set of hats that the player can win.

A stage based on StreetPass Quest / Find Mii appears in Super Smash Bros. for Nintendo 3DS. Two themes called Dark Lord and Save the World, Heroes!, which are music from Find Mii, appear as playable music that play on the StreetPass Quest / Find Mii stage in Super Smash Bros. for Nintendo 3DS and on the Miiverse stage in Super Smash Bros. for Wii U. Both the stage and music return in Super Smash Bros. Ultimate and new theme track music called Find Mii / Find Mii II Medley (StreetPass Quest / StreetPass Quest II Medley).

== Paid games (DLC) ==
On 18 June 2013 in Japan and Europe and 12 July 2013 in North America, the first major update to the StreetPass Mii Plaza added four new games, which could be purchased and added to the Mii Plaza. In the new games, players can earn Plaza Tickets that can be exchanged for hats and accessories.

On 16 April 2015 a second major update (4.0) added two new games: StreetPass Fishing and StreetPass Zombies.

In September 2016 a third major update (5.0) introduced five new purchasable games: StreetPass Slot Racer, StreetPass Trader, StreetPass Chef, StreetPass Explorers and StreetPass Ninja. One of the former two could be downloaded for free. These games were designed to be quick to play; Plaza Tickets, hats and accessories are not available through them.

=== StreetPass Squad / Mii Force ===
StreetPass Squad (すれちがいシューティング, Surechigai Shūtingu; lit. 'StreetPass Shooting'), known in North America as Mii Force, is a side-scrolling shoot 'em up game developed by Good-Feel. The game revolves around the Mii Force, led by the player, as they battle against the evil Gold Bone Gang. Players traverse each level blasting through enemies and recovering Miis encountered on StreetPass, who each provide unique weaponry based on their colour. Miis are arranged on a grid of three forward-facing weapons and one rear weapon, which can be rotated to shoot in multiple directions, with additional Miis powering up the main weapons when placed behind them on the grid. If the player is hit, one of the Miis will be forced to retreat, and the game ends if the player loses all of their Miis. After completing the main campaign, players unlock Arcade mode, which tasks players with clearing the campaign in one run. The game also features leaderboards, encouraging players to beat scores set by people encountered on StreetPass.

=== StreetPass Garden / Flower Town ===
StreetPass Garden (すれちがいガ～デン, Surechigai Gāden), known in North America as Flower Town, is a gardening game developed by Grezzo. The game is loosely based on Mendelian genetics, in which players grow various types of plants, aiming to become a Master Gardener by growing twenty unique breeds of plants. Growing plants are watered by visiting Miis encountered on StreetPass. After a flower has bloomed, players can receive new seeds by breeding their plant with plants of other Miis. Flowers can be arranged in several gardens where the player may take screenshots that are saved to the Nintendo 3DS Camera. Flowers and unwanted seeds can be sold for money, which can be spent on new accessories, seeds and plots. Job quests are available where the player is tasked with growing plants of specific qualities to fulfil customer requirements.

=== StreetPass Battle / Warrior's Way ===
StreetPass Battle (すれちがい合戦, Surechigai Gassen), known in North America as Warrior's Way, is a battle-simulation game developed by Spike Chunsoft. Players assume the role of a general on a quest to conquer the world one country at a time. Players amass armies either by encountering other players on StreetPass or using Play Coins to recruit mercenaries, before taking on the leaders of each country. Battles follow a rock, paper, scissors mechanic, in which players assign soldiers to three classes, with each have strengths and weaknesses against the other classes, and pit them against the opponent, the first to win two matches winning the battle and earning a portion of their soldiers. Defeating certain leaders earns materials which can be used to upgrade the player's castle, granting new options. Players encountered on StreetPass will be monarchs if they have StreetPass Battle. The player may choose to greet the monarch peacefully or challenge them to a battle in order to earn more soldiers.

=== StreetPass Mansion / Monster Manor ===
StreetPass Mansion (すれちがい迷宮, Surechigai Meikyū; lit. 'StreetPass Labyrinth'), known in North America as Monster Manor, is a puzzle RPG developed by Prope. Taking place in a haunted mansion, players create rooms by laying out map pieces given to them by StreetPass-encountered players. Laying pieces of the same colour together expands the room, sometimes revealing treasure chests that offer new weapons and items. The main task is to uncover the stairs to the next floor in order to progress. When entering a new room, the player may encounter an enemy, which they must face against using their equipped weapon, which uses rechargeable batteries to function. During battle, the player can either fire at the enemy, which uses one battery charge, or defend against the enemy's attack, which slowly drains the battery meter. Defeating enemies earns experience points which can power up the equipped weapon. There are various types of weapon, some of which are more effective against certain enemies. If the player runs out of health points, they will faint and their session will end.

=== StreetPass Fishing / Ultimate Angler ===
StreetPass Fishing (すれちがいフィッシング, Surechigai Fisshingu), known in North America as Ultimate Angler, is a simulation game developed by Prope. In this game, players use bait received from Miis encountered on StreetPass to try and catch various species of fish across several islands. Each type of fish have certain types of bait they are attracted to, and players can combine bait together in order to catch larger fish. Each island is split up into multiple areas, which are unlocked after players manage to catch a certain type of fish. In addition to the five main islands players can fish across, additional islands can be accessed by encountering Miis from different regions and countries. Catching fish and clearing challenges earns money that can be used to upgrade various fishing rods that they receive during the game, or purchase and upgrade aquariums used to store fish caught during each session, which can be shared with people encountered on StreetPass.

=== StreetPass Zombies / Battleground Z ===
StreetPass Zombies (すれちがいゾンビ, Surechigai Zonbi), known in North America as Battleground Z, is an action game developed by Good-Feel. The game tasks players with battling against hordes of zombies in order to clear each level's objective. Miis that are encountered via StreetPass can be found across each level, each carrying a unique weapon such as a Wii Remote, a bowling ball and a paintbrush, which each have a limited number of chargeable special attacks. Players receive these weapons by encountering each Mii, with some Miis offering to team up and fight alongside the player. If the player takes too much damage, they will lose their current weapon, and the level ends if the player loses all of their weapons or fail the main objective (the player has three chances to attempt each level per session). Clearing various criteria, such as beating a level within a time limit, earns medals.

=== StreetPass Slot Racer / Slot Car Rivals ===
StreetPass Slot Racer (サクッと! スロットカー, Sakutto! Surotto Kā), known in North America as Slot Car Rivals, is a racing game developed by Good-Feel. StreetPass Slot Racer involves the player racing up to 10 other players along a selection of courses. As different achievements are gained, the number of courses available increases and "special" cars become available. Standard cars are customisable, but none of the special cars are. The game completes when the player beats the world champion (although a faster time is available to play against after this).

=== StreetPass Trader / Market Crashers ===
StreetPass Trader, known in North America as Market Crashers, is a business simulation game developed by Good-Feel. This game is based on a stock–buying-and-selling game, and features various companies (all based on other StreetPass Mii Plaza games, for example "Conqueror Construction" being inspired by StreetPass Battle / Warrior's Way). The stocks become more volatile the further the player progresses, but there are also purchasing opportunities and achievements available.

=== StreetPass Chef / Feed Mii ===
StreetPass Chef (サクッと! 勇者食堂; lit. 'Quick! Brave Restaurant'), known in North America as Feed Mii, is a cookery simulation game developed by Prope. It is based in the same world as StreetPass Quest / Find Mii, although has no effect on gameplay in the game. The concept involves cooking required dishes with 10 ingredients (which can be purchased with play coins or supplied by StreetPassed Miis). Selecting the right ingredients leads to higher points and so the Miis make more progress in the quest adventure.

=== StreetPass Explorers / Mii Trek ===
StreetPass Explorers, known in North America as Mii Trek, is an adventure game developed by Arzest. This game is based on players travelling through areas on a quest to find artifacts and document animals and cryptids, recruiting explorers who provide steps to the player using the pedometer feature on the 3DS. Throughout the play session, explorers can become lost. The session stops when no more explorers remain.

=== StreetPass Ninja / Ninja Launcher ===
StreetPass Ninja (サクッと! 大砲忍者; lit. 'Quick! Cannon Launcher'), known in North America as Ninja Launcher, is a shooter game developed by Prope. The game involves your character being shot out of a cannon in order to defeat enemies. Your character for the play session is weaponless, unless they can grab armament scrolls dangling from kites held by Miis that are encountered through StreetPass or recruited using Play Coins. Two difficulty modes are available with high scores that are recorded, such as fewest shots to clear the game.

== Reception ==
Reception

Review scores
| Publication | Score |
|---|---|
| IGN | 8.5/10 (Mii Force); 5/10 (Flower Town); 7/10 (Warrior's Way); 7.9/10 (Monster Manor) |
| Nintendo World Report | 6.5/10 (Market Crashers); 9/10 (Mii Force); 6/10 (Warrior's Way); 7.5/10 (Ultimate Angler); 8/10 (Battleground Z) |
| Cubed3 | 9/10 (StreetPass Quest); 6/10 (Puzzle Swap) |
| Metro | 8/10 (StreetPass Squad); 4/10 (StreetPass Garden); 6/10 (StreetPass Battle); 8/10 (StreetPass Mansion) |

Upon releasing its first DLC games, the four games earned a collective total of 4 million dollars within the first month. As stated in an interview with Satoru Iwata, over 200,000 people purchased games for the software in that initial month. Despite minimal advertising for the downloadable games, the games were widely purchased in Japan and surpassed 1.1 billion yen in sales.

StreetPass Mii Plaza received generally positive reviews, with gaming journalists complimenting the built-in software. While most games gathered positive reception, the main point of criticism became the price and lack of content for certain DLC games.

The functionality of StreetPass was complimented in initial reviews of the Nintendo 3DS, with StreetPass Quest utilising StreetPass in a unique way for its RPG-style gameplay. Puzzle Swap was complimented for its inventive premise of collecting puzzles based on Nintendo series, but was also criticised for not being as in-depth as other built-in software such as Face Raiders and AR Games.

The first wave of DLC games received similarly positive reception, with StreetPass Squad / Mii Force and StreetPass Mansion / Monster Manor being standout titles. Compared to the pre-installed games, the games included in the first DLC pack were more complicated and featured more interesting gameplay mechanics. StreetPass Squad was praised for its difficulty and strategy, with some complaints towards the short length of the game. IGN described it as one of the best StreetPass games, complimenting it for giving the player an incentive to master each stage with a high score system. They also noted that the need for collecting more Miis limits them from playing for longer. StreetPass Mansion was similarly praised as a great StreetPass game, being compared as a "more fleshed-out version of Find Mii". Reviewers were more critical of StreetPass Garden and StreetPass Battle, pointing out their lack of content and slower gameplay, along with the requirement that players had to pass others who bought the DLC in order to access many in-game features.

Nintendo World Report reviewed StreetPass Zombies, praising the gameplay and ridiculous story along with the satisfying nature of beating up zombies with different weapons. They also reviewed StreetPass Trader, giving it more criticism. While they appreciated the accurate depiction of the stock market and the many references to other StreetPass Mii Plaza games, they criticised the game for control lag, a heavy reliance on luck, and the less engaging gameplay.
