= Shadow Generations =

Sonic X Shadow Generations
- The international cover art of Sonic X Shadow Generations, which includes Shadow Generations
- Developer: Sonic Team
- Publisher: Sega
- Directors: Katsuyuki Shigihara; Yuka Kobayashi
- Producers: Takashi Iizuka; Shun Nakamura
- Designers: Seiki Hayashi; Takeki Kani
- Programmer: Kohei Moriya
- Artist: Keiichi Matate
- Writer: Ian Flynn
- Composer: Jun Senoue
- Series: Sonic the Hedgehog
- Platforms: Nintendo Switch; PlayStation 4; PlayStation 5; Windows; Xbox One; Xbox Series X/S; Nintendo Switch 2
- Release: Nintendo Switch, PS4, PS5, Windows, Xbox One, Xbox Series X/S: WW: October 25, 2024; Nintendo Switch 2: WW: June 5, 2025
- Genre: Platform
- Mode: Single-player

Shadow Generations (Note: Japanese: シャドウ ジェネレーションズ, Hepburn: Shadō Jenerēshonzu) is a 2024 platform game developed by Sonic Team and published by Sega. It is the second Sonic the Hedgehog game to feature Shadow as the protagonist, following Shadow the Hedgehog (2005). Its story runs parallel to Sonic Generations (2011), and sees Shadow travel through time as he faces his arch-nemesis Black Doom. Like Sonic Generations, the levels and bosses are drawn from previous Sonic games; it also includes levels and game mechanics from games released after Sonic Generations.

Shadow Generations is not available as a standalone game, instead being bundled with a remaster of Sonic Generations in Sonic X Shadow Generations. (Note: Japanese: ソニック × シャドウ ジェネレーションズ, Hepburn: Sonikku × Shadō Jenerēshonzu) It was released on October 25, 2024, for the Nintendo Switch, PlayStation 4, PlayStation 5, Xbox One, Xbox Series X/S, and Windows to generally favorable reviews. The game has been a commercial success, selling two million copies by January 2025. It was released as a Nintendo Switch 2 launch game on June 5, 2025.

== Gameplay ==
Shadow the Hedgehog grinds on a rail in Space Colony ARK, the first stage.

Shadow Generations is a platform game that shifts between side-scrolling and 3D gameplay. Being included in Sonic X Shadow Generations, players can switch between Shadow Generations and the 2011 game Sonic Generations. As Shadow the Hedgehog, the player character of the single-player game, the player must complete a series of levels and bosses to defeat the alien warlord Black Doom.

Similar to Modern Sonic in Sonic Generations, Shadow can boost for extra speed, home in on enemies to attack, and stomp downwards to smash through obstacles and enemies. Unlike Sonic, Shadow can obtain power-ups granting him new abilities. By defeating enemies, the player fills a meter that allows Shadow to activate "Chaos Control", which stops time, freezes objects, and allows access to alternate paths. As the player progresses, they unlock transformations enabling new methods of attack and traversal. These include attacking multiple enemies with light constructed spears, surfing on water, launching larger enemies to teleport long distances, morphing into an alien to traverse certain terrain, and gliding through the air.

Unlike Sonic Generations' side-scrolling hub world, the hub world in Shadow Generations is 3D and features open-world gameplay similar to that of Sonic Frontiers (2022). Players use it to become accustomed to transformations and to access levels and bosses. Each level has two acts; the first features 3D gameplay, while the second features side-scrolling gameplay. Two challenge stages are available for each act, which feature altered stage layouts and require Shadow to complete a specific objective, such as destroying a certain number of enemies or reaching the goal with only one ring. Completing both challenges grants the player a key to unlock boss battles, where the player must deplete the health of a larger enemy to proceed. Every challenge must be completed to finish the game.

Each act and challenge stage contains three hidden tokens used to open chests located throughout White Space. These unlock bonus content including concept art, summaries of Shadow's roles in previous Sonic games, and music tracks that can be played during stages. Additional artwork and music can be unlocked by clearing challenges in White Space and finding parts for Orbot and Cubot's rocket. Players can also collect pages of Gerald Robotnik's journal, which detail the story of Shadow's in-universe creation from Gerald's perspective. A set of more difficult challenges and bosses are unlocked after completing the game. By purchasing additional downloadable content (DLC), players can equip an alternate skin for Shadow based on his prototype "Terios" design.

=== Levels ===
Shadow Generations' levels and bosses, like those in Sonic Generations, are drawn from previous Sonic games, including some from games released after the original Sonic Generations. An additional level, based on scenes from the 2024 film Sonic the Hedgehog 3, was released as DLC on December 12, 2024.

Levels
Stage	Original appearance
Space Colony ARK	Sonic Adventure 2 (2001)
Rail Canyon	Sonic Heroes (2003)
Kingdom Valley	Sonic the Hedgehog (2006)
Sunset Heights	Sonic Forces (2017)
Chaos Island	Sonic Frontiers (2022)
Radical Highway	Sonic Adventure 2 (2001)
Tokyo (DLC)	Sonic the Hedgehog 3 (2024)

Bosses
Boss	Stage	Original appearance
Biolizard	Cannon's Core	Sonic Adventure 2 (2001)
Metal Overlord	Final Fortress	Sonic Heroes (2003)
Mephiles	Dusty Desert	Sonic the Hedgehog (2006)
Devil Doom / Neo Devil Doom	Doom Zone	Shadow the Hedgehog (2005) / Shadow Generations (2024)

== Plot ==
While Rouge the Bat and others attend Sonic the Hedgehog's birthday party, (Note: As depicted in Sonic Generations (2011)) Shadow the Hedgehog travels to the derelict Space Colony ARK to investigate a report of strange activity. He discovers Black Doom, the leader of the Black Arms alien race and one of Shadow's creators, survived his defeat (Note: As depicted in Shadow the Hedgehog (2005)) and pursues him. Shadow finds the fake Chaos Emerald previously created by Miles "Tails" Prower, (Note: As depicted in Sonic Adventure 2 (2001)) but he is caught in a time anomaly created by the Time Eater and pulled into the realm of White Space, where Black Doom's base, the Black Moon, hovers. As Shadow explores White Space, he discovers relics that cause his body to mutate and develop new powers. Black Doom plans to use the time anomaly's power to revive his forces and conquer the world, warning Shadow that the two will battle once his powers fully awaken. Shadow encounters Maria and Gerald Robotnik, pulled from a time before their deaths, and wonders if he can avert their fates.

As Shadow's powers grow, the Black Moon begins mutating. Gerald explains that because they are linked by blood, Black Doom and the Black Moon are growing more powerful as Shadow's powers develop; he deduces that Black Doom plans to control Shadow or use him as a new body once his powers fully manifest. Shadow and Sonic cross paths, with Sonic taking Shadow's Chaos Emerald after a battle; Shadow reveals to Rouge that Sonic took the fake emerald and that he still has the real one. Once Shadow and the Black Moon fully mutate, Black Doom demands that Shadow face him. Shadow enters the Black Moon to confront Black Doom, who transforms into Devil Doom and later Neo Devil Doom; Shadow kills him and destroys the Black Moon, losing his powers in the process. As Shadow returns to Gerald and Maria, the loss of Black Doom's power causes them to begin fading back to their time. Shadow is reluctant to leave them to their fates, but Maria encourages him to let them go and move on. Shadow leaves with Rouge to swap his Chaos Emerald with the fake one before Sonic and Classic Sonic confront the Time Eater.

== Development ==
Shadow Generations is part of "Fearless: Year of Shadow", a 2024 Sonic the Hedgehog marketing campaign centering around Shadow the Hedgehog to commemorate both the release of the game and of the film Sonic the Hedgehog 3, in which Shadow is prominently featured. Katsuyuki Shigihara, one of Sonic Generations' designers, directed Shadow Generations; other Sonic Team members who worked on Generations contributed. Sonic series producer Takashi Iizuka said that, as in Sonic Generations, Sonic Team chose to revisit levels from past Sonic games to recall Shadow's history. They chose levels they found the most interesting and the most popular among fans, while integrating Sonic Frontiers' open-world gameplay to add modern elements.

=== Music ===
Jun Senoue served as the sound director for Shadow Generations, having previously done so for the original Sonic Generations. Senoue worked alongside a team of internal Sega staff including Kenichi Tokoi, Yuzuru Jinma and Hiro, and external contributors such as TeddyLoid, TORIENA, Audissi Studios, Circuit Freq, The Qemists and RichaadEB. Additionally, bands in which Senoue is a member—Sonic Adventure Music Experience and Crush 40—contributed to the musical score.

The soundtrack album, titled "Perfect | Reflections - Sonic X Shadow Generations Original Soundtrack", was released on December 25, 2024. The soundtrack also includes the score for the animated prologue Sonic X Shadow Generations: Dark Beginnings, along with an original song written for the animation, "Without You", performed by Casey Lee Williams.

== Release ==
Sega announced Shadow Generations alongside a remaster of Sonic Generations on January 31, 2024, as a bundle dubbed Sonic X Shadow Generations, during one of PlayStation's State of Play livestreams. The collection was released for the Nintendo Switch, PlayStation 4, PlayStation 5, Xbox One, Xbox Series X/S, and Windows on October 25, 2024. Video Games Chronicle compared this to Nintendo bundling the Super Mario game Bowser's Fury (2021) alongside a rerelease of Super Mario 3D World (2013).

An additional level based on scenes from the film Sonic the Hedgehog 3 was released as DLC on December 12, a week before the film's release. During the level, Shadow's appearance changes to resemble his appearance in the film; Keanu Reeves, who voices Shadow in the film, reprised his role for the DLC.

A Nintendo Switch 2 version was released on June 5, 2025, the console's launch date.

=== Marketing ===
Those who pre-ordered the physical game received a booklet containing the pages from Gerald's journal and a reversible cover art based on the Japanese cover. A digital deluxe edition includes the Terios skin; additional in-game music tracks; a digital art book and soundtrack containing a selection of tracks from other Sonic games; and the Sonic the Hedgehog 3 DLC.

A three-episode animated prologue miniseries, Sonic X Shadow Generations: Dark Beginnings, animated by Studio Giggex and SIMAGE animation, and written by Ian Flynn, was released between September 25 and October 10, 2024. An extended version of the prologue containing the original animatic and deleted scenes is available as free DLC for the PlayStation versions of the game.

Sega collaborated with Limited Run Games to produce a collector's edition including the soundtrack, an art book, a keychain with Sonic and Shadow's shoes, Chao figurines, a statue of Sonic and Shadow standing on a Dreamcast, a SteelBook case, and a mock Dreamcast jewel case. The collector's edition was available for order between August 19 and October 6, 2024. This release was criticized for its multiple delays and poor quality of the statue.

=== Sales ===
Sonic X Shadow Generations sold one million copies by October 25, 2024, the day of its wide release; players could access the game up to three days early by purchasing the digital deluxe edition on any platform except the Nintendo Switch. On November 22, 2024, Sega announced that worldwide sales had surpassed 1.5 million copies, and by January 24, 2025, the game had sold over 2 million copies. By June 2026, it had sold 3 million copies.

== Reception ==
Sonic X Shadow Generations

Aggregate scores
Aggregator	Score
Metacritic	80/100 (PS5) (Note: Based on 80 reviews); 82/100 (NS) (Note: Based on 7 reviews); 79/100 (NS2) (Note: Based on 31 reviews); 77/100 (XSXS) (Note: Based on 8 reviews)
OpenCritic	82% recommend (Note: Based on 111 reviews)

Review scores
Publication	Score
Digital Trends	3.5/5
Eurogamer	3/5
Game Informer	8.5/10
GameSpot	6/10 (PS5)
Hardcore Gamer	4/5 (PS5)
IGN	9/10 (PS5)
Nintendo Life	9/10 (Switch)
Nintendo World Report	8/10 (Switch)
Push Square	8/10 (PS5)
Shacknews	8/10
TechRadar	4/5 stars
Video Games Chronicle	4/5 stars
VG247	4/5

According to Metacritic, the Sonic X Shadow Generations bundle received "generally favorable" reviews from critics. According to OpenCritic, 82% of critics recommended it. IGN wrote that "This bulked-up remaster soars far and above previous enhanced versions we've gotten in the Sonic franchise, and hopefully will be the gold standard Sega holds itself to when it decides to bring back other Sonic games from the past."

The game also received praise from fans, and was nominated for the first round of the Players' Voice award at The Game Awards 2024.
