= Sonic Generations =

2011 video game

- Developer: Sonic Team (Note: Nintendo 3DS version developed by Dimps. Ported to Windows by Devil's Details.)
- Publisher: Sega
- Director: Hiroshi Miyamoto
- Producer: Takashi Iizuka
- Designers: Yoshinobu Uba; Daisuke Shimizu; Utako Yoshino
- Programmer: Outa Sano
- Artist: Sachiko Kawamura
- Writers: Ken Pontac (Note: The 2024 remaster features an updated script by writer Ian Flynn.); Warren Graff
- Composer: Jun Senoue
- Series: Sonic the Hedgehog
- Platforms: PlayStation 3; Xbox 360; Windows; Nintendo 3DS; Nintendo Switch; PlayStation 4; PlayStation 5; Xbox One; Xbox Series X/S; Nintendo Switch 2
- Release: November 1, 2011: PlayStation 3, Xbox 360; NA: November 1, 2011; AU: November 3, 2011; EU: November 4, 2011; JP: December 1, 2011 Windows; NA: November 4, 2011; EU: November 25, 2011 Nintendo 3DS; NA: November 22, 2011; AU: November 24, 2011; EU: November 25, 2011; JP: December 1, 2011 Sonic X Shadow Generations Nintendo Switch, PS4, PS5, Windows, Xbox One, Xbox Series X/S; WW: October 25, 2024 Nintendo Switch 2; WW: June 5, 2025
- Genre: Platform
- Modes: Single-player, multiplayer

Sonic Generations (Note: In Japan, the console version is known as Sonic Generations: White Space-time (ソニック ジェネレーションズ 白の時空), and the 3DS version is known as Sonic Generations: Blue Adventure (ソニック ジェネレーションズ 青の冒険).) is a 2011 platform game developed by Sonic Team and published by Sega for the PlayStation 3, Xbox 360, Windows, and Nintendo 3DS. Produced in commemoration of the 20th anniversary of the Sonic the Hedgehog series, the game follows Sonic and his sidekick Tails as they form an alliance with their past selves and travel through levels from previous Sonic games. It features two gameplay styles: "Classic", which plays from a side-scrolling perspective like that of the original Sega Genesis Sonic games, and "Modern", 3D levels similar to those in Sonic Unleashed (2008) and Sonic Colors (2010).

Development on Generations began following the completion of Unleashed. Sonic Team sought to re-imagine the most popular aspects of the franchise in high-definition, and developed the game using the Hedgehog Engine. Each location and many bosses in the game are previously seen in an earlier entry in the series, with the game including numerous other references to past entries. Devil's Details and Dimps helped create the Windows and 3DS versions, respectively. The Windows version is noted for its active modding scene, where a dedicated community creates new gameplay mechanics, levels, and assets for the game.

The game received positive reviews from critics and was a commercial success, selling 1.85 million copies by May 2012. Reviewers found its visuals, audio, and gameplay to be highlights, and called it a good tribute to the franchise. It also received some criticism, mostly for its occasional frame rate and control problems. Reception to the 3DS version was mixed; reviewers criticized its short length and design, and deemed it worse than Dimps' previous Sonic games. The Classic iteration of Sonic introduced in the game has continued to make appearances throughout the franchise.

A remastered edition, Sonic X Shadow Generations, (Note: Japanese: ソニック × シャドウ ジェネレーションズ, Hepburn: Sonikku × Shadō Jenerēshonzu) containing a new side game starring Shadow the Hedgehog, was released in October 2024 for the Nintendo Switch, PlayStation 4, PlayStation 5, Windows, Xbox One, and Xbox Series X/S, and as a launch title for Nintendo Switch 2 in June 2025.

== Gameplay ==

Gameplay in Chemical Plant, the game's second level. Classic Sonic's levels are played from a 2D perspective (top) while Modern Sonic's are played from a 3D perspective (bottom).

Sonic Generations is a platform game in which players control two variants of Sonic the Hedgehog: "Classic" or "Modern". Classic Sonic's gameplay is restricted side-scrolling gameplay similar to the original Sonic the Hedgehog games released in the 1990s, and requires him to use moves such as the Spin Dash and the Spin Attack. Modern Sonic's gameplay follows the gameplay style of Sonic Unleashed (2008), and Sonic Colors (2010), featuring an amalgamation of third-person and side-scrolling perspectives and techniques such as boosting and homing attacks. Both Sonics collect rings as a form of health, and power-ups such as elemental shields, invincibility, speed shoes, skateboards, or Wisps. Players can also customize each Sonic's abilities, and purchase additional ones at a Skill Shop.

The game's main hub is a realm called White Space, in which the player can explore, converse with other characters, and access the game's levels, each of which are derived from a previous entry in the series. The levels are split into three separate eras: the Genesis Era (focusing on levels from games for the Sega Genesis); the Dreamcast Era (focusing on levels from games for the Dreamcast, PlayStation 2, GameCube, and Xbox); and the Modern Era (focusing on levels from games for the PlayStation 3, Wii, Nintendo DS, and Xbox 360). Each level consists of two acts (one for each Sonic), and ten additional missions such as collecting a certain amount of rings or completing a level with the help of another character.

Upon reaching the end of the level, players are given a grade based on their performance, with an "S" rank being the best and a "D" rank the worst. After completing an era, players must defeat two bosses: a "rival" character and a main boss. Defeating each boss gives the player a Chaos Emerald, (Note: In the 3DS version, players must complete special stages to obtain Chaos Emeralds.) all seven of which must be collected to confront the final boss. In the console version, once the game has been completed, both Sonics can transform into their super forms by collecting 50 rings in a normal level. As Super Sonic, the player is invincible and their speed is greatly increased. However the Sonics lose rings while in this form, and will revert to their standard form when all the rings are gone.

Hidden around each act are five Red Star Rings. Collecting these unlocks concept art, music, or, if all five are collected, a new ability. The concept art, as well as cutscenes and character profiles, can be viewed in a Collection Room, while music can be set to play in any level, mission, or boss. The game also features two forms of online leaderboards: "Ranking Attack", which challenges players to obtain the best time and score on each level, and "30 Second Trial", which challenges players to see how far they can get through a level in 30 seconds. An emulation of the original 1991 Sonic the Hedgehog game, ported by Backbone Entertainment, can be unlocked in the PlayStation 3 and Xbox 360 versions of the game.

=== Levels ===
PS3/360/Windows levels
Stage	Original game
Green Hill	Sonic the Hedgehog (1991)
Chemical Plant	Sonic the Hedgehog 2 (1992)
Sky Sanctuary	Sonic & Knuckles (1994)
Speed Highway	Sonic Adventure (1998)
City Escape	Sonic Adventure 2 (2001)
Seaside Hill	Sonic Heroes (2003)
Crisis City	Sonic the Hedgehog (2006)
Rooftop Run	Sonic Unleashed (2008)
Planet Wisp	Sonic Colors (2010)

Nintendo 3DS levels
Stage	Original game
Green Hill	Sonic the Hedgehog (1991)
Casino Night	Sonic the Hedgehog 2 (1992)
Mushroom Hill	Sonic & Knuckles (1994)
Emerald Coast	Sonic Adventure (1998)
Radical Highway	Sonic Adventure 2 (2001)
Water Palace	Sonic Rush (2005)
Tropical Resort	Sonic Colors (2010)

=== Bosses ===
PS3/360/Windows bosses
Boss	Stage	Original game
Metal Sonic	Stardust Speedway (Bad Future)	Sonic CD (1993)
Death Egg Robot	Death Egg	Sonic the Hedgehog 2 (1992)
Shadow the Hedgehog	Final Rush	Sonic Adventure 2 (2001)
Perfect Chaos	Station Square	Sonic Adventure (1998)
Silver the Hedgehog	Crisis City	Sonic the Hedgehog (2006)
Egg Dragoon	Eggmanland	Sonic Unleashed (2008)
Time Eater	End of Time	Sonic Generations (2011)

Nintendo 3DS bosses
Boss	Stage	Original game
Metal Sonic	Casino Night	Sonic CD (1993)
Big Arm	Launch Base	Sonic the Hedgehog 3 (1994)
Shadow the Hedgehog	Radical Highway	Sonic Adventure 2 (2001)
Biolizard	Cannon's Core	Sonic Adventure 2 (2001)
Silver the Hedgehog	Tropical Resort	Sonic the Hedgehog (2006)
Egg Emperor	Final Fortress	Sonic Heroes (2003)
Time Eater	End of Time	Sonic Generations (2011)

== Plot ==
Left stranded in outer space following his previous defeat, (Note: As depicted in Sonic Colors (2010)) Doctor Eggman comes across a mysterious and time-traveling entity known as the Time Eater; realizing its potential, Eggman schemes to use the creature to alter history for his own benefit. Eventually recruiting his past ("Classic") self to his cause, the duo convert the Time Eater into a cyborg-like abomination for their plot. The creature soon proceeds to attack ("Classic") Sonic as he travels through Green Hill during the prelude to the franchise's first game and interrupts a birthday celebration being held for the present ("Modern") Sonic by his friends, scattering them all through different time portals. Modern Sonic awakens in White Space and rescues Tails after traveling through Green Hill.

Modern Sonic and Tails eventually meet their Classic counterparts and form an alliance to restore their world. The duo travel through locations from their past they find in White Space, restoring them to normal. They rescue many of their friends, including Knuckles, Amy, Rouge, Cream, Blaze and the Chaotix, while battling past enemies for the Chaos Emeralds. Both Sonics eventually confront their respective Eggmen, who overpower them using the Time Eater. However, the Sonics use the Chaos Emeralds to transform into their super forms and vanquish the Time Eater, restoring the timeline. Everyone resumes celebrating Modern Sonic's birthday while Classic Sonic and Tails bid farewell and return to their time. Meanwhile, both Classic and Modern Eggman are left trapped in White Space.

== Development ==
Green Hill Zone in Sonic the Hedgehog (1991, top) and Sonic Generations (bottom); the stage was one of the nine levels remastered in Generations

Development of Sonic Generations began after the completion of Sonic Unleashed in 2008, alongside Sonic Colors, when developer Sonic Team began discussing possible ideas for a twentieth anniversary Sonic game. The console/PC version of the game was directed by Hiroshi Miyamoto, and Yoshinobu Uba was the Lead Game Designer. Producer Takashi Iizuka wanted a game that incorporated the best of Sonic's history, and offered more replay value compared to previous games. The team eventually decided to split the gameplay into two separate playstyles: one representing the original games and another representing more recent ones. The team chose to develop on the high-definition (HD) PlayStation 3 and Xbox 360 consoles, wanting the game to re-imagine levels and aspects of previous entries with high-quality graphics. A port for Windows was also made; development was handled by Devil's Details. Dimps assisted with production of the Nintendo 3DS version. Sega considered making the 3DS version a port of the console versions, but instead chose to develop from scratch to make it unique and celebrate Sonic's portable history. A version for the Wii was planned, but was eventually abandoned due to hardware constraints. A PlayStation Portable port based on the 3DS version was also cancelled.

The game makes use of the Hedgehog Engine, the game engine Sonic Team used for developing Unleashed. To help decide which levels would appear in the game, Sega polled all their employees and conducted an internet survey about popular Sonic stages, with the levels they found most popular being the ones that were incorporated into the game. One of the main rules Sonic Team made during development was not to use older assets or level designs, and certain levels were given a new visual element to provide a new dynamic, such as the caves in Green Hill. In choosing levels for the 3DS version, the team opted to use levels from the Game Boy Advance and Nintendo DS Sonic games rather than the original Game Gear games, wanting to use levels from games of more recent memory. According to Iizuka, one of the hardest parts of developing Generations was adapting 3D levels to 2D, since their "defining" elements and themes were designed to specifically work in 3D. Recreating the "classic"-style Sonic gameplay using the Hedgehog Engine was also cited as challenging, since the engine was designed for 3D gameplay. The Spin Dash ability was also made quicker to use to help younger players unfamiliar with it. The team faced bigger difficulties developing on the 3DS; Iizuka claimed they were unfamiliar with the system's capabilities and limitations.

In contrast to the casual-oriented Colors, Sonic Generations was designed to appeal to the series' core audience. While multiple characters from throughout the franchise appear in the game, only Sonic was made playable. The script was written by Sonic Colors writers Ken Pontac and Warren Graff; according to Pontac, they both had more input in the story and cutscenes compared to Colors. Sonic Team also created a new character: the Time Eater, who serves as the game's main antagonist. The game features numerous references to past Sonic games, among these being cameo appearances by several obscure characters on posters in City Escape. Fans who attended the "Sonic Boom" or the "Summer of Sonic" fan conventions in June 2011 were able to record a birthday message that appears during the end of the game's credits sequence. Each version of the game also supports the option to play in stereoscopic 3D. According to Iizuka, he was the only one who advocated the feature, and it took trial and error before it was implemented.

=== Music ===
The musical score of Sonic Generations was primarily composed and arranged by Jun Senoue, with contributions by Richard Jacques, Naofumi Hataya, Hideki Naganuma, Kenichi Tokoi, Tomoya Ohtani, Crush 40, Circuit Freq, and Cash Cash. The soundtrack consists of remixed versions of past tracks, alongside new material written for the game. Several soundtrack albums were released alongside the game. History of the First Stage features music from the first levels of several Sonic franchise games. Sonic Generations: 20 Years of Sonic Music contains several tracks hand-picked by Sonic Team, and was sold with the collector's edition. The complete, three-volume soundtrack, Sonic Generations Original Soundtrack: Blue Blur, was released on January 11, 2012, under Sega's Wave Master label. It spans three discs and features 90 total tracks from both versions of the game.

== Release ==
Sonic Generations was first revealed in August 2009, when Sega accidentally leaked a press release including information about the game, then under the working title Sonic Anniversary. The company officially revealed the game on April 7, 2011, when they posted a teaser trailer on their Facebook page. The trailer depicted the two variants of Sonic running through Green Hill. It was initially announced for the PlayStation 3 and Xbox 360; the 3DS and Windows versions were leaked in a Sega Sammy Holdings financial earnings report. The 3DS version was confirmed in an interview with Iizuka that was published in Nintendo Power. A demo version featuring Classic Sonic's version of Green Hill was released on June 23, 2011, the twentieth anniversary of the original Sonic game's release. A second demo, featuring Modern Sonic's Green Hill, was released on October 19, 2011. Demo versions of the game were also playable at E3 2011 and the New York Comic Con.

The console versions of Sonic Generations were first released in North America on November 1, 2011, followed by a European release on November 4 and in Japan on December 1. The Windows version was released on November 3. The 3DS version was released on in North America on November 22, 2011, and in Europe on November 25, while it was released in Japan alongside the console version. The console and 3DS versions were made available for digital download in 2012. An official strategy guide for the game was published by BradyGames. In addition to the standard retail release, a collector's edition for the console version was released in Europe and Australia. It features the game and manual in limited lenticular box art in a steelbook case, a special booklet containing various Sonic artwork, a documentary disc about the history of Sonic, Sonic Generations: 20 Years of Sonic Music, a limited and individually numbered gold ring, and a figurine of both Classic and Modern Sonic striking a pose on a ring.

Sonic Generations was delisted from Steam and the Xbox Store as a standalone game on September 9, 2024, in anticipation of the then-upcoming release of Sonic X Shadow Generations. However, the game currently remains available digitally via bundles that contain multiple Sonic games, likely due to the game’s active modding community on Steam and for preservation purposes. Said mods were also unaffected.

=== Downloadable and unofficial content ===
A pinball minigame based upon Sonic the Hedgehog 2's Casino Night level was released as downloadable content for the Steam version of the game on December 26, 2011. The minigame was included in the collector's edition and offered as a pre-order incentive for the PlayStation 3 and Xbox 360 versions.

A variety of community-created modifications ("mods") have been created for the Windows version of the game. These mods add multiple gameplay changes, such as new player characters and levels. Examples include Unleashed Project, an effort to re-create Sonic Unleashed using Sonic Generations as a base; Super Mario Generations, a mod that replaces Sonic with Mario; Super Sonic Generations, which expands upon the character's super forms; Sonic Generations First Person Mod, which uses a first-person POV camera during gameplay; and SM64 Generations, which also features Mario and implements his moves and physics from Super Mario 64.

== Reception ==
Reception

Aggregate score
Aggregator	Score
Metacritic	77/100 (X360/PC); 76/100 (PS3); 66/100 (3DS)

Review scores
Publication	Score
1Up.com	B
Eurogamer	7/10
Famitsu	35/40
GameSpot	8/10
GamesRadar+	4/5 (X360/PS3/PC); 3.5/5 (3DS)
IGN	8.5/10 (X360/PS3/PC); 7/10 (3DS)
Nintendo World Report	7.5/10 (3DS)

Awards
Publication	Award
GameZone	Best Presentation
IGN	Editor's Choice

The console and PC versions of Sonic Generations received "generally favorable reviews", according to review aggregator Metacritic. The game was also successful commercially, selling 1.85 million copies worldwide across all platforms by March 31, 2012.

The game's presentation was well received. Nathan Meunier of GameSpot called the graphics arguably the best of the series, praising the detail put into recreating each level; this statement was echoed by Tim Turi of Game Informer. Jack DeVries and Brian Altano of IGN offered similar praise for the visuals, and described its remixed tracks as "cool" and its sound effects as "spot on". Tom Bramwell of Eurogamer felt Sonic Generations was a worthy tribute to the Sonic franchise, though he still considered the franchise's previous entry, Sonic Colors, to be better.

The gameplay was also positively received; critics praised its level design and replay value. Bob Mackey of 1UP.com appreciated the variation between each level and their challenges and letting the player choose the levels they would like to play. DeVries and Altano considered the "classic"-style gameplay to be a successful revival of the 1990s Sonic games and the "modern"-style to be similarly enjoyable, though they offered minor criticism of the former's floaty physics and the latter's reliance on speed. Justin Towell of GamesRadar praised the level design to be among the best, claiming the Chemical Plant level gets "more fun with every play". Bramwell found the 3D levels surprisingly enjoyable. Famitsu favorably compared the sense of speed to that of racing games and praised the "nimble" camerawork, describing the overall experience as addictive.

Some aspects of the game were criticized, however. Mackey criticized its occasional framerate issues and on-rails sections. Bramwell felt that Generations still suffered from problems present in prior games, and found its controls laggy and criticized certain segments requiring split-second precision. DeVries and Altano found the boss fights to be limited and weak, wishing the game had the special stages seen in previous games. Empire considered the game's weak storyline to be its only problem. Famitsu wrote that the game as a whole successfully delivered the series' traditional high speed and exhilaration. DeVries and Altano determined that Sonic Generations was accessible to everyone and gave it an Editor's Choice Award. Meunier felt that the game combined the best elements of old and new Sonic games well, and concluded that "Sonic Generations doesn't skimp on the speed or the fun".

=== 3DS version ===
In contrast to the console and PC versions, reviews for the 3DS version were "mixed or average", according to Metacritic, with Jack Devries of IGN stating that "for the first time in a decade, the handheld Sonic is not the best". Several reviewers pointed out the fact that there are little difference between the gameplay of classic and modern Sonic, since both are limited to 2D movement. James Newton of Nintendo Life described it as "short and unambitious" and compared it unfavorably to the then-recently released Super Mario 3D Land. Dan Whitehead of Eurogamer agreed, criticizing the handheld game's lack of variety, replay value, and inconsistent design and calling its levels "a pain to explore", though he offered praise for its visuals and recreations of classic Sonic moments. Both DeVries and Turi considered the 3DS version to be a rushed tie-in with the console version, and agreed that, while not a bad game, it was below the standard of Dimps' previous Sonic games.

== Legacy ==
In 2017, GamesRadar named Sonic Generations the seventh best game of the Sonic series, and USgamer named it the tenth best. Following the reemergence of "Classic" Sonic, Sega would later begin to include him in other modern Sonic games, such as Sonic Dash (2013) and Sonic Runners (2015). The 2017 game Sonic Forces follows a similar premise to Generations, featuring both Classic and Modern iterations of Sonic as playable characters, and also uses an updated version of Generations' game engine. Some journalists initially believed Forces was a sequel to Generations, but Iizuka later clarified that it was a separate game.

Years after its release, the game has remained as a strong seller for Sega. On April 10, 2018, the Xbox 360 version was made backward compatible with the Xbox One, and was later extended to the Xbox Series X/S. An update to the Xbox 360 version in November 2021 added support for 4K visuals and an increased frame rate when played on Series X/S. Footage and music from Generations was used in the Sonic the Hedgehog pinball machine, released by Jersey Jack Pinball in 2026.

=== Remaster ===
During a PlayStation State of Play livestream on January 31, 2024, Sega announced Sonic X Shadow Generations, a bundle containing a remaster of Generations and a Shadow the Hedgehog-centric side game, Shadow Generations, the story of which occurs parallel to the events of Generations. The remaster includes the Casino Night pinball DLC and features additional content, such as hidden Chao to rescue in each stage and the addition of the Drop Dash ability first seen in Sonic Mania. The game's script was also updated and re-recorded for the remaster.

Sonic X Shadow Generations was released for the Nintendo Switch, PlayStation 4, PlayStation 5, Xbox One, Xbox Series X/S, and Windows on October 25, 2024. Players who preordered the game received a Modern Sonic skin based on Sonic's 3D model from Sonic Adventure, while players could obtain a Classic Sonic skin based on Sonic's 3D model in Sonic Jam by subscribing to a newsletter; both skins have since been publicly released as free DLC. A port for Nintendo Switch 2 was released as a launch title for the system on June 5, 2025.
