= Green Hill Zone =

First level in Sonic the Hedgehog

- Sonic the Hedgehog location
- Green Hill Zone as it appears in the original Sonic the Hedgehog
- First appearance: Sonic the Hedgehog (1991)
- Created by: Naoto Ohshima, Jina Ishiwatari, Hirokazu Yasuhara
- Genre: Platform
- Characters: Sonic the Hedgehog, Doctor Eggman

Green Hill Zone (Note: Japanese: グリーンヒルゾーン, Hepburn: Gurīn Hiru Zōn), also known as Green Hill, (Note: Japanese: グリーンヒル, Hepburn: Gurīn Hiru) is the first level of the platform game Sonic the Hedgehog, which released for the Sega Genesis in 1991. The level is grassy and lush, with environmental features such as waterfall vistas, and palm trees, vertical loops and cliffs, and is the home of numerous forest animals. Like the game's other levels, Green Hill Zone comprises three acts; in the third, Sonic fights antagonist Doctor Eggman before moving to the second level, Marble Zone. It was constructed by level designer Hirokazu Yasuhara with its musical theme by Masato Nakamura.

Green Hill Zone is considered to be a classic video game level, akin to the first stage of Super Mario Bros., World 1-1. The level and its music have also received positive opinions from critics. It has appeared in other games in the series, such as Sonic Adventure 2, Sonic Generations, Sonic Mania, Sonic Forces, and Sonic Frontiers. Critics have noted a Green Hill Zone-like aesthetic in levels of other games.

== Description ==
Green Hill Zone is the first level of Sonic the Hedgehog. Located on South Island, it is a lush, grassy stage with unique features like droopy palm trees and crumbling cliffs. In addition, as with later levels in the game, Green Hill Zone has environmental features and obstacles like ramps, vertical loops, tunnels, spring-boards, spikes, and checkpoints. It is normally populated by woodland creatures, but antagonist Doctor Eggman imprisons them inside robots known as Badniks prior to the events of the game, so the player must destroy them to free the animals. Green Hill Zone consists of three acts, and the end of Act 3 features a boss battle with Robotnik. After beating Robotnik, Sonic moves on to the second level, the lava-themed Marble Zone.

== Development ==
"Green Hill Zone Theme"
A 24-second portion of the theme for Green Hill Zone, composed by Masato Nakamura.

Sonic the Hedgehog was created by the newly formed Sonic Team, a 15-member Sega subsidiary formed to create a character that could compete with Nintendo's Mario. The game's level design was handled by Hirokazu Yasuhara, and the musical theme was composed by Masato Nakamura, bassist from the J-pop band Dreams Come True. In designing Green Hill Zone, Yasuhara was inspired by the U.S. state of California, while the game's color scheme in general was influenced by the work of pop artist Eizin Suzuki.

The game's programmer, Yuji Naka, stated that it took him almost a year to create Green Hill Zone and that it was created and destroyed multiple times before arriving at the final version.

== Appearances ==
Green Hill Zone as it appears in 3D ("Modern") form in Sonic Generations

While the original game was a 2D side-scroller, Green Hill Zone was taken and remade in full 3D as a secret level in the 2001 game Sonic Adventure 2; the player unlocks it after collecting all 180 of the emblems found by completing the game's many objectives. The 2011 game Sonic Generations, a title that revisits past entries in the Sonic series, features both 2D ("Classic") and 3D ("Modern") versions of Green Hill Zone, as well as of numerous other Sonic levels. A reinterpretation of the level appears in the 2017 title Sonic Mania. Green Hill Zone reappears in Sonic Forces, having partially turned to desert due to resource depletion by Eggman's industries. Digital recreations of Green Hill Zone appear in the 2022 game Sonic Frontiers as part of the game's Cyber Space levels.

In addition, Green Hill Zone appears as a stage in the 2.5D fighting game Sonic Battle, in the tennis video game Sega Superstars Tennis, in the sports video game Mario & Sonic at the Sochi 2014 Olympic Winter Games, in the mobile title Sonic Dash, in the crossover adventure game Lego Dimensions, the crossover multiplayer shooter Fortnite Battle Royale, and in the crossover fighting games Dengeki Bunko: Fighting Climax and the Super Smash Bros. series. In the 2020 live-action film adaptation Sonic the Hedgehog, Green Hill Zone is depicted as Sonic's original home. The film series also features Sonic and friends living in a small town in Montana named Green Hills.

== Merchandise ==
A Lego Ideas set based on the level was released on January 1, 2022. It received mixed reception from Alice Clarke of Kotaku, who called it "not the most thrilling build", remarking that its price was high, but that Sonic fans would love it.

== Reception ==
Green Hill Zone has been recognized by critics as a classic, well-known video game level. It has been described as "classic" by Samit Sarkar of Polygon and by James Stephanie Sterling and Chris Carter of Destructoid. Comparably, Joe Skrebels of Official Nintendo Magazine called it "nostalgic", while Christopher Grant from Joystiq considered it to have a place "in the center of your retro-gaming shrine". Kevin Wong of Complex stated that the game's and level's popularity were such that "even if you didn't have a Genesis, this was the level you played at the department store while your parents went shopping." Craig Snyder at MakeUseOf named the level as one of the five best levels in video games, calling it "a great way to prepare for what’s to come".

The level's background music was particularly noted as memorable. Andy Kelly from Computer and Video Games called the Green Hill theme a "monumental slice of Sega nostalgia", and GamesRadar writer Justin Towell also referred to it as classic. Game Informer's Tim Turi found the level's music "catchy", and Wong ranked it as the thirteenth greatest piece of gaming music from the 16-bit era.

== Legacy ==
Later Sonic games often included callbacks to Green Hill Zone. Turi noted that Emerald Hill Zone from Sonic the Hedgehog 2, Mushroom Hill Zone from Sonic & Knuckles, and Seaside Hill Zone from Sonic Heroes all fit the same general mold as Green Hill Zone, claiming that "gamers have played Green Hill Zone dozens of times." However, he opined that the Sonic Generations version of the original Green Hill Zone "trounces them all" in both its 2D and 3D incarnations. Justin Baker of Nintendo World Report and Skrebels both analogized Windy Hill Zone from Sonic Lost World to Green Hill Zone, while Carter thought similarly of The Legend of Zelda downloadable content levels. The decision to include Green Hill Zone in other games in the series, such as Sonic Forces, has been a source of debate among some fans, who believe that Sega has overused the stage since its debut.

The version of Green Hill Zone featured in Sonic Mania became one of that game's most "hotly contested" speedrun courses due to its added complexity in comparison to the original. The fastest route through the level was noted as constantly shifting between the top, middle, or bottom segments as speedrunners further optimized the path. Trihex, a notable speedrunner, called the level "a monster" due to its difficulty, including timed platforms.

To mark Sonic's fifteenth anniversary in 2006, Sega released a papercraft version of Green Hill Zone as a PDF on its website. In 2011, not long after the release of Sonic Generations, Sega held a contest inviting gamers to upload YouTube video playthroughs of the game's 3D version of Green Hill Zone completed in less than one minute and fifty seconds; winners were eligible for Sonic merchandise.

During the 30th anniversary of Sonic, Nakamura and Dreams Come True released "Tsugi no Se~no! De - On The Green Hill - DCT version", a single of the Green Hill Zone theme which introduced lyrics to the theme for the first time was released on July 7, 2021. A music video followed just a few months after the single's release in September of that year. An alternate version of the track with more Genesis/Megadrive sounding instruments was released sometime after the single and was titled the "Masado & Miwasco version".

== See also ==
- Level design
