= Shadow the Hedgehog =

Video game character

- Sonic the Hedgehog character
- Artwork for Sonic Adventure 2 (2001) by Yuji Uekawa
- First game: Sonic Adventure 2 (2001)
- Created by: Takashi Iizuka; Shiro Maekawa
- Designed by: Kazuyuki Hoshino
- Voiced by: Japanese: Kōji Yusa (2001–present); Toshiyuki Morikawa (live-action franchise); English: David Humphrey (2001–2004); Ryan Drummond (2001; additional lines in Sonic Adventure 2); Jason Griffith (2004–2010); Kirk Thornton (2010–present); Ian Hanlin (Sonic Prime); Keanu Reeves (live-action franchise)

In-universe information
- Species: Hedgehog/Black Arms
- Gender: Male
- Title: The Ultimate Lifeform
- Origin: Space Colony ARK

Shadow the Hedgehog (Note: Japanese: シャドウ・ザ・ヘッジホッグ, Hepburn: Shadō za Hejjihoggu) is a character created by the Japanese game developers Takashi Iizuka, Shiro Maekawa, and Kazuyuki Hoshino. He is a major character in Sega's Sonic the Hedgehog franchise. Shadow is an anthropomorphic black hedgehog created by Professor Gerald Robotnik, the grandfather of Doctor Eggman. Shadow shares design traits and attributes with Sonic the Hedgehog. He is an antihero who has good intentions but will do whatever it takes to accomplish his goals, putting him at odds with Sonic.

Shadow first appeared in the Dreamcast game Sonic Adventure 2 (2001), although he was conceived during the development of Sonic Adventure (1998). Iizuka devised the concept, while Maekawa developed his character and Hoshino designed him. Influences included the Dragon Ball character Vegeta, the Image Comics character Spawn, the Sonic character Metal Sonic, and speed skaters. Sonic Team envisioned Shadow as a one-off character who would only appear in Sonic Adventure 2, but his popularity among fans led to his inclusion in subsequent games, beginning with Sonic Heroes (2003).

Shadow has featured in many Sonic games, including the standalone games Shadow the Hedgehog (2005) and Shadow Generations (2024). Shadow is one of the few Sonic characters to have a full character arc; after witnessing the death of his best friend Maria Robotnik, he initially seeks revenge, but later vows to keep his promise to her that he would protect the world from danger. Kōji Yusa voices Shadow in Japan, while his English voice has been provided by David Humphrey, Jason Griffith, and Kirk Thornton. Keanu Reeves voices him in the feature film Sonic the Hedgehog 3 (2024).

Shadow is one of the most popular Sonic characters and was named one of the greatest video game characters by Guinness World Records in 2011. However, he has proven divisive among video game journalists. Some praised his role in Sonic Adventure 2, his levels' preservation of the Sonic theme, and his portrayal in the Sonic 3 film, but others criticized his dark and brooding characterization, particularly in later games, and ranked him among the worst Sonic characters. The Shadow the Hedgehog game received generally unfavorable reviews, though it sold well.

== Character ==
Shadow is an anthropomorphic black hedgehog appearing in Sega's Sonic the Hedgehog series of platform games and its various spin-offs. He first appeared in the 2001 installment Sonic Adventure 2, the final Sonic game released for a Sega video game console. His roles in the games vary. Some, such as the main series games Sonic Adventure 2, Sonic Heroes (2003), and Sonic the Hedgehog (2006) feature him as a major playable character, and he is the protagonist of the spin-off Shadow the Hedgehog (2005) and a downloadable content (DLC) package for Sonic Forces (2017). Shadow also appears as an unlockable playable character in Sonic Dream Team, after an update in 2024 to commemorate the Year of Shadow campaign. Others, such as the anniversary game Sonic Generations (2011), limit him to a non-playable role. He also appears as one of the characters who can be summoned using the Assist Trophy item in the Super Smash Bros. series. He also appears as a character cosmetic outfit in Fortnite Battle Royale.

Shadow is a mysterious, sharp-witted, and brooding antihero. While his ultimate goal is to protect the world from danger, he dislikes humanity, and once he has set a goal, he does whatever it takes to accomplish it. This often causes him to take risks without thinking them through and puts him at odds with series protagonist Sonic the Hedgehog. Although a loner, Shadow collaborates with treasure hunter Rouge the Bat and robot E-123 Omega in games such as Sonic Heroes, Sonic the Hedgehog (2006), and Sonic Forces. Shadow allies with Sonic in some games, but also does so with Doctor Eggman in Sonic Adventure 2 and Shadow the Hedgehog.

Shadow shares many similarities with Sonic. Visually, GameSpot's Ben Stahl described Shadow as "an evil version of Sonic himself—similar in appearance, but with darker skin, more angled eyes, and a fearsome snarl instead of Sonic's trademark grin." Justin Leeper of GamesRadar+ said that if Sonic were Superman, then Shadow would be his Batman. The characters control similarly in games, as both share skills and the ability to run at great speeds. Shadow has unique attributes in some games, such as his uses of firearms and vehicles in Shadow the Hedgehog and Sonic the Hedgehog, respectively. He can also use the Chaos Emeralds to perform "Chaos Control"—allowing him to distort time—and create weapons like spears. Like Sonic, Shadow can transform into a "Super" form, giving him special powers. In Shadow Generations, he is given a new form known as "Doom Wings Shadow," where he sprouts wings and can fly across the stage with invincibility until losing rings in a similar manner to Super Sonic.

=== Other media ===
Outside of the video game series, Shadow appears in the anime series Sonic X (2003–2006), which adapts the story of the Sonic Adventure games, as well as Sonic Boom and Sonic Prime. The original Japanese cast from the games reprised their roles for the former, while Jason Griffith (who also voiced Sonic) voiced Shadow in its English dub by 4Kids Entertainment. In the Sonic Boom (2014–2017) spin-off franchise, Shadow appears in the 2014 games Sonic Boom: Rise of Lyric for the Wii U and Sonic Boom: Shattered Crystal for the Nintendo 3DS, as well as the television episodes "It Takes a Village to Defeat a Hedgehog" and "Eggman: The Video Game", voiced by Kirk Thornton (who also voiced Orbot).

Ian Hanlin voices Shadow in the animated Netflix series Sonic Prime (2022–2024). After Sonic inadvertently opens the path to the Paradox Prism for Eggman, Shadow has a vague vision of the universe's shatter and tries to prevent it but fails, he manages to escape it using Chaos Control and is trapped in the void between Shatterspaces.

Shadow also appears in the Sonic the Hedgehog comic books published by Archie Comics and IDW Publishing. Shadow had 2 story arcs in the Archie Sonic spinoff line titled Sonic Universe, The Shadow Saga and Shadow Fall, the latter of which served as a spiritual successor to his solo game from 2005. Shadow's likeness has been used in Sonic merchandise. Shadow made his live-action debut in a non-speaking cameo appearance in the mid-credits scene of the 2022 film Sonic the Hedgehog 2, and was voiced by Keanu Reeves in the sequel Sonic the Hedgehog 3, released on December 20, 2024.

== Development ==
Early concept art of Shadow the Hedgehog by Kazuyuki Hoshino, c. 2000

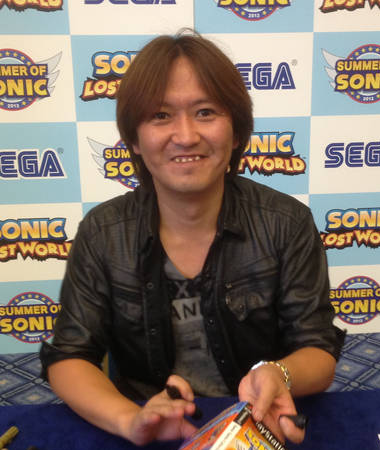
Takashi Iizuka, Shadow's co-creator, in 2013

Shadow was created by Takashi Iizuka and Shiro Maekawa, who respectively served as director and writer of Sonic Adventure 2. During the development of the original Sonic Adventure (1998), Sonic Team conceived a black hedgehog who equaled or exceeded Sonic's coolness. The idea was revived during brainstorming sessions for Sonic Adventure 2, as the game features two "good vs. evil" storylines. Iizuka wanted to appeal to American audiences with an antihero, a popular character archetype in the US at the time. Concept art indicates that Shadow was primarily inspired by the Dragon Ball character Vegeta, but Iizuka denied this, instead citing the Image Comics character Spawn as an influence.

Shadow was initially named "Terios" ("reflection of"), referencing his role as Sonic's doppelganger. He was renamed Shadow after another new character, a bat, who became Rouge. Sonic Team tasked Maekawa with developing Shadow, a task he found challenging. One night, while he brainstormed lines for a scene in which Sonic confronts Shadow for impersonating him, Maekawa came up with Shadow's first line: "Hmph, aren't you the fake one here?" From here, Maekawa envisioned the hedgehog as a delicate, pure character who would refer to himself using the more humble Japanese pronoun boku (僕). Iizuka made sure that Shadow's introduction also brought new events to the game, as he wanted players to care about the character.

Kazuyuki Hoshino designed Shadow. Like he had when he designed Metal Sonic for Sonic CD (1993), Hoshino imagined Shadow in a confrontation with Sonic to produce the design. Early Shadow designs bore a strong resemblance to Sonic, with darker colors, droopier spines, and a scar on the left of his face. Hoshino said these designs reflected Shadow being originally "more obviously evil"; he called the initial incarnation "Terios the Prisoner". For the final design, Hoshino remembered that he had designed Metal Sonic with a jet engine to distinguish him from Sonic. Likewise, he drew inspiration from speed skaters for Shadow's design since he wanted Shadow to rival Sonic's speed in a unique manner. The red stripes featured in Shadow's design was inspired by traditional kabuki makeup.

Sonic Adventure 2 was intended to be Shadow's only appearance, but his popularity among fans led to him returning in Sonic Heroes. Additionally, Sonic Team wanted to feature Shadow in a spin-off game. By 2005, Sonic Team was interested in developing a high-speed shooter game. They chose to focus on Shadow—whom they felt would provide "the perfect venue... to try our hand at this genre"—leading to the development of Shadow the Hedgehog. Series co-creator Yuji Naka hoped Shadow would lead to a spin-off series. When developing Shadow's design and world, Sonic Team was influenced by films such as Underworld (2003), Constantine (2005), and the Terminator series.

The team abandoned Shadow's shooting gameplay when working on Sonic the Hedgehog in 2006. Instead, director Shun Nakamura emphasized combat to differentiate his gameplay from that of Sonic's; while Sonic was designed for speedy platforming, Shadow was designed for fighting enemies. After Sonic and the Black Knight (2009), Shadow did not appear as a playable character in a Sonic platformer for some time, until the release of Sonic Forces in 2017. Nakamura explained that Sonic Team brought Shadow back for Sonic Forces so it would appeal to fans of the Adventure games, as the character is "extremely popular" among that group. Iizuka has commented that another Shadow-oriented spin-off is a possibility.

=== Voice portrayal ===
In Japan, Kōji Yusa voices Shadow, except in the Japanese dub of the film, Sonic the Hedgehog 3, where Toshizuki Morikawa voices the character. Shadow's English voice actor has changed several times. David Humphrey was the first to assume the role, with Ryan Drummond filling in for a few lines in the Finalhazard boss level in Sonic Adventure 2. Humphrey was replaced by Jason Griffith, who voiced Shadow and Sonic in the English dub of the anime series Sonic X (2003–2006), and in video games beginning with Shadow the Hedgehog in 2005. Kirk Thornton has voiced Shadow since 2010, starting with Sonic Free Riders. In Sonic Prime, Shadow is voiced by Ian Hanlin. Canadian actor Keanu Reeves voices Shadow in the 2024 film Sonic the Hedgehog 3, and reprised his role in downloadable content for Sonic X Shadow Generations.

== Character biography ==
Within the Sonic series' fictional universe, Shadow the Hedgehog was created by Professor Gerald Robotnik through genetic engineering. In Shadow the Hedgehog, it is later revealed that Gerald made a deal with the alien Black Doom to use his blood in order to create the Ultimate Lifeform, but in exchange, Shadow would need to gather all 7 Chaos Emeralds and give them to the Black Arms. His creation was part of an experiment, "Project Shadow", meant to cure his granddaughter Maria from a deadly illness. While Shadow and Maria formed a strong bond, the United Federation government and a military organization, the Guardian Units of Nations (GUN), deemed him a threat. GUN raided the Space Colony ARK on which Maria and Shadow lived, killing the former as she sent Shadow to Earth in an escape pod. Shadow was later recovered by GUN and placed in suspended animation. Maria's death traumatized Shadow, who vowed to keep his promise to her that he would protect the world from danger. In Sonic Adventure 2, Gerald's grandson, Doctor Eggman, learns of Shadow and revives him as part of a plan to conquer the world and defeat Sonic the Hedgehog. Believing that the promise he made was one of revenge on humanity, Shadow agrees to help Eggman, framing Sonic for their evil deeds. However, Shadow eventually allies himself with Sonic to prevent the world's destruction after he remembers the promise he made to Maria. However, he is unable to handle the power of all seven Chaos Emeralds in a Super State as well as Sonic, plummeting to Earth from space after the final boss fight.

Shadow is presumed dead until Sonic Heroes; Rouge the Bat discovers him alive in an Eggman base during a search. He remembers nothing except his name and Maria's death, forming "Team Dark" with Rouge and E-123 Omega to find Eggman and learn of his past. In Shadow the Hedgehog, Shadow, still experiencing amnesia, becomes caught in a three-way war between Eggman, GUN, and the Black Arms, an alien army led by Black Doom. Shadow can choose to help GUN, Sonic and his friends, Eggman, or the Black Arms. At the end of the game, Shadow recovers from his amnesia and learns the truth about his past, including that Gerald created him using Black Doom's DNA. Black Doom uses that in an attempt control him, but Shadow stands up to him and ultimately defeats him. After the battle, Shadow chooses to put the past behind him and move on, and in Sonic the Hedgehog is depicted as working with GUN. In Shadow Generations, Shadow, believing the Black Arms have resurfaced, returns to the ARK, where he is thrust into the dimension of White Space by the Time Eater (concurrently during the events of Sonic Generations). Along his journey, he manifests mysterious Doom Powers, which he uses to fight against Black Doom; Shadow also encounters Gerald and Maria, taken from another point in time, who assist in helping Shadow control his new powers as he confronts and destroys Black Doom once and for all. Upon his triumph, Maria and Gerald return to their time period as Shadow joins Rouge to help Sonic against the Time Eater.

== Reception and legacy ==
Shadow quickly proved popular among players of Sonic Adventure 2, contributing to his return in later games. Additionally, responses to his introduction were favorable; critics considered his levels in Sonic Adventure 2 among the game's highlights. GameSpot's Shane Satterfield wrote Shadow's levels were exciting and helped preserve the general theme of Sonic games, and wished they had been more plentiful. Nintendo Life's Mark Reece similarly felt Shadow's levels successfully adapted the Sonic formula to 3D. However, despite strong sales, the 2005 Shadow game received generally unfavorable reviews and, according to Official Nintendo Magazine's Thomas East, tarnished the character's reputation.

Reviews for Shadow the Hedgehog criticized numerous aspects of the character, such as his controls, use of firearms, and characterization. Game Informer's Matt Helgeson decried Shadow as a character who lacked personality and mocked his "ridiculous" and "laughable" Clint Eastwood rasp, while GameSpy's Patrick Klepek felt the game was proof the Sonic series had jumped the shark. Similarly, 1UP.com's Shane Bettenhausen compared Shadow to Poochie, a character from The Simpsons episode "The Itchy & Scratchy & Poochie Show" (1997) symbolic of creating a new character simply to boost a flagging series. Klepek thought guns made sense for Shadow's character but did not have a compelling use in the game, and expressed hope Sonic Team would "[bury] him alongside the same graves as the third-tier of characters from Knuckles' Chaotix." Critics reviewing the 2006 Sonic the Hedgehog considered Shadow's gameplay slightly better than that of Sonic's but felt it did not add enough to the experience, while Den of Geek's Chris Freiberg wrote that the Shadow DLC for Sonic Forces added some replay value to a game he criticized for its short length.

Reviewers have called Shadow—both the game and the character—an ill-advised attempt to bring a sense of maturity to the Sonic series. Indeed, IGN's Levi Buchanan and 1UP's Jeremy Parish considered him one of the series' biggest problems; Parish wrote that of the unnecessary Sonic characters Sega should retire, Shadow was the most in need of it. Numerous video game journalists have mockingly described the character as "edgy", internet slang referring to someone who exhibits disconcerting behavior in an effort to impress others. The character has also been the subject of several internet memes, such as one claiming the character loves Latinas, which was acknowledged in Sonic the Hedgehog 3.

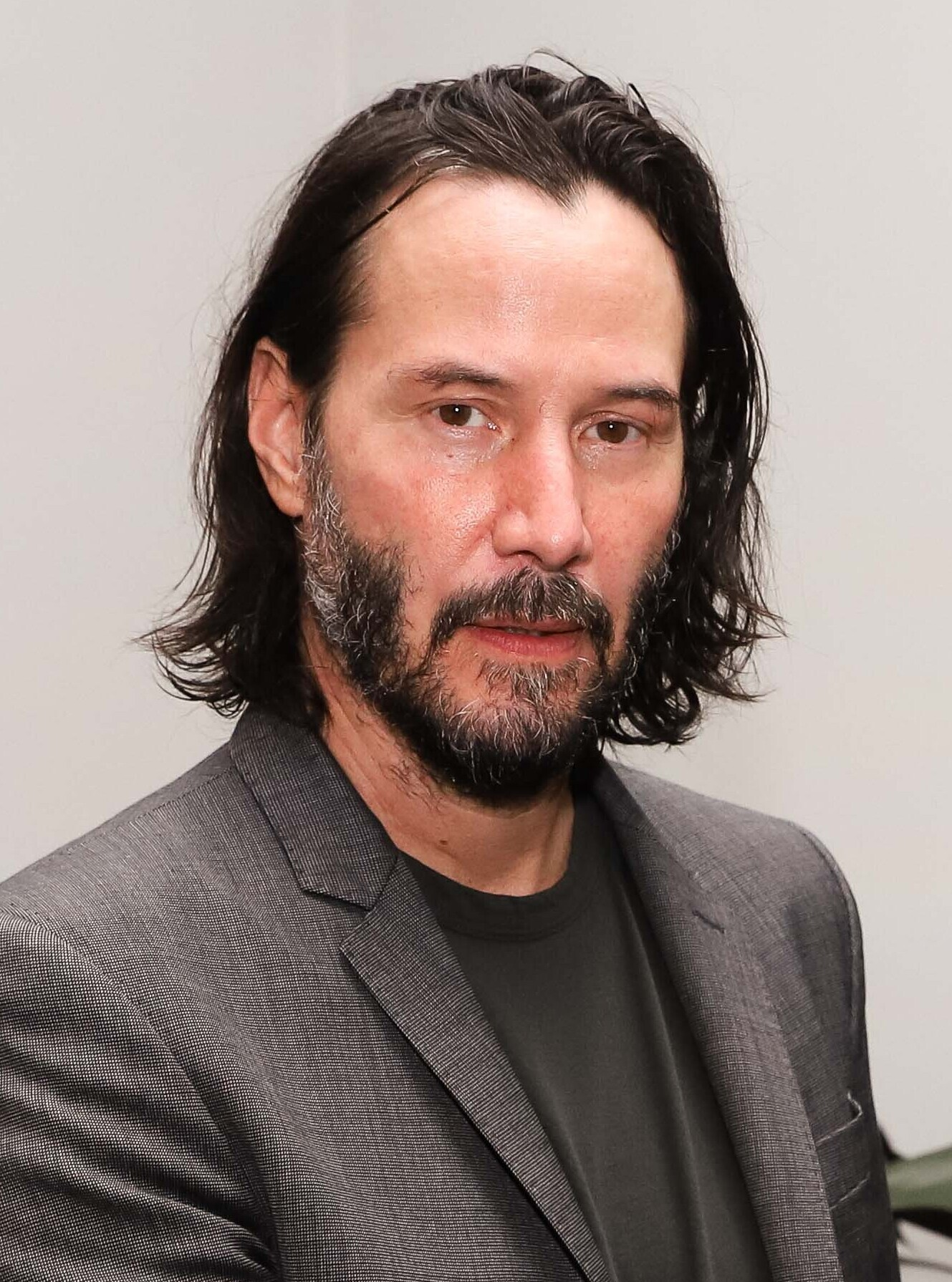
Actor Keanu Reeves (pictured) voices Shadow in the live-action film series, an adaptation of the character that earned critical praise.

Shadow is a divisive Sonic character. Some, such as East, who ranked him one of the series' best characters, praise him for his role in Sonic Adventure 2; Game Informer's Brian Shea called Shadow a "fun equal" to Sonic who delivered the series' traditional sense of speed, and Polygon's Allegra Frank said he is a fan-favorite. "For others," wrote Kotaku's Mike Fahey, Shadow "signifies the looming death of a beloved series." Fahey felt Shadow's self-titled game was when the Sonic franchise lost its identity, and dismissed those who argued in favor of his role in Sonic Adventure 2. James Stephanie Sterling, writing for GamesRadar+, ranked Shadow among the series' worst characters, arguing he lost his relevance over time and calling him "the ultimate example of a good idea gone rotten." Brian Shea from Game Informer included Shadow in a similar list, observing that his "brooding 'tortured soul' personality wore on him quickly". In a more positive write-up, Fanbyte's Kenneth Shepard argued Shadow's characterization was more complex than most characters in the series, but later games leaned harder on a one-dimensional "edgelord" archetype. Despite this, in 2005 Naka said Sonic Team had determined Shadow was the series' most popular character excluding Sonic himself, a finding reaffirmed in a 2009 Sega poll and 2025 Dengeki Online poll. In 2011, Guinness World Records named Shadow among the 50 greatest video game characters of all time.

In the film adaptation Sonic the Hedgehog 3 (2024), Shadow and his voice actor Keanu Reeves's portrayal received critical praise. Variety's Owen Gleiberman said that Reeves's "tones of deepest resonance" made Shadow empathetic to the audience, The New York Times's Glenn Kenny felt Reeves brought "suitable emo brooding" to Shadow, and The A.V. Club's Matt Donato wrote Reeves added "stoic somberness" to the established cast. The Hollywood Reporter said that Reeves brought the same gravitas to Shadow that he did to John Wick, feeling his delivery of "quiet condescension" made him "all the scarier for the lack of overt menace". Polygon contrasted Eggman actor Jim Carrey's "gloriously deranged" performance with the "utter sincerity" of Reeves, who they praised for making Shadow a "weirdly likable little ball of pain". IGN's Matt Donato said that Reeves's own identity, which was already reflected in the character by his voice, "profound[ly]" paralleled the tragedy in Shadow's story considering Reeves had experienced "unthinkable" hardships in his life; Donato concluded that Reeves "is Shadow the Hedgehog".

In April 2024, Sega launched the marketing campaign Fearless: Year of Shadow, with several projects starring Shadow the Hedgehog, such as Sonic X Shadow Generations and the film Sonic the Hedgehog 3. Since this campaign, Shadow has seen a resurgence in popularity among the Sonic fan base and general audiences. Iizuka said Shadow was his favorite Sonic character.
