= Sonic Adventure =

1998 video game

- Dreamcast cover art by Yuji Uekawa
- Developer: Sonic Team
- Publisher: Sega
- Director: Takashi Iizuka
- Producer: Yuji Naka
- Designers: Takao Miyoshi; Takashi Iizuka; Yojiro Ogawa
- Programmers: Tetsu Katano; Yoshitaka Kawabata
- Artists: Kazuyuki Hoshino; Yuji Uekawa
- Writer: Akinori Nishiyama
- Composers: Jun Senoue; Kenichi Tokoi; Fumie Kumatani
- Series: Sonic the Hedgehog
- Platforms: Dreamcast; GameCube; Windows; Xbox 360; PlayStation 3
- Release: December 23, 1998: Dreamcast; JP: December 23, 1998; NA: September 9, 1999; EU: October 14, 1999 GameCube; NA: June 17, 2003; JP: June 19, 2003; AU: June 20, 2003; EU: June 27, 2003 Windows; JP: December 18, 2003; PAL: February 6, 2004; NA: September 14, 2004 Xbox 360; NA: September 15, 2010; EU: September 21, 2010; JP: September 25, 2010 PlayStation 3; NA: September 20, 2010; EU: September 21, 2010; JP: September 29, 2010
- Genres: Platform, action-adventure
- Mode: Single-player

Sonic Adventure (Note: Japanese: ソニックアドベンチャー, Hepburn: Sonikku Adobenchā) is a 1998 platform game developed by Sonic Team and published by Sega for the Dreamcast. It was the first main Sonic the Hedgehog game to feature 3D gameplay. It follows Sonic the Hedgehog, Miles "Tails" Prower, Knuckles the Echidna, Amy Rose, Big the Cat, and E-102 Gamma in their quests to collect the Chaos Emeralds and stop Doctor Ivo Robotnik from unleashing Chaos, an ancient evil. Controlling one of the six characters—each with their own abilities—players complete levels to progress the story. Sonic Adventure retains many elements from prior Sonic games, such as power-ups and the ring-based health system. Players can play minigames such as racing and interact with Chao, a virtual pet.

Sonic Team began developing Sonic Adventure in 1997, after the cancellation of the Sega Saturn game Sonic X-treme. Led by director Takashi Iizuka and producer Yuji Naka, the team strove to reinvent Sonic for the 3D era of video games. Adventure features a stronger emphasis on storytelling and role-playing elements in contrast to previous Sonic games, while Yuji Uekawa redesigned the series's characters for their transition to 3D. Sonic Team attempted to demonstrate the technical prowess of the Dreamcast with realistic graphics and drew inspiration from locations in Peru and Guatemala. The soundtrack was primarily composed by Jun Senoue, who preferred rock music over the electropop of previous Sonic games.

Following its reveal at the Tokyo International Forum in August 1998, Sonic Adventure was highly anticipated and was released in Japan in December 1998, North America in September 1999, and Europe in October 1999. It received acclaim and became the Dreamcast's bestseller, with 2.5 million copies sold by August 2006. Reviewers considered Adventure a major technical advancement and praised the visuals and gameplay. Though critics noted glitches and camera problems, and reactions to the audio were mixed, they considered Sonic Adventure exceptional; some speculated that it could help re-establish Sega as the dominant console manufacturer after the unsuccessful Saturn.

Journalists have retrospectively ranked Sonic Adventure among the best Sonic games, and it is recognized as an important release in both the series and the platform genre. Many characters and concepts introduced in Adventure recur in later Sonic games. Sonic Adventure 2 was released in 2001. Adventure was ported to the GameCube and Windows in 2003 with modernized visuals, more challenges and additional content, while a high-definition version was released for the Xbox 360 and PlayStation 3 in 2010 and for Windows in 2011. Reviews for these releases were less positive; critics felt the game had not aged well and ran at an inconsistent frame rate.

== Gameplay ==
Gameplay screenshot showing Sonic in one of the game's levels, Speed Highway

Sonic Adventure is a 3D platform game with action and role-playing elements. Players control one of six anthropomorphic protagonists as they venture to defeat Doctor Robotnik and his robot army, who seeks the seven Chaos Emeralds and the entity Chaos. Six player characters are unlocked as the game progresses, each with their own story and attributes. Sonic the Hedgehog performs a spin dash, homing attack, and light-speed dash; Miles "Tails" Prower flies, swims, and attacks robots using his tails; Knuckles the Echidna glides, climbs walls, and punches; Amy Rose can defeat enemies using her hammer; Big the Cat is slow and carries a fishing rod he can cast; and E-102 Gamma can shoot laser beams.

At the start of the game, the player is placed in one of three Adventure Fields, open-ended hub worlds inhabited by advice-giving NPCs. The player is guided and instructed by the voice of Tikal the Echidna. Through exploration, the player discovers entrances to levels called Action Stages, some of which must be opened using keys hidden in the Adventure Field. Once the player accesses an Action Stage, they are tasked with a specific objective, which is different for each character. Sonic must reach the level's end similarly to prior Sonic the Hedgehog games; Tails must reach the end before Sonic; Knuckles must find three hidden shards of the Master Emerald; Amy must solve puzzles and avoid being caught by a robot; Big must fish for his pet frog; and Gamma must fight his way through stages using projectiles as a defense.

Some levels include minigames separate from the main story. These feature different styles of gameplay, among them rail shooting, racing, pinball, and sandboarding. Some minigames can only be accessed with particular characters. Fulfilling certain objectives allows the player to obtain bonus items. Unlocked minigames and stages the player has completed can be accessed from a Trial Mode on the title screen.

As with previous Sonic installments, players can collect golden rings, which can grant them protection from a single enemy or hazard as well as an extra life if 100 are collected. Also scattered throughout the levels are canisters containing power-ups, such as speed shoes, additional rings, temporary invincibility, and protective shields, and 1-ups. In several stages, the player engages Robotnik or Chaos in a boss fight and must deplete the boss's health meter to proceed. Point markers act as checkpoints where the character can respawn after losing a life.

Players may also discover Chao Gardens, hidden, protective environments inhabited by Chao, a virtual pet. Players can hatch, name, and interact with multiple Chao, and they can raise the status of their Chao by giving them small animals, which can be collected by defeating enemies within the Action Stages. The Dreamcast's handheld Visual Memory Unit (VMU) allows the player to download the minigame Chao Adventure, in which their Chao walks through a course to evolve and improve its skills. Evolving one's Chao improves its performance in competitions called Chao Races. Eggs that can produce special types of Chao are hidden throughout the Adventure Fields. Players can earn emblems by playing through Action Stages, searching through the Adventure Fields, or winning Chao Races. Each Action Stage has three emblems that can be earned by replaying the stages and fulfilling objectives, such as beating the level within a time limit.

== Plot ==
The mad scientist Doctor Robotnik seeks a new way to defeat his nemesis, Sonic, and conquer the world. He learns about Chaos, a creature that, thousands of years ago, helped to protect the Chao and the all-powerful Master Emerald, which balances the power of the seven Chaos Emeralds. When a tribe of echidnas sought to steal the power of the Emeralds, breaking the harmony they had with the Chao, Chaos retaliated by using the Emeralds' power to transform into a monstrous beast, Perfect Chaos, and wipe them out. Tikal, a young echidna who befriended Chaos, imprisoned it in the Master Emerald along with herself. Robotnik shatters the Master Emerald to release Chaos and tests its natural form on the city of Station Square.

After police fail to defeat Chaos, Sonic and Tails work to stop Robotnik from empowering it with the Chaos Emeralds. Knuckles, the only remaining echidna, sets out to find the shards of the Master Emerald. Robotnik activates a new series of robots, including E-102 Gamma, and orders them to find Froggy, a frog who ate a Chaos Emerald; Froggy's owner, Big, seeks him as well. Back in Station Square, Sonic's friend Amy protects a Flicky being pursued for its Chaos Emerald. When she and the Flicky are captured, Amy convinces Gamma not to work for Robotnik. Gamma helps her escape before seeking out and destroying the other robots in his series. Gamma confronts Beta and successfully destroys him and frees the Flicky inside, but is fatally wounded from the fight. However, Gamma regains memories of the Flicky within him before collapsing, shutting off his auto-repair system. Gamma sacrifices himself by self-destructing, freeing the trapped Flicky within him. Meanwhile, Tails foils Robotnik's contingency plan to destroy Station Square via a missile strike.

Although Sonic disrupts Robotnik's plans, Chaos absorbs the Chaos Emeralds and transforms into Perfect Chaos. It rebels against Robotnik and destroys Station Square. Through flashbacks from Tikal, who was also released from the Master Emerald, Sonic realizes that Chaos has been in constant torment and sorrow, and that imprisoning it again will not stop it. He uses the Chaos Emeralds to transform into Super Sonic and defeats Perfect Chaos. Chaos calms down when it sees the Chao living peacefully in Station Square, and Tikal takes it somewhere safe to live in peace. Sonic pursues a fleeing Robotnik.

== Development ==
=== Background ===
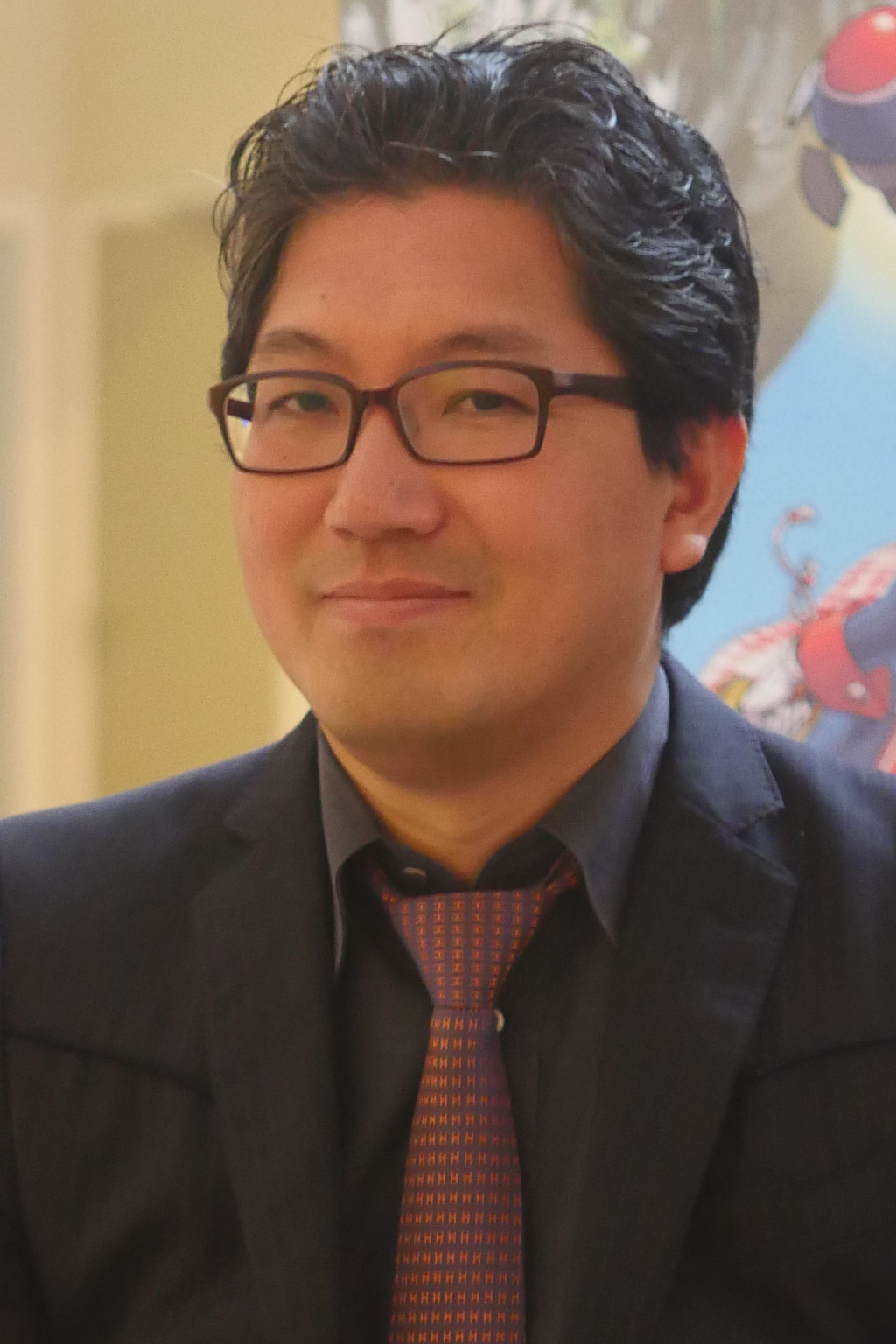
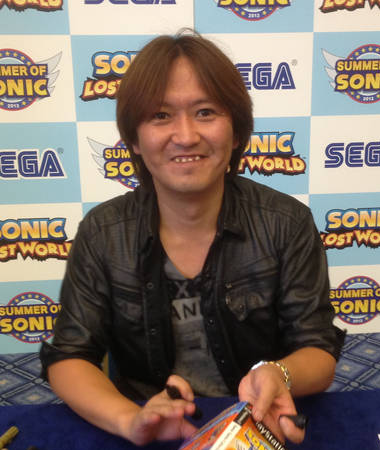
Yuji Naka (left) and Takashi Iizuka (right) produced and directed Sonic Adventure, respectively.

During the early 1990s, Sega was one of the most successful video game companies due to the rise of its Genesis console. Genesis sales were driven by the popularity of Sega's flagship franchise of 2D platform games, Sonic the Hedgehog. During this time, series co-creator Yuji Naka worked with Sega Technical Institute (STI) in the United States to develop Sonic games. After the completion of Sonic & Knuckles in 1994, Naka returned to Japan to work with Sonic Team. STI began developing Sonic X-treme for the Sega Saturn, planned as the first Sonic the Hedgehog game to feature full 3D gameplay. X-treme suffered a series of setbacks and was canceled in 1996. The cancellation was an important factor in the Saturn's commercial failure, leaving it with no original Sonic platform game. Meanwhile, Naka and Sonic Team developed original Saturn games, such as Nights into Dreams (1996).

Naka wanted a 3D Sonic game, but felt that only Sonic Team should undertake the endeavor; his refusal to let STI use the Nights game engine was instrumental in X-treme's cancellation. Due to the lack of Sonic games on the Saturn, (Note: Only three Sonic games were produced for the Saturn: Sonic 3D Blast in 1996, and Sonic Jam and Sonic R in 1997. Sonic R was the only original game in the series for the Saturn, as 3D Blast and Jam were ports of Genesis games.) according to Retro Gamer, Sonic became part of the "background" by mid-1997, so "it was astonishing to see that, just six years after his debut, Sonic was already retro." Nights into Dreams designer Takashi Iizuka felt that Sonic fans had been let down because Sonic Team was not focusing on the series. Additionally, Kazuyuki Hoshino, who would serve as art director on Sonic Adventure, said he thought during the Saturn era Sonic had become outdated.

=== Conception ===
In August 1996, shortly after the completion of Nights into Dreams, Iizuka proposed Sonic Adventure as a role-playing-style Sonic game with a greater emphasis on storytelling. Sonic Team started to work on it in April 1997 on the Saturn with a 20-strong team. Sonic Team created the first prototype using the Nights engine, but the Saturn's limited capabilities made development difficult. Sega president Hayao Nakayama informed Naka of the Saturn's successor, the Dreamcast, and he believed the new console would allow Sonic Team to create the ultimate Sonic game. When the team learned the Dreamcast was nearing completion, they moved development to take advantage of its greater quantity of RAM, stronger CPU, and the VMU. Not wanting to waste their completed work, they placed it as a bonus in the compilation game Sonic Jam, the final Sonic game for the Saturn. Development on the Dreamcast began in July 1997.

Iizuka served as director on Sonic Adventure, while Naka produced. One of the largest video games created at the time, the team had grown to 60 after 10 months, and over 100 developers worked on the game in total. Sonic Team undertook development in conjunction with the Dreamcast, aiming to release the game in December 1998, even if it meant making improvements after release. Developing Sonic Adventure at the same time as the system, which was not completed until two months before release, gave Iizuka influence over the console's development; for example, he was able to request more RAM for the console specifically for Sonic Adventure. According to former Sega of America producer Mark Subotnick, Naka canceled Geist Force, an on-rails shooter that was planned as a Dreamcast launch game, so he could use its proprietary software for Sonic Adventure.

=== Characters and art ===
Sonic was redesigned to appear slimmer and more "mature" by Yuji Uekawa.

Sonic Team felt challenged by the new hardware to recreate Sonic and his world in a new way. They began development using the character designs from the Genesis games, but quickly discovered the characters' bodies were too short and their heads too big, making them difficult to see. Retro game characters, such as Pac-Man, were also being reborn in a more "urban" fashion around the same time, something that made Sonic Team jealous and feel the original character designs were dated. As such, Yuji Uekawa redesigned each character to suit the transition to 3D and to give them "new, edgy, more Western" design. Looking to the animation of Walt Disney and Looney Tunes for inspiration, he made Sonic more mature, taller and slimmer, and gave him longer quills. He darkened his blue color and gave him green irises to contrast with the rest of his color scheme, as well as reference Green Hill Zone. Uekawa tried to make Sonic look like a comic book character and compared the style to graffiti. After redesigning Sonic, he made the other characters fit this new art style. Hoshino noted that the characters' longer limbs made it easier to recreate their 2D poses in 3D.

Sonic Adventure features two new playable characters, Big and Gamma. Sonic Team had already implemented an in-game fishing rod with no context or use, leading to the creation of Big. Big was designed to be giant and relaxed so the player would not expect something more intense. Gamma and his playstyle were created in response to fans who wanted elements of a shoot 'em up in Sonic and because of Iizuka's desire to include "some type of satisfying gameplay that couldn't be done with Sonic". Neither Big nor Gamma were intended to play a large role, so both of their campaigns were short. The antagonist, Chaos, had been conceived for Sonic X-treme. Iizuka wanted a villain who would have been impossible on older hardware and settled on something liquid and transparent. He presented the concept to Naka, who was impressed. Chaos was intended to have realistic blue scales in his final form, but this was abandoned because of the technological constraints of the Dreamcast.

While some Sonic games, such as Sonic CD (1993), contained limited voice work, Sonic Adventure was the first Sonic game to feature extensive voice acting. The decision was made early in development as the game was more story-focused than previous Sonic games. Sonic Team's staff had differing opinions about how Sonic should sound. Iizuka recalled that the only element they agreed on was to avoid using an anime voice actor, favoring a film actor with an "over-the-top" voice. Sonic Team cast Jun'ichi Kanemaru as Sonic. In an interview celebrating his 30th anniversary as a voice actor, Kanemaru said one reason he was cast was because of his ability to speak English. After Sonic Team USA was formed, they hired American actors to translate the Japanese script. The English-language voice cast consists of Ryan Drummond as Sonic, Corey Bringas as Tails, Michael McGaharn as Knuckles, Jennifer Douillard as Amy, Jon St. John as Big and E-102 Gamma, and Deem Bristow as Robotnik. Iizuka used Sonic Adventure to introduce Robotnik's Japanese name, "Dr. Eggman", to western audiences; he accomplished this by having Sonic insult Robotnik when they meet for the first time in-game. Similarly, he avoided referring to Tails as "Miles", which he was commonly called in Japan.

Because Sonic Adventure was a Dreamcast launch game, the team strove to demonstrate the console's capabilities with realistic graphics. To achieve a more realistic feel for the environments, the core members of Sonic Team visited temples, jungles, and ancient ruins in Mesoamerican landscapes, including Cancún, Guatemala, and Peru. While Sonic Team members had to draw artwork by hand for games in the past, for Sonic Adventure they were able to use photographs taken during their visits as textures. The greatest influences were the Tikal ruin in Guatemala and Machu Picchu in Peru. The character Tikal was inspired by Peru and took her name from the Guatemalan ruins. The 3D visuals were created using a Voodoo2 graphics chip.

=== Design ===
The levels were designed to feature gameplay similar to the original Genesis games and to take at least five minutes to complete. One of the biggest challenges the Adventure designers faced was transitioning Sonic's 2D style to 3D. In the Genesis Sonic games, the player simply had to go right to reach the end of a level, but in Sonic Adventure they could move in every direction. The designers created models for the stages before testing it as the player character, resulting in trial and error. This made Iizuka realize the importance of the game's camera. Some levels, such as the Lost World, were rebuilt dozens of times. Sonic Team split levels into parts to save memory. One particular difficulty was defeating enemies; in the 2D games, enemies were beaten simply by jumping on them, but this was harder to achieve in a 3D game. Therefore, Sonic was given the ability to target enemies in mid-air.

Iizuka said the cinematic sequences were conceived to take advantage of the environments, "giving the player an element of discovery in addition to the platforming". The team also wanted to add elements unexpected in a platform game; for example, the level in which Tails sandboards was inspired by a group of sandboarders in Ica, Peru. Some levels reference past Sega games, such as Ice Cap (1994's Sonic the Hedgehog 3) and the Tornado levels (1995's Panzer Dragoon). When seeing the completed level designs, Iizuka and Naka decided to repurpose them for other player characters. Iizuka said they felt it would be "a waste if Sonic just quickly ran through the levels that we spent so much time creating". After Sonic, the first characters added were Tails and Knuckles; Tails's stages turned portions of Sonic's levels into races, while Knuckles's treasure-hunting missions were designed to contrast with the others' straightforward ones. Sonic Adventure was the first time Amy was playable in a Sonic platformer, and Iizuka aimed to use her to add tension, such as hiding from pursuers, that Sonic's gameplay could not offer.

Because Sonic Adventure had a stronger emphasis on storytelling than previous games in the series, the team implemented hub worlds to "draw the players deeper into the world." The hub worlds' emphasis on exploring to find new areas and power-ups was inspired by The Legend of Zelda. According to Iizuka, the team tried to include as much content as possible. One addition was the Chao-raising system, which Iizuka conceived to take advantage of the VMU. Sonic Team had used a similar virtual pet system, the "A-Life", in Nights into Dreams; Iizuka used the A-Life as a base, while improving it with the VMU and the option to improve its skills. Iizuka hoped it would be made into a character players could touch and raise. It was also designed to appeal to casual gamers not familiar with games like Sonic, and to add replay value. The design took considerable time to finalize and had to be made as simple as possible because the virtual pet's look changes form as it evolves.

=== Music ===
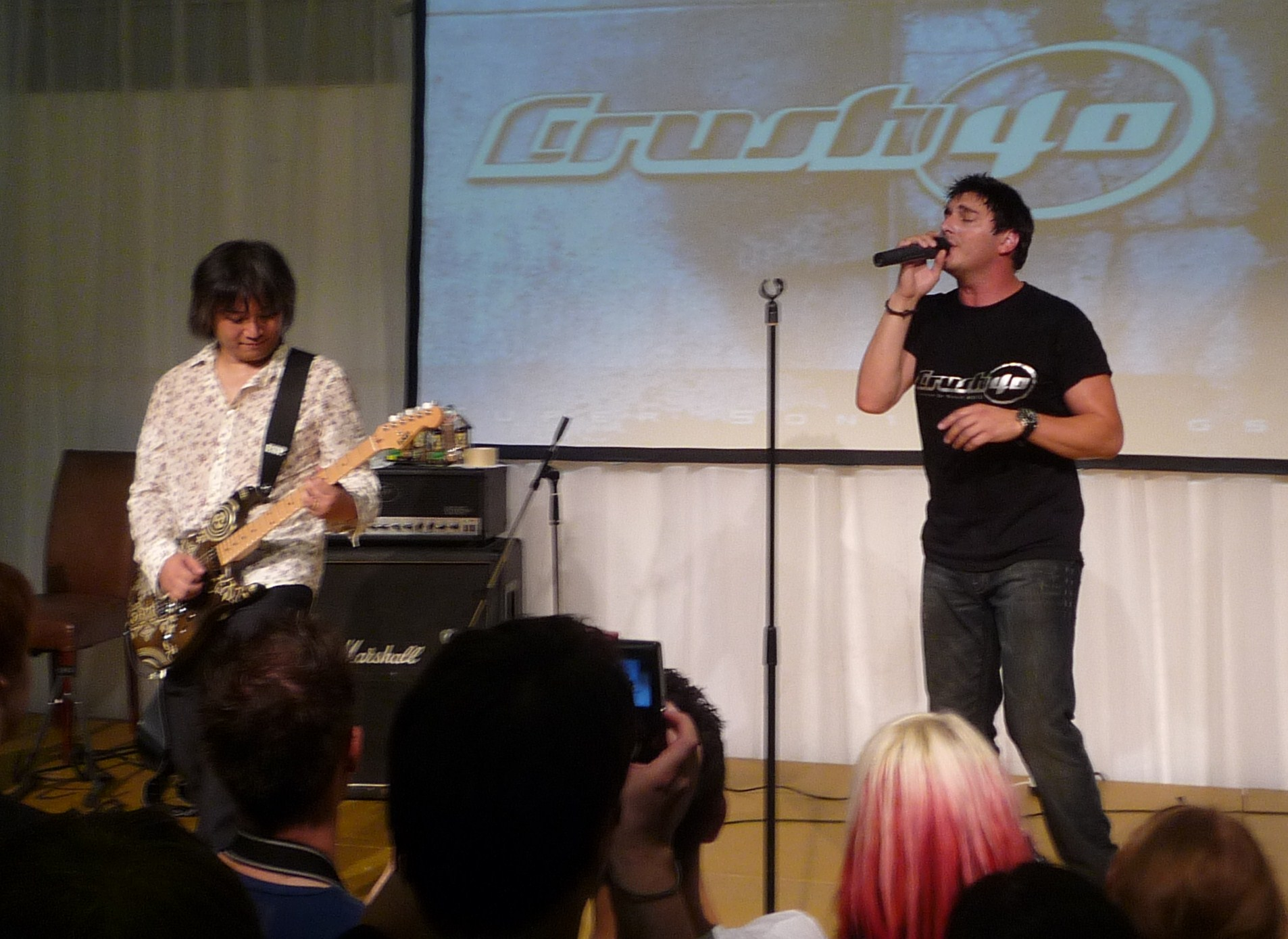
Jun Senoue (left) and Johnny Gioeli (right) in 2010

Sonic Adventure's score was primarily composed by Jun Senoue, with additional music by Fumie Kumatani, Kenichi Tokoi, and Masaru Setsumaru. Adventure was Senoue's first project as sound director and its scope meant he had many more responsibilities, including schedule management, compared to his previous games. Despite this, Senoue said he did not feel much pressure, as he was a Sonic fan and had contributed to previous games' soundtracks.

In contrast to previous Sonic games, which featured electropop soundtracks, the Adventure sound team preferred "hot, funky, and rock 'n' roll" music. Iizuka noted that Sonic Team's primary goal with Adventure was "to evoke the essence of Sonic by going from 2D to 3D", and felt the music needed to exceed fan expectations due to previous Sonic soundtracks' popularity. He stated a new style was adopted because the Dreamcast's sound was a significant advance from that of the Genesis; Senoue added he felt more comfortable composing rock music and wanted to create music everyone could enjoy. Despite the different styles, Senoue did retain some music from the Genesis Sonic games: the music for the Windy Valley and Twinkle Park levels were rearranged from Sonic 3D Blast (1996), while the level clear jingle was taken from Sonic 3. He chose to reuse his 3D Blast tracks because he felt they were strong enough to be more widely heard, as they were only used for the Genesis version (which was not released in Japan).

Senoue composed several songs with English lyrics to highlight the various characters' personalities, and collaborated with Tokoi and Kumatani to polish them. The main theme, "Open Your Heart", was performed by Hardline's Johnny Gioeli; other songs were performed by Gioeli, Marlon Saunders, Dred Foxx, Ted Poley, Nikki Gregoroff, and Tony Harnell. Sonic Adventure marked Senoue's first collaboration with Gioeli; the two later formed the band Crush 40 (originally known as Sons of Angels), and continue to make music together. Iizuka was inspired to use "Open Your Heart" as the final boss music by films, which he noted often use main themes during dramatic events. Iizuka also felt that the songs helped define Knuckles and Amy's personalities, as they had not received much character development in Sonic games until Adventure.

== Release ==
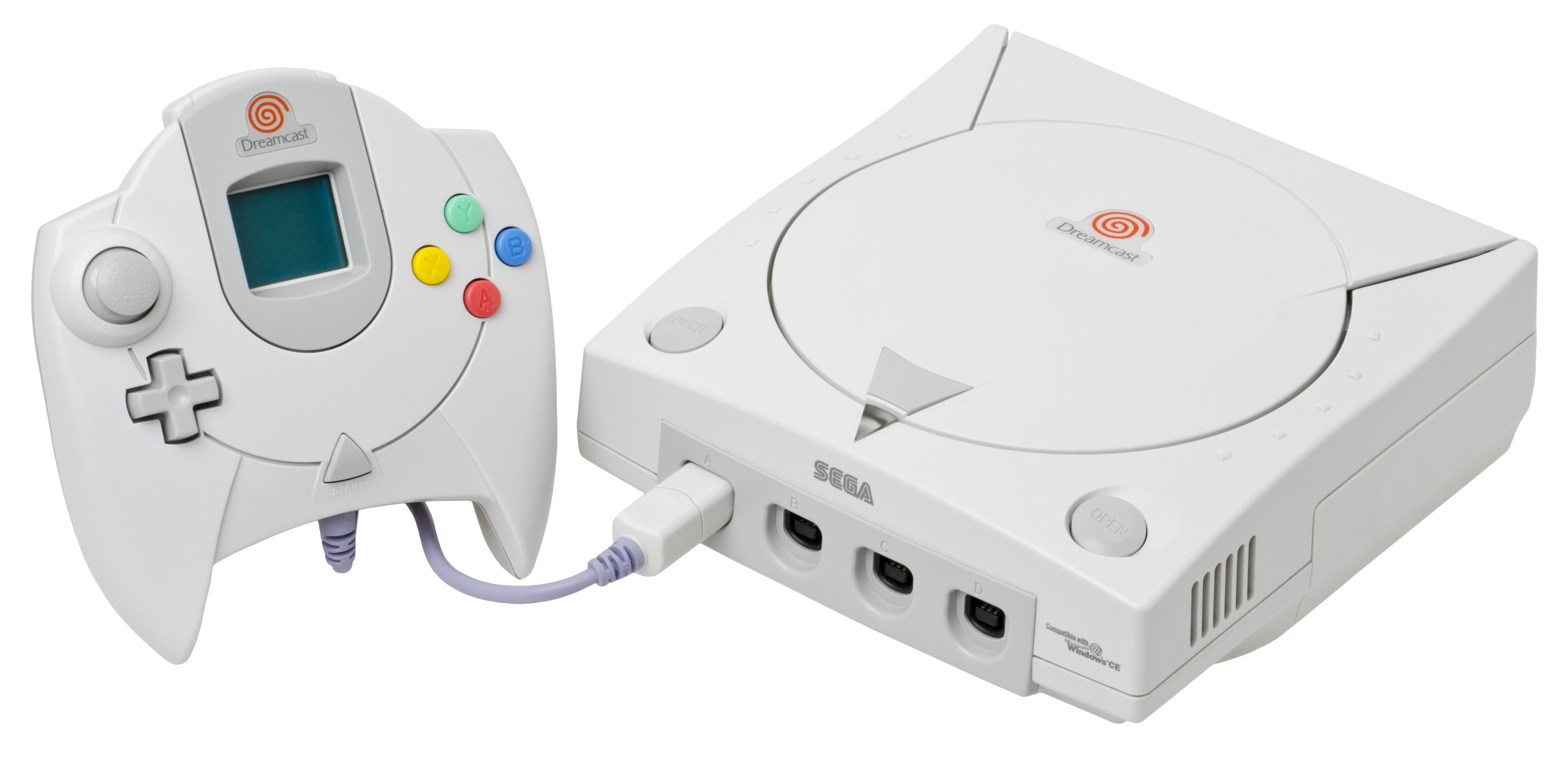
Sonic Adventure was released for the Dreamcast in Japan in December 1998 and in the West in September/October 1999.

Sonic Adventure was kept a secret during production, though screenshots were leaked in mid-1998 and plans for a 3D Sonic game had long been rumored. It was unveiled by Naka and the rest of Sonic Team on August 22, 1998, at the Tokyo International Forum. The team showed off several dynamic elements, such as a chase sequence from the first level and Tails's sandboarding sequence. The presentation ended with a live performance of "Open Your Heart" alongside a RealVideo clip montage. Naka described the debut as intense, having "[given his] all" to make it fit for release.

On December 23, 1998, Sonic Adventure was released in Japan. The Japanese version shipped with many glitches; according to Iizuka, Sonic Team did not have time to fix them due to the tight schedule. Several members of Sonic Team flew to Sega of America to establish Sonic Team USA and patch and translate the game. Prior to the launch of the Dreamcast in the United States, Sega made an exclusive deal with Hollywood Video to allow customers to rent the Dreamcast console along with a non-retail version of the game, Sonic Adventure: Limited Edition. The promotion began on July 15, 1999, and took place at 1,055 Hollywood Video stores across the country.

The localized version was released in North America on September 9, 1999, as a launch game, and in Europe on October 14, 1999. It includes Japanese and English-language audio and Japanese, English, Spanish, French and German subtitles. Online features—including Chao daycare and downloadable content (DLC) such as minigames and new level assets—were also added. From 1 December 1999 to 14 January 2000, Sega Europe partnered with Reebok to organise the "Sonic Speed Challenge", an online competition for European Sonic Adventure players. Participants downloaded a modified version of the Emerald Coast level, known as "Reebok Course", and competed to collect five pairs of Reebok DMX shoes in the shortest possible time. Prizes included Reebok footwear, with the overall winner receiving a Dreamcast demonstration kiosk and Reebok clothing worth 10,000 French francs.

The American release of Studio Pierrot's Sonic the Hedgehog (1996) original video animation coincided with the Western release of Sonic Adventure, while DIC Entertainment's Sonic Underground (1999) was commissioned to help promote the game. The localized version was released in Japan as Sonic Adventure International.

Before release, Sega projected to sell a million copies of Sonic Adventure. Sonic Adventure is the bestselling Dreamcast game; by August 4, 2006, it had sold 2.5 million copies, including 440,000 in Japan and 1.27 million in the US. In Europe, it sold 86,000 copies during its first five days on sale. In the UK, it was the top-selling Dreamcast launch game, and topped the all-formats chart. In Germany, Media Control ranked Sonic Adventure as the best-selling Dreamcast game for the January–February 2000 period. In Spain, Sonic Adventure was the third best-selling Dreamcast game through December 10, 1999, and in February 2000, Sega España general manager José Ángel Sánchez also identified Sonic Adventure as one of the games receiving the strongest response from Spanish players, alongside Sega Rally 2 and Soulcalibur. After the North American release, there were complaints of a number of Sonic Adventure discs failing to load. Sega of America determined that this was a software problem due to errors at one manufacturing facility and tracked the faulty software. Most copies were unaffected, and customers with defective copies could trade for working ones at retailers.

== Reception ==
Reception (Dreamcast)

Aggregate score
Aggregator	Score
GameRankings	87%

Review scores
Publication	Score
AllGame	4/5
Computer and Video Games	5/5
Edge	8/10
Electronic Gaming Monthly	9.5/10, 9/10, 9.5/10, 8.5/10
Game Informer	7.75/10
GameRevolution	B
GameSpot	9.2/10
IGN	8.6/10
Next Generation	4/5

As the first fully 3D Sonic platform game, Sonic Adventure was highly anticipated. It received critical acclaim, and Computer and Video Games (CVG) called it one of the greatest video games of all time. Sonic Adventure won a Blockbuster Entertainment Award in the "Favorite Sega Dreamcast Game" category, and was a runner-up for GameSpot's annual "Best Console Platform Game" award, which went to Rayman 2: The Great Escape (1999). It was a finalist for "Outstanding Achievement in Visual Engineering" during the 3rd Annual Interactive Achievement Awards, which went to Unreal Tournament.

The visuals and presentation attracted acclaim. Arcade described it as a "quantum leap forward" in aesthetics and visual detail in video games, and Hyper estimated it exceeded graphics of high-end personal computers. Brandon Justice of IGN called it the most graphically impressive platform game released up to that date, praising its cinematic sequences and describing it as "engrossing, demanding, and utterly awe-inspiring". Peter Bartholow of GameSpot agreed and said only Soulcalibur's graphical quality surpassed it. Edge felt it was the "perfect" showcase for the Dreamcast's potential. The reviewers of Game Informer praised the graphics, with Andy McNamara advising to reserve high expectations toward the visuals rather than the gameplay.

The audio received mixed responses. Bartholow and Game Revolution's Colin Ferris called the full-motion video (FMV) cutscenes and voice acting well-produced and fitting, though Bartholow and Reiner noted poor lip-synching. In Electronic Gaming Monthly (EGM), Chris Johnston found the voices fitting, but Shawn Smith disliked them. Justice thought the cutscenes were repetitive and described the voice acting as "a complete joke" and "downright awful", particularly Tails's voice; Adam Sutton, also of IGN, later named the acting among the most annoying in a video game. Scott Marriott of AllGame was conflicted; he appreciated Tails's portrayal but found Sonic's and Knuckles's voices unfitting. Bartholow and Marriott praised the rock-style music, but Ferris described the score as "absolutely horrible".

The gameplay was generally praised. Dean Hager of EGM commended the replay value lent by the multiple playable characters with different story routes. Bartholow admired the straightforward, linear approach to the 3D platform genre and particularly praised it for keeping the basic gameplay of the original Genesis games. Justice said the game would keep players busy even after completion, noting its internet connectivity and other extras. However, Ferris said apart from being quicker, it did not advance the platform genre's design. McNamara found the six character campaigns short, but was grateful for their number. Paul Anderson and Andrew Reiner of Game Informer approved of the gameplay variety, though Anderson described the overall playability as "extremely cumbersome", and Reiner criticized the loose controls and frequent glitches. Retrospectively, 1001 Video Games You Must Play Before You Die called its environments vast and twisted, stating it "brilliantly" captured traditional Sonic elements. The Chao minigame was noted as a major departure from the gameplay of the series. Bartholow wrote that "while really just a diversion", the Chao were an interesting, fun addition, singling out their internet functions as a highlight. Marriott said the Chao helped increase the replay value, although it was "strange", required patience, and did not provide bonuses in the main game. Ferris called the Chao "a neat addition" and praised its use of the VMU.

Some critics compared Sonic Adventure to Super Mario 64—Nintendo's "groundbreaking" 1996 game that propelled the Nintendo 64 and the 3D platform genre. Edge said Sonic Adventure was a worthy rival to Super Mario 64, but Marriott wrote that Sonic Adventure was not as ambitious and that those looking for exploration would be disappointed with its linear gameplay. He compared it to the similarly linear Crash Bandicoot but felt Sonic Adventure was more confined. He praised the gameplay as varied and said its replay value was strong. Journalists Rusel DeMaria and Johnny L. Wilson retrospectively wrote Sonic Adventure was not as strong as Super Mario 64 and "failed to catch on with players in nearly the way that [Mario] had done", though it had fascinating features, such as "the use of the Tamagotchi-like memory card to incubate eggs for little pet creatures" and "some good action segments".

The camera system and glitches were criticized by many reviewers. Johnston warned that the camera's automatic adjustments affect the controls, leading to frequent accidental deaths. Justice called the camera "incredibly" frustrating and inconsistent, and Bartholow noted it caused problems with collision detection. Edge complained the camera sometimes goes behind walls. McNamara described the camera as "quirky and difficult to follow" to the point of frustration. Authors from GamesRadar retrospectively wrote that Sonic Adventure was "horrendously buggy", with characters falling through floors and getting stuck, but that the sheer amount of content made up for this.

Bartholow thought Sonic Adventure redefined the possibilities of the platform genre, and according to Alex Huhtala of CVG, "many things you thought were impossible to see and experience in computer games are now here". According to Blake Fischer of Next Generation, "Expert gamers may beat the game in only a day or two but, even then, the ride is worth the price of admission." Marriott wrote that the game was an impressive showing of the Dreamcast's potential and that it was among the best of the series. Edge said scenery pop-up and instances of poor collision detection are "minor flaws in an otherwise very fine piece of work". Arcade and CVG speculated that Sonic Adventure could save the Dreamcast, which had not sold well by the end of 1998. CVG also thought it could re-establish Sega as the dominant console manufacturer after the relatively unsuccessful Saturn.

== Post-release ==
=== Sequel ===
Although Sonic Adventure was a success, Dreamcast sales struggled to meet Sega's expectations, and the Adventure team was downsized. Sega directed a team of 11—significantly smaller than Adventure's team of 120—to begin working on Sonic Adventure 2. Adventure 2 made its debut at E3 2000 and was released in June 2001. The sequel was designed to be more action-oriented than the slower-paced, story-centric Adventure and to give all the characters equal playtime. Sonic Adventure 2 received positive reviews, but prior to its release, Sega announced it would transition from a first-party to a third-party software publisher, in response to the international failures of the Saturn and Dreamcast.

=== Rereleases ===
The original Sonic Adventure on the Dreamcast (top) compared to Sonic Adventure DX on the GameCube (bottom)

In June 2003, Sega released Sonic Adventure DX: Director's Cut, a port of Sonic Adventure for the GameCube and Windows. While mostly identical to the original release, Sonic Adventure DX features updated graphics, including updated textures and more detailed character models, aims for a frame rate of 60 instead of 30, and sports a redesigned Chao-raising system that uses connectivity with the Game Boy Advance (GBA). It includes 60 new missions and the option to unlock emulations of all 12 Sonic games released for the Game Gear. Additionally, Metal Sonic can be unlocked as a playable character if all 130 emblems are collected. These features were added to appeal to players of the original game.

In September 2010, Sega rereleased Sonic Adventure as a downloadable game for the Xbox 360 and PlayStation 3, followed by a Windows release in March 2011 via Steam. This version is based on Sonic Adventure DX and supports high-definition visuals at a 4:3 aspect ratio. Sonic Adventure DX's additional content was removed, but the mission mode and Metal Sonic can be reimplemented by purchasing additional DLC. The game was also included in the Dreamcast Collection compilation in 2011 and is backwards-compatible with the Xbox One and Xbox Series X/S.

=== Soundtracks ===
A two-disc soundtrack, Sonic Adventure "Digi-LOG Conversation" Original Sound Track, was released in Japan in January 1999. In May 2011, the soundtrack was rereleased to commemorate the Sonic franchise's 20th anniversary. A two-volume digital soundtrack was also released on iTunes and Spotify in September 2014 and January 2017, respectively. Brave Wave Productions released a vinyl LP version of the soundtrack including interviews with Senoue and Iizuka in 2018.

== Legacy ==
With most contemporary 3D platform games focusing on exploration and collecting items, Sonic Adventure stood out with its linear gameplay. According to GamesRadar, as one of the first sixth-generation console games, it changed the industry "forever". Joystiq wrote that both Adventure and the original Sonic the Hedgehog had innovated in 3D and 2D through effective linear level design and by feeling "good to play".

In 2009, GamePro listed Sonic Adventure as the seventh-best platform game, saying that it had not aged well in certain aspects but that its core gameplay remained among the best of the Sonic series. Several journalists ranked the game among the series's best, but Kotaku argued the addition of voice acting and greater focus on plot changed Sonic into "a flat, lifeless husk of a character, who spits out slogans and generally has only one personality mode, the radical attitude dude, the sad recycled image of vague '90s cultural concept".

Sonic Adventure DX received mixed reviews. GameSpot was disappointed the rerelease did not address the problems of the original version, iterating the graphics were only marginally different, and dissatisfied with its collision detection. GameSpot offered some praise for the extra features, such as the missions, but concluded players were better off playing the Dreamcast version. IGN agreed, calling it "a sloppy port of a game that has long been undeserving of its high praise." IGN noted its frequent frame rate drops and described its camera one of the worst in a video game. IGN said the connectivity to the GBA Sonic games added depth but concluded this was not enough to compensate for the port's problems. Nintendo World Report was more positive, praising the Game Gear games for retaining their multiplayer support and finding Sonic and Tails' gameplay enjoyable.

Reviews of the 2010 rerelease were generally unfavorable, with criticism directed at the perceived lack of effort put into the port. IGN called it "so fundamentally flawed that it borders on unplayable", observing that the sections that worked best required the least input from the player. IGN criticized the lack of widescreen support but offered minor praise for its steady frame rate. 1UP.com lambasted the port for what they called its slapdash quality, criticizing its display, controls, and dated design, and saying that it "feels like it wasn't even tuned for the Xbox 360 controller and its analog sticks." Destructoid was less harsh, writing that fans of the franchise would be able to enjoy the game but warning casual players that "all you'll find is a relic that was once considered greatness."

=== Influence ===
Many of Sonic Adventure's designs and concepts were reused in later Sonic games. The direction, basic gameplay, and Uekawa's modernized character designs became series staples. The first level in the 2006 Sonic the Hedgehog reboot heavily references Sonic Adventure's Emerald Coast stage. To celebrate the Sonic series's 20th anniversary in 2011, Sega released Sonic Generations, which reused aspects from past games in the franchise. The PlayStation 3, Xbox 360, and Windows versions contain reimagined versions of the Speed Highway level and the Perfect Chaos boss fight, and the Nintendo 3DS version contains a remake of Emerald Coast.

Several characters that first appeared in Sonic Adventure appeared in later games. As well as appearing in Sonic Generations, Chaos is an antagonist in the 2017 entry Sonic Forces; it and Gamma are playable characters in the 2004 fighting game Sonic Battle; and a recreation of its boss fight appears in Mario & Sonic at the Olympic Winter Games. The Chao creatures also feature predominantly in later games. One of the characters introduced in Adventure, Big the Cat, became infamous for his negative reception. Game Informer considered his gameplay painful and boring, while Destructoid decried his portrayal as a "mentally handicapped imbecile" and his voice actor's incoherent performance. Big is widely considered by video game journalists the worst character in the Sonic franchise, and was named one of the worst game characters in a poll conducted by 1UP.com.

A concept for Sonic Adventure 3 was reworked into the 2008 game Sonic Unleashed. In 2017, Iizuka said there were no plans for a third Sonic Adventure game, saying it would not advance the series's design. He did not rule out the idea, saying "if we can get the gameplay to evolve and get to a place where Adventure 3 makes sense, then you might see an Adventure 3 come out". In 2018, Iizuka expressed interest in remaking Sonic Adventure, but had ruled out the prospect by 2025. He said that bringing Adventure to modern standards would take the same effort as developing a new game, which he preferred.

Sonic Adventure influenced Spark the Electric Jester 3 (2022), an indie game developed by the former Sonic fan game developer Felipe Daneluz. PC Gamer characterized it as a spiritual successor to Sonic Adventure.

=== Adaptations ===
Sonic Adventure was adapted in the second season of the 2003 Sonic the Hedgehog anime series Sonic X. The Japanese voice cast from the game reprised their roles, but the American licensing corporation 4Kids Entertainment hired a new cast for the English-language dub. The American publisher Archie Comics adapted Adventure in its Sonic the Hedgehog comic book series, which accounted for the altered character designs and established that Station Square was hidden beneath Sonic's planet, Mobius. An Adventure adaptation was the last original story published in the British publisher Fleetway's Sonic the Comic before its cancellation.
