= SA3 =

SA3 can refer to the following:

- SA-3 Goa, the NATO reporting name of the Isayev S-125, a Soviet surface-to-air missile system
- Sonic Advance 3, a Game Boy Advance game
- SA3 coupler, an automatic coupler for railway use
