= Sonic Battle =

2003 video game

- Developer: Sonic Team
- Publisher: Sega: NA: THQ
- Director: Tomoyuki Hayashi
- Producer: Yuji Naka
- Designers: Tomoyuki Hayashi; Asahiko Kikuchi
- Artist: Hisanobu Kometani
- Writer: Asahiko Kikuchi
- Composers: Tatsuyuki Maeda; Kenichi Tokoi; Hideaki Kobayashi
- Series: Sonic the Hedgehog
- Platform: Game Boy Advance
- Release: JP: December 4, 2003; NA: January 7, 2004; PAL: February 27, 2004
- Genre: Fighting game
- Modes: Single-player, multiplayer

Sonic Battle is a 2003 fighting game developed by Sonic Team and published by Sega for the Game Boy Advance. It is the second fighting game in the Sonic the Hedgehog series, after Sonic the Fighters (1996). Taking place between the events of Sonic Advance 2 (2002) and Sonic Advance 3 (2004), Sonic Battle revolves around various characters fighting over an ancient robot. It was released in Japan in December 2003 and in North America and Europe in early 2004. The game received a mixed response from critics.

== Gameplay ==
Shadow the Hedgehog participates in a battle with Miles "Tails" Prower and Knuckles the Echidna. The 3D stage features a grassy environment with Chao-themed ruins.

Battles are fought in 3D arenas with up to four players. Each character has a set of attacks and abilities. Most attacks are used with B, including the combo (1st, 2nd, and 3rd Attack), Air Attack, Upper Attack (used to knock opponents straight up), Heavy Attack (used to knock opponents away), and Aim Attack (used to pursue an opponent after the Heavy Attack). The A button is used to jump, and the L button lets the player block attacks, or heal damage if the button is held. The playable characters also have unique special moves, the three types being Shot, Power, and Set. Shot moves center around using a projectile to damage the opponent from a distance. Power moves focus on dealing damage quickly in a single move. Trap moves generally involve using a type of bomb to surprise-attack the enemy. However, only a limited number of special moves can be selected. Shot, Power, and Trap must be allocated to three slots: Ground, Air, and Defend. The special move the player sets to Ground will be used when pressing R on the ground. The move the player sets to Air will be used when pressing R in mid-air. The last slot, Defend, has a different function; when a player sets a certain type of special move to Defend, then every time an enemy uses the same type of special moveset, it will automatically be blocked.

Each player has two vital stats, a health bar and an Ichikoro Gauge. When health is completely depleted, the player is KO'd and loses one life (in a survival match) or the one who KO'd them gets a point (in a KO match). The Ground, Air, and Defend settings are chosen at the beginning of the match, and every time the player respawns. As a player takes damage, blocks attacks, or heals, the Ichikoro Gauge fills up. When it is full, the next special move the player does will instantly KO anyone it hits. However, if they chose to defend against that type of special, or successfully block, their Ichikoro Gauge will be filled instantly. Players healing damage will also slowly fill up their Ichikoro Gauge, but are still vulnerable to attacks.

=== Characters ===
The game features ten playable characters. Eight are playable in the game's Story Mode: Sonic the Hedgehog, Miles "Tails" Prower, Knuckles the Echidna, Amy Rose, Shadow the Hedgehog, Rouge the Bat, Cream the Rabbit, and the original character Emerl. By defeating opponents in the Story Mode, the player will gain "skill cards", which Emerl can equip to customize his moveset and utilize other characters' abilities. Two additional characters, E-102 Gamma and Chaos, can be unlocked for use in Battle Mode and Challenge Mode after they are defeated in Story Mode.

=== Minigames ===
The game includes five mini-games. The only mini-game available at the beginning of the game is "Soniclash", in which players try to knock their opponents off the fighting arena to gather points. In "Tails' Fly and Get", players fly around and try to collect more rings than their opponents. "Knuckles' Mine Hunt" is a single-player game based on the computer game Minesweeper. In "Amy's Treasure Island", players move around and search for emeralds. In "Shadow's Speed Demon", the players race against each other.

== Plot ==
While studying the diary of his grandfather, Professor Gerald Robotnik, Dr. Eggman learns of an artifact Gerald had unearthed: a 4000-year-old sentient weapon called the Gizoid created by an ancient civilization. Eggman attempts to get the dormant Gizoid to work properly, but is unsuccessful and abandons it at Emerald Beach. Sonic the Hedgehog finds the Gizoid, which activates and develops a link with him after Sonic demonstrates his abilities.

The Gizoid, which Sonic names Emerl due to its ability to use the Chaos Emeralds, demonstrates the power to perfectly replicate any moves it sees and quickly gets wrapped up in the affairs of Sonic's friends, allies and rivals. Through his encounters with Miles "Tails" Prower, Rouge the Bat, Knuckles the Echidna, Amy Rose, Cream the Rabbit, and Shadow the Hedgehog, Emerl learns of the world and of concepts like friendship. As they train together, the group discovers that Emerl becomes stronger and develops more sentience with each Chaos Emerald which he obtains, and begin searching for the remaining Emeralds to help the robot develop. While searching, they are repeatedly attacked by the forces of Eggman, who now wants to retrieve the weapon, including a rebuilt E-102 Gamma and a series of imperfect Emerl duplicates under the name "E-121 Phi".

Eventually, all the Chaos Emeralds are obtained and Emerl achieves full sapience. In a last attempt, Eggman decides to lure Emerl onto his new Death Egg to capture him. The two battle, and Emerl emerges victorious, but Eggman uses his new Final Egg Blaster to force Emerl to override his link to Sonic with Eggman's own. However, this overloads Emerl, deleting his personality and making him go haywire. The rogue Gizoid then turns the blaster towards the planet Earth, and Sonic is sent to stop him before the Earth is destroyed. Sonic defeats Emerl, who briefly reverts to his previous personality and bids his friends farewell before overloading with energy and self-destructing, leaving the shards of the Chaos Emeralds he acquired behind. Sonic returns home to his friends, who are saddened by the loss of Emerl. When asked if he believes Emerl is truly gone, Sonic reassures everyone that they will see him again someday.

== Development and legacy ==
The game was officially announced at the 2003 Electronic Entertainment Expo (E3) and Tokyo Game Show, both of which featured playable demos. The game was released in late-2003 in Japan as part of the "Year of Sonic", and early-2004 by THQ in the United States following a deal between both companies. Internationally, the game was published by Sega Europe and distributed by THQ as part of a Game Boy Advance co-publishing agreement made by the two companies. Sonic Battle was adapted in the second season of the 2003 Sonic the Hedgehog anime television series Sonic X, with the story arc being a loose adaptation for the show.

== Reception ==
Reception

Aggregate score
Aggregator	Score
Metacritic	69/100

Review scores
Publication	Score
Game Informer	6/10
GamePro	3.5/5
GameSpot	7.7/10
GameSpy	3/5
IGN	8/10
Nintendo Power	7.4/10

The game received generally mixed reviews from critics, according to review aggregator site Metacritic. While some critics praised the game's "surprisingly deep arena-fighting gameplay", graphics, and multiplayer mode, others dismissed it for its "limited moveset" and use of 2D sprites on a 3D fighting arena.

IGN gave the game a positive review, saying "It does try hard to be what Smash Bros. is, and even though the game doesn't quite reach the same status Nintendo and HAL created for the Nintendo consoles, Sonic Battle has enough stuff to make it one of the top original fighters on the Game Boy Advance system." GameSpy also gave a positive review, saying "A solid and pleasantly deep arena beat-'em-up with lots of longevity, and though the presence of the Hedgehog and his posse adds absolutely nothing to the game, it's nice to see them getting work in these tough economic times." Nintendo Power gave a more mixed review, saying, "Moves are limited, but the overall experience is tons of fun." GamePro also gave a mixed review, criticizing the game's story mode, saying "The biggest problem with Sonic Battle is the poor game design in Story mode. Earning Skill Points, and thereby new abilities for Emerl the Robot, is a grueling ordeal."
