= Kazuyuki Hoshino =

Japanese video game designer and developer

- 星野 一幸
- Born: March 1, 1967 (age 59); Japan
- Education: Tama Art University
- Occupations: Creative director; game designer; character designer
- Employer: Sega (1991–present)
- Known for: Sonic the Hedgehog series; Nights into Dreams
- Title: Creative director of Sonic Team

Kazuyuki Hoshino (Japanese: 星野 一幸, Hepburn: Hoshino Kazuyuki) is a video game artist who works for Sonic Team as the studio's creative director. His first role involved working with Sega on Sonic the Hedgehog CD as a character/sprite, special-stage, and visual designer. He is notable for designing Metal Sonic, Amy Rose, and Shadow the Hedgehog. He was Sega Studio USA's art director and lead character designer until part of the studio was absorbed back into the Japanese parent company. At the American branch, he worked alongside Takashi Iizuka, as they both determined the best direction and style for their games. As of 2019, Hoshino is the creative director at Sonic Team.

== Works ==
Year	Title	Role
1993	Panic!	Graphic design
1993	Sonic CD	Character design, visual design
1995	Knuckles' Chaotix	Character design
1996	Nights into Dreams	Character design
1997	Sonic R	Artist
1997	Sonic Jam	Artist
1998	Burning Rangers	Internet support
1998	Sonic Adventure	Art director, enemy design
2001	Sonic Adventure 2	Art director, character design
2003	Sonic Heroes	Art director, enemy design, storyboard design
2005	Shadow the Hedgehog	Art director, character design
2006	Sonic Rivals	Art supervisor, character artwork
2007	Sonic Rivals 2	Art supervisor, character artwork
2007	Nights: Journey of Dreams	Art director, lead character designer
2009	Mario & Sonic at the Olympic Winter Games	Art director, graphic UI artist
2011	Mario & Sonic at the London 2012 Olympic Games	Senior art director
2013	Sonic Lost World	Project support
2013	Mario & Sonic at the Sochi 2014 Olympic Winter Games	Senior art director
2014	Puyo Puyo Tetris	Project support
2014	Sonic Boom: Rise of Lyric	Character supervisor
2014	Sonic Boom: Shattered Crystal	Character supervisor
2015	Sonic Runners	Project support
2016	Mario & Sonic at the Rio 2016 Olympic Games	Senior art director
2016	Sonic Boom: Fire & Ice	Project support
2017	Sonic Mania	Director of creative services, animation supervisor
2017	Sonic Forces	Director of creative services
2019	Team Sonic Racing	Director of creative services
2022	Sonic Frontiers	Character supervisor
