= Sonic Team =

Japanese video game developer

Sega Consumer Research and Development Dept. #2
- Logo used since 2000
- Trade name: Sonic Team
- Native name: ソニックチーム
- Romanized name: Sonikku chīmu
- Formerly: Sega R&D9 (1990–1991); Sega CS3 (1991–1999); Sega Software R&D Dept #8 (AM8) (1999–2000); Sonic Team, Ltd. (2000–2004); Sega GE1 (2005–2008)
- Type: Division
- Industry: Video games
- Predecessor: Sega R&D2
- Founded: 1990; 36 years ago
- Founders: Yuji Naka; Naoto Ohshima; Hirokazu Yasuhara
- Headquarters: Shinagawa, Tokyo, Japan
- Key people: Takashi Iizuka (studio head); Kazuyuki Hoshino (creative director)
- Products: List of Sonic Team games
- Brands: Sonic the Hedgehog
- Parent: Sega Corporation
- Website: www.sonicteam.com

Sega CS R&D Dept. No. 2, (Note: Japanese: セガ 第二CS研究開発部, Hepburn: Sega Dai Ni CS Kenkyū Kaihatsubu) doing business as Sonic Team, (Note: Japanese: ソニックチーム, Hepburn: Sonikku chīmu) is a Japanese video game developer owned by Sega. Sonic Team is best known for its Sonic the Hedgehog series. Some Sonic Team games, such as the original Sonic games and Nights into Dreams (1996), are considered among the best ever made.

The initial team, formed in 1990, consisted of Sega developers including programmer Yuji Naka, artist Naoto Ohshima and level designer Hirokazu Yasuhara. The team took the name Sonic Team in 1991 with the release of their first game, Sonic the Hedgehog, for the Sega Genesis. It was a major success and contributed to millions of Genesis sales. The next Sonic games were developed by Naka and Yasuhara in America at Sega Technical Institute, while Ohshima worked on Sonic CD in Japan at CS3. Naka returned to Japan in 1994 to become the head of CS3, later renamed R&D No. 8. During this time, the division took on the Sonic Team brand but developed games that do not feature Sonic, such as Nights into Dreams (1996) and Burning Rangers (1998).

Following the release of Sonic Adventure in 1998, some Sonic Team staff moved to the United States to form Sonic Team USA and develop Sonic Adventure 2 (2001). With Sega's divestiture of its studios into separate companies, R&D No. 8 became SONICTEAM Ltd. in 2000, with Naka as CEO and Sonic Team USA as its subsidiary. Sega's financial troubles led to several major structural changes in the early 2000s; the United Game Artists studio was absorbed by Sonic Team in 2003, and Sonic Team USA became Sega Studios USA in 2004.

After Sammy Corporation purchased Sega in 2004, Sonic Team was reincorporated to become Sega's GE1 research and development department. Naka left Sega during the development of Sonic the Hedgehog (2006), and Sega Studios USA was merged back into Sonic Team in 2008. Sonic games released over the following decade received poorer reviews. The studio head, Takashi Iizuka, acknowledged that Sonic Team had prioritized shipping over quality.

== History ==
=== 1990: Formation and Sonic the Hedgehog ===
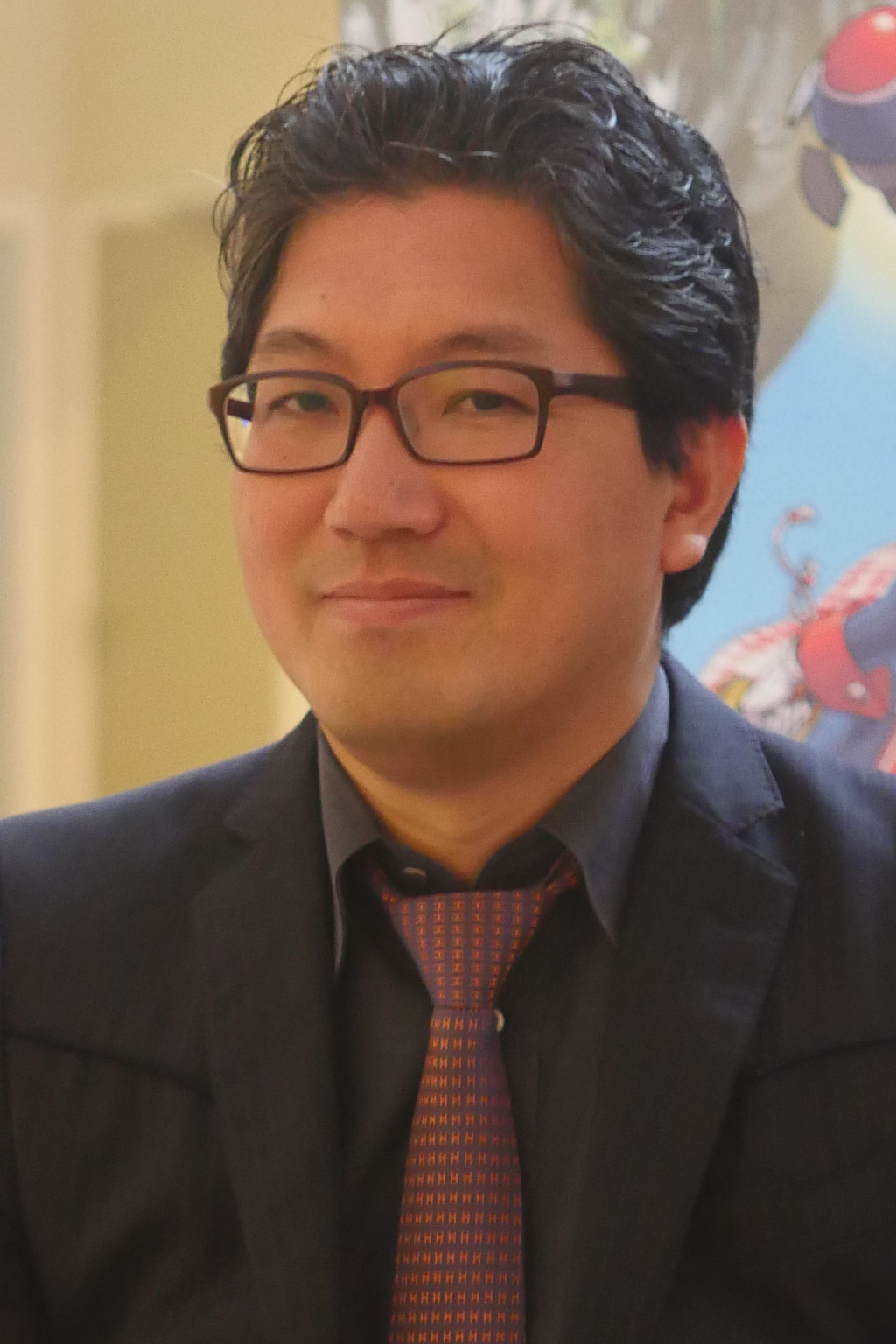
Yuji Naka, programmer for Sonic Team and later division president

In 1984, programmer Yuji Naka was hired into Sega's Consumer Development division. His first project was Girl's Garden, which he and Hiroshi Kawaguchi created as part of their training process. For his next game, Phantasy Star (1987) for the Master System, Naka created pseudo-3D animation effects. He met artist Naoto Ohshima while working on the game.

During the late 1980s and early 1990s, a rivalry formed between Sega and Nintendo due to the release of their 16-bit video game consoles: the Sega Genesis and the Super Nintendo Entertainment System. Sega needed a mascot character that would be as synonymous with their brand as Mario was with Nintendo. Sega wanted a killer app and character that could appeal to an older demographic than preteens, demonstrate the capabilities of the Genesis, and ensure commercial success in North America.

Sega held an internal competition to submit characters designs for a mascot. Ohshima designed a blue hedgehog named Sonic, who was inserted into a prototype game created by Naka. The Sonic design was refined to be less aggressive and appeal to a wider audience before the division began development on their platform game Sonic the Hedgehog. According to Ohshima, Sega was looking for a game that would sell well in the United States as well as in Japan. Ohshima and Naka already had the game and character ready, with Ohshima having worked with Sega's toy and stationery department on design ideas. Ohshima said their progress encouraged Sega to select their proposal, as theirs was the only team to have put in a high amount of time and effort. This left him confident their proposal would be selected.

The Sonic the Hedgehog project began with just Naka and Ohshima, but grew to involve two programmers, two sound engineers, and three designers. Hirokazu Yasuhara joined to supervise Naka and Ohshima and develop levels, and became the lead designer. He satisfied Naka's request for a simple, one-button design by having Sonic do damage by jumping. Sonic the Hedgehog was released in 1991 and proved a major success, contributing to millions of sales of the Genesis. The team took the name Sonic Team for the game's release. Naka referred to Sonic Team as only a "team name" at this point; the division's other games did not use this particular name.

=== 1992–1998: Re-establishment and new intellectual properties ===
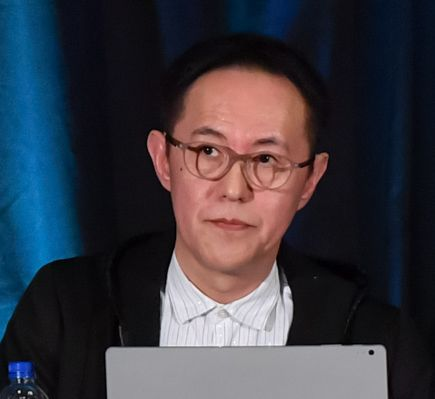
Naoto Ohshima, Sonic Team artist who designed the Sonic the Hedgehog character

Shortly after the release of Sonic the Hedgehog, Naka, Yasuhara, and a number of other Japanese developers relocated to California to join Sega Technical Institute (STI), a development division established by Mark Cerny intended as an elite studio combining the design philosophies of American and Japanese developers. While Naka and Yasuhara developed Sonic the Hedgehog 2 at STI, Ohshima worked on Sonic CD, a prequel for the Sega CD add-on. Though Naka was not directly involved in the Sonic CD development, he exchanged design ideas with Ohshima.

Following the release of Sonic & Knuckles in 1994, Naka returned to Japan, having been offered a role as a producer. He was placed in charge of Sega's Consumer Development Department 3, also known as CS3. Naka was reunited with Ohshima and brought with him Takashi Iizuka, who had also worked with Naka's team at STI. In the mid-1990s, Sonic Team started work on new intellectual property, leading to the creation of Nights into Dreams (1996) and Burning Rangers (1998) for the Sega Saturn. Naka stated that the release of Nights is when Sonic Team was truly formed as a brand.

Few Sonic games were released for the Saturn. Since Sonic Team was preoccupied with Nights into Dreams, it outsourced the development of the last Genesis Sonic game, Sonic 3D Blast (1996), to the British studio Traveller's Tales. Sonic Team developed bonus levels for a Saturn port, released in place of the canceled STI game Sonic X-treme. Yasuhara moved to London to assist the development of Sonic R (1997), a Sonic racing game co-developed by Sonic Team and Traveller's Tales. The only other Saturn Sonic game was Sonic Jam (1997), a compilation of the Genesis games with a 3D overworld Sonic Team used to experiment with 3D Sonic gameplay.

The Saturn was a commercial failure, which some writers attributed to its lack of a major Sonic game. Sega shifted focus to the Dreamcast, which launched in Japan in 1998. Sonic Team saw the Dreamcast as an opportunity to revisit the Sonic series. They had begun working on a 3D Sonic game for the Saturn, but development moved to the Dreamcast to align with Sega's plans. Iizuka led the project; Iizuka had long wanted to create a Sonic role-playing video game and felt the Dreamcast was powerful enough to achieve his vision. The game became Sonic Adventure (1998), the bestselling Dreamcast game.

Around this time, CS3 was renamed Sega Research and Development Department 8 (R&D No. 8). It was sometimes referred to as AM8 or "Sega-AM8", as Sega's R&D department was named Sega Amusement Machine Research and Development (AM), though Sonic Team focused solely on home console games. Until 2000, media referred to Sonic Team as both R&D No. 8 and AM8.

=== 1999–2003: Dreamcast, Sonic Team USA and formation into company ===
In 1999, shortly after the release of Sonic Adventure, twelve Sonic Team members relocated to San Francisco to establish Sonic Team USA, while others remained in Japan. Shortly afterward, a number of key employees—including Ohshima—left Sega to form a new studio, Artoon. Sonic Team achieved success in the arcade market in 1999 with the rhythm game Samba de Amigo, also released for the Dreamcast. They also began developing online games; in 1999, they released ChuChu Rocket!, a puzzle game that used the Dreamcast's online capabilities. In 2000, Sonic Team launched the role-playing game Phantasy Star Online to critical and commercial success.

Sega began to restructure its studios in October 2000 and spun off its software development divisions into subsidiary companies. When the departments took new names, Naka felt it important to preserve the Sonic Team brand name, and the division's new legal name as a company was Sonic Team, Ltd. (株式会社ソニックチーム, Kabushiki-gaisha Sonikku chīmu) Naka was installed as the CEO, and Sonic Team USA became a subsidiary of the new company.

Despite a number of well received games, Sega discontinued the Dreamcast in 2001 and exited the hardware business. Sega transitioned into a third-party developer and began developing games for multiple platforms. From 2000, Sonic Team in Japan began to release fewer games, with a few releases such as the puzzle game Puyo Pop and the action game Billy Hatcher and the Giant Egg. The company changes and lack of a Sega console affected Sonic Team; according to Naka, in a 2006 interview, "Our approach was always to create strategic title concepts, which included the hardware. We do somewhat miss the idea of being able to address these constant challenges." Yasuhara left to join Naughty Dog after Sega discontinued the Dreamcast. However, originality remained important for Naka; Sonic Team developed Sonic Heroes instead of Sonic Adventure 3, explored the digital card game genre with Phantasy Star Online Episode III: C.A.R.D. Revolution, and developed the original game Billy Hatcher. Naka credited the enduring success of Sonic to the character's appeal to children. Naka's goal was to appeal to the largest audience possible and to appeal to children.

Early in 2003, Sega president Hideki Sato and COO Tetsu Kamaya announced they were stepping down from their roles, with Sato being replaced by Hisao Oguchi, the head of Hitmaker. As part of Oguchi's restructuring plan, he announced his intention to consolidate Sega's studios into "four or five core operations". Sonic Team was financially solvent and absorbed United Game Artists, another Sega subsidiary led by Tetsuya Mizuguchi and known for the music games Space Channel 5 (1999) and Rez (2001).

=== 2004–present: Reintegration and recent years ===
In 2004, the Japanese company Sammy acquired a controlling interest in Sega and formed Sega Sammy Holdings. Prior to the merger, Sega began the process of re-integrating its subsidiaries into the main company. Sonic Team USA became Sega Studios USA, while SONICTEAM Ltd. became Sega's Global Entertainment 1 research and development division (GE1). The team is still referred to as Sonic Team. As of 2005, senior Sega figures including Toshihiro Nagoshi and Yu Suzuki were reporting to Naka; according to Takashi Yuda, he was involved in all Sega game development. Naka announced his departure on 8 May 2006 and formed a new studio, Prope, to focus on creating original games. He left Sonic Team during the development of Sonic the Hedgehog (2006), released as part of the 15-year anniversary of the Sonic franchise. Sonic the Hedgehog was panned for its bugs and design flaws; Sonic Unleashed (2008) received mixed reviews, but sold well. Both games were released for the PlayStation 3 and Xbox 360; Sonic Team also developed a series of Sonic games for the Wii and Nintendo DS, such as 2007's Sonic and the Secret Rings.

By 2010, Sonic Team had become part of CS Research and Development No. 2 (CS2), Sega Studios USA had been reintegrated into the Japanese team, and Iizuka had become the head of the department. After a series of poorly received Sonic releases, Sonic Team refocused on speed and more traditional side-scrolling in Sonic the Hedgehog 4: Episode I and II, Sonic Generations, and Sonic Colors, which all received better reviews. In 2015, Iizuka recognized in an interview with Polygon that Sonic Team had prioritized shipping games over quality, and had not had enough involvement in later third-party Sonic games, such as Sonic Boom: Rise of Lyric. He hoped the Sonic Team logo would stand as a "mark of quality"; he planned to release quality games and expand the Sonic brand, while retaining the modern Sonic design. Iizuka stated that doing new things with the franchise has had good and bad points at times. Sonic Team's first Sonic game exclusive to smartphones, Sonic Runners, was released in 2015. An endless runner, it was designed to have more replay value than other games in the genre. Sonic Runners received mixed reviews and was unprofitable, resulting in its discontinuation a year later.

In 2017, Sonic Team developed and released Sonic Forces, and oversaw the development of Sonic Mania by Christian Whitehead. Forces was aimed at a broad audience of young and adult players, while Mania was focused on fans of the original Genesis games. Mania became the best reviewed Sonic game in fifteen years following nearly two decades of mixed reviews for the franchise. Sonic Team also contributed to the 2019 reboot of Sakura Wars. Sonic Team is embedded within the second business division of Sega, which had more than 400 employees as of 2023. Over time, several Sega development staff continue to get involved that did not work on Sonic or Sonic Team games before. This includes staff that worked on Shinobi and Nightshade, sports game developers that worked on Virtua Striker and Let's Make a Soccer Team, and decades later in the 2020s, arcade game developers that worked on Initial D and Maimai.

== Sonic Team USA / Sega Studios USA ==
Sega Studios USA
- Formerly: Sonic Team USA
- Type: Division
- Industry: Video games
- Founded: 1999; 27 years ago
- Defunct: 2008; 18 years ago
- Fate: Merged with Sonic Team
- Headquarters: San Francisco, California, United States
- Key people: Takashi Iizuka
- Parent: Sonic Team, Ltd. (1999–2004); Sega of America (2004–2008)

Sonic Team USA, later Sega Studios USA, was a division of Sega and of Sonic Team while Sonic Team was a subsidiary company. It was founded when twelve Sonic Team members, including Takashi Iizuka, relocated to San Francisco, California, in 1999, and was a subsidiary of Sonic Team, Ltd. by 2000. The team worked on game development, translation, and market studies in the United States, until they returned to Japan and merged back into Sonic Team in 2008.

Sonic Team USA translated Sonic Adventure and tested ChuChu Rocket! in America before beginning work on Sonic Adventure 2. They took inspiration from their location in San Francisco, as well as Yosemite National Park and other areas of the United States. Sonic Adventure 2 was released on 23 June 2001, and was ported to the GameCube. The next Sonic Team USA project was Sonic Heroes (2003), the first Sonic game developed for multiple platforms. Sonic Team USA took a different approach with Heroes from the Sonic Adventure games, focusing on gameplay more similar to the Genesis games to which even casual gamers could adapt.

After Sonic Team, Ltd. merged back into Sega in 2004, Sonic Team USA was renamed Sega Studios USA. Its next project was Shadow the Hedgehog, released in 2005, a spin-off starring Shadow. Unlike previous games, Shadow the Hedgehog was targeted at older players and featured different gameplay styles, including the use of guns and different endings to the game. Shadow the Hedgehog was panned for its level design and mature themes, but was a commercial success, selling at least 1.59 million copies.

The final Sega Studios USA game was Nights: Journey of Dreams, the sequel to Nights into Dreams and the first Nights game since the cancellation of Air Nights in 2000. Iizuka felt it was important to retain the original game's concepts while developing new mechanics, and released it on the Wii, a more family-oriented console. Journey of Dreams was also designed to have a more European feel, in contrast to the Sonic games, which were more American. The sound and CGI were completed by Sonic Team in Japan, while Sega Studios USA handled the rest of the development for the 2007 release.

Sega Studios USA oversaw the development of Sonic Rivals (2006) and Sonic Rivals 2 (2007) by Backbone Entertainment. In 2008, Sega Studios USA merged with Sonic Team, making Iizuka the head of Sonic Team and a vice president of product development for Sega. In 2016, Iizuka relocated to Los Angeles to oversee development, with the goal of making the studios there "a centralized hub for the global brand".

== Games ==
Sonic Team has developed a number of video games, with many of them becoming bestsellers. The studio is best known for its Sonic the Hedgehog series of platform games, which account for the majority of Sonic Team's work; the 1991 release of Sonic the Hedgehog is considered one of the most important moments in video game history, as it propelled Genesis sales and displaced Nintendo as the leading game company. Sonic Team have also developed games including action games such as Nights into Dreams, Burning Rangers, and Billy Hatcher and the Giant Egg, the online puzzle game ChuChu Rocket!, the online role-playing game Phantasy Star Online, and the music game Samba de Amigo. Phantasy Star Online is credited for introducing online RPGs to consoles and was the first online RPG for many players. According to Sean Smith of Retro Gamer, few companies could claim to have released as many AAA games over such a long period, especially between 1991 and 2000. Some Sonic Team games, such as the original Sonic games for the Genesis and Nights, are considered among the best video games ever made. Iizuka said Sonic Team would be open to developing a third Nights game or a sequel to Knuckles' Chaotix (1995), if Sega were to commission them.

Sega and Sonic Team have been criticized for their handling of Sonic the Hedgehog after the beginning of the 3D era of video games. Edwin Evans-Thirlwell of Eurogamer described the 3D Sonic games as "20-odd years of slowly accumulating bullshit", and wrote that unlike Sonic's main competitor, Nintendo's Mario series, Sonic in 3D never had a "transcendental hit". Sega of America marketing director Al Nilsen and Sonic Mania developer Christian Whitehead said the large number of characters was problematic, with Whitehead describing them as "padding". In 2015, Sega CEO Haruki Satomi acknowledged that Sega had "partially betrayed" the trust of their fans and hoped to focus on quality over quantity.

== See also ==
- Sega development studios
- Sega AM1
- Sega AM2
- Amusement Vision
- Smilebit
