= List of Sonic the Hedgehog video games =

List of video game series

Sonic the Hedgehog
- Genres: Platform; Racing; Fighting; Party; Role-playing; Sports; Visual novel
- Developers: Sonic Team; Ancient; Sega; Aspect; Sega Technical Institute; SIMS Co., Ltd.; Sega AM2; Traveller's Tales; SNK; Dimps; Backbone Entertainment; Sumo Digital; BioWare; Gameloft; Hardlight; Big Red Button Entertainment; Sanzaru Games; Christian Whitehead; Headcannon; PadogaWest Games; Hyperkinetic Studios; Gamefam Studios; Arzest; Rovio Entertainment
- Publisher: Sega
- Creators: Naoto Ohshima; Yuji Naka; Hirokazu Yasuhara
- Platform: List: Master System; Genesis; Game Gear; Sega CD; 32X; Pico; Saturn; Dreamcast; Game Boy Advance; GameCube; Nintendo DS; Wii; Nintendo 3DS; Wii U; Nintendo Switch; Nintendo Switch 2; PlayStation 2; PlayStation Portable; PlayStation 3; PlayStation Vita; PlayStation 4; PlayStation 5; Xbox; Xbox 360; Xbox One; Xbox Series X/S; Windows; macOS; Arcade; Game.com; Neo Geo Pocket Color; N-Gage; Leapster; LeapFrog Didj; Java ME; Mobile phones; Android; iOS; Nex Playground
- First release: Sonic the Hedgehog; June 23, 1991
- Latest release: Sonic Racing: CrossWorlds; September 25, 2025
- Spin-offs: Sonic Boom

Sonic the Hedgehog is a video game series. It is published by Sega, with entries developed by Sega, Sonic Team, Traveller's Tales, Dimps, SIMS Co., Ltd., BioWare, Hardlight, Aspect, Sumo Digital, Gameloft, Gamefam Studios, Arzest, and Rovio Entertainment. The series debuted in 1991 with the video game, Sonic the Hedgehog, released on the Mega Drive video game console (named Sega Genesis in North America). In its earliest history, most Sonic the Hedgehog games had been platform games released on Sega video game consoles and handheld game consoles (handhelds), dating from the Sega Genesis to the Sega Dreamcast. However, some of the original games were ported into versions on newer third-party home consoles and developed by various companies. As of March 2011, the series has collectively sold 89 million copies worldwide across both the platform games and spin-offs.

The most popular games in the franchise are platform games, although the series also includes other genres such as racing games, fighting games, action-adventure games, role-playing video games, and sports video games. Each game focuses on the titular protagonist Sonic the Hedgehog, an anthropomorphic blue hedgehog. It also features a large cast of other characters such as Doctor Ivo "Eggman" Robotnik, Miles "Tails" Prower, Knuckles the Echidna, Amy Rose, Shadow the Hedgehog, and the Chao creatures.

== 2D platformers ==
Game	Details
Sonic the Hedgehog (16-bit) Original release dates: EU: June 21, 1991; NA: June 23, 1991; JP: July 26, 1991	Release years by system: 1991 – Mega Drive/Genesis; 2006 – Game Boy Advance, Wii Virtual Console; 2007 – iOS, Xbox Live Arcade; 2013 – Android, Nintendo 3DS; 2018 – Nintendo Switch
Sonic the Hedgehog (16-bit) Original release dates: EU: June 21, 1991; NA: June 23, 1991; JP: July 26, 1991	Notes: Titled Sonic the Hedgehog Genesis on the Game Boy Advance.
Sonic the Hedgehog (8-bit) Original release dates: NA: October 25, 1991; EU: October 25, 1991; JP: December 28, 1991	Release years by system: 1991 – Game Gear, Master System; 2008 – Wii Virtual Console; 2013 – 3DS Virtual Console
Sonic the Hedgehog 2 (16-bit) Original release dates: JP: November 21, 1992; NA: November 24, 1992; EU: November 24, 1992; AU: December 1, 1992	Release years by system: 1992 – Mega Drive/Genesis; 2007 – Wii Virtual Console, Xbox Live Arcade; 2010 – iOS; 2013 – Android; 2015 – Nintendo 3DS; 2020/2021 – Nintendo Switch
Sonic the Hedgehog 2 (8-bit) Original release dates: JP: November 21, 1992; EU: November 24, 1992; NA: December 1992	Release years by system: 1992 – Game Gear, Master System; 2008 – Wii Virtual Console; 2013 – 3DS Virtual Console
Sonic the Hedgehog CD Original release dates: JP: September 23, 1993; EU: October 18, 1993; NA: November 19, 1993	Release years by system: 1993 – Mega-CD/Sega CD; 1995 – Windows; 2011 – PlayStation Network, Xbox Live Arcade, iOS; 2012 – Android; 2013 – Ouya
Sonic Chaos Original release dates: EU: October 25, 1993; JP: November 19, 1993; NA: November 23, 1993	Release years by system: 1993 – Master System, Game Gear; 2009 – Wii Virtual Console
Sonic Chaos Original release dates: EU: October 25, 1993; JP: November 19, 1993; NA: November 23, 1993	Notes: Titled Sonic & Tails in Japan.
Sonic the Hedgehog 3 Original release dates: NA: February 2, 1994; EU: February 24, 1994; JP: May 27, 1994	Release years by system: 1994 – Mega Drive/Genesis; 2007 – Wii Virtual Console; 2009 – Xbox Live Arcade
Sonic & Knuckles Original release dates: JP: October 18, 1994; NA: October 18, 1994; EU: October 18, 1994; AU: November 19, 1994	Release years by system: 1994 – Mega Drive/Genesis; 2009 – Xbox Live Arcade, Wii Virtual Console
Sonic Triple Trouble Original release dates: JP: November 11, 1994; NA: November 1994; EU: November 1994	Release years by system: 1994 – Game Gear; 2012 – 3DS Virtual Console
Sonic Triple Trouble Original release dates: JP: November 11, 1994; NA: November 1994; EU: November 1994	Notes: Titled Sonic & Tails 2 in Japan.
Knuckles' Chaotix Original release dates: NA: April 20, 1995; JP: April 21, 1995; EU: May 1995	Release years by system: 1995 – 32X
Knuckles' Chaotix Original release dates: NA: April 20, 1995; JP: April 21, 1995; EU: May 1995	Notes: Introduces the Chaotix as playable characters: Vector the Crocodile, Espio the Chameleon, Charmy Bee and Mighty the Armadillo.
Tails Adventure Original release dates: JP: September 22, 1995; EU: September 1995; NA: November 1995	Release years by system: 1995 – Game Gear; 2013 – 3DS Virtual Console
Sonic Blast Original release dates: NA: November 1996; EU: November 1996; JP: December 13, 1996	Release years by system: 1996 – Game Gear; 1997 – Master System; 2012 – 3DS Virtual Console
Sonic Blast Original release dates: NA: November 1996; EU: November 1996; JP: December 13, 1996	Notes: Titled G Sonic in Japan.
Sonic the Hedgehog Pocket Adventure Original release dates: NA: December 4, 1999; EU: February, 2000; JP: May 25, 2000	Release years by system: 1999 – Neo Geo Pocket Color
Sonic Advance Original release dates: JP: December 20, 2001; NA: February 3, 2002; EU: March 8, 2002	Release years by system: 2001 – Game Boy Advance
Sonic Advance 2 Original release dates: JP: December 19, 2002; NA: March 9, 2003; EU: March 28, 2003	Release years by system: 2002 – Game Boy Advance
Sonic Advance 3 Original release dates: NA: June 7, 2004; JP: June 17, 2004; EU: June 18, 2004	Release years by system: 2004 – Game Boy Advance
Sonic Rush Original release dates: NA: November 15, 2005; JP: November 18, 2005; EU: November 23, 2005	Release years by system: 2005 – Nintendo DS
Sonic Rush Adventure Original release dates: EU: September 14, 2007; NA: September 18, 2007; AU: September 27, 2007; JP: October 18, 2007	Release years by system: 2007 – Nintendo DS
Sonic the Hedgehog 4: Episode I Original release dates: WW: October 7, 2010	Release years by system: 2010 – iOS, PlayStation Network, WiiWare, Xbox Live Arcade; 2011 – Windows Phone; 2012 – Android, Windows; 2013 – Ouya
Sonic the Hedgehog 4: Episode I Original release dates: WW: October 7, 2010	Notes: Named Project Needlemouse during development and early trailers.
Sonic the Hedgehog 4: Episode II Original release dates: WW: May 15, 2012	Release years by system: 2012 – Android, iOS, PlayStation Network, Windows, Xbox Live Arcade, 2013 – Ouya
Sonic Boom: Shattered Crystal Original release dates: NA: November 11, 2014; EU: November 21, 2014; AU: November 29, 2014; JP: December 18, 2014	Release years by system: 2014 – Nintendo 3DS
Sonic Boom: Shattered Crystal Original release dates: NA: November 11, 2014; EU: November 21, 2014; AU: November 29, 2014; JP: December 18, 2014	Notes: Based on the TV series Sonic Boom.; Titled Sonic Toon: Island Adventure in Japan.
Sonic Boom: Fire & Ice Original release dates: NA: September 27, 2016; EU: September 30, 2016; AU: October 1, 2016; JP: October 27, 2016	Release years by system: 2016 – Nintendo 3DS
Sonic Boom: Fire & Ice Original release dates: NA: September 27, 2016; EU: September 30, 2016; AU: October 1, 2016; JP: October 27, 2016	Notes: Based on the TV series Sonic Boom.; Titled Sonic Toon: Fire & Ice in Japan.
Sonic Mania Original release date: WW: August 15, 2017; JP: August 16, 2017	Release years by system: 2017 – Nintendo Switch, PlayStation 4, Windows, Xbox One
Sonic Mania Original release date: WW: August 15, 2017; JP: August 16, 2017	Notes: Developed by Christian Whitehead, Headcannon and PagodaWest Games.; An add-on by the name of Sonic Mania Plus was released in 2018.
Sonic Superstars Original release date: WW: October 17, 2023	Release years by system: 2023 – Nintendo Switch, PlayStation 4, PlayStation 5, Windows, Xbox One, Xbox Series X/S
Sonic Superstars Original release date: WW: October 17, 2023	Notes: First 2D Sonic game to feature 4-player multiplayer; First Sonic platformer to be developed by Arzest

== 3D platformers ==
Game	Details
Sonic 3D Blast Original release dates: NA: November 7, 1996; EU: November 14, 1996; JP: October 14, 1999	Release years by system: 1996 – Mega Drive/Genesis, Sega Saturn; 1997 – Windows; 2007 – Wii Virtual Console
Sonic 3D Blast Original release dates: NA: November 7, 1996; EU: November 14, 1996; JP: October 14, 1999	Notes: Celebrates Sonic's 5th anniversary, with new 3D gameplay.; Titled Sonic 3D: Flickies' Island in Japan and PAL regions.
Sonic Adventure Original release dates: JP: December 23, 1998; NA: September 9, 1999; EU: October 14, 1999; AU: December 1, 1999	Release years by system: 1998 – Dreamcast; 2003 – GameCube, Windows; 2010 – Xbox Live Arcade, PlayStation Network; 2012 – Onlive
Sonic Adventure Original release dates: JP: December 23, 1998; NA: September 9, 1999; EU: October 14, 1999; AU: December 1, 1999	Notes: Non-Dreamcast ports released with additional features as Sonic Adventure DX: Director's Cut.
Sonic Adventure 2 Original release dates: NA: June 18, 2001; JP: June 23, 2001; EU: June 23, 2001	Release years by system: 2001 – Dreamcast, GameCube; 2012 – Xbox Live Arcade, PlayStation Network, Windows
Sonic Adventure 2 Original release dates: NA: June 18, 2001; JP: June 23, 2001; EU: June 23, 2001	Notes: Celebrates Sonic's 10th anniversary, with the ability to play as both heroes: Sonic the Hedgehog, Miles "Tails" Prower and Knuckles the Echidna, and villains: Dr. Eggman, Shadow the Hedgehog and Rouge the Bat.; Non-Dreamcast and Windows ports released with additional features as Sonic Adventure 2 Battle.
Sonic Heroes Original release dates: JP: December 30, 2003; NA: January 5, 2004; EU: February 6, 2004	Release years by system: 2003 – GameCube, PlayStation 2, Xbox; 2004 – Windows; 2012 – PlayStation Network
Shadow the Hedgehog Original release dates: NA: November 15, 2005; EU: November 18, 2005; JP: December 15, 2005	Release years by system: 2005 – GameCube, PlayStation 2, Xbox
Sonic the Hedgehog Original release dates: NA: November 14, 2006; EU: November 24, 2006; AU: November 30, 2006; JP: December 21, 2006	Release years by system: 2006 – Xbox 360, PlayStation 3
Sonic the Hedgehog Original release dates: NA: November 14, 2006; EU: November 24, 2006; AU: November 30, 2006; JP: December 21, 2006	Notes: Celebrates Sonic's 15th anniversary, with the ability to play as Sonic the Hedgehog, Shadow the Hedgehog, and introduces the playable character Silver the Hedgehog.
Sonic and the Secret Rings Original release dates: NA: February 20, 2007; EU: March 2, 2007; AU: March 8, 2007; JP: March 15, 2007	Release years by system: 2007 – Wii
Sonic Unleashed Original release dates: NA: November 18, 2008; AU: November 27, 2008; EU: November 28, 2008; JP: December 18, 2008	Release years by system: 2008 – PlayStation 2, PlayStation 3, Wii, Xbox 360; 2009 – Mobile phone
Sonic Unleashed Original release dates: NA: November 18, 2008; AU: November 27, 2008; EU: November 28, 2008; JP: December 18, 2008	Notes: Titled Sonic World Adventure in Japan.
Sonic and the Black Knight Original release dates: NA: March 3, 2009; JP: March 12, 2009; AU: March 12, 2009; EU: March 13, 2009	Release years by system: 2009 – Wii
Sonic Colors Original release dates: AU: November 11, 2010; EU: November 12, 2010; NA: November 16, 2010; JP: November 18, 2010	Release years by system: 2010 – Wii, Nintendo DS; 2021 – PlayStation 4, Xbox One, Nintendo Switch, Microsoft Windows
Sonic Colors Original release dates: AU: November 11, 2010; EU: November 12, 2010; NA: November 16, 2010; JP: November 18, 2010	Notes: Remastered in 2021 with additional features as Sonic Colors: Ultimate.
Sonic Generations Original release date: NA: November 1, 2011; AU: November 3, 2011; EU: November 4, 2011; JP: December 1, 2011	Release years by system: 2011 – Xbox 360, PlayStation 3, Nintendo 3DS, Windows; 2024 – Nintendo Switch, Microsoft Windows, Xbox One, PlayStation 4, Xbox Series X/S, PlayStation 5; 2025 – Nintendo Switch 2
Sonic Generations Original release date: NA: November 1, 2011; AU: November 3, 2011; EU: November 4, 2011; JP: December 1, 2011	Notes: Celebrates Sonic's 20th anniversary, with levels spanning his entire gaming career.; Remastered in 2024 with additional features and bundled with Shadow Generations as Sonic X Shadow Generations.
Sonic Lost World Original release date: EU: October 18, 2013; AU: October 19, 2013; JP: October 24, 2013; NA: October 29, 2013	Release years by system: 2013 – Wii U, Nintendo 3DS; 2015 – Windows
Sonic Boom: Rise of Lyric Original release dates: NA: November 11, 2014; EU: November 21, 2014; AU: November 29, 2014; JP: December 18, 2014	Release years by system: 2014 – Wii U
Sonic Boom: Rise of Lyric Original release dates: NA: November 11, 2014; EU: November 21, 2014; AU: November 29, 2014; JP: December 18, 2014	Notes: Based on the TV series Sonic Boom.; Titled Sonic Toon: Ancient Treasure in Japan.
Sonic Forces Original release date: WW: November 7, 2017; JP: November 9, 2017	Release years by system: 2017 – Nintendo Switch, PlayStation 4, Microsoft Windows, Xbox One
Sonic Frontiers Original release date: WW: November 8, 2022	Release years by system: 2022 – Nintendo Switch, PlayStation 4, Microsoft Windows, Xbox One, PlayStation 5, Xbox Series X/S; 2026 – Nintendo Switch 2
Sonic Dream Team Original release date: WW: December 5, 2023	Release years by system: 2023 – Apple Arcade (iOS, macOS, tvOS)
Shadow Generations Original release date: WW: October 25, 2024	Release years by system: 2024 – Nintendo Switch, PlayStation 4, Microsoft Windows, Xbox One, PlayStation 5, Xbox Series X/S; 2025 – Nintendo Switch 2
Shadow Generations Original release date: WW: October 25, 2024	Notes: Bundled alongside a remaster of Sonic Generations as Sonic X Shadow Generations

== Racing games ==
Game	Details
Sonic Drift Original release date: JP: March 18, 1994	Release years by system: 1994 – Game Gear
Sonic Drift 2 Original release dates: JP: March 17, 1995; EU: March 1995; NA: November 1995	Release years by system: 1995 – Game Gear
Sonic Drift 2 Original release dates: JP: March 17, 1995; EU: March 1995; NA: November 1995	Notes: Titled Sonic Drift Racing in Europe.
Sonic R Original release dates: NA: October 31, 1997; JP: December 4, 1997; EU: December 11, 1997	Release years by system: 1997 – Sega Saturn; 1998 – Windows
Sonic Riders Original release dates: NA: February 21, 2006; JP: February 23, 2006; EU: March 17, 2006	Release years by system: 2006 – GameCube, PlayStation 2, Xbox, Windows
Sonic Rivals Original release dates: NA: November 16, 2006; EU: December 1, 2006; AU: December 7, 2006	Release years by system: 2006 – PlayStation Portable
Sonic Rivals 2 Original release dates: NA: November 13, 2007; AU: December 6, 2007; EU: December 7, 2007	Release years by system: 2007 – PlayStation Portable
Sonic Riders: Zero Gravity Original release dates: NA: January 8, 2008; JP: January 17, 2008; EU: February 22, 2008; AU: March 6, 2008	Release years by system: 2008 – PlayStation 2, Wii
Sonic Riders: Zero Gravity Original release dates: NA: January 8, 2008; JP: January 17, 2008; EU: February 22, 2008; AU: March 6, 2008	Notes: Titled Sonic Riders: Shooting Star Story in Japan.
Sonic & Sega All-Stars Racing Original release dates: NA: February 23, 2010; EU: February 26, 2010; AU: March 4, 2010	Release years by system: 2010 – Nintendo DS, PlayStation 3, Wii, Windows, Xbox 360, Mobile phone
Sonic Free Riders Original release dates: NA: November 4, 2010; EU: November 10, 2010; AU: November 18, 2010; JP: November 20, 2010	Release years by system: 2010 – Xbox 360
Sonic & All-Stars Racing Transformed Original release dates: AU: November 15, 2012; EU: November 16, 2012; NA: November 28, 2012	Release years by system: 2012 – PlayStation 3, Xbox 360, Wii U, PlayStation Vita; 2013 – Windows, Nintendo 3DS
Team Sonic Racing Original release dates: WW: May 21, 2019	Release years by system: 2019 – PlayStation 4, Xbox One, Nintendo Switch, Windows
Sonic Racing: CrossWorlds Original release date(s): WW: September 25, 2025	Release years by system: 2025 – PlayStation 4, PlayStation 5, Xbox One, Xbox Series X/S, Nintendo Switch, Nintendo Switch 2, Windows

== Mario & Sonic at the Olympic Games series ==
Game	Details
Mario & Sonic at the Olympic Games Original release dates: NA: November 6, 2007; JP: November 22, 2007; AU: November 22, 2007; EU: November 23, 2007	Release years by system: 2007 – Wii; 2008 – Nintendo DS
Mario & Sonic at the Olympic Games Original release dates: NA: November 6, 2007; JP: November 22, 2007; AU: November 22, 2007; EU: November 23, 2007	Notes: Titled Mario & Sonic at Beijing Olympics in Japan and Korea.
Sonic at the Olympic Games Original release dates: June 2008	Release years by system: 2008 – Mobile phone
Mario & Sonic at the Olympic Winter Games Original release dates: NA: October 13, 2009; AU: October 15, 2009; EU: October 16, 2009; JP: November 5, 2009	Release years by system: 2009 – Wii, Nintendo DS
Mario & Sonic at the Olympic Winter Games Original release dates: NA: October 13, 2009; AU: October 15, 2009; EU: October 16, 2009; JP: November 5, 2009	Notes: Titled Mario & Sonic at Vancouver Olympics in Japan.
Sonic at the Olympic Winter Games Original release date: NA: January 29, 2010	Release years by system: 2010 – iOS
Sonic at the Olympic Winter Games Original release date: NA: January 29, 2010	Notes: The game disappeared from the iPhone's App Store in March 2010. Neither Sega nor Apple gave any comment.
Mario & Sonic at the London 2012 Olympic Games Original release dates: NA: November 15, 2011; AU: November 17, 2011; EU: November 18, 2011; JP: December 8, 2011	Release years by system: 2011 – Wii; 2012 – Nintendo 3DS
Mario & Sonic at the Sochi 2014 Olympic Winter Games Original release dates: EU: November 8, 2013; AU: November 9, 2013; NA: November 15, 2013; JP: December 5, 2013	Release years by system: 2013 – Wii U
Mario & Sonic at the Rio 2016 Olympic Games Original release dates: JP: February 18, 2016; NA: March 18, 2016; EU: April 8, 2016	Release years by system: 2016 – Wii U, Nintendo 3DS, Arcade
Mario & Sonic at the Olympic Games Tokyo 2020 Original release date(s): JP: November 1, 2019; NA: November 5, 2019; EU: November 8, 2019	Release years by system: 2019 – Nintendo Switch; 2020 – Arcade
Mario & Sonic at the Olympic Games Tokyo 2020 Original release date(s): JP: November 1, 2019; NA: November 5, 2019; EU: November 8, 2019	Notes: The final game in the Mario & Sonic series before the licensing deal with the International Olympic Committee (IOC) expired.
Sonic at the Olympic Games Tokyo 2020 Original release dates: WW: May 7, 2020	Release years by system: 2020 – Android, iOS
Sonic at the Olympic Games Tokyo 2020 Original release dates: WW: May 7, 2020	Notes: The final game in the Sonic at the Olympic Games series before the licensing deal with the International Olympic Committee (IOC) expired.

== Arcade games ==
Game	Details
Waku Waku Sonic Patrol Car Original release dates: JP: December 1991	Release years by system: 1991 – Arcade
Waku Waku Sonic Patrol Car Original release dates: JP: December 1991	Notes: Children's ride in which players control Sonic in a police car.
SegaSonic the Hedgehog Original release dates: JP: October 1993	Release years by system: 1993 – Arcade
SegaSonic the Hedgehog Original release dates: JP: October 1993	Notes: Also termed Sonic the Hedgehog Arcade.; Platform game controlled by a trackball.; Features three playable characters: Sonic, new character Mighty the Armadillo (who would later re-appear as a playable character in Knuckles Chaotix and Sonic Mania Plus), and new character Ray the Flying Squirrel (who would not re-appear in the franchise outside of cameos until Sonic Mania Plus, an enhanced version of Sonic Mania).; Sonic Team planned to include this game in Sonic Gems Collection, but the trackball control scheme made this impossible.
SegaSonic Cosmo Fighter Galaxy Patrol Original release dates: JP: 1993; AU: 1997	Release years by system: 1993 – Arcade
SegaSonic Cosmo Fighter Galaxy Patrol Original release dates: JP: 1993; AU: 1997	Notes: Children's ride in which players control Sonic in a vertical space shooter.; Only released in English as part of Sega World Sydney.
SegaSonic Popcorn Shop Original release date: JP: 1993	Release years by system: 1993 – Arcade
SegaSonic Popcorn Shop Original release date: JP: 1993	Notes: Arcade minigame within a popcorn vending machine.; Sonic is controlled via a hand crank.
SegaSonic Cotton Candy Scramble Original release dates: JP: 1993	Release years by system: 1993 - Arcade
SegaSonic Cotton Candy Scramble Original release dates: JP: 1993	Notes: Arcade minigame within a cotton candy machine.; Patent released in July 2000.
Sonic the Fighters Original release dates: JP: June 1996; NA: July 1996	Release years by system: 1996 – Arcade; 2012 – PlayStation Network, Xbox Live Arcade
Sonic the Fighters Original release dates: JP: June 1996; NA: July 1996	Notes: Developed by Sega AM2.
Sonic Athletics Original release date(s): JP: April 25, 2013	Release years by system: 2013 – Arcade
Sonic Athletics Original release date(s): JP: April 25, 2013	Notes: An Exergame controlled by a treadmill.

== Educational games ==
Game	Details
Sonic the Hedgehog's Gameworld Original release dates: JP: August 1994; NA: November 1996	Release years by system: 1994 – Sega Pico
Tails and the Music Maker Original release date: NA: September 1994	Release years by system: 1994 – Sega Pico
Sonic's Schoolhouse Original release date: NA: October 18, 1996	Release years by system: 1996 – Windows
Sonic X Original release date: WW: 2007	Release years by system: 2007 – Leapster
Sonic The Hedgehog Original release date: NA: 2008	Release years by system: 2008 – Didj

== Sonic Cafe Games ==
Game	Details
Sonic Tennis Original release dates: JP: December 20, 2001	Release years by system: 2001 – Mobile phone
Sonic Golf Original release dates: JP: January 28, 2002	Release years by system: 2002 – Mobile phone
Sonic Fishing Original release dates: JP: March 25, 2002	Release years by system: 2002 – Mobile phone
Sonic Billiards Original release dates: JP: April 22, 2002	Release years by system: 2002 – Mobile phone
Good Friend Chao! Original release dates: JP: May 24, 2002	Release years by system: 2002 – Mobile phone
Sonic Bowling Original release dates: JP: July 22, 2002	Release years by system: 2002 – Mobile phone
Sonic Racing Shift Up Original release dates: JP: November 18, 2002	Release years by system: 2002 – Mobile phone
Sonic Racing Kart Original release dates: JP: July 28, 2003	Release years by system: 2003 – Mobile phone
Sonic Jump Original release dates: JP: February 21, 2005; NA: April 2007; UK: April 2007	Release years by system: 2005 – Mobile phone 2012 – Android, iOS
Sonic Jump Original release dates: JP: February 21, 2005; NA: April 2007; UK: April 2007	Notes: Was later ported to IOS and Android.
Sonic Kart 3D X Original release dates: JP: October 20, 2005	Release years by system: 2005 – Mobile phone
Sonic Speed DX Original release dates: JP: March 28, 2006	Release years by system: 2006 – Mobile phone
Sonic's Casino Poker Original release dates: JP: August 28, 2007	Release years by system: 2007 – Mobile phone
Sonic Jump 2 Original release dates: NA: May 20, 2008	Release years by system: 2008 – Mobile phone

== Other spin-offs ==
Game	Details
Sonic Eraser Original release date: JP: 1991; BR: 1995	Release years by system: 1991 – Mega Drive/Genesis
Sonic Eraser Original release date: JP: 1991; BR: 1995	Notes: A falling block puzzle video game released through Sega Meganet in which Sonic the Hedgehog, controlled by the player, must make random falling clusters of shapes disappear by aligning shapes of the same variety on a grid. The falling shapes include a red tetrahedron, a pink cross, a green gemstone, an orange octahedron, a white gemstone, a yellow tetrahedron and a blue sphere. The general aim for all game modes is to align two or more identical shapes with each other inside a 13x7 grid, which makes the shapes disappear, scores points, and creates empty space on the grid for other shapes. If lower shapes disappear, shapes stacked above may fall into their place, potentially causing more shapes to align and vanish in a chain reaction. Inevitably, the grid will become filled with shapes, and when the shapes stack to the top row of the grid, the game is over. The game features multiple modes, including a competitive two-player mode, a single-player mode against a computer, and a two-player cooperative mode. In the versus mode, players can attack each other like in Puyo Puyo. In the two-player co-op mode, there are four game types; 'Round', 'Normal', 'Doubt' and 'Block'.
Sonic the Hedgehog Spinball Original release dates: NA: November 23, 1993; EU: November 26, 1993; JP: December 10, 1993	Release years by system: 1993 – Mega Drive/Genesis; 1994 – Game Gear, Master System; 2007 – Wii Virtual Console; 2021 – Nintendo Switch
Sonic the Hedgehog Spinball Original release dates: NA: November 23, 1993; EU: November 26, 1993; JP: December 10, 1993	Notes: Titled simply Sonic Spinball in Japan, and in the Virtual Console release.
Dr. Robotnik's Mean Bean Machine Original release dates: NA: November 1993; EU: November 1993	Release years by system: 1993 – Game Gear, Mega Drive/Genesis; 1994 – Master System; 2006 – Wii Virtual Console; 2021 – Nintendo Switch
Dr. Robotnik's Mean Bean Machine Original release dates: NA: November 1993; EU: November 1993	Notes: Localization of Puyo Puyo, which also became Kirby's Avalanche on the Super Nintendo Entertainment System.
Tails' Skypatrol Original release date: JP: April 28, 1995	Release years by system: 1995 – Game Gear
Sonic Labyrinth Original release dates: EU: October 1995; JP: November 17, 1995; NA: November 1995	Release years by system: 1995 – Game Gear; 2013 – 3DS Virtual Console
Sonic Shuffle Original release dates: NA: November 13, 2000; JP: December 21, 2000; EU: March 9, 2001	Release years by system: 2000 – Dreamcast
Sonic Pinball Party Original release dates: NA: June 1, 2003; JP: July 17, 2003; EU: October 31, 2003	Release years by system: 2003 – Game Boy Advance
Sonic Battle Original release dates: JP: December 4, 2003; NA: January 5, 2004; EU: February 27, 2004	Release years by system: 2003 – Game Boy Advance
Sonic Chronicles: The Dark Brotherhood Original release dates: AU: September 25, 2008; EU: September 26, 2008; NA: September 30, 2008; JP: August 6, 2009	Release years by system: 2008 – Nintendo DS
Sonic Dash Original release date: WW: March 7, 2013	Release years by system: 2013 – Android, iOS; 2014 – Windows Phone
Sonic Jump Fever Original release date: WW: July 10, 2014	Release years by system: 2014 – Android, iOS
Sonic Runners Original release dates: JP: February 25, 2015; NA: June 25, 2015; EU: June 25, 2015	Release years by system: 2015 – Android, iOS
Sonic Boom Dash Original release dates: WW: October 8, 2015	Release years by system: 2015 – Android, iOS
Sonic Boom Dash Original release dates: WW: October 8, 2015	Notes: Based on the TV series Sonic Boom.; Originally titled Sonic Dash 2: Sonic Boom.
Sonic Runners Adventure Original release dates: UK: June 10, 2017; WW: August 9, 2017	Release years by system: 2017 – Java ME, Android, iOS
Sonic Forces Original release date: WW: September 2017	Release years by system: 2017 – Android, iOS
Sonic Forces Original release date: WW: September 2017	Notes: Originally titled Sonic Forces: Speed Battle as a tie-in to the console game Sonic Forces.
Sonic Speed Simulator Original release date(s): WW: April 13, 2022	Release years by system: 2022 – PC, Android, iOS, Xbox One
Sonic Speed Simulator Original release date(s): WW: April 13, 2022	Notes: Released on Roblox.
The Murder of Sonic the Hedgehog Original release date(s): WW: March 31, 2023	Release years by system: 2023 – PC, macOS
The Murder of Sonic the Hedgehog Original release date(s): WW: March 31, 2023	Notes: Surprise release as an April Fools' joke on the Steam Store.
Sonic Prime Dash Original release date(s): WW: July 6, 2023	Release years by system: 2023 – Android, iOS
Sonic Prime Dash Original release date(s): WW: July 6, 2023	Notes: A modified version of Sonic Dash based on the Netflix series Sonic Prime and available exclusively for Netflix members.
Sonic Blitz Original release date(s): PHI: June 2, 2025; BR: June 16, 2025	Release years by system: 2025 – Android, iOS
Sonic Blitz Original release date(s): PHI: June 2, 2025; BR: June 16, 2025	Notes: A digital collectible card game and later an action role-playing game developed by Rovio Entertainment; Was only soft launched as part of its development phase; the game was canceled in 2026
Sonic Rumble Party Original release date(s): WW: November 5, 2025	Release years by system: 2025 – Android, iOS, Microsoft Windows
Sonic Rumble Party Original release date(s): WW: November 5, 2025	Notes: Originally titled Sonic Rumble
Sonic Forces: Rival Rush Original release date(s): WW: October 7, 2026	Release years by system: 2026 – Nex Playground
Sonic Forces: Rival Rush Original release date(s): WW: October 7, 2026	Notes: A modified version of Sonic Forces (mobile game) for Nex Playground's Play Pass subscription
Sonic Pico Park Original release date(s): WW: November 12, 2026	Release years by system: 2026 – Nintendo Switch, Nintendo Switch 2, PlayStation 5, Xbox One, Xbox Series X/S, Windows
Sonic Pico Park Original release date(s): WW: November 12, 2026	Notes: Crossover with Pico Park

== Compilations ==
Game	Details
Sonic Classics 3 in 1 Original release dates: EU: 1995; NA: August 1997	Release years by system: 1995 – Mega Drive/Genesis
Sonic Classics 3 in 1 Original release dates: EU: 1995; NA: August 1997	Notes: Includes Sonic the Hedgehog, Sonic the Hedgehog 2, and Dr. Robotnik's Mean Bean Machine.; Titled Sonic Compilation in Europe.
Sonic & Knuckles Collection Original release dates: JP: February 14, 1997; NA: March 14, 1997; EU: March 20, 1997	Release years by system: 1997 – Windows
Sonic & Knuckles Collection Original release dates: JP: February 14, 1997; NA: March 14, 1997; EU: March 20, 1997	Notes: Includes Sonic the Hedgehog 3 and Sonic & Knuckles, as well as the combined Sonic 3 & Knuckles.; Also reissued in 1999 as the Sonic & Garfield Pack, with the addition of Garfield: Caught in the Act and Baku Baku Animal.; Publisher: Expert Software (in NA).
Sonic Jam Original release dates: JP: June 20, 1997; NA: July 31, 1997; EU: August 28, 1997	Release years by system: 1997 – Sega Saturn; 1998 – Game.com
Sonic Jam Original release dates: JP: June 20, 1997; NA: July 31, 1997; EU: August 28, 1997	Notes: Includes Sonic the Hedgehog, Sonic the Hedgehog 2, Sonic the Hedgehog 3, and Sonic & Knuckles.
Sonic Mega Collection Original release dates: NA: November 10, 2002; JP: December 18, 2002; EU: March 7, 2003	Release years by system: 2002 – GameCube; 2004 – PlayStation 2, Xbox; 2007 – Windows
Sonic Mega Collection Original release dates: NA: November 10, 2002; JP: December 18, 2002; EU: March 7, 2003	Notes: Includes Sonic the Hedgehog, Sonic the Hedgehog 2, Sonic the Hedgehog 3, Sonic & Knuckles, Sonic 3D Blast, Sonic Spinball, and Dr. Robotnik's Mean Bean Machine.; Includes three unlockable games that mimic the "lock-on technology" of Sonic & Knuckles: Blue Sphere, Knuckles in Sonic 2, and Sonic 3 & Knuckles.; Also includes four unlockable Genesis games unrelated to Sonic.; Released on the PlayStation 2, Xbox, and PC as Sonic Mega Collection Plus, which added six of the twelve Game Gear Sonic games: Sonic the Hedgehog, Sonic Chaos, Sonic Blast, Sonic Drift, Dr. Robotnik's Mean Bean Machine, and Sonic Labyrinth.
Sonic Gems Collection Original release dates: JP: August 11, 2005; NA: August 16, 2005; EU: September 30, 2005	Release years by system: 2005 – GameCube, PlayStation 2
Sonic Gems Collection Original release dates: JP: August 11, 2005; NA: August 16, 2005; EU: September 30, 2005	Notes: Includes Sonic CD, Sonic R, Sonic the Fighters, and six of the twelve Game Gear Sonic games: Sonic the Hedgehog 2, Sonic Triple Trouble, Tails Adventure, Sonic Drift 2, Sonic Spinball, and Tails' Skypatrol.; Also includes six unlockable Genesis games unrelated to Sonic.
Sonic's Ultimate Genesis Collection Original release date(s): NA: February 10, 2009; PAL: February 20, 2009	Release years by system: 2009 – PlayStation 3, Xbox 360
Sonic's Ultimate Genesis Collection Original release date(s): NA: February 10, 2009; PAL: February 20, 2009	Notes: Includes Sonic the Hedgehog, Sonic the Hedgehog 2, Sonic the Hedgehog 3, and Sonic & Knuckles.; Also includes over 40 other Sega Mega Drive/Genesis games.
Sonic PC Collection Original release dates: AU: October 1, 2009	Release years by system: 2009 – Windows
Sonic PC Collection Original release dates: AU: October 1, 2009	Notes: Includes Sonic Adventure DX: Director's Cut, Sonic Heroes, Sonic Riders, and Sonic Mega Collection Plus.
Sonic Classic Collection Original release dates: NA: March 2, 2010; AU: March 11, 2010; EU: March 12, 2010	Release years by system: 2010 – Nintendo DS
Sonic Classic Collection Original release dates: NA: March 2, 2010; AU: March 11, 2010; EU: March 12, 2010	Notes: Includes Sonic the Hedgehog, Sonic the Hedgehog 2, Sonic the Hedgehog 3, and Sonic & Knuckles.
Sonic Origins Original release date(s): WW: June 23, 2022	Release years by system: 2022 – PlayStation 4, PlayStation 5, Xbox One, Xbox Series X/S, Nintendo Switch, Windows
Sonic Origins Original release date(s): WW: June 23, 2022	Notes: Includes Sonic the Hedgehog, Sonic the Hedgehog 2, Sonic CD, and Sonic 3 & Knuckles.; An add-on by the name of Sonic Origins Plus was released in 2023, which added all twelve Game Gear Sonic games: Sonic the Hedgehog, Sonic the Hedgehog 2, Sonic Chaos, Sonic Triple Trouble, Tails Adventure, Sonic Blast, Sonic Drift, Sonic Drift 2, Sonic Spinball, Dr. Robotnik's Mean Bean Machine, Tails' Skypatrol, and Sonic Labyrinth.
Classic Sonic Collection Original release date(s): WW: October 20, 2026	Release years by system: 2026 – Nintendo Switch
Classic Sonic Collection Original release date(s): WW: October 20, 2026	Notes: Includes Sonic Mania, Sonic Origins, and Sonic Superstars.
Modern Sonic Collection Original release date(s): WW: October 20, 2026	Release years by system: 2026 – Nintendo Switch
Modern Sonic Collection Original release date(s): WW: October 20, 2026	Notes: Includes Sonic Forces, Sonic Colors: Ultimate, and Sonic Frontiers.

== Cancelled games ==
Game	Details
Sonic the Hedgehog Cancellation date: 1991	Proposed system release: 1991 – Amiga
Sonic the Hedgehog Cancellation date: 1991	Notes: A cancelled Amiga port of the original Sonic the Hedgehog released on the Genesis.
Sonic's Edusoft Cancellation date: 1991	Proposed system release: 1991 – Master System
Sonic's Edusoft Cancellation date: 1991	Notes: Educational game developed by Tiertex Design Studios.
SegaSonic Bros. Cancellation date: 1992	Proposed system release: 1992 – Arcade
SegaSonic Bros. Cancellation date: 1992	Notes: Failed location tests in 1992.; Puzzle game in which players assume different colored Sonics (blue, red, yellow).; Developed by Fukio Mitsuji.
Sister Sonic Cancellation date: 1993	Proposed system release: 1993 – Mega-CD/Sega CD
Sister Sonic Cancellation date: 1993	Notes: Attempted Sonic the Hedgehog rebrand of Popful Mail.
Sonic Crackers Cancellation date: 1994	Proposed system release: 1994 – Mega Drive/Genesis
Sonic Crackers Cancellation date: 1994	Notes: Also termed "Sonic Studium" and "Sonic Stadium". Eventually developed and released as Knuckles' Chaotix.
Sonic X-treme Cancellation date: 1997	Proposed system release: 1997 – Sega Saturn
Sonic Extreme Cancellation date: May 2003	Proposed system release: 2003 – Xbox
Sonic DS Cancellation date: 2004	Proposed system release: 2004 – Nintendo DS

== See also ==
- List of unofficial Sonic the Hedgehog media#Video games
- List of Sonic the Hedgehog characters
