= Sonic Rush Adventure =

2007 video game

- North American box art
- Developers: Dimps; Sonic Team
- Publisher: Sega
- Directors: Sakae Osumi; Yukihiro Higashi
- Producers: Akinori Nishiyama; Kouichi Sakita
- Designers: Masaaki Yamagiwa; Takayuki Sakamoto; Ayano Komatsu
- Programmers: Katsuya Kuramoto; Takaya Yamane; Chinami Ishizaki
- Artists: Yuji Uekawa; Kazuhiko Yamamoto
- Composers: Tomoya Ohtani; Seirou Okamoto; Mariko Nanba
- Series: Sonic the Hedgehog
- Platform: Nintendo DS
- Release: EU: September 13, 2007; NA: September 18, 2007; AU: September 27, 2007; JP: October 18, 2007
- Genres: Platform, action-adventure
- Modes: Single-player, multiplayer

Sonic Rush Adventure (Note: Japanese: ソニック ラッシュアドベンチャー, Hepburn: Sonikku Rasshu Adobenchā) is a 2007 platform game developed by Dimps and Sonic Team and published by Sega for the Nintendo DS. The sequel to 2005's Sonic Rush, it follows Sonic the Hedgehog and Tails, who are teleported to an alternate dimension and seek the help of Blaze the Cat, while battling a band of robot pirates. Gameplay is similar to prior installments in the Sonic the Hedgehog franchise, with players controlling Sonic or Blaze through a series of side-scrolling levels while collecting rings and defeating enemies. Sonic Rush Adventure deviates from prior games with its elements of sea travel, featuring boating minigames that take advantage of the DS's touchscreen.

The game was programmed using an updated version of its predecessor's game engine. The game was designed to make greater use of the DS's touchscreen and was inspired by various adventure-themed works. Although the majority of the game is played in 2D, character models and boss fights are rendered in full 3D. Sega released the game worldwide in September 2007 and in Japan in October 2007. Sonic Rush Adventure is also the first Sonic game published by Nintendo, which released the game in South Korea in 2009.

Sonic Rush Adventure received generally positive reviews. Critics highlighted its presentation, particularly the visuals, and music, and some favorably compared the gameplay to that of the original Sega Genesis Sonic titles. Primary criticism was directed at the game's replay value (regarded as weak) and story (regarded as long and boring). Overall, reviewers felt it was a worthy addition to the Sonic franchise and a solid sequel to Sonic Rush, but also believed it innovated too little.

== Gameplay ==
Gameplay screenshot showing Sonic running around a loop in the game's first level.

Sonic Rush Adventure is a platform game similar in gameplay and style to the original 2005 Sonic Rush. As in the original, players control Sonic the Hedgehog or Blaze the Cat, whose goal is to collect the Chaos Emeralds and their alternate-dimensional counterparts, the Sol Emeralds, and defeat a nefarious band of robot pirates. Like the original, Sonic and Blaze attack by jumping and spinning, can perform a speed boost using a Tension Gauge (which is filled when they perform tricks in mid-air or defeat robot enemies), collect rings as a form of health, and power-ups such as elemental shields and invincibility. The gameplay is split into seven levels, each of which contains three parts: two normal levels; and a boss fight. In normal levels, players must reach the treasure chest at the end of the stage, while using features such as springboards and boost pads, and avoiding obstacles such as robots, spikes, and bottomless pits. In boss fights, players must defeat a large robot by jumping on its vulnerable spot to deplete its health meter. When completing a level, players are given a grade based on their performance; an "S" rank is the best, while a "C" is the worst. Both of the DS's screens are used to display the play area, with the player's character moving between them as necessary.

The game's setting is an archipelago of an alternate dimension from that of Sonic's. The main island of the archipelago is Southern Island, which houses the village that serves as a headquarters for Sonic and the others, known as Windmill Village. The player begins each adventure from Windmill Village on Southern Island. Players can plot their routes to each level using the DS's stylus and travel to one of the islands using one of the four ships, each of which uses a different touchscreen-controlled minigame. Ships can be built using materials that are earned by completing levels. On different areas of Southern Island, players can talk to members of Marine's Coconut Crew, who will offer Sonic tips and additional missions as the story progresses. The game features 100 of these missions, with objectives such as completing a stage within a time limit or defeating a boss with only one ring. Certain missions must be finished to progress through the story, while others offer bonus rewards upon completion, such as musical tracks the player can listen to or visual upgrades to Southern Island. At Marine's house, players can talk to Marine to initiate missions, have Tails build new ships and equipment using materials gathered from stages to advance the story, or engage in multiplayer battles using DS Download Play or Nintendo Wi-Fi Connection.

By deviating from the recommended objective on the Sea Chart, players can find hidden islands to explore and earn additional materials, as well as run into a robot pirate named Johnny. Finding Johnny will trigger a race between him and Sonic, with the player receiving one of the seven Chaos Emeralds if they are victorious. Blaze can earn Sol Emeralds by completing a series of special missions. If the player has reached the normal ending and collected all the Chaos and Sol Emeralds, an extended ending, featuring an extra boss, will be unlocked.

== Plot ==
On a stormy night, Sonic and Tails set out in Tails' biplane, the Tornado, after it detects a powerful energy signal. During their flight, the Tornado is struck by lightning and gets sucked into a tornado, knocking Sonic and Tails out. They awaken on a remote island and meet the energetic raccoon Marine, who longs to be a sailor. Sonic sets off to explore the island for shipbuilding materials, as Tails starts to work on Marine's ship. Sonic returns and discovers the smaller, faster waterbike that Tails and Marine have made. While exploring the surrounding islands to test the waterbike, they soon encounter a band of pirates led by the robotic Captain Whisker, who are after an ancient artifact known as the Jeweled Scepter. As Sonic attempts to stop Whisker from retrieving the Scepter, Blaze suddenly appears; she reveals to them that they have accidentally traveled to her dimension during the storm, and that she has been attempting to stop the pirates for some time. Whisker manages to escape with the Scepter, so Blaze and Sonic agree to work together and retrieve it.

After searching, the group locates the pirates' hidden fortress and confront Captain Whisker and his first mate, Johnny. As the two are defeated, they attempt to escape to return the scepter to their true leader, while Marine goes after them on her own. However, the pirates overpower her and take her hostage on their ship. Giving chase, Sonic and Blaze attack and defeat Whisker's strongest robot, the Ghost Titan, causing an explosion that sinks the ship. In the aftermath, Marine reveals she took back the Jeweled Scepter in the confusion, and Blaze returns the relic to its proper resting place.

In the extended ending, the scepter is stolen again, and the heroes track down the thief, discovering it to be the pirates' creators, Doctor Eggman and his alternate-dimensional counterpart Eggman Nega. The two use the scepter to strengthen their giant mech, planning to turn Blaze's world into Eggmanland. Using the Chaos and Sol Emeralds, Sonic and Blaze transform into Super Sonic and Burning Blaze respectively, and battle the doctors. Over Eggman's protests, Eggman Nega tries to destroy Blaze's planet as a last resort, but he is distracted by Marine, giving Sonic the final blow to destroy the mech. Tails builds a craft that uses the power of both sets of Emeralds, and Sonic and Blaze promise to one day meet again. As Sonic and Tails set sail, Marine appears on her new boat, thanking Sonic and Tails and promising she will study to become a captain. The three say their final goodbyes as Sonic and Tails fly off for home.

== Development and release ==
Like its predecessor, Sonic Rush Adventure was developed by Dimps with assistance from Sonic Team for the Nintendo DS. It was developed alongside Sonic Rivals 2 for the PlayStation Portable. As the developers began to work on the project, director Sakae Osumi, inspired by adventure novels, television programs, and films, decided that the sequel should be set on the high seas. As the original Rush centered around Blaze coming to Sonic's world, the writers decided to make the sequel center around Sonic and Tails becoming stranded in Blaze's world. Wondering who would meet the two first in this dimension and what would inspire their adventure, the designers created the character Marine. They also chose to give her an Australian accent, to make her have a sense of being loud and active. The developers also created the nefarious pirates, who serve as primary antagonists.

In programming the game, the team used the same underlying technology used to create Sonic Rush. However, the developers enhanced the presentation, including a dynamic camera system and 3D elements in gameplay, most notably in boss fights. The game also makes greater use of the DS's touchscreen, featuring sea-travel minigames using the touchscreen, in addition to a new tutorial system. The musical score of Sonic Rush Adventure was composed by Tomoya Ohtani, Seirou Okamoto, and Mariko Nanba. The sound director was Teruhiko Nakagawa, who recruited the voice actors and made all the sound effects. The composers sought to preserve the style of music present in the original Rush while adapting to the game's theme of adventure; it also features elements of tropical and hip hop music.

Sega first announced Sonic Rush Adventure on April 16, 2007, and revealed more information about it the following month. A demo version was playable at the Electronic Entertainment Expo (E3) in July 2007. Sonic Rush Adventure was first released in Europe on September 13, 2007, followed by North America on September 18, Australia on September 27, and Japan on October 18. It was released in South Korea on September 17, 2009. Sega published the game in all regions except South Korea, where Nintendo handled publishing. This makes Sonic Rush Adventure the first Sonic game published by Nintendo. To promote the title, Sega created an Adobe Flash browser game that allowed users to demo the boating minigames.

The game originally received a 12+ rating from PEGI. This was due to the occasional use of "bugger" in the dialogue, which is a curse word in the United Kingdom. The game was given a new 3+ rating after this word was removed from the UK release.

== Reception ==
Reception

Aggregate score
| Aggregator | Score |
|---|---|
| Metacritic | 78/100 |

Review scores
| Publication | Score |
|---|---|
| Eurogamer | 8/10 |
| GameSpot | 8/10 |
| GameSpy | 4/5 |
| IGN | 8/10 |
| Nintendo Power | 9/10 |
| Nintendo World Report | 8.5/10 |

According to review aggregation website Metacritic, Sonic Rush Adventure received "generally favorable" reviews. The game was released in the wake of the 2006 Sonic the Hedgehog reboot, which was critically derided; GamesRadar stated that Rush Adventure was indication that the series still had some life in it.

The visuals and presentation were praised. IGN admired the improvements made to the original's graphics and effects, and noted the fluid character animations and attention to detail. The game made good use of the DS's capabilities, according to GameSpot, with transitions between 2D and 3D making the levels more exciting. Nintendo World Report agreed: they wrote that the graphics were smooth and considered it a good selling point. The 3D visuals, GameSpy stated, evoked memories of the classic Sega Genesis Sonic games and did not distract from the experience. IGN, however, made note of frame rate problems during the "messy" boss fights, even though GameSpot called them "a spectacle" and "remarkable". The music was also viewed positively; reviewers praised its upbeat, hip hop-style soundtrack as catchy and well-produced.

Many critics favorably compared the gameplay to the original Genesis games. According to the Official Nintendo Magazine, the game reminded them what made Sonic great in the first place, and called it a "a consummate experience". Nintendo World Report praised its varied level environments, and praised their large, non-linear design. They also spoke positively of the tricks system, making the game more lively. The boating minigames, wrote Pocket Gamer, "opens up the game beyond the simple platforming" that restricted previous Sonic titles, and used the DS's abilities well. IGN was pleased that the game continued the same gameplay of the original Sonic Rush, and called it a worthy successor.

Some critics felt that the game innovated too little from the original. GameSpot felt Sonic Rush Adventure did not contribute to an overall improvement to Sonic Rush, although they still called it a "mighty-fine" platformer that would satisfy Sonic fans. IGN agreed, writing that it did not make as much of an impact since it simply recycled many of the original Rush's mechanics. The game's plot was not well received. According to Nintendo World Report, who expressed relief the cutscenes could be skipped, the story was tedious, slow, and uninteresting; this was a sentiment echoed by GameSpot. IGN thought the story was fun, but was too reliant on dialogue. The replay value polarized critics. Nintendo World Report wrote that the material collecting system was artificial and forced, and felt it "dampened" playability. Also noting this was GameSpot and Eurogamer, who called it repetitive and tedious, respectively.

Of the game as a whole, Nintendo Power called Sonic Rush Adventure a "top notch" game in the Sonic series. IGN felt it was definitely a game worth buying and that it offered good design ideas. According to Games Master, the game was a reminder of why Sonic has lasted as long, calling the title "fast, frantic and, most importantly, fun".

== Legacy ==
Sonic Colours (DS) is often considered to be a spiritual sequel to Sonic Rush Adventure, and an unofficial 'Sonic Rush 3'. Marine has become a recurring Sonic franchise character since her debut, appearing mostly in spin-offs. She has appeared as a playable character in Sonic Dash, Sonic Prime Dash, Sonic Forces (Mobile), Sonic Rumble Party, Sonic Speed Simulator, and Sonic Blitz, and has had cameos and direct mentions in various other Sonic games. Marine has also starred in Sonic extended media, such as comic books. Marine was a highly requested character for the roster of Sonic Racing: CrossWorlds, and received mentions within Blaze's dialogue in the Japanese script.
