= Sonic Boom Dash =

- Developer: Hardlight
- Publisher: Sega
- Series: Sonic the Hedgehog
- Engine: Unity
- Release: iOS; October 8, 2015; Android; October 15, 2015
- Genre: Endless runner
- Mode: Single-player

Sonic Boom Dash (formerly known as Sonic Dash 2: Sonic Boom) is a 2015 endless runner mobile game developed by Hardlight and published by Sega. It is the sequel to Sonic Dash (2013) and is based on the Sonic Boom spin-off franchise of the Sonic the Hedgehog series. It was released in October 2015 for iOS and Android.

== Gameplay ==
Sonic Boom Dash is an endless runner that retains the core gameplay of its predecessor; players control a character who automatically runs through continuously generated 3D courses while moving between three lanes to collect Rings and orbs, avoid obstacles and enemies, and travel as far as possible. Like Sonic Dash, the game uses swiping controls for actions such as jumping, rolling, and changing lanes, while Rings provide protection from certain hazards and can be used as currency. The game also retains the Dash mechanic, allowing characters to temporarily move at high speed through obstacles after charging the Dash meter.

Sonic Boom Dash introduces Team Play, allowing players to run with up to three characters and switch between them at Junctions, which also allow Rings to be banked and routes to be changed. The Enerbeam lets players tilt their device to swing along rails, while each playable character has a unique ability, such as Amy's hammer attack and Knuckles' slam. Players can also collect and equip Sprites, which provide additional abilities and can be upgraded or evolved. The levels and characters are based on the Sonic Boom television series, giving the game new environments and obstacles while maintaining the basic endless-running structure of Sonic Dash.

The game features only a small selection of playable characters: the game initially featured only Sonic, Tails, Knuckles, Amy, and Sticks; Shadow was added in December 2015; Vector was added in 2021.

== Development and release ==
Sonic Boom Dash spent a year in development and was initially soft launched for Android in Canada on July 1, 2015. The game was later announced for worldwide release on October 2, and was released for iOS on October 8 alongside an Apple Watch companion app. The game was globally released for Android on October 15. The game was originally titled Sonic Dash 2: Sonic Boom before being shortened to Sonic Boom Dash in 2026.

== Reception ==
Reception

Aggregate score
Aggregator	Score
Metacritic	iOS: 60/100

Review scores
Publication	Score
Pocket Gamer	3.5/5
Gamezebo	90/100
Multiplayer.it	6.0
Trusted Reviews	2.5/5

Like its prequel, Sonic Boom Dash has received "mixed or average reviews" according to review aggregator Metacritic. Pocket Gamer's Harry Slater praised the game as a polished and entertaining endless runner that builds on simple controls and character abilities, despite its lack of originality. Gamezebo's Nadia Oxford praised the game for improving on its predecessor with new characters, mechanics, and gameplay variety, while noting that its free-to-play-elemnts could be frustrating. Multiplayer.it's Tommaso Pugliese praised the game for its simple gameplay, precise control, and technical presentation, but criticized its lack of originality and limited improvements over its predecessor.
