= Sonic Dream Team =

2023 video game

- App Store icon
- Developer: Hardlight
- Publisher: Sega
- Directors: Paul Twynholm; Dan Rossati
- Artist: Simon Dew
- Writers: Dan Rossati; Ian Flynn
- Composers: Michiel van den Bos; Tee Lopes; Jonny Atma
- Series: Sonic the Hedgehog
- Engine: Unity
- Platform: iOS IPadOS macOS tvOS
- Release: December 5, 2023
- Genre: Platform
- Mode: Single-player

Sonic Dream Team is a 2023 platformer developed by Hardlight and published by Sega. An installment in the Sonic the Hedgehog series, it was released on iOS, macOS and tvOS through Apple Arcade on December 5, 2023. The game follows Sonic, Tails, Knuckles, Amy Rose, Rouge and Cream traversing across Reverie Haven which is corrupted by Doctor Eggman—using a mysterious device protected by a guardian named Ariem—to stop him. As one of the six characters, the player will collect Dream Orbs by completing a series of missions across multiple stages. Every character, each with their own unique abilities, can be unlocked to the player after collecting enough Dream Orbs. The multi-character aspect of the game marks a return to similar 3D gameplay first in Sonic Adventure (1998) and Sonic Heroes (2003).

Dream Team's dream world was created as a result of shaping the game's narrative around bringing back Cream, wanting it to feel like a natural reason why she would be put in harm's way. The game itself was shaped around the idea of being in an exhilarating state of flow, with levels being designed to emulate rollercoasters and half pipes. The game was developed in under 2 years and is the first 3D Sonic game on mobile. Hardlight had previously worked on other Sonic mobile titles such as Sonic Jump (2012), Sonic Dash (2013) and Sonic Forces: Speed Battle (2017).

Sonic Dream Team received a generally positive reception for its gameplay and visuals, although it received criticism for its story and short length. The game is expected to receive several content updates, with the first one released on February 14, 2024. A fifth update was released in December 2024 which added Shadow the Hedgehog to the game and a sixth update featuring a mini campaign for the character was released in March 2025.

== Gameplay ==
Sonic Dream Team is a 3D platformer which follows Sonic the Hedgehog and his friends through various worlds taking place inside of Doctor Eggman's dreams. The game initially features six playable characters; Sonic, Amy Rose, Tails, Cream the Rabbit, Knuckles the Echidna and Rouge the Bat. After completing certain tasks, Shadow can be unlocked as a seventh playable character. In addition to performing homing attacks and using the boost gauge, Sonic and Amy can Air Dash and Light Dash through rows of rings, Tails and Cream can fly for short periods of time, and Knuckles and Rouge can glide and climb up walls. Shadow's homing attack is replaced with an aimable Chaos Shift, and he can also use Chaos Control to slow down time. Players can switch between available characters in order to use their abilities to reach areas of each level others can't.

The main campaign features 4 worlds that are each broken down into 3 acts, which are further broken down into 1 open-ended exploration level and 6 action levels that utilize different characters. In order to progress through the story, the player must collect the Dream Orbs scattered throughout the levels and defeat the boss of each world. Following the release of Update 2, a fifth world was added called Sweet Dreams, which features 4 acts with 4 levels each, as well as a final "experts only" level known as Bittersweet Way. Sweet Dreams uses a separate collectible known as Dream Moons and introduces mechanics not seen in the main campaign. Additional items can unlock bonus content such as collectible statues, jukebox tracks, and special powers that can be equipped at the start of a level.

Another mode is Tails' Challenges, which involve short daily missions that grant experience points for two unlockable item tracks (the main Tails track and a shorter Shadow track).

The game features both touch screen controls and controller support.

== Plot ==
Doctor Eggman discovers an ancient relic called the Reverie, an object with dream-controlling powers that allows the pure of heart to bring their dreams into reality. Eggman, wanting to use this power for his own gain, steals the Reverie and kidnaps Cream the Rabbit and her Chao pet Cheese to use as a filter to access the relic's power. Eggman activates the Reverie upon which its guardian seals Eggman inside his own dreams before he can do any harm to reality. Sonic, Tails, Knuckles, Amy Rose and Rouge arrive at the scene to try and rescue Cream and Cheese, to which the guardian also sends everyone to sleep and as a result enter Eggman's dreams. Upon awakening in the dream world, known as Reverie Haven, Sonic meets the Guardian of the Reverie and Dreamweaver, Ariem. Ariem asks Sonic to collect Dream Orbs for her so that she can restore Sonic's friends and reclaim Reverie Haven from the dreamscapes Eggman has constructed.

After traveling through Scrambled Shores, Dream Factory, and Nightmare Maze, a monster known as the Guardian Hunter ambushes Ariem in an attempt to capture her for Eggman. It is promptly defeated by either Knuckles or Rouge, but Ariem is severely wounded by the encounter. The heroes then pass through Ego City, a dystopian imperial capital intended to be brought into the real world, before reaching the Dream Core at the center of the Reverie. The wounded Ariem, unable to directly reach the Dream Core to banish Eggman, transforms into a small orb which the heroes intend to carry. Guarding the Dream Core is Nightmare Eggman, a twisted version of the doctor with reality-warping abilities. Tails flies up to the Core to receive Ariem, while the others race through the void, passing Ariem to each other in a relay race in order to reach Tails at the top of the Core's tower. After reaching the top of the spire, Nightmare Eggman raises the tower higher and attempts to crush all 6 heroes simultaneously, but Tails launches Sonic onto a nearby platform, who races up the side of the tower and tosses Ariem into the Core. She is immediately restored to full health, banishes Eggman, and activates the Dormancy Protocol, which will shut the Reverie's dream-manipulation down for a millennium. When the heroes awaken and reunite, they begin to make plans for a victory dinner. Eggman awakens as well, but Cream sends Cheese to press a button on his machine's console, sending him back to sleep. Tails then reveals to a saddened Cream that he programmed a back-end into the Dream Core that will allow her to visit Ariem at any time, as well as allowing for the others to explore the remaining dreamscapes.

== Development ==
According to Creative Director Dan Rossati, the intention of the gameplay was to "make a game that allowed players to get into an exhilarating flow state", comparing playing the game to, "skate parks and bobsled runs with rounded corners" that is designed to maintain the player's flow as they run through each of the zones.

The announcement trailer was released on November 1, 2023, with the music composed by Tee Lopes. A subsequent trailer with the game's opening animation was released on November 22, 2023, with animation by Powerhouse Animation. It was released for Apple Arcade subscribers on December 5, 2023, on iOS, macOS and tvOS.

Sega confirmed that Dream Team would be getting three major updates in a similar vein to Sonic Frontiers (2022), with the first one released on February 14, 2024, adding time trials and overhauling the boss fights. The second and third updates (April 17th and June 12th respectively) unlocked the Sweet Dreams world, as well as features such as the Jukebox and a ranking system. A surprise fourth update, released on September 14th, 2024, introduced unlockable powers, as well as new jukebox tracks and special "Fractured Dreams" levels in Tails' Challenges. Shadow the Hedgehog was added as a playable character in an update released in December 18, 2024, in celebration of the Year of Shadow.

== Reception ==
Reception

Aggregate score
Aggregator	Score
Metacritic	75/100 (iOS)

Review scores
Publication	Score
Destructoid	6/10
Digital Trends	3.5/5
IGN	8/10
TouchArcade	4/5

Award
Publication	Award
Develop: Star Awards	Best Mobile Game (2024)

According to the review aggregate website Metacritic, Sonic Dream Team received "generally favorable reviews" based on 9 reviews.

AppTrigger said it is the game that "3D Sonic fans have been waiting for a long time". Several reviewers praised its aesthetics, engaging goals and game feel, while also calling the story "bland" and the game very short.

In 2024, Sonic Dream Team was the 6th most-downloaded game on Apple Arcade.
