= Crazy Taxi: City Rush =

2014 video game

- Developer: Hardlight
- Publisher: Sega
- Engine: Unity
- Platforms: iOS, Android
- Release: March 13, 2014
- Genres: Racing, action
- Mode: Single-player

Crazy Taxi: City Rush is a free-to-play racing video game developed by Hardlight and published by Sega for iOS and Android.

== Gameplay ==
In Crazy Taxi: City Rush, the players do not have a direct control of the vehicle's speed. The road is split into multiple lanes, with swipe controls being used to trigger a lane switch. By touching the left or right side of the screen, the taxi will take a turn if it appears on a crossroad. In order to earn in-game cash currency, the players have a choice between story missions and side jobs. The main objective in most of them is to pick up a certain person and deliver them safely to their destination before the time limit expires. All cars in-game have different handling and speed stats, and can be upgraded and painted on at any time. After the players make an initial selection of the driver and vehicle, City Rush will initiate a tutorial with a purpose of teaching the control scheme.

== Development ==
Kenji Kanno, the creator of the Crazy Taxi series, thought that the format was perfect for the short attention span of people who played mobile games. He thought that City Rush needed to be completely suitable for mobile platforms, which caused the development to start from scratch. The idea was to focus on the simplicity and the casual elements that the original games had. Kanno approached Hardlight as they were finishing the development on Sonic Dash. They developed a prototype, with initial concept designed by Kanno as the foundation. Throughout the development, the team met with Kanno several times discussing different aspects of the game, such as the main structure, pacing of the missions, players' progression and music being used. Hardlight had multiple different iteration of the control system before settling down on the tap and swipe model, caused by the lack of a physical input. Because there was a shift from consoles to a mobile game powered by Unity engine, they were forced to make some radical changes, such as the removal of the open-world feature.

Sega ended development on Crazy Taxi: City Rush on March 24, 2021.

== Reception ==
Reception

Aggregate score
Aggregator	Score
Metacritic	63/100

Review scores
Publication	Score
Gamezebo	3.5/5
Pocket Gamer	3/5
TouchArcade	3.5/5

On its release, Crazy Taxi: City Rush was met with "mixed or average" reviews from critics, with an aggregate score of 63/100 on Metacritic.
