= Freefall Racers =

2013 video game

- Cover art on Xbox 360 Marketplace
- Developer: Smoking Gun Interactive
- Publisher: Deep Silver
- Platforms: Xbox 360, Nex Playground
- Release: September 6, 2013
- Genre: Racing
- Modes: Single-player, Multiplayer

Freefall Racers is a flying-racing video game developed by Vancouver-based studio Smoking Gun Interactive and published by Deep Silver. The game was released on September 6, 2013, worldwide for the Xbox 360. An enhanced port was released for the Nex Playground on July 22, 2026.

== Gameplay ==
The player controls a squirrel from a third-person perspective, and the player can choose from a variety of different cars to race with. The game uses augmented reality to allow players to interact with the game via Microsoft's Kinect.

A still from the game, featuring one of the playable squirrels

The game's tracks are divided into a number of different sections, each with its own unique challenges. Some sections require the player to race through tight spaces, while others require them to jump over obstacles or make sharp turns. The player must also be careful not to fall off the track, as this will result in an instant death.

Freefall Racers features a variety of different game modes, including a single-player campaign, a multiplayer mode, and a time trial mode. In the single-player campaign, the player must race against a series of computer-controlled opponents in order to progress through the game. The multiplayer mode allows players to compete against each other either online or offline. The time trial mode allows players to race against the clock in order to set the fastest time.

== Reception ==
Reception

Aggregate score
Aggregator	Score
Metacritic	57/100

Review scores
Publication	Score
GamesMaster	6/10
Official Xbox Magazine (US)	6/10
Vandal	5/10

Freefall Racers received "mixed or average" reviews according to review aggregator Metacritic.

Mark B. for Diehard GameFan stated that "Freefall Racers is just fine for the price point, and anyone who enjoys combat racing or Kinect games should absolutely check this out, as it's a solid entry that fans of either will enjoy."

GamesMaster rated the game 6/10 in the magazine, stating that the game is "Essentially SSX for kids but without the snowboard."

The Official Xbox Magazine rated the game 6/10 in their magazine, stating that "The outdoors tracks are vibrantly colored and interestingly designed, and send you speeding along at an impressive clip. But while it looks like a second cousin to the Ice Age films, Freefall Racers is utterly devoid of personality, and it's also rather slight, with just eight tracks split between a handful of drab cups and no real long-lasting pull in sight."

José Manuel for Vandal rated the game 5/10, stating that "Freefall Racers is a perfect example of what Kinect has meant in this generation, a technological marvel from which it has not been possible to take full advantage as it could. This is a good idea that has led to a fun, but excessively simple, and short game that only the little ones will enjoy, or if we are with a friend at home."
