= Sonic Utopia =

Upcoming fan game

- Series: Sonic the Hedgehog (unofficial)
- Genre: Platform
- Mode: Single-player

Sonic Utopia is an upcoming platform game based on Sega's Sonic the Hedgehog franchise. An early demo was released on October 23, 2016, showcasing the physics and gameplay.

== Gameplay ==
Sonic Utopia is a 3D open world platform game that plays similarly to official entries in the Sonic series. In the demo, the player controls Sonic in an open-world version of Green Hill Zone. Per usual, Sonic can run, jump, and attack by rolling into a ball. He can also perform the spin dash, homing attack, and super peel-out. Monitors, rings and badniks function the same as the classic Sonic games. Given the game is currently a showcase, there is currently no end.

== Development ==
Sonic Utopia was initially developed by a small team of Sonic fans: The Great Lange, Murasaki Fox, Tpot, and PicsAndPixels. The Great Lange served as the director, main developer, modeler, animator, and musician. The game is powered by an engine that was created by Murasaki. An early demo of the game was released in October 2016.

In 2024, The Great Lange wrote on X that the game is still in development under new ownership.

== Reception ==
=== Pre-release ===
Ollie Barder of Forbes wrote that Sonic Utopia is an exciting example of what a vibrant, open-world 3D Sonic game could be, praising its free-form gameplay, colorful visual style, and the team behind it, while hoping Sega takes notices and creates more Sonic games with a similar approach.
