= Sonic Pico Park =

- Developer: Tecopark
- Publisher: Tecopark
- Producer: Takashi Iizuka
- Series: Sonic the Hedgehog
- Platforms: Nintendo Switch; Nintendo Switch 2; PlayStation 5; Xbox One; Xbox Series X/S; Windows
- Release: 12 November 2026
- Genre: Puzzle
- Mode: Multiplayer

Sonic Pico Park is a 2026 puzzle video game developed and published by Tecopark. A sequel to Pico Park 2, it is a crossover between Tecopark's Pico Park and Sega's Sonic the Hedgehog series. It released for video game consoles and Windows computers on 12 November 2026.

== Gameplay ==
Sonic Pico Park is a cooperative video game where the players control characters from the Sonic the Hedgehog series. Player characters include Sonic the Hedgehog, Tails, Knuckles the Echidna, Amy Rose, Shadow the Hedgehog, Cream the Rabbit, Big the Cat, Silver the Hedgehog, Blaze the Cat, Rouge the Bat, E-123 Omega, Espio the Chameleon, Charmy Bee and Vector the Crocodile. Similar to the previous Pico Park games, the players engage with platforming and puzzle sequences.

== Development and release ==
Sonic Pico Park was developed by Pico Park creator Tecopark. It was announced in June 2026 during the Summer Game Fest event. It is part of Sonic the Hedgehog's 35th anniversary. It was released on 12 November 2026 for Nintendo Switch, Nintendo Switch 2, PlayStation 5, Xbox One, Xbox Series X/S, and Windows via Steam. It also supports Xbox Play Anywhere on Windows, Xbox One, and Xbox Series X/S.

== Reception ==
Reception

Aggregate scores
Aggregator	Score
Metacritic	83/100 (PC) (Note: Based on 4 reviews); 78/100 (PS5) (Note: Based on 7 reviews)
OpenCritic	88% recommend (Note: Based on 17 reviews)

Review scores
Publication	Score
Nintendo Life	7/10
Shacknews	8/10
Siliconera	8/10
Multiplayer.it	7.0/10
