= Sonic Jump Fever =

2014 vertical platform game

- App icon
- Developer: Hardlight
- Publisher: Sega
- Series: Sonic the Hedgehog
- Platforms: iOS, Android
- Release: WW: 10 July 2014
- Genre: Platform
- Mode: multiplayer mode

Sonic Jump Fever was a 2014 vertical platform game developed by British studio Hardlight. It was the sequel to Sonic Jump. The game was made available for iOS and Android systems on 10 July 2014.

Sonic Jump Fever is no longer available to download on the Google Play Store as of late 2018.

== Gameplay ==
the tutorial beginning of the game.

The gameplay is similar to that of the previous Sonic Jump title. The objective of the game is to navigate a vertical course as high as possible. The player tilts their device to move the character left and right, and can tap the screen to perform a double jump. Hitting opponents from below destroys them and scores the player points. Unlike the original Sonic Jump, Fever focuses on competitive multiplayer. The game contains a leaderboard displayed before each round showing players the high scores of other players. These leaderboard scores reset twice a week to encourage competitive play.

== Reception ==
Reception

Aggregate score
| Aggregator | Score |
|---|---|
| Metacritic | 54/100 |

Review scores
| Publication | Score |
|---|---|
| Gamezebo | 3.5/5 |
| Pocket Gamer | 2.5/5 |
| TouchArcade | 2/5 |

Sonic Jump Fever received an aggregated review score of 54 on Metacritic, indicating "mixed or average reviews". Carter Dotson of Gamezebo gave the game a positive review, praising the game having a faster structure than Sonic Jump and the game's monetization, saying "the game is surprisingly good about the money it encourages players to spend" and that it can be played cheaply, while criticizing the game's repetitiveness though noting that the game was good to play in short periods, and complaining that the playable character can sometimes blend into the background. Pocket Gamer's Harry Slater gave a negative review, saying that the game was not as fun as the original game, and that any part of the game that was not the jumping was unnecessary. Shaun Musgrave of TouchArcade was negative, complaining about the game's advertisements and the time it takes for the stage to change, noting that the game was worse than Sonic Jump, though praising the game's fever mechanic, graphics, and the speed of its gameplay.
