= Pico Park =

2016 puzzle game

- Developer: TECOPARK
- Designer: Teco
- Programmer: Teco
- Artist: Teco
- Composer: TADOSUKE
- Platforms: Microsoft Windows; Nintendo Switch
- Release: Microsoft Windows; 2016; Nintendo Switch; June 8, 2019
- Genres: Action, Casual, Indie
- Mode: Co-op mode

Pico Park is a cooperative multiplayer, action-puzzle independent game developed by Japanese developer TECOPARK. The initial release of Pico Park for Microsoft Windows was in 2016 via video game retailer Steam, featuring local multiplayer gameplay. It was formerly named Picollecitta but was changed to Pico Park because the former was "hard to remember". On June 8, 2019, Pico Park was released for Nintendo Switch. In 2021, the game was updated to add online multiplayer features to allow gameplay through an internet connection.

The game offers three game modes: "World", "Endless", and "Battle". In "World" mode, game progression is based on the completion of puzzles; in "Endless" mode, the main goal is to obtain a high score; in "Battle" mode, players compete against each other instead of cooperating.

Pico Park won the "Best Presentation" award in Sense of Wonder Night 2014.

A sequel, Pico Park 2, was released for Nintendo Switch on August 27, 2024, and for PC, Xbox One, and Xbox Series X/S on September 12. A third game, Sonic Pico Park, which features characters and elements from Sega's Sonic the Hedgehog franchise, is scheduled for release on November 12, 2026.

== Gameplay ==
Pico Park is a cooperative local/online multiplayer action puzzle game for 2 to 8 players (2 to 10 players in the classic version). The goal of the game is to get a key and unlock the locked door at the end of the map. Players need to cooperate to reach the objective, but players also have the ability to prevent reaching this goal, for example by blocking other players' movement.

=== Game modes ===
- Local Play Mode - Players can play together locally on one computer. Each player uses their own controller to control their character in the game.
- Online Play Mode - Players can play together online with other players via an internet connection. Because of the importance of communication in the game, an instant messaging and/or VoIP program such as Discord, TeamSpeak, Skype, etc. is recommended when playing. There is also a limited quick messaging system within the game.
- World Mode - Each level of Pico Park is completed after all players enter the door. Players must retrieve the key first for unlocking the door to enter it. There are 12 sets of levels in this mode, each having 4 levels, for a total of 48 levels.
  - The 12 sets are:
    1. Hello Pico Park - Standard platformer levels.
    2. Go together - All players are connected to each other by a rope, causing the movement of any one player to affect all other players.
    3. Time limit - Players have a limited amount of time to complete each level.
    4. Gimmick - Each character has a special function. Each level has as different style, such as a level that mimics Flappy Bird.
    5. All for one (only available to play in offline mode) - Players have alternating control over the character on screen.
    6. Push or jump - To win this theme, players must focus on jumping and pushing objects to complete the mission.
    7. Move and stop - Walking or moving will affect the completion of the level.
    8. Retro game - Each level is composed of a retro game such as Tetris.
    9. Ball park - Balls are introduced to the levels.
    10. Two players - The levels are played by two players at a time, who must help each other to complete the mission. If the first two players are successful, the control is given to the next two players in a cycle.
    11. Hand gimmick - Each character is equipped with a gun that can suck or absorb another character.
    12. Last park - This theme is the combination of all the previous levels with more difficult gimmicks added to it.
- Battle Mode - Adds competitive gameplay.
  1. Height battle - The players compete to jump the highest in the allotted time.
  2. Region battle - Players need to hit a ball into another player's territory, capturing some of that territory. The player with the most territory at the end wins the game.
  3. Jump battle - Players need to jump to dodge an incoming cannonball. If the ball hits the player, they die. The last player standing wins.
  4. Stop watch battle - Whoever presses the button closest to 0.01 seconds wins.
- Endless Mode - Players can play endless mode to achieve high scores through cooperation with other players.
  1. Endless jump - Every player has to dodge the ball for the score to keep increase. If the ball hits any of the players, the score will reset.
  2. Endless puzzle - This mode is played like co-op Tetris, but every player helps to build in the same block.
  3. Endless scroll - This mode is played like Flappy Bird, but multiple people need to dodge the obstacle.
  4. Endless plane - Players need to control a plane so it does not hit any walls, and every player is connected by one string, so one cannot go too far from the others.

== Development and release ==
Developer logo

When asked what made him start making Pico Park, the game creator, Teco, answered, "I think it's fun for [friends] to get together and play on one screen," but that he thinks local gameplay has become less common with time. Teco developed the game by himself and his friend helped to compose sounds in the game. This game was inspired by Saturn Bomberman, in which 10 players are able to play simultaneously, and The Legend of Zelda: Four Swords, which also had cooperative multiplayer mechanics. Pico Park had its first playtest in Fall 2013.

The game was presented in the Tokyo Game Show 2014 and won the Best Presentation award of the event Sense of Wonder Night 2014 under the name Picolecitta. During the presentation, Teco used an external USB hub with 10 gamepads connected to it to demonstrate the game.

Pico Park was first released on April 26, 2016 for Microsoft Windows via Steam. The game was then released for Nintendo Switch on June 6, 2019, with updated textures and levels. Although the game was originally designed for local multiplayer, players requested the addition of online multiplayer features during the COVID-19 pandemic. On May 7, 2021, a new version of Pico Park was released for PC with online multiplayer and the additional features that came with the Nintendo Switch version. On September 9, 2021, the Nintendo Switch version also received an online multiplayer update.

== System ==
Pico Park is available on Microsoft Windows and Nintendo Switch, although cross-play between each system is not supported. There is also an official add-on application available on iOS and Android.

=== Steam ===
==== Pico Park: Classic Edition ====
Pico Park: Classic Edition was released to Steam on April 28, 2016. The classic version allows 2 to 10 players to play simultaneously. With a USB controller or smartphone as a controller, players play while sharing one screen. The game was free and was available on Steam. The all-time peak number of simultaneous players is 419 on August 1, 2021, and the all-time peak of average players played in a month is 218.

On June 1, 2026, TECOPARK had announced Pico Park: Classic Edition was going to be removed from the Steam store, and on June 14, 2026, it was removed from the Steam store.

==== Pico Park ====
Pico Park was released to Steam on May 7, 2021. The version supports 2 to 8 players simultaneously and online multiplayer gameplay. The price of the game is $4.99 on Steam. This update also comes with an updated set of textures. The all-time peak number of simultaneous players is 16,802 on July 1, 2021. The game has 90.82% positive reviews from players on Steam, from a total of 7,115 reviews. The game is estimated to have sold more than 230,000 copies since its release.

=== Nintendo Switch ===
The release date of Pico Park for Nintendo Switch is June 8, 2019. The price of the game is $4.99 on the Nintendo eShop. On September 9, 2021, an online mode was introduced. The game also supports cloud storage for game save files. The game can be played in TV mode, tabletop mode, or handheld mode.

=== TecoGamePad ===
TecoGamePad allows players to control characters in Pico Park without the use of a controller by controlling via a smartphone. This application is only supported by the Steam version, and both the computer and the smartphone must be connected to the same local network when in use.

== Reception ==
The game received Best Presentation award from Sense of Wonder Night 2014, and received average critic review score of 8 out of 10 from Famitsu.

Hanzomon Arata, in an article on Famitsu, wrote that the game looks enjoyable even when players are three generations apart, and that the gimmicks allow everyone to share the same joy with more experienced players guiding less experienced players.
