= Pico Park 2 =

2024 video game

- Developer: TECOPARK
- Designer: Teco
- Programmer: Teco
- Artist: Teco
- Composer: TADOSUKE
- Platforms: Microsoft Windows; Nintendo Switch; Xbox One; Xbox Series X/S
- Release: Switch: August 27, 2024; Windows, Xbox: September 12, 2024
- Genres: Action, Casual, Indie
- Mode: Co-op mode; multiplayer

Pico Park 2 is a cooperative multiplayer, action-puzzle independent game developed by Japanese developer TECOPARK. It was released for Nintendo Switch on August 27, 2024, with a Microsoft Windows, Xbox One, and Xbox Series X/S release on September 12.

It is the sequel to Pico Park.

== Development ==
Pico Park 2 was announced during the Nintendo Indie World Showcase on August 27, 2024, with a Nintendo Switch release the following day.

== Reception ==
Jenni Lada of Siliconera gave the game a 7 out of 10, praising the challenge the game gave while expressing frustration over varying player experiences. Paula Vaynshteyn of Destructoid described the experience as a "love-hate" relationship.
