= Sonic Rumble Party =

2025 video game

- App icon
- Developers: Sega; Sonic Team
- Publisher: Sega
- Director: Makoto Tase
- Producer: Takashi Iizuka
- Programmer: Hiromitsu Suto
- Series: Sonic the Hedgehog
- Engine: Unity
- Platforms: Android; iOS; IPadOS; Windows
- Release: November 5, 2025
- Genres: Party, battle royale
- Modes: Multiplayer, single-player

Sonic Rumble Party (Note: Formerly known as Sonic Rumble) is a 2025 party battle royale game in the Sonic the Hedgehog franchise, developed and published by Sega with Sonic Team. It features players as toy versions of Sonic characters competing in various challenges and minigames. Initially announced in May 2024, Sonic Rumble Party released for Windows, iOS, and Android on November 5, 2025, after multiple delays, and has been played by over 15 million players.

== Gameplay ==
Gameplay screenshot in which Sonic is seen running away from a giant chopper

Sonic Rumble Party is an online party game in which numerous players compete against each other in various mini-games and challenges, with the goal of collecting the most rings. The game supports up to 32 players in the first round, with half of the players being eliminated afterwards. The second round features the remaining 16 players, and again, half of them are eliminated. The final round then consists of the remaining 8 players, who compete in a final round to determine the winner.

The game features multiple game modes, which consist of the following:

- In 'Ring Survival', players compete to collect the most rings while surviving against challenges and other players. This is the game's main multiplayer mode.
- In 'Co-Op Battles', players team up as a group of 32 to fight the Death Egg Robot, working together to defeat it and earn rewards.
- 'Special Rumble' features a variety of competitions, including Run Battles and Survival Battles, where players race through three consecutive rounds with fixed rules. It includes challenges like Hyper Boost Battles and Low Gravity Battles, allowing players to race in alternate ways.

The game also supports custom matches; players can host their own lobbies in this mode, allowing them to compete against CPUs, friends, or other players.

== Development ==
Sonic Rumble Party was developed primarily by Sega, with input from Sonic Team. Rovio Entertainment was in charge of marketing and community relations for the game.

Program optimization was a major concern during development, as many mobile devices do not have powerful hardware. Hiromitsu Soto, the game's lead programmer, stated the following:

"On mobile, we prioritized lightweight performance to support a broad spectrum of hardware, including low-end devices. On PC, our focus shifted toward high-fidelity visuals and low-latency responsiveness. Balancing these needs required iterative testing and fine-tuning across platforms."

Rumble Party was designed as a community-focused game, and player feedback from the closed beta testing was considered essential. The "Quick Rumble" gameplay mode was conceived from such feedback; the game was initially composed exclusively of three-round matches, but upon realizing how many players play mobile games without a lot of time to spare, the developers implemented Quick Rumble so players could engage in a single round. To utilize such feedback, the game was delayed multiple times, providing the developers more time to improve balancing leading up to the global release.

== Release ==
Sonic Rumble Party was released for Windows, iOS, and Android on November 5, 2025, under the name Sonic Rumble. It was first made available to play via a closed beta from May 24–26, 2024, and was initially expected for a full release between late 2024 and early 2025, using the date of February 28, 2025, as a placeholder. However, it was revealed in March 2025 that the game was pushed back to the second quarter of the year.

On April 8, 2025, Sega had announced that the game would launch worldwide on May 8. However, on April 30, 2025, the release date was postponed indefinitely in order to address quality-related issues. Pocket Gamer reported in May that Sega intended to release Rumble later in 2025. In October, the final release date was reported by Engadget.

On March 16, 2026, Sonic Rumble was formally renamed Sonic Rumble Party as part of its 1.5.0 update.

== Reception ==
=== Pre-release ===
Giovanni Colantonio's pre-release review on Digital Trends praised the gameplay as fun, but criticized its slow pace, considering the game's presence in the fast-paced Sonic the Hedgehog series. Colantonio compared the game to Fall Guys and felt it was like "an unrelated game that's been reskinned to look like the franchise," and that it was missing what "make[s] Sonic games fun".

During the extended pre-release period, updates and adjustments were tested with more than 8 million soft-launch players, while an additional 1.4 million users pre-registered in regions not included in the soft launch.

=== Post-release ===
Sonic Rumble Party was heavily review bombed by Steam users.

Pocket Gamer's Will Quick praised the game for its colorful multiplayer challenges, varied gameplay, and satisfying progression, while noting that its heavy focus on customization can sometimes weaken its Sonic identity. Multiplayer.it's Tommaso Pugliese gave the game a 7/10, praising the large amount of content, gameplay, presentation, and music, but criticizes its imprecise controls, occasional visual chaos, time-restricted modes, and monetization.

Sonic Rumble Party earned about $228,000 in global mobile revenue during its initial ten days on the market. By November 2025, total player count had surpassed 15 million.

=== Awards ===
Year	Ceremony	Category	Result	Ref.
2025	The Game Awards	Best Mobile Game	Nominated	
