= Nex Playground =

Video game console

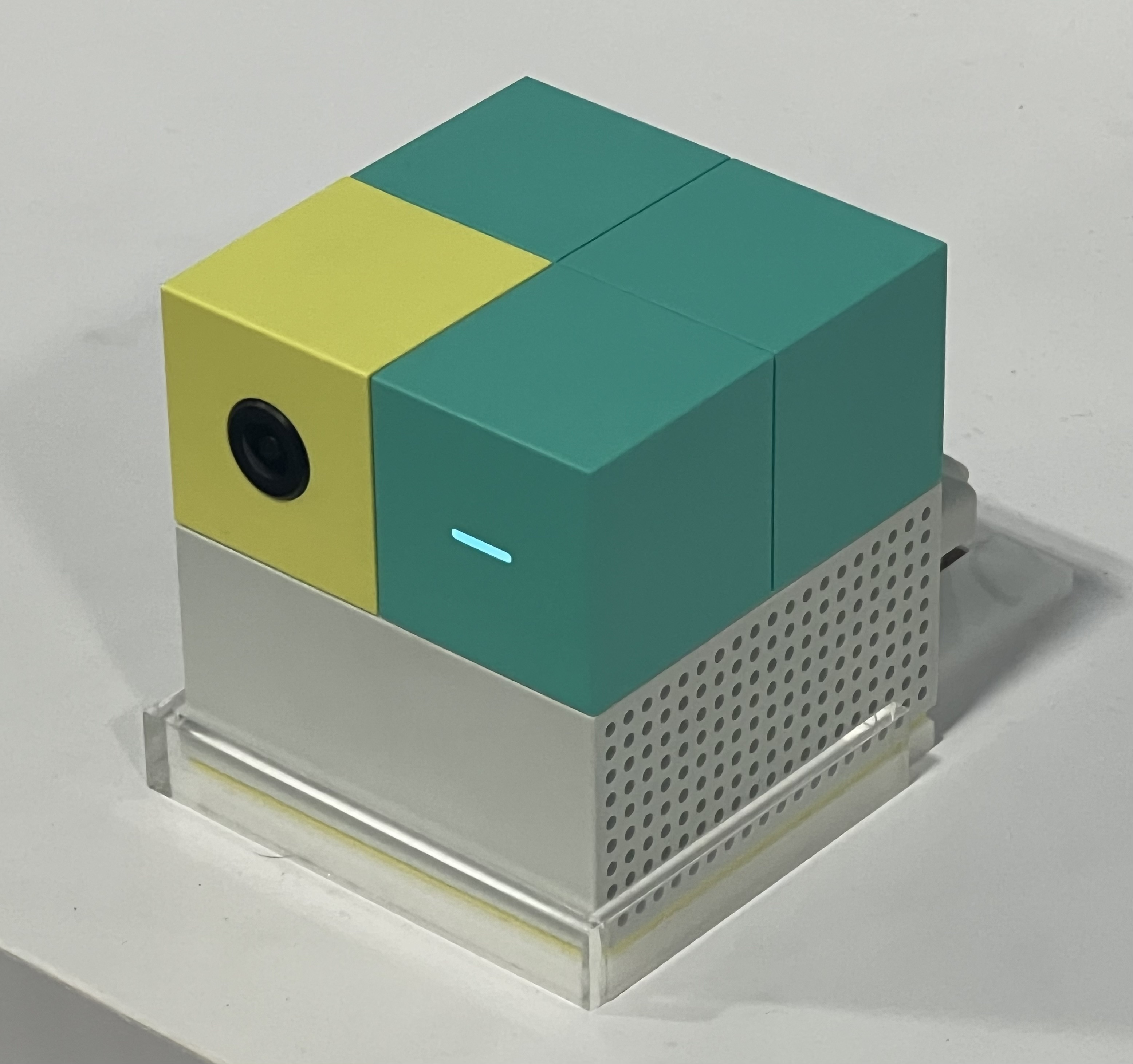
- Top right view of the original model of the NEX Playground console
- Manufacturer: Nex Team Inc.
- Type: Home video game console
- Released: December 2023
- Introductory price: US$199
- Operating system: Play OS (Android-based)
- System on a chip: Amlogic A311D2-NOD
- Memory: 16 GB LPDDR4X
- Storage: 64 GB eMMC
- Graphics: Mali-G52 MC4
- Input: Camera + Controller
- Dimensions: 3 × 3 × 3 in (76 × 76 × 76 mm)
- Website: nexplayground.com

The Nex Playground is a video game console developed by Nex that was released in December 2023. It uses motion capture to encourage indoor active play.

== Hardware ==
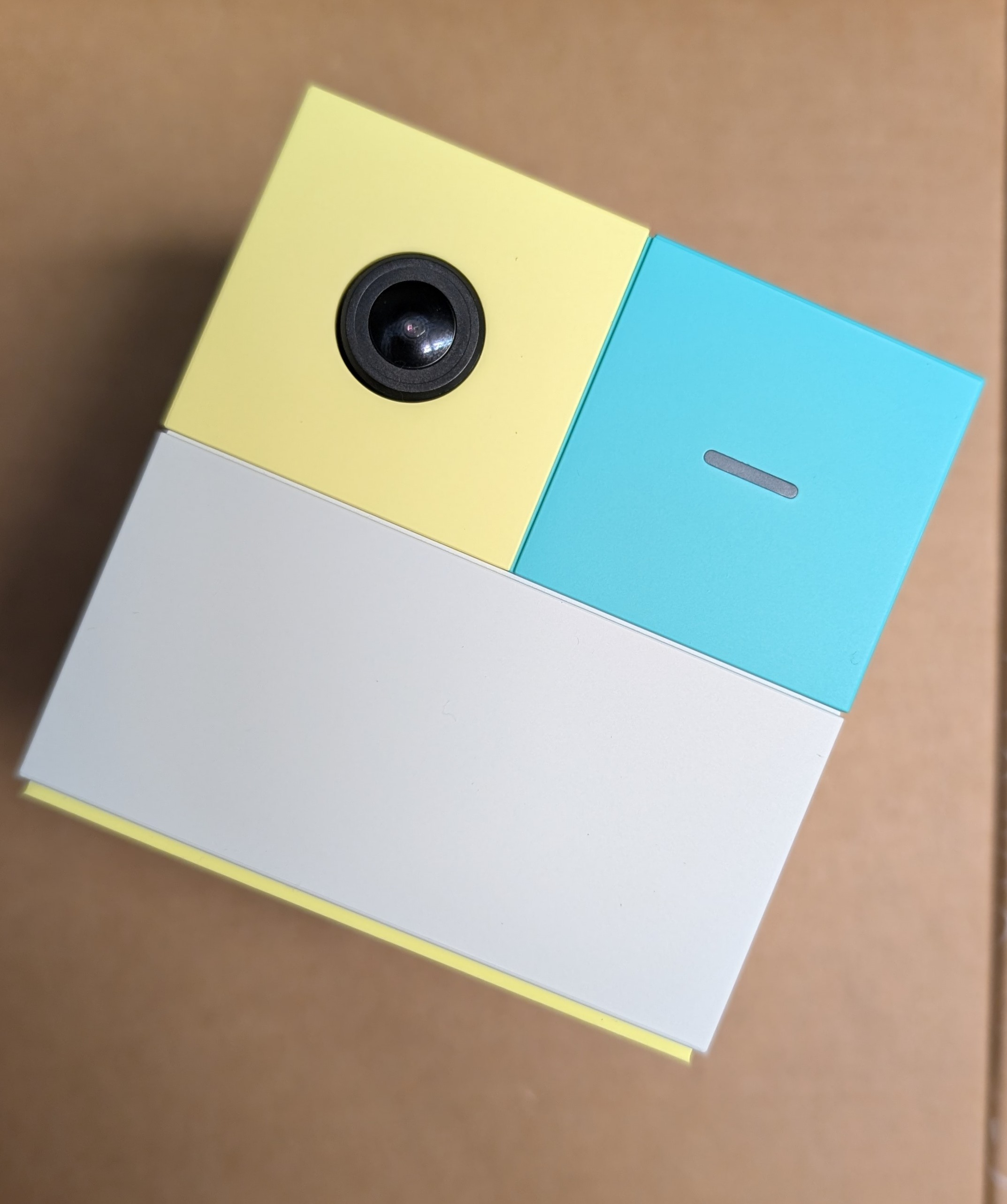
Front view of Nex Playground console

The Nex Playground is a video game console with a built-in ultra wide-angle camera, being described by Nex CEO David Lee as a successor to the Microsoft Kinect. It is designed for family audiences as opposed to more traditional gaming demographics that modern consoles are aimed at; analyst Martin Scott of Analysys Mason compared the target audience to that of the Nintendo Wii.

The console is a cube approximately 3" (76 mm) on all sides. It has an 8-core ARM chip and 64GB of built-in storage. A remote control connects to the console via Bluetooth and is used for navigating menus. The console connects to a display with an HDMI cable. A disc to cover the camera is included and magnetically snaps onto the console body.

== Games ==
Gameplay happens with use of an AI-powered motion tracking engine. Games are downloaded over Wi-Fi; after download, they can be played offline. The Nex Playground has adjustable difficulty options and accessibility features dedicated for people with limited mobility.

=== Built-in games ===
These games come with the console at no cost.

- Go Keeper
- Fruit Ninja
- Party Fowl
- Starri
- Whac-a-Mole

=== Play Pass ===
These games are available through the Play Pass subscription, which costs $89 annually. New games are developed and released onto Play Pass.

- 2048 Arms
- Active Arcade
- Aeon Guard
- Air Racer
- Arrow Party
- Avatar: The Last Airbender Earth Rumble
- Barbie Dance Party
- Basketball Knockout
- Bluey: Bust-a-Move
- Bowling Strike
- BoxFlow Fitness
- Brainy Inc.
- Brick Buster
- Candy Land Sugary Sprint
- Care Bears: Rainbow Ride
- Chroma Crew
- Connect 4 Bounce
- Copy Cat Deluxe
- Doodle Heads
- Dora: Star Explorer
- Dragon Jumpers
- Dude Perfect: Trickshot Challenge
- Family Fitness Challenge
- Freefall Racers
- Gabby's Dollhouse: A-meow-zing Moves
- Galax
- Homerun Heroes: StarStrikers
- How to Train Your Dragon: Riders of the Skies
- Hungry Hungry Hippos Move N' Munch
- Juglr
- Kung Fu Panda: Train Like a Master
- Luminous
- Mingle
- Miniacs: Steering Madness
- Miraculous Ladybug: Paris Dash
- Mirrorama
- NBA Versus
- NexGym
- NexPets: Puppies
- NFL FLAG Heroes
- NHL Puck Rush
- Nickelodeon The Tiny Chef Show: Cooking with Fwends
- Pac-Man on Nex
- Peppa Pig: Jump & Giggle
- Pip's Tale
- Rubik's Showdown
- Sesame Street's Cookie Monster’s Cookie Factory
- Sesame Street's Elmo & Abby's Magical Letter Hunt
- Sesame Street's Elmo Says
- Sesame Street's Move & Groove with Grover
- Sonic Forces: Rival Rush
- Starzzle
- Sword Slash Adventure
- Teenage Mutant Ninja Turtles: Rooftop Mayhem
- Tennis Smash: Racketville
- Training Ground
- Tumbobots
- Unicorn Academy: Friendship Adventures
- What on Earth?
- Zumba Fitness Party

== Reception ==
Simon Hill of Wired gave the console a rating of 6/10, praising the device's design and motion tracking capabilities, but criticizing the limited library of games and pricing scheme. It was described as a "Box That Looks Like the OUYA and Kinect Had a Kid" by gaming industry analyst Mat Piscatella. It was positively reviewed by Haley Perry of Wirecutter, who remarked the accessibility of the experience and game selection, but criticised occasional issues with the motion control.

IGN awarded it a score of 5 out of 10, saying, "The Nex Playground's motion tracking tech works well, but the game library is locked behind a pricey subscription that sours the experience."

=== Sales ===
The Nex Playground became a sought after gift during the Black Friday shopping season in 2024 and 2025. Retail partners including Target, Amazon, Walmart, and Best Buy sold out of consoles and customers waited for small restocks to be able to purchase the game.

At certain points, it has had greater weekly sales than traditional consoles such as Xbox Series or certain PlayStation 5 SKUs. During the week ending November 22, 2025, the Nex Playground was the second best-selling hardware SKU in the United States based on units sold. According to Nex, the Playground has surpassed sales of one million units in the United States and Canada.
