= Hardlight =

British mobile game developer owned by Sega

- Type: Subsidiary
- Industry: Video games
- Founded: January 2012; 14 years ago
- Founder: Chris Southall
- Headquarters: Leamington Spa, England
- Key people: Neall Jones
- Parent: Sega (2012–2019); Sega Europe (2019–present)
- Website: hardlightstudio.com

Hardlight (formerly known as Sega Hardlight) is a British video game developer of Sega based in Leamington Spa, England. First mentioned in January 2012, it is focused on mobile games for smartphones and became a part of Sega Europe in 2019.

Founded by Sega employee Chris Southall, Hardlight initially began work on research and development for handheld game consoles, but soon shifted to mobile games after being asked by Sega as part of an initiative to increase mobile game development outside of Japan. Hardlight developed several mobile games in the Sonic the Hedgehog and Crazy Taxi video game series and its games received numerous downloads, with Sonic Dash having been downloaded millions of times.

== History ==
Hardlight was founded by Chris Southall, a former Codemasters employee who also helped to found Sega Racing Studio and first mentioned by Sega in January 2012. After working with Sega Racing Studio, Southall worked in Sega technical support areas along with a team, and served as chief technology officer for Sega Europe. According to Southall, Sega's desire for more development of mobile games led to Hardlight's foundation.

The initial studio was in Dorridge, Solihull, in the West Midlands. Shortly after its formation, Sega announced that Hardlight was in development on a PlayStation Vita action-adventure game, to be released in late 2012. Hardlight also performed some research and development work for the Nintendo 3DS. According to studio manager Sion Lenton, Hardlight employed 21 employees at this time, in addition to contracted staff, and had a goal of remaining small for the moment. By September 2012, Hardlight had completed a port of Viking: Battle for Asgard for PC.

Sega would make the decision to focus more on mobile games in the west, having had success in Japan. Hardlight was asked to shift its focus to developing games for iOS and Android systems. Their first project was a remake of Sonic Jump, which had originally been developed for the T-Mobile Sidekick and released in 2005. Southall called development of the remake "an interesting learning process". Hardlight relocated its studio around that time to Leamington Spa, a town with a community of video game developers in the area. By the time of Sonic Jump's launch in October 2012, the studio was working on developing titles in the Sonic the Hedgehog and Crazy Taxi series. Although initially faced with difficulty deciding which to develop, Sega Sammy Holdings president and chief operating officer (COO) Haruki Satomi saw a demo of Sonic Dash and liked it so much that he insisted it be developed. Sonic Dash was initially scheduled for a Christmas 2012 release, but would not be released until March 2013.

The studio's next title was Crazy Taxi: City Rush. The concept for developing a mobile Crazy Taxi game came from the original Sega AM3 producer, Kenji Kanno. Hardlight worked with Kanno on design aspects for the game. Subsequently, Hardlight released Sonic Dash 2: Sonic Boom and Sonic Jump Fever. After these releases, all of which were casual games, Hardlight began looking at developing a more strategy-oriented game involving multiplayer. After some discussions with Sonic Team, Hardlight began working on Sonic Forces Speed Battle, to tie in with the upcoming 2017 release of Sonic Forces. While development of the game began with a small team of three or four developers, up to 28 were involved with the project as the game closed in on its release.

In April 2019, Hardlight was integrated more closely into Sega Europe, structuring it as one of five "pillars" alongside Creative Assembly, Sports Interactive, Relic Entertainment, and Amplitude Studios. In the same announcement, Sega emphasized that Hardlight would continue its focus on mobile games. Neall Jones, formerly of Codemasters, Traveller's Tales, and Eidos Interactive was announced to be the studio's new director; Southall and operations head Harinder Sangha departed for Sumo Digital. Jones anticipated that the studio's staff will double over time. He also expressed a belief in more intellectual property for PCs and consoles will see more releases for mobile devices.

Hardlight developed ChuChu Rocket! Universe and Sonic Racing—a port of Team Sonic Racing—for Apple Arcade, which were released on the service's launch date of 19 September 2019. Production of ChuChu Rocket! Universe took approximately eight months starting with a team of 15 people that doubled in size over time. In designing the game, a sequel of the 1999 Dreamcast game ChuChu Rocket!, Hardlight had to redesign the game in full 3D. According to director Paul Twynholm, testing of the game had to occur internally because the game could not be soft launched for Apple Arcade. Twynholm acknowledged a desire to bring back Sega franchises in future Hardlight releases.

By June 2015, Sonic Dash had been downloaded over 100 million times across multiple different platforms, and had 14 million players per month. By November 2017, Sonic Dash's download count was over 300 million. Within its first five days of release, Sonic Forces Speed Battle had been downloaded 1.3 million times, and reached 2 million downloads within its first two weeks. According to Southall in a November 2017 interview, Hardlight was continuing to work on updates for Sonic Dash, Sonic Dash 2, and Crazy Taxi: City Rush. In a February 2020 interview, Jones expressed the studio's surprise at the longevity of Sonic Dash, having been downloaded more than 350 million times and earned more than $10.1 million. He spoke on the implementation of new features to keep the game interesting, as well as additions such as a baby Sonic from the Sonic the Hedgehog film.

In March 2024, Sega announced it would cut 240 roles across Sega Europe, Creative Assembly, and Hardlight.

== Games developed ==
Year	Title	Platform(s)	Ref.
2012	Viking: Battle for Asgard	Windows	
2012	Sonic Jump	Android, iOS	
2013	Sonic Dash	Android, iOS, Windows, Windows Phone	
2014	Sonic Jump Fever	Android, iOS	
2014	Crazy Taxi: City Rush	Android, iOS	
2015	Sonic Dash 2: Sonic Boom	Android, iOS	
2016	BlockAid	Windows	
2017	Sonic Forces: Speed Battle	Android, iOS	
2017	Sonic Forces	Windows	
2018	Yakuza 0	Windows	
2018	Valkyria Chronicles 4	Windows	
2019	Sonic Racing	Apple Arcade	
2019	ChuChu Rocket! Universe	Apple Arcade	
2020	Two Point Hospital	Nintendo Switch, PlayStation 4, Xbox One	
2023	Sonic Dream Team	Apple Arcade	

=== Cancelled ===
Title	Platform(s)	Notes	Ref.
Kingdom Conquest: Dark Empire	Android, iOS	Cancelled in May 2018	
