= Sonic Forces (mobile game) =

2017 video game

- Developer: Hardlight
- Publisher: Sega
- Series: Sonic the Hedgehog
- Engine: Unity
- Platforms: iOS, Android
- Release: iOS; November 2, 2017; Android; November 15, 2017
- Genre: Racing
- Mode: Mutliplayer

Sonic Forces (also known as Sonic Forces Mobile, formerly known as Sonic Forces: Speed Battle) is a 2017 multiplayer online mobile racing game developed by Hardlight and published by Sega, serving as a tie-in and spin-off of the console game of the same name. The game features four-player races in which players compete using characters from the Sonic franchise. It was released in November 2017 for iOS and Android.

== Gameplay ==
In Sonic Forces, four players race against each other. Above, the player character (Sonic) is racing against Tails, Shadow, and Knuckles.

Sonic Forces is a multiplayer racing game which features similar gameplay to Sonic Dash (2013). Players compete against three real-world opponents simultaneously as their selected characters automatically sprint along 3D tracks. Players swipe left or right to switch lanes, swipe up to jump over hurdles or onto grind rails, and swipe down to slide underneath hazards or plow through enemies. As players navigate the track, they can run over dash pads for instant speed bursts and collect Rings, which gradually increase their character's top speed. Scattered throughout the course are item boxes containing a variety of weapons and abilities, similar to Mario Kart, that vary depending on the player's selected character.

Finishing races rewards players with chests containing character cards and Rings, which are used to unlock and level up runners. Players can also acquire Red Star Rings. Players can unlock and upgrade a roster of characters from the Sonic franchise, alongside numerous variants; content themed around the live-action Sonic the Hedgehog film series, IDW comic series, and Sonic Prime have been added; characters from Angry Birds were also added during a collaboration event. Upgrading characters enhances their underlying statistics while simultaneously amplifying the effectiveness of their unique power-up items. The game features challenges to unlock certain special characters.

== Development and release ==
Development on Sonic Forces began in April 2016 with a small team at Hardlight, who were initially experimenting with what they could do with multiplayer, but the game later went into full production with a larger team in October. The game builds off the gameplay of Sonic Dash. It became a tie-in with the console game as Sonic Team wanted a game that would compliment it. After a soft launch in the Philippines in September 2017, the game officially released worldwide for iOS on November 2, 2017, followed by an Android release on November 15, 2017.

The game was originally released as Sonic Forces: Speed Battle before "Speed Battle" was dropped from the game's title in 2018. Since its release, the game has been continuously supported with updates, roster additions, and events to celebrate ongoing franchise milestones.

=== Other versions ===
A modified version of the game titled Sonic Forces: Rival Rush was announced for the Nex Playground platform in 2026.

== Reception ==
=== Pre-release ===
Jon Mundy of Pocket Gamer wrote that the game is a fun evolution of Sonic Dash, with real-time competitive multiplayer and power-ups making the format more engaging, though questioned whether the game would have enough depth and balanced free-to-play features to sustain long-term play.

Reception

Review scores
Publication	Score
Pocket Gamer	3.5/5
Mutliplayer.it	7.5
Game Industry News	3.5/5

=== Post-release ===
Within its first five days of release, Sonic Forces had been downloaded 1.3 million times, and reached 2 million downloads within its first two weeks. In the week of its iOS release, it ranked 3rd place on the UK App Store. By April 21, 2020, Sonic Forces had been downloaded over 50 million times and reached US$4.2 million in revenue.

Critical reviews were mixed, with praise directed toward its multiplayer racing and accessibility, while criticism focused on its monetization, ads, and technical issues. Ric Cowley of Pocket Gamer called the game "a lot of fun to play, though it's probably best off experienced in short bursts". Billy White of Game Industry News praises the game's fast, fun multiplayer racing but criticizes its loot boxes, forced ads, and occasional lag. Similarly, Tommaso Pugliese of Multiplayer.it praises the game for its fast, engaging competitive multiplayer, varied characters and polished presentation, while criticizing its repetitive endless runner formula, intrusive ads, and slow progression without spending money. Andy Price of TapSmart found the game's fast, fun multiplayer racing and well-matched competition enjoyable, but criticized its frustrating freemium system, long unlock times, ads, chest timers, and glitches.

==== Awards ====
Year	Ceremony	Result	Ref.
2018	International Mobile Gaming Awards	Nominated	
