= Sonic Forces =

2017 video game

- Developer: Sonic Team (Note: Ported to Windows by Hardlight)
- Publisher: Sega
- Director: Morio Kishimoto
- Producers: Shun Nakamura; Takashi Iizuka
- Designers: Morio Kishimoto; Jyunpei Ootsu; Takayuki Okada
- Programmer: Hiroki Tokunaga
- Artists: Yoshitaka Miura; Sachiko Kawamura
- Writers: Eitaro Toyoda; Makoto Goya; Ken Pontac; Warren Graff
- Composers: Tomoya Ohtani; Naofumi Hataya; Kenichi Tokoi; Takahito Eguchi
- Series: Sonic the Hedgehog
- Platforms: Nintendo Switch; PlayStation 4; Windows; Xbox One
- Release: WW: November 7, 2017; JP: November 9, 2017
- Genre: Platform
- Mode: Single-player

Sonic Forces (Note: Japanese: ソニックフォース, Hepburn: Sonikku Fōsu) is a 2017 platform game developed by Sonic Team and published by Sega. It was produced in commemoration of the 25th anniversary of the Sonic the Hedgehog franchise. The plot focuses on Sonic the Hedgehog joining a resistance movement formed by his friends, alongside its rookie and his misplaced past self. Together, they must stop Doctor Eggman, who has conquered most of the world alongside Infinite, his newest lackey who has been empowered by the Phantom Ruby. It features three gameplay modes: "Classic", side-scrolling gameplay similar to the original Sega Genesis Sonic games, "Modern", 3D gameplay similar to Sonic Unleashed (2008) and Sonic Colors (2010), and a mode featuring the "Avatar", the player's custom character.

Development of Sonic Forces began after the release of Sonic Lost World in 2013. With the game's title chosen to signify its themes of power and teamwork, it was intended to have a darker tone compared to previous entries in the franchise and the character creation system was inspired by Sonic fan art the developers had come across over the years. The game was primarily developed by staff who had worked on Sonic Colors and Sonic Generations (2011), using an updated version of the Hedgehog Engine, used in Sonic Unleashed and Generations. It was announced, alongside Sonic Mania, under the working title of Project Sonic 2017 during the Sonic 25th anniversary event at the 2016 San Diego Comic-Con. The development of Sonic Forces, including the plot, was influenced by Sonic Mania.

Sonic Forces was released for Nintendo Switch, PlayStation 4, Windows and Xbox One on November 2017 to mixed reviews from critics. They praised its presentation, music, voice acting, character creation system and the Modern Sonic gameplay, but criticized the plot, overly automated level design and gameplay, technical problems, short length and the inclusion of Classic Sonic, with many critics deeming it as a disappointment in the wake of the positively-received Mania, released earlier that year. This critical feedback would later influence the development of the Sonic franchise's next entry, Sonic Frontiers (2022).

== Gameplay ==
In addition to the two gameplay styles of Modern and Classic Sonic, players create their own custom character, who is able to use gadgets and other items.

Sonic Forces is an action-adventure platform game similar in gameplay and style to prior Sonic the Hedgehog games. The player's goal is to liberate the world from the newly established reign of Doctor Eggman. The game features three playable characters: two variants of Sonic the Hedgehog ("Classic" and "Modern") and the "Avatar" (the player's custom character). Each has unique abilities and attributes: Classic Sonic is restricted to side-scrolling gameplay reminiscent of the Sega Genesis Sonic games and can perform a spin dash on the ground and a drop dash in mid-air to gain speed. Modern Sonic's gameplay follows a similar style to Sonic Unleashed and Sonic Colors: he can double jump, perform a homing attack on enemies, springs and zip lines and a speed boost by collecting White Wisps. The Avatar is created from a base of seven animal types, which each possess a unique ability; they also wield a grappling hook and can equip weapons known as Wispons, including flamethrowers, whips and hammers. Depending on the Wispon, Avatars can use temporary abilities by collecting a corresponding Wisp type. Certain parts see players controlling both Modern Sonic and the Avatar, switching between them as necessary, similar to Sonic Heroes.

The game is split into several themed levels, some of which are based on locations from past games, such as Green Hill Zone. Players must complete each level while fighting waves of enemies, and (with the exception of Classic Sonic) seamlessly shift from side-scrolling to third-person perspectives. Stages are filled with features such as spring boards, rails, and boost pads, and obstacles such as spikes, bottomless pits, and robots. Scattered around levels are golden rings, which serve as a form of health: rings protect players from damage caused by robots or other hazards, though they lose their rings upon being hit; being hit with no rings kills the player. The game does not use a traditional life system, instead deducting from the player's score depending on the number of deaths. Players are given a grade dependent on their performance; an "S" rank is the best and a "C" is the worst. Certain levels feature a boss, which must be defeated in order to proceed. Bonus levels can be unlocked by collecting Red Rings hidden in most stages and players may occasionally receive SOS Missions, tasking them with replaying levels with a specific objective.

== Plot ==
Doctor Eggman attacks a city and Sonic sets out to stop him. Upon arriving, he is attacked by Infinite, a mercenary empowered by the Phantom Ruby. (Note: first seen in Sonic Mania) Infinite defeats Sonic, who is taken prisoner aboard the Death Egg. Without Sonic to stop him further, Eggman, with the help of his robots, Infinite, Shadow the Hedgehog, Chaos, Zavok and Metal Sonic, manages to conquer the world within six months. Knuckles the Echidna forms a resistance movement with Tails, the Chaotix, Amy Rose, Silver the Hedgehog, Rouge the Bat and a survivor of Eggman's attack who is solely referred to as the "Rookie". Knuckles discovers Sonic's whereabouts and the Rookie steals a space shuttle, breaks into the Death Egg and rescues him. Back in the city, Tails is ambushed by Chaos, but is saved by Classic Sonic, who has now been marooned in the present due to the Phantom Ruby's power. The duo set out to spy on Eggman, learning about the gemstone and that Eggman has an endgame that will dispose of the resistance upon taking effect in three days.

Meanwhile, Sonic encounters Shadow, who reveals that the Shadow following Eggman is an illusionary doppelgänger created by Infinite, as are the other villains serving him, and that limitless numbers of them can be mass-produced to bolster Eggman's army. Tails infiltrates Eggman's computer network and finds the Phantom Ruby's weakness – the gemstone is directly powered by the Death Egg and will be rendered useless without it. While the Rookie stages a diversion, the Death Egg is destroyed by Classic Sonic. Believing they have the upper hand, the resistance attacks the Eggman Empire's capital, Metropolis. However, Eggman has a backup power source hidden in his empire's fortress and as the resistance make their final charge toward it, he has Infinite enact his endgame – creating an asteroid-like second sun over the planet that will eliminate everything in its path upon impact. Thinking fast, the Rookie uses a prototype Phantom Ruby they had recovered to dispel the sun, saving the heroes. Sonic and the Rookie then battle Infinite and defeat him, but Eggman unveils yet another backup plan, moving the original Phantom Ruby into his own personal battle mech and fighting the resistance directly. Working together, the Sonics and the Rookie defeat Eggman, leaving the doctor's whereabouts unknown. With the Phantom Ruby neutralized, all of the doppelgängers serving Eggman's army cease existing, Classic Sonic is returned to his proper time period, the Resistance disbands and Modern Sonic and his friends set out to restore the world to its former glory while the Rookie leaves to find their own way.

=== Episode Shadow ===
The DLC pack Episode Shadow serves as a prequel to the story, one month before the main plot begins. Shadow heads into the city towards enemy territory on Rouge's command, but E-123 Omega ends up causing chaos despite the fact that the mission is meant to be recon. As Shadow goes on, Omega starts getting confused, with his sensors becoming disabled, and his mind being corrupted before going silent. It is later revealed that Omega was badly damaged by Infinite, whom Shadow does not recognize. To help him remember, Infinite sends Shadow through a flashback of when Shadow had invaded Eggman's base.

The leader of the Jackal Squad mercenary group, the rest of which were taken out by Shadow beforehand, is commanded by Eggman to eliminate Shadow. However, his efforts are futile against Shadow, who easily thrashes him to the side, insults his weakness and leaves. Unable to handle the pain of being called "weak", he covers up his past and gains the power he uses now from the Phantom Ruby, rechristening himself as Infinite. After Infinite snaps Shadow out of the flashback, Shadow is transported to Green Hill Zone, where Infinite demonstrates his ability to manipulate people's minds by making Shadow think Rouge is talking nonsense to him and Omega is still alive and active, making him realize Infinite's capabilities.

== Development ==
Development of Sonic Forces began shortly after the completion of Sonic Lost World (2013) under the codename Project Sonic 2017. It was developed alongside Sonic Mania. It was developed by Sonic Team; the majority of the staff had previously developed Sonic Colors and Sonic Generations (which followed a similar premise). The game was directed by Morio Kishimoto, who previously directed the console versions of Sonic Colors and Lost World. The game was produced in commemoration of the series' twenty-fifth anniversary and the title was chosen to signify its themes of power, teamwork and armies.

The game was intended to give a darker perspective to the world of Sonic, in contrast to the fantasy-based themes of previous entries, and expand upon the modern-style gameplay from Unleashed and Colors. To create this, the developers designed levels to seem desolate and more realistic. In programming the game, the development team used the Hedgehog Engine 2, an updated version of the game engine used in Sonic Unleashed and Sonic Generations. The gameplay was mostly modeled off Unleashed's, with elements from Colors and Generations. With the updated software, the first locations designed were the urban levels, which served as a reference for other stages. Sonic Team sought to make the levels unique and contrasting and various level ideas were suggested during development; one example was a prison in Green Hill. At one point in development, the series' traditional ring-based health system was abandoned to balance the game's difficulty, and for designing the Classic levels, the team looked to Generations and Mania as a reference.

Sonic Team head Takashi Iizuka explained that for years, he had seen many fan-made characters and wanted to give players the opportunity to play as their own. The team was given freedom to create the animal and customization mechanics. According to producer Shun Nakamura, the system was intended to modify existing characters rather than use the complex mechanics of series such as Fallout, so the characters would still feel like a part of the Sonic universe. Though Sonic Mania entered development years later than Forces, it affected the development; the games have connected plots, and Mania was envisioned to excite fans for Forces.

Recurring series writers Ken Pontac and Warren Graff contributed to the English script.

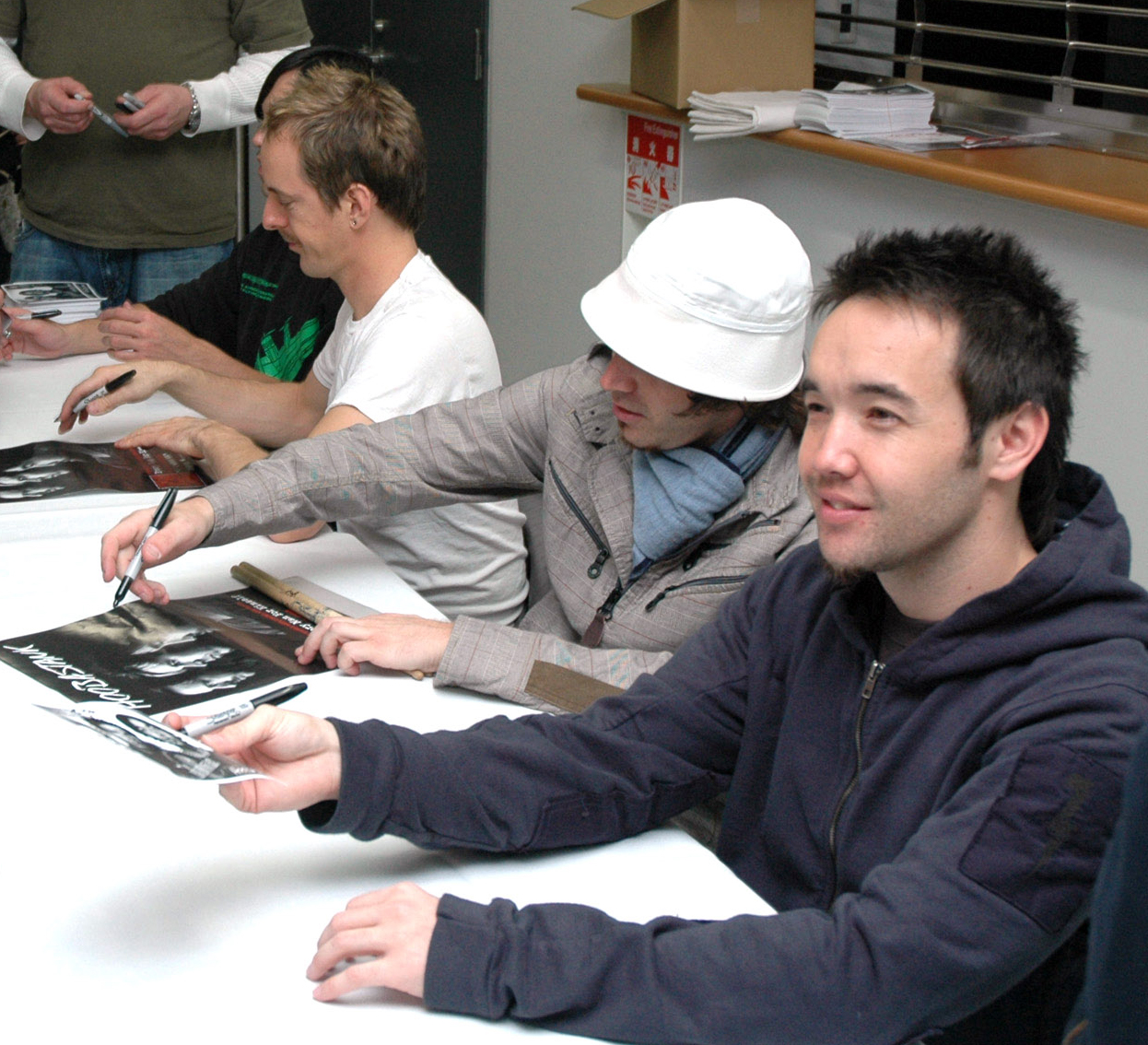
Doug Robb (right) of Hoobastank co-wrote and sang the game's theme song, "Fist Bump".

The soundtrack was primarily composed by series sound director Tomoya Ohtani and performed by the London Symphony Orchestra, with additional music from Naofumi Hataya, Kenichi Tokoi, and Takahito Eguchi. The theme song, "Fist Bump", was written by Ohtani and features lyrics written and performed by Doug Robb of the American rock band Hoobastank. Ohtani wrote Infinite's theme, which was performed by Tyler Smyth and Andy Bane of the band DangerKids. Arrangements of tracks from Sonic CD (1993), Sonic Adventure 2 (2001), Shadow the Hedgehog (2005) and Sonic Lost World (2013) were used. A three-disc official soundtrack, Sonic Forces Original Soundtrack – A Hero Will Rise, was released in Japan by Sega's music label Wave Master on December 13, 2017.

== Release ==
Sonic Forces was announced alongside Sonic Mania under its codename during a twenty-fifth series anniversary event held by Sega at San Diego Comic-Con on July 22, 2016. The presence of both Classic and Modern Sonic in the initial teaser trailer led some journalists to believe it was a sequel to Sonic Generations, but Iizuka clarified that it was a separate game. The game was released worldwide on Nintendo Switch, PlayStation 4, Windows, and Xbox One in November 2017. Prior to the game's launch, Sega released a four-part prequel comic written and drawn by Ian Flynn and Adam Bryce Thomas, who previously worked on Archie Comics' Sonic the Hedgehog series. A bonus edition was released containing controller skins and downloadable clothing items for the Avatar based on other Sega games, such as Jet Set Radio, Puyo Puyo, and Persona 5.

A tie-in racing game for iOS and Android devices, Sonic Forces: Speed Battle, was released in select regions in September 2017. After the game's release, several updates featuring new content were released, such as an in-game shirt for the Avatar featuring "Sanic", an internet meme of a poorly drawn Sonic, and the ability to transform into Super Sonic. The Super Sonic DLC was released for free, but was initially planned as paid DLC. In March 2020, Sonic Forces (along with Shadow of the Colossus) became available as a free PS4 game for PlayStation Plus subscribers.

=== Episode Shadow ===
Episode Shadow features Shadow the Hedgehog as the playable character.

Episode Shadow is free downloadable content (DLC) for Sonic Forces that launched alongside the game. The story acts as a prequel, focuses on Shadow the Hedgehog and his friends Rouge the Bat and E-123 Omega, and explores the origins of Infinite. Players control Shadow, who handles similarly to Modern Sonic but has unique abilities such as the ability to perform a chain of homing attacks in rapid succession. The pack adds three original levels to the game, and the ability to play as Shadow in most of Modern Sonic's stages. According to Nakamura, Sonic Team created Episode Shadow to appeal to fans of older games in the series, such as Sonic Adventure (1998). It was the first time that Shadow was a playable character in a mainline Sonic game since Sonic the Hedgehog (2006), with some critics writing that it was much more difficult than the main game.

== Reception ==
Reception

Aggregate scores
Aggregator	Score
Metacritic	PC: 56/100; NS: 57/100; PS4: 57/100; XONE: 62/100
OpenCritic	14% recommend

Review scores
Publication	Score
Destructoid	NS: 5.5/10
Easy Allies	PS4: 2.5/5
Electronic Gaming Monthly	PS4: 3/5
Famitsu	35/40
Game Informer	XONE: 6.5/10
GameSpot	5/10
GamesRadar+	PS4: 2.5/5
Hardcore Gamer	PS4: 3.5/5
IGN	6.9/10
Nintendo Life	NS: 6/10
PC Gamer (US)	PC: 50/100
Polygon	5/10
Push Square	PS4: 4/10

Sonic Forces received "mixed or average" reviews from critics, according to review aggregator website Metacritic.

Writing for Polygon, Jeremy Parish praised the game's visuals and character customization, but criticized its repetitive boss fights and argued the game did not advance the series' design. Parish disliked the ranking system, which rewards players for completing stages quickly rather than exploring them for collectibles, and dismissed the tag team sections as "under-developed" because players would prefer to use Modern Sonic whenever the Avatar was not required. The four reviewers of Famitsu were more positive, praising the character creation system, story, and soundtrack. Heidi Kemps, reviewing Forces for IGN, faulted elements of the game's level design, indicating that "unfair-feeling traps" recurred intermittently and that the levels were relatively short and underdeveloped. In contrast to Parish, Kemps enjoyed the "quite strong" bosses, particularly one fought "among the winding coils of a giant snake," although she wished they were more plentiful. Kemps cited the game's "goofy charm" as preventing her from being "too disappointed" by it.

The level design received divisive responses while Classic Sonic's presence received a mediocre reception. Kotaku's Heather Alexandra wrote that Modern Sonic's gameplay was "visually dynamic" and "the most fun", but heavily automated and shallow, whereas Classic Sonic delivered a solid but unremarkable platforming experience that compared unfavorably to the more inventive Sonic Mania. Alexandra panned the Avatar stages as "disjointed and confused" due to a lack of flow and an excessive reliance on trial and error. Overall, they described Forces as fun despite a lack of polish and complimented its "infectious energy and excitement". Game Informer's Brian Shea similarly regarded the game as a "fun adventure" and considered its controls and level design to be the best of any 3D Sonic entry, but concluded: "3D Sonic games still aren't to where they should be after such a long time of iteration and experimentation". Shea called Classic Sonic the worst of the three playable characters due to poor physics that failed to emulate those of the original 2D Sonic games. Ben "Yahtzee" Croshaw of The Escapist panned it for not exploring the potential of its ideas and lambasted the story for its attempt at a more mature tone. He later ranked it the second worst game of 2017. Several critics considered Sonic Forces a disappointment in the wake of the positively received Mania.

John Linneman of Eurogamer found that Forces was well-optimized for PlayStation 4, with no noticeable improvement when played on a PlayStation 4 Pro, whereas the Xbox One version was "slightly more responsive" but marred by screen tearing and inferior resolution. He felt that playing on Xbox One X provided the best overall experience, albeit with some "unwelcome inconsistency" caused by occasional changes in resolution and framerate. The Windows version received criticism for problems related to its uneven performance and frequent crashes; Sega released a patch on launch day that fixed some of the problems.

=== Sales ===
In the United Kingdom, Sonic Forces debuted at fifth place on the all-formats chart. In Japan, the PS4 version debuted at 10th place with 5,938 physical sales and the Switch version debuted at 14th place with 4,686 physical sales, adding up to 10,624 physical units sold in its first week. Sega stated in a February 2018 financial report that the game "performed strongly".

== Legacy ==
The critical feedback that Sonic Forces received heavily influenced the development of the subsequent game in the series, Sonic Frontiers (2022). Kishimoto acknowledged the lackluster reception and concluded that Sonic Team's method of designing levels that originated in Sonic Unleashed would no longer satisfy fans. The open-world Frontiers was designed to be lengthy, with an emphasis on exploration, puzzles and combat to address the criticism that Forces received for its short length. The story of Forces influenced the plot of IDW Publishing's Sonic the Hedgehog comic book series, with its narrative beginning shortly after the game's events. Music from the game appeared in Super Smash Bros. Ultimate, and the Sunset Heights level was later remade in Shadow Generations. The Luminous Forest level was featured in Sonic Racing: CrossWorlds (2025).

Infinite reappears as the main antagonist in the 2026 audio drama podcast Sonic the Hedgehog Presents: The Chaotix Casefiles, voiced by Alejandro Saab. In the drama, he has survived his presumed demise, and stolen the Astroscopic Lens, which create illusions and amplifies power, in an attempt to destroy the world once again.

The Null Space, which was also introduced in the game, appears again in DC x Sonic the Hedgehog: Metal Legion..
