= Sonic Dash =

2013 video game

- Developer: Hardlight
- Publisher: Sega
- Series: Sonic the Hedgehog
- Engine: Unity (uncredited)
- Platforms: iOS; IPadOS; Android; Windows Phone; Microsoft Windows; Arcade
- Release: iOS; March 7, 2013; Android; November 26, 2013; Windows Phone; December 3, 2014; Microsoft Windows; December 3, 2014; Arcade; November 2015
- Genre: Endless runner
- Modes: Single-player, multiplayer

Sonic Dash is a 2013 endless runner mobile game developed by Hardlight and published by Japanese game studio Sega. It is Hardlight's second Sonic the Hedgehog game, the first being 2012's Sonic Jump. The game was released in March 2013 for iOS, November 2013 for Android, and December 2014 for Windows Phone and Windows, along with an arcade release in November 2015 as Sonic Dash Extreme. It was initially released as a paid application, but was made free-to-play a month after its iOS release.

The goal of Sonic Dash is to avoid obstacles and enemies while collecting rings. In mission mode, players must complete objectives. Players can compete for higher positions on leaderboards. Rings, which can be earned through gameplay or purchased in app, allow access to upgrades and additional characters.

Hardlight, a British development studio owned by Sega, began developing Sonic Dash after completing Sonic Jump. Selection of the game for development came from the insistence of parent company Sega Sammy Holdings president and COO Haruki Satomi. Although the game received mixed reviews, Sonic Dash reached 500 million downloads in September 2021. Hardlight continues to support the game with updates, additional characters, and features. Sequels have also been produced based on Sonic Boom and Sonic Forces.

== Gameplay ==
In Sonic Dash, players select a lane to run in to collect rings and avoid obstacles. Above, in an early version of the game, Sonic the Hedgehog is running in the left lane on a beach.

Sonic Dash is an endless runner, similar to Temple Run (2011) and Rayman Jungle Run (2012). The player directs Sonic or another character through levels, collecting rings and avoiding obstacles and enemies. Unlike other games in the series, Sonic automatically moves forward at all times, similar to Sonic and the Secret Rings. Players are able to share and compete for position on leaderboards.

The game features 3D graphics, including a level set in an environment based on the Seaside Hill level of Sonic Heroes. Rings can be collected throughout the levels or purchased via microtransactions, along with red star rings. Accumulated rings and Red Star Rings can be used to purchase power-ups, upgrades, or unlock additional playable characters. The game also features a mission system, giving players an objective to target as they play the game.

The game features several playable characters from the Sonic universe. Characters are unlocked by purchasing them with Red Star Rings or real-world currency. After the game's release, further updates added additional characters and new features. On October 31, 2013, an update was released that included a boss battle against Zazz, a member of the Deadly Six from Sonic Lost World. A similar boss battle against Doctor Eggman was added in a later update. Several characters from other non-Sega franchises have been added to the game as part of temporary cross-promotional events, available to unlock only during a limited time period. These include the Angry Birds characters Red, Chuck and Bomb during June 2015; the Sanrio characters Hello Kitty, My Melody, Chococat and Badtz-Maru during December 2016; Pac-Man and Ms. Pac-Man in February 2018, and Bongo the Danimals mascot in May 2021. The Android version of the game also features an exclusive character in the form of the Android robot. Content themed around the live-action Sonic the Hedgehog films and IDW comic series has been added, as well as a "Zone Builder" feature.

== Development and release ==
Sonic Dash was developed by Hardlight, a development studio under Sega Europe. Hardlight was founded by Chris Southall, a former Codemasters employee who helped to found Sega Racing Studio. According to Southall, Sega's desire to develop more mobile games led to Hardlight's foundation in 2012. Around the time of Hardlight's relaunch of Sonic Jump in October 2012, the studio was working on Sonic the Hedgehog and Crazy Taxi games. Although initially faced with difficulty deciding which to develop, Sega Sammy Holdings president and chief operating officer (COO) Haruki Satomi saw a demo of Sonic Dash and liked it so much that he insisted it be developed. Southall stated that the concept for Sonic Dash began with looking at elements of Sonic games and deciding what gameplay aspects would work on a mobile phone. He called an into-the-screen running game an "obvious thing" and not unlike some sequences in the console game series.

Sonic Dash was initially scheduled for a Christmas 2012 release, but was delayed to March 2013. In a November 2012 interview with UK toy trade magazine Toys 'n' Playthings, Sega Europe employee Sissel Henno confirmed that Sega would have "several new digital titles" in 2013. On February 28, 2013, the title Sonic Dash was spotted on a listing from a LinkedIn profile. On March 1, 2013, Sega announced the game, with an official press release going out on March 4. The game was announced as an exclusive for mobile phones, with iOS the only platform explicitly mentioned, stating that it would be available on the App Store "soon". Although the game was initially released as a paid application, it was made free-to-play a month later. According to Southall, the decision to make the app free took significant internal discussion. He stated, "Coming from a long console history, the concept of free-to-play for a company like Sega was a hot topic for discussion." An Android version was released on November 26, 2013, and a Windows Phone and PC release occurred on December 3, 2014.

According to Southall in a November 2017 interview, Hardlight was continuing to work on updates for Sonic Dash. In a February 2020 interview, new Hardlight studio manager Neall Jones expressed the studio's surprise at the longevity of Sonic Dash, having been downloaded more than 350 million times and earned more than US$10.1 million. He spoke on the implementation of new features to keep the game interesting, as well as additions from the Sonic the Hedgehog film.

=== Other versions ===
Sonic Dash Extreme is an arcade port of Sonic Dash. It was announced at the IAAPA Attractions Expo in Orlando, Florida, USA in November 2015, and it uses traditional controls instead of touch screen controls.

Sonic Dash+ is a variant of Sonic Dash. It was released on April 5, 2022 for Apple Arcade members, and it requires an active membership to this service and a compatible device with iOS 13/iPadOS 13 or newer. Dash+ is ad-free, and there are no in-app purchases.

Sonic Prime Dash is another variant of Sonic Dash. It was released on July 13, 2023 for Netflix members, to coincide with the second season of Sonic Prime, and it requires an active membership to any Netflix plan. The game requires an Android device with Android 8 or newer, or an Apple device with iOS 15/iPadOS 15 or newer. Prime Dash features a new track, five new characters, two of which are exclusive to Prime Dash, a boss battle which are all from the series Sonic Prime, and a shortcut to Sonic Prime on Netflix, but the game is otherwise ad-free with any plan, and there are no in-app purchases.

== Reception and downloads ==
Reception

Aggregate score
Aggregator	Score
Metacritic	iOS: 69/100

Review scores
Publication	Score
Destructoid	7/10
Edge	5/10
Eurogamer	6/10
IGN	6.1/10
Pocket Gamer	3.5/5
TouchArcade	iOS: 3.5/5
MacLife	4/10
Digital Spy	4/5
Gamezebo	5/5
PCMag UK	3/5

Review aggregator website Metacritic labeled Sonic Dash as having "mixed or average reviews". Scott Nichols of Digital Spy referred to it as "the best Sonic has played on a smartphone yet", while Jim Squires of Gamezebo lauded the game for being "the first time in 20 years that Sega has put out a Sonic game that you absolutely have to play". David Craddock of TouchArcade compared Sonic Dash favorably to the special stages in Sonic the Hedgehog 2.

Chris Carter of Destructoid praised the controls, finding that the "swipe"-based motions worked better than the tilt-based ones typical of the endless runner genre. Edge praised the smoothness of the gameplay and quality of the graphics, but criticized the "cruel" placement of the enemies behind obstacles. Justin Davis of IGN praised the snappy, responsive controls but criticized the enemy placement. Harry Slater of Pocket Gamer said the game's speed makes it more challenging than other endless runners.

Carter criticized the repetitiveness and in-app purchases that ranged from "not needed" to "pretty damn annoying". He described the leaderboard system as "pay-to-win... you can literally pay your way to the top of these leaderboards if you’re willing to spend enough premium red rings". Rich Stanton of Eurogamer felt that the in-app purchases were motivated by greed. Edge said the level design "feels like it was made with in-app Continue purchases specifically in mind". A review for MacLife said Sonic Dash "fumbles the fundamentals and aggravates with heavy-handed in-app purchases".

In March 2013, the game received more than 22.6 million downloads. By June 2015, Sonic Dash had been downloaded over 100 million times across multiple different platforms, and had 14 million players per month. By November 2017, Sonic Dash's download count was over 300 million, and was over 350 million by March 2020. As of April 2020, the game reached 400 million downloads. In September 2021, the download count surpassed 500 million.

== Sequels ==
=== Sonic Boom Dash ===
A sequel based on the Sonic Boom TV series, Sonic Boom Dash (formerly known as Sonic Dash 2: Sonic Boom), was soft-launched on Android devices in Canada on July 1, 2015, and received a full iOS launch in October, along with a later full Android launch. For the iOS version, the game included compatibility with the Apple Watch via a companion app. Like the original game, Sonic Boom Dash has received "mixed or average reviews" according to Metacritic.

=== Sonic Forces ===
A mobile tie-in to Sonic Forces of the same name, originally titled Sonic Forces: Speed Battle, was released in 2017. It features similar gameplay to Sonic Dash, but is based on competitive online multiplayer. Within its first five days of release, Sonic Forces: Speed Battle had been downloaded 1.3 million times, and reached 2 million downloads within its first two weeks. By April 21, 2020, Sonic Forces: Speed Battle had been downloaded over 50 million times and reached US$4.2 million in revenue. Ric Cowley of Pocket Gamer called the game "a lot of fun to play, though it's probably best off experienced in short bursts". Speed Battle had been downloaded over 100 million times. Sonic Forces: Rival Rush, a modified version of Sonic Forces: Speed Battle for Nex Playground's Play Pass subscription, will be released in 2026.
