= Sonic Jump =

2005 video game

- iOS/Android logo
- Developers: Sonic Team (original); AirPlay (original); Hardlight (remake)
- Publisher: Sega
- Series: Sonic the Hedgehog
- Platforms: J2ME, iOS, Android
- Release: Original: JP: February 21, 2005; USA/UK: April 2007; Remake: WW: October 18, 2012; USA: December 21, 2012 (Android)
- Genre: Platform
- Mode: Single-player

Sonic Jump (Note: Japanese: ソニックジャンプ, Hepburn: Sonikku Janpu) is a 2005 vertical platform game developed by AirPlay and Sonic Team, and published by Sega for the digital distribution service Sonic Cafe, initially only available in Japan for mobile phones before being ported to iOS and Android and released in other regions in 2007. Unlike other games in the series, Sonic Jump does not involve running from left to right, but instead, Sonic automatically jumps up the screen, with the player needing to tilt the phone to move him from left to right. The original game's graphical style is based on the Sonic Advance series, which had ended shortly before Jump's release.

Sonic Jump received mixed reviews from critics, who praised the overall presentation but felt the gameplay was dull. In 2012, the game was remade by Hardlight and also released for iOS and Android devices (later retitled Sonic Jump Pro), featuring updated graphics and new gameplay features, the remake received generally positive reviews for its extended length, being frequently compared favorably with Doodle Jump (2009). It was also a success, with the remake being downloaded nearly 9 million times by March 2013. Sega would later publish two sequels, both unrelated to each other, Sonic Jump 2 (2008) and Sonic Jump Fever (2014).

== Gameplay ==
Sonic jumping up Green Hill Zone (original version)

While games in the Sonic the Hedgehog series commonly involve running from side to side, Sonic Jump involves no running, but rather, Sonic jumping through the stages vertically to get to the top of the stage. The player controls Sonic by tilting the device left or right. Sonic jumps automatically, though a "double jump" move can be used upon tapping the touchscreen. Rings are collected throughout the stages, and protect Sonic from damage. In the original version, finishing an act with 50 or more rings would reward the player with a shard of a Chaos Emerald. In the remake, accumulated rings can be used to purchase further content in the game, such as items, upgrades, or additional playable characters. Players can "level up" by achieving certain objectives in each stage; increasing the player's level will allow access to new content for purchase.

The game contains two play modes; "Story Mode", which has preset stages with an end goal, and "Arcade Mode", which has randomly created stages that go on endlessly, with the purpose being to make it as far as possible through the stage.

== Development and release ==
The original Sonic Jump was developed by AirPlay and Sonic Team. Most of the graphics were taken from the Sonic Advance series, which had concluded shortly before the game's release, while the zone themes were taken from the Sega Genesis games. The original version of Sonic Jump was released in Japan on February 21, 2005, for the Sonic Cafe digital distribution service; in April 2007, the game was released internationally for iOS and Android devices as part of the Sega Mobile service, as well as for the T-Mobile Sidekick phone. Sega published the game in all regions.

The new version of the game was first teased by Sega on October 5, 2012. It was then announced and released less than two weeks later on iOS on October 18, 2012, and for Android on December 21, 2012. A short adaptation of Jump was published in issue 5 of the Sonic Super Digest magazine by Archie Comics to coincide with the release of the remake. On March 21, 2018, Sonic Jump was made available for playing on Facebook.

The game's first update, containing the "Blue Sky Zone" of twelve new stages, a new playable character (Amy Rose) was released on November 26, 2012. This update also included a new "Global Challenge" mode, which pools in all player's gameplay height results, with the end goal being able to match the equivalent distance of Earth to the Moon. Completing the global challenge would unlock another character, Blaze the Cat. Another update was released on December 19, 2012, adding Rouge the Bat and Silver the Hedgehog as playable characters, and replaced the sixth stage from each zone with a Boss Act.

== Reception ==
Reception

Aggregate scores
Aggregator	Score
GameRankings	73%
Metacritic	77/100

Review scores
Publication	Score
IGN	5/10 (J2ME); 7.5/10 (iOS)
Pocket Gamer	3/5 (J2ME); 4/5 (iOS)

=== 2005 version ===
The 2005 version of Sonic Jump received mixed reviews from critics, who praised the game's presentation but criticized the overall gameplay. IGN gave the game a 5 out of 10 score, stating the game was "not engaging and "dull" and that "controls seemed sluggish and occasionally inaccurate". Stuart Dredge of Pocket Gamer thought the concept was an "interesting idea", but felt that the controls and high difficulty would not be ideal for newer players.

=== 2012 version ===
The 2012 version received "generally favorable reviews" according to review aggregator website Metacritic, scoring 77/100. On iOS, the game hit over 8.8 million downloads (including free downloads) in North America and Europe after five months, as of July 2013.

Pocket Gamer gave the game an 8 out of 10, praising it for being a "...tough, entertaining vertical platformer that has enough references and stylistic tweaks to make it stand out from the crowd". Slide to Play gave the game a 4 out of 4 "Must Play" rating, especially praising the value in the game's free updates, stating: "Twelve new stages and a new playable character adds up to a meaty chunk of content, and we're glad to see this excellent game get continued love from the developers. They even say advertise another forthcoming update in the game, and we're looking forward to playing that as well. Sonic Jump remains a great buy." IGN gave the game a 7.5 out of 10, praising the game's "quality presentation and solid challenge" and that "the difficulty ramps up at a surprisingly fast pace...like the cutesy climbing equivalent of Super Meat Boy", but criticized Sega's approach to buying unlockables, saying that it takes too long to unlock by gameplay alone, and that buying one's way through the game destroys the competitive aspect of the leaderboards. The game has also received many comparisons to the game Doodle Jump.

== Legacy ==
A sequel to the original version titled Sonic Jump 2 released on May 20, 2008, for then-current mobile devices.

Hardlight later developed Sonic Jump Fever, a sequel to the HD version that adds new features including minigames; it released on July 10, 2014, to mixed reviews. Sonic Jump Fever was downloaded 28.3 million times, but only generated US$600,000 in profits. As of November 7, 2016, the game is no longer available for download, possibly due to the lackluster sales performance.
