= Sonic the Hedgehog in animation =

Several animated television series, web series, and features based on the Sonic the Hedgehog series of video games have been produced.

== Television series/specials ==
Series	Season	Episodes	Originally released		
Series	Season	Episodes	First released	Last released	Network
Adventures of Sonic the Hedgehog	1	65	September 6, 1993	December 3, 1993	First-run syndication
Sonic the Hedgehog	1	13	September 18, 1993	December 11, 1993	ABC
Sonic the Hedgehog	2	13	September 10, 1994	December 3, 1994	ABC
Sonic Underground	1	40	August 30, 1999	October 22, 1999	BKN
Sonic X	1	26	April 6, 2003	September 28, 2003	TV Tokyo
Sonic X	2	26	October 5, 2003	March 28, 2004	TV Tokyo
Sonic X	3	26	March 12, 2005	April 18, 2005	Jetix
Sonic Boom	1	52	November 8, 2014	November 14, 2015	Cartoon Network
Sonic Boom	2	52	November 12, 2016	November 18, 2017	Boomerang
Sonic Prime	1	8	December 15, 2022		Netflix
Sonic Prime	2	8	July 13, 2023		Netflix
Sonic Prime	3	7	January 11, 2024		Netflix

=== Adventures of Sonic the Hedgehog (1993) ===
Adventures of Sonic the Hedgehog was the first Sonic television series, produced by DiC Entertainment, Bohbot Entertainment and Fininvest, and started airing in 1993. The series consisted of 65 episodes, most of which follow Sonic and Tails as they attempt to stop Doctor Robotnik's tyranny. At the end of every episode is a short PSA titled "Sonic Says" where Sonic teaches the audience a lesson. The series has received mixed reviews, although the series has spawned several internet memes and is a major source in YouTube poop material.

Three years after the series completed its original run, a Christmas special titled Sonic Christmas Blast aired on USA Network on November 24, 1996; the special was originally intended to tie-in with Sonic X-treme, and was produced under the title X-tremely Sonic Christmas, however, its cancellation resulted in the special being rebranded as a tie-in to Sonic 3D Blast.

=== Sonic the Hedgehog (1993–94) ===
The second of DiC's Sonic cartoons, Sonic the Hedgehog (more commonly known as Sonic SatAM) aired from September 18, 1993, to December 3, 1994, lasting two 13 episode seasons. Considered one of the darker incarnations of Sonic, SatAM takes place in a time where Robotnik successfully took over Mobius, with Sonic and a team called the Freedom Fighters attempting to take back the planet.

Originally intended to last three seasons, Sonic the Hedgehog was cancelled after its second season, which left the show on a cliffhanger. Since its release, the series has become a cult classic, inspiring a video game titled Sonic Spinball and the Sonic Archie Comics series.

=== Sonic Underground (1999) ===
The third and final DiC Sonic cartoon, Sonic Underground (Note: French: Sonic Le Rebelle, lit. 'Sonic The Rebel') aired in 1999 and lasted only one season with 40 episodes. The series takes inspiration from SatAM. In Sonic Underground, hedgehog Queen Aleena gives birth to triplets: Sonic, Sonia and Manic, on the same day as Robotnik's takeover of Mobotropolis. Based on a prophecy, Aleena separates her three children, who, years later, join a rebellion to take back the planet. Every episode of the show includes a musical number near the end. The series was commissioned as a way to promote the Dreamcast.

Unlike the previous two series, Sonic Underground has been met with a generally negative reception from media critics for its confusing plot, although praise has been given to the series' musical numbers. Originally, a conclusion for the series was planned to be included in issue #50 of the Sonic Universe comic, however, it was later replaced due to license issues.

=== Sonic X (2003–06) ===
Sonic X (Note: Japanese: ソニックX, Hepburn: Sonikku Ekkusu) is a Japanese anime created by TMS Entertainment under a partnership with Sega and Sonic Team. In the series, after an infiltration into Eggman's base goes wrong, Sonic and his friends are transported to a parallel world inhabited by humans where they meet a 12-year-old boy named Christopher Thorndyke, who helps Sonic along with his friends to take on Eggman continuously while trying to retrieve all seven Chaos Emeralds so that they would return home. The series initially ran for two 26 episode seasons on TV Tokyo from April 6, 2003 to March 28, 2004. (Note: Two "trailers" were also produced in 2001 and 2002.)

Internationally, Sonic X was dubbed by 4Kids Entertainment and ran from September 6, 2003, to March 26, 2005. Although the series suffered from low ratings in Japan, it was more successful internationally, with 4Kids commissioning a third season consisting of 26 episodes. Season 3 sees Sonic and his friends traveling across planets to retrieve the Chaos Emeralds to stop an alien race called the Metarex. This season did not air nor receive a home release in Japan until 2020, although it was later made available via streaming services.

The series has received generally average reviews from critics, although the English dub was heavily criticised for its censorship and voice acting. The English voice cast would later become the voice cast for the games from Shadow the Hedgehog to Sonic & Sega All-Stars Racing.

=== Sonic Boom (2014–17) ===
Sonic Boom is an American-French CGI animated series produced by OuiDo! Productions and distributed on Cartoon Network, (Note: All of season one and the first episode of season two, "Tommy Thunder: Method Actor" would air on Cartoon Network, while the rest of the series aired on Boomerang.) Canal J and Gulli. The series revolves around Sonic and his friends attempting to stop Dr. Eggman's plans. It ran from November 8, 2014, to November 18, 2017, having two 52 episode seasons.

The television series is part of a larger spin-off franchise also known as Sonic Boom. According to Takashi Iizuka, head of Sonic Team, Sonic Boom was designed to appeal to Western fans. The series also spans three video games (Rise of Lyric, Shattered Crystal and Fire & Ice), a comic book from Archie and a toyline by Tomy. The series was met with positive reviews.

As of May 21, 2020, showrunner Bill Freiberger confirmed that there are no plans to continue the series.

=== Sonic Prime (2022–24) ===
Sonic Prime is an animated series co-produced by Sega, Netflix Animation, WildBrain and Man of Action Entertainment. It sees Sonic traveling across an accidentally-created multiverse, with themes of self-discovery and redemption. The series was officially announced on February 1, 2021, although its existence was accidentally leaked in December 2020 with a now-deleted Twitter post. The series has three seasons totalling 23 episodes, including a double-length series premiere, released from December 15, 2022, to January 11, 2024. It received generally favorable reviews.

=== Untitled Sonic preschool series ===
On September 14, 2026, it was announced that a Sonic animated series aimed towards preschoolers is in production at Netflix.

== Direct-to-video ==
The first film adaptation of the Sonic series was Sonic the Hedgehog (Note: Japanese: ソニック★ザ★ヘッジホッグ, Hepburn: Sonikku za Hejjihoggu), known internationally as Sonic the Hedgehog: The Movie, a 1996 Japanese two-part original video animation (OVA). It sees Sonic and Tails as they venture through Planet Freedom to stop Metal Robotnik and save the Land of the Sky, soon facing a new enemy, Hyper Metal Sonic.

The film was split into two episodes in Japan, released on January 26 and March 22, before being available in retail on May 31, 1996. An English dub was released internationally on September 7, 1999, to coincide with the release of Sonic Adventure.

== Crossover special ==
=== "Let's Meet Sonic" (2019) ===
Let's Meet Sonic is an episode of the American animated series OK K.O.! Let's Be Heroes. A part of the show's third season, the episode is a crossover with Sonic the Hedgehog and features the titular character as well as Miles "Tails" Prower visiting Lakewood Plaza Turbo. Announced at San Diego Comic-Con 2019, the episode premiered on Cartoon Network on August 4.

== Web series and short films ==
=== Sonic the Animation (1994) ===
Sonic the Animation, colloquially known as Sonic: Man of the Year, is a short film produced by TMS Entertainment. The short features Dr. Robotnik, enraged at Sonic winning a "Man of the Year" award, trying to ruin the hedgehog's public image. The short was included as a bonus feature in the Sega Saturn game compilation Sonic Jam.

=== Sonic: Night of the Werehog (2008) ===
Sonic: Night of the Werehog is the first web animation and 3D computer-animated short, released on November 21, 2008, and produced by Marza Animation Planet, created to promote the release of Sonic Unleashed. In the short, Sonic and Chip enter a haunted house and must contend with the two ghosts Su and Uh, who attempt to take pictures of scared visitors to appease the female ghost Lah.

The three ghosts that appeared in the short film were created by Marza Animation Planet, as the studio's illustration staff members created various illustrations that featured them are posted on Marza Animation Planet's Staff Twitter account.

On October 31, 2023, a brand new short film, featuring the three ghosts, entitled "Ghost Tale", was posted on Marza Animation Planet's YouTube channel.

=== Sonic Mania Adventures (2018) ===
Sonic Mania Adventures is the second web animation and first 2D one, initially released as a series in five parts between March 31 and July 18, 2018, as a tie-in to Sonic Mania Plus. The series takes place shortly after the events of Sonic Forces, as Classic Sonic arrives back in his world to find Eggman is once again attempting to collect all the Chaos Emeralds. It was produced by Neko Productions and animated by Tyson Hesse, with supervision from Sega.

The series received generally favorable reviews from various critics, who praised the animation and writing. A Christmas-themed bonus episode, starring Amy Rose, was released on December 21, 2018, a few months after its initial completion.

=== Papercraft Mania Adventures (2019) ===
Papercraft Mania Adventures is a 2 episode stop-motion papercraft animation released in January and February 2019, inspired by Sonic Mania Adventures.

=== Team Sonic Racing Overdrive (2019) ===
Team Sonic Racing Overdrive is a 2D two-part series released in March and April 2019. The miniseries is a promotional tie-in to Team Sonic Racing, and features Sonic, Shadow, and Amy's teams competing in a race on Planet Wisp while Dr. Eggman tries to interfere.

=== Chao in Space (2019) ===
Chao in Space is a 2D short released on December 13, 2019. In the short, a Chao dreams up the events of a fictional film titled Chao in Space, in which it endures a spaceship battle against a Dark Chao. As it sleeps, Sonic attempts to prevent the sleepwalking Chao from injuring itself, while Dr. Eggman disguises himself as Santa Claus to try to steal Christmas presents. The animation is based on a gag from Sonic Adventure and Sonic Adventure 2, which both feature faux advertisements for Chao in Space and its sequel Chao in Space 2.

=== Sonic Colors: Rise of the Wisps (2021) ===
Sonic Colors: Rise of the Wisps is a 2D two-episode miniseries released in Summer 2021, created as a tie-in to the release of Sonic Colors: Ultimate. The series takes place during the game, and follows Sonic and Tails as they work to save the Wisps imprisoned on Sweet Mountain from Metal Sonic, Orbot and Cubot.

=== TailsTube (2022–present) ===
TailsTube is an online YouTube web series starring Miles "Tails" Prower, who acts as a VTuber and host for the show. The show is described as a "fun and informative, Tails-hosted show about all things Sonic". The series' episodes are published irregularly, with 16 having been released as of July 2026.

=== Sonic Frontiers Prologue: Divergence (2022) ===
Sonic Frontiers Prologue: Divergence is a 2D short released on November 1, 2022. The short was written by Ian Flynn and directed by Tyson Hesse, with animation by Powerhouse Animation Studios. Set shortly before the events of Sonic Frontiers, the short follows Knuckles on Angel Island, explaining how he was sent to the Starfall Islands.

=== Sonic & Friends (2023–present) ===
Sonic & Friends is a 3D computer-animated series released on Sega's Japanese TikTok account and featuring chibi versions of Sonic characters that originated from Sonic Boom merchandise. The teaser was released on August 7, 2023.

=== Sonic Superstars: Trio of Trouble (2023) ===
Sonic Superstars: Trio of Trouble is a 2D short released on September 20, 2023. The short is a prequel to Sonic Superstars and features Doctor Eggman, Fang the Hunter, and Trip the Sungazer searching a ruin as part of a villainous plot. Beforehand, Fang dreams of an encounter with Sonic and his friends.

=== Sonic x Shadow Generations: Dark Beginnings (2024) ===
Sonic x Shadow Generations: Dark Beginnings is a three-episode miniseries that serves as a prequel to the events of Shadow Generations. Revealed at Anime Expo 2024, the series sees Shadow travelling to the Space Colony Ark, believing that Black Doom has been resurrected, while experiencing flashbacks to his past time on the Ark with Maria Robotnik. Other characters who appear include Rouge the Bat, E-123 Omega, and Emerl.

=== Chao Tales (2025) ===
Chao Tales is a 2025 8-episode animated web series that focuses on Sonic visiting a Chao Garden throughout the year. The series features Sonic alongside an arrogant Shadow Chao. A Halloween-themed bonus episode was released in October 2025.

=== Sonic Racing: CrossWorlds - The Animation (2025) ===
Sonic Racing: CrossWorlds - The Animation is an animated short released on August 29, 2025, and as a tie-in to Sonic Racing: CrossWorlds. It focuses on Shadow the Hedgehog as he pursues eliminating everyone else in a race. The short was nominated for Best Sponsored at the 53rd Annie Awards.

=== Sonic the Hedgehog: Memories and Beyond (2026) ===
Sonic the Hedgehog: Memories and Beyond is an animated short released on November 12, 2026, as part of the franchise's 35th anniversary celebration. It follows Sonic and his friends having to fight Metal Sonic when Doctor Eggman upgrades him through Sonic's stolen life-data and the Chaos Emeralds, and them deciding to channel their memories to override Metal Sonic's programming. The short was announced at an Anime Expo 2026 panel focusing on the production of Sonic animation. A trailer was released on October 9, 2026, which also announced the release date of the short.

=== Sonic the Hedgehog x McLaren Racing: Beyond Fast (TBA) ===
Sonic the Hedgehog x McLaren Racing: Beyond Fast is a three-episode miniseries based on the collaboration between the Sonic franchise and the McLaren Racing team. A teaser trailer was released on November 16, 2026.

== See also ==
- Sonic the Hedgehog (film series)
- List of Sonic the Hedgehog printed media
- List of Sonic the Hedgehog video games
- List of Sonic the Hedgehog characters
- List of television programs based on video games
