= Sonic Boom (TV series) =

CGI-animated television series

- Genre: Animated sitcom
- Based on: Sonic the Hedgehog by: Yuji Naka; Naoto Ohshima; Hirokazu Yasuhara
- Developed by: Evan Baily; Donna Friedman Meir; Sandrine Nguyen
- Showrunners: Evan Baily; Bill Freiberger
- Directed by: Natalys Raut-Sieuzac
- Voices of: Roger Craig Smith; Mike Pollock; Colleen O'Shaughnessey (Note: Credited as Colleen Villard); Travis Willingham; Cindy Robinson; Nika Futterman; Kirk Thornton; Wally Wingert
- Music by: Michael Richard Plowman
- Countries of origin: United States; France
- Original language: English
- No. of seasons: 2
- No. of episodes: 104 (list of episodes)

Production
- Executive producers: Sandrine Nguyen; Boris Hertzog; Donna Friedman Meir; Jane E. McGregor; Evan Baily; Bill Freiberger (Note: Co-executive producer, season 1)
- Editors: Natalys Raut-Sieuzac; Benjamin Schrepf (season 1)
- Running time: 11 minutes
- Production companies: Sega of America, Inc.; Technicolor Animation Productions (Note: Credited as OuiDo! Productions for season 1); Lagardère Thématiques; Jeunesse TV

Original release
- Network: Cartoon Network & Boomerang (U.S.); Canal J & Gulli (France)
- Release: November 8, 2014 – November 18, 2017

Related
- Adventures of Sonic the Hedgehog; Sonic the Hedgehog; Sonic Underground; Sonic X Sonic Prime

Sonic Boom is an animated sitcom produced by Sega of America, Inc. and Technicolor Animation Productions (formerly OuiDo! Productions in season 1) in collaboration with Lagardère Thématiques and Jeunesse TV, respectively for Cartoon Network, Boomerang, Canal J, and Gulli, It is loosely based on the Sonic the Hedgehog video game series by Sega, the fifth animated television series based on the franchise, and the first to be produced in both computer animation and high-definition.

The series premiered in November 2014. It is a part of the Sonic Boom spin-off franchise, which also consists of three video games: Rise of Lyric, Shattered Crystal, and Fire & Ice; a comic series by Archie Comics, and a toyline by Tomy. In spite of the games' critical and commercial failure and the mixed response to the character redesigns, the series gained a cult following online for its witty and self-referential humor.

== Premise ==
The series focuses on the adventures of Sonic the Hedgehog, Miles "Tails" Prower, Amy Rose, Knuckles the Echidna and newcomer Sticks the Badger. They reside in a tropical jungle. Each episode mainly features a stand-alone plot and comedic elements.

== Episodes ==
Season	Episodes	Originally released		
Season	Episodes	First released	Last released	Network
1	52	November 8, 2014 (U.S.) November 19, 2014 (France)	November 14, 2015 (U.S.) September 30, 2015 (France)	Cartoon Network (U.S.) Canal J/Gulli (France)
2	52	October 29, 2016 (U.S.) April 8, 2017 (France)	November 18, 2017 (U.S.) March 9, 2018 (France)	Boomerang (U.S.) Canal J/Gulli (France)

== Characters ==
=== Main ===
Sonic Boom features characters that were re-designed for Western audiences. From left to right: Sticks (a new character to the series), Knuckles, Sonic, Amy and Tails

Sega confirmed various cast and characters for Sonic Boom on February 25, 2014. On May 29, 2014, Sega announced that Nika Futterman would play the role of Sticks, a jungle badger, who joined the franchise as a major character. Numerous new characters were also created for Sonic Boom. Jack Fletcher works as the show's voice director, a role he has also held for the video game series since 2010.

- Sonic the Hedgehog (voiced by Roger Craig Smith) is Team Sonic's leader in the series, a blue hedgehog with super speed. Sonic is good-natured and brave, but can be inconsiderate of others' feelings, sarcastic and impatient. He also enjoys the benefits of being a hero and dislikes competition. Unlike most incarnations, the Sonic Boom version of Sonic has blue-furred arms and wears a brown neckerchief around his neck and athletic sports tape on his wrists and shoes.
- Miles "Tails" Prower (voiced by Colleen O'Shaughnessey (Note: Credited as Colleen Villard)) is a two-tailed yellow fox who is Sonic's sidekick and best friend and the youngest of the group. He sports goggles and a tool belt and serves as the group's mechanic and technology expert. Tails' inventions do not always work out as intended, though he is highly competent and self-sufficient in combat. He maintains the same personality overall, though he can be immature and cynical at times.
- Amy Rose (voiced by Cindy Robinson) is a pink female hedgehog who is the peppiest member of the group. Amy wields a giant hammer in battle. Just like her main-series counterpart, Amy has a crush on Sonic. However, unlike her portrayal in other Sonic media, Boom Amy tries to keep her feelings a secret, and often shows visible embarrassment when those feelings are alluded to. Eggman has referred to her and Sonic as if they were a married couple, and to Amy as Sonic's girlfriend. She is the most emotionally mature member of the group, offering common sense when the rest of the team gets carried away, though she can be temperamental and self-righteous.
- Knuckles the Echidna (voiced by Travis Willingham) is a red echidna and the nature-loving muscle of Team Sonic, whose redesign for Sonic Boom is the most drastic of any Sega character altered for the series; Knuckles is physically taller than most versions of the character, appears more muscular and wears sports tape around his hands as opposed to spiked boxing gloves. While his original counterpart is depicted as a reserved and naive figure prone to trickery, Boom Knuckles is depicted as a brave but dim-witted and incompetent figure with little self-awareness to the annoyance of his friends, though he serves as a source of the series' self-referential humor.
- Sticks the Badger (voiced by Nika Futterman) is a paranoid and feral badger, skilled in the use of boomerangs and bō staffs, who comes from the jungle. While she is usually depicted as extremely hot-headed as a result, her paranoia does allow her to find solutions to problems more easily. She is also legally the owner of the village due to her ancestry to the former mayor, Jebadiah Badger.
- Doctor Eggman (voiced by Mike Pollock) is a mad scientist who is the constant nemesis of Sonic. In this series, Eggman is typically portrayed as an idiotic and egomaniacal person. At times he appears to be on friendly terms with the heroes, though this usually leads to some scheme in which he tries to defeat them. His ambitions are to conquer the island in order to build his own theme park. Despite this, he occasionally makes effort to conform to the Hedgehog Village's rules for his own intentions, with his unsuccessful schemes being considered to be annoyances rather than actual threats.
- Orbot (voiced by Kirk Thornton) and Cubot (voiced by Wally Wingert) are Eggman's robot henchmen. Orbot is red and orb-shaped, while Cubot is yellow and cube-shaped. Neither of them are especially malicious or competent (though Orbot appears to be more intelligent than Cubot by some margin), but they follow through with Eggman's schemes anyway.

=== Recurring ===
- Belinda (voiced by Colleen O'Shaughnessey) is a goat and resident of Hedgehog Village who is Charlie's wife. When Charlie turns to villainy she encourages her husband and in turn begins expressing villainous tendencies of her own.
- Beth (voiced by Colleen O'Shaughnessey) is a sweet shrew who will look up to anyone for any of their positive traits. She also felt sorry for Eggman when he transformed into a creature by becoming angry.
- Charlie (voiced by Kirk Thornton) is a desert rat and an archaeologist living in Hedgehog Village. Knuckles briefly tries to assist him to make up for a past misdeed, but his frustration at Knuckles' incompetence, which eventually causes him to lose yet another job, drives him to become a villain, equipping himself with an ancient exo-suit. In "It Takes a Village to Defeat a Hedgehog", Charlie is among the villains recruited by Doctor Eggman to join Team Eggman.
- Comedy Chimp (voiced by Bill Freiberger) is a chimpanzee resident of Hedgehog Village who hosts his own late-night talk show with his co-host Wolf Sidekick.
- D-Fekt (voiced by Wally Wingert) is a former Eggman robot capable of manipulating objects using eco-magnets. After becoming overloaded with power and losing control, D-Fekt was given to Team Sonic, who reprogrammed him as an ally. D-Fekt first appeared in Sonic Boom: Fire & Ice before appearing during the series' second season.
- Dixon (voiced by Wally Wingert) is a ferret and media producer. He frequently uses shady tactics in order to drive up ratings.
- Mayor E. Pluribus Fink (voiced by Mike Pollock) is a mouse who is the mayor of Hedgehog Village. He often prioritizes maintaining his own political position above all else.
- Jebadiah Badger was the former mayor of Hedgehog Village and great-great grandfather of Sticks. He was a ruthless businessman that seized absolute power by exploiting and manipulating the legal system. He forced citizens and villagers out of their homes for land to expand on his fortune. Eventually, the former citizens and ancestors of the current residents of Hedgehog Village rebelled and chased him out of town.
- Fastidious Beaver (voiced by Mike Pollock) is a beaver and resident of Hedgehog Village who works as the librarian. He has a tendency to correct other characters' grammar and frequently begins his sentences by saying "Actually".
- The Gogobas are a tribe of chinchillas who live in Gogoba Village on Bygone Island. They make up for their small size with devious manipulation through kindness and guilt-trips.
  - Chief Gogoba (voiced by Wally Wingert) is the leader of the Gogobas.
  - Young Gogoba (voiced by Roger Craig Smith)
  - Elderly Gogoba (voiced by Cindy Robinson)
- Lady Walrus (voiced by Bill Freiberger) is a walrus living in Hedgehog Village. She has two sons, Stratford and Chumley, with a running gag involving the infant Chumley persistently being put into danger as a result of Dr. Eggman's attacks.
- Leroy (voiced by Kirk Thornton) is a turtle who serves as a postal worker and mail carrier for Bygone Island.
- The Lightning Bolt Society are a secret society of villains made up of small-time crooks, though they are largely considered incompetent and harmless by the villagers and Doctor Eggman. In "It Takes a Village to Defeat a Hedgehog," the Lightning Bolt Society is among the villains recruited by Doctor Eggman to join Team Eggman.
  - Willy Walrus (voiced by Wally Wingert) is a walrus who is one of the members of in the lightning bolt society.
  - Dave the Intern (voiced by Roger Craig Smith) is a nutria and employee at the Meh Burger fast-food restaurant in the Village Center. He is Eggman's biggest fan and was briefly taken on as the Doctor's intern, but was later fired after he proved too ambitious. Dave later appeared as a founding member of the Lightning Bolt Society. In "Next Top Villain," it is revealed that Dave's mother is also evil and pressures Dave to be a better villain.
  - Weasel Bandits (all voiced by Travis Willingham), as their name implies, a group of three weasel bandits. Sometimes, only one of them is present among the Lightning Bolt Society.
  - The Chameleon (voiced by Kirk Thornton) is a gray wolf dressed as a tree and the leader of the lightning bolt society and serves as the Lightning Bolt Society's spy and talent scout.
- Metal Sonic is a robotic doppelgänger of Sonic created by Eggman.
- Mighton (voiced by Wally Wingert) and Bolts (voiced by Mike Pollock respectively) are heroic alien robots from Roboken. Mighton is the main hero of Roboken. Bolts is Mighton's sidekick and a main hero of Roboken.
- Morpho (voiced by Roger Craig Smith) is a shapeshifting robot built by an alternate-dimension Eggman. After his own dimension is destroyed, he migrates to the Sonic Boom dimension and pledges allegiance to Eggman. He most frequently appears in the guise of Eggman's fictional brother, "Steve Eggman".
- Salty (voiced by Kirk Thornton) is a hippopotamus who works as a bouncer. In Rise of Lyric, he acts as a sea captain and has a strong rivalry with his twin brother Pepper.
- Shadow the Hedgehog (voiced by Kirk Thornton) is an evil black hedgehog capable of super speed and teleportation. Idolized by Doctor Eggman for his popularity within the series, he is much more aggressive and vengeful than other incarnations of the character, considering friendship a sign of weakness and determined to destroy Team Sonic and cause disaster to the world at all costs. In the TV series, Shadow has extended red Markers on both his shoes and gloves and has cow-licked quills like Sonic.
- Soar (voiced by Travis Willingham) is a blue eagle and local newscaster on Bygone Island, who also hosts seminars as a motivational speaker and life coach.
- T.W. Barker (voiced by Kirk Thornton) is a gray wolf who acts as the ringmaster at "T.W. Barker's Circus of Wonders" where its performers are actually his slaves. In "Don't Judge Me," T.W. Barker worked as Doctor Eggman's lawyer when it came to suing Sonic for the injuries that were afflicted onto Doctor Eggman. In "It Takes a Village to Defeat a Hedgehog," T.W. Barker is among those who were invited by Doctor Eggman to join Team Eggman.
  - Stuntbears are a trained brown bear and gray bear duo that serve as T.W. Barker's loyal henchmen, stunt performers and circus performers. In "It Takes a Village to Defeat a Hedgehog," the Stuntbears are among those who were invited by Doctor Eggman to join Team Eggman.
- Tommy Thunder (voiced by Wally Wingert) is a tiger and a famous martial arts action movie star. His real name is Irwin Fertelmeister. An egomaniac whose good looks and wealth have gone to his head. A method actor that presents himself as the macho hero who in reality is easily frightened.
- Mrs. Vandersnout (voiced by Colleen O'Shaughnessey) is an elderly wolf living in Hedgehog Village. Despite her seemingly innocent appearance, she has repeatedly demonstrated dishonest and immoral behavior such as scamming the team out of their money and suggesting Sonic be poisoned.
- Vector the Crocodile (voiced by Keith Silverstein) is a private detective and reality TV star. Like the other game characters, he has been redesigned for the series, now sporting an arm tattoo and a leather jacket in place of his traditional headphones.
- Zooey (voiced by Colleen O'Shaughnessey) is a fox residing in Hedgehog Village, whom Tails has a crush on.

== Production ==
The CGI-animated series was first announced on October 2, 2013, revealing a teaser image featuring Sonic the Hedgehog, Miles "Tails" Prower, Knuckles the Echidna and Amy Rose, in silhouette form. The series, which consists of 52 11-minute episodes, was developed by Evan Baily, Donna Friedman Meir and Sandrine Nguyen, with Baily and Bill Freiberger as showrunners, under the supervision of Sonic Team head Takashi Iizuka. On February 6, 2014, Sega revealed the first trailer for the series, showcasing the new designs for the characters.

The series features returning voice actors from the video game series, including Roger Craig Smith as Sonic, Travis Willingham as Knuckles, Cindy Robinson as Amy, Mike Pollock as Doctor Eggman, Kirk Thornton as both Orbot and Shadow and Wally Wingert as Cubot respectively, while voice actress Colleen Villard succeeds Kate Higgins in the role of Tails. The series also introduces a new character named Sticks the Badger, a somewhat-delusional hunter who has been living alone in the wilderness for many years before meeting Sonic and his friends, who is voiced by Nika Futterman. In an interview with Polygon, Iizuka stated the series came about as a desire to appeal more to Western territories, following the 2003 Japanese anime series, Sonic X, with Iizuka also stating that the franchise will run in parallel with the 'Modern' series of Sonic games. Baily stated that the series would be a mixture of action and comedy, featuring an episodic structure. On October 4, 2014, Sega announced the air date of the series in the United States to be November 8, 2014, on Cartoon Network.

On February 19, 2015, Cartoon Network announced in a press statement that Sonic Boom, along with 10 other shows, was to return for the 2015–2016 TV season. This was subsequently confirmed by executive producer Bill Freiberger in a fan commentary to not be an indicator of a renewal or second season at this time. However, on October 10, 2015, Lagardère Entertainment Rights announced a second season which premiered on October 29, 2016. It was announced on November 10, 2016, that the remainder of season two would air on Boomerang while Cartoon Network airs reruns of the series.

Season 1 of Sonic Boom was released in Japan as a Netflix-exclusive on July 1, 2017, under the title Sonic Toon (ソニックトゥーン).

As of 2026, there are no plans to continue the show past its two-season run.

== Broadcast ==
Sonic Boom made its international debut on Cartoon Network in Australia and New Zealand on April 4, 2015. In the United Kingdom and Ireland, the series premiered on Boomerang on June 1, 2015, and premiered on Pop on 25 August 2018. The series is also airing on Cartoon Network in Singapore and Malaysia, on Cartoon Network in India as Sonic Boom Dhamaal Aur Dhoom, on Okto (later Okto on 5) in Singapore, and on Minika GO Channel in Turkey. It also aired on Boomerang in the United States from October 8, 2015, to November 12, 2017. The series premiered on Family CHRGD in Canada on October 24, 2015. It has also been acquired by the English-language feed of Cartoon Network in Africa as well as the English and Arabic-language feeds in the Middle East.

== Home media ==
=== United Kingdom, France, and Brazil ===
Throughout 2016, the UK and French branches of Universal Pictures Home Entertainment released four 13-episode volumes of the series which all make up the first season. They were also released for digital download. Universal later released the first two volumes in Brazil in 2017.

DVD name	Episodes	Release date	Ref.
The Sidekick	13	February 8, 2016 (UK); April 12, 2016 (FR); 2017 (BR)	
Hedgehog Day	13	April 12, 2016 (FR); May 30, 2016 (UK); 2017 (BR)	
Mayor Knuckles	13	July 25, 2016 (UK); September 27, 2016 (FR)	
No Robots Allowed	13	September 27, 2016 (FR); October 10, 2016 (UK)	

=== United States ===
==== Streaming ====
On May 22, 2016, the first season was available to stream on Hulu in the United States, under a deal with Sega and OuiDo! Productions. The series was later made available for streaming on Netflix outside of the United States as of December 23, 2016. The second season of the show was added to Hulu on November 19, 2017. As of January 31, 2023, Netflix has both seasons available in the US. The series is also available on Tubi.

==== Home media ====
The launch edition of the game Sonic Boom: Fire & Ice for the Nintendo 3DS included a Sonic Boom DVD with three episodes from season 1.

NCircle Entertainment later secured the rights to release the series, releasing it in separate volumes and later complete series sets.

Release	Format	Season(s)	Episodes	Release date	Note(s)	Ref.
Here Comes the Boom!	DVD	1	8	March 12, 2019		
Go Team Sonic!	DVD	1 and 2	9	June 4, 2019		
Season 1, Volume 1	DVD	1	26	October 1, 2019	Also came in a Limited Edition set with Sonic and Dr. Eggman action figures.	
Season 1, Volume 2	DVD	1	26	February 4, 2020	Also came in a Limited Edition set with Tails and Knuckles action figures. In the release, the episode "Fire in a Crowded Workshop" has Spanish audio regardless of the audio setting. Customers had to reach out to NCircle Entertainment to obtain a replacement disc.	
Robot Uprising	DVD	2	8	September 1, 2020		
Season 2, Volume 1	DVD	2	26	May 4, 2021	Also came in a Limited Edition set with a Sonic backpack clip.	
The Complete Season 1	Blu-Ray	1	52	May 4, 2021		
Season 2, Volume 2	DVD	2	26	September 21, 2021		
The Complete Season 2	Blu-Ray	2	52	September 21, 2021		
The Complete Series	Blu-Ray	1 and 2	104	March 8, 2022	Released in standard and Steelbook versions.	
Super Pack	DVD	1 and 2	68	September 13, 2022	Single case re-release of the first two Season 1 volumes and the Complete Season 2 releases.	

== Reception ==
Ben Gibbons of Screen Rant defined it as an easy-watchable fun show driven by a colorful cast of characters, but despite humor being Sonic Boom's strong suit "the less serious tone means other Sonic stories rank above it". Emily Ashby of Common Sense Media said that it was somewhat violent for children but that some viewers can have fun watching it. Patrick Lee of The A.V. Club called it the first great Sonic cartoon in over 20 years, finding the updated cast of characters to be "a good fit for a hangout show".

In a scene of the "Eggman's Anti-Gravity Ray" episode, Amy boasts about proving that a woman can be just as good of an athlete as a man, prompting Knuckles to tell her that when "someone calls attention to the breaking of gender roles" it "undermines the concept of gender equality", by implying an "exception", rather than a "status quo". Knuckles then proclaims himself to be a feminist. Charles Hall of Polygon praised this scene as having a progressive message for children.

=== Awards and nominations ===
Year	Award	Category	Nominee	Result	Ref.
2016	Universal Film Festival	Best Animation	Marlene Sharp	Nominated	
2017	Chico Independent Film Festival	Best Animation	Natalys Raut-Sieuzac	Won	
2017	TV France International Export Awards	Animation		Nominated	
2017	Teen Choice Award	Choice Animated TV Show		Nominated	

== In other media ==
=== Video games ===
A pair of video games that serve as prequels for the series were released for the Wii U and Nintendo 3DS systems in November 2014. The Wii U version, Sonic Boom: Rise of Lyric, was developed by Big Red Button Entertainment and the 3DS version, Sonic Boom: Shattered Crystal, by Sanzaru Games. The games were announced alongside the TV series' first trailer on February 6, 2014, and serve as prequels to the series. Rise of Lyric sees players alternate control between Sonic, Tails, Knuckles and Amy. The game utilizes each of their abilities—Sonic's speed, Tails' flight, Knuckles' strength and Amy's agility—allowing two players to play cooperatively and four players competitively. Shattered Crystal lets players control Sonic, Tails, Knuckles and Sticks and places more emphasis on platforming and puzzle-solving than the more adventure-oriented Rise of Lyric. Rise of Lyric received absolute critical lambastment and became notable for its mostly negative reception from critics, who criticized its gameplay, story, low quality visuals, level design and glitches. On June 20, 2014, it was confirmed that both games would be released on December 18 in Japan under the name of Sonic Toon. A third game, Fire & Ice, was for Nintendo 3DS in September 2016. Sonic Dash 2: Sonic Boom, a follow-up to the free-to-play Sonic Dash, was released on Android devices on July 1, 2015. Since her debut in the show, the character Sticks has gone on to be featured and mentioned in peripheral Sonic titles that are not part of the Boom brand, such as Sonic Runners, Mario & Sonic at the Rio 2016 Olympic Games, and Sonic Frontiers.

=== Books ===
In early 2016, a series of children's books adapted from several Sonic Boom episodes were released in France by Hachette under the Bibliothèque Verte collection.

=== Comics ===
Cover of the first issue of the comic

A comic based on the new franchise by Archie Comics was released beginning in October 2014, with Ian Flynn as the writer and Evan Stanley as the artist, similar to Archie's long-running Sonic the Hedgehog comic series. Several issues were also written by TV series showrunner Bill Freiberger. Jesse Schedeen of IGN rated the first issue of the comic a 7.2 out of 10. He commended Flynn for not having relied on nebulously defined "trendy, modern humor or dialogue" in the comic's presentation and also appreciated the fourth-wall humor and "clean, expressive" art style. Schedeen did, however, find the plot fairly disjointed and possessing little coherent structure and he criticized Sticks, whom he considered a needless exposition device.

The Sonic Boom comics were featured alongside Archie's Sonic the Hedgehog, Sonic Universe and Mega Man comics, as well as various other Sega and Capcom video game series as part of the 2015 Sonic/Mega Man crossover "Worlds Unite", with issues #8-#10 forming parts 2, 6 and 10 of the story. The series concluded with its 11th issue in September 2015, though stories featuring the characters continued to be printed as part of the Sonic Super Digest and Sonic Super Special Magazine books. Flynn and Stanley later began writing for the television series during its second season.

== See also ==
- Sonic the Hedgehog in animation
