= Loddlenaut =

2023 adventure simulation video game

- Developer: Moon Lagoon
- Publisher: Secret Mode
- Designers: Ricardo Escobar; Jin-Young Sohn
- Programmer: Ricardo Escobar
- Artists: Jin-Young Sohn; Glo Wan
- Writers: Ricardo Escobar; Jin-Young Sohn
- Composer: Ryan Yoshikami
- Platforms: Windows; macOS; Nintendo Switch
- Release: Windows, macOS; November 16, 2023; Nintendo Switch; September 19, 2024
- Genres: Cozy; adventure; simulation
- Mode: Single-player

Loddlenaut is a 2023 cozy adventure simulation video game developed by American independent studio Moon Lagoon and published by Secret Mode. Set on a polluted alien ocean planet, the game involves exploring underwater environments, collecting and recycling waste, and restoring habitats for aquatic creatures called loddles. It combines environmental cleanup with virtual pet mechanics, allowing players to raise and care for the creatures.

Development began in 2019 as a thesis project at the New York University Game Center. The game was released for Windows and macOS on November 16, 2023, and for the Nintendo Switch on September 19, 2024.

Loddlenaut received generally favorable reviews. Critics praised its relaxing atmosphere and cleaning mechanics, although some found the gameplay repetitive and the creature-raising systems underdeveloped.

== Gameplay ==
Loddlenaut is a single-player game in which the player controls an interstellar custodian sent to GUP-14, an ocean planet polluted by the former operations of a corporation called GUPPI. The player's task is to remove waste and contamination from the planet's underwater environments and restore its habitats.

The main cleaning tool is a bubble gun, which collects floating trash and removes pollution from surfaces. Collected waste can be deposited in recycling machines to obtain materials for crafting equipment and upgrades. New tools become available as the player progresses, allowing different types of contamination to be removed.

Exploration is limited by the player's oxygen supply, which can be replenished through underwater plants or portable oxygen stations. Players can upgrade their oxygen capacity and equipment to reach more distant areas. There is no combat, and running out of oxygen returns the player to their home base.

Players also encounter loddles, aquatic creatures resembling axolotls, which can be rescued from polluted areas. Loddles need to be cleaned, fed, and provided with suitable habitats. Their diet affects how they develop, with different foods producing different forms. Players can name their loddles, craft toys for them, and release them into restored habitats. An in-game catalogue called the Loddlepedia records the different forms players have discovered.

Players can continue exploring and caring for loddles after completing the main objectives. Pollution can return to previously cleaned areas, although players can grow plants that prevent this.

== Development ==
An axolotl, which inspired the design of the loddles

Loddlenaut began as a thesis project by Ricardo Escobar and Jin-Young Sohn at the New York University Game Center in August 2019. After graduating in May 2020, they founded Moon Lagoon, an independent studio based in Austin, Texas, to develop the project into a commercial game. They received support from the Alfred P. Sloan Foundation.

The developers initially conceived the game as an underwater pet simulation inspired by Tamagotchi and the Chao Garden from Sonic Adventure 2. The design of the loddles was inspired by axolotls, whose unusual appearance, ability to regenerate limbs, and capacity for metamorphosis appealed to the developers. They also drew on Subnautica and Abzû when designing the underwater environments. According to Escobar, early versions included more survival mechanics inspired by Subnautica, but these were reduced as development progressed.

The environmental cleanup mechanics were introduced after the developers looked for an activity that would encourage players to explore between caring for their loddles. Escobar recalled that an instructor's comment about cleaning and restoration in games such as House Flipper led them to adopt this approach. Cleaning subsequently became the main activity, while the creature-raising systems were retained. The developers also omitted some features inspired by the Chao Garden, including competitions between creatures.

The game's music was composed by Ryan Yoshikami, and Glo Wan provided 2D artwork. Sound design and implementation were handled by several contributors.

== Release ==
Loddlenaut was announced during the 2021 Wholesome Direct showcase and funded through a Kickstarter campaign in July of that year. In May 2022, British publisher Secret Mode announced that it would publish the game for Windows and macOS. It was released through Steam on November 16, 2023.

Moon Lagoon and Secret Mode partnered with the marine conservation charity Whale and Dolphin Conservation. Before the game's release, they published a promotional video documenting a beach cleanup. Secret Mode also pledged to donate £0.05 for each net sale of Loddlenaut during the first three years following its initial release.

A free update released in June 2024 introduced the Loddlepedia, which allows players to track discovered loddle forms. It also added new creature behaviors, movement improvements, and an autosave system.

A Nintendo Switch version was announced in August 2024. Moon Lagoon worked with PlayEveryWare on the port. Escobar explained that optimization was complicated by the game's construction as a single continuous level, with creatures and plants simulated even when outside the player's view. The developers addressed this by reducing simulation activity in certain areas and hiding objects that were not visible to the player.

The Switch version was released on September 19, 2024, alongside a free update titled Goddles for all platforms. The update added Goddle Grotto, an underwater area containing three ancient loddles, and a gardening system that allows players to grow plants that prevent pollution from returning to cleaned areas. It also introduced equipment upgrades and a global pollution tracker.

== Reception ==
Reception

Aggregate scores
Aggregator	Score
Metacritic	77/100
OpenCritic	67% recommend

Review scores
Publication	Score
Nintendo Life	8/10
Comfy Cozy Gaming	9/10

Loddlenaut received generally favorable reviews, according to Metacritic, which reported a weighted average score of 77 out of 100 for the Windows version, based on eight reviews. OpenCritic reported an average score of 81 out of 100, with 67% of critics recommending the game.

Reviewers described the game as a relaxing experience, particularly its underwater setting, lack of combat, and emphasis on cleaning and caring for creatures.

Roland Ingram of Nintendo Life gave the Switch version 8 out of 10, praising its atmosphere and responsive controls. He found the repeated cleaning of previously restored areas and the continuing needs of the loddles less enjoyable. Ingram also noted a contrast between the game's peaceful atmosphere and its story about corporate pollution. Hope Bellingham of GamesRadar+ enjoyed cleaning the ocean and raising loddles, although she found that the limited oxygen supply sometimes interrupted exploration.

Ashley Collins of Comfy Cozy Gaming gave the game 9 out of 10, praising its artwork, music, and cleaning mechanics. Her main criticism concerned the frequent journeys required to deposit collected materials at the home base, particularly because fast travel points became available only after an area had been cleaned.

SM Reine of The Geekiary compared Loddlenaut to a combination of PowerWash Simulator and Lil Gator Game, praising its relaxing cleaning mechanics and environmental themes. Reine considered the game suitable for younger players, although its reliance on written dialogue could make it less accessible to children who cannot yet read. They also noted its short length and the optional nature of its creature-raising activities.
