= Brawl in the Family (The Simpsons) =

- The Simpsons episode
- Episode no.: Season 13; Episode 7
- Directed by: Matthew Nastuk
- Written by: Joel H. Cohen
- Production code: DABF01
- Original air date: January 6, 2002

Guest appearances
- Jane Kaczmarek as Judge Constance Harm; Delroy Lindo as Gabriel

Episode features
- Couch gag: The couch is replaced by a hedge. A gardener comes in and creates a topiary of The Simpsons.
- Commentary: Al Jean; Joel H. Cohen; Max Pross; Delroy Lindo; Matt Warburton; David Silverman

Episode chronology
← Previous "Viva Ned Flanders" "She of Little Faith"	Next → "Sweets and Sour Marge"
- The Simpsons season 13

"Brawl in the Family" is the seventh episode of the thirteenth season of the American animated television series The Simpsons. It first aired on the Fox network in the United States on January 6, 2002. In the episode, the Simpsons get arrested for domestic violence, prompting social worker Gabriel to move in and make the family functional. After the family is declared acceptable, Amber and Ginger, the cocktail waitresses Homer and his neighbor Ned Flanders married in Las Vegas, show up at their doorsteps. This episode is the first episode of Season 13's DABF production line.

"Brawl in the Family" was directed by Matthew Nastuk and was the first full episode Joel H. Cohen received a writing credit for. It was the first episode on which Al Jean served as sole showrunner. The idea for the episode was pitched by Jean, who wanted to produce a sequel to the season 10 episode "Viva Ned Flanders", which he thought had a "loose end". The episode features Jane Kaczmarek as Judge Constance Harm, and Delroy Lindo as Gabriel.

It is also the first non-Treehouse of Horror episode since "Bart the Mother" in Season 10 to not use the full-length opening sequence; instead, this particular episode uses the shortened variation that begins with Homer pulling up to the driveway.

In its original broadcast, the episode was seen by approximately 12.8 million viewers, making it the 28th most watched program the week it aired.

Later that year, the episode was nominated for an Environmental Media Award in the category "Television Episodic - Comedy", which it ultimately lost to the Dharma & Greg episode "Protecting the Ego-System". Following its home video release, "Brawl in the Family" received mixed reviews from critics.

== Plot ==
After the Republican Party of Springfield successfully repeals most of the city's environmental laws, the resulting spike in air pollution causes an acid rainstorm, destroying the Simpsons' TV antenna and prompting them to stay inside and play a game of Monopoly to pass the time. When it is revealed that Bart has been cheating by using Lego bricks as hotel pieces, Bart threatens Lisa and Homer assaults him. Marge and Lisa try to pry them apart. Despite her inability to talk, Maggie calls the police on her family before taking hold of Marge and attempting to pull her off Homer. With help from an edible taffy-like substance and a robot, the entire Simpson family is arrested for causing a domestic disturbance.

After a short time in jail, they are released by a social worker named Gabriel, whom Homer continuously dismisses as an angel sent from Heaven. Gabriel moves in with the family to help them be functional again. After observing the family's quirks, Gabriel takes the family to a forest and diagnoses the family's problems accordingly: Marge tries to prove her self-worth to the family by medicating them with food, Bart is addicted to doing crazy stunts for attention, Lisa has a savior complex brought on by her ill-fated attempts to do good for the family, and Homer is simply a drunken buffoon. Gabriel then sets up a challenge to teach the Simpsons the importance of teamwork by setting up a picnic basket in a tree. The object is for the family to work together as a team to get it down, but when Gabriel mentions that there is beer, Homer foolishly uses the family car to knock the tree down, trapping Gabriel in the process. After a harrowing rescue involving Bart driving the car and Homer nearly becoming prey for wild predators, the Simpsons succeed and Gabriel congratulates them on working together as a family and becoming functional during their drive home.

Before the family can call it a day, they arrive home and find Amber and Ginger waiting in their driveway, causing Gabriel to storm off in disgust. Amber shows Marge and the kids video footage of a drunk Homer marrying her in Vegas, while Ginger is next door with the widowed Ned Flanders. Homer tries to get his marriage to Amber annulled by the court, but Judge Constance Harm refuses, stating that the marriage still stands, since polygamy is legal in Nevada and Homer never officially divorced Amber. Marge is so angry that she banishes Homer, who takes up residence in Bart's treehouse with Amber, who attempts to seduce him by making him sandwiches, arousing Marge's jealousy. Amber also unsuccessfully tries to bond with Bart and Lisa, who resent her for destroying their family. Homer still loves Marge and refuses to sleep with Amber, so he tries to sleep in Santa's Little Helper's kennel, but ends up getting its doorway stuck to his head and spends the rest of the night trying to get it off, as Marge watches from the window and begins to have a change of heart. The next day, Marge finds Homer asleep amid the broken remains of the doghouse, and asks him to come inside to talk with her, although she is still angry at him over what he did.

While Amber is lounging in a kiddie pool, she overhears Homer and Marge arguing about her, with Homer ultimately announcing that he is leaving Marge and the kids. Homer then invites Amber to Moe's for a night of drinking, while Marge and the kids eavesdrop from outside. The next day, a hungover Amber discovers that she is now married to Grampa Simpson, and the Simpsons have video evidence of the event about her vowing to forsake all other husbands when married to Grampa. Amber and Ginger, who is fed up with Ned and the Flanders' sickeningly sweet demeanour, hurriedly drive back to Vegas. The family celebrates their victory through sticking together, while Grampa, at first despondent over Amber leaving him, quickly learns to be content with it.

== Production ==
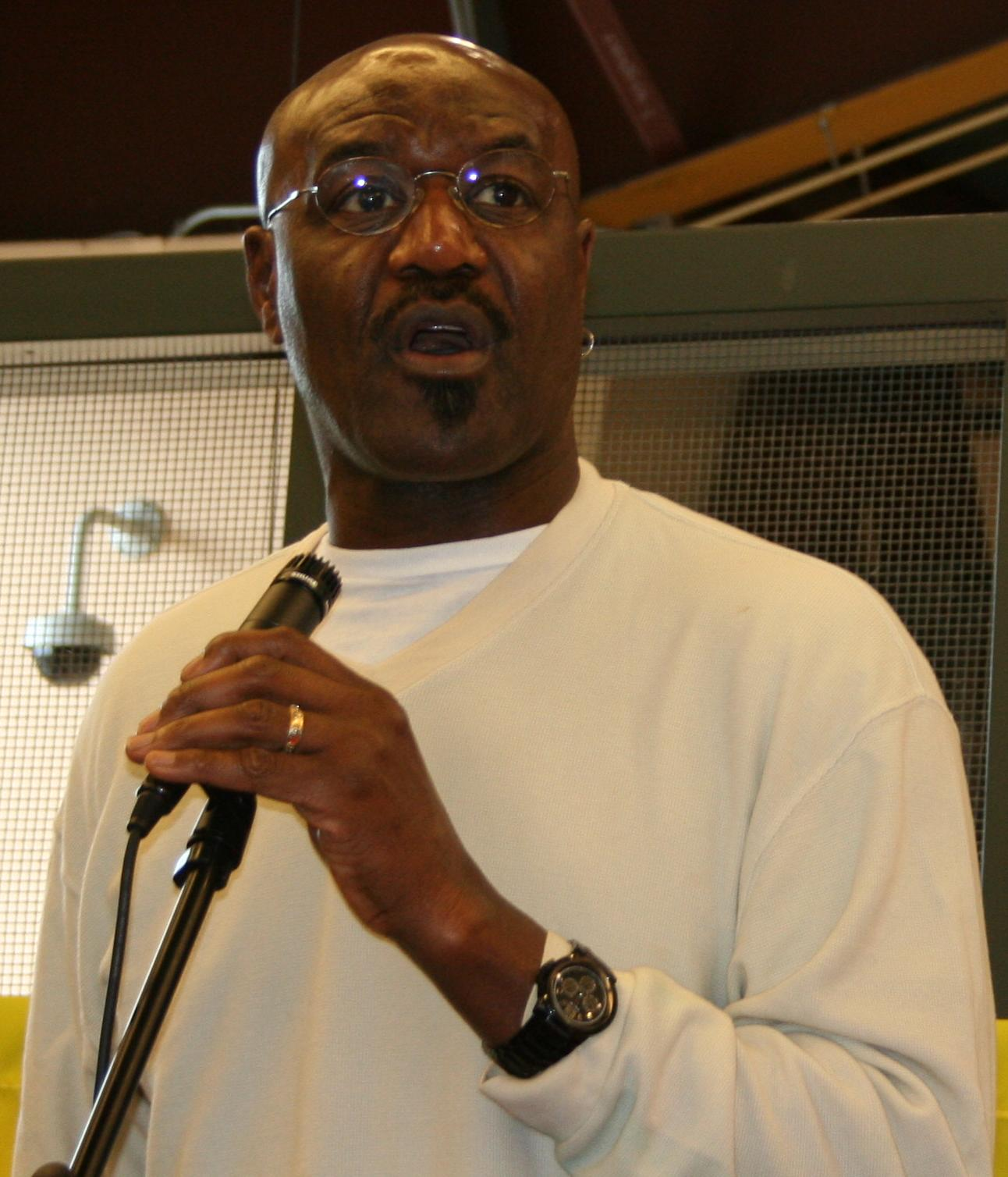
Actor Delroy Lindo, who guest-starred as Gabriel in the episode, was dissatisfied with the character's design.

"Brawl in the Family" was directed by Matthew Nastuk and was the first episode Joel H. Cohen received a sole writing credit for. Cohen had previously received a credit for "Hex and the City", the first segment of "Treehouse of Horror XII" which aired the previous year. "Brawl in the Family" originally aired on January 6, 2002, on the Fox network. It was the first episode for which current showrunner Al Jean served as sole showrunner. It was the second of his episodes to air however, since the Christmas-themed "She of Little Faith", the second episode he produced, was chosen to air first as it would coincide with the holiday. The idea for the episode was pitched by Jean, who wanted to make a follow-up to the season 10 episode "Viva Ned Flanders". In it, Homer takes Ned to Las Vegas to teach him how to have fun. While there, the two get intoxicated and wake up the next morning to find that they have married two cocktail waitresses, Amber and Ginger. The episode ends with Homer and Ned walking home from Vegas. Jean felt that the ending to "Viva Ned Flanders" was "a bit loose" because "...if you leave a wife in Vegas, they track you down." He pitched "Brawl in the Family" in order to "resolve it [the ending to 'Viva Ned Flanders']." Amber and Ginger were portrayed by Pamela Hayden and Tress MacNeille respectively.

"Brawl in the Family" features British actor and theater director Delroy Lindo as Gabriel, the social worker. According to Jean, Lindo was chosen to guest star because of his "great voice." Gabriel was then designed to match Lindo's voice. In the DVD commentary for the episode, Lindo expressed dissatisfaction with the character's design. He said "Were I an audience member, looking at this [the episode] I'd think, 'That guy doesn't sound like he looks.'" However, he added that his appearance in the episode earned him "much cred" among his nieces and nephews. In an interview with The A.V. Club, he said "After I did that voiceover, I was very aware of the power of The Simpsons, because in certain quarters, I got instant credibility." The episode also features Jane Kaczmarek as Judge Constance Harm.

== Release ==
On its original American broadcast on January 6, 2002, "Brawl in the Family" was watched by approximately 12.8 million viewers, according to Nielsen Media Research. It became the 28th most watched program of the week it aired, beating such shows as ABC's 8 Simple Rules and NBC's Crossing Jordan and Mister Sterling.

Later that year, the episode was nominated for an Environmental Media Award in the category "Television Episodic - Comedy", which it ultimately lost to the Dharma & Greg episode "Protecting the Ego-System". Its nomination was based solely on a scene in which "a bigger fish eats a smaller three-eyed fish", according to Jean, and because the award show was short on nominees. On August 24, 2010, "Brawl in the Family" was released as part of The Simpsons: The Complete Thirteenth Season DVD and Blu-ray set. Al Jean, Joel H. Cohen, Max Pross, Delroy Lindo, Matt Warburton and David Silverman participated in the audio commentary of the episode.

Following its home video release, "Brawl in the Family" received mixed reviews from critics. Aaron Peck of High-Def Digest criticized the episode for being unoriginal, writing "Homer is always doing something that jeopardizes his marriage to Marge. When Homer's 'Vegas Wife' shows up unexpectedly [...] the same thing happens. This is a storyline that has worn out its welcome, but it still continues." 411Mania's Ron Martin described the episode as having a "ridiculous set up". Andre Dellamorte of Collider thought negatively of the episode as well, calling it "Mannered to the point of ridiculousness." While he didn't consider it the worst episode he's ever seen, he criticized the episode's pacing and lack of satire, writing "it’s just that the plates spin so fast and so pointlessly that it becomes just about the gags. [...] the satire is gone; it’s just incident after incident to set up gags (some of which are funny) and get the show to an end time."

Writing for DVD Movie Guide, Colin Jacobson wrote that the episode "seems like two story fragments combined into one; it’s like the writers couldn’t flesh out either tale for an entire 22 minutes so they just stuck two half-programs together." He added that it still "manages some laughs", and also argued that the episode was very similar to the season 1 episode "There's No Disgrace Like Home", which was also noted by Ryan Keefer of DVD Talk. Despite receiving mixed reviews, "Brawl in the Family" is often considered a fan favourite, and R. L. Shaffer of IGN called it one of the season's "gems".
