= List of Sonic Boom episodes =

Sonic Boom is an animated television series produced by Sega of America, Inc. and Technicolor Productions in collaboration with Lagardère Thématiques and Jeunesse TV, respectively for channels Cartoon Network, Canal J, and Gulli. The series follows the adventures of Sonic, Tails, Knuckles, Amy, and Sticks, who all try to foil Doctor Eggman's evil plans to take over their island in order to build his own theme park. The series premiered on Cartoon Network in the United States on November 8, 2014, on Canal J and Gulli on November 19, 2014, and on Boomerang in the United Kingdom on June 1, 2015. The series aired 104 episodes, with each being 11 minutes long.

The second season first premiered on Cartoon Network on October 29, 2016, while the rest of the season started airing on Boomerang on November 12, 2016. The second season concluded on November 18, 2017, and there have been no plans to continue the show since then.

== Series overview ==
Season	Episodes	Originally released		
Season	Episodes	First released	Last released	Network
1	52	November 8, 2014 (U.S.) November 19, 2014 (France)	November 14, 2015 (U.S.) September 30, 2015 (France)	Cartoon Network (U.S.) Canal J/Gulli (France)
2	52	October 29, 2016 (U.S.) April 8, 2017 (France)	November 18, 2017 (U.S.) March 9, 2018 (France)	Boomerang (U.S.) Canal J/Gulli (France)

== Episodes ==
=== Season 1 (2014–15) ===
No.	Title	Written by	Storyboarded by	American air date	French air date	U.S. viewers (in millions)
1	"The Sidekick"	Story by : Mark Banker; Teleplay by : Mark Banker and Doug Lieblich	Jordi Valbuena & Mickael Merigot	November 8, 2014	November 19, 2014	1.15
Tails is injured after his plane crashes during a battle with Eggman's new creation Burnbot. After firing Tails following concerns about his safety, Sonic begins to look for a replacement.
2	"Can an Evil Genius Crash on Your Couch for a Few Days?"	Doug Lieblich	Gaston Jaunet	November 8, 2014	November 19, 2014	1.15
While his fortress is being repaired, Eggman stays with Sonic but is eventually proven to be the worst roommate ever, relentlessly keeping awake Sonic and Tails as they increasingly become tired.
3	"Translate This"	Dave Polsky	Jordi Valbuena	November 15, 2014	November 19, 2014	1.02
Tails' new translator device, named U.T., begins to cause problems and conflicts among his friends when it starts reading their thoughts out loud, and after it is swapped with a decoy device by Orbot and Cubot, Tails will need to save it–by himself.
4	"Buster"	Eric Trueheart	Jordi Valbuena	November 15, 2014	November 19, 2014	1.02
When Sticks' friends tell her to be nicer to animals, she becomes attached to a slime-belching robot dog named Buster.
5	"My Fair Sticksy"	Doug Lieblich	Jean-Charles Andre	November 19, 2014	November 22, 2014	1.12
After being invited to the "Awardy Award" Ceremony, Sticks admits she does not know how to behave like a lady, so Amy decides to teach her.
6	"Fortress of Squalitude"	Mitch Watson	Jean-Charles Andre	November 22, 2014	November 22, 2014	1.12
When Eggman's lair is selected to appear on the cover of "Modern Lair Magazine", he asks Amy to help him redecorate.
7	"Double Doomsday"	Story by : Mark Banker and Alan Denton & Greg Hahn; Teleplay by : Alan Denton & Greg Hahn	Jean-Charles Andre	November 29, 2014	December 10, 2014	0.89
Eggman decides to take on an intern named Dave to assist him, but Dave's evil ambitions prove more dangerous than expected.
8	"Eggheads"	Story by : Jean-Christophe Derrien and Romain van Liemt; Teleplay by : Romain van Liemt	Gaston Jaunet	December 6, 2014	December 10, 2014	1.00
Eggman bakes up some "evil cookies", which turn Knuckles, Amy, Sticks and Tails into Eggman's henchmen upon eating one. Sonic must find a way to get his friends back.
9	"Guilt Tripping"	Adam Beechen	Gaston Jaunet	January 17, 2015	December 17, 2014	0.92
After Sonic and Tails save the Gogoba Village from the Weasel Bandits, the Gogobas constantly guilt-trip them into staying there.
10	"Dude, Where's My Eggman?"	Alan Denton & Greg Hahn	Jordi Valbuena	January 24, 2015	December 17, 2014	1.10
Orbot and Cubot wake up to find Eggman missing, with no recollection of the previous day's events, and must retrace their steps to find him.
11	"Cowbot"	Story by : Tom Pugsley; Teleplay by : Tom Pugsley and Alan Denton & Greg Hahn	Jean-Charles Andre	January 31, 2015	December 24, 2014	1.10
Sonic has no choice but to protect Eggman after Tails accidentally reprogrammes a cow robot, named Cowbot, after it was intended to attack Sonic, it is to instead take revenge on its creator, that just happens to be Eggman.
12	"Circus of Plunders"	Story by : Mark Banker; Teleplay by : Mark Banker and Alan Denton & Greg Hahn	Jean-Charles Andre	February 7, 2015	December 24, 2014	0.94
While Tails temporarily leaves the group after a failed invention jeopardizes a mission, Sonic and friends agree to take up roles as stand-in performers at T.W. Barker's circus.
13	"Unlucky Knuckles"	Dave Polsky	Patrick Schwerdtle	February 14, 2015	January 14, 2015	1.11
When Knuckles begins suffering an extreme streak of bad luck, he begins searching for ways to shift the balance of luck back in his favor.
14	"The Meteor"	Story by : Romain van Liemt and Jean-Christophe Derrien; Teleplay by : Romain van Liemt	Jean-Francois Galataud	February 21, 2015	January 21, 2015	0.94
A purple meteor with mysterious energy powers causes Sonic the Hedgehog and Dr. Eggman to switch brains, and Sonic must warn his friends before Eggman can use his brain for evil.
15	"Aim Low"	Alan Denton & Greg Hahn	Patrick Schwerdtle	February 28, 2015	January 14, 2015	1.18
When Eggman fails to defeat Sonic and his friends, he hires Soar the Eagle as his life coach to improve himself.
16	"How to Succeed in Evil Without Really Trying"	Dan Milano	Jean-Charles Andre	March 7, 2015	January 21, 2015	1.11
When Tails' new machine destroys a local orchard, angering his friends, the Lightning Bolt Society invite Tails to join their organization. Tails, not realizing their evil purposes, joins the group.
17	"Don't Judge Me"	Reid Harrison	Patrick Schwerdtle	March 14, 2015	February 11, 2015	0.87
When Eggman fakes a broken neck after a battle, he sues Sonic for damages and sends him to court. Amy is out of town at a bee-keeping seminar, so Knuckles serves as Sonic's lawyer as T.W. Barker prosecutes him.
18	"Dr. Eggman's Tomato Sauce"	Alan Denton & Greg Hahn	Gaston Jaunet	March 21, 2015	February 11, 2015	0.90
Eggman creates his own unique brand of tomato sauce and becomes a celebrity chef thanks to it. But Sonic and his friends can't shake their suspicions of something not being right.
19	"Sole Power"	Thomas Barichella	Jordi Valbuena	March 28, 2015	February 18, 2015	0.90
When Sonic's speed produces a deafening tone and no one can determine the cause, he must turn to Eggman for help.
20	"Hedgehog Day"	Joelle Sellner	Jordi Valbuena	April 4, 2015	February 18, 2015	0.86
Eggman's new machine causes him to be trapped in a time-loop, reliving the same day endlessly, and he must get help from Sonic and friends to stop it.
21	"Sleeping Giant"	Douglas Tuber & Tim Maile	Jean-Francois Galataud	April 11, 2015	March 11, 2015	1.02
When Sonic and Knuckles wake up a sleeping rock giant, the gang needs to find a way to put it back to sleep and to save Sticks, who was grabbed by the rock giant.
22	"The Curse of Buddy Buddy Temple"	Doug Lieblich	Patrick Schwerdtle	April 18, 2015	March 11, 2015	0.90
After Sonic and Eggman get trapped in the Buddy Buddy Temple, they have no choice but to cooperate in order to escape.
23	"Let's Play Musical Friends"	Natalys Raut-Sieuzac	Jordi Valbuena	April 25, 2015	April 1, 2015	0.83
Eggman befriends a living virus named Nominatus, but when he invades Eggman's equipment, Orbot and Cubot must venture into the cyber-world to stop him.
24	"Late Fees"	Freddie Gutierrez	Jean-Francois Galataud	May 2, 2015	April 1, 2015	1.07
With seven minutes until the library closes, Sonic hurries to return Amy's library book before she gets fined, but things keep getting in the way.
25	"Into the Wilderness"	Reid Harrison	Hugues Malety-Fischer	May 9, 2015	April 1, 2015	1.05
Sticks seeks to teach Amy survival skills, leading Sonic and Knuckles to challenge them to a race through the jungle.
26	"Eggman Unplugged"	Reid Harrison	Jordi Valbuena	May 16, 2015	April 8, 2015	1.00
After his latest failure, Eggman swears off technology for good, but when the Lightning Bolt Society stage their own attack on the village, Sonic and his friends have to get Eggman's lair back up and running.
27	"Chez Amy"	Reid Harrison	Jean-Charles Andre	July 13, 2015	April 8, 2015	0.96
Frustrated with the service at Meh Burger, the only restaurant in the village, Amy decides to establish her own restaurant, gaining some unlikely help from Eggman.
28	"Blue with Envy"	Doug Lieblich	Jordi Valbuena	July 14, 2015	April 8, 2015	1.24
A shrew named Swifty arrives in town and becomes popular with the villagers, but Sonic is suspicious of his motives.: The English version of this episode first aired in the United Kingdom on June 9, 2015.
29	"Curse of the Cross Eyed Moose"	Natalys Raut-Sieuzac	Patrick Schwerdtle	July 15, 2015	April 22, 2015	1.27
When Sticks encounters a cross-eyed moose, she believes she and her friends are now cursed, so they set out to find a mystical marmoset to remove it.: The English version of this episode first aired in Australia on June 27, 2015.
30	"Chili Dog Day Afternoon"	Reid Harrison	Christophe Malcombe	July 16, 2015	April 22, 2015	1.45
Knuckles gets more than he bargained for when he sets out to find a one-of-a-kind pepper worth helping him win the village's annual Chili Dog Cook-Off.
31	"Closed Door Policy"	Eric Trueheart	Patrick Schwerdtle	July 17, 2015	May 6, 2015	1.49
After learning her friend is a pack rat, Amy forces Sticks to have a garage sale. During the sale, they accidentally set free a horde of Froglodytes locked in a cave within Sticks' burrow.: The English version of this episode first aired in the United Kingdom on June 4, 2015.
32	"Mayor Knuckles"	Reid Harrison	Patrick Schwerdtle	July 20, 2015	May 6, 2015	1.26
Knuckles becomes the temporary mayor while Mayor Fink is out of town, but his new policies cause chaos throughout the village.
33	"Eggman the Auteur"	Sam Freiberger	Jordi Valbuena	July 21, 2015	May 20, 2015	1.37
After Sonic interrupts Eggman directing a film detailing his and Sonic's rivalry, he offers to let Sonic play himself. Sonic turns him down so Eggman casts Dave the Intern for the role instead. After his bumbling portrayal, Sonic interrupts filming again and Eggman offers the role to Sonic again, which Amy accepts in his stead, claiming Sonic as her client.
34	"Just a Guy"	Alan Denton & Greg Hahn	Jean-Charles Andre	July 22, 2015	May 20, 2015	1.12
After Sonic calls Mike the Ox "just a guy", Amy sets up a seminar to help him develop a more sensitive attitude.
35	"Two Good to Be True"	Charles-Henri Moarbes	Patrick Schwerdtle	July 23, 2015	June 3, 2015	1.14
In an alternate dimension, Knuckles is the leader of the team. An accident during a fight with his Eggman causes the alternate Knuckles to end up in the normal dimension, and Team Sonic works to get the alternate Knuckles back to his reality.
36	"Beyond the Valley of the Cubots"	Benoit Grenier	Jean-Francois Galataud	July 24, 2015	August 29, 2015	1.13
After Cubot discovers several prototypes of himself that were rejected by Eggman, he stays to protect them from Eggman with Sonic and Tails' help.
37	"Next Top Villain"	Reid Harrison	Hugues Malety-Fischer	August 1, 2015	August 29, 2015	0.62
Seeking to prove himself as a supervillain, Dave the Intern traps Eggman and takes over his army of robots.
38	"New Year's Retribution"	Reid Harrison	Jordi Valbuena	August 8, 2015	June 3, 2015	0.79
Desperate to defeat Sonic at least once before the end of the year, Eggman slows down time to challenge Sonic one last time.
39	"Battle of the Boy Bands"	Alan Denton & Greg Hahn	Jeremy Corbeaux	August 15, 2015	August 29, 2015	0.65
When Amy and Sticks become obsessed with the pop star Justin Beaver, Sonic, Tails and Knuckles start up a boy band to break his influence over them.
40	"Tails' Crush"	Reid Harrison	Jordi Valbuena	August 22, 2015	August 29, 2015	0.81
After Tails falls in love with a fox named Zooey, each one of his friends give him a not-so-ideal advice for a relationship. Meanwhile, Eggman has trouble picking up a package at the post office, and when Zooey is grabbed by one of Eggman's robots, Tails will be have to save her.
41	"Bro-Down Showdown"	Charles-Henri Moarbes	Jean-Francois Galataud	August 29, 2015	August 30, 2015	0.76
When they accidentally ruin Amy's couch, Sonic and Knuckles enter a game show for best friends to win a new one, but end up on separate teams.
42	"Late Night Wars"	Reid Harrison	Hugues Malety-Fischer	September 5, 2015	August 30, 2015	0.72
After inadvertently becoming a popular celebrity after putting a damaged trash can on his head, Knuckles takes over Comedy Chimp's late-night show.
43	"Fire in a Crowded Workshop"	Natalys Raut-Sieuzac	Jordi Valbuena	September 12, 2015	August 30, 2015	0.73
Sonic, Knuckles and Amy seemingly start a fire in Tails' workshop trying to help an injured Perci, with each telling different interpretations of the story.
44	"It Wasn't Me, It Was the One-Armed Hedgehog"	Reid Harrison	Jean-Francois Galataud	September 19, 2015	August 30, 2015	0.95
When Sonic is framed for stealing from Eggman and the villagers, he and Knuckles each begin a search to find the true culprit.
45	"Robot Battle Royale"	Story by : Romain van Liemt; Teleplay by : Benoit Grenier	Jean-Charles Andre	September 26, 2015	August 31, 2015	0.87
After being led to believe invention is his true calling, Knuckles challenges Tails to enter a local robot battle tournament.
46	"No Robots Allowed"	Story by : Sam Freiberger and Phaea Crede & Justin Shatraw; Teleplay by : Phaea Crede & Justin Shatraw	Jean-Charles Andre	October 3, 2015	August 30, 2015	0.61
Faced with eviction by the homeowner's association, Eggman must convince them that there are no robots in his lair.
47	"Fuzzy Puppy Buddies"	Reid Harrison	Patrick Schwerdtle	October 10, 2015	August 31, 2015	0.73
Amy and Eggman begin bonding in secret over their shared love of the Fuzzy Puppies strategy game.
48	"Designated Heroes"	Reid Harrison	Hugues Malety-Fischer	October 17, 2015	September 6, 2015	0.72
Forcing each member of Team Sonic to battle him one at a time, Eggman begins tricking each member into defeating themselves.
49	"Role Models"	Reid Harrison	Jean-Charles Andre	October 24, 2015	September 5, 2015	0.71
An image specialist named D.B. Platypus forces Sonic and friends to change their behavior in order to set a better example for the children of the village.
50	"Cabin Fever"	Reid Harrison	Hugues Malety-Fischer	October 31, 2015	August 31, 2015	0.61
A thunderstorm forces Sonic and friends to take shelter at Amy's house, but they are driven apart after reading her play manuscript based on their lives.
51	"Counter Productive"	Benoit Grenier	Patrick Schwerdtle	November 7, 2015	September 20, 2015	0.83
Knuckles attempts to aid Charlie the archaeologist to make up for a past transgression, but his constant bungling pushes Charlie over the edge.
52	"It Takes a Village to Defeat a Hedgehog"	Alan Denton & Greg Hahn	Jeremy Corbeaux	November 14, 2015	September 20, 2015	0.69
Eggman gathers all of the island's villains together to defeat Team Sonic, while Shadow attempts to do the same on his own.

=== Season 2 (2016–17) ===
- Starting this season, all of the new episodes now air on Boomerang.

No. overall	No. in season	Title	Written by	Storyboarded by	American air date	French air date	U.S. viewers (in millions)
53	1	"Tommy Thunder: Method Actor"	Alan Denton & Greg Hahn	Jordi Valbuena	October 29, 2016 (Note: This episode premiered on Cartoon Network prior to Boomerang. The episode aired on Boomerang on November 12, 2016.)	April 8, 2017	0.56
Sonic lets Tommy Thunder, a martial arts movie star, follow him around and observe his "hero-process". However, things get bad when Tommy's over-the-top ego clashes with Sonic's and starts claiming credit for the team's battles.
54	2	"Spacemageddonocalypse"	Joelle Sellner	Jeremy Corbeaux	November 19, 2016	April 8, 2017	0.18
A meteor hurtles toward the Earth and Sonic and his friends must find a way to stop it before it's too late.
55	3	"Nutwork"	Sam Freiberger	Jean-Charles Andre	November 26, 2016	April 15, 2017	0.11
When the local news station fails to report on a water crisis, Sticks starts a pirate radio station to expose the truth.
56	4	"Alone Again, Unnaturally"	Benoit Grenier	Patrick Schwerdtle	December 3, 2016	April 22, 2017	0.09
Tails' Ultrasonic Speed Amplifier device causes Sonic to disappear after going too fast, and be trapped in another plane of existence. The team must think of a way to get him back.
57	5	"The Biggest Fan"	Doug Lieblich	Hugues Malety-Fischer & Clemence Liberge	December 10, 2016	April 29, 2017	0.15
Sonic lets Mark the Tapir, a fanatical, self-proclaimed "number-one fan", become his personal assistant, but Mark eventually goes too far.
58	6	"Anything You Can Do, I Can Do Worse-er"	Ian Flynn	Gael Leroux & Jeremy Klein	December 17, 2016	May 6, 2017	0.19
Believing himself too good to be trapped, Sonic challenges Tails to come up with a way to catch him.
59	7	"I Can Sea Sonic's Fear from Here"	Natalys Raut-Sieuzac	Jordi Valbuena	December 24, 2016	May 13, 2017	0.11
When Eggman concocts a plan where Sonic will have to fight him underwater, the hedgehog must overcome his hydrophobia in order to stop him.
60	8	"In the Midnight Hour"	Paul Shriver	Patrick Schwerdtle	December 31, 2016	May 20, 2017	0.12
One night, Sticks discovers a mysterious figure indoctrinating the village, but the gang thinks it's just Sticks' paranoia.
61	9	"Multi-Tails"	Marine & Cedric Lachenaud	Jean-Charles Andre	January 7, 2017	May 27, 2017	0.14
Tails uses a machine to separate himself into five different Tails to multiply his brain productivity, but each piece only comes out with a small portion of his brain power, causing problems for his friends and Eggman.
62	10	"Strike!"	Marie Beardmore	Hugues Malety-Fischer & Clemence Liberge	January 14, 2017	June 3, 2017	0.11
Tired of being abused by Eggman, Orbot and Cubot go on strike and convince the other robots to join them.
63	11	"The Evil Dr. Orbot"	Benoit Grenier	Jordi Valbuena	January 21, 2017	June 10, 2017	0.14
When Eggman fails a test to get his license for evil, he uses Orbot as his front, but Orbot turns evil and goes angry with power.
64	12	"Knuck Knuck! Who's Here?"	Natalys Raut-Sieuzac	Gael Leroux & Jeremy Klein	January 28, 2017	June 17, 2017	0.14
While battling Eggman, Knuckles suffers amnesia. When reminded that he's the last of his kind, he sets out to find a foster family.
65	13	"Mech Suits Me"	Alan Denton & Greg Hahn	Jeremy Corbeaux, Hugues Malety-Fischer, & Selena Piques	February 4, 2017	June 24, 2017	0.13
Sonic stumbles upon an ancient mech suit. It makes him more powerful, but soon he becomes dependent on it, and it starts to change his personality.
66	14	"FiendBot"	Alan Denton & Greg Hahn	Jean-Charles Andre	February 11, 2017	July 1, 2017	0.15
Eggman builds a new robot to defeat Sonic. He programs it to know everything about the Blue Blur, but things don't go as planned.
67	15	"Og Man Out"	Ian Flynn	Hugues Malety-Fischer & Clemence Liberge	February 18, 2017	July 8, 2017	0.13
The gang is suspicious when Froglodyte Og emerges above the surface from underground. Their suspicions are proven true when the Froglodyte army attacks.
68	16	"Knine-to-Five Knuckles"	Benoit Grenier	Hugues Malety-Fischer & Clemence Liberge	February 25, 2017	July 15, 2017	0.16
When Knuckles wins a lamp in a raffle, he realizes he doesn't have a home to keep it, leading him to buy a house.
69	17	"Blackout"	Natalys Raut-Sieuzac	Jordi Valbuena	March 4, 2017	July 22, 2017	0.18
When the Village's power source, the Meroke Crystal, dies, the gang must get a replacement from a deadly trap built by the Ancients.
70	18	"Unnamed Episode"	Benoit Grenier	Gael Leroux & Selena Piques	March 11, 2017	July 29, 2017	0.09
The Unnamed Village's residents turn on Sticks after learning that their village was formerly named after her evil ancestor.
71	19	"Robot Employees"	Anne Baraou	Jeremy Klein	March 18, 2017	August 5, 2017	0.14
Dr. Eggman creates a new line of robot employees for Meh Burger, but there is more to these robot employees than meets the eye.
72	20	"Give Bees a Chance"	Cindy Robinson	Jean-Charles Andre	March 25, 2017	August 12, 2017	0.08
Amy adopts one of Eggman's Bee-Bots after nursing it back to health. Eggman is unhappy with this and tries to reclaim it.
73	21	"Mombot"	Joelle Sellner	Hugues Malety-Fischer & Milena Mardos	April 1, 2017	August 19, 2017	0.14
Feeling the need for unconditional love, Eggman creates "Mombot"... but she's overly critical and embarrasses him in front of Sonic.
74	22	"Muckfoot"	Kevin Burke & Chris "Doc" Wyatt	Gael Leroux & Milena Mardos	April 8, 2017	August 26, 2017	0.13
Tails sets out on a course to prove that Muckfoot, a mythical creature, is real.
75	23	"Nominatus Rising"	Natalys Raut-Sieuzac	Gael Leroux & Lola Etrivert	April 15, 2017	September 2, 2017	0.13
Eggman's nemesis Nominatus is back. With the help of his two virus companions, he tries to conquer the world outside the computer.
76	24	"Eggman's Brother"	Marine & Cedric Lachenaud	Jean-Charles Andre	April 22, 2017	September 9, 2017	0.17
Steve Eggman, who claims to be the long-lost brother of Eggman, arrives in the village. However, he desires to fight for good with Sonic and his friends.
77	25	"Do Not Disturb"	Peter Saisselin	Jeremy Klein & Mathieu Fournier	April 29, 2017	September 16, 2017	0.10
An endangered species wanders into Sonic's shack, and he can't move the ugly, smelly animal because of a series of government regulations.
78	26	"Robots from the Sky"	Alan Denton, Greg Hahn and Bill Freiberger	Jordi Valbuena	May 6, 2017	September 23, 2017	0.10 0.13 0.40
79	27	"Robots from the Sky"	Alan Denton, Greg Hahn and Bill Freiberger	Jordi Valbuena	May 13, 2017	September 23, 2017	0.10 0.13 0.40
80	28	"Robots from the Sky"	Alan Denton, Greg Hahn and Bill Freiberger	Jordi Valbuena	May 20, 2017	September 23, 2017	0.10 0.13 0.40
81	29	"Robots from the Sky"	Alan Denton, Greg Hahn and Bill Freiberger	Jordi Valbuena	May 27, 2017	September 23, 2017	0.10 0.13 0.40
Part 1: Mighton and Bolt, two robots from Morristown, a city in the clouds, think Sonic and his friends are evil because they are destroying Eggman's robots. Part 2: Robots all over the planet have become evil. Sonic and Tails travel to Morristown to seek help, but not before evading through its defense system. Part 3: Sonic and Tails find out that Morristown is under the control of Tails's abandoned creation, Hypno-bot. After a brief confrontation with them, Hypno-bot hypnotizes and controls nearly all robots in Morristown. Part 4: Hypno-bot teams up with Eggman to conquer the world, so Team Sonic teams up with their cyborg duplicates to defeat Hypno-bot and his army.
82	30	"Flea-ing from Trouble"	Marie Beardmore	Jean-Charles Andre	June 3, 2017	September 30, 2017	0.08
Despite Eggman attacking with his tiniest robot yet, it poses a problem to the gang and to the village.
83	31	"Lightning Bowler Society"	Peter Saisselin	Jean-Charles Andre	June 10, 2017	October 7, 2017	0.09
The Lightning Bolt Society threatens to take away Sonic and the gang's fan base after an intense bowling match.
84	32	"Planes, Trains and Dude-Mobiles (Note: The events of "Planes, Trains and Dude-Mobiles" occur simultaneously to those of "Sticks and Amy's Excellent Staycation")"	Alan Denton & Greg Hahn	Jeremy Klein & Lola Etrivert	June 17, 2017	October 14, 2017	N/A
Sonic, Tails, and Knuckles are enthusiastic to find out that their band Dude-itude booked its first performance. In their new decorated van, they hit the road, but are eventually imprisoned after speeding. They must find a way to get back on the road again in time for their band's performance.
85	33	"Sticks and Amy's Excellent Staycation"	Alan Denton & Greg Hahn	Jeremy Klein & Lola Etrivert	June 24, 2017	October 21, 2017	N/A
With Dude-itude away for a gig, Amy and Sticks relax and enjoy their weekend. However, Belinda plans an attack after hearing that half the gang are gone for the band performance.
86	34	"Inn Sanity"	Sam Freiberger	Gael Leroux & Selena Piques	July 1, 2017	October 28, 2017	N/A
Eggman turns his lair into a luxury and tourist resort in order to raise funding to pay his trash pickup tax bill.
87	35	"Mister Eggman"	Sam Freiberger	Jeremy Klein & Lola Etrivert	July 8, 2017	November 3, 2017	N/A
When it's revealed that Eggman isn't actually a doctor, he becomes a joke and must go back to school to complete his Ph.D. in evil.
88	36	"The Haunted Lair"	Sandrine Joly	Jeremy Corbeaux	July 15, 2017	November 10, 2017	N/A
Eggman sells his lair to Barker thinking his evil lair is haunted. Sonic and Tails must prove to Eggman that ghosts aren't real.
89	37	"Return of the Buddy Buddy Temple of Doom"	Sam Freiberger	Hugues Malety-Fischer & Milena Mardos	July 22, 2017	November 17, 2017	N/A
Unable to use his robots, the Froglodytes, under the orders of Eggman, force the Gogobas to dig for a crystal that will power Eggman's giant new Mech Suit.
90	38	"Eggman's Anti Gravity Ray"	Marie Beardmore	Gael Leroux & Milena Mardos	July 29, 2017	November 24, 2017	N/A
Eggman invents an anti-gravity ray that causes trouble in Hedgehog Village. While this occurs, Cubot, with newfound confidence, tries to enlighten the villagers.
91	39	"Victory"	Sam Freiberger	Jean-Charles Andre	August 5, 2017	December 1, 2017	N/A
Sonic challenges Eggman and his robots to a soccer game in order to avoid the closure of the village's beloved recreation center.
92	40	"Three Men and My Baby!"	Evan Stanley	Jordi Valbuena	August 12, 2017	December 8, 2017	N/A
After Sonic, Tails and Knuckles accidentally injure Lady Walrus, Chumley, Lady Walrus' baby, must be taken care of by the three.
93	41	"Where Have All the Sonics Gone?"	Marine & Cedric Lachenaud	Jeremy Klein & Milena Mardos	August 19, 2017	December 15, 2017	N/A
Sonic is sent by Morpho to an alternate dimension where he doesn't exist. There, Sonic must unify his gang and help retake the village.
94	42	"If You Build It They Will Race"	Jake James	Jeremy Klein	August 26, 2017	December 22, 2017	N/A
The gang becomes very competitive with one another when they enlist in an auto race with vehicles they designed themselves.
95	43	"Chain Letter"	Peter Saisselin	Gael Leroux & Milena Mardos	September 2, 2017	December 29, 2017	N/A
Sonic allows Eggman to be his social media friend – a kindness he will surely regret.
96	44	"Vector Detector"	Reid Harrison	Jeremy Klein & Adrien Fromentiel	September 9, 2017	January 5, 2018	N/A
Amy's hammer is gone and she is lost without it. Vector the detective is on the case.
97	45	"Three Minutes or Less"	Freddie Gutierrez	Hugues Malety-Fischer & Milena Mardos	September 30, 2017	January 26, 2018	N/A
Sonic starts working at Meh Burger as a delivery boy, guaranteeing he'll make all deliveries in under 3 minutes. However, Eggman stands in Sonic's way.
98	46	"Lair on Lockdown"	Francoise Gralewski	Gael Leroux & Milena Mardos	October 7, 2017	February 2, 2018	N/A
After accidentally triggering a lockdown protocol during a battle, the gang is trapped in Eggman's lair with Eggman, Cubot and Orbot in separate places. Sonic and his friends will have to cooperate with Eggman and his accomplices in order to escape.
99	47	"You and I Bee-come One"	Benoit Grenier	Hugues Malety-Fischer & Luc-David Garraud	October 14, 2017	February 9, 2018	N/A
Tails tests his new teleportation device on himself and accidentally merges with a Bee-Bot. Sonic must find a way to reverse the process.
100	48	"Don't Make Me Angry"	Benoit Grenier	Jean-Charles Andre	October 21, 2017	February 16, 2018	N/A
After a foiled experiment, Eggman morphs into an adorable little cat-like creature every time he is angered.
101	49	"Eggman Family Vacation"	Reid Harrison	Jeremy Klein & Luc-David Garraud	October 28, 2017	February 23, 2018	N/A
Steve and Eggman turn their family vacation in Morristown into an evil opportunity. As a result, Mighton and Bolt reach out to Sonic and his friends for help.
102	50	"Return to Beyond the Valley of the Cubots"	Ken Pontac & Warren Graff	Gael Leroux & Milena Mardos	November 4, 2017	March 2, 2018	N/A
After Tails gives D-Fekt, a small robot, the ability to talk, the robot joins the Cubot rejects to try taking down their arch-nemesis, Eggman.
103	51	"Eggman: The Video Game"	Jean-Christophe Derrien	Jeremy Corbeaux & Lola Etrivert	November 11, 2017	March 9, 2018	0.17
104	52	"Eggman: The Video Game"	Natalys Raut-Sieuzac	Jeremy Corbeaux & Lola Etrivert	November 18, 2017	March 9, 2018	0.17
Part 1: When Eggman attempts to recruit Shadow to help him bring more evil to his video game, it has dangerous consequences for Sonic and his friends. Part 2: The End of the World - Dealing with Shadow's anger, Eggman switches places with his counterpart from a dimension where Sonic doesn't exist. Now Sonic must deal with both Eggmen, plus Shadow and Metal Sonic, before the two dimensions collapse.
