= Viva Ned Flanders =

- The Simpsons episode
- Episode no.: Season 10; Episode 10
- Directed by: Neil Affleck
- Written by: David M. Stern
- Production code: AABF06
- Original air date: January 10, 1999

Guest appearance
- The Moody Blues as themselves

Episode features
- Chalkboard gag: "My mom is not dating Jerry Seinfeld"
- Couch gag: The Simpsons sit on the couch as normal, but Matt Groening's live-action hand spins the picture, leaving everything a blur of color.
- Commentary: Matt Groening; Mike Scully; George Meyer; Ron Hauge; Julie Thacker; Neil Affleck

Episode chronology
← Previous "Mayored to the Mob"	Next → "Wild Barts Can't Be Broken" "Brawl in the Family"
- The Simpsons season 10

"Viva Ned Flanders" is the tenth episode of the tenth season of the American animated television series The Simpsons. It first aired on Fox in the United States on January 10, 1999. In the episode, Ned Flanders, who is revealed to be 60 years old, feels that he has not lived his life to the fullest. He asks for help from his neighbor, Homer Simpson, who takes Ned to Las Vegas to show him "the right way to live". However, while there, the two become intoxicated and accidentally marry two cocktail waitresses named Amber and Ginger.

The episode was written by David M. Stern and directed by Neil Affleck. The revelation of Ned's age was heavily debated between the Simpsons staff, and the decision to make him 60 years old could have been inspired from a joke by Simpsons writer Ron Hauge. A scene in the episode, as well as the episodes closing credits, features the song "Viva Las Vegas" by Elvis Presley, although the staff originally wanted a version of the song performed by Bruce Springsteen. The Moody Blues guest-starred as themselves in the episode, and the episode marked the first appearance of the cocktail waitresses Amber and Ginger, who were voiced by Pamela Hayden and Tress MacNeille respectively.

The episode was nominated for the Primetime Emmy Award for Outstanding Animated Program (For Programming less than One Hour) in 1999, which it ultimately lost to King of the Hill. Following the tenth season's release on DVD, the episode received mostly positive reviews from critics. Amber and Ginger have appeared in later episodes in the series, the first time being the season 13 episode "Brawl in the Family", which serves as a continuation of "Viva Ned Flanders".

== Plot ==
Mr. Burns's Casino (from the episode "$pringfield", which was moved along with the rest of the city in "Trash of the Titans" for reasons that Homer doesn't get the chance to articulate) is about to get demolished; however, confusion over whether demolitions are supposed to involve implosions or explosions results in the casino being blasted into a huge dust cloud. The family goes to the car wash to get rid of the dust, and when Homer is there, he sees Ned Flanders get a senior discount. Homer thinks Ned is lying about his age and tries to expose him at church, but Ned proves he really is 60 years old. People are impressed that Ned looks so young for his age and remark that he must take exceptional care of himself, but when Ned says that he follows the three "c"s of success — clean living, chewing thoroughly, and "a daily dose of vitamin Church!" — they start to pity him for having never, in their view, truly lived at all. Ned reluctantly agrees with this. After failing on his own initiative to live more freely, Ned asks Homer to teach him the secret to his lust for life, which Homer agrees to do in after Ned gives him power of attorney and agrees to do pretty much everything Homer tells him to do.

Homer takes a nervous Ned on a gambling trip to Las Vegas (having briefly forgotten that Mr. Burns' Casino had just been demolished). When they arrive, they see Captain Lance Murdock (from "Bart the Daredevil") doing one of his stunts, and Homer chooses to volunteer, and survives (although Murdock is again badly injured). Ned is shocked that he was captivated and more shocked that he kind of wanted to see Homer get blown to pieces during the stunt. They wander into a casino called "Nero's Palace" and begin to play roulette. Ned protests against games of chance because of Deuteronomy 7, but Homer ignores him and takes the reference as a lucky number. They lose everything but Homer is not bothered by this, to Ned's further amazement. They then go to the casino's bar, and Ned gives into temptation and gets drunk on white wine spritzers.

Homer and Ned wake up the next morning in their hotel room married to the two Nero's Palace cocktail waitresses who served them their drinks: Homer's new wife is named Amber, and Ned's new wife is Ginger. Homer and Ned, realizing they were drunk and thus not of sound judgment to have such quick weddings while also being married, try to escape from the waitresses, going on a wild rampage through the casino until they are confronted by casino security, Gunter and Ernst (also from "$pringfield"), Drederick Tatum, and the Moody Blues. Homer and Ned attempt to escape in a car, but are beaten up in the process and are exiled from Las Vegas, with Amber and Ginger quickly leaving them for "real men" Gunter and Ernst (a pairing that the two men, and their skeptical tiger, don't look enthusiastic about). Homer and Ned head back to their real wives in Springfield by hitchhiking; whilst Homer tries to work out an alibi involving alien abduction, the pair are attacked by two hungry vultures.

== Production and themes ==
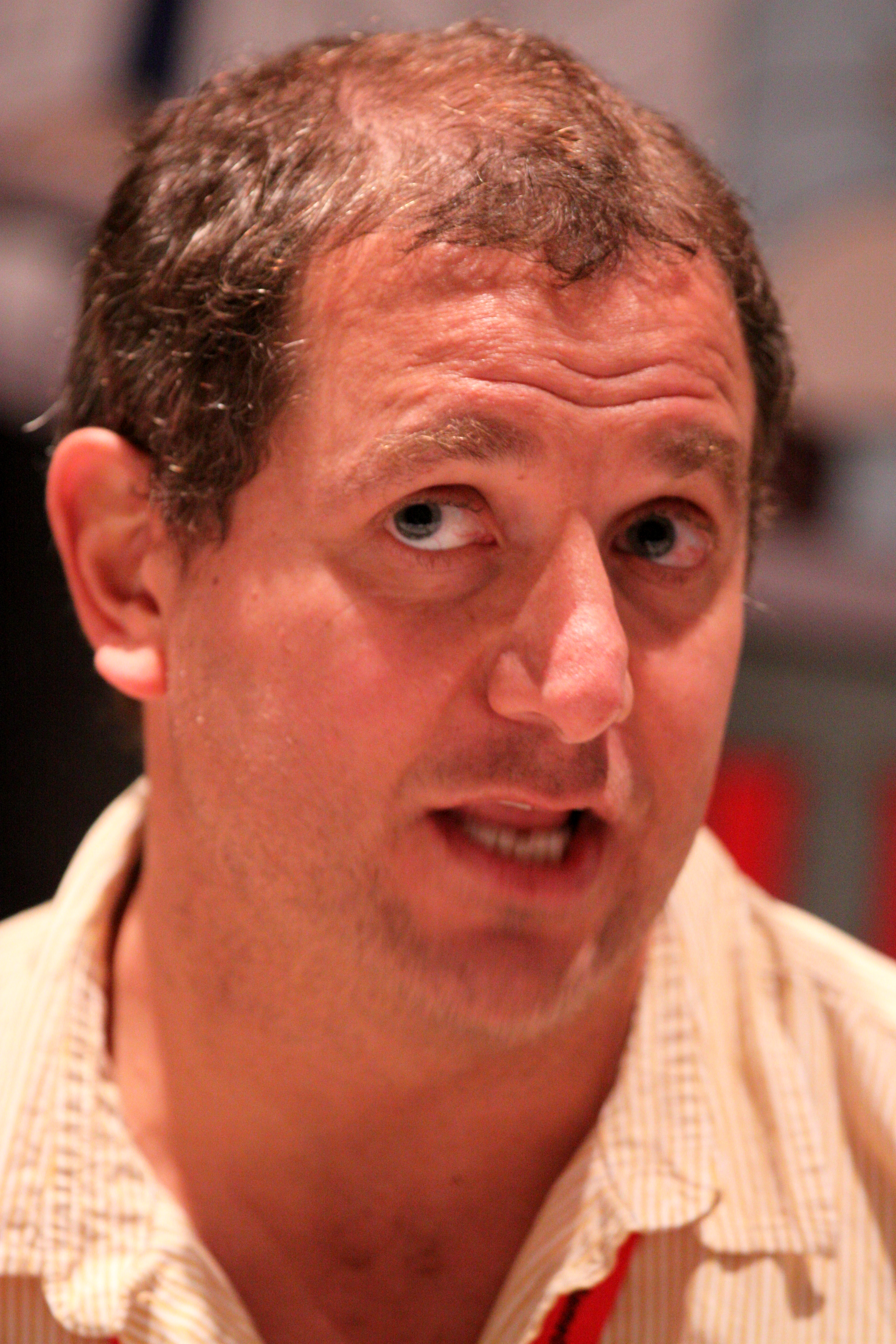
David M. Stern wrote the episode.

"Viva Ned Flanders" was written by writer David M. Stern and directed by director Neil Affleck. It was first broadcast on the Fox network in the United States on January 10, 1999. It was recorded in July 1998.

The beginning of the episode shows Mr. Burns' casino being demolished with explosion. In the DVD commentary for the episode, show runner Mike Scully stated that there was "a lot of talk" and news reports about implosions at the time. Only directly after the implosion do the on-lookers realize the amount of dust that is unleashed. This is based on an observation by the writers, who noted that, when an implosion takes place, "everybody wants to be right next to them", not realizing that dust and asbestos will "fly in the air". In the DVD audio commentary for the episode, director Affleck stated that the scene was very complicated to animate, and took about "four or five takes" to get right. Scully thought that the explosion looked "fantastic".

The revelation of Ned's age was much discussed among the writers, and Scully stated that they argued over "how old they could get away with", since Ned had "lived such a pure life" and had "taken such good care of himself". The writers kept pitching for him to be older and older, eventually debating whether his age would be 57 or 58. They then decided on 60, an idea that could have come from Ron Hauge, one of the Simpsons writers. A few weeks before the discussions, after having found out that he was slightly older than the next oldest writer in the staff, Hauge had told one of the writers, in "the most serious reasonable" voice, that he was 60 years old. At the time, Hauge was "around 40" years old.

The morning after having drunk extensively, Homer and Ned are seen sleeping, clothed, in a Jacuzzi. The staff discussed whether or not the two should wake up naked or clothed; series creator Matt Groening, for example, wanted them to wake up naked, since it would "raise some questions". During production, Affleck had drawn an alternate version of the scene, which would be based on his "extensive experience in the field of alcohol abuse" in his younger years. The scene would be in Ned's point of view, and would show Homer's open mouth half submerged in the Jacuzzi. Affleck described the alternate scene as being "a little bit Fellini-esque" and therefore did not fit with The Simpsons style. Scully had also suggested that Ned would throw up on screen at the end of the scene, however the idea never came to fruition.

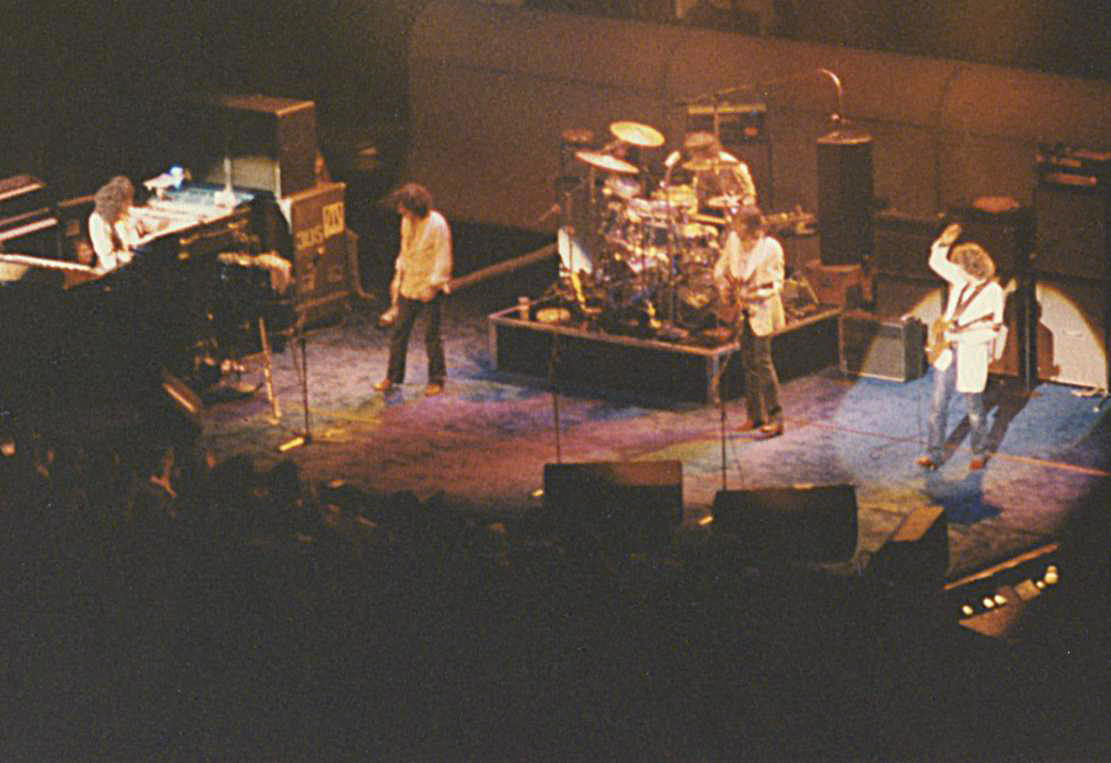
The Moody Blues guest-starred as themselves in the episode.

The song used during the chase scene in the casino, and also during the closing credits, is "Viva Las Vegas", performed by Elvis Presley. Although he admitted that he has "nothing against Elvis", Scully originally wanted to use a "hard to find" version of the song performed by Bruce Springsteen. However, Scully could not clear the version in time, and therefore had to resort to using Elvis' version of the song. The episode features The Moody Blues as themselves. Scully commented that they were "very good actors" and "did a great job". The episode also features the first appearance of Amber and Ginger, who were voiced by Pamela Hayden and Tress MacNeille respectively. Real-life commentator Don Rickles and fictional character Lance Murdock were both portrayed by series regular voice actor Dan Castellaneta, who plays Homer among many others in the series.

Affleck described the plot of the episode to have a "grotesque" and "burlesque", yet "plausible" quality to it. In a scene in the episode, Homer, not knowing of Ned's age, accuses Ned of defrauding a carwash salesman. Affleck commented that the scene has "a touch of Music hall" in it, as it turns, from a scene in church, to a "courtroom scene". He also noted that Ned's journey to Las Vegas can be compared to a Christian's travel to the temple of Mammon, a figure that in the Bible is characterized as the personification of wealth and greed.

The episode's title is a reference to the film Viva Las Vegas (1964). The panic and smoke cloud generated from the implosion of Mr. Burns' casino is reminiscent of the 1997 disaster film Dante's Peak, and the Simpson family's escape from the smoke cloud is a reference to a scene in the 1996 science fiction film Independence Day. Outside Rev. Lovejoy's church is a notice that today's sermon will be 'He Knows What You Did Last Summer', which is a reference to the title of the 1997 slasher film I Know What You Did Last Summer. As Homer and Ned escape from Vegas, a snippet of the theme from the 1996 comic science fiction film Mars Attacks! can be heard. The Comic Book Guy's license plate is NCC-1701, which is also the registration of the USS Enterprise from the Star Trek media franchise. He also has a bumper sticker which reads "my other car is the Millennium Falcon" which was given to him by somebody who looked like the actor Harrison Ford; the Millennium Falcon was the ship used by Ford's character Han Solo in the Star Wars film series. The line Homer gives after Ned signs the contract is a reference to the 1997 film The Game.

The song Homer and Ned listen to on the way to Las Vegas is "Highway Star" by English rock band Deep Purple. The two characters driving the other way from Las Vegas were based on Ralph Steadman's illustrations of Raoul Duke and his attorney Dr. Gonzo from the novel Fear and Loathing in Las Vegas, written by Hunter S. Thompson. The reference was contributed by Simpsons writer George Meyer, who stated that, since Homer and Ned were driving to Las Vegas, "we [the Simpsons writers] had to do a Ralph Steadman tribute. In the wedding video, Homer is seen wearing an attire similar to the ones worn by the Rat Pack members.

== Reception and legacy ==
In its original American broadcast on January 10, 1999, "Viva Ned Flanders" received an 11.6 rating, according to Nielsen Media Research, translating to approximately 11.5 million viewers. The same year, the episode was nominated for an Emmy award in the category of animated programming less than one hour, but it ultimately lost to the King of the Hill episode "And They Call It Bobby Love". On August 7, 2007, the episode was released as part of The Simpsons: The Complete Tenth Season DVD set.

Following its home video release, "Viva Ned Flanders" received mostly positive reviews from critics. Ian Jane of DVD Talk wrote that the episode is a "classic", and Jake McNeill of Digital Entertainment News found it to be one of the better episodes of the season. Colin Jacobson of DVD Movie Guide wrote that even though he found Ned being 60 years old "absurd", the episode "musters plenty of fine laughs". He especially liked Homer's escapades, as well as the scenes in Vegas. He concluded his review by writing that "now it’s Marge’s time to shine!" is one of his favorite lines of the series.

Gary Russell and Gareth Roberts, the authors of the book I Can't Believe It's a Bigger and Better Updated Unofficial Simpsons Guide, were also positive, commenting that the episode is "one of the fastest paced episodes ever", and "moves at breathless speed". They added that it is "enormous fun with more bizarre moments than you can shake a stick at", particularly praising a scene involving "a hysterical Joan Rivers". Mac MacEntire of DVD Verdict wrote that the establishing shots in Vegas were the episode's highlights. Aaron Roxby of Collider thought negatively of the episode however, writing that, even though the episode has "some decent gags", it is overall "one of the weaker Flanders based episodes".

Similarities have been noted on multiple occasions between this episode and the 2009 film The Hangover, particularly in the inclusion of plot devices such as intoxicated, unexpected marriage and the protagonists meeting an iconic boxer, as well as featuring a massive suite at Caesar's Palace (or "Nero's Palace" in The Simpsons). Amber and Ginger would re-appear in later episodes of the series. They first returned in the season 13 episode "Brawl in the Family", in which they track down Homer and Ned. In the DVD commentary for said episode, current show runner Al Jean praised "Viva Ned Flanders", but stated that he thought the ending was "loose". He said, "Usually, like, if you leave a wife like, in Vegas, they track you down". "Brawl in the Family" was produced to "resolve" the ending to "Viva Ned Flanders". In the season 18 episode "Jazzy and the Pussycats", the Simpson family attend Amber's funeral, after it is revealed that she has died of a drug overdose while waiting in line to ride a rollercoaster.
