= She of Little Faith =

- The Simpsons episode
- Episode no.: Season 13; Episode 6
- Directed by: Steven Dean Moore
- Written by: Bill Freiberger
- Production code: DABF02
- Original air date: December 16, 2001

Guest appearance
- Richard Gere as himself

Episode features
- Couch gag: The couch is a slot machine that shows Homer, Marge, Bart, and Lisa in the windows. Maggie, however, is replaced by lucky number “7” as a jackpot siren wails and a pile of gold coins spill out.
- Commentary: Al Jean; Matt Selman; John Frink; Tom Gammill; Max Pross; Bill Freiberger; Pamela Hayden; Steven Dean Moore

Episode chronology
← Previous "The Blunder Years"	Next → "Brawl in the Family"
- The Simpsons season 13

"She of Little Faith" is the sixth episode of the thirteenth season of the American animated television series The Simpsons. It first aired in the United States on the Fox network on December 16, 2001. In this episode, Bart Simpson and his father Homer accidentally launch a model rocket into the Springfield church, causing the church council to accept funding plans from Mr. Burns for reparation. Discontent with how commercialized the rebuilt church has become, Lisa abandons Christianity and sets out to follow a new religion, deciding on Buddhism.

The episode was directed by Steven Dean Moore and written by Bill Freiberger, whom executive producer and show runner Al Jean had met while working on the television series Teen Angel. The plot idea for the episode was pitched by Jean, who wanted to expand on Lisa's personality, even though some of the Simpsons writers were concerned over the episode's originality. Lisa has remained a Buddhist since this episode, in a similar fashion to how she remained a vegetarian since Lisa the Vegetarian, towards which, this episode serves as a companion piece. The episode features actor Richard Gere, who agreed to star as long as Buddhism was portrayed accurately, that Lisa remain a Buddhist for the rest of the series, and as long as Lisa would say "Free Tibet".

The episode was nominated for the Primetime Emmy Award for Outstanding Animated Program (For Programming less than One Hour) in 2002, which it ultimately lost to the Futurama episode, "Roswell That Ends Well".

Following the thirteenth season's release on DVD and Blu-ray, the episode received mostly positive reviews from critics.

== Plot ==
While watching a 1950s science fiction movie, Bart and Lisa see a commercial for a model rocket kit and Bart orders it by using Homer's credit card number. Homer helps Bart and Milhouse build it, but it blows up before launching. Jealous that Ned Flanders built a superior rocket, Homer enlists the help of his former nerdy college roommates, Gary, Doug, and Benjamin, to build a rocket piloted by the hamster Nibbles. The rocket lifts off successfully, but it develops complications and Nibbles bails out. Homer attempts to shoot down the rocket with a 12 gauge shotgun, but the rocket crashes into the church.

The church council meets up to decide how to come up with money to fund the repairs to the church. With no other aid available, they accept help from Mr. Burns and Lindsay Naegle, who wish to run the church as a business. The two rebuild the church as a commercial monstrosity, complete with advertising signs, a currency exchanger, a Lard Lad statue, a photo booth for the churchgoers to put their faces in a cut-out of Jesus from The Last Supper, and a Jumbotron known as "Godcam". Lisa is appalled at this and after Lovejoy welcomes The Noid to hold a sermon "on the sanctity of deliciousness," she abandons the church, feeling her religion has lost its soul.

That night, Lisa prays to God and assures him she has not turned her back on Him, but plans to seek a new path to "Him" (or "Her", she says). While on a walk around town, passing many sacrilegious signs, she finds Springfield's Buddhist temple. Inside she sees Lenny and Carl meditating, and Hollywood actor Richard Gere teaches the core concepts of Buddhism to her. An intrigued Lisa takes a pamphlet on Buddhism and studies it at home. It convinces her of the virtues of the faith, and Lisa announces out of her window that she has become a Buddhist. Lisa plants her own bodhi tree in the back yard and begins to meditate, but Marge grows increasingly worried about Lisa's soul and tries to convince her to come back to Christianity.

At the church council meeting, Reverend Lovejoy tells Marge to use Christmas to bribe her back. Homer places a tasteless animatronic angel on top of Lisa's bodhi tree, and Marge bakes cookies, decorates the home, and has Ralph and Milhouse dress as a pony in wrapping paper to tempt her, but Lisa runs away from her family's home when she realizes what is happening. At the Buddhist temple, she tells Gere her family tried to trick her, but Gere informs her that while Buddhism is about one finding inner peace, it is also about respecting the diversity of other religions based on love and compassion. Thus, Lisa is free to celebrate any holiday with her family, including Christmas. Lisa goes back home, falling asleep beside the Christmas tree and tells everyone that she will be celebrating Christmas with them and continue paying lip service to Christianity while practicing Buddhism for the rest of her life. As Marge takes her to the kitchen to get some cookies for her, Lisa asks about her pony, and Marge tries unsuccessfully to change the subject as Lisa calls out for her gift.

== Production and themes ==
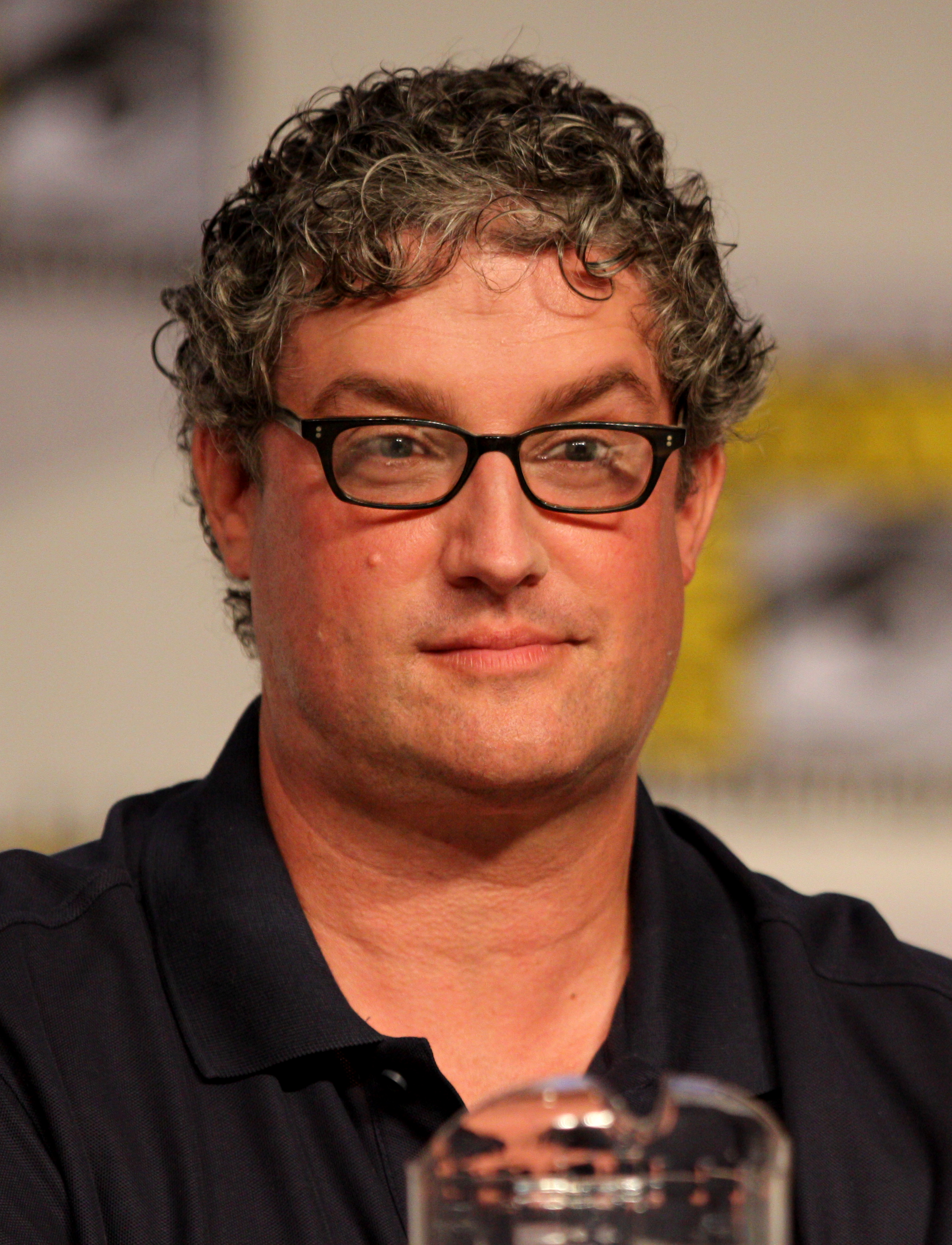
Al Jean (pictured) met the episode's writer, Bill Freiberger while they worked together on the television series Teen Angel.

"She of Little Faith" was directed by Steven Dean Moore and was the only episode Bill Freiberger wrote for The Simpsons. It was first broadcast on Fox in the United States on December 16, 2001.

Before returning to work full-time on The Simpsons, Jean had worked on a television series called Teen Angel together with Mike Reiss and Freiberger. While working on Teen Angel, Freiberger suggested that, if Jean was ever to run The Simpsons, he should hire Freiberger as a writer on the series. For the thirteenth season, Jean became show runner and assigned Freiberger to write the episode. Freiberger wrote the first draft as a freelance script at his parents' barn in Pennsylvania, and when he returned to the writing staff to rewrite the story, Freiberger took so many notes that the script became 106 pages long. As a result, Freiberger spent more time editing down the script rather than writing it. The episode's main plot, in which Lisa becomes a Buddhist, was pitched by Jean, who wanted to expand Lisa's personality. When he pitched the plot idea to the Simpsons writing staff, they became concerned about the episode's originality. They argued that the series had already explored religious themes in earlier episodes, but Jean assured them that the episode would be about Lisa first-and-foremost, rather than Buddhism. Unlike several other episodes in the series in which a character undergoes a change in their personality, Lisa has remained a Buddhist since this episode, much like her conversion to vegetarianism in "Lisa the Vegetarian".

Freiberger pitched the subplot involving the model rockets in the beginning of the episode. He based it on a real-life experience, in which he, as a child, accidentally launched a model rocket into a window in his house. A scene from this subplot was removed from the episode following the September 11 attacks. The scene would show a man named Hassan Jay Salam being arrested by policemen (who tells them to call his cousin Casey Kasem), who think the rocket Bart and Homer launched was launched by him (The rocket bears the abbreviation HJS, which stands for Homer J Simpson). After the attacks, the scene was considered too offensive by the Fox censors, so the scene was removed. Originally, the subplot would involve Marge trying to get Homer to build model rockets with Bart. Homer would not want to at first, but after Marge convinces him, he would soon get more into it than Bart. The plot idea was encouraged by some of the writers who thought that Marge had "gotten short shrift," and, according to Freiberger, Marge would have had a "really big part motivating the story" had the subplot remained intact.

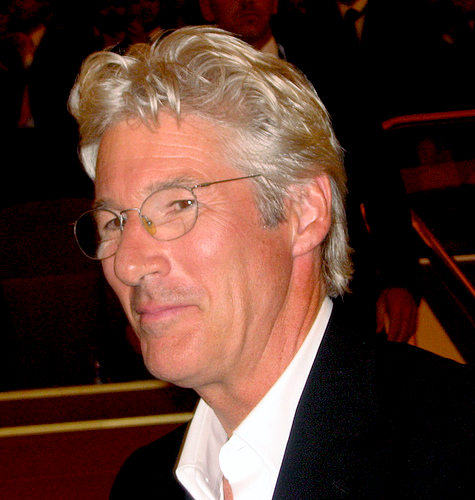
Richard Gere agreed to appear as long as Lisa said "Free Tibet" in the episode.

The renovated church in the episode is built like a mall; several stores and merchandising is located inside, and Reverend Lovejoy plugs products and television programs during his sermons. The scene is used to satirize the so-called "megachurches" and the commercialization sometimes associated with these institutions. The episode also argues that, even if Christmas has lost most of its meaning, it is more important to "keep these thoughts to oneself in order to make the family happy." It also comments on what the writers believe to be the "all or nothing, we're right, you're all going to hell mentality" of some Christian movements. Even though "She of Little Faith" is a Christmas episode, the holiday is not mentioned until the episode's third act. Jean stated in the DVD audio commentary for the episode that the writers did not want to make a conventional Christmas episode, and instead wanted to "slide into" the subject.

The episode features actor Richard Gere as himself. Gere agreed to guest star under three conditions, the first being that Buddhism should be portrayed accurately, the second, that Lisa remain a Buddhist for the rest of the series, and his third and strongest request being that Lisa should say "Free Tibet" in the episode. Jean agreed, but Gere ended up with the line. However, Lisa did yell out "Free Tibet" in an episode in the following season. Gere's lines were recorded in New York City by Jean who, in the DVD audio commentary for the episode, stated that Gere was "great" and that he "didn't mind being made fun of" in the episode. He also mentioned that Gere was one of the only guest-stars they had that "looked handsome simpsonized."

== Release ==
In 2002, "She of Little Faith" was nominated for the Primetime Emmy Award for Outstanding Animated Program (For Programming less than One Hour), but it ultimately lost to the Futurama episode "Roswell That Ends Well". Matt Groening, creator of both series, joked that the award "gave [him] a chance to be bitter either way". On August 24, 2010, the episode was released as part of The Simpsons: The Complete Thirteenth Season DVD and Blu-ray set.

Following its home video release, "She of Little Faith" received mostly positive reviews from critics.

Dominic von Reidermann of Suite101.com considered the episode to be a "comedy gem" and Casey Burchby of DVD Talk wrote that it "offers its fair share of laughs".

Stuart O' Conner of Screen Jabber was also favorable, calling it a "first-rate" episode.

Writing for Obsessed With Film, Adam Rayner derided Gere's performance as being "bland and dreary", however he went on to write that it couldn't ruin the episode, which he described as "great". He especially liked Flanders' line "My Satan sense is tingling."

Jennifer Malkowski, who gave the episode a B−, wrote that the episode's "highlight" was a scene in which "Milhouse mourns his 'beautiful eyebrows'" that were burned off by Bart and Homer's model rocket.

In 2007, Simon Crerar of The Times listed Gere's performance as one of the thirty-three funniest cameos in the history of the show.

Ron Martin of 411Mania, who consider episodes about Lisa to be "traditional channel changers", wrote that it "offers one of the worst ‘Lisa episodes’" of the series.

Colin Jacobsson of DVD Movie Guide criticized the episode for being "little more than a retread" of earlier episodes of the series. He argued that the episode borrows plot elements from both "Lisa the Vegetarian", "Lisa's Pony" and "Grift of the Magi", and went on to write that the episode is "a pretty unoriginal piece of work". He concluded his review by writing that the episode "fails to deliver more than a chuckle or two".

== Cultural references ==
The episode title is a reference to the common phrase "O ye of little faith".
