= Bill Freiberger =

American screenwriter (born 1962)

- Born: William Freiberger; 1962 (age 63–64)
- Education: John F. Kennedy High School
- Occupations: Writer; producer; voice actor
- Years active: 1989–present
- Known for: Herman's Head; The PJs; Sonic Boom; Drawn Together; The Simpsons
- Children: Sam Freiberger

William Freiberger (born 1962) is an American writer, producer and voice actor for such shows as The Simpsons, Drawn Together, The PJs, and Sonic Boom.

== TV series' episodes written by Freiberger ==
- Get a Life
  - "Roots"
  - "Paper Boy 2000"
- Charlie Hoover
  - "Anniversary"
- Bill & Ted's Excellent Adventures (live action)
  - "It's a Totally Wonderful Life"
- Herman's Head
  - "How to Succeed in Business Without Really Dying"
  - "Guns 'n' Neurosis"
  - "Twisted Sister"
  - "Sperm 'n' Herman"
  - "The Waterton-gate Break-In"
  - "The One Wherein They Go on the Love Boat"
  - "Cat's in the Cradle"
  - "Love and the Single Parent"
  - "When Hermy Met Crawford's Daughter"
  - "When Hairy Met Hermy"
  - "When Hermy Met Maureen McCormick"
  - "When Hermie Met Crawford's Girlfriend"
- Hardball
  - "My Name is Hard B"
  - "The Butt Winnick Story"
- Thunder Alley
  - "Workin' Man's Blues"
- Men Behaving Badly (a.k.a. It's a Man's World)
  - "I Am What I Am"
  - "Sarah's Vestigial Organ"
- The PJs
  - "The HJs"
  - "How the Super Stoled Christmas"
  - "Rich Man, Porn Man"
  - "Operation Gumbo Drop"
- The Simpsons
  - "She of Little Faith"
- 3-South
  - "My Name is Todd W."
- Drawn Together
  - "Terms of Endearment"
  - "Ghostesses in the Slot Machine"
  - "Xandir and Tim, Sitting in a Tree"
  - "Charlotte's Web of Lies"
- Sonic Boom
  - "Robots from the Sky: Part 1"
  - "Robots from the Sky: Part 2"
  - "Robots from the Sky: Part 3"
  - "Robots from the Sky: Part 4"

== Voices ==
- Sonic Boom - Comedy Chimp, Lady Walrus, additional voices
