= Chao Garden =

Virtual pet minigame in Sonic Adventure

A screenshot of Tails in the Chao Garden minigame.

Chao Garden (Japanese: チャオガーデン) is a virtual pet minigame introduced in the 1998 video game Sonic Adventure and its sequel, Sonic Adventure 2. It was based on the A-Life system originally developed for Sonic Team's previous game Nights into Dreams, and allows the player to raise small fairy-like creatures known as Chao, acting as a motivation for the player to keep playing the platforming areas of the Adventure games in order to gain items to use to help improve their Chao. Chao can be entered into competitions such as racing and karate, and can be transferred to the VMU so the player can care for them on the go. In the GameCube ports, the VMU connectivity is replaced with Game Boy Advance connectivity, adding a small portable Chao Garden called the Tiny Chao Garden.

The Chao Garden feature was well-received by critics and is considered a fan favorite despite not appearing in a game since Sonic Adventure 2. Fans often make requests for a new Chao Garden, but Sonic Team head Takashi Iizuka had said that it has not happened because of how closely tied the minigame is to the Adventure duology. Chao Garden has inspired both derivative works such as fan games and game mods, as well as original indie games.

== Gameplay ==
Chao hatch from an egg and evolve in different ways depending on how they are raised, and will eventually die when they reach the end of their lifespan. If a player takes good care of their Chao, the creature may be reincarnated at the end of its lifespan. Chao can be fed coconuts and various fruits from trees in the garden. Chao can get a health check-up and learn new skills at the Chao Kindergarten. The North American release of Sonic Adventure added the ability for users to trade Chao over the Internet. In the original Dreamcast games, Chao can also be placed into the VMU and taken on the go, which features a minigame entitled Chao Adventure, which helps increase their stats.

Sonic Adventure 2 adds the ability for Chao to evolve into Hero and Dark Chao depending on the alignment of the characters who care for them. These types of Chao also have special unlockable areas known as the Dark Garden and Hero Garden. In Sonic Advance, the Chao return in the form of the minigame Tiny Chao Garden, which Chao from Sonic Adventure 2: Battle can be transferred to and from through interconnection between the GameCube and Game Boy Advance. A special variation of Chao, the Tails Chao, was distributed using the Tiny Chao Garden.

Each Chao has a rated score in four different stats: swimming, flying, running and strength, which are integral to their performance in the Chao Racing minigame and Sonic Adventure 2: Battle's Chao Karate. They also have an additional stamina stat, which is increased through feeding. Chao's personalities develop differently depending on the way they are treated. Adult Chao can breed in order to produce more Chao with different genetics. When Chao are ready to breed, flowers will sprout around them. In very rare instances, Chao can get sick – a feature that went undiscovered by the fan community for two decades.

== Development ==
Chao Garden was first introduced in 1998 for Sonic Adventure and its sequel, Sonic Adventure 2. In the minigame, players can raise their own pet Chao, a small fairy-like creature with a floating orb that expresses their emotions. Based on the A-Life system originally developed for Nights into Dreams, the Chao Garden was implemented to give newer players a motivation to play the game's levels, as small animals can be rescued and used to boost the stats and change the appearance of the player's Chao, and rings gathered in the platforming sections can be used to purchase food and toys for them. In Sonic Adventure, Chao did not interact with each other, but this feature was added in the sequel in order to create a more realistic depiction of artificial life.

== Reception ==
Critical reception of the Chao Garden mechanic has been primarily positive. Ana Diaz of Polygon describes Chao Garden as "shockingly rich and complex" for a side feature. GameSpot's review of Sonic Adventure echoes this, calling it "surprisingly interesting and fun to play around with". Anthony Chau writes in his IGN review of Sonic Adventure 2 that the Chao feature was massively overhauled from its original incarnation, calling the updated version "so entertaining and so much more complex". Clark A. of Digitally Downloaded refers to the feature as "a clever way to encourage replaying stages". Cube Magazine cites Chao as a reason as to why the Adventure games sold so well, calling the breeding mechanic "addicting". Electronic Gaming Monthly called Chao Garden the "best feature" of Sonic Adventure 2: Battle, and Nintendo Life's Kate Gray called it "the best thing that the Sonic series has ever done", and referred to Sonic Adventure 2 as "a Chao game with a 3D platforming game bolted onto the side".

== Legacy ==
The Chao Garden feature is a favorite among fans of the franchise, with a return being highly requested. Shamus Kelly writes for Den of Geek that some fans view Chao Garden as the main appeal of Sonic Adventure. PC Gamer author Lincoln Carpeter describes the lack of more appearances of the feature as "a continued and baffling mystery" because of how beloved it is. Takashi Iizuka has said that Sega has no plans to create a standalone Chao game, due to how closely the feature is tied to Sonic Adventure.

Fans have created numerous mods for Sonic Adventure 2 to expand the Chao system, such as "Chao World Expanded", which adds new features to the minigame. Multiple fan games have been created based on the Chao Garden, including Pocket Chao Garden and Chao Resort Island. Indie games like Poglings, Bobo Bay, and Loddlenaut have also drawn inspiration from the Chao Garden for their own development.

In her IGN review of Pokémon Channel, Mary Jane Irwin used the term "glorified Chao program" to refer to the game's virtual pet elements. The hub area of Balan Wonderworld was often compared to the Chao Garden as well, with an article in Edge calling it "effectively a Chao Garden by another name", and Jordon Oloman of NME referring to it as "an utterly bonkers mix of Pikmin and Sonic Adventure 2’s Chao Garden".
