= Sonic Runners Adventure =

2017 video game

- Developer: Gameloft S.E.
- Publisher: Gameloft
- Producer: Dmitriy Ryzhykh
- Artist: Stanislav Burika
- Composer: Tomoya Ohtani
- Series: Sonic the Hedgehog
- Platforms: Android, Java ME, iOS
- Release: Java ME, Android: UK: June 10, 2017; WW: August 9, 2017; iOS, Android: WW: December 20, 2017
- Genres: Endless runner, platformer
- Mode: Single-player

Sonic Runners Adventure is a 2017 endless runner platform game published by Gameloft for iOS, Android and Java-based mobile phones. As part of the Sonic the Hedgehog series, the game serves as a sequel to 2015's Sonic Runners. The game was first released in select regions in June 2017 and worldwide in August 2017.

== Gameplay ==
Similar to its predecessor Sonic Runners, Sonic Runners Adventure is a platform game with endless runner elements. Players choose between nine different characters, each with unique abilities. Players must guide their chosen character through a series of levels based on locations in Sonic Generations and Sonic Lost World. Characters automatically move forward, so players must tap their screen to avoid obstacles and enemies. Scattered around levels are golden rings, which serve as a form of health: rings protect the player from enemies or obstacles, though they scatter when the player is hit and blink before disappearing. Several changes from the original game have been made as well; the game can be played offline, and there are three types of levels in the game: "Finite", "Looped", and "Infinite".

== Development ==
The game was launched in PAL regions on June 10, 2017. When the game was initially released back in August, the game was made exclusive to Gameloft's store in which players had to pay to download the app. The game was later released on the App Store and Google Play on December 20, 2017.

== Reception ==
Reception

Aggregate score
Aggregator	Score
Metacritic	78/100

Review score
Publication	Score
TouchArcade	4/5

Carter Dotson of TouchArcade expressed hope that an iOS version of the game would be released, and praised the fact that it was a game with a fixed price, rather than the original Runner's freemium approach. It holds a Metacritic score of 78 out 100, indicating "generally favorable reviews", with the gameplay, level design and presentation receiving praise.
