= Sonic Runners =

2015 video game

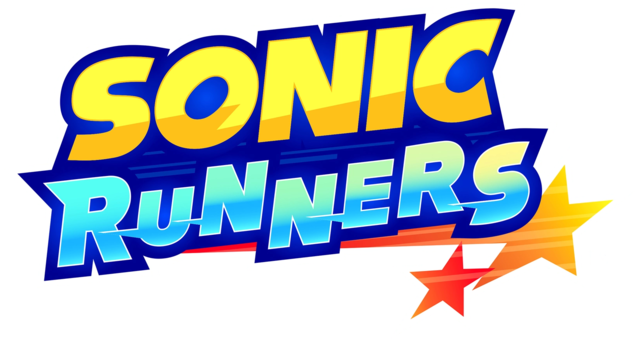
- Developer: Sonic Team
- Publisher: Sega
- Director: Takao Hirabayashi
- Producer: Takashi Iizuka
- Designers: Takayuki Okada; Takeshi Yamazaki; Jyunpei Ootsu
- Programmer: Kentarou Tomii
- Artist: Sachiko Kawamura
- Composer: Tomoya Ohtani
- Series: Sonic the Hedgehog
- Engine: Unity (uncredited)
- Platforms: Android, iOS
- Release: June 25, 2015
- Genre: Endless runner
- Mode: Single-player

Sonic Runners (Note: Japanese: ソニック・ランナーズ, Hepburn: Sonikku Rannāzu) was a 2015 endless runner game in the Sonic the Hedgehog franchise for Android and iOS. It was developed by Sonic Team as its first Sonic game exclusive to smartphones and published by Sega. In Sonic Runners, the player-character constantly ran forward, and players controlled their jumping from a side-scrolling perspective using the touchscreen. The game was free-to-play, featured a wide variety of playable characters from the Sonic series, and received periodic updates.

Development began in late 2013 and lasted a year and a half. Sonic Team sought to take advantage of the uses of smartphones and built the game using the Unity game engine. They designed Sonic Runners to have more replay value than other endless running games. The game was soft launched in select regions in February 2015 before its full release the following June. It failed commercially and received mixed reviews; although critics praised its gameplay, they criticized the pop-up ads, pay-to-play elements, and technical problems. Sega discontinued the game in July 2016. Gameloft released a replacement game, Sonic Runners Adventure, in 2017. The game was soft launched 4 months before the franchise's 24th anniversary, and was released two days after the 24th anniversary.

== Gameplay ==
Sonic, the player-character, runs forward as Doctor Eggman tries to stop him.

Sonic Runners was a free-to-play side-scrolling video game in which the player-character was constantly running forward. To avoid obstacles and defeat enemies, the character jumped when the player tapped the touchscreen. The game featured a wide variety of playable characters from the cast of the Sonic franchise with unique abilities, such as Sonic the Hedgehog, Miles "Tails" Prower, and Knuckles the Echidna. The player started as Sonic and would unlock more characters as they progressed. Sonic Runners received periodic updates, which often included new characters. For example, Classic Sonic from Sonic Generations was added on June 26, 2015 to celebrate the 24th anniversary of the original Sonic the Hedgehog.

The goal was to obtain high scores by running for as long as possible. While running, the player ran through vertical loops and jumped in cannons and on springboards and platforms. They collected power-ups like invincibility, Wisps, rings, and crystals. Wisps granted the player temporary powers, rings protected them from getting hit by enemies or obstacles, and crystals increased their score. When the player passed a checkpoint, the rings were banked and added to their overall score. The player would occasionally engage in boss fights with Doctor Eggman, who would drop objects to stop them. After Eggman was defeated, the difficulty would increase. The game ended when the player was hit without any rings or fell in a bottomless pit. By leveling up, the player could improve their performance during a run. They could also equip a companion who would assist them by increasing their statistics, such as Chao.

The story followed an episodic format and primarily served as a tutorial that provided information on how to play the game. Players progressed through the game's main story mode by collecting enough points to progress along the world map. Each section either gave a reward, such as bonus rings, or unlocked special missions, such as boss fights. The story was told through text-based cutscenes, although players could skip them. Sonic Runners featured two types of in-game currency: Red Rings and regular rings. Red Rings were used to resume play after dying and could either be earned or obtained through in-app purchases. Rings could be used to either buy single use items or power ups for a run, or increase the effectiveness of certain items. Every day players logged in, they would get to spin a roulette wheel to earn prizes like companions. Landing on spaces marked "big" or "super" would upgrade the wheel to include better prizes. Players could also buy spins.

== Development ==
Longtime Sonic series developer Sonic Team created Sonic Runners for Android and iOS. The game was Sonic Team's first Sonic game exclusive to smartphones. Development began in late 2013 with a ten-person team, which expanded as the game progressed. It was developed over the course of a year and a half using the Unity game engine. Series veteran Takashi Iizuka, who designed and directed previous Sonic games, served as producer.

Runners was conceived after the release of Sonic the Hedgehog 4: Episode II (2012). Sonic 4 had been designed with home consoles in mind, and Sonic Team wanted to take advantage of the unique experiences and uses smartphones provided. The developers were interested in adding content regularly to keep users interested. Sonic Runners was designed to be easy to pick up and to resemble the Sega Genesis Sonic games, with a focus on action and jumping. It was also designed to have replay value—with its story mode, missions, alternate paths, and power-ups—which Sonic Team felt was something most endless running games lacked. Originally, Chao was the only character who assisted the player, but Sonic Team decided to add characters like Chip from Sonic Unleashed because they wanted to surprise players. One of the biggest challenges Sonic Team faced during development was making sure the visual quality was consistent across all platforms.

Veteran Sonic sound director Tomoya Ohtani composed the Sonic Runners soundtrack, which consists of themes from past games alongside new material. Ohtani made the music using the same methods he used for scoring previous Sonic games. The instruments he used were drums, bass, guitar, and piano, and he made the music "by focusing on creating a catchy band sound." Ohtani said composing the soundtrack was fun because it reminded him of his first work in bands. A two-volume soundtrack, Sonic Runners Original Soundtrack, was released digitally via iTunes. The first volume was released on June 24, 2015 and the second volume was released on December 25, 2015.

== Release ==
Sonic Runners' existence came to light in July 2014 after publisher Sega registered the domain name sonicrunners.com. Iizuka confirmed the game was real at the Tokyo Joypolis convention on December 28, 2014 and announced that it would be launched in 2015. A teaser trailer and more details were revealed in early February 2015. Sega soft launched Sonic Runners in Canada and Japan on February 26, 2015 for testing purposes and released the final version worldwide on June 25, 2015.

== Reception ==
Reception

Aggregate score
Aggregator	Score
Metacritic	51/100

Review scores
Publication	Score
Destructoid	6/10
TouchArcade	2/5
The Jimquisition	4.5/10
SuperPhillip Central	C-

When Sonic Runners was announced, Nintendo Life uttered disapproval that it would not be released on Wii U. Destructoid opined that while "it's tough to imagine Sonic fans getting too excited about Runners", its future augured well after the critical panning of Sonic Boom: Rise of Lyric and Sonic Boom: Shattered Crystal. Reviewing the soft launched version, Hardcore Gamer believed it was the best Sonic game in years. Although critical of the game's excessive amount of pop-up ads, they felt it was focused, exhilarating, and corrected many problems present in prior games, and described it as "everything Sonic should be". TouchArcade praised its gameplay and presentation, but criticized its online functions and wrote they "could easily see it going off the rails".

The final version received "mixed or average reviews", according to the review aggregator Metacritic. Generally, reviewers believed the core gameplay was enjoyable. TouchArcade considered it better than Sonic Dash and praised its fan service and content. Destructoid and James Stephanie Sterling felt the game was well-designed; Destructoid said it had depth and succeeded as both a platformer and a Sonic game, and Sterling wrote that in terms of gameplay it was better than most endless runners. However, the game's amount of ads and pay to play elements were extensively criticized. Sterling believed they were intrusive and made the game over-complex, and Destructoid said they were "unreasonable" and "exhausting". TouchArcade wrote that "any free-to-play monetization gimmick you can think of it, Sonic Runners has it." Technical problems, such as crashes and lengthy load times, were also criticized.

Although it was downloaded over five million times, Sonic Runners was a commercial failure. A presentation highlighting Sega's strongest performing games designated Sonic Runners a "stalling title" because it only made between ¥30—50 million a month. Nintendo Life wrote its failure was proof that the recognizability of a brand does not guarantee success. They also wrote the failure could be a cautionary tale for companies like Nintendo to not mask a game's problems by using a recognizable brand.

== Discontinuation and legacy ==
In May 2016, Sega announced it would discontinue Sonic Runners. The sale of Red Rings ended on May 27, 2016, and the servers were shut down on July 27, 2016. Because it required a constant online connection, the game is unplayable. Through reverse engineering a group of fans were able to make both a custom client and server of the game, making it playable again. In April 2017, Gameloft released a FAQ webpage that indicated a sequel to Sonic Runners was in development. Gameloft released the sequel, Sonic Runners Adventure, for Android in Russia and the United Kingdom in June 2017, and worldwide for Android and iOS in December 2017. Unlike the original, Sonic Runners Adventure is sold at a fixed price.

== See also ==
- Super Mario Run
