= Sonic the Hedgehog 4: Episode II =

2012 video game

- Digital cover art
- Developers: Dimps; Sonic Team
- Publisher: Sega
- Director: Makoto Suzuki
- Producers: Takashi Iizuka; Hiroyuki Kawano
- Designer: Kenji Ayukawa
- Programmer: Kōji Okugawa
- Artists: Hideaki Moriya; Yuji Uekawa; Satoshi Takemura
- Composer: Jun Senoue
- Series: Sonic the Hedgehog
- Platforms: Microsoft Windows, PlayStation 3, Xbox 360, Android, iOS, Ouya, Shield Portable, Shield Android TV
- Release: May 15, 2012: Microsoft Windows; WW: May 15, 2012 PlayStation 3; NA: May 15, 2012; WW: May 16, 2012 Xbox 360; WW: May 16, 2012 Android; WW: May 16, 2012 iOS; WW: May 17, 2012 Ouya; WW: July 3, 2013 Nvidia Shield; WW: July 31, 2013
- Genre: Platformer
- Modes: Single-player, multiplayer

Sonic the Hedgehog 4: Episode II (Note: Japanese: ソニック・ザ・ヘッジホッグ4(フォー) エピソードII(ツー), Hepburn: Sonikku za Hejjihoggu Fō: Episōdo Tsū) is a platform game developed by Dimps and Sonic Team, and published by Sega for the PlayStation 3, Xbox 360, iOS, Android, and Windows in 2012. It was ported to the Ouya and Nvidia Shield in 2013.

Set after Sonic the Hedgehog 4: Episode I (2010) and serves as a bridge to Sonic Adventure (1998), it follows Sonic and Tails as they attempt to once again stop Doctor Eggman and a revived Metal Sonic from using Little Planet to power the Death Egg mk.II space station. Like its predecessor, Episode II is a 2D side-scrolling video game with players guiding Sonic and Tails through levels, collecting rings and rolling into enemies. Collecting Chaos Emeralds also requires players to access special stages by ending a stage with enough rings.

Development began shortly after the release of Episode I in late 2010 and lasted around a year and a half. The developers altered the gameplay after negative feedback for Episode I. In addition to the return of Tails, Episode Metal was created for players who had purchased both games, allowing players to play as Metal Sonic through shortened versions of stages from the first game. Additional ports to the Windows Phone and Wii as part of the WiiWare service were cancelled due to space constraints. In preparation for the release of Episode II, Sonic CD (1993) was re-released to act as a "prequel".

Sonic the Hedgehog 4: Episode II received generally average reviews; many critics cited it as an improvement, with praise for its better physics engine, visuals, and multiplayer functionality, but criticism for its music, boss fights, and level design. While a moderate commercial success, Episode II sold fewer copies than Episode I, and Episode III was cancelled shortly after. In spite of the relatively poor performance, it influenced the development of Sonic Runners (2015). Another major 2D Sonic game was not released until Sonic Mania in 2017.

== Gameplay ==
In-game screenshot, showing both Sonic and Tails in White Park Zone

Sonic the Hedgehog 4: Episode II is a 2D side-scrolling platformer reminiscent of the original Sonic games for the Sega Genesis, and plays similarly to its predecessor, however levels are rendered in full 3D. Sonic and Tails are the playable characters across the game, although Tails can only be controlled in multiplayer, as he otherwise follows Sonic's movements. Both characters are able to move left or right to gain speed, jump, and roll into a ball to either gain speed down slopes or attack enemies. Pressing jump in mid-air allows Sonic to use the "homing attack" from the 3D games, which moves Sonic to the highlighted object (usually enemies or objects). New to Episode II are tag-team actions, such as Tails being able to fly up Sonic to areas Sonic cannot reach, or both rolling into a singular ball to perform a fast spin attack.

Episode II takes place across four levels ("zones"), each divided into three acts and a special fourth act dedicated to the boss. Each level contains several set pieces including slopes, loops, springs, boost pads, and bottomless pits. Like many Sonic games, rings act as a form of health and protect them from a hit, but are scattered before disappearing; if a player is hit without any, gets crushed, or falls into a pit, they will lose a life, and losing all lives will result in a game over. Most of the stages take inspiration from locations Sonic 2 or Sonic & Knuckles (1994).

Finishing an act with at least 50 rings will give the player an option to access a Special Stage, in a similar vein to Sonic the Hedgehog (1991). Special Stages in Episode II are based on the half-pipe format introduced in Sonic the Hedgehog 2 (1992), in which the game switches to a front-facing perspective as they move left and right on the board, collecting rings and avoiding hazards. Getting enough rings will reward the player with a Chaos Emerald. The game features Red Star Rings, reappearing from Sonic Colors and Sonic Generations, with one Red Ring hidden per act, although they only unlock an achievement and have no effect on gameplay.

Owners of both Episode I and II on the same system can unlock free "Episode Metal" content in Episode II. "Episode Metal" explains how Metal Sonic was revived after being defeated in Sonic CD. Players can control Metal Sonic through four acts, all of which are reworked from the first act of each zone in Episode I.

== Plot ==
Metal Sonic survived his previous defeat in Sonic CD (1993), but was severely damaged, and left on Little Planet when it disappeared at the end of the game. After the events of Episode I, Little Planet returns, and Dr. Eggman locates and repairs Metal Sonic. Sonic hears that Eggman is back and reunites with Tails to stop him. Meanwhile, Metal Sonic, after receiving a mysterious power source, searches for the heroes and sees them fly away in the Tornado, following them using Tails' rocket.

It is revealed that Eggman plans to construct a new Death Egg mk.II over Little Planet. As the dwarf planet heads back into space, Sonic and Tails follow the villains to the Death Egg. Inside, they confront and defeat Metal Sonic. Later, they defeat Eggman at the heart of the base. Sonic and Tails then escape via space pods just before the Death Egg begins to explode. As the credits roll, the duo head back to Earth while the Death Egg shuts down.

== Development ==
Sonic the Hedgehog 4: Episode II began development in late-2010, shortly after the release of Episode I and alongside Sonic Generations (2011); like its predecessor, Episode II was primarily handled by Dimps, with Sonic Team assisting the company throughout the development. Among the changes included a rewritten physics engine styled after the Genesis games after the first episode received criticism for its physics implementation.

In February 2011, Episode II was confirmed to be in early development with brand manager Ken Balough stating, "the idea is to introduce new zones with things you haven't seen." He also hinted that Episode II may have a larger budget than Episode I, due to the commercial success of Episode I. Balough stated that many ideas in Episode II were planned while the first episode was under development. Sega of America community manager Aaron Webber also hinted at Tails' appearance in Episode II with a reference to Isaiah Berlin's essay The Hedgehog and the Fox.

On August 23, 2011, Sonic Team head Takashi Iizuka stated: "this year, 2011, is the anniversary, so we're focusing on the celebration title, but moving forward to 2012, Sonic will still be going, so I'd hope to provide Episode 2 then." He also said that Sonic Team "knew about the anniversary year," and that "Generations was planned way in advance. it was always our plan to release Episode 2 after Generations." Preparing for Episode II's release, Sega re-released Sonic CD to digital platforms in late-2011, billing it as a 'prequel' to Sonic 4 as Episode II's story would rely heavily on what occurred in CD.

== Release and marketing ==
Sonic the Hedgehog 4: Episode II was officially revealed on December 29, 2011, after previously being hinted at with a poem referring to the HMS Warrior (which made its maiden voyage on December 29, 1860). While it was developed for most of the same platforms as the first episode, Episode II was confirmed to not be getting a release for the Wii on WiiWare by Balough, only stating "Episode II unfortunately will not be coming to the Wii - for reasons most have probably guessed." Digital Spy theorized it was not developed due to size constraints, which was later confirmed by Iizuka, stating that the full 3D graphics, unlike Episode I's prerendered style, meant it couldn't fit within the size limitation. (Note: WiiWare games have a maximum size limit of 40 megabytes.) A Windows Phone port was also in development which was to include save compatibility with the Xbox 360 version through cloud saving, but also ended up cancelled for unknown reasons. Sonic Super Special Magazine #3 (published by Archie Comics) also included a short promo comic for Episode II set shortly before the events of the game.

Sonic the Hedgehog 4: Episode II released in all regions from May 15-17, 2012. Shortly before the official release, on April 21, 2012, Episode II was accidentally made playable for people who had pre-ordered the game on Steam before being quickly removed. Due to the circumstances around the leak, Sega confirmed it would not seek to suspend accounts who had played the game early. Just over a year after its release, both Episode I and II were released for the Ouya and Nvidia Shield on July 9 and July 31, 2013, respectively. Later on in 2016, both games were also added to the Xbox One's catalog of backward-compatible games. The iOS version was delisted in 2014 due to compatibility issues with iOS 7, before being relisted a year later with the issues fixed. In 2018, Episode II was added to the Sega Forever service on mobile, making it free to play with ads.

== Reception ==
Reception

Aggregate score
Aggregator	Score
Metacritic	(iOS) 66/100 (PS3) 63/100 (X360) 61/100 (PC) 54/100

Review scores
Publication	Score
1Up.com	B+
Electronic Gaming Monthly	6.5/10
GameRevolution	2/5
GameSpot	6/10
GamesRadar+	2.5/5
GameTrailers	5.5/10
IGN	6.5/10
Joystiq	3/5
Official Xbox Magazine (UK)	8/10
Digital Spy	2/5
TouchArcade	(iOS) 4/5

Sonic the Hedgehog 4: Episode II received mixed reviews. Review aggregator website Metacritic gave the PlayStation 3 version 63/100, the Xbox 360 version 61/100, the PC version 54/100, and the iOS version 66/100. While a moderate commercial success, becoming the fifth best-selling game on the PlayStation Store, it was noted by Ryan Langley of Gamasutra (now Game Developer) that the leaderboards weren't showing much activity, suggesting it hadn't sold as well as the first game.

The game's improved physics and visuals were the most praised aspects of the game. Many reviewers considered it an improvement over its predecessor. The co-op mechanics were also praised. However, complaints were raised on its repetitive boss fights and level design. IGN's Lucas M. Thomas gave the game a score of 6.5, stating that while it fixes the physics problems of Episode I, it is still missing the "magic" of its Genesis predecessors. GamesRadar+'s Lucas Sullivan criticized it in similar ways, stating that the two-player mode "seems to prioritize griefing your friends instead making real in-game progress," and further stating that "every time we felt like we were reliving our old Sonic glory days, the next stage would incorporate limp and uninspired gimmicks like shifting winds or avalanche snowboarding."

Electronic Gaming Monthly's Ray Carsillo gave the game a 6.5, praising the "old-school Sonic" aspects of the gameplay, but criticizing the Tails-related gameplay, stating "there were too many puzzles that required Tails' assistance." Joystiq's Richard Mitchell had mixed feelings on the game as well, awarding it 3 out of 5 stars, and stating "Episode 2 makes improvements over its predecessor, with better visuals, useful co-op maneuvers and great special stages, but the inconsistent boss battles and uninspired level design keep it from recapturing Sonic's glory days." GameTrailers gave the game a score of 5.5, saying that the level design and the team-up moves often slow the pace of the game. Official Xbox Magazine's (UK) Jon Blyth was more positive, concluding that the game was "a smooth, slippery Sonic that takes another step away from it's [sic] single-button origins without losing any of the hog essence. With local and online co-op, it offers just enough entertainment to justify its steep episodic price."

== Legacy ==
In March 2012, Iizuka announced that Sega did not plan to continue Sonic 4 beyond Episode II. In 2015, Australian developer Christian Whitehead said that he had been offered the opportunity to develop Episode III with Sega Studios Australia before that division was shut down, and he instead worked on remasters of Sonic the Hedgehog and Sonic the Hedgehog 2 between 2012 and 2013. He said that while it was possible that Episode III could eventually be made, it was unlikely. Whitehead would go on to lead the development of Sonic Mania (2017), which, like Sonic 4, acts as a sequel to the Genesis Sonic games. Sonic 4 and Sonic Mania were frequently compared, with journalists viewing Sonic 4 unfavorably in contrast to Mania.

In 2015, Sega released Sonic Runners for mobile devices; it is an endless runner game and was the first Sonic Team game developed specifically for smartphones. In an interview with TouchArcade, Takashi Iizuka admitted that the development of Runners was influenced by Sonic Team's work on the mobile ports of Episodes I and II, wishing to make a new game with the hardware in mind. Like Sonic 4, Sonic Runners received mixed reviews and was considered a commercial failure, with heavy criticism towards its monetization but praise towards its gameplay. It was discontinued in 2016.

In April 2025, an unused Episode II ending cutscene surfaced online; it depicts the Master Emerald rebooting the Death Egg after Sonic and Tails disable it during Episode II's conclusion and features a cameo from Knuckles. ComicBook.com wrote that the cutscene suggests Episode III would have featured Eggman tricking Knuckles into helping him.
