= Sonic the Hedgehog =

Video game and media franchise

- Created by: Naoto Ohshima; Yuji Naka; Hirokazu Yasuhara
- Original work: Sonic the Hedgehog (1991)
- Owner: Sega
- Years: 1991–present

Print publications
- Books: Printed media list
- Comics: Comic book list

Films and television
- Film: Films list
- Television series: Television series list
- Web series: Web series list

Games
- Video games: List of games

Miscellaneous
- Toy: Lego Sonic the Hedgehog

Official website
- www.sonicthehedgehog.com; sonic.sega.jp/SonicChannel/

Sonic the Hedgehog (Note: Japanese: ソニック・ザ・ヘッジホッグ, Hepburn: Sonikku za Hejjihoggu) is a video game series and media franchise created by the Japanese developers Yuji Naka, Naoto Ohshima, and Hirokazu Yasuhara for Sega. The franchise follows Sonic, an anthropomorphic blue hedgehog with supersonic speed, who battles the mad scientist Doctor Eggman and his robot army. The main Sonic the Hedgehog games are platformers mostly developed by Sonic Team; other games, developed by various studios, include spin-offs in the racing, fighting, party, and sports genres. The franchise also incorporates printed media, animations, films, and merchandise.

Naka, Ohshima, and Yasuhara developed the first Sonic game, released in 1991 for the Sega Genesis, to provide Sega with a mascot to compete with Nintendo's Mario. Its success helped Sega become one of the leading video game companies during the fourth generation of video game consoles in the early 1990s. Sega Technical Institute developed the next three main Sonic game. After a hiatus during the unsuccessful Saturn era, the first major 3D Sonic game, Sonic Adventure, was released in 1998 for the Dreamcast. Sega exited the console market and shifted to third-party development in 2001, continuing the series on Nintendo, Xbox, and PlayStation systems. Takashi Iizuka has been the series' producer since 2010.

Sonic's recurring elements include a ring-based health system, level locales such as Green Hill Zone, and fast-paced gameplay. The games typically feature Sonic setting out to stop Eggman's schemes for world domination, and the player navigates levels that include springs, slopes, bottomless pits, and vertical loops. Later games added a large cast of characters; some, such as Tails, Knuckles the Echidna, and Shadow the Hedgehog, have starred in spin-offs. The franchise has crossed over with other series' including rival platformer Mario, in Mario & Sonic.

Sonic the Hedgehog is Sega's flagship franchise, one of the bestselling video game franchises, and one of the highest-grossing media franchises. Series sales and free-to-play mobile game downloads totaled 1.77 billion as of 2024. The Genesis Sonic games have been described as representative of the culture of the 1990s and listed among the greatest of all time. Although later games, such as the 2006 game, received poorer reviews, Sonic is influential in the video game industry and is frequently referenced in popular culture. The franchise is known for its fandom that produces unofficial media, such as fan art and fan games.

== History ==
=== 1990–1991: Conception and first game ===
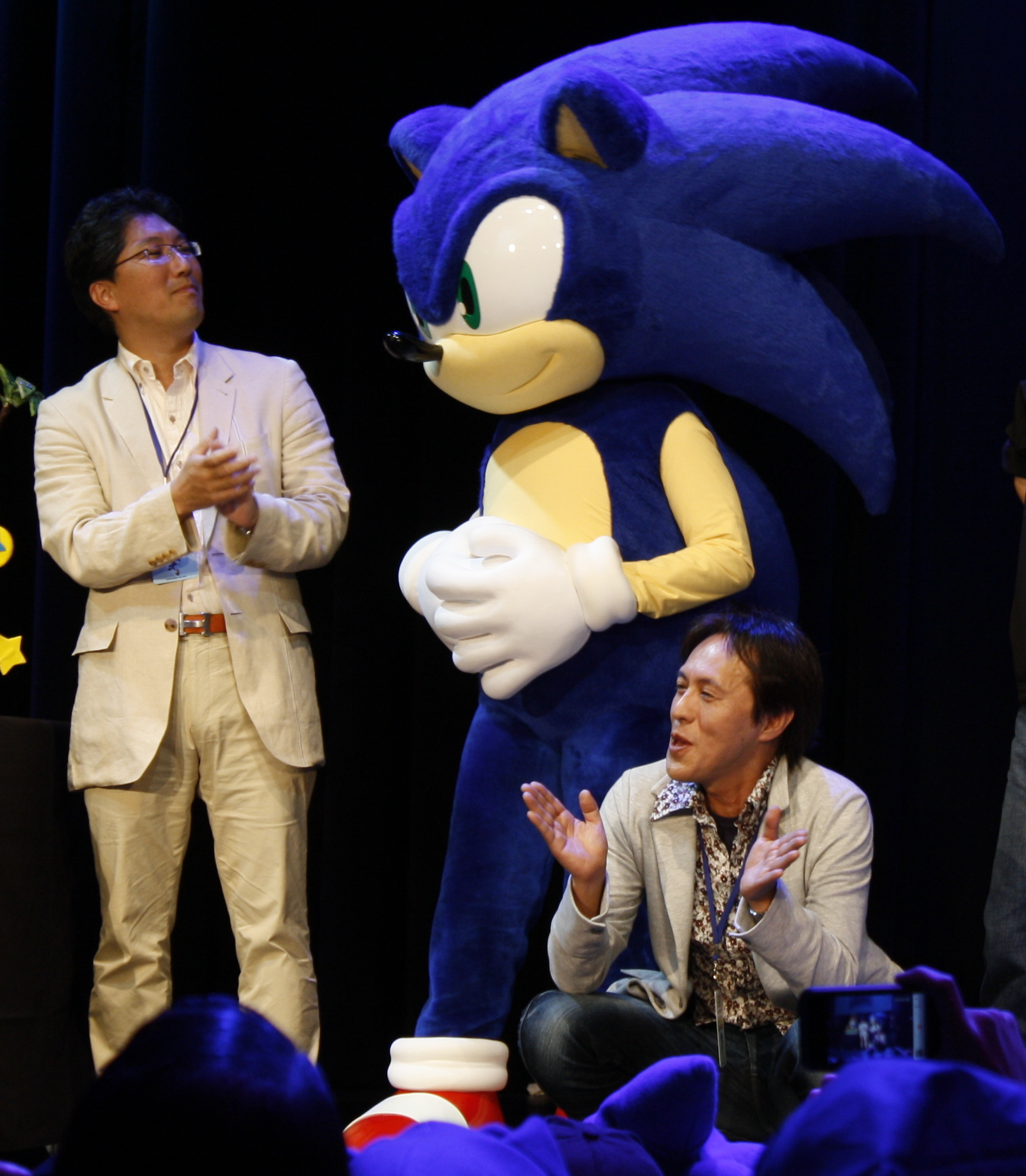
Sonic the Hedgehog co-creators: programmer Yuji Naka (left) and artist Naoto Ohshima

By 1990, the Japanese video game company Sega wanted a foothold in the video game console market with its 16-bit console, the Sega Genesis. Sega's efforts had been stymied by the dominance of Nintendo; the Genesis did not have a large install base and Nintendo did not take Sega seriously as a competitor. Sega of America CEO Michael Katz attempted to challenge Nintendo with the "Genesis does what Nintendon't" marketing campaign and by collaborating with athletes and celebrities to create games. These efforts did not break Nintendo's dominance, and Katz was replaced by Tom Kalinske, formerly of Mattel.

Sega president Hayao Nakayama decided Sega needed a flagship series and mascot to compete with Nintendo's Mario franchise. Nintendo had recently released Super Mario Bros. 3, at the time the bestselling video game ever. Sega's strategy had been based on porting its successful arcade games to the Genesis; however, Nakayama recognized that Sega needed a star character in a game that could demonstrate the power of the Genesis's hardware. An internal contest was held to determine a flagship game, with a focus on the American audience. Among the teams working on proposals were artist Naoto Ohshima and programmer Yuji Naka. The gameplay of Sonic the Hedgehog (1991) originated with a tech demo created by Naka, who had developed an algorithm that allowed a sprite to move smoothly on a curve by determining its position with a dot matrix. Naka's prototype was a platform game that involved a fast-moving character rolling in a ball through a long winding tube. Sega management accepted the project, and the designer Hirokazu Yasuhara joined the team.

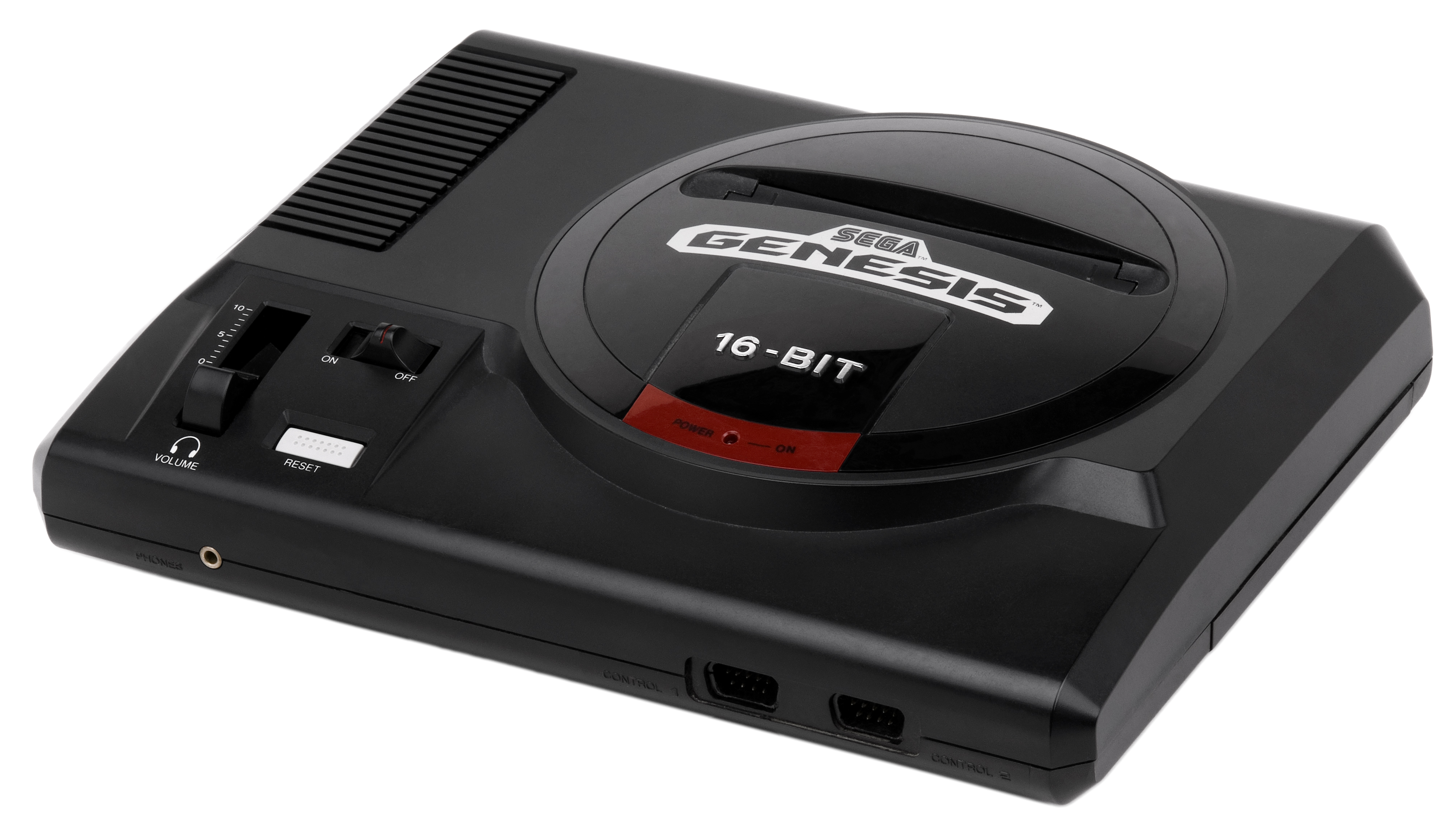
The original Sonic the Hedgehog was released on June 23, 1991, for the Sega Genesis, boosting Genesis sales dramatically.

The focus shifted to the protagonist, who Sega hoped could become its mascot. The protagonist was initially a rabbit able to grasp objects with prehensile ears, but this proved too complex for the hardware. The team moved on to animals that could roll into a ball, and eventually settled on Sonic, a teal hedgehog created by Ohshima. Naka's prototype was expanded with Ohshima's character design and levels conceived by Yasuhara. Sonic's color was chosen to match Sega's cobalt blue logo, and his red and white shoes were inspired by the cover of Michael Jackson's 1987 album Bad. His personality was based on then-Governor of Arkansas Bill Clinton's "can-do" attitude. The antagonist, Doctor Eggman, was another character Ohshima had designed for the contest. The team thought the abandoned design was excellent and redesigned it as a villain. The team took the name Sonic Team for the game's release.

Sonic's first appearance came in Sega AM3's racing game Rad Mobile (1991) five months before the release of Sonic the Hedgehog, as an ornament hanging from the driver's rearview mirror. The Sonic developers let AM3 use Sonic because they were interested in making him visible to the public. According to Mark Cerny, who worked in Tokyo as an intermediary between the Japanese and American Sega offices, the American staff felt that Sonic had no appeal. Although Katz was certain that Sonic would not be popular with American children, Kalinske arranged to place Sonic the Hedgehog as the pack-in game with the Genesis. Featuring speedy gameplay, Sonic the Hedgehog received critical acclaim. It greatly increased the popularity of the Sega Genesis in North America, credited with helping Sega gain 65% of the market share against Nintendo.

=== 1991–1995: Genesis sequels ===
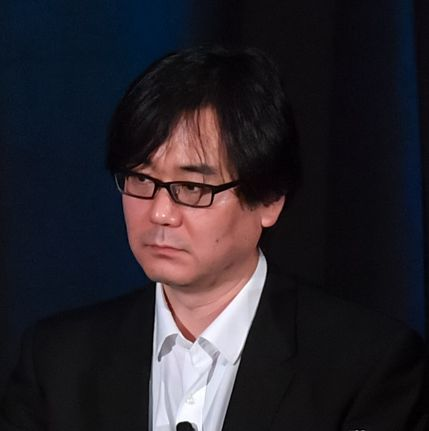
Hirokazu Yasuhara (pictured in 2018) designed most of the Genesis Sonic games.

Naka was dissatisfied with his treatment at Sega and felt he received little credit for his involvement in the success. He quit but was hired by Cerny to work at the US-based Sega Technical Institute (STI), with a higher salary and more creative freedom. Yasuhara also moved to STI. STI began work on Sonic the Hedgehog 2 (1992) in November 1991. Level artist Yasushi Yamaguchi designed Sonic's new sidekick, Tails, a flying two-tailed fox inspired by the mythological kitsune. Like its predecessor, Sonic the Hedgehog 2 was a major success, but its development suffered from the language barrier and cultural differences between the Japanese and American developers. While STI developed Sonic 2, Ohshima led a team in Japan to create Sonic CD for the Genesis's CD-ROM accessory, the Sega CD; it began as a port of the first game but evolved into a separate project.

After development on Sonic 2 concluded, Cerny departed and was replaced by Roger Hector. STI divided into two teams: the Japanese developers led by Naka, and the American developers. The Japanese began work on Sonic the Hedgehog 3. It was initially developed as an isometric game using the Sega Virtua Processor chip, but was restarted as a more conventional side-scrolling game after the chip was delayed. It introduced Sonic's rival Knuckles, created by artist Takashi Thomas Yuda. Due to an impending promotion with McDonald's and cartridge size constraints, the project was split in two: the first half, Sonic 3, was released in February 1994, and the second, Sonic & Knuckles, in October of the same year. The Sonic & Knuckles cartridge contains an adapter that allows players to connect it to Sonic 3, creating a combined game, Sonic 3 & Knuckles. Sonic 3 and Sonic & Knuckles, as with their predecessors, were acclaimed. To release a Sonic game in time for the 1993 holiday shopping season, Sega commissioned the American team to make a new game, the spin-off Sonic Spinball. While Spinball received mixed reviews, it sold well and helped build the reputation of its developers.

A number of Sonic games were developed for Sega's 8-bit consoles, the Master System and the handheld Game Gear. The first, an 8-bit version of the original Sonic, was developed by Ancient to promote the Game Gear and released in December 1991. Aspect Co. developed most of the subsequent 8-bit Sonic games, beginning with Sonic 2. Other Sonic games released during this period include Dr. Robotnik's Mean Bean Machine (1993), a Western localization of the Japanese puzzle game Puyo Puyo (1991), SegaSonic the Hedgehog (1993), an arcade game featuring isometric gameplay, and Knuckles' Chaotix (1995), a spin-off for the Genesis's 32X add-on starring Knuckles.

=== 1995–1998: Saturn era ===
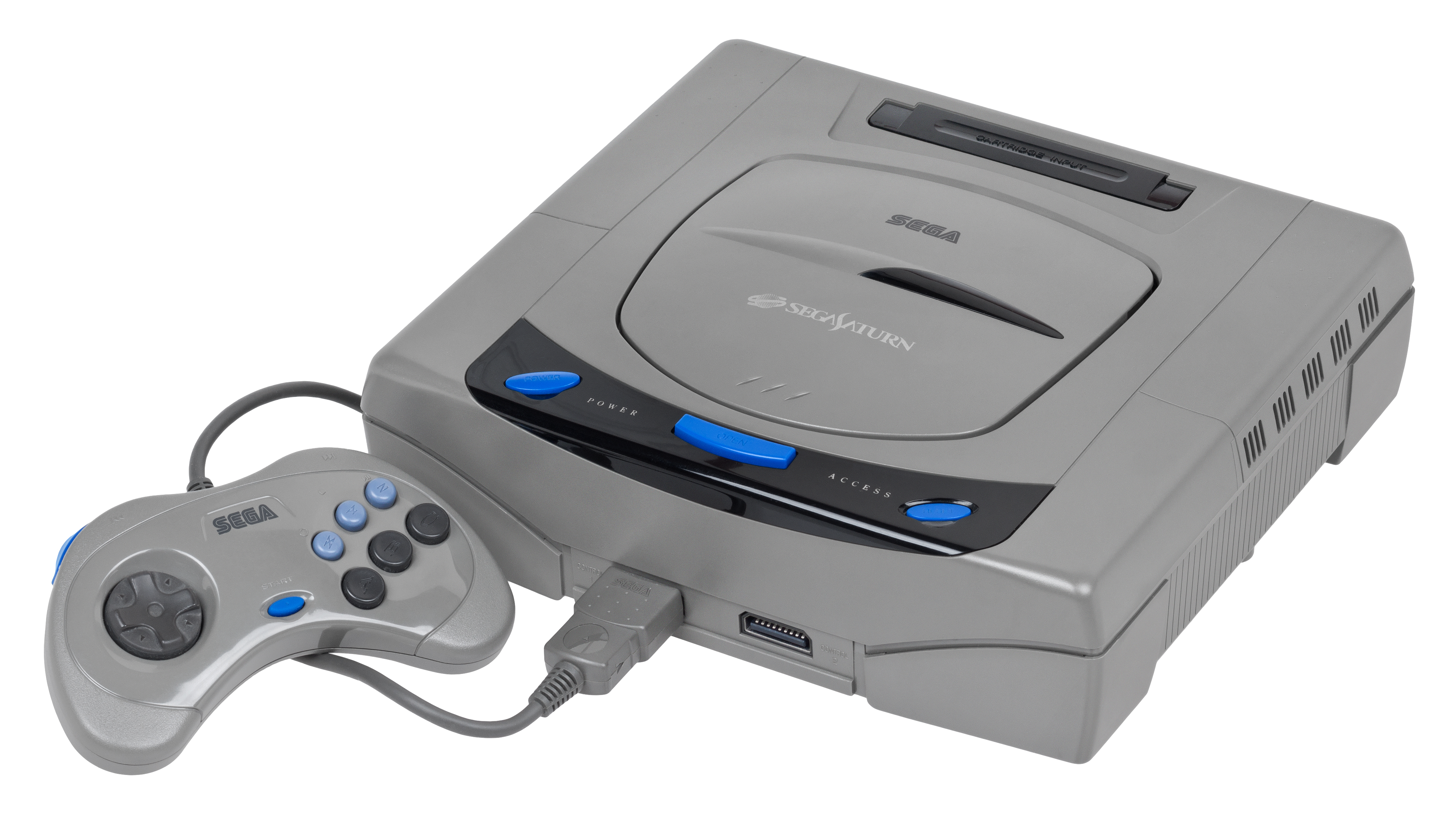
Few Sonic games were released for the Saturn. The cancellation of Sonic X-treme is considered a significant factor in the Saturn's commercial failure.

Following Sonic & Knuckles, Naka returned to Japan, having been offered a role as a producer. He was reunited with Ohshima and brought with him Takashi Iizuka, who had worked with Naka's team at STI. Sonic Team was officially formed as a brand, and began to work on a new intellectual property, Nights into Dreams (1996), for Sega's 32-bit Saturn console. In 1996, towards the end of the Genesis's lifecycle, Sega released Sonic 3D Blast, an isometric game based on the original Sonic 3 concept, as the Genesis still had a large install base. It was the final Sonic game produced for the Genesis, developed as a swan song. Since Sonic Team was developing Nights, 3D Blast was outsourced to the British studio Traveller's Tales. While it sold well, it was criticized for its gameplay, controls, and slow pace.

Meanwhile, in America, STI worked on Sonic X-treme, a 3D game for the Saturn intended for the 1996 holiday shopping season. Development was hindered by disputes between Sega of America and Japan, Naka's reported refusal to let STI use the Nights game engine, and problems adapting the series to 3D. After two lead developers became ill, X-treme was canceled. Journalists and fans have speculated about the impact X-treme might have had if it was released, with producer Mike Wallis believing it "definitely would have been competitive" with the first 3D Mario game, Super Mario 64 (1996). Due to X-treme's cancellation, Sega ported Sonic 3D Blast to the Saturn with updated graphics and bonus levels developed by Sonic Team.

In 1997, Sega announced "Project Sonic", a promotional campaign aimed at increasing market awareness of and renewing excitement for the Sonic brand. The first Project Sonic release was Sonic Jam, a compilation of the main Genesis Sonic games which included a 3D overworld Sonic Team used to experiment with 3D Sonic gameplay. Sonic Team and Traveller's Tales collaborated again on the second Project Sonic game, Sonic R, a 3D racing game and the only original Sonic game for the Saturn. Yasuhara moved to London to assist Sonic R's development. Sonic Jam was well received, while Sonic R's reviews were more divided. The cancellation of Sonic X-treme, as well as the Saturn's general lack of Sonic games, are considered important factors in the Saturn's commercial failure. According to Nick Thorpe of Retro Gamer, "By mid-1997 Sonic had essentially been shuffled into the background... it was astonishing to see that just six years after his debut, Sonic was already retro."

=== 1998–2005: Transition to 3D ===
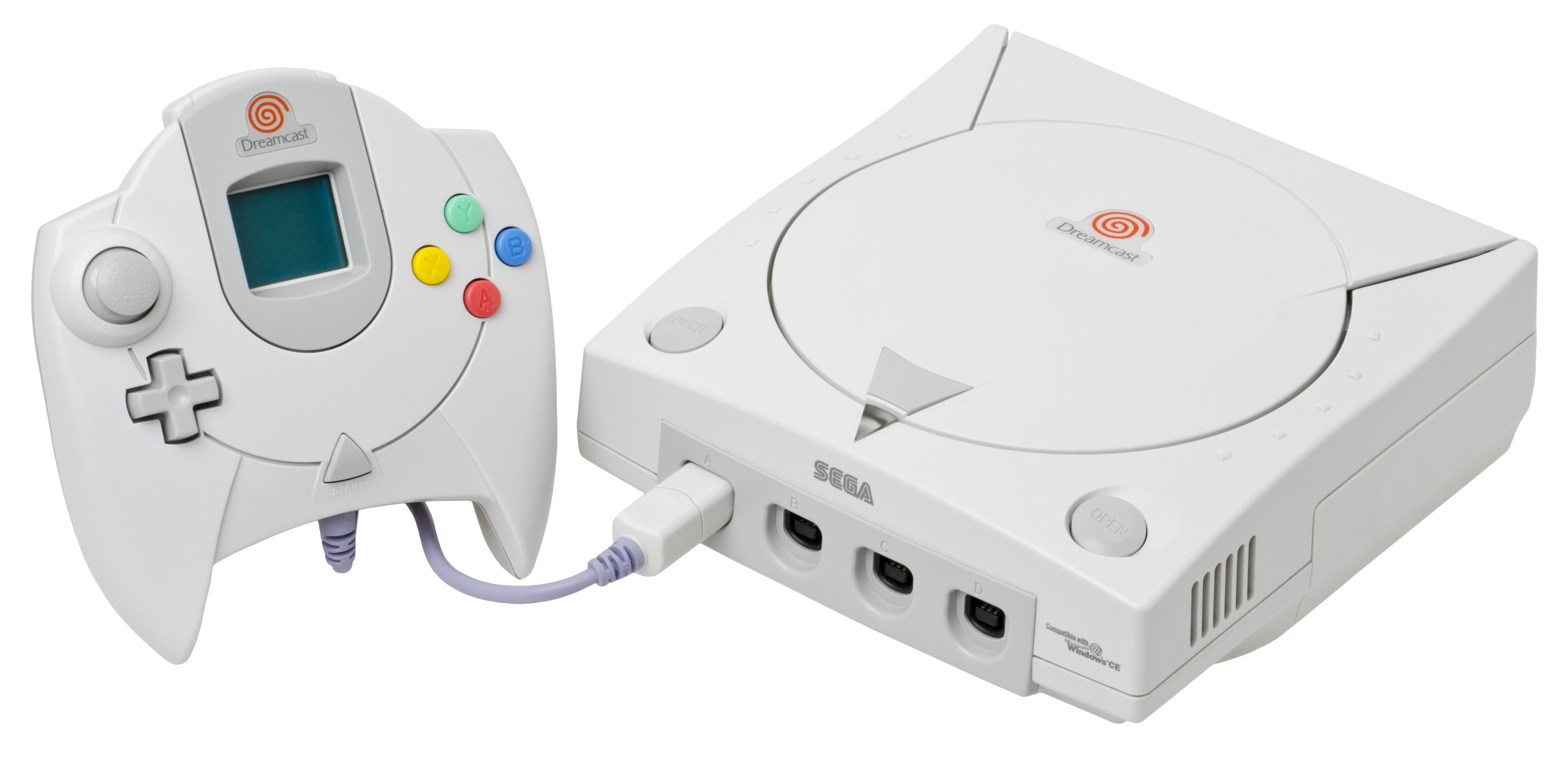
Sonic Adventure, the first major 3D Sonic game, was released for the Dreamcast in 1998

With its Sonic Jam experiments, Sonic Team began developing a 3D Sonic platformer for the Saturn. The project stemmed from a proposal by Iizuka to develop a Sonic role-playing video game (RPG) with an emphasis on storytelling. Development moved to Sega's new console, the Dreamcast, which Naka believed would allow for the ultimate Sonic game. Sonic Adventure, directed by Iizuka and released in 1998, was one of the first sixth-generation video games. It introduced elements that became series staples, such as Yuji Uekawa's new character designs influenced by comics and animation. In 1999, Iizuka and 11 other Sonic Team members relocated to San Francisco and established Sonic Team USA to develop the more action-oriented Sonic Adventure 2 (2001). Between the releases, Ohshima left Sega to form Artoon. While both Adventure games were well received and the first sold over two million copies, consumer interest in the Dreamcast quickly faded, and Sega's attempts to spur sales through lower prices and cash rebates caused escalating financial losses.

In January 2001, Sega announced it was discontinuing the Dreamcast to become a third-party developer; following this, Yasuhara left to join Naughty Dog. The following December, Sega released an expanded port of Sonic Adventure 2 for Nintendo's GameCube. Afterward, Sonic Team USA developed the first multi-platform Sonic game, Sonic Heroes (2003), for the GameCube, Microsoft's Xbox, and Sony's PlayStation 2. It was designed for a broad audience, and Sonic Team revived elements not seen since the Genesis era, such as special stages and the Chaotix characters. Reviews for Sonic Heroes were mixed; while its graphics and gameplay were praised, critics felt it failed to address criticisms of previous Sonic games, such as the camera. Iizuka, who directed Heroes, later said it was the most stressful experience of his career; he lost 22 pounds (10 kg) due to the crunch conditions. Sonic Team ported Sonic Adventure with additional content to the GameCube in 2003 and Windows in 2004, to mixed reviews.

Sega continued to release 2D Sonic games. In 1999, it collaborated with SNK to produce Sonic the Hedgehog Pocket Adventure, an adaptation of Sonic 2 for the Neo Geo Pocket Color. Some SNK staff formed Dimps the following year, and developed original 2D Sonic games—Sonic Advance (2001), Sonic Advance 2 (2002), and Sonic Advance 3 (2004)—for Nintendo's Game Boy Advance (GBA). Sonic Advance was the first original Sonic game released for a Nintendo console after Sega and Nintendo's fierce rivalry in the 1990s. It was outsourced to Dimps because Sonic Team was understaffed with employees familiar with the GBA. Dimps also developed Sonic Rush (2005) for the Nintendo DS, which uses a 2.5D perspective. Dimps's projects received generally favorable reviews. To introduce older games to new fans, Sonic Team developed two compilations, Sonic Mega Collection (2002) and Sonic Gems Collection (2005). Further spin-offs included the party game Sonic Shuffle (2000), the pinball game Sonic Pinball Party (2003) and the fighting game Sonic Battle (2003).

=== 2005–2010: Franchise struggles ===
Sonic Team USA was renamed Sega Studios USA after completing Sonic Heroes. Sega and Sonic Team leadership entered flux while they experimented with diverging from the Sonic formula. Sega Studios USA's first post-Heroes project was Shadow the Hedgehog (2005), a spin-off starring the popular Adventure 2 character Shadow. While Shadow retains most elements from previous Sonic games, it was aimed at a mature audience and introduced third-person shooting and nonlinear gameplay. Shadow the Hedgehog was panned for its controls, level design, and mature themes, but was a commercial success, selling at least 1.59 million copies.

In 2006, for the franchise's 15th anniversary, Sonic Team developed Sonic Riders, a GBA port of the original Sonic, and a reboot, Sonic the Hedgehog (commonly referred to as Sonic '06). With a darker and more realistic setting than previous entries, Sonic '06 was intended to relaunch the series for seventh-generation consoles such as the Xbox 360 and PlayStation 3. The development faced serious problems; Naka, the last of the original Sonic development team, resigned as head of Sonic Team to form Prope, and the team split so work could begin on a Wii Sonic game. According to Iizuka, these incidents, coupled with stringent Sega deadlines and an unpolished game engine, forced Sonic Team to rush development. None of the 15th-anniversary Sonic games were successful critically, and Sonic '06 became regarded as the worst game in the series, panned for its bugs, camera, controls, and story. Brian Shea of Game Informer wrote that it "[became] synonymous with the struggles the Sonic the Hedgehog franchise had faced in recent years. Sonic ['06] was meant to be a return to the series' roots, but it ended up damning the franchise in the eyes of many."

Backbone Entertainment developed two Sonic games exclusive to the PlayStation Portable, Sonic Rivals (2006) and Sonic Rivals 2 (2007). The first Sonic game for the Wii, Sonic and the Secret Rings (2007), takes place in the world of Arabian Nights and was released instead of a port of Sonic '06. Citing lengthy development times, Sega switched plans and conceived a game that would use the motion detection of the Wii Remote. Sega released a sequel, Sonic and the Black Knight, set in the world of King Arthur, in 2009. Secret Rings and Black Knight form what is known as the Sonic Storybook sub-series. A Sonic Riders sequel, Zero Gravity (2008), was developed for the Wii and PlayStation 2. Dimps returned to the Sonic series with Sonic Rush Adventure, a sequel to Sonic Rush, in 2007, while BioWare developed the first Sonic RPG, Sonic Chronicles: The Dark Brotherhood (2008), also for the DS.

Following Naka's departure, Akinori Nishiyama, who worked on the Sonic Advance and Rush games, became Sonic Team's general manager. Sonic Team began working on Sonic Unleashed (2008) in 2005. It was conceived as a sequel to Adventure 2, but became a standalone entry after Sonic Team introduced innovations to separate it from the Adventure games. With Unleashed, Sonic Team sought to combine the best aspects of 2D and 3D Sonic games and address criticisms of previous 3D entries, although reviews were mixed due to the addition of a beat 'em up game mode in which Sonic transforms into a werewolf-like beast. After Nishiyama was promoted in 2010, Iizuka was installed as the head of Sonic Team and became the Sonic producer.

=== 2010–2015: Refocusing ===
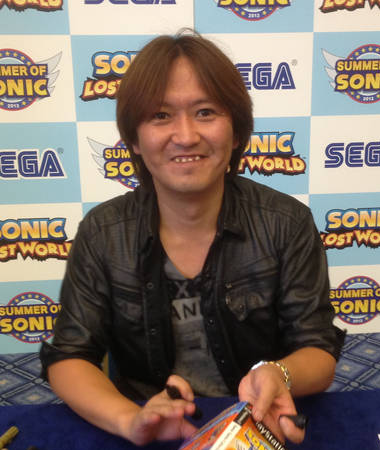
Takashi Iizuka, who directed the first three 3D Sonic games, has been the head of Sonic Team and Sonic's producer since 2010.

Iizuka felt Sonic was struggling because it lacked unified direction, so Sonic Team refocused on more traditional side-scrolling elements and fast-paced gameplay. Sonic the Hedgehog 4, a side-scrolling episodic sequel to Sonic & Knuckles developed by Sonic Team and Dimps, began with Episode I in 2010, followed by Episode II in 2012. Later in 2010, Sega released Sonic Colors for the Wii and DS, which expanded on the well received aspects of Unleashed and introduced the Wisp power-ups. For the series' 20th anniversary in 2011, Sega released Sonic Generations for the Xbox 360, PlayStation 3, and Windows; a separate version was developed by Dimps for the Nintendo 3DS. Sonic Generations featured reimagined versions of levels from previous Sonic games and reintroduced the "classic" Sonic design from the Genesis era. These efforts were better received, especially in comparison to Sonic '06 and Unleashed.

In May 2013, Nintendo announced it was collaborating with Sega to produce Sonic games for its Wii U and 3DS platforms. The first game in the partnership, 2013's Sonic Lost World, was also the first Sonic game for eighth-generation hardware. Sonic Lost World was designed to be streamlined and fluid in movement and design, borrowing elements from Nintendo's Super Mario Galaxy games and the canceled X-treme. The second was Mario & Sonic at the Sochi 2014 Olympic Winter Games (2013) for the Wii U, the fourth Mario & Sonic game and a 2014 Winter Olympics tie-in. The deal was completed in 2014 with the release of Sonic Boom: Rise of Lyric for the Wii U and Sonic Boom: Shattered Crystal for the 3DS; these games are part of a spin-off franchise which includes a television series and comic books. Sonic Lost World polarized critics, while critics found Mario & Sonic at the Sochi 2014 Olympic Winter Games mediocre and panned the Sonic Boom games. Sonic Boom: Fire & Ice, a Shattered Crystal sequel, was released in 2016.

Sega began to release more Sonic games for mobile phones, such as iOS and Android devices. After Australian programmer Christian "Taxman" Whitehead developed a version of Sonic CD for modern consoles in 2011, he collaborated with fellow Sonic fan Simon "Stealth" Thomley to develop remakes of the original Sonic the Hedgehog and Sonic the Hedgehog 2 for iOS and Android, which were released in 2013. The remasters were developed using Whitehead's Retro Engine, an engine tailored for 2D projects, and received praise. Sonic Dash (2013), a Temple Run–style endless runner, was developed by Hardlight and downloaded over 350 million times by 2020 and received a Sonic Boom–themed sequel in 2015. Sonic Team released Sonic Runners, its first game for mobile devices, in 2015. Sonic Runners was also an endless runner, but was unsuccessful and was discontinued a year after release. Gameloft released a sequel, Sonic Runners Adventure, in 2017 to generally positive reviews.

=== 2015–present: New directions ===
In a 2015 interview with Polygon, Iizuka acknowledged that contemporary Sonic games had been disappointing. He hoped that the Sonic Team logo would stand as a "mark of quality"; he planned to release quality games and expand the Sonic brand while retaining the modern Sonic design. Iizuka later said that Sega had canceling the Sonic franchise and that he had fought to continue it.

Iizuka and most of Sonic Team relocated to Burbank, California, to oversee the franchise with a new team. At San Diego Comic-Con in July 2016, Sega announced two Sonic games to coincide with the series' 25th anniversary: Sonic Mania and Sonic Forces. Both were released for the PlayStation 4, Xbox One, Nintendo Switch, and Windows in 2017. Sonic Mania was developed by the independent game developers PagodaWest Games and Headcannon with a staff comprising members of the Sonic fandom; Whitehead conceived the project and served as director. The game, which emulates the gameplay and visuals of the Genesis entries, received the best reviews for a Sonic game in 15 years. Meanwhile, Sonic Team developed Sonic Forces, which revives the dual gameplay of Sonic Generations along with a third gameplay style featuring the player's custom character. Sonic Forces received mixed reviews, with criticism for its short length.

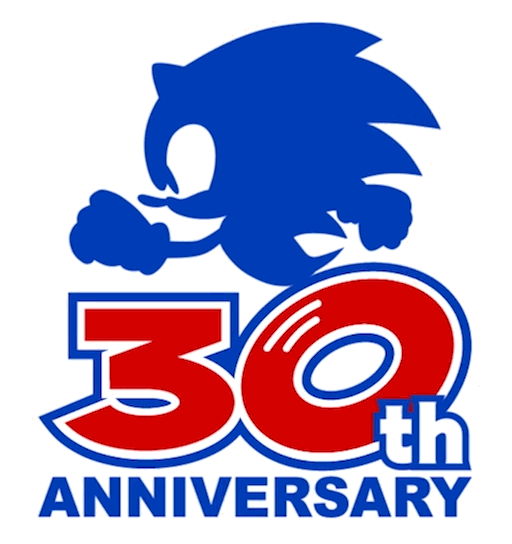
Sonic 30th Anniversary logo

In 2019, Sega released a kart racing game, Team Sonic Racing (2019), developed by Sumo Digital. In May 2021, Sega announced several projects for Sonic's 30th anniversary, including a remaster of Sonic Colors, the compilation Sonic Origins, and the 2022 game Sonic Frontiers. Frontiers was the first Sonic game to feature open-world design, and Iizuka expressed hope that it would inform future games in a similar way to Sonic Adventure. Frontiers received positive reviews, with critics and fans considering it a flawed but promising new direction, and sold well.

2023 Sonic releases included The Murder of Sonic the Hedgehog, a free visual novel, Sonic Dream Team, an Apple Arcade-exclusive 3D platformer, and Sonic Superstars, a 2.5D side-scrolling game featuring the classic Sonic design. Superstars was co-developed by Ohshima's studio Arzest and he designed a new character, his first contribution to the series since Sonic Adventure. Iizuka said the 2D and 3D Sonic games would continue independently going forward and Sonic Team would try to keep them as different as possible.

In 2024, Sonic media emphasized Shadow the Hedgehog as part of Sega's "Fearless: Year of Shadow" campaign. This included the release of Shadow Generations, a short Shadow game bundled with a rerelease of Sonic Generations; Shadow-themed events in the mobile games Sonic Dash and Sonic Forces: Speed Battle; music from Shadow the Hedgehog in the Sonic Symphony World Tour; and Shadow playing a prominent role in the film Sonic the Hedgehog 3.

== Characters and story ==
Promotional artwork: Ohshima's original design (left) and Uekawa's Sonic Adventure redesign (right)

The Sonic franchise is known for its large cast of characters; Sonic the Fighters (1996) producer Yu Suzuki joked that anyone who makes a Sonic game has the duty to create new characters. The first game introduced Sonic, a blue hedgehog who can run at incredible speeds, and Doctor Eggman, a rotund mad scientist. During the Genesis era, Eggman was referred to as Doctor Ivo Robotnik in Western territories. Sega of America's Dean Sitton made the change without consulting the Japanese developers, who did not want a single character to have two different names. Since Sonic Adventure, the character has been referred to as Eggman in all territories, although the Robotnik name is still acknowledged.

Sonic games traditionally follow Sonic's efforts to stop Eggman, who schemes to obtain the Chaos Emeralds—seven (Note: In the original Sonic the Hedgehog, there are only six Chaos Emeralds.) gems of extraterrestrial origin with mystical powers. The Emeralds can turn thoughts into power, warp time and space with a technique called Chaos Control, give energy to living things, and be used to create nuclear or laser-based weaponry. They typically act as MacGuffins in the stories. Eggman seeks the Emeralds in his quest to conquer the world, and traps animals in aggressive robots and prison capsules. Because Sonic Team was inspired by the culture of the 1990s, Sonic features environmental themes. Sonic represents "nature", while Eggman represents "machinery" and "development"—a play on the then-growing debate between environmentalists and developers.

Much of the supporting cast was introduced in the succeeding games for the Genesis and its add-ons. Sonic 2 introduced Sonic's sidekick Miles "Tails" Prower, a fox who can fly using his two tails. Sonic CD introduced Amy Rose, a pink hedgehog and Sonic's self-proclaimed girlfriend, and Metal Sonic, a robotic doppelgänger of Sonic created by Eggman. Sonic 3 introduced Sonic's rival Knuckles, a red echidna and the guardian of the Master Emerald. The Master Emerald, introduced in Sonic & Knuckles, controls the power of the Chaos Emeralds. Knuckles' Chaotix introduced the Chaotix, a group comprising Vector the Crocodile, Espio the Chameleon and Charmy Bee. Three characters introduced during this period, Mighty the Armadillo and Ray the Flying Squirrel from SegaSonic the Hedgehog and Fang the Sniper from Sonic Triple Trouble (1994), faded into obscurity, but became prominent characters again in Sonic Mania and Superstars.

During Sonic Adventure's development, Sonic Team discovered that the character designs were too simple for a 3D environment. The art style was modernized to alter the characters' proportions and make them appeal to Western audiences. Since Sonic Adventure, the series' cast has expanded. Notable characters include Big, a large cat who fishes for his pet frog Froggy; the E-100 Series of robots; Shadow, a brooding black hedgehog; Rouge, a treasure-hunting bat; Cream, a polite young rabbit; Blaze, a cat from an alternate dimension; and Silver, a telekinetic hedgehog from the future. The Chao creatures function as digital pets and minor gameplay elements, and Wisp creatures function as power-ups. Flicky, the blue bird from Sega's 1984 arcade game, appears in several Sonic games, particularly 3D Blast.

Some Sonic characters have featured in spin-off games. Eggman is the featured character of Dr. Robotnik's Mean Bean Machine, a Western localization of Puyo Puyo. Sega replaced the Puyo Puyo characters with Sonic characters because it feared Puyo Puyo would not be popular with a Western audience. In 1995, Sega released the Knuckles spinoff Knuckles' Chaotix for the 32X, and two Tails spin-offs for Game Gear: Tails' Skypatrol (a scrolling shooter) and Tails Adventure (a Metroidvania game). Shadow the Hedgehog (2005) was developed in response to the Shadow character's popularity and to introduce "gun action" gameplay to the franchise. Iizuka has said that future spin-offs, such as sequels to Knuckles' Chaotix and Shadow the Hedgehog or a Big the Cat game, remain possibilities.

== Gameplay ==
Examples of gameplay in Sonic the Hedgehog 2 (1992) and Sonic Unleashed (2008), illustrating some of the core game mechanics of 2D and 3D Sonic games

The Sonic series is characterized by speed-based platforming gameplay. Controlling the player character, the player navigates a series of levels at high speeds while jumping between platforms, fighting enemies and bosses, and avoiding obstacles. The series contains both 2D and 3D games. 2D entries generally feature simple, pinball-like gameplay—with jumping and attacking controlled by a single button—and branching level paths that require memorization to maintain speed. Meanwhile, 3D entries tend to be more linear in design, feature various level objectives, different movesets, and allow players to upgrade and customize the playable character. Games since Sonic Unleashed have blended 2D and 3D gameplay, with the camera shifting between side-scrolling and third-person perspectives.

One distinctive game mechanic of Sonic games are collectible golden rings spread throughout levels, which act as a form of health. Players possessing rings can survive upon sustaining damage, but the rings are scattered and the player has a short amount of time to re-collect some of them before they disappear. Collecting 100 rings usually rewards the player an extra life. Rings have other uses in certain games, such as currency in Sonic '06, restoring health bars in Sonic Unleashed, or improving statistics in Sonic Riders. Levels in Sonic games feature elements such as slopes, bottomless pits, and vertical loops. Springs, springboards, and dash panels are scattered throughout and catapult the player at high speeds in a particular direction. Players' progress in levels is saved through passing checkpoints. Checkpoints serve other uses in various games, such as entering bonus stages. Some settings, particularly Green Hill Zone, recur throughout the series.

The series contains numerous power-ups, which are held in boxes that appear throughout levels. An icon indicates what it contains, and the player releases the item by destroying the box. Common items in boxes include rings, a shield, invincibility, high speed, and extra lives. Sonic Colors introduces the Wisps, a race of extraterrestrial creatures that act as power-ups. Each Wisp has its own special ability corresponding to its color; for instance, yellow Wisps allow players to drill underground and find otherwise inaccessible areas. Since Sonic Rush, most Sonic games have featured "boosting", a mechanic that immediately propels Sonic forward at top speed when activated. While boosting, Sonic can smash through objects, destroy enemies instantly, or access different level paths. This requires players to react to forthcoming obstacles quickly; Sonic Unleashed introduced side-stepping and drifting maneuvers to allow players to maintain speed. The boosting mechanic uses a gauge replenished by collecting rings or Wisps.

In most Sonic games, the goal is to collect the Chaos Emeralds; the player is required to collect them all to defeat Eggman and achieve the games' good endings. Sonic games that do not feature the Chaos Emeralds, such as Sonic CD, feature different collectibles that otherwise function the same. Players find the Emeralds by entering portals, opening portals using 50 rings, or scouting them within levels themselves. Sometimes, the Emeralds are collected automatically as the story progresses. By collecting the Emeralds, players are rewarded with their characters' "Super" form and can activate it by collecting 50 rings in a stage. The Super transformations grant the player character more speed, a farther jump, and invincibility, but their ring count drains by the second; the transformation lasts until all the rings have been used. Some games require the player to collect all the Chaos Emeralds to reach the final boss.

Sonic games often share basic gameplay, but some have game mechanics that distinguish them from others. For instance, Knuckles' Chaotix is similar to previous entries in the series, but introduces a partner system whereby the player is connected to another character via a tether; the tether behaves like a rubber band and must be used to maneuver the characters. Sonic Unleashed introduces the Werehog, a beat 'em up gameplay style in which Sonic transforms into a werewolf-like beast and must fight enemies using brute strength. Both the Sonic Storybook games feature unique concepts: Secret Rings is controlled exclusively using the Wii Remote's motion detection, while Black Knight incorporates hack and slash gameplay. While some games feature Sonic as the only playable character, others feature multiple, who have alternate movesets and storylines. For instance, in Sonic & Knuckles, Knuckles goes through the same levels as Sonic, but his story is different, he explores different parts of the levels, and certain areas are more difficult.

Many Sonic games contain multiplayer and cooperative gameplay, beginning with Sonic the Hedgehog 2. In some games, if the player chooses to control Sonic and Tails together, a second player can join at any time and control Tails separately. Sonic games also feature a split-screen competitive mode in which two players race to the end of the stage.

== Music ==
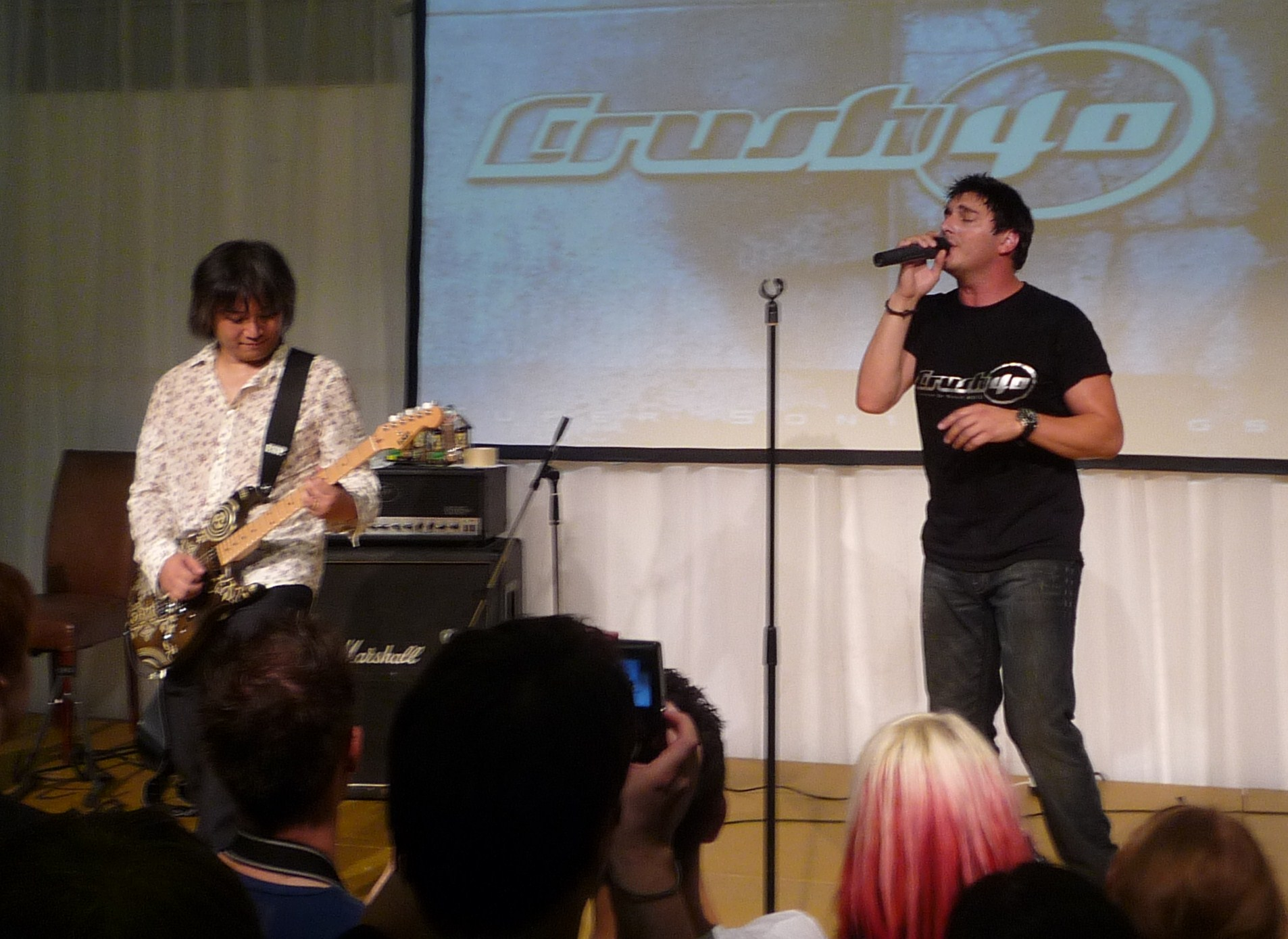
Jun Senoue (left) and his band Crush 40 have composed music for most Sonic games since Sonic 3D Blast (1996).

For the original Sonic the Hedgehog, Sega commissioned Masato Nakamura, bassist and songwriter of the J-pop band Dreams Come True, to compose the soundtrack. Nakamura returned to compose Sonic 2's soundtrack. Dreams Come True owns the rights to Nakamura's score, which created problems when the Sonic Spinball team used his Sonic theme music without permission. For Sonic CD, two soundtracks were composed; the original, featured in the Japanese and European releases, was composed by Naofumi Hataya and Masafumi Ogata, while the North American score was composed by Spencer Nilsen, David Young, and Mark Crew.

A number of composers contributed to the Sonic the Hedgehog 3 score, including Sega sound staff and independent contractors recruited to finish the game on schedule. According to conflicting sources, American pop musician Michael Jackson, a Sonic fan, composed music for Sonic 3. Ohshima and Hector said Jackson's involvement was terminated and his music removed following the first allegations of sexual abuse against him, but composers involved with the project said his contributions remained.

Sonic 3 was the first Sonic game composer Jun Senoue worked on. Senoue has composed the music for many Sonic games since Sonic 3D Blast, (Note: Senoue was the lead composer for Sonic 3D Blast (1996), Sonic Adventure (1998), Sonic Adventure 2 (2001), Sonic Heroes (2003), Shadow the Hedgehog (2005), Sonic and the Black Knight (2009), Sonic the Hedgehog 4 (2010 and 2012), Sonic Generations (2011), and Team Sonic Racing (2019).) often with his band Crush 40, which he formed with Hardline vocalist Johnny Gioeli. While the Genesis Sonic soundtracks were characterized by electropop, Senoue's scores typically feature funk and rock music. Tomoya Ohtani has been the series' sound director since Sonic the Hedgehog in 2006, and was the lead composer for that game, Sonic Unleashed, Sonic Colors, Sonic Lost World, Sonic Runners, and Sonic Forces. Ohtani said he attempts to "express through music the greatest features each game has", citing the diverse and energetic score of Sonic Unleashed and the more science fiction-style score of Sonic Colors as examples.

Other composers who have contributed to Sonic games include Richard Jacques and Hideki Naganuma. Tee Lopes—known for releasing unofficial remixes of Sonic tracks on YouTube—was the lead composer for Sonic Mania and a contributor to Team Sonic Racing. The main theme of the 2006 Sonic the Hedgehog was performed by Ali Tabatabaee and Matty Lewis of the band Zebrahead, while Akon remixed "Sweet Sweet Sweet" for its soundtrack. Doug Robb, the lead singer of Hoobastank, performed the main theme of Sonic Forces. One of the ending themes of Sonic Frontiers, "Vandalize", was performed by the Japanese rock band One Ok Rock.

== Other media ==
=== Crossovers ===
Outside the Sonic series, Sonic appears in other Sonic Team games as a playable character in Christmas Nights (1996), a power-up in Billy Hatcher and the Giant Egg (2003), and in a cameo in the 2008 Wii version of Samba de Amigo (1999). Sonic characters also feature in the Sega All-Stars series, which includes Sega Superstars (2004), Sega Superstars Tennis (2008), and Sumo Digital's kart racing games Sonic & Sega All-Stars Racing (2010) and Sonic & All-Stars Racing Transformed (2012).

From 2007 to 2020, Sega collaborated with Nintendo to produce Mario & Sonic, an Olympic Games-themed crossover with the Mario franchise. The first Mario & Sonic game was released in 2007 for the Wii and in 2008 for the DS to tie in with the 2008 Summer Olympics. Mario & Sonic at the Olympic Winter Games, based on the 2010 Winter Olympics, was released in 2009 for the Wii and DS, and Mario & Sonic at the London 2012 Olympic Games, based on the 2012 Summer Olympics, was released for the Wii in 2011 and the 3DS in 2012. The fourth game, Mario & Sonic at the Sochi 2014 Olympic Winter Games (2013), was exclusive to the Wii U, but the following game, Mario & Sonic at the Rio 2016 Olympic Games (2016), was released on both the Wii U and 3DS. After a brief hiatus, the series returned in 2019 with Mario & Sonic at the Olympic Games Tokyo 2020 for the Switch, based on the 2020 Summer Olympics. The International Olympic Committee opted not to renew its licensing deal with Sega and Nintendo in 2020, effectively ending the series.

Sonic appears as a playable character in Nintendo's Super Smash Bros. crossover fighting games, beginning with Super Smash Bros. Brawl in 2008. Alongside Solid Snake from Konami's Metal Gear franchise, Sonic was the first non-Nintendo character to appear in Smash. He was considered for inclusion in Super Smash Bros. Melee (2001), but the game was too close to completion so his introduction was delayed until Brawl. He returned in the sequels Super Smash Bros. for Nintendo 3DS and Wii U (2014) and Super Smash Bros. Ultimate (2018). Shadow and Knuckles appear in Smash as non-playable characters, while Tails and Knuckles costumes are available for players' Mii avatars. A Sonic amiibo figurine was released for the Smash games, and is also compatible with Mario Kart 8 (2014), Super Mario Maker (2015), and Yoshi's Woolly World (2015).

In June 2015, characters from the Angry Birds RPG Angry Birds Epic (2014) appeared as playable characters in Sonic Dash during a three-week promotion, while Sonic was added to Angry Birds Epic as a playable character the following September. Similar crossovers with the Sanrio characters Hello Kitty, Badtz-Maru, My Melody, and Chococat and the Namco game Pac-Man took place in December 2016 and February 2018. In November 2016, a Sonic expansion pack was released for the toys-to-life game Lego Dimensions (2015); the pack includes Sonic as a playable character, in addition to Sonic levels and vehicles. In September 2021, Sonic and Tails became playable characters in Cookie Run: Kingdom. In August 2026, the Sonic the Hedgehog series collaborated with Fortnite, with a Sonic outfit and Tails sidekick as part of the season's battle pass, and rings, a Sonic Power Sneakers item, and Eggman fight in Fortnite Battle Royale.

=== Animation ===
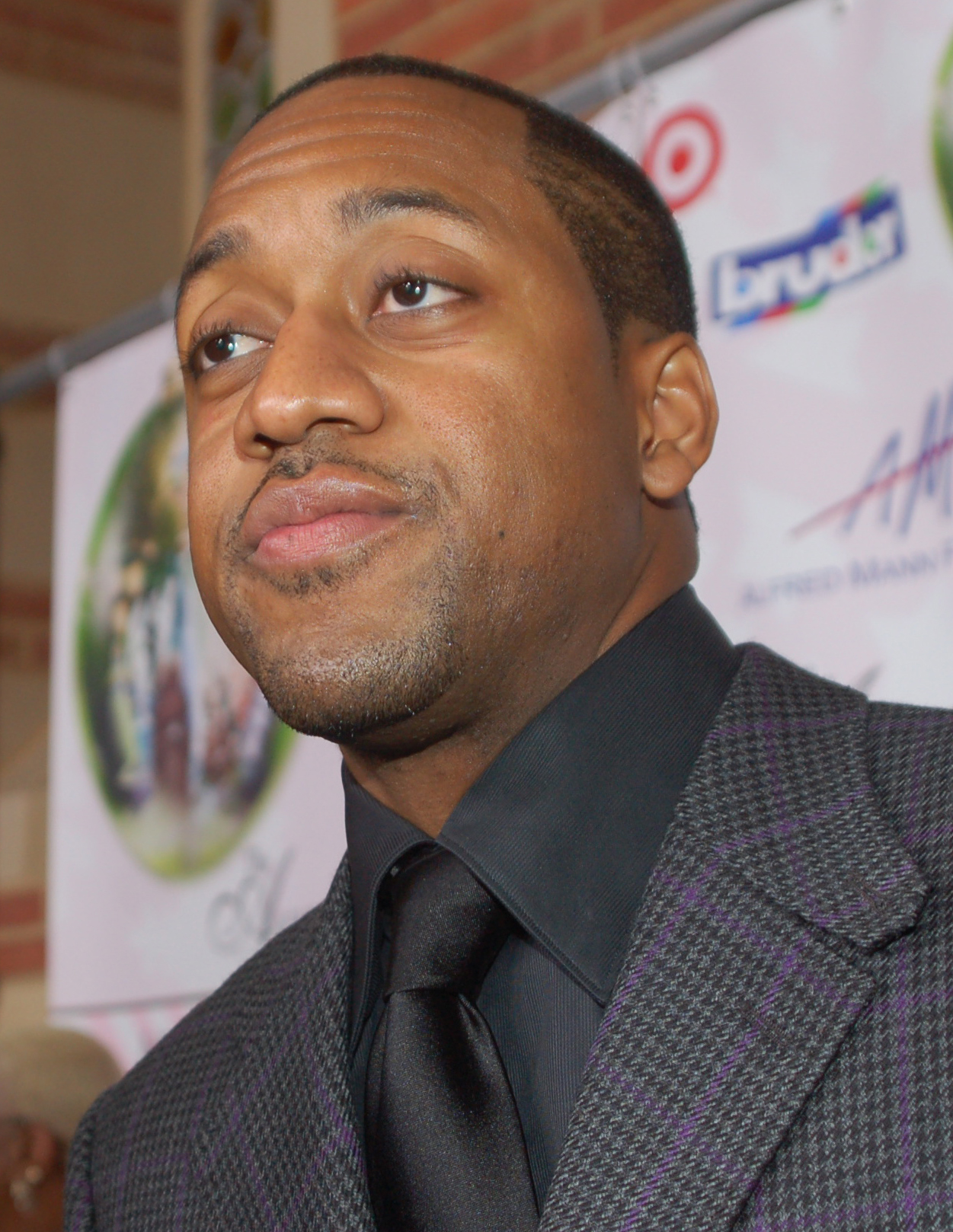
Jaleel White voiced Sonic in DIC Entertainment's three Sonic animated series.

In 1992, Sega approached the American Broadcasting Company (ABC) about producing two television series—"a syndicated show for the after-school audience" and a Saturday-morning cartoon—based on Sonic. Kalinske "had seen how instrumental the launch of He-Man and the Masters of the Universe cartoon series was to the success of the toyline" during his time at Mattel and believed that success could be recreated using Sonic. The two cartoons, the syndicated Adventures of Sonic the Hedgehog (1993) and ABC's Sonic the Hedgehog (1993–1994), were produced by DIC Entertainment. DIC also produced a Sonic Christmas special in 1996, and Sonic Underground in 1999, to promote Sonic Adventure. DIC's Sonic adaptations are generally not held in high regard.

Adventures of Sonic the Hedgehog comprises 65 episodes overseen by Ren & Stimpy director Kent Butterworth and features slapstick humor in the vein of Looney Tunes. The 26-episode Sonic the Hedgehog (commonly called Sonic SatAM) features a bleak setting in which Eggman has conquered the world, while Sonic is a member of a resistance force that opposes him. The series was canceled after two seasons. Sonic Underground was planned to last 65 episodes, but only 40 were produced. The series follows Sonic and his siblings Manic and Sonia, who use the power of music to fight Eggman and reunite with their mother. In all three DiC series, Sonic is voiced by Family Matters star Jaleel White.

In Japan, Sega and Sonic Team collaborated with Studio Pierrot to produce a two-part original video animation (OVA), Sonic the Hedgehog, released direct-to-video in Japan in 1996. To coincide with Sonic Adventure's Western release in 1999, ADV Films released the OVA in North America as a 55-minute film, Sonic the Hedgehog: The Movie. Produced with input from Naka and Ohshima, the OVA is loosely based on Sonic CD, with elements from Sonic the Hedgehog 2 and 3, and recounts Sonic's efforts to stop a generator taken over by Eggman from exploding and destroying their world. Patrick Lee of The A.V. Club said the OVA was "the only cartoon to adapt the look, sound, and feel of the Sonic games", with familiar scenes and music.

Sonic X, a 78-episode anime series produced by TMS Entertainment and overseen by Naka, ran for three seasons (78 episodes) from 2003 to 2006. While previous series' episodes feature self-contained plots, Sonic X tells a single serialized story. The Sonic cast teleports from their home planet to Earth during a scuffle with Eggman, where they meet a human boy, Chris Thorndyke. Throughout the course of the series, Sonic and his friends attempt to return to their world while fighting Eggman. The second season adapts the Sonic Adventure games and Sonic Battle, while the third season sees the friends return with Chris to their world, where they meet an alien named Cosmo and enter outer space to fight an army of aliens called the Metarex. Some critics enjoyed Sonic X, while others disliked it. Although it suffered from poor ratings in Japan, Sonic X consistently topped ratings for its timeslot in the US and France.

Sonic Boom, a 104-episode animated television series produced by Sega and Genao Productions, premiered on Cartoon Network in November 2014. It features a satirical take on the Sonic mythos, and the franchise's cast was redesigned for it. According to Iizuka, Sonic Boom came about as a desire to appeal more to Western audiences, and it ran parallel with the main Sonic franchise. Sonic Boom lasted for two seasons and the last episode aired in 2017. In May 2020, Sega brand officer Ivo Gerscovich stated that no further episodes of Sonic Boom would be produced.

To promote the release of Sonic Mania Plus (2018), a five-part series of animated shorts, Sonic Mania Adventures, was released on the Sonic the Hedgehog YouTube channel between March 30 and July 17, 2018. The series depicts Classic Sonic's return to his world following the events of Sonic Forces, teaming up with his friends—Tails, Knuckles, Mighty, and Ray—to prevent Eggman and Metal Sonic from collecting the Chaos Emeralds and Master Emerald. An additional Christmas-themed episode, in which Amy finds and helps an abandoned Metal Sonic, was released on December 21, 2018. The shorts were written and directed by Tyson Hesse, who created Sonic Mania's opening cutscene. Hesse has contributed to other animated Sonic short films since, including a two-part Team Sonic Racing series and the Christmas special Chao in Space in 2019, a two-part Sonic Colors series in 2021, a Sonic Frontiers prequel in 2022, and a Sonic Superstars prequel in 2023. Sonic and Tails also appeared as guest stars in OK K.O.! Let's Be Heroes in August 2019.

Sonic Prime, a 24-episode animated Sonic series, began airing on Netflix in December 2022. The series was co-produced by Netflix Animation, Sega of America, WildBrain Studios, and Man of Action Entertainment, and unlike prior adaptations, it is canon to the events of the Sonic games. It follows Sonic as he is sent into a multiverse after accidentally shattering a gem called the Paradox Prism during a battle with Eggman and encounters alternate-universe counterparts of Sonic characters. On September 14, 2026, it was announced that a preschool Sonic animated series is in production for Netflix.

=== Comics ===
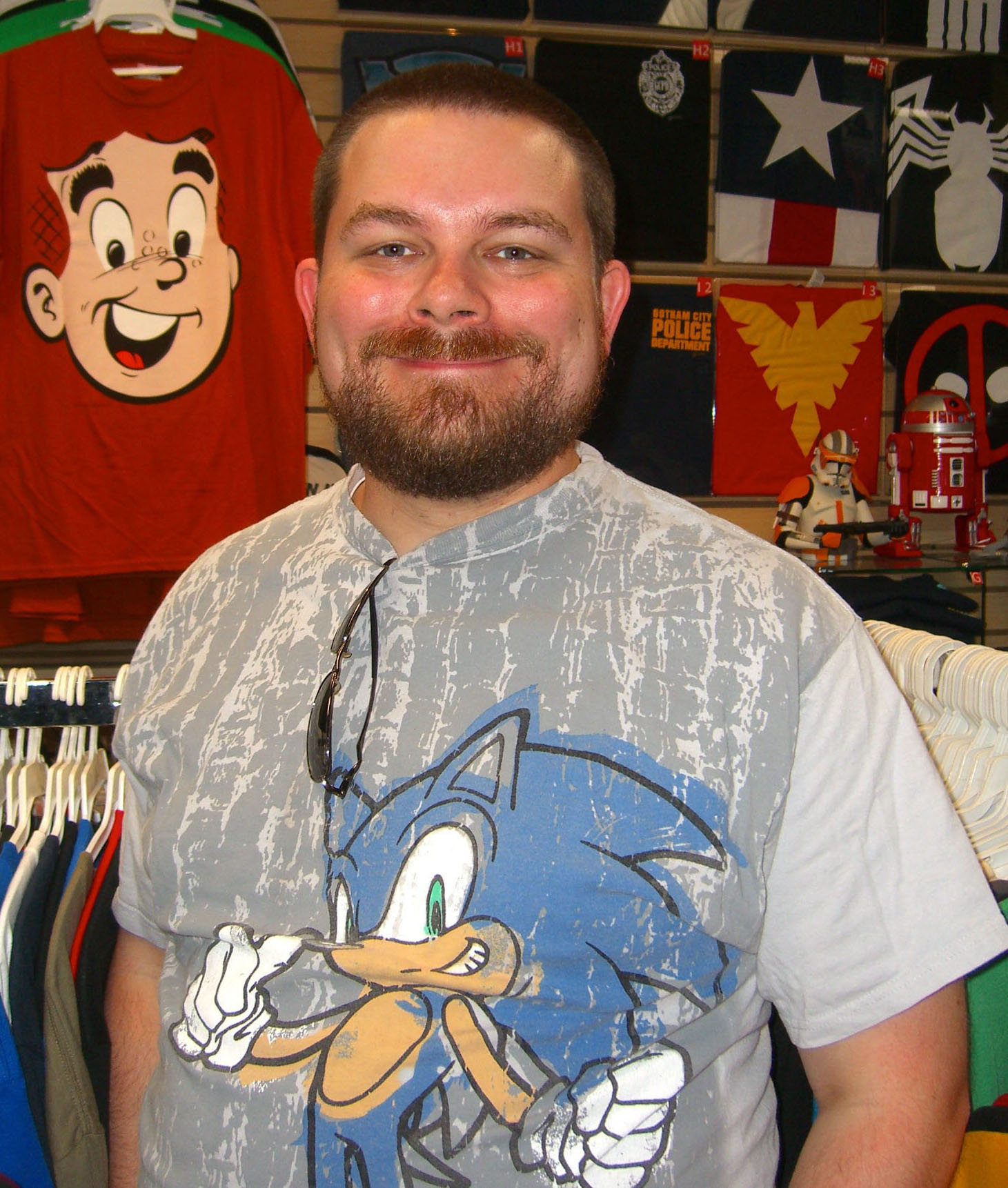
Ian Flynn has been a lead writer on Sonic the Hedgehog comics since 2006. He also contributed to other Sonic media, including the script for Sonic Frontiers (2022).

Shogakukan published a Sonic the Hedgehog manga series in its Shogaku Yonensei magazine, beginning in 1992. Written by Kenji Terada and illustrated by Sango Norimoto, it follows a sweet but cowardly young hedgehog named Nicky whose alter ego is the cocky, heroic Sonic. According to character artist Kazuyuki Hoshino, the manga was part of Sega's promotional strategy to appeal to primary school children. The Sonic design team worked with Shogakukan to create new characters; Amy Rose and Charmy Bee originated in the manga before appearing in the games.

Sonic the Comic, a British comic published by Fleetway Publications, ran for 223 issues from 1993 to 2002; contributors included Richard Elson, Nigel Kitching, Andy Diggle, and Nigel Dobbyn. It featured stories, news and reviews aimed at children. Although it adapted the stories of the games, the writers established their own continuity. The final story arc was a loose adaptation of Sonic Adventure in 2000, followed by 39 issues reprinting old stories. Following the series' cancellation, fans started Sonic the Comic Online, an unofficial webcomic that continues the stories.

The longest-running Sonic-based publication, Sonic the Hedgehog, was published by the American comic publisher Archie Comics for 290 issues from 1993 until its cancellation in 2017. Archie also published a number of spin-offs, such as Knuckles the Echidna (1997–2000) and Sonic Universe (2009–2017). Archie's comic drew its premise from the Sonic the Hedgehog television series, with Sonic and a resistance force fighting the dictator Eggman. It began as an upbeat action-comedy, but became more dramatic after Ken Penders began writing with issue #11 in 1994. Penders remained the head writer for the following 150 issues and developed an elaborate lore unique to the series. Ian Flynn became head writer in 2006 and remained until the series' cancellation. Following a legal battle with Penders over ownership of characters he created, a 2013 reboot left only characters introduced in the games or which predated Penders' run.

In 2008, Guinness World Records recognized Archie's Sonic the Hedgehog as the longest-running comic based on a video game, and by 2016 it was one of the longest-running American comics in the market. While Archie planned to publish at least four issues beyond #290, in January 2017 the series went on an abrupt hiatus, and in July, Sega announced it was ending its business relationship with Archie in favor of IDW Publishing. IDW's Sonic comic began in April 2018. Although the creative teams from the Archie series, such as Flynn, returned, the IDW series is set in a different continuity. Flynn said the IDW series differs from the Archie comic in that it draws from the games for stories, with the first story arc set after the events of Sonic Forces. Fans continued the Archie series unofficially, including finishing unpublished issues, while Penders is using his characters for a graphic novel, The Lara-Su Chronicles.

Sega and DC Comics announced a Sonic-themed partnership on Batman Day 2024. The partnership began with DC x Sonic the Hedgehog (2025), a five-issue limited series written by Flynn and penciled by Adam Bryce Thomas. It follows the Sonic cast teaming up with the Justice League to stop the DC villain Darkseid from invading the Sonic universe. It was accompanied by merchandise depicting Sonic characters as DC superheroes, including Sonic as the Flash and Shadow as Batman. A second five-issue series, DC x Sonic the Hedgehog: Metal Legion (2026), follows the Sonic cast and the Justice League battling Eggman and the Legion of Doom.

=== Live-action film series ===
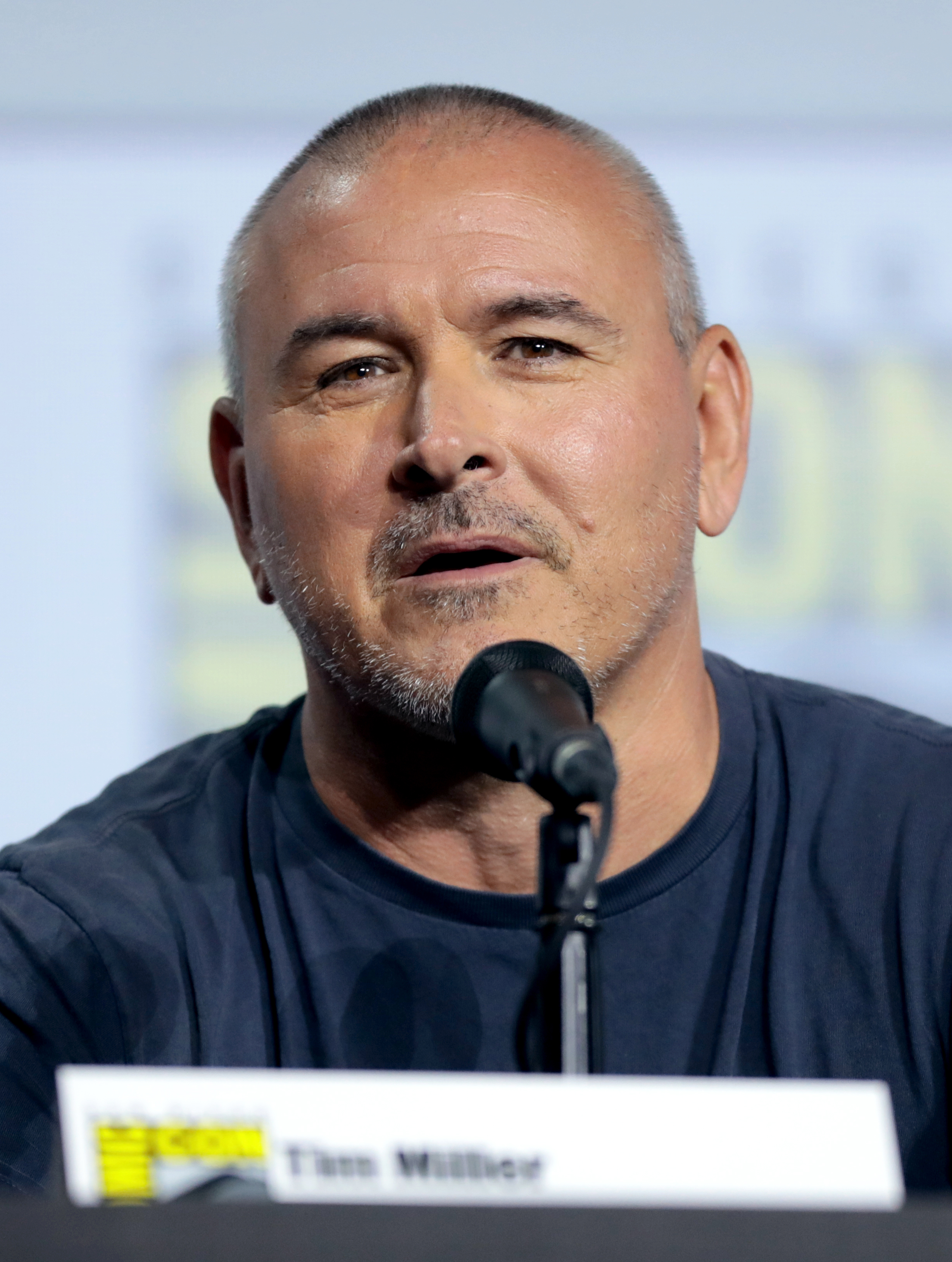
Tim Miller, the executive producer of the Sonic the Hedgehog film series

Since 2020, Paramount Pictures has distributed a series of live-action animated Sonic films. The films have been directed by Jeff Fowler, written by Patrick Casey and Josh Miller, produced by Neal H. Moritz, and executive produced by Tim Miller. Fowler and Miller were key staff at Blur Studio, which produced cutscenes for Shadow the Hedgehog and Sonic '06. Development began in 2013, when Sony Pictures Entertainment acquired the film rights. In June 2014, it announced plans to produce Sonic the Hedgehog as a joint venture with Sega's Marza Animation Planet. Paramount acquired the rights in October 2017, after Sony put the film into turnaround. However, most of the production team remained unchanged.

Sonic the Hedgehog follows Sonic (voiced by Ben Schwartz) as he journeys to San Francisco with a small-town cop (James Marsden) so he can escape Eggman (Jim Carrey) and collect his missing rings. Additional cast members include Tika Sumpter, Adam Pally, and Neal McDonough, while Colleen O'Shaughnessey reprises her voice role as Tails from the games for a mid-credits scene cameo. Sonic was initially redesigned to be more realistic, with fur, new running shoes, separate eyes and a more humanlike physique. The design triggered a backlash; it was criticized for not resembling the game design and provoked an uncanny valley-type of repulsed response from viewers. As such, the film was delayed so Sonic could be redesigned to better resemble the games. Sonic the Hedgehog was released in February 2020 to generally positive reviews from critics, who felt it exceeded the low expectations typically associated with video game-based films; Carrey's performance in particular was praised. It became the highest-grossing film based on a video game in US box office history at the time, and was the sixth-highest-grossing film of 2020. Iizuka said the success convinced Sega there was still interest in the Sonic series, created a new generation of fans and "changed the course of this franchise".

Sonic the Hedgehog 2 was announced in May 2020 and released in April 2022. It features Sonic and Tails attempting to stop Eggman, who collaborates with Knuckles to search for the Master Emerald. Schwartz, O'Shaughnessey, Marsden, Carrey, and Sumpter reprised their roles from the first film, while Idris Elba voices Knuckles. Much of the crew, including Fowler, Casey, and Josh Miller, returned. Sonic 2 incorporates more aspects of the Sonic games than the first film, including plot elements from Sonic 2 and Sonic 3 & Knuckles and the introduction of Shadow in the mid-credits scene. It received positive reviews and surpassed the first film as the highest-grossing video game film in the US. Knuckles, a spin-off streaming television series for Paramount+, was created by John Whittington and premiered in April 2024. The story is set after the events of Sonic 2 and follows Knuckles as he trains a protégé. It was produced by the films' creative team; Elba, Pally, Sumpter, Schwartz, and O'Shaughnessey reprise their roles, while Edi Patterson, Julian Barratt, Scott Mescudi, Ellie Taylor, Cary Elwes, Stockard Channing, Christopher Lloyd, Paul Scheer and Rob Huebel portray new characters.

Sonic the Hedgehog 3, released in December 2024, adapts the story of Sonic Adventure 2. Fowler directed from a script by Casey, Miller, and Whittington. Schwartz, O'Shaughnessey, Elba, Carrey, Marsden, and Sumpter reprised their roles, while Keanu Reeves voices Shadow, and Krysten Ritter, Alyla Browne, James Wolk, Sofia Pernas, Cristo Fernández, and Jorma Taccone play new characters. Sonic 3 is tied with Werewolves Within (2021) as the highest rated film adapted from a video game on Rotten Tomatoes. Paramount was developing Sonic the Hedgehog 4 at the time of Sonic the Hedgehog 3's release. It is scheduled to be released in early 2027. It will adapt elements from Sonic CD, with Kristen Bell voicing Amy.

As of January 2025, the Sonic film series has grossed over US$1 billion worldwide. Elements from the films have been incorporated in the Sonic games, including in downloadable content (DLC) for Shadow Generations which establishes that the films take place in an alternate universe from the games.

=== Merchandise ===
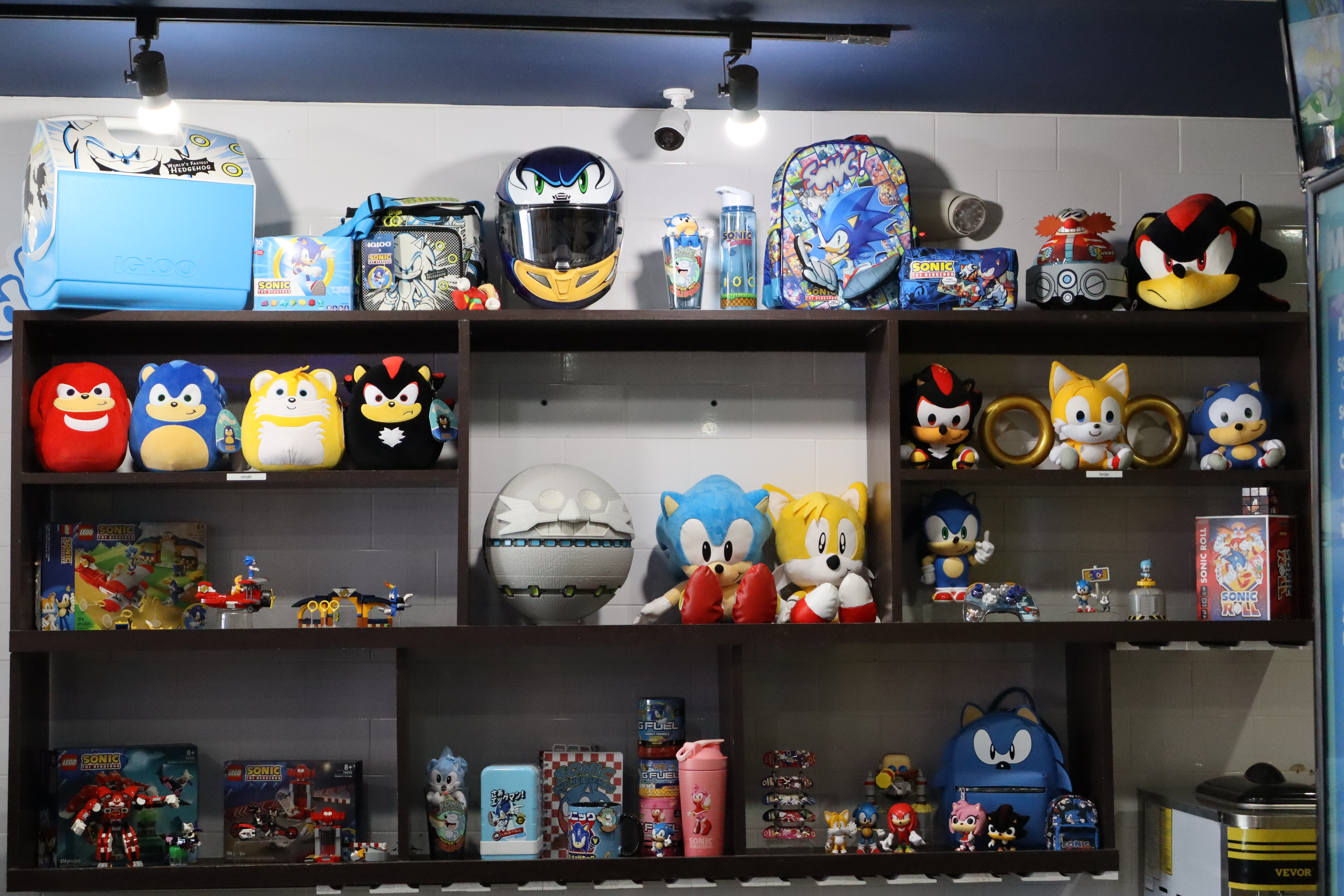
Sonic merchandise on display at Sonic the Hedgehog Speed Cafe in Katy, Texas, in 2024

Licensed Sonic merchandise includes books, clothing, soundtracks, board games, and toys such as figures and plushes. By 2004, the Sonic the Hedgehog franchise had generated more than $1 billion in licensed merchandise sales. Sega and McDonald's collaborated for Sonic-themed Happy Meal promotions in 1994 for Sonic 3 and in 2004 for Sonic Heroes. Sonic was the first video game franchise promoted in McDonald's, and over 50 million Sonic Happy Meal toys were sold worldwide. A million pairs of Sonic trousers were sold by 1996.

First4Figures has produced a large number of vinyl and resin Sonic figures since 2008. In January 2012, Sega and RHM Solutions opened an online Sonic store, while PlayStation Gear began selling Sonic items in December 2017. Sega and The Lego Group collaborated to produce a Green Hill Zone Lego set in 2021, after it was suggested on Lego Ideas in 2019. This was followed by the launch of a full Lego Sonic the Hedgehog theme in 2023. In 2025, Magic: The Gathering cards themed after Sonic were released as part of the Secret Lair series.

=== Events ===
On June 23, 2021, to celebrate Sonic the Hedgehog's 30th anniversary, Sega presented the concert Sonic the Hedgehog 30th Anniversary Symphony as a free live stream on YouTube and Twitch, starring performances of orchestral arrangements of Sonic's music by Prague Philharmonic Orchestra and pop rock arrangements by the Tomoya Ohtani Band and Crush 40, with Nathan Sharp as guest singer. The concert would become the start of Sonic Symphony, a tour, with its first live concert on October 12, 2022 at the 2022 Brasil Game Show and more concerts in late 2023, 2024, and 2025 as the Sonic Symphony World Tour. The next concert tour, Sonic Live in Concert, for Sonic's 35th anniversary, is set to premiere on September 20, 2026 in Spokane, Washington, and continue throughout 2026 and 2027 with shows in the US, UK and Canada.

=== Podcast ===
Sonic the Hedgehog Presents: The Chaotix Casefiles is an audio drama podcast co-produced by Sega of America and Realm and started on January 27, 2026. Featuring the voice actors from the games, the podcast follows Team Chaotix solving a case in the style of noir detective dramas.

== Legacy ==
=== Commentary ===
I think Sega succeeded in making a good, strong character. There are lots of games that try to imitate Mario but Sega did especially well with Sonic. Despite his resemblance to Mario, there are some special points that make him different: the energy, for example. Among Mario's imitations, Sonic is a good one.

— Mario creator Shigeru Miyamoto, 1995

The Sonic platformers released during the 1990s were acclaimed and have been listed among the greatest video games of all time. The original Sonic was touted as a faster, cooler alternative to Nintendo's Super Mario World (1990). According to Kotaku's Zolani Stewart, Sonic's rebellious character was representative of the culture of the 1990s, "when the idea of individual rebellion seemed inextricably linked to consumer culture". Writing in The Guardian, Keith Stuart observed that Sonic the Hedgehog's emphasis on speed departed from accepted precepts of game design, requiring that players "learn through repetition rather than observation" as "the levels aren't designed to be seen or even understood in one playthrough... Sonic is incorrect game design and yet ... it's a masterpiece." Sonic 2, Sonic CD, Sonic 3, and Sonic & Knuckles were praised for building on the first game's formula; in 1996, Next Generation described them as "the zeitgeist of the 16-bit era".

After the uneventful Saturn era, the series found renewed popularity during the sixth generation of video game consoles. Sonic Adventure, though criticized for its glitches and camera system, was acclaimed for its visuals, spectacle, and varied gameplay; Sonic Adventure 2 was met with similar praise. However, journalists began to feel the series was straying from its roots, with some commenting that Sonic Adventure failed to reinvent Sonic for the 3D era as Super Mario 64 had for Mario. Stewart argued that the addition of voice acting and greater focus on plot changed Sonic into "a flat, lifeless husk of a character, who spits out slogans and generally has only one personality mode, the radical attitude dude, the sad recycled image of vague '90s cultural concept". Edwin Evans-Thirlwell of Eurogamer agreed, writing that Mario's "plucky earnestness and whimsy will always enjoy a longer shelf-life than [Sonic's] over-compensatory edginess".

After the Dreamcast, the series' critical standing declined. Evans-Thirlwell summarized further 3D Sonic games as "20-odd years of slowly accumulating bullshit". Although reviews for Sonic Heroes were mostly favorable, Stewart said this was when the focus on story and cutscenes became unbearable. Shadow the Hedgehog was widely criticized as a misguided attempt to bring a sense of maturity to the franchise, and Sonic '06 was critically panned. The Sonic Mania developer Christian Whitehead said that the changes to the Sonic formula "stemmed from a – perhaps misplaced – desire to continue to push Sonic as a AAA brand". Journalists, Whitehead, and the former Sega of America marketing director Al Nilsen criticized the number of characters added to the series, which Naka had justified as necessary to please fans. Evans-Thirlwell argued that Sonic Team had never successfully translated the momentum-based gameplay of the Genesis games to 3D, and that unlike Mario, Sonic never had a 3D "transcendental hit". Simon Parkin of The Guardian noted that whereas the Mario creator Shigeru Miyamoto reviews every Mario game prior to release, the individuals who had shaped Sonic (Naka, Ohshima, and Cerny) left Sega.

Despite the critical decline, Dimps' side-scrolling Sonic games for the GBA and DS were consistently praised. Writing for Destructoid, James Stephanie Sterling said: "Hyperbole states that we haven't had a good Sonic game since Sonic Adventure, which really betrays how much we gamers ignore the handheld market... Sonic Advance and the Sonic Rush games have often ranged from decent to superb, which makes one wonder why Dimps is the 'B' team and the inferior Sonic Team is the 'A' team." In the wake of the 2006 Sonic the Hedgehog, Brett Elston of GamesRadar+ said that Sonic Rush Adventure had "managed to keep the [series'] spirit alive". Sonic Unleashed was criticized for its addition of beat 'em up gameplay, which IGN's Hilary Goldstein felt had "nothing to do with Sonic whatsoever". Critics suggested that Unleashed would have been better received if it had focused on its speed-based platforming levels, which were widely praised.

In October 2010, Sega delisted Sonic games with average or below-average scores on the review aggregator website Metacritic, to increase the value of the brand and avoid confusing customers. That month, Sonic the Hedgehog 4: Episode I was released to general praise, with Goldstein describing it as "short but sweet and well worth downloading". Sonic Colors, released shortly afterward, was hailed as a return to form, as was 2011's Sonic Generations. Though Evans-Thirlwell considered Sonic Generations the best 3D Sonic game, he called it "an admission of defeat" for depicting the 2D and 3D incarnations of Sonic "together only to remind us of their profound differences". Sonic Lost World was released in 2013 to more mixed reviews, with some critics considering it a fresh take on the Sonic formula and others a poorly designed mess. The two Sonic Boom games received negative reviews and sold only 490,000 copies combined by February 2015, making them the worst-selling Sonic games. That year, Iizuka admitted that Sonic Team had prioritized shipping games over quality and did not have enough involvement in third-party Sonic games such as Sonic Boom. The Sega CEO, Haruki Satomi, acknowledged that Sega in general had "partially betrayed" the trust of the longtime fans and hoped to focus on quality over quantity.

In June 2015, the Sonic public relations manager Aaron Webber took charge of the series' Twitter account. Under Webber, the account, @sonic_hedgehog, became renowned for posting internet memes and making self-deprecating comments about the Sonic franchise's critical decline. According to Allegra Frank of Polygon, Webber "had an important effect on the franchise, cultivating a new persona for the character, one that has created a renewed sense of hope". The announcement of Sonic Mania in 2016 brought further hope for the Sonic franchise's future. Journalists described it as a true continuation of the Genesis games, succeeding where previous Sonic games—such as Sonic Rush and Sonic 4—had failed. Released in August 2017, it became the best-reviewed Sonic game in 15 years. Matt Espineli of GameSpot said it "exceeds expectations of what a new game in the franchise can look and play like, managing to simultaneously be a charming celebration of the past and a natural progression of the series' classic 2D formula". Many called it one of the best games in the series and expressed excitement for Sonic's future, although Sonic Forces, released a few months later, received mixed reviews.

=== Sales ===
Sonic the Hedgehog is one of the bestselling video game franchises. Its cumulative sales reached 89 million copies by March 2011 and over 140 million by 2016. The Mario & Sonic series alone sold over 19 million copies as of 2011. The Sonic the Hedgehog games had grossed over $5 billion in sales by 2014. Series sales and free-to-play mobile game downloads totaled 920 million by 2019, more than 1.14 billion by 2020, over 1.6 billion by 2023, and over 1.77 billion by 2024. In 1993, Sonic tied with Mario as the highest-earning entertainment character of the year, each generating $500 million ($1,110 million adjusted for inflation) in digital game sales that year. In the United Kingdom, Sonic was the sixth-bestselling game franchise between 1996 and 2012.

Individual Sonic games have been bestsellers as well. The original game is the bestselling Genesis game, while Sonic the Hedgehog 2 is the bestselling Game Gear game, Sonic CD is the bestselling Sega CD game, and Sonic Adventure is the bestselling Dreamcast game. Sonic Adventure 2 is the eighth-bestselling GameCube game in the US and the bestselling GameCube game that was not published by Nintendo. Upon release, Sonic the Hedgehog 2 set records for being the fastest-selling game, selling out 3.2 million copies worldwide within two weeks in 1992. The original Sonic the Hedgehog earned over $400 million by 1997 ($950 million adjusted for inflation). Sonic the Hedgehog 2 grossed $450 million in 1992 ($1,030 million adjusted for inflation), becoming the year's highest-grossing home entertainment product.

Year	Game	Platform(s)	Sales
1991	Sonic the Hedgehog	Sega Genesis	15 million (bundled with Genesis hardware)
1992	Sonic the Hedgehog 2	Sega Genesis	6 million
1993	Sonic CD	Sega CD	1.5 million
1994	Sonic the Hedgehog 3 and Sonic & Knuckles	Sega Genesis	4 million
1996	Sonic 3D Blast	Sega Genesis, Sega Saturn	700,000
1998	Sonic Adventure	Dreamcast	2.5 million
2001	Sonic Adventure 2	Dreamcast	500,000
2001	Sonic Adventure 2: Battle	GameCube	1.54 million (Note: Sonic Adventure 2: Battle: 1.44 million in US, 100,000 in UK)
2001	Sonic Advance	Game Boy Advance	1.31 million (Note: Sonic Advance: 1.21 million in US, 100,000 in UK)
2002	Sonic Advance 2	Game Boy Advance	1.0163 million (Note: Sonic Advance 2: 176,541 in Japan, 740,000 in the US, and 100,000 in the UK)
2003	Sonic Mega Collection	GameCube	1.453 million (Note: Sonic Mega Collection: 1.38 million in US, 72,967 in Japan)
2003	Sonic Heroes	PlayStation 2, Xbox, GameCube	3.41 million
2003	Sonic Mega Collection Plus	PlayStation 2, Xbox	2 million
2005	Shadow the Hedgehog	PlayStation 2, Xbox, GameCube	2.06 million
2006	Sonic Riders	GameCube, PlayStation 2, Xbox, Windows	930,000 with an additional 560,000 units in North America by the end of March 2007.
2006	Sonic the Hedgehog	Mobile	8 million in US & EU
2006	Sonic the Hedgehog (2006)	Xbox 360, PlayStation 3	870,000
2007	Sonic and the Secret Rings	Wii	1.2 million
2008	Sonic Unleashed	PlayStation 2, Wii, Xbox 360, PlayStation 3	2.45 million
2010	Sonic & Sega All-Stars Racing	PlayStation 3, Xbox 360, Wii, Nintendo DS, Windows	1.07 million
2010	Sonic Colors	Wii, Nintendo DS	2.18 million
2011	Sonic Generations	PlayStation 3, Xbox 360, Windows, Nintendo 3DS	1.85 million
2012	Sonic & All-Stars Racing Transformed	PlayStation 3, Xbox 360, Wii U, Nintendo 3DS	1.36 million
2013	Sonic Lost World	Wii U, Nintendo 3DS	710,000
2014	Sonic Boom: Rise of Lyric and Shattered Crystal	Wii U, Nintendo 3DS	620,000
2017	Sonic Mania	Nintendo Switch, PlayStation 4, Xbox One, Windows, Nintendo Switch 2	1 million
2019	Team Sonic Racing	Nintendo Switch, PlayStation 4, Xbox One, Windows, Nintendo Switch 2	3.5 million
2022	Sonic Frontiers	Nintendo Switch, PlayStation 4, PlayStation 5, Xbox One, Xbox Series X/S, Windows, Nintendo Switch 2	5 million
2023	Sonic Superstars	Nintendo Switch, PlayStation 4, PlayStation 5, Xbox One, Xbox Series X/S, Windows, Nintendo Switch 2	2.43 million
2024	Sonic X Shadow Generations	Nintendo Switch, Nintendo Switch 2, PlayStation 5, Xbox Series X/S, Windows, Nintendo Switch 2	2 million
2025	Sonic Racing: CrossWorlds	Nintendo Switch, Nintendo Switch 2, PlayStation 4, PlayStation 5, Windows, Xbox One, Xbox Series X/S	1 million
Mario & Sonic series			19 million
2007	Mario & Sonic at the Olympic Games	Wii, Nintendo DS	11.31 million
2009	Mario & Sonic at the Olympic Winter Games	Wii, Nintendo DS	6.53 million
2011	Mario & Sonic at the London 2012 Olympic Games	Wii, Nintendo 3DS	3.28 million
2019	Mario & Sonic at the Olympic Games Tokyo 2020	Nintendo Switch	900,000

=== Effect on the industry ===
Primarily because of its Genesis bundling, Sonic the Hedgehog contributed greatly to the console's popularity in North America. Between October and December 1991, the Genesis outsold its chief competitor, the Super Nintendo Entertainment System, by a two-to-one ratio; at its January 1992 peak Sega held 65 percent of the market for 16-bit consoles. Although Nintendo eventually reclaimed the number-one position, it was the first time since December 1985 that Nintendo had not led the console market. 1UP.com credited Sonic for "turning the course" of the 16-bit console wars, helping make Sega a dominant player and industry giant.

During the 16-bit era, Sonic inspired similar platformers starring animal mascots, including the Bubsy series, Aero the Acro-Bat (1993), James Pond 3 (1993), Earthworm Jim (1994), and Zero the Kamikaze Squirrel (1994). "Animal with attitude" games carried over to the 3D era, with the developers of Gex (1995) and Crash Bandicoot (1996) citing Sonic as a major inspiration. According to Levi Buchanan of IGN, "Sonic inspired so many of these copycats that they practically became an entire subgenre for the platformer." Thorpe wrote that "it's hard to keep track of how many programmers have cited [Sonic the Hedgehog] as a bar against which they have measured their own work", while Phil Hornshaw of Complex noted that few animal mascot characters achieved the same success as Sonic. Regarding the series' influence, Thorpe wrote:

Every E3 conference dig can be traced back to the console war that truly fired up when Sonic and Mario were put side by side. Every time console games have pushed to obtain an older target age group, that's something that Sonic was on the leading edge of – and broadening demographics has been important to the growth of the games industry, whether for reasons of content... or appeal... Five years prior to the co-ordinated international launch of Sonic 2, your gaming experience depended heavily on where you lived... These days, with same-day global launches and region-free consoles, that seems like a lifetime ago. And of course, every time you buy DLC, you might want to spare a thought for Sonic & Knuckles. And, of course, all of that is to say nothing of the legion of mascot platform games that came in the wake of the Sonic series.

Computer and Video Games credited Sonic the Hedgehog with helping to popularize console video games in the United Kingdom, where home computers previously dominated the home video game market. Frank Cifaldi, a video game preservationist and the founder of the Video Game History Foundation (VGHF), said Sonic fans' documentation of Sonic the Hedgehog 2 prototypes influenced how video game history is studied, and that the VGHF has roots in his interest in Sonic 2's development.

=== Cultural impact ===
Sonic was the first video game character to have a balloon in the Macy's Thanksgiving Day Parade, which occurred in 1993. In the above time lapse of the 2012 parade, the balloon can be seen at the 46-second mark.

One of the world's most popular video game characters, by 1992 Sonic was more recognizable to children ages 6 to 11 than Disney's Mickey Mouse. In 1993, Sonic became the first video game character to have a balloon in the Macy's Thanksgiving Day Parade, and he was one of the four characters inducted on the Walk of Game in 2005, alongside Mario, Link, and Master Chief. Additionally, a Japanese team developing the Radio & Plasma Wave Investigation (RPWI) instrumentation for the Jupiter Icy Moons Explorer spacecraft, to be launched by ESA and Airbus in 2023, received approval to use Sonic as the mascot. Sonic and Eggman appear as minor characters in the Walt Disney Animation Studios films Wreck-It Ralph (2012) and Ralph Breaks the Internet (2018), while Sonic makes cameos in Ready Player One (2018) and Chip 'n Dale: Rescue Rangers (2022).

The franchise is known for its eccentric and passionate fandom, which produces unofficial media, including fangames, fan fiction, modifications and ROM hacks of existing games, fan films, and fan art. Caty McCarthy of USGamer noted that many fans have continued to support the series in spite of poorly received games like the 2006 Sonic the Hedgehog, and she credited the fandom with helping maintain public interest in the franchise. Notable Sonic fangames include Sonic After the Sequel (2013), set between the events of Sonic the Hedgehog 2 and 3, and Sonic Dreams Collection (2015), which satirizes the series' fandom. Sonic Mania's development team included individuals who had worked on Sonic ROM hacks and fangames, while Iizuka said the character customization system in Sonic Forces was influenced by the Sonic community's tendency to create original characters. Summer of Sonic, an annual fan convention dedicated to the Sonic series and hosted in the United Kingdom, was founded by Svend Joscelyne and Adam Tuff and first held in 2008.

Sonic has inspired various internet memes, which have been acknowledged by Sega and referenced in games. "Sanic hegehog", a crude Sonic drawn in Microsoft Paint, originated in 2010; typically, the meme uses one of Sonic's catchphrases but with poor grammar. The Sonic Twitter account has made numerous references to it, and it appeared in official downloadable content for Sonic Forces on in-game shirts and as a visual gag in the Sonic the Hedgehog film. Sanic also inspired similar memes and parodies and was described by William Moo of Syfy Wire as "perfect proof of the twisted love and appreciation many have" for Sonic. In January 2018, players flooded the virtual reality game VRChat with avatars depicting "Ugandan Knuckles", a deformed version of Knuckles the Echidna. The character stemmed from a 2017 review of Sonic Lost World by YouTube user Gregzilla, as well as fans of PlayerUnknown's Battlegrounds streamer Forsen, who often reference the African country Uganda. The Ugandan Knuckles meme was controversial for its perceived racial insensitivity, and the creator of the avatar expressed regret over how it was used. In response, the Sonic Twitter account encouraged players to respect others and donate to a Ugandan charity through GlobalGiving.

The sonic hedgehog gene, first identified for its role in fruit fly embryonic development, was named after Sonic. Robert Riddle, then a postdoctoral fellow at the Tabin Lab, came up with the name after his wife bought a magazine containing an advert for Sonic. A mutation in the gene causes fly larvae to bear spiky denticles, reminiscent of Sonic.
