= Sega Superstars Tennis =

2008 sports video game

- Universal artwork
- Developers: Sumo Digital; Feral Interactive (OS X)
- Publishers: Sega; Feral Interactive (OS X)
- Producers: Mark Glossop; Steve Lycatt; Toby Allen
- Designer: Travis Ryan
- Composer: Richard Jacques
- Series: Sega All-Stars
- Platforms: Xbox 360, PlayStation 2, PlayStation 3, Wii, Nintendo DS, Mac OS X
- Release: NA: March 18, 2008; EU: March 20, 2008; AU: March 27, 2008; Mac OS X: WW: October 17, 2013
- Genre: Sports game
- Modes: Single-player, multiplayer

Sega Superstars Tennis is a sports video game developed by Sumo Digital and published by Sega. It is the second title in the Sega All-Stars series, preceded by Sega Superstars (2004), and crosses over characters, locations, and soundtracks from several Sega franchises, including Sonic the Hedgehog, Space Channel 5, and Super Monkey Ball. It is the first and only Sega-themed tennis game to represent multiple franchises, and is the first game to feature Alex Kidd (Sega's former mascot) since the release of Alex Kidd in Shinobi World (1990).

After having worked on Virtua Tennis 3, Sumo Digital expressed interest in making a Sega-themed tennis game. Sega Superstars Tennis was officially announced in October 2007 by Sega, and released on 18 March 2008 in North America. It was originally released for PlayStation 3, Xbox 360, PlayStation 2, and Wii, followed by releases for Mac OS X and multiple mobile versions. Upon release, Sega Superstars Tennis received mixed reviews from critics, with reviewers praising the game's Sega-theming and variety of content but criticizing the core gameplay, albeit enjoyable. The game was also praised for including well-received and unique characters, including Ulala from Space Channel 5, and Gum and Beat from Jet Set Radio. The game was later bundled with Xbox 360 consoles in December 2008, alongside the Xbox Live Arcade game compilation. By July 2013, the game had sold more than 5.36 million standalone copies across all platforms, earning it a Guinness World Record for the "Best-Selling Tennis Video Game" of all-time.

The game was followed up by two racing game entries, Sonic & Sega All-Stars Racing (2010) and Sonic & All-Stars Racing Transformed (2012). It was one of the last tennis games developed by Sumo Digital, alongside Virtua Tennis 2009.

== Gameplay ==
An example of multiplayer gameplay during one of the minigames

The gameplay in Sega Superstars Tennis is similar to Sega's Virtua Tennis series, with characters able to perform techniques such as lob shots and drop shots. Characters each have different statistics and proficiency in specific areas, such as power or control. Each character also has their own unique "Superstar State", a special ability that can be activated once an accompanying meter is filled. The effects of a Superstar State vary depending on the character; for example, Sonic transforms to Super Sonic and causes the ball to zig-zag when hit, while Gilius summons thunderbolts that can temporarily stun opponents. The game features ten courts themed after various Sega games, such as Green Hill Zone from Sonic the Hedgehog and Shibuya Downtown from Jet Set Radio.

Sega Superstars Tennis features several gameplay modes. Superstars mode allows the player to complete various missions themed around a specific Sega games, which take the form of exhibition matches, tournaments and minigame score challenges; completing these missions will unlock new areas based on other games with additional sets of missions to complete. Players will unlock new additional characters, courts, and music for use in gameplay as they progress through Superstars. Match mode offers standard tennis gameplay in singles or doubles matches for up to four players locally, while Tournament mode allows a single player to compete in a series of five sequential matches against random computer opponents. There are also several playable minigames that feature alternate gameplay styles inspired by other Sega games, including Space Harrier, The House of the Dead, Puyo Pop Fever, ChuChu Rocket!, and Virtua Cop. The PlayStation 3 and Xbox 360 versions also support online multiplayer.

The Wii version features support for three different control schemes: the Wii Remote with Nunchuk, the Wii Remote sideways, and the Classic Controller. The Nintendo DS version of the game can be played with the standard control pad or the touch screen.

=== Locations, courts, and characters ===
Sega Superstars Tennis features representation from several of Sega's intellectual properties. A total of 16 playable characters represented come from the following franchises: Super Monkey Ball, Sonic the Hedgehog, Jet Set Radio, Space Channel 5, NiGHTS, Alex Kidd, Samba de Amigo, and Golden Axe. Tennis courts also feature themes from other Sega video games, including The House of the Dead and OutRun, and include specific locations such as Green Hill Zone from Sonic the Hedgehog, Spaceport 9 from Space Channel 5, and Shibuya Downtown from Jet Set Radio.

==== Playable characters ====
Sega Superstars Tennis features 16 playable characters originating from eight different Sega franchises. Eight characters are available from the start, while the remaining eight must be unlocked through Superstars mode. The game marks the first 3D appearances of both Alex Kidd and Gilius Thunderhead (Golden Axe) in a video game, and marks Alex Kidd's first playable appearance in eighteen years following the 1990 release of Alex Kidd in Shinobi World.

- AiAi
- Alex Kidd
- Amigo
- Amy
- Beat
- Dr. Eggman
- Gilius
- Gum
- MeeMee
- NiGHTS
- Pudding
- Reala
- Shadow
- Sonic
- Tails
- Ulala

== Soundtrack ==
The game's primary composer is Richard Jacques, who also did work for other Sega titles, including Sonic 3D Blast (1996), Sonic R (1997), Jet Set Radio (2000), Jet Set Radio Future (2002), and OutRun 2 (2003). While he composed songs for the title, such as the remastered Space Harrier theme and the ChuChu Rocket! soundtrack for the minigames, music Jacques already composed for Jet Set Radio, Jet Set Radio Future, OutRun, OutRun 2, and OutRun 2006: Coast 2 Coast make appearances in the games.

The game consists of a variety of music, all of which originate from specific Sega video games. Music by Hideki Naganuma is also featured in Sega Superstars Tennis, with his work initially originating from Jet Set Radio and Jet Set Radio Future. Some songs, such as "Let Mom Sleep" and "Fly Like a Butterfly," make appearances as unlockable soundtracks in the game. The Space Channel 5 (1999) soundtrack, originally composed by Naofumi Hataya and Kenichi Tokoi, also appear in Sega Superstars Tennis. In addition, the soundtracks for Sonic the Hedgehog (1991), Sonic Adventure 2 (2001), and Sonic Heroes (2003) also appear as part of the Sonic the Hedgehog-themed tennis courts. Tetsuya Kawauchi's work for The House of the Dead (1997) is also featured in Sega Superstars Tennis. Original music scores from Super Monkey Ball: Banana Blitz (2006), Puyo Pop Fever (2003), and Samba de Amigo (1999) are also present in the game.

For the Samba de Amigo-themed tennis court, the song "El Ritmo Tropical", performed by Dixie's Gang, makes an appearance as an unlockable soundtrack in Sega Superstars Tennis. The song originally appeared in Samba de Amigo (1999), however, was performed by Claude Ganem instead.

== Licensing issue ==
In Sega Superstars Tennis, the game The House of the Dead is prominently featured as a tennis court and minigame, however, the franchise is renamed Curien Mansion. In 1997, the original The House of the Dead video game, and later the franchise as a whole, was banned in Germany due to high levels of violence and gore. To have a worldwide release of the game, Steve Lycett, the Executive Producer of Sega Superstars Tennis, renamed the franchise "Curien Mansion" in order to sell the game across all European territories. The title Curien Mansion and updated logo are reused in place of The House of the Dead in other Sega crossovers by Sumo Digital, including Sonic & Sega All-Stars Racing (2010) and Sonic & All-Stars Racing Transformed (2012).

Similarly to The House of the Dead, Virtua Cop is also banned in Germany, and was renamed "Virtua Squad" for Sega Superstars Tennis, although the game is referred to as such in certain European countries.

== Release ==
Sega Superstars Tennis was announced by Sega in October 2007. In an early preview for the game, Anthony Dickens for Nintendo Life described the trailer of the game as "Wii Sports meets Virtua Tennis meets Sonic." Sega Superstars Tennis was released in North America, Australia, and Europe in March 2008 for the Xbox 360, Nintendo DS, Wii, PlayStation 2, and PlayStation 3. The game would later be ported to the Mac OS X by Feral Interactive in October 2013.

== Reception ==
Reception

Aggregate score
Aggregator	Score
Metacritic	X360: 67/100; PS2: 70/100; PS3: 67/100; Wii: 71/100; DS: 65/100

Review scores
Publication	Score
Destructoid	X360: 7/10
Edge	X360: 7/10
Eurogamer	X360: 7/10
Game Informer	X360: 7.25/10; Wii: 7.5/10; PS3: 7.25/10
GamePro	PS3: 3/5; DS: 2.25/5
GameRevolution	X360: D PS3: D DS: C−
GameSpot	X360: 7/10; Wii: 7/10; PS2: 7/10; PS3: 7/10; DS: 6.5/10
GameSpy	X360: 3/5
GameTrailers	X360: 6.5/10
GameZone	X360: 6.9/10; PS3: 5.5/10; DS: 6.6/10
IGN	X360: 6.4/10; PS2: 6.4/10; PS3 (US): 6.4/10; PS3 (AU): 6/10; Wii: 6.2/10; DS: 6.9/10
Nintendo Life	Wii: 8/10
Nintendo Power	Wii: 8/10; DS: 8/10
Official Xbox Magazine (US)	X360: 6/10
PlayStation: The Official Magazine	PS2: 4/5

Sega Superstars Tennis received "mixed or average reviews" on all platforms according to the review aggregation website Metacritic. It received a mixed reaction for its repetitive gameplay and overwhelming challenges, while receiving praise for its representation of Sega's heritage, minigames, and multiplayer functionality.

The minigames in Sega Superstars Tennis were praised for their uniqueness and creativity. Neal Ronaghan for Nintendo World Report praised the minigames as a whole, citing them as creative, and applauding the Space Harrier and The House of the Dead minigames in particular. However, Ronaghan criticized the Sonic the Hedgehog minigame, calling it the "dud" of the bunch. James Newton for Nintendo Life also applauded the minigames as a whole, mentioning The House of the Dead as the minigame highlight. Furthermore, Newton also added that "Some [of the minigames] can become repetitive after time, as you might play several 'collect the rings' games on the same court just to progress, but the majority of games work well, and will certainly bring a smile to Sega fans’ faces, which we all know can be difficult. The highlights are the games that replace bullets with balls, although the puzzle-based games are extremely addictive too."

The game's character roster was also unanimously praised for its diversity and representation of well-received Sega characters and their unique abilities. The additions of Ulala, AiAi, NiGHTS, Gum, and Shadow are often noted as some of Sega Superstars Tennis' more fan-appealed characters, and received commendation for their additions to the sports title. Eurogamer praised the Xbox 360 version for its fan service, specifically for its tennis courts and characters. Ryan Geddes for IGN commented on the overall character selection, citing it as one of the game's highlights, further praising the character's special abilities as amusing but rather useless, writing: "One of Superstars' calling cards is its Superstar State function, which, when activated, allows the characters to turn into even zanier versions of themselves (Sonic becomes a super-fast Super Sonic, for example). Practically, though, most Superstar powers are fairly useless against AI players, and the ones that do actual damage to your opponent are extremely annoying to play against in one-on-one matches." Matt Casamassina, also for IGN, also praised the "colorful" characters and mascots in the Wii version of the game.

Though it was praised for its multiplayer and enjoyable gameplay, the Wii version of the game was criticized for its lack of graphical detail and online support. Official Nintendo Magazine reviewed the Wii version, saying that it had great gameplay and fun minigames and was enjoyable in multiplayer. However, the game just missed out on a Gold Award (which is given to games that score 90% or higher in their reviews) due to the lack to Nintendo Wi-Fi support and blasted Sega for the omission due to Wi-Fi being supported on the Xbox and PS3, commenting that as Nintendo Wi-Fi had already proven its capabilities with other games, it appeared that Sega simply couldn't be bothered to include it. IGN called the Wii version "a tennis game that should have been better than it is." They criticized the lack of detail in the graphics, the muffled sound effects, simplistic gameplay, and the lack of an online mode, which is present in the PlayStation 3 and Xbox 360 versions.

=== Accolades ===
In July of 2013, Sega Superstars Tennis was recognized by the Guinness World Records for being the best-selling standalone tennis game of all-time, across all platforms. According to the certificate, the game had sold over 5.36 million copies worldwide at the time, and currently holds the title as of March 2026.

== See also ==
- Virtua Tennis
- List of games featuring Sonic the Hedgehog
