= Nights (character) =

Video game character created by Sega

NiGHTS
- NiGHTS character
- A render of Nights' character model based on the design for Nights: Journey of Dreams.
- First appearance: Nights into Dreams (1996)
- Created by: Naoto Ohshima
- Voiced by: English Elara Distler (Sonic Shuffle); Japanese Ikue Ōtani (Sonic Shuffle)

Nights (stylized as NiGHTS) is a character created by Japanese game designer Naoto Ohshima for Sega. The character first appeared in the 1996 Sega Saturn game Nights into Dreams, developed by Sonic Team, and later returned in the 2007 Wii sequel Nights: Journey of Dreams. Nights is an androgynous, jester-like being from the dream world of Nightopia who rebels against Wizeman, the ruler of Nightmare, and combines with human dreamers to allow them to fly through their dreams.

Ohshima was inspired by Peter Pan when designing a character able to perform actions that humans could experience only in dreams. The character's gender was deliberately left ambiguous, while flight and acrobatic movement became central to both the character's identity and the design of Nights into Dreams. Beyond Nights into Dreams and Journey of Dreams, Nights has appeared in numerous crossover titles developed and published by Sega.

Contemporary games media treated Nights as a mascot, while later critics examined why the character was more difficult to market than Sonic the Hedgehog. The character's androgyny, bodily transformations, and ability to fly has been discussed and interpreted within the context of gender representation and queer reading techniques. Nights has continued to appear in other video games published by Sega years after the original release of Nights into Dreams.

== Concept and creation ==
Following Sonic & Knuckles, Sonic Team decided to develop a new setting and protagonist rather than build its next game around Sonic. Producer Yuji Naka said the team wanted to create a character that departed from conventions then common in Japanese games rather than merely designing one calculated to be agreeable to a wide audience. Ohshima researched European and North American culture while developing Nights, and the designers sought a visual identity that could be understood internationally. Ohshima settled on a figure with gestures he associated with an angel, while Naka considered the character's elegant appearance suitable for audiences outside Japan.

Ohshima later said that the original inspiration was to create a character resembling Peter Pan. He associated both Peter Pan and Nights with performing feats that ordinary people could experience only in dreams. This led him to envision Nights into Dreams as effectively containing two forms of play: as a vulnerable human, the player could move freely through a comparatively small three-dimensional space, while combining with Nights gave the player extraordinary abilities but placed movement along more structured aerial routes. Ohshima said this distinction was intended partly to accommodate players who were still unfamiliar with unrestricted movement in three-dimensional games.

Ohshima contrasted Nights with Sonic, whom he had designed with what he regarded as an American sensibility, and said that the original Nights was developed chiefly with Japanese and European audiences in mind. He described Nights' gender as deliberately ambiguous, allowing the same character to be combined with both of the game's human protagonists. The development team initially considered depicting Nights as a two-dimensional sprite because of concerns that early polygonal models would not convey the personality of hand-drawn characters. The character was ultimately developed in three dimensions, with its curved aerial movement being refined alongside the game's flight system and the Saturn's analogue controller.

During development of Nights into Dreams, focus testing in the United States indicated that the Nights character appealed to a younger audience than Sega of America wanted to target. The North American packaging consequently used darker nighttime imagery to give the game a more mature appearance, and Sega considered more substantial changes intended to appeal to older Saturn owners before abandoning them.

When Sonic Team developed Journey of Dreams, designer Takashi Iizuka retained flight as the defining concept behind Nights. The sequel added transformations based on a dolphin, dragon, and rocket, while preserving the guided flight structure of the original after tests with unrestricted three-dimensional flight proved less enjoyable. Iizuka said he hoped the sequel could broaden recognition of Nights enough for the character eventually to become a gaming icon comparable to Sonic. A retrospective feature by Nintendo Power noted the character's visual changes between the two games, including the addition of an ornate circus-inspired vest and ruffled collar for the Wii design, as well as the Persona masks used to transform Nights into different forms.

== Appearances ==
In Nights into Dreams, teenagers Claris Sinclair and Elliot Edwards enter the dream world of Nightopia after experiencing setbacks in their waking lives. There they encounter Nights, a Nightmaren created by Wizeman who has rebelled against him. By combining with Nights, each child gains the ability to fly through Nightopia and ultimately joins the character in confronting Wizeman. Nights also encounters a rival named Reala, another Nightmaren created by Wizeman who remains loyal to their creator after Nights rebels. Nights also appears in Christmas NiGHTS into Dreams, a shorter seasonal release whose presentation changes according to the Saturn's internal calendar.

Nights returned as the central dream-world character in Nights: Journey of Dreams for the Wii in 2007. The sequel pairs Nights with two new children, Will Taylor and Helen Cartwright, who combine with the character while traveling through their dreams. Nights was given a larger speaking role and additional transformation abilities.

Nights has appeared in numerous Sega crossover games. The character appeared in Sega Superstars, Sonic Riders, Sonic Riders: Zero Gravity, and Sega Superstars Tennis among other titles. When Nights was initially omitted from the 2012 video game Sonic & Sega All-Stars Racing, a fan campaign led developer Sumo Digital to integrate the character into the game as a traffic guard. Nights is a playable racer in Sonic & All-Stars Racing Transformed, and Sonic Racing: CrossWorlds.

== Reception and analysis ==
Video games journalists have identified Nights with the mascot tradition associated with console games of the period. In its awards for 1996, Electronic Gaming Monthly placed Nights second to Mario in the category for "coolest mascot". In 2011, Nintendo Power devoted its recurring "Star Power" character feature to Nights in a two-page retrospective, which presented Nights' appearances from the 1996 debut through the Wii sequel and Sega crossovers as a "career", while separately examining the character's visual design, abilities, transformations and relationship with Reala. It also noted by the feature that, while magazine staff themselves used male pronouns for convenience, Sega regarded Nights as technically genderless.

Kurt Kalata of Hardcore Gaming 101 contrasted Sonic's speed and attitude, which he regarded as reflecting contemporary adolescent ideas of what was fashionable, with Nights' androgynous, purple jester design. Besides the fact that Nights is noticeably different from Sonic in many respects, Kalata considered the character to be poorly matched to what he described as the predominantly post-adolescent male game audience of the period, and identified Nights' marketability as one of several reasons Nights into Dreams did not affect the Saturn to the degree Sonic had with the Sega Genesis. Justin Towell of GamesRadar+ later placed Nights within a broader decline of video game mascots which were once prevalent within the industry in the decades prior. Looking back at 1996, he described Nights as one of the flagship hero characters associated with the three major console manufacturers despite being an unconventional flying jester. Towell argued that rising development costs made publishers less willing to back a fixed protagonist whose appearance might alienate potential customers, and used Nights as an example of a character unlikely to receive equivalent support in later big-budget development.

Media scholar Henry Jenkins examined Nights in the 1998 MIT Press collection From Barbie to Mortal Kombat: Gender and Computer Games. Jenkins treated Nights into Dreams as combining conventions he associated with games marketed separately to boys and girls, describing Nights as an androgynous harlequin whose identity could be assumed by both Claris and Elliot. He interpreted the contrast between the children's grounded human forms and Nights' flight as a fantasy of escaping gendered constraint: losing the Nights form returns the player to Claris or Elliot, confined both to the ground and to a single gender.

Evelyn Ramiel revisited Nights in a 2025 essay for the MediaCommons project In Media Res. Ramiel focused on the children dissolving into Nights rather than traveling beside the character, and on the unusually large number of expressive animations that are unnecessary for completing the game's mechanical objectives. She also examined changes to Nights' body within different environments, including developing a dolphin-like tail underwater, becoming rounded and elastic in the Soft Museum stage, and changing size. Ramiel uses queering to interpret this bodily mutability and the game's animation, particularly through Elliot's disappearance into a genderless form whose physical limitations are no longer fixed.

== Legacy ==
The character's later appearances have sometimes resulted directly from continued fan interest. Sumo Digital made the decision to include Nights in Sonic & Sega All-Stars Racing after fans campaigned against the character's omission, with the developer attributing the change to the level of support shown for Nights. Sega continued to feature the character in crossover titles in the decades after the first game's release. Coverage of Nights' addition to Sonic Racing: CrossWorlds in 2025 noted that the character retained the floating movement and dance-like poses associated with the earlier games while being adapted to the racing format.
