= Billy Hatcher and the Giant Egg =

2003 video game

- European GameCube cover art
- Developer: Sonic Team
- Publisher: Sega
- Director: Shun Nakamura
- Producer: Yuji Naka
- Designers: Shun Nakamura; Atsushi Kanno; Mizuki Hosoyamada
- Programmer: Yoshitaka Kawabata
- Artist: Hideaki Moriya
- Composers: Mariko Nanba; Tomoya Ohtani
- Platforms: GameCube, Windows
- Release: GameCube: NA: September 23, 2003; JP: October 9, 2003; PAL: October 31, 2003; Windows: EU: March 31, 2006
- Genre: Platform
- Modes: Single-player, multiplayer

Billy Hatcher and the Giant Egg (Note: Japanese: ジャイアントエッグ～ビリー・ハッチャーの大冒険～, Hepburn: Jaianto Eggu: Birī Hatchā no Daibōken; lit. "Giant Egg: The Great Adventure of Billy Hatcher") is a platform game developed by Sonic Team and published by Sega for the GameCube in 2003. A port for Microsoft Windows was released in Europe in 2006 by Mindscape. The game received mixed reviews.

== Gameplay ==
Billy Hatcher is a 3D platform game whose gameplay revolves around growing and hatching eggs to defeat the Crows. The player controls Billy, who cannot do much by himself aside from moving and jumping, but his abilities greatly expand while holding an egg. While rolling an egg, Billy moves faster and is more agile. He can also perform several techniques with an egg, such as egg dunking, slamming, dashing, and shooting.

=== Eggs ===
The game features 72 different eggs to hatch, most with unique designs. As Billy rolls over fruit collected from the world or dropped from enemies while holding an egg, the egg will grow in size and power. When the egg's gauge completely fills, the egg reaches a maximum size and flashes, indicating it is ready to hatch. Billy can perform a rooster call to hatch fully matured eggs, which can hold contents such as helper animals, hats, and items. Certain eggs are required to hatch to progress through the game, as they are necessary to clear objectives or get past obstacles.

Eggs can be damaged by enemies, large enough eggs, and the environment. An egg's damage is represented by cracks appearing on the egg's meter in the corner of the screen. When the egg takes enough damage, it is destroyed and nothing hatches from it. Eggs can also be 'lost', i.e. put into positions or situations that the player cannot retrieve them from. In such cases, the egg will disappear from its position after several seconds of inactivity and will appear back at its nest at its smallest size. Eggs with a Sonic Team logo on them can be found and hatched in certain levels after collecting enough chick coins, holding animal friends of Sonic Team characters such as Sonic the Hedgehog or NiGHTS.

Eggs will grow at a faster rate depending on the size of the fruit collected. Some eggs are easier to hatch than others, and require less fruit than others. Eggs that contain items usually hatch faster than animals, with the exception of eggs which contain Game Boy Advance minigame download titles.

=== Levels ===
The campaign is divided into seven different zones, with each zone representing one region of Morning Land and featuring 8 missions. Every mission completed awards an 'Emblem of Courage', crucial to obtaining the Legendary Chicken Suit that Billy needs for the last battle against the story's final boss, Dark Raven. For every zone except the last, the first mission takes place at night, involving Billy reaching the golden egg that imprisons the region's Chicken Elder and freeing them by hatching them out of it like any other egg; destruction of this egg results in failure of the mission. All other missions take place at daytime, with some exceptions, and share another map distinct from the first mission's map, with varying objectives. The second mission is about reaching the "dark gate" to battle the region's boss to prevent the Crows from forcing eternal night onto such region of Morning Land ever again and unlock the next zone in sequence, although to unlock the final zone, Giant Palace, the player must complete its prior zone's third mission in addition to the second one, which involves opening the Rainbow Gate to the said zone, where the final boss is immediately fought following the completion of its first mission there; the remaining 7 missions there are optional since the main storyline has already been resolved with the defeat of the final boss.

The first five missions in a zone are playable only by Billy and the remaining three missions in the same zone can only be played by his friends as they are rescued; the sixth mission of a zone requires Rolly Roll to be rescued, the seventh mission of a zone requires Chick Poacher to be rescued and the eighth and last mission of a zone requires Bantam Scrambled to be rescued.

The player is graded on their skill in completing the mission and given a rank letter, with an S Rank being the highest. While the Sonic the Hedgehog games use speed as a major factor in determining letter grading for completed stages, speed is less of a factor in mission grading for Billy Hatcher, which also takes into account combat performance, including longest attack combos performed with the same egg.

=== Game Boy Advance connectivity ===
Billy Hatcher supports linking between the GameCube and Game Boy Advance system. Using the GameCube – Game Boy Advance link cable, players can load games such as Puyo Pop, ChuChu Rocket!, and Nights: Time Attack on their Game Boy Advance systems after certain objectives are completed within the game.

== Plot ==
The story begins within a peaceful fantasy world by the name of "Morning Land", where the Chicken inhabitants live in peace and harmony. This world is shattered as Dark Raven and his army of Crows assault Morning Land, catching the inhabitants by surprise and shrouding Morning Land in a blanket of unnatural, eternal night.

Meanwhile, being late to meet with his friends due to oversleeping, the slightly mischievous Billy Hatcher races out of his house to go meet them. Upon arrival, Bantam tells Billy he is late, showing him a pocket watch in the shape of an egg. His friends, Bantam Scrambled, Chick Poacher, and Rolly Roll prepare to dish out a consequence on Billy, but they are stopped by the weak chirping of a chick. Two Crows that are looming nearby dive at the chick, as if they are finishing it off, but Billy intervenes, saving the baby chicken by fending the Crows off with a stick. The chick suddenly begins to glow, transporting Billy and his friends to Morning Land, with Billy ending up in Forest Village.

Billy is informed by Menie-Funie that the Crows are trying to take over Morning Land and will soon take over the human world. He is informed that if he does not save Morning Land, Dark Raven will bring eternal night, darkness will overcome the hearts of everyone, and the two worlds will be ruled by evil. Billy then goes and receives the Legendary Chicken Suit to begin on a journey to free the six Chicken Elders, which have been imprisoned in golden eggs by the Crows. Uri-Uri, the Chicken Elder of Pirates Island, reveals that Dark Raven is reborn every 100 years to try to bring eternal night. Once he has freed the Elders, defeated the six Crow Bosses, and opened the Rainbow Gate, Billy travels to the Giant Palace, where Dark Raven is trying to hatch the Giant Egg to receive ultimate power.

Billy battles Dark Raven, and once he defeats him, the Giant Egg hatches and grants Raven's wishes, shaping him into a crow-shaped shadow demon dubbed Ultimate Raven. A second battle then ensues. Ultimate Raven attacks Billy, destroying the Chicken Suit. Afterwards, Billy must avoid his attacks until Menie-Funie speaks to him, telling him that he must not give up. Then the Courage Emblems he has collected form into the new and enhanced Sun Suit, imbued with the power of courage. Billy must then use this power to turn Ultimate Raven's attacks against him.

Billy finally defeats Ultimate Raven as his heart explodes, completely ending his existence and return. The power from the Giant Egg restores true morning to the land below. Once he and his friends return to where they entered Morning Land, they return the Chicken Suits and return to their world. It seems that when they are leaving, Billy is saddened that he has to leave Morning Land. The four friends wave goodbye and they are transported back. Upon their return to the human world, Billy is a short distance away from his friends. They get his attention by laughing at him and he runs over to them joining the laughter, thus ending the game with a chicken feather slowly falling from the sky.

== Development ==
Producer Yuji Naka stated in an interview with IGN that eggs were chosen as the focus of the game to give the player joy from caring for and hatching eggs, and a feeling of anticipation "because you don't know what's going to come out of eggs". Animals were incorporated into the game to convey a mood of adventure, in contrast to the digital pet-based Chao creatures highlighted in the previous project, Sonic Adventure 2. The GameCube was chosen for development over the competing PlayStation 2 and Xbox because of its wide audience that Naka felt would appreciate such a family-friendly game. The game uses an engine that Naka called an "evolution" of the Sonic Adventure 2 engine. The game was exhibited at Electronic Entertainment Expo (E3) 2003. Electronic musician Yukari Fresh composed the game's main theme song, "Chant this Charm".

== Reception ==
Reception

Aggregate score
Aggregator	Score
Metacritic	71/100

Review scores
Publication	Score
Edge	7/10
Electronic Gaming Monthly	7.83/10
Eurogamer	7/10
Famitsu	32/40
Game Informer	7/10
GamePro	4/5
GameRevolution	C
GameSpot	6.7/10
GameSpy	3/5
GameZone	7.8/10
IGN	7.7/10
Nintendo Power	4.5/5
The Cincinnati Enquirer	3/5

Billy Hatcher and the Giant Egg received "mixed or average" reviews, according to video game review aggregator platform Metacritic. In Japan, Famitsu gave it a score of all four eights for a total of 32 out of 40.

== Legacy ==
Due to the game's poor sales, Sega was reluctant to consider a sequel. In spite of this, Billy would go on to appear in various other Sega titles, including Sega Superstars, Sonic Riders: Zero Gravity, and Sonic & Sega All-Stars Racing. Billy and several characters from the game also appeared in Worlds Unite, a 2015 story arc crossover between the Sonic the Hedgehog and Mega Man comic series published by Archie Comics. In December 2022, Sonic Team designer Shun Nakamura stated that he'd like to make a sequel for the game.
