= Takashi Iizuka (game designer) =

Japanese video game designer and developer

- 飯塚 隆
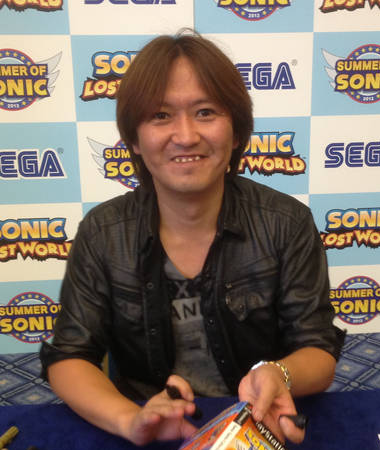
- Iizuka in 2013
- Born: March 16, 1970 (age 56); Kawaguchi, Saitama, Japan
- Other name: Iiz
- Education: Tokyo Denki University
- Occupations: Video game designer; producer; director; writer
- Employer: Sega (1992–present)
- Known for: Sonic the Hedgehog series Nights into Dreams

Takashi Iizuka (飯塚 隆, Iizuka Takashi) (born March 16, 1970) is a Japanese video game director, producer, designer and screenwriter. Since 2008, Iizuka has been the lead producer for the Sonic the Hedgehog series at Sega, as well as the head of Sonic Team. Iizuka has been credited on most mainline games in the Sonic series since 1992.

== Early life ==
Iizuka grew up in a rather strict household. His parents owned a gas station, and he received little allowance money. With so much cardboard left over from his parents' business, he used it to draw his own comics or make miniature pinball contraptions. From this, it was clear that he wanted to create. However, in his academic life, he enjoyed technical subjects such as math and physics, and also began buying and playing on computers such as the FM-7. He always enjoyed seeing video games, especially at the arcade, but aside from getting a Famicom, he could rarely afford them.

== Career ==
Iizuka became aware of Sega after being impressed by Fantasy Zone, which Sega released in arcades in 1986. When it came time to apply for a job, he wanted a slightly more engaging job rather than a purely technical one at an electronics company. He eventually landed an interview at Sega, and the interviewer suggested he be a game designer since Iizuka liked doing both graphics and programming. As part of the training process, he worked with the claw crane machines that Sega was making, both in the arcade location and the factory. He initially wanted to join the arcade division of Sega, as that was seen as the company's star. However, he was assigned to work on Mega Drive games instead.

He worked as an artist on a three-person project called Devil & Pii, which was not released but until its eventual inclusion on the Mega Drive Mini 2 in 2022. Other jobs included assistance on Golden Axe III, as well as debugging Sonic 2. Iizuka especially loved Sonic 2 and the Sonic franchise in general and wanted to work on it, but was not aware of which division made the Sonic games. Eventually, he found out they were made in America, and when the offer came to work on Sonic 3 in America, he agreed to it straightaway. He remembers that while he was in charge of the Launch Base Zone in that game, he received the order to make it more like a final level, as he found out that the game would be split into two: Sonic 3 and Sonic & Knuckles.

In 1994, Iizuka returned to Japan and was assigned to a football game, but as Yuji Naka returned to Japan and Naoto Ohshima joined him, Iizuka was invited to make a new game with them. Iizuka initially struggled to bring his ideas to life as they were repeatedly rejected. However, as NiGHTS Into Dreams began to take shape, Iizuka's idea of a dream world where children learn to grow, rather than a strict good versus evil story, was seen as positive and implemented into the game. There was no momentum to develop a Sonic game in Japan, but there was high demand overseas, so Travellers Tales made Sonic 3D Blast and Sonic R instead. However, these were not seen as true mainstream Sonic titles, and Iizuka instead proposed a Sonic RPG. However rather than an RPG, Iizuka actually had more of an action-adventure in mind.

When development shifted from Saturn to Dreamcast, it was decided to create a large-scale Sonic game in the form of Sonic Adventure, where Iizuka was made director. The scale of the game was huge, and Iizuka felt it was inappropriate to constantly bother developers initially assigned to other projects to also program for Sonic Adventure. For Sonic Adventure 2, a reverse situation was created when he requested that the game be made in the US by only taking 11 people with him from the hundred-man strong Sonic Adventure development team. It was a challenge to make a game with that small of a team within two years, but it was one that Iizuka personally enjoyed, and it still remains the Sonic game he enjoyed making the most. However, the small team size became a problem for Sonic Heroes, where Iizuka ended up being the only level designer and almost became deathly ill due to harsh deadlines.

With Sonic Colors and Sonic Generations, his role changed to that of a producer. Especially with these two games, he enjoyed steering the direction of the Sonic franchise as a whole. Iizuka insists that each Sonic game must bring in something new but also admits that the Sonic franchise has had many ups and downs. As of 2023, he became an executive for Sega, but is not in charge of a development division; rather, he oversees the Sonic business as a whole, as it became increasingly more lucrative for Sega with the launch of the movie franchise in 2021.

Iizuka reflected that because he has nurtured the Sonic franchise for more than 30 years—longer than his children—he feels a strong parental love for it.

== Works ==
Year	Title	Role
1992	Devi & Pii	Game designer, graphic artist
1993	Golden Axe III	Game designer
1994	Sonic the Hedgehog 3	Game designer
1994	Sonic & Knuckles	Game designer
1996	Nights into Dreams	Lead game designer
1996	Sonic 3D Blast	Concept design
1997	Sonic Jam	Director
1997	Sonic R	Game design director
1998	Sonic Adventure	Director, lead game designer
1999	ChuChu Rocket!	Product support
2001	Sonic Adventure 2	Director, lead game designer
2003	Sonic Heroes	Director, lead game designer
2005	Shadow the Hedgehog	Director, lead game designer, scenario
2006	Sonic Riders	Recording coordinator
2006	Sonic Rivals	Director, concept design, scenario
2007	Sonic Rivals 2	Director, concept design, scenario
2007	Mario & Sonic at the Olympic Games	General producer
2007	Nights: Journey of Dreams	Director, producer, lead game designer
2008	Sonic Riders: Zero Gravity	Recording coordinator
2008	Sonic Chronicles: The Dark Brotherhood	Character supervisor
2009	Mario & Sonic at the Olympic Winter Games	Director, game designer
2010	Sonic the Hedgehog 4: Episode I	Producer
2010	Sonic Free Riders	Scenario supervisor
2010	Sonic Colors	Producer
2011	Sonic Generations	Producer
2011	Mario & Sonic at the London 2012 Olympic Games	Character supervisor
2012	Sonic the Hedgehog 4: Episode II	Producer
2013	Sonic Lost World	Producer
2013	Mario & Sonic at the Sochi 2014 Olympic Winter Games	Character supervisor
2014	Uta Kumi 575	Project support
2014	Puyo Puyo Tetris	Project support
2015	Sonic Runners	Producer
2015	Tembo the Badass Elephant	Supervisor
2016	Mario & Sonic at the Rio 2016 Olympic Games	Character supervisor
2016	Puyo Puyo Chronicle	Project support
2017	Sonic Mania	Supervisor
2017	Sonic Forces	Sonic series producer
2019	Team Sonic Racing	Sonic series producer
2019	Mario & Sonic at the Olympic Games Tokyo 2020	Character supervisor
2022	Sonic Frontiers	Sonic series producer
2023	Sonic Superstars	Sonic series producer
2023	Sonic Dream Team	Supervisor
2024	Sonic X Shadow Generations	Sonic series producer
2025	Sonic Racing: CrossWorlds	Sonic series producer
2026	Sonic Pico Park	Sonic series producer
