= Nights: Journey of Dreams =

2007 video game

NiGHTS: Journey of Dreams
- European cover art
- Developer: Sega Studios USA
- Publisher: Sega
- Director: Takashi Iizuka
- Producer: Takashi Iizuka
- Designer: Takashi Iizuka
- Programmer: Takeshi Sakakibara
- Artist: Kazuyuki Hoshino
- Composers: Tomoko Sasaki; Naofumi Hataya
- Platform: Wii
- Release: JP: 13 December 2007; NA: 18 December 2007; AU: 24 January 2008; EU: 25 January 2008
- Genre: Action
- Modes: Single-player, multiplayer

NiGHTS: Journey of Dreams (Note: Japanese: ナイツ 〜星降る夜の物語〜 (lit. Nights ~The Story of a Starry Night~); stylised as NiGHTS: Journey of Dreams) is an action video game developed by Sega Studios USA and published by Sega for the Wii. The sequel to the 1996 Sega Saturn title Nights into Dreams, it was released in Japan and North America in December 2007, and in Australia and Europe the following month. The story follows two children, William Taylor and Helen Cartwright, who enter a dream world called Nightopia. When their nightmares come to life, they enlist the help of NiGHTS, an exiled "Nightmaren", as they journey through Nightopia to stop the evil ruler Wizeman from escaping into the real world.

As with its predecessor, gameplay is centred around Nights flying through the dreams of the two children. The main objective of the game is to fly through rings while gathering enough keys to proceed to the next level. Development of Journey of Dreams began shortly after the release of Shadow the Hedgehog in 2005, and was headed by Sonic Team veteran Takashi Iizuka. The team took steps to ensure that the game stayed faithful to the original, while incorporating a variety of new mechanics and features. The game's setting was designed to resemble England, especially parts of London.

Journey of Dreams received mixed reviews; critics praised the game's colourful visuals, boss battles, soundtrack, and special effects, but criticised its controls, camera, aesthetics, and aspects of its gameplay. Despite the mixed reception, Iizuka said that he would be interested in making a third Nights game, should Sega commission one.

== Plot ==
=== Setting ===
Every night, all human dreams are played out in Nightopia and Nightmare, the two parts of the dream world. In Nightopia, distinct aspects of dreamers' personalities are represented by luminous coloured spheres known as "Ideya". The evil ruler of Nightmare, Wizeman the Wicked, is stealing this dream energy from sleeping visitors to gather power and take control of Nightopia and eventually the real world. To achieve this, he creates "Nightmaren"—jester-like beings who can fly—including Donbalon, Girania, Chamelan, Bomamba, Cerberus and Queen Bella, and many other weaker Nightmaren. He also creates two "Level One" Nightmaren: Nights and Reala. Nights rebels against Wizeman's plans, and is imprisoned inside an Ideya palace, a gazebo-like container for dreamers' Ideya.

=== Synopsis ===
William Taylor and Helen Cartwright are two children who live in the city of Bellbridge (a fictionalised version of London). Will is an aspiring football player, Helen a prodigy violinist. Over the years, both have grown apart from their respective parents; Helen has chosen to spend more time with her friends rather than practising the violin with her mother, a choice which has begun to fill her with guilt, while Will's father is transferred to another city for work and leaves his son by himself. Both children suffer nightmares and come under attack by the Nightmaren, who chase them into the world of Nightopia. There, the two children meet and free Nights, who has the ability to merge with the children, allowing them to share Nights' body and fly through the skies. Learning that Wizeman is plotting to take over the dream world and consequently enter the real world, the children and Nights resolve to stop Wizeman, but face resistance from the Nightmaren he commands, particularly Nights' sibling, Reala.

Though different, the children's stories share similar structures. The story reaches its climax as a stairway appears at the Dream Gate and Helen and Nights ascend, only to be trapped by Wizeman and pulled into darkness. Will arrives too late and dives in after them, arriving in the night skies above Bellbridge, where he finds that he has the ability to fly without Nights or their Ideya. He rescues Helen, and the two attempt to save Nights, who has been imprisoned at the top of Bellbridge's clock tower. Reala arrives to stop their efforts and accepts Nights' challenge to battle. After defeating Reala, the trio prepare to face Wizeman. Both Will and Helen defeat Wizeman, who is subsequently destroyed. Since Wizeman kept all of his creations alive, Nights vanishes in a white light, bowing as if it were the end of a performance, and the children wake up and cry. That evening, Helen plays her violin for her mother in a crowded hall, while Will celebrates with his father after winning a football game. He then loses the ball and goes after it, only to come upon Helen playing her violin for her mother. The lights suffer a temporary blackout, and when they turn back on, Helen sees Will extending a friendly hand to her. Recognising each other from their adventures in Nightopia, the two reach for each other as it begins to snow. The final scene is of either child sleeping in their rooms at home as the camera pulls back towards Bellbridge's clock tower, atop which Nights is seen to be alive and peacefully watching over the city.

== Gameplay ==
Nights flying through one of the children's dreams. The main gameplay objective is to fly through rings and free bird-like Nightmaren, which will provide the keys required to unlock the next level.

Journey of Dreams features four different control options: the Wii remote as a standalone controller, the Wii remote in combination with the Nunchuk, the Classic Controller, and the GameCube controller. If the Wii remote is used by itself, Nights' flight is controlled by pointing it at the screen. Additionally, the game offers two multiplayer modes: "Battle Mode" and "Speed Mode", the latter of which is playable only online via Nintendo Wi-Fi Connection. "Battle Mode" allows two local players to battle each other by using a splitscreen, and "Speed Mode" revolves around players competing in races against online opponents.

Nights: Journey of Dreams is split into seven levels. The levels are distributed equally between the two children characters: three are unique to Will, three to Helen, and both share a final boss stage. Gameplay is centred around controlling Nights' flight along a predetermined route through each level, resembling that of a 2D platformer or a racing game. In each level, players initially control Will or Helen but will later on assume control of Nights. The player may collect various pick-ups while exploring the level on foot, but will be pursued by "Awakers" which will awaken the player-character and end the game, should three of them come into contact at once. The main objective of the game is to fly through rings and capture bird-like Nightmaren, who possess keys that unlock a series of cages. There are three cages in each level, and all must be unlocked within a set time before the player can proceed. Each collision with an enemy subtracts five seconds from the time remaining, and if the time runs out, the game will end prematurely. While flying, Nights can use a boost to travel faster, but the boost meter is slowly depleted while doing this. If it is fully depleted, the player will no longer be able to use boosts.

The game features items and traps which will either help or impede the player's progress. Collecting blue chips scattered around the levels will increase the player's score; time chips will extend the player's time and slow "Awakers" (if collected on foot). Flying through gold rings will replenish the player's boost meter, spiked rings will harm the player if flown through, and green rings will never disappear (unlike ordinary gold rings). The gameplay also involves the use of "persona masks", which will transform Nights into a different entity, thus granting new abilities to the player. There are three personas: transforming into a dolphin allows the player to swim underwater, a rocket speeds up Nights' flight, and a dragon will increase resistance to wind. Bosses are encountered twice in each level—an easier version early in a level, and a more difficult one at the end.

The artificial life system feature from its predecessor returns in Journey of Dreams, known as "My Dream". This feature revolves around the player raising entities called Nightopians and keeping track of their moods. "My Dreams" connects with the Wii's Forecast Channel, which will change the weather conditions in the player's "My Dream" world according to real-world forecasts. Cosmetic changes are visible every month, for example in February Nightopians hold a giant dragon for the Chinese New Year, whereas in December they are dressed as Father Christmas. Players may visit other players' "My Dreams" through the Nintendo Wi-Fi Connection. In order to increase the population in a "My Dream", Nightopians must be captured in the game's story mode. If there are more Nightopians than Nightmarens in the player's "My Dream", then the environment will look more like Nightopia and if there are more Nightmarens the landscape will change accordingly.

== Development ==
=== Prelude ===
A sequel to Nights into Dreams with the working title Air Nights was originally outlined for the Sega Saturn and subsequently developed for the Dreamcast with motion control being a central element of gameplay. In an August 1999 interview, Yuji Naka confirmed that a sequel was in development, but by December 2000 the project had been cancelled. Naka expressed reluctance to develop a sequel after the Dreamcast's discontinuation, but later noted in 2003 that he would be interested in using the licence of Nights into Dreams to reinforce Sega's identity as a video game developer. Around the same time, Nights into Dreams designer Takashi Iizuka said "as long as I'm with Sega, I will create Nights again" in an interview concerning Sonic Heroes. Discussion concerning a new game in the series had increased in frequency by 2006. Rumours regarding a Wii version continued to appear when a list of upcoming games was published by Japanese developer G.rev, which included an unspecified Nights title. Before the development of Journey of Dreams, Naka confirmed in retrospective interviews that he had intended to base the next Nights game around a unique motion controller.

=== Design ===
The game's setting was designed to be more akin to England, particularly London. Bellbridge's clock tower (left) bears a striking resemblance to Big Ben (right).

Nights: Journey of Dreams was first conceptualised in November 2005 after the release of Sonic Team's Shadow the Hedgehog. Game design was primarily prepared by Iizuka and took around six months to reach the development process. Iizuka wanted to ensure that the next Nights game would stay faithful to the original, and felt the need to keep the game's concept fundamentally the same while incorporating a variety of new mechanics. Despite the cancellation of Air Nights, Iizuka stressed that he had always wanted to make a sequel and asserted that Sega's exit from hardware manufacturing had no effect on the delay. Iizuka felt that it was the appropriate time to release a Nights game—he felt that the industry was dominated by violence and was keen to release a more family-friendly title. The team realised that Nintendo's upcoming Wii was marketed as a family-orientated console, and factored in its online features and user-friendly design.

The team wanted Journey of Dreams to revolve around a dramatic storyline in the hope that the player would find it more engaging and intuitive, as Iizuka thought the original Nights into Dreams was not user-friendly. Originally, the game had a full free-roaming 3D flight system, but Iizuka thought it was too complex and "not as fun" as the core flight element featured in the original game. Iizuka thought the most difficult challenge of the development process was keeping the game's flight mechanics fun while building upon elements of the original game. To recreate the experience, the team tested a variety of controller schemes which included the Wii remote and Nunchuk, the GameCube controller, and the Classic Controller—the latter two left for players who preferred using a traditional controller configuration. Initially, the game used the Wii remote by having the player point it at the screen, but the team discovered that its motion sensors would not pick up small movements, so Iizuka created an alternative hybrid motion-pointer system, which he believed would retain the game's fun-to-fly experience. In a retrospective interview, Iizuka said that the entire game was created from scratch and used a new engine specifically designed for the Wii.

The original character designer of Nights into Dreams, Naoto Ohshima, had left Sega by the time its sequel was under development, with Kazuyuki Hoshino being placed in charge of character design for Journey of Dreams. Takashi Iizuka, the lead game designer, felt that, with Hoshino, they captured the style used for the character in the original game. Sonic Team decided to give all characters in the game voices as Iizuka believed that full dialogue helps add depth to both the story and gameplay. With Nights already designed as an androgynous character, the team wanted to leave impressions regarding gender up to the player, despite Nights being voiced by actress Julissa Aguirre, who portrayed the character with a British accent. This is because the team designed the Nights franchise to have a distinctly British style, in contrast to Sonic the Hedgehog, which was designed to be more American. Thus, Bellbridge—the game's main setting—closely resembles London, and all of the game's characters have English accents. The development team consisted of 26 members of Sonic Team in the United States, while all sound work and CGI was developed in Japan.

=== Audio ===
Tomoko Sasaki reprised her role of lead composer from the original Nights into Dreams, and was rejoined by Sonic Team veterans Naofumi Hataya and Fumie Kumatani. Additionally, series newcomers Tomoya Ohtani, Teruhiko Nakagawa, and Tatsuyuki Maeda each contributed a few musical pieces. The game's sound effects were created primarily by Jun Senoue, better known for his musical compositions in the Sonic the Hedgehog series. According to Iizuka, the team understood that they could not compose the same style of music featured in the original game, owing to the technical revamp of Journey of Dreams. Sasaki elaborated that the original Saturn version used the console's internal music sequencer, which allowed them more control over changing the game's music as the player progressed through the game, whereas the Wii version only played the recorded music directly. Despite the limitations, both Sasaki and Hataya were able to produce a better quality soundtrack by using a wider range of instruments than what was used in the previous game. In addition, Sasaki asked an employee from Delfi Sound Inc. to record an orchestral piece for the game. Since the team were aware that the game's characters would have more dialogue than the original game, they requested that the orchestra perform a dramatic arrangement in order to put more emphasis on the game's storyline.

To make the development process as smooth as possible, Hataya tried to work in the same environment as Sasaki so that they could exchange data more efficiently. The main tools and software used during development were Digital Performer and Pro Tools, which, according to Hataya, were the standard tools used in music production. In order to stress that the atmosphere of Journey of Dreams was centred around surrealism and dreams themselves, Sasaki discarded tying the game's music down to a single genre and took the approach of not having a clear musical policy. Sasaki also ensured that each theme included the exhilaration of "flying in the air", as it was a core element of gameplay. Hataya echoed that the music of the game was produced by focusing on being able to empathise with the feeling of flying, as well as to exemplify the game's atmosphere and characters. Since the team were aware that Journey of Dreams had a greater sense of adventure than the original, the team knew that they could incorporate a larger variety of music into it so that players would enjoy a wider range of emotions. In addition to composing the music itself, Hataya took the responsibility of re-arranging Sasaki's music in different ways so that the theme matched the in-game situation. Hataya said that he and Sasaki produced around 70 percent of the game's music between them; the rest was produced by Sega's sound team.

Nights: Journey Of Dreams: Original Soundtrack was released on 26 January 2008 exclusively in Japan and contains three separate CDs with all of the music featured on the Wii version. An unofficial two-CD tribute album, Nights: Lucid Dreaming, was released by OverClocked ReMix in 2011. There are 25 tracks in total, with arrangements of the game's original soundtrack in a variety of styles. In January 2017, over 50 songs from the game and its predecessor, Nights into Dreams, became available to download on Spotify.

== Reception ==
Reception

Aggregate score
Aggregator	Score
Metacritic	69%

Review scores
Publication	Score
Electronic Gaming Monthly	7/10
Eurogamer	7/10
GameSpot	7.5/10
GameSpy	3.5/5
GamesTM	65%
GameZone	8/10
IGN	6/10
Nintendo Life	7/10
Nintendo World Report	7/10
Official Nintendo Magazine	79%
Jeuxvideo.com	13/20
VideoGamer.com	7/10
UGO Networks	5/10

Nights: Journey of Dreams received mixed to positive reviews. As of February 2017 it holds an aggregate score of 69% at Metacritic, based on an average of 47 reviews.

Many critics praised the game's colourful visuals and special effects. Chris Scullion from the Official Nintendo Magazine thought the game design had all the speed and charm of the original, and enjoyed its "lush" atmosphere and landscapes. Kevin VanOrd of GameSpot also appreciated the game's artistic design, visual "dreaminess" and elegance, and Gerald Villoria of GameSpy liked the game's colourful and vibrant levels. Nintendo Life's Anthony Dickens praised the general visual style of the game, noting that its boss battles in particular "ooze" with bright and exotic colours. Despite the general praise of the game's colourful palette, some critics viewed the aesthetics unfavourably. GameZone's Louis Bedigan felt that Nights: Journey of Dreams lacked the "eye-popping effects" of other contemporaries such as Super Mario Galaxy (2007) and The Legend of Zelda: Twilight Princess (2006), and Dickens opined that the game's cutscenes were more akin to PlayStation 2 titles. Tom Bramwell from Eurogamer felt that the environments looked like they were from 1996, despite the attempts made to distract the player from the game's simple premise. Paul Govan of GamesTM found that the game engine struggled to match the cutscene's visual fluidity with its actual gameplay, and expressed disappointment that Wii owners would be unfazed by its graphical prowess, unlike Sega Saturn owners at the time of the original Nights into Dreams release. Dickens thought the game was graphically rushed by Sega, and speculated that it was "cobbled together quickly" by artists who had focused too much on designing the game's introduction sequence. Adam Rosenberg from UGO Networks found the graphics to be a disappointment, saying that its environments were "drab" considering it was based on the dreams of twelve-year-old children, and also noticed frame rate issues. Likewise, two reviewers from Electronic Gaming Monthly, Shane Bettenhausen and Sam Kennedy, thought the 3D was "amateurish" and suffered from basic issues including uneven graphics and unskippable cutscenes.

Some reviewers criticised various aspects of gameplay, in particular the lack of checkpoints. Scullion noted how the game retained its "old school" feeling despite being aimed at a new audience, and disliked its "die, retry" style of gameplay, which he considered old-fashioned. Mark Bozon from IGN similarly criticised the game's tendencies to make the player restart an entire level upon death, calling it "a momentum killer", and Rosenberg said the automatic restarts were the game's "worst offender". Most reviewers praised the eccentricity and fun-factor of the boss battles; VanOrd believed they were enjoyable and memorable, and Jeuxvideo.com's reviewer liked the bosses' appearances and originality, but found defeating them more than once in each world repetitive. In contrast, Bramwell thought that the game's boss characters channelled a mix between Tim Burton and CBeebies, and Bozon felt that boss battles did not blend well with the main story since they were in self-contained arenas.

Reviewers disliked the game's control scheme, many stating that the use of the Wii remote was awkward and difficult to master. Bozon condemned the lack of refined flight control and noted that it was easier to use either the Classic Controller or the GameCube controller. Similarly, Scullion said that out of the three control schemes, the Wii remote was the least accurate option. VanOrd also criticized the poorly implemented use of the Wii remote, and Rosenberg thought its controls were overly responsive and unpolished; both reviewers recommended using the Classic Controller's analogue stick as an alternative. Dickens recognised that the original Nights into Dreams was one of the first games to benefit from an analogue stick, and was therefore surprised at how the sequel had a "control scheme crisis": multiple control schemes might add confusion for new players. Govan suggested that the reason why the game featured alternative control schemes was that Sonic Team wanted to emulate the original Saturn controls. In contrast, the reviewer from Jeuxvideo.com found little fault with any of the game's control schemes, and Bedigan labelled them as "excellent". Both reviewers, however, agreed that the Wii remote's motion controls did not work well with the game.

== Legacy ==
In 2010, Iizuka expressed his interest in making a third Nights game if Sega were to commission one.
