= Sega Heroes =

2018 video game

- Cover artwork of Sega Heroes, featuring (from left to right) Gum, Werebear, and ChuPea
- Developer: Demiurge Studios
- Publisher: Sega
- Platforms: Android, iOS
- Release: November 14, 2018
- Genres: Puzzle, role-playing
- Modes: Single-player, multiplayer

Sega Heroes (originally known as Sega Legends) was a free-to-play puzzle video game developed by Demiurge Studios and published by Sega for Android and iOS. Released on November 14, 2018, the game ceased operations in May 2020 following Demiurge's split from Sega to become an independent video game developer.

== Gameplay ==
Gameplay screenshot showing the player's heroes (left) fighting Dremagen's allies (right)

Sega Heroes was a match 3 game, where the player had to match three or more tiles or shapes of the same color to score points and defeat enemies on the field. There were five different colored tiles and four of them that could control a character's actions and abilities. The player had to select four characters of different colors (blue, green, red and yellow) in order to battle enemies in an event. Depending on the color of the character, the tiles that were matched determined if a character attacked an opponent. If the player matched three or more tiles of the same color together, it resulted in the hero of that color gaining energy and attacking an enemy of choice. The tiles came in four separate colors (for each color-type); red, green, yellow and blue, as well as purple for boost. Matching purple tiles together increased the multiplier, resulting in the selected heroes becoming stronger. Matching four tiles together created a star tile, while matching six tiles together created another type of Star tile that exploded a piece of the board and activated a different ability. The MAX ability triggered a character's special move.

=== Campaign and plot ===
Dremagen, styling herself as the "Master of a Thousand Dimensions", uses her power to take over the universes and timelines across time and space itself. Dremagen is able to clone any existing being at will, which she uses to her advantage by cloning heroes and villains she deems worthy to be part of her ultimate army. Amy Rose finds Ax Battler and asks for his help, though he refuses at first due to feeling too weak to take on Dremagen. Amy is able to convince Ax and the two decide to find Dremagen and defeat her before she takes over the whole universe.

Along the way, Amy and Ax recruit several others to their side, such as Blaze Fielding, AiAi the Monkey, Big the Cat, Beat, Sonic the Hedgehog, Joe Musashi, and Cream the Rabbit. The heroes also discover that Doctor Eggman and his robots have chosen to ally with Dremagen, assisting in her universal conquest. The heroes eventually confront and defeat Dremagen, vanquishing her as she swears vengeance. When the world is not restored to normal, the heroes decide to remain allied and prepare for Dremagen's inevitable return.

=== Playable characters ===
The game featured 68 playable characters, all of which were categorized by color. A team had to have included a character from each color; a red, green, blue and yellow hero. Characters were also organized by rarity; common, rare, epic, legendary and captain. Characters featured in the game originated from 15 Sega game franchises:

- Altered Beast
- ChuChu Rocket!
- Crazy Taxi
- Golden Axe
- The House of the Dead
- Jet Set Radio
- Phantasy Star
- Shenmue
- Shinobi
- Sonic the Hedgehog
- Streets of Rage
- Super Monkey Ball
- Valkyria Chronicles
- Virtua Fighter
- Yakuza

== Reception ==
Reception

Aggregate score
Aggregator	Score
Metacritic	iOS: 67/100

Review score
Publication	Score
TouchArcade	60/100

Sega Heroes received mixed reviews from critics, many praised the gameplay but criticized its difficulty. Bengt Lemne of Game Reactor found the game "highly addictive" and felt that the game's need for microtransactions was more balanced than expected Tom Reinert of Galaxy of Geek was more critical, finding the gameplay bland and overly pressuring on players to make in-app purchases due to the slow the process of leveling up characters.
