= Hirokazu Yasuhara =

Japanese video game designer (born 1965)

- 安原 広和
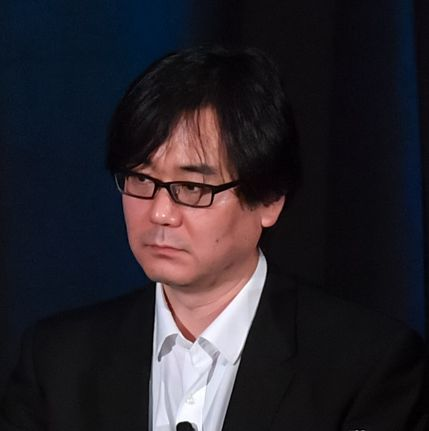
- Yasuhara in 2018
- Born: October 12, 1965 (age 60); Japan
- Other name: Carol Yas
- Education: Tokyo University of Science
- Occupation: Game designer
- Years active: 1988–2016
- Employers: Sega (1988–1999); Naughty Dog (2002–2008); Namco Bandai (2008–2012); Nintendo Software Technology (2012–2016)
- Notable work: Sonic the Hedgehog series Jak and Daxter series

Hirokazu Yasuhara (安原 広和, Yasuhara Hirokazu; born October 12, 1965), also credited as Carol Yas, is a Japanese video game designer. He is best known for designing the gameplay and stages of the initial Sonic the Hedgehog video games for Sega Genesis in the 1990s, based on technical demos and engines programmed by Yuji Naka. Yasuhara stayed with Sega until 1999. He then worked for Naughty Dog from 2002 to 2008, working on the Jak and Daxter series and Uncharted: Drake's Fortune, collaborating again with former Sega employee Mark Cerny. He was the senior design director at Namco Bandai Games America from 2008 to 2012. In April 2012, Yasuhara joined Nintendo where he accepted a position at the Nintendo Software Technology division. He left Nintendo in 2016 and has since worked for Unity Technologies.

== Works ==
Year	Title	Role
1990	Fatal Labyrinth	Game design
1991	Sonic the Hedgehog	Game design
1992	Sonic the Hedgehog 2	Game design
1994	Sonic the Hedgehog 3	Director, Game design
1994	Sonic & Knuckles	Director, Game design
1996	Sonic 3D Blast	Game design
1997	Sonic R	Map design director
2001	Floigan Bros.	Game design
2003	Jak II	Game design
2004	Jak 3	Game design
2005	Jak X: Combat Racing	Game design
2007	Uncharted: Drake's Fortune	Game design
2010	Pac-Man Party	Senior game design
2013	Mario and Donkey Kong: Minis on the Move	Game design
