= Sega Superstars =

2004 video game

- Developer: Sonic Team
- Publisher: Sega
- Director: Yoshihisa Hashimoto
- Producer: Takashi Yuda
- Designer: Yoshihisa Hashimoto
- Programmer: Takaaki Saito
- Artist: Sachiko Kawamura
- Composers: Tomoya Ohtani; Mariko Nanba; Keiichi Sugiyama
- Series: Sega All-Stars
- Platform: PlayStation 2
- Release: EU: October 22, 2004; NA: November 2, 2004; JP: November 11, 2004
- Genre: Party
- Modes: Single-player, multiplayer

Sega Superstars is a party video game developed by Sonic Team for the PlayStation 2. It was published by Sega and released in Europe on October 22, 2004; in North America on November 2, 2004; and in Japan on November 11, 2004. The game features several minigames based on various Sega titles that are controlled using the EyeToy peripheral. Upon release, the game received "average" review scores from critics.

== Gameplay ==
A promotional example of gameplay, where the player controls NiGHTS by "gliding," from the NiGHTS-themed minigame

Gameplay is similar to that of EyeToy: Play, in which players use their body to play a variety of minigames. However, while that game only picked up player's movement, Sega Superstars uses a more advanced system. Before the start of each game, a setup screen with an orange area is shown. In order to start the game, players have to stand in a position where the orange area won't pick up any movement and select the continue button. This method determines what area is the background, allowing EyeToy to pick up the player's position, as opposed to just what areas are moving.

Sega Superstars features 12 minigames, each based on different Sega franchises. Rings earned in each game can be used in a Chao Garden mode, in which players raise Chao from the Sonic the Hedgehog series.

- Sonic the Hedgehog — Using their hands, players must guide Sonic through a tube, collecting rings and Chaos Emeralds while avoiding bombs.
- Super Monkey Ball — Players use their arms to control AiAi as he rolls in a ball through a maze, aiming to reach a goal without falling off the stage.
- Samba de Amigo — Players move their hands over one of the six circles in time to the music.
- Space Channel 5 — Players must copy dance moves given by the Morolian opponents by hitting monitors with their arms.
- NiGHTS into Dreams — Using their arms as if they were flying, players guide NiGHTS through a series of rings and collectables.
- The House of the Dead — Players use their body to attack zombies that appear on-screen, being careful not to hit any hostages.
- Virtua Fighter — Players fight against various fighters, following command prompts to attack them while also defending against their attacks.
- Billy Hatcher — Players must use rolling motions to help Billy Hatcher roll a giant egg around and clear each level.
- Puyo Pop Fever — Players use their entire body to funnel colored Puyos into their respective departments, being careful not to accidentally roll in a bomb.
- ChuChu Rocket! — Players use their hands to activate mechanisms and guide ChuChus to a rocket while protecting them from a hungry cat.
- Virtua Striker — Players must knock falling soccer balls into floating balloons to score points.
- Crazy Taxi — Players attempt to make as much movement and noise as possible to attract the attention of a taxi.

== Development ==
Before Sega Superstars, few games had made use of the EyeToy. As such, the game was developed as a product that would combine the novelty of this accessory with the familiarity of Sega's first-party franchises to extend the long-term viability of the PlayStation 2 console. It was announced in April 2004, and exhibited at the Electronic Entertainment Expo (E3) and Tokyo Game Show events of that same year.

== Reception ==
Reception

Aggregate score
| Aggregator | Score |
|---|---|
| Metacritic | 72/100 |

Review scores
| Publication | Score |
|---|---|
| 1Up.com | B |
| Edge | 7/10 |
| Electronic Gaming Monthly | 5.67/10 |
| Eurogamer | 8/10 |
| Famitsu | 32/40 |
| Game Informer | 8/10 |
| GameSpot | 7.3/10 |
| GameZone | 8.3/10 |
| IGN | 7/10 |
| Official U.S. PlayStation Magazine | 4/5 |
| The Sydney Morning Herald | 3.5/5 |

The game received "average" reviews, according to the review aggregation website Metacritic. In Japan, Famitsu gave it a score of two nines and two sevens for a total of 32 out of 40.
