= Sonic Riders: Zero Gravity =

2008 video game

- Developer: Sonic Team
- Publisher: Sega
- Director: Kenjiro Morimoto
- Producer: Kenjiro Morimoto
- Designers: Kenjiro Morimoto; Hiroshi Miyamoto; Masanosuke Shimizu
- Programmer: Kenichi Koshida
- Artists: Hideaki Moriya; Tomohisa Ishikawa
- Writers: Masahiko Shiraishi; Shiro Maekawa; Hiroshi Miyamoto
- Composers: Kenichi Tokoi; Fumie Kumatani; Hideaki Kobayashi; Tomonori Sawada
- Series: Sonic the Hedgehog
- Platforms: PlayStation 2 Wii
- Release: NA: January 8, 2008; JP: January 17, 2008 (Wii); EU: February 22, 2008; AU: March 6, 2008
- Genre: Racing
- Modes: Single-player, multiplayer

Sonic Riders: Zero Gravity (Note: Japanese: ソニックライダーズ シューティングスターストーリー, Hepburn: Sonikku Raidāzu Shūtingu Sutā Sutōrī; lit. 'Sonic Riders: Shooting Star Story') is a 2008 racing video game developed by Sonic Team and published by Sega for the PlayStation 2 and Wii. It is a sequel to Sonic Riders (2006), a spinoff in the Sonic the Hedgehog series. In the game, players control Sonic characters as they race against opponents on hoverboards, using gravity to manipulate the courses; the game features several game modes, including a story mode involving Sonic and friends retrieving the "Arks of the Cosmos", a set of extraterrestrial relics that control gravity.

Development on Sonic Riders: Zero Gravity began shortly after the release of the first game. It was originally envisioned for the Xbox 360 and PlayStation 3; it was directed and produced by Kenjiro Morimoto, who also served as a designer. It was released in North America and Japan in January 2008, and in Europe the following month. Upon release, it received mixed reviews from critics, who praised the graphics, track designs, and music, but criticized the controls, story, and lack of online multiplayer; reviewers were also divided on various gameplay elements, particularly the gravity mechanics and overall complexity. A sequel, Sonic Free Riders, was released for the Xbox 360 in 2010.

== Gameplay ==
An example of gameplay in Sonic Riders: Zero Gravity. Players control characters on various kinds of Extreme Gear.

Sonic Riders: Zero Gravity is a racing game that plays largely identically to its predecessor. It is based around a set of anti-gravity devices called "Extreme Gear". Players compete to complete three laps around the course the fastest, with each race having upwards of eight characters. The trick system from the first game returns, now requiring players to time their jumps off ramps for better ranks. Each character in Zero Gravity has their own statistics that affect their performance, and are restricted from using certain Extreme Gear. Characters are divided into three classes: Speed characters are able to use grind rails, Fly characters can fly through boost rings, and Power characters can break through select obstacles.

In addition to the mechanics from the previous game, Zero Gravity adds a new gameplay system based around gravity that replaces the predecessor's "air tank" system. During the race, performing tricks and other actions will increase a character's Gravity Points, or GP. If players have accrued enough GP, they can perform one of two maneuvers. A Gravity Dive will create a small black hole that points gravity forward down the track, giving the player a powerful free-fall boost that is further augmented by striking objects in the vicinity that the hole displaces, such as trains or signs. Alternatively, Gravity Control will alter the gravity of the course, allowing players to reach otherwise-inaccessible areas and shortcuts. Players can also use Gravity Control to more easily maneuver around sharp corners.

Building on the upgrade system from Sonic Riders, Zero Gravity features a new system called "Gear Change". Once players gain a certain number of rings during a race, they can choose to activate one of their Gear-specific special abilities, such as increasing a character's top speed or automatically accessing shortcuts. In addition to the boards, skates, and bikes from the previous game, Zero Gravity also introduces three new types of Extreme Gear: air rides, yachts, and wheels. New Extreme Gear can be unlocked via the in-game shop, with different Gear providing different advantages and unique abilities.

Sonic Riders: Zero Gravity is divided into two story campaigns, "Heroes" and "Babylon", which intersect with one another to create a single narrative, though only the Heroes campaign is available at the start of the game. Zero Gravity also adds a Survival Mode split across three types. Survival Battle entails each player picking up missiles, then lock on and launch them at foes with Gravity Control, the winner being the last person standing. In Survival Relay, teams of two compete in a relay race, using their Extreme Gear as the baton. Survival Ball is a soccer-like minigame, in which players use Gravity Control to launch a ball through hoops. The game includes a total of 16 race tracks, spread across eight areas with two tracks each, which are unlocked via story progression.

The Wii version supports two different Wii Remote control schemes, which utilize motion controls to steer and perform Gravity Dives; traditional controls are also available via the use of the Nintendo GameCube controller.

=== Characters ===
A total of 18 playable characters can be unlocked, including guest characters from Billy Hatcher and the Giant Egg, Nights into Dreams, and Samba de Amigo.

- Amigo
- Amy Rose
- Billy Hatcher
- Blaze the Cat
- Cream the Rabbit
- Dr. Eggman
- Jet the Hawk
- Knuckles the Echidna
- Miles "Tails" Prower
- NiGHTS
- Rouge the Bat
- SCR-HD
- SCR-GP
- Shadow the Hedgehog
- Silver the Hedgehog
- Sonic the Hedgehog
- Storm the Albatross
- Wave the Swallow

== Plot ==
The Babylon Rogues retrieve an Ark of the Cosmos, one of five relics capable of controlling gravity, intending to use them all to power Babylon Garden's warp engine. Other Arks fall from the sky, with one of them striking technology company MeteoTech's Crimson Tower. As a result, the robots inside go haywire and begin a global rampage. Sonic, who is traveling with Tails and Knuckles, finds one of the Arks. He is attacked by the robots, but uses the Ark's power to escape. While being pursued, the trio runs into Amy, who has also found one of the Arks. The four head to MeteoTech to investigate, where they run into the Rogues, and Storm chases after Amy in an attempt to take her Ark. The others venture further inside, where they discover the company's owner, Doctor Eggman. Eggman reveals that one of the robots, SCR-HD, was struck by the Ark that hit Crimson Tower, giving it sentience and leadership over the other robots. The robots now seek to obtain all five Arks, one of which Eggman used to power the mother computer which controls all of MeteoTech.

Amy surrenders her Ark of the Cosmos to Storm, but the two are attacked by a robot. It suddenly explodes and Storm finds another Ark inside, running off to find Jet. Eggman steals the Rogues' Arks and retreats towards the Crimson Tower, planning to use it to control all the world's robots, with the Rogues in pursuit. Sonic and the others retrieve Amy and travel to Crimson Tower to shut down the mother computer. They meet the Rogues there, and Jet challenges Sonic to one last race, with the winner getting all the Arks. The two storm the tower and take back the Arks, shutting down all the robots. The Arks' resonance calls down the Babylon Garden, and Sonic hands his Arks over to Jet.

Before they can leave, SCR-HD appears and steals the Arks of the Cosmos, retreating to Babylon Garden. SCR-HD activates the Arks, revealing an ancient spaceship inside Babylon Garden, creating a massive black hole capable of destroying the planet and transforming into a monstrous robot named Master Core ABIS. Eggman escapes while the heroes and Rogues head for the ship and defeat ABIS with Gravity Dives, shutting down the Arks and stopping the black hole, leaving the ship adrift in orbit. In the aftermath, Tails speculates that the Babylonians' ancestors were aliens who lost control of their ship, releasing the Arks into orbit to shut it down before crash landing, hoping the Arks would one day return to the surface so they could return to their home planet. Jet arrives and challenges Sonic, who happily accepts.

== Development and release ==
Sonic Riders: Zero Gravity was developed by Sonic Team for the PlayStation 2 and Wii, though it was originally envisioned for the Xbox 360 and PlayStation 3. The game was directed and produced by Kenjiro Morimoto, who also served as a designer alongside Hiroshi Miyamoto and Masanosuke Shimizu. The game features CG animated cutscenes by Studio Anima, directed by Kiyonobu Kitada.

Sega announced the game on August 22, 2007 at the Games Convention. It released in North America on January 8, 2008, followed by Japan on January 17, Europe on February 22, and Australia on March 6. The PlayStation 2 port was not released in Japan.

=== Music ===
The music of Sonic Riders: Zero Gravity was composed by Kenichi Tokoi, Fumie Kumatani, Hideaki Kobayashi, and Tomonori Sawada. Sawada explained that compared to the first game, whose soundtrack emphasized the high-speeds, the score of Zero Gravity aimed to be more dramatic to convey the story's mystique. The main theme, "Un-Gravitify," was performed by Kieron Cashell, an Irish vocalist active in Japan; Jet's theme, "Catch Me If You Can," was performed by Runblebee.

A soundtrack album, "Sonic Riders: Shooting Star Story" Original Soundtrack "Zero Gravity Tracks", (Note: Japanese: 『ソニックライダーズ シューティングスターストーリー』 オリジナルサウンドトラック "Zero Gravity Tracks", Hepburn: “Sonikku Raidāzu Shūtingu Sutā Sutōrī” Orijinaru Saundotorakku "Zero Gravity Tracks") was released alongside the game in Japan by Wave Master.

== Reception and legacy ==
Reception

Aggregate scores
Aggregator	Score
GameRankings	59.31% (PS2); 57.04% (Wii)
Metacritic	56/100 (PS2); 56/100 (Wii)

Review scores
Publication	Score
1Up.com	C−
Eurogamer	4/10
Game Informer	6/10
GamePro	3/5
GameSpot	5.0/10 (PS2); 4.5/10 (Wii)
GameTrailers	4.9/10
GameZone	5/10 (Wii)
IGN	5.8/10
Nintendo Power	7/10
Official Nintendo Magazine	72%

Sonic Riders: Zero Gravity received mixed reviews from critics. Aggregating review websites GameRankings and Metacritic assigned the PlayStation 2 version 59.31% and 56/100 and the Wii version 57.04% and 56/100.

Like its predecessor, Zero Gravity received criticism towards its controls. David Ellis of 1Up.com criticized how awkward it was to steer due to needing to hold forward on the control stick. Writing for GameSpot, Joe Dodson said "The basic Wii tilt controls are imprecise, and it's easy to find yourself ping-ponging between walls. You can and should use the D pad, although you can't disable the tilt controls." The Wii version also received further criticism for its motion controls, as well as not supporting the Classic Controller, with 1Up.com and GameSpot giving it a lower score than the PlayStation 2 version for those reasons. Many critics recommended using the GameCube controller in the Wii version.

Critics generally praised its graphics and sound. GameSpot praised it for conveying a sense of speed and its "catchy" music and smack-talk between characters. GameTrailers similarly praised its speed, but also noted that it could make it difficult to see where the player was going; they also noted the reuse of voice clips from the first Riders. IGN was more conflicted in their review; Mark Bozon described it as "one of the slicker looking SEGA titles thus far on Wii and PS2," as well praising as the CG cutscenes, but disliked the overly generic designs of its new characters. Luis Bedighan had felt that the game lacked any courses that stood out; he felt the techno soundtrack fit the game's aesthetic, but got repetitive after awhile..

Reviewers were conflicted on the new gameplay mechanics, as well as the overall complexity of the game. Writing about the new gravity mechanics, Bozon said "without an overall boost ability the entire experience feels a bit slower now, as you won't be cashing in trick points for turbo," as well as feeling the new boost system ultimately made for a slower gameplay experience. Eurogamer also critiqued the gravity system for disrupting the flow of races, a sentiment shared by Game Informer despite believing it to be an interesting concept. Official Nintendo Magazine UK was more positive in their assessment of Zero Gravity, believing that its complexity made up for it with its depth and content. Additional criticism was directed at the game's lack of online multiplayer outside of its leaderboards, as well as its writing and story.

A sequel, Sonic Free Riders, released in 2010 for the Xbox 360 as a launch title for the Kinect peripheral. It abandoned the gravity-based mechanics of its Zero Gravity, instead having players controlling their character using motion controls. It received generally negative reviews from critics due to the perceived unreliability of its controls.
