= ChuChu Rocket! =

1999 video game

- Developer: Sonic Team
- Publisher: Sega
- Director: Yuji Naka
- Producer: Yuji Naka
- Designer: Takafumi Kaya
- Programmers: Shinya Matsunami; Yasuhiro Takahashi; Junichi Takeda; Masanobu Yamamoto
- Artists: Yuji Uekawa; Sachiko Kawamura
- Composer: Tomoya Ohtani
- Platforms: Dreamcast, Game Boy Advance, iOS, Android
- Release: November 11, 1999: Dreamcast; JP: November 11, 1999; NA: March 7, 2000; EU: June 9, 2000 Game Boy Advance; JP: March 21, 2001; NA: June 11, 2001; EU: December 7, 2001 iOS; WW: October 28, 2010 Android; WW: November 22, 2011
- Genre: Action puzzle
- Modes: Single-player, multiplayer

ChuChu Rocket! (Note: Japanese: チューチューロケット!, Hepburn: ChūChū Roketto!) is a 1999 action puzzle game developed by Sonic Team and published by Sega for the Dreamcast. The objective is for the player to place arrows on a board to lead mice into escape rockets while avoiding cats. The game features single-player modes in which a player must save all the mice on a board, and a multiplayer mode in which players battle to collect the most mice.

Directed and produced by Yuji Naka, ChuChu Rocket! was developed to test the Dreamcast's processing power by displaying many characters at once, and also to test the online functionality of the Dreamcast and Sega's servers, as it was the first Dreamcast game designed to make use of online. The knowledge gained from the network portion of the project helped Sonic Team in their development of Phantasy Star Online (2000). When it arrived in the United States, Sega held an online tournament where players could battle against Sega and Sonic Team employees. In PAL regions, it was given free to subscribers of Sega's online gaming service Dreamarena. Although Sega's online services have long shut down, the game can still be played online via private servers.

ChuChu Rocket! was a commercial and critical success. Critics praised the chaotic and addictive multiplayer and the simple and cute Japanese aesthetic. Sega's network gaming service received some criticism for lag. ChuChu Rocket! was ported to the Game Boy Advance in 2001 as a launch game, and gathered interest as the first game published by Sega for Nintendo hardware. It was later ported to iOS and Android; both of these versions were delisted from their storefronts in 2015.

== Gameplay ==
Competitive four-player gameplay. Players place arrows to direct mice towards their rocket, and cats towards their opponents'.

ChuChu Rocket! is an action puzzle game. The basic rules of the game require the player to guide mice, dubbed "ChuChus", into a rocket while evading them from dangerous cats, dubbed "KapuKapus". A brief premise is provided in the instruction manual, explaining that ChuChus are living on a space port that is invaded by KapuKapus one day. In their frantic state, the ChuChus begin running around in chaos, and so the player must guide them to their rockets to save them. Both ChuChus and KapuKapus run in a straight line, and turn right when they hit walls. A player can place up, down, left, and right arrows on the field of play, redirecting characters that step on them. Up to three arrows can be placed by a player at any time; placing a fourth arrow will make the player's oldest arrow vanish, and all arrows fade away over time. If a KapuKapu hits an arrow twice, the arrow disappears.

There are several modes of play within ChuChu Rocket! including a single-player puzzle mode, a puzzle editing mode, a cooperative challenge mode, and competitive multiplayer modes. In the puzzle mode, the player is provided a limited set of arrows to place on the field to save all the ChuChus in play. The puzzle editing mode allows players to create their own puzzles like this. In the challenge mode, players are given 30 seconds to save the ChuChus in play without any arrow limitations as in puzzle mode. In the competition modes, each player has a rocket and must guide as many ChuChus as possible into their rocket in the time limit. This mode supports up to four players, either in free-for-all or team-based fashion.

ChuChu Rocket! is notable for being the first Dreamcast online multiplayer game. During the time Sega was operating its servers, players were able to play the competitive modes online, while also being able to upload their custom puzzles and download those made by other users. Players could use an onscreen or physical keyboard to chat with other players. Servers for the game's online functionality were brought back online by fans in 2016.

== Development ==
ChuChu Rocket! was developed by Sonic Team. Director and producer Yuji Naka conceived the game as a way to use the power of the Dreamcast to create 100 sprites moving at once. He believed there are two trends to use evolving hardware: one is to make increasingly beautiful graphics, while the other is to squeeze as much processing power to use it to its fullest; he chose the latter in this case. Naka and his team found difficulty working on the networking component, but believed it was a good learning experience. Part of ChuChu Rocket!'s purpose was to test the capabilities of online multiplayer gaming on the Dreamcast; the team used what they learned to help drive the development of Phantasy Star Online (2000). A NAOMI arcade version of the game was also planned, but later scrapped.

== Promotion and release ==
Sega announced ChuChu Rocket! on September 2, 1999 as Sonic Team's second game for the Dreamcast after Sonic Adventure (1998). Prior to the game's release in Japan in November 1999, Sega promoted the game with a website dedicated to ChuChu Rocket!, and a 15-second commercial advertising the game was solicited to television stations across the country, with the commercial also made available to download through the website. ChuChu Rocket! released in Japan on November 11, 1999 and climbed to the top of the Japanese sales charts in its first week on sale, selling 35,000 copies and knocking the PlayStation release of Chrono Trigger off the top spot. That December, video game magazine Famitsu held a contest using a ChuChu-themed minigame for the Dreamcast Visual Memory Unit (VMU) that could be downloaded from the internet. Players who completed the minigame were given a password to send to Famitsu. Various prizes were given out to winners of the contest, including Dreamcast controllers, VMU stickers, and pens.

In January 2000, Sega of America announced it would bring ChuChu Rocket! to North America on March 2, 2000, three months earlier than the original anticipated release in June. Prior to the North American release of the game, a Shockwave demo featuring 30 levels from the game's puzzle mode was made available to play on personal computers through Sega's website. ChuChu Rocket! was released in North America on March 7, 2000, a week later than had been announced earlier. It retailed for $29.99 in America — below the average for new Dreamcast games. Sega held an online tournament on March 25, 2000 where players could battle with members of Sonic Team, the Dreamcast network team, and other Sega employees in online matches.

The European and PAL versions were not released until months after the North American release, on June 9, 2000. In Europe, ChuChu Rocket! was mailed free to subscribers of Dreamarena, the European Dreamcast online gaming service. At the time of the game's release in Europe, Dreamarena had over 25,000 subscribers, despite the absence of online play beforehand.

=== Ports ===
A port of ChuChu Rocket! was released as a launch game for the Game Boy Advance in Japan on March 21, 2001. The release garnered interest as the first game Sega published for a Nintendo system. This version retains all the gameplay modes of the Dreamcast version except online play. Players can use Game Link Cables to connect up to four systems together to play using only one cartridge. Sonic Team also selected 2,500 of the 17,000 custom puzzles uploaded to the Dreamcast servers to include in the game. The polygonal graphics from the Dreamcast version are replaced with animated sprites. Players can also edit their own character sprites. This version of ChuChu Rocket! was re-released on the Wii U in Japan on October 21, 2015. ChuChu Rocket! was also included as part of a 2-in-1 Sonic Advance cartridge for the Game Boy Advance released on 11 November 2005.

Sega released iOS and Android ports of ChuChu Rocket! in 2010 and 2011. The iOS version featured local multiplayer over Wi-Fi. Both were removed from purchase in 2015.

== Reception ==
Reception (Dreamcast version)

Aggregate scores
Aggregator	Score
GameRankings	86% (DC); 83% (GBA)
Metacritic	84/100 (GBA)

Review scores
Publication	Score
AllGame	4/5
Famitsu	34/40
GameSpot	8.2/10
GameSpy	8/10
IGN	9.0/10
Next Generation	4/5 (Dreamcast); 3/5 (GBA)
Arcade	4/5
Dreamcast Magazine (JP)	9/10
Dreamcast Magazine (UK)	92%

The Dreamcast version of ChuChu Rocket! received highly positive reviews. Critics highlighted the multiplayer modes as being great fun and addictive. Stuart Taylor of Dreamcast Magazine (UK) called the multiplayer the "bread and butter" of ChuChu Rocket!, and praised it for being easy to pick up and put down. He concluded the game was "shamelessly retro and monstrously addictive." Other critics also picked up on the game's Japanese and retro aesthetics, citing the simple, cute, and kawaii graphics. Some reviewers drew attention to the game's "chaos" and "insanity", such as Nick Jones writing for Arcade, who said the game was "complete madness and rates as an example of Japanese gaming eccentricity at its very finest". In addition critics also praised the game for its low retail price, giving a great fresh experience to gamers on a budget. The most common complaints were in regards to the game's network component. Some critics noted problems with lag in their games, as well as difficulty getting logged in. Concluding their thoughts, IGN staff called it "quite simply the best multiplayer effort [they]'ve played in years, on any console." Chris Simpson of AllGame said: "ChuChu Rocket! is the most rapidly paced game I have ever had the pleasure of playing...The multiplayer will become a benchmark of quality." Jeff Lundrigan for Next Generation stated that it is a "terrific little puzzler every Dreamcast owner should have".

The Game Boy Advance port of ChuChu Rocket! also received generally favorable reviews. The game is almost identical to the Dreamcast version, and thus reviewers generally shared the same thoughts as those on the Dreamcast version. Some complaints were made about the D-pad controls being inferior to the Dreamcast's analog stick. However, praise was given for the ability to hook up four Game Boy Advances and play multiplayer using only one cartridge, and also for the inclusion of 2,500 user-created stages uploaded to the Dreamcast servers. Next Generation called the hundreds of maps in puzzle mode the "main draw" of the game.

== Legacy ==
A follow-up to ChuChu Rocket!, Dee Dee Planet, was in development and scheduled for release on the Dreamcast in 2001. The game similarly focused on online multiplayer with gameplay similar to the Worms series. It was reportedly cancelled due to the bugs and problems with its network play. In 2021, a near-complete beta copy of the game was obtained and leaked onto the internet. Fans eventually fixed the bugs, making it completely playable online the following year.

In the GameCube versions of Phantasy Star Online Episode I & II (2002) and Billy Hatcher and the Giant Egg (2003), a limited version of the Game Boy Advance port can be unlocked and played via the GameCube – Game Boy Advance link cable. Minigames inspired by ChuChu Rocket! were included in Sega Superstars (2004) and Sega Superstars Tennis (2008). ChuBei, Chuih, ChuPea, and ChuBach are also playable characters in Sonic & Sega All-Stars Racing and Sega Heroes.

=== ChuChu Rocket! Universe ===
A sequel, ChuChu Rocket! Universe, developed by Hardlight, was released on September 19, 2019 for iOS, macOS and tvOS as a launch game for Apple Arcade. It was removed in September 2022 without warning.
