= Nights into Dreams =

1996 video game

- European cover art
- Developer: Sonic Team
- Publisher: Sega
- Director: Naoto Ohshima
- Producer: Yuji Naka
- Designer: Takashi Iizuka
- Programmer: Yuji Naka
- Artists: Kazuyuki Hoshino; Naoto Ohshima
- Composers: Naofumi Hataya; Tomoko Sasaki; Fumie Kumatani
- Platforms: Sega Saturn; PlayStation 2; Windows; PlayStation 3; Xbox 360
- Release: 5 July 1996: Sega Saturn; JP: 5 July 1996; NA: 20 August 1996; EU: 5 September 1996 PlayStation 2; JP: 21 February 2008 Windows; WW: 2 October 2012 PlayStation 3; NA: 2 October 2012; EU: 3 October 2012; JP: 4 October 2012 Xbox 360; WW: 5 October 2012
- Genre: Action
- Modes: Single-player, multiplayer

Nights into Dreams (Note: Japanese: ナイツ, Hepburn: Naitsu; stylised as NiGHTS into dreams...) is a 1996 action game developed by Sonic Team and published by Sega for the Sega Saturn. The story follows the teenagers Elliot Edwards and Claris Sinclair, who enter Nightopia, a dream world where all dreams take place. With the help of Nights, an exiled "Nightmaren", they begin a journey to stop the evil ruler Wizeman from destroying Nightopia and consequently the real world. Players control Nights flying through Elliot and Claris's dreams to gather enough energy to defeat Wizeman and save Nightopia. The game is presented in 3D and imposes time limits on every level, in which the player must accumulate points to proceed.

Development began after the release of Sonic & Knuckles in 1994, although the concept originated in 1992, during the development of Sonic the Hedgehog 2. Development was led by Sonic Team veterans Yuji Naka, Naoto Ohshima, and Takashi Iizuka. Naka began the project with the idea of flight, and Ohshima designed Nights as an androgynous character that resembles an angel that could fly like a bird. The team conducted research on dreaming and REM sleep, and was influenced by the works and theories of psychoanalysts Carl Jung and Sigmund Freud. An analogue controller, the Saturn 3D controller, was designed alongside the game and included with some retail copies.

Nights into Dreams received acclaim for its graphics, gameplay, soundtrack, and atmosphere. It has appeared on several best-of lists from various publications. A shorter Christmas-themed version, Christmas Nights, was released in December 1996. Nights into Dreams was ported to the PlayStation 2 in 2008 in Japan and a high-definition version was released worldwide for Windows, PlayStation 3, and Xbox 360 in 2012. A sequel, Nights: Journey of Dreams, was released for the Wii in 2007.

== Gameplay ==
Nights flying through Elliot's first level, Splash Garden, in the Saturn version. From left to right, the interface displays the number of orbs collected, time limit, and score.

Nights into Dreams is split into seven levels, referred to as "Dreams". The levels are distributed between the two teenage characters: three are unique to Claris, three to Elliot, and each play through an identical final seventh level, "Twin Seeds". Initially, only Claris' "Spring Valley" and Elliot's "Splash Garden" levels are available, and successful completion of one of these unlocks the next level in that character's path. Previously completed stages may be revisited to improve the player's high scores; a grade between A and F is given to the player upon completion, but a "C" grade (or better) in all the selected character's levels must be achieved to unlock the relevant "Twin Seeds" stage for that character. Points are accumulated depending on how fast the player completes a level, and extra points are awarded when the player flies through rings.

Each level is split up into four "Mares" set in Nightopia and a boss fight which takes place in Nightmare. In each level, players initially control Claris or Elliot, who immediately have their Ideyas (spherical objects that contain emotions) of hope, wisdom, intelligence and purity stolen from them by Wizeman's minions, leaving behind only their Ideya of courage. The goal of each Mare is to recover one of the stolen Ideya by collecting 20 blue chips and delivering them to the cage holding the Ideyas, which overloads and releases the orb it holds. If the player walks around the landscape for too long, they are pursued by a sentient alarm clock which awakens the character and ends the level if it comes into contact with the player. The majority of the gameplay centres on flying sequences, which are triggered by walking into the Ideya Palace near the start of each level so that the character merges with the imprisoned Nights. Once the flying sequence is initiated, the time limit begins.

In the flying sections, the player controls Nights' flight along a predetermined route through each Mare, resembling that of a 2D platformer. The player has only a limited period of time available before Nights falls to the ground and transforms back into Claris or Elliot, and each collision with an enemy subtracts five seconds from the time remaining. The player's time is replenished each time they return an Ideya to the Ideya Palace. While flying, Nights can use a "Drill Dash" to travel faster, as well as defeat certain reverie enemies scattered throughout the level. Grabbing onto certain enemies causes Nights to spin around, which launches both Nights and the enemy in the direction the boost was initiated. Various acrobatic manoeuvres can be performed, including the "Paraloop", whereby flying around in a complete circle and connecting the trail of stars left in Nights' wake causes any items within the loop to be attracted towards Nights. The game features a combo system known as "Linking", whereby actions such as collecting items and flying through rings are worth more points when performed in quick succession. Power-ups may be gained by flying through several predetermined rings, indicated by a bonus barrel. The power-ups include a speed boost, point multiplier and an air pocket.

The player receives a grade based on their score at the end of each Mare, and an overall grade for the level after clearing all four Mares. Nights is then transported to Nightmare for a boss fight against one of Wizeman's "Level Two" Nightmarens. Each boss fight has a time limit, and the game ends if the player runs out of time during the battle. Upon winning the boss fight, the player is awarded a score multiplier based on how quickly the boss was defeated, which is then applied to the score earned in the Nightopia section to produce the player's final score for that Dream. In the multiplayer mode, two players battle in splitscreen. One player controls Nights, whereas the other controls Reala. The winner is the first player to hit or paraloop the other three times.

The game features an artificial life system known as "A-Life", which involves entities called Nightopians and keeps track of their moods. It is possible to have them mate with other Nightopians, which creates hybrids known as "Superpians". The more the game is played, the more inhabitants appear, and environmental features and aesthetics change. The A-Life system features an evolving music engine, allowing tempo, pitch, and melody to alter depending on the state of Nightopians within the level. The feature runs from the Sega Saturn's internal clock, which alters features in the A-Life system depending on the time.

== Plot ==
Every night, all human dreams are played out in Nightopia and Nightmare, the two parts of the dream world. In Nightopia, distinct aspects of dreamers' personalities are represented by luminous coloured spheres known as "Ideya". The evil ruler of Nightmare, Wizeman the Wicked, is stealing this dream energy from sleeping visitors in order to gather power and take control of Nightopia and eventually the real world. To achieve this, he creates five beings called "Nightmaren": jester-like, flight-capable beings, which include Jackle, Clawz, Gulpo, Gillwing and Puffy as well as many minor maren. He also creates two "Level One" Nightmaren: Nights and Reala. However, Nights rebels against Wizeman's plans, and is punished by being imprisoned inside an Ideya palace, a container for dreamers' Ideya.

One day, Elliot Edwards and Claris Sinclair, two teenagers from the city of Twin Seeds, go through failures. Elliot, a basketball player, is challenged by a group of older students and suffers a humiliating defeat on the court. Claris, a singer, is overcome by stage fright when auditioning for judges, which causes her to lose all hopes of getting the role. When they go to sleep that night, both Elliot and Claris suffer nightmares that replay the events. They escape into Nightopia and find that they both possess the rare Red Ideya of Courage, the only type that Wizeman cannot steal. Elliot and Claris release Nights, who tells them about dreams and Wizeman and his plans; the three begin a journey to stop Wizeman and restore peace to Nightopia. When they defeat Wizeman and Reala, peace is returned to Nightopia and the world of Nightmare is suppressed.

The next day, in Twin Seeds, a centenary ceremony begins. Elliot walks through the parade and has a vision of Nights looking at him through a billboard. Realizing that Claris is performing in a hall, Elliot runs through the crowd and sees Claris on stage in front of a large audience, singing well. The two look at each other and transition to Nightopia.

== Development ==
I headed back to Japan so that I could work with Mr Ohshima and while I was waiting for the plane to take off, I thought, 'Let's make a game where we can fly!' So I guess that's where it all started.

— Producer Yuji Naka in an interview with Sega Saturn Magazine

Nights was developed by Sonic Team, the Sega development division that had created the Sonic the Hedgehog games for Genesis. The Nights concept originated during the development of Sonic the Hedgehog 2 in 1992, but development did not begin until after the release of Sonic & Knuckles in late 1994. Programming began in April 1995 and total development spanned six months. Yuji Naka was lead programmer and producer, Naoto Ohshima was director and Takashi Iizuka was lead designer. Naka and Ohshima felt they had spent enough time with the Sonic franchise and were eager to work on new concepts. According to Naka, the initial development team consisted of seven people, and grew to 20 as programmers arrived.

Sonic creator and project director Ohshima created the character of Nights based on his inspirations from travelling Europe and western Asia. The design incorporated Japanese, European, and American elements to give Nights as universal an appeal as possible. Ohshima decided that the character should resemble an angel and fly like a bird. In the story, Nights is a part of every human's subconsciousness, and so was designed to be neither male nor female. Nights' personality is intended to be a "a mirror of the child's personality".

Naka intended to make Nights into Dreams a slow-paced game, but as development progressed the pace gradually increased, in similar vein to Sonic games. The initial concept envisioned the flying character in a rendered 2D sprite art, with side-scrolling features similar to Sonic the Hedgehog. The team were hesitant to switch to 3D, as Naka was sceptical that appealing characters could be created with polygons, in contrast to traditional pixel sprites, which the designers found "more expressive". According to Iizuka, the design and story took two years to finalise. The difficulty was designed so that young and inexperienced players would be able to complete the game, while more experienced players would be compelled by the replay value.

Nights was developed using Silicon Graphics workstations for graphical designs and Saturn emulators running on Hewlett-Packard machines for programming. There were problems during early stages of development because of a lack of games to use as reference; the team had to redesign the Spring Valley level numerous times and build "everything from scratch". The team only sparingly used the Sega Graphics Library operating system, said by many developers to make programming for the Saturn dramatically easier, and instead mostly used custom libraries. Because the Sonic Team offices did not include soundproof studios, team members recorded sound effects at night. According to Naka, every phrase in the game has a meaning; for example, "abayo" is Japanese slang for "goodbye". The team felt that the global market would be less resistant to a game featuring full 3D CGI cut scenes than 2D anime. Norihiro Nishiyama, the designer of the in-game movies, felt that the 3D cutscenes were a good method to show the concepts of dreaming and waking up. Naka said that they incorporate realism to make it more difficult for the player to disambiguate the boundary between dreams and reality.

The development took longer than expected because of the team's inexperience with Saturn hardware and uncertainty about using the full 560 megabyte space on the CD-ROM. They initially thought the game would consume around 100 megabytes of data, and at one point considered releasing it on two discs. Iizuka said that the most difficult part of development was handling the "contradiction" of using 2D sidescroller controls in a fully 3D game. Naka limited the flying mechanic to "invisible 2D tracks" because early beta testing revealed that the game was too difficult in full 3D. The standard Saturn gamepad was found to be insufficient to control Nights in flight, so the team developed the Saturn analog controller. It took about six months to develop, and the team went through many ideas for alternate controllers, including one shaped like a Nights doll.

Iizuka said Nights was inspired by anime and Cirque du Soleil's Mystère theatrical performance. The team researched dream sequences and REM sleep, including the works of psychoanalysts Carl Jung, Sigmund Freud and Friedrich Holtz. Iizuka studied dreams and theories about them, such as Jung's theories of dream archetypes. Naka said that Nights reflected Jung's analytical "shadow" theory, whereas Claris and Elliot were inspired by Jung's animus and anima.

== Release ==
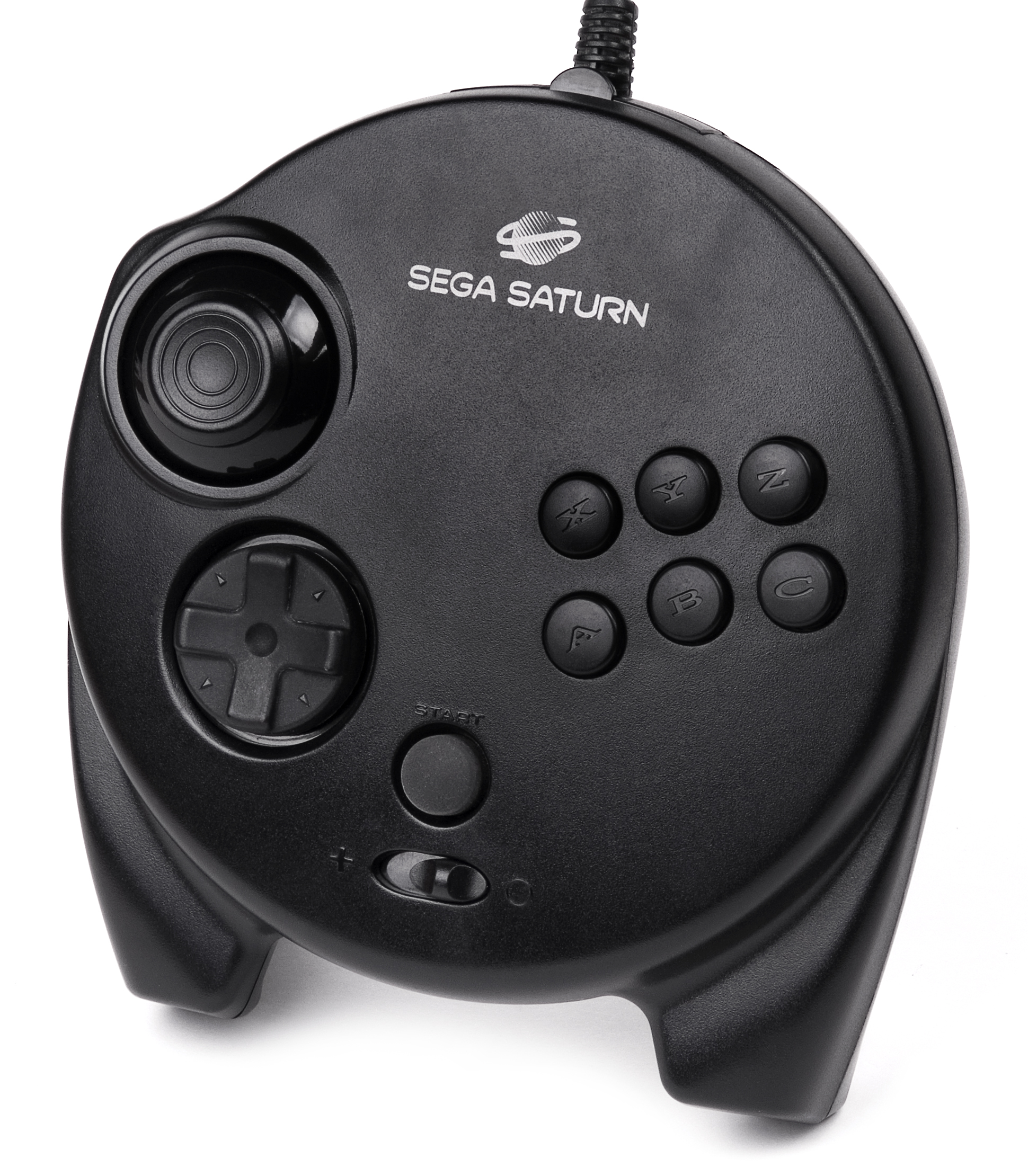
The optional 3D controller that was packaged with Nights into Dreams

Nights into Dreams was introduced alongside an optional gamepad, the Saturn 3D controller, included with some copies. It features an analogue stick and analogue triggers designed for Nights to make movement easier. Sonic Team noted the successful twinning of the Nintendo 64 controller with Super Mario 64 (1996), and realised that the default Saturn controller was better suited to arcade games than Nights into Dreams. During development, the director Steven Spielberg visited the Sonic Team studio and became the first person outside the team to play the game. Naka asked him to use an experimental version of the Saturn 3D controller, and it was jokingly referred to as the "Spielberg controller" throughout development.

Because the Nights character was testing very young in focus groups, Sega used a nighttime scene for the cover art to create a more mature look. Fearing the game would appeal to too young a demographic in the West, Sega of America considered altering it to better appeal to the older Saturn demographic, though these plans never materialized. Nights was marketed with a budget of $10 million, which included television and print advertisements in the United States. In Germany, Sega launched a television advertising campaign for Nights into Dreams in September 1996. Sega Magazin reported that numerous commercials would air on RTL, ProSieben and Sat.1, with the campaign focusing exclusively on the game. In the US, it was advertised with the slogan "Prepare to fly".

== Related games ==
=== Christmas Nights ===
Christmas Nights into Dreams... (Note: Christmas Nights (クリスマスナイツ, Kurisumasu Naitsu)) is a short Christmas-themed version of Nights into Dreams released in December 1996. Iizuka stated that Christmas Nights was created to increase Saturn sales. Development began in July 1996 and took three to four months, according to Naka. Designer Takao Miyoshi recalled working "in the peak of summer ... holed up at the office listening to 'Jingle Bells'".

In Japan, Christmas Nights was included as part of a Christmas Sega Saturn bundle and distributed free to Saturn owners who covered the shipping cost. Elsewhere, it was given away with the purchase of Saturn games such as Daytona USA: Championship Circuit Edition (1996) or issues of Sega Saturn Magazine and Next Generation Magazine. In Sweden, Super Play reported in December 1996 that Christmas Nights would be included with all new Sega Saturn consoles sold during the Christmas shopping season. In the United Kingdom, Christmas Nights was not included with Sega Saturn Magazine until December 1997.

Christmas Nights follows Elliot and Claris during the holiday season following their adventures with Nights. Realizing that the Christmas Star is missing from the Twin Seeds Christmas tree, the pair travel to Nightopia to find it, where they reunite with Nights and retrieve the Christmas Star from Gillwing's lair.

Christmas Nights features Christmas-themed levels.

Christmas Nights contains the full version of Claris' Spring Valley dream level from Nights into Dreams, playable as both Claris and Elliot. The Saturn's internal clock changes elements according to the date and time: December activates "Christmas Nights" mode, replacing item boxes with Christmas presents, greenery with snow and gumdrops, rings with wreaths, and Ideya captures with Christmas trees; Nightopians wear elf costumes, and the music is replaced with a rendition of "Jingle Bells" and an a cappella version of the Nights theme song. During the "Winter Nights" period, the Spring Valley weather changes according to the hour. Other changes apply on New Year's Day, Valentine's Day, April Fool's Day, Halloween, Christmas Day, and 31 December 2099; on April Fool's Day, Reala replaces Nights as the playable character.

Nights features several unlockable bonuses, such as being able to play the soundtrack, observe the status of the A-life system, experiment with the music mixer, time attack one Mare, or play as Sega's mascot Sonic the Hedgehog in the minigame Sonic the Hedgehog: Into Dreams. Sonic may only play through Spring Valley on foot, and must defeat the boss: an inflatable Dr. Robotnik. This is Sonic's first appearance on the Saturn. The music is a remixed version of "Final Fever", the final boss battle music from the Japanese and European version of Sonic CD (1993). In the HD version of Nights, the Christmas Nights content is playable after the game has been cleared once.

=== Sequel ===
Sonic Team made a prototype sequel with the title Air Nights for the Saturn, and began development for the Dreamcast. In August 1999, Naka confirmed that a sequel was in development; by December 2000, however, it had been cancelled. Naka expressed reluctance to develop a sequel, but later said he was interested in using Nights into Dreams "to reinforce Sega's identity". A handheld electronic Nights game was released by Tiger Electronics.

A sequel, Nights: Journey of Dreams, was announced for the Wii in April 2007. It was first previewed on Portuguese publication Maxi Consolas, after the release of short reveals from the Official Nintendo Magazine and Game Reactor. It is a Wii exclusive, making use of the Wii Remote. The gameplay involves the use of various masks, and features a multiplayer mode for two players in addition to Nintendo Wi-Fi Connection online functions. Journey of Dreams was developed by Sega Studio USA, with Iizuka, one of the designers of the original game, serving as producer. It was released in Japan and the United States in December 2007, and in Europe and Australia in January 2008. In 2010, Iizuka said that he would be interested in making a third Nights into Dreams game.

== Reception ==
=== Commercial ===
In Japan, Nights into Dreams topped the Japanese all-format games chart, despite increased competition from the newly launched Nintendo 64. It was the best-selling Sega Saturn game and the 21st best-selling game of 1996, with 392,383 copies sold. By November 1997, Sega Saturn Magazine estimated that the game had sold 503,376 copies in Japan, ranking it eighth among the Saturn's best-selling titles. The PS2 version sold 6,828 units in Japan. In the US, Nights into Dreams was reported to sell out at several different retail outlets, and was one of the system's top sellers in the Christmas 1996 season. In the UK, Nights into Dreams was one of the best-selling Sega Saturn games of 1996. In France, the Nights into Dreams bundle with the 3D Control Pad topped Player One's Saturn sales chart for August 1996. In Germany, Nights into Dreams topped the Sega Saturn sales charts published by Media Control in November and December 1996. In Spain, Nights into Dreams topped the Sega Saturn chart published by Hobby Consolas in October and November 1996. In Australia, Nights into Dreams topped the Sega Saturn sales charts published in the December 1996 and January 1997 issues of Hyper, based on retail rankings supplied by Hitech World. In South Korea, Game Champ reported that Nights into Dreams had achieved the highest sales among officially imported Sega Saturn games in the country. In Brazil, Nights into Dreams was TecToy's sixth-best-selling Sega Saturn game.

=== Critical ===
Reception

Aggregate score
Aggregator	Score
GameRankings	89% (Note: Based on 9 reviews)

Review scores
Publication	Score
Computer and Video Games	5/5
Edge	8/10
Electronic Gaming Monthly	8/10
Eurogamer	9/10 (XBLA)
Famitsu	8/10, 9/10, 9/10, 8/10
Game Informer	8.5/10
GameFan	387/400
GameRevolution	A
IGN	8.7/10
Next Generation	5/5
Entertainment Weekly	A
Mean Machines Sega	96%
Sega Saturn Magazine (UK)	96%
Sega Saturn Magazine (Japan)	9.8/10
Saturn Fan	8.4/10

Award
Publication	Award
Japan Game Awards	Best Graphics, Best Programming

Nights into Dreams received critical acclaim, holding an average score of 89 percent at GameRankings, based on an aggregate of nine reviews. Upon release, Computer and Video Games magazine called it "one of the most sensational video games EVER made!"

The graphics and flight mechanics were the most praised aspects. Tom Guise of Computer and Video Games said the flight system and freedom were captivating and that Nights into Dreams was the "perfect evolution" of a Sonic game. Scary Larry of GamePro said flying using the analogue joystick "is a breeze" and that the gameplay is fun, enjoyable, and impressive. He gave it a 4.5 out of 5 for graphics and a 5 out of 5 in every other category (sound, control, and FunFactor). Entertainment Weekly said its "graceful acrobatic stunts" offer "a more compelling sensation of soaring than most flight simulators". Edge praised the analogue controller and called the levels "well-designed and graphically unrivaled", but the reviewer expressed disappointment in the limited level count compared to Super Mario 64, and suggested that Nights seemed to prioritise technical achievements and Saturn selling points over gameplay with as clear a focus as Sonic. Martin Robinson from Eurogamer opined that the flight mechanics were a "giddy thrill". Colin Ferris from Game Revolution praised the graphics and speed as breathtaking and awe-inspiring, concluding that it offered the best qualities of the fifth-generation machines. GameFan praised the combination of "lush graphics, amazing music, and totally unique gameplay". Next Generation criticised the speed, saying that the only disappointing aspect was the way "it all rushes by so fast", but the magazine praised the two-player mode and the innovative method of grading the player once they completed a level. Electronic Gaming Monthly's four reviewers were impressed with both the technical aspects and style of the graphics, and said the levels are great fun to explore, though they expressed disappointment that the game was not genuinely 3D and said it did not surpass Super Mario 64.

Levi Buchanan from IGN believed that the console "was not built to handle Nights" due to the occasional clipping and warping, though he said the graphics were "pretty darn good". A reviewer from Mean Machines Sega praised the vibrant colours and detailed textures, and described its animation as being "fluid as water". The reviewer also noted occasional pop-in and glitching. Rad Automatic from the British Sega Saturn Magazine praised the visuals and colour scheme as rich in both texture and detail, while suggesting that Nights into Dreams is "one of the most captivating games the Saturn has witnessed yet". Next Generation said the visuals were "beyond a doubt" the most fluid and satisfying for any game on any system. Upon release, the Japanese Sega Saturn Magazine wrote that Nights would have a significant impact on the video game industry, particularly the action game genre. The reviewer also said Nights felt better through with the analogue pad, in contrast to the conventional controller, and also praised the light and smooth feeling the analogue pad portrayed during gameplay.

Reviewers also praised the soundtrack and audio effects. Paul Davies from Computer and Video Games said Nights had "the best music ever"; in the same review, Tom Guise said it created a hypnotically magical atmosphere. Ferris said that the music and sound effects were that of a dream world, and asserted that they were fitting for a game like Nights into Dreams. IGN's Buchanan praised the soundtrack and that the sound effects "fit in perfectly with the dream universe".

=== Accolades ===
Nights into Dreams received the "Best Graphics" and "Best Programming" awards at the Japan Game Awards. In Electronic Gaming Monthly's "Best of '96" awards, it was a runner-up for Flying Game of the Year (behind Pilotwings 64), Nights was a runner-up for "coolest mascot" (behind Mario), and the Saturn analog controller, which the magazine called the "Nights Controller", won Best Peripheral. The following year EGM ranked it the 70th best console video game of all time, describing it as "unlike anything you've seen before ... a 2.5-D platform game without the platforms".

== Legacy and adaptations ==
Nights into Dreams has appeared on several best-game-of-all-time lists. In a January 2000 poll by Computer and Video Games, readers named it the 15th greatest game, behind Super Mario 64. IGN ranked it the 94th best game of all time in 2007, and in 2008, Levi Buchanan ranked it fourth in his list of the top 10 Sega Saturn games. Next Generation ranked it the 25th best game in their September 1996 issue (one month before they reviewed the game, and roughly two months before it saw release outside Japan). 1UP ranked it third in its "Top Ten Cult Classics" list. In 2014, GamesRadar listed Nights into Dreams as the best Sega Saturn game of all time, saying it "tapped into a new kind of platform gameplay for its era". In Spain, Hobby Consolas subsequently ranked NiGHTS into Dreams third on its list of the twenty best Sega Saturn games, and in a retrospective on the 1996–97 console market, the magazine cited NiGHTS and Panzer Dragoon among the Saturn exclusives that helped make the console one of the more attractive platforms of the period. Naka said that the release of Nights was when Sonic Team was truly formed as a brand. The game's A-Life system also influenced Sonic Team's later work. Takashi Iizuka stated that he developed the Chao Garden in Sonic Adventure by applying the A-Life concept from Nights into Dreams to the Sonic series, with the aim of encouraging players to repeatedly revisit action stages. Retro Gamer later described the Chao Garden as a major expansion of the A-Life system introduced in Nights.

The Saturn 3D Control Pad developed alongside Nights into Dreams has also been cited as influential on subsequent console controllers. In a retrospective on Sega's hardware innovations, GamesRadar noted similarities between the controller and the later Dreamcast, GameCube and Xbox controllers, particularly its analogue stick and analogue shoulder triggers.

=== Remakes ===
Sega released a remake of Nights into Dreams for the PlayStation 2 exclusively in Japan on 21 February 2008. It includes 16:9 wide screen support, an illustration gallery and an option to use classic Saturn graphics. It was also featured in a bundle named the Nightopia Dream Pack, which includes a reprint of a picture book that was released in Japan alongside the original Saturn game. A Nights into Dreams handheld electronic game was released by Tiger Electronics in 1997, and a port of it was later released for Tiger's unsuccessful R-Zone console.

A high-definition remaster of the PlayStation 2 version was released for PlayStation Network and Xbox Live Arcade in October 2012. A Windows version was released via Steam on in December 2012, with online score leaderboards and the option to play with enhanced graphics or with the original Saturn graphics. The HD version also includes Christmas Nights, but the two-player mode and Sonic the Hedgehog level were removed.

In December 2024, Sega delisted the digital version of Nights into Dreams from new purchase on Steam and Xbox as part of a wider delisting of legacy Sega titles; customers who had previously purchased the game retained access to it.

=== In other media ===
Claris and Elliot appear in Sonic Team's Burning Rangers (1998). Nights-themed pinball areas feature in Sonic Adventure (1998) and Sonic Pinball Party (2003). The PlayStation 2 games EyeToy: Play (2003) and Sega SuperStars (2004) both feature minigames based on Nights into Dreams, in which Nights is controlled using the player's body.

A minigame version of Nights into Dreams is playable through using the Nintendo GameCube – Game Boy Advance link cable connectivity with Phantasy Star Online Episode I & II (2002) and Billy Hatcher and the Giant Egg (2003). Sonic & All-Stars Racing Transformed features a Nights into Dreams-themed racetrack. The limited Deadly Six edition of Sonic Lost World (2013) features a Nights into Dreams-inspired stage, "Nightmare Zone", as downloadable content.

In February 1998, Nights into Dreams was adapted into a three-issue comic book miniseries published by Archie Comics. to test whether a Nights comic would sell well in North America. The miniseries was loosely based on the game, with Nights identified as male despite the character's androgynous design. The company later released a second three-issue miniseries, continuing the story of the first, but the series did not gain enough sales to warrant an ongoing series. It was later added to a list of guest franchises featured in Archie Comics' Worlds Unite crossover between its Sonic the Hedgehog and Mega Man comics.
