= Sonic & Knuckles =

1994 video game

- North American Genesis box art
- Developer: Sega Technical Institute
- Publisher: Sega
- Director: Hirokazu Yasuhara
- Producer: Yuji Naka
- Designers: Hirokazu Yasuhara; Hisayoshi Yoshida; Takashi Iizuka
- Programmers: Yuji Naka; Takahiro Hamano; Masanobu Yamamoto
- Artists: Takashi Yuda; Satoshi Yokokawa
- Composers: Howard Drossin; Masanori Hikichi; Sachio Ogawa; Tatsuyuki Maeda; Jun Senoue
- Series: Sonic the Hedgehog
- Platforms: Sega Genesis, Windows
- Release: Genesis; WW: October 18, 1994; Windows; JP: February 14, 1997; NA: March 14, 1997; EU: March 20, 1997
- Genre: Platform
- Mode: Single-player

Sonic & Knuckles (Note: Japanese: ソニック&(アンド)ナックルズ, Hepburn: Sonikku ando Nakkuruzu) is a 1994 platform game developed by Sega Technical Institute and published by Sega for the Sega Genesis. Players control Sonic the Hedgehog or Knuckles the Echidna in their quests to save Angel Island; Sonic tries to stop Doctor Robotnik from re-launching his orbital weapon, the Death Egg, while Knuckles scuffles with Robotnik's minion, EggRobo. Like previous Sonic games, players traverse side-scrolling levels at high speeds while collecting rings and defeating enemies.

Sega Technical Institute developed Sonic & Knuckles simultaneously alongside its predecessor, Sonic the Hedgehog 3 (1994); they were planned as a single game until time constraints and cartridge costs forced the developers to split it. The Sonic & Knuckles cartridge features an adapter that allows players to connect the Sonic the Hedgehog 3 cartridge, creating a combined game, Sonic 3 & Knuckles. Sonic the Hedgehog 2 (1992) can also be attached, allowing players to control Knuckles in Sonic 2 stages. Attaching the original Sonic the Hedgehog or any other Genesis game released prior to this will unlock the "Blue Sphere" minigame.

Sonic & Knuckles was released for the Sega Genesis worldwide on October 18, 1994. It received positive reviews; critics were impressed with the replay value and lock-on technology, despite its similarity to Sonic 3. The games sold a combined four million copies worldwide, placing them among the best-selling Sega Genesis games. They have since been rereleased in various Sega and Sonic compilations.

== Gameplay ==
Knuckles explores Mushroom Hill, the first zone of Sonic & Knuckles.

Since Sonic & Knuckles and Sonic the Hedgehog 3 were initially developed as one game, their gameplay is similar: both are 2D side-scrolling platformers with similar level design, graphics, and game mechanics. However, in Sonic & Knuckles, unlike in Sonic 3, the player chooses either Sonic or Knuckles at the title screen, Miles "Tails" Prower is not available to select, and the player cannot control two characters together. There is also no multiplayer mode or save feature.

The player character moves through six levels, each divided into two acts. The first act of each level ends with a miniboss fight with one of Dr. Robotnik's robots, while the second ends with a regular boss fight with Robotnik (or EggRobo in Knuckles's campaign). Sonic and Knuckles traverse levels differently; Sonic can jump higher and has access to unique shield abilities, whereas Knuckles can glide and climb most walls. The levels also include cutscenes that differ based on the character selected, as Sonic and Knuckles are opponents for most of the game.

The game contains two types of bonus stages accessed by passing a checkpoint with at least 20 rings. The first type has Sonic or Knuckles orbit floating, glowing spheres, jetting off each one when a button is pressed, while a fence of light approaches from the bottom and will remove the player from the stage if touched. Collecting 50 rings in this stage earns the player a continue. The second type involves bouncing around a room with a slot machine in its center with the intention of winning extra lives and power-ups.

Special Stages are entered by finding giant rings hidden in secret passageways: the player is placed in a 3D environment and must turn all of a number of blue spheres red by running through them, but must avoid all red spheres, including formerly blue ones. Yellow spheres bounce the player long distances, and white spheres with red stars on them make the player walk backward in the opposite direction. Completing a Special Stage earns the player a Chaos Emerald; collecting all seven Emeralds allows the player to turn into Super Sonic or Super Knuckles, more powerful versions of the characters, and in Sonic's case, give him access to an extra boss fight and post-credits scene.

=== Lock-on technology ===
Sonic & Knuckles features "lock-on technology" that allows players to open the hatch on the cartridge and insert a second cartridge. When Sonic 3 is inserted, the player can play through both games as one, Sonic 3 & Knuckles. This features several changes to the games, such as slightly altered level layouts, the ability to play through Sonic 3 levels as Knuckles or Sonic & Knuckles levels as Tails, and the ability to save progress in Sonic & Knuckles levels. Additionally, combining the cartridges is the only way to collect "Super Emeralds", earned by accessing Special Stages in the Sonic & Knuckles levels after collecting all seven Chaos Emeralds from Sonic 3. When all Super Emeralds have been collected, Sonic, Knuckles, and Tails can transform into Hyper Sonic, Hyper Knuckles, and Super Tails, (Note: Several years later, with the re-release of Sonic 3 & Knuckles in Sonic Origins, this transformation would be referred to as Hyper Tails, now having another version of Super Tails that is unlocked by collecting all seven Chaos Emeralds.) each with unique abilities.

Inserting Sonic 2 unlocks Knuckles the Echidna in Sonic the Hedgehog 2, wherein the player can play Sonic 2 using Knuckles's abilities. If the player attaches any other Genesis game released prior to Sonic & Knuckles, a screen with Sonic, Tails, Knuckles, and Robotnik stating "No Way!" is displayed. From here, the player can also access a minigame based on Sonic 3's and Sonic & Knuckles's Chaos Emerald Special Stages. The attached cartridge determines the Special Stage layout. If the player attaches the original Sonic the Hedgehog, they are able to access all of the possible variations of the special stages, each with a unique level number and corresponding password. This game is named Blue Sphere in Sonic Mega Collection.

== Plot ==
After the events of Sonic 3, Dr. Robotnik's orbital weapon, the Death Egg, crash-lands on Angel Island. Sonic travels to Angel Island to retrieve the Chaos Emeralds to defeat Robotnik, and once again comes into conflict with Knuckles, who believes Sonic is trying to steal the Emeralds for himself. In Hidden Palace Zone, Sonic fights and defeats Knuckles, only to discover Robotnik stealing the Master Emerald, the secret to the island's levitation powers. Knuckles attacks Robotnik, but Robotnik shocks him with electricity. Knuckles shows Sonic a portal that leads them to Sky Sanctuary, where the Death Egg is relaunching. Sonic infiltrates the Death Egg and defeats Robotnik as Super Sonic, retrieving the Master Emerald and returning it to Angel Island as it rises back into the sky.

In Knuckles's story, taking place after Sonic's, Knuckles is attacked by EggRobo, one of Robotnik's robots. He chases him to the damaged remains of Sky Sanctuary, where Mecha Sonic attacks Knuckles, but accidentally destroys EggRobo instead. Mecha Sonic uses the power of the Master Emerald to achieve a Super form similar to Sonic's and fights Knuckles until the latter eventually defeats the mecha. Sonic flies in piloting the biplane Tornado, and takes Knuckles and the Master Emerald back to Angel Island. If all the Chaos Emeralds are collected, Angel Island rises upwards, into the sky. However, if the player has not collected all the Chaos Emeralds, Angel Island plummets into the ocean.

== Development ==
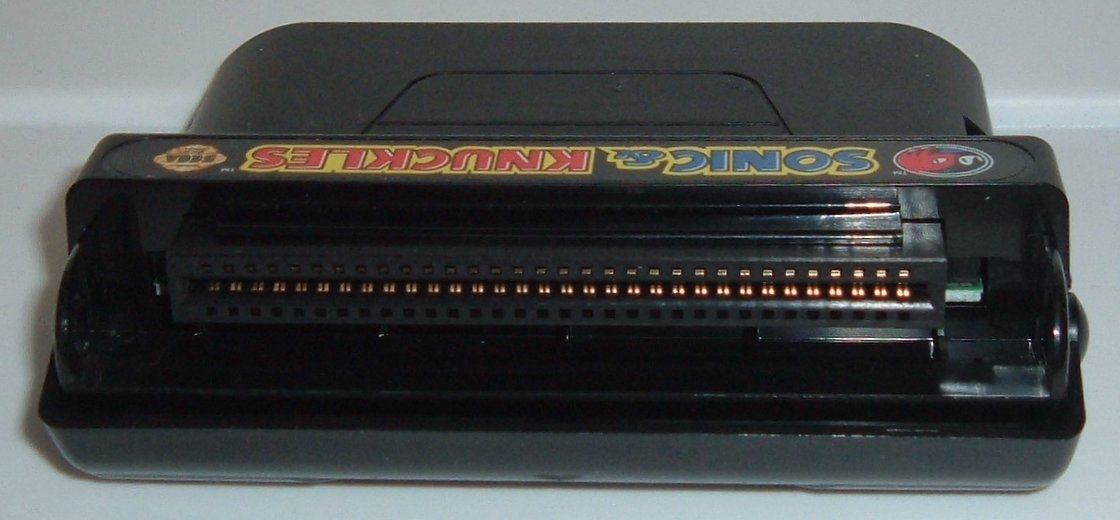
The Sonic & Knuckles cartridge features a "lock-on" adapter that allows it to be physically attached to other Genesis cartridges.

Sonic & Knuckles was developed in California by the Japanese members of Sega Technical Institute (STI). Sonic 3 and Sonic & Knuckles were originally planned as a single game; according to designer Takashi Iizuka, the team "really wanted to hit a home run", with larger stages that took longer to develop. As ROM cartridges were too small to contain the game and Sega wanted it released in time for a promotional deal with McDonald's in the US, Sonic 3 was split in two, with Sonic & Knuckles as the second part. As Mushroom Hill became the first stage of Sonic & Knuckles, the developers lowered its difficulty.

Despite the split, the developers wanted the games to feel like a single experience. According to Roger Hector, vice president and general manager of STI, the lock-on technology was conceived between the releases of Sonic the Hedgehog (1991) and Sonic the Hedgehog 2 (1992).

The team explained their situation to Sega's hardware division, which gave them the lock-on adapter. The team knew that players would likely use the adapter to insert games beside Sonic 3, so they implemented the Blue Sphere minigame for most games. They made Knuckles playable in Sonic 2 if that game was inserted because the team found his play style suited its levels. They considered including the same functionality for the original Sonic the Hedgehog, but the developers felt Knuckles's abilities did not work with its level design.

== Release ==
Sonic & Knuckles was released worldwide on October 18, 1994. It was released around the same time as Nintendo's Donkey Kong Country for the Genesis's competitor, the Super Nintendo Entertainment System. Industry figures called the coinciding releases a "battle" as both advertised "revolutionary" technological advances: lock-on technology for Sonic & Knuckles and 3D-rendered graphics for Donkey Kong.

Sonic & Knuckles was backed by a $45 million marketing campaign; at the time, video games typically had a marketing budget of $5 million. Blockbuster Video and MTV co-sponsored a tournament in which people were allowed to play Sonic & Knuckles. The final tournament was held at Alcatraz Island in San Francisco, California, with a prize of $25,000 and the title "The World's Most Hardcore Gamer". Two finalists were also awarded a copy of every Sega product released for the next year. MTV broadcast the tournament finale along with footage of the game as MTV's Rock the Rock.

== Rereleases ==
Sonic & Knuckles is included in the compilations Sonic & Knuckles Collection (1997) for Windows, Sonic Jam (1997) for the Sega Saturn, Sonic Mega Collection (2002) for the GameCube, Sonic Mega Collection Plus (2004) for the PlayStation 2, Xbox, and Windows, Sonic's Ultimate Genesis Collection (2009) for the Xbox 360 and PlayStation 3, and Sonic Classic Collection (2010) for the Nintendo DS. The Sonic Jam version introduces "remix" options: "Normal" mode alters the layout of rings and hazards, and "Easy" mode removes certain acts. The version in Sonic's Ultimate Genesis Collection does not retain the lock-on feature included in other versions of the game, because of "tight development times".

The game has been re-released through the Wii's Virtual Console and Xbox 360's Xbox Live Arcade. Both releases are programmed such that, if any of the "Lock-on" games are also downloaded on the same account, the "connected" versions of the game are also available. For example, if one downloads Sonic & Knuckles and Sonic 2, they have the option to play the corresponding Knuckles in Sonic 2 game. A PC version was released via Steam in January 2011, as Sonic 3 & Knuckles but later delisted as well as the other classic titles when Sonic Origins released.

Sonic & Knuckles is included in the retro console Sega Genesis Flashback released in 2017 by AtGames, a compilation of 45 Genesis games that does not have Sonic 3.

Sonic 3 & Knuckles was re-released for the first time since 2011 as part of the Sonic Origins compilation in 2022. All versions of the games included in Origins are remakes running on the Retro Engine, with Sonic 1, 2, and CD being new ports of existing remakes. This version of the title was developed by Simon Thomley of Headcannon, who previously worked on both Sonic Mania and the other titles included. The Origins version features the original "Blue Sphere" minigame as a bonus mode, as well as new iteration of the mode called "New Blue Spheres" which includes the additional sphere colors introduced in Sonic Mania.

== Reception ==
Reception

Review scores
Publication	Score
AllGame	3.5/5
Computer and Video Games	97%
Electronic Gaming Monthly	10/10, 9/10, 9/10, 9/10
Famitsu	8/10, 8/10, 8/10, 6/10
Game Informer	8.25/10
IGN	9/10
Next Generation	4/5
Nintendo Life	8/10
Sega Magazine	92%
Sega Power	90%

Award
Publication	Award
VideoGames	Best Genesis Game (runner-up)

The Genesis version sold at least 1.24 million copies in the United States. Sonic 3 and Sonic & Knuckles sold a combined 4 million cartridges worldwide.

Critics praised Sonic & Knuckles, despite its similarity to its predecessor. The four reviewers of Electronic Gaming Monthly named it their "Game of the Month". They lauded the lock-on technology and remarked that despite that being "more of the same, it still is an exceptional game". GamePro commented that the ability to play as Knuckles makes it essentially two games on a single cartridge, the game is more challenging than Sonic 3, and the ability to hook the cartridge up to Sonic 2 and 3 makes those games "worth playing again". They gave it a perfect 5.0 out of 5 in all four categories (graphics, sound, control, and funfactor). Next Generation remarked, "Basically, this is the same Sonic game that Sega has sold for the last three years, just wrapped up better and with a prettier ribbon."

Critics praised the lock-on technology the game offered. Lucas Thomas of IGN said it was "a great game on its own", but the lock-on feature completely revamped the overall experience. Dan Whitehead of Eurogamer preferred Sonic & Knuckles to Sonic 3, stating that he could not fully appreciate its predecessor without its "companion piece". Sega Power's review praised the game's harder difficulty in comparison to its predecessor and the new expansion of levels, admitting that the expansion would not have been possible had Sonic 3 been a single game. Sega Magazine's review similarly praised the lock-on technology and the new innovation the unique cartridge offered, adding that Sonic & Knuckles's hidden stages and bosses would strongly add to the replay value of the combined game.

Reviewing the Virtual Console release, Nintendo Life writer James Newton praised its support for the old lock-on feature of the original release, claiming that the game does not truly shine without having purchased Sonic the Hedgehog 2 and 3 to activate this feature. Thomas praised the game for "impressive visuals that pushed the Genesis to its limits" and for the value added in the content unlocked with the lock-on technology.

== Legacy ==
For the series' twentieth anniversary in 2011, Sega released Sonic Generations, a game that remade aspects of various past games from the franchise. A remake of the Sky Sanctuary stage was made for the Xbox 360, PlayStation 3, and PC versions of the game, while the Mushroom Hill level was remade for the Nintendo 3DS version of the game. Sonic & Sega All-Stars Racing features a track inspired by the Death Egg as downloadable content along with the Metal Sonic character. The sequel, Sonic & All-Stars Racing Transformed, featured the same race course, and an additional new one inspired by the Sky Sanctuary stage. Re-imagined versions of the Flying Battery and Lava Reef stages, along with the Blue Sphere bonus game, appear in the 2017 game Sonic Mania. The 2022 Sonic the Hedgehog 2 movie draws inspiration from Sonic & Knuckles, though it is not a direct adaptation.

In 2022, 30 years after the release of the game, Paramount Pictures announced the release of the film Sonic the Hedgehog 3 in December 2024, as well as the release of Knuckles on Paramount+ in April of that year; the creative team behind the live-action franchise confirmed this was meant to be an homage to the Sonic the Hedgehog 3/Sonic & Knuckles double-feature.
