= Sonic X-treme =

Canceled video game by Sega

- Conceptual box art
- Developer: Sega Technical Institute
- Publisher: Sega
- Producer: Mike Wallis
- Designers: Chris Senn; Richard Wheeler; Jason Kuo
- Programmers: Chris Coffin; Ofer Alon
- Artists: Ross Harris; Fei Cheng; Andrew Probert
- Composer: Howard Drossin
- Series: Sonic the Hedgehog
- Platforms: Sega Saturn; Windows
- Release: Cancelled
- Genre: Platform
- Mode: Single-player

Sonic X-treme was a platform game developed by Sega Technical Institute from 1994 until its cancellation in 1996. It was planned as the first fully 3D Sonic the Hedgehog game, taking Sonic into the 3D era of video games, and the first original Sonic game for the Sega Saturn. The storyline followed Sonic on his journey to stop Doctor Robotnik from stealing six magic rings from Tiara Boobowski and her father. X-treme featured open levels rotating around a fixed center of gravity and, like previous Sonic games, featured collectible rings and fast-paced gameplay.

X-treme was conceived as a side-scrolling platform game for the Sega Genesis to succeed Sonic & Knuckles (1994). Development shifted to the 32X and then the Saturn and Windows, and the game was redesigned as a 3D platform game for the 1996 holiday season. The plan was disrupted by company politics, an unfavorable visit by Japanese Sega executives, and obstacles with the game engines planned for use, including one from Sonic Team for Nights into Dreams (1996). Amid increasing pressure and declining morale, designer Chris Senn and programmer Chris Coffin became ill, prompting producer Mike Wallis to cancel the game. A film tie-in with Metro-Goldwyn-Mayer was also canceled.

In place of X-treme, Sega released a port of the Genesis game Sonic 3D Blast, but did not release an original 3D Sonic platform game until Sonic Adventure for the Dreamcast in 1998. X-treme is regarded as the most famous canceled Sonic game, and journalists and fans have speculated about its potential. Its cancellation is considered an important factor in the Saturn's commercial failure outside of Japan, as it left the system with no original Sonic platform game. Elements similar to those in X-treme appeared in later games, such as Sonic Lost World (2013).

== Premise ==
"Jade Gully Zone" from Senn and Alon's engine, which used a fish-eye style view known as the "Reflex Lens"

Sonic X-treme was a platform game in which players controlled Sonic the Hedgehog from a third-person perspective. It would have been the first Sonic the Hedgehog game to feature 3D gameplay, predating Sonic Adventure (1998). Gameplay was similar to the Sega Saturn platform game Bug! (1995), though producer Mike Wallis said that X-treme differed in that Sonic was free to roam levels, unconstrained by linear paths.

X-treme featured a fisheye camera system, the "Reflex Lens", that gave players a wide-angle view, making levels appear to move around Sonic. Levels would rotate around a fixed center of gravity, meaning Sonic could run up walls, arriving at what was previously the ceiling. Sonic was also able to enter and exit the screen as he moved. Boss battles were set in open, arena-style levels, and the bosses were rendered in polygons instead of sprites. These levels used shading, transparency, and lighting effects to showcase the Saturn's technical potential.

The developers wanted to take Sonic into the 3D era while building on its successes. In 1996, Wallis said X-treme featured familiar Sonic gameplay, but "[w]e're giving Sonic new moves, because Sonic is a hedgehog of the times, we're bringing him up to speed." Like previous Sonic games, X-treme emphasized speed and physics, and featured special stages and collectable rings. Additions included the abilities to throw rings at enemies, create a shield from rings, do spinning midair attacks, strike enemies below with a "Power Ball" attack, jump higher with less control than normal, and execute a "Sonic Boom" attack, in concert with the shield, that struck in 360 degrees. Surfing and bungee jumping were included as activities considered cool at the time.

Former executive producer Michael Kosaka's design documents envisioned six zones with three levels each. At least four stages were developed before cancellation: Jade Gully, Red Sands, Galaxy Fortress, and Crystal Frost. Lead designer Chris Senn said he modeled and textured four main characters and created designs for 50 enemies and an hour of music. The plot went through several iterations; the one described in promotional materials involved Tiara Boobowski, who was set to become a major character, and her father, Professor Gazebo Boobowski, calling on Sonic to help defend the six magical Rings of Order from Doctor Robotnik. Another new character who appeared in story pitches was Chaos, a monster trapped inside the Master Emerald. Fang the Sniper and Metal Sonic were planned as bosses.

== Background ==
The original Sonic the Hedgehog was developed by Sonic Team in Japan. Released in 1991, it greatly increased the popularity of the Sega Genesis in North America. After its release, developer Yuji Naka and other Japanese staff relocated to California to join Sega Technical Institute (STI), a development division led by Mark Cerny. Cerny aimed to establish an elite development studio combining the design philosophies of American and Japanese developers.

In 1991, STI began developing several games, including Sonic the Hedgehog 2 (1992), which was released the following year. Though Sonic the Hedgehog 2 was successful, the language barrier and cultural differences created a rift between the Japanese and American developers. Once development ended, Cerny departed STI and was replaced by former Atari employee Roger Hector. The American staff developed Sonic Spinball (1993), while the Japanese staff developed Sonic the Hedgehog 3 (1994) and Sonic & Knuckles (1994). According to developer Takashi Iizuka, the Japanese team experimented with 3D computer graphics for Sonic 3, but were unable to implement them with the limited power of the Genesis. After Sonic & Knuckles was completed, Naka returned to Japan to work on Nights into Dreams (1996) with Sonic Team.

At the time, Sega of America operated as an independent entity, and relations with the Japanese were not always smooth. Some of this conflict may have been caused by Sega president Hayao Nakayama and his admiration for Sega of America; according to former Sega of America CEO Tom Kalinske, some executives disliked that Nakayama appeared to favor US executives, and "a lot of the Japanese executives were maybe a little jealous, and I think some of that played into the decisions that were made". By contrast, author Steven L. Kent opined that Nakayama bullied American executives and believed the Japanese executives made the best decisions. According to Hector, after the release of the Sony PlayStation in 1994, the atmosphere at Sega became political, with "lots of finger-pointing".

== Development ==
After Naka's return to Japan with his team in late 1994, STI was left with mostly American staff. Development of Sonic X-treme began in late 1994 at STI. Michael Kosaka was executive producer and team leader, and designer and CGI artist Senn created animations to pitch the game to Sega executives. As new consoles and the 32-bit era were on the way, the game was moved to the 32X under the working titles Sonic 32X and Sonic Mars after the "Project Mars" codename used for the 32X. The initial 32X design was an isometric side-scroller, but became a full 3D game with a view set on a floating plane. Kosaka completed design documents before the 32X was released, without a clear picture of the hardware. Some of Kosaka's concepts were new dynamics to the gameplay, including the ability for a second player to play as a character other than Tails. Various playable characters, including some from the cartoon, would be unlocked as they were rescued and have unique moves. Players could also collect Chaos Emeralds via special stages that involved playing a minigame similar to air hockey against Dr. Robotnik, and collecting all seven would unlock the true ending.

In mid-1995, Kosaka resigned. According to Senn, "[Kosaka] and the executive producer Dean Lester were not getting along, and I believe Michael felt it was his best option to simply remove himself from what he thought was a politically unhealthy environment." Lester resigned later in 1995 and was replaced by Manny Granillo. Wallis, who had worked on The Ooze (1995) and Comix Zone (1995), was placed in charge of Sonic X-treme. Lead programmer Don Goddard was replaced with Ofer Alon, who some staff found difficult to work with, saying he did not share his work. As the design had changed significantly and the 32X struggled commercially, development moved to a planned Sega cartridge console powered by nVidia 3D hardware, designed to compete with the Nintendo 64. STI technical director Robert Morgan was instructed to explore this possibility, without hardware specifications or development kits. This decision was made because of the planned console's ability to handle 3D graphics and Sega of America senior management's disinterest in the Sega Saturn. After Sega announced that it would focus solely on the Saturn, development shifted again, costing the team several weeks.

When Naka visited STI and observed the X-treme development, he simply said "good luck". According to Senn, Naka was unsettled by STI's intention to make a fully 3D Sonic game for the Saturn, which he found too ambitious for the hardware. He believed the design would cause STI to abandon Sonic's simplicity. Senn recalled: "[Naka] dreaded the idea that his own creation could be completely altered. The 2D Sonic relied on simple, efficient, and fun gameplay. And he was convinced that using 3D might generate a whole lot of problems."

=== Design ===
Screenshot from Coffin's "boss engine", one of two engines used to develop Sonic X-treme. This version was displayed at E3 in May 1996.

The Saturn version was developed by two teams with two different game engines, starting in the second half of 1995. One team, led by Morgan and including programmer Chris Coffin, developed the free-roaming boss levels. This engine used tools used by Saturn games such as Panzer Dragoon II Zwei and rendered bosses as fully polygonal characters. The other team, led by Senn and Alon, developed the main levels, working on PC with the intent of porting their work to Saturn. Alon and Senn focused on building an editor to construct the main levels. Music and backgrounds could not be coded in the editor, and had to be coded manually for each level. Enemies were created as pre-rendered sprites. Senn lost 25 pounds and became severely ill from overworking on X-treme.

Other staff included composer Howard Drossin, lead artist Ross Harris, artist/designers Fei Cheng and Andrew Probert, and designers Jason Kuo and Richard Wheeler. Hirokazu Yasuhara, who designed the Genesis Sonic games, also contributed. According to Senn, his team was completely different from the STI teams led by Naka; this, combined with their inexperience, "set up seeds of doubt and a political landmine waiting to go off if we didn't produce amazing results quickly". Wallis expressed frustration with the team structure, and felt that internal politics hampered development. Coffin felt the division of responsibilities would ensure every element was perfect.

Difficulties arose from the design. According to Wallis, the game would combine 2D side-scrolling with "the ability to have [Sonic] go into and out of the screen", which created unexpected problems in implementation. Senn said a primary problem was transitioning Sonic's simple and fast controls to a 3D environment: "The simplicity of movement, particularly moving very quickly, was now gone. Seeing far enough into the distance, not getting stuck on obstacles, and trying to maintain that sense of free speed was very difficult." 3D graphics were new, and developers were still learning how they would affect controls and gameplay. Programming for the Saturn proved difficult; as Alon could not get his engine, developed on PC, to run fast enough on Saturn, Morgan outsourced the port to Point of View Software, a third-party company.

=== Disputes within Sega ===
"It was about as bad as I've seen. The politics that led to Kosaka-san's departure. Allowing a newbie wannabe designer like me to fill a veteran like Michael Kosaka's shoes without guidance and direction. Going through three lead programmers in the first year and a half of production, each time restarting the technology. A divide between people's ideas about what the game should be. Egos. Inexperience. Poor communication, bad politics… all of these things contributed to the inevitable demise of the project."

— Designer Chris Senn

In March 1996, Sega representatives from Japan visited STI to evaluate progress. At this point, X-treme was already behind schedule. Senn and other sources indicate that the key visitor was president Nakayama, though Wallis recalls executive vice president Shoichiro Irimajiri. The executive was unimpressed by Senn and Alon's work, as the version he saw, ported from PC to Saturn by Point of View, ran at a poor frame rate. Senn, who said the visitor "came storming out practically cursing after seeing what they'd done", and Alon attempted to show their most recent PC version, but he left before they had the opportunity.

The visitor was impressed by Coffin's boss engine, and requested that X-treme be reworked around it. Concerned about the need to create essentially a new game before the strict October 1996 deadline, Wallis isolated Coffin's team, preventing outside influence. The team comprised four artists, two programmers, a contractor, and three designers, set up in an old STI location. They worked between sixteen and twenty hours a day. Although neither Senn nor Alon were officially part of the production after the visit, they continued working on their version, hoping to pitch it to Sega as a PC game.

In April, Sega of America executive vice president Bernie Stolar approached STI and asked what he could do to help the game meet its deadline. At Wallis' suggestion, he provided the tools and source code for Sonic Team's 3D Saturn game Nights into Dreams. Naka was not included in the discussions and was upset to learn his tools were being used without permission. Two weeks later, Stolar requested that the team stop using the tools. Reports suggested that Naka had threatened to leave Sega if they were used. Senn dismissed this as speculation, but said that, if it were true, he understood Naka's interest in maintaining control over the Sonic Team technology and the Sonic franchise. Sonic Team was developing its own 3D Sonic game using the Nights engine, which could have motivated Naka's threat. The loss of the Nights engine cost the Sonic X-treme team weeks of development. In July 2022, Naka said the Nights engine would have been useless, as Nights was coded in assembly without documentation and X-treme was in C. He said he never heard that STI wanted to use it and suggested that the developers invented the story to rationalize their failure to finish X-treme.

=== Cancellation ===
In May 1996, Sega displayed a playable demo of X-treme at E3 in Los Angeles, and displayed a version of Coffin's engine. At this time, team morale had dropped and turnover was high. By August, Coffin had contracted severe walking pneumonia. Wallis praised Coffin's effort, but acknowledged that without Coffin the team had no chance of meeting its deadline. Around the same time, Senn became so ill that he was told he had six months to live, though he survived. With both teams crippled two months before the deadline, Wallis canceled the game.

Sega initially stated that X-treme had been delayed; however, in early 1997, Sega announced that the game had been canceled. For the 1996 holiday season, Sega instead concentrated on Sonic Team's Nights into Dreams and a port of the Genesis game Sonic 3D Blast by Traveller's Tales, to which Wallis contributed. Sonic Team's work on a Saturn 3D Sonic game became Sonic Adventure for the Dreamcast. Remnants of their prototype can be seen in the Saturn compilation game Sonic Jam (1997).

While Senn felt the version of X-treme he and Alon were developing could have been completed with an additional six to twelve months, Sega's PC division would not pay for its development, and may have been hesitant after the engine had been rejected for X-treme. After the project was rejected, Alon left Sega. Sega of America disbanded STI in 1996 following management changes. Hector believed that the success of PlayStation led to corporate turmoil within Sega that resulted in STI's dissolution. According to Wallis, STI was restructured as Sega of America's product development department after the previous product development department had become SegaSoft.

== Canceled film ==
In August 1994, Sega of America signed a deal with Metro-Goldwyn-Mayer and Trilogy Entertainment to produce a live-action animated film based on Sonic the Hedgehog and tie into Sonic X-treme. In May 1995, the screenwriter Richard Jeffries pitched a treatment titled Sonic: Wonders of the World. It had Sonic and Dr. Robotnik escaping from Sonic X-treme into the real world, where Sonic teams up with boy named Josh to stop Robotnik from stealing the wonders of the world. The film was canceled as the companies could not come to an agreement.

== Legacy ==
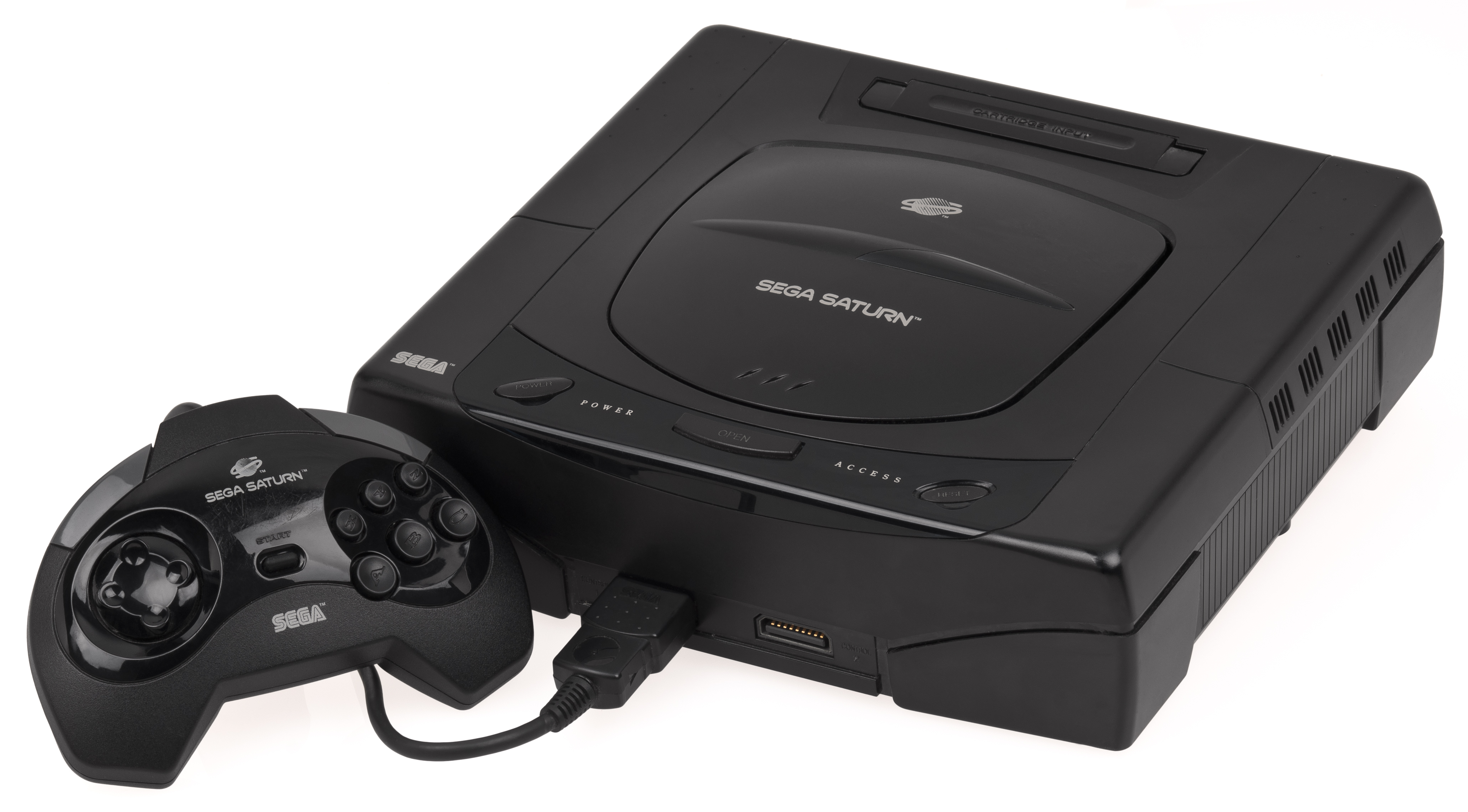
With X-treme's cancellation, the Sega Saturn had no original Sonic the Hedgehog platform game.

In place of Sonic X-treme, Sega released a port of the Genesis game Sonic 3D Blast, and Sonic Jam, a compilation of Genesis Sonic games with an additional 3D level. Sonic X-treme's cancellation is cited as a key reason for the Saturn's failure. While Sega controlled up to 55% of the console market in 1994, by August 1997, Sony controlled 47%, Nintendo 40%, and Sega only 12%.

X-treme is regarded as the most famous canceled Sonic game, and journalists and fans have speculated about its potential. David Houghton of GamesRadar+ described the prospect of "a good 3D Sonic game" on the Saturn as a "What if..." scenario akin to dinosaurs surviving extinction. IGN's Travis Fahs described X-treme as "an empty vessel for Sega's ambitions and the hopes of their fans" and said it was an important change for Sega, its mascot and the Saturn. Levi Buchanan, also writing for IGN, said while the Saturn's lack of a true Sonic sequel "didn't wholly destroy" its chances, it "sure didn't help matters much". Dave Zdyrko, who operated a prominent Saturn fan site, said: "I don't know if [X-treme] could've saved the Saturn, but ... Sonic helped make the Genesis and it made absolutely no sense why there wasn't a great new Sonic title ready at or near the launch of the [Saturn]".

In a 2007 retrospective, producer Wallis said that X-treme would have been able to compete with Nintendo's Super Mario 64. Senn believed that a version of X-treme built by him with Alon's engine could have sold well. Next Generation said that X-treme would have damaged Sega's reputation if it did not compare well to competition such as Super Mario 64 and Crash Bandicoot. Naka was dissatisfied with the game, and in 2012 recalled feeling relief when he learned of its cancellation.

Some X-treme elements appeared in later Sonic games. Sega reused Sonic's 3D model in the edutainment game Sonic's Schoolhouse (1996), while Chaos, who was conceived for X-treme, appeared as one of Sonic Adventure's antagonists. Journalists noted similarities in level themes and mechanics between X-treme and the 2013 game Sonic Lost World, although Iizuka, now Sonic Team's head, said the resemblance was coincidental. Senn went on to work on the Wii U game Sonic Boom: Rise of Lyric, which was released in 2014 to overwhelmingly negative reviews.

=== Prototypes and recreations ===
For years, little content from X-treme was released beyond promotional screenshots. Fahs wrote in 2008 that most X-treme developers were unwilling to discuss the game, as "the ordeal remain[ed] a painful memory of unimaginable stress, pressure, and ultimate disappointment". In 2006, a copy of an early test engine was sold at auction for US$2500 to an anonymous collector. An animated GIF image of gameplay was released, and after a fundraising project by the "Assemblergames" website community purchased the disc from the collector, the disk image was leaked on July 17, 2007. Senn created a website with development history including early footage, a playable character named Tiara, and concept music. Senn considered finishing X-treme himself and used some of its concepts in a Sonic fangame, though his plans never materialized.

In February 2015, a fan obtained X-treme source code and released a playable build, featuring the level shown in the E3 1996 demo. Hardcore Gamer described it as rough but inventive, lacking speed but retaining the spirit of Sonic's design. They felt it could have been a good direction for the franchise and a boost for the Saturn had it been completed. In March 2017, another fan began developing a homebrew Saturn game based on X-treme, Sonic Z-treme, and released a build in September 2018. Eurogamer said it was an impressive effort that combined X-treme-style ideas and levels with new concepts.

== See also ==
- Development hell
- Crunch
