= Comix Zone =

1995 video game

- North American box art
- Developer: Sega Technical Institute (Note: Game Boy Advance port developed by Virtucraft)
- Publisher: Sega
- Producer: Mike Wallis
- Designer: Peter Morawiec
- Programmers: Stieg Hedlund; Adrian Stephens
- Artists: Chris Senn; Tony DeZuniga; Alex Niño
- Writer: Peter Morawiec
- Composer: Howard Drossin
- Platforms: Sega Genesis, Windows, Game Boy Advance
- Release: Genesis: NA: July 1995; JP: September 1, 1995; EU: October 6, 1995; Windows: NA: November 13, 1995; EU: March 1996; Game Boy Advance: EU: September 11, 2002
- Genre: Beat 'em up
- Mode: Single-player

Comix Zone (Note: Japanese: コミックスゾーン, Hepburn: Komikkuzōn) is a 1995 beat 'em up game developed by Sega Technical Institute (S.T.I.) and published by Sega for the Sega Genesis. Set within the panels of a comic book, it follows the comic writer/artist Sketch Turner who, after being transported into the comic by one of his creations, attempts to escape while contending with various threats. The game sees players traversing six levels, where they interact with the comic world and must defeat enemies, or occasionally solve puzzles, to progress.

Conceived by S.T.I. programmer Peter Morawiec, the concept for the game was originally shown off in 1992 via a demonstration video, entitled Joe Pencil Trapped In The Comix Zone. The concept was greenlit by Sega of America C.E.O. Tom Kalinske and development began on the game in late 1993. After repeated delays in order to implement more features, the game was released in July 1995 in North America, in Japan on September, and Europe in October of the same year.

The game was generally well received by critics, who often praised its visual presentation and soundtrack but also criticized its perceived high difficulty level and short length. Despite mainly positive reception, the game was not financially successful, in part due to its late release for the Genesis and the advent of more sophisticated fifth-generation game consoles. Since then, the game has gone on to acquire a cult following and be re-released on multiple occasions for digital storefronts and video game compilations.

== Gameplay ==
Sketch Turner kicking an enemy through a set of comic panels. The interface at the top right shows Sketch's current health and items.

Comix Zone is a side-scrolling beat 'em up game with minor platform and puzzle elements. The game is set within the panels of a comic book; with dialogue rendered through speech balloons while environments resemble hand-drawn American superhero comics. Sketch Turner, the player character, can interact with the comic world in a variety of ways, such as by ripping a part of the page into a paper plane to attack an enemy.

There are six levels, or pages, in total, each of which are set across three themed “episodes”. In each level, Sketch traverses a series of panels. Each panel either contains enemies or a simple puzzle that must be tackled to progress to another panel. Occasionally the player gets to choose from a branching set of panels, which eventually lead back to a single panel. Sketch's health is represented by a life bar and is diminished if he is attacked or is hit by an enemy or obstacle. When Sketch's health depletes completely, or he falls down a pit, the game ends unless the player has obtained a continue by completing an episode.

Players can store up to three items in order to overcome obstacles or enemies. Most items in the game can be found by using Roadkill, a rat and himself an item, to peel back parts of the page to discover them. Many items, such as knives, offer help in combat situations, however only one item, iced tea, can heal the player's life bar.

== Synopsis ==
Comix Zone is set within a comic book of the same name, with the comic itself being set on a post-apocalyptic Earth. Each level is set in a different part of the comic world, such as a decimated New York City, the Himalayas, and the atolls of Zealand. The player controls Sketch Turner, a comic writer/artist who created the comic after dreaming vividly about its contents. While working on Comix Zone during a thunder-storm, Sketch's comic is hit by a lightning bolt, causing the book's antagonist, a mutant named Mortus, to escape its pages. Desiring a physical form in the real world, Mortus sends Sketch into the comic in the hopes of killing him and receiving a body in the process. Upon being transported, Sketch is met by Alissa Cyan, a defense force general fighting against Mortus who believes that Sketch came to save her world. Sketch disputes this fact, but regardless decides to go on Alissa's mission.

The duo traverse through the comic world for a while, defeating many of Mortus's henchmen along the way, until eventually reaching a weapons factory containing a nuclear weapon hidden on a derelict ship. As Alissa attempts to defuse the weapon, Mortus comes back into the comic and throws her into a chamber of rising liquid. Sketch manages to successfully defeat Mortus, frees Alissa from the chamber, and escapes the comic with her just as the weapon self-detonates. Now in the real world, Alissa enlists in the army and, after months, is promoted to Chief of Security for the United States. Comix Zone becomes the best-selling comic book ever, selling out on the first day and making him a celebrity overnight. Alissa moves in with Sketch and they live happily together.

== Development ==
=== Conception ===
The game was conceived by the Sega Technical Institute (S.T.I.) programmer Peter Morawiec. Many of Morawiec's fellow S.T.I. developers were comic book fans and made monthly trips to local comic shops. He devised the Comix Zone concept after joining his co-workers on one of their trips to a shop in Palo Alto, California. Morawiec "felt that comics and games could be very complementary" and began working on a technology demonstration for his Amiga. The story was inspired by the 1985 music video for "Take On Me" by A-ha, which depicts a race car driver in a comic book connecting with a woman in the real world. Morawiec added a dystopian setting based on his passion for science fiction films.

Morawiec presented the video, "Joe Pencil Trapped in the Comix Zone", to S.T.I. head Roger Hector in December 1992. Hector was enthralled by the concept, saying: "The minute I saw it, I knew it was going to be great." He encouraged Morawiec to pitch it directly to Sega of America C.E.O. Tom Kalinske, who approved it. Although Kalinske wanted development to begin immediately, Comix Zone was placed on hold so S.T.I. could work on Sonic Spinball (1993), as Sega wanted to have a Sonic the Hedgehog game available for the 1993 Christmas shopping season. Following Spinball's release, S.T.I. pitched several concepts, including Comix Zone, to Sega management. Kalinske remembered Comix Zone and asked S.T.I. to begin development.

Morawiec approached programmer Adrian Stephens, who had joined S.T.I. as a programmer as Spinball was nearing completion, about working on Comix Zone. Development began with a three-man team of Morawiec, Stephens, and executive producer Dean Lester. According to Hector, "It took a few months to put together a team capable of delivering the game". The team grew as large as a dozen people and was given high priority at S.T.I. and the full support of the studio. Additional staff included Jonah Hex co-creator Tony DeZuniga, comic book artist Alex Niño, lead animator Bob Steele, artist Chris Senn, programmer Stieg Hedlund, and associate producer Mike Wallis. Hector, who served as the manager, credited Morawiec as the project lead.

=== Production ===
The initial protagonist was Joe Pencil, a "geeky-looking" character who Morawiec based on "the classic comic book angle of a scrawny kid getting transformed into a powerful superhero." Sega's marketing department objected to the character's name and design, so he was renamed Sketch Turner and Morawiec, a fan of the Smashing Pumpkins, redesigned him to resemble a grunge rocker. The marketing department also demanded, against Morawiec's wishes, that Sketch have a sidekick, a popular trend in games at the time. Morawiec did not want Sketch to be followed by a human or a large animal, so he conceived Roadkill since a rat "didn't take up a lot of screen space, and we could do quite a bit with it in terms of puzzles and such." The marketing department felt that a pet rat was an awkward choice, but Lester and the other developers supported it.

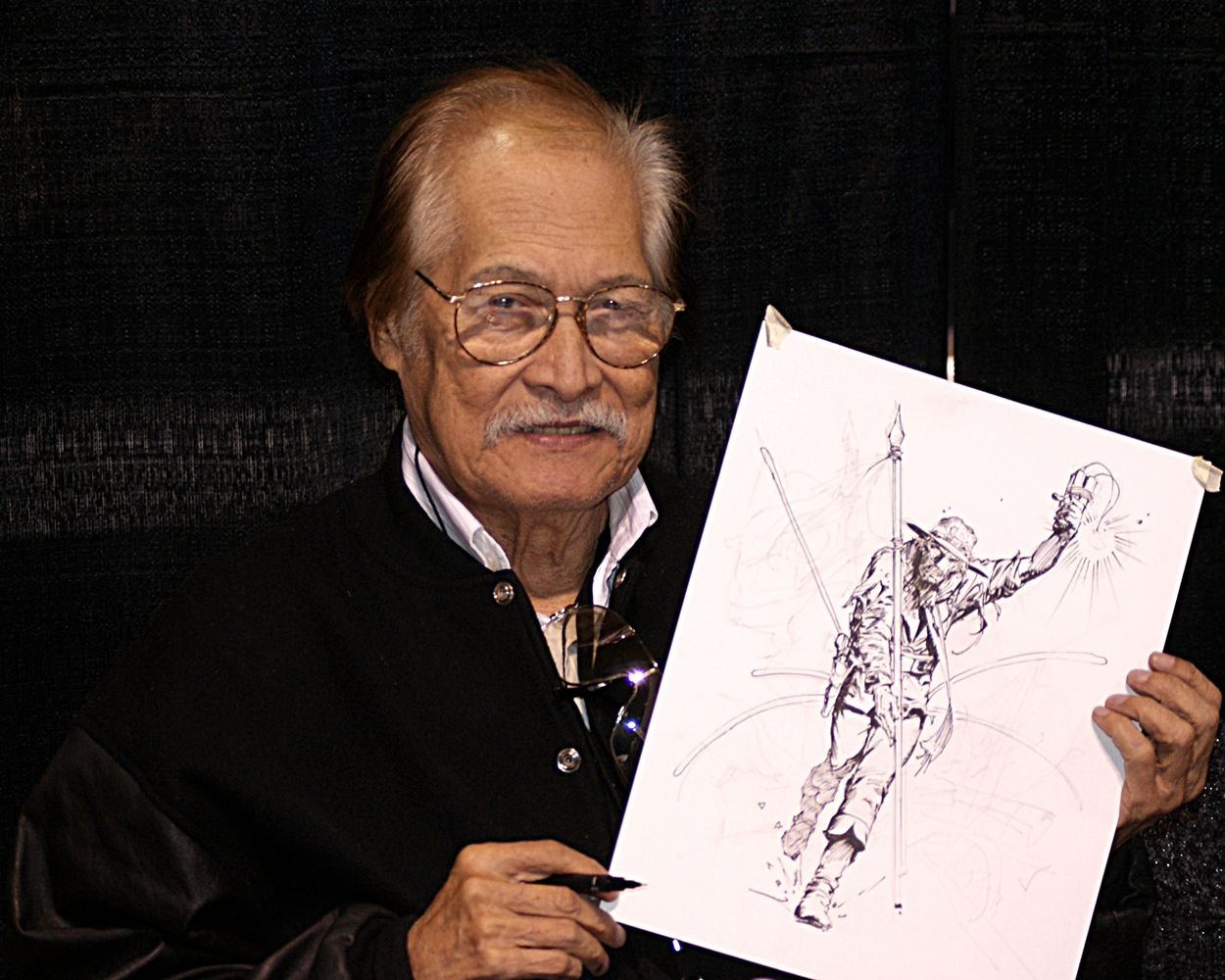
Jonah Hex co-creator Tony DeZuniga (pictured in 2011) designed Comix Zone's beginning and ending sequences.

S.T.I. sought to design Comix Zone faithfully to its comic book theme, including in its animation style. DeZuniga designed the beginning and ending sequences; he drew the art with ink and pencils before scanning it into a computer and processing it for the Genesis. Senn contributed character animations as well as some background art and bosses. As development progressed, Stephens found it challenging to program the game so it would fit within two megabytes while being able to decompress large pages of graphics during play. He noted that the Genesis was not designed with this process in mind, but was pleased that he managed to make it happen. When S.T.I. sent Comix Zone to Sega of Japan for review, it received a note claiming the game "embodied everything that was wrong with American culture". Hedlund said the team took this as "high praise".

Comix Zone became S.T.I.'s top project with the full support of Sega's marketing department. The development was relatively smooth, though the game was repeatedly delayed so the team could add more features, leading to a release late in the Genesis' life-cycle. Comix Zone was one of the only two games, the other being The Ooze, to bear the S.T.I. logo. It was the first game that Wallis worked on during his time at Sega, and the last Genesis game Senn worked on. The soundtrack was composed by Howard Drossin, who used the GEMS sound driver and chose a rock music style. Drossin sought to demonstrate the sound capabilities of the Genesis and that it could produce more than just chiptune. He provided most of the male audio clips, while various administrative assistants provided female audio clips. Morawiec contributed the voice of the villain Gravis.

Late in development, Sega's testing department recommended that the difficulty level be increased. Average players found it difficult to complete the game as a result, and Morawiec expressed regret that he followed the test department's recommendation. As development concluded, pressure was mounting as the American S.T.I. team had not released a game since Spinball. Further complicating matters was the forthcoming release of Sega's new consoles, the 32X and Sega Saturn, and Stephens expecting a child. Resultingly, Comix Zone's scope was reduced for a sooner-than-planned release and two levels had to be removed. In retrospect, Morawiec felt the development would have greatly benefited from the contributions of S.T.I.'s more experienced Japanese staff, who had split from the main team following the release of Sonic the Hedgehog 2 (1992).

== Release ==
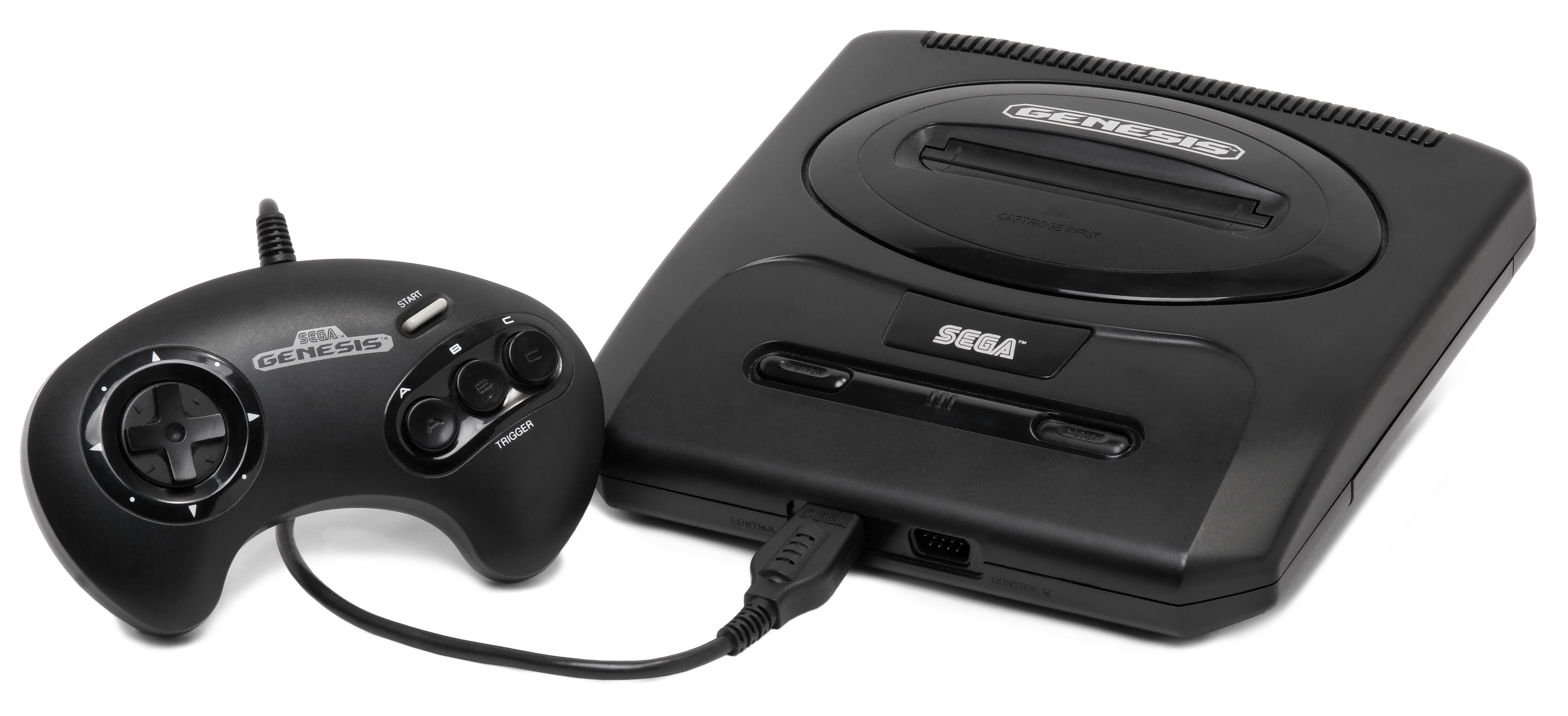
Comix Zone was released late into the Genesis life-cycle which, coupled with the advent of fifth-generation consoles, caused its sales to suffer.

Comix Zone was released for the Genesis in North America in July 1995, in Japan on September 1, 1995, and in Europe on October 6, 1995. The game received a small print run in Japan and became an expensive collector's item in the years following its release. Sales of Comix Zone were hampered by its late release in the Genesis' life-cycle, after the worldwide launch of next-generation hardware like the Saturn and Sony's PlayStation. According to Stephens, Hector said that Comix Zone failed to break even, which Morawiec attributed to the popularity of the PlayStation.

To promote Comix Zone as "edgy and cool", Sega bundled Comix Zone with a C.D. featuring rock songs by popular bands such as Love and Rockets, Danzig, and the Jesus and Mary Chain. S.T.I. originally planned for the bundled C.D. to contain several Comix Zone tracks performed by a grunge band that Drossin had formed in Los Angeles, but Sega chose a different approach. Morawiec said that the team, particularly Drossin, was upset by the change, though their planned C.D. was still manufactured and distributed via a magazine, European and Windows copies, and Sega's short-lived Sega Tunes label. Hardcore Gaming 101 described the rock C.D. as "a stunt that further drives the nineties-ness of [Comix Zone] as a time capsule for an era when game companies often released a lot of crazy promotional crap to sell their products".

== Reception ==
Reception

Aggregate scores
Aggregator	Score
GameRankings	76%
Metacritic	71/100

Review scores
Publication	Score
AllGame	4.5/5
Electronic Gaming Monthly	8.5/10, 8/10, 7/10, 8/10
Famitsu	7/10, 7/10, 7/10, 9/10
Next Generation	3/5

GamePro considered the game's visuals a successful recreation of the look and feel of a comic book, but said that the game quickly sours once the player encounters the repetitive combat and overly simplistic puzzles. They also found problems with the controls: "Sketch can't move rapidly around the panel, and button slamming yields unpredictable results." They concluded: "You really want to love Comix Zone for its original elements, but after a few panels, the honeymoon's over." The four reviewers of Electronic Gaming Monthly acknowledged the problems with the controls, but also remarked that the graphics are exceptionally colorful for a Genesis game, and argued that the originality of its comic book look makes it a must-have despite its flaws.

Next Generation reviewed the Genesis version of the game and stated that while the unique concept, outstanding visuals, and solid soundtrack make the game of interest, the gameplay is derivative and repetitive. They summed up: "A very cool idea for a game that wasn't executed properly, Comix Zone is better than most." In 2017, GamesRadar ranked Comix Zone 43rd on their "Best Sega Genesis/Mega Drive games of all time." They lauded the animation and sound effects as "magnificent" and beyond the supposed limitation of the console.

== Ports and re-releases ==
The Game Boy Advance port of the game (right) alters the game's graphical assets to accommodate for the system's smaller screen size.

A port of the game for Windows 3.1, making use of the WinG graphics API, was released by Sega PC in North America in November 1995 and in Europe in March 1996. The port, released when Microsoft was promoting Windows 95 as a legitimate game platform, is largely identical to the Genesis version, though it features a MIDI rendition of the soundtrack. A Game Boy Advance (GBA) port, developed by Virtucraft, was exclusively released in Europe in limited quantities on September 11, 2002. Because of the GBA's smaller screen size, much of the game's assets had to be altered to accommodate for the smaller screen size. GamesTM wrote that its reduced screen size "lessened the illusion of being inside a comic and made the game feel more like your traditional beat-'em-up."

Comix Zone has been re-released various times as part of game compilations. The Japanese version of Sonic Mega Collection (2002), a GameCube compilation of the Genesis Sonic games, includes Comix Zone as an unlockable game. Yojiro Ogawa, Sonic Team's head designer, was a "huge fan" of Comix Zone and pushed for its inclusion. Internationally, it was included in the expanded PlayStation 2 (PS2) and Xbox version, Sonic Mega Collection Plus. Other compilations featuring Comix Zone include Sega Smash Pack 2 (2000) for Windows, Sega Genesis Collection (2005) for the PS2 and PlayStation Portable; Sonic's Ultimate Genesis Collection (2009) for the PlayStation 3 (PS3) and Xbox 360; and Sega Genesis Classics (2018) for Linux, macOS, Nintendo Switch, PlayStation 4, and Xbox One. Additionally, the game has been emulated for download for the Wii via the Virtual Console (2007), the Xbox 360 via Xbox Live Arcade (2009), Windows via Steam (2010), the PS3 via PlayStation Store (2011), Android and iOS as part of the Sega Forever service (2017), and the Nintendo Switch via the Nintendo Classics service (2022). The Xbox 360 and PS3 releases were branded as part of the Sega Vintage Collection line. The game also comes preinstalled on the Sega Genesis Mini, a dedicated console that can play select Genesis games that was released in 2019.

== Legacy ==
In the years following its release, the game has received a cult following.

=== Film adaptation ===
In August 2022, Sega announced that they partnered with Picturestart to develop a film adaptation of the game. Picturestart's Royce Reeves-Darby, Erik Feig, and Samie Kim Falvey were set to produce the film alongside Sega's Toru Nakahara and Kagasei Shimomura, while Young Justice writer Mae Catt was writing the script. The Hollywood Reporter wrote that Catt's story featured a disgruntled comic book creator and a queer writer of color who become stuck in a comic book and work together to stop a supervillain.
