= Sonic Mega Collection =

2002 video game compilation

- North American GameCube box art
- Developer: Sonic Team
- Publisher: Sega
- Director: Yojiro Ogawa
- Producer: Yuji Naka
- Designer: Hideaki Moriya
- Artist: Yuji Uekawa
- Composer: Hideaki Kobayashi
- Series: Sonic the Hedgehog
- Platforms: GameCube, PlayStation 2, Xbox, Windows
- Release: GameCube: NA: November 12, 2002; JP: December 19, 2002; EU: March 7, 2003; PlayStation 2, Xbox: NA: November 2, 2004; JP: December 9, 2004; EU: February 4, 2005; Windows: EU: March 31, 2006; NA: March 9, 2007
- Genre: Various
- Modes: Single-player, multiplayer

Sonic Mega Collection (Note: Japanese: ソニック メガコレクション, Hepburn: Sonikku Mega Korekushon) is a 2002 video game compilation developed by Sonic Team and published by Sega for the GameCube. It is a compilation of several Sonic the Hedgehog games originally released for the Genesis, along with a few other Sega-published titles for the system.

According to the director, Yojiro Ogawa, the purpose of the compilation was to introduce younger players to the original games in the Sonic series. The games are played through a Genesis emulator developed by Sonic Team themselves. Outside of the games, the compilation includes Sonic-themed videos and illustrations, as well as high-resolution scans of the instruction manuals and Sonic the Hedgehog comic covers. In 2004, the compilation was re-released for the PlayStation 2, Xbox, and Windows as Sonic Mega Collection Plus with additional Sonic games originally released for the Game Gear.

Reception to Sonic Mega Collection as well as Plus was positive, with praise going to its faithful emulation, strong core games, nostalgic value, and low price. Criticism was directed toward the absence of Sonic CD (1993), lackluster extras, weaker spin-off titles, tedious unlocking mechanics, and some visual issues in Plus. A second compilation focused on rare and obscure Sonic titles, Sonic Gems Collection, was released in 2005.

== Overview ==
Sonic Mega Collection compiles 14 emulated games originally released for the Sega Genesis, limited to only 12 in releases outside of Japan. Seven games are available by default, while the remainder are unlocked by launching other games repeatedly. These include three games that recreate the Sonic & Knuckles "lock-on technology" to allow for new modes and/or playable characters in the first three Sonic games, and four non-Sonic games published by Sega, two of which are exclusive to the Japanese release. High-resolution instruction manual scans are included for each game. An "Extras" section features over 100 scans of comic covers from Archie Comics' Sonic the Hedgehog series, illustrations of Sonic characters throughout the franchise's history, and a handful of videos promoting other Sonic games, including the opening and ending cutscenes from Sonic CD.

Sonic Mega Collection Plus includes all 14 of the games from the original release in all regions, plus the addition of six Game Gear games. The compilation's user interface has been updated, and all games now support the ability to save the player's progress mid-level using save states. The illustration gallery has been expanded with artwork from games released since the original Mega Collection, while all videos from the original release have been omitted, replaced by a gallery of storyboards and in-production renders of cutscenes from Sonic Heroes.

Games included in Sonic Mega Collection
Default games
Title	Genre	Original release	Developer
Sonic the Hedgehog	Platform	1991	Sonic Team
Sonic the Hedgehog 2	Platform	1992	Sega Technical Institute
Sonic the Hedgehog 3	Platform	1994	Sega Technical Institute
Sonic & Knuckles	Platform	1994	Sega Technical Institute
Sonic 3D Blast	Platform	1996	Traveller's Tales, Sonic Team
Sonic Spinball	Pinball	1993	Sega Technical Institute
Dr. Robotnik's Mean Bean Machine	Puzzle	1993	Compile
Unlockable games
Title	Genre	Original release	Developer
Blue Sphere	Platform	1994	Sonic Team
Knuckles in Sonic 2	Platform	1994	Sega Technical Institute
Sonic 3 & Knuckles	Platform	1994	Sega Technical Institute
Flicky	Platform	1991 (Note: While Flicky was originally released for arcades in 1984, the 1991 Genesis port is the version used in the compilation.)	Sega
Ristar	Platform	1995	Sega
The Ooze (Note: Exclusive to Japan in Sonic Mega Collection; available in all regions in Sonic Mega Collection Plus.)	Action	1995	Sega Technical Institute
Comix Zone	Beat 'em up	1995	Sega Technical Institute
Games exclusive to Sonic Mega Collection Plus
Title	Genre	Original release	Developer
Sonic the Hedgehog	Platform	1991	Ancient
Sonic Labyrinth	Action, puzzle	1995	Minato Giken
Sonic Drift	Kart racing	1994	Sega
Sonic Chaos	Platform	1993	Aspect
Sonic Blast	Platform	1996	Aspect
Dr. Robotnik's Mean Bean Machine	Puzzle	1993	Compile

== Development and release ==
Mega Collection was developed by Sonic Team, the studio behind most games in the Sonic series. According to director Yojiro Ogawa, Sonic Team's goal with the compilation was to introduce children to older games in the series and showcase what made Sonic successful. Sonic Team chose to focus on including all the Genesis Sonic games. Rather than porting them from the Genesis, they collaborated with VR-1 Japan to develop an emulator to run the games' ROM images. Series co-creator Yuji Naka, who served as producer, said the team intended to include the 1993 Sega CD game Sonic CD, but storage constraints prevented this. Sonic Team also considered including BlueSky Software's Vectorman (1995). CD and Vectorman later appeared in Sonic Gems Collection (2005), a successor to Mega Collection focusing on rare Sonic games. Sonic Team had trouble gathering materials for the compilation because it had been a decade since they made the games and "Sega's not that good about keeping history." For instance, Naka wanted to include the original prototype of the first game but Sonic Team could not find its ROM image.

Sega announced Mega Collection as a GameCube exclusive in early July 2002, and revealed which games would be included later that month. The compilation went gold the following November; Naka said Sonic Team felt a sense of accomplishment when they completed it. Mega Collection was released in North America on November 12, 2002, in Japan on December 19, 2002, and in Europe on March 21, 2003. In European territories, Infogrames distributed the compilation. When Sega began to expand support for the PlayStation 2, it commissioned a version of Mega Collection for that console and the Xbox. This version, Sonic Mega Collection Plus, was announced at E3 2004. Plus was released in North America on November 2, 2004, in Japan on December 9, 2004, and in Europe on February 4, 2005. A Windows version was released in Europe on March 31, 2006, and in North America on March 9, 2007. It was later included in the Sonic PC Collection (2009).

== Reception ==
=== GameCube version ===
Reception

Aggregate score
Aggregator	Score
Metacritic	75/100

Review scores
Publication	Score
AllGame	3/5
Electronic Gaming Monthly	8/10, 6/10, 7.5/10
Eurogamer	7/10
Game Informer	8.75/10
GamePro	4/5
GameRevolution	B−
GameSpot	7.2/10
GameZone	8.8/10
IGN	7.5/10
Nintendo World Report	7.5/10
X-Play	4/5

Reviews for Sonic Mega Collection were "generally favorable" according to Metacritic. Chet Barber of Game Informer and Fran Mirabella III of IGN regarded it as one of the best compilations of its time. Critics considered it a great value for Sonic fans and newcomers, especially those without access to a Genesis, and its low price tag was said to complement its value. However, Michael Cole of Nintendo World Report and Johnny Liu of GameRevolution deemed it less essential to those who already own the originals or Sonic Jam. Sonic Mega Collection was a runner-up for GameSpot's annual "Best Platformer on GameCube" award, which went to Super Mario Sunshine.

Critics lauded the faithful emulation quality of the Genesis games, which provided an authentic experience. They emphasized that the controls adapted well to the GameCube controller. Although Mugwum of Eurogamer faulted the preservation of the games' flaws, he and Mirabella noted that the split-screen multiplayer mode of Sonic the Hedgehog 2 was improved from the original Genesis version to run at a full resolution. The lack of some modern enhancements was lamented. Scott Alan Marriott of AllGame, Greg Bemis of Extended Play and Jeff Gerstmann of GameSpot pointed out the lack of a save state function, and Marriott added that high score and best time tracking should have been included. Liu wished for an updated control scheme for Sonic Spinball that used the GameCube controller's shoulder buttons. Major Mike of GamePro and Miguel Lopez of Electronic Gaming Monthly felt that the games were showing their age, with Lopez arguing that they have held up less gracefully than the competing Super Mario series.

The core Sonic games — Sonic 1, 2, 3, and Knuckles — were praised as timeless classics, with Louis Bedigian of GameZone citing Sonic 2 as the pinnacle for its level design and speed. However, he saw Knuckles as a step backward due to the level design's accommodation of the slower-moving Knuckles. Unlockables like Ristar and Flicky were appreciated for adding value, with Bemis praising Ristar as a gem. Sonic 3D Blast and Sonic Spinball were criticized as weaker entries, lacking the series’ signature speed and polish. Dr. Robotnik's Mean Bean Machine was received more positively, with Liu calling it one of the best chain-reaction-based puzzle games and Bemis highlighting its appeal as a multiplayer game. The omission of Sonic CD was a widespread source of disappointment, as it was considered one of the best Sonic games. Other noted omissions included Sonic R, SegaSonic the Hedgehog, Knuckles' Chaotix, Sonic the Fighters, and the Game Gear titles. Bemis and Cole criticized the unlocking process, requiring repetitive game launches, as tedious and poorly designed.

The supplementary material was considered underwhelming and poorly executed for its lack of depth. Cole and Mirabella negatively compared the presentation to Sonic Jam, which they said had a more substantial interface and amount of content. Mirabella added that the video compression was low-quality, and Cole dismissed the menus' music and artwork as "so-so", comparing it to Phantasy Star Online. Marriott and Liu appreciated the comic covers and manuals, but said that they felt incomplete without context or additional content like print ads or character bios. The inclusion of Sonic CD's intro and ending videos was bittersweet, highlighting its absence, though Liu remarked that the song "Sonic Boom" was "almost bad enough to rival the DK monkey rap". Mugwum was annoyed by the menus' loading times.

=== PS2 and Xbox versions ===
Reception

Aggregate score
Aggregator	Score	
Aggregator	PS2	Xbox
Metacritic	73/100	75/100

Review scores
Publication	Score	
Publication	PS2	Xbox
1Up.com	B	N/A
Eurogamer	7/10	N/A
Game Informer	7.5/10	7.5/10
GameSpot	N/A	7.5/10
GameSpy	4/5	4/5
GameZone	7.7/10	N/A
IGN	7.8/10	7.8/10
Official U.S. PlayStation Magazine	3/5	N/A
PALGN	N/A	6.5/10
TeamXbox	N/A	7.6/10
PlayStation World	7/10	N/A

The Xbox version of Sonic Mega Collection Plus was also met positively, while the PlayStation 2 version received "mixed or average" reviews. Avery Score of GameSpot, Chris Baker of GameSpy, and Hilary Goldstein of IGN lauded the compilation's low price for its number of games, assessing it as an excellent deal. Aceinet of GameZone and Rob Semsey of TeamXbox noted the charm of revisiting the series' prime, with the core games still holding up due to their speed, level design, and gameplay. Jeremy Zoss of Game Informer and Matt of PALGN highlighted its appeal to both longtime fans and newcomers curious about gaming history. Matt, 1Up Network's Jeremy Parish, and Eurogamer's Tom Bramwell advised owners of the GameCube version against repurchasing, as they considered the Game Gear titles lackluster and the unlockable games tedious to access.

Like the GameCube version, the emulation was described as near-perfect, accurately replicating the original Genesis and Game Gear games’ look, sound, and feel, including glitches and slowdowns. Goldstein called the collection "the best emulations on any console or handheld to date", while Score and Matt noted that flaws like framerate stutters persisted due to the direct ROM emulation. Baker and Goldstein noticed a black border around the screen, but did not consider it a significant distraction. Goldstein noted the colorful Genesis games as a "refreshing change" from modern grim visuals, but he observed minor ghosting in the backgrounds, and said that the Game Gear titles looked "gruesome" when scaled up. Parish criticized the blurry, interpolated Game Gear visuals with no option for crisp pixels, and Semsey noted that playing the Game Gear titles in full-screen exacerbated their blurriness. Score, Matt, and Semsey praised the convenience of the ability to save progress at any time, though Score noted it could feel like "cheating" for purists, as it altered the original experience.

The core Sonic games were again regarded as standout titles. Parish and Goldstein praised their precise emulation, innovative level design, and enduring appeal, and Baker noted their ability to evoke marvel at their speed. Parish highlighted 2 and Knuckles as the strongest, citing 2's "finely-honed action" and Knuckles's "lush graphics and thoughtful level design". However, he noted the simplicity of the Sonic formula compared to Super Mario's exploration-focused gameplay. Aceinet argued 2 and 3 better captured the essence of Sonic than the first game. Dr. Robotnik's Mean Bean Machine was a standout among the spin-off titles. Score, Baker, and Semsey noted its lasting appeal, with Baker saying it could "keep you busy for hours". Parish found the game "strange" after Puyo Puyo's introduction in America, and Bramwell questioned the inclusion of the Game Gear version given the Genesis version.

The Game Gear titles were regarded as the weakest part of the collection. Parish, Baker, and Goldstein found most of the Game Gear games sluggish, blurry, or nearly unplayable on large TVs due to resolution issues and doubled pixels. Bramwell, Baker, and Semsey cited Sonic the Hedgehog and Sonic Chaos as exceptions, deeming them decent 8-bit versions of the Genesis formula. Parish described the Game Gear ports as "awful" and "clumsy" compared to Genesis titles, while Zoss noted their visuals "made [his] eyes catch fire". Bramwell called Sonic Drift "terrible" and physically nauseating. Semsey acknowledged their appeal for nostalgia or for players who never owned a Game Gear, but Matt argued they added little to the package.

The unlockable non-Sonic titles were a welcome addition. Score, Baker, and Goldstein highlighted Comix Zone as a fan favorite for its unique comic-book style, Parish saw Ristar as the most entertaining while describing Flicky and The Ooze as forgettable. Parish and Baker criticized the tedious unlocking process, with Parish calling it "laborious drudgery". Bramwell likened it to waiting for a secret track on a music compilation CD 30 times. The absence of Sonic CD was a continuing disappointment, with Baker noting its divisive reputation but strong fanbase. Other noted omissions included SegaSonic the Hedgehog, Sonic the Hedgehog: Triple Trouble, Knuckles Chaotix, Sonic the Fighters, and Sonic R.

Reactions to the supplementary material were lukewarm. Score and Semsey appreciated the readable Sonic the Hedgehog "Firsts" comic and zoomable manuals, but Matt felt the extras "scraped the barrel" and lacked depth compared to the GameCube version's unique content. Matt and PlayStation World noted the extras were underwhelming for fans expecting more memorabilia, and Parish found the Sonic Heroes movies mediocre. Bramwell praised the menu's clean design, highlighting the use of game footage playing in the background.

The PlayStation 2 version of Mega Collection Plus received a "Platinum" sales award from the Entertainment and Leisure Software Publishers Association (ELSPA), indicating sales of at least 300,000 copies in the United Kingdom.

== Follow-up ==
A second Sonic the Hedgehog compilation, Sonic Gems Collection, was developed with a focus on rare and obscure titles such as Sonic CD, Sonic the Fighters, and Sonic R, as well as the remaining Game Gear games not included in Sonic Mega Collection Plus. Sonic Gems Collection was released in 2005, and received mixed reviews from critics.
