= Sonic's Ultimate Genesis Collection =

2009 video game compilation

- North American cover art depicting Sonic the Hedgehog with screenshots of included games in the background
- Developer: Backbone Entertainment
- Publisher: Sega
- Platforms: PlayStation 3, Xbox 360
- Release: NA: February 10, 2009; EU: February 20, 2009
- Genre: Various
- Modes: Single-player, multiplayer

Sonic's Ultimate Genesis Collection, (known in Europe or Brazil/Australia as Sega Mega Drive Ultimate Collection), is a 2009 video game compilation developed by Backbone Entertainment and published by Sega for the PlayStation 3 and Xbox 360. The compilation features 48 Sega games (49 counting two versions of Altered Beast) which were previously released for the Sega Genesis (including most of the Sonic the Hedgehog titles released for the system), arcades and the Master System. It is the sequel to the Sega Genesis Collection released previously for the PlayStation 2 and PlayStation Portable, but contains 16 more games (in NTSC regions, including unlockable extras).

== Overview ==
Sonic's Ultimate Genesis Collection compiles 40 emulated games originally released for the Sega Genesis by Sega. Additionally, eight non-Genesis games are unlockable by completing achievements in select titles. Many of the games featured were originally included in the compilation's predecessor Sega Genesis Collection (2006).

Games included in Sonic's Ultimate Genesis Collection
Default games
Title	Genre	Original release	Developer
Alex Kidd in the Enchanted Castle (Note: Previously included in Sega Genesis Collection (2006).)	Platform	1989	Sega
Alien Storm	Beat 'em up	1991	Sega
Altered Beast (Note: Altered Beast is included twice in the compilation. The default version featured in the collection is its Sega Genesis port, while the unlockable variant is the original arcade game.)	Beat 'em up	1988	Team Shinobi
Beyond Oasis	Action-adventure	1994	Ancient
Bonanza Bros.	Action	1991	Sega
Columns	Puzzle	1990	Jay Geertsen
Comix Zone	Beat 'em up	1995	Sega Technical Institute
Decap Attack	Platform	1991	Vic Tokai
Dr. Robotnik's Mean Bean Machine	Puzzle	1993	Compile
Dynamite Headdy	Platform	1994	Treasure
Ecco the Dolphin	Action-adventure	1992	Novotrade International
Ecco: The Tides of Time	Action-adventure	1994	Novotrade International
ESWAT: City Under Siege	Action	1990	Sega
Fatal Labyrinth	Role-playing	1990	Sega
Flicky	Action	1991	Sega
Gain Ground	Action	1991	Sega
Golden Axe	Beat 'em up	1989	Team Shinobi
Golden Axe II	Beat 'em up	1991	Sega
Golden Axe III	Beat 'em up	1993	Sega
Kid Chameleon	Platform	1992	Sega Technical Institute
Phantasy Star II	Role-playing	1989	Sega
Phantasy Star III: Generations of Doom	Role-playing	1990	Sega
Phantasy Star IV: The End of the Millennium	Role-playing	1993	Sega
Ristar	Platform	1995	Sega
Shining Force	Role-playing	1992	Climax Entertainment
Shining Force II	Role-playing	1993	Sonic! Software Planning
Shining in the Darkness	Role-playing	1991	Climax Entertainment
Shinobi III: Return of the Ninja Master	Platform	1993	Sega
Sonic & Knuckles	Platform	1994	Sega Technical Institute
Sonic 3D Blast	Platform	1996	Traveller's Tales, Sonic Team
Sonic the Hedgehog	Platform	1991	Sonic Team
Sonic the Hedgehog 2	Platform	1992	Sega Technical Institute
Sonic the Hedgehog 3	Platform	1994	Sega Technical Institute
Sonic Spinball	Pinball	1993	Sega Technical Institute
Streets of Rage	Beat 'em up	1991	Sega
Streets of Rage 2	Beat 'em up	1992	Sega
Streets of Rage 3	Beat 'em up	1994	Sega, Ancient
Super Thunder Blade	Rail shooter	1988	Sega
Vectorman	Platform	1995	BlueSky Software
Vectorman 2	Platform	1996	BlueSky Software
Unlockable games
Title	Genre	Original release	Developer
Alien Syndrome	Shoot 'em up	1987	Sega R&D1
Altered Beast	Beat 'em up	1988	Team Shinobi
Congo Bongo (Note: Included under original name, Tip-Top, in some regions.)	Action	1983	Sega, Ikegami Tsushinki
Fantasy Zone	Shoot 'em up	1986	Sega R&D1
Golden Axe Warrior	Action-adventure	1991	Sega
Phantasy Star	Role-playing	1987	Sega
Shinobi	Platform	1987	Team Shinobi
Space Harrier	Rail shooter	1985	Sega R&D1
Zaxxon	Shoot 'em up	1981	Sega, Ikegami Tsushinki

According to Ethan Einhorn, the producer for the collection, the three "lock-on" games (Knuckles in Sonic 2, Sonic 3 & Knuckles, and Blue Sphere) were not included due to "tight development times", and that including them would have meant "dropping several titles from the collection altogether", specifically the aforementioned nine unlockable games since "they all required unique emulation solutions".

== Reception ==
Reception

Aggregate score
Aggregator	Score	
Aggregator	PS3	Xbox 360
Metacritic	80/100	79/100

Review scores
Publication	Score	
Publication	PS3	Xbox 360
Computer and Video Games	N/A	7.3/10
Game Informer	8/10	8/10
GamesRadar+	8/10	8/10
GameZone	N/A	9/10
Giant Bomb	3/5	3/5
IGN	9/10	9/10
PlayStation Official Magazine – Australia	7/10	N/A
PlayStation Official Magazine – UK	7/10	N/A
Official U.S. PlayStation Magazine	8/10	N/A
PALGN	8/10	N/A
VideoGamer.com	8/10	8/10

Sonic's Ultimate Genesis Collection received "generally favorable" reviews, according to review aggregator website Metacritic.
