= Genesis Nomad =

Handheld game console by Sega

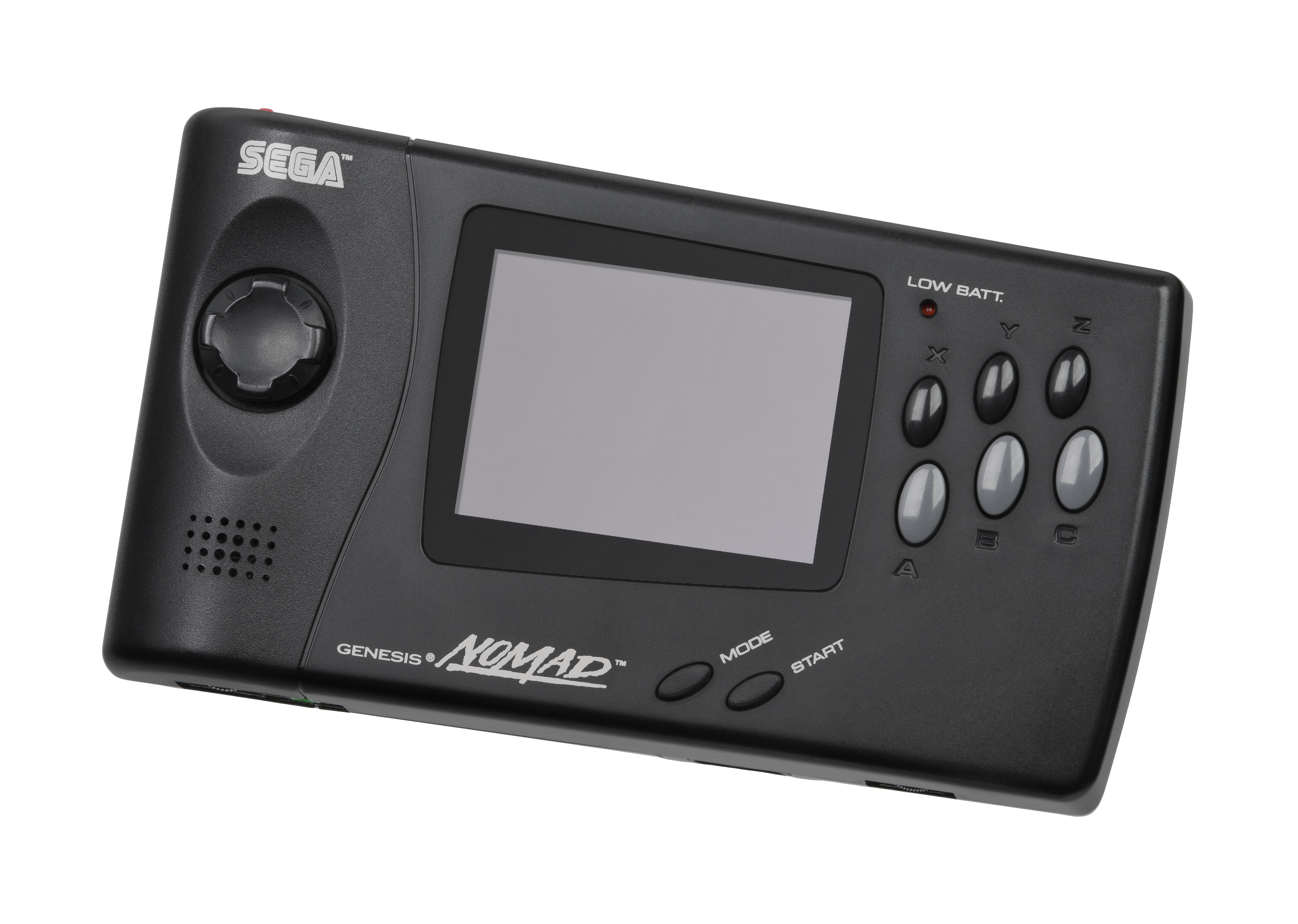
- Also known as: Sega Nomad
- Manufacturer: Sega
- Type: Handheld game console
- Generation: Fifth
- Released: NA: October 1995
- Discontinued: NA: 1999
- Media: Sega Genesis ROM cartridge
- CPU: Motorola 68000
- Display: 3.25-inch backlit color screen; AV connector 320x224d (NTSC)
- Sound: Mono speaker; Headphone jack
- Power: 6 AA batteries, 4 hours
- Predecessor: Game Gear; Mega Jet

The Genesis Nomad, also known as Sega Nomad, is a handheld game console manufactured by Sega exclusively for North America and released in October 1995. The Nomad is a portable variation of the Sega Genesis home video game console (known as the Mega Drive outside North America). It is based on the Mega Jet, a portable version of the home console designed for use on airline flights in Japan.

The Nomad was the last handheld console released by Sega. Released late in the Genesis era, it had a short lifespan. It was sold exclusively in North America, and uses regional lockout. Sega's focus on the Sega Saturn left the Nomad under-supported, and it was incompatible with several Genesis peripherals, including the Power Base Converter, the Sega CD, and the 32X. About 1 million units of the Nomad were sold, and it is considered a commercial failure. It was eventually discontinued in 1999.

== History ==
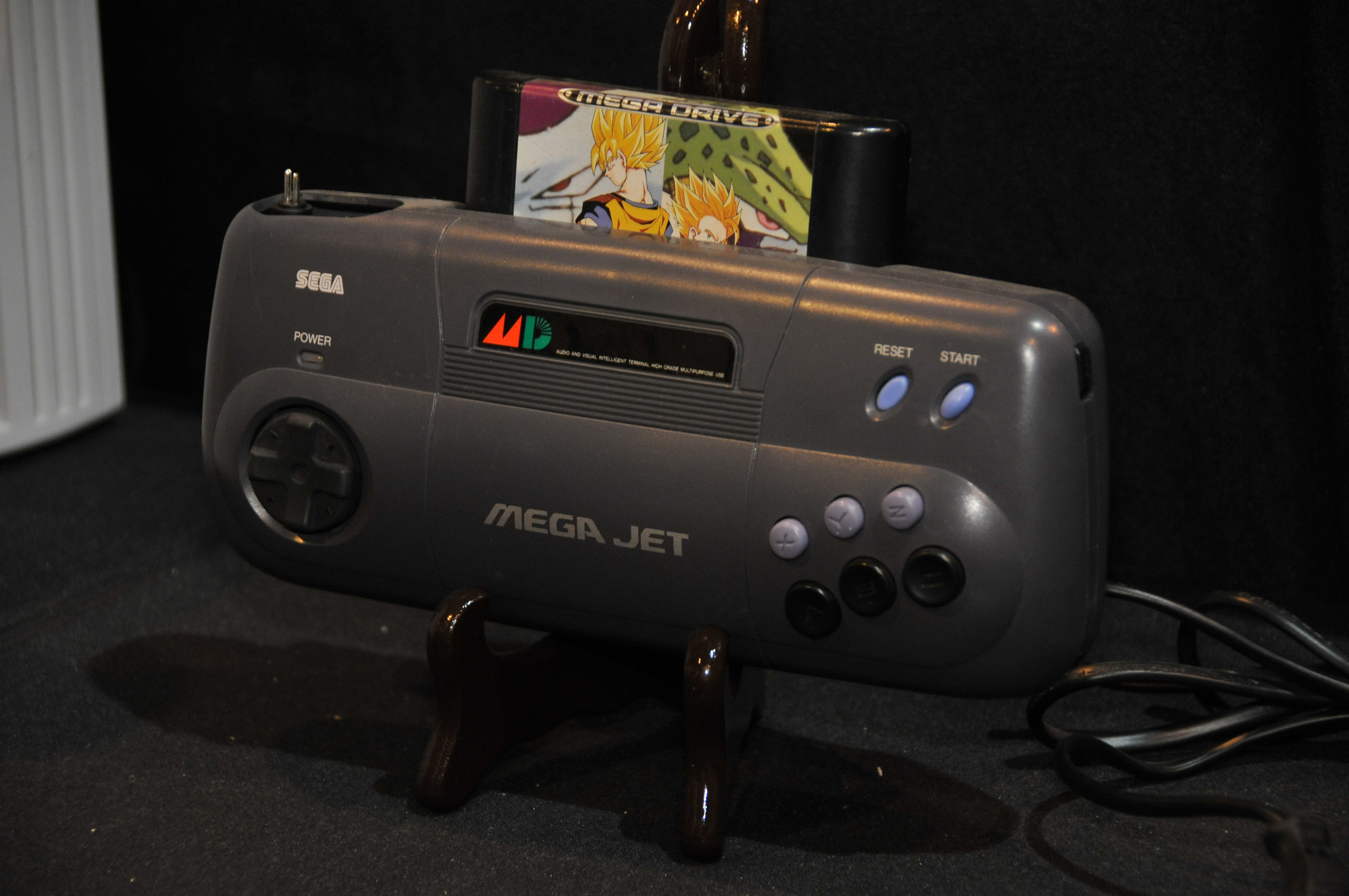
The Mega Jet, a portable Mega Drive designed for airplanes and cars, provided the design inspiration for the Genesis Nomad.

The Sega Genesis was Sega's entry into the 16-bit era of video game consoles. In Japan, Sega released the Mega Jet, a portable version of the Mega Drive for use on Japan Airlines flights. The Mega Jet requires a connection to a television screen and a power source, and so outside of airline flights can only be used in cars equipped with a television set and cigarette lighter receptacle. On planes, the Mega Jet was connected into armrest monitors. It had a limited consumer release in Japanese department stores in 1994, but did not see success.

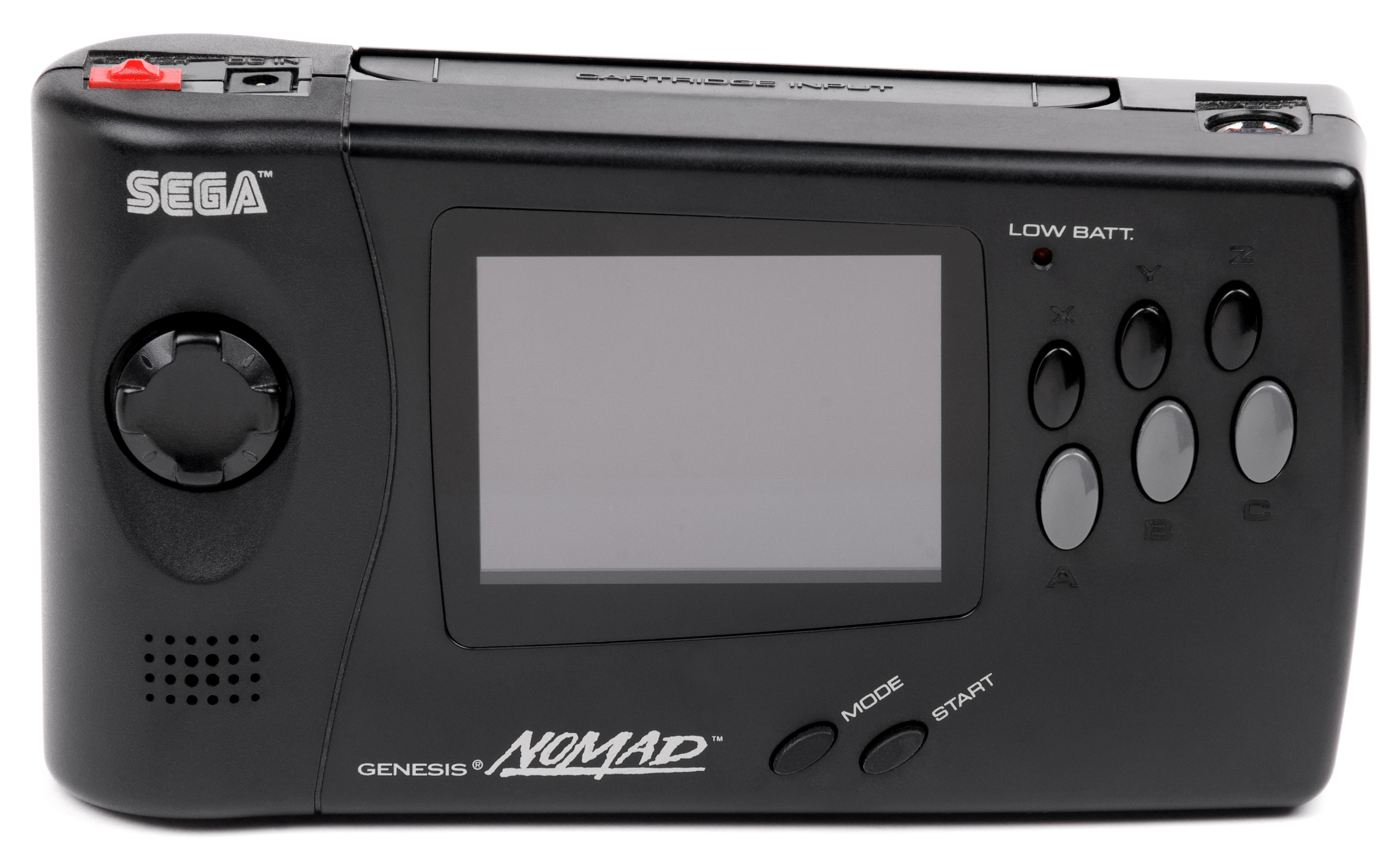
A front-to-top view of the Nomad, showing the red power switch, the "DC in" port, the cartridge input, and an "AV out" port to show the Nomad on a TV monitor

Planning to release a new handheld console to succeed the Game Gear, Sega originally intended to produce a system with a touchscreen interface two years before the Game.com handheld by Tiger Electronics. However, touchscreen technology was expensive at the time, so Sega instead released the Genesis Nomad, a handheld version of the Genesis. The development codename was "Project Venus". Sega hoped to capitalize on the Genesis's popularity in North America. At the time, the Genesis Nomad was the only handheld console that could connect to a television.

The Nomad was released in October 1995 in North America, and was not released in other territories. The release was six years into the market span of the Genesis, with an existing library of more than 500 Genesis games. While Sega Technical Institute's The Ooze was originally planned as a launch game, it was not included. According to former Sega of America research and development head Joe Miller, the Nomad was not intended to replace the Game Gear, and Sega had few plans for the new handheld. Sega was supporting five different consoles: Saturn, Genesis, Game Gear, Pico, and the Master System, as well as the Sega CD and 32X add-ons. In Japan, the Mega Drive had never been successful and the Saturn was initially more successful than Sony's PlayStation, so Sega Enterprises CEO Hayao Nakayama decided to focus on the Saturn, resulting in the end of support for the Genesis and Genesis-based products. Additionally, the Game Boy, Nintendo's handheld console that had been dominant in the market, became even more dominant with the release of Pokémon Red and Blue. This meant the Nomad was not successful. By 1999, the Nomad was being sold at less than a third of its original price.

== Technical specifications ==
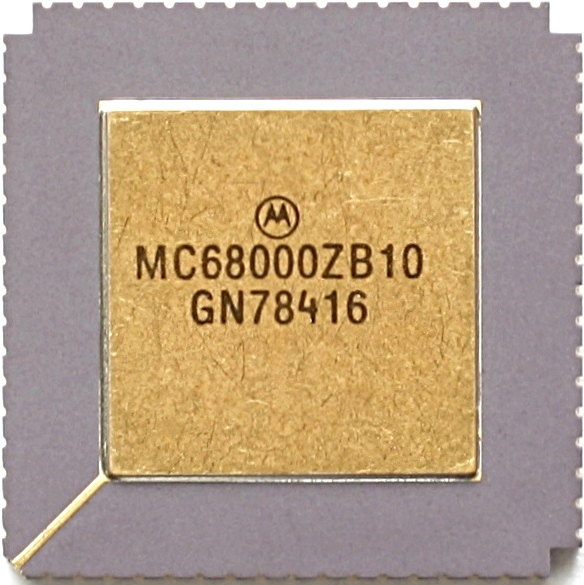
Motorola MC68000, similar to one used in the Genesis Nomad

Similar to the Genesis and the Mega Jet, the Nomad's main CPU is a Motorola 68000. Possessing similar memory, graphics, and sound capabilities, the Nomad is nearly identical to the full-size console; the only variation is that it is completely self-sufficient. The Nomad has a 3.25 inch diagonal backlit color LCD screen and an A/V output that allows the Nomad to be played on a television screen. Design elements of the handheld were made similar to the Game Gear, but included six buttons for full compatibility with later Genesis releases. Also included were a red power switch, headphone jack, volume dial, and separate controller input for multiplayer games. The controller port functions as player 2, so single-player games cannot be played with a Genesis controller. The Nomad can be powered by an AC adapter, a battery recharger known as the Genesis Nomad PowerBack, or six AA batteries, which provide a battery life of two to three hours.

The Nomad is fully compatible with several Genesis peripherals, including the Sega Activator, Team Play Adaptor, Mega Mouse, and the Sega Channel and XBAND network add-ons. However, the Nomad is not compatible with the Power Base Converter, Sega CD, or 32X. This means the Nomad can only play Genesis games, whereas the standard Genesis can also play Master System, Sega CD, and 32X games with the respective add-ons.

== Game library ==
The Nomad does not have its own game library, but instead plays Genesis games. At the time of its launch, the Nomad had over 500 games available for play. However, no pack-in game was included. The Nomad can boot unlicensed, homebrew, and bootleg games made for the Genesis. Some earlier third-party games have compatibility issues when played on the Nomad, but can be successfully played through the use of a Game Genie. Likewise, due to its lack of compatibility with any of the Genesis' add-ons, it is unable to play any games for the Master System, Sega CD, or 32X. The Nomad employs two different regional lockout methods, physical and software, but methods have been found to bypass these.

== Reception and legacy ==
Reviewing the Nomad shortly after launch, Game Players considered the price of $179 "a bit steep", but said it was the best portable system on the market, and recommended it over the stock Genesis since it could play all the same games in a portable format. In a 1997 year-end review, a team of four Electronic Gaming Monthly editors gave the Nomad scores of 8.0, 6.5, 7.0, and 7.5. They praised its support for the entire Genesis library, but criticized its hefty battery usage and noted that despite a recent price drop, it was still expensive enough to discourage interested consumers. While they generally complimented the screen display, they remarked that its small size makes it difficult to play certain games. Sushi-X declared the Nomad the best portable gaming system then on the market, while his three co-reviewers had more misgivings, saying it has merits but might not be a worthwhile buy. However, in their first 1996 review, reviewers from Electronics Gaming Monthly noted that the screen suffers from display motion blur, particularly during fast scrolling.

Blake Snow of GamePro listed the Nomad as fifth on his list of the "10 Worst-Selling Handhelds of All Time", criticizing its poor timing into the market, inadequate advertising, and poor battery life. Scott Alan Marriott of Allgame placed more than simply timing into reasons for the Nomad's lack of sales, stating, "The reason for the Nomad's failure may have very well been a combination of poor timing, company mistrust and the relatively high cost of the machine (without a pack-in). Genesis owners were too skittish to invest in another 16-bit system." Stuart Hunt of Retro Gamer, however, praised the Nomad, saying in a retrospective that Nomad was "the first true 16-bit handheld" and declared it the best variant of the Genesis. He noted the collectability of the Nomad, due to its low production, and stated, "Had Sega cottoned on to the concept of the Nomad before the Mega Drive 2, and rolled it out as a true successor to the Mega Drive ... then perhaps Sega may have succeeded in its original goal to prolong the life of the Mega Drive in the U.S."

== See also ==
- VMU
- List of handheld game consoles
