= Kid Chameleon =

1992 video game

- PAL box art depicting the player character, Kid Chameleon (center), and some of his many alternate forms (top)
- Developer: Sega Technical Institute
- Publisher: Sega
- Director: Graeme Bayless
- Designers: Broderick Macaraeg; Hoyt Ng; Bill Dunn; Steve Woita
- Programmers: Mark Cerny; Steve Woita; Bill Willis; BC. Tchiu Le; Scott Chandler
- Artists: Craig Stitt; Yasushi Yamaguchi; Alan Ackerman; Brenda Ross; Paul Mica
- Composer: Mark Miller
- Platform: Sega Genesis
- Release: NA: March 1992; EU: May 1992; JP: May 29, 1992
- Genre: Platformer
- Modes: Single player, multiplayer

Kid Chameleon (Note: Known in Japan as Chameleon Kid (Japanese: カメレオンキッド, Hepburn: Kamereon Kiddo)) is a 1992 platform game developed and published by Sega for the Sega Genesis. The player controls the "Kid Chameleon" and attempts to save his peers from a virtual reality video game's rogue artificial intelligence. The gameplay involves the player going through a series of levels, in which the goal is to reach a flag at the end. The central mechanic revolves around different forms, obtained from masks, which are used to progress through levels.

The game has been ported to several platforms via game compilations and digital distribution services.

== Gameplay ==
The player character, Kid Chameleon, can obtain masks that allows him to change "forms" and use new abilities, such as climbing walls.

The player controls Kid Chameleon as he progresses through a series of over 100 levels, featuring an array of enemies and obstacles. Most levels contain a flag, which is the primary goal and method of progressing to the next level. However, a number of teleporters throughout the game can warp the player not only to different places within the same level, but also to other levels, and sometimes to an entirely alternate path. There is no password system or other method of saving. As Kid Chameleon moves through the levels, he discovers masks which alter him into different characters. Each character has unique special abilities and varying numbers of hit points. In addition to the offensive abilities of each form, the Kid can also defeat enemies by jumping on them, although he may still take damage from some enemies. Each form can also make use of Diamond Powers that require diamonds to use.

== Release ==
The game is included in the Sega Genesis Collection for the PlayStation 2 and PlayStation Portable. It was released for the Virtual Console in Japan on May 22, 2007, North America on May 28, 2007, and Europe on June 1, 2007. The game has also appeared in Sonic's Ultimate Genesis Collection and the Nintendo Classics service.

== Reception ==
Reception

Aggregate score
Aggregator	Score
GameRankings	SMD: 68%

Review scores
Publication	Score
MegaTech	64%
Sega Force	82%
Console XS	89%
Mega Play	30/40
Manci Games	B+

Mega placed the game at #35 in their Top Mega Drive Games of All Time. MegaTech magazine said it was let down by the lack of challenge. Sega Force gave the game a score of 82% commending the graphics, music and citing similarities to the Mario and Sonic games and stating: “Great platform action, but only for fans of the genre.” Console XS gave Kid Chameleon an overall score of 89/100. They praised the game for having constant variety because of the main character's ability to change forms. The four reviewers of Mega Play gave positive reviews praising the gameplay, calling it "very concise" and commended the levels, the power-ups, graphics and music. They felt that Kid Chameleon was similar to other action games and one reviewer said it "gets to be monotonous after a while." Manci Games praised the graphics, controls and the gameplay and commended the power to swap abilities, saying that specific feature separates the game from what it is inspired by. The reviewer found Kid Chameleon to be similar to Super Mario Bros and the only criticism the reviewer had is the game does not have a save or password system.

== Legacy ==
In 1993, a Kid Chameleon comic strip ran from issues 7–12 in the Fleetway publication Sonic the Comic. A sequel storyline, "Back to UnReality!", ran in 1995 from Issues 54-59. Both stories were written by Michael Cook, with art by Brian Williamson and Steve White.
