= Howard Drossin =

American composer

- Genres: Film music, video game music, electronic, rock, jazz
- Occupations: Musician, composer, arranger
- Instruments: Guitar, piano
- Years active: 1992–present
- Website: howarddrossin.com

Howard Drossin is an American composer for film and video games. Most recently, he has worked with Spike Lee on documentaries and short films. His work includes co-scoring with longtime collaborator RZA, The Man with the Iron Fists for Universal Pictures, starring Russell Crowe and Lucy Liu; several video games including Afro Samurai, Sonic & Knuckles, and Baldur's Gate; a Super Bowl commercial; and orchestration on the Grammy-winning jazz record A Tale of God's Will. He has also worked on albums and musical projects with a wide variety of artists including Terence Blanchard, Rod Stewart, The Black Keys, Beyoncé Knowles, Wiz Khalifa, and Paul Oakenfold.

== Works ==
=== Film and television ===
Year	Title	Notes
1997	Backstreet Boys: Everybody (Backstreet's Back)	Additional music
1999	The Item	Music
2001	The Theory of the Leisure Class	Music
2001	Jane Bond	Music
2002	Barbershop	Orchestrations
2002	25th Hour	Orchestrations
2003	What Boys Like	Music
2004	She Hate Me	Orchestrations
2005	Unleashed	Additional music
2005	Blade: Trinity	Additional music
2005	The Protector	Music
2005	Their Eyes Were Watching God	Orchestrations
2005	All the Invisible Children	Orchestrations
2006	Akeelah and the Bee	Orchestrations
2006	Inside Man	Orchestrations
2006	Waist Deep	Additional music
2007	Talk To Me	Orchestrations
2008	Miracle at St. Anna	Orchestrations
2008	Cadillac Records	Orchestrations
2010	Sidewalk	Music
2010	Bunraku	Orchestrations
2011	Marvel One-Shot: The Consultant	Music with Paul Oakenfold
2011	Marvel One-Shot: A Funny Thing Happened on the Way to Thor's Hammer	Music with Paul Oakenfold
2012	Red Tails	Orchestrations
2012	The Man with the Iron Fists	Music with RZA
2014	Da Sweet Blood of Jesus	Orchestrations
2014	Black or White	Orchestrations
2015	The Man with the Iron Fists 2	Music with RZA
2015	Chi-Raq	Orchestrations
2017	Feud	Orchestrations
2017	She's Gotta Have It	Orchestrations
2018	BlacKkKlansman	Orchestrations
2018	American Crime Story	Orchestrations
2018	Pass Over	Music
2019	Harriet	Orchestrations
2020	Coach: Words Matter	Music
2020	Welcome to Sudden Death	Music
2022	Nike: Seen It All	Music
2024	Italy in America	Music
2025	Highest 2 Lowest	Music

=== Video games ===
Year	Title	Notes
1992	Wolf: True Life Adventure	Music (uncredited)
1993	Sonic Spinball	Music with Barry Blum and Brian Coburn
1994	Sonic & Knuckles	Music with several others
1995	Comix Zone	Music
1995	The Ooze	Music
1996	Die Hard Arcade	Music
1997	Manx TT SuperBike	Music
1998	Dynamite Cop	Music
1998	Vigilante 8	Music with Jeehun Hwang
1999	Wu-Tang: Shaolin Style	Cutscene music
2000	Vigilante 8: Second Offense	Music with Christian Salyer and Eric Klein
2000	Baldur's Gate II: Shadows of Amn	Music with Michael Hoenig
2000	Giants: Citizen Kabuto	Music editing
2000	Star Trek: Starfleet Command II: Empires at War	Music editing
2001	Star Trek: Starfleet Command: Orion Pirates	Music
2001	Alien Front Online	Music with Makito Nomiya
2001	Baldur's Gate II: Throne of Bhaal	Music with Inon Zur
2009	Sonic and the Black Knight	Music with Jun Senoue, Tommy Tallarico, Richard Jacques and others
2009	Afro Samurai	Music
2010	Splatterhouse	Music
2013	Baldur's Gate II: Enhanced Edition	Music editing
—	Astropede / Segapede	Music (unreleased)
—	Sonic X-treme	Music (unreleased)
