= Sega Technical Institute =

Video game developer

- Type: Division
- Industry: Video games
- Founded: January 1990; 36 years ago
- Founder: Mark Cerny
- Defunct: 1996; 30 years ago
- Fate: Closed
- Headquarters: Palo Alto and Redwood City, California, United States
- Key people: Mark Cerny; Roger Hector; Yuji Naka
- Parent: Sega of America

Sega Technical Institute (STI) was an American video game developer owned by Sega. Founded by the Atari veteran Mark Cerny in 1990, STI sought to combine elite Japanese developers, including the Sonic Team programmer Yuji Naka and his team, with new American talent. STI developed games for Sega Genesis, including several Sonic the Hedgehog games, before it was closed at the end of 1996.

After working in Japan for Sega on games for the Master System, Cerny proposed the creation of a development studio in America, which was approved. When Naka quit Sega after the release of Sonic the Hedgehog, Cerny convinced him to join STI. After completing Sonic the Hedgehog 2 in 1992, STI was divided in two due to friction between the Japanese and American developers: the Japanese developed Sonic the Hedgehog 3 and Sonic & Knuckles before leaving in 1994, while the Americans developed games including Sonic Spinball. The failed development of Sonic X-treme for the Sega Saturn became representative of a culture shift at Sega.

The mainline Sonic the Hedgehog games developed by STI are considered significant in the history of the Genesis. Developers have described STI as a unique workplace that did not fit into Sega's corporate structure.

== History ==
=== Formation, Dick Tracy, and Kid Chameleon ===
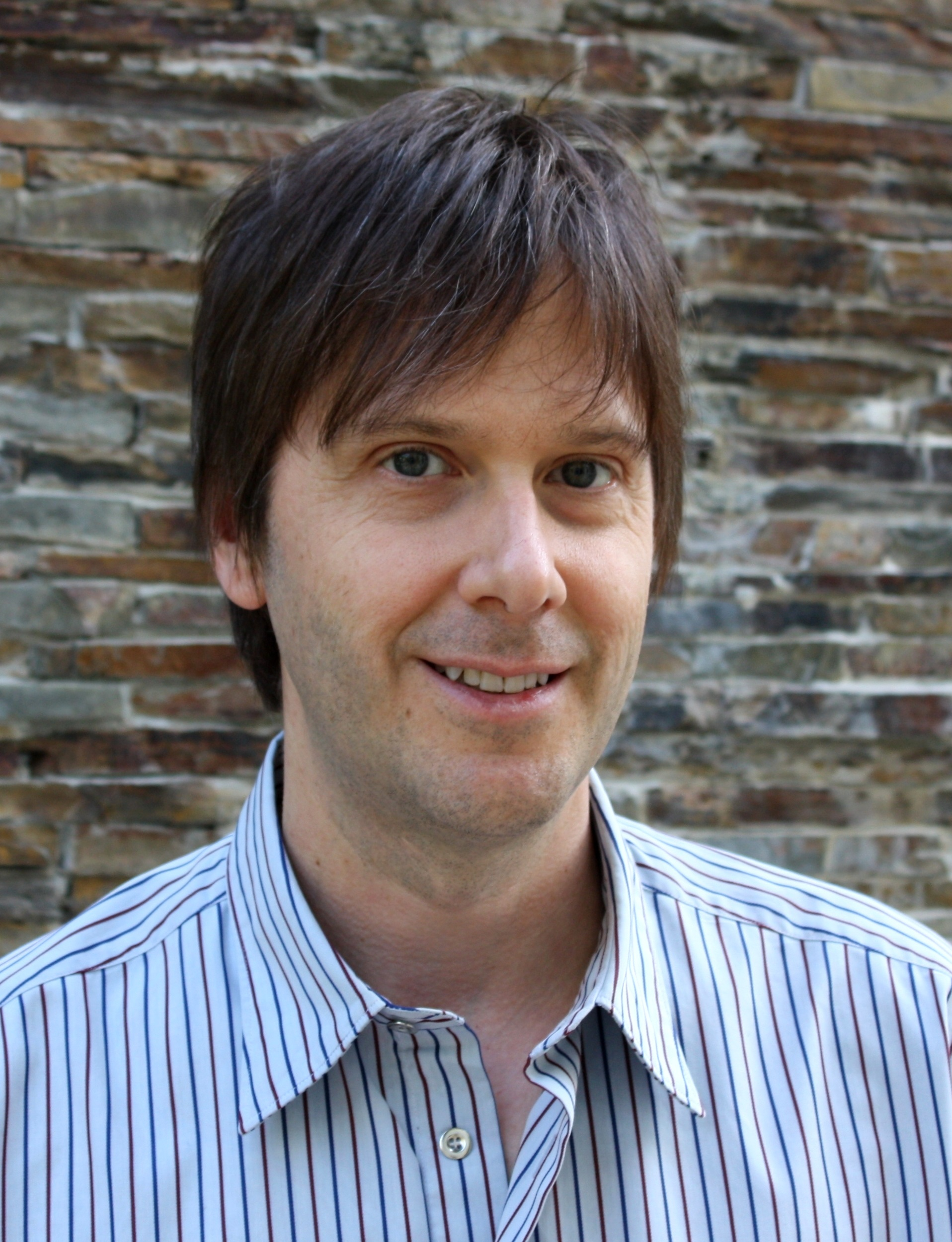
Mark Cerny, founder of Sega Technical Institute

Mark Cerny, a fan of computer programming and arcade games, joined Atari in 1982 aged 17. At 18, he designed and co-programmed Marble Madness, his first major success. After his time with Atari, Cerny became an independent programmer and signed a contract with Sega in 1985 to work on an arcade game out of an office at the company's arcade division in San Jose, California. Cerny was approached by Sega's president, Hayao Nakayama, about canceling his project and coming to Japan to work on software for Sega's upcoming Master System console. Cerny relocated to Tokyo in late 1986. There, he developed Master System products, including launch games and the SegaScope 3D glasses accessory. Despite initially planning on a six-month stay, he worked with Sega in Japan for over three years.

In 1990, Cerny desired to return to the United States. At the same time, the Sega of America CEO, Michael Katz, and the executive vice president, Shinobu Toyoda, prioritized increasing game development in the US due to a lack of games catering to American tastes. This resulted in Sega's head of research and development, Hisashi Suzuki, announcing his intention to send a group of younger, but experienced, arcade developers to the US to develop games for the region, and would be supplemented with American development staff as well. Suzuki wanted to call this new studio the "Sega Institute of Technology" (SIT), but was convinced by Cerny to change the name to "Sega Technical Institute" over concerns that the "s" sound in the group's initials would be pronounced instead with a "sh" by Japanese speakers. Sega initially planned to send 11 developers. Sega applied for O-1 expert visas, for "nationally or internationally recognized" people with "a record of extraordinary achievement", unaware that the developers did not qualify. As a result of the applications for this quantity of unqualified visas, the US Embassy in Tokyo denied them all and temporarily barred Sega from applying for more. Sega instead sent Cerny to the US and had him hire Americans without assistance from Japan.

Believing it would bolster creativity, Cerny located STI near the arcade division offices in San Jose, away from Sega of America's headquarters in San Francisco. Within a year, STI had outgrown its space and relocated to Palo Alto. Ken Balthaser, Sega of America's product development manager, did not support STI's independence and wanted it to be part of Sega of America's corporate structure. He was overruled by Nakayama, who was convinced by Cerny that he could make this level of independence work, something which had never been tried at a major game developer before. This allowed Cerny to report directly to Sega's offices in Japan and avoid the game concept approval management of Sega of America. He aimed to establish an elite development studio that would combine the design philosophies of American and Japanese developers, much like Suzuki's original plan.

Cerny's first employee at STI was Yutaka Sugano, who had previously created the arcade game Shinobi and had already been assigned to work in the US. The first STI project was Dick Tracy, based on the 1990 film for which Sega obtained a license to develop a game. Sega gave STI five months to complete development, while STI still had only Cerny and Sugano on staff. American staff were hired to program the game, and Japanese graphic artist Takeshi Doi worked on the animation. According to the game's lead programmer, Mike Schwartz, the Japanese and American staff collaborated well despite the language barrier; Sugano and Doi had some understanding of English, and Cerny, a fluent speaker of Japanese, helped to ensure good communication. Sega also sent American staff members, including Schwartz, to Japan to visit Sega's headquarters, with Sugano and Doi leading their tour. Despite STI's efforts, which included having each character's likeness approved by their actor in the movie–including Warren Beatty, Madonna, and Al Pacino–Dick Tracy was poorly received and did not sell well. The game's late release in February 1991, eight months after the film debuted in theaters and two months after its home video release, prompted Sega to insist on being a part of film-based projects at least a year before the film's release date.

STI began development on its next game, Kid Chameleon, in 1991, as they were finishing Dick Tracy. Cerny and others conceived Kid Chameleon in 1990 as an action game, with knowledge that such games were popular due to the success of Nintendo's Super Mario Bros. and that the Genesis lacked many of these games, and among the few it did have, none were originally developed in the West. A number of new staff were hired as Kid Chameleon's development began. The team consisted of 15 people, all American, with sound being outsourced to a third party. Cerny facilitated open communication during the game's development and created opportunities for the developers to bond and spend their off time together; this led to increased communication between artists, designers, and programmers, which was crucial because the game's development did not use version control to prevent overwriting the work of each other. The game includes over 100 levels despite the small 1MB cartridge used, but does not include any save feature. Kid Chameleon was released in late 1992 and sold well for Sega.

=== Yuji Naka, Sonic the Hedgehog 2, and Cerny's departure ===
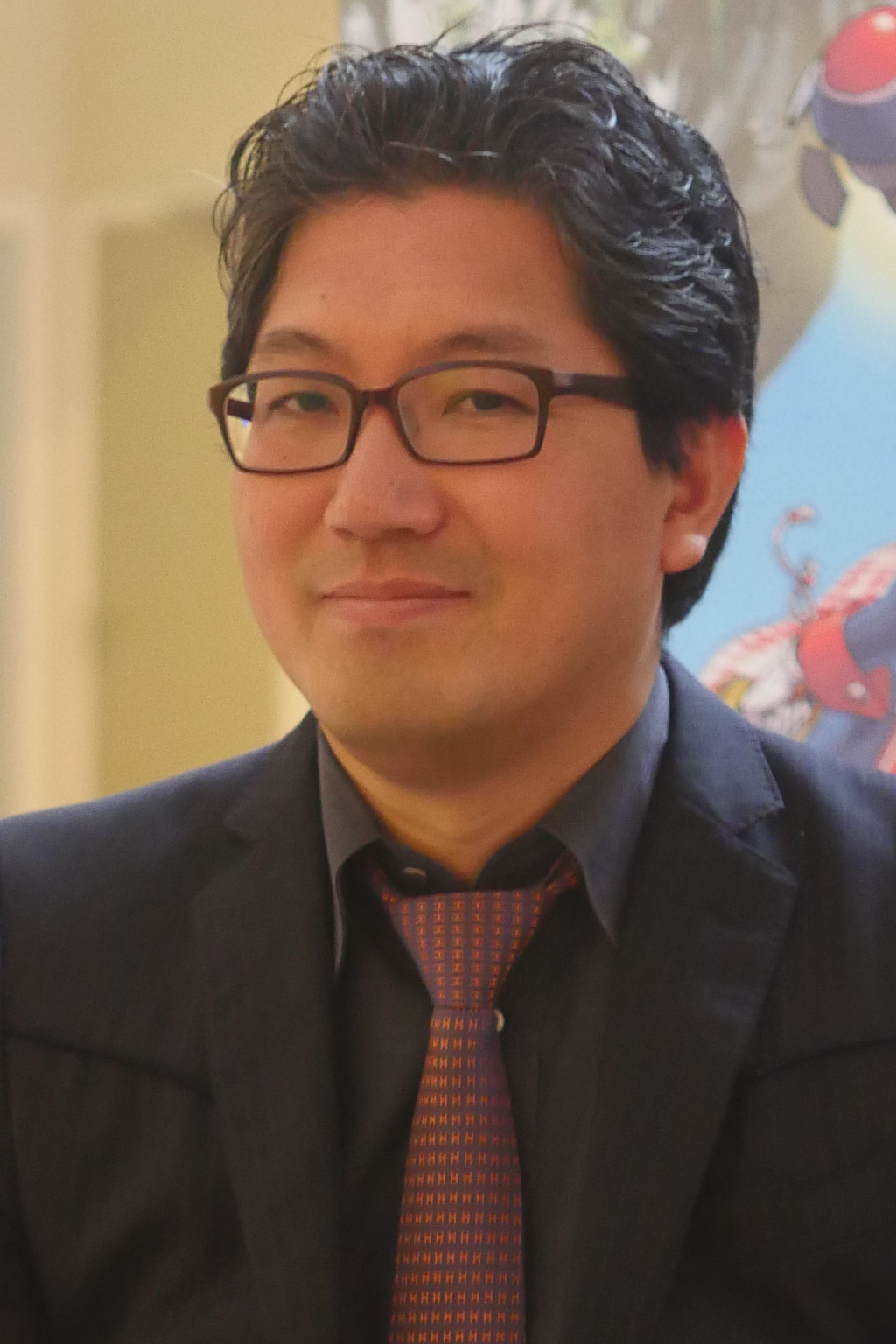
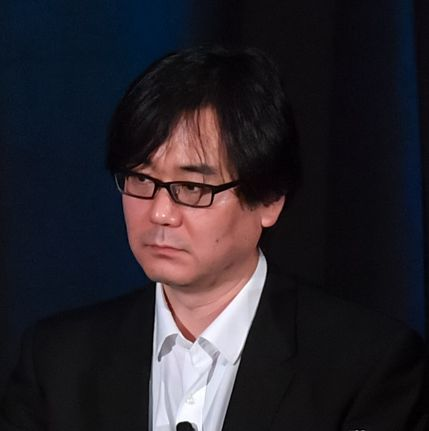
Yuji Naka (left) and Hirokazu Yasuhara (right), programmer and designer of Sonic the Hedgehog and later three Sonic games developed at STI

Shortly after the release of Sonic the Hedgehog in 1991, the Sonic Team programmer Yuji Naka quit Sega following disagreements over salary and backlash from the company over the time and effort it had taken to finish developing the game. Cerny, who had been making frequent trips to Japan while he was setting up STI, and who had previously consulted with Sonic character artist Naoto Ohshima, visited Naka's apartment and listened to the reasons why he left. Cerny took this information to Sega of America executive Shinobu Toyoda, who had previously negotiated Naka's salary while in Japan. As a result, Naka relocated to join STI four months later, at double his original salary and additional bonuses. Hirokazu Yasuhara, who had designed most of the Sonic stages and gameplay, had been assigned shortly before the completion of Sonic to work in the US, and he also joined STI.

In September 1991, Cerny pitched Sonic the Hedgehog 2 as STI's project for the 1992 Christmas season, giving the team 11 months of development time, but Sega management considered it too soon for a sequel. STI explored other concepts, but in November, Sega reversed course and told Cerny that it needed Sonic 2 for the 1992 holiday season. Cerny said that this did not create "much of a creative loss", as STI had yet to come up with a game idea on par with Sonic, but lost two months of development. STI began development on Sonic 2 with a team composed of both American and Japanese developers. Over 100 people worked on the game and the main team comprised 20 developers.

Sega of America marketing director Al Nilsen said that STI wanted "to go all out" to ensure Sonic 2 would be as successful as the original Sonic, since sequels were generally not well regarded. Its development suffered some setbacks; the language barrier and cultural differences created a rift between the Japanese and American developers. The Japanese were used to crunch conditions, with Cerny noting they often worked through the night and slept in their cubicles. In contrast, the Americans left at the end of their working day and locked the STI offices. Cerny had envisioned the Japanese acting as mentors to the Americans, but cooperation was difficult due to language barriers and cultural differences. STI artist Craig Stitt recalled Yasuhara and lead artist Yasushi Yamaguchi as easy to work with, but Naka as "an arrogant pain in the ass" not interested in working with Americans. Another STI artist, Tim Skelly, said that Naka would have been happier working with an all-Japanese team. Cerny said of the situation, "Sonic 2 did ship but after that we said 'no more!'" Upon release, Sonic the Hedgehog 2 broke video game sales records; in November 1993, it was reported to be the best-selling 16-bit video game ever at the time.

During 1992, Cerny left STI; he claimed to have done so as development on Sonic 2 was being completed. Masaharu Yoshii temporarily filled in as the head of the studio and was credited as Sonic 2's director. Cerny's reasons for leaving included Nakayama's disapproval of Cerny's spending before Dick Tracy and Kid Chameleon were released, Cerny's refusal to create games with small development teams in short time frames as was commonly done with Master System games, and the rising tension between the American and Japanese staff of STI. In particular, Cerny felt that the Americans were not treated respectfully by the Japanese. Further complicating this was STI's involvement with the Sonic franchise and Naka's desire to oversee the process personally, as well as Sega of America's initial hesitation to assist given their lack of confidence in the character. After Sonic 2 was completed, Naka refused to develop another Sonic game if he had to work with an American team again.

=== Internal tension and more Sonic games ===
Cerny's replacement at STI was Atari and Electronic Arts veteran Roger Hector. Having been recruited by Toyoda to join STI while working with Disney Interactive, Hector knew Cerny and met with him as he was departing. According to Hector, he knew what Cerny had done at STI and wanted to maintain that status quo as long as he could. Believing the tension between the Japanese and Americans at STI was normal, Hector adapted his management style in order to keep the two teams together while integrating them when it was needed by the game being developed.

STI maintained its unusual place in Sega's organizational structure during Hector's tenure. According to Hector, STI reported both to Sega's Japanese headquarters and Sega of America, but was independent and did not fit into corporate structure. After Sonic 2 was released, Sega relocated STI to Redwood City, closer to Sega of America's headquarters. The idea behind such a move was to more closely connect STI with Sega of America's product development department, but the move worried Hector that STI's special status would be in danger. Hector ensured this status would be retained, reporting directly to Toyoda at Sega of America while still being allowed to avoid Sega of America's pitch and review processes. Employees at the new STI building were also given key access exclusive to them. Hector credited this unusual arrangement for fostering creativity and making STI "very special". Developers Peter Morawiec and Adrian Stephens, who worked for STI, expressed fond memories of working there for its uniqueness.

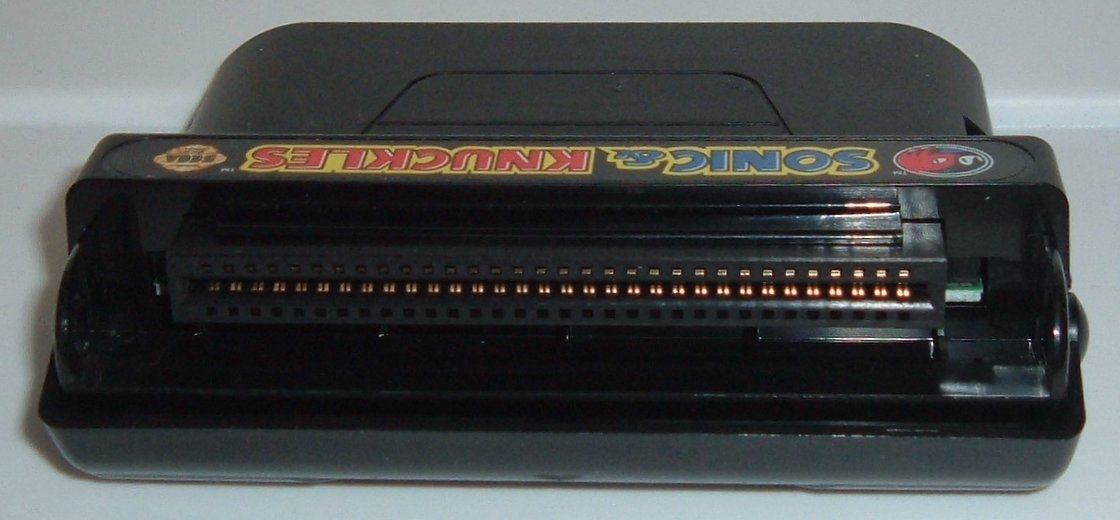
The Sonic & Knuckles cartridge features a "lock-on" adapter that allows it to be physically attached to other Genesis cartridges.

In 1993, STI began work on Sonic the Hedgehog 3. Naka selected the majority of the team, while Hector oversaw development. Due to the game's scope and Sega's commitment to the start date of a corresponding American McDonald's Happy Meal promotion and TV ad campaign, the team split the game in half, with Sonic 3 released in February 1994 and Sonic & Knuckles in October. Sonic & Knuckles was released with "lock-on technology" to connect the two games and allow them to be played together as originally intended. Both games were developed in Palo Alto before STI relocated. Hector said Sonic 3 had a troubled development. He recalled having to prevent the rest of Sega from bothering the team while simultaneously making sure the game would be finished in time. Additionally, Hector struggled to balance resources between Sonic 3 and other projects, Naka was sometimes seen as a harsh leader, and American staff not on the Sonic 3 team became jealous of the priority given to the game. To facilitate better communication, Hector brought in a Berlitz language teacher to instruct a class in Japanese. Some Americans did contribute to the development; artist Chris Senn contributed concept art for Sonic & Knuckles, and Howard Drossin contributed the soundtrack for the game.

Because Sonic 3 was not scheduled to be released for the 1993 holiday season, Sega was interested in a spinoff Sonic game. Sega's marketing team suggested a game based on the casino levels of the first two games. A pinball game pitch came from Morawiec, who had previously worked on the special stages in Sonic 2. Morawiec drew inspiration from the 1992 Amiga game Pinball Dreams to combine pinball mechanics with the gameplay of Sonic the Hedgehog. His team, consisting of American STI staff not working on Sonic 3, was given nine months to develop the game, which Morawiec considered a "tight" schedule. To speed up production, Sega sent veteran staff from Japan to assist, including Sonic the Hedgehog artist Katsuhiko Sato. Additionally, Hector hired more programmers and assured his team that the game would be done on time. The team also changed the programming language from assembly to C, an unusual choice for Genesis games at the time, which greatly accelerated development at the cost of frame rate and performance and optimization issues. A last-minute difficulty occurred when the team learned that Sega did not own the theme to Sonic the Hedgehog, which had been used in Spinball. Morawiec tasked lead composer Drossin to write a new theme within two hours. Though it received poor reviews, Sonic Spinball sold well.

=== Naka's departure, Comix Zone, The Ooze, and Die Hard Arcade ===
Following the release of Sonic & Knuckles, Yasuhara quit, citing differences with Naka, and went on to develop games for Sega of America. Naka returned to Japan in late 1994 to continue work with Sonic Team, reuniting with Ohshima. STI was left with mostly American staff. Further complications came from internal corporate tension: Sega of America operated as an independent entity, and relations with the Japanese were not always smooth. Former Sega of America CEO Tom Kalinske claimed some executives disliked that Nakayama appeared to favor US executives, and "a lot of the Japanese executives were maybe a little jealous, and I think some of that played into the decisions that were made". By contrast, author Steven L. Kent wrote that Nakayama bullied American executives and believed the Japanese executives made the best decisions. According to Hector, after the release of the Sony PlayStation in 1994, the atmosphere at Sega became political, with "lots of finger-pointing".

STI's next game, Comix Zone, entered development before Sonic Spinball but was placed on hold so Morawiec could work on Spinball. After presenting his concept to Hector, Morawiec was encouraged to pitch it directly to Kalinske, who approved and gave his approval again after Spinball was released. Development began with a three-man team of Morawiec designing, Adrian Stephens programming, and executive producer Dean Lester, but grew to a team of nearly a dozen. Development was relatively smooth and became STI's top project, with the full support of Sega's marketing department, but pressure was mounting as the American team had not released a game since Spinball. Timing became a factor with the forthcoming release of new video game consoles, the 32X and Sega Saturn. As a result, Comix Zone was delayed to the beginning of 1995 and two levels were cut. Morawiec also increased the game's difficulty on recommendation of Sega's test department, a decision he later regretted. Comix Zone was released to mixed reviews and saw limited sales, and according to Stephens did not break even, but later attracted a cult following. Stephens also said that the game's late release delayed STI's movement to developing Saturn software, and that "neither STI nor the Saturn ever recovered from that."

The Ooze entered development in 1994, stemming from an algorithm by programmer David Sanner. The game's approval was questionable due to its being unconventional and its main character being made of toxic sludge, and was not guaranteed to ship. The game's main artist and designer was Stieg Hedlund, who took over after the original designer left. Hedlund considered The Ooze a great opportunity and worked to move the game along and made the game's first stage to teach players how to play. Though marketing wanted to change the look of The Ooze to a more cartoon-based design, the game's art director refused, fearing it would change the tone of the game. Progress was later hampered with the departure of programmer Scott Chandler and artist Marte Thompson. Sega's marketing considered bundling The Ooze as a pack-in with the forthcoming Genesis Nomad, but the coordination never happened. Released late in the Genesis' active years, The Ooze sold below Sega's expectations and was a critical and commercial failure. Those who developed the game, however, consider it the last truly independent game STI developed without outside interference.

STI completed one game in partnership with Sega AM1, Die Hard Arcade. The game originated as a means for Sega to use existing resources: Sega had produced an excess inventory of ST-V arcade boards, and had acquired the Die Hard license but as yet had no Die Hard games in development. To develop the game, Sega sent over a group of artists, programmers, and designers to STI, who supplied additional artists, music, and animation. Die Hard Arcade became Sega's most successful arcade game produced in the US, and helped the arcade division to sell off the excess inventory.

=== Sonic X-treme ===
As Sonic Team was working on Nights into Dreams, Sega tasked STI with developing what would have been the first fully 3D Sonic game, Sonic X-treme. Development of Sonic X-treme began in late 1994 at STI. Hector conceived a Genesis game based on the Saturday morning Sonic the Hedgehog cartoon, and took developers from Sonic Team and STI to the DiC Animation studios to demonstrate his idea, with Morawiec later designing gameplay. However, Sega management and senior members of Sonic Team disapproved of the idea, so Morawiec moved on to work on Comix Zone. As new consoles and the 32-bit era were on the way, the game was moved to the 32X and Michael Kosaka was placed in charge of the team. He created design documents for the game, but resigned in the middle of 1995 due to corporate politics. Executive producer Dean Lester resigned later in 1995, with Manny Granillo taking over as executive producer and STI producer Mike Wallis being placed in charge of development. Wallis stated that he had little to no control over his team despite supervising it because of the organizational structure. During this phase in development, STI was asked by Sega of America management to evaluate developing the game for a forthcoming new console based on Nvidia Riva TNT technology.

After Sega announced that it would focus solely on the Sega Saturn, development shifted to the Saturn. This cost the STI development team several weeks. The new game design featured a fisheye lens camera system that rotated levels with Sonic's movement. In March 1996, Sega representatives from Japan including CEO Nakayama visited STI to evaluate progress. At this point, X-treme was already well behind schedule, with the main game running poorly. After seeing the boss battles performing better during the demonstration, Nakayama ordered the game be reworked using that engine instead. This effectively removed the main game development and removed their developers, designer Chris Senn and programmer Ofer Alon, from the project. They would later try to develop a version of X-treme for PC, but it was rejected on the same grounds of quality and performance issues. On the Saturn project, the developers worked between 16 and 20 hours a day to meet their December 1996 deadline. This proved fruitless after Sega of America executive vice president Bernie Stolar rescinded STI's access to Sonic Team's Nights into Dreams engine following an ultimatum by Naka, who was now producing Nights and reportedly threatened to quit Sega if STI used it. In July 2022, Naka denied ever threatening to quit, but clarified that STI would never have been able to use the engine due to them working in C, and there being no documentation they could use to understand how to develop with the NiGHTS engine. The loss of the Nights engine cost the team a further two weeks of development time. After programmer Chris Coffin became severely ill with pneumonia, Wallis made the decision to cancel the game. X-treme was announced as delayed, but was officially canceled in early 1997.

=== Closure and canceled games ===
STI was disbanded in 1996 as a result of changes in management at Sega of America. New focuses were given to STI, including product localization and management of external development teams. According to Hector, corporate politics and fighting amongst the executives could not be rectified. Hector had been given additional responsibilities over all of Sega's product development, leading to his decision to leave the company. New management had taken over shortly before the studio closed. Decisions were made to streamline game development, and Sega of America's product development department branched to form SegaSoft. With STI's recent new responsibilities, it was restructured to report directly to Sega of America and became the new product development department. After STI's closure, Morawiec and Stephens left Sega and formed Luxoflux. Cerny and Yasuhara remained friends after their time at STI and reunited to work with Naughty Dog on the Jak & Daxter series.

In addition to Sonic X-treme, several games were considered but ultimately never developed. A sequel to Kid Chameleon and Jester, which featured a nearly-invulnerable clay character, were canceled due to STI shifting resources to Sonic the Hedgehog 2. Another, Spinny & Spike, was developed by Kid Chameleon programmer Steve Woita and greenlit by Kalinske, but never made it out of development after resources shifted to Sonic Spinball. Sega hired a new producer and art programmer to continue Spinny & Spike. Woita assumed he would return to the game after finishing Spinball, but opted to leave Sega shortly afterward, and Sega determined that development could not continue without the original team. A sequel to Comix Zone was proposed but dropped, while Morawiec and Stephens set up an office to begin work on an original Sonic game, but the project was canceled by Naka.

== Game reception ==
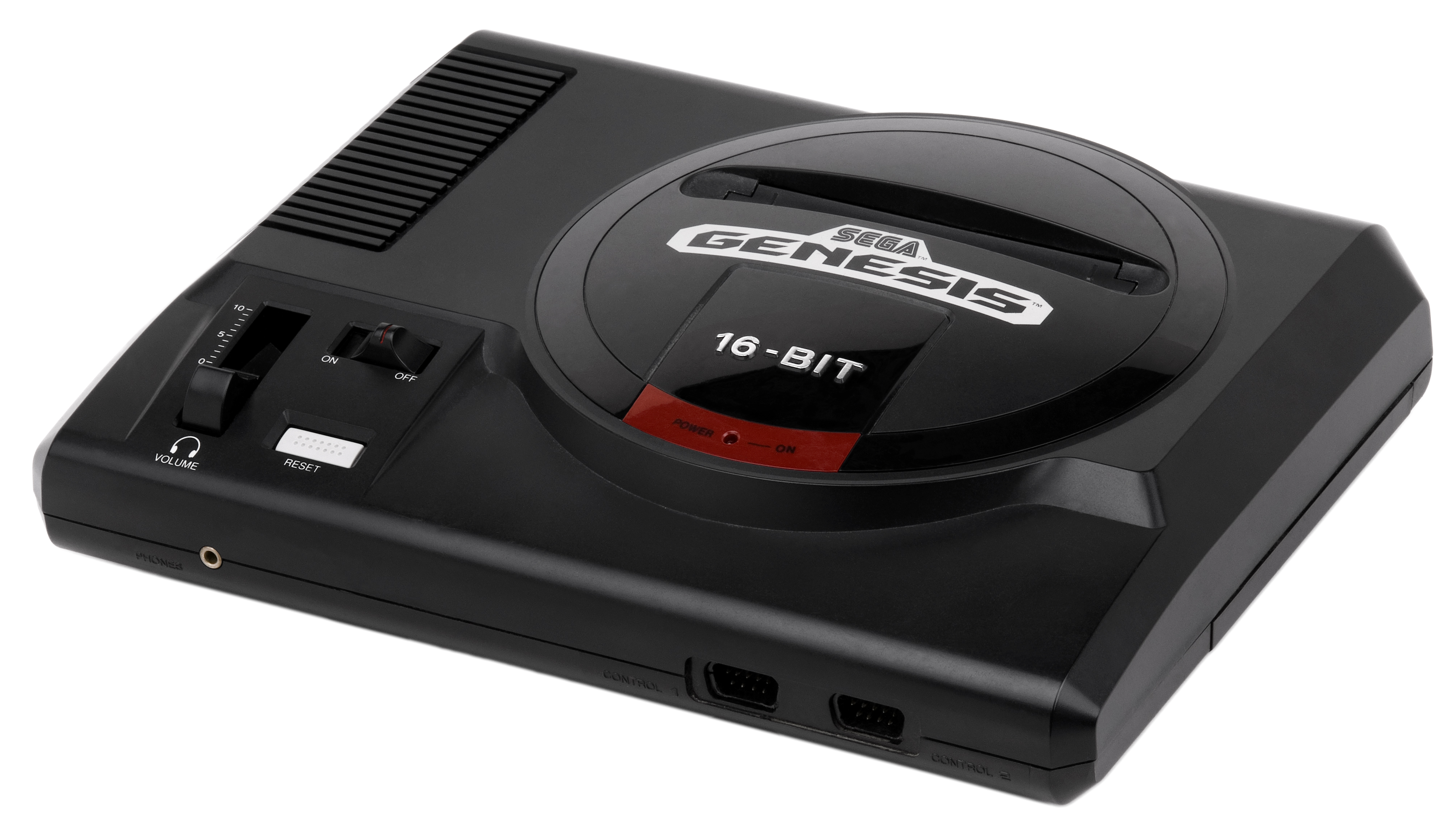
Retrospectively, STI's games have been considered important to the Sega Genesis.

Games developed by STI include four Sonic the Hedgehog games. Sonic the Hedgehog 2 received critical acclaim and was a bestseller in the UK charts for 2 months. As of 2006, the game had sold over 6 million copies. Sonic Spinball received mixed reviews, with an average score of 61% at GameRankings, based on an aggregate score of six reviews, but sold well. Sonic the Hedgehog 3 holds an average score of 89% at GameRankings, indicating positive reviews based on its aggregate score of five reviews, while Sonic & Knuckles also received positive reviews. All four games have been rereleased multiple times in various Sonic compilations.

Kid Chameleon is recognized for its original character designs and abilities that made it play like "several different platform games rolled into one. Mega placed the game at #35 in their Top Mega Drive Games of All Time. Comix Zone, a beat 'em up, faced mixed reviews from GamePro and Electronic Gaming Monthly at the time of its release, but has been retrospectively praised for its originality, including the concept of moving through the pages of a comic book and defeating enemies drawn in front of the player. The Ooze, originally planned as a Genesis Nomad launch title, received negative reviews at its launch, but was recognized for its originality, and has been retrospectively called "one of those little-known 16-bit gems that are well worth taking the effort to play through." Die Hard Arcade has also been recognized for its depth as one of the last beat 'em ups. While it was never released, journalists have considered what impact Sonic X-treme, as a Sonic game for the Sega Saturn, may have had on the market.

Retrospectively, STI is given more credit for its game development than it had while it was active. More Sonic compilations have featured games developed by STI, and Sega has since opened more external studios outside of Japan. Ashley Day of Retro Gamer stated, "only time will tell if such companies can harness the same kind of magic the Sega Technical Institute did so long ago." Ken Horowitz of Sega-16 stressed the importance of STI's games on the Genesis, and also framed STI's history as a cautionary tale of corporate politics. Of this, Horowitz said, "Be it the continued growth and success of the core Sonic games, the innovative original titles, or the unique development atmosphere that was unrivaled anywhere else at Sega, the Institute gave us some great games and produced some amazing talent. Today’s industry would do well to take a page from Sega’s book about how to make a development team feel at home, and the story of the Sega Technical Institute is living proof of how too much corporate interference can kill a good thing."

Game	Year released	STI development team
Dick Tracy	1991	American
Kid Chameleon	1992	American
Sonic the Hedgehog 2	1992	Both
Sonic Spinball	1993	American
Sonic the Hedgehog 3	1994	Japanese
Sonic & Knuckles	1994	Japanese
Comix Zone	1995	American
The Ooze	1995	American
Die Hard Arcade (with Sega AM1)	1996	American
Sonic X-treme	Canceled	American

== See also ==
- Sega development studios
- Sega AM2
- Sega AM3
