= The Ooze =

1995 Sega Genesis video game

- Developer: Sega Technical Institute
- Publisher: Sega
- Producer: Michael Wallis
- Designers: Stieg Hedlund; Jason Kuo; Dave Sanner
- Programmers: Dave Sanner; Jason Plumb; Scott Chandler
- Writer: Dave Sanner
- Composer: Howard Drossin
- Platform: Sega Genesis
- Release: NA: September 1995; JP: September 22, 1995; EU: February 2, 1996
- Genre: Action-adventure
- Mode: Single-player

The Ooze is a video game developed by Sega Technical Institute and released in 1995 for the Genesis. In the game, players take the role of a slimy puddle of liquid and face off against various enemies and obstacles.

== Gameplay and plot ==
Gameplay screenshot

The game starts at a chemical plant known as "The Corporation," with scientist Dr. Daniel Caine sneaking into the research lab where he worked, in order to find evidence that crimes were being committed using a toxic gas he created. Caine discovers that his colleagues are planning "Operation: Omega": a plan to release a plague upon the populace, and make a fortune because they hold the only cure. However, the Director of The Corporation discovers Caine in the lab. Caine is disposed of by means of chemical waste, but the chemicals do not kill him; instead, they alter him into the angry, sentient, formless creature known as "The Ooze". Swearing revenge, the doctor seeks two things: to stop his former colleagues plan using his Ooze form’s powers, and to assume his human form once again. He must now find the DNA helices scattered throughout the wasteland or else end up imprisoned in the Director's lava lamp.

Players control Dr. Caine as a puddle of ooze with a head, who can move around and use two attacks. One is stretching out a maneuverable sliver of ooze whose length is only limited by how much ooze he currently has to attack. Players can also spit gobs of ooze, which reduces the size of the ooze. Enemy attacks deplete the size of the ooze puddle as well, and the Ooze will die either if he becomes very small or if his head is attacked directly. He can also die by dropping off the edges of certain areas, or staying on a drain for too long. Numerous puzzles must be completed in order to progress from one level to another. An optional goal of the game is finding and collecting all 50 helices, in order to see the game's good ending.

== Development and releases ==
Dave Sanner of Sega Technical Institute, who was also behind the game Sonic Spinball, came up with the concept for The Ooze and was its lead programmer. The game's main artist and designer was Stieg Hedlund, who took over after the original designer left. Hedlund considered The Ooze a great opportunity and worked to move the game along and made the game's first stage to teach players how to play. Though marketing wanted to change the look of The Ooze to a more cartoon-based design, the game's art director refused, fearing it would change the tone of the game. Progress was later hampered with the departure of programmer Scott Chandler and artist Marte Thompson.

Sega's marketing department considered bundling The Ooze as a pack-in game with the Genesis Nomad, a handheld version of the Genesis; however, this did not occur. The Ooze was released in Japan on September 22, 1995, and in North America the same month, with a European release in December. The game was later included as a built-in game for the Arcade Legends Sega Genesis 2 and in the compilation game Sonic Mega Collection Plus. It is also unlockable in the Japanese version of Sonic Mega Collection.

== Reception ==
Reception

Aggregate score
Aggregator	Score
GameRankings	39%

Review scores
Publication	Score
AllGame	4/5
Electronic Gaming Monthly	4.5/10, 3.5/10, 3/10, 4.5/10
Famitsu	7/10, 5/10, 5/10, 6/10
Game Informer	6.75/10
GamePro	8.5/20
Joypad	70%
Next Generation	3/5
Game Players	64%
Player One	82%
MEGA Force	84%
Mean Machines Sega	79/100

The Ooze received mostly negative reviews. The four reviewers of Electronic Gaming Monthly gave the game 3.875 out of ten, commenting that while The Ooze is highly original, the graphics are choppy and the increasing difficulty as the ooze grows makes the game frustrating, slow-paced and generally not fun. Next Generation similarly said: "After the originality wears off, the game becomes quite blah." Arguing that the game's attempt at an original approach should nonetheless be commended, they gave it three out of five stars. Reviewing for GamePro, Johnny Ballgame gave faint praise to the music and sound effects, but slammed the controls as poor and the gameplay as tedious. He concluded: "Oozing with mediocrity, this game never delivers anything worthwhile or worth buying." Mike Salmon of Game Players shared the same sentiments about the gameplay while appreciating the sound effects, but offered praise for the game's uniqueness.

Game Informer gave the game an overall score of 6.75 out of ten, stating: “The Ooze is a game unlike any other, with unique control and story line.”

In a retrospective review, Allgame gave it a score of four out of five. The reviewer said the game is unique and clever, and praised the heavy techno pop music and realistic sound effects for complementing the game’s atmosphere and level themes. He criticized the graphics as dull and uninteresting and said the game does not truly stand out, yet is still worthwhile, concluding: "It's just a quietly original, unassuming little game that you'll find yourself playing more often than you may have originally intended."

== See also ==
- Snake (video game)
