= Sonic Spinball =

1993 video game

Sonic the Hedgehog Spinball
- US cover art by Greg Martin
- Developer: Sega Technical Institute (Note: Ported to Game Gear and Master System by Sega Interactive Development Division)
- Publisher: Sega
- Producer: Yutaka Sugano
- Designers: Peter Morawiec; Hoyt Ng
- Artist: John Duggan
- Composers: Howard Drossin; Brian Coburn; Barry Blum
- Series: Sonic the Hedgehog
- Platforms: Sega Genesis, Game Gear, Master System
- Release: November 23, 1993: Sega Genesis; WW: November 23, 1993; JP: December 10, 1993 Game Gear; EU: August 1994; NA: September 1994 Master System; EU: January 27, 1995
- Genre: Pinball
- Modes: Single-player, multiplayer

Sonic Spinball, also known as Sonic the Hedgehog Spinball, is a 1993 pinball video game developed by Sega Technical Institute and published by Sega for the Sega Genesis. It is a spin-off of the Sonic the Hedgehog series. Players control Sonic the Hedgehog, who must stop Doctor Robotnik from enslaving the population in a giant pinball-like mechanism. The game is set in a series of pinball machine-like environments with Sonic acting as the pinball.

It was developed by the American staff of Sega Technical Institute, as the Japanese staff was occupied with developing Sonic the Hedgehog 3 and Sonic & Knuckles. When Sega management realized that Sonic 3 would not be completed in time for the 1993 holiday shopping season, they commissioned another Sonic game. After a hasty nine-month development, Sonic Spinball was released for the Sega Genesis in November 1993, with ports for the Game Gear and Master System releasing in 1994 and 1995 respectively.

Sonic Spinball received mixed reviews, with critics praising the novelty and graphics but criticizing the controls. A second pinball game, Sonic Pinball Party, was released in 2003, and a Sonic Spinball spinning rollercoaster opened in Alton Towers theme park, in 2010. Spinball has been ported to various consoles and included in Sega compilations.

== Gameplay ==
At the top, the interface displays the player's number of lives and total score. In the game, Sonic the Hedgehog acts as a pinball.

Sonic Spinball is a pinball game in which the player controls Sonic the Hedgehog, who acts as the pinball. The majority of the game takes place within the "Pinball Defense System", which resembles a series of large pinball machines. The game comprises four levels, each containing numerous flippers that can be used to aim Sonic's trajectory and launch him through the level. Sonic can be maneuvered while airborne with input from the directional pad, which can be used for better positioning following an impact with a bumper or target or when Sonic is descending toward the drain, bumpers, or flippers.

The goal of each level is to collect all the Chaos Emeralds and subsequently defeat the newly accessible boss located at the top of the level. Some Chaos Emeralds are blocked off by obstacles that require Sonic to hit certain switches or bumpers in order to create a clear path. The boss at the top of each level requires a specific strategy to defeat. A "status strip" at the top of the screen provides hints for defeating bosses, as well as encouraging messages when the player makes progress. The strip also tells the player how many Chaos Emeralds are left to collect in a level. Following the defeat of an boss enemy, a bonus round is initiated. These rounds are shown as Sonic playing a regular pinball machine. The player is given three balls to shoot around the board, the object being to accumulate points by hitting as many bumpers and targets as possible. At any point in the bonus round, the player may trigger a tilt shake that rattles the table and affects the ball's trajectory. If the tilt shake is used too often, however, all flippers will lock out, leaving the ball to fall down the drain. When the goal of the bonus round is fulfilled, or if all three balls fall through the flippers, the bonus round will end, and the next level will begin. When all the game's Chaos Emeralds are collected and all four boss enemies are defeated, the player wins.

Sonic starts the game with three lives. A life is lost when Sonic falls through a drain. An extra life can be earned by accumulating 20,000,000 points, which can be accumulated by hitting bumpers, navigating through loops, collecting rings, and destroying enemy characters.

== Plot ==
The game takes place in the universe of the Sonic the Hedgehog TV series. The evil scientist Doctor Robotnik has built a fortress on top of a volcano to transform the animals of planet Mobius into robot slaves. The volcano's magma fuels the fortress and the pinball machine-like defense systems. The volcano is kept in stable condition with Chaos Emeralds. Sonic the Hedgehog and his friend Tails mount an aerial assault on the fortress. Sonic is knocked into the waters that surround the volcano, but surfaces in the caves below the fortress. He infiltrates the defenses, absconds with the Chaos Emeralds, and frees the animals. Without the Chaos Emeralds, an eruption begins to destroy the fortress. Sonic destroys Robotnik's escape ship. Tails rescues Sonic, while Robotnik falls into the volcano, which sinks into the ocean and explodes.

== Development ==
The marketing/research folks indicated that Sonic's casino levels were among the favorites, birthing the idea of the overall direction. I honestly don't know who came up with that, but it sounded fun and doable, so STI [Sega Technical Institute] jumped on it.

— Peter Morawiec in a retrospective interview with Retro Gamer.

Sonic the Hedgehog 2 boosted sales of the Sega Genesis in the 1992 holiday shopping season. When Sega of America's management realized that Sonic the Hedgehog 3 would not be ready until next year, they commissioned another game that could be completed in time for the 1993 holiday season. Sonic Spinball was developed by mostly American staff from Sega Technical Institute while the Japanese staff were producing Sonic 3.

Sega's research suggested that the Casino Night Zone was one of the most popular levels in Sonic the Hedgehog 2. This provided designer Peter Morawiec with a direction for the new game. Morawiec drew inspiration from the 1992 Amiga game Pinball Dreams to combine pinball mechanics with the gameplay of Sonic the Hedgehog. Morawiec and three colleagues designed basic animations depicting Sonic as a pinball. The animations were demonstrated to Sega's senior management, who approved the project.

The game would have to be completed in under a year to be ready in time for the 1993 holiday season. Morawiec considered this a "tight" schedule for a game that would capitalize on the series' popularity in North America. To speed up production, Sega sent veteran staff from Japan to assist, including regular Sonic the Hedgehog artist Katsuhiko Sato. Despite the transfer of these staff, the game was still not predicted to be complete in time. As a result, Sega Technical Institute staff changed the programming language from assembly to C, an unusual choice for Genesis games at the time. Morawiec said the choice caused frame rate and optimization problems, but greatly accelerated development. A large part of the game's development happened in June and August 1993, the project evolved from a roughly playable build to a completed game.

Immediately before the game was due to ship, the team was informed that Sega did not own the rights to the Sonic the Hedgehog title theme. Morawiec recalled uproar among the team after Hirokazu Yasuhara, the lead designer on Sonic Team, explained that the tune was owned by the Japanese band Dreams Come True, whose member Masato Nakamura composed the soundtrack for the first two Sonic games. Morawiec tasked lead composer Howard Drossin to write a new title theme within two hours.

=== Release ===
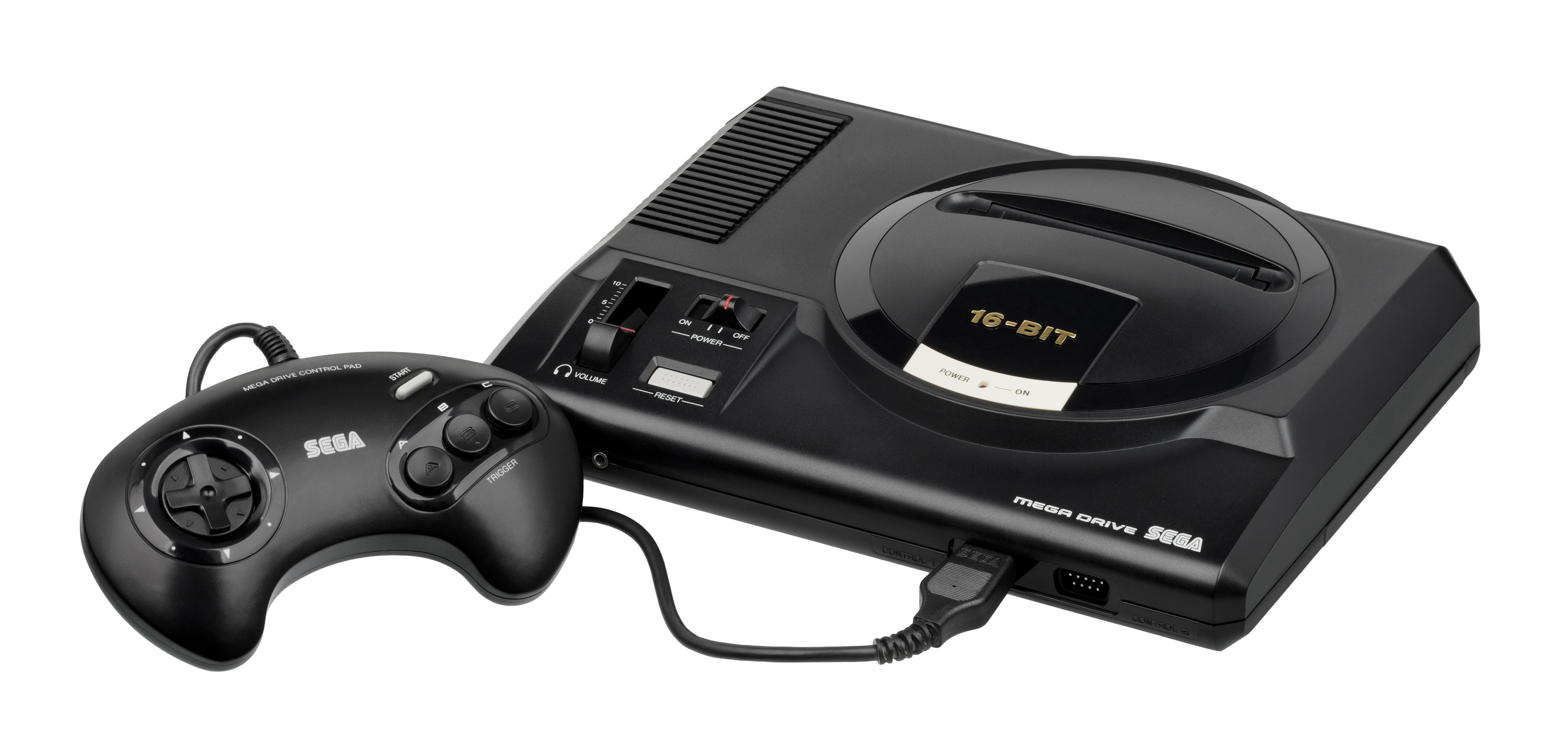
The game was originally released for the Sega Genesis/Mega Drive in 1993.

Morawiec believe the game would face "acceptance challenges" from both fans and the gaming media, as it strayed away from the traditional platforming genre. After returning to the United States from Europe, Morawiec was surprised to find that the game had sold well, and was pleased that it benefited from the franchise's popularity. Nonetheless, he regretted that the team had lacked time to "polish" the game.

After the Game Gear game Sonic Drift received poor reviews in Japan, Sega released an 8-bit port of Sonic Spinball for the Game Gear in its place worldwide in late 1994. It was also released for the Master System in Europe on January 27, 1995. It was also released in Brazil in 1995. The 8-bit version is mostly identical to the Genesis game, with downgraded visuals and different, more platforming-oriented bonus stages. The Master System version was released near the end of the console's lifetime and did not sell well, and became a valuable collector's item.

Sonic Spinball has been rereleased on 11 different platforms. The Genesis version of the game has been rereleased on the Sonic Mega Collection (2002) for the GameCube, Sonic Mega Collection Plus (2004) for the PlayStation 2 and Xbox, Sonic's Ultimate Genesis Collection (2009) for the Xbox 360 and PlayStation 3, Sega Genesis Classics (2018) for the Nintendo Switch, PlayStation 4, and Xbox One, and multiple iterations of the Sega Smash Pack series of compilations, including a port to Game Boy Advance. The Game Gear version appears as an unlockable game in Sonic Adventure DX: Director's Cut for the GameCube and Windows, as well as Sonic Gems Collection for the GameCube and PlayStation 2. It was also released along with the other 11 Game Gear Sonic games on Sonic Origins Plus in 2023. The Genesis version was released on the Wii's Virtual Console on March 12, 2007, in North America and April 6, 2007, in PAL regions. An emulated form of the game was also made available for iOS devices via Apple's App Store in 2010, but was later removed along with other Sega games in 2015. It was released on Steam in 2010 and on the Nintendo Classics service in 2022.

== Reception ==
Contemporary reception

Review scores
Publication	Score
Electronic Gaming Monthly	8/10, 7/10, 6/10, 7/10 (Genesis)
Famitsu	8/10, 7/10, 6/10, 7/10 (Genesis)
Mean Machines Sega	81% (Mega Drive)
Electronic Games	93% (Genesis)
Entertainment Weekly	C (Genesis)
MegaTech	86% (Mega Drive)

The Genesis version received generally positive reviews upon release. Laurie Yates of Electronic Games gave it a highly positive review, with scores of 90% for graphics and sound, and 95% for playability and replayability. Scary Larry of GamePro referred to it as a "fun, fast, and frenetic" pinball game, complimenting its graphics, music and controls while saying that pinball purists may not appreciate the games "cutesy additions to a pinball motif".

The visuals were generally well received. Ed Semrad of Electronic Gaming Monthly thought that the game being set inside a pinball machine was a novel idea, and also labelled the game's visuals, music, and sound effects as "top-notch". Al Manuel of the same publication opined that the graphics were not as "sharp" as other Sonic the Hedgehog titles, and also thought the sound was unimpressive.

Bob Strauss of Entertainment Weekly felt that the game initially boasted a terrific concept, but had an ultimately flawed execution, saying that Sonic, acting as a pinball, often moved like a "leaden marble". Rich Leadbetter from Mean Machines Sega also expressed concern over the game's lack of replay value, saying that despite its addictive gameplay, the four levels were not enough, especially given the price.

Andromeda of GamePro, in a mixed review of the Game Gear version, criticized the control configuration and felt that the game was a mediocre example of a pinball game, but admitted that it had a similar feel to previous Sonic the Hedgehog titles.

=== Retrospective ===
Retrospective reception

Aggregate scores
Aggregator	Score
GameRankings	61% (6 reviews)
Metacritic	68/100 iOS

Review scores
Publication	Score
Eurogamer	4/10 (Virtual Console)
IGN	7.5/10 (Virtual Console)
Jeuxvideo.com	15/20 (Mega Drive)
Nintendo Life	4/10 (Virtual Console)

Retrospectively, Sonic Spinball received mixed reviews, holding a score of 61% at the video game review aggregator platform GameRankings.

In a retrospective review, Lucas Thomas from IGN felt that the game's graphics matched those of later Sonic games on the Genesis, and considered Spinball's minigames to be "visually distinct and well-done." A reviewer from Jeuxvideo.com thought the graphics were "generally good", but indicated that there were other visually superior games for the Genesis. In similar vein, William Avery of GameSpot noticed that the game contained some slowdown. Eurogamer's Dan Whitehead criticized the game's sluggish frame rate and slowdown that occurred when "things threaten to get hectic" in-game, noting that it suffered from "the old Mega Drive problem".

Various aspects of the gameplay garnered a mixed reception from critics, though the game's control scheme received the most criticism. Jeuxvideo.com's reviewer enjoyed how Sonic himself acted as a pinball, but noticed that the controls were less precise and responsive when compared to other platformers. Dan Whitehead asserted that the game's controls were "muddled by the half-and-half approach", and criticized its "clunky" game engine, saying that the game's control scheme ruined the pinball environments. Thomas stated, "There are aspects of the control that could have been tighter, and its difficulty level may be a bit too extreme for new players." Damien McFarren from Nintendo Life said that the game comes across as both a poor platformer and a poor pinball game due to its unconvincing ball physics and frustrating platform elements.

== Legacy ==
A second pinball game in the series, Sonic Pinball Party, was released for the Game Boy Advance in 2003 to generally favorable reviews.

In 2010, a spinning rollercoaster, Sonic Spinball, opened in the Alton Towers theme park in Staffordshire. Although the rollercoaster was not originally designed with a Sonic the Hedgehog theme, the ride became part of a sponsorship deal between Sega and Alton Towers. A Sonic the Hedgehog-themed hotel room was later made available at Alton Towers Hotel, which featured various playable Sonic the Hedgehog games, as well as wallpaper based on Sonic the Hedgehog 4: Episode I.
