= Sonic Triple Trouble 16-Bit =

Fan-made video game

- Developer: Noah Copeland
- Publisher: Noah Copeland
- Designer: Noah Copeland
- Series: Sonic the Hedgehog (unofficial remake)
- Engine: GameMaker
- Platforms: Windows; macOS; Android
- Release: Windows; August 2, 2022; macOS, Android; May 26, 2023
- Genre: Platform
- Modes: Single-player, multiplayer

Sonic Triple Trouble 16-Bit is a 2022 platform game created by American indie developer and music composer Noah Copeland. It is an unofficial remake of the 1994 Game Gear game Sonic the Hedgehog: Triple Trouble (Note: Known in Japan as Sonic & Tails 2 (ソニック&(アンド)テイルス 2, Sonikku ando Teirusu 2).) in the style of the Sonic the Hedgehog games released for the Sega Genesis. The game retains the broad story of the original but is set after the events of Sonic 3 & Knuckles. The player controls Sonic and Tails simultaneously, unlike in the original game, and must guide them through a series of levels. Abilities and power-ups from both the original and other Sonic games are included.

Copeland conceived Triple Trouble 16-Bit in 2017. Having little prior game development experience, Copeland taught himself various skills to create the remake. He drew inspiration from entries across the entire Sonic series, as well as fan games and other Genesis titles. The presentation was designed to be faithful to the Genesis hardware and its limitations. Although a significant amount of the remake was done by Copeland, he received help from numerous collaborators with different aspects of the game. Triple Trouble 16-Bit was released for Windows in August 2022 and for macOS and Android in May 2023. Critics praised its presentation, level design, and sense of authenticity.

== Gameplay ==
Sonic Triple Trouble 16-Bit (right) lets the player swap between Sonic and Tails during gameplay, a feature not found in the original game (left).

Sonic Triple Trouble 16-Bit is a remake of the 1994 Game Gear game Sonic the Hedgehog: Triple Trouble in the style of the Sonic the Hedgehog games released for the Sega Genesis. Like the original, it is a platform game structured into a series of levels. It retains the broad story of the original game but set after the events of Sonic 3 & Knuckles. In the original, the player could only choose between Sonic and Tails and play as them individually. In Triple Trouble 16-Bit, however, the player can swap between them during gameplay. All of Sonic and Tails' abilities return from the original: both characters can perform a spin dash to accelerate forward and attack enemies; they can curl into a ball after launching off of a spring to protect themselves and attack enemies; Sonic can perform a strike dash, making him temporarily immune to enemy attacks; and Tails can fly. The spin dash and Tails' flight have been altered to function closer to their equivalents in the Genesis Sonic games. Sonic can also perform the drop dash from Sonic Mania, letting him transition from a jump into a spin dash, and Tails can swim like in Sonic 3 & Knuckles. The elemental shield power-ups from Sonic 3 & Knuckles are present, as is the gold shield from Sonic 3D Blast. The shields give various abilities to Sonic and defensive properties to both characters. The rocket shoes and sea fox, power-ups from the original, are designated to single levels. While all levels from the original return, they have new enemies, mechanics, and layouts, though elements of the original's level design are also reused. New mechanics have been added to the boss fights, and the lives system can be replaced with an alternate system based on Sonic Origins. The special stages are in a pseudo-3d style, similar to some in the original, but feature different gameplay. In them, the player must race against Fang the Sniper to obtain Chaos Emeralds.

Knuckles, Fang, and Metal Sonic are unlockable as player characters for use in free play mode, each having unique abilities. Amy Rose is also playable in free play mode. The player can choose between her movesets from Sonic Origins, Sonic Superstars, and Sonic 3 A.I.R., a fan-made remaster of Sonic 3 & Knuckles. The free play characters are present in competition mode, which features races, fights, and cutscenes. Competition mode can either be played in single-player or with one other player.

== Development and release ==
Sonic Triple Trouble 16-Bit was directed and designed by Noah Copeland, a film and video game composer from Texas. He conceived the idea while playing Sonic Chaos and Sonic Triple Trouble with a film crew in the summer of 2017. After having collaborated on three failed Sonic fan game projects as a music composer, Copeland wanted to lead his own Sonic fan game. He thought that remaking a preexisting Sonic game would be more practical than creating a new one. Copeland discovered 16-bit-style renditions of Triple Trouble level artwork on the internet, created by German artist Dee Liteyears, and reached out to collaborate with her. She had tried to kickstart a Triple Trouble remake herself, and was hoping that her art would inspire somebody to create one.

Triple Trouble 16-Bit took five years to create. At the beginning, Copeland only had game development experience with a handful of game jam projects and fan game prototypes. His past experiences collaborating on failed Sonic fan game projects motivated him to learn various skills, including programming, game design, and creating Genesis-style music. The remake was developed with the GameMaker engine using a fan-made framework based on the Sonic series. Created by Aleksander Norberg, the framework provided Sonic's basic physics and movement. Copeland originally intended to keep Triple Trouble's level design intact and focus on improving the artwork. However, the difference in physics between the Game Gear and Genesis Sonic games resulted in him redesigning the levels to be in the style of the latter. The aim of the project shifted from a straightforward remake to "spiritually recreating" the original. Copeland looked to both older and newer Sonic games for inspiration, including the 3D entries and other fan games, and took note of the spectacle and variety of level mechanics he identified in the series. The level design of the Genesis Sonic titles and Sonic Mania was studied by Copeland, with the balance of platforming gameplay and speed in Sonic 3 & Knuckles particularly influencing him. Copeland intended for the game to be easier than the Genesis Sonic titles, specifically concerning their late-game difficulty, bottomless pits, and game over conditions, and God of War (2018) inspired him to design the game without cuts or fades between levels. Copeland also studied Genesis games outside of the Sonic series to ensure that Triple Trouble 16-Bit look and felt accurate to the limitations of the Genesis hardware. To achieve this, limitations were self-imposed on the art, colors, and graphical effects. Originally, Copeland intended to remake the soundtrack in CD quality, with 16-bit-style renditions being considered as an optional feature. In the end, the music and sound effects were created using a tool named FMDrive, which replicates the sound of the Genesis. While a significant amount of the game was done by Copeland, numerous collaborators helped him, mainly with artwork, music composition, and translating the game into different languages.

Triple Trouble 16-Bit was released for Windows on August 2, 2022, and for macOS and Android on May 26, 2023, for free via Game Jolt. On August 31, 2023, an update was released adding Amy Rose and super forms for all characters to free play mode, an alternative to the game's lives system based on Sonic Origins, and more language options.

== Reception ==
Critics highlighted Sonic Triple Trouble 16-Bit's sense of authenticity. It surpassed TechRadar's expectations for a Sonic fan game, who described it as “almost unfailingly authentic”. They appreciated the game for remaining exciting while staying faithful to the limitations of the Genesis hardware. Time Extension considered Triple Trouble 16-Bit to be authentic not only to Genesis hardware limitations, but also in its mechanics, presentation, and inspiration from other Genesis titles. They said that its production value felt official, and remarked that the game “celebrates Sega history and retro gaming culture”. MeriStation determined that Triple Trouble 16-Bit expanded upon the original game while retaining its spirit, and considered it a “superb reinterpretation”. VG247, while noting that Triple Trouble 16-Bit wasn't as polished as an official Sonic game, felt it came close to the quality of one. They concluded that the game would be nearing a 5-star VG247 score if it were official. Hardcore Gaming 101 also concluded that Triple Trouble 16-Bit did not invalidate the original game, but rather that both were “equally valid works” modeled after the Genesis Sonic games.

The level design was positively received. Time Extension and Hardcore Gaming 101 felt that the game successfully balanced moments of platforming and spectacle. Time Extension was also impressed by the levels' size and interactivity, and VG247 wrote that old level design elements were reused inventively. TechRadar considered the expanded levels to be an improvement. They remarked that, despite the levels being expanded, Triple Trouble 16-Bit preserved the “pleasantly compact feel” of the original. The story's presentation was also praised. Hardcore Gaming 101 admired how the game transitioned between levels "seamlessly" to present the story without interruption. VG247 also appreciated the use of dialogue-free cutscenes for doing “more with less”. Time Extension believed that the level transitions completed the experience, and that the game had a “heightened sense of continuity and storytelling”. The soundtrack was received positively as well. Hardcore Gaming 101 and VG247 felt Triple Trouble 16-Bit successfully iterated on the original compositions, and TechRadar described the new compositions as “masterful”.
