= Sonic the Hedgehog: Triple Trouble =

1994 video game

- European box art
- Developer: Aspect
- Publisher: Sega
- Director: Katsuhiro Hasegawa
- Producer: Motoshige Hokoyama
- Composer: Yayoi Fujimori
- Series: Sonic the Hedgehog
- Platform: Game Gear
- Release: JP: November 11, 1994; WW: November 1994
- Genre: Platform
- Mode: Single-player

Sonic the Hedgehog: Triple Trouble (Note: Released in Japan as Sonic & Tails 2 (Japanese: ソニック&(アンド)テイルス 2, Hepburn: Sonikku ando Teirusu 2)) is a 1994 platform game developed by Aspect and published by Sega for the Game Gear. It is the sequel to Sonic Chaos (1993) and features classic side-scrolling Sonic gameplay. The player controls either Sonic the Hedgehog or Miles "Tails" Prower as they venture to protect the powerful Chaos Emeralds from Doctor Robotnik, Knuckles the Echidna, and series newcomer Fang the Sniper. Sonic and Tails' unique abilities, as well as various power-ups, can assist the player in gameplay.

Critics found the game to be enjoyable and praised its graphics, but thought that it lacked in challenge and originality to help it stand out from previous Sonic games. Reception was more positive in retrospect. Critics have considered it one of the best Sonic games on the 8-bit Game Gear, coming closer than the others to matching the quality of its 16-bit counterparts. Triple Trouble has been rereleased through various Sonic game compilations, the Coleco Sonic handheld system, and the Nintendo 3DS.

== Gameplay ==
Tails running through a loop

Triple Trouble is a side-scrolling platformer similar to that of previous Sonic games. The story follows Sonic the Hedgehog and Tails in their efforts to stop the powerful Chaos Emeralds from being acquired by Doctor Robotnik, who has tricked Knuckles the Echidna into aiding him. Treasure hunter Fang the Sniper (Nack the Weasel in international releases) is also in search of the Emeralds.

Players can choose to control either Sonic or Tails through six differently themed areas referred to as zones. Each zone consists of three levels, with the third containing a boss fight. Both characters play similarly and can execute a spin dash to accelerate forward in a rolling formation. Sonic can also perform a peel-out move, previously introduced in Sonic CD, whereas Tails can fly for a short amount of time. Various power-ups can be obtained throughout the game. However, many are exclusive to one character, such as Sonic's jet board and Tails' sea fox items. The differences between Sonic and Tails' power-ups may result in the player's traversal of levels to slightly diverge between the two.

The player can collect rings as they explore the levels. 30 rings are lost when hit by an enemy and 50 when colliding with a spike obstacle. Collecting 100 rings will reward the player with an extra life. If the player destroys a box with a Chaos Emerald icon and has at least 50 rings, Sonic will be transported to a special bonus stage for an opportunity to obtain one of five collectable Emeralds. Some of these stages are labyrinth-like platforming levels while others have the player piloting a plane to collect rings.

== Development and release ==
Triple Trouble was developed by Aspect and is the sequel to Sonic Chaos (1993). The game introduced a new character in the Sonic series, Fang the Sniper, who was originally called Jet during development; he was renamed Nack the Weasel in international releases. Fang was shown with a gun in early promotional screenshots, but this was removed in the final game. The game was originally titled Sonic Chaos 2 in the West, with releases planned on both of Sega's 8-bit systems, the Game Gear handheld console and Master System home console. The game was ultimately only released for the Game Gear, making it the first Sonic platformer released exclusively for the system. It was released in Western territories in November 1994 and in Japan on November 11 specifically, in which it was titled Sonic & Tails 2.

Since its initial release the game has been rereleased multiple times. It was included with other Sonic Game Gear games in Sonic Adventure DX: Director's Cut (2003), Sonic Gems Collection (2005), and Sonic Origins Plus (2023). The game was also included in the Coleco Sonic handheld console released in 2006. Triple Trouble was later released on the Nintendo 3DS's Virtual Console in March 2012, alongside other Game Gear titles.

== Reception ==
Contemporary reception

Review scores
Publication	Score
Computer and Video Games	68%
Electronic Gaming Monthly	7/10, 7/10, 6/10, 7/10
Famitsu	6/10, 5/10, 6/10, 4/10
Mean Machines Sega	85%
Sega Magazine	71%
Sega Pro	71%

Award
Publication	Award
VideoGames (1994)	Best Game Gear Game (runner-up)

Critics felt Triple Trouble was fun but too similar to previous Sonic games, and thought the series was beginning to stagnate. Other than the addition of vehicles, many criticized the game for lacking in originality. Steve Merrett of Mean Machines Sega wrote that it lacked "surprises and gameplay innovation," and remarked that the Game Gear Sonic titles were "going through the same mid-life crisis here that Sonic and Knuckles represents on the Mega Drive". However, he found the game to be a good 8-bit counterpart to Sonic 3, as did Richard Leadbetter of Sega Magazine, who noted similar level themes shared between the games. Leadbetter and Sushi-X of Electronic Gaming Monthly appreciated the levels for their large size and found that they invited exploration.

The graphics received universal praise. Paul Bufton of Mean Machines Sega wrote that the backgrounds and character sprites were "the best to grace the Game Gear" and believed them to be superior to those in previous Game Gear Sonic games. Additionally, Sega Magazine and Sega Pro thought the visuals approached the 16-bit quality seen on the Mega Drive Sonic games. Sega Magazine also noted that other Game Gear Sonic games were cropped versions of the Master System versions and thus suffered gameplay-wise, and felt this was not a problem with Triple Trouble.

One of the most common complaints was a lack of challenge. Many critics felt the game's levels were sparsely populated with enemies, making it too short and easy to complete. Computer and Video Games and Mean Machines Sega believed this lack of challenge harmed its long term value to players. Sega Magazine suspected that the lack of enemies was to maintain the game's performance. Consequently, GamePro noticed frame rate dips when the screen was busy.

In retrospective reviews, Triple Trouble is considered one of the better Sonic games on the Game Gear. NGC of GamesRadar+ thought it was "reasonably competent" but no less tedious than other Sonic Game Gear games. Ryan Davis of GameSpot believed it did a better job capturing classic Sonic gameplay than other games on the system, due to it being a later release and thus more technically competent. Corbie Dillard of Nintendo Life agreed, writing that Sega had made a strong attempt to capture classic Mega Drive Sonic gameplay on the Game Gear, and believed Triple Trouble was "probably the closest thing gamers could get to the overall style of play of the 16-bit titles on a handheld". Sean Madson of Diehard GameFan appreciated the 3DS release for adding different resolutions, button configurations, and save state support.

== Legacy ==
In August 2022, an unofficial fan remake titled Sonic Triple Trouble 16-Bit, by indie developer Noah Copeland, was released for Windows via Game Jolt, with Android and macOS ports later following. It is built on the GameMaker Studio engine with a style reminiscent of the 16-bit Sonic games. Copeland was inspired to remake Triple Trouble after playing it and thinking it was a "good classic Sonic game buried under 8-bit limitations". The remake received overwhelmingly positive reception from critics - Stuart Gipp of TechRadar called it a "world-class fangame" that vastly improved on the original, praising its "joyous set pieces" and "masterful compositions". Alex Donaldson of VG247 described it as one of his favorite Sonic fangames, saying that it constantly added new mechanics and had an excellent soundtrack, and summing it up as a "worthy successor to Sonic Mania that would have been "dangerously close to a 5-star [...] review", were it official.

Fang was later included in some Sonic comics series and the games Sonic Drift 2 (1995), Sonic the Fighters (1996), Sonic Mania (2017), and Sonic Superstars (2023).
