= Tee Lopes =

Portuguese American composer

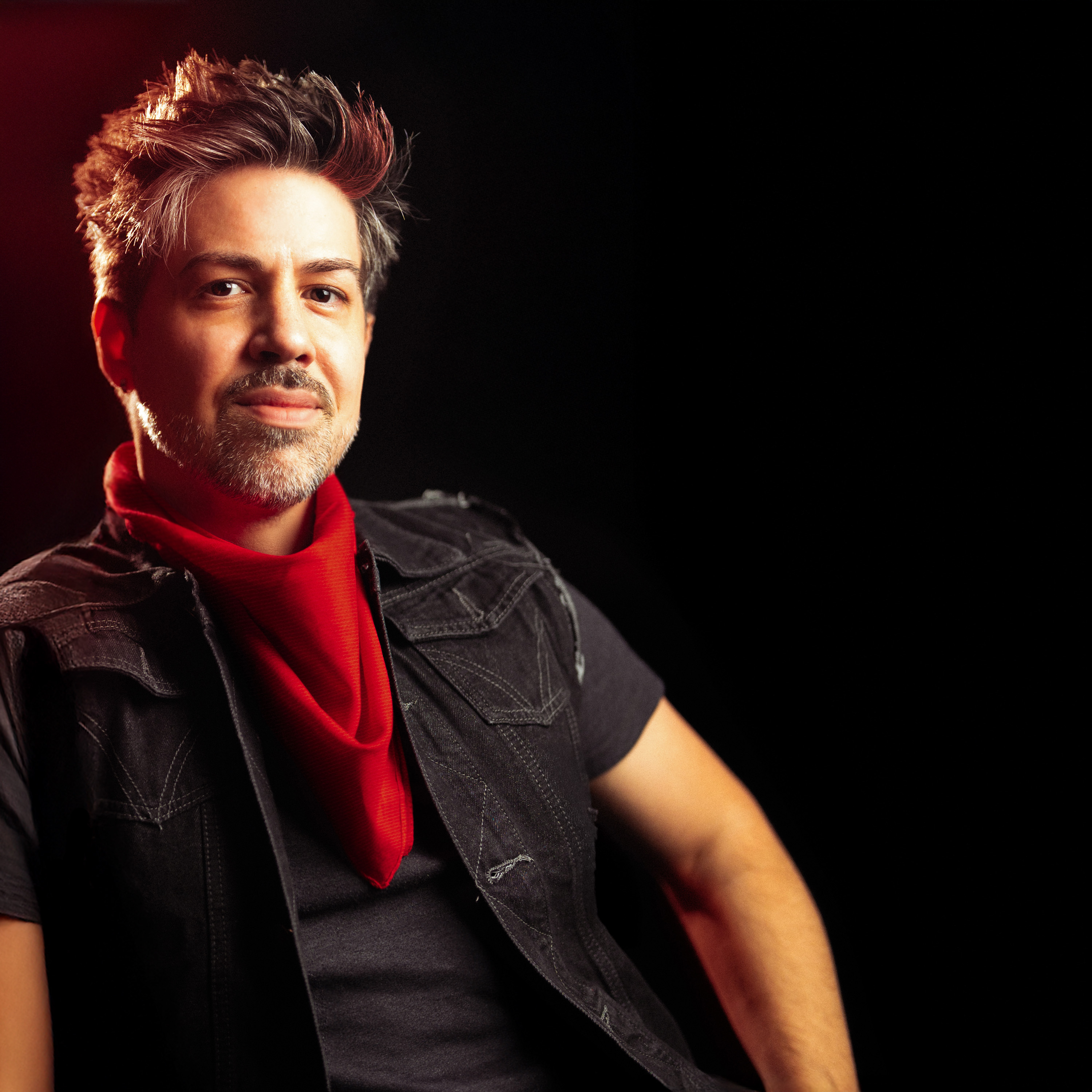
- Lopes in 2024

Background information
- Born: Tiago Lopes; Coimbra, Portugal
- Occupation: Composer
- Website: teelopesmusic.com

Tiago Lopes (/loʊps/ LOHPS), known professionally as Tee Lopes, is a Portuguese American video game composer. He is best known for his contributions to the Sonic the Hedgehog series, starting with Sonic Mania (2017).

== Early life ==
Lopes was born in Coimbra, Portugal. In 2009, he uploaded his first Sonic the Hedgehog remix to YouTube, which led to his career as a video game composer. He has continued to upload remixes, original tracks, and other personal works.

== Career ==
Lopes began as a hobbyist musician working on indie games and fan games. After becoming known for his Sonic the Hedgehog remixes on YouTube, he went on to compose an HD fan port of Sonic the Hedgehog 2. After its completion, several of its developers, including Lopes, created PagodaWest Games, an indie game developer.

In 2017, Lopes and the developers of PagodaWest Games partnered with Sega to develop Sonic Mania, a game that notably featured other well-known Sonic fan creators such as Christian Whitehead and Headcannon. He was awarded IGN's People's Choice Vote for Best Original Music for Sonic Mania.

After Mania, Lopes became a freelance composer and continued to compose for video games such as Sonic Superstars, Streets of Rage 4, and Teenage Mutant Ninja Turtles: Shredder's Revenge. On the Twitch charity fundraiser Indieland 2023, it was confirmed that Lopes was composing the soundtrack to the game Penny's Big Breakaway. Additionally, he has composed for several web series, such as Sonic Mania Adventures, SomecallmeJohnny, and Scott the Woz.

In 2026, Lopes served as lead composer for Denshattack!, working with additional core and guest composers and performers.

== Works ==
=== Video games ===
Year	Title	Notes
2013	Major Magnet	Music
2017	Sonic Mania	Music
2018	Monster Boy and the Cursed Kingdom	Opening theme
2019	Team Sonic Racing	Music with several others
2019	League of Legends	"Arcade 2019: Ultracombo"
2019	Banana Kong Blast	Music and visual effects
2021	Mighty Fight Federation	Music with several others
2021	Streets of Rage 4	Mr. X Nightmare downloadable content
2022	Sonic Origins	Animated cutscenes
2022	Teenage Mutant Ninja Turtles: Shredder's Revenge	Music
2022	Banana Kong 2	Music
2022	Sonic Frontiers	Divergence prologue animation score
2023	Sonic Superstars	Music with several others
2023	Sonic Dream Team	Animated intro music
2024	Penny's Big Breakaway	Music
2024	Berserk Boy	Music
2024	Contra: Operation Galuga	"Snow & Mechanica"
2024	Tomba! Special Edition	Credits theme arrangement
2024	G.I. Joe: Wrath of Cobra	Music with several others
2024	Metal Slug Tactics	Music
2025	Friday Night Funkin'	"Senpai (Pico Mix)"
2025	Shinobi: Art of Vengeance	Music with Yuzo Koshiro
2025	Sonic Racing: CrossWorlds	"Market Street"
2025	Marvel Cosmic Invasion	Music
2026	Denshattack!	Lead composer; music with several others

=== Web series ===
Year	Title	Notes
2017	Sonic Mania Adventures	Lead composer
2018	SomecallmeJohnny	Guest composer
2020	Scott the Woz (season 4)	"Credits Theme"
2022	Caddicarus	Guest composer
2023	Scott the Woz (season 6)	"Staff Roll"
