= Sonic Origins =

2022 video game compilation

- Developer: Sonic Team (Note: The original games were developed by Sonic Team (Sonic the Hedgehog), Sega Technical Institute (Sonic the Hedgehog 2 and Sonic the Hedgehog 3 & Knuckles), and Sega (Sonic CD). The included remastered versions were developed by Christian Whitehead and Headcannon.)
- Publisher: Sega
- Director: Katsuyuki Shigihara
- Producers: Takashi Iizuka; Nobuya Ohashi
- Artist: Tyson Hesse
- Writer: Ian Flynn
- Composers: Jun Senoue; Tee Lopes
- Series: Sonic the Hedgehog
- Engine: Retro Engine
- Platforms: Nintendo Switch; PlayStation 4; PlayStation 5; Windows; Xbox One; Xbox Series X/S
- Release: June 23, 2022; Sonic Origins Plus; June 23, 2023
- Genre: Platform
- Modes: Single-player, multiplayer

Sonic Origins (Note: Japanese: ソニックオリジンズ, Hepburn: Sonikku Orijinzu) is a 2022 video game compilation developed by Sonic Team and published by Sega. It features remasters of the first four platform games in the Sonic the Hedgehog series—Sonic the Hedgehog (1991), Sonic the Hedgehog 2 (1992), Sonic CD (1993), and Sonic 3 & Knuckles (1994)—originally released for the Sega Genesis and the Sega CD. The games are playable in their original format and a new widescreen "anniversary mode". Origins adds additional game modes and missions, which allow players to unlock content in a museum.

Origins was conceived following the release of the 2020 Sonic film. Due to the influx of new fans, Sonic Team head Takashi Iizuka wanted to make the older Sonic games available on modern hardware. The remasters of Sonic the Hedgehog, Sonic 2, and Sonic CD are based on the Retro Engine-developed remakes released between 2011 and 2013, while Simon Thomley and his studio Headcannon, who worked on Sonic Mania (2017), developed the remaster of Sonic 3 & Knuckles. Jun Senoue replaced a portion of the Sonic 3 soundtrack, following speculation of licensing problems arising from Michael Jackson’s involvement with Sonic 3.

Origins was released digitally for the Nintendo Switch, PlayStation 4, PlayStation 5, Windows, Xbox One, and Xbox Series X/S on June 23, 2022, the series' 31st anniversary. It received favorable reviews; critics praised the enhancements and presentation, but criticized the downloadable content (DLC), replaced music in Sonic 3, lack of features, and bugs not present in the original games. An expanded version adding playable characters and the 12 Game Gear Sonic games, Sonic Origins Plus, was released physically and as DLC for the original on June 23, 2023.

== Content ==
Sonic Origins compiles and remasters the first four platform games in Sega's Sonic the Hedgehog series—Sonic the Hedgehog (1991), Sonic the Hedgehog 2 (1992), Sonic CD (1993), and Sonic the Hedgehog 3 & Knuckles (1994)—originally released for the Sega Genesis and the Sega CD. The player controls Sonic the Hedgehog, Miles "Tails" Prower, and Knuckles the Echidna as they attempt to stop Doctor Eggman from stealing the Chaos Emeralds. They traverse side-scrolling levels at high speeds while collecting rings, defeating enemies and bosses, and finding secrets. Unlike the originals, the player can control Tails and Knuckles in most games.

Origins features two gameplay styles for each game, both using the Retro Engine version: "classic mode" presents the games in their original 4:3 aspect ratio with no gameplay changes, while "anniversary mode" features support for widescreen displays, replaces lives with coins, and allows Sonic to use the "drop dash" from Sonic Mania. A "story mode" allows players to play through the four games sequentially as Sonic, with Tails joining him in Sonic 2 and Sonic 3 & Knuckles, in anniversary mode, with new animated cutscenes that bridge their stories, which are also seen when launching for the first time or clearing each game in either mode, respectively. When played through this mode, the games are in chronological story order, meaning that CD is played in between 1 and 2, rather than after. New modes include a boss rush mode; a mirror mode that reverses the level layouts; and a mission mode featuring 60 additional standalone challenges, such as collecting a target number of rings within a time limit or reaching the goal without destroying any enemies. The "Blue Spheres" minigame from Sonic 3 & Knuckles is also included, along with an all-new version called New Blue Spheres, which adds additional sphere types from Sonic Mania (2017).

An in-game museum allows players to view a collection of music, artwork, and videos, including the Sonic Mania Adventures animated shorts originally released in 2018. Players can unlock additional museum content, such as music arrangements from later games, concept art, and cutscene animatics, by completing in-game achievements or spending coins earned through gameplay. Coins can also be spent on additional attempts in Special Stages while in anniversary mode. Players who pre-ordered the game started with 100 Coins and mirror mode unlocked, which is available after clearing each game for the first time. Menu aesthetics, a set of 11 harder missions, and tracks from Sonic Spinball (1993), Knuckles' Chaotix (1995) and Sonic 3D Blast (1996) for the museum music player were released as downloadable content (DLC), later being incorporated into Sonic Origins Plus.

== Development ==
Sonic Origins was conceived alongside Sonic Colors: Ultimate (2021) following the release of the 2020 Sonic film. Because the film brought many new fans, Sonic Team head Takashi Iizuka wanted to make older Sonic games available on modern formats. Iizuka noted that though they are frequently rereleased via emulation, they felt "retro" on modern displays due to their 4:3 aspect ratios; he wanted Origins to modernize them with widescreen support and new features to appeal to both new and longtime fans. Sonic Mania encouraged Sonic Team that there was still an audience for 2D Sonic games and the series' 30th anniversary provided the "perfect" opportunity to develop a compilation.

The compilation was developed internally at Sega, which handled the presentation and consolidation of the included games. The remasters of Sonic the Hedgehog, Sonic 2, and Sonic CD are based on the remakes made in the Retro Engine released between 2011 and 2013; Evening Star's Christian Whitehead, creator of the Retro Engine, updated it to allow the remakes to run in a compilation. The Origins team prioritized the main Sonic series, so they did not consider including other 2D Sonic games, such as those released for the Game Gear, Knuckles' Chaotix, and the Sonic Advance series. Powerhouse Animation Studios produced the new cutscenes with longtime Sonic artist Tyson Hesse, with a script written by Sonic comic book writer Ian Flynn and featuring arranged music by Sonic Mania composer Tee Lopes.

Simon Thomley and his studio, Headcannon, who worked on the Retro Engine remakes and Sonic Mania, developed the Origins remaster of Sonic 3 & Knuckles. Thomley said he was contracted to develop the remaster separately from Origins. The compilation marks Sonic 3 & Knuckles' first rerelease since 2011, following speculation that soundtrack licensing problems arising from Michael Jackson’s involvement with Sonic 3 were preventing new releases. As Sega was unable to use the soundtrack for Origins, the Sonic Team composer Jun Senoue rearranged several tracks originally written for Sonic 3 prior to Jackson's involvement. They were previously featured in the 1997 Sonic & Knuckles Collection for Windows.

Thomley said he and the Headcannon team were unhappy with the version of Origins that Sega released, and that it did not represent Headcannon's work. He said they developed the Sonic 3 & Knuckles remaster under crunch conditions for a strict deadline, that Sega would not delay it, and that Sega had introduced bugs when integrating it into Origins. According to Thomley, the Headcannon team "were outsiders creating a separate project that was then wrangled into something entirely different".

== Release ==
Sonic Origins was announced during a livestream commemorating the Sonic franchise's 30th anniversary on May 27, 2021, and was released on June 23, 2022—the series' 31st anniversary—for the Nintendo Switch, PlayStation 4, PlayStation 5, Windows, Xbox One, and Xbox Series X/S. Prior to release, Sega delisted the existing versions of the games from most digital stores. The move received criticism on video game preservation grounds and for preventing consumers from choosing their preferred versions. It was compared to Rockstar Games delisting Grand Theft Auto games before the release of the compilation Grand Theft Auto: The Trilogy – The Definitive Edition (2021), a decision that was reversed following backlash.

On March 23, 2023, Sega announced an expanded version, Sonic Origins Plus, released on June 23, 2023, the game's first anniversary. The new content, which was released as both a physical edition and as DLC for the digital version, adds Amy Rose as a playable character, along with emulations of all 12 Sonic games for the Game Gear: Sonic the Hedgehog, Sonic the Hedgehog 2, Sonic Chaos, Sonic the Hedgehog: Triple Trouble, Sonic Spinball, Sonic Blast, Sonic Labyrinth, Dr. Robotnik's Mean Bean Machine, Sonic Drift, Sonic Drift 2, Tails' Skypatrol, and Tails Adventure. The expansion also makes Knuckles playable in Sonic CD. Plus includes all of the previously released DLC, which was delisted from individual sale following Plus's release. The physical release includes a reversible cover and 20-page art book, as well as a downloadable code of the Plus upgrade pack.

In October 2026 the game was re-released in the 35th anniversary Classic Sonic Collection for Nintendo Switch, which also included Sonic Mania and Sonic Superstars, reversible cover art and a collectible patch.

== Reception ==
Reception

Aggregate score
Aggregator	Score
Metacritic	(NS) 74/100 (PC) 72/100 (PS4) 72/100 (PS5) 78/100 (XSXS) 75/100

Review scores
Publication	Score
Destructoid	6.5/10
Game Informer	8.5/10
GameSpot	7/10
Hardcore Gamer	3.5/5
Nintendo Life	8/10
Nintendo World Report	6/10
Push Square	7/10
Shacknews	8/10
VentureBeat	4.5/5

According to review aggregator website Metacritic, Sonic Origins received "mixed or average" reviews for Nintendo Switch, PlayStation 4 and Windows, it received "generally favorable reviews" for the PlayStation 5 and Xbox Series X/S.

Zoey Handley of Destructoid felt that the compilation was lacking and lamented the lack of more substantial additions, writing: "The whole idea behind the new collection was apparently to 'modernize' the games; moving them into a new engine rather than simply emulating them. If that's the case, why stop with widescreen?" Brian Shea of Game Informer, by contrast, praised the enhancements made to the Anniversary mode, writing, "The Sonic Origins package is terrific overall... Having the best versions of the classic Sonic saga in one bundle is supremely satisfying." Heidi Kemps (GameSpot) and Stephen Tailby (Push Square) felt that while the additions made to the compilation justified the purchase for fans, its lackluster presentation and unnecessary DLC hindered Origins' overall quality.

Kemps noted that "even the recreations of the games themselves have some issues, with strange bugs that weren't present in the originals". John Linneman of Eurogamer also criticized the bugs, stating "most aren't game breaking, but the sheer number of them impact the overall experience", specifically mentioning a recurring bug in Sonic 2 that made Tails get stuck as the player progresses through the level. Jacob Bukacek of Hardcore Gamer felt that the new versions "aren't all that much better than the originals" and that the compilation "doesn't manage to justify the price tag". TJ Denzer of Shacknews was more forgiving, praising the added museum, Boss Rush mode, tight controls, and remaster quality, but disliked the lack of multiple saves and console commands.

Sam Machkovech of Ars Technica criticized the DLC, lack of a rewind or save state option, and the delisting of the existing versions from most digital stores, calling it "a tragic example of good classics ruined by greed". Regarding the game's lack of bonus content, VentureBeat's Mike Minotti wrote that "compared to, say, the 3D explorable world with its multiple media museums from Sonic Jam, it's a bit bare", but concluded that "a few oddities aside, these are fantastic remasters. Even if you're a Sonic fan who already owns these games in other compilations, Origins is worth it."

Sonic 3's replaced music received criticism. Destructoid said the replacement tracks "just feel wrong" and were inconsistent with the rest of the soundtrack, and Ars Technica said they did not compare well to the original tracks. Game Informer felt they stripped the levels of their nostalgic feel, but that replacing the music was better than omitting Sonic 3 entirely.
