= Sonic Chaos =

1993 video game

Sonic the Hedgehog Chaos
- Master System cover art
- Developer: Aspect
- Publisher: Sega
- Series: Sonic the Hedgehog
- Platforms: Game Gear, Master System
- Release: Game Gear: JP: November 19, 1993; WW: November 23, 1993; Master System: PAL: November 23, 1993
- Genre: Platform
- Mode: Single-player

Sonic the Hedgehog Chaos (Note: Released in Japan as Sonic & Tails (Japanese: ソニック&(アンド)テイルス, Hepburn: Sonikku ando Teirusu)) is a 1993 platform game developed by Aspect and published by Sega for the Master System and Game Gear. Players control Sonic the Hedgehog and his sidekick Miles "Tails" Prower in their quest to retrieve the Chaos Emeralds from Doctor Robotnik, who has stolen them to construct nuclear weapons. Gameplay involves running through stages, collecting rings, and defeating enemies. It is largely based on the Master System version of Sonic the Hedgehog 2, and is thus considered a follow-up to that game. Chaos is the first Sonic game for the Master System and Game Gear to feature Tails as a separate playable character with his own unique abilities.

Japanese studio Aspect, used the knowledge gained from its work on the previous Sonic game while designing Chaos to make it more expansive and faster than its predecessors. Chaos received a generally positive reception initially, with its levels and gameplay being praised; however, in retrospect it has gained a more average response for its unimpressive presentation and lackluster level design, alongside its slow framerate. A direct sequel, Sonic the Hedgehog: Triple Trouble, was released in 1994.

== Gameplay ==
Sonic in the game's final level, Electric Egg Zone

In Sonic Chaos, players control one of two characters—Sonic the Hedgehog or his sidekick Miles "Tails" Prower—and must complete each of the game's six worlds in a quest to retrieve the Chaos Emeralds from the evil scientist Dr. Robotnik, who plots to use them to rule the world. Each world, referred to as "zones" in-game, is made up of three levels, called "acts", the third one consisting of a boss fight against one of Robotnik's henchbots, or Robotnik himself in the final zone. Levels are designed to allow the player to move as quickly as possible, and are largely based on those in its predecessor Sonic the Hedgehog 2. The gameplay itself involves running through each level while collecting rings and defeating Robotnik's robotic minions; rings protect Sonic and Tails from being hit by an enemy or obstacle. Levels also contain small television monitors that can be smashed to reveal a power-up icon, which grant Sonic and Tails with unique abilities, such as speed shoes, a one-hit shield, and extra lives.

Chaos adds several new additions to the core Sonic gameplay. Both characters have their own unique characteristics; Sonic can perform a move called the "Super Peel-Out", originally in Sonic CD, that makes him move extra fast, while Tails is able to fly and can hover over traps and other obstacles. Sonic can collect a new power-up called the "Rocket Shoes", which grant him the ability to fly for a short period of time; Tails is unable to use this, and will simply be granted extra rings if he were to smash a monitor containing Rocket Shoes. If Sonic collects 100 rings in a level, he will be teleported to a special stage, which, if completed, will award him with a Chaos Emerald. There are multiple endings that are based on the number of Chaos Emeralds collected.

== Development and release ==
Sonic Chaos was developed by Japanese studio Aspect, being the second Sonic the Hedgehog game they produced, and published by Sega for the Master System and Game Gear. Chaos is largely based on the Master System version of Sonic the Hedgehog 2, and is thus considered a follow-up or successor to that game. Aspect used the experience it received for its work on the previous Sonic game while designing Chaos to make it more expansive and faster than its predecessors, in addition to improving the quality of the visuals. For the same reason, they were also able to make the game run faster. Chaos is both the first portable Sonic game and the first to feature Tails as a separate playable character with his own unique abilities.

Sonic Chaos was released for the Master System on November 23, 1993 exclusively to PAL regions, and for the Game Gear worldwide on the same day to coincide with the release of Sonic CD and Sonic Spinball as part of Sega of America's "Sonic Three on One Day" release strategy. In Japan, it was titled Sonic & Tails and was released four days earlier. The Game Gear version was included as an unlockable bonus in Sonic Adventure DX: Director's Cut (2003) as one of the eleven unlockable Sonic Game Gear games, and in Sonic Mega Collection Plus (2004) for the PlayStation 2, Xbox, and Windows. In 2009 the Master System version was digitally released for the Wii's Virtual Console worldwide. Sonic Chaos is also included in the blue-colored model of the Game Gear Micro in 2020, alongside Gunstar Heroes, Sylvan Tale, and Baku Baku Animal. It was also released along with the other 11 Game Gear Sonic games on Sonic Origins Plus in 2023, and is included as a playable minigame in the 2026 Sega title Yakuza Kiwami 3 & Dark Ties.

== Reception and legacy ==
Reception

Review scores
Publication	Score	
Publication	Game Gear	Master System
Electronic Gaming Monthly	9/10, 8/10, 8/10, 8/10	N/A
Eurogamer	N/A	7/10
Famitsu	8/10, 8/10, 7/10, 5/10	N/A
Nintendo Life	N/A	4/10
Electronic Games	89%	N/A
Entertainment Weekly	A−	N/A

In the United States, it was the top-selling Game Gear game in January 1994.

Sonic Chaos initially received a positive response from publications. The four reviewers of Electronic Gaming Monthly commented that the Game Gear version retains all the elements that made the 16-bit Sonic games fun to play. They also praised the graphics and the ability to play as Tails. Sonic Chaos was awarded Best Game Gear Game of 1993 by Electronic Gaming Monthly. Entertainment Weekly gave the game an A− and wrote that the game may be enjoyable for younger children. In their review for Sonic Mega Collection Plus, GameSpy felt that both it and the 8-bit Sonic the Hedgehog were the only Game Gear games in the series that are worth playing.

In later years, Chaos was met with a more average reception. Nintendo Life criticized the Master System version for being a generally uninspired game, criticizing its difficulty for being too easy and its level designs for being bland and mediocre. Retrospectively in 2019, Hardcore Gaming 101 gave a rather mixed response to the game; they felt disappointed with the gameplay and stage designs for lacking the uniqueness and puzzle-solving in Sonic the Hedgehog 2, and disliked its slow framerate. They were also critical of the soundtrack for being generally lacking in quality and for the overall presentation being unimpressive. Hardcore Gaming 101 said that Chaos was only worth checking out for dedicated Sonic fans writing: "Sonic Chaos is by no means a bad game, but it's not a particularly great game either. It's a functional platformer that's only worth checking out if you're really into 8-bit Sonic games, or have an interest in a traditional Sonic platformer with a bigger focus on exploration."

A fan-made remake of Sonic Chaos was announced in 2018, and a demo was released in August 2018. It features 16-bit era-styled graphics, as well as new game mechanics and boss fights. VG247 described the project as "incredibly well produced" and wrote it could "pass for the next project from Sega after Sonic Mania."
