= Sonic Drift 2 =

1995 video game

- Developer: Sega
- Publisher: Sega
- Director: Katsuhiro Hasegawa
- Composers: Masayuki Nagao; Saori Kobayashi
- Series: Sonic the Hedgehog
- Platform: Game Gear
- Release: JP: March 17, 1995; EU: April 28, 1995; NA: 1995
- Genre: Kart racing
- Modes: Single-player, multiplayer

Sonic Drift 2, (Note: Japanese: ソニックドリフト２, Hepburn: Sonikku Dorifuto Tsū) released in Europe as Sonic Drift Racing, is a 1995 kart racing video game developed and published by Sega for the Game Gear. It is the sequel to Sonic Drift (1994), unlike its predecessor, the game was released internationally. It added three characters: Knuckles, Fang the Sniper, and Metal Sonic, marking the first playable appearance for the latter two characters. Sonic Drift 2 has been rereleased through various Sonic game compilations and the Nintendo 3DS.

== Gameplay ==
The player as Metal Sonic in a race with Knuckles the Echidna, Fang the Sniper, and Dr. Eggman.

Similar to Sonic Drift, Sonic Drift 2 is a kart racing game. Players drive into the direction of the screen and around corners, including by drifting. They can also drive into video monitors on the track to pick up various power-ups, such as mines that can be used as a weapon, and a star that freezes all opponents. Rings on the track can be collected to use special abilities unique to each character. Alongside Sonic, Tails, Amy, and Dr. Eggman returning from the first game, there are three additional playable characters: Metal Sonic, Fang, and Knuckles.

Tracks in the game are based on locations from Sonic the Hedgehog 2 and Sonic 3, as well as original to the game. Some tracks are circuits, while others are linear point-to-point courses. Various road hazards are present and create further obstacles for players to avoid.

There are three gameplay modes. In the Chaos GP mode, players are awarded with Chaos Emeralds should they come in first place in a race. Free Run mode allows for players to test drive on the game's tracks alone, and Versus mode allows for competitive multiplayer, which requires two consoles and a link cable.

== Release ==
Sonic Drift 2 was released in Japan for the Game Gear on March 17, 1995. The game was later released in Europe as Sonic Drift Racing on April 28, 1995, and in North America the same year. In 2003, Sonic Drift 2 was released as an unlockable extra in Sonic Adventure DX: Director's Cut, and as one of the games featured in the Sonic compilation Sonic Gems Collection in 2005. It was released for the Nintendo 3DS's Virtual Console in Japan on November 14, 2012, followed by an international release on July 4, 2013. It was also released along with the other 11 Game Gear Sonic games on Sonic Origins Plus on June 23, 2023.

== Reception ==
Reception

Review scores
Publication	Score
Computer and Video Games	91%
Electronic Gaming Monthly	7/10, 6.5/10, 7/10, 7.5/10
Famitsu	5/10, 5/10, 5/10, 4/10
Game Informer	5.5/10
Mean Machines Sega	92%
Mega Fun	67%
Sega Magazine	77%
Sega Power	81%

Sonic Drift 2 received middling reviews in Famicom Tsūshin. GamePro's Sir Garnabus commented that, "Hairpin turns, bombs in the road, and competitors who never give up make Sonic Drift 2 Game Gear racing at its best." He also praised the detailed graphics, controls, and the use of a different musical piece for each track. Gus Swan and Steve Merrett of Mean Machines Sega praised the game for its good value for money and said it was a good reason to buy a link cable for two players. Computer and Video Games called the game a big improvement over the previous game and was overall a great racing game for the handheld, while German magazine Mega Fun thought the changes were mainly quantitative, with more characters and more complex tracks.
