= Tyson Hesse =

American artist (born 1984)

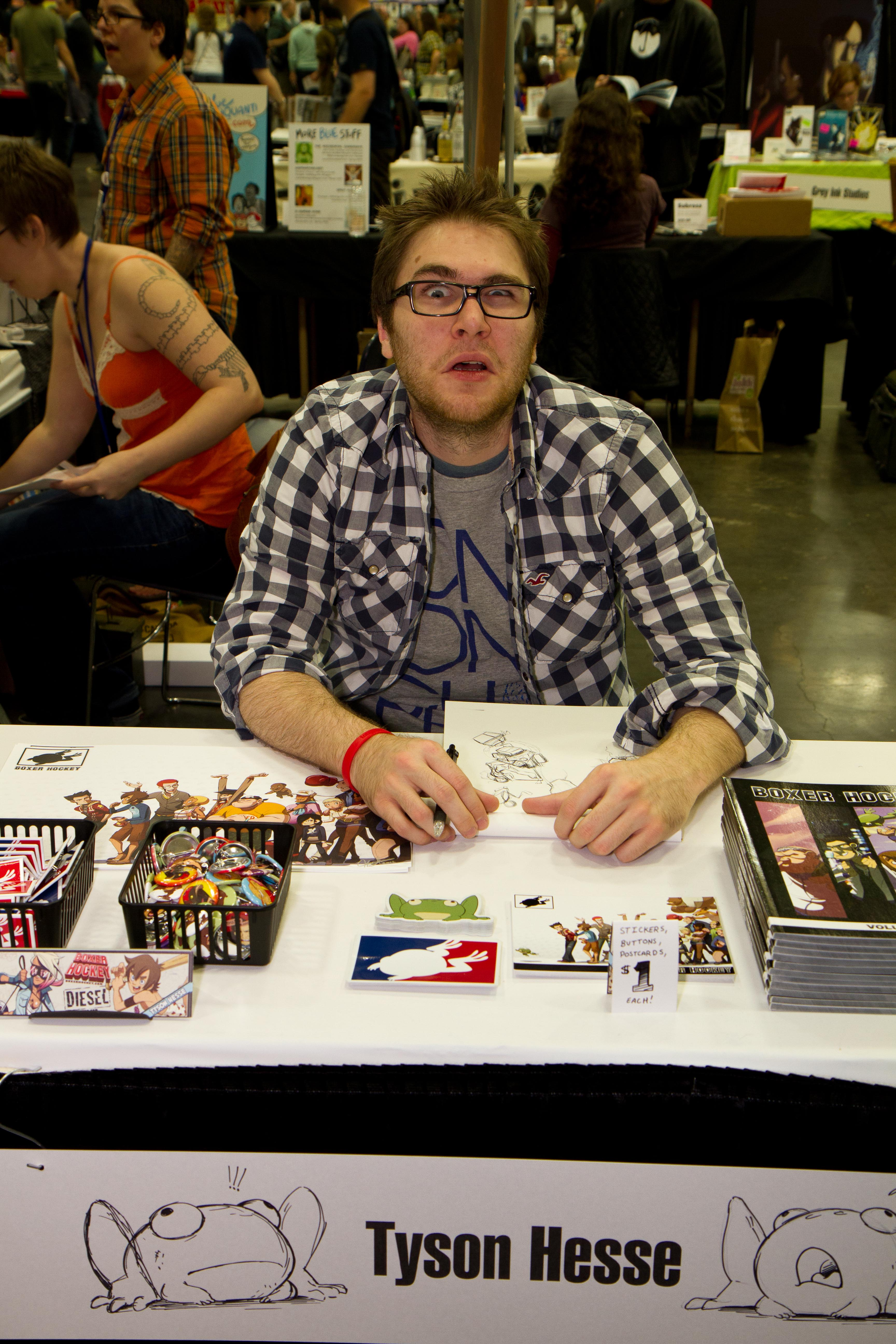
- Hesse in 2012
- Born: August 30, 1984 (age 42)
- Occupation: Illustrator
- Known for: Writing and illustrating graphic novels and comics
- Notable work: DIESEL; Sonic Mania; Sonic Mania Adventures; Sonic the Hedgehog; Sonic Origins; Sonic Frontiers Prologue: Divergence
- Parent: Bert Hesse

Tyson Hesse (born August 30, 1984) is an American artist and animator. He is best known for his work on the Sonic the Hedgehog franchise.

Hesse is the creator of the webcomic Boxer Hockey and the graphic novel Diesel and Diesel: Ignition. He has contributed art to many cartoon spin-off comics and drew the comic book spin-off of The Amazing World of Gumball. He was a storyboard artist for the film Invader Zim: Enter the Florpus.

== Career ==
=== Webcomics ===
Hesse produced the webcomic Boxer Hockey, which he started in 2006. Hesse also created the graphic novel Diesel and its follow-up, Tyson Hesse's Diesel: Ignition. The graphic novel follows Diana "Dee" Diesel, a teenager about to become captain of an airship colony, who gets caught in a war.

Hesse created the Sonic the Hedgehog fan comic Sonic’s Big Fat Adventure, that became a viral phenomenon. He pitched the comic to an Archie Comics editor and he was hired to provide art for the company.

=== Sonic the Hedgehog ===
Hesse worked as an artist for the Sonic the Hedgehog comic series from Archie Comics. He later served as the animation director on trailers and animated cutscenes for the 2017 platform game Sonic Mania and its promotional mini-series, Sonic Mania Adventures. Hesse also directed the Team Sonic Racing Overdrive shorts which promoted 2019's Team Sonic Racing, the animated cutscenes for 2022's Sonic Origins, and the promotional animated short for 2022's Sonic Frontiers, Sonic Frontiers Prologue: Divergence. Hesse has also contributed to IDW Publishing's Sonic the Hedgehog comic series.

After the trailer for the 2020 Sonic the Hedgehog film was released in 2019 and Sonic's design was strongly criticised, Hesse was brought in as the lead artist to redesign Sonic. Hesse returned for the sequel as the character design lead, storyboard supervisor, and co-producer. He was also a co-producer on the TV spin-off series Knuckles.

=== Other work ===
Hesse drew The Amazing World of Gumball spin-off comic. He also contributed artwork to other spin-off comics including ones for Adventure Time, Adventure Time: Fionna and Cake, and Bravest Warriors.

He was a storyboard artist for the film Invader Zim: Enter the Florpus. Hesse contributed art to the video game Dream Daddy.

== Bibliography ==
Name	No. of issues	Run	ASIN or ISBN(s)	Publisher	Notes
Diesel	5	September 9, 2015 - December 7, 2016	ISBN 9781681595979; ISBN 9781681595986; ISBN 9781681595993; ISBN 9781681596006; ISBN 9781613985786	Boom! Studios	
The Amazing World of Gumball	8	June 2014 – March 2015		Boom! Studios	
Sonic the Hedgehog	6	April 4, 2018 – present	B0798377X8; B079835THK; B07981PS39; B079839QRM; B084HP8BPB	IDW Publishing	Cover art

== Filmography ==
- Sonic Mania Opening animation (art direction, storyboarding, producer), Ending animation, Pre-order trailer, Mania Plus Pre-order trailer.
- Sonic Mania Adventures (director, writer, storyboard, art director, production designer)
- Team Sonic Racing Overdrive (director, storyboard, art director, production designer, audio mixing)
- Chao In Space (director, writer, animation, storyboard artist, music and dialogue editor)
- Sonic Colors: Rise of the Wisps (director, writer, production design, logo animation, compositor, music and dialogue editor, sound effects)
- Sonic Frontiers Prologue: Divergence (director)
- Sonic Superstars: Trio of Trouble (co-director)
- Sonic the Hedgehog (film series):
  - Sonic the Hedgehog (film) (lead Sonic designer)
  - Sonic the Hedgehog 2 (film) (co-producer, lead designer, storyboard supervisor)
  - Sonic the Hedgehog 3 (film) (co-producer, lead designer)
  - Sonic the Hedgehog 4 (film) (co-producer, lead designer)
- The Sheep Detectives (Executive Producer and Animation Producer)
