= Sonic Mania Adventures =

Animated miniseries

- Genre: Action; Adventure; Comedy
- Based on: Sonic the Hedgehog by Sega
- Written by: Tyson Hesse
- Directed by: Tyson Hesse
- Music by: Tee Lopes
- No. of episodes: 6

Production
- Producer: Yukio Kusumoto
- Running time: 2–3 minutes
- Production company: Neko Productions

Original release
- Network: YouTube
- Release: March 30 – December 20, 2018

Related
- Sonic Mania (2017)

Sonic Mania Adventures is an animated web miniseries released in 2018 on the Sonic the Hedgehog YouTube channel. It was created to promote the release of Sonic Mania Plus, a downloadable content add-on for Sonic Mania (2017). The series follows Sonic returning home after the events of Sonic Forces (2017), only for he and his friends to be forced to stop Doctor Eggman's latest attempt to acquire the Chaos Emeralds. Episodes were released monthly between March and July, with a special holiday-themed episode released the following December. The events of the series take place after Sonic's return to Sonic Mania Plus and before the gameplay of Encore Mode begins.

== Production and release ==
Sonic Mania Adventures was conceived following the positive reactions to Sonic Mania's animated intro and trailers. The series was written and directed by Tyson Hesse who also animated it, with animation production by Neko Productions; while Sonic Mania composer Tee Lopes scored its music. The series features no dialogue, with the story being conveyed entirely through its visuals. During series' development the team had hoped to include Amy Rose as a featured character, but they were unable to find a space to introduce her appropriately. While producing episodes 4 and 5, an idea for how to incorporate her was conceived.

The series was officially announced on March 16, 2018, and premiered on March 30. Each episode was released monthly through the following July, with a compilation of all five episodes released alongside the finale. A holiday special was released on December 20, 2018. Sega released a papercraft-themed video based on Mania Adventures on January 17, 2019. A selection of music tracks from the series were released the same year. All episodes of the series were included as unlockables in Sonic Origins (2022).

== Episodes ==
| No. | Title | Original release date |
|---|---|---|
| 1 | "Sonic Returns" | March 30, 2018 |
Sonic returns to his world, arriving on Angel Island. There, he catches Eggman flying by in his Egg Mobile, carrying a capsule of Flickies. He rescues them, but is caught in a trap. Eggman mocks him, only for Sonic to use a Chaos Emerald to lure him into his own trap. Sonic breaks free and, learning Eggman already has four other Emeralds and is seeking the remaining two, leaves Eggman to get blown up by his trap.
| 2 | "Sonic and Tails" | April 30, 2018 |
Sonic reunites with Tails, who detects one of the missing Chaos Emeralds. Sonic follows the signal, where he discovers Eggman digging for the Emerald. Though he is at first overwhelmed, Sonic teams up with Tails to defeat Eggman, claiming the sixth Chaos Emerald. Learning that Knuckles and the Master Emerald are nearby, Eggman steals Tails' plane, the Tornado, and pursues them.
| 3 | "& Knuckles" | May 31, 2018 |
Knuckles is protecting the Master Emerald. Ray arrives in search of Mighty; mistakenly believing he is attempting to steal the Emerald, Knuckles throws him far away. A group of Eggman's robots attacks Knuckles, who repels them, with Eggman stealing the Master Emerald while he is distracted. Seeing the Tornado fly away with the Master Emerald, Knuckles assumes Sonic is the thief and gives chase.
| 4 | "Mighty and Ray" | June 22, 2018 |
Ray is attacked by Metal Sonic, who is searching for the Chaos Emerald, but is rescued by the arriving Mighty. Detecting a Chaos Emerald in Mighty's possession, Metal Sonic takes Ray hostage and demands the Emerald in exchange. Mighty reluctantly relents, but he and Ray follow Metal Sonic towards Eggman's base, with Sonic, Tails, and Knuckles also approaching from opposite directions.
| 5 | "Metal Mayhem" | July 17, 2018 |
As Sonic and Tails arrive inside Eggman's base, Metal Sonic ambushes them and steals their Chaos Emeralds. Now possessing all seven, Eggman uses them to power up Metal Sonic. Sonic and Tails are overwhelmed until Ray and Mighty arrive, and the four heroes team up against Metal Sonic. Tails hacks into Eggman's systems and catches Metal Sonic in one of Eggman's traps, allowing him to forcibly eject the Chas Emeralds. As Eggman attempts to harness the Master Emerald, Knuckles arrives and punches Metal Sonic and Eggman away before retrieving the Master Emerald. With the situation resolved, Sonic, Tails, Mighty and Ray celebrate with a picnic.
| 6 | "From: A. Rose" | December 20, 2018 |
After their defeat, Eggman returns to his base, leaving the damaged Metal Sonic behind. Months later, Amy comes across the inert Metal Sonic. Seeing him in his broken state and feeling sorry for him, Amy drags Metal Sonic back to Eggman's base, presenting him as a holiday gift to Eggman.

== Reception ==
Sonic Mania Adventures was positively received. Game Informer's Brian Shea praised its animation and music. Allegra Frank of Polygon called the series "an adorable and well-deserved spotlight for the character."

Ollie Barder of Forbes praised its charm and lack of voiceover, but felt it was not as well-animated as the Sonic Mania opening animation. Joseph Knoop of The Daily Dot praised the series' animation and humor. Kyle LeClair of Hardcore Gamer called the episodes "short but sweet", feeling the series was a worthy addendum to Mania.
