= Sonic Drift =

1994 video game

- Developer: Sega
- Publisher: Sega
- Director: Katsuhiro Hasegawa
- Producer: Hiroshi Aso
- Composer: Masayuki Nagao
- Series: Sonic the Hedgehog
- Platform: Game Gear
- Release: JP: March 18, 1994
- Genre: Kart racing
- Modes: Single-player, multiplayer

Sonic Drift (Note: Japanese: ソニックドリフト, Hepburn: Sonikku Dorifuto) is a 1994 kart racing video game developed and published by Sega for the Game Gear. Players control one of four characters as they race to the finish line, with 18 tracks themed after levels in 1991's Sonic the Hedgehog.

Although it was designed with inspiration from Nintendo's 1992 game Super Mario Kart, Sonic Drift shares gameplay similarities to "Super Scaler" games previously released by Sega. Sonic Drift was released exclusively in Japan; a western release was planned but later canceled due to concerns about its quality. Sonic Drift was later released worldwide as part of Sonic Adventure DX: Director's Cut in 2003 and the compilation game Sonic Mega Collection Plus in 2004. It was released again in 2023 as part of Sonic Origins Plus.

Reception to Sonic Drift was negative, with criticism for its gameplay and lack of difficulty. A sequel, Sonic Drift 2, was not confined to Japan and released the following year.

== Gameplay ==
In-game screenshot, showing Sonic racing on a course themed after Green Hill Zone.

Sonic Drift is the first racing game in the Sonic the Hedgehog franchise. Players control one of four characters―Sonic the Hedgehog, Miles "Tails" Prower, Amy Rose, and Doctor Eggman―and race around a series of tracks, with the objective being to cross the finish line in first place. 18 tracks are featured, based on the various zones of 1991's Sonic the Hedgehog, including the Green Hill Zone. Drift is the first Sonic game to feature Amy as a playable character.

There are three game modes: Chaos GP, a grand prix mode; Free Run, a practice mode; and Versus Mode, where players can compete with one another. Chaos GP contains three separate cups of six tracks each and a points system where the goal is to earn more points than the competition. Each cup is identified with a color: green, yellow, or red.

The gameplay of Sonic Drift shares similarities with Sega's "Super Scaler"-type arcade games such as Out Run and Super Monaco GP, although with inspiration from Nintendo's Super Mario Kart. Each character has strengths and weaknesses; for instance, Sonic has fast acceleration but poor control, while Eggman has poor acceleration but moves at high speed. The top half of the player's screen shows the course map, while the bottom displays the player's car racing around the track. The game's driving mechanics focus on drifting to steer around corners at speed. Driving into television monitors scattered around the track awards the player a power-up, such as invincibility. Tracks also contain gold rings that can be collected to use a special move, which is unique for each character; for example, Sonic gets a speed boost, while Tails gets a jump.

== Development ==
Developed in-house at Sega, the game was programmed by "Wa-Da" and "Shinchan", designed by Takako Kawaguchi, Gen Adachi, Shinichi Higashi, and "K Dash", directed by Katsuhiro Hasegawa, and produced by Hiroshi Aso. The music was composed by Masayuki Nagao. The box art and manual illustrations were drawn by Yasushi Yamaguchi. Flicky was initially planned to be the fourth playable character, but was replaced with Amy Rose.

== Release ==
Sonic Drift was released in Japan for the Game Gear on March 18, 1994. The western release was canceled due to concerns regarding the game's quality. Sega instead released a Game Gear port of Sonic Spinball. Sonic Drift 2, a sequel, was released worldwide for the Game Gear in 1995. In 2003, Sonic Drift was released as an unlockable extra in Sonic Adventure DX: Director's Cut, and was later compiled into Sonic Mega Collection Plus in 2004, as well as Sonic Origins Plus on June 23, 2023. It was also included as part of a playable minigame in the 2026 Sega title Yakuza Kiwami 3 & Dark Ties.

== Reception ==
Reception

Review scores
Publication	Score
Famitsu	6/10, 5/10, 6/10, 6/10
Jeuxvideo.com	13/20
Mega Fun	65%
Sega Pro	30%
Beep! MegaDrive	6.0/10

Sonic Drift received mixed reviews. Electronic Gaming Monthly was positive towards it in a preview, saying that the game was fast-paced and enjoyable but the flashing, choppy scrolling hampered the gameplay somewhat. Three reviewers for Sega Pro gave a negative review of the game, criticizing the track designs as too similar, poor cornering controls, and low difficulty. Reviewer Mark Hill concluded his part of the review with "only a complete idiot would purchase a copy." The three reviewers were more positive about the game's graphics and sound. According to Ulf Schneider of German magazine Mega Fun, Sonic Drift does not have the same quality of gameplay as Super Mario Kart and he criticized the lack of vision of a corner until being just before one, but he also said the game was fun and easy to master even on Hard difficulty. He also commented that the controls could be figured out within a few laps of gameplay.

Retrospective feedback has been negative. The game's inclusion in Sonic Mega Collection Plus was negatively received; Chris Baker of GameSpy labeled it as "almost unplayable", while Tom Bramwell of Eurogamer called it "a terrible, terrible racing game whose flickering madness actually made me physically sick." A reviewer for Jeuxvideo.com in 2012 compared Sonic Drift to Super Mario Kart, disliking Drift for being too simplistic and very easy to finish, alongside the general lack of content and poor presentation. The reviewer stated, "Too simple and too fast to finish, Sonic Drift is unfortunately not a title that will fascinate the crowds." The staff of USgamer identified Sonic Drift's use of half the Game Gear's screen for the course map as an issue, and called the game "a poor man's Out Run". Jim McGrath of Hardcore Gaming 101 said that the gameplay itself was decent and solid, but felt that it was greatly lacking in content and variety. He criticized the track design in particular for being generally boring, lacking in presentation, and for the stage themes being purely cosmetic instead of affecting the track designs themselves. He concluded his review by stating "the small amount of content mean that it's a racer only a small number of people will dedicate themselves to." GamesTM described the title as a "lazy and cynical cash-in", saying that it did not understand what made Super Mario Kart so successful.
