= Christian Whitehead =

Australian video game programmer

- Other name: The Taxman
- Occupation: Game programmer
- Employer: Evening Star
- Known for: Developing Sonic the Hedgehog video games

Christian Whitehead, also known as The Taxman, is an Australian video game programmer and designer. He is most recognized for his work creating updated ports of early games in Sega's Sonic the Hedgehog series, as well as being a lead developer of an original game in the series, Sonic Mania. In late 2018, Whitehead co-founded indie development studio Evening Star, which launched its first game, Penny's Big Breakaway, in early 2024.

== Career ==
In 2006, Whitehead worked as a freelance 3D animator with the company Kine Graffiti. Since 2009, he has focused on game development, developing various fangames based on the Sonic the Hedgehog series, starting with a 2007 fangame entitled Retro Sonic. The game became notable after its release for its accuracy to the games, despite not being a ROM hack or modification to an existing Sonic game. Retro Sonic later merged with two other Sonic fangames, Sonic XG and Sonic Nexus, to form Retro Sonic Nexus.

In 2009, Sega asked fans for ideas on a game to port to iOS. As a response, Whitehead produced a "proof-of-concept" video of Sonic CD running on an iPhone using his own custom engine, the "Retro Engine". In an interview with Steven O'Donnell of Good Game: Spawn Point, Whitehead proclaims that he spent "about a year or so" convincing Sega to let him work on the Sonic CD port. In 2009, a video regarding Sonic CD from Whitehead was taken down, leading Eurogamer to report that Whitehead possibly faced a cease and desist letter from Sega, which Whitehead claimed was false. The port was released for Xbox 360, PlayStation 3, iPhone and Android in 2011. His remake was so successful that he, along with developer Simon "Stealth" Thomley of the studio Headcannon, would later be commissioned to remaster Sonic the Hedgehog and Sonic the Hedgehog 2 for mobile devices.

Although he, along with Headcannon, released a proof-of-concept video for a Sonic the Hedgehog 3 remaster in 2014, Sega did not greenlight the port, which Thomley assumed to be in part because of Michael Jackson's contribution to the music. In 2015, it was announced that Whitehead would be involved in his first non-Sonic game, Freedom Planet 2. In 2017, Whitehead, in collaboration with Headcannon and PagodaWest Games, developed and released their own original title in the Sonic series, titled Sonic Mania. In 2018, Sonic Mania was re-released as Sonic Mania Plus, which added additional content to the original game. Sonic Mania Plus was developed by Whitehead, Headcannon, PagodaWest Games, and the now included Hyperkinetic Studios. Whitehead also contributed to the development of Sonic Origins, providing a new version of the engine used in the remasters.

In late 2018, Whitehead and other development members behind Sonic Mania founded their own studio Evening Star, where he serves as creative director and lead engine architect. In 2022, the studio signed a publishing deal with Private Division; their first title, Penny's Big Breakaway, was released in 2024.

=== Retro Engine ===
The Retro Engine is primarily tailored for creating two-dimensional games like those released for 32-bit or below-era consoles, such as the Sega Saturn, Sega Genesis or the Super Nintendo Entertainment System. For this reason, the engine focuses more on raster graphics and palette manipulation, although it does feature support for widescreen graphics and online functionality.

Whitehead created the Retro Engine for use in Retro Sonic in 2007. He would also use the engine to develop remasters of Sonic the Hedgehog and Sonic the Hedgehog 2 using the engine, released for mobile platforms in 2013. A proof-of-concept remaster of Sonic 3 & Knuckles proposed by Whitehead and Thomley but not approved by Sega was to use the engine. The engine went on to see further use with Sonic Mania, as well as its downloadable content Sonic Mania Plus, before being converted to full 3D for Penny's Big Breakaway. This iteration was initially called the Star Engine, as it was revamped for the new game, but was changed back to strengthen ties with Whitehead's previous work, as well as to avoid confusion with Cloud Imperium Games' engine named StarEngine.

The Retro Engine was also used by Sega for their compilation Sonic Origins in 2022, which includes remakes of Sonic the Hedgehog, Sonic the Hedgehog 2, Sonic CD, and Sonic 3 & Knuckles (with the music problems solved by compositions of original tracks); Whitehead updated the engine for the release but otherwise had no involvement.

== Works ==
Year	Title	Collaborator(s)	Publisher	Platforms
2007	Retro Sonic	—N/a	self-published	Windows, Dreamcast
2008	Sonic Nexus	Brad Flick and Hunter Bridges	self-published	Windows, Mac OS X
2011	Sonic CD	BlitWorks (PC/Console port)	Sega	Xbox 360, PlayStation 3, iOS, Android, Ouya, Windows, Apple TV, Amazon Fire TV
2013	Sonic the Hedgehog	Headcannon	Sega	iOS, Android, Apple TV, Amazon Fire TV
2013	Sonic the Hedgehog 2	Headcannon	Sega	iOS, Android, Apple TV, Amazon Fire TV
2017	Sonic Mania	Headcannon, PagodaWest Games, Hyperkinetic Studios (Plus update), Tantalus Media (Switch port), Lab42 (Mobile)	Sega	Nintendo Switch, Xbox One, PlayStation 4, Windows, Android, iOS
2022	Sonic Origins	Headcannon and Sonic Team	Sega	Nintendo Switch, Xbox One, Xbox Series X/S, PlayStation 5, PlayStation 4, Windows
2022	Freedom Planet 2	GalaxyTrail	GalaxyTrail	Windows, macOS, Linux
2023	Sonic Origins Plus	Headcannon and Sonic Team	Sega	Nintendo Switch, Xbox One, Xbox Series X/S, PlayStation 5, PlayStation 4, Windows
2024	Penny's Big Breakaway	Evening Star	Private Division	Nintendo Switch, PlayStation 5, Xbox Series X/S, Windows
