= Sonic the Hedgehog 3 =

1994 video game

- North American Genesis box art
- Developer: Sega Technical Institute
- Publisher: Sega
- Director: Hirokazu Yasuhara
- Producer: Yuji Naka
- Designers: Hirokazu Yasuhara; Hisayoshi Yoshida; Takashi Iizuka
- Programmers: Yuji Naka; Hiroshi Nikaidoh; Masanobu Yamamoto
- Artists: Takashi Yuda; Satoshi Yokokawa
- Composers: Brad Buxer: Bobby Brooks; Darryl Ross; Geoff Grace; Doug Grigsby III; Cirocco Jones; Sega Sound Team: Tokuhiko Uwabo; Sachio Ogawa; Yoshiaki Kashima; Masaru Setsumaru; Tatsuyuki Maeda; Tomonori Sawada; Masayuki Nagao; Jun Senoue
- Series: Sonic the Hedgehog
- Platforms: Sega Genesis, Windows
- Release: Genesis: NA: February 2, 1994; EU: February 24, 1994; JP: May 27, 1994; Windows: JP: February 14, 1997; NA: March 14, 1997; EU: March 20, 1997
- Genre: Platform
- Modes: Single-player, multiplayer

Sonic the Hedgehog 3 (Note: Japanese: ソニック・ザ・ヘッジホッグ3, Hepburn: Sonikku za Hejjihoggu Surī) is a 1994 platform game developed by Sega Technical Institute and published by Sega for the Sega Genesis. Like previous Sonic games, players traverse side-scrolling levels while collecting rings and defeating enemies. They control Sonic and Tails, who attempt to retrieve the Chaos Emeralds to stop Doctor Robotnik from relaunching his space station, the Death Egg, after it crash-lands on a mysterious floating island. Sonic 3 introduces Knuckles the Echidna, the island guardian, who lays traps for Sonic and Tails.

Development began in January 1993 by Sega Technical Institute in California, shortly after the release of Sonic the Hedgehog 2. It was initially developed as an isometric game, similar to what became Sonic 3D Blast (1996), but became a conventional 2D platformer due to time constraints. The pop musician Michael Jackson composed portions of the soundtrack but left the project and went uncredited; sources vary on how much of his work was retained, and many tracks were replaced in rereleases.

Sonic 3 was developed simultaneously with Sonic & Knuckles; they were planned as a single game until time constraints and cartridge costs forced the developers to split it. The Sonic 3 cartridge can be attached to an adapter on the Sonic & Knuckles cartridge, creating a combined game, Sonic the Hedgehog 3 & Knuckles.

Sonic 3 was released in North America and Europe in February 1994, and in Japan in May. As with its predecessors, it was a critical and commercial success, with critics seeing it as an improvement over previous installments. Sonic 3 and Sonic & Knuckles sold a combined four million copies worldwide, placing them among the bestselling Genesis games. They have been rereleased in various compilations.

== Gameplay ==
Sonic and Tails exploring the underwater portion of Hydrocity, the game's second zone

Sonic the Hedgehog 3 is a 2D side-scrolling platformer. As with Sonic the Hedgehog 2, players control Sonic while Tails runs along beside him; a second player can join at any time and control Tails separately. Players may also play as Sonic or Tails alone. Sonic 3 adds the ability for Tails to fly for a short time by spinning his twin tails like a helicopter rotor. Unlike Sonic, Tails can also swim underwater.

Sonic 3 takes place over six zones, each divided into two acts. Levels are populated with "Badniks", robots created by the villain, Dr. Robotnik; Sonic and Tails can defeat them by jumping on them or using the "spin dash" attack, which also gives the character a speed boost. The levels include obstacles and other features such as vertical loops, corkscrews, breakable walls, spikes, water that the player can drown in, and bottomless pits. There is a miniboss fight with one of Robotnik's large, powerful robots at the end of the first act of each level and a boss fight with Robotnik at the end of the second. Reaching a new level saves the game to one of six save slots.

As with previous Sonic games, Sonic 3 uses rings, scattered throughout the levels, as a health system; when the player is attacked without rings, is crushed, falls off-screen, drowns, or exceeds the act's ten-minute limit, they lose a life and return to the most recently passed checkpoint. Dying with zero lives gives the player a game over. The levels also include power-ups in television monitors that, when hit, grant the character an extra life, temporary invincibility to most hazards, a number of rings, a shield that allows them to breathe underwater, a shield that allows them to withstand fire from enemy projectiles, or a shield that attracts nearby rings.

Sonic 3 contains two types of bonus stages. When the player collects at least 50 rings and passes a checkpoint, they can warp to the first type, which involves bouncing up a gumball machine-like corridor to earn power-ups by hitting a switch. Both sides of the corridor are lined with flippers, which disappear when the character bounces on them, and the switch drops when both flippers supporting it are removed. The corridor's floor contains a bounce pad, which also disappears after one use; falling afterwards causes the player to leave the stage with the most recent power-up collected.

Tails in one of the special stages, in which the player can collect blue spheres to earn Chaos Emeralds

The second type, triggered by entering giant rings found in secret passages, involves running around a 3D map and passing through all of a number of blue spheres arranged in patterns. Passing through a blue sphere turns it red, and touching a red sphere causes the player to leave the stage, unless the player has just completed a cycle around an arrangement of blue spheres, in which case all of these spheres turn to harmless rings. Removing all of the blue spheres gives the player a Chaos Emerald; if Sonic (not Tails) collects all seven, he unlocks the ability to become Super Sonic, which makes him invincible to most obstacles. Failing to collect the seven Chaos Emeralds triggers a post-credits scene in which Robotnik and Knuckles taunt the player.

Sonic 3 includes a competitive mode: two players, controlling Sonic, Tails, or Knuckles, race through one or all of five stages that do not appear in the main game. In these same stages, a single player can compete against the clock in time attacks.

=== Sonic 3 & Knuckles ===
Sonic the Hedgehog 3 and Sonic & Knuckles were planned as a single game, but were released separately due to time constraints caused by a McDonald's promotion and cartridge size limitations. The Sonic & Knuckles cartridge features a "lock-on" adapter that allows other Genesis cartridges to be attached. Connecting the Sonic 3 cartridge creates a combined game, Sonic 3 & Knuckles. The lock-on function is available in most re-releases.

Sonic the Hedgehog 3 & Knuckles allows the player to play Sonic 3 levels as Knuckles or Sonic & Knuckles levels as Tails, or both Sonic and Tails. Other new features are the ability to collect Super Emeralds, unlocking new "Hyper" forms for Sonic and Knuckles and a "Super" form for Tails; improved save options; access to areas that Sonic or Tails could not previously access; altered boss forms; and an additional ending that shows Sonic returning the Master Emerald to Angel Island.

== Plot ==
After Sonic and Tails defeat Dr. Robotnik in Sonic the Hedgehog 2, Robotnik's space station, the Death Egg, crash-lands on the floating Angel Island. The impact from the Death Egg's crash causes the island to fall into the ocean. There, Robotnik meets Knuckles the Echidna, the last member of an ancient echidna civilization that once inhabited the island. Knuckles is the guardian of the Master Emerald, which grants the island its levitation power and has an equal power level of the seven Chaos Emeralds. Robotnik dupes Knuckles into believing Sonic is trying to steal the Master Emerald, and that the launch base is Sonic's base, turning the two against each other while he repairs the Death Egg.

Sonic and Tails approach Angel Island in their biplane, the Tornado. Sonic uses the Chaos Emeralds to transform into Super Sonic, but Knuckles ambushes him and steals the emeralds. Sonic and Tails travel the island hindered by Knuckles and Robotnik. At the Launch Base, where the Death Egg is under repair, Sonic and Tails fight Knuckles, but the Death Egg relaunches. On a platform attached to the Death Egg, they defeat Robotnik, causing the Death Egg to crash-land on Angel Island again. The story resumes in Sonic & Knuckles.

== Development ==
Like Sonic the Hedgehog 2, Sonic the Hedgehog 3 was developed in California by Sega Technical Institute (STI). After the completion of Sonic 2, the producer, Yuji Naka, refused to develop another Sonic game with the Americans. STI split into two teams: one composed of Japanese developers, who worked on Sonic 3, and the other Americans, who worked on Sonic Spinball. Naka and Hirokazu Yasuhara were the primary creators of the Sonic 3 design document and project schedule. Naka selected the majority of the team, while the STI director, Roger Hector, oversaw development and Pamela Kelly led the marketing.

Development began in January 1993. The team initially used the Sega Virtua Processor chip, allowing for 3D graphics. They created a prototype with isometric graphics with the working title Sonic 3D. The original special stage featured a polygonal Sonic in a figure eight-shaped stage. When it became apparent that the chip would not be finished by 1994, Sonic 3 was restarted as a more conventional 2D platform game. The designer Takashi Iizuka said the chip was an experiment to see if Sonic could work in 3D, and was abandoned due to its low polygon count. The isometric concept was eventually used for Sonic 3D Blast in 1996.

According to Naka, the team wanted a deeper story to expand the Sonic world, which greatly expanded the project size. As Sonic was an action game with international appeal, they told the story visually, using in-game cutscenes, instead of text. The levels are triple the size of those in Sonic 2. Additional bosses, different musical arrangements and graphics were used to distinguish act 1 and 2 of each stage. Many elements were conceived during the development of Sonic 2 but deferred to Sonic 3. The music in the blue sphere bonus stages was reused from SegaSonic Bros., a canceled arcade game.

Sonic 3 and Sonic & Knuckles were originally planned as a single game. However, the manufacturing costs of a 34-megabit cartridge with NVRAM would have been prohibitively expensive. Due to the game's scope and Sega of America's commitment to launch a major McDonald's Happy Meal promotion in February 1994, the team reluctantly split it in half, allowing more time to develop the second part and splitting the cost between two cartridges. The Sonic & Knuckles cartridge's lock-on technology was created, named, and implemented so Sonic 3 could be experienced as intended. Among other features, it allowed the developers to keep the paths designed for Knuckles in Sonic 3, which were inaccessible on the standalone cartridge.

Sonic 3 features the debut of Sonic's rival, Knuckles the Echidna. Many designs for the character were considered; for the final design, Takashi Yuda chose the kind of animal, and Pamela Kelly chose the name. Yuda envisioned him as a supporting character for Sonic, and felt he would make a good playable character. Whereas Sonic symbolizes speed, Knuckles symbolizes power, and the emphasis of the character was to break walls. His shoe coloration was inspired by the flag of Jamaica. The original name for the character was "Dreds", referring to his dreadlocks. The design was tested with focus groups of American children. Knuckles' climbing ability allowed the developers to introduce more vertical gameplay.

Hector said Sonic 3 had a troubled development. He recalled having to prevent the rest of Sega from bothering the team while simultaneously making sure the game would be finished in time. Additionally, Hector struggled to balance resources between Sonic 3 and other projects, Naka was sometimes seen as a harsh leader, and American STI staff not on the Sonic 3 team became jealous of the priority given to the game.

=== Michael Jackson's involvement ===
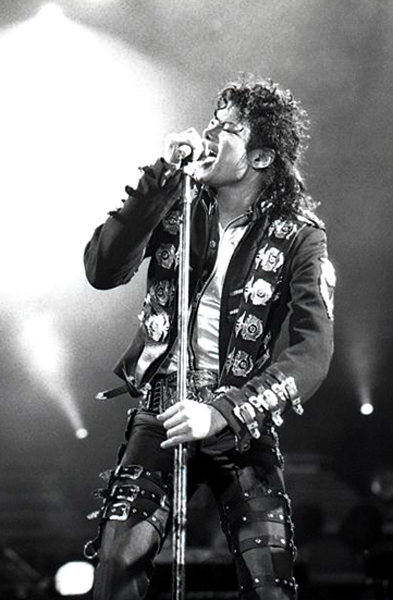
According to the development staff, Michael Jackson composed portions of the Sonic 3 soundtrack but went uncredited. His involvement was denied by senior Sega employees.

According to several sources involved in the development, Sega hired the pop musician Michael Jackson to compose music for Sonic 3, but he left the project and went uncredited. Fans speculated about similarities to Jackson's music, but his involvement was not known until Hector mentioned it in an interview in 2005.

Jackson was a Sonic fan and had collaborated with Sega on the 1990 arcade game Michael Jackson's Moonwalker. Jackson's tour director, Brad Buxer, assembled a team and worked for four weeks at Record One in Los Angeles in 1993. They developed fully fledged tracks, with extensive samples of Jackson beatboxing, to be adapted for the Genesis. Hector said the work had a recognizable Jackson sound. Naoto Ohshima, the co-creator of Sonic, said Jackson recorded an a cappella demo tape for Sonic 3. According to Naka, the development team were given a helicopter tour of Jackson's home, Neverland Ranch.

During the development, allegations of child sexual abuse against Jackson emerged. Buxer said the team received no instruction to halt work and sent the finished soundtrack to Sega in mid-1993. According to Hector and Ohshima, Jackson's involvement was terminated following the allegations. However, Buxer and two other members of Jackson's team, Doug Grigsby III and Cirocco Jones, said Jackson went uncredited because he was unhappy with how the Genesis, which was incapable of playing back high-quality audio, replicated his music.

Jackson's music had already been implemented and had to be quickly reworked by Howard Drossin, who had joined the project expecting to work with Jackson. Other tracks were composed by Sega sound team members, such as Jun Senoue, who became a regular composer for the series. According to Buxer, Grigsby, and Jones, their music remained in the game. Jones credited himself along with Jackson and Buxer for musical cues for "levels 2 & 3" of "Sonic the Hedgehog" on his website. An anonymous source involved in development also told GameTrailers that Jackson's contributions, such as the Carnival Night Zone theme, remained. In 2013, it was discovered that the music for IceCap Zone was derived from a previously unreleased 1982 song, "Hard Times", by Buxer's band the Jetzons. The Sonic 3 credits music became the basis for Jackson's 1996 single "Stranger in Moscow".

Senior Sega staff, including Sega of America's president Tom Kalinske, said that any involvement of Jackson was arranged without their knowledge, and that no formal agreements were made. In 2013, Hector said that any similarities to Jackson's music in Sonic 3 were unintentional. The journalist Ken Horowitz raised questions about Jackson's alleged involvement, such as how an agreement between Sega and Jackson could have been kept secret from the media, why Sega's marketing never mentioned Jackson's involvement and why Jackson would reuse music originally composed for a video game. According to Buxer, Jackson only worked on one of the 41 tracks that his team composed. Retro Gamer reasoned that, if this were true, it was unlikely that any music composed by Jackson himself remained in the game.

Some Sonic 3 tracks were replaced in the Windows port Sonic & Knuckles Collection, as well as the remaster included in the 2022 compilation Sonic Origins. These tracks also appear in a Sonic 3 prototype discovered in 2019, suggesting that they were written before being replaced by Jackson's music. In 2019, VG247 noted that Sonic 3 had been rereleased less frequently since Jackson's death in 2009 and speculated that this was due to legal problems with his estate.

== Release ==
Sonic 3 was released in North America on February 2, 1994 (Groundhog Day), in Europe on February 24, and in Japan on May 27. Sega spent $20 million marketing it in the United States. To promote the European release, the British band Right Said Fred adapted their song "Wonderman" to include references to Sonic. The song was used in Sonic 3 advertisements and released as a single, which charted in the UK at number 55. A single-cartridge version of Sonic 3 and Sonic & Knuckles, Sonic the Hedgehog 3 Limited Edition, was canceled. A ROM image of this version was leaked online in 2008.

=== Ports and rereleases ===
Sonic 3 is included in the compilations Sonic & Knuckles Collection (1997) for Windows, Sonic Jam (1997) for the Sega Saturn, Sonic Mega Collection (2002) for the GameCube, Sonic Mega Collection Plus (2004) for the PlayStation 2, Xbox, and Windows, Sonic's Ultimate Genesis Collection (2009) for the Xbox 360 and PlayStation 3, and Sonic Classic Collection (2010) for the Nintendo DS. The Sonic Jam version introduces "remix" options: "Normal" mode alters the layout of rings and hazards, and "Easy" mode removes certain acts.

Sonic the Hedgehog 3 was released for the Wii Virtual Console in September 2007 and Xbox Live Arcade on June 10, 2009. The Xbox Live Arcade version was developed by Backbone Entertainment and has enhanced graphics for high-definition, online leaderboards, support for multiplayer via split screen and Xbox Live, and a new saving system that allows progress to be saved anywhere during play. A PC version was released via Steam in January 2011, as Sonic 3 & Knuckles but later delisted as well as the other classic titles when Sonic Origins released.

Sonic 3 was not included in the Sega Genesis Mini (2019), a dedicated console containing 40 Genesis games. AtGames, which was briefly involved with the console's development, said the exclusion was due to licensing problems with the soundtrack. In 2014, independent developers Christian Whitehead and Simon Thomley proposed a remake of Sonic 3 & Knuckles for iOS and Android, developed using Whitehead's Retro Engine, to Sega, similar to their remake of previous Sonic games. Despite fan enthusiasm, Sega did not develop the project. Thomley speculated that this was due to legal problems regarding the music.

In 2022, Sonic 3 & Knuckles was rereleased for the first time since 2011 as part of the compilation Sonic Origins. The Origins version is a new remake running on the Retro Engine, developed by Simon Thomley of Headcannon, who previously worked on Sonic Mania and remakes of other Genesis Sonic games. Origins adds features including widescreen support and, in the expanded version, Amy Rose as a playable character. Since Sega was unable to use certain songs from the original Sonic 3 & Knuckles soundtrack, Senoue produced rearrangements of the MIDI music featured in Sonic & Knuckles Collection using the original Genesis sound chip.

== Reception ==
Contemporary reception

Review scores
Publication	Score
Computer and Video Games	94% (Sonic 3); 97% (Sonic 3 & Knuckles)
Electronic Gaming Monthly	10/10, 10/10, 9/10, 9/10
Famitsu	8/10, 7/10, 8/10, 6/10
Génération 4	93%
Hyper	90%
Mean Machines Sega	94%
Entertainment Weekly	A+
MegaTech	93%
Sega Magazine	95%
Sega Power	90%

In the United States, Sonic 3 was the top-selling Sega Genesis game in February 1994. It became one of the best-selling Genesis games, selling at least 1.02 million copies in the United States. Together, Sonic 3 and Sonic & Knuckles sold 4 million cartridges worldwide.

Like its predecessors, Sonic 3 received critical acclaim. Critics generally felt Sonic 3 was the best game in the series so far. Andrew Humphreys of Hyper, who declared himself not a Sonic fan, said it was "undoubtedly" the best of the series, including the acclaimed but obscure Sonic CD, though he said he preferred Sonic 2's special stages by a small margin. Sega Magazine, however, stated that Sonic 3 has better special stages and was not only superior to Sonic 2 as a whole but would be "a serious contender for the Best Platform Game Ever award". Sega Power wrote that despite their skepticism, they found it "excellent" and easily "the most explorable and playable" in the series. Electronic Gaming Monthly also compared Sonic 3 favorably to Sonic 1, 2, and CD and awarded it their "Game of the Month" award. They later ranked it number 1 in "The EGM Hot 50", indicating that it received the highest average score of any game they had reviewed in the past year. Lionel Vilner of Génération 4 believed Sonic 3 offered more challenge than its predecessors. The Unknown Gamer of GamePro proclaimed that it "proves that you can teach an old hedgehog new and exciting tricks. Take that old Sonic magic, add fun new variations, and you have another spectacular game."

Some critics felt that Sonic 3 had innovated too little from previous Sonic games. Humphreys of Hyper saw only "a few new features", while Sega Power thought it was "not all that different", and Nintendo Life writer Damien McFerran said that "there's not a lot of new elements here to be brutally frank". While Deniz Ahmet of Computer and Video Games agreed that the game was "more of the same", he was placated by the new and imaginative ideas. However, Electronic Gaming Monthly enjoyed the new power-ups. Many aspects of the level design were praised; Electronic Gaming Monthly and Sega Power enjoyed the expansive stages, secret areas, much less linear level design, and difficulty. Mean Machines Sega agreed, describing the game as "a rollercoaster ride from start to finish" and listing Carnival Night as their favorite level, which they described as "probably the most slickly programmed portion" of any Genesis game. Humphreys of Hyper and Mean Machines Sega felt that the game was too short, but they and Sega Magazine felt that its two-player mode and the Emerald collecting would significantly extend the replay value. Sega Magazine enjoyed having the ability to play as Knuckles in the two-player mode. The Unknown Gamer felt that while the two-player mode was less fun than the main game, it was much improved over Sonic 2 due to the change of format from split-screen to full-screen.

The visuals were very well received. Humphreys described Sonic 3 as "one of the most beautiful games around" and full of "flashy new visual tricks", highlighting Sonic's ascension up pipes and spiraling pathways as particularly inventive. Sega Magazine exclaimed that its graphics were "brilliant" even for a Sonic game. Mean Machines Sega thought similarly, giving special praise to the camera's quick scrolling, the diversity of the level themes, and the "chunkier, more detailed" overall aesthetic. Rik Skews of Computer and Video Games stated that "the graphics were stunning, attention to detail is breathtaking". Ahmet of the same publication also noted that the graphics were more detailed than those of previous installments. The Unknown Gamer described the settings as having "gorgeous background detail and lots of visual treats" and was impressed by the new obstacles that Sonic can traverse at top speeds.

The sound effects and music were also well received, though somewhat less so than the visuals. Sega Magazine described them as "brilliant" and "far superior" to Sonic 2's. Mean Machines Sega stated that every level had "great tunes" and sound effects and particularly praised the ending music. However, Humphreys described the sound as "Sonicky ... with the emphasis on the 'icky'"; he also found it strikingly similar to the first two Sonic games' soundtracks. The Unknown Gamer also heard musical similarity to previous installments, and described the individual tracks as "catchy... until you've heard it a hundred times."

Following the release of Sonic & Knuckles, the Sonic 3 & Knuckles version of the game was critically acclaimed. Computer and Video Games rated this version of the game 97% and said, while "you need to buy both Sonic 3 and Sonic and Knuckles to fully enjoy" it, Sonic 3 & Knuckles "is the best platform experience ever" and "what video games were invented for."

=== Retrospective reviews ===
Retrospective reception

Aggregate scores
Aggregator	Score
GameRankings	89% (Genesis/Wii)
Metacritic	79/100 (X360)

Review scores
Publication	Score
Eurogamer	8/10 (X360)
GameSpot	8/10 (Wii)
IGN	9/10 (Wii); 8/10 (X360)
Nintendo Life	8/10 (Wii)
PALGN	7/10 (X360)

At the review aggregator GameRankings, Sonic 3 holds a score of 89%, based on five reviews published in the 2000s. The Xbox 360 version has a score of 79% at Metacritic. Lucas M. Thomas of IGN wrote that Sonic 3 "completed the trilogy as the best of them all". Dan Whitehead of Eurogamer, however, considered Sonic & Knuckles superior.

Frank Provo of GameSpot wrote that the most significant addition was its save system. He also enjoyed the new power-ups and praised the "elaborate" backgrounds. Whitehead said that the large stages would keep players sufficiently engrossed. Thomas and Provo enjoyed the use of wordless cutscenes to create a coherent story and thematically connect the zones. McFerran, however, felt that the visuals had been downgraded, particularly Sonic's "dumpier" sprite and "the infamous 'dotty' textures". Thomas thought the music was "impressive", but not quite on par with Sonic 2's.

Some critics, such as Adam Ghiggino of PALGN, felt Sonic 3 had been insufficiently upgraded for re-releases. Whitehead of Eurogamer wished online co-op had been implemented. Provo of GameSpot and Thomas of IGN wished that Sega had re-released Sonic 3 and Sonic & Knuckles together as Sonic 3 & Knuckles instead. Mega ranked it the fifth-best Genesis game in November 1994. In 2014, GamesRadar ranked Sonic 3 & Knuckles as the seventh-best Genesis game. In 2013, Jeremy Parish of US Gamer ranked it eighth.

== Legacy ==
Sonic 3 was the first appearance of Knuckles the Echidna, who featured prominently in later Sonic games. Sonic the Comic (UK) and the Archie Sonic the Hedgehog comic (US) published adaptations of Sonic 3. For Sonic's 20th anniversary, Sega released Sonic Generations in 2011, which remakes elements of various Sonic games. The Nintendo 3DS version features a remake of the final boss and a rearranged version of the "Game Over" theme. The Hydrocity Zone level appears in the 2017 game Sonic Mania. Elements of the 2022 film Sonic the Hedgehog 2 were based on Sonic 3.

=== IceCap Zone ===
The opening of IceCap Zone, featuring Sonic snowboarding down a mountain.

IceCap Zone, Sonic 3's fifth level, has been very well received, widely regarded for its soundtrack. Comics Gaming Magazine praises the gameplay and music. PCMag praises the level design. TheGamer lists it as one of the best Sonic the Hedgehog levels, writing, "once you hear that amazing music and start snowboarding through IceCap Zone as Sonic, you know you’re in for a treat". GameIndustry.biz wrote "it is my personal goal in every play session to reach at least the IceCap Zone in order to be rewarded with what is undoubtedly the best song of the game". WhatCulture called the level "a beautifully glistening glacier with the perfect rhythm to match its rime". IGN wrote, "racing around the level while breaking through walls of snow and chunks of ice, Sonic’s frenetic movement is backed by gorgeous visuals and an awesome soundtrack". Kotaku praises the level design, music, and Sonic's snowboard entry.

The level itself has reappeared sparingly within the Sonic series. It is available as a track in Sonic Drift 2 (1995). It reappears as a level in Sonic Adventure (1998). It makes a cameo appearance in Sonic Mania Adventures (2018) in the episode, "From: A. Rose". It is also referenced in the 2022 film Sonic the Hedgehog 2.
