= Sonic Mania =

2017 video game

- Promotional artwork, featuring Sonic, Tails and Knuckles
- Developers: Christian Whitehead (Note: Ported to Nintendo Switch by Tantalus Media and mobile by Lab42); PagodaWest Games; Headcannon; Hyperkinetic Studios (Plus)
- Publisher: Sega (Note: Mobile version published by Netflix, Inc.)
- Director: Christian Whitehead
- Producers: Lola Shiraishi; Miki Takahashi; Terri Watanabe
- Designer: Jared Kasl
- Programmers: Christian Whitehead; Simon Thomley
- Artist: Tom Fry
- Composer: Tee Lopes
- Series: Sonic the Hedgehog
- Engine: Retro Engine
- Platforms: Nintendo Switch; PlayStation 4; Xbox One; Windows; iOS; Android; Netflix
- Release: NS, PS4, Xbox One: WW: August 15, 2017; JP/AS: August 16, 2017; Windows: WW: August 29, 2017; Sonic Mania Plus; NS, PS4, Windows, Xbox One: WW: July 17, 2018; JP: July 19, 2018; Android, iOS: WW: May 7, 2024
- Genre: Platform
- Modes: Single-player, multiplayer

Sonic Mania is a 2017 platform game developed by Christian Whitehead, PagodaWest Games and Headcannon and published by Sega. Produced in commemoration of the Sonic the Hedgehog series' 25th anniversary, Sonic Mania pays homage to the original Sega Genesis Sonic games, featuring speedy side-scrolling gameplay. It takes place over 13 levels, including several redesigned from past games. The story follows Sonic, Tails and Knuckles as they venture to defeat Doctor Eggman and his robotic henchmen, the Hard-Boiled Heavies.

The development team was composed of members known for their work in the Sonic fangame and ROM hacking community. Development began after lead developer, director and programmer Christian "Taxman" Whitehead, who was previously contracted by Sega to develop enhanced mobile ports of Genesis Sonic games, presented a playable prototype to Sonic Team producer Takashi Iizuka. Art, level design, audio, and additional programming were provided by independent studios PagodaWest Games and Headcannon. The team used Whitehead's Retro Engine and aimed for a graphical quality between Genesis and Sega Saturn games.

Sonic Mania was released in August 2017 for the Nintendo Switch, PlayStation 4, Xbox One and Windows. It became the highest-rated Sonic game in fifteen years; many reviewers saw it as a return to form following a number of poorly received games released after the 1990s. Its presentation, level design, music, and faithfulness to the early Sonic games were praised, but its lack of originality was criticized. Several critics named it one of the best Sonic games and one of the best games of 2017. Within a year, it had sold over one million copies. Sonic Mania Plus, an enhanced version with additional content, was released in July 2018.

== Gameplay ==
Gameplay screenshot showing Sonic in Studiopolis Zone, the first of five original levels in Sonic Mania

Sonic Mania is a side-scrolling platformer similar to the early Sonic the Hedgehog games released for the Sega Genesis and Sega CD. Players select one of three playable characters, each with unique abilities: Sonic can perform a "drop dash" which sends him rolling in a dash after a jump, Tails can fly and swim, and Knuckles can glide and climb walls. As with Sonic 2 (1992) and Sonic 3 (1994), players can play as Sonic and Tails simultaneously, or a second player can control Tails independently. Unlockable options include Sonic's abilities from Sonic CD (1993) and Sonic 3 in place of the drop dash, and the ability to control any character alongside Knuckles.

Sonic Mania takes place over 13 levels, called zones. Eight are "remixed" from previous games, such as Green Hill Zone from the first Sonic (1991). Remixed stages consist of new elements and elements from past games. Each zone is divided into two acts, in which the player must guide their character past enemies and obstacles to reach the end. At the end of each act, the player takes part in a boss battle against Doctor Eggman, also known as Dr. Robotnik, or one of his robots, including the Hard-Boiled Heavies, elite henchmen based on the EggRobo enemies from Sonic 3 & Knuckles. The player collects golden rings, a form of health; players survive hits as long as they have at least one ring; if hit, their rings scatter and disappear after a short time. Television monitors containing rings, elemental shields, or power-ups such as invincibility and increased speed are scattered throughout each level. Like Sonic 3 & Knuckles, the story is told via short cutscenes between levels.

Giant rings hidden in each act, a feature of the original games, lead to pseudo-3D special stages similar to those in Sonic CD. Players dodge obstacles and collect colored spheres to increase their speed, allowing them to pursue a UFO carrying a Chaos Emerald; collecting all seven Chaos Emeralds allows players to use their character's super transformation and unlocks the true ending. Players' ring counters slowly decrease during special stages and must be continually replenished; if players run out of rings before they catch the UFO, the special stage ends. The "Blue Sphere" special stages from Sonic the Hedgehog 3 are repurposed as bonus stages accessed by entering a portal that appears when the player passes a checkpoint while carrying 25 or more rings. Completing bonus stages earns the player a silver or gold medal; collecting medals unlocks features such as a debug mode and sound test.

In the time attack mode, players must complete levels as quickly as possible, with the best times included on an online leaderboard. Players can instantly reload a level to try again at any time. The split-screen competitive multiplayer mode allows two players to race to the end of a level, similar to those of Sonic 2. Players can also unlock "Mean Bean", a two-player minigame based on Dr. Robotnik's Mean Bean Machine.

== Plot ==
After the events of Sonic & Knuckles, Sonic and Tails detect a powerful energy reading on Angel Island and board their biplane, the Tornado, to investigate. However, Dr. Eggman sends an elite group of EggRobos to reach the signal before Sonic and Tails. The EggRobos excavate the source of the signal, a magical gemstone called the Phantom Ruby, just as Sonic and Tails arrive. The EggRobos gain new powers from the ruby, becoming the Hard-Boiled Heavies, and send Sonic, Tails, and the island's guardian, Knuckles, through zones the trio have previously visited where they pursue Eggman to prevent him from using the ruby's power for evil, clashing with him and the Heavies along the way.

Sonic and his allies discover that Eggman has used the Phantom Ruby's power to retake control of Little Planet from Sonic CD. They board Eggman's robotic fortress, defeat him and the Heavies, and escape just as it explodes. If all seven Chaos Emeralds are collected while playing as Sonic, the Phantom Ruby transports him and Eggman to another dimension. There, the Heavies' leader, Heavy King, betrays Eggman and takes the ruby, imbuing himself with power; Eggman attacks the Heavy to try to reclaim it. Sonic uses the Chaos Emeralds to become Super Sonic and fights Eggman and the Heavy King separately to keep the ruby out of their possession. After the battle, the Phantom Ruby reacts with the Emeralds, negating Sonic's super state and creating a wormhole that engulfs itself and Sonic as Little Planet vanishes.

=== Sonic Mania Plus ===
Upon returning to his world, Sonic is transported to Angel Island, where he comes across Mighty the Armadillo and Ray the Flying Squirrel. He then encounters the Hard-Boiled Heavies, who are damaged from their fights against Sonic and his friends. The Heavy King grabbed the Phantom Ruby and used its power to take Sonic and his four friends back to the beginning of their adventure. Sonic and his friends travel through the areas again, but differently this time.

After defeating Eggman and the Heavies again, if all seven Chaos Emeralds are collected again, the Phantom Ruby makes Eggman's robotic fortress explode again. However, this time, Sonic and his allies use the Chaos Emeralds to activate their super forms to escape while Eggman is sent into a portal created by the Phantom Ruby. Sonic and his friends celebrate their victory in a bar in the Mirage Saloon Zone, but the Heavy King surprises them.

== Development ==
An unfinished desert level from Sonic 2 (top) served as inspiration for Sonic Mania's Mirage Saloon Zone (bottom).

Development of Sonic Mania began in 2015, led by Australian programmer Christian "Taxman" Whitehead. Whitehead was a prominent member of the Sonic fangame community, and had previously been contracted by Sega to develop remastered ports of Sonic the Hedgehog, Sonic 2, and Sonic CD for mobile phones. After developing the game for a few months, Whitehead presented a prototype, which he called Sonic Discovery, to series producer Takashi Iizuka. Iizuka was receptive, and suggested that it should include old levels from the early Sonic games it was inspired by, "remixed" in a way that felt new. He also gave it the working title of Sonic Mania, which stuck after no one suggested a better one. The title referenced the development team's "maniacal" fandom for the series; Iizuka described the project as being made "by the mania, for the mania", and as a "passion product" driven by the fans' love for the early Sonic games.

Sonic Mania was produced in commemoration of the series' 25th anniversary. It was developed using Whitehead's Retro Engine, a game engine tailored for creating two-dimensional games, which he also used for the enhanced ports of Sonic the Hedgehog, Sonic 2, and Sonic CD. The team also included programmer Simon "Stealth" Thomley of the independent studio Headcannon, who assisted Whitehead with those projects and on various Sonic fangames and ROM hacks, as well as level designer Jared Kasl and art director Tom Fry of PagodaWest Games, who had previously independently collaborated on an unofficial high-definition remaster of Sonic 2. Tantalus Media helped develop the Nintendo Switch port. Iizuka and the rest of Sonic Team provided guidance and made sure the team didn't "go off the rails into something that doesn't feel like Sonic". Iizuka described the visuals as a cross between the graphical capabilities of the Genesis and Sega Saturn, comprising mostly pixel art with some polygonal graphics.

The developers modeled the gameplay on Sonic 3, with boss fights at the end of each zone. For returning stages, the designers made the first act feel familiar, and introduced new elements in the second act. The team cited Sonic CD and Sonic 3 as major influences on the level design for their "big, wide open" and "streamlined" designs, respectively. According to Thomley, the team typically decided what elements to include in the returning stages prior to designing them, but sometimes came up with new ideas or changed them based on how the development progressed. The first original level designed was the Hollywood-themed Studiopolis Zone. The desert-themed Mirage Saloon Zone was inspired by an unfinished level from Sonic 2 and the Monument Valley region of the United States. The special stages were inspired by more recent games such as Sonic Rush (2005) and Sonic Colors (2010). The team felt proud of their recreation of classic Sonic gameplay.

Sonic Mania features animated opening and ending sequences led by Tyson Hesse, one of the artists of the Sonic comics by Archie Comics. It also features an optional CRT graphical filter, and supports the enhanced features of both the PlayStation 4 Pro and Xbox One X, outputting at a native 4K resolution.

The soundtrack was composed by Tee Lopes of PagodaWest Games, consisting of rearranged pieces from previous Sonic games alongside new material. Lopes was chosen due to his popularity on YouTube for producing arrangements of various Sonic tracks, and for his work on the Sonic 2 HD project. Lopes initially wanted his score to resemble the Sonic CD soundtrack, trying to imagine what a sequel to it might have sounded like. As development progressed, he took inspiration from other older Sonic and Sega games, such as The Revenge of Shinobi (1989) and the Sega Rally games, and from 1990s popular music, such as the work of Michael Jackson. The reveal trailer theme, "Checkpoint", was composed by the electronic music groups Hyper Potions and Nitro Fun and the opening theme, "Friends", was composed by Hyper Potions.

== Release ==
Sonic Mania was announced alongside Sonic Forces at the 25th anniversary Sonic event at San Diego Comic-Con in July 2016. It was also featured at South by Southwest (SXSW), the Electronic Entertainment Expo (E3), and at SDCC in 2017, where attendees received a promotional instruction manual. Mania was announced for the second quarter of 2017, but Sega announced at SXSW that it had been delayed to allow for more development.

Sonic Mania was released digitally for the Nintendo Switch, PlayStation 4, and Xbox One on August 15, 2017. Four days before release, Sega delayed the Windows version by two weeks for further optimization, releasing it on August 29 as a download on Steam. As compensation, those who had pre-ordered it received a copy of the original Sonic the Hedgehog on Steam.

A Genesis-themed collector's edition was also released, containing a 12-inch (30 cm) Sonic statue atop a model Genesis, a game cartridge cast with a golden ring, and a metallic collector's card with a download code for the game. To promote the collector's edition, Sega released a retro-styled infomercial featuring former series art director Kazuyuki Hoshino and social media manager Aaron Webber, based on an American television commercial for Sonic The Hedgehog 2.

The music label Data Discs published the original Sonic Mania soundtrack on vinyl LP in late 2017. A soundtrack featuring selected tracks was released on digital music distribution platforms on January 17, 2018. In Japan, the physical release of Sonic Mania Plus included an expanded version of the soundtrack.

A five-part animated short mini-series, Sonic Mania Adventures, was released on the Sonic the Hedgehog YouTube channel between March and July 2018, promoting the release of Sonic Mania Plus. The series depicts Sonic's return to his world following the events of Sonic Forces, teaming up with his friends to prevent Eggman and Metal Sonic from collecting the Chaos Emeralds and Master Emerald. A holiday-themed bonus episode featuring Amy Rose (who did not appear as a playable character) was released in December 2018. The shorts were written and directed by Hesse, with animation production by Neko Productions, and music written by Lopes. All six shorts were later included as part of the Sonic Origins compilation in 2022.

=== Sonic Mania Plus ===
An expanded version, Sonic Mania Plus, was released in North America and Europe at retail and as downloadable content for the original version on July 17, 2018, and in Japan on July 19, 2018. A version for Amazon Luna was released on October 20, 2020. It adds playable characters Mighty the Armadillo and Ray the Flying Squirrel from the 1993 arcade game SegaSonic the Hedgehog, each with unique abilities: Mighty can slam the ground and is immune to spikes when in ball form, while Ray can glide without losing altitude. Plus also adds an "Encore Mode" with remixed levels and a reworked lives mechanic, a pinball bonus stage, and a four-player competition mode. Additionally, an update released alongside Sonic Mania Plus adds more cutscenes and a reworked Metal Sonic battle based on his appearance in Knuckles' Chaotix (1995). The physical version was released with a 32-page art book and a reversible cover in the style of Genesis or Mega Drive boxart covers, depending on the region. A soundtrack CD was included with the Japanese physical release.

In an interview with Famitsu, Iizuka explained that Sonic Mania was not intended to have a physical release; Sega staff requested one, but a retail version would have presented a challenge for the production schedule. After the launch, fans also expressed interest in a physical version. As a retail release would cost more than the downloadable version, the team added value with new content. Mighty and Ray were included because they were rarely featured in games; to accommodate them, level designs had to be altered. Additionally, the multiplayer mode was updated because of the increased number of selectable characters.

In 2023, Netflix announced that Sonic Mania Plus would be available for iOS and Android devices via the Netflix Games service in 2024. It was released on May 7, 2024. The ports were developed by Lab42, a developer owned by Sumo Digital, and published by Netflix.

== Reception ==
Reception

Aggregate scores
Aggregator	Score
Metacritic	NS: 86/100; PS4: 86/100; XONE: 83/100; PC: 84/100; Plus: NS: 91/100; PS4: 87/100; XONE: 89/100
OpenCritic	96% recommend

Review scores
Publication	Score
Destructoid	8/10
Electronic Gaming Monthly	9/10
Eurogamer	Essential
Game Informer	8.5/10
GameRevolution	4/5
GameSpot	9/10
IGN	8.7/10
Nintendo Life	9/10
Nintendo World Report	9/10
PC Gamer (UK)	82/100
Polygon	7/10
VideoGamer.com	7/10

Sonic Mania was announced following years of mixed reviews for the Sonic franchise. According to the International Business Times, the series had been "tarnished by years of sub-par games with only the occasional gem". The Business Times predicted that Sega's approach of releasing Sonic Forces and Sonic Mania in the same year, catering to new and old fans, could repair the series' reputation and lead to a "Sonic renaissance". Several critics expressed excitement for a return to the style of the early Sonic games, and wrote that Sega's previous efforts to develop games in the "classic" style, such as Sonic the Hedgehog 4 in 2010, had been disappointing.

According to the review aggregator site Metacritic, Sonic Mania received "generally favorable" reviews. It became the best-reviewed Sonic game in fifteen years, and several critics described it as one of the best 2D platform games. At launch, Sonic Mania was the bestselling Switch game, outselling Minecraft and Overcooked: Special Edition. It greatly increased Sega's third-quarter profits, and helped Sega almost double sales of packaged games compared to the same period in 2016. By April 2018, it had sold over one million copies worldwide across all platforms.

The presentation attracted acclaim. USGamer described it as the "pinnacle" of the series' pixel graphics. GameSpot called the animations and detail superior to the original games, writing that they added an extra layer of personality. Cubed3 described the levels as stylish and vibrant. Critics also praised the attention to detail in recreating the early games. Game Informer wrote that its gameplay was "nearly indistinguishable" from its Genesis predecessors, but with "extra polish". Easy Allies wrote that Mania emulated the original games "exceptionally", and that "running, jumping, and spin dashing all work exactly as well as you would hope". Nintendo World Report wrote that it avoided the physics problems from Sonic the Hedgehog 4 and recaptured the spirit of the 16-bit games.

The level design and music also received praise. Hardcore Gamer wrote that the remixed versions of older stages felt fresh while staying true to the originals. Game Informer wrote that the new stages matched the quality and captured the spirit of early Sonic games. The A.V. Club praised the detail and content in each level; Metro praised the fan service, and likened it to a school project "gone wild, something enthusiastic kids have made while the teacher was away and which far surpasses anything they were actually supposed to be doing". Like IGN, Venture Beat appreciated the replay value, with branching paths that made multiple playthroughs "fresh". EGM wrote that the soundtrack was "completely fantastic" and felt nostalgic and new at the same time. Nintendo Life called the soundtrack "one of the best of recent times".

Polygon said that frustrations with controls and enemy placement in the original Sonic games were present in Sonic Mania. VideoGamer.com wrote that it relied too much on nostalgia, with minimal innovation and too few original stages, but was a good proof of concept that the development team could expand upon. Nintendo World Report complained about the boss fights, which they felt were poorly executed and too easy. The Windows version was subject to review bombing due to its implementation of the digital rights management (DRM) software Denuvo, which some thought to be the real reason behind the two-week delay. Sonic Mania could not be played offline on launch day; Sega stated this was a bug unrelated to Denuvo, and released a patch the following day.

Multiple reviewers saw it as a return to form for the Sonic series after a number of poorly reviewed games after the 1990s. EGMNow commended Sonic Mania as one of the "purest and most enjoyable" Sonic games, expressing excitement for the future of the series. IGN wrote that it was the "classic" throwback that fans had clamored for since the 1990s, but also recommended it for people new to the franchise. Nintendo World Report called it a "must-buy" for fans of the older Sonic games. Waypoint compared it favorably to Donkey Kong Country Returns, describing it as a game that knew "what was fun" about its predecessors. Nintendo Life felt that Mania represented "a true return to form" and was a contender for the best game in the series.

Sonic Mania Plus received stronger reviews, with the Nintendo Switch version receiving "universal acclaim", according to the review aggregator Metacritic. Multiple reviewers called it the definitive version thanks to its extra game mode and characters. DualShockers' Tomas Franzese praised the "Encore" mode for feeling fresh, as well as the movement options introduced with Mighty and Ray. Michael Leri of Game Revolution, however, found the new partner system more frustrating than the traditional lives system found in classic Sonic games. IGN Spain did not recommend the update for those that own the original game, but commended the physical release and the added value for new players and hardcore fans.

=== Legacy ===
Sonic Mania was nominated for the "Best Family Game" at the Game Awards 2017 and the "Best Kids Game" at the 2018 New York Game Awards. The theme song "Friends" was reused for the prologue of the 2020 Sonic the Hedgehog film. Headcannon, a software development company, and other members of the team who had worked on Sonic Mania, were brought back in 2022 to work on Sonic Origins. Additionally, Retro Engine, the engine used for Sonic Mania, was used again for Sonic Origins and Sonic Origins Plus in 2022 and 2023 respectively.
