= Knuckles the Echidna =

Video game character

- Sonic the Hedgehog character
- Classic (left) and Modern (right) Knuckles designs
- First game: Sonic the Hedgehog 3 (1994)
- Created by: Takashi Yuda; Pamela Kelly
- Designed by: Takashi Yuda; Yuji Uekawa
- Voiced by: Japanese: Yasunori Matsumoto (1996 OVA); Nobutoshi Canna (1998–present); Subaru Kimura (live action franchise); English: Brian Drummond (Sonic Underground); Bill Wise (OVA); Michael McGaharn (1999); Ryan Drummond (2000); Scott Dreier (2001–2004); Dan Green (2003–2010); Travis Willingham (2010–2018); Dave B. Mitchell (2019–present); Idris Elba (live action franchise); Fred Tatasciore (2022; Sonic Drone Home); Adam Nurada (Sonic Prime); Vincent Tong (Sonic Prime; Shatterverse counterparts)

In-universe information
- Species: Short-beaked echidna
- Gender: Male
- Affiliation: Knuckles Clan
- Relatives: Tikal (ancestress); Pachacamac (ancestor)
- Origin: Angel Island

Knuckles the Echidna (Note: Japanese: ナックルズ・ザ・エキドゥナ, Hepburn: Nakkuruzu za Ekiduna) is a character from Sega's Sonic the Hedgehog series. He is an anthropomorphic red short-beaked echidna who is Sonic's secondary best friend and former rival. Determined and serious, but sometimes gullible, he fights his enemies using brute force and strength. His role is established as the guardian of the Master Emerald, a large gemstone which controls the series' integral Chaos Emeralds, and is the last living member of his tribe, the Knuckles Clan.

Knuckles debuted as one of the main antagonists in Sonic the Hedgehog 3 (1994); in Sonic & Knuckles, he first became a playable character. In the games' story, Doctor Eggman manipulates him into opposing Sonic and Tails. After antagonizing the duo, he forms a temporary alliance with them after learning of Eggman's trickery. Since then, he has appeared in numerous playable and non-playable roles, as well as in several series of comic books, Western animated television, and Japanese anime, in addition to the feature films Sonic the Hedgehog 2 and Sonic the Hedgehog 3, he stars in the live action Knuckles television miniseries.

One of the series' most popular characters, Knuckles has appeared in most games in the franchise, including those for the main series and spin-offs. His likeness has been frequently utilized in Sonic the Hedgehog merchandise, with the character also being subject to various Internet memes.

== Concept and creation ==
Multiple prototype designs of Knuckles the Echidna

During conception of Sonic the Hedgehog 3, the development team wanted to create a new rival for Sonic. The final design of Knuckles was the result of dozens of possible designs inspired by numerous different animals. In collaboration between the Sonic Team and Sega of America's product marketing manager, Pamela Kelly, the final character of "Knuckles" was chosen. The emphasis of the character was to break walls, with the original idea being a 'whirlwind' ability, rather than punching.

Knuckles was created by developer Takashi Yuda and Pamela Kelly who never intended him to be any more than a "supporting character". Knuckles was introduced in Sonic the Hedgehog 3 as an "intimidator" because of his powerful abilities and physical strength. He was given a headlining role in the next game, Sonic & Knuckles, where he made his first appearance as a playable character.

=== Voice portrayal ===
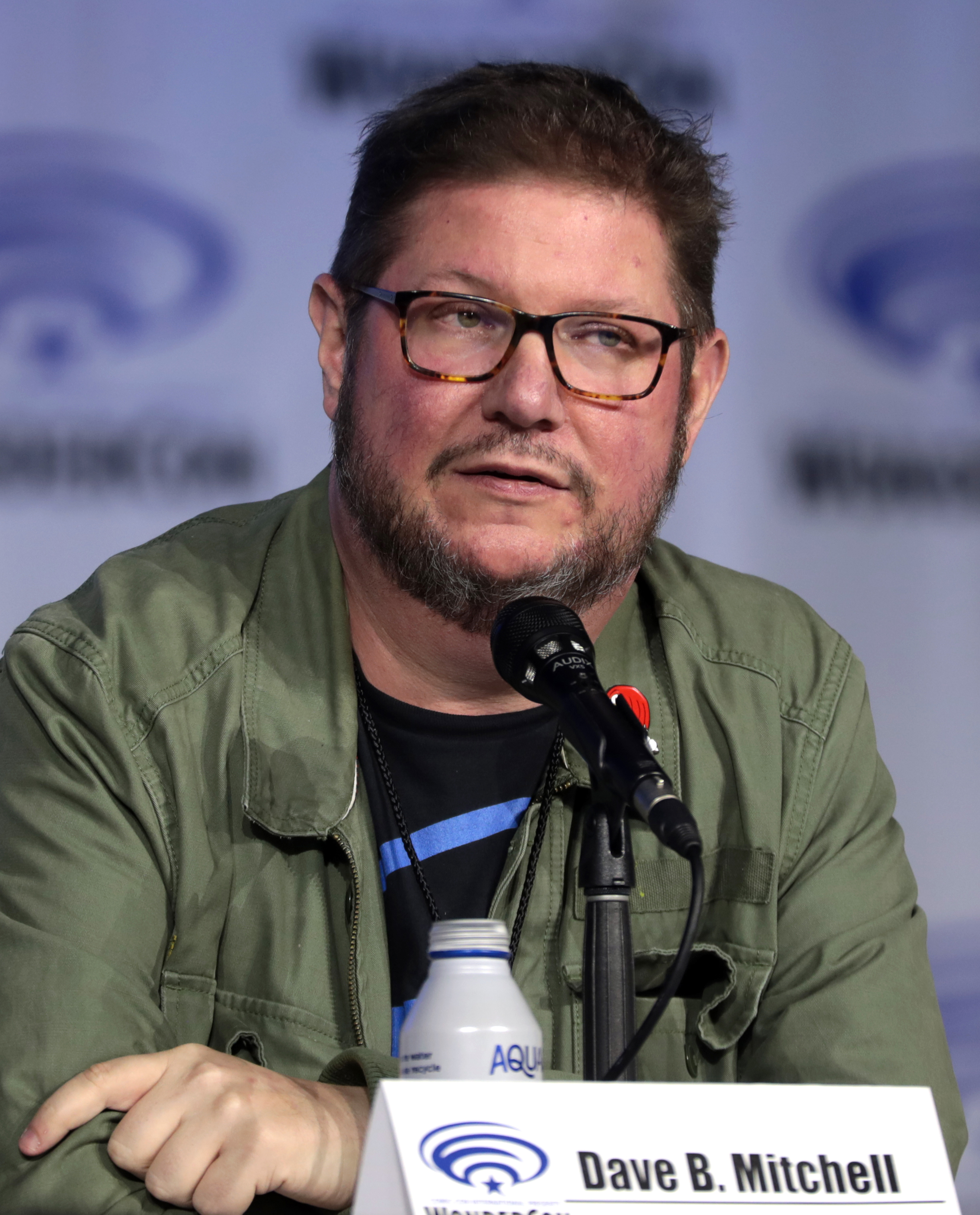
Actor Dave B. Mitchell (pictured in 2022) has been voicing Knuckles since 2019.

Knuckles has been voiced by several different actors over the years. In the Japanese dubs, he was voiced by Yasunori Matsumoto in Sonic the Hedgehog: The Movie and by Nobutoshi Canna since 1998, beginning with Sonic Adventure.

In animation, he was voiced by Brian Drummond in Sonic Underground and by Bill Wise in the English dub of Sonic the Hedgehog: The Movie.

In the video games, Knuckles was originally voiced by Michael McGaharn in Sonic Adventure, and then by Ryan Drummond in Sonic Shuffle. Scott Dreier began voicing the character in 2001, starting with Sonic Adventure 2. He continued to voice the character for three more years until 2004, his final role as Knuckles was in Sonic Advance 3. Dan Green began voicing the character in the anime series Sonic X, he would later take over the role in the video games in 2005, starting with Shadow the Hedgehog. In 2010, he was replaced by Travis Willingham, beginning with Sonic Free Riders. Willingham continued voicing the character until 2018, and his final role as Knuckles was in Super Smash Bros. Ultimate. Since 2019, Knuckles has been voiced by Dave B. Mitchell, beginning with Team Sonic Racing. In the live-action subfranchise, Knuckles is voiced by Idris Elba. In the 2022 Sonic short film, Sonic Drone Home, Knuckles is voiced by Fred Tatasciore. In the Netflix series Sonic Prime, Knuckles is voiced by Adam Nurada, while his Shatterverse counterparts (respectively named Renegade Knucks, Gnarly Knuckles, and Knuckles the Dread) are voiced by Vincent Tong.

== Characteristics ==
Knuckles is an anthropomorphic red short-beaked echidna, the only living descendant of a well-established clan of echidnas. For many years, his clan guarded a giant gemstone called the Master Emerald, which controls the Chaos Emeralds, objects central to the Sonic the Hedgehog game series. As such, Knuckles has spent most of his life atop a floating island called Angel Island, guarding the Master Emerald from harm. He has grown up fairly introverted as a result.

Knuckles has a personality described as cool. However, he sometimes loses his composure and gets in fights with other characters, and he can be shy around girls. His favorite food is grapes, and his relationship with Sonic is ambivalent. However, in later games, their relationship became more unequivocal: Knuckles entered the series as an antagonist of Sonic but later becomes one of the protagonists and sees him as a partner, while envying Sonic's adventurous lifestyle. He is depicted as somewhat gullible and very rash, especially when angered. Knuckles has often been tricked by Doctor Robotnik due to his naivety, but is stated in one game manual to have become more skeptical of him, possibly due to the multiple times of getting fooled by Robotnik.

While slower than Sonic, Knuckles is depicted as one of the series's strongest characters and a skilled martial artist: his brawny physique allows him to lift objects many times his size and weight, while his powerful fists enable him to smash boulders and break through solid ground. He can also glide long distances and climb up walls using the spikes of his gloves. Unlike Sonic, Knuckles is able to swim. As is typical among Sonic characters, Knuckles can roll into a ball to attack enemies. He also has an empowered "super" form: using the Chaos Emeralds allows him to transform into Super Knuckles. Using the Super Emeralds allows him to transform into Hyper Knuckles.

== Appearances ==
=== In video games ===
Knuckles debuted in the 1994 Sega Genesis game Sonic the Hedgehog 3. Knuckles joins the series's primary antagonist Dr. Robotnik after being tricked into thinking that Sonic is attempting to steal the Master Emerald; Knuckles fights Sonic at several points throughout the game. Robotnik's betrayal is revealed late in Sonic & Knuckles when he steals the Master Emerald and attacks Knuckles, Sonic & Knuckles is also the first game where he became a player character, his story takes place after Sonic's Story. A similar plot follows in Sonic the Hedgehog: Triple Trouble. While Knuckles's canonical playable debut comes in Sonic & Knuckles, he is playable in Sonic 2 and 3 via the Genesis' lock-on technology. Knuckles starred in Knuckles' Chaotix for the Sega 32X, in which he serves as the guardian of an island amusement park and rescues his friends—collectively known as the Chaotix—from Robotnik in 1995. He teams up with them individually, creating an unusual gameplay style involving two characters being tethered together.

Eggman shatters the Master Emerald, thus freeing Chaos who appears before Knuckles, the pieces are scattered around, and Chaos flees in Sonic Adventure. To restore the Emerald, thereby protecting Angel Island, he searches through various expansive levels for pieces. At one point, he defeats Chaos, and Eggman tricks Knuckles into thinking that Sonic is trying to collect Emerald shards for his own purposes. Knuckles finds Sonic holding two Chaos Emeralds he thinks are Master Emerald shards, and attacks him. This knocks them out of Sonic's hands, so Eggman shows up to steal them and leaves. He initially stays on Earth to look for pieces while Sonic and Tails follow Eggman, but later joins them aboard Eggman's airship, the Egg Carrier, after seeing a vision of there being more pieces on it. He finds the final pieces and is confronted by Chaos' final form, then returns to the Emerald's island to restore it.

Early in Sonic Adventure 2, Knuckles and Rouge argue over the Emerald; she wants the pieces for her personal collection. Eggman tries to steal it, so Knuckles shatters it aboard Eggman's hovercraft, sending the pieces every which way, while also mentioning that if the shards are found they can be made whole. He spends the game recollecting the pieces like in Adventure. He later helps Sonic, Tails, and Amy find Eggman's base inside a giant pyramid and a key to an inner chamber housing a giant Space Shuttle. He follows them to a giant space station called the ARK with it, where he again scuffles with Rouge over the Emerald. He saves her from falling into a constructed pit of lava; she decides the shards are worthless and dismissively lets him keep them, so he reassembles the Emerald and runs off. The antagonist Gerald Robotnik, Eggman's grandfather, initiates a program to send the ARK on a collision course with Earth as revenge for an attack on the ARK decades earlier, so Knuckles teams up with the other playable characters to reroute it.

Knuckles serves as a power-based character in Sonic Heroes alongside Sonic and Tails, who respectively represent speed and flight. They team up to defeat Eggman after receiving a letter saying that he will destroy the world in three days. However, it turns out that Eggman is being impersonated by Metal Sonic, whom all of the other characters defeat together. Knuckles helps Sonic, Tails, Amy Rose, and Cream the Rabbit stop Eggman from building an empire in the Sonic Advance trilogy. With the same team, Knuckles recurs in Sonic Riders and its two sequels; in each game, they participate in board-racing competitions together. In another team-based installment, the role-playing game Sonic Chronicles: The Dark Brotherhood, Knuckles is a playable character with a major role in the story. The game begins with Tails informing Sonic that Knuckles has been kidnapped, so a team beginning as Sonic, Tails, Amy, and Rouge must rescue him. He is eventually saved, and it is revealed that the echidna race is still alive in the form of the helpful Shade the Echidna and her villainous tribe, the Nocturnus.

He is a minor character in Sonic Rush, where he accosts Blaze the Cat under the impression that she has stolen Chaos Emeralds. In the Nintendo DS version of Sonic Colors, Knuckles arrives at an amusement park Eggman has created after receiving a letter. Frustrated at having been tricked, he challenges Sonic to a race as a mission, but shortly learns that Rouge wrote the letter inviting him to the park. He has a short argument with Rouge. Modern Knuckles gives Classic and Modern Sonic missions and helpful advice in Sonic Generations. In Sonic Lost World, Knuckles and Amy look after forest animals while Sonic and Tails rescue the animals' friends. Later, the Deadly Six take control of one of Eggman's machines to drain life from the world, and Amy and Knuckles die, but they are brought back to life when Sonic and Tails replenish it. He is a playable character in Sonic Mania Plus, regaining his role from the first games alongside Sonic, Tails, Mighty and Ray. He appears in the game Sonic Forces, where he becomes the leader of a resistance created to fight back against Eggman's advancing forces. In Sonic Frontiers, Knuckles inadvertently arrives on the Starfall Islands while investigating some ruins on Angel Island, once there he is captured by Sage. After Sonic releases his digital form who helps him search for the Chaos Emeralds, Knuckles notices that the ruins of Starfall Islands are similar to those on Angel Island, making him and Sonic wonder if the inhabitants of the islands resettled there after their arrival on the planet. After comparing the extinction of the Ancients and his own people reminds him that he is the last of his kind, Sonic encourages him to live his life to the fullest and not make the protection of the Master Emerald his sole purpose in life, with Knuckles deciding to heed his advice after he is free from Cyber Space.

Knuckles has been a playable character in numerous spinoff games with little effect on the series's plot, such as the fighting game Sonic the Fighters, the racing title Sonic R, and the party title Sonic Shuffle, as well as crossover games like Mario & Sonic at the Olympic Games and Sonic & All-Stars Racing Transformed. He makes a cameo appearance in Sega Superstars Tennis, as a member of the audience in the Green Hill court and in Super Smash Bros. Brawl's Green Hill stage, where he, Tails, and Silver run through the vertical loop in the background. Knuckles appears as one of four playable characters in the action-adventure spin-off property Sonic Boom (Rise of Lyric and Shattered Crystal). In Lego Dimensions, Knuckles appears as a non-playable character in the Sonic the Hedgehog world, in which he requests the player to assist him in a sidequest to take down some of Eggman's robots, during which he makes a number of references to the rap songs about him in the Sonic Adventure games. Knuckles also makes a cameo as an easter egg in Deus Ex: Mankind Divided on the box of a video game entitled Knuckles the Echidna in Knuckles & Knuckles & Knuckles which stems off of a running joke regarding the "& Knuckles" part of the title card when Sonic 3 is locked on to the Sonic and Knuckles cartridge. In Super Smash Bros. Ultimate, Knuckles appears as an assist trophy that attacks enemy players when summoned; he also appears as a spirit. He appears as a character cosmetic outfit in Fortnite Battle Royale.

Knuckles appears as an unlockable playable character in Super Monkey Ball Banana Rumble.

=== In comics ===
In Sonic the Comic, Knuckles plays a similar role to that of the games. When the Death Egg crashes on Angel Island, Knuckles is briefly tricked by Dr. Robotnik and thus allows Robotnik to place his robot armies on the island and construct a base to repair his Death Egg. Knuckles also assists him in fighting Sonic and stealing Sonic's own six Emeralds so they can be combined with Knuckles's into one set of Emeralds. However, Knuckles does not trust Robotnik enough to tell him that he possesses a seventh Emerald that can control the others, and when Robotnik tries to absorb the Emeralds' power into himself, Knuckles uses this Emerald to defeat him. From that point on, he works as an ally against Robotnik, starting by removing all traces of the doctor's influences from Angel Island.

In the comic series of Sonic the Hedgehog published by Archie Comics, Knuckles is the eighteenth guardian of the Floating Island, which is also called Angel Island. He is also a member of the Brotherhood of Guardians, a secret society that defends the island and is made up of Knuckles's predecessors/ancestors. In keeping with the incorporation of elements of the Sonic the Hedgehog cartoon into the series, Knuckles lives on the planet Mobius. Knuckles is supported in his efforts by the Chaotix, and often works together with Sonic the Hedgehog and the Freedom Fighters.

In the intercompany crossover miniseries DC X Sonic the Hedgehog, Knuckles is among Sonic's friends who join forces with the Justice League to stop Darkseid from conquering their universe with the Chaos Emeralds. Knuckles becomes mainly partnered with Superman.

=== In animation ===
Knuckles's animation debut came with the 1996 Japanese Sonic the Hedgehog OVA. Sonic and Tails meet him during their trip into the Land of Darkness, and over the course of the film he helps them defeat Black Eggman/Metal Robotnik and Hyper Metal Sonic, two robots created by Eggman/Robotnik. As Metal is about to descend into a lava pit, Sonic attempts to save him after all, but Knuckles holds him back and Sonic is disappointed. Knuckles play-fights with Sonic a few times in the film as well.

Knuckles is a minor character in Sonic Underground. Sonic, Sonia, and Manic meet Knuckles atop his home, the Floating Island, while searching for their mother. Knuckles is initially skeptical of them but soon accepts their help in protecting the Island and its guardian Chaos Emerald from villains Sleet and Dingo. Later on, the siblings recruit Knuckles to help them deactivate Doctor Robotnik's giant fortress, as it is powered by Emeralds and he can control them. They succeed, but Sleet and Dingo accidentally break the Emerald, unleashing gradually effective but massive energy upon the planet Mobius, and Knuckles enlists one of his relatives to help them control it, with mediocre results. Reluctantly, Knuckles cuts a deal with Robotnik to turn over the hedgehogs in exchange for setting Mobius right; Robotnik succeeds and starts turning the hedgehogs into robots, but Knuckles betrays Robotnik to rescue his friends.

Knuckles appears in all three seasons of Sonic X, where he is depicted as the guardian of the Master Emerald, and is said to have a "chip on his shoulder". The Sonic X version of Knuckles has been described as an "incredibly serious warrior with a deep, fleshed-out backstory" in comparison to the more comedic depictions of the character in recent years. After being stranded in the new world with Sonic, his only desire is to get back home quickly.

Knuckles is among the main cast in the Sonic Boom animated series, and had been redesigned for it: now being taller and more muscular than before. His Intelligence has regressed, as he become opposite of his original self.

Knuckles appears as a supporting character in Sonic Prime. After Sonic shatters the Paradox Prism, which results in the creation of multiple parallel dimensions at the expense of his own, multiple versions of Knuckles are made as well; such as Renegade Knucks who is a rebel against the Chaos Council of New Yoke City, the feral and paranoid Gnarly, and the pirate captain Knuckles the Dread. Knuckles is voiced by Adam Nurada and his variants are voiced by Vincent Tong.

=== In other media ===
While Knuckles does not appear in the Sonic series's first theatrical film, Sonic the Hedgehog, his existence is alluded to within the film's opening sequence in which a young Sonic and his caretaker Longclaw are attacked by a native clan of Echidnas.

Knuckles appears alongside Sonic and Tails in the second film, voiced by Idris Elba. In the film, it is revealed he is the last of the Echidna Tribe, as the rest of his kind became critically endangered and are in terminal decline due to a war between them and the giant owls, and has a grudge against Sonic for being Longclaw's apprentice. After being informed of Sonic's location by Dr. Robotnik, he teams up with the scientist and travels to Earth to defeat Sonic and seek out the Master Emerald to honor his ancestors. At the temple where the Emerald is located, Robotnik betrays Knuckles and leaves him to die, but he is rescued by Sonic. He teams up with Sonic and Tails to defeat Robotnik in Green Hills and reclaim the Master Emerald. The three agree to safeguard the Emerald as they live with Sonic's adoptive Earth family, the Wachowskis.

Knuckles is the titular primary protagonist of a spinoff miniseries of the same name released on Paramount+, with Elba reprising the role. In the miniseries, Knuckles (who is struggling to adjust to his new life and home on Earth) takes deputy sheriff Wade Whipple in as his "apprentice", training him in the ways of the Echidna warrior to help him prepare for a bowling tournament in Reno, Nevada where his estranged father will be competing. During their journey, Wade is reunited with his mother and sister, while Knuckles is pursued by "the Buyer", Dr. Robotnik's former operative who seeks to take Knuckles's power for himself.

Knuckles appears alongside Sonic and Tails in Sonic the Hedgehog 3, with Elba reprising the role, again. Knuckles continues to live with Sonic and Tails, with the Wachowskis, serving as the "muscle" of their team when they try to stop Shadow the Hedgehog. Knuckles continues to safeguard the Master Emerald with Wade's assistance until Sonic forces them to give him the Emerald, to use its powers to defeat Shadow. Knuckles continues to tend to go into confrontations eager to fight, or at least break something, but continues to remain loyal and even tries to give supportive advice to Sonic.

== Reception and impact ==
The character has received positive attention. According to IGN's Levi Buchanan, fans "seemed legitimately happy" with the addition of the character of Knuckles, who was popular enough to get marquee billing in Sonic & Knuckles, but Buchanan felt that characters who came after him were going "overboard". IGN's Colin Moriarty singled out the introduction of both Knuckles and Tails as when the series became "iffy" and listed them and all other characters in the series, sans Sonic and Robotnik, as being 2nd most in need to "die" on his top 10 list. In contrast, he was listed as the best Sonic character by Official Nintendo Magazine based on the impact he brought to the Sonic games in which he first appeared. Similarly, Complex writer Elijah Watson considers him a better character than Sonic. Watson praises his debut in Sonic the Hedgehog 3, and adds "Knuckles could have never been Sega's mascot; the echidna lacks the sociability of Sonic and his Nintendo counterpart, Mario. And yet this defining characteristic is what makes him so appealing. He is Sega's anti-hero: the dreadlocked brawler who is surprisingly selfless and has a soft spot for grapes and adorable animals."

In an official 2006 poll by Sonic Team, Knuckles was the fourth most popular character in the series, following behind Tails, Shadow, and Sonic. Knuckles was ranked fifth in a later 2025 popularity poll by Dengeki Online. Elton Jones from Complex listed Knuckles as his eleventh most wanted character in the next Super Smash Bros. game. Ravi Sinha of GamingBolt named Knuckles' appearance in Sonic Boom: Rise of Lyric as an entry on their "Worst Video Game Character Design", stating that "For as annoying as Sonic's rework was in Sonic Boom, Knuckles was way more baffling. Even worse is that his character is little more than a "dumb jock", with oddly intellectual viewpoints in the animated series because it's randomly funny or something."

Mega Zone's review of Knuckles' Chaotix praised the introduction of a new protagonist, whom it deemed "rougher and tougher" in comparison to the "spineless" Sonic. Mean Machines Sega called Knuckles's powers "impressive" and the character overall more useful and promising than Tails. Sega Magazine stated that Knuckles "looks cooler" than Sonic, comparing him to Spider-Man, and suggested he be given his own game. Sega Magazine later called him "groovy" and "ace", concluding that they "love him." Knuckles's characterization in Sonic Boom earned praise from Polygon due to how "progressive" he is when mentioning feminism much to the shock of the characters.

Kenneth Shepard from Kotaku felt Knuckles did not have enough screentime in his Paramount+ show, and observed "Elba is providing voice work for roughly 76 minutes and 47 seconds of a 172-minute-long season. Those are just scenes Knuckles is in, not accounting for whether or not he's actually contributing to the scene in a meaningful way." Rendy Jones at RogerEbert.com praised his characterization in the show, noting the character "diverting his muscle-head dim-witted traits into a confident and jovial guy with a heart of gold—an echidna himbo, if you will."

=== Ugandan Knuckles ===
This deformed version of Knuckles by YouTube user Gregzilla became the basis for "Ugandan Knuckles", which had a brief surge of popularity in early 2018.

In late December 2017, players began to flood the virtual reality video game VRChat with avatars depicting a deformed version of the character called "Ugandan Knuckles". The character stemmed from a 2017 review of Sonic Lost World by YouTube user Gregzilla as well as from fans of PlayerUnknown's Battlegrounds streamer Forsen who often make references to Uganda in the chat section of his streams. The character is often associated with quotes such as "Do you know da wae?" and "Save the queen!" among many other quotes, which originate from the 2010 Ugandan action comedy film Who Killed Captain Alex? as well as for "spitting" on other users whom they feel do not know "da wae".

The meme was criticized by some journalists as being racially insensitive; Polygon described it as "problematic". The creator of the avatar, DeviantArt user "tidiestflyer", has expressed regret over how it has been used, in particular saying that he hopes it is not used to annoy players of VRChat, and that he enjoys the game and he does not want to see anyone's rights get taken away because of the avatar. In response, in January 2018 the developers of VRChat published an open letter on Medium, stating that they were developing "new systems to allow the community to better self-moderate" and asking users to use the built-in muting features.

In April 2019, Canadian toy company Youtooz launched their line of vinyl collectible figurines with a depiction of Ugandan Knuckles.

=== ...& Knuckles ===
Another Knuckles-centric meme is derived from the video game Sonic 3 & Knuckles, a game which combined Sonic the Hedgehog 3 and Sonic & Knuckles, accessed by attaching the cartridge of the former to the latter. The awkward-sounding combination of names resulted in a meme where a fictitious and absurdly long video game name is created (usually one for a long-running franchise) with "& Knuckles" appended to the end of it. This meme was also used to poke fun at the Nintendo DS and Nintendo 3DS series of systems due to the large number of variants, with & Knuckles often appended to the end of an invented system, e.g. "New Nintendo 3DSi XL & Knuckles". This was later referenced in Sonic Mania, which featured an unlockable "& Knuckles" mode, allowing a computer-controlled Knuckles to follow the player's character, even if Knuckles is also chosen as the playable character.

== See also ==
- List of Sonic the Hedgehog characters
