= Unreleased Sonic the Hedgehog games =

Unreleased video games

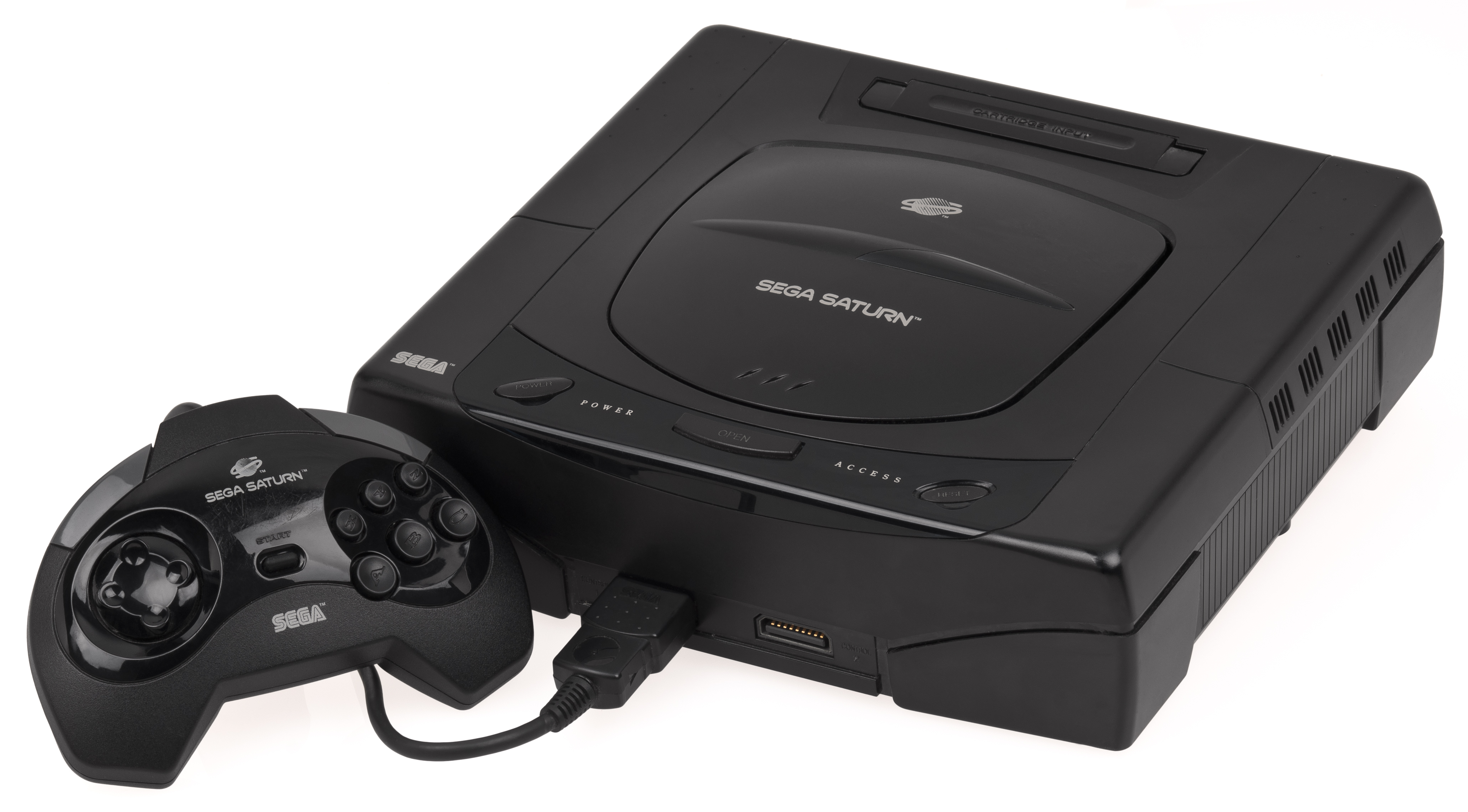
The cancellation of Sonic X-treme, developed by Sega Technical Institute between 1994 and 1996, is considered an important factor in the commercial failure of the Sega Saturn (pictured).

Sonic the Hedgehog is a video game series and media franchise created and published by the Japanese company Sega. Since the release of the original Sonic the Hedgehog for the Sega Genesis in 1991, several Sonic games have been canceled or reworked into other projects. Builds of unreleased Sonic games have leaked online, and some introduced concepts that were reincorporated in released games.

Early in Sonic's history, two spin-off games—the edutainment game Sonic's Edusoft and the falling block puzzle game SegaSonic Bros.—were completed, but Sega declined to publish them. Sega and Nihon Falcom planned to remake Falcom's PC-8801 game Popful Mail (1991) for the Sega CD as a Sonic game, but canceled it in favor of a more faithful remake after a negative fan response. Unreleased Genesis Sonic games include three spin-offs pitched by Sega Technical Institute (STI) and Sonic Crackers, which was reworked into the 32X game Knuckles' Chaotix (1995).

STI began working on Sonic X-treme, planned as the first Sonic 3D platformer and the first Sonic game for the Sega Saturn, after the release of Sonic & Knuckles (1994). Development was hindered by company politics, problems adapting Sonic to 3D, and crunch. After two lead developers became ill, Sega canceled X-treme and released a Saturn port of the Genesis game Sonic 3D Blast (1996) in its place. The cancellation is considered an important factor in the Saturn's commercial failure, as it left the console with no original Sonic platform game.

After Sega exited the video game console market to become a third-party developer, plans to develop a sequel to Sonic Adventure 2 (2001) were canceled twice, first in favor of Sonic Heroes (2003) and later in favor of Sonic Unleashed (2008). Other unreleased Sonic games include the skateboarding game Sonic Extreme, which may have served as the basis for Sonic Riders (2006), and proposed follow-ups to Sonic Chronicles: The Dark Brotherhood (2008), Sonic the Hedgehog 4: Episode II (2012), and Sonic Mania (2017).

== Early projects ==
=== Sonic's Edusoft ===
Sonic's Edusoft, the first game in Sega's Sonic the Hedgehog franchise developed outside Japan, was developed by the British studio Tiertex Design Studios for the Master System in 1991. The edutainment game comprised minigames that players accessed from an isometric hub world. The minigames included math and spelling questions; three were non-educational. Edusoft was virtually finished and Tiertex conducted focus testing at a Didsbury school. It would have been published by U.S. Gold, but Sega was uninterested in licensing the project.

Information about Edusoft surfaced when one of its programmers wrote a Wikipedia page about it. The page was deleted after editors deemed it a hoax, so he emailed screenshots to Sonic fansites, but the online Sonic community also deemed it a hoax. By 2010, the ROM image had leaked online and its authenticity was verified.

=== Home computer game ===
During the development of Sonic the Hedgehog (1991) for the Sega Genesis, U.S. Gold acquired the license to develop versions for home computers, including the Amiga, Amstrad CPC, Atari ST, Commodore 64, and ZX Spectrum. The computer versions were planned for release in 1992, but Sega revoked the license following Sonic the Hedgehog's success to keep the franchise exclusive to its platforms. The Italian magazine The Games Machine published screenshots purportedly from the Amiga version alongside its review of Sonic the Hedgehog, though Games That Weren't wrote they appeared to have been mockups created in Deluxe Paint.

=== SegaSonic Bros. ===
SegaSonic Bros. was part of a series of arcade games that Sega commissioned after the success of Sonic the Hedgehog. It was a falling block puzzle game designed by the Taito alumnus Fukio Mitsuji, who created the Bubble Bobble series, and featured multicolored Sonics as the blocks. It ran on the Sega System C2, an arcade board based on the Genesis hardware. Although SegaSonic Bros. was complete, Sega decided against a wide release after it performed poorly in late 1992 location tests. Some of its music was recycled in later projects; Sega rearranged the main theme for the Sega CD port of Teddy Boy Blues (1985) and reused one of the gameplay tracks as the special stage theme in Sonic the Hedgehog 3 (1994).

SegaSonic Bros. was considered lost for many years, but a working board was discovered in 2016 and the ROM image was leaked in 2018. Reviewing the leaked ROM, Hardcore Gaming 101 wrote that it was "easy to see why" SegaSonic Bros. was canceled, with complicated rules, needlessly difficult gameplay, and jumbled, cheap-looking visuals. They felt that falling-block puzzle games such as Taito's Cleopatra Fortune (1996) better executed its design elements.

=== Console ports ===
Sega planned to port Sonic the Hedgehog and Sonic the Hedgehog 2 (1992) to the Sega CD, a CD-based add-on for the Genesis. Sega showcased the Sonic the Hedgehog port at Summer CES in 1992. The ports were canceled in favor of an original game, Sonic CD (1993). A Master System port of the Game Gear game Sonic the Hedgehog: Triple Trouble (1994) was also planned, but it ultimately remained a Game Gear exclusive.

=== Sister Sonic ===
Sister Sonic was a remake of Popful Mail (1991), an action role-playing game developed by Nihon Falcom for the PC-8801. It was developed for the Sega CD by Sega Falcom, a joint venture between Sega and Nihon Falcom. Sister Sonic replaced Popful Mail's characters with those from the Sonic franchise, with the protagonist, Mail, recast as Sonic's female relative. It would have been the first Sonic role-playing video game, predating Sonic Chronicles: The Dark Brotherhood (2008).

Sega Falcom's director, Kazutaka Yano, announced Sister Sonic in the November 1992 issue of the Japanese magazine Beep, Beep! MegaDrive. In response, Popful Mail fans launched a letter-writing campaign urging Sega to remove the Sonic connections in favor of a more faithful remake. By November 1993, Sega had decided to release the game as Popful Mail in Japan and turn Sister Sonic into its Western localization. For unknown reasons, this did not come to fruition, and Working Designs released a faithful localization of Popful Mail in the US in 1995.

== Sega Genesis ==
=== Treasure Tails ===
In February 1993, Sega Technical Institute (STI) pitched the spin-off Treasure Tails, an isometric puzzle-platform game for the Genesis that starred Sonic's sidekick Miles "Tails" Prower. In 2020, the STI artist Craig Stitt shared mockup screenshots he created for the pitch on Facebook after discovering them in a 1995 video resume.

=== Astropede ===
Stitt pitched Astropede, a spin-off starring a caterpillar-like character, that Sega of America executives approved. He worked with another developer, Ken Rose, to create a playable build for the Genesis that reused graphics from a deleted Sonic 2 level, but development never progressed further. Gameplay footage surfaced in 2020.

=== Sonic-16 ===
Roger Hector, the head of STI, wanted to develop a game based on the Saturday morning Sonic the Hedgehog cartoon (1993–1994), and took STI developers to DiC Animation's studios in Burbank, California after the release of Sonic Spinball (1993) to demonstrate his idea. The STI developer Peter Morawiec began designing Sonic-16, a side-scrolling video game for the Genesis with more focus on story than previous Sonic games. Morawiec and STI's art director, John Duggan, created a demo in under a week using Brilliance software. The demo featured slow gameplay due to the difficulty of animating fast backgrounds with Brilliance, though Morawiec planned to include speed-based sequences.

Sega management was not interested in a spin-off and felt the idea was too slow for Sonic, and Sonic's co-creator Yuji Naka disliked its design, so Morawiec worked on Comix Zone (1995) instead. In 2007, Morawiec said that canceling Sonic-16 "was probably the right decision", as the Sonic franchise was still in its infancy and would have been harmed by too many spin-offs. He noted the Sonic cartoon had not even aired yet when Sonic-16 was pitched. Some gameplay elements later surfaced in Sonic X-treme.

=== Sonic Crackers / Sonic Stadium ===
Sonic Crackers (top) was reworked into the 1995 game Knuckles' Chaotix (bottom).

Sonic Crackers, also known as Sonic Stadium (the title on the ROM image header), was a platform game for the Genesis developed by a Japanese Sega team in 1994. It was intended as the last Genesis Sonic game and to succeed Sonic & Knuckles (1994). Most of the team had never worked on a Sonic game before, aside from a producer and some artists who contributed to Sonic CD. The name likely comes from clackers, a toy comprising two balls connected by string. Sega presented Crackers to video game journalists in secret showings, but canceled and reworked it into Knuckles' Chaotix (1995), a spin-off starring Knuckles the Echidna for the 32X add-on.

A ROM image, compiled at some time in 1994, (Note: The exact date the ROM was compiled is unclear. The date "19940401"—which could be read as January 4, 1994, or April 1, 1994—appears on the title screen, while the ROM header lists the date as July 1994.) was leaked online by a Belgian hacking group in June 1995. It features Sonic and Tails joined by an elastic band of energy and is split between two side-scrolling and two isometric top-down levels. The levels appear to be early versions of two Chaotix areas. Kotaku and Retro Gamer described Crackers as a proof-of-concept or game engine test, as it features broken collision, unpolished physics, and no enemies. According to the author Ken Horowitz, Sega canceled Crackers in response to a downturn in the 16-bit market as next-generation hardware was approaching.

By December 1994, Crackers had been reworked into Chaotix, which retains the tethering mechanic, music, and some visual elements but removes Sonic and Tails, the top-down levels, and the art. Horowitz wrote that the top-down levels instead served as the basis for Sonic 3D Blast (1996). Some fans speculated that the Crackers ROM was an April Fools' Day hoax due to one reading of its build date, but its authenticity was corroborated by references in an internal Sega design document, leftover sprites in a prototype build of Yu Yu Hakusho Makyō Tōitsusen (1994), and text found in a leaked Knuckles' Chaotix prototype. A cartridge version was auctioned for $146.50 in 2001.

== Sega Saturn and Dreamcast ==
=== Sonic X-treme ===
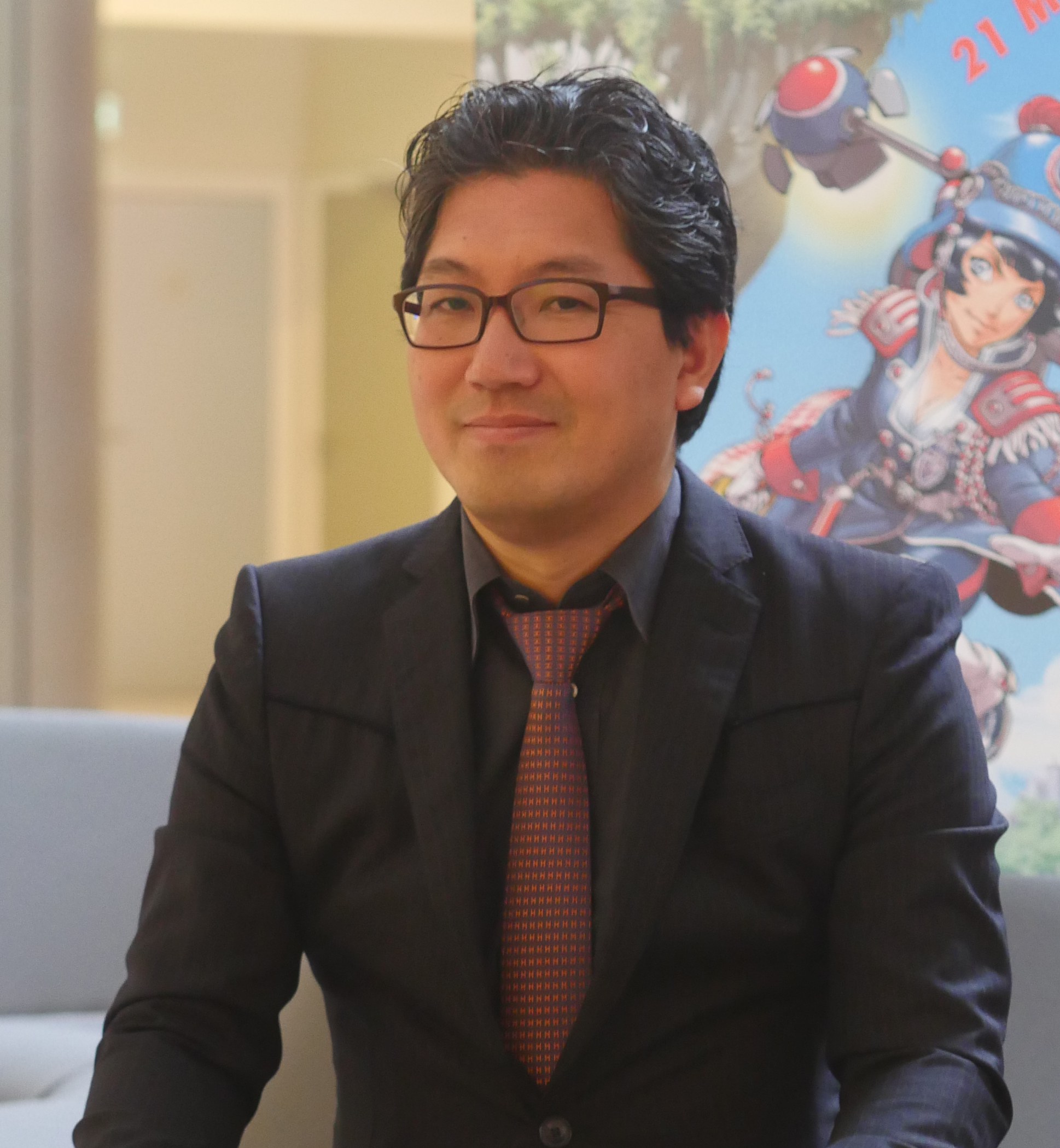
Sonic's co-creator Yuji Naka (pictured in 2015) was reportedly instrumental in the cancellation of several Sonic games, including Sonic X-treme.

Described by Nintendo Life as "arguably the most famous unreleased Sonic game", Sonic X-treme was developed by STI from 1994 until its cancellation in 1996. It would have been the first Sonic 3D platformer, predating the Dreamcast game Sonic Adventure (1998), and the first Sonic game for the Sega Saturn. The story went through several iterations; the one described in promotional materials involved Tiara Boobowski and her father, Professor Gazebo Boobowski, calling on Sonic to help defend the six magical Rings of Order from Doctor Eggman. X-treme featured a fisheye camera system and levels that rotated around a fixed center of gravity, meaning Sonic could run up walls and arrive at what was previously the ceiling. Like previous Sonic games, X-treme emphasized speed and physics, and featured special stages and collectible rings.

STI began developing X-treme as a side-scrolling Genesis game to succeed Sonic & Knuckles. They shifted to the 32X and then the Saturn and Windows, and the game was scheduled to be released during the 1996 holiday shopping season. Development was hindered by disputes between Sega of America and Japan, Naka's reported refusal to let STI use development tools from Sonic Team's game Nights into Dreams (1996), and problems adapting Sonic to 3D. The developers worked under crunch conditions, to the point that one programmer moved into STI's offices to work 20-hour days. By August 1996, two lead developers became severely ill, making meeting the deadline impossible, and the producer Mike Wallis canceled X-treme. In its place, Sega released a Saturn port of the Genesis game Sonic 3D Blast as the holiday Sonic game. A Saturn test build leaked in 2007, gameplay footage surfaced in 2008, and playable builds for the Saturn and Windows leaked in 2015.

X-treme's cancellation is considered an important factor in the Saturn's commercial failure, as it left the console with no original Sonic platform game. Journalists and fans have speculated about its potential; Wallis believed it "definitely would have been competitive" with the rival Mario franchise's first 3D game, Super Mario 64 (1996). Some X-treme elements appeared in later games. Sonic's model was reused in the edutainment game Sonic's Schoolhouse (1996), while one of the proposed storylines featured the character Chaos, who appeared as an antagonist in Sonic Adventure. Sonic Lost World (2013) features similar level design and gameplay elements. Siliconera asked Sonic Team's head, Takashi Iizuka, if the similarities were intentional; he replied that they were coincidental and that he was the only Lost World staffer aware of X-treme's existence.

=== Sonic Saturn ===
In addition to Sonic X-treme, STI worked on another Sonic game for the Saturn, known as Sonic Saturn. At the request of Hector and Sega of America's vice president Shinobu Toyoda, Morawiec, Adrian Stephens, and Howard Drossin—who had worked together on Comix Zone—established an STI office in Burbank to develop the game. The special stages would have featured Sonic rolling on a billiard table to collect the Chaos Emeralds. While Morawiec felt their concepts and technology were interesting, Naka rejected them and the project was canceled. STI attempted to rework the special stages into the Saturn version of 3D Blast, but Sega opted to remake Sonic 2's special stages in 3D.

=== Sonic Adventure 3 ===
Sonic Adventure 3 was in preproduction for the Dreamcast by January 31, 2001, when Sega announced it was discontinuing the Dreamcast to become a third-party developer. After the release of Sonic Adventure 2 (2001), Iizuka chose to develop a standalone game, Sonic Heroes (2003), to appeal to the broader multiplatform audience, as he worried that Adventure 3 would only appeal to Sonic fans. Sonic Team returned to Adventure 3 after the critical failure of Sonic the Hedgehog (2006), but as development progressed, they replaced the Adventure format of multiple playable characters with a new approach by which Sonic becomes a werewolf-like beast. The director, Yoshihisa Hashimoto, changed the title to Sonic Unleashed (2008), removing its connections to the Adventure games.

In 2017, Iizuka said Sonic Team was uninterested in developing Adventure 3, as they felt it would not advance Sonic's design. He said: "If we can get the gameplay to evolve and get to a place where Adventure 3 makes sense, then you might see an Adventure 3 come out. But we don't want to take the entire series back to where it was just to make people happy." In 2024, Iizuka said that while Sonic Team had no plans for Adventure 3, they would "love to make it".

== Third-party console games ==
=== Sonic Extreme ===
After they produced cutscenes for Sonic Heroes, the San Diego-based studio Vision Scape Interactive pitched Sonic Extreme, a skateboarding game for the GameCube, PlayStation 2, and Xbox similar to the Tony Hawk's Pro Skater series. Their tech demo featured Sonic and Shadow riding hoverboards in a Green Hill Zone-themed environment with single-player and multiplayer modes. Naka was interested and requested a software design description and estimated budget. Vision Scape supplied them, but Sega ceased communications afterward.

Extreme may have served as the basis for Sonic Team's Sonic Riders (2006), a racing game that features similar gameplay concepts such as hoverboards. Vision Scape's head felt that Riders was clearly based on Extreme and considered taking legal action, but discovered that the non-disclosure agreement Vision Scape signed during the Sonic Heroes development gave Sega ownership of anything they made using a Sega property. The Extreme tech demo was discovered on an Xbox development kit and leaked in 2011.

=== Ports ===
Sega canceled ports of Sonic the Hedgehog (2006), Sonic Generations (2011), and Sonic the Hedgehog 4: Episode II (2012) for Nintendo's Wii. Sonic the Hedgehog would have required a lengthy porting process, so Sonic Team opted to make a separate game, Sonic and the Secret Rings (2007), that could be released close to the Wii's launch window. Sonic Team abandoned development on the Wii version of Generations due to the console's limited graphical capabilities, and developed a Nintendo 3DS version for Nintendo audiences instead. While Sonic 4: Episode I (2010) was released as a downloadable WiiWare game, Episode II's switch from pre-rendered to real-time 3D graphics made its file size too large for distribution.

Sega advertised versions of Sonic the Hedgehog for Windows and Sonic 4: Episode II for Windows Phone, but neither was released. Episode II was set to be the first Windows Phone game to feature cross-platform play with its Xbox 360 counterpart, with cloud saving via Xbox Live.

=== Sonic Storybook game ===
In June 2011, a Sega representative said that a third game in the Wii-exclusive Sonic Storybook series, succeeding Sonic and the Secret Rings and Sonic and the Black Knight (2009), was in development. Sega had previously held a Facebook poll asking players what theme, such as Greek mythology or film noir, that they preferred for a third Storybook game, though the community manager Kevin Eva clarified the poll was not indicative of future plans. A third game was never released; in 2026, Game Informer wrote that Sega had abandoned the Storybook brand.

=== Sonic the Hedgehog 4: Episode III ===
Sonic the Hedgehog 4 was planned as a trilogy of episodic games. Sega released Episode I and Episode II, developed by Sonic Team and Dimps, via digital distribution platforms between 2010 and 2012. Before Episode I's release, Sega confirmed plans for a third episode, and before Episode II's release, Iizuka said that he did not expect a long wait for Episode III. VG247 reported that Sega was expected to bundle the Sonic 4 episodes on a retail disc after the last episode's release.

In March 2012, Iizuka announced that Sonic Team had canceled Episode III. In 2015, the Australian developer Christian "Taxman" Whitehead, who developed remakes of Sonic CD, Sonic the Hedgehog, and Sonic 2 and later led the development of Sonic Mania (2017), said Sega asked him about developing Episode III with Sega Studios Australia, but the division was shut down and he instead worked on the Sonic remakes between 2012 and 2013. He surmised that the Episode III plans "fizzled out" as the circumstances regarding Sega of America, Sega Networks, and free-to-play games changed.

In April 2025, an unused Episode II ending cutscene surfaced online; it depicts the Master Emerald rebooting the Death Egg after Sonic and Tails disable it during Episode II's conclusion and features a cameo from Knuckles. ComicBook.com wrote that the cutscene suggests Episode III would have featured Eggman tricking Knuckles into helping him.

=== Evening Star game ===
After the release of Sonic Mania, Sonic Team and the Mania developers led by Whitehead, who formed Evening Star Studio in 2018, began discussing another collaboration. They did not want to make a Mania sequel since Iizuka felt casual audiences would dismiss it as a rehash. Evening Star created a 2.5D prototype that experimented with depth using its in-development Star Engine. Sonic Team and Evening Star decided against developing the prototype into a full game, and Evening Star moved on to develop Penny's Big Breakaway (2024). Whitehead denied rumors that the decision was caused by creative differences and said that Evening Star's relationship with Sega remained friendly. Many of the ideas Iizuka had discussed with Whitehead influenced those he developed with Naoto Ohshima for Sonic Superstars (2023), in which Evening Star received a "special thanks" credit. Whitehead and the composer Tee Lopes shared screenshots and music from the prototype in 2025.

== Third-party handheld games ==
=== Sonic E3 Demo / Sonic DS ===
Sonic E3 Demo, also known as Sonic DS, was a demo that Sega showcased during the Nintendo DS's reveal at E3 2004. It featured simple 3D gameplay in which players made Sonic sprint by rubbing the DS's touchscreen to reach a finish line. Frank Cifaldi, writing for UGO, said it was unclear if it was planned as a full game or merely a tech demo. The demo was not developed further, and Sega announced Sonic Rush (2005) as the first Sonic game for the DS at E3 2005.

=== Sonic X Volume 2 ===
In 2004, Majesco launched Game Boy Advance Video, a line of Game Boy Advance cartridges containing viewable episodes of different animated series. The anime Sonic X was among the shows licensed for distribution, and a cartridge containing the first two episodes, "Chaos Control Freaks" and "Sonic to the Rescue", was one of the first GBA Video releases. A second volume containing episodes 3 and 4, "Missile Wrist Rampage" and "Chaos Emerald Chaos", was announced but never materialized.

=== Sonic Riders for Game Boy Advance ===
As Sonic Team developed Sonic Riders for consoles, Backbone Entertainment worked on a Game Boy Advance version that featured gameplay similar to Sega's arcade game Out Run (1986). Sega of America canceled it after 3D elements requested by Japanese management could not be accomplished within the production schedule.

=== Sonic Chronicles 2 ===
BioWare's Nintendo DS role-playing game Sonic Chronicles: The Dark Brotherhood ends on a cliffhanger in which Sonic and his friends return from an alternate dimension to discover that Eggman has taken over the world. BioWare planned a sequel in which the Sonic characters assembled an army and Sonic and Eggman were forced to collaborate to confront a god, Argus, mentioned in The Dark Brotherhood. BioWare drew inspiration from the films Back to the Future Part II (1989) and Terminator 2: Judgment Day (1991). Sonic Chronicles 2 was canceled due to factors including Electronic Arts' (EA) acquisition of BioWare and claims by Ken Penders that The Dark Brotherhood's characters were derivative of those he created for Archie Comics' Sonic comic books. Penders sued Sega and EA for copyright infringement twice. While both lawsuits were unsuccessful, Sega has not used characters from The Dark Brotherhood since, which Intelligencer wrote was likely due to the threat of another lawsuit.

=== Sonic Generations for PlayStation Portable ===
In 2017, a group of fans discovered a disc containing an unreleased PlayStation Portable (PSP) version of Sonic Generations, developed in November 2009. The disc was damaged but somewhat functional. The fans recovered assets including an early logo, button prompts, a debug menu, and a level screenshot; the recoveries suggested that the PSP version of Generations was identical to the 3DS version. They shared their discoveries in 2021. TheGamer suggested that Sega canceled the PSP version due to the impending launch of the PlayStation Vita.

=== Sonic the Hedgehog 3 & Knuckles for Android and iOS ===
After developing the 2013 remakes of Sonic the Hedgehog and Sonic 2 for Android and iOS devices, Whitehead and his collaborator Simon Thomley pitched a similar remake of Sonic the Hedgehog 3 & Knuckles (1994). They developed a demo featuring the first level and four special stages in widescreen. Thomley expressed interest in expanding Sonic 3's small multiplayer levels and adding online multiplayer, time attack, and boss rush modes.

Whitehead and Thomley released footage of the pitch in October 2014 to coincide with the 20th anniversary of Sonic & Knuckles. Unlike the previous remakes, Sega rejected the pitch, despite interest from fans. VG247 wrote the rejection was likely due to legal problems stemming from Michael Jackson's involvement with the Sonic 3 soundtrack. Thomley and his studio, Headcannon, were later contracted to develop a Sonic 3 & Knuckles remake for consoles, which Sega incorporated in the compilation Sonic Origins (2022). It replaces the music in several Sonic 3 levels to sidestep legal problems.

=== Nitrome game ===
Nitrome, which developed games such as Leap Day (2016), Bomb Chicken (2020), and Shovel Knight Dig (2022), pitched a Leap Day-style Sonic mobile game, but Sega rejected it. The game, controlled with one button, was a platformer that emphasized vertical movement and wall running, which Nitrome reused in their Apple Arcade game Super Leap Day (2021). They shared footage of the pitch in 2021 and said they were still interested in developing it if Sega reconsidered.
