= Breaking the Ice =

Breaking the Ice may refer to:

- Breaking the Ice (film), 1938 American film by Edward F. Cline
- "Breaking the Ice" (Frasier), a 1995 television episode
- "Breaking the Ice" (Lucky Feller), a 1976 television episode
- "Breaking the Ice" (Star Trek: Enterprise), a 2001 television episode
- Breaking the Ice (organization), a peace project founded by Heskel Nathaniel
- Breaking the Ice (role-playing game), a 2005 dating game by Emily Care Boss
- "Stanley and Stella in: Breaking the Ice", an animated short film

== See also ==
- Break the Ice (disambiguation)
- Don't Break the Ice, a strategy game by Milton Bradley
- Icebreaker (disambiguation)
