= Icebreaker (disambiguation) =

An icebreaker is a ship designed to move through ice-covered waters.

Icebreaker(s) or Ice Breaker(s) may also refer to:

== Film and television ==
- Icebreaker (film), 2000 U.S.-American action film
- The Icebreaker (film), 2016 Russian disaster film
- "Ice Breaker", 2004 television episode, see list of The Crocodile Hunter episodes
- "Icebreaker", 1987 television episode, see list of Sledge Hammer! episodes
- Ice Breaker, 2005 documentary film about the Canadian icebreaker CCGS Henry Larsen

== Literature ==
- Icebreaker (novel), a 1983 James Bond novel by John Gardner
- Icebreaker (non-fiction book), a 1987 military history book by Victor Suvorov
- Icebreaker, an autobiography by Rudy Galindo with Eric Marcus
- Icebreaker, the 2013 first novel in the Hidden series by Lian Tanner
- ICEBreaker, in cyberpunk literature, software designed to break through Intrusion Countermeasures Electronics

== Music ==
- Icebreaker (band), a UK new music ensemble
- The Icebreaker, a 1998 EP by Cursive, or the title song, "Icebreakers"
- "Icebreaker" (song), a 2016 song by Agnete Johnsen
- "Icebreaker", a 2019 song by Tanya Tagaq on the EP Toothsayer

== Sports ==
- Icebreakers (ice hockey team), a charity hockey team of Swedish NHL players
- Chesapeake Icebreakers, a defunct American minor-league hockey team
- Ice Breaker Road Race, an annual foot race in Great Falls, Montana, US
- Ice Breaker Tournament, an annual American college ice hockey event

== Video games ==
- Icebreaker (video game), a 1995 strategy/action game
- Ice Breaker (video game), a 2009 computer puzzle game
- Icebreaker: A Viking Voyage, a 2013 IOS version of the 2009 game

== Other uses ==
- Icebreaker (clothing), a New Zealand clothing brand
- Icebreaker (facilitation), a social activity
- Ice Breaker (missile), an Israeli air-launched cruise missile
- Ice Breaker (roller coaster), a roller coaster at SeaWorld Orlando, Florida, US
- Ice Breakers candy, a brand of mints and chewing gum
- Icebreaker Glacier, Antarctica

== See also ==
- Eisbrecher, a German dance-metal band
- Break the Ice (disambiguation)
- Breaking the Ice (disambiguation)
