= Platform Panic =

2014 mobile video game

- Developer: Nitrome
- Publisher: Nitrome
- Platforms: iOS, Android
- Release: December 17, 2014
- Genre: Platform

Platform Panic is a platform game for iOS and Android. It was developed and published by British studio Nitrome and was released on December 17, 2014. The goal is to navigate throughout the levels, avoiding the various enemies and spikes. The game is inspired by platform games from the fourth generation of video game consoles. The game received generally positive reviews and reactions from critics.

== Development ==
An indie game, Platform Panic was published by the developer Nitrome. Its release date was December 17, 2014. The game was created for both the iOS and Android operating systems. On January 28, 2015, the game received a major update. The update added character upgrades and special abilities for each one of them. Prior to this update, characters were merely cosmetic and had no effect on gameplay.

== Gameplay ==
Each game in Platform Panic begins with a robot dropping the player's chosen character into the level. Once the game starts, the player's task is to avoid the enemies and other obstacles, whilst leaping from platform to platform. Coins can also be collected during gameplay, and these can be used to purchase new characters, and to upgrade existing ones. The character is controlled by using simple touch screen controls; the player never stops moving, and the only way to change its path is by swiping up on the screen to make it jump.

In every playthrough of the game, there are multiple rooms which can be explored. Every room is randomly generated, and objects are placed all over the screen. In order to move from room to room, the player simply has to exit the current room through one of the doors one each side of every room. The player receives a point for each time they exit a room and enter another one. The goal of the game is to visit as many rooms as possible, whilst collecting coins, meaning that there is no end and each playthrough is continued until the player is killed.

The overall feel, as well as the graphics and music in the game have been described as "retro" and "nostalgic". The game includes skins inspired by a number of characters from other games, especially retro ones. Some of the skins available for purchase using coins are references to classic icons such as Mario and Sonic the Hedgehog. The game was described by Andrew Buffa from Modojo as something that "looks like it was take [sic] straight from the SNES era".

== Reception ==
Reception

Aggregate score
Aggregator	Score
Metacritic	87/100

Review scores
Publication	Score
Modojo	4.5/5
Pocket Gamer	9/10
TouchArcade	4/5
Gamezebo	4.5/5
Multiplayer.it	8/10

Platform Panic generally received positive reception from critics, with a Metascore of 87. The game was praised for its limited use of in-app purchases, with critics agreeing that the full game was still enjoyable without having to pay money. Gamezebo gave the game four and a half stars for its feel and mechanics, but was disappointed with the lack of additional game modes. A review by Carter Dotson from TouchArcade stated that the controls were excellent and easy to use, but criticized the game for its leaderboard, and the fact that getting onto it would most likely require in app purchases. Modojo generally praised the game for its simplicity and retro style, but was annoyed that the player is forced to move constantly, making the game overly difficult at times.
