= Mouse Work =

Upcoming video game

- Key artwork
- Developer: Nitrome
- Publisher: PM Studios
- Engine: Unity
- Platform: Nintendo Switch 2
- Release: 7 December 2026
- Genre: Party
- Mode: Multiplayer

Mouse Work is an upcoming party video game developed by Nitrome and published by PM Studios for the Nintendo Switch 2. It features a variety of minigames utilizing the mouse functionality of the Joy-Con 2 controller, in which each player controls a pointer-shaped mouse interacting with the environment in different manners. It will release on 7 December 2026.

== Gameplay ==
Mouse Work is a party game in which players control of a mouse undertaking a variety of jobs, each represented by a distinct minigame built around the Joy-Con 2's mouse control functionality. Confirmed jobs include 'Hairdresser', 'Archer', 'Tour Guide', 'Cargo Hauler', and 'IT Support'. Activities in these jobs involve, for example, closing pop-up ads or guiding mountain climbers.

== Development ==
Nitrome began developing Mouse Work before the Nintendo Switch 2's mouse feature was officially revealed, and based the game's concept on industry rumors and a tease of that feature present in the system's announcement video on 16 January 2025. They did not formally receive a software development kit from Nintendo, and used Joy-Con controllers duct taped to computer mice to prototype and develop the game. According to Nitrome founder Mat Annal, they used their experience in creating browser games to make the game very rapidly. The game uses the Unity game engine.

Nitrome cited Pico Park (2016) and Part Time UFO (2017) as inspirations for the game. Several outlets also drew similarities to Snipperclips (2017), another indie game with a multiplayer focus that was released as a launch game for the original Nintendo Switch.

== Release ==
The game was revealed on 7 April 2025, a few days after the console's unveiling during a Nintendo Direct on 2 April 2025 showcasing the console. While no release date was revealed, Nitrome expressed their desire to release it "shortly" after the Switch 2's launch on 5 June 2025. On 10 November 2026, Nitrome announced that the game would release on 7 December 2026, published by PM Studios. A physical version is set to release in 2027.
