= Ice Breaker (video game) =

- Ice Breaker logo
- Publishers: Nitrome Limited (Miniclip), Rovio Stars (iOS)
- Platforms: Miniclip; iOS
- Release: 2009 (Miniclip), 2013 (iOS), 2014 (Android)
- Genre: Puzzle

Ice Breaker is a puzzle game by Nitrome Limited, released on Miniclip on January 5, 2009. Ice Breaker: The Red Clan and Ice Breaker: The Gathering were sequels released afterwards. An iOS adaption entitled Icebreaker: A Viking Voyage was developed by Rovio Stars Ltd. and released June 20, 2013.

== Gameplay ==
The game sees the player guide frozen Vikings to their boat by cutting ice blocks with the mouse or finger.

== Critical reception ==
=== Miniclip games ===
TechNonsense said of the first two games, "It's a good brain trainer if you have spare time. I love its background music." MiniclipGameRater gave IB:RC 3.5 stars, commenting "The object of the game is simple to understand" and "The levels are challenging", while adding "The levels have not changed much since the old game" and "There are some images not suitable for children under 10". Chip gave Ice Breaker: The Gathering a 3/5, writing "Conclusion: "Ice Breaker: The Gathering" is a fun flash game that makes boredom a foreign word."

=== iOS game ===
The iOS version has a rating of 87% on Metacritic based on 12 critic reviews.

SlideToPlay said "Icebreaker: A Viking Voyage is one of the most clever and whimsical games in recent memory, and it does a lot to revitalize the physics-puzzler genre. " AppSpy wrote "Bursting with clever level design and creativity, this physics-puzzler is a cut above the competition. " MacLife said "Icebreakers: A Viking Voyage is a puzzling treat that packs a surprising amount of depth into a few simple mechanics. " Pocket Gamer UK wrote "Witty, varied, challenging and gorgeous to look at, Icebreaker: A Viking Voyage is one of the finest physics-based puzzlers on iOS and an outstanding start for Rovio Stars. " 148Apps said "Icebreaker: A Viking Voyage manages to combine just about every physics puzzle concept out there to surprisingly great effect". Games Master UK described the game as "The most capable and original physics puzzle game since Angry Birds and Cut the Rope. " Gamer.nl said "Icebreaker breaks the ice for Rovio Stars. Its fundamentals are not unlike Angry Birds and Bad Piggies, which come with wildly addicting and easy to get into puzzle gameplay in Icebreaker. But Viking Voyage is more complete and diverse than those games, because it manages to surprise with new puzzle concepts again and again, even though it's so recognizable. "

Vandal Online wrote "This game builds a very solid base where one of the most fun and addictive games for iOS devices can grow from. " Modojo said "Fortunately, there's enough variety and imagination in the level design, not to mention humor in the game's storytelling, to help Icebreaker just about rise above these concerns. You can expect a stiffer challenge here than you'll get from the average physics puzzler, but that's not necessarily a bad thing in 2013. " Apple'N'Apps wrote "Icebreaker: A Viking Voyage reinvigorates the physics puzzle genre, and is a definite chip off the old ice block that is Angry Birds." Gamezebo wrote "The controls in Icebreaker: A Viking Voyage are easy enough to get used to given time, however. Between the game's good humor, varied gameplay, and interesting puzzles, it'd be a shame to sit out this voyage, even though hitting an iceberg is inevitable. " Arcade Sushi said "Giving us two different prices is also a rather blatant form of game gouging, especially when there are a healthy amount of in-game purchases to be had. Even with these complaints, Icebreaker: A Viking Voyage is still worth a look, especially if you have three bucks to blow. "
