= Sonic Extreme =

Prototype video game

- Title screen
- Developer: Vision Scape Interactive
- Series: Sonic the Hedgehog
- Engine: RenderWare
- Platforms: Xbox, PlayStation 2, GameCube
- Release: Unreleased
- Genre: Extreme sports
- Modes: Single-player, multiplayer

Sonic Extreme was a prototype video game created by Vision Scape Interactive in May 2003. Proposed as a spin-off to Sega's Sonic the Hedgehog series, Sonic Extreme featured Sonic and Shadow riding hoverboards in a Green Hill Zone-themed open world, with gameplay likened to Tony Hawk's Pro Skater. It featured three gameplay modes, which included searching for keys and Chaos Emeralds and fighting or racing another player. Vision Scape created the prototype while it made cutscenes for Sonic Heroes (2003); it was developed on the Xbox with intent to port it to the GameCube and PlayStation 2. The prototype was assembled using the RenderWare game engine and assets from prior Vision Scape and Sonic games.

Vision Scape showed Sonic Extreme to Sonic Team head Yuji Naka, who was impressed and asked for a software design description to be submitted to Sega. However, Sega never responded to Vision Scape after the document was turned in. While the game never came to fruition, it may have served as the basis for Sonic Team's Sonic Riders (2006), which features similar gameplay concepts. The Extreme prototype publicly surfaced in May 2011, when gameplay footage was uploaded to YouTube. Journalists reacted negatively and expressed relief it was never released.

== Premise ==
Sonic and Shadow in Sonic Extreme's "Battle" mode

Sonic Extreme was an extreme sports video game in which the player controlled a character riding a hoverboard. It could have featured multiple playable characters from the Sonic the Hedgehog series, but the prototype only featured Sonic and Shadow. Polygon and Digital Trends compared its gameplay to Tony Hawk’s Pro Skater: the player was placed in an open world with rings, crates, boost pads, ramps, half-pipes, and rails, and could perform tricks to boost their score.

The prototype featured three game modes: "Mission", "Combat", and "Race". The "Mission" mode was single-player and involved exploring the environment to collect a key that gave access to a room with a Chaos Emerald. Collecting the emerald returned the player to the title screen. "Combat" was a split-screen multiplayer mode in which players would attack each other with weapons such as rocket launchers, mines, and grenades. "Race" pitted players against each other in a race to the end of a level.

== Development and cancellation ==
Sonic Extreme was developed by Vision Scape Interactive, a San Diego–based studio known for its work on the shoot 'em up SeaBlade for the Xbox and the skateboarding game Tech Deck Dude: Bare Knuckle Grind for Microsoft Windows. While developing Bare Knuckle Grind, Vision Scape decided to use its game engine—created using the RenderWare framework—in other skateboarding games. The first attempt was with a game based on the American animated television series Rocket Power that would have been published by THQ for the GameCube, Xbox, and PlayStation 2, but this game was canceled due to THQ's financial problems. As a number of the staff had backgrounds in animation, Sega hired Vision Scape to produce cutscenes for Sonic Team's game Sonic Heroes (2003).

Vision Scape cofounder Matt McDonald decided to pitch a spinoff that used the Bare Knuckle Grind engine with the Sonic intellectual property (IP). The prototype was developed over the course of a week in May 2003 without Sega's knowledge. It was created on the Xbox because of Vision Scape's experience with the platform, with intent to port it to the GameCube and PlayStation 2. The team retooled Bare Knuckle Grind to resemble Sonic games; for example, the world was based on Green Hill Zone and included traditional Sonic elements such as rings and boost pads. Vision Scape's deal with Sega for Sonic Heroes also gave them access to assets from Sonic games. The studio took models of Sonic and Shadow and repurposed them to ride the hoverboards. Promotional artwork from Sonic Adventure and Sonic Adventure 2 was used for the loading and title screens. Sounds and music were ripped from Sonic Adventure 2.

McDonald held a meeting with Sonic Team head Yuji Naka and showed him the prototype. According to McDonald, Naka was impressed and enthusiastic, and said the project would move forward as a collaboration between Sonic Team and Vision Scape. At Naka's request, Vision Scape produced a software design description for a full Sonic Extreme and its budget; the studio management believed they had secured the deal. However, Sega did not respond to Vision Scape and ended its communications with the studio after it completed the Sonic Heroes cutscenes, despite repeated attempts by Vision Scape's agent for correspondence. McDonald did not take Sega's silence personally, assuming it had its own plans. Ultimately, Sonic Extreme never came to fruition.

== Aftermath ==
=== Sonic Riders and Vision Scape's closure ===
In September 2005, Sega announced Sonic Riders, a new Sonic game developed by Sonic Team. Vision Scape staff were stunned by the resemblances Sonic Riders bore to Sonic Extreme, with characters riding hoverboards and performing tricks through worlds inspired by past Sonic games. Video game historian Liam Robertson noted that, in addition to the hoverboarding, Sonic Extreme's game modes were present in Sonic Riders, although heavily modified. McDonald believed that Sonic Team took Vision Scape's concept before going in a different direction, which he thinks explains Sega's silence. Vision Scape considered taking legal action, but McDonald's agent informed him the non-disclosure agreement the studio signed during the Sonic Heroes development gave Sega ownership of anything they made using a Sega IP.

Vision Scape closed in 2006. McDonald ordered the staff to dispose of their development hardware and a number software development kits were taken to a recycling plant. However, the Sonic Extreme prototype survived and was traded between collectors.

=== Rediscovery and reception ===
Sonic Extreme was publicly revealed in May 2011, when a YouTube user, "ProtonX3", released videos demonstrating the environments and modes. The footage was poorly received by video game journalists. Game Informer and VG247 thought Sonic Extreme looked "predictably" and "compellingly" awful, respectively, and GamesRadar joked it "prov[ed] once again that slapping the word 'extreme' onto any popular franchise, activity or consumer good is a surefire way to guarantee that it will be anything but." The game also elicited commentary on Sega's quality control process; Game Informer and Computer and Video Games expressed relief that it was never released, but questioned why Sega had continued to release other poorly received Sonic games, such as Shadow the Hedgehog, Sonic Riders and its sequels, and Sonic the Hedgehog (2006).

In May 2017, Did You Know Gaming? dedicated an episode of its series Unseen64 to Sonic Extreme. Former members of Vision Scape, including McDonald, were interviewed for the video, while research was provided by Andrew Borman, a video game preservationist and the owner of the prototype. After the video's release, Engadget was positive, saying "Extreme looks like it could've actually been a lot of fun" and favorably compared its battle mode to Mario Kart 8's.
