= The Mountain of Israeli-Palestinian Friendship =

Peak on the Antarctic Peninsula

Coordinates: 66°0′0″S 65°0′0″W

The joint Israeli and Palestinian team display flags of their countries atop The Mountain of Israeli-Palestinian Friendship

The Mountain of Israeli-Palestinian Friendship (Hebrew: הר הידידות הישראלית–פלסטינית) is a 2,770-metre (9,090 ft) peak near the Bruce Plateau on the Antarctic Peninsula. It was climbed and named in 2004 by an 8-member team consisting of four Israelis and four Palestinians.

== Background and preparation ==
The expedition was arranged by the organization Breaking the Ice. The founder of this organization, Nathaniel Heskel, wanted to prove that Palestinians and Israelis could work together despite the troubles in Israel.

The members of the expedition practiced sailing in Tel Aviv, and trained in the French Alps, about two months prior to leaving for Antarctica.

== Team members ==
=== Israeli team members ===
At the time of the expedition, Heskel Nathaniel was 40 years old, and was a property developer in Germany. He served in the Israel Defense Forces for 10 years.

At the time of the expedition, Doron Erel was 44 years old. One of Israel's top mountaineers, he was the first Israeli to climb Mount Everest in 1992. Later, Erel climbed the Seven Summits, the highest mountains of each of the seven continents. In 1990, he took a part in searching for survivors of an avalanche that killed 43 climbers at Lenin Peak. Erel served in the Sayeret Matkal, an elite commando unit of the Israeli army. His parents were Holocaust survivors from Poland.

At the time of the expedition, Avihu Shoshani was a 44-year-old attorney and part of the right-wing political scene in Israel. He spent four years as an elite commando in the Israel Defense Forces.

At the time of the expedition, Yarden Fanta, a PhD candidate, was 33 years old. She trekked from Ethiopia via Sudan to Israel when she was an illiterate 14 years old. She spent the first 12 years of her life helping her family tend cows in a tiny Ethiopian village called Macha.

=== Palestinian team members ===
At the time of the expedition, Nasser Quos, a football coach, was 35 years old. He had spent three years in an Israeli prison for attacking Israeli troops with fire bombs during the First Intifada. Later he had worked as a bodyguard to the PLO Jerusalem representative Faisal Husseini.

At the time of the expedition, Suleiman al-Khatib was 32 years old. A member of the Fatah party, he had been imprisoned in Israeli prison for 10 years, since he was 14 years old, for carrying out actions against Israeli troops. While in prison he had studied Hebrew, English, literature and history.

At the time of the expedition, Ziad Darwish was a 53-year-old journalist. His brother, a member of a radical Palestinian movement, was killed in an Israeli army raid in 1982. His cousin was the famous Palestinian poet Mahmoud Darwish.

At the time of the expedition, 33-year-old Olfat Haider was the only Palestinian on the Israeli national volleyball team. She worked as a gymnastics teacher.

== The expedition ==
The expedition departed from Puerto Williams in Chile on January 1, 2004, aboard the ocean-going yacht Pelagic Australis. The yacht navigated approximately 600 miles in the most hazardous oceans, including circling Cape Horn, passing through the Roaring Forties.

When they arrived in Antarctica, the team trekked for a week until they reached the foot of the mountain. In a high wind and low visibility, in terrain with many crevasses, they started their climb. Roped together in mixed groups of four, using crampons attached to their boots and ice axes in their hands, the Israelis and Palestinians took responsibility for each other's lives. Climbing over a glacier, they reached the summit at 4 p.m. on January 16, 2004.

At the summit, the three Muslim men knelt in prayer, turned towards Mecca. The Israelis opened champagne for everybody. Ziad Darwish was moved to tears. He said: "This moment is so beautiful, seeing Israelis and Palestinians doing this kind of thing together. Yet, it also makes me think of all the horrible things we're doing to one another back home." 13,000 kilometers from their homes in the Middle East the party made the summit statement, which all eight had previously agreed upon:

We, the members of Breaking the Ice, the Israeli-Palestinian expedition to Antarctica, having reached the conclusion of a long journey by land and sea from our homes in the Middle East to the southernmost reaches of the Earth, now stand atop this unnamed mountain. By reaching its summit we have proven that Palestinians and Israelis can cooperate with one another with mutual respect and trust. Despite the deep differences that exist between us, we have shown that we can carry on a sincere and meaningful dialogue. We join together in rejecting the use of violence in the solution of our problems and hereby declare that our peoples can and deserve to live together in peace and friendship. In expression of these beliefs and desires we hereby name this mountain The Mountain of Israeli-Palestinian Friendship.

Days prior to reaching the summit, the groups debated heatedly regarding the wording of the statement they were to give when reaching the summit. Eventually the members agreed to reject any hint of violence in their joint statement.

In spite of bitter disagreements about everything concerning Middle East politics, the team members nonetheless bonded with one another, and helped each other's during sea sickness, bad weather, and low visibility.
