= Leap Day (video game) =

2016 video game

- Google Play banner image, featuring protagonist Yolk and various enemies
- Developer: Nitrome
- Publisher: Nitrome
- Producers: Jon Annal; Mat Annal
- Programmers: Marcin Zemblowski; John Kennedy; Arthur Guibert
- Artist: Gustav Kilman
- Composer: Dave Cowen
- Platforms: iOS; Android
- Release: WW: May 11, 2016
- Genre: Platform
- Mode: Single-player

Leap Day is a 2D level-based platform game developed and published by Nitrome, first released for iOS and Android on May 11, 2016. Players must reach a Gold Cup at top of a procedurally generated level by controlling a character which runs automatically, tapping on the screen to make the character jump in order to collect fruits, dodge enemies and hazards, and progress through the level. A new level is generated every day, with levels from previous days available to play after watching an advertisement.

A sequel, Super Leap Day, was released for iOS, macOS, and tvOS devices on August 6, 2021, as part of the Apple Arcade subscription service. It features gameplay improvements, horizontal levels, and an updated vector art style, which differs from the pixel art used in the first game.

== Gameplay ==
In Leap Day, each level is generated using pre-made sections, with fifteen checkpoints placed throughout the level. The player must reach the Gold Cup at the end of a level, avoiding hazards such as spikes, blades, and a variety of enemies, while also collecting fruits which can be spent to activate checkpoints. At the end of each level, there is a section called the "End Zone", which does not use any pre-made chunks and is wholly unique to that day's level. Players will earn a cup depending on how far they have progressed through a level, receiving a bronze cup at checkpoint 10, a silver cup at checkpoint 5, and a gold cup for completing the level. The character runs automatically, requiring the player to tap on the screen to correctly time jumps and progress through the level.

Each level is assigned one of several different themes which change the aesthetics, enemies, and objects which appear in the level. Themes include a medieval castle, a stormy cavern, a waterfall, a desert, a frozen temple with falling icicles, a sewer with toxic gas, and a casino with pinball flippers and bumpers. Gifts can be earned by progressing through levels, which unlock different characters for the player to use.

== Reception ==
Reception

Aggregate score
Aggregator	Score
Metacritic	84/100

Review scores
Publication	Score
Pocket Gamer	4/5
TouchArcade	4.5/5

Leap Day received "generally favorable reviews" according to review aggregator, Metacritic. TouchArcade praised the game for its simple controls and approach to in-app purchases, writing "Leap Day is the perfect pickup for people who want to find a new platformer to warn them by the fire."
