= Break the Ice =

Break the Ice may refer to:

- Break the Ice (Idiom) an English idiom that means 'to begin or start a conversation'
- "Break the Ice" (Britney Spears song), 2007
- "Break the Ice", a song by Stratovarius on their album Twilight Time
- "Break the Ice", a song by TNT on their album Knights of the New Thunder
- "Break the Ice", a song by Accept released as a bonus track on the CD version of their album Eat the Heat
- "Break the Ice", a song by John Farnham from the 1986 film Rad
- "Break the Ice", theme song of the 2012 Junior Eurovision Song Contest by Kim-Lian
- Break the Ice (festival), a hardcore punk festival held in Melbourne, Australia in 2012–2014
- Icebreaker (facilitation)

== See also ==
- Don't Break the Ice, a game manufactured by Milton Bradley
- Icebreaker (disambiguation)
