= Sonic Riders =

2006 video game

- North American cover art
- Developers: Sonic Team; Now Production
- Publisher: Sega
- Director: Kenjiro Morimoto
- Producer: Takashi Yuda
- Designer: Kenjiro Morimoto
- Programmer: Kenichi Koshida
- Artist: Hideaki Moriya
- Writer: Hiroshi Miyamoto
- Composers: Tomonori Sawada; Fumie Kumatani; Kenichi Tokoi
- Series: Sonic the Hedgehog
- Platforms: GameCube; PlayStation 2; Xbox; Windows
- Release: February 21, 2006: GameCube, PlayStation 2, Xbox; NA: February 21, 2006; JP: February 23, 2006; EU: March 17, 2006; AU: March 23, 2006 (PS2); AU: March 30, 2006 (Xbox) Windows; NA: November 16, 2006; EU: November 24, 2006; AU: February 8, 2007
- Genre: Racing
- Modes: Single-player, multiplayer

Sonic Riders (Note: Japanese: ソニックライダーズ, Hepburn: Sonikku Raidāzu) is a 2006 racing video game developed by Sonic Team and Now Production and published by Sega for the GameCube, PlayStation 2, and Xbox. In the game, the player controls characters from the Sonic the Hedgehog series on hoverboards and competes against opponents—either controlled by computers or other players—in races and battles. The game was released in February 2006 in Japan and North America, with a European release following the next month and a Windows version at the end of the year. A Game Boy Advance version developed by Backbone Entertainment was canceled.

The game was produced in commemoration of the Sonic series' 15th anniversary and was the first major Sonic racing game since Sonic R (1997) by Traveller's Tales. Sonic Team wanted to make their own game that was superior to any previous Sonic racing game. It was designed to appeal to fans of Sonic as well as extreme sports video games; the development team did not take inspiration from any prior games. Sonic Riders was also the last Sonic title produced with the involvement of franchise co-creator Yuji Naka, who acted as executive producer and left Sega shortly after its release.

Sonic Riders was released to mixed reviews from critics, but was a commercial success and was later re-released under the GameCube and PlayStation 2 bestseller lines. Reviewers mostly criticized the gameplay, controls, and overall design; while praise was directed at the game's visual style, soundtrack and sense of speed while racing; the Windows version also received criticism for its technical performance. Many deemed it a lackluster game—both within the Sonic franchise and the racing game medium—that did have its highlights but ultimately fell to its shortcomings. The game received two sequels, Sonic Riders: Zero Gravity (2008) and Sonic Free Riders (2010), which were developed and released to similar commercial success.

== Gameplay ==
An example of gameplay in Sonic Riders, with Sonic in his super form

Sonic Riders is a racing game based around characters racing each other using devices known as "Extreme Gear", anti-gravity-equipped vehicles consisting of hoverboards, hover skates, and hoverbikes. Players compete to finish three laps around a racetrack before their opponents and complete the race in first place. Each race features up to eight characters competing. A key gameplay component is the air tank, displayed in the screen's lower right-hand corner. Air serves as the fuel for Extreme Gear, which is gradually depleted as the race continues. Characters can also perform a Boost, which will give them a sudden burst of speed at the cost of a significant amount of air. If a player boosts into an opponent, their character will attack and overtake them.

Air is also spent more quickly using techniques like drifting, which allows the player to round sharp turns easily, and building tension before a jump, which involves using the air to propel the player higher off the edge of ramps. If a player runs out of air, their character will start running on foot; this prevents them from boosting, attacking, cornering easily, or using charged jumps. Players can refill their air by using pit stops on the track, which force them to stay in place while their air meter recharges, or performing tricks when jumping off ramps or an opponent's slipstream, with higher-rated trick sequences restoring more air. Players can also collect rings scattered across the track; collecting a certain number of rings will cause their character to level up for the remainder of the race, increasing the strength of their abilities and extending their maximum air capacity.

Each character in Sonic Riders has different statistics, altering their performance slightly in races, though some characters are restricted from using certain types of Extreme Gear. Similar to Sonic Heroes, characters are divided into three classes, each with different abilities: Speed characters can grind on rails, Power characters can break certain objects, and Fly characters can fly through boost rings. Each race track features multiple shortcuts that can only be accessed by characters of a specific class. Players can spend the rings they acquire at the in-game shop to purchase new Extreme Gear, each of which possesses unique statistics and properties. The game includes eight unique areas, each with two track variants, for a total of 16 tracks. Only a few tracks are accessible from the start; the remainder are unlocked through game progression.

The game's Story Mode is divided into two campaigns, the events of which intersect with each other: the "Heroes" story, focused on Sonic, Tails, and Knuckles; and the "Babylon" story, focused on new characters Jet the Hawk, Wave the Swallow, and Storm the Albatross. In each campaign, players participate in consecutive races with predetermined characters and must take first place in each race to continue the story. Completing the Heroes campaign unlocks the Babylon campaign, which includes an epilogue in which the two stories converge. Additionally, players can compete in World Grand Prix mode, in which players race through five consecutive tracks and attempt to get the highest overall score. The game also features a Mission Mode with 100 missions to complete, each of which tasks the players with completing a specific objective within a time limit, such as collecting objects on the track or destroying a certain number of obstacles. Completing each mission awards players a bronze, silver, or gold medal based on the player's performance; by completing missions, players can unlock new characters and special Extreme Gear. Up to four players can compete in the game's single race and battle modes.

=== Characters ===
Sonic Riders features 16 playable characters, including guest characters from Nights into Dreams, Space Channel 5, and Super Monkey Ball.

- AiAi
- Amy Rose
- Cream the Rabbit
- Dr. Eggman
- E-10000G
- E-10000R
- Jet the Hawk
- Knuckles the Echidna
- Miles "Tails" Prower
- NiGHTS
- Rouge the Bat
- Shadow the Hedgehog
- Sonic the Hedgehog
- Storm the Albatross
- Ulala
- Wave the Swallow

== Plot ==
Jet, leader of the thieving Babylon Rogues, observes the Key to Babylon Garden, an artifact and family heirloom said to unlock the secrets of their Babylonian ancestors. Doctor Eggman arrives and claims he can use the Chaos Emeralds to make Babylon Garden rise, asking for the Rogues' help in retrieving them. The Rogues agree and steal an Emerald, but run into Sonic, Tails, and Knuckles, who are also looking for the Emerald. Sonic gives chase, but Jet escapes with the Emerald. The next day, the three heroes see Eggman on a digital billboard advertising an Extreme Gear race known as the EX World Grand Prix; participants must offer a Chaos Emerald to enter, with the winner being awarded all seven. When they realize that the Rogues are participating, Sonic and his friends enter as well.

Team Sonic, joined by Amy Rose, compete with the Rogues in several races. During the final race, Wave sabotages Sonic's board, allowing Jet to defeat Sonic and win the Grand Prix. Jet uses the Chaos Emeralds to make Babylon Garden appear, hoping to discover the legendary treasure of the Babylonians. Eggman steals the Key from Jet, intent on taking the treasure for himself, and heads for the garden, with Amy grabbing Eggman's ship in an attempt to stop him. Sonic grabs a new board and pursues Eggman, but Jet challenges him to another race, seeking to defeat Eggman first. The two arrive at Babylon Garden and find Eggman, who is holding Amy hostage. Combining their powers, Jet and Sonic manage to retrieve Amy and the Key.

Jet uses the Key to open a secret door, leading the Rogues inside a Babylonian ruin. Team Sonic follow them inside, where they encounter the Babylon Guardian, a giant creature tasked with protecting the treasure. The two teams defeat the Guardian, causing a chest to appear. Eggman returns and demands they give him the treasure, but passes out in confusion upon discovering the treasure is only a carpet. Using the Key, Jet manages to make the carpet fly, revealing the magic carpet to be an early form of Extreme Gear. Team Sonic and the Babylon Rogues go their separate ways, with Jet promising to race Sonic again one day.

== Development ==
I was not interested in making a conventional racing game. I wanted to make something different and dynamic, to have tricks and stuff. To do that, you can't really be in a car, so inevitably, we came up with other ideas. We thought things like surfing and snowboarding have more flexibility to allow you to do tricks.

— Takashi Yuda, on Sonic Riders's gameplay style.

Sonic Riders was developed by Sonic Team and Now Production for the GameCube, PlayStation 2, Xbox and Windows in commemoration of the Sonic series' 15th anniversary. The game was directed by Kenjiro Morimoto and produced by Takashi Yuda. Series co-creator Yuji Naka served as executive producer. Sonic Riders was the last Sonic game that Naka was involved with, providing input at the beginning of development and additional advice as the game progressed. He resigned to form his own company, Prope, shortly after its release to focus on original games. The game runs at 60 frames per second, and features a 2D animated opening cutscene produced by Production I.G and directed by Kazuto Nakazawa, as well as CG-animated cutscenes by Marza Animation Planet.

Riders was the series' first major racing game since Traveller's Tales developed Sonic R in 1997. (Note: Racing games produced between R and Riders include Sonic Racing Shift Up (2002), Sonic Racing Kart (2003), and Sonic Kart 3D X (2005), all for mobile devices as part of the Sonic Cafe service.) According to Yuda, in the years after Sonic R's release, Sonic Team received numerous requests from fans for another Sonic racer. Though he played and enjoyed Sonic R, Yuda believed Sonic Team, "who knows Sonic best", should make another game that was superior to any previous Sonic racing game. Yuda also did not want to make a conventional racing game, instead desiring a dynamic, unique style of gameplay that would allow the player to perform tricks. Being able to do this in a car was illogical; Sonic Team noted that surfing and snowboarding were more flexible. As the concept had a heavy emphasis on air, hoverboards were chosen since they could work in any environment and still be fun to use.

Sonic Riders was primarily designed to appeal to fans of Sonic and extreme sports games, while the multiplayer modes were included for casual gamers. Yuda has said Sonic Team did not take any influences from prior Sonic games, reasoning they wanted to create a truly new experience that was unlike anything else from other Sonic games. The characters were chosen based on how relevant to the game's story they would be. The game's antagonists, the Babylon Rogues, were created because Sonic Team wanted to include "Air Pirates" as Sonic's rivals. Yuda considered them best-suited for Sonic series racing games, and noted Sonic characters are usually designed with one specific storyline in mind. Levels were designed to be "crazy" but still feature classic Sonic elements.

A Game Boy Advance version, alternatively known as Sonic Extreme was developed by Backbone Entertainment for three months but never released. According to artist Keith Erickson, it used an Out Run-style game engine and was supposed to be launched at the same time as the other versions. Sega of Japan learned of this version and requested that Backbone add more 3D elements, but keep it on the same production schedule. This would have required the engine to be completely rewritten, something Backbone considered impossible, so Sega canceled it.

The score was composed by Tomonori Sawada, Fumie Kumatani, and Kenichi Tokoi. Two vocal themes were written for the game and performed by the artist Runblebee, "Sonic Speed Riders" (written by Sawada) and "Catch Me If You Can" (written by Runblebee). Yuda said the music was written to be "fast paced and give you that heart pounding feeling you should have during a high-speed race". A soundtrack album, Sonic Riders Original Soundtrack "Speedbeats Grand Prix", was released on March 16, 2006.

== Release and marketing ==
Sonic Riders was announced in the September 2005 issue of Famitsu, before being showcased at the Tokyo Game Show that same month. Prerelease reception to Sonic Riders was mostly positive, with some criticism towards its loose controls; Mike Jackson wrote for Nintendo Official Magazine "There's no doubt that if the handling is tightened up, this will be a very cool racer. If it's not, we'll avoid it like a lingering fart," predicting a review score of 60%. NGC Magazine was more positive about the game, comparing it favorably to SSX (2000) and considering it a more fun experience than Kirby's Air Ride (2003, which they scored 51%). IGN noted some pop-in on the PlayStation 2 demo, but that both it and the GameCube versions were otherwise identical, also stating "what we saw of Sonic Riders suggests that a fun, original racer awaits."

The console versions were released in North America on February 21, 2006, Japan on February 23, 2006, Europe on March 17, 2006, and Australia on March 23, 2006; BradyGames published an official strategy guide for the game shortly before its release for Western markets, while Shogakukan released a separate guide for Japan in April 2006. As part of the 15th anniversary celebration of the Puyo Puyo series, Sonic could be encountered as a guest character in the Windows version of Puyo Pop Fever (2003). The Windows version was released for international markets in late 2006; while it was not released in Japan, it nonetheless can switch to Japanese text and voices. The Windows version was later re-released as part of the PAL-exclusive Sonic PC Collection on October 1, 2009.

== Reception ==
Reception

Aggregate scores
| Aggregator | Score |
|---|---|
| GameRankings | 63% (GCN); 59% (XB); 60% (PS2); 43% (PC) |
| Metacritic | 59/100 (GCN); 56/100 (XB); 55/100 (PS2) |

Review scores
| Publication | Score |
|---|---|
| 1Up.com | D+ (PS2); C (Xbox) |
| Electronic Gaming Monthly | 5.2/10 (Note: Electronic Gaming Monthly's three reviewers gave two 5/10 scores, and one 5.5/10 score.) |
| Eurogamer | 5/10 |
| GamePro | 63/100 |
| GameRevolution | C (Note: GameRevolution abandoned letter-based scores for games in 2012, with the website retroactively updating the Riders score to 4/10.) |
| GameSpot | 6.6/10 |
| GameSpy | 2.5/5 |
| GamesRadar+ | 2.5/5 |
| IGN | 6.2/10; 4.2/10 (PC) |
| Nintendo Power | 8/10 |
| Nintendo World Report | 6/10 |

According to the review aggregator website Metacritic, Sonic Riders received "mixed or average" reviews.

The game's presentation received mixed reactions from reviewers. GameSpot thought the visuals were well-produced and praised the brightly colored levels and character models, but noted frame rate drops and thought the environments looked "kind of drab and muddy" when the gameplay slowed down. GameSpy agreed and cited the graphics as one of the best parts of the game. IGN was more conflicted: they praised the graphical effects and backgrounds, but were critical of the blocky geometry and blurry textures and thought it was not as pretty as competing games. Nintendo World Report (NWR) also called the graphics inconsistent. Of the game's music, IGN and GameSpot agreed it was just generic Sonic melodies, but IGN wrote the game had "a few surprisingly ambient and worldly tracks that ... better fit with the themes of the different locales." NWR called the soundtrack fitting. The PC port, released later on, was criticized for its poor performance on certain setups.

Reviewers criticized or had little praise for the core gameplay and controls. GamesRadar+ derided the loose, floaty physics engine, writing it caused cheap deaths. Eurogamer thought the premise showed promise and worked well as races started, but found it ultimately became messy, complicated, and convoluted. IGN lamented that the game was "neither a full-fledged racer or an engaging snowboarder, but a shallow compromise of both." They also found the hoverboards were technically pointless when considering that Sonic is fast on his own. GameSpy described the gameplay design of racing, attacking opponents, and performing tricks as inconsistent: "Most games quickly prioritize these actions for you based on results," they wrote, "but Sonic Riders seems to yield similar results no matter what".

Still, the game's sense of speed was generally praised. IGN wrote "Sonic Team has done a solid job of delivering on speed and anarchy" and cited the pace as making races unpredictable and fun. GameSpot agreed and described the turbulence-riding as inventive. Eurogamer thought the speed was exciting and wrote it reminded them of the original Sega Genesis Sonic games. GamePro was more critical, agreeing with Eurogamer the speed was exciting but feeling that it made the game feel "more like a surreal rollercoaster ride than a game". Difficulty maintaining speed was noted by many reviewers. GamesRadar+ called it "almost impossible... Clipping a corner or bumping into a wall can bring your 200mph screamfest to a complete halt", and Eurogamer wrote it was the game's biggest flaw. The pitstop system was especially criticized; GameSpy wrote it made no sense for a Sonic game, and GameSpot said it sucked the fun out of Sonic Riders.

Overall, reviewers deemed Sonic Riders an average entry in the Sonic franchise. IGN believed it was an improvement from the series' previous game Shadow the Hedgehog and would be fun for Sonic fans, but was nonetheless found its design choices questionable and felt it simply existed to cash in on the popularity of snowboarding game franchises like SSX. GameSpot said the game was occasionally entertaining but suffered from lackluster gameplay, and GamesRadar+ thought it proved that the once iconic Sonic franchise "has now become a dumping ground for half-baked games."

Sonic Riders was a commercial success; upon release, the GameCube version was the second best-selling game for the system, remaining among the top 10 until June 2006. Throughout 2006, the game sold 930,000 copies, with an additional 560,000 units in North America by the end of March 2007. In the UK, Riders debuted in the top 40 before climbing to first place. The GameCube and PlayStation 2 versions were later branded as part of the Player's Choice and Greatest Hits budget lines.

== Legacy ==
Following the commercial success of Riders, Yuda stated there would certainly be a follow up. A sequel, Sonic Riders: Zero Gravity, was released for the PlayStation 2 and Wii in 2008, with planned ports to the Xbox 360 and PlayStation 3 conceived but never realized. The gameplay of Zero Gravity remains similar to its predecessor, but replaces the air system with a gravity-altering mechanic alongside other minor changes; like its predecessor, Sonic Riders: Zero Gravity received a generally mixed critical reception. A third game, Sonic Free Riders, was released as a launch title for the Xbox 360's Kinect peripheral on November 4, 2010, with the gameplay once again altered to have players use motion controls to move around the board; critical reception to Free Riders was poor, primarily due to the unreliability of said motion controls. Free Riders would be the last Sonic racing game with Extreme Gear until the release of the kart racing game Sonic Racing: CrossWorlds (2025), which also allows players to race using Extreme Gear.

Despite their generally negative reception from critics, the Babylon Rogues have made sporadic appearances across the Sonic series. Archie Comics published a brief adaptation of the game in their Sonic the Hedgehog comic series, as well as further plot points featuring the Babylon Rogues in Sonic Universe. After IDW Publishing began printing their Sonic comics, the Babylon Rogues were reintroduced in the 2019 Annual, and they would be featured in multiple subsequent story arcs. Sonic Racing: CrossWorlds also features the Babylon Rogues as playable characters.

In May 2011, an unfinished sports game titled Sonic Extreme leaked online from an Xbox development kit. The tech demo has Sonic and Shadow skating around on hoverboards in a single level filled with ramps, similar to the Tony Hawk's Pro Skater series by Activision. It was developed by Vision Scape Interactive in May 2003, who produced the cutscenes for Sonic Heroes (2003) and had been pitched to Yuji Naka in the hopes of creating a full game. While Naka did approve of a software design description for the project, Sega never responded and cut-off all communications with the studio after the release of Heroes; when Riders was officially announced, the Vision Scape staff were shocked by the similarities to the tech demo and considered taking legal action, only to be informed that their non-disclosure agreement gave Sega ownership of any idea using a Sega IP. When the tech demo leaked online, several publications similarly pointed out the resemblance to Riders.
