= Nitrome =

Video game developer based in London, England

Nitrome Games Limited
- Type: Private
- Industry: Video games
- Founded: 10 August 2004; 22 years ago
- Founders: Matthew Annal; Heather Stancliffe
- Headquarters: London, England
- Key people: Jonathan Roy Annal; Matthew Annal
- Website: www.nitrome.com

Nitrome Games Limited is a British independent video game developer based in London. The company previously developed Flash and Unity games for web browsers, but now publishes and develops games across multiple platforms including mobile, Nintendo Switch, and PS4, with a few releases on Steam.

Their games are recognizable by the pixel art design and cartoon-like appearance, along with a jingle to the start of every game and the use of chiptune.

Nitrome was started on August 10th, 2004 by Matthew Annal and Heather Stancliffe, two graphic designers, intending to create games for mobile phones. Instead, the company began taking on commissions for Internet-based flash games. Some of Nitrome's games feature characters which are inspired by other characters from video games, TV shows, and various other sources. Nitrome's online games are published on their website, and were available to license on other websites such as Miniclip, MTV Arcade and PCH Games.

== History ==
Nitrome's creation stemmed from a conversation between Matthew Annal and Heather Stancliffe, in which Annal suggested that they make a game for mobile phones. Stancliffe was initially hesitant, but was persuaded that it could be a successful idea. The temporary website for their upcoming project was first launched on 3 April 2005, with a preview video of Chick Flick, their intended first game. Since then, Nitrome has made 146 flash games, and are venturing into mobile phone and PC gaming, as their current flash games aren't providing enough revenue. In September 2011, Annal was joined by his brother, Jonathan Roy Annal. On 24 November 2011 Nitrome released their 100th game, Nitrome Must Die, in which players shoot enemies from their previous 99 games. In 2015, Nitrome released their 140th game, Fluffball, a previously unreleased game from 2007. Their first published game, Ultimate Briefcase, was released in 2016. In 2017, a teaser for the game Bomb Chicken was released. In 2018, it was revealed that same game would arrive on the Nintendo Switch.

In May 2020, the company announced a partnership with Poki B.V, an Amsterdam-based online game publisher, in order to port their Flash-based games to HTML5.

In 2022, Nitrome partnered with Limited Run Games to distribute Gunbrick: Reloaded (a remastered version of their flash game Gunbrick) on physical Nintendo Switch cartridges. This was not a part of the Limited Run collection, however. LRG only helped with distribution.

== Games ==
The games made by the company are divided into four main categories. "Hearted" are the games that have received the most hearts from the heart button upon every game, and are thus considered the most popular. "All Games" is a list of all games produced by Nitrome, while "Multiplayer games" are designed for more than one person to play at once. Last, "Touchy", released in 2012, featured games that are playable on Nitrome's mobile phone app, Nitrome Touchy. Games can be in more than one category. On 8 July 2015 Nitrome announced that Nitrome Touchy was officially discontinued. All links and services related to Touchy were taken down. Turn-Undead was the final Touchy game, released October 2014.

Nitrome has made games for MTV Arcade, PCH Games and Miniclip.

Most of the games are divided into levels (usually between 10 and 100), and also give the player the option to replay any level they have completed, even if they have lost. Some games also feature the concept of bosses.

In July 2009, Nitrome Ltd released Twin Shot 2, their first game to use MochiCoins, a system allowing players to pay for extra content in browser games. Matthew Annal said that Nitrome were "trialling" and that they "don't intend to use it in every game". They used MochiCoins again in B.C. Bow Contest, which they have updated twice. MochiCoins, however, were discontinued by Mochi Media, preventing Nitrome from using them in any more of their games. As a result, Twin Shot 2 and B.C. Bow Contest were updated so their extra content would instead be paid with (free to obtain) in-game currency.

Since 2014, Nitrome's game development has focused on producing mobile games.

=== Web games ===
- Hot Air! (2005)
- Sandman (2006)
- Chick Flick (2006)
- Roly Poly (2006)
- Feed Me (2006)
- Tanked Up (2006)
- Scribble (2006)
- Gift Wrapped (2006)
- Frost Bite (2007)
- Skywire (2007)
- Space Hopper (2007)
- Dangle (2007)
- Hot Air 2 (2007)
- Square Meal (2007)
- Toxic (2007)
- Magic Touch (2007)
- Yin Yang (2007)
- Nanobots (2007)
- Off the Rails (2007)
- Headcase (2007)
- Pest Control (2007)
- Twang (2007)
- Thin Ice (2007)
- Snow Drift (2007)
- Jack Frost (2007)
- Aquanaut (2008)
- Go Go UFO (2008)
- Dirk Valentine (2008)
- Magneboy (2008)
- Cheese Dreams (2008)
- Snot Put (2008)
- Knuckleheads (2008)
- Skywire 2 (2008)
- Small Fry (2008)
- Mutiny (2008)
- Final Ninja (2008)
- Onekey (2008)
- Mallet Mania (2008)
- In the Dog House (2008)
- Numbskull (2008)
- Bomba (2008)
- Flipside (2008)
- Toxic II (2008)
- Fat Cat (2008)
- Frost Bite 2 (2008)
- Ice Breaker (2009)
- Pixel Pop (2009)
- Flash Cat (2009)
- Twin Shot (2009)
- Mirror Image (2009)
- Glassworks (2009)
- Ice Breaker: The Red Clan (2009)
- Rustyard (2009)
- Final Ninja Zero (2009)
- Cosmic Cannon (2009)
- Powerup (2009)
- Droplets (2009)
- Double Edged (2009)
- Castle Corp (2009)
- Parasite (2009)
- Twin Shot 2 (2009)
- Rockitty (2009)
- Nebula (2009)
- Cave Chaos (2009)
- Graveyard Shift (2009)
- B.C. Bow Contest (2009)
- Cold Storage (2009)
- Ice Breaker: The Gathering (2009)
- Avalanche (2009)
- Rubble Trouble New York (formerly Rubble Trouble) (2010)
- Skywire VIP (2010)
- Blast RPG (2010)
- Tiny Castle (2010)
- Chisel (2010)
- Bullethead (2010)
- Fault Line (2010)
- Ribbit (2010)
- Worm Food (2010)
- Squawk (2010)
- Temple Glider (2010)
- Sky Serpents (2010)
- Enemy 585 (2010)
- Super Treadmill (2010)
- Bad Ice-Cream (2010)
- Rush (2010)
- The Bucket (2011)
- Canary (2011)
- Test Subject Blue (2011)
- Chisel 2 (2011)
- Knight Trap (2011)
- Steamlands (2011)
- Test Subject Green (2011)
- Silly Sausage (2011)
- Test Subject Arena (2011)
- Office Trap (2011)
- Rubble Trouble Tokyo (2011)
- Canopy (2011)
- Mega Mash (2011)
- Steamlands Player Pack (2011)
- Stumped (2011)
- Nitrome Must Die (2011)
- Lockehorn (2011)
- Rubble Trouble Moscow (2011)
- Rainbogeddon (2012)
- Swindler (2012)
- Skywire VIP Extended (2012)
- Gunbrick (2012)
- Cave Chaos 2 (2012)
- Super Snot Put (2012)
- Hot Air Jr (2012)
- J-J-Jump (2012)
- Skywire VIP Shuffle (2012)
- Calamari (2012)
- Turnament (2012)
- Swindler 2 (2012)
- Ice Beak (2012)
- Bad Ice-Cream 2 (2012)
- Plunger (2013)
- Super Stock Take (2013)
- Test Subject Complete (2013)
- Colourblind (2013)
- Oodlegobs (2013)
- Test Subject Arena 2 (2013)
- Cheese Dreams: New Moon (2013)
- Bad Ice-Cream 3 (2013)
- changeType() (2014)
- Ditto (2014)
- Flue (2014)
- Bump Battle Royale (2014)
- Coil (2014)
- Turn-Undead (2014)
- Endless Doves (2014)
- Submolok (2014)
- Roller Polar (2014)
- Platform Panic (2014)
- Fluffball (initially planned then cancelled in 2007) (2015)
- Silly Sausage in Meat Land (2015)
- Cooped Up (2015)
- Green Ninja (2015)
- Vault! (2015)
- Beneath the Lighthouse (2016)
- Rust Bucket (2016)

=== Mobile games ===
- Nitrome Touchy (2012) (Android, iOS)
- Icebreaker: A Viking Voyage (2013) (Android, iOS, Fire OS)
- 8Bit Doves (2014) (Android, iOS, Fire OS)
- Endless Doves (2014) (Android, iOS)
- Roller Polar (2014) (Android, iOS)
- Platform Panic (2014) (Android, iOS, Fire OS)
- Gunbrick (Mobile) (2015) (Android, iOS, Fire OS)
- Magic Touch: Wizard for Hire (2015) (Android, iOS, Fire OS)
- Silly Sausage in Meat Land (2015) (Android, iOS, Fire OS)
- Cooped Up (2015) (Android, iOS, Fire OS)
- Green Ninja: Year of the Frog (2015) (Android, iOS, Fire OS)
- Vault! (2015) (Android, iOS, Fire OS)
- Beneath the Lighthouse (2015) (Android, iOS, Apple TV)
- Gopogo (2015) (Android, iOS)
- Rust Bucket (2015) (Android, iOS)
- Ultimate Briefcase (2016) (developed by Quite Fresh Games) (Android (removed), iOS)
- Leap Day (2016) (Android, iOS)
- Redungeon (2016) (developed by Eneminds) (Android, iOS)
- Stretch Dungeon (2016) (Android, iOS)
- Magic Mansion (2016) (developed by Sets and Settings) (Android, iOS)
- Hop Swap (2016) (Android, iOS)
- Silly Sausage: Doggy Dessert (2016) (Android, iOS)
- Drop Wizard Tower (2017) (developed by Neutronized) (Android, iOS)
- Flat Pack (2017) (Android, iOS)
- Turn-Undead: Monster Hunter (2017) (Android, iOS)
- Tower Fortress (2017) (developed by Keybol) (Android, iOS)
- Slime Pizza (2018) (developed by Neutronized) (Android, iOS)
- Nano Golf (2018) (developed by Rhubarbist) (Android, iOS)
- Colourblind (2018) (Android, iOS)
- Spike City (2018) (developed by Joseph Gribbin) (Android, iOS)
- In the Dog House (2018) (Android, iOS)
- Turn-Undead 2 (2018) (Android, iOS)
- Nano Golf: Hole in One (2019) (developed by Rhubarbist) (Android, iOS)
- Spicy Piggy (2019) (developed by Gypopothomas) (Android, iOS)
- Sprint RPG (2019) (developed by Fungus) (Android, iOS)
- Bomb Chicken (2020) (Android, iOS)
- Super Leap Day (2021) (iOS, Apple Arcade)

=== Demo games ===
- Cheese Dreams Demo (2012)
- Hot Air Jr Demo (2012)
- Flightless Demo (2012)

=== Cancelled games ===
- Chick Flick (mobile) (2005)
- Four Play (2005)
- Unnamed robot game
- Square Meal 2
- Cheese Dreams direct sequel
- Super Feed Me (2010) (iOS, possibly on Android)
- Surface (2011)
- Sucknblo (2012)
- Cheese Dreams: New Moon (part 2) (2014)
- Plod (2015) (Android, iOS, Fire OS)
- Sonic Day (2018) (Android, iOS)

=== Console games ===
Year	Title	Genre	Platform(s)	Additional note(s)
2018	Bomb Chicken	Puzzle-platform	Nintendo Switch, PS4, Windows, macOS, Android, iOS	
2020	Gunbrick: Reloaded	Puzzle-platform	Nintendo Switch, Windows, macOS	Expanded port of the Flash and mobile versions of Gunbrick; its classic Flash levels and new isometric levels were later backported to mobile. Physical Switch version was distributed by Limited Run Games in 2022, but is not a numbered LRG release.
2022	Shovel Knight Dig	Platform, roguelite	Nintendo Switch, Windows, Apple Arcade	Co-developed and published by Yacht Club Games
2026	Twin Shot Deluxe	Platform	Nintendo Switch, Windows, macOS, Android, iOS	Remake of the Flash titles Twin Shot and Twin Shot 2.
2026	Mouse Work	Puzzle	Nintendo Switch 2	Published by PM Studios.
TBA	Silly Sausage Buffet	Action	Nintendo Switch, Windows, macOS, Android, iOS	Collection of Silly Sausage, Silly Sausage in Meat Land, and Silly Sausage: Doggy Dessert.
TBA	Bad Ice Cream Triple Scoop	Maze	Nintendo Switch, Windows, macOS	Remake of the Bad Ice-Cream trilogy.
TBA	Bad Ice Cream Resort	Maze	Nintendo Switch, Windows, macOS	The fourth game in the Bad Ice-Cream series.
