= Breaking the Ice (organization) =

Peace project founded by Heskel Nathaniel

Breaking the Ice is a peace project founded by Heskel Nathaniel.

== Breaking the Ice ==
Breaking the Ice is an international non-profit foundation that brings together people from different cultures, viewpoints or sides of a conflict in the hope of overcoming the barriers of mistrust, misunderstanding and fear that are the root causes of conflict and violence in our world.

Breaking the Ice was founded by Nathaniel and other European international business professionals, who are deeply convinced that people can overcome their differences by facing challenges together. In 2004, the foundation brought eight people from Israel and the Palestinian territories together in a month-long sailing and mountain climbing expedition to Antarctica. Their journey to break the ice received the support and public endorsements of Nobel Peace Prize Laureates the Dalai Lama, Shimon Peres, Mikhail Gorbachev, Kofi Annan, and many more. Furthermore, their journey also received worldwide media coverage on channels like CNN, BBC, etc. as well as international newspapers. More than 553 million people in 59 countries and 25 languages followed the story of Breaking the Ice.

Breaking the Ice is currently planning its next "peace mission" for March 2006

=== The team ===
Men and women - Jews, Christians and Muslims - from Afghanistan, Iraq, Iran, Israel, Lebanon, the Palestinian territories and the United States will join in mind, body and spirit to cross the Sahara Desert and the territories of five countries and cultures. The identities of the team will be disclosed shortly before the journey begins.

=== The route ===
Setting off on March 1, 2006, the team will embark on a three-week journey from Jerusalem to Tripoli, crossing one of the harshest terrains on the planet.

=== The challenge ===
The diverse team members will confront physical and spiritual terrain that has witnessed conflict throughout the centuries. Testing themselves against the challenges of their surroundings and their own conflicting relationships, they can only succeed if they rely on and trust one another.

=== News coverage ===
A news broadcasting team will accompany the journey and transmit daily coverage to international TV, print media, radio and the Internet.

=== Documentary ===
A film production crew will film the journey. Oscar-winning editor Pietro Scalia, whose feature film credits include JFK, Black Hawk Down, Gladiator, Hannibal and Born on the Fourth of July, will serve as editorial supervisor for the production of the documentary.

== See also ==
- The Mountain of Israeli-Palestinian Friendship
- West-Eastern Divan
