= Bomb Chicken =

2018 video game

- Developer: Nitrome
- Publishers: Nitrome; Mighty Rabbit Studios (PS4)
- Producers: Jon Annal; Mat Annal
- Programmers: Tomas Normand; Aaron Steed; Romain Macré
- Artist: Gustav Kilman
- Composer: Dave Cowen
- Engine: Unity
- Platforms: Switch, macOS, Windows, PlayStation 4, iOS, Android
- Release: Switch: NA/EU: July 12, 2018; macOS, Windows: WW: April 16, 2019; PlayStation 4: WW: April 30, 2019; Android, iOS: WW: April 1, 2020
- Genre: Puzzle-platform
- Mode: Single-player

Bomb Chicken is a 2D puzzle-platform game developed and published by Nitrome. The game was first released in the Americas and Europe on July 12, 2018, for the Nintendo Switch game console through the Nintendo eShop download service, followed by versions for macOS and Microsoft Windows in April 2019 and one for PlayStation 4 in April 2019. Ports for Android and iOS were released in April 2020.

Set in a Latin American jungle, the player controls a chicken who can lay multiple bombs, which are used to solve puzzles and defeat enemies in order to escape a processing plant run by BFC, a large fast-food chain. Bomb Chicken was well received by critics, who praised its gameplay and presentation, but criticized its short length.

== Gameplay ==
The player character, the chicken, can lay multiple bombs in a stack to ascend. Should the green, armored enemy at the bottom touch the stack, all the bombs will explode in a chain reaction. The enemy on the top platform guards the blue gems that surround it.

Bomb Chicken is a 2D puzzle-platformer where the player controls a chicken who can lay bombs instead of eggs. The chicken obtained this power after an accident involving the mysterious blue sauce that is being mined by BFC (parody to KFC), a large fast-food chain. Unlike in most platformers, the chicken cannot jump; instead, it ascends by laying bombs which it stands on top of. The chicken can lay multiple bombs in a stack in order to reach higher places. The bombs automatically explode a few seconds after laying them, so the chicken must move quickly after laying them. Bombs can be pushed by the chicken so that they fly into enemies and obstacles. The chicken uses these abilities to try to escape BFC's mining operation, with settings including a factory and overgrown Mesoamerican ruins. The chicken faces several foes, ranging from BFC workers to aggressive natives, most of which can be defeated by using a bomb or landing on top of them. Obstacles include blocks which can be blown up, flying arrows, platforms that fall when the chicken steps on them, and fireballs that hop out of lava. Switches are a common puzzle element and can be pressed to open mechanical doors. Some of them are on a timer, while others only stay active if something stays on top of them. Certain doors are also opened by taking keycards to them. The game has a total of 29 levels spread across three worlds.

The chicken dies after taking one hit, after which it loses a life, which only replenishes after clearing a level or getting a game over, which happens when the chicken loses all its lives. Within the levels are blue gems that the chicken can collect, as well as hidden rooms which house even more gems. Between each level is an opportunity to trade a certain number gems to increase the player's maximum extra lives. With each trade, the threshold for gems increases, so the player will have to collect more gems across multiple levels in order to meet this minimum requirement.

== Development ==
Bomb Chicken was developed by UK-based studio Nitrome, which had previously exclusively made browser games and mobile games. The game was first announced on March 16, 2017, via a teaser on YouTube and was posted to Steam Greenlight the same day. The game was originally scheduled for release in 2017, but was later delayed to 2018. On March 20, 2018, Nitrome confirmed the game would launch first on Nintendo Switch, marking their first console game. A Japanese release was also announced, and the game released there on November 1, 2018. Nitrome has also said that they are open to downloadable content should the game sell well enough, as well as a physical release. A physical release for Nintendo Switch and PlayStation 4 was released on March 29, 2019, courtesy of Limited Run Games. The game was announced for download for macOS and Microsoft Windows via Steam alongside a PlayStation 4 version on April 16, 2019. Ports for Android and iOS were released on April 1, 2020.

== Reception ==
Reception

Aggregate score
Aggregator	Score
Metacritic	NS: 77/100

Review scores
Publication	Score
Destructoid	8/10
Electronic Gaming Monthly	4/5
Nintendo Life	8/10
Nintendo World Report	8.5/10

Bomb Chicken received "generally favorable reviews" according to review aggregator, Metacritic.
