= Icebreaker: A Viking Voyage =

2013 video game

- Developer(s): Nitrome
- Publisher(s): Nitrome
- Platform(s): Android, iOS
- Release: June 20, 2013 (iOS); May 7, 2014 (Android)
- Genre(s): Puzzle

Icebreaker: A Viking Voyage is a puzzle video game developed by Nitrome that was published by Rovio Entertainment under the Rovio Stars program. However, as of April 2014 the game is published by Nitrome and is no longer published by Rovio Stars by mutual agreement.

The game contains the first episodes based on the flash game of the same title. The game was released on iOS in June 2013 and was released on Android in May 2014.

The storyline is that an icy wind has swept the Vikings away, leaving them stranded throughout the land and surrounded by deadly traps and dangerous enemies. The player must rescue the Vikings by bringing them back to their longship.

== Episodes ==
| # | Episode | Levels | Release date | Boss |
|---|---|---|---|---|
| 1 | Hammerfest | 19 | 20 June 2013 | None |
| 2 | Troll Marsh | 39 | 20 June 2013 | The Mountain Troll |
| 3 | Under Dwell | 38 | 20 June 2013 | The Serpent |
| 4 | Kraken | 40 | 7 May 2014 | Kraken (The Brain) |

== Gameplay ==
Gameplay consists of cutting across objects such as ice, wood, stone or ropes in order to rescue the Vikings.
