= List of Saint Seiya video games =

Saint Seiya
- Genre: Action
- Developer: Various
- Publishers: Bandai; Bandai Namco Entertainment
- Composer: Various
- Platforms: Android, Game Boy, iOS, LCD game, Nintendo Entertainment System, PC, PlayStation 2, PlayStation 3, PlayStation 4, PlayStation Portable, WonderSwan Color
- First release: Saint Seiya: Ōgon Densetsu; August 10, 1987
- Latest release: Saint Seiya: Soldiers' Soul; September 25, 2015

The Saint Seiya video game series are based on the manga and anime series of the same name created by Masami Kurumada. The games are of various genres, mostly fighting games and beat 'em ups, with occasional elements of role-playing games and platform games. Other genres include educational games and card battle games.

Several video games have been released based on the series. Most video games refer mainly to the classic series from 1986.

Since 1987, many video games based on the property have been released in Japan, with the majority being published by Bandai. Most of the releases remained Japan-exclusive until 2005, with the exception of the first title in the series, Saint Seiya: Ōgon Densetsu, which was also released in France. Recent games in the series were also made available in Australia, South Korea, Brazil and parts of South America and Europe. In 2013, a title in the series was released in North America for the first time.

Characters from Saint Seiya have appeared in a number of games published by Bandai and Bandai Namco Entertainment including Famicom Jump: Hero Retsuden (1988), Jump! Ultimate Stars (2006), J-Stars Victory VS (2014) and Jump Force (2019).

== Main series ==
Most video games refer mainly to the classic series Saint Seiya from 1986/1990:

Title	Original release date		
Title	Japan	North America	PAL region
Saint Seiya: Ōgon Densetsu (Note: 聖闘士星矢 黄金伝説, Saint Seiya: Golden Legend)	Japan, August 10, 1987 (Famicom)	—N/a	France, 1987 (NES)
Notes: Role-playing game originally released in Japan in 1987 for the Famicom; Gameplay has platforming and beat 'em up elements; Released in France in 1987 with text translated to French; The game topped the bi-weekly Japanese Famitsu sales charts from June 1988 to July 1988.; An enhanced port of the game was released for the Bandai Wonderswan as Saint Seiya: Ōgon Densetsu Hen Perfect Edition in 2003
Saint Seiya: Ōgon Densetsu Kanketsu Hen	Japan, May 30, 1988 (Famicom)	—N/a	—N/a
Notes: Role-playing game originally released in Japan in 1987 for the Famicom; Gameplay has platforming and beat 'em up elements
Saint Paradise: Saikyō no Senshitachi	Japan, November 13, 1992 (Game Boy)	—N/a	—N/a
Notes: Card battling game released only in Japan for the Game Boy in 1992
Saint Seiya: Typing Ryu Sei Ken	Japan, December 19, 2002 (PC)	—N/a	—N/a
Notes: Educational game released only in Japan in 2002
Saint Seiya: Ōgon Densetsu Hen Perfect Edition	Japan, July 31, 2003 (Wonderswan Color)	—N/a	—N/a
Notes: An enhanced port of Saint Seiya: Ōgon Densetsu; The story covers the first 73 episodes of the original anime series; The game earned a score of 19/40 from the Japanese magazine Famitsu
Saint Seiya: The Sanctuary	Japan, April 7, 2005 (PlayStation 2)	—N/a	Europe, June 30, 2005 (PlayStation 2)
Notes: 3D fighting game that adapts the same episodes as the previous game, with characters from the first series of the classic series of Saint Seiya
Saint Seiya: The Hades	Japan, February 1, 2007 (PlayStation 2)	—N/a	Europe, September 29, 2006 (PlayStation 2)
Notes: Sequel to Saint Seiya: The Sanctuary; The game adapts the original video animation series concerning the plot surrounding Hades; Released in Europe and Australia in 2006 and in Japan in 2007
Saint Seiya: Sanctuary Battle	Japan, November 23, 2011 (PlayStation 3)	—N/a	Europe, March 16, 2012 (PlayStation 3)
Notes: Beat 'em up game originally released in Japan as Saint Seiya Senki; Released in Europe and Australia in 2012; Released in Latin America as Los Caballeros del Zodiaco: Batalla por el Santuario (Spanish-speaking countries) and Os Cavaleiros do Zodíaco: Batalha do Santuário (Brazil)
Saint Seiya Omega: Ultimate Cosmo	Japan, November 29, 2012 (PSP)	—N/a	—N/a
Notes: Fighting game released only in Japan for the PlayStation Portable; Based on the Saint Seiya Omega anime
Saint Seiya Online	Japan, 2013 (PC)	—N/a	—N/a
Notes: The game was first shown to be in production on July 14, 2006 on Masami Kurumada's blog, but it was not until November 7, 2008 that more information was released about the title, including a picture from the game with the five main Bronze Saints in their original colors; The title was to be released originally in August 2009 by Sega Japan and Perfect World Beijing, but the release was delayed; Open beta testing of the game began on May 16, 2013 only in China; the game was discontinued in China on December 31, 2018; Saint Seiya Online features a 65-piece orchestral music score composed by Masamichi Amano and performed by the Angel City Studio Orchestra; Recording took place at the Eastwood Scoring Stage at Warner Brothers Studios; The game was announced by Sega and Perfect World that it'll see a release in South Korea in 2015; The game was officially made available in Brazil on September 25, 2017
Saint Seiya: Brave Soldiers	Japan, October 17, 2013 (PlayStation 3)	United States, November 26, 2013 (PlayStation 3)	Europe, November 22, 2013 (PlayStation 3)
Notes: The story covers all three major acts in Kurumada's original manga: the Twelve Temples arc, the Poseidon arc and the Hades arc; Released in South Korea on October 17, 2013; Released in Brazil as Os Cavaleiros do Zodíaco: Bravos Soldados
Saint Seiya: Soldiers' Soul	Japan, September 25, 2015 (PlayStation 4)	United States, October 6, 2015 (PlayStation 4)	Europe, September 25, 2015 (PlayStation 4)
Notes: Originally released for PlayStation 3 and PlayStation 4 in September 2015; Ported to personal computers and released on November 27, 2015; The game features characters of the classic series Saint Seiya and Soul of Gold; Released in Latin America as Los Caballeros del Zodiaco: Alma de Soldados and in Brazil as Os Cavaleiros do Zodíaco: Alma dos Soldados

== Mobile games ==
All of these video games are based on the 1986 classic series Saint Seiya:

- Saint Seiya Cosmo Slottle, released on January 10, 2014, by Namco Bandai for iOS platforms only in Japan, and later released for Android compatible devices. The events are based on the classic series, and the game offers slot-machine and pachinko gameplay. The plot covers the Galaxian Wars arc and the Twelve Temples arc as interpreted by the anime adaptation.
- Saint Seiya: Big Bang Cosmo, a trading card game released on April 1, 2014, for Yahoo's and DeNA's mobile phone game portal, Mobage. Support for the game ended in 2017.
- Saint Seiya Sugo-waza Party Battle, an action role-playing game released on June 16, 2016, for Android and iOS devices in Japan.
- Saint Seiya: Cosmo Fantasy – Knights of the Zodiac, an action role-playing game initially released on January 29, 2016, for Android and iOS devices in Japan as Saint Seiya: Zodiac Brave. The game features characters from the classic manga series and was released worldwide in English in 2017. Support ended after July 28, 2022.
- Saint Seiya: Galaxy Spirits, an action role-playing game, originally released in 2016 and released globally on May 13, 2019, for Android devices.
- Saint Seiya: Awakening (originally released as Saint Seiya Tencent in 2017), a role-playing game released globally in June 2019.
- Saint Seiya: Shining Soldiers, a fighting game focusing on PvP battles, released in 2020. Support ended after January 2021.
- Saint Seiya: Legend of Justice, a role-playing game released in 2022 for Android and iOS devices.

== Related games ==
=== Crossovers ===
The following games feature characters from the 1986 classic series Saint Seiya:

- Famicom Jump: Hero Retsuden (Famicom, 1988)
- Cult Jump (Game Boy, 1993; Quiz game in Japanese with questions about the original Saint Seiya manga)
- Pop'n Music Animation Melody (Arcade, PlayStation, Game Boy Color, 2000)
- Pop'n Music Animelo 2 (Arcade, 2001)
- Karaoke Revolution Anime Song Selection (PlayStation 2, 2003; "Pegasus Fantasy" is one of the songs featured in the game)
- Jump! Ultimate Stars (Nintendo DS, 2006)
- Taiko no Tatsujin (Arcade, 2011) - The music track Pegasus Fantasy is part of the C/N: KATSU-DON update released in July 2012, as well as Sorairo Version from March 2013, Momoiro Version from December 2013, Kimidori Version from July 2014, and Murasaki Version from March 2015. The song is also featured in the following games in the series:
  - Taiko no Tatsujin Plus (Android, iOS, 2010; Pegasus Fantasy was included in the Popular Song Pack 9, in November 2012)
  - Taiko no Tatsujin: Portable DX (PSP, 2011; Pegasus Fantasy was made available as a downloadable song in November 2012)
  - Taiko no Tatsujin: Shinkyoku Tori Houdai! (Android, 2012)
  - Taiko no Tatsujin Plus: Shinkyoku Tori Houdai! (Android, iOS, 2016)
- J Legend Retsuden (Nintendo 3DS, 2013; Compilation of Famicom games that includes Ougon Densetsu and Ougon Densetsu Kanketsu-hen)
- LINE Rangers (Android, 2014; Four Bronze Saints and two Gold Saints appeared for a limited time in February 2018)
- J-Stars Victory VS (PlayStation 3, PlayStation Vita, 2014)
- Jumputi Heroes (Android, iOS, 2014)
- Puzzle & Dragons (Android, iOS, 2014; Pegasus Seiya, Dragon Shiryu, Cygnus Hyoga, Andromeda Shun, and Phoenix Ikki were added in a collaboration to promote the release of the film Saint Seiya: Legend of Sanctuary)
- J-Stars Victory VS+ (PlayStation 3, PlayStation Vita, PlayStation 4, 2015)
- Mobile Legends: Bang Bang (Android, iOS, 2016; A MLBB × Saint Seiya collaboration in October 2022 featured a number of Gold Cloths and Bronze Cloths)
- Monster Strike (Android, 2016; Featured Saint Seiya characters during the collaboration event Saint Seiya × Monster Strike)
- Weekly Shōnen Jump: Ore Collection! (Android, iOS, 2017; A card RPG game featuring different characters from Shōnen Jump, including the five main Bronze Saints)
- Weekly Shōnen Jump Jikkyō Janjan Stadium (Android, iOS, 2018)
- Jump Force (Xbox One, PlayStation 4, PC, Nintendo Switch, 2019)
- Jump Hero Taisen: Ore Collection 2 (Android, iOS, 2019; A turn-based RPG featuring Pegasus Seiya as one of the playable characters)

=== LCD games ===
LCD games were released in Japan and Italy featuring characters from Saint Seiya.

- Saint Seiya: Explode, Pegasus Ryu Sei Ken (Japan, 1987)
- Saint Seiya: Sanctuary Armagedon (Japan, 1988)
- Saint Seiya: Burn! Seven Senses (Japan, 1988)
- Saint Paradise: 12 Kyū Saigo no Seisen (Japan, 1992)
- I Cavalieri dello Zodiaco: Electronic Game (Italy, 2001)
- I Cavalieri dello Zodiaco: Il Duello Decisivo (Italy, 2008)

=== Pachinko ===
Several pachinko and pachislot machines have been released featuring themes based on the original 1986 Saint Seiya .

- CR Saint Seiya Ōgon (2011)
- CR Saint Seiya Seidō (2011)
- CR Saint Seiya 99 Version (2012)
- Pachisuro Saint Seiya (2012)
- CR Saint Seiya: Hoshi no Unmei (2013)
- CR Saint Seiya: Hoshi no Unmei 77 Version (2014)
- CR Saint Seiya: Hoshi no Unmei 99 Version (2014)
- Pachisuro Saint Seiya Ōgon: Gekitō Hen (2014)
- Pachisuro Saint Seiya: Megami Seisen (2015)
- CR Saint Seiya: Beyond the Limit MLA (2015)
- CR Saint Seiya: Beyond the Limit XLA (2015)
- CR Saint Seiya: Beyond the Limit ZLA (2015)
- CR Saint Seiya: Beyond the Limit ZLB (2015)
- CRA Saint Seiya: Beyond the Limit 99 Version (2016)
- Pachisuro Saint Seiya: Kaikō Kakusei (2017)
- CR Saint Seiya 4: The Battle of Genkai Toppa (2018)
- Pachisuro Saint Seiya: Kaikō Kakusei Special (2019)
- PA Saint Seiya 4: The Battle of Genkai Toppa (2019)
- S Saint Seiya: Meiō Fukkatsu (2022)
- P Saint Seiya: Chōryūsei Seiya Gold ver. 92% (2022)
- P Saint Seiya: Chōryūsei Megami Gold ver. 1500 (2022)
- e Saint Seiya: Chōryūsei CliMAX 349 (2023)
- P Saint Seiya: Chōryūsei LIGHT (2023)
- L Saint Seiya: Kaikō Kakusei Custom Edition (2024)
