= Rumble Fish (disambiguation) =

Rumble Fish is a 1983 film.

Rumble Fish or Rumblefish may also refer to:

- Rumble Fish (novel), a 1975 novel by S. E. Hinton; basis for the film
- The Rumble Fish, a 2004 2D fighting video game
  - The Rumble Fish 2, a 2005 sequel to the above

== Music ==
- Rumblefish (band), a UK pop band formed in 1986
- Rumble Fish (band), a Korean rock group
- Rumble Fish (singer) (born 1982), South Korean singer-songwriter
- Rumblefish Inc., a music licensing company
- "Rumble Fish" (song), a 2000 song by Do As Infinity
- "Rumblefish", a 1994 song by The Goats from No Goats, No Glory
- "Rumble Fish", a 1999 song by Sevendust from the album Home
- "Rumblefish", a 2000 song by Bonnie Pink from the album Let Go
- "Rumblefish", nickname of the music producer Tom Gilles, a co-founder of Big Blue Meenie Recording Studio

== See also ==
- Siamese fighting fish, a popular fish in the aquarium trade
