= List of best-selling Game Boy Advance video games =

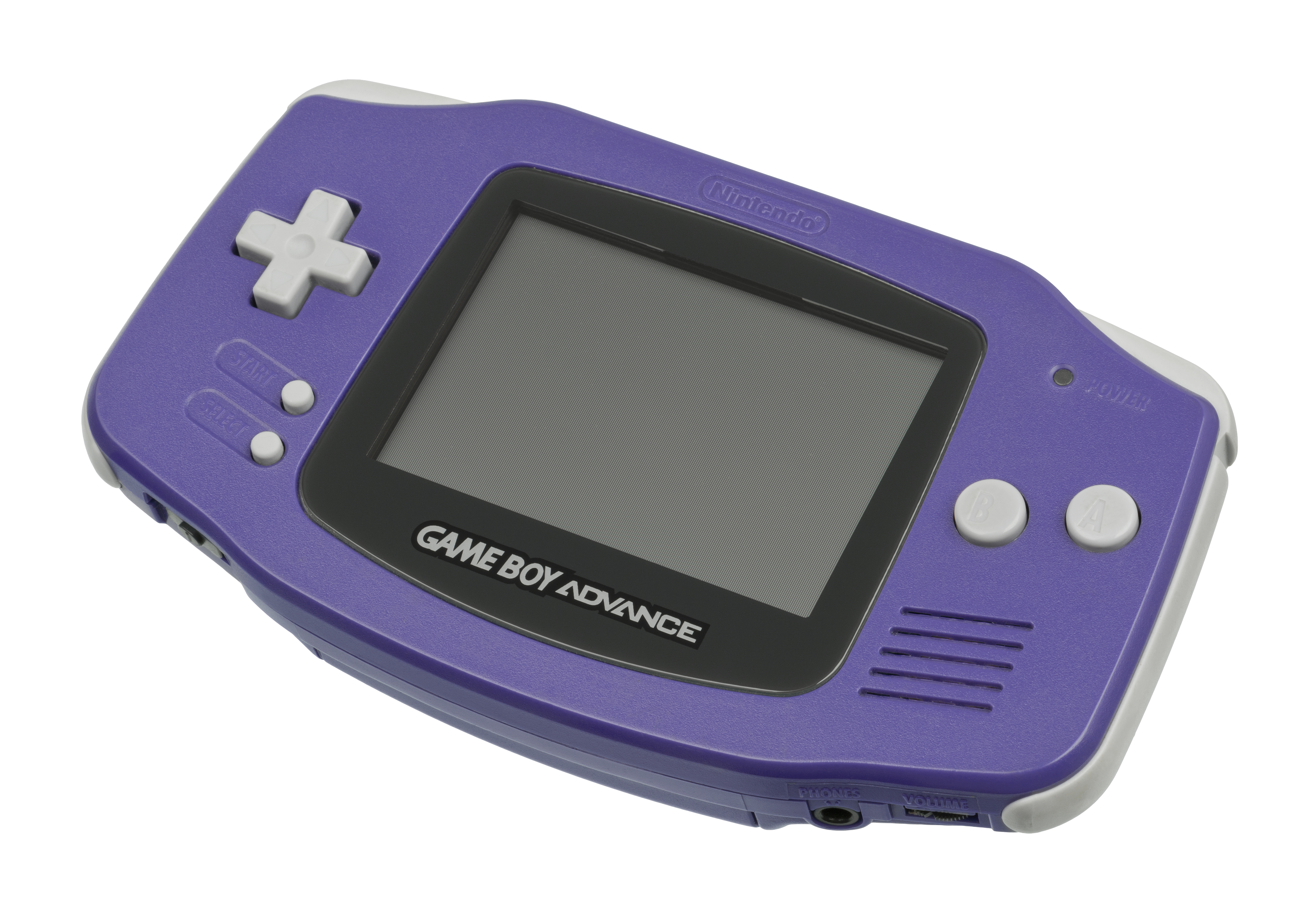
Game Boy Advance

This is a list of video games for the Game Boy Advance video game console that have sold or shipped at least one million copies. The best-selling games on the Game Boy Advance are Pokémon Ruby and Sapphire. First released in Japan on November 21, 2002, they went on to sell over 16 million units worldwide. Pokémon FireRed and LeafGreen, enhanced remakes of the original Pokémon Red, Green and Blue games, are the second-best-selling games on the platform with sales in excess of 12 million units combined. Pokémon Emerald, an enhanced version of Ruby and Sapphire, is third with sales of more than 7 million units. The top five is rounded out by Mario Kart: Super Circuit and Super Mario World: Super Mario Advance 2, each of which sold over 5.5 million units.

There are a total of 40 Game Boy Advance games on this list which are confirmed to have sold or shipped at least one million units. Of these, eleven were developed internally by Nintendo development divisions. Other developers with the most million-selling games include Game Freak with three games, and HAL Laboratory and Flagship, with two games each. Of the 40 games on this list, 25 were published in one or more regions by Nintendo. Other publishers with multiple million-selling games include The Pokémon Company with five games, THQ with three games, and Konami and Namco with two games each. The most popular franchises on Game Boy Advance include Pokémon (over 39 million combined units) and Super Mario (16.69 million combined units).

== List ==
Key
†	Game was bundled with Game Boy Advance consoles during its lifetime

Game	Developer(s) (Note: Only developers and publishers for the original release of each game are listed.)	Publisher(s)	Release date (Note: Only the initial release date on this platform is listed.)	Sales	Ref.
Pokémon Ruby and Sapphire	Game Freak	The Pokémon Company; Nintendo	November 21, 2002	16,220,000	
Pokémon FireRed and LeafGreen	Game Freak	The Pokémon Company; Nintendo	January 24, 2004	12,000,000	
Pokémon Emerald	Game Freak	The Pokémon Company; Nintendo	September 16, 2004	6,800,000	
Mario Kart: Super Circuit	Intelligent Systems	Nintendo	July 21, 2001	5,910,000	
Super Mario World: Super Mario Advance 2	Nintendo R&D2	Nintendo	December 14, 2001	5,690,000	
Super Mario Advance	Nintendo R&D2	Nintendo	March 21, 2001	5,570,000	
Super Mario Advance 4: Super Mario Bros. 3 †	Nintendo R&D2	Nintendo	July 11, 2003	5,430,000	
Namco Museum	Mass Media Games	Namco	June 11, 2001	2,960,000	
Pac-Man Collection	Mass Media Games	Namco	July 12, 2001	2,940,000	
Yoshi's Island: Super Mario Advance 3	Nintendo R&D2	Nintendo	September 23, 2002	2,830,000	
The Legend of Zelda: A Link to the Past	Nintendo EAD; Flagship	Nintendo	December 2, 2002	2,820,000	
Pokémon Mystery Dungeon: Red Rescue Team	Chunsoft	The Pokémon Company; Nintendo	November 17, 2005	2,360,000	
Classic NES Series: Super Mario Bros.	Nintendo EAD	Nintendo	February 14, 2004	2,270,000	
Wario Land 4	Nintendo R&D1	Nintendo	August 21, 2001	2,200,000	
Mario & Luigi: Superstar Saga	AlphaDream	Nintendo	November 17, 2003	2,150,000	
Kirby: Nightmare in Dream Land	HAL Laboratory	Nintendo	October 25, 2002	2,100,000	
Finding Nemo	Vicarious Visions	THQ	May 10, 2003	1,840,000	
Donkey Kong Country	Rare	Nintendo	June 6, 2003	1,820,000	
The Legend of Zelda: The Minish Cap	Flagship	Nintendo	November 4, 2004	1,760,000	
Yu-Gi-Oh! The Eternal Duelist Soul	Konami	Konami	July 5, 2001	1,710,534	(Note: 410,534 in Japan. 1.3 million in the United States.)
Frogger's Adventures: Temple of the Frog	Konami Software Shanghai	Konami	November 23, 2001	1,700,000	
Golden Sun	Camelot Software Planning	Nintendo	August 1, 2001	1,650,000	
Final Fantasy Tactics Advance	Square	JP: Square; WW: Nintendo	February 14, 2003	1,621,000	
Metroid Fusion	Nintendo R&D1	Nintendo	November 17, 2002	1,600,000	
Kingdom Hearts: Chain of Memories	Square Enix; Jupiter	Square Enix	November 11, 2004	1,542,000	
Sonic Advance	Dimps; Sonic Team	JP: Sega; NA: THQ; EU: Infogrames	December 20, 2001	1,515,000	
Kirby & the Amazing Mirror	HAL Laboratory; Flagship (Note: Kirby & the Amazing Mirror features additional development by Dimps.)	Nintendo	April 15, 2004	1,470,000	
Yu-Gi-Oh! Worldwide Edition: Stairway to the Destined Duel	Konami	Konami	April 15, 2003	1,460,000	
Dragon Ball Z: The Legacy of Goku	Webfoot Technologies	Infogrames	May 14, 2002	1,400,000	
Mario vs. Donkey Kong	Nintendo Software Technology	Nintendo	May 24, 2004	1,370,000	
Pokémon Pinball: Ruby & Sapphire	Jupiter	The Pokémon Company; Nintendo	August 1, 2003	1,370,000	
The Incredibles	Helixe	THQ	November 1, 2004	1,366,000	
Mega Man Battle Network 4: Red Sun and Blue Moon	Capcom Production Studio 2	Capcom	December 14, 2003	1,350,000	
Harry Potter and the Chamber of Secrets	Eurocom	Electronic Arts	November 5, 2002	1,200,000	
Disney Princess	Art Co., Ltd	THQ	April 2, 2003	1,170,000	
Golden Sun: The Lost Age	Camelot Software Planning	Nintendo	June 28, 2002	1,120,000	
WarioWare, Inc.: Mega Microgames!	Nintendo R&D1	Nintendo	March 21, 2003	1,100,000	
F-Zero: Maximum Velocity	NDcube	Nintendo	March 21, 2001	1,050,000	
Sonic Advance 2	Dimps; Sonic Team	JP: Sega; NA: THQ; EU: Infogrames	December 19, 2002	1,016,541	
Spyro: Season of Ice	Digital Eclipse	Universal Interactive Studios	October 29, 2001	1,000,000	

== See also ==
- List of best-selling Nintendo video games
