= Atomiswave =

Arcade game system by Sammy Corporation

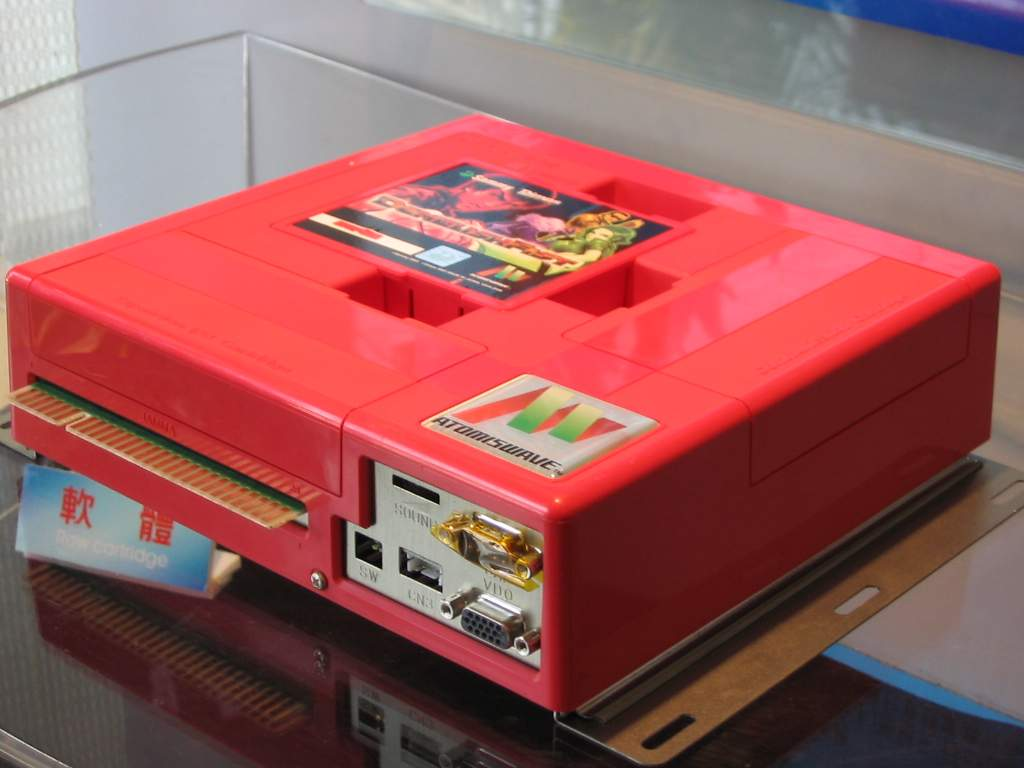
- An Atomiswave arcade board, with a game cartridge installed. There are detachable panels on the front and right of the board.
- Developer: Sammy Corporation
- Discontinued: March 31, 2017 (technical support)
- CPU: SH-4 @ 200 MHz
- Memory: 16 MB
- Graphics: PowerVR 2 @ 100MHz
- Sound: ARM7 Yamaha AICA @ 45 MHz
- Connectivity: AW-Net

The Atomiswave is a custom arcade system board and cabinet from Sammy Corporation. It is based on Sega's Dreamcast console, sharing similarities with the NAOMI, as far as it uses interchangeable game cartridges, as well as a removable module for changing the control scheme (including dual joysticks, dual light guns and a steering wheel), but unlike the NAOMI, the Atomiswave does not feature expanded RAM compared to the Dreamcast.

With the retirement of the aging Neo Geo MVS system, SNK Playmore chose the Atomiswave as its next system to develop games for. In a contract with Sammy, SNK Playmore agreed to develop five games for the Atomiswave system. Metal Slug 6 was SNK Playmore's fifth game for the Atomiswave, after which SNK moved on to a Taito Type X2 arcade board. Sega ended technical support for the system and its games on March 31, 2017. Since its discontinuation, the Atomiswave library has received homebrew conversions to the Dreamcast.

== Specifications ==
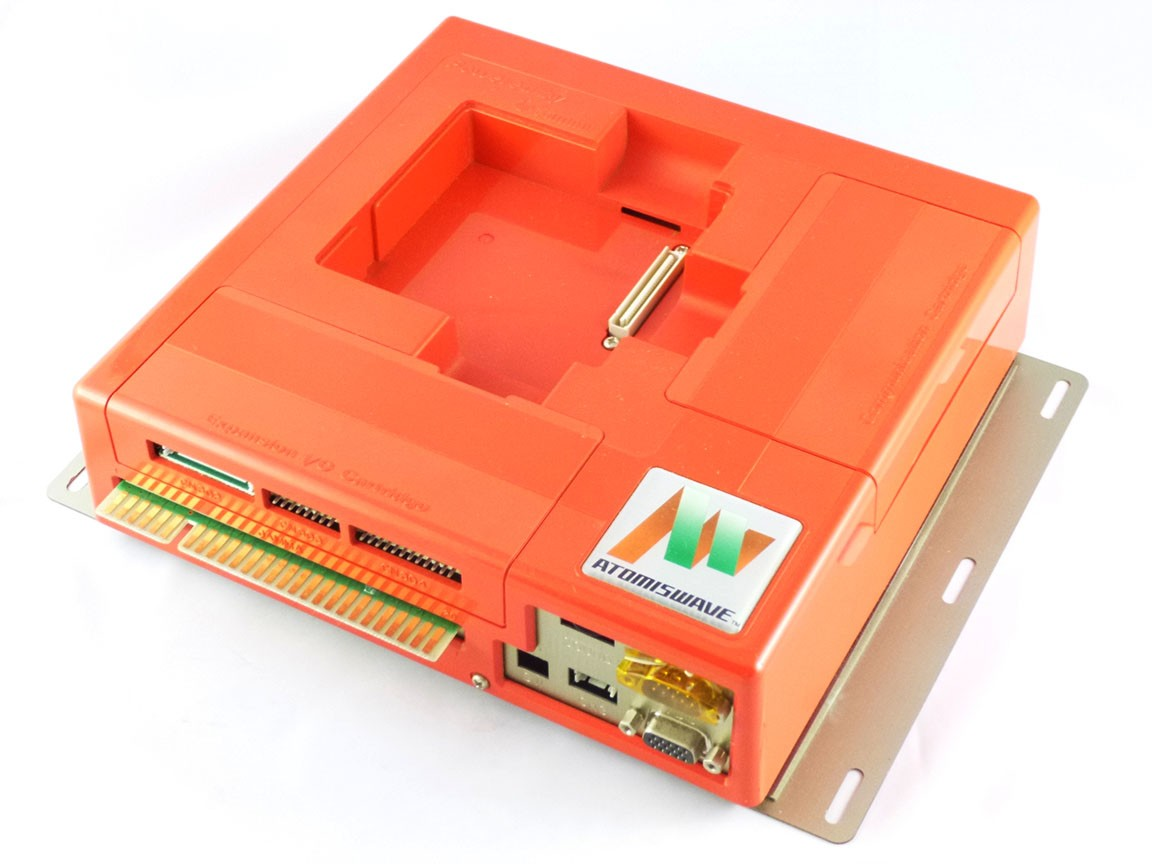
An Atomiswave arcade board without a game cartridge, and with an Expansion I/O cartridge for input devices and other peripherals in place of a detachable panel in the front of the board. A communication cartridge could also be installed on the right of the board, replacing the detachable panel.

- CPU: Hitachi SH-4 32-bit RISC CPU 200 MHz
  - Rated performance: 360 MIPS/1.4 GFLOPS
- Graphics processor: PowerVR 2 100 MHz
  - Polygon performance: 3 to 5 million polygons/sec
  - Rendering speed: 500 M pixels/sec
  - Additional features: bump mapping, fog, alpha-blending (transparency), MIP mapping (polygon-texture auto switch), tri-*linear filtering, anti-aliasing, environment mapping, and specular effect
- Sound processor: ARM7 Yamaha AICA (with internal 32-bit RISC CPU, 64 channel ADPCM) 45 MHz
- Memory
  - System: 16 MB
  - Graphics: 8 MB
  - Sound: 2 MB
- Storage media: ROM board

== AW-net ==
In Japan, the Atomiswave was able to connect via a special modem to the AW-Net online system set up by Sammy. The AW-Net was primarily used to play online with other players and to create online player rankings. AW-Net was discontinued on 30 November 2006 following the merger of Sammy and Sega; the follow-up system was ALL.Net.

== Games ==
The games were developed for the system by several companies, including Arc System Works (founded by ex-Sega employees), Dimps (founded by ex-Capcom and SNK employees), and Sega Amusements USA (formerly Sammy USA Corporation).

=== Released ===
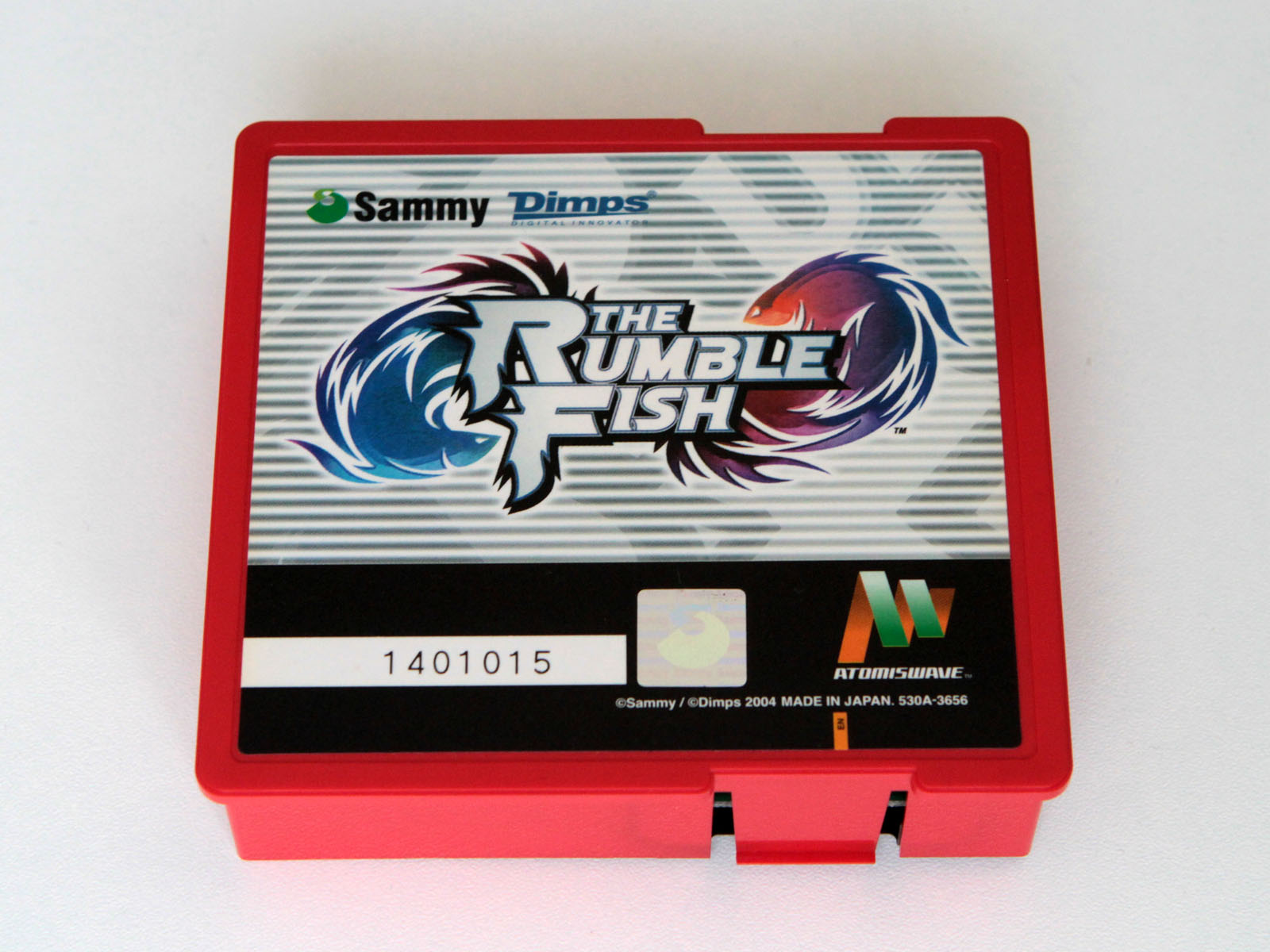
An Atomiswave game cartridge which contains a ROM board

Title	Publisher/Developer	Genre	Year
Animal Basket (Japan: Hustle Tamaire Kyousou)	Sammy, Moss	Sports	2005
Block Pong Pong	Sammy, Moss	Sports	2005
Demolish Fist	Sammy, Dimps	Beat 'em up	2003
Dirty Pigskin Football	Sammy USA Corporation, Play Mechanix	Sports	2006
Dolphin Blue	Sammy	Platformer	2003
Extreme Hunting	Sammy USA Corporation	Lightgun shooter	2005
Extreme Hunting 2 Tournament Edition	Sega Amusements USA	Lightgun shooter	2006
Faster Than Speed	Sammy, WOW Entertainment	Racing	2004
Fist of the North Star (Japan: Hokuto No Ken)	Sega, Arc System Works	Fighting	2005
Guilty Gear Isuka	Sammy, Arc System Works	Fighting	2003
Guilty Gear X Version 1.5	Sammy, Arc System Works	Fighting	2003
The King of Fighters Neowave	Sammy, SNK Playmore	Fighting	2004
The King of Fighters XI	Sega, SNK Playmore	Fighting	2005
Knights of Valour: The Seven Spirits	Sammy, IGS	Beat 'em up	2003
Maximum Speed	Sammy, SIMS	Racing	2003
Metal Slug 6	Sega, SNK Playmore	Platformer	2006
Miracle Stadium	Sammy, Moss	Sports	2005
NeoGeo Battle Coliseum	Sega, SNK Playmore	Fighting	2005
Net Select Keiba Victory Furlong	Sammy	Sports	2005
Net Select Salary Man Kintarou	Sammy	Mahjong	2004
Ranger Mission	Sammy, RIZ Inc.	Lightgun shooter	2004
The Rumble Fish	Sammy, Dimps	Fighting	2004
The Rumble Fish 2	Sammy, Dimps	Fighting	2005
Samurai Spirits: Tenkaichi Kenkakuden	Sega, SNK Playmore	Fighting	2005
Sega Bass Fishing Challenge	Sega Amusements USA	Sports	2009
Sega Clay Challenge	Sega Amusements USA	Lightgun shooter	2008
Sports Shooting USA	Sammy USA Corporation	Lightgun shooter	2003
Wai Wai Drive	Sammy, Moss	Driving	2005

=== Unreleased ===
- Sushi Bar (Sammy, 2003)
- Premier Eleven (Sammy/Dimps, 2003)
- Chicago 1929/Chase 1929 (Sammy, 2004)
- Force Five (Sammy, 2004)
- Kenju (Sammy/DreamFactory, 2004)
