= Sonic Advance =

2001 platform game

- Developers: Dimps; Sonic Team; Gameloft (J2ME)
- Publisher: Sega: NA: THQ (GBA); Gameloft (J2ME)
- Director: Akinori Nishiyama
- Producers: Yuji Naka; Hiroshi Matsumoto
- Designers: Yukihiro Higashi; Masaaki Yamagiwa
- Programmers: Yoshihisa Hashimoto; Takaaki Saito
- Artist: Yuji Uekawa
- Composers: Tatsuyuki Maeda; Yutaka Minobe
- Series: Sonic the Hedgehog
- Platforms: Game Boy Advance, N-Gage, Android, mobile phone
- Release: Game Boy Advance: JP: December 20, 2001; NA: February 3, 2002; EU: March 8, 2002; N-Gage: WW: October 7, 2003; Android: JP: November 25, 2011; J2ME: WW: 2011
- Genre: Platform
- Modes: Single-player, multiplayer

Sonic Advance (Note: Japanese: ソニックアドバンス, Hepburn: Sonikku Adobansu) is a 2001 platform game developed by Sonic Team and Dimps and published by Sega for the Game Boy Advance. It was one of the first Sonic the Hedgehog games to be released on a Nintendo console along with Sonic Adventure 2: Battle on the GameCube, and was produced in commemoration of the series' tenth anniversary. The story follows Sonic, Tails, Knuckles, and Amy as they journey to stop Doctor Eggman from taking over the world. Controlling a character, players are tasked with completing each level, defeating Eggman and his robot army, and collecting the seven Chaos Emeralds.

Development began after Sega shifted its focus to third-party software development, due to the poor performance of the Dreamcast console. Sega recruited Dimps to lead development, making the game the first in the franchise developed by the studio. While Sonic Advance follows a similar style of gameplay to the Sega Genesis Sonic games, certain concepts and designs were reused from newer games such as Sonic Adventure (1998). The game was ported to Nokia's N-Gage in 2003 as SonicN, with ports to J2ME devices by Gameloft and Android by Sega releasing in 2011. The GBA version was re-released on the Wii U's Virtual Console in Japan.

Sonic Advance received positive reviews for its graphics, character animations, and faithfulness to the original Genesis games, but also received criticism for its short length and special stages. It was a commercial success, selling 1.21 million copies in the United States and is among the GBA's bestselling games. The game was followed by two sequels also on the Game Boy Advance; Sonic Advance 2 (2002) and Sonic Advance 3 (2004).

== Gameplay ==
Sonic running through a loop in Angel Island Zone

Sonic Advance is a side-scrolling platform game reminiscent of the original Sonic the Hedgehog games released for the Sega Genesis. Players journey through an island to defeat Doctor Eggman, who is attempting to capture its animal population to turn them into evil robots. Players select one of four characters, each with their own unique set of moves. Sonic the Hedgehog is fastest and can perform an "insta-shield" that protects him for a moment; Tails can fly or swim for a short time; Knuckles the Echidna can glide through the air, swim above water for a few seconds and climb walls; and Amy Rose can destroy enemies using a hammer. Except for Amy, each character can defeat enemy robots by jumping and curling into a ball, or by performing a spin dash on the ground to gain speed. By entering a cheat code, players can control Sonic while Tails runs alongside him, similar to Sonic the Hedgehog 2 (1992).

The game takes place over six levels called zones. Each zone is split into two acts, where the player must guide their selected character past enemies and obstacles such as spikes and bottomless pits to reach the end in under ten minutes. Scattered around acts are springboards, boost pads, and golden rings, which serve as a form of health; players survive hits as long as they have at least one ring, but their rings will scatter and disappear after a short period. Players collect canisters that contain power-ups such as speed shoes, elemental shields, and invincibility. The first act ends when players pass a signpost, and the second culminates in a boss fight with Eggman; after hitting him eight times, Eggman will flee and drop a capsule of captured animals. Each character starts the game with a number of lives, which are lost when they are hit with no rings in their possession, crushed, drown, fall in a bottomless pit, or exceed an act's 10-minute limit. The game ends when the player runs out of lives, although they can retry the current act from the beginning if they have any continues.

Special springs can be found near the top of certain acts. By jumping on them, the player can reach a special stage, where they are sent down a tube to collect rings. If they collect enough rings, the player receives a Chaos Emerald. Collecting all seven Emeralds unlocks an extra boss fight. The game also features a minigame, Tiny Chao Garden, where players can raise Chao. Players can transfer their Chao between the Tiny Chao Garden and the Chao Garden from the GameCube versions of Sonic Adventure and Sonic Adventure 2. The game also features a competitive multiplayer mode, where up to four owners of the game can race to the end of a level or search for Chao.

== Development and release ==
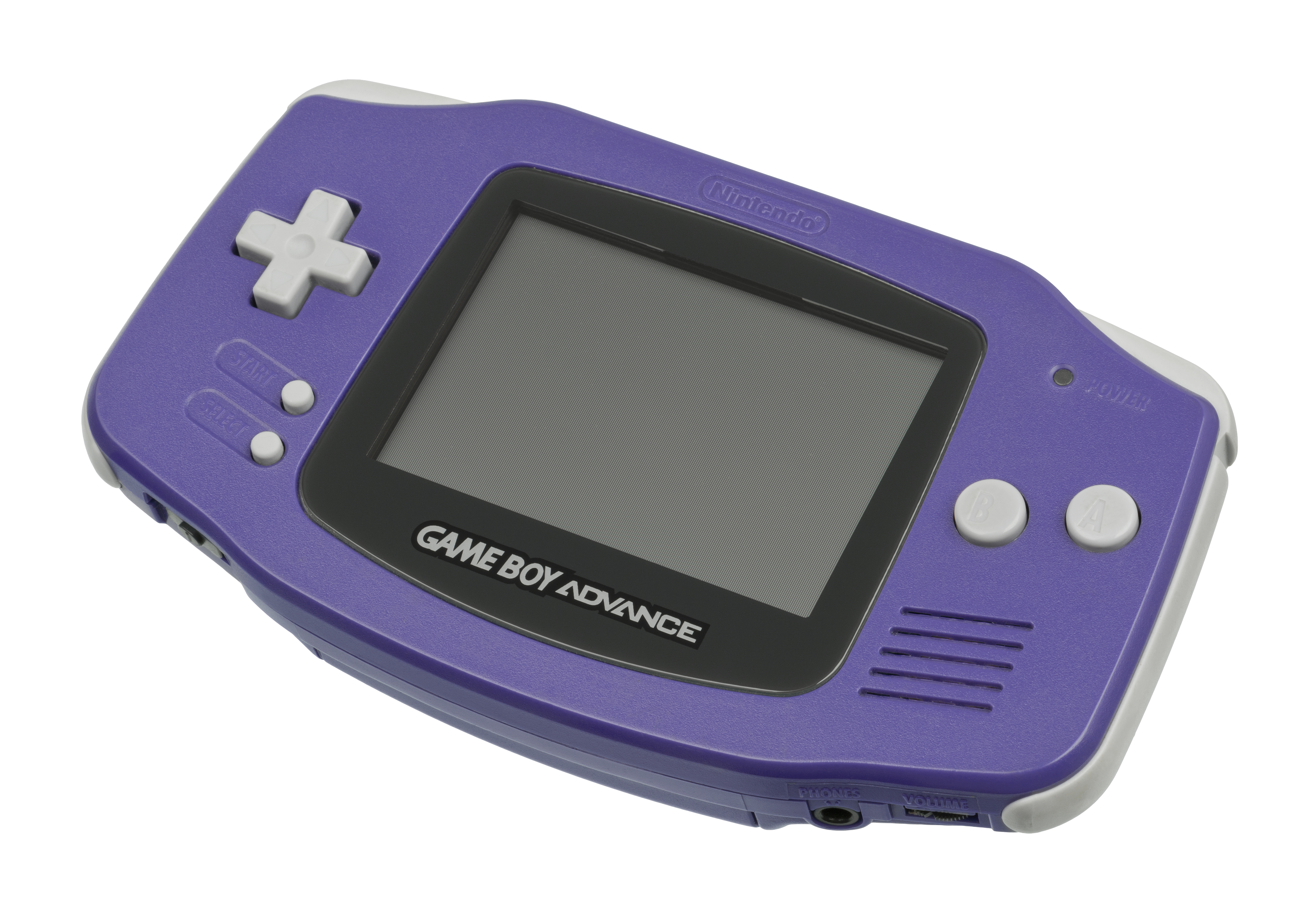
Sonic Advance was developed for Nintendo's Game Boy Advance handheld console.

In January 2001, Sega, facing financial troubles with the underperformance of its Dreamcast console, shifted from first to third-party software publishing, with Sony Computer Entertainment's PlayStation 2 and Nintendo's Game Boy Advance (GBA) being primary focuses. A team of developers was formed to begin development on Sonic the Hedgehog Advance (later renamed Sonic Advance), a Sonic game for the GBA to commemorate the series' 10th anniversary. Dimps, a studio formed by several former Neo Geo Pocket Color developers and funded by Sega, Sony, and Bandai, developed the game with assistance from Sonic Team. Sonic Team conceived the game, but was understaffed on employees familiar with the GBA hardware and so recruited Dimps. Several Dimps members worked on the critically acclaimed Sonic the Hedgehog Pocket Adventure (1999) for the Neo Geo Pocket Color.

The developers decided to return to a gameplay style similar to the original Genesis Sonic games, which Naka felt was refreshing. Despite this, they also incorporated concepts from Sonic Adventure (1998) and Sonic Adventure 2 (2001), such as the ability to grind on rails and the modernized character designs by Yuji Uekawa. As the Sonic games released for the Dreamcast allowed players to download minigames onto the Visual Memory Unit (VMU), the development team decided to expand upon this by using a similar concept with the GameCube's GBA link cable, making Sonic Advance one of the first games to use the cable.

Sega announced Sonic Advance alongside two other GBA games on January 30, 2001. (Note: The others were rereleases of ChuChu Rocket! (1999) and Puyo Puyo (1991)) A video containing footage of the game's first level was featured at the Electronic Entertainment Expo (E3) in May 2001, and demo versions were showcased at Nintendo Space World and the Tokyo Game Show later that year. Sega released Sonic Advance in Japan on December 20, 2001, while THQ co-published it in North America on February 4, 2002. The game was released in Europe on March 8, 2002, where Infogrames handled marketing and distribution. A port for Nokia's N-Gage, SonicN, was released worldwide on October 7, 2003. In 2005, it was compiled with ChuChu Rocket!, Sonic Pinball Party, and Sonic Battle in separate bundle packs for the GBA. The game was released on Android on November 25, 2011, and on the Wii U's Virtual Console on February 18, 2015. Both of these rereleases are exclusive to Japan. A J2ME mobile port version of the game was developed and released worldwide by Gameloft in 2011, which contains only four Zones: Neo Green Hill Zone, Secret Base Zone, Angel Island Zone and Casino Paradise.

== Reception ==
Reception

Aggregate score
Aggregator	Score
Metacritic	87/100

Review scores
Publication	Score
AllGame	4/5
Electronic Gaming Monthly	8/10, 7/10, 8/10
Famitsu	8/10, 8/10, 8/10, 8/10
Game Informer	8.5/10
GamePro	17/20
GameSpot	7.9/10
IGN	9.1/10
Nintendo Life	8/10
Nintendo World Report	8/10
X-Play	4/5

Sonic Advance received "generally favorable reviews", according to review aggregation website Metacritic. The game sold 1.21 million copies in the United States, making it one of the bestselling games for the GBA. It earned $36 million by August 2006. During the period between January 2000 and August 2006, it was the 12th highest-selling game launched for the GBA, Nintendo DS or PlayStation Portable in the United States.

The game's presentation was well received. Chris Johnston of Electronic Gaming Monthly (EGM) and Matthew Keil of Extended Play called Sonic Advance the best-looking 2D Sonic game, and Matt Helgeson of Game Informer regarded it as better-looking than the series' Sega Genesis entries. Ricardo Torres of GameSpot praised its detailed scenery and animation, describing them as solid and faithful to the original Genesis games. Michael Cole of Nintendo World Report described its use of graphical techniques as elegant, praising its anime-inspired character animations, and compared them positively to the critically acclaimed Super Nintendo Entertainment System game Super Mario World (1990). The game's music and audio was also praised; Torres called it comfortable and catchy. Reviewers also praised the gameplay, with many comparing it favorably to the original games. Craig Harris of IGN wrote the game's new ideas, such as the ability to grind on rails, were clever and determined that Sonic felt better on the GBA than on the Genesis. Skyler Miller of AllGame said the game relied too much on nostalgia, but felt it was still a "winning formula" and called the game enjoyable. The game's use of the GameCube link cable was praised; Harris noted the replay value and variety it offered, and Torres called it interesting, and felt it made good use of the GBA's connectivity to the GameCube. Overall, reviewers felt Sonic Advance was a solid addition to the Sonic franchise. Cole felt the game was not perfect, but was still a game that "deserves a spot in your GBA case". Harris agreed, and stated the game successfully recaptured the spirit of classic Sonic gameplay while feeling unique and taking advantage of the GBA's capabilities.

Certain elements received more mixed responses. Torres felt that Sonic Advance lacked polish, and criticized the difficult special stages. Harris's only criticism was the presence of problems from earlier games, such as "an inviting stretch of roadway that begs to have your character blaze across it at top speed, only to have a spike strip jab you in the feet somewhere in the middle". Helgeson and Cole thought the game was too short, and Cole criticized the exclusion of the Super Sonic replay mode from earlier games. Greg Sewart of EGM similarly thought the game had too few levels, and deemed the multiplayer games insufficiently compelling for sustained interest. Keil considered the game too easy, supposing that experienced Sonic players would finish it on their first attempt. He added that the Chao Garden mode was initially a fun diversion, but quickly grew tedious.

Reviews for the N-Gage version were mixed; Alex Navarro of GameSpot criticized its choppy frame rate and encouraged readers to buy the superior GBA version instead. Chadd Chambers of IGN agreed and felt the N-Gage's vertical screen and omission of the multiplayer modes had a negative impact on the ported version.

== Legacy ==
In 2009, Official Nintendo Magazine named Sonic Advance among the best games for Nintendo consoles. Later that year, they ranked the game 75th on a list of greatest Nintendo games, calling it "the finest Sonic game since the Mega Drive golden years, and remains a 2D classic". GamesRadar called it the 13th best Sonic game in 2017. The same year, USgamer named it the sixth best, stating that while it did not feel like the classic Genesis games, its graphics were "gorgeous", which helped make the game a standout for the franchise.

Sonic Advance was the first Sonic game released for a Nintendo console. GamesRadar considered this to be highly significant as Nintendo and Sega were fierce rivals throughout the 1990s; Sonic Advance helped end this rivalry by "reducing Sonic's die-hard brand loyalty to a distant memory from the halcyon-toned 1990s". The two companies worked closely in the following years, collaborating for the first time in 2003 with F-Zero GX. In 2007, both Sonic and Nintendo's mascot Mario featured in Mario & Sonic at the Olympic Games. Nintendo Power wrote that Sonic—created as opposition to Nintendo—seemed at home on Nintendo consoles; GamesRadar said Sega and Nintendo were now "like old friends".

Sonic Advance was also the first Sonic game developed by Dimps. Sega continued to contract the company in following years to create many games in the series. The first of these were two sequels to Sonic Advance—Sonic Advance 2 (2002) and Sonic Advance 3 (2004). Dimps also developed the Nintendo DS games Sonic Rush (2005) and Sonic Rush Adventure (2007), the handheld versions of Sonic Colors (2010), Sonic Generations (2011), and Sonic Lost World (2013), and co-developed Sonic the Hedgehog 4 (2010) and the PlayStation 2 and Wii versions of Sonic Unleashed (2008) with Sonic Team. Several journalists have noted that Dimps' handheld games have received consistently better reviews than Sonic Team's home console games. GamesRadar wrote this was because Dimps "managed to keep the spirit" of the original games alive in their titles.
