= Sega Sammy Holdings =

American holding company

Sega Sammy Holdings Inc.
- Logo used since 2018

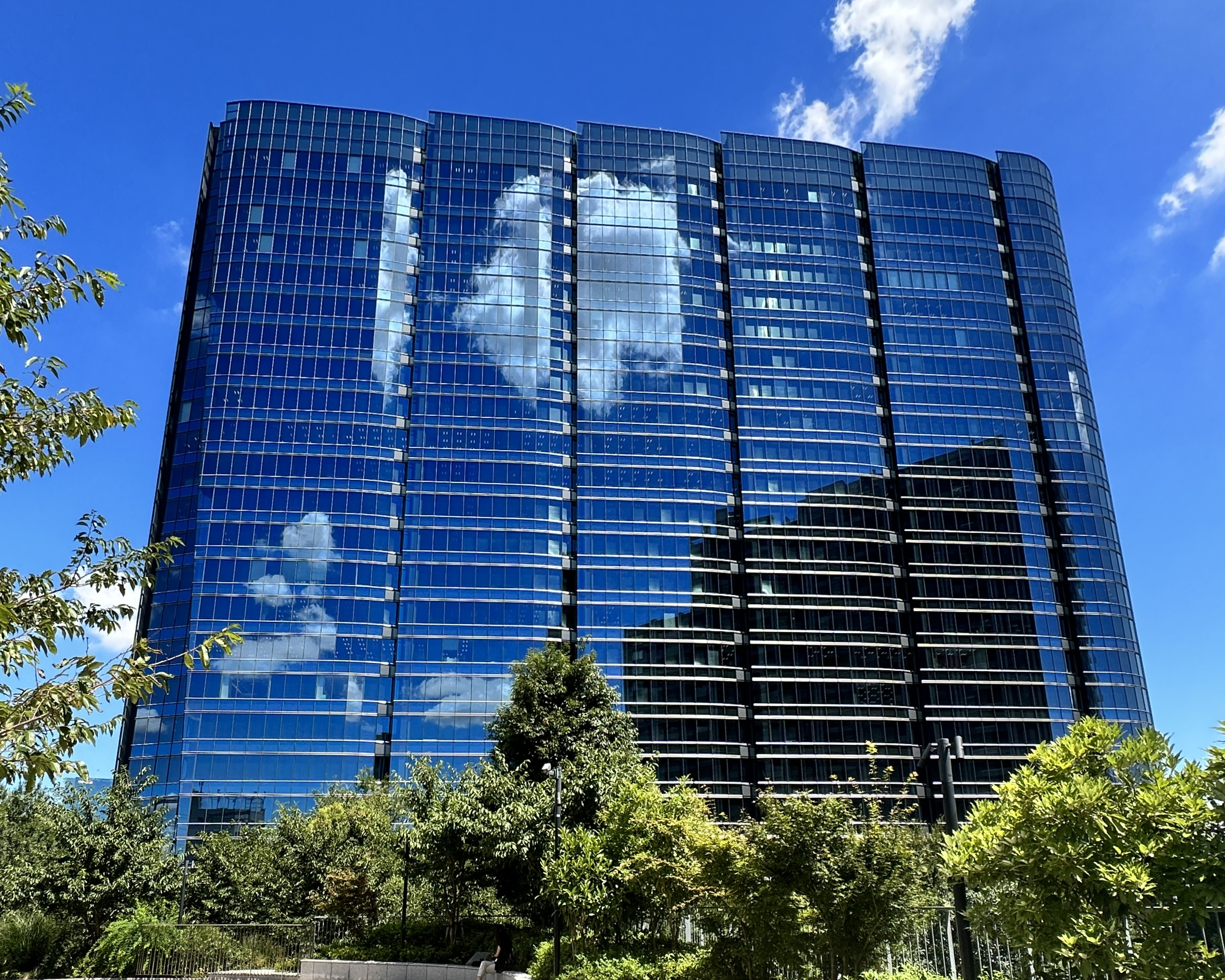
- Headquarters in Nishi-Shinagawa, Shinagawa, Tokyo
- Trade name: Sega Sammy
- Native name: セガサミーホールディングス株式会社
- Romanized name: Sega Samī Hōrudingusu kabushikigaisha
- Type: Public
- Traded as: TYO: 6460
- ISIN: JP3419050004
- Industry: Mass media Entertainment
- Founded: October 1, 2004; 22 years ago
- Headquarters: Sumitomo Fudosan Osaki Garden Tower, Nishi-Shinagawa, Shinagawa, Tokyo, Japan
- Area served: Worldwide
- Key people: Hajime Satomi; (chairman); Haruki Satomi; (president and Group CEO)
- Revenue: ▼¥428.9 billion (US$2.71 billion) (2025)
- Operating income: ▼¥48.1 billion (US$303.82 million) (2025)
- Net income: ▲¥45 billion (US$284.24 million) (2025)
- Owner: HS Company (17.6%)
- Number of employees: 8,147 (2025)
- Subsidiaries: Sega Corporation; Sammy Corporation; Sega Sammy Creation; Sega Music; Sega Sammy Golf Entertainment; Sunrockers; Sega Sammy Business Support; Sega Sammy Innovation
- Website: www.segasammy.co.jp

Sega Sammy Holdings Inc. (Note: Japanese: セガサミーホールディングス株式会社, Hepburn: Sega Samī Hōrudingusu kabushiki gaisha) (also known as the Sega Sammy Group or simply as Sega Sammy) is a Japanese global holding company and conglomerate formed from the merger of Sega and Sammy Corporation in 2004. Both companies are involved in the amusement industry (Sega with arcade and home video games, Sammy with pachinko machines).

== Background ==
=== Sega ===
Sega was founded on June 3, 1960, by American businessmen Martin Bromley, Irving Bromberg, David Rosen, and James Humpert. The company started to distribute slot machines to U.S. bases in Japan. During the 1960s, Service Games was renamed to Sega Enterprises, Ltd. Sega sold its first product, the electro-mechanical game called Periscope, which became a worldwide hit. In 1969, Sega Enterprises was acquired by U.S. conglomerate Gulf and Western Industries (now Skydance). In 1983, Sega launched the SG-1000, the first 8-bit video game platform. In 1986, a management buyout, led by Computer Service acquired Sega Enterprises through capital participation. Sega Europe Ltd. was established in Europe, and in 1985, Sega Enterprises, Inc. was established in the United States. These regional subsidiaries served as a marketing base for amusement arcade machines.

During 1985, Sega released Hang-On, the world's first force feedback game. Sega Enterprises was registered stock on over-the-counter (OTC) market. In 1988, Sega listed stock on the second section of Tokyo Stock Exchange. Within this year, Sega released the Sega Mega Drive/Genesis, a 16-bit home video game platform that solidified Sega's presence in the console market. During this year, Sega also launched the R-360, the world's first amusement arcade cabinet could rotate 360 degrees in all directions. In 1991, Sega released Sonic the Hedgehog as a competitor mascot to represent Sega against Nintendo's Mario, and with 15 million copies sold, Sonic the Hedgehog spawned multiple sequels over the years and became Sega's flagship franchise.

In 1992, Sega released Virtua Racing in order to utilise polygonal 3D-graphics engines, and in 1993, Sega released Virtua Fighter, the world's first polygonal 3D fighting game. In 1994, Sega launched the Sega Saturn, a 32-bit home video game platform. In 1995, Sega launched Print Club Arcades in partnership with Atlus. In 1996, Sega released Sakura Wars, a Japan exclusive sim-based Strategy RPG that became a cultural phenomenon within Japan, spawning a multi-media franchise. In 1997, Sega attempted to merge with toy manufacturer Bandai with Sega as the surviving entity (which would be named Sega Bandai following the merger), but the deal eventually fell through. In 1998, Sega launched the Sega Dreamcast. In 2000, Sega Enterprises changed their name to Sega Corporation. During this year, Sega released Phantasy Star Online, the first networked role-playing game (RPG) for home video game platforms. In 2001, Sega discontinued the Dreamcast and withdrew from the console hardware industry to become a third-party video game developer and publisher.

=== Sammy Corporation ===
Sammy Corporation was founded on November 1, 1975, as Sammy Industry Co., Ltd. by Japanese businessman Hajime Satomi. It was formed from Satomi Corporation's manufacturing and marketing divisions for amusement arcade machines. In the 1980s, Sammy marketed and sold Pachislot machines, and in the 1990s, Sammy expanded their portfolio by marketing and selling Pachinko machines. These two business ventures have been the primary pillar of Sammy Corporations revenue. During 1997, Sammy Industry Co., Ltd. changed its name to Sammy Corporation. By 2000, Sammy Corporation was listed in the Tokyo Stock Exchange's 1st section, indicating it as a "large company". Outside of Pachinko and Pachislot industry, Sammy Corporation was also involved in the video game industry as a publisher for fighting games such as the Guilty Gear series (developed by Arc System Works), The Rumble Fish series (developed by Dimps) and Survival Arts.

== History ==
The Sega Sammy Holdings logo used from the incorporation of the company until 2018.

=== Formation ===
Sammy CEO Hajime Satomi's first significant connection with Sega developed through Sega providing software for one of Sammy’s pachislot machines. Through this, Satomi established relationships with several Sega employees. One of the earliest was Hisashi Suzuki, Sega’s vice president of development, whom Satomi respected for maintaining an interest in lower-end machines despite Sega’s reputation for producing high-end arcade titles such as Virtua Fighter.

During a period when Sammy faced financial difficulties, Satomi approached Sega chairman Isao Okawa for a loan. Satomi repaid the loan significantly faster than Okawa had anticipated. Following this, Okawa began consulting Satomi on various matters concerning Sega and at one point asked him to consider becoming the company’s CEO, though Satomi declined at the time.

Satomi also developed a relationship with Hisao Oguchi, the head of Sega’s AM3 division. Hisashi Suzuki held Oguchi in high regard, and Satomi and Oguchi later attended a gaming trade show in the United States together. Satomi viewed Oguchi positively as a relatively young executive who had only recently assumed his position, in contrast to several other executives whom Satomi reportedly viewed less favorably after speaking alone with around 150 Sega staff members for 30 minutes at a time. According to Satomi, executives at Sega had contradictory visions for the company, which strained staff on the ground.

In February 2003, Sega and Sammy announced their intentions to merge. Satomi would head the new company. However, this deal ultimately fell apart. In the year following, Sammy purchased 22.4% of Sega, forced out several Sega executives, and installed Satomi as chairman. By May 2004, the two companies announced a new merger, though this was essentially a takeover of Sega by Sammy. Sega president Hisao Oguchi was named vice president of the new company.

The combined company was named Sega Sammy Holdings rather than “Sammy Sega,” despite Sammy providing much of the capital. The naming decision was intended to help maintain morale among Sega employees.

According to the first Sega Sammy Annual Report, the merger happened due to the companies facing financial difficulties. According to Satomi, Sega had been in the red for nearly 10 years and lacked a clear financial base. Sammy, on the other hand, feared stagnation and overreliance of its highly profitable pachislot and pachinko machine business, and wanted to diversify its business in new fields, using Sega's broader range of involvement in different entertainment fields. Because there is not much overlap in culture between Sega and Sammy, this was done to have a more synergy among the group.

=== Beginning of operations ===
In 2005, Sega Europe acquired British studio The Creative Assembly. That same year, Sega Sammy acquired 50.2% voting shares of animation studio and entertainment company TMS Entertainment, converting the company into a consolidated subsidiary. Sega Sammy previously held a minority stake in TMS, which was inherited from Sega. In 2006, Sega Europe purchased Sports Interactive.

On December 22, 2010, Sega Sammy Holdings acquired the remaining outstanding shares of TMS Entertainment, Sammy NetWorks, and Sega Toys, thus making all three companies, wholly owned subsidiaries of Sega Sammy Holdings. In April 2017, Marza Animation Planet, Sega's CGI animation studio, was restructured into TMS Entertainment.

Together, as the Sega Sammy group, the company has grown and acquired and founded multiple companies.

=== Restructuring ===
Until 2015, the group was structured in four areas:

- The "Consumer Business", which contained video games, toys and animation.
- The "Amusement Machine Business" which contained Sega's arcade business.
- The "Amusement Center Business" which contained Sega's amusement centers and theme parks.
- The "Pachislot and Pachinko Business" is the Sammy Corporation and is the main pillar of the group's revenue.

For the better half of the first decade of the holding's existence it has sought the arcade machine sales of Sega and the pachinko sales of Sammy, as its biggest financial incentive. A shift happened in the 2010s, leading to the "Group Structure Reform" in 2015. Casinos, resorts and digital games became the biggest financial incentives. Arcade sales and packaged games from Sega has softened, while growth in pachinko sales is not anticipated. By this point, Sega Sammy restructured into three business units: Entertainment Contents (which compromises of the company's video game, animation, amusement and toy companies, all under Sega Holdings), Pachinko & Pachislot (compromising of the company's gambling business, under Sammy) and Resort (compromising of the company's resort and casino assets).

=== Post-restructuring ===
On November 4, 2020, it was announced that Sega Sammy would sell 85.1% of Sega Entertainment, its arcade operating business, to Genda Inc., an amusement equipment rental business, due to the effects of the COVID-19 pandemic on its arcade and amusement facilities businesses. Sega will still be involved in the arcade machine manufacturing business.

On January 29, 2021, Sega Sammy announced that it would restructure and split its corporate functions for their businesses which occurred at the beginning of the 2022 fiscal year. That same year, it was announced that Sega Sammy would be a kit sponsor for J2 League club Tokyo Verdy, and their women's team, Nippon TV Tokyo Verdy Beleza, and also sponsored a Tokyo Classic match on September 26, 2021, between Verdy and crosstown rival FC Machida Zelvia.

Sega Sammy Holdings announced in April that it has made a €706 million ($776 million USD) offer to acquire Rovio Entertainment. Rovio rejected an earlier acquisition bid from Israeli mobile company Playtika for $800 million. The deal closed on 17 August 2023, making the latter company a wholly owned subsidiary of Sega.

In November 2023, Sega Sammy Creation announced that it would acquire sports betting company, GAN Limited, for the price of $1.97 per share pending regulatory approval. After an extension, the acquisition was completed on May 27, 2025.

In January 2024, Sega Sammy announced that it would transfer the Amusement Machine business of Sega to Sega Toys, while also changing the name of Sega Toys to Sega Fave Corporation, which is scheduled to take effect during April of 2024. In order for the company to focus more on its core businesses, the company's board has elected that it would sell Phoenix Segaia Resort to Fortress Investment Group on May 10 that same year pending regulatory approval.

In July 2024, Sega Sammy announced it would acquire Dutch online gambling platform Stakelogic for $141 million, pending regulatory approval with the transaction set to close by the 2026 fiscal year.

The intertwining dynamics of the operating income of Sega's and Sammy's businesses changed throughout the decades. The pachinko and pachislot machine sales of Sammy were overwhelmingly bigger than Sega's business from 2009 to 2015. From 2017 to 2024, Sega's entertainment contents overtook pachinko and pachislot sales several times or often had about half or a third of the profits of Sammy.

On April 16, 2025, the Amsterdam District Court ordered Sega Sammy to complete its acquisition of Stakelogic after rejecting a request for the company to exit the acquisition. The acquisition was completed three weeks later.

== Business structure ==
Sega Sammy's business consists of three segments, which covers entertainment contents (including video games, animation and toys), pachinko & pachislot and casino & resort.

=== Entertainment contents business ===
The entertainment contents business provides a diverse range of entertainment from digital content to toys. These are the companies and subsidiaries affiliated with the Sega Sammy Group's entertainment contents business.

- Sega Corporation
  - Sega development studios (Sonic Team, Ryu Ga Gotoku Studio)
    - Sega Sapporo Studio Co., Ltd.
    - Sega Shanghai Co., Ltd.
  - Atlus Co., Ltd.
  - Marza Animation Planet Inc.
    - Marza Animation Planet USA Inc.
  - Sega of America, Inc.
  - Sega Europe Limited
    - The Creative Assembly, Limited
      - Sega Black Sea EOOD
    - Hardlight
    - Rovio Entertainment Ltd.
      - Rovio Sweden AB
      - Rovio Copenhagen Aps
      - Rovio Barcelona SLU
      - Rovio Interactive Entertainment Canada, Ltd.
      - Rovio Toronto, Inc.
      - Ruby Games
      - Rovio (Shanghai) Commerce and Trading Co., Ltd.
    - Sports Interactive Limited
    - Two Points Studios Limited
    - Sega Publishing Europe, Ltd.
  - Sega Publishing Korea Ltd.
  - Sega Singapore Pte. Ltd.
  - Sega Taiwan Ltd.
  - Sega XD Co., Ltd.
  - Sega Play Heart, Inc.
  - Sega Fave Corporation
    - Hivecreation Co., Ltd.
    - Dartslive Co., Ltd.
      - DARTSLIVE INTERNATIONAL Ltd.
      - iDarts Group Ltd.
      - DARTSLIVE ASIA Ltd.
      - DARTSLIVE CHINA Ltd.
      - DARTSLIVE USA, INC
      - DARTSLIVE EUROPE SAS
      - DARTSLIVE UK LTD.
    - Sega Logistics Service Co., Ltd.
    - Sega Amusements Taiwan Ltd.
    - Sega Toys (HK) Co., Ltd.
  - TMS Entertainment Co., Ltd.
    - Toon Harbor Works Inc.
    - TMS Entertainment USA, Inc.
    - TMS Entertainment Europe SAS
    - TMS Music Co., Ltd.

=== Pachislot and Pachinko machine business ===
These are the companies and subsidiaries affiliated with Sega Sammy Group's pachislot and pachinko machine business.

- Sammy Corporation
  - Sammy Networks Co., Ltd.
    - Artic Arcade
  - Sammy Digital Security
  - Ginza Corporation
  - RODEO Co., Ltd.
  - Taiyo Elec Co., Ltd.
  - m2R Co., Ltd.
  - Galaxy Graphics Inc.

=== Gaming business ===
These are companies charged with operating the Sega Sammy Group's resorts and casinos, including the development and sale of casino machines.

- Sega Sammy Creation Inc.
  - GAN Limited
  - Stakelogic
  - PARADISE SEGASAMMY Co., Ltd.

=== Other Group Companies ===
- Sega Music Co., Ltd.
- Sega Sammy Golf Entertainment Inc.
- Japanese B.League basketball team
  - Tokyo Sunrockers
- Sega Sammy Business Support Inc.
- Sega Sammy Innovation Corporation

== Related companies ==
=== Current affiliates ===
- ENGI (Sammy owns 40% of the company, with Kadokawa Corporation owning 53% while making it a direct subsidiary and Ultra Super Pictures having 5%)
- CA Sega Joypolis (14.9% minority ownership, the rest of the company is owned and operated by China Animations Character Co.)

=== Former affiliates and/or subsidiaries ===
- Sammy Studios (now High Moon Studios)
- Sega Entertainment Co., Ltd. (Sega's former arcade business; majority stake sold in 2020 to Genda, with remainder sold January 2022)
  - Oasis Park Co., Ltd.
- SI Electronics Ltd.
- SIMS Co., Ltd.
- Index Corporation
  - Index Asia Co, Ltd.
- Technosoft
- Visual Concepts (Sold to Take-Two Interactive)
- Dimps Corporation (Sega and Sammy were major shareholders at one point, along with Bandai Namco Entertainment and Sony Interactive Entertainment)
- Japan Multimedia Services Corporation
- HONEST Co., Ltd.
- InfiniTalk Co., Ltd.
- patina Co., Ltd.
- PHOENIX RESORT CO., LTD.
- D×L CREATION Co., Ltd.
- Butterfly Corporation
- f4samurai, Inc.
- Sega Sammy BUSAN INC.
- Relic Entertainment (Became independent)
- Demiurge Studios (Became independent)
- Amplitude Studios (Became independent)
- Sega Games Co., Ltd. (Merged with Sega Interactive in April 1, 2020)
- Sega Interactive Co., Ltd. (Merged with Sega Games in April 1, 2020)
- Sega Networks Co., Ltd. (Absorbed into Sega Games in April 1, 2015)
- AG Square (merged into Sega Entertainment on October 1, 2012)
- Red Entertainment
- Spike
- Sega Sammy Investment and Partners (merged with Marza Animation Planet in March 2011)
- Sega Amusements International (transferred to Kaizen Entertainment Limited on March 30, 2021. The company will continue to use the Sega brand after the transfer.)
- Sega Group Corporation (previously known as Sega Holdings Co., Ltd. before being renamed in April 1, 2020. It was absorbed into Sega in April 1, 2021)
- Sega Music Networks Co., Ltd.

== See also ==
- List of conglomerates
- D.League
