= Sonic Pinball Party =

2003 video game

- European cover art, depicting Sonic, Nights and Amigo
- Developers: Sonic Team; Jupiter
- Publisher: Sega
- Director: Akinori Nishiyama
- Producers: Yuji Naka; Hatao Ogata
- Artist: Yuji Uekawa
- Composers: Tatsuyuki Maeda; Teruhiko Nakagawa; Yutaka Minobe
- Series: Sonic the Hedgehog
- Platform: Game Boy Advance
- Release: NA: May 27, 2003; JP: July 17, 2003; EU: October 31, 2003
- Genres: Action, pinball
- Modes: Single player, multiplayer

Sonic Pinball Party (Note: Japanese: ソニックピンボールパーティー, Hepburn: Sonikku Pinbōru Pātī) is a 2003 pinball video game developed by Sonic Team and Jupiter and published by Sega for the Game Boy Advance. The game features many references to Sonic Team's previous games, most prominently Sonic the Hedgehog, Nights into Dreams, and Samba De Amigo.

Sonic Pinball Party received generally positive reviews from critics. In 2005, the game would be released on two Twin Pack cartridges bundled with Sonic Battle and Sonic Advance, respectively.

== Plot ==
The story is set in Casinopolis (in Station Square), where Doctor Eggman turns the people gambling into robots, and brainwashes Miles "Tails" Prower and Amy Rose. Sonic must rescue his friends by winning a pinball tournament called the "Egg Cup Tournament."

== Gameplay ==
Sonic Pinball Party is a pinball video game with the objective being to earn as many points as possible. During both the Story and Arcade Modes of the game, the player starts each match with three pinballs, each one shot onto the playfield from the plunger. When the pinball rolls into the hole on the bottom of the table, the player loses a ball and must try again with another. Losing all three pinballs ends the pinball match. The player can control each pinball on the table using the two flippers set on the lower part of the table or the lone flipper placed in the upper right side of the table, and has the ability to shake the pinball table in three directions. With these methods, the player can make the pinball sling and hit one of the pinball tables' targets in order to gain points.

Story Mode features five different matches, while the basic goal of Arcade Mode is simply to gain points until the player has run out of balls. The player's best scores from Arcade mode will be listed in the Rankings if they are high enough. Rings/Blue Chips collected in either Story or Arcade Mode can be used to purchase Chao Eggs and similar objects in the Tiny Chao Garden or as wagers in the Casinopolis minigames.

== Development and release ==
Sonic Pinball Party was published by Sega and developed by Sonic Team. The game was first announced in January 2003 by Sega of Japan.

The game was released in the United States on May 27, 2003. It was sold exclusively at Target stores. The game was later re-released in 2005 in compilation collections for the Game Boy Advance with Sonic Advance, Sonic Battle, and Columns Crown. In Europe, the game was exclusively distributed by THQ, as part of a new co-publishing contract with Sega Europe.

== Reception ==
Reception

Aggregate score
Aggregator	Score
Metacritic	77/100

Review scores
Publication	Score
Electronic Gaming Monthly	7.5/10
Game Informer	6/10
GamePro	4/5
GameSpot	8.1/10
GameSpy	74/100
IGN	8.3/10
Nintendo Power	41/50
Play	B+

Sonic Pinball Party received generally positive reviews from critics and journalists alike; on Metacritic, it has a score of 77 out of 100 based on 15 reviews and on GameRankings it has a score of 79.38% based on 16 reviews. GamePro praised the graphics and the gameplay, stating it to have "enough extras to keep any Sega fan enthralled." Frank Provo of GameSpot praised the game's overall gameplay and the artistic quality of pinball tables, while also saying that the multiplayer mini-games were "welcome additions to the overall conglomeration that composes Sonic Pinball Party, even if they don't really fit the premise of standard pinball."

Craig Harris of IGN praised the game for the "virtual" aspect of the pinball gameplay and offering a huge amount of content, but criticized its lightweight physics which made it difficult to pull off skilled, bulls-eye shots, and the Casino mini-games for not being balanced very well. His overall statement was that Sonic Pinball Party was "a great game, but not quite a must-have." Christian Nutt of GameSpy was not completely satisfied with the game, stating that it was "serviceable enough pinball romp that's too focused on presenting a pseudo-realistic game without the technical clout to back it up."
