= Universal Century Gundam Online =

Massively multiplayer video game

Universal Century Gundam Online was a massively multiplayer online role-playing game based in the Universal Century Gundam universe that launched in 2006.

There was a monthly fee for this game which is ¥1575 for 30 days of access (approximately US$17).

On June 15, 2007, Dimps announced that Gundam Online would be going offline at 10:00 JST on December 15, 2007. The game is no longer in service.

== Gameplay ==
Players control an avatar within a game world in a third person view. Players can also pilot various vehicles and Mobile Suits. They can fight various other Mobile Suits, Vehicles controlled by other players, or NPCs.

Each Mobile Suit and Vehicle may be improved by the player a total of eight times, and can be outfitted with an array of equipment, with most MS having between 2 and 7 equipped and selectable weapons (only one weapon was actively held and firable) at a time.

The player's avatar can be created on one of two factions, the Principality of Zeon or the Earth Federation Forces, each with their own unique cities, vehicles, and Mobile Suits.

Players may attack other players of the opposing faction, as well attacking their own fellow faction players, though this would result in the player going "Criminal" and subject to penalty free attacking and killing by all players.

Players may form teams, which organize large groups of players and allow them coordinate activities through a reserved chat channel.

In order to combat enemies, players must "lock-on" to their enemies and initiate attacks, but all attack, dodge, shield block, and miss rolls of the weapons in the game were done automatically through dice rolls, as typical with other MMOs.

=== Setting ===
The game takes place in the Gundam Universal Century universe, more specifically the One Year War period, though most of the MS, MA, and vehicles in the game are featured from the Mobile Suit Variations publications, 0083:Stardust Memory and elements of Mobile Suit Zeta Gundam.

Development went through many stages, with the original plan being for the game to encompass the entire Earth. Some have speculated that each continent would have been a regional server for players on that particular continent. Space was released as the first and only expansion to the game, with many additional space MS variants added to the game such as the MS-09RS Rick Dom, the space versions of the GM C Kai and GM G Command, the "High Mobility" type Space Zakus; Mobile Armours and vehicles such as the RB-79 Ball, the Oggo, and many more. Though there are Earth Federation Forces (EFF) badges that are recolored and branded as "Titans" badges in the game's files, the Titans faction does not have any of the other required textures and graphical files to be used as a viable faction. The progression of the game was hinting towards moving into the Zeta era of the Universal Century, however with the shutdown of UCGO, the players may never know.

Players were able to choose between four cities on each faction on the continent of Australia and in a limited zone in space around the Earth. Currently the player cannot go to the Moon or any colonies, though there is a faction-specific "Space Station" of sorts where the players could craft and engage in pvp battles. They also added an asteroid zone (with most of the asteroids having no collision mapping), for players to engage in PVP battles in, called Helenes.

There were also two "capturable" warzone cities known as Newman and Richmond. Helping capture or defend these cities would result in medals for the player that would allow them to purchase special "gold" versions of certain weapons at each of the two cities, depending on their medal count per city. These warzones would be initiated by the attacking faction starting the war, an hour of wartime, and then a "peace" timer after a successful capture or defense, after the peace timer had depleted, the war-zone would be in a "truce" status again.

== Community ==
Before closing, the game was primarily populated with Japanese players, but international players often found ways to get into the game and made up a minority of the population.

Despite the closing of the official server, community members have created their own private servers in an attempt to revive the game.

List of Private Servers:

http://www.ucgohost.com (2020 and ongoing) - Currently a test server but does have most of the elements of the "Final Version" of the emulated UCGO Private Server.

http://www.ucgoserver.com - Referred to as "UCGO Private Server" or "UCGOPS", etc. (Currently shutdown but you can access the website to download the "Private Server" server files and host your own server)

2009–2012 - Beta Testing and First Emulated Server of UCGO Launched in 2010

2013–2015 - First Reset, commonly referred to as "UCGO PS 2.0"

2016–2018 - Second Reset with minimal playerbase return

2019 - Final "Version" with a silent/unannounced reset and shut down
