= Inuyasha: A Feudal Fairy Tale =

2002 video game

- Developer: Dimps
- Publisher: Bandai
- Directors: Kenichiro Hori; Shinichi Yoshimoto
- Producers: Hideyuki Tomioka; Hiroshi Matsumoto
- Designer: Keiichiro Morita
- Programmer: Kenshi Abe
- Artist: Shigemi Ikeda
- Composers: Kenshiro; Hiroyuki Takei
- Platform: PlayStation
- Release: JP: December 5, 2002
- Genre: Fighting
- Modes: Single player, multiplayer

InuYasha: A Feudal Fairy Tale (犬夜叉 戦国お伽合戦, Inuyasha: Sengoku Otogi Kassen) is a 2D fighting game based on the manga and anime series Inuyasha. It consists of battles and minigames in an effort to retrieve shards of the sacred Jewel of Four Souls, essentially following the overall plot of the series.

== Gameplay ==
Inuyasha: A Feudal Fairy Tale is a two-dimensional fighting game featuring characters from Rumiko Takahashi's Inuyasha manga and anime series. Players battle opponents using basic attacks, character-specific special moves and more powerful super attacks. The combat system was designed to be accessible to inexperienced fighting game players, with special attacks performed using relatively simple controls. Super attacks become available when a character's demonic or spiritual energy gauge is filled.

The game features several modes. In the main story mode, known as Feudal Fairy Tale, players travel between locations and participate in battles to collect shards of the Shikon Jewel. Collecting shards unlocks additional playable characters, who can also be used in other modes. The versus mode allows players to select characters for one-on-one battles, while the tag-team mode introduces a character-switching system. Players can switch between two fighters during a match by consuming energy from a combination gauge, or perform a combined attack involving both characters.

== Characters ==
- Demon Inuyasha (Note: Unlockable character)
- Inuyasha
- Kagome Higurashi
- Kagura
- Kikyo
- Koga
- Miroku
- Naraku
- Sango
- Sesshomaru
- Shippo
- Totosai

== Development and release ==
Inuyasha: A Feudal Fairy Tale was developed by Japanese studio Dimps and published by Bandai. The Game Developer Research Institute identifies EXRAYS Co., Ltd. as a subcontractor on the project, working alongside Dimps. The game was the second Inuyasha title released for the PlayStation, following the 2001 role-playing game Inuyasha. Unlike its predecessor, it was developed as a two-dimensional fighting game.

The game was released in Japan on December 5, 2002, with a retail price of ¥5,800 before tax. The initial production run included a special edition package containing a collectible Carddass card and a game fanbook featuring character information and gameplay guidance.

== Reception ==
Reception

Aggregate score
| Aggregator | Score |
|---|---|
| Metacritic | 69/100 |

Review scores
| Publication | Score |
|---|---|
| Electronic Gaming Monthly | 6/10 |
| Official U.S. PlayStation Magazine | 3/5 |

The game received "mixed or average" reviews according to the review aggregation website Metacritic, which reported an average score of 69 out of 100 based on five critics.

Contemporary reviewers generally regarded the game as more appealing to fans of the source material than to experienced fighting game players. GameCritics awarded it 80 out of 100, describing it as an enjoyable budget-priced fighting game despite its inability to compete with more established entries in the genre. PSX Nation gave it 79 out of 100, praising its character and anime-inspired presentation while criticizing its reliance on button-mashing. GameNow awarded it 7.5 out of 10, describing it as a relatively straightforward but enjoyable two-dimensional fighting game.

Electronic Gaming Monthly was less enthusiastic, awarding the game 6 out of 10 and criticizing its simplistic combat, stiff controls and limited visual appeal. Official U.S. PlayStation Magazine likewise awarded it 3 out of 5, finding the game accessible to fans of the anime but criticizing its fighting mechanics and balance.
