= Columns Crown =

2001 video game

- U.S. cover art
- Developer: Wow Entertainment
- Publisher: Sega: NA: THQ
- Series: Columns
- Platform: Game Boy Advance
- Release: PAL: December 7, 2001; JP: December 13, 2001; NA: February 4, 2002
- Genre: Puzzle
- Mode: Single-player

Columns Crown (コラムス クラウン, Koramusu Kuraun) is a puzzle game developed by WOW Entertainment and published by Sega for the Game Boy Advance. It is part of the Columns series and was released in Europe on December 7, 2001, in Japan on December 13, 2001, and in North America on February 4, 2002. The game was later re-released twice as part of the 2 Games in 1 twin-pack cartridge in Europe, first bundled with Sonic Pinball Party on November 11, 2005 and then with ChuChu Rocket! on November 28, 2008. The latter compilation, aside as being the final one released on the system in Europe, was the final game to be released on the Game Boy Advance.

The gameplay features falling vertical blocks of three coloured gems, with matching gems being destroyed. There is a basic plot of rescuing the stolen kingdom's crown by winning games.

There is a power-up feature, with different potential attack and defence features being possible to use, with most only being available during player-to-player versus games.

== Reception ==
Reception

Aggregate score
Aggregator	Score
GameRankings	67.50%(13 reviews)

IGN gave a mixed review to Columns Crown, saying that while the versus mode was enjoyable with use of the power-ups, the game as a whole was much less addictive than other similar games released on the Game Boy Advance. Former publication Cubed3 criticized the gameplay as "restricted", stating that navigating levels successfully seemed dependent on luck rather than skill. GameSpot gave a mixed review, stating "Although it's not as energetic or complex as many modern-day puzzle games, it doesn't really disappoint in any specific area either."
