= Mario Kart: Super Circuit =

2001 video game

- North American box art
- Developer: Intelligent Systems
- Publisher: Nintendo
- Directors: Takeshi Ando; Yukio Morimoto
- Producers: Shigeru Miyamoto; Kenji Miki
- Composers: Kenichi Nishimaki; Masanobu Matsunaga; Minako Hamano
- Series: Mario Kart
- Platform: Game Boy Advance
- Release: JP: July 21, 2001; NA: August 27, 2001; EU: September 14, 2001
- Genre: Kart racing
- Modes: Single-player, multiplayer

Mario Kart: Super Circuit (Note: Known in Japan as Mario Kart Advance (Japanese: マリオカートアドバンス, Hepburn: Mario Kāto Adobansu)) is a 2001 kart racing game for the Game Boy Advance (GBA). It is the third Mario Kart game and retains its predecessors' gameplay: as a Mario franchise character, the player races opponents around tracks based on locales from the Super Mario platform games. Tracks contain obstacles and power-ups that respectively hamper and aid the player's progress. Super Circuit includes various single-player and multiplayer game modes, including a Grand Prix racing mode and a last man standing battle mode.

Super Circuit was developed by Intelligent Systems and published by Nintendo. It was the first handheld Mario Kart game and the only game in the series developed by Intelligent Systems. Its graphical style changed drastically from early demos, with the final release resembling Super Mario Kart (1992) visually. Nintendo revealed Super Circuit alongside the GBA in 2000 and released it in mid-2001, months after the console's launch.

Super Circuit received acclaim, with praise for its modes, presentation, gameplay, and difficulty, though responses to the multiplayer were mixed. Retrospectively, critics have ranked it as one of the best GBA games, but one of the lesser Mario Kart games due to its lack of technical innovation compared to its predecessors. It was nominated for several awards and won one. Super Circuit sold 5.91 million copies worldwide, making it the fourth-bestselling GBA game. It was rereleased digitally for the Virtual Console line on the Nintendo 3DS in 2011 and the Wii U in 2014, and for the Nintendo Classics service in 2023.

== Gameplay ==
The player, as Yoshi, racing on Peach Circuit, the game's introductory track

Mario Kart: Super Circuit is a kart racing game featuring characters and elements from the Mario franchise. The player controls one of eight Mario characters and races opponents in karts around tracks themed around locales from the Super Mario platform games. Boxes labeled with question marks populate each of the 40 tracks; they give the player a random item based on elements from Super Mario games to help progress. Items can either be power-ups, such as a speed boost, or offensive, such as one that freezes an opponent's kart in place. Tracks are littered with obstacles that slow the player down, and coins that increase their speed once collected. Each playable character is sorted into one of three weight classes that determine how they play, with heavier characters having higher top speeds but slower acceleration. Princess Peach, Toad, and Yoshi are lightweights; Luigi and Mario are middleweights; and Bowser, Donkey Kong, and Wario are heavyweights. There are three difficulty levels themed after engine classes—50cc, 100cc, or 150cc—, with the harder difficulties' more powerful engine classes providing increased maximum speed and control difficulty.

Super Circuit features three single-player modes: Grand Prix (GP), Time Trial, and Quick Run. The main racing mode, GP, sees the player race against seven computer opponents around four consecutive circuits, with the objective of placing first in each race. Each set of tracks is part of a "cup", of which there are 10. Whoever achieves the best overall placements across all four races wins. The player is graded at the end of the GP based on a formula which takes into account several factors of player performance, including how many coins the player collected and the weight class of the character they completed the GP with. Achieving a high grade on any of the game's five original cups unlocks a single-player cup from Super Mario Kart (1992). Time Trial allows the player to race on their own to complete a track in the fastest time possible. The player can compete against another player's fastest time shared via the Game Boy Advance's (GBA) Game Link Cable, a peripheral cable that connects GBA systems. The Japanese release of Super Circuit was compatible with the Mobile Adapter GB peripheral, service for which was discontinued in 2002, which allowed the player to upload and download track times using a mobile phone's internet connection. Quick Run allows the player to race with customizable aspects, such as lap count and toggling item boxes and coins.

Multiplayer modes allow up to four players to compete via the Game Link Cable. It is possible to play multiplayer even if only one player owns the game cartridge, though only one character (Yoshi with different color variations) and four tracks (all being from a Super Mario Kart GP cup) are selectable with this setup. Three modes are playable in multiplayer: GP, Versus (VS), and Battle. GP remains unchanged from its single-player version, though only two players can race at once. VS allows up to four players to race around a single track without computer opponents. Battle mode differs from other modes as it sees up to four players compete in one of four arenas rather than a circuit. Players begin with three balloons above their character and must pop the balloons of other players by attacking them with items. Players are knocked out if they lose all their balloons, and the winner is whoever remains the last man standing.

== Development and release ==
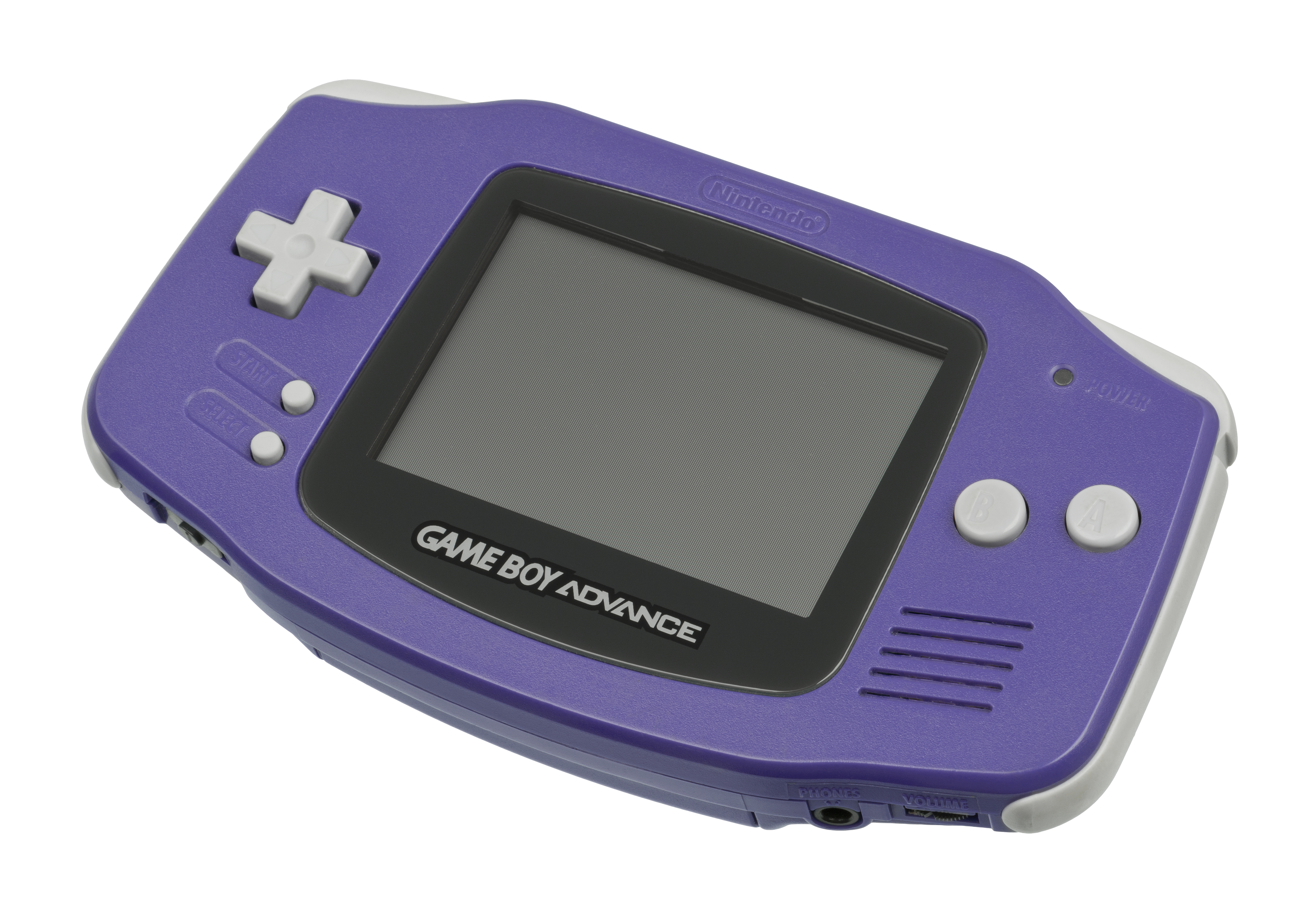
Super Circuit was one of the first games revealed for the Game Boy Advance (pictured).

Mario Kart: Super Circuit was the only Mario Kart game developed by Intelligent Systems. It borrows elements from Super Mario Kart and Mario Kart 64 (1996), and uses a similar graphical style to Super Mario Kart, particularly with its use of parallax scrolling and Mode 7-style scaling. Originally titled Mario Kart Advance in English, Super Circuit was announced by Nintendo prior to its annual Space World exhibition in 2000 and was unveiled alongside the GBA console itself. Gameplay screenshots published in an issue of CoroCoro featured a different super deformed art style, depicting characters with large heads. Items from early versions were also absent in the final release.

Nintendo released Mario Kart: Super Circuit in Japan on July 21, 2001, in North America on August 27, and in Europe on September 14. It released not long after the GBA itself, which launched in March in Japan and June elsewhere. It was the third entry in the Mario Kart series, after Super Mario Kart and Mario Kart 64, and the first released on a handheld console. Nintendo intended to release Super Circuit in mainland China through iQue, which localized Nintendo games for the region. A Chinese translation was created, but its release was canceled due to significant piracy of iQue's first batch of localized GBA games. The game was rereleased for the Nintendo 3DS and Wii U's digital Virtual Console. On the 3DS, it was released free on December 16, 2011 for members of the Ambassador Program, eligible for entry to anyone who accessed the 3DS's eShop service before the console received a price cut. It was made available for purchase on the Wii U in 2014 in North America and 2015 in Europe and Japan. Super Circuit was also rereleased on the Nintendo Switch as part of the Nintendo Classics service on February 8, 2023.

== Reception ==
Reception

Aggregate score
Aggregator	Score
Metacritic	93/100 (Note: Based on 24 reviews)

Review scores
Publication	Score
Electronic Gaming Monthly	25.5/30
Eurogamer	9/10
Famitsu	9/10, 8/10, 9/10, 8/10
GamePro	18/20
GameSpot	8.2/10
GameSpy	96/100
GamesRadar+	95/100
IGN	9.5/10
Jeuxvideo.com	18/20
Nintendo Life	3DS: 7/10; Wii U: 7/10

Award
Publication	Award
IGN	Editors' Choice Award

Mario Kart: Super Circuit received "universal acclaim", according to the review aggregator website Metacritic. The game was successful commercially, selling 5.91 million copies worldwide—the fourth-bestselling GBA game and the system's bestselling non-Pokémon game. In the United Kingdom, Super Circuit sold 350,000 units by 2005 and was the bestselling GBA game in the region, and by 2006 had sold 2.1 million units in the United States. The game was added to Nintendo's "Player's Choice" lineup in 2006.

The single-player modes received praise. Reviewers said the game had significant replay value due to the grading system and large number of tracks. IGN praised the "ghost mode" that allows players to race their friend's saved best time, which they said contributed to replay value. The multiplayer offerings were lauded; Nintendo World Report commended their speed, and GamesRadar declared Super Circuit the best multiplayer game on a handheld console at the time. The battle mode in particular drew praise, although IGN criticized the inability to play against computer opponents in it. The ability for multiplayer modes to be played over multiple consoles with only one game cartridge was met with a more mixed reception. While GameSpot stated that the feature added further value, Nintendo World Report noted performance problems, which they said were enough to hinder gameplay.

Critics enjoyed Super Circuit's gameplay. GamePro described its controls as precise, though they found it difficult to input a power slide move. Nintendo Life, in contrast, stated that controls could have been more precise. GamesRadar said the vehicle handling was superior to competitors like Crash Team Racing (1999) and Diddy Kong Racing (1997), with movement that felt "effortlessly perfect". Reviewers noted the difficulty; IGN described its single player offerings as "extremely challenging" due to the intelligence of computer opponents and the process of unlocking tracks. GameSpy and Nintendo Life agreed that the precision of the controls adds to the challenge, though they became less of a struggle through experience.

Super Circuit's presentation received praise, with critics admiring the visuals. Some reviewers noted its graphical similarity to Super Mario Kart, though they considered it an improvement. Nintendo Life and Nintendo World Report commended the track designs for their thematic variety and attention towards minute details. The original GBA model did not contain a backlit screen, a problem which GameSpot wrote the bright color palette helped rectify. The sound design was well received: IGN described the music as "extremely upbeat", and Nintendo World Report said its stereo audio contained a high degree of precision.

GamePro said Intelligent Systems had combined all the positive aspects of previous Mario Kart games "seamlessly" to create Super Circuit. GamesRadar and IGN said the game had few flaws, the latter naming it an exemplar for the GBA's hardware capabilities. Super Circuit received "Favourite Video Game" at the 2002 Nickelodeon Kids' Choice Awards. It was nominated for the Handheld Game of the Year award at both the 5th Annual Interactive Achievement Awards and the 2002 Golden Joystick Awards, and best "Mobile" game at the 2001 BAFTA Awards show.

== Legacy ==
Despite its positive initial reception, Super Circuit ranks low on retrospective critics' lists of the best Mario Kart games, and Nintendo World Report said it was the Mario Kart game with the "fewest innovations". Critics blamed this on the hardware limitations of the GBA; GamesRadar said that the scarcity of the Link Cable made Super Circuit's multiplayer experience less memorable than other Mario Kart games. Kotaku described Super Circuit as "lost", unable to live up to the technically pioneering releases of Super Mario Kart and 64 because of the GBA's hardware. Nonetheless, critics rank Super Circuit among the best GBA games.

Super Circuit was the first Mario Kart game to include tracks introduced in previous games, a tradition that would carry with every entry in the series starting with Mario Kart DS (2005). In 2017, Paste ranked Super Circuit's Cheese Land as the tenth best track in the Mario Kart series; he cited it as an example of Super Circuit having "some of the wackiest, out-there tracks", surmising that "the course designers hadn't yet been stultified by the series' massive success to come during the DS and Wii eras".
