= The Rumble Fish 2 =

2005 video game

- Developer: Dimps
- Publisher: Sammy (Note: 2022 re-release published by 3goo.)
- Platforms: Arcade; Microsoft Windows; Nintendo Switch; PlayStation 4; PlayStation 5; Xbox One; Xbox Series X/S; Nintendo Switch 2
- Release: Arcade; March 2005; Windows, Switch, PS4, PS5, Xbox One, Series X/S; December 8, 2022; Switch 2 January 22, 2026
- Genre: Fighting
- Mode: Up to 2 players simultaneously
- Arcade system: Atomiswave (2005), NESiCAxLive (2012)

The Rumble Fish 2 (ザ・ランブルフィッシュ2) is a 2D fighting game for the Atomiswave arcade platform. It was produced by Dimps and published by Sammy. It is the sequel to The Rumble Fish, bringing in several new additions. A re-release on Taito's NESiCAxLive arcade digital delivery service was made available in 2012.

The Rumble Fish 2 received home console ports in 2022, released for Microsoft Windows, Nintendo Switch, PlayStation 4, PlayStation 5, Xbox One, and Xbox Series X/S. A version for Nintendo Switch 2 was released on January 22, 2026.

== Gameplay ==
The Rumble Fish 2 uses all of the elements from the first game and adds some new ones. The Offense and Defense gauges have been divided into three sections each, allowing for more usage of Offensive and Defensive Arts, as well as techniques tied to each gauge. An addition to the system is the Boost Dive, which puts each character into a powered-up state according to their style. Most characters have had modifications to their movelists in some way, such as new moves and new commands for old moves.

== Characters ==
All 10 characters from The Rumble Fish return, along with six new characters, for a total of 16. Greed, the previous game's antagonist, is a secret character, playable only after inputting a password in the operator options. New characters are listed below:

- Sheryl - A calm, stoic assassin whose fighting style is based upon the use of wires and setting traps across the screen. She later appeared as a bonus character in the PlayStation 2 release of the original game.
- Mito - A young girl who fights with a wooden bokken. She fights with two different styles: one with wide, sweeping attacks, and one with short, stabbing attacks.
- Bazoo - An over 8 ft tall large man who is caged and seemingly used for sport, which has taken a toll on his mind. He has long range with his arms, and using all kinds of debris to his advantage.
- Lud - Leader of the Valour Gang with a Gauntlet attached to his arm. He focuses on rapid, dashing attacks. He also can guard and absorb any attack with a special gauntlet of his.
- Hazama - He works under PROBE-NEXUS' CEO. He has strong attacks and a somewhat long range. Hazama is also playable, but only after inputting a password in the operator options. He later appeared as a bonus character in the PlayStation 2 release of the original game.
- Beatrice - PROBE-NEXUS' new chairman, a relative of Vlad, and the final boss of the game. She is powerful, with the ability to project long range waves. She is also playable after inputting the operator password, then inputting a code on the character select screen. However, the playable version of Beatrice is significantly less powerful than her final boss counterpart.

== Release ==
In 2020, a homebrew conversion was released for the Dreamcast.

On July 13, 2022, 3goo Co., Ltd. announced that The Rumble Fish 2, along with its predecessor, would be released for PC and home consoles with widescreen support in December 2022. This marks the first time that The Rumble Fish 2 leaves arcades officially, and marks the first time that The Rumble Fish 2 receives a worldwide release.
