= Sonic Advance 2 =

2002 video game

- Developers: Dimps; Sonic Team
- Publisher: Sega: NA: THQ
- Director: Akinori Nishiyama
- Producers: Yuji Naka; Hiroshi Matsumoto
- Designers: Yukihiro Higashi; Masaaki Yamagiwa
- Programmers: Takahiro Hamano; Yoshihisa Hashimoto; Takaaki Saito
- Artist: Yuji Uekawa
- Composers: Tatsuyuki Maeda; Yutaka Minobe; Teruhiko Nakagawa
- Series: Sonic the Hedgehog
- Platform: Game Boy Advance
- Release: JP: December 19, 2002; NA: March 10, 2003; PAL: March 21, 2003
- Genre: Platformer
- Modes: Single player, multiplayer

Sonic Advance 2 (Note: Japanese: ソニックアドバンス2(ツー), Hepburn: Sonikku Adobansu Tsū) is a 2002 platform game developed by Dimps and published by Sega for the Game Boy Advance. It is an installment in the Sonic the Hedgehog series and the sequel to 2001's Sonic Advance. The story follows Sonic as he sets out to save his friends and retrieve the seven magical Chaos Emeralds from Dr. Eggman. Gameplay consists of the player completing various levels as one of five characters, each with their own unique attributes. After each zone is completed, the player faces Dr. Eggman in a boss battle.

Development began in February 2002 and lasted eight months. Sonic Advance 2 was programmed using an updated version of the original's game engine and the team aimed to make the game larger and faster-paced than the original. Sonic Advance 2 was released to positive reviews; critics praised the updates made over the original Advance and its improved replay value in comparison to past games. Some journalists, however, disliked its high difficulty level. A sequel, Sonic Advance 3, was released in 2004. Sonic Advance 2 was re-released for the Wii U's Virtual Console in February 2016 in Japan.

== Gameplay ==
Gameplay screenshot showing Sonic fighting Doctor Eggman

Sonic Advance 2 is a side-scrolling platformer similar in gameplay and style to the original Sonic Advance (2001). The player controls Sonic the Hedgehog, who can unlock three other playable characters: Cream the Rabbit and her Chao named Cheese, Tails, and Knuckles the Echidna after defeating Doctor Eggman in specific boss battles. A fifth character, Amy Rose, can be unlocked after completing the game with each character once each of them has all seven Chaos Emeralds. Each character has their own unique moves and abilities. Sonic can perform an "insta-shield" that protects him for a brief moment; Cream and Tails can fly; Knuckles can glide and climb; and Amy can destroy enemies using a hammer.

In the tradition of Sonic games, gameplay consists of moving quickly through levels. Levels in the game are divided into seven "zones", each consisting of two acts of normal gameplay then a boss battle, where the player fights Doctor Eggman in order to stop him from taking over the world. The player collects rings as a form of health; when the player is hit by an enemy or obstacle, their rings bounce in all directions, and can be recollected before they disappear. Each character starts the game with three lives, and will lose one if they are hit without carrying any rings, fall into a bottomless pit, crushed, drown, or fail to finish the act within 10 minutes. If the player loses their last life, the game ends prematurely. The player can also collect seven "special rings" to access special stages, where Chaos Emeralds are found. Special stages are on a 3D plane, where the character tries to obtain a set number of rings before time runs out in order to collect a Chaos Emerald. After beating all zones and finding all seven Chaos Emeralds with Sonic, an alternate final act is unlocked.

When all of the Chaos Emeralds are collected with the other characters, a sound test feature (where the player can listen to music) and a boss time-attack feature are unlocked, along with the Tiny Chao Garden, where toys for Cheese can be purchased with rings earned in-game. Various mini-games can also be played in the Tiny Chao Garden. Other game modes include a "time-attack" mode where the player tries to beat a specific act in the shortest amount of time, and a multiplayer mode, where players can race each other through unlocked acts.

== Development and release ==
Sonic Advance 2 was developed by the video game studio Dimps, with assistance from Sonic Team. According to producer Yuji Naka, the developers began designing the concept of the game immediately after the completion of the original Sonic Advance, and full development began in February 2002. The design team decided to increase the speed of the original greatly; thus, the levels were made six times larger. The main development period lasted eight months; it was programmed using an updated version of the original Sonic Advance engine. The developers also refined the graphics and sought to make the game feel more "mechanical". The game also marks the first appearance of Cream the Rabbit in the Sonic series; the character was originally designed for 2003's Sonic Heroes, though she was added to Advance 2 before the release of Heroes to help make the game easier for beginning players.

The game's musical score was composed by Yutaka Minobe, Tatsuyuki Maeda and Teruhiko Nakagawa. Sega announced Sonic Advance 2 on July 1, 2002, and showcased it at the Tokyo Game Show in September 2002. It was released in Japan on December 19, 2002, followed by a North American release on March 10, 2003, and in Europe on March 21, 2003.

The game was published by Sega in Japan and Europe (with Infogrames as distributor for the latter) and co-published by THQ in North America. The game was re-released on the Wii U's Virtual Console in Japan on February 24, 2016.

== Reception ==
Reception

Aggregate score
Aggregator	Score
Metacritic	83/100

Review scores
Publication	Score
1Up.com	8.5/10
AllGame	2.5/5
Famitsu	8/10, 8/10, 8/10, 8/10
GameSpot	8.2/10
GameSpy	3/5
IGN	9/10
Nintendo Power	8.2/10

Sonic Advance 2 received "generally favorable reviews", according to review aggregator Metacritic. The game was also commercially successful, selling approximately 176,541 copies in Japan, 740,000 copies in the United States, and 100,000 copies in the United Kingdom, for a total of 1.016 million copies.

The visuals and presentation were one of the most praised aspects of the game. GameSpot considered the game's graphics to be a major advance from the previous game, feeling that it took more advantage of the Game Boy Advance's capabilities and praised the improved character animations, favorably comparing them to that of a cartoon. IGN offered similar praise, calling its visuals more vibrant, bright, and vivid, and also spoke positively of its "peppy" soundtrack. This sentiment was echoed by AllGame. Nintendo World Report called the music catchy and enjoyable, though they criticized the re-use of certain themes from the original Sonic Advance.

Reviewers commended the game's replay value and large level design in comparison to older titles. IGN admired the "massive" designs and felt the levels were much more balanced compared to prior games. They also praised the "crafty" paths for encouraging multiple playthroughs. GameSpot agreed, praising the method of collecting special rings to access special stages and unlock special features for being fun and rewarding. 1UP.com considered this addition interesting and called it "not bad" for the technical limitations of the Game Boy Advance. AllGame, however, felt that the main acts were unoriginal and too short.

The game's difficulty polarized critics. Nintendo World Report began their review by warning players of the difficulty, and felt it spoiled an otherwise-good game. GameSpot described Sonic Advance 2 as the hardest game in the entire series, calling its auto-scrolling boss fights "positively cutthroat", though they did believe that the game's amount of playable characters helped reduce this difficulty. The difficulty was cited as the game's only problem by IGN. 1UP, however, considered it a positive aspect, calling it "a welcome breath of fresh difficulty in this modern age of gaming."

Of the game as a whole, GameSpot felt Sega's risks to deviate from past Sonic games in terms of difficulty and size paid off handsomely. Nintendo Power stated that, while Sonic Advance 2 did not present significant advances beyond the first game, it was still a "solid action title". Despite this, AllGame called it a boring, unoriginal retread, and "more subsonic than supersonic".

== Legacy ==
Cream the Rabbit, who was introduced in Sonic Advance 2, would feature predominantly in future Sonic games. A direct sequel, Sonic Advance 3, was released in 2004; it is the final entry in the Sonic Advance trilogy.
