= The Rumble Fish =

2004 video game

- Developer: Dimps
- Publishers: Sammy (Arcade); Sega (PlayStation 2)
- Platforms: Arcade, PlayStation 2
- Release: Arcade: JP: 2004; PlayStation 2: JP: March 17, 2005; The Rumble Fish+: WW: December 20, 2023
- Genre: 2D Versus fighting
- Mode: Up to 2 players simultaneously
- Arcade system: Atomiswave

The Rumble Fish (ザ・ランブルフィッシュ) is a 2D fighting game developed by Dimps and first published by Sammy for the Atomiswave arcade platform in 2004, and was later ported by Sega to the Sony PlayStation 2 on March 17, 2005. In 2020, a homebrew conversion was released for the Dreamcast. A sequel, The Rumble Fish 2, has since been developed.

On July 13, 2022, 3goo Co., Ltd. announced that The Rumble Fish along with its sequel would get home ports worldwide in Q4 2022. This marks the first time that The Rumble Fish would receive a worldwide release.

On November 29, 2023, it was announced that an enhanced version called The Rumble Fish+ would release on PlayStation 4, Xbox One, Nintendo Switch, and Steam on December 20, 2023.

== Story ==
The game takes place in the distant future during the 21st century. During the turn of the 21st century, a large-scale natural disaster tears through the eastern side of an unverified country, destroying its economical and political operations and taking a total of 158,000 lives. A prominent corporation in the series, called PROBE-NEXUS, moves its base of operations to the ruined east side and begins reconstructing the area. The rebuilt area flourishes again as it becomes a wealthy and busy city known as Zone Prime, which serves as the backdrop for many locales in the game.

In the underground of Zone Prime, PROBE-NEXUS also sponsors a tournament known as the Fight for Survival, or F.F.S., where fighters are gathered from the city's slums and compete for sport. The first Rumble Fish game follows the fifth F.F.S. tournament.

== Gameplay ==
The Rumble Fish uses a unique 2D fighting system with the ability to easily create combos. Weak attacks can easily chain into slower, stronger attacks, a common system shown in games like Guilty Gear and Melty Blood. There is also a button dedicated to multiple evasive maneuvers.

The game also introduces the division of the power gauge into Offense and Defense. Advanced techniques are available to the player, at the cost of either gauge.

=== Offense ===
The Offense gauge fills as the player delivers attacks. As seen in its name, it is used to mount offensive attacks, such as super moves called Offensive Arts. Special techniques exclusive to this meter include the Jolt Attack, which is an unblockable attack that leaves the opponent vulnerable to potentially high-damaging combos, at the expense of a full Offense gauge.

=== Defense ===
The Defense gauge is filled as the player receives and guards against attacks from the opponent. Super moves called Defensive Arts are available only to this gauge; though they are not often as strong as an Offensive Art, they can be used in tactical situations (for example, while guarding an attack or while lying prone on the ground) to stop an opponent's offense. An advanced technique that uses the Defense gauge is the Impact Break, which breaks a player's guard after successfully blocking an attack to allow a counter-offensive.

When both the Offense and Defense gauges are full, they merge into a Critical gauge. The benefits of both meters are still available, but each characters' strongest skill is only available at the Critical point.

A new graphics engine was used to animate the various limbs of each character separately, allowing for more fluid animation. This engine also allows the clothes of each character to rip from wear and tear as they take more damage throughout a match.

== Characters ==
- Zen - A stoic man fighting for himself. He is an all-rounded character who is beginner-friendly.
- Hikari - Kaya's sister, she is kind and gentle. She is an adept at defending and countering attacks.
- Typhon - A young fighter who is quick and agile and has a range of projectile attacks.
- Garnet - A playful woman who mainly attacks with her legs. She has a somewhat long reach and has a variety of attacks for different situations.
- Orville - A 6'11" tall, large-framed man who is an adept at grappling and rushing attacks.
- Boyd - A short, elderly man who can emit shots of energy from his fingertips.
- Viren - A mysterious, intimidating fighter who uses a wide array of weapons to fight, including a chain, a stungun, and Molotov cocktails.
- Kaya - Hikari's sister, she is somewhat cold, stoic, and serious. She has a versatile range of attacks and defensive maneuvers.
- Aran - A womanizing man, he is useful at almost any range, with projectile attacks and close-range rushing attacks.
- Greed - A large man with a white mane of hair. He is a merciless fighter who has taken the lives of many people. He has a rather long reach and has several rushing attacks.
- Sheryl (PlayStation 2 version only) - A bonus character from The Rumble Fish 2. She is an assassin whose fighting style is based upon wires and setting traps across the screen.
- Hazama (PlayStation 2 version only) - A bonus character from The Rumble Fish 2. He works under PROBE-NEXUS' CEO. He has strong attacks and a somewhat long range.

== Other media ==
=== Soundtrack ===
The Rumble Fish Original Soundtrack (ザ・ランブルフィッシュ・オリジナル・サウンドトラック) was released on November 5, 2004 on ULF Records' sub-label, Sten och Flod. It was composed by Yusuke Kato. The game's theme song, "Stop Your Emotions," feature vocals by Mica, which are sampled for various songs on the soundtrack. The soundtrack also features a collection of voice clips from each character in the game and the announcer, as well as various sound effects.

=== Guidebook ===
A magazine-book called "Undocumented the Rumble Fish ~Daremo Shiranakatta T.R.F.~" (Undocumented the Rumble Fish ～だれも知らなかったT.R.F.～) was published by Enterbrain and was an editorial collaboration between Arcadia Magazine, Sega Sammy Holdings, and Dimps. The publication features illustrations and concept art, background details about the game's characters and setting, and interviews and commentary from the game's staff, as well as technical data for each character.

== See also ==
- The Rumble Fish 2
