= Saint Seiya: The Hades =

2006 video game

- Developer: Dimps
- Publisher: Namco Bandai Games
- Series: Saint Seiya
- Platform: PlayStation 2
- Release: EU: September 29, 2006; JP: February 1, 2007
- Genre: Fighting
- Modes: Single-player, multiplayer

Saint Seiya: The Hades is a three-dimensional fighting video game developed by Dimps and published by Namco Bandai Games for PlayStation 2 released in PAL regions on September 29, 2006 and Japan on February 1, 2007. It is the seventh video game based on the Saint Seiya franchise written by Masami Kurumada.

A direct sequel to Saint Seiya: The Sanctuary and developed by the same team, Saint Seiya: The Hades uses the same graphics engine as its predecessor while improving certain criticisms of gameplay and adding a new narrative arc.

== Plot ==
After several years of peace Hades, God of the Underworld, unleashes a new holy war on Athena and resurrects several Saints that died in previous arcs to add to his army of Specters. Grand Pope Shion and former wielder of the Aries Gold Cloth, is also resurrected and given twelve hours to kill Athena. The Gold Saints and Bronze Saints defend Athena with their lives. After many battles, the resurrected Saints that died in the Sanctuary Arc reach Athena, but upon realization of their true plan Athena commits suicide using Saga's golden dagger.

Shion then explains to the surviving Saints that he and the resurrected Saints never betrayed Athena, but used the time given by Hades to send a message to her without his knowledge. After receiving the message from the resurrected Saga, Athena died by suicide so that her blood would create the Athena Cloth, the only cloth capable of defeating Hades. The Bronze Saints are then tasked with finding Saori in the Underworld and delivering the Athena Cloth to her. But the three Judges of the Underworld, Hades' fearsome lieutenants, stand in their path.

== Gameplay ==
=== Overview ===
Several game modes are available to the player: the "Hades" mode, which acts as a story mode and recounts the events of the Sanctuary and New Holy War story arcs. In this mode, the player embodies one of the Bronze Saints, and fights computer-controlled characters in a precise order, in specific arenas. These battles are interspersed with illustrated and cinematic cutscenes between the characters, as well as real-time sequences, allowing the story to develop between battles. The "1000 days" mode allows the player can fight another player or a computer-controlled character, with no restrictions on characters or arenas. The "Legend" mode features battles against the three judges of the Underworld, Rhadamanthys, Aiacos and Minos. The "Eternal Battle" and "Lightning Battle" modes allow players to fight against waves of enemies and other players respectively, within a limited timeframe.

Finally, the "Saints' Rest" mode is a bonus mode, a gallery in which players can consult various rewards obtained throughout the game, and obtain information and illustrations on figurines and merchandise from the Saint Seiya franchise, such as the Myth Cloth, as well as on the game's soundtrack.

The game features 39 fighters, representing various Saints of Athena or Specters of Hades in a variety of cloths.

=== Characters ===
- Pegasus Seiya (First Bronze Cloth)
  - Pegasus Seiya (Second Bronze Cloth)
  - Pegasus Seiya (Final Bronze Cloth)
  - Sagittarius Seiya
- Dragon Shiryu (First Bronze Cloth)
  - Dragon Shiryu (Second Bronze Cloth)
  - Dragon Shiryu (Final Bronze Cloth)
  - Libra Shiryu
- Cygnus Hyoga (First Bronze Cloth)
  - Cygnus Hyoga (Second Bronze Cloth)
  - Cygnus Hyoga (Final Bronze Cloth)
  - Aquarius Hyoga
- Andromeda Shun (First Bronze Cloth)
  - Andromeda Shun (Second Bronze Cloth)
  - Andromeda Shun (Final Bronze Cloth)
- Phoenix Ikki (First Bronze Cloth)
  - Phoenix Ikki (Second Bronze Cloth)
  - Phoenix Ikki (Final Bronze Cloth)
- Aries Mu
- Taurus Aldebaran
- Gemini Saga
  - Gemini (Masked)
  - Gemini Saga (Specter)
- Cancer Deathmask
  - Cancer Deathmask (Specter)
- Leo Aiolia
- Virgo Shaka
- Libra Dohko
- Scorpio Milo
- Sagittarius Aiolos
- Capricorn Shura
  - Capricorn Shura (Specter)
- Aquarius Camus
  - Aquarius Camus (Specter)
- Pisces Aphrodite
  - Pisces Aphrodite (Specter)
- Gemini Kanon
- Lyra Orpheus
- Eagle Marin
- Ophiuchus Shaina
- Aries Shion
- Wyvern Rhadamanthys
- Garuda Aiacos
- Griffon Minos

=== Battles ===
The beat 'em up phases introduced in the previous version was removed, in favor of a duelling system. The game features real time combat and combo-based gameplay. The strength of attacks is increased by holding down the attack button. The player can also block and parry enemy attacks, giving him the opportunity to counter-attack. Each character has a set of special moves as well as a projection that can bypass the opponent's guard. These special moves require Cosmos, symbolized by a gauge that fills up when the players attacks or is attacked. The player also has the option of staying in place to their own cosmos gauge. New gameplay features include the dash, a sudden forward acceleration that allows the player to surprise his opponent.

To counter one of these special attacks, the defender must press specific keys within a limited time to avoid the attack. If two special attacks meet, the two players then engage in a duel, where they must choose an action in a game that resembles rock-paper-scissors, rather than a duel of speed as in the previous version. The player can also trigger his seventh sense, to enhance his abilities for a short time, replacing the arena with a galactic background, and which also leaves him vulnerable for a few seconds after use.

Once a character's life bar is empty, he or she has a chance to get back up and continue the fight, by rotating the controller's analog sticks as quickly as possible. This mini-game takes the form of encouragement from the goddess Athena, who urges her saints to get up and fight again. For characters obeying Hades, it is Pandora who urges the specter to stand up. If the player fails this mini-game, he loses for good.

Battles take place in arenas, featuring emblematic locations from the saga, such as the various houses of the Zodiac, or the interior of Hades' palace. In these settings, certain elements can be destroyed, such as the columns of the various houses. This has no effect other than aesthetic on the combat.

== Development ==
Following the success of the game Saint Seiya: The Sanctuary, Dimps began development of the sequel again with Ryu Mito as project manager.

Dimps chose not to adapt the Asgard or Poseidon arcs to instead adapt the Hades arc, which coincided with the currently airing Saint Seiya: Hades anime as well as being able to reuse a lot of characters present in the previous game that were not present in the other arcs. However the anime had not finished airing and as a result the game's story mode does not cover the conclusion of the Hades arc. Dimps considered adapting the film Legend of Crimson Youth instead, which has a similar story with resurrected Gold Saints, but the studio felt that this would ultimately harm the project.

Unlike Saint Seiya: The Sanctuary, the voice acting was only recorded in Japanese, with the original voice actors from the series.

== Reception ==
=== Marketing and release ===
Saint Seiya: The Hades was announced by Atari Europe in June 2006, for autumn 2006. At the same time, it was announced that the Hades story arc would be adapted. The game was showcased at Japan Expo 2006, on the Bandai Namco stand, and at the Games Convention in Leipzig in August 2006.

Saint Seiya: The Hades was released in France on September 29, 2006, before the Japanese release in 2007. Like its predecessor, Saint Seiya: The Hades was not distributed in North America.

=== Reviews ===
Ratings overview

Review scores
Publication	Score
Eurogamer	3/10
Gamekult	4/10
Jeuxvideo.com	11/20
PlayStation Official Magazine – UK	5/10

The game was better received by critics than the previous version of the franchise, but nonetheless received mixed reviews, with critics appreciating the faithful adaptation of Masami Kurumada's work, but criticizing the graphics and elements of the gameplay.

Ian Dean, from PlayStation Official Magazine - UK, described the gameplay as simplistic and frustrating. He further wrote that the graphics were disappointing but captured the essence of the series. Luke Albiges, writing for Eurogamer, described the graphics as "shocking by Playstation 2 standards", calling the game a "disgrace".

Maxime Chao, editor-in-chief at JeuxActu, called the game "just as ugly as its predecessor, and the animation just as mechanical", but praised the voice acting and gameplay.

Valérie Précigout of Jeuxvideo.com praised the soundtrack, faithfulness to the source material, and improvements to the gameplay, but felt that the graphics were mediocre and the game lacked poignancy. Précigout revisited the game in the book, Le mythe Saint Seiya: Au Panthéon du manga, describing it as "a series of unpretentious jousts in the most inspired chapter of the saga, without ever managing to restore its emotional force."

Diego Lima, in a 2019 retrospective review of the series for IGN Brazil, considers it to be the best Saint Seiya-inspired game released to date, with a "much more precise" combat system.

Frédéric Luu, writing for Gamekult, wrote that the gameplay is "less soporific than the previous opus, but doesn't reach technical heights". He criticized the 3D engine used for the game but praised the voice acting.

== See also ==
- Saint Seiya: The Sanctuary
- Pegasus Seiya
