= Sonic Advance 3 =

2004 video game

- Developers: Sonic Team; Dimps
- Publisher: Sega: NA/PAL: THQ
- Director: Akinori Nishiyama
- Producers: Yuji Naka; Kouichi Sakita
- Designers: Yukihiro Higashi; Masaaki Yamagiwa
- Programmers: Tatsuaki Nakashima; Hiroki Yoshitake; Kuninori Douno
- Artist: Yuji Uekawa
- Composers: Tatsuyuki Maeda; Kenichi Tokoi; Hideaki Kobayashi; Masaru Setsumaru; Fumie Kumatani
- Series: Sonic the Hedgehog
- Platform: Game Boy Advance
- Release: NA: June 7, 2004; JP: June 17, 2004; EU: June 18, 2004; AU: December 9, 2004
- Genre: Platform
- Modes: Single-player, multiplayer

Sonic Advance 3 (Note: Japanese: ソニックアドバンス3, Hepburn: Sonikku Adobansu Surī) is a 2004 platform game developed by Sonic Team and Dimps and published by Sega for the Game Boy Advance. It is part of the Sonic the Hedgehog series, the sequel to Sonic Advance 2 (2002) and a follow-up to Sonic Battle (2003). The game stars the characters Sonic, Tails, Knuckles, Amy, and Cream as they seek to keep Doctor Eggman and his robot assistant Gemerl from building empires on each of seven chunks Eggman has divided the Earth into.

The game is a fast-paced 2D platformer that takes place across seven zones, each divided into three acts and a boss fight. It allows one or two players to control any two of the five characters; each one has different abilities that allow players varying access to parts of levels. While the graphics are mainly 2D, the game features some 3D rotation effects. It sold quickly upon release and received positive reviews from critics, who praised its gameplay and aesthetics, though they were more divided on the team-up dynamic. The game was later released for the Wii U's Virtual Console in Japan in May 2016.

== Gameplay ==
Game screenshot showing Cream the Rabbit and Knuckles the Echidna. Shown clockwise from bottom left, the game's HUD features lives remaining, an icon reminding the player of Knuckles' R-button ability, rings collected, and time elapsed.

Sonic Advance 3 is a fast-paced 2D platformer featuring similar gameplay to its predecessors. The player controls one of five characters simultaneously with a second one as a sidekick; alternately, a second player joins and one controls each character. The two characters run and jump through a series of seven levels, destroying robots along the way. The player collects rings in levels and boss battles as a form of health: upon being hit by an enemy or harmful obstacle, the player's rings will scatter and can be recollected. The player starts the game with three lives, which they lose if the character is hit with no rings in their possession, crushed, drowns, falls into a bottomless pit, or exceeds an act's ten-minute limit; losing all lives gives the player a game over.

The levels contain features like vertical loops, springs, and rails that the player can grind on. Each level is divided into three acts, punctuated by a boss fight with Doctor Eggman at the end; all three acts, the boss fight, and two minigames that grant the player extra lives are bound by a hub world. Within each act, the player collects Chao creatures; finding 10 in all 3 acts in one zone grants the player access to a special stage, where a Chaos Emerald can be found. Collecting all seven Chaos Emeralds, which can be done after completion of the main campaign, allows the player to fight an extra final boss for the game's true ending.

The player can select any two-member permutation of its five playable characters: Sonic the Hedgehog, Tails, Amy Rose, Knuckles the Echidna, and Cream the Rabbit, provided the two desired characters have been unlocked; only Sonic and Tails are available at the beginning, while the other three must be rescued from Eggman over the course of the game. Each character has a unique ability: Sonic can perform a spinning attack in mid-air, Tails can fly using his two tails as a propeller, Amy can smash enemies with her hammer, Knuckles can glide long distances and climb walls, and Cream can fly using her ears as wings and attack enemies with her Chao friend, Cheese. The second player character can also give powers to the first by pressing the R button; for example, pressing and holding R while Tails is the sidekick blasts both characters into the air. In addition, the second character will collect rings and destroy enemies the first has not. Outside the main game, there are two battle modes for two to four players, in which any of the characters can be selected: racing and Chao collecting.

== Plot ==
Prior to the game's events, Doctor Eggman builds a robotic assistant named Gemerl, using parts from the robot Emerl who was reactivated and later self-destroyed in Sonic Battle. Eggman attempts an experiment using the Chaos Emeralds to perform the Chaos Control technique, but it goes awry and tears the world apart. This action separates Sonic and Tails from Amy, Knuckles, and Cream. Eggman intends to create a segment of his impending empire on each chunk of the planet. Sonic and Tails travel through the game's seven levels to retrieve the Emeralds and undo Eggman's actions.

The final boss fight takes place at the Altar Emerald temple. If the player defeats Eggman there without having all seven Chaos Emeralds, Eggman and Gemerl escape and fall off the edge of the temple. Peace is restored to the world, and Omochao snaps a picture of the five heroes. However, the game alerts the player that the Emeralds must still be collected for the true ending. If the player defeats Eggman at the temple with all the Chaos Emeralds, Gemerl stops running away with Eggman and attacks Sonic, causing the Emeralds to scatter. Gemerl uses them to take on a giant, orb-shaped form, but Sonic also uses their power to attain his Super Sonic form. With Eggman's help, Super Sonic destroys Gemerl. Cream and Vanilla later find Gemerl's broken body on a beach. Gemerl's body is brought to Tails, who repairs and reprograms it. The game ends as Cream plays with the now non-aggressive Gemerl at her mother Vanilla's house.

== Development and release ==
Sonic Advance 3 was published by Sega in Japan and co-published by THQ in North America and Europe. Like Advance 1 and 2, its development was shared by Dimps and Sega subsidiary Sonic Team since the latter was understaffed on employees familiar with the Game Boy Advance hardware. Yuji Naka, then President of Sonic Team, had limited involvement in the development of Sonic Advance 3, and he conceived of the team-up dynamic. While the game is fundamentally 2D, it features some sprite scaling to create pseudo-3D rotation effects. THQ announced the game in a press release on September 11, 2003. The game was later exhibited at E3 2004.

== Reception ==
Reception

Aggregate scores
Aggregator	Score
GameRankings	81.37%
Metacritic	79/100

Review scores
Publication	Score
1Up.com	B
Famitsu	30/40
Game Informer	6.75/10
GamePro	3.5/5
GameSpot	8.4/10
GameSpy	3/5
GameZone	9/10
IGN	9/10
Nintendo Power	3.9/5

Sonic Advance 3 received positive reviews from critics, with respective scores of 79% and 80% at review aggregators Metacritic and GameRankings. GameSpot named it the best Game Boy Advance game of June 2004, and nominated it for the year-end "Best Game Boy Advance Game" and "Best Platformer" awards. It later won Handheld Game of the Year at the 2004 Golden Joystick Awards and sold over 100,000 copies in the United Kingdom alone.

Critics gave mixed opinions to the team-up dynamic. Nich Maragos from 1UP.com celebrated that Sonic Team had "finally [come] up with a way of introducing teamwork and variance between characters that doesn't overwhelm Sonic's bread-and-butter gameplay." Maragos singled this out as the main divider between Advance 3 and Sonic Heroes, a game that he found surprisingly linear in level design considering that it, unlike Advance 3, was in 3D. Maragos, GameSpot's Frank Provo, IGN's Craig Harris, and Game Informer's Lisa Mason appreciated the increase in replayability Sonic's friends brought. However, Mason, as well as reviewer Stardingo from GamePro, thought that they played too much like Sonic and did not add much to the experience. Darryl Vassar of GameSpy took a different point of criticism: he acknowledged the presence of genuinely different character abilities, but perceived that their only purpose was to find Chao, whom he called "pointless". Maragos noted that the "mid-air trick" system from Advance 2 was optional in Advance 3, but spoke positively about its usefulness in locating "hidden areas". Harris argued that such varying team abilities contributed to occasional "cheapness" in the level design, because "most of the characters have absolutely no defense when hopping off items like springboards".

However, the gameplay was mostly well-received otherwise. Vassar acclaimed the level design: he both called the levels "enormous and fast" and praised the slower, smaller sections for "keeping the levels distinct and adding short interludes to the constant running and loops." Harris also praised the "clever" level design. However, Mason found it "simplistic", while Stardingo saw "repetition" in the typical formula. Maragos criticized the bipolar difficulty of the bosses and some minor control issues. Vassar, however, appreciated the return from Advance 2's running-based boss battles to more traditional ones. Further praise from Harris, conversely, went to the multiplayer mode and—along with Stardingo—to the presence of a hub world, which Harris and Stardingo thought gave the game structure.

The game's aesthetics were also well received. Provo stated that "in terms of graphics and sound, Sonic Advance 3 is on par with the best that companies like Nintendo and Konami have had to offer this year". He specifically complimented the character animations, simulations of underwater waves, and in-depth background effects. Vassar praised Advance 3 for continuing Advance 1 and 2's emulation of the "colorful, angular, and stylized look" of the original Sonic the Hedgehog for the Sega Genesis, as well as its "twangy, upbeat tunes". Stardingo thought similarly overall but criticized the "garish" themes of the level Toy Kingdom.
