= Saint Seiya: The Sanctuary =

2005 video game

- Cover art of the European release of Saint Seiya: The Sanctuary by Bandai
- Developer: Dimps
- Publisher: Bandai
- Series: Saint Seiya
- Platform: PlayStation 2
- Release: JP: April 7, 2005; EU: June 30, 2005
- Genre: Fighting
- Modes: Single-player, multiplayer

Saint Seiya: The Sanctuary (聖闘士星矢(セイントセイヤ) 聖域十二宮編, Seinto Seiya: Sankuchuari Jūnikyū Hen), also known as Saint Seiya: Chapter Sanctuary, is a 3D action video game for the PlayStation 2 console based on the Saint Seiya manga series by Masami Kurumada. It was developed by Dimps Corporation and published by Bandai. It was originally released in Japan on April 7, 2005, and in Europe on June 30, 2005. The European release includes translations into English, Italian, French, German and Spanish.

The game received a sequel in 2006 with Saint Seiya: The Hades (聖闘士星矢(セイントセイヤ) 冥王ハーデス十二宮編, Seinto Seiya: Meiou Hadesu Jūnikyū Hen) by the same developers.

== Gameplay ==
The game features a story mode which allows the player to reenact the events of the first few arcs of the manga including the titular Sanctuary Arc. The player can choose to fight either on the side of the protagonists or of the antagonists. It features many CG cinematics of important scenes from the original series, as well as the opening movie from the anime. There is also traditional Training and Versus modes available.

== Development ==
The original Japanese version of Saint Seiya: The Sanctuary, the first 3D game developed for the PlayStation 2 inspired by the Saint Seiya series, was developed by Dimps Corporation and published by Bandai. It was released on April 7, 2005. In Europe, it was released on June 30 of the same year. The game features five immediately playable characters, the Bronze Saint protagonists of the series, and twenty-four hidden characters that play a major part in the Sanctuary arc of Saint Seiya and which can be unlocked throughout the course of the game. The European version of the game includes voice-overs in French as the default audio setting and translations into English, Italian, French, German and Spanish. It also contains alternative music tracks that differ from the Japanese version due to copyright issues. As an added incentive to the purchase of the game before it first came out, Bandai gifted Japanese players who preordered the game via the official PlayStation website with a memory card holder in the shape of the game's "most powerful item in the universe", the golden box of the Sagittarius Cloth.

== Reception ==
Reception

Aggregate score
Aggregator	Score
Metacritic	49/100

Review scores
Publication	Score
Famitsu	23/40
Jeuxvideo.com	8/20
The Times	2/5

The game received "generally unfavorable reviews" according to the review aggregation website Metacritic. In Japan, Famitsu gave it a score of one six, one five, and two sixes for a total of 23 out of 40.
