= Dimps =

Japanese video game company

Dimps Corporation
- Native name: 株式会社ディンプス
- Romanized name: Kabushiki gaisha Dinpusu
- Type: Private
- Industry: Video games
- Founded: 6 March 2000; 26 years ago
- Headquarters: Osaka, Japan
- Area served: Worldwide
- Key people: Takashi Nishiyama (president)
- Products: Sonic series Dragon Ball series Street Fighter series
- Owners: Takashi Nishiyama; Bandai Namco Holdings; Sony Interactive Entertainment; Dimps employee stock-sharing group
- Number of employees: 336 (April 2024)
- Subsidiaries: Safari Games; Dimps Food Entertainment; Dimps Inc.
- Website: www.dimps.co.jp

Dimps Corporation (株式会社ディンプス, Kabushiki-gaisha Dinpusu) is a Japanese video game developer based in Osaka, Japan, with an additional office in Tokyo. It is best known for developing games in the Sonic the Hedgehog, Dragon Ball and Street Fighter franchises. The company was founded on March 6, 2000 by several former SNK and Capcom employees, including Street Fighter, Fatal Fury, Art of Fighting and The King of Fighters co-creator Takashi Nishiyama and Hiroshi Matsumoto.

== History ==
In 2000, Takashi Nishiyama resigned from SNK, and was soon approached with offers for employment by various Tokyo-based companies. At the same time, SNK's core development team members left the company, assuming Nishiyama had plans. Nishiyama decided to form a new company in Osaka, named Sokiac, to avoid having to move his team members and their families. To better reflect its mission to create games for a variety of genres and platforms, the company later changed its name to Dimps, short for "Digital Multi-Platforms". The company was supported by capital from Sammy, Bandai, Sony Computer Entertainment, and Sega.

== Games developed ==
Year	Title	Platform(s)	Publisher	Ref.
2001	Digimon Battle Spirit	WonderSwan Color	Bandai	
2001	Sonic Advance	Game Boy Advance	Sega	
2002	Digimon Tamers: Battle Spirit Ver. 1.5	WonderSwan Color	Bandai	
2002	Shaman King: Spirit of Shamans	PlayStation	Bandai	
2002	One Piece Grand Battle! Swan Colosseum	WonderSwan Color	Bandai	
2002	Inuyasha: A Feudal Fairy Tale	PlayStation	Bandai	
2002	Digimon Battle Spirit 2	WonderSwan Color	Bandai	
2002	Sonic Advance 2	Game Boy Advance	Sega	
2002	Dragon Ball Z: Budokai	PlayStation 2, GameCube	Bandai	
2003	Demolish Fist	Arcade	Sammy	
2003	Dragon Ball Z: Budokai 2	PlayStation 2, GameCube	Bandai	
2003	Naruto: Shinobi no Sato no Jintori Kassen	PlayStation	Bandai	
2003	Konjiki no Gash Bell: Unare! Yūjō no Zakeru	Game Boy Advance	Banpresto	
2004	Seven Samurai 20XX	PlayStation 2	Sammy	
2004	The Rumble Fish	Arcade, PlayStation 2	Sammy	
2004	Gunslinger Girl	PlayStation 2	Marvelous Entertainment	
2004	Shaman King: Funbari Spirits	PlayStation 2	Bandai	
2004	Kirby & the Amazing Mirror	Game Boy Advance	Nintendo	
2004	Mobile Suit Gundam SEED: Tomo to Kimi to Koko de	Game Boy Advance	Bandai	
2004	Sonic Advance 3	Game Boy Advance	Sega	
2004	Dragon Ball: Advanced Adventure	Game Boy Advance	Banpresto	
2004	Konjiki no Gash Bell: Unare! Yūjō no Zakeru 2	Game Boy Advance	Banpresto	
2004	Dragon Ball Z: Budokai 3	PlayStation 2	Bandai	
2005	Data Carddass: Dragon Ball Z	Arcade	Bandai	
2005	The Rumble Fish 2	Arcade	Sammy	
2005	Spikeout: Battle Street	Xbox	Sega	
2005	Saint Seiya: The Sanctuary	PlayStation 2	Bandai	
2005	Yu Yu Hakusho Forever	PlayStation 2	Banpresto	
2005	One Piece	Game Boy Advance	Bandai	
2005	Universal Century Gundam Online	PC	Bandai Namco Games	
2005	Sonic Rush	Nintendo DS	Sega	
2006	Dragon Ball Z: Shin Budokai	PlayStation Portable	Bandai	
2006	Data Carddass: Chō Nenjū Kaisai Card de Ōen! Tamagotchi Cup	Arcade	Bandai	
2006	Data Carddass: Dragon Ball Z 2	Arcade	Bandai	
2006	Crash Boom Bang!	Nintendo DS	Vivendi Universal Games	
2006	Data Carddass: Tamagotchi no Puchi Puchi Omisecchi: Gohiikini	Nintendo DS	Bandai Namco Games	
2006	The Battle of Yu Yu Hakusho: Shitō! Ankoku Bujutsu Kai	Arcade	Banpresto	
2006	Tales of the Tempest	Nintendo DS	Bandai Namco Games	
2007	Saint Seiya: The Hades	PlayStation 2	Bandai Namco Games	
2007	Data Carddass: All Season Saikō! Card de Entry! Tamagotchi Contest	Arcade	Bandai	
2007	Data Carddass: Dragon Ball Z Bakuretsu Impact	Arcade	Bandai	
2007	Nodame Cantabile	Nintendo DS	Bandai Namco Games	
2007	Draglade	Nintendo DS	Banpresto	
2007	Dragon Ball Z: Shin Budokai - Another Road	PlayStation Portable	Bandai Namco Games	
2007	Tamagotchi no Puchi Puchi Omisecchi: Mina Thank You!	Nintendo DS	Bandai Namco Games	
2007	Sonic Rush Adventure	Nintendo DS	Sega	
2008	Tamagotchi to Fushigi na Ehon	Arcade	Bandai	
2008	Data Carddass: Dragon Ball Z W Bakuretsu Impact	Arcade	Bandai	
2008	Dragon Ball Z: Burst Limit	Xbox 360, PlayStation 3	Bandai Namco Games	
2008	Mobile Ops: The One Year War	Xbox 360	Bandai Namco Games	
2008	Street Fighter IV	Arcade	Capcom	
2008	Rosario to Vampire: Tanabata no Miss Youkai Gakuen	Nintendo DS	Capcom	
2008	Draglade 2	Nintendo DS	Bandai Namco Games	
2008	Dragon Ball Z: Infinite World	PlayStation 2	Bandai Namco Games	
2008	Sonic Unleashed	Wii, PlayStation 2	Sega	
2009	Street Fighter IV	Xbox 360, PlayStation 3	Capcom	
2009	Dragonball Evolution	PlayStation Portable	Bandai Namco Games	
2009	Data Carddass: Dragon Ball Kai Dragon Battlers	Arcade	Bandai	
2009	Bleach DS 4th: Flame Bringer	Nintendo DS	Sega	
2009	Tamagotchi no Narikiri Channel	Nintendo DS	Bandai Namco Games	
2009	Battle Spirits: Kiseki no Hasha	PlayStation Portable	Bandai Namco Games	
2010	Nodame Cantabile: Tanoshii Ongaku no Jikan desu	Nintendo DS	Bandai Namco Games	
2010	Super Street Fighter IV	Xbox 360, PlayStation 3	Capcom	
2010	Sonic the Hedgehog 4: Episode I	Xbox 360, PlayStation 3, Wii, iOS, Android	Sega	
2010	Dragon Ball Heroes	Arcade	Bandai	
2010	Sonic Colors	Nintendo DS	Sega	
2010	Super Street Fighter IV: Arcade Edition	Arcade	Capcom	
2011	Data Carddass: Toriko Itadaki Master	Arcade	Bandai	
2011	Data Carddass: Card de Happy! Tamagotchi! Tama Heart Collection	Arcade	Bandai	
2011	Tamagotchi Collection	Nintendo DS	Bandai Namco Games	
2011	Saint Seiya: Sanctuary Battle	PlayStation 3	Bandai Namco Games	
2011	Sonic Generations	Nintendo 3DS	Sega	
2012	Street Fighter X Tekken	Xbox 360, PlayStation 3	Capcom	
2012	Sonic the Hedgehog 4: Episode II	Xbox 360, PlayStation 3, iOS, Android	Sega	
2012	The Rumble Fish 2 for NESiCAxLive	Arcade	Dimps	
2012	Alien vs. Gunners	Android, iOS	Dimps	
2012	Bakemonogatari Portable	PlayStation Portable	Bandai Namco Games	
2012	Ōchimainichi Tamagotchi	Nintendo 3DS	Bandai Namco Games	
2013	Saint Seiya: Brave Soldiers	PlayStation 3	Bandai Namco Games	
2013	Sonic Lost World	Nintendo 3DS	Sega	
2013	Tamagotchi! Session no Dream School	Nintendo 3DS	Bandai Namco Games	
2013	Phantom Gate Chronicle	Android, iOS	Dimps	
2014	Card Create Battle: One Piece Kings	Arcade	Bandai	
2014	Data Carddass: Majin Bone	Arcade	Bandai	
2014	Dragon Ball Heroes: Ultimate Mission 2	Nintendo 3DS	Bandai Namco Games	
2014	Majin Bone: Jikan to Kūkan no Majin	Nintendo 3DS	Bandai Namco Games	
2014	Freedom Wars	PlayStation Vita	Sony Computer Entertainment	
2015	Dragon Ball Xenoverse	PlayStation 4, PlayStation 3, Xbox One, Xbox 360	Bandai Namco Games	
2015	Saint Seiya: Soldiers' Soul	PlayStation 4, PlayStation 3, PC	Bandai Namco Entertainment	
2015	School of Ragnarok	Arcade	Square Enix	
2015	IC Carddass: Dragon Ball	iOS, Android, PC	Bandai	
2016	My Hero Academia: Battle for All	Nintendo 3DS	Bandai Namco Entertainment	
2016	Street Fighter V	PlayStation 4, PC	Capcom	
2016	Dragon Ball Xenoverse 2	PlayStation 4, Xbox One, PC, Google Stadia	Bandai Namco Entertainment	
2016	Super Dragon Ball Heroes	Arcade	Bandai	
2016	anywhereVR	PlayStation VR	Sony Music Entertainment	
2017	Dragon Ball Heroes: Ultimate Mission X	Nintendo 3DS	Bandai Namco Entertainment	
2017	Dragon Ball Xenoverse 2	Nintendo Switch	Bandai Namco Entertainment	
2017	Black Clover: Grimoire Battle	Arcade	Bandai	
2018	Sword Art Online: Fatal Bullet	PlayStation 4, Xbox One, PC	Bandai Namco Entertainment	
2018	Dragon Ball Legends	Android, iOS	Bandai Namco Entertainment	
2018	Soulcalibur VI	PlayStation 4, Xbox One, PC	Bandai Namco Entertainment	
2019	Super Dragon Ball Heroes: World Mission	Nintendo Switch, PC	Bandai Namco Entertainment	
2019	AI Carddass: Zenonzard	Android, iOS	Bandai	
2020	Saint Seiya: Shining Soldiers	Android, iOS	Bandai Namco Entertainment	
2020	Miniyonku Chōsoku Grand Prix	Android, iOS	Bandai Namco Entertainment	
2020	Tabe-O-Ja	Nintendo Switch	Bandai	
2022	Mobile Suit Gundam: Arsenal Base	Arcade	Bandai	
2022	Dragon Ball: The Breakers	PC, PlayStation 4, Xbox One, Nintendo Switch	Bandai Namco Entertainment	
2024	Dragon Ball Xenoverse 2	PlayStation 5, Xbox Series X/S	Bandai Namco Entertainment	
2024	Sword Art Online: Fractured Daydream	PC, PlayStation 5, Xbox Series X/S, Nintendo Switch	Bandai Namco Entertainment	
2024	Dragon Ball Super Divers	Arcade	Bandai	
2025	Freedom Wars Remastered	PC, PlayStation 4, PlayStation 5, Nintendo Switch	Bandai Namco Entertainment	
2027	Dragon Ball Xenoverse 3	PC, PlayStation 5, Xbox Series X/S	Bandai Namco Entertainment	
