= Yu-Gi-Oh! (disambiguation) =

Yu-Gi-Oh! is a manga series by Kazuki Takahashi and its subsequent media franchise.

Yu-Gi-Oh! may also refer to:

- Yu-Gi-Oh! (1998 TV series), an anime series produced by Toei Animation
- Yu-Gi-Oh! (1999 film), a 30-minute film based on the TV series produced by Toei
- Yu-Gi-Oh! Trading Card Game, a trading card game based on the series' fictional Magic & Wizards/Duel Monsters starting in 1999
- Yu-Gi-Oh! Duel Monsters, a 2000 anime series produced by NAS, and known internationally simply as Yu-Gi-Oh!
- Yu-Gi-Oh! R, a 2004 spin-off manga series by Akira Itō
- Yu-Gi-Oh! The Movie: Pyramid of Light, a 2004 theatrical film based on Duel Monsters as commissioned by 4Kids Entertainment, later released in Japan as Yu-Gi-Oh! Duel Monsters: Pyramid of Light
- Yu-Gi-Oh! Duel Monsters GX, a 2004 spinoff of Duel Monsters, known as Yu-Gi-Oh! GX internationally
- Yu-Gi-Oh! Capsule Monsters, a 2006 spinoff of Duel Monsters made by 4Kids
- Yu-Gi-Oh!: The Abridged Series, a 2006 web series made by Bea Billany, known by her screen name "LittleKuriboh"
- Yu-Gi-Oh! 5D's, a 2008 anime series and the fourth Yu-Gi-Oh! anime
- Yu-Gi-Oh! Bonds Beyond Time, a 2010 3D theatrical film combining three of the anime series, originally released in Japan as 10th Anniversary Yu-Gi-Oh! Movie: Super Fusion! Bonds That Transcended Time
- Yu-Gi-Oh! Zexal, a 2010 manga series written by Shin Yoshida and the fifth and sixth Yu-Gi-Oh! anime
- Yu-Gi-Oh! Arc-V, a 2014 anime series and the seventh Yu-Gi-Oh! anime
- Yu-Gi-Oh! The Dark Side of Dimensions, a 2016 theatrical film
- Yu-Gi-Oh! VRAINS, a 2017 anime series and the eighth Yu-Gi-Oh! anime.
- Yu-Gi-Oh! Sevens, a 2020 anime series and the ninth Yu-Gi-Oh! anime.
- Yu-Gi-Oh! Go Rush!!, a 2022 anime series and the tenth Yu-Gi-Oh! anime.

Yu-Gi-Oh! video games:

- Yu-Gi-Oh! Forbidden Memories, 1999 video game.
- Yu-Gi-Oh! Dark Duel Stories, 2000 video game.
- Yu-Gi-Oh! Dungeon Dice Monsters, 2001 video game.
- Yu-Gi-Oh! The Eternal Duelist Soul, 2001 video game.
- Yu-Gi-Oh! The Duelists of the Roses, 2001 video game.
- Yu-Gi-Oh! The Sacred Cards, 2002 video game.
- Yu-Gi-Oh! The Falsebound Kingdom, 2002 video game.
- Yu-Gi-Oh! Worldwide Edition: Stairway to the Destined Duel, 2003 video game.
- Yu-Gi-Oh! World Championship Tournament 2004, 2004 video game.
- Yu-Gi-Oh! The Dawn of Destiny, 2004 video game.
- Yu-Gi-Oh! Duel Links, 2016 video game.
- Yu-Gi-Oh! Master Duel, 2022 video game.
- Yu-Gi-Oh! Early Days Collection, 2025 video game.
