= List of Yu-Gi-Oh! video games =

The following is a list of video games developed and published by Konami, based on Kazuki Takahashi's Yu-Gi-Oh! manga and anime franchise, along with its spin-off series. With some exceptions, the majority of the games follow the card battle gameplay of the real-life Yu-Gi-Oh! Trading Card Game. There are 59 in total.

Platforms: Game Boy, Game Boy Color, Game Boy Advance, GameCube, Mobile, Nintendo DS, Nintendo 3DS, Nintendo Switch, PC, PlayStation, PlayStation 2, PlayStation 3, PlayStation 4, PlayStation 5, PSP, Wii, Xbox, Xbox 360, Xbox One, Xbox Series X/S.

== Games ==
=== 1990s ===
Game	Details
Yu-Gi-Oh! Monster Capsule: Breed and Battle (Note: Japanese: 遊☆戯☆王モンスターカプセル ブリード&バトル, Hepburn: Yū-Gi-Ō! Monsutā Kapuseru: Burīdo ando Batoru) Original release date(s): JP: July 23, 1998; JP: March 28, 2002 (PSOne Books)	Release years by system: 1998—PlayStation
Yu-Gi-Oh! Monster Capsule: Breed and Battle Original release date(s): JP: July 23, 1998; JP: March 28, 2002 (PSOne Books)	Notes: Published and developed by Konami.; Only released in Japan.; 255,490 units sold in Japan.
Yu-Gi-Oh! Duel Monsters (Note: Japanese: 遊☆戯☆王デュエルモンスターズ, Hepburn: Yū-Gi-Ō! Dyueru Monsutāzu) Original release date(s): JP: December 16, 1998	Release years by system: 1998—Game Boy
Yu-Gi-Oh! Duel Monsters Original release date(s): JP: December 16, 1998	Notes: Published and developed by Konami.; Only released in Japan; later localized as part of Early Days Collection.; 1.61 million units sold in Japan.
Yu-Gi-Oh! Duel Monsters II: Dark duel Stories (Note: Japanese: 遊☆戯☆王デュエルモンスターズII 闇界決闘記, Hepburn: Yū-Gi-Ō! Dyueru Monsutāzu Tsū: Ankai Kettō-ki) Original release date(s): JP: July 8, 1999	Release years by system: 1999—Game Boy Color
Yu-Gi-Oh! Duel Monsters II: Dark duel Stories Original release date(s): JP: July 8, 1999	Notes: Published and developed by Konami.; Only released in Japan; later localized as part of Early Days Collection.; 1.45 million units sold in Japan.
Yu-Gi-Oh! Forbidden Memories Original release date(s): JP: December 9, 1999; JP: July 13, 2000 (Konami the Best); NA: March 20, 2002; JP: March 28, 2002 (PSOne Books); EU: November 22, 2002	Release years by system: 1999—PlayStation
Yu-Gi-Oh! Forbidden Memories Original release date(s): JP: December 9, 1999; JP: July 13, 2000 (Konami the Best); NA: March 20, 2002; JP: March 28, 2002 (PSOne Books); EU: November 22, 2002	Notes: Published and developed by Konami.; Known in Japan as Yu-Gi-Oh! True Duel Monsters: Sealed Memories. (Note: Japanese: 遊☆戯☆王真デュエルモンスターズ 封印されし記憶, Hepburn: Yū-Gi-Ō! Shin Dyueru Monsutāzu: Fūinsareshi Kioku); The Game takes place in Ancient Egypt and in modern times. Throughout most of the game, the protagonist is Atem, the Prince of Ancient Egypt. After the high priest Heishin overthrows Pharaoh, he sets out to free Egypt from Heishen's rule. It is later revealed that Heishin seeks to usher the return of Nitemare, an ancient evil wizard. For modern times era, the protagonist is Yugi Mutou. He is taking part in a tournament when he is tasked by Atem with retrieving relics that the Prince needs to complete his quest, which are held by some of the contestants in the tournament.; 510,804 units sold in Japan. 2 million units sold in the United States and Europe. 2,510,804 units sold worldwide.; GameRankings rated the game 62%.; Metacritic rated the game 57/100.

=== 2000s ===
Game	Details
Yu-Gi-Oh! Monster Capsule GB (Note: Japanese: 遊☆戯☆王モンスターカプセルGB, Hepburn: Yū-Gi-Ō! Monsutā Kapuseru JīBī) Original release date(s): JP: April 13, 2000	Release years by system: 2000—Game Boy Color
Yu-Gi-Oh! Monster Capsule GB Original release date(s): JP: April 13, 2000	Notes: Published and developed by Konami.; Only released in Japan; later localized as part of Early Days Collection.; 129,095 units sold in Japan.
Yu-Gi-Oh! Dark Duel Stories Original release date(s): JP: July 13, 2000; NA: March 18, 2002; EU: March 2003	Release years by system: 2000—Game Boy Color
Yu-Gi-Oh! Dark Duel Stories Original release date(s): JP: July 13, 2000; NA: March 18, 2002; EU: March 2003	Notes: Published and developed by Konami.; Known in Japan as Yu-Gi-Oh! Duel Monsters III: Tri-Holy God Advent. (Note: Japanese: 遊☆戯☆王デュエルモンスターズIII 三聖戦神光臨(トライホーリーゴッドアドバント), Hepburn: Yū-Gi-Ō! Dyueru Monsutāzu Surī: Torai-Hōrī Goddo Adobanto)
Yu-Gi-Oh! Duel Monsters 4: Battle of Great Duelists (Note: Japanese: 遊☆戯☆王デュエルモンスターズ4 最強決闘者戦記(バトルオブグレイトデュエリスト), Hepburn: Yū-Gi-Ō! Dyueru Monsutāzu: Batoru obu Gureito Deyuerisuto) Original release date(s): JP: December 7, 2000	Release years by system: 2000—Game Boy Color
Yu-Gi-Oh! Duel Monsters 4: Battle of Great Duelists Original release date(s): JP: December 7, 2000	Notes: Published and developed by Konami.; Only released in Japan; later localized as part of Early Days Collection.; Released in three different versions – Yugi Deck, (Note: Japanese: 遊戯デッキ, Hepburn: Yūgi Dekki) Joey Deck, (Note: Japanese: 城之内デッキ, Hepburn: Jōnouchi Dekki) and Kaiba Deck. (Note: Japanese: 海馬デッキ, Hepburn: Kaiba Dekki); The best-selling Game Boy Color game in Japan, with 2.2 million copies sold in the country by the end of 2001.
Yu-Gi-Oh! Dungeon Dice Monsters (Note: Japanese: 遊☆戯☆王ダンジョンダイスモンスターズ, Hepburn: Yū-Gi-Ō! Danjon Daisu Monsutāzu) Original release date(s): JP: March 21, 2001; NA: February 12, 2003; EU: July 11, 2003	Release years by system: 2001—Game Boy Advance
Yu-Gi-Oh! Dungeon Dice Monsters Original release date(s): JP: March 21, 2001; NA: February 12, 2003; EU: July 11, 2003	Notes: Published and developed by Konami.; 145,354 units sold in Japan.
Yu-Gi-Oh! The Eternal Duelist Soul Original release date(s): JP: July 5, 2001; NA: October 15, 2002	Release years by system: 2001—Game Boy Advance
Yu-Gi-Oh! The Eternal Duelist Soul Original release date(s): JP: July 5, 2001; NA: October 15, 2002	Notes: Published and developed by Konami.; Known in Japan as Yu-Gi-Oh! Duel Monsters 5: Expert 1. (Note: Japanese: 遊☆戯☆王デュエルモンスターズ5 エキスパート1, Hepburn: Yū-Gi-Ō! Dyueru Monsutāzu Faibu: Ekisupāto Wan); In the United States, it sold 1.3 million copies and earned $38 million by August 2006. During the period between January 2000 and August 2006, it was the 9th highest-selling game launched for the Game Boy Advance, Nintendo DS or PlayStation Portable in that country.; 410,534 units sold in Japan. 1,710,534 units sold worldwide.
Yu-Gi-Oh! The Duelists of the Roses Original release date(s): JP: September 6, 2001; JP: December 12, 2002 (Konami the Best); NA: February 16, 2003; EU: September 26, 2003; JP: July 29, 2004 (Konami Dendo Collection); NA: 2004 (Greatest Hits)	Release years by system: 2001—PlayStation 2
Yu-Gi-Oh! The Duelists of the Roses Original release date(s): JP: September 6, 2001; JP: December 12, 2002 (Konami the Best); NA: February 16, 2003; EU: September 26, 2003; JP: July 29, 2004 (Konami Dendo Collection); NA: 2004 (Greatest Hits)	Notes: Published and developed by Konami.; Known in Japan as Yu-Gi-Oh! True Duel Monsters II: Inherited Memories. (Note: Japanese: 遊☆戯☆王真デュエルモンスターズII 継承されし記憶, Hepburn: Yū-Gi-Ō! Shin Dyueru Monsutāzu Tsū: Keishō Sareshi Kioku); 76,248 units sold in Japan. 1.37 million units sold in the United States and Europe. 1,446,248 units sold worldwide.
Yu-Gi-Oh! Duel Monsters 6: Expert 2 (Note: Japanese: 遊☆戯☆王デュエルモンスターズ6 エキスパート2, Hepburn: Yū-Gi-Ō! Dyueru Monsutāzu Shikusu: Ekisupāto Tsū) Original release date(s): JP: December 20, 2001	Release years by system: 2001—Game Boy Advance
Yu-Gi-Oh! Duel Monsters 6: Expert 2 Original release date(s): JP: December 20, 2001	Notes: Published and developed by Konami.; Only released in Japan; later included as part of Early Days Collection.
Yu-Gi-Oh! The Sacred Cards Original release date(s): JP: July 4, 2002; NA: November 4, 2003; EU: February 6, 2004	Release years by system: 2002—Game Boy Advance
Yu-Gi-Oh! The Sacred Cards Original release date(s): JP: July 4, 2002; NA: November 4, 2003; EU: February 6, 2004	Notes: Published and developed by Konami.; Known in Japan as Yu-Gi-Oh! Duel Monsters 7: The Duelcity Legend. (Note: Japanese: 遊☆戯☆王デュエルモンスターズ7 決闘都市伝説, Hepburn: Yū-Gi-Ō! Dyueru Monsutāzu Sebun: Kettōtoshi Densetsu); Soundtrack composed by Norihiko Hibino, Kazuki Muraoka, Sotaro Tojima and Masashi Watanabe.
Yu-Gi-Oh! The Falsebound Kingdom Original release date(s): JP: December 5, 2002; NA: November 4, 2003; EU: November 19, 2004	Release years by system: 2002—GameCube
Yu-Gi-Oh! The Falsebound Kingdom Original release date(s): JP: December 5, 2002; NA: November 4, 2003; EU: November 19, 2004	Notes: Published and developed by Konami.; Known in Japan as Yu-Gi-Oh! Falsebound Kingdom: The Confined Imaginary Kingdom. (Note: Japanese: 遊☆戯☆王フォルスバウンドキングダム 虚構に閉ざされた王国, Hepburn: Yū-Gi-Ō! Forusubaundo Kingudamu: Kyokō ni Tozasareta Ōkoku)
Yu-Gi-Oh! Reshef of Destruction Original release date(s): JP: March 20, 2003; NA: June 29, 2004; EU: August 13, 2004	Release years by system: 2003—Game Boy Advance
Yu-Gi-Oh! Reshef of Destruction Original release date(s): JP: March 20, 2003; NA: June 29, 2004; EU: August 13, 2004	Notes: Published and developed by Konami.; Known in Japan as Yu-Gi-Oh! Duel Monsters 8: Reshef of Destruction. (Note: Japanese: 遊☆戯☆王デュエルモンスターズ8 破滅の大邪神, Hepburn: Yū-Gi-Ō! Dyueru Monsutāzu Eito: Hametsu no Dai Jashin)
Yu-Gi-Oh! Worldwide Edition: Stairway to the Destined Duel Original release date(s): NA: April 15, 2003; JP/EU: April 17, 2003	Release years by system: 2003—Game Boy Advance
Yu-Gi-Oh! Worldwide Edition: Stairway to the Destined Duel Original release date(s): NA: April 15, 2003; JP/EU: April 17, 2003	Notes: Published and developed by Konami.; Updated version of Yu-Gi-Oh! Duel Monsters 6: Expert 2.; Later released in Japan as Yu-Gi-Oh! Duel Monsters International: Worldwide Edition. (Note: Japanese: 遊☆戯☆王デュエルモンスターズインターナショナル ワールドワイドエディション, Hepburn: Yu-Gi-Ō! Dyueru Monsutāzu Intānashonaru: Wārudowaido Edishon); 1.46 million units sold worldwide.; GameRankings rated the game 73%.; Metacritic rated the game 72/100.
Yu-Gi-Oh! Power of Chaos: Yugi the Destiny Original release date(s): EU: November 28, 2003; NA: January 12, 2004	Release years by system: 2003—PC
Yu-Gi-Oh! Power of Chaos: Yugi the Destiny Original release date(s): EU: November 28, 2003; NA: January 12, 2004	Notes: Published and developed by Konami.; Not released in the United Kingdom.
Yu-Gi-Oh! World Championship Tournament 2004 Original release date(s): JP: February 5, 2004; NA: February 10, 2004; EU: March 26, 2004	Release years by system: 2004—Game Boy Advance
Yu-Gi-Oh! World Championship Tournament 2004 Original release date(s): JP: February 5, 2004; NA: February 10, 2004; EU: March 26, 2004	Notes: Published and developed by Konami.; Known in Japan as Yu-Gi-Oh! Duel Monsters Expert 3. (Note: Japanese: 遊☆戯☆王デュエルモンスターズエキスパート3, Hepburn: Yū-Gi-Ō! Dyueru Monsutāzu Ekisupāto Surī); GameRankings rated the game 70%.; Metacritic rated the game 68/100.
Yu-Gi-Oh! Destiny Board Traveler Original release date(s): JP: March 18, 2004; NA: October 26, 2004; EU: September 16, 2005	Release years by system: 2004—Game Boy Advance
Yu-Gi-Oh! Destiny Board Traveler Original release date(s): JP: March 18, 2004; NA: October 26, 2004; EU: September 16, 2005	Notes: Published and developed by Konami.; Known in Japan as Yu-Gi-Oh! Sugoroku's Board Game. (Note: Japanese: 遊☆戯☆王 双六のスゴロク, Hepburn: Yū-Gi-Ō! Sugoroku no Sugoroku); The player has to choose two monsters to place on the "regular" and "star" sides of a dice. Once the player chooses them, they can roll the dice. If it lands on one of the monsters that the player chose, they can move a number of spaces equal to the level of the monster and be asked to duel. If the player decides not to duel, their turn is over. Whoever gets the most star points, which come from successful summonings, or is the last one standing wins. There is also a bonus boss at the end of the game that spawns from the "dark cards."; Most of the series are digital collectible card games, this game is a strategy board game.; Mat Houghton of Game Chronicles said that parents should buy their kids the cards instead of this video game. A GameZone review says that the video game is average and that it doesn't offer much in the way of amusement.
Yu-Gi-Oh! The Dawn of Destiny Original release date(s): NA: March 23, 2004; EU: November 19, 2004; NA: 2005 (Platinum Family Hits)	Release years by system: 2004—Xbox
Yu-Gi-Oh! The Dawn of Destiny Original release date(s): NA: March 23, 2004; EU: November 19, 2004; NA: 2005 (Platinum Family Hits)	Notes: Published and developed by Konami.; GameRankings rated the game 53%.; Metacritic rated the game 53/100.
Yu-Gi-Oh! Power of Chaos: Kaiba the Revenge Original release date(s): NA: April 7, 2004; EU: April 16, 2004	Release years by system: 2004—PC
Yu-Gi-Oh! Power of Chaos: Kaiba the Revenge Original release date(s): NA: April 7, 2004; EU: April 16, 2004	Notes: Published and developed by Konami.; Not released in United Kingdom.
Yu-Gi-Oh! Power of Chaos: Joey the Passion Original release date(s): NA: June 29, 2004; EU: September 24, 2004	Release years by system: 2004—PC
Yu-Gi-Oh! Power of Chaos: Joey the Passion Original release date(s): NA: June 29, 2004; EU: September 24, 2004	Notes: Published and developed by Konami.; Not released in United Kingdom.
Yu-Gi-Oh! Capsule Monster Coliseum (Note: Japanese: 遊☆戯☆王カプセルモンスターコロシアム, Hepburn: Yū-Gi-Ō! Kapuseru Monsutā Koroshiamu) Original release date(s): JP: July 29, 2004; NA: October 26, 2004; EU: February 18, 2005; JP: July 7, 2005 (Konami the Best)	Release years by system: 2004—PlayStation 2
Yu-Gi-Oh! Capsule Monster Coliseum Original release date(s): JP: July 29, 2004; NA: October 26, 2004; EU: February 18, 2005; JP: July 7, 2005 (Konami the Best)	Notes: Published by Konami and developed by WinkySoft.
Yu-Gi-Oh! 7 Trials to Glory: World Championship Tournament 2005 Original release date(s): JP: December 30, 2004; NA: February 15, 2005; EU: February 18, 2005	Release years by system: 2004—Game Boy Advance
Yu-Gi-Oh! 7 Trials to Glory: World Championship Tournament 2005 Original release date(s): JP: December 30, 2004; NA: February 15, 2005; EU: February 18, 2005	Notes: Published and developed by Konami.; Known in Europe as Yu-Gi-Oh! Day of the Duelist: World Championship Tournament 2005.; Known in Japan as Yu-Gi-Oh! Duel Monsters International 2. (Note: Japanese: 遊☆戯☆王デュエルモンスターズインターナショナル2, Hepburn: Yū-Gi-Ō! Dyueru Monsutāzu Intānashonaru Tsū)
Yu-Gi-Oh! Online (Note: Japanese: 遊☆戯☆王ONLINE, Hepburn: Yū-Gi-Ō! ONLINE) Original release date(s): JP/NA: April 11, 2005; EU: Q2 2005; JP/NA: January 1, 2007 (Duel Evolution); JP/NA/EU: March 5, 2010 (Duel Accelerator)	Release years by system: 2005—PC
Yu-Gi-Oh! Online Original release date(s): JP/NA: April 11, 2005; EU: Q2 2005; JP/NA: January 1, 2007 (Duel Evolution); JP/NA/EU: March 5, 2010 (Duel Accelerator)	Notes: Published and developed by Konami; An updated version, known as Yu-Gi-Oh! Online: Duel Evolution, (Note: Japanese: 遊☆戯☆王ONLINE DUELEVOLUTION, Hepburn: Yū-Gi-Ō! ONLINE: DUEL EVOLUTION) was released in 2007.; Another updated version, known as Yu-Gi-Oh! Online: Duel Accelerator, (Note: Japanese: 遊☆戯☆王ONLINE DUELACCELERATOR, Hepburn: Yū-Gi-Ō! ONLINE: DUEL ACCELERATOR) was released in 2010.; Retired on September 30, 2012.
Yu-Gi-Oh! Nightmare Troubadour Original release date(s): JP: July 21, 2005; NA: August 30, 2005; EU: November 18, 2005; JP: June 29, 2006 (Konami the Best)	Release years by system: 2005—Nintendo DS
Yu-Gi-Oh! Nightmare Troubadour Original release date(s): JP: July 21, 2005; NA: August 30, 2005; EU: November 18, 2005; JP: June 29, 2006 (Konami the Best)	Notes: Published and developed by Konami.; Known in Japan as Yu-Gi-Oh! Duel Monsters: Nightmare Troubadour. (Note: Japanese: 遊☆戯☆王デュエルモンスターズ ナイトメアトラバドール, Hepburn: Yū-Gi-Ō! Dyueru Monsutāzu: Naitomea Torabadōru)
Yu-Gi-Oh! GX: Duel Academy Original release date(s): JP: October 13, 2005; NA: January 10, 2006; EU: July 28, 2006	Release years by system: 2005—Game Boy Advance
Yu-Gi-Oh! GX: Duel Academy Original release date(s): JP: October 13, 2005; NA: January 10, 2006; EU: July 28, 2006	Notes: Published and developed by Konami.; Known in Japan as Yu-Gi-Oh! Duel Monsters GX: Aim to be Duel King! (Note: Japanese: 遊☆戯☆王デュエルモンスターズGX めざせデュエルキング！, Hepburn: Yū-Gi-Ō! Dyueru Monsutāzu Jī Ekkusu: Mezase Dyueru Kingu!)
Yu-Gi-Oh! Ultimate Masters: World Championship Tournament 2006 Original release date(s): JP: February 23, 2006; NA: March 14, 2006; EU: March 31, 2006	Release years by system: 2006—Game Boy Advance
Yu-Gi-Oh! Ultimate Masters: World Championship Tournament 2006 Original release date(s): JP: February 23, 2006; NA: March 14, 2006; EU: March 31, 2006	Notes: Published and developed by Konami.; Known in Europe as Yu-Gi-Oh World Championship Tournament 2006.; Known in Japan as Yu-Gi-Oh! Duel Monsters Expert 2006. (Note: Japanese: 遊☆戯☆王デュエルモンスターズエキスパート2006, Hepburn: Yū-Gi-Ō! Dyueru Monsutāzu Ekisupāto Nisenroku); This game contains a severe bug which prevents clearing the Theme Duel "Huge Revolution". Therefore, 99% is the highest total completion rate. Konami apologized for this on their Japanese website.
Yu-Gi-Oh! GX: Tag Force Original release date(s): JP: September 14, 2006; NA: November 14, 2006; EU: March 2, 2007; AU: October 12, 2007	Release years by system: 2006—PlayStation Portable
Yu-Gi-Oh! GX: Tag Force Original release date(s): JP: September 14, 2006; NA: November 14, 2006; EU: March 2, 2007; AU: October 12, 2007	Notes: Published and developed by Konami.; Known in Japan as Yu-Gi-Oh! Duel Monsters GX: Tag Force. (Note: Japanese: 遊☆戯☆王デュエルモンスターズGX タッグフォース, Hepburn: Yū-Gi-Ō! Dyueru Monsutāzu Jī Ekkusu: Taggu Fōsu)
Yu-Gi-Oh! GX: Spirit Caller Original release date(s): JP: November 30, 2006; NA: January 2, 2007; EU: March 23, 2007; AU: April 13, 2007; JP: March 13, 2008 (Konami the Best)	Release years by system: 2006—Nintendo DS
Yu-Gi-Oh! GX: Spirit Caller Original release date(s): JP: November 30, 2006; NA: January 2, 2007; EU: March 23, 2007; AU: April 13, 2007; JP: March 13, 2008 (Konami the Best)	Notes: Published and developed by Konami.; Known in Japan as Yu-Gi-Oh! Duel Monsters GX: Spirit Summoner. (Note: Japanese: 遊戯王デュエルモンスターズGX スピリットサモナー, Hepburn: Yū-Gi-Ō! Dyueru Monsutāzu Jī Ekkusu: Supiritto Samonā)
Yu-Gi-Oh! World Championship 2007 Original release date(s): JP: March 15, 2007; NA: March 20, 2007; EU: April 27, 2007; AU: May 4, 2007	Release years by system: 2007—Nintendo DS
Yu-Gi-Oh! World Championship 2007 Original release date(s): JP: March 15, 2007; NA: March 20, 2007; EU: April 27, 2007; AU: May 4, 2007	Notes: Published and developed by Konami.; Known in Japan as Yu-Gi-Oh! Duel Monsters: World Championship 2007. (Note: Japanese: 遊☆戯☆王デュエルモンスターズ WORLDCHAMPIONSHIP2007, Hepburn: Yū-Gi-Ō! Dyueru Monsutāzu: Wārudo Chanpionshippu Nisennana)
Yu-Gi-Oh! GX: Card Almanac Original release date(s): JP: August 9, 2007; EU: November 28, 2007	Release years by system: 2007—Nintendo DS
Yu-Gi-Oh! GX: Card Almanac Original release date(s): JP: August 9, 2007; EU: November 28, 2007	Notes: Published and developed by Konami.; Known in Japan as Yu-Gi-Oh! Duel Monsters GX: Card Almanac. (Note: Japanese: 遊☆戯☆王デュエルモンスターズGX カードアルマナック, Hepburn: Yū-Gi-Ō! Dyueru Monsutāzu Jī Ekkusu: Kādo Arumanakku); Not released in North America.; Not actually a game, more of an application
Yu-Gi-Oh! GX: Tag Force 2 Original release date(s): NA: September 18, 2007; JP: September 27, 2007; EU: December 7, 2007	Release years by system: 2007—PlayStation Portable
Yu-Gi-Oh! GX: Tag Force 2 Original release date(s): NA: September 18, 2007; JP: September 27, 2007; EU: December 7, 2007	Notes: Published and developed by Konami.; Known in Japan as Yu-Gi-Oh! Duel Monsters GX: Tag Force 2. (Note: Japanese: 遊☆戯☆王デュエルモンスターズGX タッグフォース2, Hepburn: Yū-Gi-Ō! Dyueru Monsutāzu Jī Ekkusu: Taggu Fōsu Tsū)
Yu-Gi-Oh! GX: World Championship 2008 Original release date(s): JP: November 29, 2007; NA: December 4, 2007; EU: March 28, 2008; AU: April 3, 2008; KOR: April 5, 2008	Release years by system: 2007—Nintendo DS
Yu-Gi-Oh! GX: World Championship 2008 Original release date(s): JP: November 29, 2007; NA: December 4, 2007; EU: March 28, 2008; AU: April 3, 2008; KOR: April 5, 2008	Notes: Published and developed by Konami.; Known in Japan as Yu-Gi-Oh! Duel Monsters GX: World Championship 2008. (Note: Japanese: 遊☆戯☆王デュエルモンスターズ WORLDCHAMPIONSHIP2008, Hepburn: Yū-Gi-Ō! Dyueru Monsutāzu: Wārudo Chanpionshippu Nisenhachi)
Yu-Gi-Oh! GX: The Beginning of Destiny Original release date(s): JP: December 6, 2007; EU: December 7, 2007; AU: December 24, 2007; NA: January 8, 2008	Release years by system: 2007—PlayStation 2
Yu-Gi-Oh! GX: The Beginning of Destiny Original release date(s): JP: December 6, 2007; EU: December 7, 2007; AU: December 24, 2007; NA: January 8, 2008	Notes: Published and developed by Konami.; Known in Europe as Yu-Gi-Oh! GX: Tag Force Evolution.; Known in Japan as Yu-Gi-Oh! Duel Monsters GX: Tag Force Evolution. (Note: Japanese: 遊☆戯☆王デュエルモンスターズGX タッグフォースエヴォリューション, Hepburn: Yū-Gi-Ō! Dyueru Monsutāzu Jī Ekkusu: Taggu Fōsu Ebuoryūshon)
Yu-Gi-Oh! GX: Tag Force 3 Original release date(s): JP: November 27, 2008; EU: November 28, 2008; AU: February 19, 2009; NZL: February 28, 2009	Release years by system: 2008—PlayStation Portable
Yu-Gi-Oh! GX: Tag Force 3 Original release date(s): JP: November 27, 2008; EU: November 28, 2008; AU: February 19, 2009; NZL: February 28, 2009	Notes: Published and developed by Konami.; Never released in North America.; Known in Japan as Yu-Gi-Oh! Duel Monsters GX: Tag Force 3. (Note: Japanese: 遊☆戯☆王デュエルモンスターズGX タッグフォース3, Hepburn: Yū-Gi-Ō! Dyueru Monsutāzu Jī Ekkusu: Taggu Fōsu Surī); Subsequent games in the series have been released as part of the Yu-Gi-Oh! 5D's games.
Yu-Gi-Oh! 5D's Stardust Accelerator: World Championship 2009 (Note: Japanese: 遊☆戯☆王5D's スターダストアクセラレーター WORLDCHANPIONSHIP2009, Hepburn: Yū-Gi-Ō! Faibu Dīzu: Wārudo Chanpionshippu Nisenkyū) Original release date(s): JP: March 26, 2009; KOR: April 30, 2009; EU: May 15, 2009; NA: May 19, 2009	Release years by system: 2009—Nintendo DS
Yu-Gi-Oh! 5D's Stardust Accelerator: World Championship 2009 Original release date(s): JP: March 26, 2009; KOR: April 30, 2009; EU: May 15, 2009; NA: May 19, 2009	Notes: Published and developed by Konami.
Yu-Gi-Oh! 5D's: Wheelie Breakers (Note: Japanese: 遊☆戯☆王5D's ウィーリーブレイカーズ, Hepburn: Yū-Gi-Ō! Faibu Dīzu: Uīrī Bureikāzu) Original release date(s): JP: March 26, 2009; NA: May 19, 2009; EU: September 18, 2009; AU: October 14, 2009	Release years by system: 2009—Wii
Yu-Gi-Oh! 5D's: Wheelie Breakers Original release date(s): JP: March 26, 2009; NA: May 19, 2009; EU: September 18, 2009; AU: October 14, 2009	Notes: Published and developed by Konami.; A racing game which uses cards from the card game as power-ups.; IGN gave Yu-Gi-Oh! 5D's: Wheelie Breakers 7.5 out of 10, citing while the game is rather complex, it comes together as a fun experience.
Yu-Gi-Oh! 5D's: Tag Force 4 (Note: Japanese: 遊☆戯☆王5D's タッグフォース4, Hepburn: Yū-Gi-Ō! Faibu Dīzu: Taggu Fōsu Fō) Original release date(s): JP: September 17, 2009; NA: November 18, 2009; EU: January 22, 2010	Release years by system: 2009—PlayStation Portable
Yu-Gi-Oh! 5D's: Tag Force 4 Original release date(s): JP: September 17, 2009; NA: November 18, 2009; EU: January 22, 2010	Notes: Published and developed by Konami.
Yu-Gi-Oh! 5D's Mobile (Note: Japanese: 遊☆戯☆王5D's モバイル, Hepburn: Yū-Gi-Ō! Faibu Dīzu Mobairu) Original release date(s): JP: December 8, 2009	Release years by system: 2009—i-mode, EZweb, Yahoo! Mobile
Yu-Gi-Oh! 5D's Mobile Original release date(s): JP: December 8, 2009	Notes: Published and developed by Konami.; Only released in Japan.; De-listed on March 31, 2011

=== 2010s ===
Game	Details
Yu-Gi-Oh! 5D's World Championship 2010: Reverse of Arcadia (Note: Japanese: 遊☆戯☆王ファイブディーズWORLDCHAMPIONSHIP2010 リバースオブアルカディア, Hepburn: Yū-Gi-Ō! Faibu Dīzu Wārudo Chanpionshippu Nisenjū: Ribāsu obu Arukadia) Original release date(s): JP: February 18, 2010; NA: February 23, 2010; EU: April 9, 2010; KOR: April 30, 2010	Release years by system: 2010—Nintendo DS
Yu-Gi-Oh! 5D's World Championship 2010: Reverse of Arcadia Original release date(s): JP: February 18, 2010; NA: February 23, 2010; EU: April 9, 2010; KOR: April 30, 2010	Notes: Published and developed by Konami.
Yu-Gi-Oh! 5D's: Tag Force 5 (Note: Japanese: 遊☆戯☆王5D's タッグフォース5, Hepburn: Yū-Gi-Ō! Faibu Dīzu: Taggu Fōsu Faibu) Original release date(s): JP: September 16, 2010; NA: October 26, 2010; EU: November 26, 2010	Release years by system: 2010—PlayStation Portable
Yu-Gi-Oh! 5D's: Tag Force 5 Original release date(s): JP: September 16, 2010; NA: October 26, 2010; EU: November 26, 2010	Notes: Published and developed by Konami.
Yu-Gi-Oh! 5D's: Decade Duels (Note: Japanese: 遊☆戯☆王5D's ディケードデュエルズ, Hepburn: Yū-Gi-Ō! Faibu Dīzu: Dikēdo Dyueruzu) Original release date(s): WW: November 9, 2010	Release years by system: 2010—Xbox 360 (XBLA), PlayStation 3 (PSN)
Yu-Gi-Oh! 5D's: Decade Duels Original release date(s): WW: November 9, 2010	Notes: Published by Konami and developed by Other Ocean Interactive.; The game was removed from the service in June 2011.; Later re-released as Yu-Gi-Oh! 5D's Decade Duels Plus.; IGN gave Yu-Gi-Oh! 5D's Decade Duels a score of 4.5, stating newcomers will be frustrated with the grossly overpowered computer opponents while hardcore fans will lament the absence of thousands of cards.
Yu-Gi-Oh! 5D's: Master of the Cards Original release date(s): EU: November 26, 2010; NA: December 7, 2010; JP: April 21, 2011	Release years by system: 2010—Wii
Yu-Gi-Oh! 5D's: Master of the Cards Original release date(s): EU: November 26, 2010; NA: December 7, 2010; JP: April 21, 2011	Notes: Published and developed by Konami.; Later released as Yu-Gi-Oh! 5D's: Duel Transer (Note: Japanese: 遊☆戯☆王5D's デュエルトランサー, Hepburn: Yū-Gi-Ō! Faibu Dīzu: Dyueru Toransā) in North America and Japan.; Initially planned to be released on March 24, 2011 in Japan.
Yu-Gi-Oh! 5D's World Championship 2011: Over the Nexus (Note: Japanese: 遊☆戯☆王5D's WORLDCHAMPIONSHIP2011 オーバー・ザ・ネクサス, Hepburn: Yū-Gi-Ō! Faibu Dīzu Wārudo Chanpionshippu Nisenjūichi: Ōba za Nekusasu) Original release date(s): JP: February 24, 2011; EU: April 1, 2011; KOR: April 28, 2011; NA: May 10, 2011	Release years by system: 2011—Nintendo DS
Yu-Gi-Oh! 5D's World Championship 2011: Over the Nexus Original release date(s): JP: February 24, 2011; EU: April 1, 2011; KOR: April 28, 2011; NA: May 10, 2011	Notes: Published and developed by Konami.; IGN Gave Yu-Gi-Oh! 5D's World Championship 2011: Over the Nexus 6.5 and stated that longtime Yu-Gi-Oh! fans will love all the extras this package has to offer but due to the overwhelming number of cards made available, the DS system is being pushed too far and the fluidity of gameplay suffers.
Yu-Gi-Oh! 5D's: Tag Force 6 (Note: Japanese: 遊☆戯☆王5D's タッグフォース6, Hepburn: Yū-Gi-Ō! Faibu Dīzu: Taggu Fōsu Shikusu) Original release date(s): JP: September 22, 2011; JP: June 25, 2013 (PlayStation Store)	Release years by system: 2011—PlayStation Portable (PlayStation Store)
Yu-Gi-Oh! 5D's: Tag Force 6 Original release date(s): JP: September 22, 2011; JP: June 25, 2013 (PlayStation Store)	Notes: Published and developed by Konami.
Yu-Gi-Oh! Zexal World Duel Carnival Original release date(s): JP: December 5, 2013; EU: June 26, 2014; AU: July 10, 2014; NA: September 25, 2014	Release years by system: 2013—Nintendo 3DS
Yu-Gi-Oh! Zexal World Duel Carnival Original release date(s): JP: December 5, 2013; EU: June 26, 2014; AU: July 10, 2014; NA: September 25, 2014	Notes: Published and developed by Konami.; Known in Japan as Yu-Gi-Oh! Zexal: Clash! Duel Carnival! (Note: Japanese: 遊☆戯☆王ZEXAL 激突！デュエルカーニバル！, Hepburn: Yū-Gi-Ō! Zearu Gekitotsu! Dyueru Kānibaru!); Released as an eShop-exclusive download only game in North America.
Yu-Gi-Oh! Millennium Duels Original release date(s): NA: March 26, 2014	Release years by system: 2014—Xbox 360 (XBLA), PlayStation 3 (PSN)
Yu-Gi-Oh! Millennium Duels Original release date(s): NA: March 26, 2014	Notes: Published by Konami and developed by Other Ocean Interactive.; Duel against characters from all Yu-Gi-Oh! series.; Backwards compatibility with DLC from Yu-Gi-Oh! 5D's Decade Duels Plus.
Yu-Gi-Oh! Duel Arena Original release date(s): NA: May 30, 2014	Release years by system: 2014—PC
Yu-Gi-Oh! Duel Arena Original release date(s): NA: May 30, 2014	Notes: Published by Konami and developed by Miniclip.; Data gathered from the open beta was not used in the final version of the game.; Terminated on March 27, 2015, as indicated by an announcement from Konami.
Yu-Gi-Oh! Duel Generation Original release date(s): NA: October 30, 2014	Release years by system: 2014—iOS, Android
Yu-Gi-Oh! Duel Generation Original release date(s): NA: October 30, 2014	Notes: Published and developed by Konami.; First Yu-Gi-Oh! game released for mobile devices outside of Japan.; Retired in 2020
Yu-Gi-Oh! Arc-V Tag Force Special Original release date(s): JP: January 22, 2015; JP: March 26, 2015 (Taikenban)	Release years by system: 2015—PlayStation Portable (PlayStation Store)
Yu-Gi-Oh! Arc-V Tag Force Special Original release date(s): JP: January 22, 2015; JP: March 26, 2015 (Taikenban)	Notes: Published and developed by Konami.; Only released in Japan.
Yu-Gi-Oh! Legacy of the Duelist Original release date(s): NA: July 30, 2015 (Xbox One and PlayStation 4); NA: December 7, 2016 (Steam)	Release years by system: 2015—Xbox One (XBL), PlayStation 4 (PSN); 2016—PC (Steam)
Yu-Gi-Oh! Legacy of the Duelist Original release date(s): NA: July 30, 2015 (Xbox One and PlayStation 4); NA: December 7, 2016 (Steam)	Notes: Published by Konami and developed by Other Ocean Interactive.; First Yu-Gi-Oh! game released for eighth-generation consoles.
Yu-Gi-Oh! Saikyo Card Battle Original release date(s): JP: July 6, 2016	Release years by system: July 6, 2016—Nintendo 3DS
Yu-Gi-Oh! Saikyo Card Battle Original release date(s): JP: July 6, 2016	Notes: Published and developed by Konami.
Yu-Gi-Oh! Duel Links Original release date(s): JP: November 17, 2016; WW: January 11, 2017	Release years by system: 2016—iOS; 2017—Android, PC (Steam)
Yu-Gi-Oh! Duel Links Original release date(s): JP: November 17, 2016; WW: January 11, 2017	Notes: Published and developed by Konami.; First Yu-Gi-Oh! game to be rated T by the ESRB
Yu-Gi-Oh! Legacy of the Duelist: Link Evolution Original release date(s): JP: April 25, 2019; NA/EU: August 20, 2019	Release years by system: 2019—Nintendo Switch; 2020—PC (Steam), PlayStation 4, Xbox One
Yu-Gi-Oh! Legacy of the Duelist: Link Evolution Original release date(s): JP: April 25, 2019; NA/EU: August 20, 2019	Notes: Published by Konami and developed by Other Ocean Interactive.; Updated version of Legacy of the Duelist.

=== 2020s ===
Game	Details
Yu-Gi-Oh! Rush Duel: Dawn of the Battle Royale Original release date(s): JP: August 12, 2021; NA/EU: December 7, 2021	Release years by system: 2021—Nintendo Switch
Yu-Gi-Oh! Rush Duel: Dawn of the Battle Royale Original release date(s): JP: August 12, 2021; NA/EU: December 7, 2021	Notes: Developed by Matrix Software and published by Konami.; Known in Japan as Yu-Gi-Oh! Rush Duel Saikyo Battle Royale.
Yu-Gi-Oh! Master Duel Original release date(s): WW: January 19, 2022	Release years by system: 2022—Nintendo Switch, PlayStation 4, PlayStation 5, Xbox One, Xbox Series X/S, PC (Steam), iOS, Android
Yu-Gi-Oh! Master Duel Original release date(s): WW: January 19, 2022	Notes: Published and developed by Konami.
Yu-Gi-Oh! Cross Duel Original release date(s): WW: September 6, 2022	Release years by system: 2022—iOS, Android
Yu-Gi-Oh! Cross Duel Original release date(s): WW: September 6, 2022	Notes: Published and developed by Konami.; Terminated on September 4, 2023
Yu-Gi-Oh! RUSH DUEL: Saikyo Battle Royale Let's Go Go Rush Original release date(s): JP: December 1, 2022	Release years by system: 2022—Nintendo Switch: Only released in Japan.
Yu-Gi-Oh! RUSH DUEL: Saikyo Battle Royale Let's Go Go Rush Original release date(s): JP: December 1, 2022	Notes: Developed by Matrix Software and published by Konami.; Comes in two editions: A free-to-play Standard Edition and a paid Special Edition.
Yu-Gi-Oh! Early Days Collection Original release date(s): WW: February 27, 2025	Release years by system: 2025—Nintendo Switch, PC (Steam)
Yu-Gi-Oh! Early Days Collection Original release date(s): WW: February 27, 2025	Notes: Developed by Digital Eclipse and published by Konami.; Compilation of the first 14 handheld Yu-Gi-Oh! games.
