= List of highest-grossing media franchises =

This is a list of media franchises that have grossed more than $2 billion.

== List ==
franchises
Franchise	Year of inception	Total revenue (est. US$)	Revenue breakdown (est. US$)	Original medium	Creator(s)	Owner(s)
=== $50 billion+ ===
Pokémon	1996	$130.7 billion (Note: Pokémon franchise: The Pokémon Company no longer mentions how much the franchise has earned on their website, as of May 2019; $10 billion revenue up until 2001; Over ¥6 trillion ($55 billion) revenue up until March 2017)	Retail sales – $119.3 billion (Note: Pokémon retail sales: Until 2005 – $25 billion; 2006 – $1.3 billion; 2007 – $1.4 billion; 2008 – $1.4 billion; 2009 – $1.4 billion; 2010 – $2.5 billion; 2011 – $1.5 billion; 2012 – $1.6 billion; 2013 – $1.5 billion; 2014 – $2 billion; 2015 – $2.1 billion; 2016 – $3.3 billion; 2017 – $3.5 billion; 2018 – $2.98 billion; 2019 – $4.2 billion; 2020 – $5.1 billion; 2021 – $8.5 billion; 2022 – $11.6 billion; 2023 – $10.8 billion; 2024 – $12 billion; 2025 – $15.7 billion); Mobile games – $10.23 billion (Note: Pokémon Go – $8.8 billion: Pokémon Duel, Pokémon Shuffle Mobile, Magikarp Jump – $48.6 million; Pokémon Quest – $10 million; Pokémon Masters – $75 million; Pokémon TCG Pocket – $1.3 billion); Box office – $1.16 billion; Home video – $40 million (Note: Pokémon home video sales: Detective Pikachu: DVD sales as of July 21, 2025 – $18.3 million; Blu-ray as of July 21, 2025 – $21.8 million); Jet aircraft livery sales – $3 million (Note: Pokémon Jet aircraft sales in Japan as of 2004 – ¥300 million ($3 million))	Video game	Satoshi Tajiri	The Pokémon Company (Nintendo, Creatures, Game Freak) (copyright; trademark in Japan); Nintendo (trademark globally)
Mickey Mouse & Friends	1928	$61.2 billion	Retail sales – $60.66 billion (Note: Mickey Mouse & Friends retail sales: 2002 – $4.7 billion; 2003 – $5.8 billion; 2005 – $6 billion; 2007 – $6 billion; 2010 – $9 billion; 2011 – $750 million in North America.; 2012 – $4.122 billion; 2013 – $4.568 billion; 2014 – $4.719 billion; 2015 – $4.262 billion; 2016 – $4.247 billion; 2017 – $3.233 billion; 2018 – $3.265 billion); Box office – $226.7 million (Note: Fantasia (1940) – $83 million; DuckTales the Movie: Treasure of the Lost Lamp (1990) – $18.1 million; A Goofy Movie (1995) – $35 million; Fantasia 2000 (1999) – $90 million; Chip 'n Dale: Rescue Rangers (2022) – $623,190); VHS & DVD – $323 million (Note: 1991 VHS release of Fantasia earned $209 million in sales; Others since 2001 – $114 million)	Animated cartoon	Walt Disney; Ub Iwerks	The Walt Disney Company
Winnie-the-Pooh (original books and Disney franchise)	1924 (original books); 1966 (Disney franchise)	$50.2 billion	Retail sales – $49.66 billion (Note: Winnie the Pooh retail sales: 1986 – $100 million (Note: Clothing line only); 1997 – $4 billion; 1998 – $316 million (Note: licensed-toy sales only); 2002– $7 billion; 2003 – $5.6 billion; 2005 – $6 billion; 2006 – $6.9 billion; 2010 – $1.1 billion (Note: United States and Canada); 2011 – $1.09 billion in North America.; 2012 – $3.17 billion; 2013 – $2.808 billion; 2014 – $2.732 billion; 2015 – $2.74 billion; 2016 – $2.791 billion; 2017 – $1.649 billion; 2018 – $1.675 billion); DVD & Blu-ray – $40 million; Box office – $545 million	Book	A. A. Milne and E. H. Shepard (original books); Walt Disney Animation Studios (Disney franchise)	The Walt Disney Company
=== $20–49 billion ===
Star Wars	1977	$46.7 billion (Note: $6.6 billion franchise revenue up until May 1987.)	Merchandise sales – $29.057 billion (Note: Up until 2006 – $12 billion; Original trilogy – $5.8 billion; Prequel trilogy – $6.2 billion; The Phantom Menace – $2 billion; Attack of the Clones – $1.2 billion; Revenge of the Sith – $3 billion; 2012 – $2.266 billion; 2013 – $2.200 billion; 2014 – $2.374 billion; 2015 – $2.842 billion; 2016 – $3.049 billion; 2017 – $2.403 billion; 2018 – $1.923 billion); Box office – $10.343 billion; Home video – $1.275 billion; Video games – $4.01 billion (Note: Star Wars video games: Up until December 2015 – $3 billion; Mobile (2013–2019) – $1 billion); Book sales – $1.82 billion; TV revenue – $280 million (Note: Star Wars television revenue: Clone Wars (as of 2015) – $4.5 million; Television rights (2016) – $275 million)	Film	George Lucas	Lucasfilm (The Walt Disney Company)
Disney Princess	2000	$45.4 billion	Retail sales – $45.468 billion (Note: 2000 – $200 million; 2001 – $300 million; 2002 – $1 billion; 2003 – $1.3 billion; 2004 – $2 billion; 2005 – $3 billion; 2006 – $3 billion; 2007 – $4 billion; 2008 – $4 billion; 2009 – $3.7 billion.; 2010 – $3.250 billion; 2011 – $1.6 billion; 2012 – $2.896 billion; 2013 – $2.885 billion; 2014 – $2.568 billion.; 2015 – $2.635 billion; 2016 – $2.724 billion; 2017 – $2.133 billion; 2018 – $1.686 billion); Home entertainment – $14.7 million	Animated films	Andy Mooney	The Walt Disney Company
Call of Duty	2003	$40 billion	Video games – $40 billion	Video game	Infinity Ward	Activision Blizzard (Xbox)
Anpanman	1973	$38.4 billion	Retail sales – $38.42 billion (Note: ¥150 billion+ annual sales for nearly 30 years - ¥3,750 billion+ ($38.42 billion+)); Museum – $14.5 million (Note: ¥1.5 billion ($14.51 million).)	Picture book	Takashi Yanase	Froebel-kan (Toppan Printing Co.)
Marvel Cinematic Universe (MCU)	2008	$37.5 billion	Box office – $34.7 billion (Note: MCU films – $32.367 billion; Inhumans (premiere) – $3.5 million); Home entertainment – $2.786 billion (Note: Home media – $2.661 billion; Black Widow (digital sales) – $125 million)	Film	Marvel Studios; Stan Lee; Jack Kirby	Walt Disney Studios (The Walt Disney Company); Sony Pictures (Spider-Man films)
Barbie	1987 (Note: The Barbie brand began expansion to a media franchise in 1987 with two TV specials and video games, culminating with the launch of the CGI/computer-animated film series. Since 2012, the franchise expanded even further to include television shows, web series, short films and streaming media content. Earlier Excluding pre-1987 Barbie toy sales.)	$36.3 billion	Merchandise sales – $34.6 billion (Note: 1987 – $430 million; 1988 – $450 million; 1989 – $600 million; 1990 – $700 million; 1991 – $840 million; 1992 – $1 billion; 1993 – $1 billion; 1994 – $1 billion; 1995 – $1.2 billion; 1996 – $1.7 billion; 1997 – $1.9 billion; 1998 – $1.9 billion; 1999 – $1.5 billion; 2000 – $1.5 billion; 2001 – $1.5 billion; 2002 – $1.52 billion; 2003 – $3.6 billion; 2004 – $3 billion; 2005 – $1 billion; 2008 – $3.3 billion; 2010 – $550 million; 2012 – $1.2 billion; 2013 – $1.2 billion; 2014 – $1.1 billion; 2016 – $1 billion); Home video sales – $328 million; Box office – $1.439 billion	Television special	Ruth Handler	Mattel
Wizarding World (Harry Potter)	1997	$35.1 billion	Box office – $9.656 billion; Book sales – $8.0777 billion (Note: Books - $7.7 billion, 1997–2016 Ebooks and Audiobooks (Pottermore): $127.1 million (£95.1 million), 2016–2018; $40.3 million (£31.5 million), 2019; $149 million (£110.7 million), 2020–2022; $61.3 million (£48.2 million), 2022–2023); Merchandise sales – $7.11 billion (Note: Harry Potter merchandise: 2002 – $2.9 billion; 2003 – $2.8 billion; 2010 – $300 million; 2011 – $100 million; 2017–2018 – $1.01 billion); Home entertainment – $4.032 billion (Note: $3.9 billion Harry Potter home entertainment revenue up until 2014. $71 million Fantastic Beasts and Where to Find Them DVD and Blu-ray sales since 2017. $44 million Fantastic Beasts: The Crimes of Grindelwald DVD and Blu-ray sales since 2018. $17 million Fantastic Beasts: The Secrets of Dumbledore DVD and Blu-ray sales since 2022 .); Video games – $3.5 billion (Note: Harry Potter video games: Up until 2014 – $1.5 billion; Mobile games (2018 to October 2022) – $1 billion; Hogwarts Legacy – $1 billion); TV revenue – $1 billion; Studio tour – $1.2 billion; Stage play – $566 million (Note: Palace Theater, London (presales), $32 million Broadway, New York (2018–2020), $174 million Broadway, New York (2021–present), $358 million Curran Theater, San Francisco, $2 million)	Novel	J. K. Rowling	J. K. Rowling (books); Warner Bros. (Skydance Corporation) (films)
Hello Kitty	1974	$33.5 billion	Merchandise sales – $33.5 billion (Note: 1986 – $477.8 million; 1987 – $506 million; 2000 – $1.2 billion; 2002 – $1 billion; 2003 – $4 billion; 2005 – $500 million; 2010 - $750 million (Note: United States and Canada); 2011 – $4.100 billion; 2012 – $4.039 billion; 2013 – $8 billion; 2015 – $3.756 billion; 2017 – $2.663 billion; 2018 – $2.645 billion); Box office – $61,487	Cartoon character	Yuko Shimizu; Shintaro Tsuji	Sanrio
Honor of Kings	2015	$30 billion	Mobile game – $30 billion	Video game	TiMi Studio Group	Tencent Games
Batman	1939	$29.9 billion	Retail sales – $21.329 billion (Note: Batman retail sales: As of 2012 – $16 billion; Merchandise sales during 2013–2018 – $5.017 billion; 2013 – $494 million; 2014 – $578 million; 2015 – $982 million; 2016 – $1.1 billion; 2017 – $1.024 billion; 2018 – $839 million; Home video sales between September 2012 and January 2020 – $312 million); Home video – $1.212 billion (Note: $650 million VHS and DVD sales for Batman, Batman Returns, Batman Forever and Batman & Robin up until 2005. $562 million DVD and Blu-ray sales for films released since 2008.); Box office – $7.051 billion (Note: See List of highest-grossing franchises and film series); TV revenue – $340 million (Note: Batman television revenue: 1960s TV series – $300 million; 1989 film – $40 million)	Comic book	Bob Kane; Bill Finger	DC Entertainment (Skydance Corporation)
Spider-Man	1962	$26.8 billion	Merchandise sales – $14.526 billion (Note: 2002 – $2.7 billion; 2003 – $1.3 billion; 2010 – $590 million; 2011 – $325 million; 2012 – $1.285 billion; 2013 – $1.333 billion; 2014 – $1.453 billion; 2015 – $1.512 billion; 2016 – $1.551 billion; 2017 – $1.402 billion; 2018 – $1.075 billion); Box office – $11.125 billion (Note: Box office gross of Spider-Man films: 2002–2023 films – $8.974 billion; Sony's Spider-Man Universe – $2.15 billion); Home video – $787 million (Note: Spider-Man home video revenue: 2002–2023 films - $665 million; Sony's Marvel Universe - $121 million; The Spectacular Spider-Man – $1 million); Video games – $210 million (Note: Spider-Man video games: Spider-Man: The Movie (2002) – $100 million; Spider-Man 2 (2004) – $110 million); Broadway musical – $212 million	Comic book	Stan Lee; Steve Ditko	Marvel Entertainment (The Walt Disney Company); Sony Pictures (films)
Transformers	1984	$25 billion (Note: ¥2 trillion ($25 billion) Transformers franchise revenue up until 2011.)	Merchandise sales – $3.97 billion (Note: Transformers merchandise sales: 1984–1992 – $1 billion US toy sales; 2012 – $314 million; 2013 – $304 million; 2014 – $410 million; 2015 – $430 million; 2016 – $446 million; 2017 – $652 million; 2018 – $423 million); Box office – $5.260 billion; Home entertainment – $906 million	Toy line	Shōji Kawamori; Kazutaka Miyatake	Takara Tomy; Hasbro
Naruto	1999	$22.8 billion	Retail sales – $20 billion; Video games – $2.8 billion	Manga	Masashi Kishimoto	Masashi Kishimoto (manga) Shueisha (Hitotsubashi Group); Studio Pierrot (anime) TV Tokyo (anime)
Dungeon Fighter Online (DFO)	2005	$22 billion	Computer game – $22 billion	Video game	Neople	Nexon; Tencent
Cars	2006	$21.5 billion	Merchandise sales – $19.114 billion (Note: $10 billion up until 2011. $2.527 billion in 2012. $2.3 billion in 2013. $2.025 billion in 2014. $1 billion in 2015. $588 million in 2016. $674 million in 2017.); Box office – $1.799 billion (Note: Cars series – $1.405 billion; Planes series – $394 million); DVD & Blu-ray sales – $634 million (Note: Cars series – $513 million; Planes series – $121 million)	Animated film	Pixar; John Lasseter	Pixar (The Walt Disney Company)
Candy Crush	2012	$20 billion	Video games – $20 billion	Video game	King	Activision Blizzard (Xbox)
=== $10–19 billion ===
Paw Patrol	2013	$18.4 billion	Retail sales – $18 billion; Box office – $373.7 million; Home media – $39 million	Animated series	Keith Chapman	Spin Master
Looney Tunes	1930	$17.46 billion	Retail sales – $16.777 billion (Note: Looney Tunes franchise retail sales: 1978 – $100 million; 1993 – $1 billion; 1994 – $2 billion; 1995 – $2.5 billion; 1996 – $5 billion; 2010 – $603 million; 2012 – $624 million; 2013 – $617 million; 2014 – $628 million; 2015 – $639 million; 2016 – $645 million; 2017 – $624 million; 2018 – $597 million; Space Jam – $1.2 billion); Box office – $482 million (Note: Bugs Bunny's 3rd Movie: 1001 Rabbit Tales (1992) – $78,350; 1995 Bugs Bunny Film Festival (1995) – $19,587; Space Jam (1996) – $250 million; 1998 Bugs Bunny Film Festival (1998) – $413,076; Looney Tunes: Back in Action (2003) – $68.5 million; Space Jam: A New Legacy (2021) – $162 million); Home video sales – $209 million	Animated cartoon	Leon Schlesinger; Hugh Harman; Rudolf Ising	Warner Bros. (Skydance Corporation)
Teenage Mutant Ninja Turtles	1984	$17.4 billion	Merchandise sales – $15.4 billion (Note: Up until 1994 – $6 billion; 2003–2005 – $1 billion; 2009–2012 – $475 million; 2012–2022 – $8 billion); Box office – $1.329 billion; Video games – $450 million; DVD & Blu-ray sales – $154 million; Video rentals – $67.65 million	Comic book	Kevin Eastman; Peter Laird	Nickelodeon (Skydance Corporation)
SpongeBob SquarePants	1999	$16.6 billion	Retail sales – $16 billion (Note: $16 billion up until 2024.); Box office – $630 million; Musical Theater – $37 million	Animated series	Stephen Hillenburg	Nickelodeon (Skydance Corporation)
Toy Story	1995	$16 billion (Note: up until 2026)	Retail sales – $11 billion (Note: Toy Story 3 (2010) – $10 billion up until 2014.; 2015 – $1 billion); Box office – $3.273 billion; VHS sales – $290 million; DVD & Blu-ray sales – $250 million	Animated film	Pixar; John Lasseter	The Walt Disney Company
The Lion King	1994	$15.9 billion	Musical theatre – $8.1 billion; Merchandise sales – $3 billion (Note: $3 billion up until 1998.); Box office – $3.352 billion; Home entertainment – $1.5 billion	Animated film	Roger Allers; Rob Minkoff	The Walt Disney Company
Dora the Explorer	2000	$15.8 billion	Retail sales – $15.413 billion (Note: Up until 2014 – $13 billion; 2015 – $933 million; 2016 – $915 million; 2017 – $565 million); Home video sales – $250 million (Note: Home entertainment sales up until 2005); Box office – $118 million	Animated series	Chris Gifford; Valerie Walsh; Eric Weiner	Nickelodeon (Skydance Corporation)
Pac-Man	1980	$15.43 billion	Video games – $14.407 billion (Note: Pac-Man video game revenue: Pac-Man – $12.81 billion; Ms. Pac-Man – $1.5 billion; Other games (US) – $97.3 million; Pac-Mania (arcade) – $2.82 million; Microsoft Return of Arcade (PC) – $9.5 million; Pac-Man Collection (GBA) – $25 million; Namco Museum (GBA) – $37 million; Pac-Man World 2 (PS2) – $23 million); Merchandise & licensing – $1 billion; Music sales – $32 million (Note: Buckner & Garcia's Pac-Man Fever album and "Pac-Man Fever" single – $32 million)	Video game	Toru Iwatani; Namco	Bandai Namco Entertainment (Bandai Namco Holdings)
Peanuts	1950	$14.4 billion	Retail sales – $14.19 billion (Note: Peanuts retail sales: 1986 – $1 billion; 1997 – $1.1 billion; 2010 – $2 billion; US sales in 2011 – $600 million; 2012 – $1.141 billion; 2013 – $1.167 billion; 2014 – $1.194 billion; 2015 – $1.3 billion; 2016 – $1.468 billion; 2017 – $1.558 billion; 2018 – $1.662 billion); Box office – $267 million; DVD & Blu-ray sales – $35 million	Comic strip	Charles M. Schulz	Peanuts Holdings (Sony)
Avengers	1963	$14.3 billion	Box office – $7.707 billion; Merchandise sales – $6.596 billion (Note: 2013 - $325 million; 2014 - $1 billion; 2015 – $1.004 billion; 2016 – $1.242 billion; 2017 – $1.227 billion; 2018 – $1.798 billion); DVD & Blu-ray sales – $18 million (Note: Avengers DVD and Blu-ray sales: Ultimate Avengers – The Movie (2006) – $6.7 million; Ultimate Avengers 2: Rise of the Panther (2006) – $7.8 million; The Next Avengers: Heroes of Tomorrow (2008) – $4.1 million)	Comic book	Stan Lee; Jack Kirby	Marvel Entertainment (The Walt Disney Company)
Grand Theft Auto (GTA)	1997	$14.1 billion	Video games – $10.3 billion (Note: Grand Theft Auto: Grand Theft Auto III (2001) - $350 million; Grand Theft Auto: Vice City (2002) - $300 million; Grand Theft Auto: San Andreas (2004) - $600 million; Grand Theft Auto: Liberty City Stories (2005) - $48 million (United States); Grand Theft Auto IV (2008) - $500 million; Grand Theft Auto V (2013) - $8.5 billion; Grand Theft Auto VI (2026) - $3.79 billion; Mobile revenue - $100 million)	Video game	DMA Design; David Jones; Mike Dailly	Rockstar Games (Take-Two Interactive)
Frozen	2013	$13.9 billion	Merchandise sales – $10.588 billion (Note: 2014 – $5 billion; 2015 – $1.573 billion; 2016 – $1.598 billion; 2017 – $1.404 billion; 2018 – $1.013 billion); Box office – $2.694 billion; DVD & Blu-ray sales – $502 million; Musical theatre – $155 million	Animated film	Chris Buck; Jennifer Lee; Hans Christian Andersen	The Walt Disney Company
Space Invaders	1978	$13.9 billion	Video game – $13.93 billion (Note: Arcade and software revenue up until 2016)	Video game	Tomohiro Nishikado	Taito (Square Enix)
Warcraft	1994	$12.4 billion	Video games – $12 billion (Note: Revenue up until 2016); Box office – $438 million; Home entertainment – $17.4 million	Video game	Blizzard Entertainment	Activision Blizzard (Xbox)
Despicable Me (Minions)	2010	$12.3 billion	Retail sales – $6 billion; Box office – $5.61 billion; DVD & Blu-ray sales – $725 million	Animated film	Sergio Pablos	Illumination; Universal Pictures (Comcast)
Star Trek	1966	$11.2 billion (Note: $7.8 billion franchise revenue up until December 1998.)	Retail sales – $5.253 billion (Note: Up until 2000 - $4 billion; 2010 – $150 million; 2012-2013 – $275 million; 2014 – $148 million; 2015 – $149 million; 2016 – $159 million; 2017 – $180 million; 2018 – $192 million); TV revenue – $2.3 billion; Box office – $2.266 billion; VHS sales – $1 billion; DVD & Blu-ray sales – $426 million	Television series	Gene Roddenberry	Paramount Skydance (Skydance Corporation)
Dragon Ball	1984	$10.7 billion	Merchandise sales – $6 billion (Note: Up until 2011 - $5 billion; 2022-2023 - ¥139 billion($1 billion)); Box office - $317 million; Home video - $29 million; Video games – $4.4 billion (Note: Dragon Ball Z: The Legacy of Goku (2002) - $35 million (United States); Dragon Ball Z: Taiketsu (2003) - $14 million (United States); Dragon Ball Z: The Legacy of Goku II (2003) - $16 million (United States); Dragon Ball Z: Dokkan Battle (2015) - $4.2 billion; Dragon Ball Z Legends – $140 million)	Manga	Akira Toriyama	Akira Toriyama (Bird Studio); Shueisha (Hitotsubashi Group) (manga); Toei Animation (anime) Fuji TV (anime); Bandai Namco
Street Fighter	1987	$10.7 billion	Video Game – $10.61 billion; Box office & home video – $211 million (Note: Street Fighter box office and home video revenue: Street Fighter II: The Animated Movie (1994) $16 million; Japan box office – $16 million; Street Fighter (1994) – $99.4 million; Box office - $99.4 million; Street Fighter: The Legend of Chun-Li (2009) – $18,832,933; Worldwide box office – $12,764,201; US DVD sales – $6,068,732)	Video game	Takashi Nishiyama; Hiroshi Matsumoto	Capcom
Demon Slayer: Kimetsu no Yaiba	2016	$10.1 billion	Retail sales- $8.74 billion; Box office – $1.42 billion; Home media – $4.8 million	Manga	Koyoharu Gotōge	Koyoharu Gotōge and Shueisha (Hitotsubashi Group) (manga) ufotable (anime) Aniplex (anime)
Jurassic Park	1990	$10.1 billion	Box office – $6.343 billion; Merchandise sales – $3.2 billion (Note: Jurassic Park merchandise: Up until 2001 – $2.5 billion; 2017 – $353 million; 2018 – $353 million); Home video sales – $418 million (Note: $545 million up until 2004. $414 million since 2015.); TV revenue – $150 million	Novel	Michael Crichton	Alfred A. Knopf (novel); Universal Pictures (Comcast); Amblin (Reliance / Hasbro / Alibaba) (film)
Rilakkuma	2003	$10 billion	Merchandise sales – $10 billion	Manga	Aki Kondo	San-X
Monster Strike	2013	$10 billion	Mobile Game- $10 billion (Note: Monster Strike: Up until October 2018 – $7.2 billion; November 2018 – $52 million+; December 2018 – $68 million+; 2019 – $932 million; 2020 – $958 million; 2021 – $702 million; Up to September 2022 – $10 billion)	Video game	Yoshiki Okamoto	Mixi
=== $5–9 billion ===
James Bond	1953	$9.75 billion	Box office – $7.879 billion; Home entertainment – $373 million; Merchandise sales – $1 billion (Note: Up until 1997); Video games – $500 million (Note: GoldenEye – $500 million)	Novel	Ian Fleming	Danjaq; Ian Fleming Publications (books); Metro-Goldwyn-Mayer (Amazon MGM Studios) (films)
Mario	1981	$9.74 billion	Video games – $7.33 billion (Note: Mario video games: Up until 2002 – $7 billion; Mario Golf: Toadstool Tour (2003) – $26 million(United States); Mario & Luigi: Superstar Saga (2003) – $30 million(United States); Super Mario 64 DS (2004) – $42 million(United States); Mario Kart DS (2005) – $31 million(United States); Mario Kart Tour (2019 to April 2021) – $200 million; Dr. Mario World (2019) – $4.8 million); Box office – $2.39 billion (Note: Mario franchise box office: Super Mario Bros. (1993) – $38.9 million; The Super Mario Bros. Movie (2023) – $1.360 billion; The Super Mario Galaxy Movie (2026) – $1 billion); Home media – $21 million	Video game	Shigeru Miyamoto; Nintendo R&D1	Nintendo
Angry Birds	2009	$9.54 billion	Merchandise sales – $8.647 billion (Note: 2011 - $600 million; 2012 - $1.849 billion; 2013 - $1.882 billion; 2014 - $1.16 billion; 2015 - $1.065 billion; 2016 - $1.277 billion; 2017 - $814 million); Box office – $503 million; Video games – $362.5 million (Note: Angry Birds 2 (2015) - $332.5 million.; Angry Birds Evolution (2017) - $30 million.); DVD & Blu-ray sales – $35 million	Video game	Jaakko Iisalo	Rovio Entertainment (Sega Sammy Holdings)
The Railway Series / Thomas & Friends	1945 (The Railway Series); 1984 (Thomas & Friends)	$9.12 billion	Retail sales – $9.107 billion (Note: Up until 1997 - $1 billion; 2000 - $260 million in North America; 2010 - $1.2 billion; 2011 - $390 million; 2012 - $998 million; 2013 - $926 million; 2014 - $935 million; 2015 - $960 million; 2016 - $985 million; 2017 - $726 million; 2018 - $727 million); Box office – $19.7 million	Book	Wilbert Awdry and Christopher Awdry (The Railway Series); Britt Allcroft (Thomas & Friends)	Mattel
Fortnite	2017	$9 billion	Video games – $9 billion	Video game	Epic Games	Epic Games
Super Sentai / Power Rangers	1975 (Super Sentai); 1993 (Power Rangers)	$8.67 billion	Licensed merchandise – $8.47 billion (Note: Power Rangers licensed merchandise sales: Power Rangers licensed toy sales during 1993–1999 – $6 billion wholesale revenue; Power Rangers licensed merchandise sales during 2012–2018 – $2.479 billion; 2012 – $300 million; 2013 – $333 million; 2014 – $326 million; 2015 – $330 million; 2016–2017 – $909 million; 2018 – $281 million); DVD & Blu-ray – $18 million; Box office – $182 million	Television series	Shotaro Ishinomori; Haim Saban; Shuki Levy	Toei Company (Super Sentai; Power Rangers co-ownership, trademark in Asia); Bandai Namco Holdings (Super Sentai merchandise); Hasbro (Power Rangers co-ownership, international trademark; Super Sentai licensee outside Asia)
Middle-earth (The Lord of the Rings)	1937	$8.46 billion	Retail sales – $1.5 billion; Box office – $5.968 billion; Home media – $995 million	Novel	J. R. R. Tolkien	Tolkien Estate (books); Middle-earth Enterprises (Embracer Freemode) (ownership of IP outside of books); New Line Cinema (Skydance Corporation) (films, under sublicense of Middle-earth Enterprises)
X-Men	1963	$8.35 billion	Box office – $7.422 billion; DVD & Blu-ray sales – $823.6 million; Merchandise sales - $85 million (Note: 1994 – $85 million); Video games – $28 million (Note: X-Men video games: X-Men Legends – $28 million(United States))	Comic book	Stan Lee; Jack Kirby	Marvel Entertainment (The Walt Disney Company)
Superman	1938	$8.2 billion	Retail sales – $4.032 billion (Note: 2010 - $280 million; 2012 – $277 million; 2013 - $277 million; 2014 - $305 million; 2015 - $725 million; 2016 - $812 million; 2017 - $722 million; 2018 - $634 million); Box office – $3.833 billion; DVD & Blu-ray - $356 million	Comic book	Jerry Siegel; Joe Shuster	DC Entertainment (Skydance Corporation)
DC Extended Universe (DCEU)	2013	$8 billion	Box office – $7.191 billion; Home video sales – $709.4 million (Note: Main films - $693.2 million; Zack Snyder's Justice League (2021) – $16.2 million); Merchandise sales – $100 million	Film	DC Entertainment	DC Entertainment (Skydance Corporation)
Fast & Furious	2001	$7.98 billion	Box office – $7.333 billion; Home entertainment – $595 million	Film	Gary Scott Thompson	Universal Pictures (Comcast)
Lilo & Stitch (Stitch)	2002 (Note: Started as an unpublished children's book in 1985.)	$7.92 billion	Retail sales – $6.6 billion (Note: Lilo & Stitch / Stitch retail sales: Up to the 2024 fiscal year: over $2.6 billion.; 2025 fiscal year: over $4 billion.); Box office - $1.31 billion (Note: Lilo & Stitch theatrical films' box office: Lilo & Stitch (2002): $273.1 million; Lilo & Stitch (2025): $1.038 billion); Home media - $15.9 million	Animated film	Chris Sanders	The Walt Disney Company
Pirates of the Caribbean	2003 (Note: Pirates of the Caribbean became a media franchise with the debut of the film series in 2003.)	$7.9 billion	Box office – $4.522 billion; Home entertainment – $1.781 billion (Note: $1.75 billion up until May 2017. $31 million DVD and Blu-ray sales since September 2017.); Merchandise sales – $1.6 billion (Note: Merchandise retail sales up until 2011.)	Film	Walt Disney; Walt Disney Imagineering; Marc Davis; Gore Verbinski; Jerry Bruckheimer	The Walt Disney Company
Ben 10	2005	$7.85 billion	Retail sales – $7.853 billion (Note: Up until 2013 – $6 billion; 2014 – $681 million; 2015 – $569 million; 2016 – $603 million)	Animated series	Man of Action Studios Cartoon Network Studios	Cartoon Network (Skydance Corporation)
Sesame Street (The Muppets)	1955	$7.72 billion	Merchandise sales – $7.05 billion (Note: 2010 – $900 million; 2011 – $515 million; 2012 – $893 million; 2013 – $923 million; 2014 – $828 million; 2015 – $792 million; 2016 – $775 million; 2017 – $724 million; 2018 – $700 million); Box office – $481 million (Note: Muppets franchise box office: The Muppets film series – $456 million; Sesame Street Presents: Follow That Bird (1985) – $13.9 million; Being Elmo: A Puppeteer's Journey (2011) – $310,812; The Adventures of Elmo in Grouchland (1999) – $11.6 million); TV licensing – $96 million; DVD & Blu-ray sales – $98 million	Television series	Jim Henson; Joan Ganz Cooney; Lloyd Morrisett	The Muppets Studio (The Walt Disney Company); Sesame Workshop
Ultra Series (Ultraman)	1966	$7.4 billion	Merchandise sales – $7.4 billion (Note: Ultraman merchandise sales: Up until 1987 – $7.4 billion (Note: Sales in Japan only)); Box office – $1.1 million; Home media – $1.4 million	Television series	Eiji Tsuburaya	Tsuburaya Productions (Bandai Namco Holdings)
Sonic the Hedgehog	1991	$7.37 billion	Video games – $5 billion; Box office – $1.196 billion; Licensing – $1 billion; Home entertainment – $180 million	Video game	Sonic Team; Hirokazu Yasuhara; Yuji Naka; Naoto Ohshima	Sega (Sega Sammy Holdings)
Avatar	2009	$7.32 billion	Box office – $6.709 billion; DVD & Blu-ray sales – $459 million; Merchandise sales – $153 million	Film	James Cameron	20th Century Studios (The Walt Disney Company)
Puzzle & Dragons	2012	$7 billion	Video games – $7 billion	Video game	GungHo Online Entertainment	GungHo Online Entertainment
Madden NFL	1998	$7 billion	Video games – $7 billion	Video game	Electronic Arts	Electronic Arts; National Football League (NFL)
Fate	2004	$7 billion	Mobile game – $7 billion	Video game	Type-Moon	Type-Moon (video game); Aniplex (Sony Music Japan) (anime & mobile game)
Halo	2001	$6.8 billion	Games & consoles – $5 billion; Home video & merchandise – $1.8 billion	Video game	Bungie	Xbox Game Studios (Xbox)
Yu-Gi-Oh!	1996	$6.64 billion	Licensed merchandise – $5.595 billion (Note: Yu-Gi-Oh licensed merchandise sales: Up until January 2012 – $5 billion; April 2023 - March 2024 ($302,019,330) and April 2022 - March 2023 Japan (April 2023-March 2024 was 103% of last year for $293,222,650) $595.24 million); Video games – $1.013 billion (Note: Yu-Gi-Oh video games: Yu-Gi-Oh! The Eternal Duelist Soul (GBA) – $38 million (United States); Yu-Gi-Oh! The Sacred Cards (GBA) – $32 million (United States); Yu-Gi-Oh! The Duelists of the Roses (PS2) – $33 million (United States); Yu-Gi-Oh! Duel Links (mobile) – $284 million (Note: $284 million, collecting data from 2016, 2018, 2019, and the first half of 2021); Yu-Gi-Oh! Master Duel (Global) – $626 million (Note: $626 million, from the first Quarter of 2022, $132 million, from Mobile from the entire year of 2022.)); Anime box office – $39.3 million (Note: Yu-Gi-Oh Box Office: Yu-Gi-Oh! The Movie: Pyramid of Light (2004) – $29.2 million; Yu-Gi-Oh! Bonds Beyond Time (2010) – $2.6 million; Yu-Gi-Oh! The Dark Side of Dimensions (2016) – $7.5 million)	Manga	Kazuki Takahashi	Kazuki Takahashi; Shueisha (Hitotsubashi Group) (manga); Konami (games and cards)
Ice Age	2002	$6.42 billion (Note: Ice Age: As of April 2016 – $6 billion; Ice Age: Collision Course (June 2016) – $420 million)	Box office – $3.2 billion; Retail sales – $1.3 billion; Home entertainment – $347 million	Animated film	Michael J. Wilson; Blue Sky Studios	20th Century Studios (The Walt Disney Company)
Genshin Impact	2020	$6.3 billion	Video game – $6.3 billion	Video game	miHoYo; Cai Haoyu	miHoYo
Shrek	1990	$6.3 billion	Box office – $4.020 billion; Home entertainment – $1.922 billion (Note: First two films grossed $1.6 billion. Later films grossed $322 million.); Merchandise sales – $275 million; Broadway musical – $46.4 million; Video games – $38.9 million (Note: Shrek video games: Shrek 2 (2004) – $38.9 million)	Picture book	William Steig; DreamWorks Animation	Farrar, Straus and Giroux (book); Universal Pictures (Comcast) (films)
The Phantom of the Opera	1986	$6.15 billion	Musical theatre – $6 billion (Note: The Phantom of the Opera (1986) – $6 billion until 2017); Box office – $155 million	Gothic horror novel	Andrew Lloyd Webber; Gaston Leroux	Andrew Lloyd Webber; Gaston Leroux
My Little Pony	1984	$5.98 billion	Retail sales – $5.916 billion (Note: 1980s - $1 billion; 2012 - $260 million; 2013 - $650 million; 2014 - $1 billion; 2015 - $1.2 billion; 2016 - $456 million; 2017 - $660 million; 2018 - $690 million); Box office – $67.3 million (Note: My Little Pony box office gross: My Little Pony: The Movie (1986) – $6 million; My Little Pony: Equestria Girls (2013) – $483,752; My Little Pony: Equestria Girls – Rainbow Rocks (2014) – $347,511; My Little Pony: Equestria Girls – Friendship Games (2015) – $194,807; My Little Pony: The Movie (2017) – $60.3 million); DVD & Blu-ray sales – $4.3 million	Toy line	Lauren Faust; Bonnie Zacherle	Hasbro
Scooby-Doo	1969	$5.43 billion	Retail sales – $4.9 billion (Note: 1984 - $1 billion; 1999 – $800 million; 2002 – $750 million; 2004 – $1 billion; 2015 – $496 million; 2016 – $501 million; 2017 – $353 million); Box office – $483.4 million; DVD & Blu-ray sales – $54 million	Animated series	Joe Ruby; Ken Spears	Warner Bros. (Skydance Corporation)
Mamma Mia	1975	$5.16 billion	Musical theatre – $4 billion; Film box office – $988 million; DVD & Blu-ray sales – $180 million	Song	ABBA	Polar / Epic (Sony) (song); Universal Pictures (Comcast) (films)
Mortal Kombat	1992	$5.06 billion (Note: Mortal Kombat franchise: Up until 2000 – $5 billion; Mortal Kombat: Deadly Alliance (2002) video game – $54 million; Mortal Kombat Legends: Scorpion's Revenge (2020) DVD and Blu-ray sales – $2.9 million)	Video games – $4.054 billion (Note: Mortal Kombat video games: Up until 1995 – $4 billion; Mortal Kombat: Deadly Alliance (2002) – $54 million); Box office – $256 million; DVD & Blu-ray sales – $2.9 million	Video game	Midway Games Chicago; Ed Boon; John Tobias	Warner Bros. (Skydance Corporation)
Gundam	1979	$5 billion	Retail sales – $5 billion (Note: Gundam retail sales: Merchandise sales during 1979–1999 – $5 billion)	Anime series	Yoshiyuki Tomino	Bandai Namco Filmworks, directly and through Sotsu (Bandai Namco Holdings)
The Sims	2000	$5 billion	Video games – $5 billion	Video game	Will Wright	Electronic Arts
Bob the Builder	1998	$5 billion	Retail sales – $5 billion	Animated series	Keith Chapman	Mattel
MapleStory	2003	$5 billion	Video games – $5 billion	Video game	Nexon	Nexon
=== $2–4 billion ===
The Simpsons	1987	$4.9 billion	Merchandise sales – $4.223 billion (Note: 1990 – $750 million; 1993 – $250 million; 2008 – $750 million; During 2012–2013 – $725 million; 2014 – $390 million; 2015 – $396 million; During 2016–2017 – $707 million; 2018 – $255 million); Box office – $536 million; Video games – $141 million (Note: The Simpsons video games: The Simpsons: Road Rage (2001) – $41 million; The Simpsons: Tapped Out (2012) – $100 million)	Animated series	Matt Groening	20th Century Studios (The Walt Disney Company)
Assassin's Creed	2007	$4.7 Billion (Note: $4730800000(€4 billion) franchise revenue from 2014 to 2024)	Video games – $1 billion (Note: Assassin's Creed video games: Assassin's Creed Valhalla – $1 billion); Box office – $240 million; DVD & Blu-ray sales – $12 million	Video game	Patrice Désilets; Jade Raymond; Corey May	Ubisoft
Mission: Impossible	1966	$4.7 billion (Note: $4 billion franchise revenue up until 2011)	Box office – $4.392 billion; DVD & Blu-ray sales – $193 million; Video games – $24 million (Note: Mission: Impossible video games: Mission: Impossible 1998 – $24 million); TV revenue – $100 million (Note: Mission: Impossible television revenue: Mission: Impossible III – $100 million)	Television series	Bruce Geller	Paramount Pictures (Skydance Corporation)
Beyblade	1999	$4.6 billion	Merchandise sales – $4.6 billion (Note: Sales up until 2015); Box office – $9.7 million (Note: Beyblade: Fierce Battle (2002) – $3.5 million; Metal Fight Beyblade vs the Sun: Sol Blaze, the Scorching Hot Invader (2010) – $6.2 million.)	Manga	Takao Aoki	Takao Aoki; Shogakukan (Hitotsubashi Group)
The Big Bang Theory	2007	$4.57 billion	TV advertising – $3.57 billion (Note: $1.74 billion in 2015. $1.83 billion in 2016.); TV syndication – $1 billion	Television series	Chuck Lorre; Bill Prady	Warner Bros. (Skydance Corporation)
Seinfeld	1989	$4.56 billion	TV revenue – $4.06 billion; TV streaming – $500 million	Television series	Larry David; Jerry Seinfeld	Sony Pictures Television (Sony)
Minecraft	2009	$4.32 billion	Merchandise sales – $3.367 billion (Note: $1 million as of 2012.; 2013 – $300 million; 2014 – $407 million; 2015 – $549 million; 2016 – $700 million; 2017 – $679 million; 2018 – $731 million); Box office – $956 million	Video game	Markus Persson	Mojang Studios (Xbox)
Twilight	2005	$4.31 billion	Box office – $3.314 billion; DVD & Blu-ray sales – $1 billion	Novel	Stephenie Meyer	Little, Brown and Company; Summit Entertainment
Gran Turismo	1997	$4.1 billion	Video games – $4 billion; Box office - $117 million	Video game	Kazunori Yamauchi; Polyphony Digital	Sony Interactive Entertainment (Sony)
Strawberry Shortcake	1979	$4 billion	Retail sales – $4 billion; DVD sales – $2.6 million	Greeting card	American Greetings	WildBrain
The Smurfs	1958	$4 billion (Note: $4 billion franchise revenue up until 2008)	Box office - $1.109 billion; Home media - $98.4 million (Note: Films $98.1 million; The Smurfs: The Legend of Smurfy Hollow – $1.3 million)	Comic	Peyo	Studio Peyo
Cabbage Patch Kids	1982 (Note: as a media franchise)	$4 billion	Retail sales – $4 billion	television special	Coleco	Wicked Cool Toys (Berkshire Hathaway)
G.I. Joe	1967	$3.95 billion	Merchandise sales – $3.105 billion (Note: up until 1994 – $2.6 billion; 2001 – $80 million; 2009 – $125 million; 2010 – $300 million); Box office – $712 million; DVD & Blu-ray – $134 million	Comic	Stan Weston	Hasbro
The Hunger Games	2008	$3.83 billion	Box office – $3.317 billion; DVD & Blu-ray – $520 million	Novel	Suzanne Collins	Scholastic Corporation (books); Lionsgate (films)
Blue's Clues	1996	$3.6 billion	Retail sales – $3.6 billion	Television series	Traci Paige Johnson; Todd Kessler; Angela C. Santomero	Nickelodeon (Skydance Corporation)
Beauty and the Beast	1991	$3.52 billion	Box office – $1.689 billion (Note: Beauty and the Beast (1991) - $425 million; Beauty and the Beast (2017) - $1.264 billion); Musical - $1.4 billion (Note: up until 2015); DVD & Blu-ray sales – $432.6 million (Note: Beauty and the Beast DVD and Blu-ray sales: Animated films – $343.6 million; Beauty and the Beast (2017) – $89 million)	Animated film	Gary Trousdale Kirk Wise; Gabrielle-Suzanne de Villeneuve	The Walt Disney Company
Skylanders	2011	$3.5 billion	Licensed merchandise – $1.858 billion (Note: 2013 – $500 million; 2014 – $495 million; 2015 – $471 million; 2016 – $392 million)	Video game	Toys for Bob	Activision Blizzard (Xbox)
Titanic	1997	$3.45 billion	Box office – $2.257 billion; VHS & DVD sales – $1.2 billion	Film	James Cameron	Paramount Pictures (North America) (Skydance Corporation); 20th Century Studios (international) (The Walt Disney Company)
Titanfall	2014	$3.4 billion	Video games - $3.4 billion (Note: Apex Legends – $3.4 billion)	Video game	Respawn Entertainment	Electronic Arts
Bratz	2001	$3.23 billion	Retail sales – $3.15 billion (Note: 2002 – $650 million; 2004 – $2.5 billion); Box office – $26 million; Home entertainment – $56.7 million	Doll	Carter Bryant	MGA Entertainment
Fengshen Cinematic Universe	2019	$3.2 billion	Box office – $3.22 billion (Note: Main series – $2.981 billion; Other – $243 million); Home Media – $1.2 million	Film	Jiaozi	Beijing Enlight Pictures
Care Bears	1981	$3.05 billion	Retail sales – $3.02 billion (Note: Care Bears retail sales: 1980s – $2 billion; 2002 – $70 million; 2003 – $350 million; 2005 – $600 million); Box office – $34 million (Note: Care Bears films at box office: The Care Bears Movie – $34 million)	Greeting card	American Greetings	Cloudco Entertainment
Hamtaro	1997	$3.02 billion	Retail sales – $3 billion; Box office – $25 million (Note: Adventures in Ham-Ham Land (2001) – $25 million)	Manga	Ritsuko Kawai	Shogakukan (Hitotsubashi Group)
Terminator	1984	$3 billion (Note: $3 billion franchise revenue up until 2010.)	Box office – $2.074 billion; DVD & Blu-ray sales – $136 million	Film	James Cameron; Gale Anne Hurd	Skydance Media (Skydance Corporation)
Astro Boy	1952	$3 billion	Merchandise sales – $3 billion; Box office – $42 million; DVD & Blu-ray sales – $10.2 million	Manga	Osamu Tezuka	Tezuka Productions
Thor	1962	$2.98 billion	Box office – $2.710 billion; Home entertainment – $279 million	Comic book	Stan Lee; Larry Lieber; Jack Kirby	Marvel Entertainment (The Walt Disney Company)
Zootopia (Zootropolis)	2016	$2.9 billion	Box office – $2.796 billion; Home media – $111.962 million	Animated film	Byron Howard	The Walt Disney Company
Iron Man	1963	$2.89 billion	Box office – $2.425 billion; Home entertainment – $471 million	Comic book	Stan Lee; Jack Kirby; Larry Lieber; Don Heck	Marvel Entertainment (The Walt Disney Company)
Guardians of the Galaxy	1969	$2.71 billion	Box office – $2.485 billion; Home video – $232 million	Comic book	Roy Thomas; Arnold Drake; Gene Colan	Marvel Entertainment (The Walt Disney Company)
Inside Out	2015	$2.67 billion	Box office - $2.549 billion; Home media - $122.2 million	Animated film	Pete Docter	Pixar (The Walt Disney Company
The Elder Scrolls	1994	$2.65 billion	Video games – $2.65 billion (Note: The Elder Scrolls video game revenue: The Elder Scrolls: Arena (1994) – $6.16 million; 1994 – $4.6 million; 1995 – $1.23 million; 1996 – $330,000; The Elder Scrolls V: Skyrim (2011) – $650 million; The Elder Scrolls Online (2014) – $2 billion; The Elder Scrolls: Blades (2020) – $1.5 million)	Video game	Bethesda Softworks	ZeniMax Media (Xbox)
Godzilla (Gojira)	1954	$2.63 billion	Box office – $2.495 billion; DVD & Blu-ray sales – $136.4 million	Film	Ishirō Honda	Toho
Indiana Jones	1981	$2.6 billion	Box office – $2.210 billion; DVD & Blu-ray sales – $396 million	Film	George Lucas; Steven Spielberg	Lucasfilm (The Walt Disney Company)
Madagascar	2005	$2.59 billion	Box office – $2.270 billion; DVD & Blu-ray sales – $329 million	Animated film	Tom McGrath; Eric Darnell	DreamWorks Animation (Comcast)
Captain America	1941	$2.55 billion	Box office – $2.239 billion; DVD & Blu-ray sales – $317 million	Comic book	Joe Simon; Jack Kirby	Marvel Comics (The Walt Disney Company)
Kung Fu Panda	2008	$2.54 billion	Box office – $2.306 billion; DVD & Blu-ray sales – $234 million	Animated film	Ethan Reiff; Cyrus Voris	Universal Pictures (Comcast)
Winx Club	2004	$2.53 billion	Retail sales – $2.5 billion (Note: Retail sales up until 2010.); Box office – $34 million (Note: Winx Club franchise box office: Winx Club: The Secret of the Lost Kingdom (2007) – $18 million; Winx Club 3D: Magical Adventure (2010) – $11 million; Winx Club: The Mystery of the Abyss (2014) – $5 million)	Animated series	Iginio Straffi	Rainbow S.p.A. (Skydance Corporation) (copyright for seasons 5–7)
The Powerpuff Girls	1998	$2.52 billion	Retail sales – $2.5 billion (Note: Retail sales up until 2014.); Box office – $16.4 million	Animated series	Craig McCracken	Cartoon Network (Skydance Corporation)
Friends	1994	$2.5 billion	TV syndication – $1.5 billion; TV advertising – $1 billion (Note: More than $1 billion in the 1990s.); Box office – $89,007	Television series	David Crane; Marta Kauffman	Bright/Kauffman/Crane Productions; Warner Bros. (Skydance Corporation)
Sailor Moon	1991	$2.5 billion	Merchandise sales – $2.5 billion	Manga	Naoko Takeuchi	Naoko Takeuchi; Kodansha (manga); Toei Animation (anime)
The Incredibles	2004	$2.37 billion	Box office – $1.875 billion; Merchandise sales – $370 million (Note: 2017 - $185 million; 2018 - $185 million); DVD & Blu-ray sales – $127 million	Animated film	Brad Bird	The Walt Disney Company
Kumamon	2010	$2.36 billion	Retail sales – $2.36 billion (Note: Kumamon retail sales: 2011–2012 – $1.2 billion; 2016 – $1.16 billion)	Cartoon	Kumamoto Prefecture	Kumamoto Prefecture
Aladdin	1992	$2.33 billion	Box office – $1.554 billion (Note: Aladdin Franchise Box Office: Aladdin (1992) – $504 million; Aladdin (2019) – $1.050 billion); Broadway musical – $571.8 million; Video games – $200 million	Animated film	Hanna Diyab; Walt Disney Animation	The Walt Disney Company
Black Panther	1966	$2.31 billion	Box office – $2.209 billion; Home video – $104 million	Comic book	Stan Lee; Jack Kirby	Marvel Entertainment (The Walt Disney Company)
Planet of the Apes	1963	$2.27 billion	Box office – $2.115 billion; DVD & Blu-ray sales – $157 million	Novel	Pierre Boulle	Éditions Julliard (book); 20th Century Studios (Disney) (films)
Jumanji	1981	$2.24 billion	Box office – $2.089 billion; DVD & Blu-ray sales – $155 million	Picture book	Chris Van Allsburg	Sony
The Little Mermaid	1989	$2.21 billion (Note: $2 billion franchise revenue up until 1992)	Box office – $782 million; Merchandise sales – $1 billion; DVD & Blu-ray sales – $349 million; Musical - $83 million	Animated film	Hans Christian Andersen; Ron Clements; John Musker	The Walt Disney Company
The Conjuring Universe	2013	$2.18 billion	Box office – $2.107 billion; Home media – $79 million	Film	James Wan	Warner Bros. (Skydance Corporation)
Ghostbusters	1984	$2.18 billion	Merchandise sales – $1 billion; Box office – $1.1 billion; Home media – $85 million	Film	Dan Aykroyd; Harold Ramis	Sony
Finding Nemo	2003	$2.15 billion	Box office – $1.961 billion; DVD & Blu-ray sales – $196 million	Animated film	Andrew Stanton	The Walt Disney Company
The Matrix	1999	$2.11 billion	Video games – $300 million (Note: The Matrix video games: Enter the Matrix– (2003) $300 million); Box office – $1.791 billion; Home media – $26 million	Film	The Wachowskis	Warner Bros. (Skydance Corporation)
Rocky	1976	$2.11 billion	Box office - $1.993 billion; Home media - $119.5 million	Film	Sylvester Stallone	Metro-Goldwyn-Mayer (Amazon)
MonsterVerse	2014	$2.09 billion	Box office – $1.94 billion; Home media – $159 million	Film	Thomas Tull; Ishirō Honda (Godzilla); Edgar Wallace (King Kong); Merian C. Cooper (King Kong)	Warner Bros. (Skydance Corporation); Legendary Entertainment; Toho (Godzilla)
Yo-kai Watch	2013	$2.09 billion	Merchandise sales – $2 billion; Box office – $99.4 million	Video game	Level-5	Level-5
The Chronicles of Narnia	2005	$2.06 billion	Box office - $1.556 billion; Home media - $506 million	Film	C. S. Lewis; Andrew Adamson	Netflix
E.T. the Extra-Terrestrial	1982	$2.04 billion	Merchandise sales – $1 billion; Box office – $797 million; VHS sales – $250 million	Film	Steven Spielberg	Universal Pictures (Comcast)
Robert Langdon The Da Vinci Code	2000	$2.04 billion	Book sales – $400 million; Box office - $1.478 billion; Home media - $164.1 million	Book	Dan Brown	Doubleday; Sony (film series)
Bourne	1980	$2.03 billion	Box office – $1.665 billion; DVD & Blu-ray sales – $374 million	Novel	Robert Ludlum	Eric Van Lustbader (books); Universal Pictures (Comcast) (films)
Men in Black	1990	$2.02 billion	Box office – $1.940 billion; DVD & Blu-ray sales – $83 million	Comic book	Lowell Cunningham	Marvel Comics (Disney) (comics); Sony (films)
Resident Evil (Biohazard)	1996	$2 billion	Video games – $600 million; Box office – $1.271 billion; Home video – $132 million	Video game	Shinji Mikami; Tokuro Fujiwara	Capcom
Guitar Hero	2005	$2 billion	Video games – $2 billion	Video game	Harmonix	Activision Blizzard (Xbox)
Lego	1995	$2 billion	Video games – $2 billion (Note: as of 2019)	Video game	Lego Interactive (The Lego Group)	TT Games (Skydance Corporation)
NBA Jam	1993	$2 billion	Video games – $2 billion	Video game	Midway Games	Electronic Arts; National Basketball Association (NBA)
Neon Genesis Evangelion	1994	$2 billion (Note: Franchise revenue up until 2006)	TV revenue - $1.4 billion; Retail sales - $255 million; Box office - $254 million (Note: Neon Genesis Evangelion: Death & Rebirth (1997) – $15 million (¥1.87 billion); End of Evangelion (1997) – $21 million (¥2.47 billion); Rebuild of Evangelion: Evangelion 1.0 (2007) – $17 million (¥2.0 billion); Evangelion 2.0 (2009) – $42 million (¥4.0 billion); Evangelion 3.0 (2012) – $65 million (¥5.3 billion); Evangelion 3.0+1.0 (2021) – $94 million (¥10.28 billion))	Anime	Hideaki Anno	Khara
Farm Heroes Saga	2014	$2 billion	Video games – $2 billion	Video game	King	King (Xbox)

== See also ==
- List of best-selling comic series
  - List of best-selling manga
  - List of best-selling light novels
- List of best-selling video game franchises
- Lists of multimedia franchises
- Lists of highest-grossing films
  - List of best-selling films in the United States
  - List of films by box office admissions
  - List of highest-grossing films
  - List of highest-grossing animated films
  - List of highest-grossing Japanese films
  - List of highest-grossing non-English films
