= Yūki Masuda =

Japanese actor

- 増田 裕生
- Born: September 12, 1979 (age 47); Tokyo, Japan
- Occupations: Actor; voice actor
- Years active: 1990–present
- Height: 171 cm (5 ft 7 in)

Yūki Masuda (増田 裕生, Masuda Yūki; born September 12, 1979) is a Japanese actor and voice artist from the Tokyo Metropolitan area.

== Career ==
=== Voice acting ===
Masuda's breakthrough came with voice director Takayuki Hamana's 2004 television adaptation of The Prince of Tennis. Cast as Masaharu Niō, a doubles specialist who "reads ten moves ahead", he quickly became a fan favourite and has reprised the character in original-video animations, feature films and stage recordings.

Parallel to his anime work he joined the Sonic games, debuting in Sonic Heroes (2003). A 2024 casting survey by specialist outlet Siliconera lists Masuda among the returning Japanese leads for Sonic x Shadow Generations, underscoring Espio's importance to the current franchise canon.

Other notable roles covered in the trade press include Ferb Fletcher in the Japanese dub of Phineas and Ferb, for which he supplied promotional comments during the Disney/Marvel crossover campaign.

=== Live-action and stage ===
Masuda's highest-profile screen role remains Hiroshi Kuronaga, "Boy 9" of Class 3-B, in Kinji Fukasaku's dystopian thriller Battle Royale (2000). The Arrow Video archival booklet names him in the principal cast list for both the original theatrical cut and the director's edition.

On stage he has featured in several 2.5-dimensional musicals, among them the second Prince of Tennis live series, where reviewers singled out his chemistry with co-star Eiyū Tsuda for sustaining the franchise's comedic "trick play" routines.

== Filmography ==
=== Anime ===
1992

- The Little Twins (Tafuru)

2003

- Sonic X (Espio)

2004

- The Prince of Tennis (Masaharu Niou)
- Yu-Gi-Oh! GX (Daichi Misawa)

2005

- Idaten Jump (Masa)
- Ginga Legend Weed (Kyōshirō)

2006

- Eyeshield 21 (Riku Kaitani)
- Kekkaishi (Yoshiro Takemitsu)
- Strain: Strategic Armored Infantry (Colin)
- Tokko (Ajiro)
- Musashi Gundoh (Kirigakure Saizō)
- Red Garden (Luke)

2007

- Moribito: Guardian of the Spirit (Sune)

2008

- Kure-nai (Tadashi Kunō)
- True Tears (Jun Isurugi)
- Persona: Trinity Soul (Watanabe)

2010

- Angel Beats! (Fujimaki)
- Katekyo Hitman Reborn (G)
- Night Raid 1931 (Kiyoshi Mitani)
- Yu-Gi-Oh! 5D's (Breo)

2011

- Kamisama Dolls (Fujima, Torimasa)

2012

- The New Prince of Tennis (Masaharu Niou)

=== Original video animation ===
- The Prince of Tennis series (Masaharu Niō)
- Red Garden: Dead Girls (Luke)

=== Film animation ===
- Only Yesterday (Shuji Hirota)

=== Video games ===
- Angel Beats! 1st Beat (Fujimaki)
- Bladestorm: The Hundred Years' War (Charles VII of France)
- Sonic the Hedgehog series
  - Sonic Heroes (Espio the Chameleon)
  - Shadow the Hedgehog (Espio the Chameleon)
  - Sonic Heroes (Espio the Chameleon)
  - Mario & Sonic at the Olympic Games (Espio the Chameleon)
  - Sonic Colors (Espio the Chameleon)
  - Sonic Generations (Espio the Chameleon)
  - Mario & Sonic at the Rio 2016 Olympic Games (Espio the Chameleon)
  - Sonic Forces (Espio the Chameleon)
  - Mario & Sonic at the Olympic Games Tokyo 2020 (Espio the Chameleon)
  - Sonic at the Olympic Games (Espio the Chameleon)
- The Prince of Tennis series (Masaharu Niou)
- Yu-Gi-Oh!
  - Yu-Gi-Oh! GX Tag Force 2 (Daichi Misawa)
  - Yu-Gi-Oh! GX Tag Force 3 (Daichi Misawa)
  - Yu-Gi-Oh! 5D's Tag Force 6 (Breo)
  - Yu-Gi-Oh! Arc-V Tag Force Special (Daichi Misawa)
  - Yu-Gi-Oh! Duel Links (Daichi Misawa)

=== Dubbing ===
- City of God (Bené (Phellipe Haagensen))
- One Tree Hill (Lucas Scott (Chad Michael Murray))
- Shameless (Lip Gallagher (Jeremy Allen White))
- Untraceable (Owen Reilly (Joseph Cross))

=== Live-action ===
- Battle Royale (Hiroshi Kuronaga)
