= Eileen Stevens =

American actress

- Born: Eileen Stevens
- Occupation: Actress
- Years active: 2002–present

Eileen Stevens is an American actress based in New York City, having done voice work for DuArt Film and Video and NYAV Post. Stevens' first major role in an anime series was Belldandy in Ah! My Goddess. In 2011, she was cast as the lead role of Iris in Pokémon Black & White. Stevens has also voiced several Yu-Gi-Oh! anime characters, including Leo, Luna and Sherry LeBlanc (5D's; third season onwards), Tori Meadows (Zexal) and Sora Perse (Arc-V). Other than anime dubbing and theatre, Eileen has also done audiobooks and commercials.

She has a MS from Hunter College.

== Filmography ==
=== Animation ===
- Ah! My Goddess – Belldandy, Hijiri
- Astonishing X-Men Motion Comics – Kitty Pryde
- Gall Force: New Era – Pearl
- Ikki Tousen: Dragon Destiny – Bashoku, Koshaji, Shibai (credited as Julie Francis)
- King of Braves – GaoGaiGar – Ai Amami, Hana Hatsuno
- Mobile Suit Gundam Unicorn – Beltorchika Irma (Ep. 5)
- Let's Go! Tamagotchi – Ringotchi
- Pokémon – Iris and other voices (left the series in 2018 but returned in Journeys in 2021 to reprise her role as Iris and left again in season 25).
- Robin Hood: Mischief in Sherwood – Scarlett
- The Colors Within – Sister Hiyoko (Movie; English Dub)
- The Snow Queen 3: Fire and Ice – as Snow Queen
- Yoko – Oto, Ranger
- Winx Club (Nickelodeon, season 7) – Flora, Kalshara, Lockette, Little girl with headband (7x20), Francine (7x25), Girl with purple hair and Narrator
- World of Winx (English dub) – Flora, Sophie's Teacher (ep. 05), Mermaid #1 (2x13)
- Yu-Gi-Oh! (series)
  - 5D's – Leo, Luna (Season 3 onwards), Sherry LeBlanc
  - Bonds Beyond Time – Leo, Luna, Yubel
  - ZEXAL I & II – Tori Meadows, Mrs. Meadows, Lillybot
  - ARC-V – Sora Perse, Olga

=== Stage/Theater ===
- The Tragic and Horrible Life of the Singing Nun

=== Audiobooks ===
- Dark Divine
- Ferdinand Madellan
- Girl Vs. Superstar
- Primary Source of The: Colonel History of Virginia
- Sealed with a Kiss
- Dumplin' (2015)
- It Doesn't Have to Be Crazy at Work (2018)
- Blood of The City
