= Yu-Gi-Oh! The Dawn of Destiny =

2004 video game

- North American box art
- Developer: Konami Computer Entertainment Japan
- Publisher: Konami
- Series: Yu-Gi-Oh!
- Platform: Xbox
- Release: NA: March 23, 2004; EU: November 19, 2004; AU: December 3, 2004
- Genre: Digital collectible card game
- Modes: Single player Multiplayer

Yu-Gi-Oh! The Dawn of Destiny is a strategy video game developed by Konami Computer Entertainment Japan and published by Konami. It was released exclusively for Xbox on March 23, 2004, in North America, November 19, 2004, in Europe, and December 3, 2004, in Australia. It was the first of the Yu-Gi-Oh! franchise on the Xbox. The game has over 1,000 Yu-Gi-Oh! cards and integrates the Yu-Gi-Oh! trading card gameplay and rules with 3D monster battles. The Dawn of Destiny also includes new duel modes such as Link Duel mode and Triple Duel mode, where players can test their skills against three duelists.

== Gameplay ==
The game follows the official card battling rules while bringing the Yu-Gi-Oh! bestiary to life in 3D. Duelists can watch the results of the cards they play in real-time 3D battles, or use the game's Library feature to browse the hundreds of monsters featured in the game. The number of cards available in Dawn Of Destiny is well over 1,000.

The player can build up to three decks, which can be stored. The game's deck-building interface is designed to be easy to use. The single-player mode allows fans to duel against favorite characters from the animated series, while the game's "Link Duel Mode" lets two human opponents go head-to-head. As with many earlier Yu-Gi-Oh! releases from Konami, Dawn Of Destiny comes packaged with three (actual) game cards, including the Egyptian God Monster card "Winged Dragon of Ra" (a collector's item which may not be used in official rules duels).

== Development ==
On January 9, 2004, Konami Digital Entertainment announced three games to be released in the Yu-Gi-Oh! series: Yu-Gi-Oh! World Championship Tournament 2004 for the Game Boy Advance, Yu-Gi-Oh! Xbox (working title) for the Xbox, and Yu-Gi-Oh! Power of Chaos: Kaiba the Revenge for PC, all to be released in spring 2004. Each game starred Yugi Mutou and his friends and shipped with three exclusive limited edition game cards. The game marked the debut of the franchise on the Xbox. 1,000 Yu-Gi-Oh! cards were to be available, including exclusive cards that had never appeared in any other Yu-Gi-Oh! video game.

== Reception ==
Reception

Aggregate scores
Aggregator	Score
GameRankings	53%
Metacritic	53 out of 100

Review scores
Publication	Score
Game Informer	6 out of 10
GamePro	2.5 out of 5
GameRevolution	D+
GameSpot	5.2 out of 10
GameSpy	2 out of 5
GameZone	6 out of 10
IGN	5 out of 10
Official Xbox Magazine (US)	5.8 out of 10
TeamXbox	5.9 out of 10
X-Play	2 out of 5

The game received "mixed" reviews according to the video game review aggregator website Metacritic.
