= Yu-Gi-Oh! Nightmare Troubadour =

2005 video game

- Developer: Konami Computer Entertainment Japan
- Publisher: Konami
- Director: Masakuni Nakazawa
- Producers: Motoyuki Yoshioka (executive); Atsushi Horigami; Hirotaka Reizei; Takeshi Kameta
- Designers: Kazuki Takahashi; Masakuni Nakazawa
- Programmers: Yukihiro Hojo; Hidehito Uchida; Tsuyoshi Shimizu; Hideyuki Takahashi
- Writer: Arthur Murakami (translation)
- Composers: Tsutomu Watanabe; Maki Kirioka; Toshihisa Furusawa; Naomitsu Ariyama (ARY)
- Series: Yu-Gi-Oh!
- Platform: Nintendo DS
- Release: JP: July 21, 2005; NA: August 30, 2005; EU: November 17, 2005
- Genre: Digital collectible card game
- Modes: Single-player, Multiplayer

Yu-Gi-Oh! Nightmare Troubadour (Note: Japanese: 遊☆戯☆王デュエルモンスターズ NIGHTMARE TROUBADOUR 同梱カード, Hepburn: Yūgiō Dyueru Monsutāzu Naitomea Torabadōru) (also Yu-Gi-Oh! Duel Monsters Nightmare Troubadour) is a 2005 video game developed and published by Konami for the Nintendo DS. It is the first game based on the Yu-Gi-Oh! trading card game and franchise released on the system.

== Gameplay ==
=== Duels ===
The bottom screen of the DS features a top-down view of the game board. Players can use the system's buttons or touchscreen to select and play cards, view card details, activate card effects, and change the phase of their turn. The top screen features a 3D "arena", where monsters are displayed as pre-rendered sprites on top of the game board, similar to the holographic projections in the anime and manga. Certain monsters feature 3D animations when summoned.

=== Story mode ===
The main plot borrows elements from the first three seasons of the anime and manga, with the player dueling various characters from the series as they progress through a tournament.

=== Multiplayer ===
The game allows up to two players to duel and trade cards with one another using the system's wireless LAN capabilities.

== Reception ==
Yu-Gi-Oh! Nightmare Troubadour

Aggregate score
Aggregator	Score
Metacritic	73%

Review scores
Publication	Score
1Up.com	B+
G4	3/5
GameSpot	6.8/10
GameSpy	3.5/5
IGN	7/10
Nintendo Power	8.0/10
PALGN	7.5/10

Nightmare Troubadour received "mixed or average reviews" according to review aggregator site Metacritic.

It was generally praised as an improvement over past releases in the series for its presentation and interface, noted for making use of the system's unique hardware. It was also lauded for introducing newcomers to the card game's rules through in-game tutorials. However, critics felt that the detail of the sprite and 3D animations did not push what the new system was capable of.

The game was re-released in Japan on June 29, 2006, under Konami's "Konami The Best Edition" branding but without the promotion cards.
