= Yu-Gi-Oh! GX Tag Force 2 =

2007 video game

- North American box art
- Developer: Konami Computer Entertainment Japan
- Publisher: Konami
- Platform: PlayStation Portable
- Release: NA: September 18, 2007; JP: September 27, 2007; EU: December 7, 2007
- Genre: Digital collectible card game
- Modes: Single-player, multiplayer

Yu-Gi-Oh! GX Tag Force 2 (Note: Japanese: 遊☆戯☆王デュエルモンスターズGX タッグフォース2, Hepburn: 'Yu-Gi-Oh! Duel Monsters GX Tag Force 2) is a 2007 digital collectible card game based on the Yu-Gi-Oh! series, developed by Konami and released on PlayStation Portable format in September 2007. This is the second work in the Yu-Gi-Oh Tag Force series.

== Gameplay ==
Early in the game, after create a profile, the player chooses a duelist (main characters of the Yu-Gi-Oh! GX animation) as a partner. The player must build a deck between 40 and 60 cards in order to duel. The game includes over 2800 cards.

The player has the option of dueling solo, tag or just watching the partner play. As the player wins duels, the partner's heart level increases.

=== Mini games ===
A mini game that can increase the partner's heart. Appears during the class and in some places on the map in story mode. If the score is high, the heart will increase, but if it fails, it will decrease.

=== UMD recognition ===
It is a system used to unlock rare cards through other games in the Tag Force series. New cards can be obtained depending on the game title used in UMD recognition. In addition, at recognizing the previous Tag Force games, will be unlock three special cards called "Slifer the Sky Dragon", "Obelisk the Tormentor", and "The Winged Dragon of Ra". Also will be available hidden packs for purchase.

== Reception ==
Overall, the game received mixed reviews. In Metacritic, reached an average score of 60, based on seven reviews. Sam Bishop, from IGN, criticizes the lack of online multiplayer support and also the complexity of the game for beginners. The difficulty of the game for beginners is also cited by Jeff Gedgaud, from Game Chronicles when writing: "Yu-Gi-Oh! GX Tag Force 2 is a game for the seasoned Yu-Gi-Oh! player and not for the faint of heart."

In a positive analysis, Salehuddin Husin, from GameAxis, praises the inclusion some improvements, compared to the first game in the series, more animations and flashier graphics, rated 7.5.
