= Yu-Gi-Oh! The Sacred Cards =

2002 video game

- European box art
- Developer: Konami
- Publisher: Konami
- Composers: Norihiko Hibino; Kazuki Muraoka; Sotaro Tojima; Masashi Watanabe
- Series: Yu-Gi-Oh!
- Platform: Game Boy Advance
- Release: JP: July 4, 2002; NA: November 4, 2003; EU: February 6, 2004
- Genre: Digital collectible card game
- Mode: Single-player

Yu-Gi-Oh! The Sacred Cards (Note: Yu-Gi-Oh! Duel Monsters 7: The Duelcity Legend (Japanese: 遊☆戯☆王デュエルモンスターズ7 決闘都市伝説, Hepburn: Yugiō duerumonsutāzu nana kettō toshi densetsu) in Japan) is a Game Boy Advance game based on the Yu-Gi-Oh! anime, developed and published by Konami. It was first released in Japan on July 4, 2002. It was released in North America the following year and in Europe the year after that.

Unlike most of the previous Yu-Gi-Oh! video games, this game has a story. It is based on the Battle City arc of the anime. The player assumes the role as a friend of Yugi Muto as they compete in the Battle City tournament.

The game was re-released in 2025 as part of the Yu-Gi-Oh! Early Days Collection game compilation.

== Gameplay ==
The rules of the game are slightly different from the real card game. They resemble the rules of Yu-Gi-Oh! Dark Duel Stories, themselves based on the prototype rules that were being considered when the card game was first being transferred over from the manga. Unlike the real game, there is an elemental ruling. For example, water beats fire, electricity beats water. Also, there is a notable absence of game phases and numerous card effects have been removed or changed.

== Storyline ==
The game starts when the player and his two friends, Yugi Moto and Joey Wheeler are preparing for the Battle City tournament of the card game known as Duel Monsters. In order to win the tournament, the player must obtain six Locator Cards which are received after beating certain characters in Duel Monsters. After all of the locators are obtained, the player is entered into the finals.

However, a mysterious person named Marik has a gang of card thieves known as Ghouls which he is using to disrupt Battle City and obtain the three Egyptian God cards to bring the world to darkness. The Ghouls eventually take over the whole city. Even the owner of the card shop works for Marik and tries to kill the player. Then, the player meets up with a character named Ishizu Ishtar. She challenges the player to a duel to see if he is strong enough to wield an Egyptian God Card. After she is beaten, the player must beat Seto Kaiba, the person that organized the tournament, in order to obtain the first God card.

After the player gets into the finals which take place on a blimp, he duels Marik. After Marik is beaten, it is found out that it was not really Marik. It was actually one of Marik's servants. The real Marik was the person the player met earlier in the game that became one of Yugi's friends: Namu. Then, Marik starts stealing the souls of those he beats. After Marik defeats Kaiba, the player must challenge Yugi. After Yugi is beaten, the player must face Marik. The game cannot be saved after beaten so once the game is beaten, the player will restart at the last save point.

== Reception ==
Reception

Aggregate scores
Aggregator	Score
GameRankings	59%
Metacritic	60/100

Review scores
Publication	Score
Game Informer	7.5/10
GameSpy	3/5
GameZone	7.8/10
IGN	5/10
Nintendo Power	2.5/5

Yu-Gi-Oh! The Sacred Cards received "mixed" reviews according to video game review aggregator Metacritic.

However, the game sold nearly 1 million units, with 750,000 copies in the United States and over 238,000 in Japan, and received a sequel known as Yu-Gi-Oh! Reshef of Destruction. Its sequel greatly increased the game's difficulty and length by raising the card restrictions.

In the United States, it sold 750,000 copies and earned $22 million by August 2006. During the period between January 2000 and August 2006, it was the 27th highest-selling game launched for the Game Boy Advance, Nintendo DS or PlayStation Portable in that country.
