= Yu-Gi-Oh! The Falsebound Kingdom =

2002 video game

- North American cover art
- Developer: Konami Computer Entertainment Japan
- Publisher: Konami
- Series: Yu-Gi-Oh!
- Platform: GameCube
- Release: JP: December 5, 2002; NA: November 4, 2003; EU: November 19, 2004; AU: December 2, 2004
- Genres: Real-time strategy, role playing

Yu-Gi-Oh! The Falsebound Kingdom (遊☆戯☆王 フォルスバウンドキングダム ～虚構に閉ざされた王国, Yugiō forusubaundo kingudamu ~ kyokō ni tozasa reta ōkoku) is a 2002 role-playing video game developed and published by Konami for the GameCube. It was released in Japan in December 2002, North America in November 2003 and PAL regions in late 2004. It is the only game in the Yu-Gi-Oh! series to be released for the GameCube.

Yu-Gi-Oh! The Falsebound Kingdom takes a different direction from the rest of the series, being more of a mix of real-time strategy and role-playing video game elements than the typical card battling games seen on other systems. The gameplay features a 3D battle stage including bonuses and improvements (such as fortresses, weapons, etc.) It features most of the major characters from the anime and manga series as well as 177 monsters.

== Plot ==
At first the player can choose between two storylines. Seto Kaiba and Yugi Muto, but later the player can get one for Joey Wheeler as well. The Yugi storyline involves Yugi, Joey, Tristan, Téa and Bakura being invited to the testing of the virtual reality game "Kingdom," created by the company SIC. When they enter the game they soon find themselves trapped within it, and they must summon the help of the game's characters and monsters in order to defeat the game's villain, Emperor Haysheen and ultimately stop the plans of the game's designer, Scott Irvine, to control the three Egyptian God cards. Along the way, the players faces Joey Wheeler, Téa Gardner, and Yami Bakura.

Kaiba's storyline features Seto Kaiba and his brother Mokuba Kaiba, who are also trapped in the game. Initially they work for Emperor Haysheen, but Marthis, Kaiba's 'helper', hears Kaiba talking to Maximillion Pegasus and suspects that Kaiba is a spy for the resistance. Marthis turns Kaiba in to the Emperor, who sentences him to a public execution. However, Kaiba escapes with Mokuba and Bonz. Marthis is waiting for him with a unit, and promises the man who brings Kaiba to him anything he wants. After defeating all enemies on the level, Pegasus arrives and asks Kaiba to lead the resistance, as he 'cannot return to the Empire' with a price on his head. Kaiba recruits further members for his resistance, including Weevil Underwood and Rex Raptor.

A climactic plot event in both stories occurs when Mokuba is kidnapped, and Scott forces Kaiba to battle against Yugi. At the end of both storylines is a segment taking place within a secret room leading from the game's fantasy environment to the inner workings of the computer that is running the game itself. Either team must defeat Scott Irvine as well as the enemy DarkNite, wielder of one of the God Cards, Obelisk the Tormentor in Yugi's story and Slifer the Sky Dragon in Kaiba's. After beating one story, the other storyline becomes harder, with higher level monsters. In this harder mode, there is an additional villain, Nitemare, who has the God Card at level 99.

Joey's storyline is a prequel to Yugi's and features some minor characters from the other storylines. Its main villain is Marik Ishtar who uses The Winged Dragon of Ra under Scott's manipulation. This storyline finishes with the character facing Kaiba, Mokuba, Marthis and 4 Marshals.

== Gameplay ==
In the Falsebound Kingdom, the player controls an army of Marshals opposed to an army of enemy Marshals. Each warrior commands up to three Duel Monsters. Duel Monsters individually have Attack power and Defense power, and also have HP and AP, the latter representing how many turns they are able to take in battle. Monsters can take items into battle with them with various effects such as increasing their stats or recovery their health. Marshals have an affinity towards certain types of monsters, represented by a colored orb; the closer a monster's orb color is to a Marshal's, the higher that monsters stats will be. Continued service under a Marshal will gradually change a monster's affinity. Monsters can also have unique abilities or attacks with special mechanics, such as hitting multiple targets or doing extra damage to certain enemy types.

Players command their army of Marshals on a field against the enemy Marshals and advance them towards bases held by the other team. When two Marshals come in range of each other, their team of Duel Monsters fights. Whichever Marshal is victorious, they remain in their position on the map while the defeated Marshal is sent to the nearest allied base to slowly recover their strength. At allied bases the player can spend money to upgrade the base with facilities, including speeding up the healing rate of Marshals there or shops to purchase items. The objective is usually to push the player's allied forces to the enemy's central base and capture it.

=== Challenge Mode ===
The game also includes a Challenge Mode consisting entirely of battles, where the player has to fight various characters from the campaign, such as Joey, Kaiba, and Yugi.

== Reception ==
Reception

Aggregate score
Aggregator	Score
Metacritic	44/100

Review scores
Publication	Score
Game Informer	6.5/10
GamePro	2.5/5
GameSpot	3.1/10
GameSpy	2/5
GameZone	5.9/10
IGN	3.5/10
Nintendo Power	2.4/5

The game received "generally unfavorable reviews" according to video game review aggregator Metacritic.

- GameRankings rated the game 48%.
