= Yu-Gi-Oh! Early Days Collection =

2025 video game compilation

- Developer: Digital Eclipse
- Publisher: Konami
- Producer: Dant Rambo
- Programmers: Michaēl LaRouche; Ian Sherman
- Artists: Norm Badillo; Cameron Badillo; Oscar Charla
- Composer: Bob Baffy
- Platforms: Nintendo Switch, Windows
- Release: WW: February 27, 2025
- Genre: Digital collectible card game
- Modes: Single-player, multiplayer

Yu-Gi-Oh! Early Days Collection (Note: Japanese: 遊☆戯☆王 アーリーデイズコレクション, Hepburn: Yū Gi Ō Ārī Deizu Korekushon) is a video game compilation developed by Digital Eclipse and published by Konami, released in commemoration of the Yu-Gi-Oh! Trading Card Game's 25th anniversary. It contains emulated versions of the first 14 handheld games based on the Yu-Gi-Oh franchise, originally released between 1998 and 2004. Several of the included games were localized and released outside of Japan for the first time as part of the collection.

Early Days Collection was released worldwide on February 27, 2025 for Nintendo Switch and Windows. It received mixed reviews from critics, who praised the collection's preservational aspects and amount of content, but criticized the games themselves for their slow gameplay and lack of tutorials.

== Features ==
All games in the compilation are playable in Japanese, English, French, German, Italian, and Spanish, including those which had not previously been localized, with the exception of Duel Monsters 6: Expert 2, which is only available in Japanese. (Note: Duel Monsters 6: Expert 2 was later modified and released internationally as Worldwide Edition: Stairway to the Destined Duel, which is also included in Early Days Collection.) In each game, players can remap the button layout, create save states, and fast forward or rewind gameplay. Online multiplayer support has been added to select games via post-launch updates. An "enhancements" menu allows the player to apply special modifiers to each game; examples include unlocking all cards, removing deck point limits for player decks, enabling cards normally banned from play, or activating hidden characters and cards that could originally only be accessed through special means. An in-game gallery includes digital scans of the games' original box art and instruction manuals.

=== Games ===
Yu-Gi-Oh! Early Days Collection includes 14 games originally released for the Game Boy, Game Boy Color, and Game Boy Advance handheld systems, all featuring characters and cards from the original Yu-Gi-Oh! Duel Monsters series. While the included games are primarily digital collectible card games, Monster Capsule is instead a real-time strategy game, while Dungeon Dice Monsters and Destiny Board Traveler are based around board game mechanics.

Titles included in Yu-Gi-Oh! Early Days Collection
Title	Original system	Released (JP)	Online multiplayer
Yu-Gi-Oh! Duel Monsters	Game Boy	1998	No
Yu-Gi-Oh! Duel Monsters II: Dark Duel Stories	Game Boy Color	1999	No
Yu-Gi-Oh! Monster Capsule	Game Boy Color	2000	No
Yu-Gi-Oh! Dark Duel Stories (Note: Originally released in Japan as Yu-Gi-Oh! Duel Monsters III: Tri-Holy God Advent; not to be confused with Duel Monsters II: Dark Duel Stories)	Game Boy Color	2000	No
Yu-Gi-Oh! Duel Monsters 4: Battle of Great Duelists (Note: Includes all three versions of Duel Monsters 4: Battle of Great Duelists—Yugi Deck, Kaiba Deck, and Joey Deck)	Game Boy Color	2000	Yes
Yu-Gi-Oh! Dungeon Dice Monsters	Game Boy Advance	2001	Yes
Yu-Gi-Oh! The Eternal Duelist Soul	Game Boy Advance	2001	No
Yu-Gi-Oh! Duel Monsters 6: Expert 2	Game Boy Advance	2001	No
Yu-Gi-Oh! The Sacred Cards	Game Boy Advance	2002	No
Yu-Gi-Oh! Reshef of Destruction	Game Boy Advance	2003	No
Yu-Gi-Oh! Worldwide Edition: Stairway to the Destined Duel	Game Boy Advance	2003	No
Yu-Gi-Oh! World Championship Tournament 2004	Game Boy Advance	2004	Yes
Yu-Gi-Oh! Destiny Board Traveler	Game Boy Advance	2004	No
Yu-Gi-Oh! 7 Trials to Glory: World Championship Tournament 2005	Game Boy Advance	2004	No

== Development and release ==
Yu-Gi-Oh! Early Days Collection was announced on February 5, 2024, at a Konami event celebrating the 25th anniversary of the Yu-Gi-Oh! Trading Card Game. The announcement revealed two of the included games, with the remaining entries confirmed gradually over the course of the year; the final list of included games was published in December 2024. The compilation marks the first international release of Yu-Gi-Oh! Duel Monsters, Duel Monsters II: Dark Duel Stories, Monster Capsule, Duel Monsters 4: Battle of Great Duelists, and Duel Monsters 6: Expert 2. The game was released on February 27, 2025, for Nintendo Switch and Windows via Steam; physical copies of the Nintendo Switch version included one of two limited edition Yu-Gi-Oh! trading cards.

== Reception ==
Reception

Aggregate scores
Aggregator	Score
Metacritic	68/100 (NS) (Note: Based on 23 reviews); 65/100 (PC) (Note: Based on 11 reviews)
OpenCritic	39% recommended (Note: Based on 36 reviews)

Review scores
Publication	Score
Hardcore Gamer	2.5/5
MeriStation	7/10
Nintendo Life	7/10
Nintendo World Report	6.5/10
Retro Gamer	72%
The Games Machine (Italy)	6.5/10

Yu-Gi-Oh! Early Days Collection received "mixed or average" reception according to the review aggregation website Metacritic. Fellow review aggregator OpenCritic assessed that the game received fair approval, being recommended by 39% of critics.

Jordan Biordi of CG Magazine praised the comprehensive nature of the collection, but believed the games might feel too archaic for newcomers to enjoy. Cody Perez of Siliconera felt a select few of the included games, particularly those that diverged from the traditional Yu-Gi-Oh! formula, made the collection a worthwhile purchase. Chris Penwell of Hardcore Gamer believed more could have been done to modernize the older games' mechanics through improved UI and tutorials. Jess Elizabeth Reed of Nintendo Life noted that while the collection's quality-of-life improvements did make the games more manageable to play, they did not eliminate frustrations with the older games. Willem Hilhorst of Nintendo World Report felt the collection would only appeal to existing Yu-Gi-Oh! fans, with particular criticism towards the lack of online multiplayer support for most of the games. Nick Thorpe of Retro Gamer echoed this, finding it difficult to recommend it to anyone but the most committed fans of the franchise. He added that the price was too high for players' first encounter with the series, as so many of the games were so similar to one another which made him question the long-term appeal of the collection.
