= Yu-Gi-Oh! Dungeon Dice Monsters =

2001 video game

- North American box art
- Developer: Konami
- Publisher: Konami
- Series: Yu-Gi-Oh!
- Platform: Game Boy Advance
- Release: JP: March 21, 2001; NA: February 11, 2003; PAL: July 11, 2003
- Genre: Turn-based strategy
- Modes: Single-player, multiplayer

Yu-Gi-Oh! Dungeon Dice Monsters (Note: Known in Japan as Yu-Gi-Oh! Dungeon Dice Monsters (Japanese: 遊☆戯☆王ダンジョンダイスモンスターズ, Hepburn: Yū-Gi-Ō! Danjon Daisu Monsutāzu)) is a dice-based tactics video game based on an original board game featured in the Yu-Gi-Oh! storyline. It was developed and published by Konami, and released on March 21, 2001, in Japan, February 11, 2003, in North America and July 11, 2003, in Europe for the Game Boy Advance. The gameplay revolves around battling opponents using magical dice placed on a board to create dungeons. It contains both a single-player campaign mode in which the player battles the AI, as well as a head-to-head multiplayer mode.

Critics gave the game mixed reviews, praising the game's strategy elements, while criticizing its lack of a story mode and difficult learning curve, made harder by the lack of a tutorial.

Dungeon Dice Monsters was adapted into a real world tabletop game in 2002. The video game was re-released in 2025 as part of the Yu-Gi-Oh! Early Days Collection game compilation.

== Reception ==
Reception

Aggregate score
Aggregator	Score
Metacritic	67/100

Review scores
Publication	Score
GamePro	3/5
GameSpy	90/100
IGN	8/10

The game received an aggregate score of 67/100 on Metacritic, indicating "mixed or average reviews".

Craig Harris of IGN wrote that the gameplay was "extremely enjoyable" and not formulaic. He praised the interface but criticized the lack of story or exploration, as well as the absence of a tutorial. Stating the game is "extremely confusing", he said that the player would need a couple of hours to learn the rules.

"Evil Star Dingo" of GamePro said the game was "kind of brilliant" as a board game, but criticizing the lack of story mode and the fact that the game lacks a quicksave function, forcing you to lose if your battery runs out or you have to stop playing in the middle of a long match. They also called the graphics "very utilitarian" and the sound "8-bit NES quality", commenting that "the music needs to die".

Steve Steinberg of GameSpy described the gameplay as "astoundingly complex", but criticizing the steep learning curve and lack of any storyline.
