= Yu-Gi-Oh! World Championship Tournament 2004 =

2004 video game

- Developer: Konami
- Publisher: Konami
- Series: Yu-Gi-Oh!
- Platform: Game Boy Advance
- Release: JP: February 5, 2004; NA: February 10, 2004; EU: March 26, 2004
- Genre: Digital collectible card game
- Modes: Single-player, multiplayer

Yu-Gi-Oh! World Championship Tournament 2004, known in Japan as Yu-Gi-Oh! Duel Monsters Expert 3 (遊☆戯☆王デュエルモンスターズ エキスパート3), is a card battle video game based on the Yu-Gi-Oh! franchise. This game was released for the Game Boy Advance system in 2004, and was re-released in 2025 as part of the Yu-Gi-Oh! Early Days Collection game compilation.

== Gameplay ==
This game has many obvious similarities to The Eternal Duelist Soul. The duel system is almost exactly the same, but there are a few differences.

The player can assemble a deck and can duel against a variety of computer opponents. The game features the first 1,138 cards released in Japan. There are 29 opponents in the game, however duelist 29 can't be played and is locked when Marik is at least once defeated. Each opponent has different skills and decks revolve around a certain theme (Yugi=Basic, Exodia Rare Hunter=Exodia, Yami Yugi (Dark Yugi)=Ultimate, etc.).

=== Game mechanics ===
When a duelist has at least one copy of all 1,138 cards, they can choose to ignore the Limited List. However, the stronger duelists don't follow the Limited list either. For example, Simon the Exodia duelist has three of each of the Exodia parts in his deck, where normally a player may only have one. The AI is rather poor: if a player has a face-down monster with 2000 defense points, and the AI opponent has a monster with 1900 attack points, they will not attack as they "know" they cannot defeat the face-down monster. As well, an AI opponent will Tribute Summon as soon as possible, even tributing 1 monster to summon exactly the same monster, or even a weaker monster than the original. Stronger duelists often have high requirements to be "unlocked" (available to duel): the final duelists in the game require the player have at least fifteen more wins than losses against every other duelist in the game.

== Reception ==
Reception

Aggregate scores
Aggregator	Score
GameRankings	70%
Metacritic	68/100

Review scores
Publication	Score
Game Informer	6.5/10
GamePro	3.5/5
GameSpot	6.1/10
GameSpy	4/5
GamesTM	70%
GameZone	8.5/10
IGN	7.5/10
Nintendo Power	2.9/5
X-Play	2/5

The game received "average" reviews according to video game review aggregator Metacritic.

== Sequel ==
Yu-Gi-Oh! 7 Trials to Glory: World Championship Tournament 2005, also known as Yu-Gi-Oh Duel Monsters International 2 in Japan and Yu-Gi-Oh! Day of the Duelist: World Championship Tournament 2005 in Australia and Europe, was released for the Game Boy Advance. The game is initially a role-playing video game with strategy elements, in the form of the in-game dueling that plays the main role in this game. The player assumes the role of a beginner duelist who must enter card battle tournaments. The game also comes with three free Yu-Gi-Oh! game cards: Mind Control, Kaibaman, and Silent Swordsman LV7.
