= Yu-Gi-Oh! Worldwide Edition: Stairway to the Destined Duel =

2003 video game

- North American box art
- Developer: Konami
- Publisher: Konami
- Series: Yu-Gi-Oh!
- Platform: Game Boy Advance
- Release: NA: April 15, 2003; JP/EU: April 17, 2003
- Genre: Digital collectible card game
- Modes: Single player, Multiplayer

Yu-Gi-Oh! Worldwide Edition: Stairway to the Destined Duel, later released in Japan as Yu-Gi-Oh! Duel Monsters International (遊☆戯☆王デュエルモンスターズ インターナショナル, Yu-Gi-Ō! Dyueru Monsutāzu Intānashonaru), is a Game Boy Advance game developed and published by Konami in 2003. It is a modified version of Yu-Gi-Oh! Duel Monsters 6: Expert 2, previously released for the Game Boy Advance in 2001, and adapts the "Battle City" story arc of the original Yu-Gi-Oh! series. The game was re-released in 2025 as part of the Yu-Gi-Oh! Early Days Collection game compilation.

== Gameplay ==
The game starts out after the title screen, with one of the officials in the Battle City region, giving the player an option of 1 of 3 decks of 40 or more cards. Once a deck is selected, there is a Battle City map of characters that can be played, and can select an area of Battle City that holds up to three duelers per area. However, the opponents are random, not showing a name or picture to identify their character.

The player must win, lose or tie to show all the characters at the beginning. From there, players go around Battle City to duel opponents. However, there are many events during the game to accomplish.

== Plot ==
With a vague plot many different challenges are available, but the significant part of the game is "The Pyramid". Once the five Ghouls are defeated, Téa, controlled by Marik Ishtar, will lead you to the Pyramid. The Pyramid is a five-game gauntlet challenge in which a player who loses must restart from the beginning. The Pyramid is organized into chambers. The first duel is against Téa controlled by Marik; the second and third duels are against 2 of the 5 ghouls at random. The fourth duel is against Joey Wheeler controlled by Marik; in the 5th and final chamber, the opponent is Marik himself. Upon Marik's defeat, the Pyramid is cleared.

Once the Pyramid is beaten, the Ghouls will appear as regular opponents, and ten Card Limitation Duel events will be available. Upon completion, the player will unlock 'Free Mode', receiving the ability to toggle on or off the deck count limit of individual cards (e.g. the trap card Mirror Force normally is limited to one copy per deck; in Free Mode, up to three copies can be used in a deck, as is the case with most other cards). Side challenges, including "Target Week" and weekend championship tournaments, provide various incentives for players to seek out specific opponents throughout the game.

== Events/challenges ==
- Challenge Cup and Kaiba Corp Cup - This event usually comes every month. This challenge is a three-game tournament in which all players face each other to make their way to the finals, however the players only participates in three duels. The finalist, almost always a strong opponent will challenge you for the Cup. However, in the KC Cup Kaiba will always be played.
- Weekend Tournaments - Held usually on Saturdays, there will be a random opponent to duel in a best out of 3 match.
- Limitation Tournaments - Only accessed by finishing everything else in the game, there are 10 rounds, and these are duels where depending on which duel, certain types of cards are not permitted to use including Magic and Trap cards, level 5 and up monsters, and many more. These are permanent up to no avail.
- Target Week - Held every week, by one of the Battle City officials, will tell you two random duelists you must defeat to get a bonus of 200 points. However, sometimes the duelists you are looking for are not on the map so the player has to go from area to area until the next week.

=== Point systems ===
Points are important to the game, as they can unlock gradually more powerful booster packs, won by defeating an opponent in a duel. There are 3 at the start, but once certain requirements are met, more booster packs can be unlocked, thus adding more powerful cards to a deck editing screen.

A total of 27 packs are included; some unchoosable ones, usually rare cards are not included in all the packs; only by beating a rare hunter in which a pack of 5 random powerful cards are included. One that has a Millennium Puzzle on it and a pink background only is available on the fourth Sunday of the month when you battle, though no calendar is shown.

The highest number of points that have to be met is 50,000 points, meaning 1,000 wins. However, tournaments hand out more points, and also finishing important parts of the game are also rewarded by points. The two Cups will be awarded by 300 points.

==== Points ====
- Win: +50 points
- Loss: -30 points
- Draw: +20 points
- Win match: +150 points
- Lose match: -50 points
- Draw match: -30 points
- Win 2 matches in a row: +300 points
- Win Target Week: +200 points

== Sub-menu ==
- Password - A useful way to obtain cards, eight digits are needed for a password on a screen from buttons 0 to 9. Once typed in, the card shown is that card's password. Only one copy of each card can be accessed using the password. On each real Yu-Gi-Oh! trading card there is a code on the bottom (however some cards, such as Black Luster Soldier, which is a ritual monster, Blue-Eyes Ultimate Dragon, which is a fusion monster, aren't available; including the Egyptian God Cards).
- Trading - This enables you, with a link cable, to trade cards with another player on a different Game Boy system and game cartridge. It could be used for only one player to get a card or a fair trade to both strengthen their deck.
- Link Duel - With a link cable, two players can play each other, rather than one player dueling a CPU opponent.
- Card Limitation - An option to turn card limits on or off. If this option is off, three copies of any card can be included in the deck.
- Deck and Trunk - This portion is the deck editing screen. On one section there are all the cards collected from booster packs and defeating rare hunters. The second category is the main deck. The last one is the side deck used to switch cards in tournament matches.

=== Deck editing ===
Editing a deck is quite simple; from all the cards in the trunk, when a card is highlighted by scrolling up and down, there is an option if it wants to go to the main or side deck. To make the task easier, there is a card filtering icon which lets the player choose what type of cards they are looking for.

If the player chooses a monster card, they would select either Name, Attack, Defense, Type, Attribute, and Level to categorize which monster they would like to add. For a main and side deck, there is an option for a selected card to go to the trunk, main and side deck. Just like the official Yu-Gi-Oh! rules, a minimum of 40 cards and maximum of 60 cards are permitted. Up to 15 cards are to be used in the side deck; and 20 in the Fusion deck.

== Miscellaneous ==
The game comes with three free cards: Sinister Serpent, Harpie's Feather Duster, and Valkyrion the Magna Warrior. Valkyrion is a supplemental card to the 3 from the Yu-Gi-Oh: The Duelists of the Roses PlayStation 2 game.

== Reception ==
Reception

Aggregate scores
Aggregator	Score
GameRankings	73%
Metacritic	72/100

Review scores
Publication	Score
Game Informer	7.5/10
GamesMaster	71%
GameSpot	6.1/10
GameSpy	3/5
GameZone	6.8/10
IGN	8/10
Nintendo Power	3.3/5
Nintendo World Report	5/10
X-Play	4/5

The game received "average" reviews according to video game review aggregator website Metacritic.

1.46 million units were sold worldwide.
