= Yu-Gi-Oh! The Eternal Duelist Soul =

2001 video game

- North American box art
- Developer: Konami
- Publisher: Konami
- Series: Yu-Gi-Oh!
- Platform: Game Boy Advance
- Release: JP: July 5, 2001; NA: October 15, 2002; EU: April 17, 2003
- Genre: Digital collectible card game
- Modes: Single-player, multiplayer

Yu-Gi-Oh! The Eternal Duelist Soul (Note: Known in Japan as Yu-Gi-Oh! Duel Monsters 5: Expert 1. (Japanese: 遊☆戯☆王デュエルモンスターズ５ エキスパート１, Hepburn: Yū-Gi-Ō! Dyueru Monsutāzu Faibu: Ekisupāto Wan)) is a card battle video game based on the Yu-Gi-Oh! franchise. It was developed and published by Konami and released on July 5, 2001 in Japan, October 16, 2002 in the United States for Game Boy Advance. It features a single-player campaign against opponents from the Yu-Gi-Oh! anime as well as a multiplayer head-to-head mode.

It was positively received by critics for its gameplay, although the game's campaign was criticized for its lack of a true story, and the absence of a tutorial mode was noted as an issue for inexperienced players. The game was re-released in 2025 as part of the Yu-Gi-Oh! Early Days Collection game compilation.

== Gameplay ==
The game structure and progression carries over most aspects from the previous Duel Monsters series games on Game Boy. Players challenge a set of computer opponents modelled after characters to card game duels, and after a certain number of wins against the opponents in a set, the next set of opponents is unlocked. A new calendar system has been added, facilitating scheduled and random events to happen as the days advance.

The most notable change is in the rule-set of the actual duels, which aims to adapt the “Expert rules” of the physical card game, as opposed to the previous titles which loosely based themselves on the older and depreciated “Official rules”. The game features over 800 cards (900 in the Japanese version) for the player to collect and duel with. Cards can be acquired from in-game card packs won after winning duels or received as a weekly in-game magazine freebie. Alternatively, one can also enter an eight-digit password found on the physical cards themselves to add a copy of that card to their digital collection.

== Release and reception ==
Reception

Aggregate score
Aggregator	Score
Metacritic	81/100

Review score
Publication	Score
IGN	8/10

Yu-Gi-Oh! The Eternal Duelist Soul was released in Japan for the Game Boy Advance on July 5, 2001.

The game received an aggregate score of 81/100 on Metacritic, indicating "generally favorable reviews".

Craig Harris of IGN rated the game 8/10 points, praising the gameplay as "a lot of fun", calling it "so simple to understand that it almost doesn't need [a tutorial]". However, he criticized the dearth of story in the campaign mode, saying that he wished the characters had more exposition, and noting that the game was "obviously made for already-familiar fans". He also called the game's interface "a little wonky".

Matt Keil of TechTV rated the game 4/5 stars, calling it "by far the best of the Yu-Gi-Oh! games to make it to American shores" at the time of its release, and noting that it was a more faithful adaptation of the card game than previous entries. He also called it much more enjoyable than its predecessors due to the elimination of the star chip system, as well as other limitations on card use and opponent level.

Pocket Games magazine rated the game 8/10, calling it "one for the hardcore Yu-Gi-Oh! players". Marc Saltzman of The Cincinnati Enquirer rated the game 4/5 stars, calling it a "solid pick".
