= 2003 in video games =

2003 saw many sequels and prequels in video games, such as Tony Hawk's Underground, Madden NFL 2004, NBA Live 2004, ESPN NBA Basketball, Saya no Uta: The Song of Saya, Final Fantasy X-2, Mario Kart: Double Dash, Mario & Luigi: Superstar Saga, Prince of Persia: The Sands of Time, Sonic Heroes, Postal 2, Star Wars: Knights of the Old Republic, Uru: Ages Beyond Myst, and WWE SmackDown! Here Comes the Pain.

New intellectual properties included Beyond Good & Evil, Boktai: The Sun is in Your Hand, Call of Duty, Disgaea, Drakengard, Manhunt, PlanetSide, TrackMania, True Crime: Streets of LA, and Viewtiful Joe. The year's best-selling video game worldwide was Pokémon Ruby/Sapphire, the fifth time a Pokémon games was the annual worldwide top-seller (since 1998).

== Legend ==
Video game platforms
GBA	Game Boy Advance, iQue GBA	GCN	GameCube	PS1	PlayStation 1
PS2	PlayStation 2	WIN	Windows, all versions Windows 95 and up	XB	Xbox, Xbox Live Arcade

== Financial performance ==
Computer games continue to lose ground to console video games with a US sales drop of 14% in 2003. Total 2003 entertainment software sales in the United States grew slightly to US$7 billion; console sales increased to $5.8 billion and computer games accounted for the remaining $1.2 billion.

=== Best-selling games by region ===
Worldwide

Best-selling video games worldwide in 2003
Game	Platform	Publisher	Sales			
Game	Platform	Publisher	Japan	USA	Europe	Worldwide
Pokémon Ruby / Sapphire	GBA	Nintendo	1,704,458	2,200,000+	1,500,000+	6,120,000
Mario Kart: Double Dash	GCN	Nintendo	567,849	1,000,000+	Unknown	3,580,000
Final Fantasy X-2	PS2	Square Enix	2,000,000+	1,000,000	Unknown	3,400,000
Pro Evolution Soccer 3	PS2	Konami	1,160,000	—N/a	1,550,000	2,710,000
Super Mario Advance 4: Super Mario Bros 3	GBA	Nintendo	457,095	1,100,000+	Unknown	2,590,000
Madden NFL 2004	PS2	EA Sports	—N/a	2,300,000+	Unknown	2,300,000+
Mario Party 5	GCN	Nintendo	481,053	Unknown	Unknown	1,640,000
Enter the Matrix	PS2	Infogrames	92,459	1,000,000+	300,000+	1,392,459+
The Legend of Zelda: The Wind Waker	GCN	Nintendo	252,064	1,100,000+	Unknown	1,352,064+
Grand Theft Auto: Vice City	PS2	Rockstar	—N/a	1,000,000+	300,000+	1,300,000+

Japan

Best-selling video games in Japan in 2003
Rank	Game	Platform	Publisher	Genre	Sales	Ref
1	Final Fantasy X-2	PS2	Square Enix	Role-playing	2,000,000+	
2	Pokémon Ruby / Sapphire	GBA	The Pokémon Company	Role-playing	1,704,458	
3	Dynasty Warriors 4	PS2	Koei	Hack and slash	1,178,455	
4	Pro Evolution Soccer 3	PS2	Konami	Sports	1,160,000	
5	Everybody's Golf 4	PS2	Sony	Sports	875,252	
6	Dragon Quest Monsters: Caravan Heart	GBA	Square Enix	Role-playing	593,458	
7	Mobile Suit Gundam: Encounters in Space	PS2	Bandai	Third-person shooter	577,972	
8	Mario Kart: Double Dash	GCN	Nintendo	Kart racing	567,849	
9	Made in Wario	GBA	Nintendo	Party	556,806	
10	Dragon Ball Z: Budokai	PS2	Bandai	Fighting	543,312	

United States

Best-selling video games in the United States
Rank	Game	Platform	Publisher	Genre	Sales	Ref
1	Madden NFL 2004	PS2	EA Sports	Sports	2,300,000+	
2	Pokémon Ruby / Sapphire	GBA	Nintendo	Role-playing	2,200,000+	
3	Super Mario Advance 4: Super Mario Bros 3	GBA	Nintendo	Platformer	1,100,000+	
4	The Legend of Zelda: The Wind Waker	GCN	Nintendo	Action-adventure	1,100,000+	
5	Grand Theft Auto: Vice City	PS2	Rockstar Games	Action-adventure	1,000,000+	
6	Mario Kart: Double Dash	GCN	Nintendo	Kart racing	1,000,000+	
7	Mario & Luigi Superstar Saga	GBA	Nintendo	Role-playing	1,000,000+	
8	Enter the Matrix	PS2	Infogrames	Action-adventure	1,000,000+	
9	Medal of Honor: Rising Sun	PS2	Electronic Arts	First-person shooter	1,000,000+	
10	NCAA Football 2004	PS2	EA Sports	Sports	1,000,000+	

PAL regions

Best-selling video games in PAL regions
Rank	Australia		United Kingdom		
Rank	Game	Platform	Game	Platform(s)	Sales
1	EyeToy: Play	PS2	FIFA Football 2004		700,000+
2	Grand Theft Auto: Vice City	PS2	Need for Speed: Underground		700,000
3	Gran Turismo 3: A-Spec	PS2	Medal of Honor: Rising Sun		300,000+
4	V8 Supercars	PS2	The Sims		300,000+
5	Pokémon Ruby	GBA	Grand Theft Auto: Vice City		300,000+
6	Pokémon Sapphire	GBA	Enter the Matrix		300,000+
7	Crash Bandicoot: The Wrath of Cortex	PS2	Tom Clancy's Splinter Cell		300,000+
8	Need for Speed: Underground	PS2	EyeToy: Play	PS2	300,000+
9	Rugby League	PS2	The Simpsons: Hit & Run		300,000+
10	Enter the Matrix	PS2	FIFA Football 2003		300,000+

== Game ratings ==
=== Critically acclaimed games ===
Metacritic and GameRankings

Metacritic (MC) and GameRankings (GR) are aggregators of video game journalism reviews.

2003 games and expansions scoring at least 88/100 (MC) or 87.5% (GR)
Game	Publisher	Release date	Platform(s)	MC score	GR score
Grand Theft Auto Double Pack	Rockstar Games	November 4, 2003	XB	96/100	94.6%
The Legend of Zelda Collector's Edition	Nintendo	November 17, 2003	GCN	95/100	92.17%
Championship Manager 4	Eidos Interactive	March 28, 2003	WIN	N/A	95%
Grand Theft Auto: Vice City	Rockstar Games	May 12, 2003	WIN	94/100	94.39%
Star Wars: Knights of the Old Republic	LucasArts	July 15, 2003	XB	94/100	94.21%
NCAA Football 2004	EA Sports	July 16, 2003	PS2	94/100	93.27%
Super Mario Advance 4: Super Mario Bros. 3	Nintendo	October 21, 2003	GBA	94/100	92.25%
Madden NFL 2004	EA Sports	August 12, 2003	PS2	94/100	91.77%
Madden NFL 2004	EA Sports	August 12, 2003	GCN	94/100	91.54%
Pro Evolution Soccer 3	Konami	October 17, 2003	WIN	92/100	93.33%
Star Wars: Knights of the Old Republic	LucasArts	November 19, 2003	WIN	93/100	93.19%
Project Gotham Racing 2	Microsoft Game Studios	November 18, 2003	XB	90/100	93.16%
Pro Evolution Soccer 3	Konami	August 7, 2003	PS2	93/100	92.97%
SSX 3	EA Sports	October 20, 2003	PS2	93/100	92.28%
Soulcalibur II	Namco	March 27, 2003	GCN	93/100	92.23%
Virtua Fighter 4: Evolution	Sega	March 13, 2003	PS2	93/100	91.59%
Viewtiful Joe	Capcom	June 26, 2003	GCN	93/100	91.19%
Prince of Persia: The Sands of Time	Ubisoft	November 18, 2003	XB	92/100	92.67%
Prince of Persia: The Sands of Time	Ubisoft	November 18, 2003	GCN	92/100	92.12%
SSX 3	EA Sports	October 20, 2003	GCN	92/100	92%
Prince of Persia: The Sands of Time	Ubisoft	November 10, 2003	PS2	92/100	91.94%
Soulcalibur II	Namco	March 27, 2003	XB	92/100	91.62%
Soulcalibur II	Namco	March 27, 2003	PS2	92/100	91.47%
SSX 3	EA Sports	October 20, 2003	XB	92/100	89.93%
Madden NFL 2004	EA Sports	August 12, 2003	XB	92/100	89.24%
Call of Duty	Activision	October 29, 2003	WIN	91/100	91.52%
NCAA Football 2004	EA Sports	July 16, 2003	XB	88/100	91.33%
Tom Clancy's Splinter Cell	Ubisoft	February 19, 2003	WIN	91/100	90.16%
ESPN NFL Football	Sega	September 3, 2003	XB	91/100	89.27%
Madden NFL 2004	EA Sports	August 12, 2003	WIN	91/100	88.4%
ESPN NFL Football	Sega	September 3, 2003	PS2	91/100	88.12%
Castlevania: Aria of Sorrow	Konami	May 6, 2003	GBA	91/100	87.9%
F1 Challenge '99–'02	EA Sports	June 24, 2003	WIN	91/100	85.29%
Warcraft III: The Frozen Throne	Blizzard Entertainment	July 1, 2003	WIN	88/100	90.98%
Ratchet & Clank: Going Commando	Sony Computer Entertainment	November 11, 2003	PS2	90/100	90.64%
Tony Hawk's Underground	Activision	October 27, 2003	PS2	90/100	90.58%
NCAA Football 2004	EA Sports	July 16, 2003	GCN	89/100	90.42%
Mario & Luigi: Superstar Saga	Nintendo	November 17, 2003	GBA	90/100	90.41%
NBA Street Vol. 2	EA Sports	April 29, 2003	PS2	90/100	90.16%
Advance Wars 2: Black Hole Rising	Nintendo	June 24, 2003	GBA	89/100	90.16%
ESPN NHL Hockey	Sega	September 9, 2003	PS2	90/100	86.42%
The Elder Scrolls III: Morrowind – Game of the Year Edition	Bethesda Softworks	October 31, 2003	XB	88/100	89.9%
Tiger Woods PGA Tour 2004	EA Sports	September 22, 2003	PS2	89/100	89.78%
Tiger Woods PGA Tour 2004	EA Sports	September 22, 2003	GCN	89/100	89.54%
Burnout 2: Point of Impact	Acclaim Entertainment	April 9, 2003	GCN	89/100	89.43%
NBA Street Vol. 2	EA Sports	April 29, 2003	GCN	88/100	89.36%
Crimson Skies: High Road to Revenge	Microsoft Game Studios	October 21, 2003	XB	88/100	89.26%
NASCAR Racing 2003 Season	Sierra Entertainment	February 13, 2003	WIN	89/100	89.25%
Rise of Nations	Microsoft Game Studios	May 20, 2003	WIN	89/100	89.17%
World Series Baseball 2K3	Sega	March 10, 2003	XB	89/100	89.12%
F-Zero GX	Nintendo	July 25, 2003	GCN	89/100	89.03%
NBA Street Vol. 2	EA Sports	April 29, 2003	XB	89/100	88.91%
WarioWare, Inc.: Mega Microgames!	Nintendo	March 21, 2003	GBA	89/100	88.83%
Prince of Persia: The Sands of Time	Ubisoft	November 10, 2003	WIN	89/100	88.59%
Tom Clancy's Splinter Cell	Ubisoft	March 28, 2003	PS2	89/100	88.07%
Top Spin	Microsoft Game Studios	October 28, 2003	XB	89/100	88.05%
Tiger Woods PGA Tour 2004	EA Sports	September 22, 2003	XB	89/100	87.23%
Tom Clancy's Splinter Cell	Ubisoft	April 10, 2003	GCN	89/100	86.82%
Tony Hawk's Underground	Activision	October 27, 2003	GCN	89/100	86.18%
ESPN NBA Basketball	Sega	October 21, 2003	PS2	89/100	86.13%
Fire Emblem: The Blazing Blade	Nintendo	April 25, 2003	GBA	88/100	88.83%
Beyond Good & Evil	Ubisoft	December 2, 2003	XB	87/100	88.61%
Burnout 2: Point of Impact	Acclaim Entertainment	May 1, 2003	XB	88/100	88.55%
Max Payne 2: The Fall of Max Payne	Rockstar Games	October 14, 2003	WIN	86/100	88.52%
Beyond Good & Evil	Ubisoft	December 11, 2003	GCN	87/100	88.14%
Tom Clancy's Rainbow Six 3	Ubisoft	October 28, 2003	XB	86/100	88.06%
Tony Hawk's Pro Skater 4	Activision	August 27, 2003	WIN	88/100	87.64%
ESPN NHL Hockey	Sega	September 9, 2003	XB	88/100	87.27%
Microsoft Flight Simulator 2004: A Century of Flight	Microsoft	July 29, 2003	WIN	88/100	87.07%
Tiger Woods PGA Tour 2004	EA Sports	September 22, 2003	WIN	88/100	86.77%
NASCAR Thunder 2004	EA Sports	September 16, 2003	PS2	88/100	86.72%
Jak II	Sony Computer Entertainment	October 14, 2003	PS2	87/100	87.93%
Final Fantasy Tactics Advance	Square	February 14, 2003	GBA	87/100	87.64%

Famitsu

The following video game releases in 2002 entered Famitsu magazine's "Platinum Hall of Fame" and received Famitsu scores of at least 36 out of 40.

Title	Platform	Developer	Publisher	Genre	Score (out of 40)
Lifeline	PS2	Sony Computer Entertainment	Sony Computer Entertainment	Survival horror	37
Virtua Fighter 4: Evolution	PS2	Sega AM2	Sega	Fighting	37
Mario & Luigi: Superstar Saga	GBA	AlphaDream	Nintendo	RPG	37
Ikaruga	GCN	Treasure	Atari	Shoot 'em up	36
Dynasty Warriors 3	PS2	Omega Force	Koei	Hack and slash	36
Castlevania: Aria of Sorrow	GBA	Konami Tokyo	Konami	Action RPG	36
Minna no GOLF Online	PS2	Clap Hanz	Sony Computer Entertainment	Sports	36
Jikkyou Powerful Pro Yakyuu 10 (Power Pros 10)	GCN	Pawapuro Production	Konami	Sports	36
Jikkyou Powerful Pro Yakyuu 10 (Power Pros 10)	PS2	Pawapuro Production	Konami	Sports	36
Boktai: The Sun Is in Your Hand	GBA	Konami Tokyo	Konami	Action RPG	36
Pro Evolution Soccer 3	PS2	Konami Computer Entertainment Japan	Konami	Sports	36
Mario Kart: Double Dash!!	GCN	Nintendo EAD	Nintendo	Racing	36
Everybody's Golf 4 (Hot Shots Golf Fore!)	PS2	Clap Hanz	Sony Computer Entertainment	Sports	36
Resident Evil Outbreak	PS2	Capcom Production Studio 1	Capcom	Survival horror	36

=== Critically panned games ===
2003 games and expansions scoring lower than 37/100 (MC) or 37.5% (GR)
Game	Publisher	Release date	Platform(s)	MC score	GR score
Big Rigs: Over the Road Racing	GameMill Publishing	November 20, 2003	WIN	8/100	3.83%
Navy SEALs: Weapons of Mass Destruction	ValuSoft	July 18, 2003	WIN	18/100	18.83%
Gods and Generals	Activision	March 1, 2003	WIN	19/100	25.5%
Drake of the 99 Dragons	Majesco	November 3, 2003	XB	22/100	20.48%
Charlie's Angels	Ubisoft	July 8, 2003	GCN	23/100	23.74%
Pulse Racer	Jaleco	January 2, 2003	XB	24/100	27.75%
Batman: Dark Tomorrow	Kemco	March 18, 2003	XB	25/100	24.06%
Terminator 3: War of the Machines	Atari	November, 2003	WIN	25/100	27.67%
Aquaman: Battle for Atlantis	TDK Mediactive	July 23, 2003	GCN	27/100	25.1%
Aquaman: Battle for Atlantis	TDK Mediactive	July 30, 2003	XB	26/100	30.87%
Mucha Lucha! Mascaritas of the Lost Code	Ubisoft	November 18, 2003	GBA	26/100	26.08%
Charlie's Angels: Angel X	Sony Online Entertainment	June 20, 2003	WIN	38/100	43.07&
Stake: Fortune Fighters	Metro3D, Inc.	May 5, 2003	XB	26/100	31%
Ultimate Demolition Derby	Global Star Software	September 16, 2003	WIN	27/100	32.33%
Celebrity Deathmatch	Gotham Games	October 14, 2003	WIN	30/100	27.42%
Batman: Dark Tomorrow	Kemco	March 21, 2003	GCN	29/100	27.83%
Mistmare	Strategy First	June 30, 2003	WIN	33/100	28.14%
Puzzle Bobble VS	Taito	October 6, 2003	NGE	N/A	28.73%
Interstellar Trader 2	Shrapnel Games	March 21, 2003	WIN	31/100	29%
RoboCop	Titus Interactive	July 24, 2003	XB	30/100	40.75%
Airport Tycoon 2	Global Star Software	February 26, 2003	WIN	32/100	31%
Ring II: Twilight of Gods	Global Star Software	September 16, 2003	WIN	31/100	35%
Celebrity Deathmatch	Gotham Games	October 14, 2003	PS2	32/100	36.76%
Yu Yu Hakusho: Spirit Detective	Atari	December 9, 2003	GBA	33/100	39.67%
American Idol	Codemasters	November 7, 2003	WIN	39/100	33.17%
Terminator 3: Rise of the Machines	Atari	November 11, 2003	XB	35/100	41.06%
Fugitive Hunter: War on Terror	Encore, Inc.	November 18, 2003	PS2	35/100	42.71%
Celebrity Deathmatch	Gotham Games	October 14, 2003	XB	36/100	35.83%
MotoGP	THQ	November 14, 2003	NGE	N/A	35.85%
Ozzy & Drix	Midway Games	December 16, 2003	GBA	36/100	45.6%
Dragon Ball Z: Taiketsu	Atari	November 24, 2003	GBA	40/100	37.4%

== Major events ==
Date	Event	Ref.
February 19	Microsoft announces a deal to buy Connectix Corporation.	
February 27	Academy of Interactive Arts & Sciences hosts 6th Annual Interactive Achievement Awards; inducts Yu Suzuki of Sega to the AIAS Hall of Fame.	
March 6–9	Game Developers Conference hosts 3rd annual Game Developers Choice Awards and Gama Network's 5th annual Independent Games Festival (IGF).	
March 23	Nintendo stops production of the original Game Boy and Game Boy Color worldwide.	
April 1	Enix Corporation and Square Co., Ltd. officially merge, forming Square Enix Co., Ltd.	
April	Pan European Game Information (PEGI), a European video game content rating system, comes into use.	
May 7	Infogrames Entertainment, SA rebrands all its subsidiaries under the Atari brand.	
May 14–16	9th annual E3 (Electronic Entertainment Expo) held at Los Angeles Convention Center; 6th annual Game Critics Awards for the Best of E3.	
May	The 3DO Company announces bankruptcy and closes down its New World Computing subsidiary.	
June 12	Obsidian Entertainment founded.	
July 16	Interactive Digital Software Association (IDSA) renamed as Entertainment Software Association (ESA).	
July	IEMA (Interactive Entertainment Merchants Association) hosts 4th annual Executive Summit.	
August 1	Virgin Interactive is renamed to Avalon Interactive by its owner Titus Software.	
August	Microsoft announced ATI as the developer of the GPU for their next generation console, Project Xenon. Their previous contract with Nvidia was finished but the GPU of the Xbox continued in production.	
September 12	Valve releases their game distribution software Steam out of beta.	
September 23	Nintendo stops production of the Family Computer and Super Famicom in Japan.	
September	Silicon Dreams Studio goes defunct.	
October 1	DreamWorks SKG and Tecmo announce a movie adaptation of the video game Fatal Frame has been fast-tracked with John Rogers and Steven Spielberg's involvement.	
October 12–18	The 2003 World Cyber Games are held.	
October 20	Families of Aaron Hamel and Kimberly Bede, two young adults shot by teens William and Josh Buckner (who in statements to investigators claimed their actions were inspired by Grand Theft Auto III), file a US$246 million lawsuit against developer Rockstar Games, publisher Take-Two Interactive, retailer Walmart, and console-maker Sony.	
October 31	British Academy of Film and Television Arts announces that nominations for the 6th annual BAFTA Interactive Entertainment Awards will instead be split between the 1st annual BAFTA Games Awards for video game publications and (on November 24) the BAFTA Interactive Awards for multimedia technologies; ceremonies to be held in February 2004.	
November	Kazushige Nojima resigns from Square Enix.	
December 2	The inaugural Spike Video Game Awards are held.	
December	Interplay closes its Black Isle Studios division.	
Unknown	First PlayStation Portable prototype shown by Sony.	
Unknown	Nintendo states that its next generation console would be fully compatible with the GameCube.	
Unknown	Compile goes defunct.	
Unknown	Take-Two Interactive buys TDK Mediactive, Inc.	
Unknown	CNN Money reports that video games are a US$10 billion industry	
Unknown	Nintendo buys shares from Japanese toy and animation conglomerate Bandai making Nintendo one of Bandai's top 10 shareholders.	
Unknown	Data East goes defunct.	

== Hardware releases ==
Nintendo released the Game Boy Advance SP, the second & declared as the definitive model of the Game Boy Advance (it's also been declared as the best entry in the Game Boy family overall). The GBA SP was the first handheld Nintendo console to have a rechargeable battery powered by an AC Adapter instead of using AA batteries.

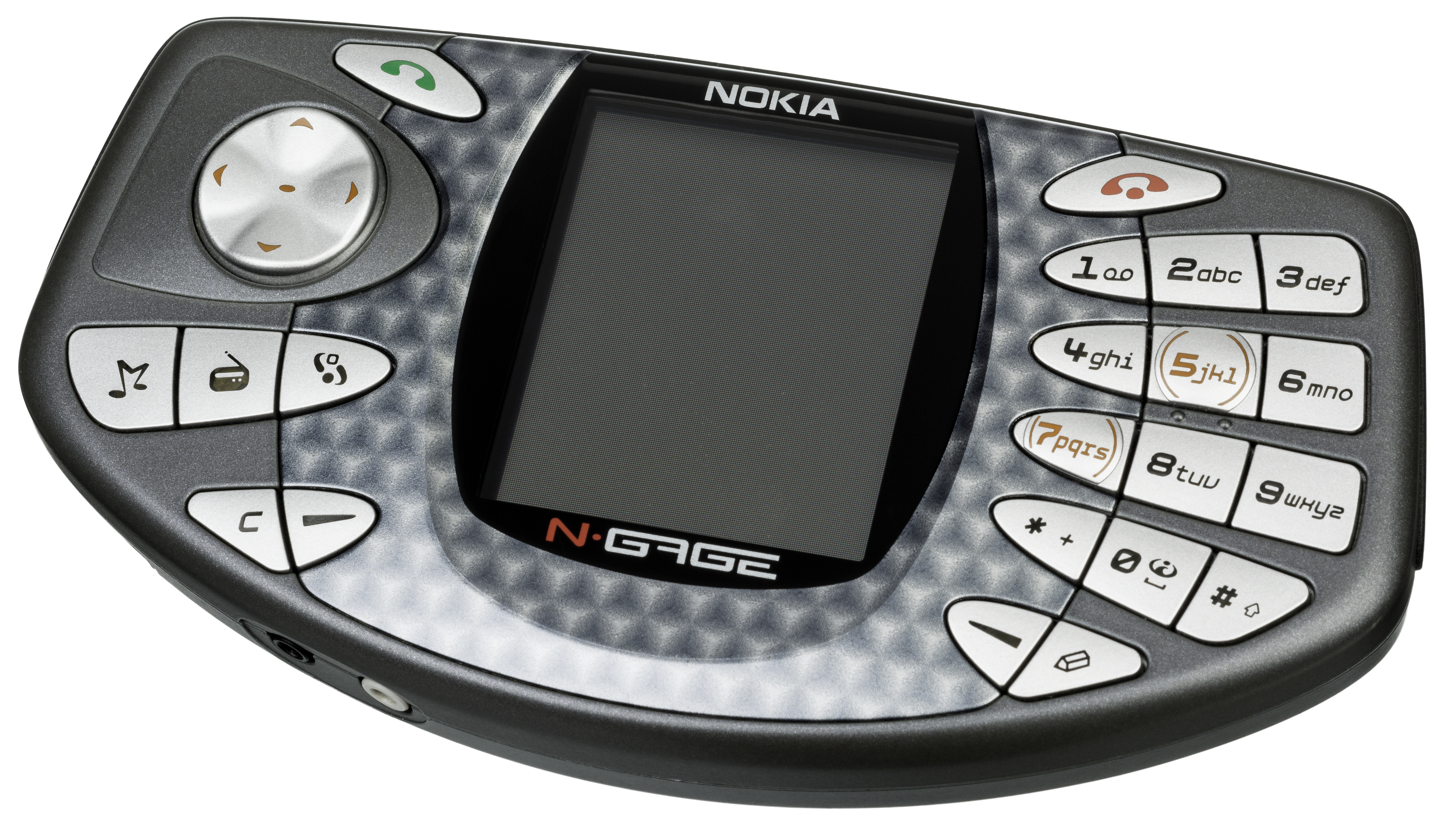
Nokia N-Gage

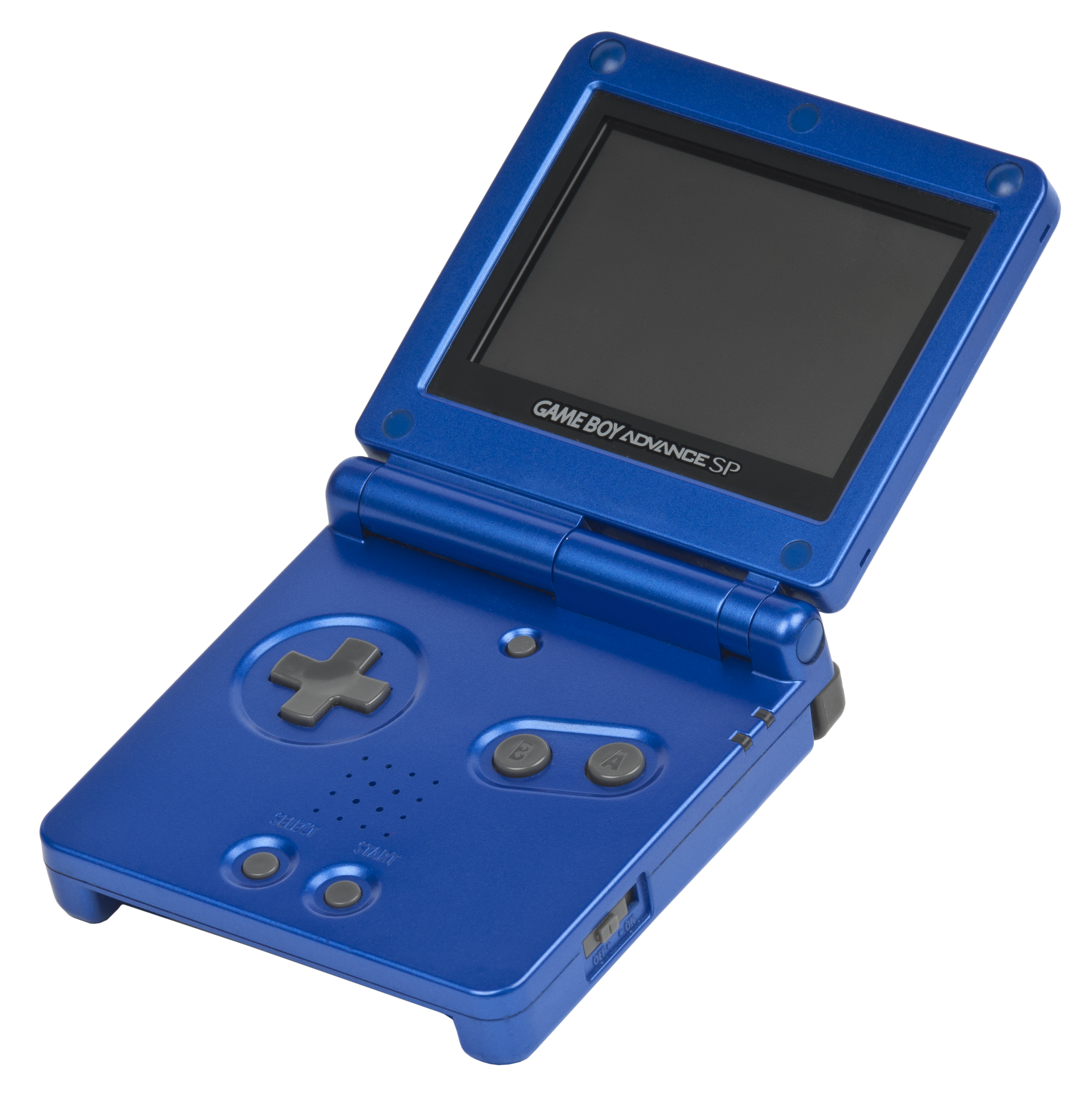
Game Boy Advance SP

Date	System	Ref.
February 14	Game Boy Advance SP^{JP}	
March 23	Game Boy Advance SP^{NA}	
March 28	Game Boy Advance SP^{PAL}	
August 13	PlayStation 2^{IND}	
October 7	N-Gage	

== Games released in 2003 ==
Release date	Title	Platform	Genre	Developer	Publisher	Ref.
January 3	Super Bubble Pop	GCN, GBA				
January 7	Crash Bandicoot 2: N-Tranced	GBA				
January 11	Dynasty Warriors 3: Xtreme Legends	PS2				
January 12	Panzer Dragoon Orta	XB				
January 14	SimCity 4	WIN				
January 19	The Getaway	PS2				
January 20	Battle Engine Aquila	PS2, XB				
January 22	Dead or Alive Xtreme Beach Volleyball	XB				
January 25	Devil May Cry 2	PS2				
January 26	Black & Bruised	GCN, PS2				
January 26	HSX: Hypersonic.Xtreme	PS2				
February 3	Unreal II: The Awakening	WIN				
February 6	GT Advance 3: Pro Concept Racing	GBA				
February 7	Shadow of Memories (EU)	WIN				
February 10	Command & Conquer: Generals	WIN				
February 10	.hack//Infection Part 1	PS2				
February 11	Capcom vs. SNK EO	XB				
February 12	Knight Rider: The Game	WIN, PS2				
February 12	Yu-Gi-Oh! Dungeon Dice Monsters	GBA				
February 13	Tom Clancy's Splinter Cell	WIN				
February 15	Disaster Report	PS2				
February 15	Space Station 13	WIN				
February 16	Yu-Gi-Oh! The Duelists of the Roses	PS2				
February 17	Dark Cloud 2	PS2				
February 20	Shin Megami Tensei III: Nocturne	PS2				
February 21	I.G.I.-2: Covert Strike	WIN				
February 21	Rayman 3: Hoodlum Havoc	GCN, GBA				
February 24	Everblue 2	PS2				
February 24	Indiana Jones and the Emperor's Tomb	XB				
February 25	EverQuest: The Legacy of Ykesha	WIN				
February 25	Master of Orion III	WIN				
February 26	Xenosaga Episode I: Der Wille zur Macht	PS2				
February 27	Men in Black II: Alien Escape	GCN				
February 28	Praetorians	WIN				
March 3	Tenchu: Wrath of Heaven	PS2				
March 4	Murakumo: Renegade Mech Pursuit	XB				
March 4	Freelancer	WIN				
March 9	Sonic Advance 2	GBA				
March 10	Jurassic Park: Operation Genesis	WIN				
March 10	MLB 2004	PS2				
March 10	World Series Baseball 2K3	PS2, XB				
March 10	Zone of the Enders: The Second Runner	PS2				
March 11	Mega Man & Bass	GBA				
March 11	Piglet's Big Game	GBA				
March 14	Rayman 3: Hoodlum Havoc	PS2, XB				
March 14	Tom and Jerry in Infurnal Escape	GBA				
March 19	Pokémon Ruby and Sapphire (NA)	GBA	Monster tamer			
March 17	WWE Crush Hour	GCN, PS2				
March 18	Rayman 3: Hoodlum Havoc	WIN				
March 19	Bloody Roar 3	GCN				
March 19	Mobile Light Force 2	PS2				
March 19	Tom Clancy's Rainbow Six 3: Raven Shield	WIN				
March 20	Pride FC: Fighting Championships	PS2				
March 24	Amplitude	PS2				
March 24	The Legend of Zelda: The Wind Waker (NA)	GCN				
March 25	Batman: Dark Tomorrow	GCN				
March 25	Dragon Ball Z: Ultimate Battle 22	PS1				
March 25	Dynasty Warriors 4	PS2				
March 25	Jurassic Park: Operation Genesis	PS2				
March 25	Primal	PS2				
March 25	Samurai Jack: The Amulet of Time	GBA				
March 25	Ed, Edd n Eddy: Jawbreakers!	GBA				
March 26	Galactic Civilizations	WIN				
March 26	Indiana Jones and the Emperor's Tomb	WIN				
March 26	Jurassic Park: Operation Genesis	XB				
March 26	Superman: Countdown to Apokolips	GBA				
March 27	Metal Gear Solid 2: Substance	WIN				
March 30	Marvel vs. Capcom 2: New Age of Heroes	XB				
April 8	Midnight Club II	WIN, PS2				
April 9	Burnout 2: Point of Impact	GCN				
April 9	Crazy Taxi: Catch a Ride	GBA				
April 14	Postal 2	WIN				
April 14	Golden Sun: The Lost Age	GBA				
April 15	Ikaruga	GCN				
April 16	Godzilla: Destroy All Monsters Melee	XB				
April 17	Final Fantasy XI: Rise of the Zilart (JP)	WIN, PS2				
April 17	Pinobee: Wings of Adventure	PS1				
April 20	Siren	PS2				
April 22	Ninja Five-O	GBA				
April 30	RoboCop	WIN				
April 30	MLB 2004	PS1				
May 1	Burnout 2: Point of Impact	XB				
May 6	Castlevania: Aria of Sorrow	GBA				
May 6	Day of Defeat	WIN				
May 6	Eve Online (JP)	WIN				
May 12	Finding Nemo	GCN, PS2, XB, GBA				
May 12	Grand Theft Auto: Vice City	WIN				
May 12	Iridion II	GBA				
May 12	The Sims: Superstar	WIN				
May 14	Enter The Matrix	WIN, GCN, PS2, XB				
May 20	Inside Pitch 2003	XB				
May 20	Rise of Nations	WIN				
May 20	PlanetSide	WIN				
May 23	Silent Hill 3	PS2				
May 21	WarioWare Inc.: Mega Microgame$	GBA				
May 23	Ghost Master	WIN				
May 27	Brute Force	XB				
May 28	Hulk	WIN, PS2, GCN, XB				
May 28	The Incredible Hulk	GBA				
June 1	Sonic Pinball Party	GBA				
June 2	Toontown Online	WIN				
June 3	Midnight Club II	XB				
June 9	Donkey Kong Country	GBA				
June 17	Mega Man Network Transmission	GCN				
June 17	Space Channel 5: Ulala's Cosmic Attack	GBA				
June 17	Unlimited Saga	PS2				
June 18	Sonic Adventure DX: Director's Cut	GCN				
June 19	Drome Racers	GBA				
June 19	Mace Griffin: Bounty Hunter	WIN, PS2, XB				
June 20	Neighbours from Hell	WIN				
June 20	Star Trek: Elite Force II	WIN				
June 20	Tomb Raider: The Angel of Darkness	PS2				
June 23	Advance Wars 2: Black Hole Rising	GBA				
June 23	Rock 'N Roll Racing	GBA				
June 24	Buffy the Vampire Slayer: Wrath of the Darkhul King	GBA				
June 24	Magic Pengel: The Quest for Color	PS2				
June 24	Mega Man Battle Network 3	GBA				
June 24	Stuntman	GBA				
June 24	Wario World	GCN				
June 25	Arc the Lad: Twilight of the Spirits	PS2				
June 26	Indiana Jones and the Emperor's Tomb	PS2				
June 30	Ape Escape 2	PS2				
June 30	The Simpsons: Road Rage	GBA				
July 1	Pirates of the Caribbean	XB				
July 1	Warcraft III: The Frozen Throne	WIN				
July 1	Tomb Raider: The Angel of Darkness	WIN				
July 9	Charlie's Angels	GCN, PS2				
July 9	Star Wars Galaxies: An Empire Divided	WIN				
July 16	NCAA Football 2004	GCN, PS2, XB				
July 17	Star Wars: Knights of the Old Republic	XB				
July 17	The Italian Job	GCN				
July 23	Aquaman: Battle for Atlantis	GCN				
July 23	Dinotopia: The Sunstone Odyssey	XB				
July 23	The Great Escape	WIN, PS2, XB				
July 24	RoboCop	XB				
July 28	Mario Golf: Toadstool Tour	GCN				
July 30	Aquaman: Battle for Atlantis	XB				
July 30	Shrek: Reekin' Havoc	GBA				
July 31	Butt-Ugly Martians: Zoom or Doom	PS2				
August 5	Chaos Legion	WIN, PS2				
August 5	Freaky Flyers	PS2, XB				
August 6	SplashDown: Rides Gone Wild	PS2				
August 8	Freaky Flyers	GCN				
August 12	Futurama	PS2, XB				
August 13	Virtua Fighter 4: Evolution	PS2				
August 14	Tony Hawk's Pro Skater 4	WIN				
August 15	Pirates of the Caribbean	WIN				
August 19	Alter Echo	PS2, XB				
August 22	Nancy Drew: The Haunted Carousel	WIN				
August 25	F-Zero GX	GCN				
August 27	Bombastic	PS2				
August 27	Buffy the Vampire Slayer: Chaos Bleeds	PS2, XB				
August 27	Otogi: Myth of Demons	XB				
August 27	Rescue Heroes: Billy Blazes	GBA				
August 27	Soul Calibur II	PS2, XB, GCN				
August 28	Buffy the Vampire Slayer: Chaos Bleeds	GCN				
September 4	Battlefield 1942: Secret Weapons of WWII	WIN				
September 5	Power Rangers: Ninja Storm	GBA				
September 8	Anarchy Online: The Shadowlands	WIN				
September 8	Final Fantasy Tactics Advance	GBA				
September 8	WWE WrestleMania XIX	GCN				
September 9	Counter-Strike	WIN				
September 9	EverQuest: Lost Dungeons of Norrath	WIN				
September 9	P.N.03	GCN				
September 10	Banjo-Kazooie: Grunty's Revenge	GBA				
September 11	Road Rash: Jailbreak	GBA				
September 12	Starsky & Hutch	GBA				
September 14	Asterix & Obelix: Kick Buttix	PS2				
September 16	Boktai: The Sun Is in Your Hand	GBA				
September 16	Dino Crisis 3	XB				
September 16	Homeworld 2	WIN				
September 16	NASCAR Thunder 2004	WIN, PS1, PS2, XB				
September 16	The Simpsons: Hit & Run	PS2, XB, GCN				
September 17	Dungeons & Dragons: Heroes	XB				
September 17	Star Wars Jedi Knight: Jedi Academy	WIN				
September 22	Command & Conquer: Generals – Zero Hour	WIN				
September 22	NHL 2004	WIN, GCN, PS2, XB				
September 22	Tiger Woods PGA Tour 2004	WIN, GCN, PS2, XB				
September 23	DDRMAX2: Dance Dance Revolution	PS2,				
September 24	The Adventures of Jimmy Neutron Boy Genius: Jet Fusion	GBA				
September 24	Digimon Battle Spirit 2	GBA				
September 24	Oddworld: Munch's Oddysee	GBA				
October 1	Etherlords II	WIN				
October 1	Freedom Fighters	WIN, PS2, XB, GCN				
October 3	Nancy Drew: Danger on Deception Island	WIN				
October 6	DemiKids: Light Version	GBA				
October 7	Backyard Wrestling: Don't Try This at Home	PS2				
October 7	DemiKids: Dark Version	GBA				
October 7	Sonic Advance	NGE				
October 7	Viewtiful Joe	GCN				
October 13	Kirby Air Ride	GCN				
October 14	Cyber Troopers Virtual-On MARZ	PS2				
October 14	Jak II	PS2				
October 14	Max Payne 2: The Fall of Max Payne	WIN				
October 14	Mega Man X7	PS2				
October 14	Mega Man Zero 2	GBA				
October 14	The Haunted Mansion	GCN, PS2, XB				
October 15	Tak and the Power of Juju	GCN, PS2, GBA				
October 17	Judge Dredd: Dredd vs. Death (EU)	WIN, PS2, XB				
October 20	SSX 3	XB, GCN				
October 21	Castlevania: Lament of Innocence	PS2				
October 21	Crimson Skies: High Road to Revenge	XB				
October 21	ESPN NBA Basketball	PS2, XB				
October 21	SSX 3	PS2				
October 21	Teenage Mutant Ninja Turtles	WIN, GCN, PS2, XB				
October 21	Time Crisis 3	PS2				
October 22	SeaWorld Adventure Parks Tycoon	WIN				
October 24	The Hobbit	GBA				
October 26	Super Duper Sumos	GBA				
October 26	Super Mario Advance 4: Super Mario Bros. 3	GBA				
October 27	Spyro: Attack of the Rhynocs	GBA				
October 27	Tony Hawk's Underground	PS2, XB, GCN, GBA				
October 27	WWE SmackDown! Here Comes the Pain	PS2				
October 28	Amped 2	XB				
October 28	Dragon Ball Z: Budokai	GCN				
October 28	Final Fantasy XI (NA)	WIN				
October 28	Harry Potter: Quidditch World Cup	WIN, GCN, PS2, XB, GBA				
October 28	SWAT: Global Strike Team	PS2, XB				
October 28	Top Spin	XB				
October 29	Call of Duty	WIN				
October 29	SpongeBob SquarePants: Battle for Bikini Bottom	WIN, GCN, PS2, XB, GBA				
October 31	Silent Hill 3	WIN				
November 3	Drake of the 99 Dragons	XB				
November 3	Fire Emblem: The Blazing Blade	GBA				
November 3	The Lord of the Rings: The Return of the King	WIN				
November 3	True Crime: Streets of LA	PS2, XB, GCN				
November 4	Civilization III: Conquests	WIN				
November 4	Grand Theft Auto III	XB				
November 4	Grand Theft Auto: Vice City	XB				
November 4	The Lord of the Rings: The Return of the King	PS2				
November 4	SOCOM II U.S. Navy SEALs	PS2				
November 4	Tiger Woods PGA Tour 2004	GBA				
November 4	Yu-Gi-Oh! The Falsebound Kingdom	GCN				
November 5	The Lord of the Rings: The Return of the King	GCN, XB, GBA				
November 6	Prince of Persia: The Sands of Time	PS2				
November 10	Sphinx and the Cursed Mummy	GCN, PS2, XB				
November 11	Beyond Good & Evil	PS2				
November 11	Looney Tunes: Back in Action	GBA				
November 11	Mario Party 5	GCN				
November 11	Medal of Honor: Rising Sun	PS2, XB, GCN				
November 11	Muppets Party Cruise	GCN				
November 11	Onimusha Tactics	GBA				
November 11	Ratchet & Clank: Going Commando	PS2				
November 11	SSX 3	GBA				
November 11	The Hobbit	WIN, GCN, PS2, XB				
November 11	Uru: Ages Beyond Myst	WIN				
November 11	Legacy of Kain: Defiance	WIN, PS2, XB				
November 12	Disney's Magical Quest 2 Starring Mickey & Minnie	GBA				
November 12	Prince of Persia: The Sands of Time	XB				
November 12	Tom Clancy's Rainbow Six 3: Raven Shield	XB				
November 13	Double Dragon Advance	GBA				
November 13	Monster Rancher 4	PS2				
November 13	Muppets Party Cruise	PS2				
November 13	The Simpsons: Hit & Run	WIN				
November 14	Broken Sword: The Sleeping Dragon	WIN, PS2, XB				
November 15	Crash Nitro Kart	PS2, XB, GCN, GBA, NGE				
November 17	Harvest Moon: Friends of Mineral Town	GBA				
November 17	The Legend of Zelda: Collector's Edition	GCN				
November 17	Mario & Luigi: Superstar Saga	GBA				
November 17	Mario Kart: Double Dash	GCN				
November 17	Need for Speed: Underground (NA)	WIN, GCN, PS2, XB				
November 18	America's 10 Most Wanted	WIN, PS2				
November 18	American Idol	GBA				
November 18	Counter-Strike	XB				
November 18	Go! Go! Hypergrind	GCN				
November 18	Kya: Dark Lineage	PS2				
November 18	Final Fantasy X-2	PS2				
November 18	Manhunt	PS2				
November 18	Metal Arms: Glitch in the System	PS2, XB				
November 18	Prince of Persia: The Sands of Time	GCN				
November 18	Space Channel 5 Special Edition	PS2				
November 18	Spy Muppets: License to Croak	GBA				
November 18	Star Wars: Flight of the Falcon	GBA				
November 18	Star Wars: Knights of the Old Republic	WIN				
November 18	Terminator 3: Rise of the Machines	GBA				
November 18	The Fairly OddParents: Breakin' da Rules	WIN, GCN, PS2, XB, GBA				
November 18	Tonka: Rescue Patrol	GCN				
November 18	Victoria: An Empire Under the Sun	WIN				
November 18	Whiplash	PS2, XB				
November 18	XIII	WIN, GCN, PS2, XB				
November 19	Beyond Good & Evil	WIN				
November 19	Star Wars Jedi Knight: Jedi Academy	XB				
November 20	Big Rigs: Over the Road Racing	WIN				
November 24	Dragon Ball Z: Taiketsu	GBA				
November 25	Max Payne 2: The Fall of Max Payne	XB				
November 25	Mysterious Journey II	WIN				
November 26	BlowOut	GCN, XB				
November 28	SpellForce: The Order of Dawn	WIN				
November 30	Prince of Persia: The Sands of Time	WIN				
December 1	1080° Avalanche	GCN				
December 2	Armed and Dangerous	WIN, XB				
December 2	Beyond Good & Evil	XB				
December 2	Deus Ex: Invisible War	WIN, XB				
December 2	Max Payne 2: The Fall of Max Payne	PS2				
December 2	Mission: Impossible – Operation Surma	XB, GBA				
December 2	Pac-Man Vs.	GCN				
December 2	The Sims Bustin' Out	GBA				
December 3	Gotcha Force	GCN				
December 5	Counter-Strike (EU)	XB				
December 4	Sonic Heroes	PS2, XB, GCN				
December 8	Mission: Impossible – Operation Surma	PS2				
December 9	Crouching Tiger, Hidden Dragon	XB				
December 9	Yu Yu Hakusho: Spirit Detective	GBA				
December 10	Fatal Frame II: Crimson Butterfly	PS2				
December 11	Beyond Good & Evil	GCN				
December 12	Judge Dredd: Dredd vs. Death (EU)	GCN				
December 14	Medabots Infinity	GCN				

== See also ==
- 2003 in games
