= 7th Annual Interactive Achievement Awards =

Video game award ceremony

- Date: March 4, 2004
- Venue: Palms Casino Resort
- Country: Las Vegas, Nevada, USA
- Hosted by: Diane Mizota

Highlights
- Most awards: Prince of Persia: The Sands of Time (8)
- Most nominations: Prince of Persia: The Sands of Time (13)
- Game of the Year: Call of Duty
- Hall of Fame: Peter Molyneux

The 7th Annual Interactive Achievement Awards was the 7th edition of the Interactive Achievement Awards, an annual awards event that honored the best games in the video game industry during 2003. The awards were arranged by the Academy of Interactive Arts & Sciences (AIAS), and were held at the Palms Casino Resort in Las Vegas, Nevada on March 4, 2004. It was also held as part of the Academy's 2004 D.I.C.E. Summit. It was hosted by Diane Mizota.

The craft awards for "Outstanding Achievement in Character Performance" for males and females were introduced along with "Outstanding Achievement in Soundtrack." Separate console awards for "Action Sports" and "Sports Simulation" were offered. Separate awards for "Children's Title of the Year" and "Family Game of the Year" would be offered for both console and computer; however, there were not any finalists named for "Computer Children's Title of the Year". "Wireless Game of the Year" would be offered in addition to "Handheld Game of the Year". The computer award for "Downloadable Game of the Year" was introduced. "Online Gameplay of the Year" was not offered at this awards ceremony.

Call of Duty won the top award of the ceremony for "Game of the Year". Prince of Persia: The Sands of Time received the most nominations and won the most awards. Electronic Arts received the most nominations, won the most awards, published the most nominated games, and published the most award-winning games. There was also a tie for two categories: "Outstanding Achievement in Character Performance - Female" and "Console Family Game of the Year". The Sims and developer Maxis had two award-winning releases, with The Sims Bustin' Out tying for "Console Family Game of the Year", and The Sims: Superstar expansion winning "Computer Simulation Game of the Year". Final Fantasy and developer SquareSoft also had two winners with Final Fantasy Tactics Advance winning "Handheld Game of the Year" and Tara Strong as Rikku in Final Fantasy X-2 tying for "Outstanding Achievement in Character Performance - Female".

Peter Molyneux was inducted into the Academy of Interactive Arts & Sciences Hall of Fame.

== Winners and Nominees ==
Winners are listed first, highlighted in boldface, and indicated with a double dagger (‡).

**Game of the Year**: **Call of Duty** — **Infinity Ward**, **Activision**‡; Command & Conquer: Generals — EA Pacific; Max Payne 2: The Fall of Max Payne — Remedy Entertainment, Rockstar Games; Prince of Persia: The Sands of Time — Ubisoft Montreal; Ratchet & Clank: Going Commando — Insomniac Games, Sony Computer Entertainment; Rise of Nations — Big Huge Games, Microsoft Game Studios; SSX 3 — EA Canada; Star Wars: Knights of the Old Republic — BioWare, LucasArts; The Legend of Zelda: The Wind Waker — Nintendo EAD
**Console Game of the Year**: **Prince of Persia: The Sands of Time** — **Ubisoft Montreal**‡; Ratchet & Clank: Going Commando — Insomniac Games, Sony Computer Entertainment; SSX 3 — EA Canada; Star Wars: Knights of the Old Republic — BioWare, LucasArts; The Legend of Zelda: The Wind Waker — Nintendo EAD	**Computer Game of the Year**: **Call of Duty** — **Infinity Ward**, **Activision**‡; Command & Conquer: Generals — EA Pacific; Max Payne 2: The Fall of Max Payne — Remedy Entertainment, Rockstar Games; Prince of Persia: The Sands of Time — Ubisoft Montreal; Rise of Nations — Big Huge Games, Microsoft Game Studios; Star Wars: Knights of the Old Republic — BioWare, LucasArts

=== Innovation Awards ===
**Outstanding Innovation in Computer Gaming**: **Prince of Persia: The Sands of Time** — **Ubisoft Montreal**‡; Call of Duty — Infinity Ward, Activision; Rise of Nations — Big Huge Games, Microsoft Game Studios; Star Wars: Knights of the Old Republic — BioWare, LucasArts; Tron 2.0 — Monolith Productions, Buena Vista Games	**Outstanding Innovation in Console Gaming**: **EyeToy: Play** — **SCE London Studio**‡; Prince of Persia: The Sands of Time — Ubisoft Montreal; SSX 3 — EA Canada; Star Wars: Knights of the Old Republic — BioWare, LucasArts; The Legend of Zelda: The Wind Waker — Nintendo EAD

=== Craft Awards ===
**Outstanding Achievement in Game Design**: **Prince of Persia: The Sands of Time** — **Ubisoft Montreal**‡; Amplitude — Harmonix, Sony Computer Entertainment; Star Wars: Knights of the Old Republic — BioWare, LucasArts; The Legend of Zelda: The Wind Waker — Nintendo EAD; Tony Hawk's Underground — Neversoft, Activision	**Outstanding Achievement in Character or Story Development**: **Star Wars: Knights of the Old Republic** — **BioWare**, **LucasArts**‡; Beyond Good & Evil — Ubisoft Montpellier; Prince of Persia: The Sands of Time — Ubisoft Montreal; Ratchet & Clank: Going Commando — Insomniac Games, Sony Computer Entertainment; The Legend of Zelda: The Wind Waker — Nintendo EAD
**Outstanding Achievement in Animation**: **Prince of Persia: The Sands of Time** — **Ubisoft Montreal**‡; Beyond Good & Evil — Ubisoft Montpellier; Jak II — Naughty Dog, Sony Computer Entertainment; Ratchet & Clank: Going Commando — Insomniac Games, Sony Computer Entertainment; Soulcalibur II — Project Soul, Namco	**Outstanding Achievement in Art Direction**: **The Legend of Zelda: The Wind Waker** — **Nintendo EAD**‡; Final Fantasy X-2 — SquareSoft, Square Electronic Arts; Jak II — Naughty Dog, Sony Computer Entertainment; Prince of Persia: The Sands of Time — Ubisoft Montreal; Ratchet & Clank: Going Commando — Insomniac Games, Sony Computer Entertainment
**Outstanding Achievement in Character Performance - Male**: **Elijah Wood** as **Frodo Baggins** (**The Lord of the Rings: The Return of the King**) — **EA Redwood Shores**‡; Method Man (Def Jam Vendetta) — AKI Corporation, EA Canada; James McCaffrey as Max Payne (Max Payne 2: The Fall of Max Payne) — Remedy Entertainment, Rockstar Games; Michael Ironside as Sam Fisher (Tom Clancy's Splinter Cell) — Ubisoft Montreal; Snoop Dogg (True Crime: Streets of LA) — Luxoflux, Activision	**Outstanding Achievement in Character Performance - Female**: **Jada Pinkett Smith** as **Niobe** (**Enter the Matrix**) — **Shiny Entertainment**, **Atari**‡; **Tara Strong** as **Rikku** (**Final Fantasy X-2**) — **SquareSoft**, **Square Electronic Arts**‡; Christina Milian as Angel (Def Jam Vendetta) — AKI Corporation, EA Canada; Anna Garduño as Keira (Jak II) — Naughty Dog, Sony Computer Entertainment; Anna Edwards as Yasmin (The Getaway) — SCE Team Soho
**Outstanding Achievement in Licensed Soundtrack**: **SSX 3** — **EA Canada**‡; Madden NFL 2004 — EA Tiburon; NBA Live 2004 — EA Canada; Tony Hawk's Underground — Neversoft, Activision; True Crime: Streets of LA — Luxoflux, Activision	**Outstanding Achievement in Original Music Composition**: **Medal of Honor: Rising Sun** — **EA Los Angeles**‡; Beyond Good & Evil — Ubisoft Montpellier; Call of Duty — Infinity Ward, Activision; Grabbed by the Ghoulies — Rare, Microsoft Game Studios; XIII — Southend Interactive, Ubisoft Paris
**Outstanding Achievement in Sound Design**: **The Lord of the Rings: The Return of the King** — **EA Redwood Shores**‡; Amplitude — Harmonix, Sony Computer Entertainment; Beyond Good & Evil — Ubisoft Montpellier; Call of Duty — Infinity Ward, Activision; Tom Clancy's Rainbow Six 3: Raven Shield — Red Storm Entertainment, Ubisoft Montreal, Ubisoft Milan	**Outstanding Achievement in Gameplay Engineering**: **Prince of Persia: The Sands of Time** — **Ubisoft Montreal**‡; Jak II — Naughty Dog, Sony Computer Entertainment; Star Wars: Knights of the Old Republic — BioWare, LucasArts; The Legend of Zelda: The Wind Waker — Nintendo EAD
**Outstanding Achievement in Visual Engineering**: **Prince of Persia: The Sands of Time** — **Ubisoft Montreal**‡; Jak II — Naughty Dog, Sony Computer Entertainment; Ratchet & Clank: Going Commando — Insomniac Games, Sony Computer Entertainment; SSX 3 — EA Canada; The Legend of Zelda: The Wind Waker — Nintendo EAD

=== Console Awards ===
**Console Platform Action/Adventure Game of the Year**: **Prince of Persia: The Sands of Time** — **Ubisoft Montreal**‡; Jak II — Naughty Dog, Sony Computer Entertainment; Ratchet & Clank: Going Commando — Insomniac Games, Sony Computer Entertainment; The Legend of Zelda: The Wind Waker — Nintendo EAD; Viewtiful Joe — Clover Studio, Capcom	**Console Action/Adventure Game of the Year**: **Crimson Skies: High Road to Revenge** — **FASA Interactive**, **Microsoft Game Studios**‡; Manhunt — Rockstar North; Max Payne 2: The Fall of Max Payne — Remedy Entertainment, Rockstar Games; Metal Arms: Glitch in the System — Swingin' Ape Studios, Mass Media Games, Sierra Entertainment, Vivendi Universal Games; The Simpsons: Hit & Run — Radical Entertainment, Sierra Entertainment, Vivendi Universal Games
**Console Action Sports Game of the Year**: **SSX 3** — **EA Canada**‡; NBA Street Vol. 2 — EA Canada; NHL Hitz Pro — Next Level Games, Midway Games; Tony Hawk's Underground — Neversoft, Activision	**Console Sports Simulation Game of the Year**: **Madden NFL 2004** — **EA Tiburon**‡; ESPN NHL Hockey — Kush Games, Sega; NCAA Football 2004 — EA Tiburon; Tiger Woods PGA Tour 2004 — EA Redwood Shores; Top Spin — PAM Development, Microsoft Game Studios; World Soccer Winning Eleven 6 International — Konami
**Console Children's Title of the Year**: **Mario Party 5** — **Hudson Soft**, **Nintendo**‡; Backyard Basketball — Humongous Entertainment, Atari; SpongeBob SquarePants: Battle for Bikini Bottom — Heavy Iron Studios, THQ; Tak and the Power of Juju — Avalanche Software, THQ	**Console First-Person Action Game of the Year**: **Tom Clancy's Rainbow Six 3: Raven Shield** — **Red Storm Entertainment**, **Ubisoft Montreal**, **Ubisoft Milan**‡; Deus Ex: Invisible War — Ion Storm, Eidos Interactive
**Console Family Game of the Year**: **EyeToy: Play** — **SCE London Studio**‡; **The Sims Bustin' Out** — **Maxis**, **Electronic Arts**‡; Amplitude — Harmonix, Sony Computer Entertainment; Grabbed by the Ghoulies — Rare, Microsoft Game Studios	**Console Role-Playing Game of the Year**: **Star Wars: Knights of the Old Republic** — **BioWare**, **LucasArts**‡; Dark Cloud 2 — Level-5, Sony Computer Entertainment; Disgaea: Hour of Darkness — Nippon Ichi Software, Atlus; Final Fantasy X-2 — SquareSoft, Square Electronic Arts; Xenosaga Episode I — Monolith Soft, Namco
**Console Fighting Game of the Year**: **Soulcalibur II** — **Namco**; Def Jam Vendetta — EA Canada, AKI Corporation; Dragon Ball Z: Budokai 2 — Dimps, Atari; Virtua Fighter 4: Evolution — Sega AM2; War of the Monsters — Incognito Entertainment, Sony Computer Entertainment; WWE SmackDown! Here Comes the Pain — Yuke's, THQ	**Console Racing Game of the Year**: **Need for Speed: Underground** — **EA Black Box**‡; Burnout 2: Point of Impact — Criterion Games, Acclaim Entertainment; F-Zero GX — Amusement Vision, Nintendo; Mario Kart: Double Dash — Nintendo EAD; Project Gotham Racing 2 — Bizarre Creations, Microsoft Game Studios

=== Handheld Awards ===
**Handheld Game of the Year**
- **Final Fantasy Tactics Advance** — **SquareSoft**, **Nintendo**‡
  - Advance Wars 2: Black Hole Rising — Intelligent Systems, Nintendo
  - Fire Emblem — Intelligent Systems, Nintendo
  - Mario & Luigi: Superstar Saga — AlphaDream, Nintendo
  - Pokémon Ruby — Game Freak, Nintendo

=== Computer Awards ===
**Computer Action/Adventure Game of the Year**: **Prince of Persia: The Sands of Time** — **Ubisoft Montreal**‡; Grand Theft Auto: Vice City — Rockstar North; Max Payne 2: The Fall of Max Payne — Remedy Entertainment, Rockstar Games; The Lord of the Rings: The Return of the King — EA Redwood Shores; Uru: Ages Beyond Myst — Cyan Worlds, Ubisoft	**Computer Downloadable Game of the Year**: **Hamsterball** — **Raptisoft**, **Real.com**‡; Poppit! To Go — Pogo.com, Electronic Arts; Word Whomp To Go — Pogo.com, Electronic Arts; Zuma Deluxe — PopCap Games
**Computer Family Game of the Year**: **Zoo Tycoon: Complete Collection** — **Blue Fang Games**, **Microsoft Game Studios**‡	**Computer First-Person Action Game of the Year**: **Call of Duty** — **Infinity Ward**, **Activision**‡; Battlefield 1942: Secret Weapons of WWII — DICE, Electronic Arts; Tron 2.0 — Monolith Productions, Buena Vista Games
**Computer Role-Playing Game of the Year**: **Star Wars: Knights of the Old Republic** — **BioWare**, **LucasArts**‡; Deus Ex: Invisible War — Ion Storm, Eidos Interactive; Dungeon Siege: Legends of Aranna — Gas Powered Games, Mad Doc Software, Microsoft Game Studios; Neverwinter Nights: Shadows of Undrentide — BioWare, Floodgate Entertainment, Atari; The Temple of Elemental Evil — Troika Games, Atari	**Computer Simulation Game of the Year**: **The Sims: Superstar** — **Maxis**, **Electronic Arts**‡; Microsoft Flight Simulator 2004: A Century of Flight — Aces Game Studio, Microsoft Games Studios; IL-2 Sturmovik: Forgotten Battles — Maddox Games, Ubisoft; Trainz Railroad Simulator 2004 — Auran, Oteeva
**Computer Sports Game of the Year**: **Madden NFL 2004** — **EA Tiburon**‡; Championship Manager 4 — Sports Interactive, Eidos Interactive; Out of the Park 5 — .400 Software Studios; Tiger Woods PGA Tour 2004 — EA Redwood Shores, Headgate Studios	**Computer Strategy Game of the Year**: **Command & Conquer: Generals** — **EA Pacific**‡; Empires: Dawn of the Modern World — Stainless Steel Studios, Activision; Homeworld 2 — Relic Entertainment, Sierra Entertainment, Vivendi Universal Games; Praetorians — Pyro Studios, Eidos Interactive; Rise of Nations — Big Huge Games, Microsoft Game Studios

=== Online Awards ===
**Massive Multiplayer/Persistent World Game of the Year**
- **EverQuest: Lost Dungeons of Norrath** — **Sony Online Entertainment**‡
  - A Tale in the Desert — eGenesis, Desert Nomad Studios
  - Eve Online: Second Genesis — CCP Games, Simon & Schuster Interactive
  - Horizons: Empire of Istaria — Virtrium, Artifact Entertainment
  - Puzzle Pirates — Three Rings Design

=== Hall of Fame Award ===
- Peter Molyneux

=== Multiple nominations and awards ===
==== Multiple Nominations ====
Games that received multiple nominations
Nominations	Game
13	Prince of Persia: The Sands of Time
10	Star Wars: Knights of the Old Republic
9	The Legend of Zelda: The Wind Waker
7	Ratchet & Clank: Going Commando
6	Call of Duty
6	Jak II
6	SSX 3
5	Max Payne 2: The Fall of Max Payne
4	Beyond Good & Evil
4	Rise of Nations
3	Amplitude
3	Command & Conquer: Generals
3	Def Jam Vendetta
3	Final Fantasy X-2
3	Madden NFL 2004
3	The Lord of the Rings: The Return of the King
3	Tony Hawk's Underground
2	Deus Ex: Invisible War
2	EyeToy: Play
2	Grabbed by the Ghoulies
2	Soulcalibur II
2	Tiger Woods PGA Tour 2004
2	Tom Clancy's Rainbow Six 3: Raven Shield
2	Tron 2.0
2	True Crime: Streets of LA

Nominations by company
Nominations	Games	Company
33	17	Electronic Arts
23	7	Ubisoft
22	8	Sony Computer Entertainment
17	9	Nintendo
12	8	Microsoft Game Studios
12	4	Activision
11	2	BioWare
10	1	LucasArts
7	3	Rockstar Games
7	1	Insomniac Games
6	1	Infinity Ward
6	1	Naughty Dog
5	5	Atari
5	1	Remedy Entertainment
4	3	Eidos Interactive
4	2	SquareSoft
4	1	Big Huge Games
3	3	Sierra Entertainment
3	3	THQ
3	3	Vivendi Universal Games
3	2	Namco
3	1	AKI Corporation
3	1	Harmonix
3	1	Neversoft
2	2	Maxis
2	1	Buena Vista Games
2	1	Ion Storm
2	1	Luxoflux
2	1	Monolith Productions
2	1	Pogo.com
2	1	Project Soul
2	1	Rare
2	1	Red Storm Entertainment
2	1	Sega

==== Multiple awards ====
Games that received multiple awards
Awards	Game
8	Prince of Persia: The Sands of Time
3	Call of Duty
3	Star Wars: Knights of the Old Republic
2	EyeToy: Play
2	The Lord of the Rings: The Return of the King
2	Madden NFL 2004
2	SSX 3

Awards by company
Awards	Games	Company
12	9	Electronic Arts
9	2	Ubisoft
3	3	Nintendo
3	2	Sony Computer Entertainment
3	1	Activision
3	1	BioWare
3	1	Infinity Ward
3	1	LucasArts
2	2	Maxis
2	2	Microsoft Game Studios
2	2	SquareSoft
