= Hamsterball =

2004 video game

HamsterBall
- Icon for the PlayStation 3 version.
- Developers: TikGames LLC (PS3); Raptisoft (Windows)
- Publisher: GameHouse
- Composer: Peter Hajba
- Platforms: PlayStation 3 Windows
- Release: 8 February 2004 (Windows); 25 March 2010 (PS3)
- Genres: Racing puzzle action
- Modes: Single-player, multiplayer

Hamsterball, stylized as HamsterBall, is an indie video game developed by Raptisoft Games, released on 8 February 2004 for Microsoft Windows. A PlayStation 3 version, developed by TikGames LLC, was released on 25 March 2010.

== Gameplay ==
Similar to the arcade game Marble Madness, the goal is to complete a series of 15 race courses in as short a time as possible while avoiding various obstacles. Instead of a marble, however, the player controls a hamster in a clear plastic exercise ball. A short fall causes the hamster to become dizzy and hard to control for a short time. If the hamster falls too far, rolls off the course, or is destroyed by an obstacle, a new one is placed on the course after a short delay. A set amount of extra time is added to the player's clock at the beginning of each race; if time runs out, the game ends.

By following invisible paths on the courses, players can unlock appropriately themed multiplayer combat arenas. During this mode of play, "Rodent Rumble", the goal is to knock opponents' hamsters off the edge or into lethal obstacles as many times as possible within a time limit.

== Awards ==
During the 7th Annual Interactive Achievement Awards, the Academy of Interactive Arts & Sciences awarded Hamsterball with "Computer Downloadable Game of the Year".
