= Drake of the 99 Dragons =

2003 video game

- Developer: Idol FX
- Publisher: Majesco
- Directors: Marcus Thorell; Stefan Ljungqvist
- Producer: Johan Sjöberg
- Designer: Stefan Ljungqvist
- Programmers: Anders Åkerfeldts; Martin Eklund
- Artists: Stefan Ljungqvist; Marcus Thorell; Johan Egerkans; Alvaro Tapia
- Writer: Stefan Ljungqvist
- Composers: Johan Rask; Martin Eklund; Marcus Thorell; Tobias Andersson
- Platforms: Xbox; Windows
- Release: Xbox: NA: November 4, 2003; EU: March 26, 2004; Windows: EU: March 26, 2004; NA: June 14, 2004
- Genre: Third-person shooter
- Mode: Single-player

Drake of the 99 Dragons is a third-person shooter video game developed by Swedish studio Idol FX and published by Majesco. The game stars Drake, an undead assassin who is on a quest to avenge his murdered clan, the 99 Dragons, by recovering their ancient "Soul Portal Artifact" from antagonist Tang. Tang intends on using the artifact to harvest the souls of dead beings and power his undead cyborg army.

Upon release, Drake of the 99 Dragons received generally negative reviews. Contemporary reviewers have listed the game as one of the worst titles of 2003, and has since been widely considered as one of the worst video games of all time. The Windows version was re-released by the publisher on Steam in 2018.

== Gameplay ==
The player dual wields pistols to shoot enemies and restores health points by collecting Souls throughout levels.

Drake has a number of special moves, such as the abilities to double jump and to run up walls. He also has the ability to slow down time. Drake's health depends primarily on absorbing the souls of his fallen opponents, although there are also red "lost souls" which deplete Drake's health.

As a means of defense, Drake uses a wide arrangement of guns and firearms. The player is able to control two guns by using the left and right triggers. In the Xbox version, an aiming reticle (a common staple of third-person shooters) is excluded; instead, an auto-targeting feature is implemented to help Drake aim and fire at the player's enemies. In the PC version, however, an aiming reticle is used.

== Development ==
Drake of the 99 Dragons was created by Idol FX, a Stockholm-based development studio formed in 1999 by Stefan Ljungqvist, Johan Sjöberg and Marcus Thorell. The developers stated the design of the game was inspired by an imagined fusion between the work of Hong Kong film director John Woo and Batman: The Animated Series artist and animator Bruce Timm. Cel shading and reflection mapping techniques were combined in a method described by the developers as "rim light shading" to achieve a cartoonlike visual presentation.

Drake of the 99 Dragons (then titled simply Drake) was previewed to reviewers in March 2003, and announced and showcased by Majesco at E3 in May and San Diego Comic-Con in July. Andrew Bado, a quality assurance tester for the game, stated that beta testing began in June, although parts of the game were "obviously unfinished", with development ending in October. Pre-release reviews of Drake were generally positive. Sam Parker of GameSpot noted the game's "colorful" premise and expected the game to be "as over-the-top as it is stylish", with Brad Shoemaker praising a preview of the game for being "colorful, larger than life, and generally consistent with the comic book feel of the game", and "shaping up to be a pretty solid and stylish action game". Aaron Boulding of IGN praised the game's "spectacular looking" action scenes, comparing the "intuitive" use of time-slowing and wall running abilities to The Matrix. A comic book was developed as a tie-in with the release of the game.

On March 6, 2018, Majesco re-released the Windows version on Steam.

== Plot ==
Drake is the premier assassin of a Neo Macau-based clan known as the 99 Dragons. While training in the Kwoon, he hears a break in. He enters the chamber containing the Soul Portal Artifact, given to the clan over 3000 years ago, battling enemies before a mysterious Ghost Assassin swoops out of the room with the artifact. The assassin is in cahoots with Tang, a businessman and the clan's mortal enemy. Drake then pursues the assassin, but is unable to stop the villain when he phases out of a window of the penthouse. He returns to the Master's chamber, only to find the corpses of himself, the Master, and the other members of his clan.

Shocked, Drake collapses, and the tattoo on his chest glows. In a flashback, Drake is given the tattoo of the Undying Dragon by The Master, which provides him with supernatural powers as well as immortality. The tattoo glows, and Drake unleashes the abilities to run up walls, slow down time, and freeze time. He explores the penthouse and collects thirty souls of his fallen comrades and enemies. When the powers go to Drake's head, he leaps out a window and falls to his death. He then awakens in the Spirit Realm and is scolded by the four Spirit Gods. They inform him that he must collect more souls for the Undying Dragon and recover the Soul Portal Artifact in order to avenge his Master's death. They give him a new body and return him to the mortal realm. He pursues a courier and follows his blood trail to a fireworks factory. Drake shoots at him but is killed in a sudden explosion.

The gods, annoyed once more at Drake's lack of competence, bring him back to life and send him to the House of the Dreaming Cloud casino. There, Drake attempts to find the courier but is attacked by the casino's owner Pok and his demon dogs. After defeating Pok, Drake tails the courier to the Hung Fook Casino Palace, where it turns out he lost the Soul Portal Artifact in a gambling match. A thug beats Chun to near-death for his mishap, but Drake saves his life in time and learns the location of the Soul Portal Artifact. Drake quickly sets off through the city, fending off biker gangs along the way, and returns to the House of the Dreaming Cloud.

While fighting Pok, now in his "true" demonic form, Drake once again gets caught up in an explosion. Serpent-Eye Sung, a business partner and accomplice of Tang, steals the Soul Portal Artifact from a dying Drake and heads off to his canned seafood factory, where they are harvesting the soul from an albino orca. Drake goes to stop Serpent-Eye and take the Artifact back but is attacked by Tang's henchwoman Banshee and killed once more. The Spirit Gods decide to cut their losses and send Drake back to the penthouse, where the Tang Undertakers are stealing the corpses of the 99 Dragons. Drake chases after a truck holding his master's body and finds himself taken to a cyborg creation facility. There, he finds that Master has been turned into a cyborg, but manages to defeat the robot and retrieve his Master's body from the remains.

Outraged, Drake decides to go after Tang. Upon infiltrating Tang Towers, he discovers Tang's true scheme: to use the artifact to reap the souls from the Spirit Realm and use those souls to power his cyborg army. Drake then breaks into Tang's secret morgue facility and recaptures his clan members' souls. He then travels to the basements of the facility, where Tang is using the artifact to open the portal to the spirit realm. Drake fights and defeats a demon-like creature, but the Ghost Assassin steals the Soul Portal Artifact and escapes into the spirit realm. Drake enters the realm and pursues the assassin, ultimately defeating him. He then retrieves the Soul Portal Artifact and collects the Master's soul.

Drake then falls down to a nest of a three-headed beast called the Spirit Lord Supreme and defeats it. Drake then goes back to the Serene Garden and revives the Master with the artifact. Master thanks Drake for his efforts, stating that he achieved a level of proficiency even he was unable to reach, and he has proven himself to the Gods.

== Reception ==
Reception

Aggregate score
Aggregator	Score	
Aggregator	PC	Xbox
Metacritic	35/100	22/100

Review scores
Publication	Score	
Publication	PC	Xbox
Computer Games Magazine	N/A	F
Electronic Gaming Monthly	N/A	1.67/10
Game Informer	N/A	1.25/10
GameSpot	N/A	1.6/10
IGN	2.9/10	2.9/10
Official Xbox Magazine (US)	N/A	3/10
TeamXbox	N/A	2/10
X-Play	N/A	1/5

Drake of the 99 Dragons received "generally unfavorable reviews" on both platforms according to the review aggregation website Metacritic, with the score being the lowest for a game for the Xbox and one of the lowest of all time.

Reviewers unanimously critiqued the game's controls. Many critics found the game's auto-aim to be unworkable, with Electronic Gaming Monthly describing them as "outright broken" given players would be unable to accurately target with multiple foes present. Similarly, critics found the platforming controls difficult to handle. Aaron Boulding discussed the difficulties in "co-ordination between camera and character", leading to frequently falling off of buildings or walkways due to "fighting the camera". Abilities were also a source of frustration, with Alex Navarro of GameSpot stating that slowing or stopping time felt "pointless" and wall running and double jumping abilities "get in the way of trying to jump up to a ledge or higher floor".

Reviews of Drake were mixed on the game's visual presentation. Navarro described the game's graphics as "cheap", citing the "ugly" character and enemy animations, "drab" and "vacant" environments, and "off-kilter" lighting shaders. Boulding credited the developers for the novelty of the game's stylized, cel-shaded comic book aesthetic, although was unsure if the lack of detail was "to keep the framerate high or stay in line with the comic motif".

The plot of Drake was also subject to criticism. Navarro stated that the game's "disjointed" cutscenes, poor dialogue, and frequent introduction of characters with little context created an uninteresting story.

=== Retrospective reception ===
Drake of the 99 Dragons received a negative post-release reception. Several contemporary reviewers assessed the game as one of the worst of 2003, including Game Informer, critiquing its "awful name, horribly designed characters and revolting gameplay", and Alex Navarro of GameSpot listing it as the second most "frightfully bad" game of the year, noting its "horrible story" and "awful gameplay". Stating that Drake of the 99 Dragons "fails on every level", Adam Sessler and Morgan Webb for XPlay said the game "redefines the way we look at bad games" and had eclipsed Aquaman: Battle for Atlantis as the "standard by which all other bad games are measured".

Other critics have retrospectively described the game as one of the worst games for the Xbox or of all time. Charlie Barratt of GamesRadar+ stated the game "simply doesn't work" due to its "unoriginal" story, "incomprehensible" narration and "shoddy" controls". Also writing for GamesRadar+, Mikel Reparaz stated it was "widely regarded as the worst Xbox game ever made". Sam Stone of The Escapist critiqued the game's "unforgiving levels" and "absurdly difficult enemies".

Some critics re-evaluated the game following the 2018 re-release of the PC version, which featured some enhancements over the Xbox version. Writing for PC Gamer, Luke Winkie thought the game did not fully deserve its "ignoble reputation", finding it to be enjoyable although still a "bad game on PC" and not recommendable. Interviewed by Winkie about the game, GameSpot reviewer Alex Navarro reminisced that Drake represented a lost trend of mediocre budget titles released by major publishers. Dominic Tarason of Rock Paper Shotgun briefly noted the "surprise return" of the title to PC and the improvements to the game's controls.

== See also ==
- List of video games notable for negative reception
