= Tiger Woods PGA Tour 2004 =

2003 video game

- PlayStation 2 cover art
- Developers: EA Redwood Shores (Note: Ported to Windows by Headgate Studios.); Backbone Emeryville (GBA, NGE)
- Publisher: EA Sports
- Series: PGA Tour
- Platforms: GameCube, PlayStation 2, Windows, Xbox, Game Boy Advance, N-Gage
- Release: GameCube, PlayStation 2, Windows, Xbox: NA: September 22, 2003; AU: September 25, 2003; EU: September 26, 2003; Game Boy Advance: NA: November 4, 2003; EU: November 21, 2003; N-Gage: NA: June 24, 2004; EU: June 2004
- Genre: Sports
- Modes: Single-player, multiplayer

Tiger Woods PGA Tour 2004 is a sports video game developed by EA Redwood Shores for the GameCube, PlayStation 2 and Xbox versions, Headgate Studios for the Microsoft Windows version, and Backbone Emeryville for the Game Boy Advance and N-Gage versions, and published by EA Sports for GameCube, PlayStation 2, Windows, Xbox, Game Boy Advance and N-Gage.

== Reception ==
Reception

Aggregate score
Aggregator	Score				
Aggregator	GBA	GameCube	PC	PS2	Xbox
Metacritic	75/100	89/100	88/100	89/100	89/100

Review scores
Publication	Score				
Publication	GBA	GameCube	PC	PS2	Xbox
AllGame	N/A	4.5/5	N/A	4.5/5	N/A
Electronic Gaming Monthly	N/A	9.17/10	N/A	9.17/10	9.17/10
Eurogamer	N/A	N/A	N/A	8/10	N/A
Game Informer	N/A	9/10	N/A	9.5/10	9.25/10
GamePro	N/A	4.5/5	N/A	4.5/5	4.5/5
GameRevolution	N/A	A−	N/A	A−	A−
GameSpot	5.5/10	8.8/10	9.2/10	9.1/10	8.8/10
GameSpy	N/A	4.5/5	N/A	N/A	5/5
GameZone	N/A	9/10	9.2/10	9.2/10	9.2/10
IGN	8/10	9/10	9/10	9.1/10	9/10
Nintendo Power	3.5/5	4.9/5	N/A	N/A	N/A
Official U.S. PlayStation Magazine	N/A	N/A	N/A	5/5	N/A
Official Xbox Magazine (US)	N/A	N/A	N/A	N/A	9/10
PC Gamer (US)	N/A	N/A	89%	N/A	N/A
The Cincinnati Enquirer	N/A	4/5	4/5	4/5	4/5

Tiger Woods PGA Tour 2004 received "generally positive" reviews, according to review aggregator Metacritic. GameSpot named it the best PlayStation 2 game of September 2003.

Edge gave the GameCube, PS2, Xbox and PC versions a score of eight out of ten and stated: "This relaxed, arcade-like approach makes for something that's not so much about simulation, but more emulation; letting you thwack the ball with all the verve of an expert, without the worry of any homework. Fun, then, and lots of it." During the 7th Annual Interactive Achievement Awards, the Academy of Interactive Arts & Sciences nominated PGA Tour 2004 for "Console Sports Simulation Game of the Year" and "Computer Sports Game of the Year", both of which were ultimately awarded to Madden NFL 2004.

The game's PlayStation 2 version received a "Platinum" sales award from the Entertainment and Leisure Software Publishers Association (ELSPA), indicating sales of at least 300,000 copies in the United Kingdom. By July 2006, the PlayStation 2 version had sold 1 million copies and earned $43 million in the United States alone. Next Generation ranked it as the 51st highest-selling game launched for the PlayStation 2, Xbox or GameCube between January 2000 and July 2006 in that country. Combined sales of Tiger Woods PGA Tour games released in the 2000s reached 5 million units in the United States by July 2006.
