= Pride FC: Fighting Championships =

2003 video game

- Developer: Anchor Inc.
- Publishers: WW: THQ; JP: Capcom
- Composer: Pride FC music composed by Yasuharu Takanashi
- Platform: PlayStation 2
- Release: NA: February 11, 2003; JP: February 20, 2003; EU: April 25, 2003; AU: 2003
- Genres: Versus fighting, Sports
- Modes: Single-player, multiplayer

Pride FC: Fighting Championships, known in Japan as simply Pride (PRIDE(プライド), Puraido), is a video game in the fighting genre developed by Japanese studio Anchor Inc. based upon the Pride Fighting Championships. It was developed by Anchor Inc. and released by THQ and distributed in Japan by Capcom for the PlayStation 2 in 2003.

== Reception ==
Reception

Aggregate score
Aggregator	Score
Metacritic	73/100

Review scores
Publication	Score
Electronic Gaming Monthly	6/10
Famitsu	27/40
Game Informer	8/10
GamePro	3/5
GameRevolution	C−
GameSpot	8.1/10
GameSpy	4/5
GameZone	8/10
IGN	8/10
Official U.S. PlayStation Magazine	4/5

The game received slightly "above average" reviews according to the review aggregation website Metacritic. In Japan, Famitsu gave it a score of 27 out of 40.
