= Go! Go! Hypergrind =

2003 video game

- Developer: Poponchi
- Publisher: Atlus USA
- Director: Kazuma Nishiwaki
- Producers: Yoshinao Shimada; Kevin Kolde
- Designer: Tadayuki Konno
- Programmer: Tadashi Maki
- Artists: Masaki Shimizu; Eddie Fitzgerald; Gabe Swarr; Jim Smith
- Platform: GameCube
- Release: NA: November 18, 2003
- Genre: Sports
- Modes: Single-player, multiplayer

Go! Go! Hypergrind is a 2003 skateboarding video game developed by Poponchi and published by Atlus USA for the GameCube. It was released only in North America on November 18, 2003. Development was led by Poponchi, a small group of developers at Atlus, with animation studio Spümcø of The Ren & Stimpy Show fame serving as a collaborative art design firm for the game, with founder John Kricfalusi acting as an executive producer. Despite being developed in Japan, it was never released in the region.

== Plot ==
Spümcø is holding auditions in "Toon World" for a new skateboarding cartoon called Go! Go! Hypergrind. In the Story mode, the player chooses one of the cartoon star hopefuls and attempts to impress Spümcø and pass the audition.

== Gameplay ==
Go! Go! Hypergrind allows players to select one of several wacky cartoon characters and skateboard through a variety of cel-shaded levels. The objective of the game is to steer characters into a variety of classic cartoon "mishaps", usually involving inflicting pain on the character in some way, and then chaining one mishap directly into another to create combos.

There is also a versus mode offering five different game types, which can be played with two players or against the computer.

== Reception ==
Reception

Aggregate scores
Aggregator	Score
GameRankings	67.03%
Metacritic	67/100

Review scores
Publication	Score
Electronic Gaming Monthly	4.83/10
Game Informer	7.75/10
GameSpot	7.9/10
GameSpy	3/5
IGN	5.1/10
GMR	6/10
Play	B−

Go! Go! Hypergrind received "mixed or average" reviews, holding a rating of 67.03% based on eleven reviews according to review aggregators Metacritic and GameRankings.
