= Ninja Five-O =

2003 video game

- European cover art
- Developer: Hudson Soft
- Publisher: Konami
- Director: Gen Suzuki
- Producer: Hitoshi Kimoto
- Designer: Gen Suzuki
- Programmers: Hajime Hosokawa; Katsuhiko Hosogai; Yasukazu Majima
- Artist: Osamu Ōe
- Composers: Aya Tanaka; Hiroyuki Tsuboguchi
- Platform: Game Boy Advance
- Release: EU: April 11, 2003; NA: April 17, 2003
- Genres: Action, platform
- Mode: Single-player

Ninja Five-O, known in the PAL region as Ninja Cop, is a 2003 action-platform video game developed by Hudson Soft and published by Konami. It was released for the Game Boy Advance in North America and Europe in April 2003. Players take the role of Joe Osugi, a ninja who must stop a terrorist group influenced by mystical masks. It was first announced at "Konami Gamers' Day" in early 2003.

The game received generally positive reviews from video game critics, but it failed to garner sales and is often regarded as one of the most sought-after handheld games.

The original version was re-released on February 25, 2025, for Windows, Nintendo Switch, PlayStation 4 and PlayStation 5.

== Gameplay ==
Ninja Five-O is an action game centered around Joe Osugi, a ninja tasked with stopping a terrorist group influenced by the Mad Masks, masks that give the wearer obscene power. As Osugi, the player must defeat the terrorists and rescue hostages through five missions with three levels and a boss battle.

== Development ==
The game was developed by Hudson Soft. Ninja Five-O was first announced in January 2003 during "Konami Gamers' Day", where they announced along with fifteen other games they would publish in 2003.

Despite being developed and published by Japanese video game companies, it was never released in Japan for reasons unknown. The US box art was illustrated by Julie Giles, who designed other Konami packaging such as the Castlevania and Metal Gear franchises.

Ninja Five-O was released in North America and Europe in April 2003.

In February 2024, it was announced that Limited Run Games will develop a version in cooperation with Konami for the Nintendo Switch, PlayStation 4, and PlayStation 5.

== Reception ==
Reception

Aggregate score
Aggregator	Score
Metacritic	82/100

Review scores
Publication	Score
Game Informer	8.25/10
GamePro	4/5
GameSpot	7.9/10
GameSpy	4/5
GameZone	8.5/10
IGN	8.5/10
Nintendo Power	4/5
Nintendo World Report	9/10
The Cincinnati Enquirer	4/4

Upon release of the game, Ninja Five-O received "favorable" reviews according to the review aggregation website Metacritic. It was chosen as runner-up for "GBA Game of the Month" by IGN for the month of April 2003, behind Golden Sun: The Lost Age.

In a retrospective review from Nintendo Life, Perry Wild praised its level design for having a balance between the platforming and combat aspects in the game.

Ninja Five-O received awards and nominations from several gaming publications. GameSpy named it the third best Game Boy Advance game of 2003, as well as the Best Platform Game for the system. It was also chosen as the "Best Game No One Played" by IGN. IGN later listed it at number 23 in their list of the top 25 Game Boy Advance games of all time. In 2008, CraveOnline featured the game among top 10 Ninja games of all time, calling it "weird, fun, challenging, and a great homage to another awesome ninja game from the 8-bit era, Shadow of the Ninja". According to GameFan, "Ninja Five-O was one of the biggest sleeper hits of 2003. Given lackluster sales it's unlikely to spawn a sequel, but with everything it got right the first time one can only imagine what might have been."

Ninja Five-O is now seen as one of the most sought-after games for the Game Boy Advance, with IGN listing it as "Extremely Rare". By 2013, Pocket Gamer listed it as one of the most expensive handheld games, noting that a copy of the game was being sold on eBay for £70 while a boxed copy went for £200.
