= Celebrity Deathmatch (video game) =

2003 video game

- Developers: Big Ape Productions; Coresoft (PS)
- Publisher: Gotham Games
- Platforms: Microsoft Windows, PlayStation, PlayStation 2, Xbox
- Release: NA: October 14, 2003; NA: October 21, 2003 (PS); EU: October 31, 2003
- Genre: Sports
- Modes: Single-player, multiplayer

Celebrity Deathmatch is a professional wrestling video game by American studio Big Ape Productions, based on the MTV series of the same name. It is available for PlayStation, as well as Microsoft Windows, PlayStation 2 and Xbox. The game features celebrities and movie monsters as playable characters.

== Gameplay ==
In the game, the player needs to hit their opponent several times until the opponent's life meter flashes red, at which point text will show the word Kill!. The winning player then needs to fill up the MTV meter to full. In order to make the happen faster, players can taunt the audience. When in the proper momentum, the player can finish the opponent off by performing their special moves.

Within the match, several boxes containing various power-ups and weapons can be picked up by the players.

=== Playable characters ===
The following are starter characters on the roster:

- Anna Nicole Smith
- Busta Rhymes
- Carmen Electra
- Carrot Top
- Cindy Margolis
- Dennis Rodman
- Jerry Springer
- Marilyn Manson
- Mr. T
- Miss Cleo
- Ron Jeremy
- Shannen Doherty
- Singers of NSYNC
  - Chris Kirkpatrick
  - JC Chasez
  - Joey Fatone
  - Justin Timberlake
  - Lance Bass
- Tommy Lee

The following are unlockable characters on the roster:

- Cousin Grimm
- Frankenstein's monster
- Gladiator Nick Diamond
- Mummy
- Wizard Johnny Gomez
- Wolfman
- Zatar the Alien

== Development ==
Celebrity Deathmatch was originally scheduled to be available for the GameCube as well. However shortly prior to release, its publisher Gotham Games quietly cancelled this version. A source close to development cited "programming issues" as the reason behind the decision.

== Reception ==
Reception

Aggregate scores
Aggregator	Score			
Aggregator	PC	PS	PS2	Xbox
GameRankings	27%	20%	37%	36%
Metacritic	30/100	N/A	32/100	36/100

Review scores
Publication	Score			
Publication	PC	PS	PS2	Xbox
1Up.com	N/A	N/A	F	F
Computer Gaming World	1/5	N/A	N/A	N/A
Game Informer	N/A	N/A	2.75/10	2.75/10
GameRevolution	N/A	N/A	D−	D−
GameSpot	2.8/10	N/A	2.8/10	2.8/10
GameSpy	N/A	N/A	1/5	1/5
GameZone	4.5/10	N/A	5.5/10	5.7/10
IGN	5/10	N/A	4/10	5/10
Official U.S. PlayStation Magazine	N/A	1/5	1.5/5	N/A
Official Xbox Magazine (US)	N/A	N/A	N/A	3/10
PC Gamer (US)	17%	N/A	N/A	N/A

The PC, PlayStation 2 and Xbox versions received "unfavorable" reviews according to the review aggregation website Metacritic.

In his review for GameSpot, Alex Navarro called the gameplay "absolutely horrid" and criticised the "complete lack of any worthwhile features". He also was critical of the lack of different modes. In a scathing review of the PS2 version, GameSpy's Matthew Freeman said that the game "dies a faltering and unfunny death" adding that the fighting system was "unresponsive, illogical, and incredibly easy anyway". He also complained about the AI that he called "idiotic, unfocused, and hapless."

Tom Edwards for Computer Gaming World, reviewing the PC version, opined that the game would have been more bearable if the included celebrities were characters "for whom you have actual dislike rather than disinterest".
