= The Lord of the Rings: The Return of the King (video game) =

2003 video game

- Developers: EA Redwood Shores; Hypnos Entertainment (GC, PS2, Xbox); Griptonite Games (GBA); ImaginEngine (mobile); Beenox (Mac OS X)
- Publishers: EA Games; JAMDAT (mobile); Aspyr (Mac OS X)
- Producers: Todd Arnold; Steve Gray; Arcadia Kim; Glen Schofield
- Designers: Bret Robbins; Chris Tremmel
- Programmers: Marc David; Eric Metens; Dom Regan; Scott DeFreitas; Scott Randolph
- Artists: Margaret Foley-Mauvais; Christian Lorenz Scheurer
- Writer: Michael Becker
- Composer: Howard Shore
- Platforms: Microsoft Windows, PlayStation 2, Game Boy Advance, GameCube, Xbox, Mobile, Mac OS X
- Release: Game Boy Advance, GameCube, Microsoft Windows, PlayStation 2, Xbox: NA: 6 November 2003; EU: 14 November 2003; Mobile: NA: 1 December 2003; Mac OS X: NA: 30 March 2004
- Genre: Hack and slash
- Modes: Single-player, multiplayer

The Lord of the Rings: The Return of the King is a 2003 hack and slash game developed by EA Redwood Shores for the PlayStation 2 and Windows. It was ported to the GameCube and Xbox by Hypnos Entertainment, to the Game Boy Advance by Griptonite Games, to mobile by ImaginEngine, and to Mac OS X by Beenox. The game was published by Electronic Arts. It is the sequel to the 2002 game The Lord of the Rings: The Two Towers.

The game is an adaptation of Peter Jackson's 2002 film The Lord of the Rings: The Two Towers and his 2003 film The Lord of the Rings: The Return of the King, which was released shortly after the game. As it is not an adaptation of J. R. R. Tolkien's 1954 novel, The Return of the King, the third volume in Lord of the Rings, anything from the novel not specifically mentioned or depicted in the films could not be represented in the game. This is because, at the time, Vivendi Universal Games, in partnership with Tolkien Enterprises, held the rights to the video game adaptations of Tolkien's literary works, whilst Electronic Arts held the rights to the video game adaptations of the New Line Cinema films.

The game is similar to its predecessor in basic gameplay, but differs by adding multiple storylines, more playable characters and increased interaction with environments. A two-player co-op mode is also available for some missions. As with The Two Towers, The Return of the King was developed in close collaboration with the filmmakers, using many of the actual reference photos, drawings, models, props and other assets from the film. The game was met with positive critical reception for its graphics, audio, and gameplay, although its camera positioning and short length were criticized.

== Gameplay ==
Described by the developers as a modern version of Gauntlet, The Return of the King is a hack and slash action game played from a third-person perspective. The game is very similar to its predecessor in basic gameplay. Each character has a quick attack which does minimal damage and can be easily blocked, and a fierce attack, which does more damage, but is slower and leaves the player vulnerable to attack. Only fierce attacks can break enemy shields. Each character also has a ranged attack, a "killing move" (which can be used to instantly kill downed enemies), a parry (which can deflect enemy attacks), a knock back (which pushes nearby enemies away), a jump back (in which the player character jumps back away from the enemy), a devastating attack (a charged fierce attack) and a special ability. Playable characters in the console and PC versions are Gandalf, Aragorn, Legolas, Gimli, Frodo and Sam, with Faramir, Pippin and Merry available as unlockable characters. Playable characters in the GBA version are Legolas, Gimli, Frodo, Gandalf, and Éowyn.

Each playable character has their own set of combos and attributes. After the end of each level the player can upgrade their characters' abilities and combos using experience points. The number of points available to the player depends on the efficiency of their kills. During each level, the player will be continually graded on the skill with which they dispatch enemies; "Fair", "Good", "Excellent" and "Perfect." The more skill with which the player kills, the more experience they acquire. The player's skill is measured by an on-screen meter which increases as the player dispatches enemies. To avoid the meter dropping back down, the player must avoid being hit, and kill enemies using a variety of different methods. When a player reaches a Perfect level, all of their attacks increase in strength, and the experience from each kill is doubled. However, Perfect status only lasts for a brief period of time. A new aspect of Return of the King is that at the end of each level, rather than purchasing upgrades for the individual character, the player can also purchase "Fellowship" upgrades which apply to every playable character. However, characters will only be able to avail of a particular skill when they have reached the corresponding experience level.

A major change from The Two Towers is the interactive nature of the game environments. The player can operate machinery, for example bridges and catapults, to complete objectives, and use environmental objects as weapons, such as spears and cauldrons, to kill enemies. The levels are also twice the size of the largest level from The Two Towers and many are less linear. Unlike The Two Towers, The Return of the King features a co-op mode, allowing two players to play through the game together. The North American PlayStation 2 version also has an online multiplayer mode, with USB headset support, although this was removed from the European version of the game.

The Game Boy Advance version is played from an isometric three-quarter top-down view. A major gameplay difference in this version is the addition of "runes" which players can etch into their weapons, granting them special abilities. The game also features co-op multiplayer through the Game Boy link function, and unlockable content when connected to the GameCube version via the GameCube – Game Boy Advance link cable.

== Plot ==
Todd Arnold, senior producer of The Return of the King, stated that the game was not intended to re-tell the story of the film, but to allow the player to come as close as possible to experiencing the critical parts of the film for themselves. Levels were designed with this goal in mind, with just enough plot to give context to the player's actions. Liberties were thus taken with the plot, and critics noted there was little footage which could spoil the film for those who had not seen it. GameSpot's Greg Kasavin said "if you didn't know anything about the story of The Return of the King, then the story of the game may be hard to follow, though you'll still get the gist of it." However, he also advised, "in case you don't want any aspect of the movie spoiled for you, it'd be wise to hold off on playing The Return of the King until after you've seen the movie."

=== Synopsis ===
The game begins during the Battle of the Hornburg at Helm's Deep, with the Uruk-hai having just penetrated the outer walls. With the defenders falling back to the inner court, Gandalf (voiced by Ian McKellen) appears on a hill-top flanked by thousands of Rohirrim. The player takes control of Gandalf as he enters the battle and helps defeat the Uruk-hai and orc army. After this level, the game splits into three separate mission arcs, each with its own individual set of characters. The "Path of the Wizard" follows Gandalf, the "Path of the King" follows Aragorn (Chris Edgerly), Legolas (Andrew Chaikin) and Gimli (John Rhys-Davies), and the "Path of the Hobbits" follows Frodo (Elijah Wood) and Sam (Sean Astin), although initially only Sam is playable.

Screenshot showing Sam delivering a killing blow to an Orc on a bridge. In the top-right of the screen is a counter related to the level's objective of preventing Frodo from being captured by the Nazgûl. In the bottom-left, the player's health, experience points, ranged weapon ammunition and the quality of their kill are displayed.

The Path of the Wizard continues immediately after the events of the first level. The remains of the Uruk-hai and orc army flee into Fangorn Forest. However, within the forest, the Ents, led by Treebeard, have awoken and joined the fight against Sauron. Gandalf helps the ents as they destroy the rest of the army, and then assists them in bringing down a dam holding back the River Isen. This floods Isengard, trapping Saruman (Christopher Lee), who had joined forces with Sauron, in his tower, Orthanc. Gandalf and Pippin (Billy Boyd) then head to Minas Tirith, capital of Gondor, leaving Aragorn, Legolas, Gimli and the Rohirrim to follow them. Gandalf has gone ahead of the others because Sauron mistakenly believes that Pippin has the Ring, and Gandalf plans to use this confusion to distract Sauron as Frodo and Sam are led by Gollum (Andy Serkis) towards Mount Doom to destroy the Ring. In Minas Tirith, Gandalf helps repulse the enemies from the walls for a time, but eventually, they break through the city's defenses. Gandalf and the soldiers of Minas Tirith then retreat to a courtyard, where they must defend the fleeing civilians from the enemy. Once the people are safely inside, Gandalf can do little but await the arrival of Aragorn.

The Path of the King picks up with Aragorn, Legolas, Gimli and the Rohirrim on the way to Minas Tirith. Before arriving, however, the three companions must walk the Paths of the Dead in an effort to convince the Army of the Dead to join their cause in the War of the Ring. To do so, they must defeat the King of the Dead (Jarion Monroe) in combat. After this, the Paths of the Dead start to collapse, and they must escape before the falling rubble crushes them. With the Army of the Dead pledged to aid them, they travel to Minas Tirith and enter the Battle of the Pelennor Fields. Joining the Rohirrim and the soldiers of Minas Tirith, they face orcs, Easterlings, Haradrim and oliphaunts. They must also defend Merry (Dominic Monaghan) and Éowyn (Lorri Holt), allowing Éowyn the opportunity to defeat the Witch-king of Angmar. As it seems they are about to be overwhelmed, the Army of Dead arrive, destroying the forces of Mordor and saving Minas Tirith.

The Path of the Wizard and Path of the King share the same final level, set at the Black Gate of Mordor. In a further effort to distract Sauron from the approach of Frodo and Sam, Gandalf advises that Aragorn and the remaining army marches to the Gates of Mordor as a direct challenge to Sauron, who will send out a vast army to meet them, thus keeping his attention away from Mount Doom. Upon arriving at the Gate, the party are confronted by the Mouth of Sauron (Roger L. Jackson), who tells them that Frodo is dead. They kill him and must then face a massive army of orcs, before fighting the remaining Nazgûl. Not believing Frodo to be dead, they plan to fight as long as they can, so as to give Frodo enough time to destroy the Ring.

In The Path of the Hobbits, Frodo, Sam and Gollum must first escape from Osgiliath, fighting past orcs to get to the sewers and ensuring that Frodo is not kidnapped by the Nazgûl. However, upon escaping, Gollum decides to betray them and take the Ring back for himself. He tricks Frodo into going on without Sam, but Sam follows them into Shelob's lair. In the lair, Gollum abandons Frodo, and Sam must fight past giant spiders and orcs, eventually facing Shelob herself, who has attacked Frodo. Sam defeats Shelob, but upon reaching Frodo, he mistakenly believes him to be dead. About to go to Mount Doom on his own, he hides as a group of orcs arrive and hears them say that Frodo is alive but unconscious. They take him with them as Sam follows them to the Tower of Cirith Ungol. As Sam is about to enter the Tower, the orcs begin fighting among themselves, and Sam uses the distraction to rescue Frodo. Together, they head to Mount Doom. However, before Frodo can throw the Ring into the lava below, he is attacked by Gollum, who takes the Ring. In the final level, the player controls Frodo as he fights Gollum on the edge of the precipice. Frodo successfully defeats Gollum, knocking him into the lava and destroying the Ring forever.

== Development ==
Following the success of the video game tie-in of The Two Towers film, an adaptation of The Return of the King was announced on 25 April 2003. While The Two Towers was released on the three major consoles (PlayStation 2, GameCube and Xbox) and the Game Boy Advance, The Return of the King was also set for release on PC. Executive producer Neil Young revealed playable characters would include Gandalf, Aragorn, Legolas, Gimli, Frodo, Sam and two to four unlockable characters. He also stated the characters' fighting styles would be much more differentiated from one another than they had been in Two Towers, and he explained the game would offer three separate story branches rather than one, but the player would be unable to complete the game or get to the final level by playing through only one branch. Young stated "there are certain gates that prevent the player from progressing that might break the fiction, but that motivates them to essentially bring a party of characters through the game to its conclusion." The development team originally had been working on a new game engine from scratch for The Return of the King. With progress stalling about a year into development, the team turned to the engine used for EA Sports' Tiger Woods PGA Tour series, which was similarly built to craft expansive areas with large structures located throughout the world, and used it as a foundation for the engine built for The Return of the King.

EA debuted the game at the 2003 E3 event in May, announcing that compared to Two Towers, Return of the King had more playable characters, larger and less linear levels, multiple narrative paths, bigger and more intelligent bosses, interactive environments, and a co-op mode. Footage from the films and parts of Howard Shore's score would feature, and members of the film's cast would lend their voices and likenesses to the game. On 15 May, a playable demo was made available for the PS2, featuring the first Minas Tirith level along with a non-playable demo of the co-op gameplay in a customized level specifically designed for E3. EA also revealed they were working on having Gollum as a playable character, although this ultimately did not happen, except in the GBA version.

The developers called The Return of the King "bigger and better" than The Two Towers. "In The Two Towers the player would occasionally run into 10 or 15 enemies," said lead game designer Chris Tremmel, "in The Return of the King there are areas where the player faces up to 40 orcs [...] Fans familiar with The Two Towers will find that the combat experience in The Return of the King feels familiar but much deeper." Before creating levels, the developers would initially look at the script and determine what parts from the film to highlight in that particular level, and how to structure that event as a mission. They would then write in-depth level designs out on paper, going into details such as combat setup, special props and enemy types, all the while using the film as their main reference point. They would then create an animatic of the level, working out problems and fine-tuning design concepts. The levels would then be created in the game environment. The game is also graphically improved over The Two Towers. According to Neil Young, "we've developed some new lighting techniques to allow the characters to look richer. We are pushing 2x the number of polys & 2x the texture density [...] we also stream our geometry and textures from the disc so the game has a much higher density of imagery." Enemy AI was improved, and developers also spent a lot of time working on the sound of the game, which was THX certified.

Above: a scene from The Return of the King film. Below: the same scene in the video game.

Producer Glen Schofield stated the biggest challenge the developers were facing was "just trying to match the breathtaking look and feel of the movies". Similarly, Neil Young said "We wanted to make something that's authentic and true to the movie. The people on our team really care about making a game that aspires to more than just a sequel, they want to make this equivalent to the movie experience itself." EA Redwood Shores worked closely with New Line Cinema to make the games as authentic as possible, using the actual reference photos, drawings, models, props, lighting studies and motion capture data. EA's partner relations director, Nina Dobner said:

Both New Line and the film production company in New Zealand are integrally tied into the entire development process of the game. Right from the conceptual stage down to the final production builds, their input is sought and listened to. We don't consider New Line a licensor, but more a true partner. As soon as we have the earliest storyboards and bare bones outline for a game, New Line are right at the table with me, giving their feedback. This is also the stage at which we introduce Peter Jackson, Barrie Osborne and the rest of the film production team to the key concepts and get their feedback. From here on, I meet with the actors, the film-makers and New Line on a regular basis to elicit feedback and new ideas as we move forward with the development. We are so deeply tied into the film production that we actually opened our own offices within the 3 foot 6 Weta offices in New Zealand during the pick-up shooting so we could be closer to the action and the assets.

Dobner said that during the development of the game, she traveled to New Zealand once a month with builds of the game for the filmmakers to play, and on which to give their feedback, and that in total, EA had acquired a quarter of a million different assets from the production. Schofield further pointed out "we even hired the same stunt doubles from the movie to help us render the most realistic movements in the game." Dobner also said "we want the game to not just look like the films but to be exactly like the films." She commented that no details in the game were made up; "when we were reproducing Minas Tirith [...] we felt the team would benefit from being able to see and feel a piece of the actual movie set. Unfortunately, the set had already been dismantled. So, while in New Zealand, I searched the various warehouses to find remnants of the dismantled set. After much work, I returned to San Francisco proudly bearing four bricks from the Minas Tirith set."

== Reception ==
Reception

Aggregate score
Aggregator	Score				
Aggregator	GBA	GameCube	PC	PS2	Xbox
Metacritic	77/100	84/100	78/100	85/100	84/100

Review scores
Publication	Score				
Publication	GBA	GameCube	PC	PS2	Xbox
Electronic Gaming Monthly	6.83/10			8.33/10	
Eurogamer				7/10	
Game Informer	8/10	8.25/10		8.25/10	8.25/10
GameSpot	7.5/10	8/10	8/10	8/10	8/10
GameSpy	3/5	4.5/5	4/5	4.5/5	5/5
GameZone	8.3/10	9/10	7.7/10	9.1/10	9/10
IGN	8/10	8.7/10	8.7/10	8.9/10	8.7/10
Nintendo Power	4.1/5	4.5/5			
Official U.S. PlayStation Magazine				5/5	
Official Xbox Magazine (US)					8.1/10
PC Gamer (UK)			85%		
PC Gamer (US)			58%		

Awards
Publication	Award
IGN	Wireless Game of the Year (2003)
Interactive Achievement; Awards (2004)	Outstanding Achievement in Sound Design
Interactive Achievement; Awards (2004)	Outstanding Achievement in Character Performance - Male (Elijah Wood as Frodo Baggins)

The Return of the King received "generally favorable" reviews across all systems; the Game Boy Advance version holds an aggregate score of 77 out of 100 on Metacritic, based on 13 reviews; the GameCube version 84 out of 100, based on 23 reviews; the PC version 78 out of 100, based on 18 reviews; the PlayStation 2 version 85 out of 100, based on 31 reviews; and the Xbox version 84 out of 100, based on 31 reviews.

As an adaptation, the game was praised by GameZone's Michael Knutson as "the best movie to game conversion that has come out in a long time" and by GameSpy's Raymond Padilla as setting "a new standard for video game adaptations of movies."

The graphics and THX-certified audio were lauded by critics. The game's animations, scenery, player models, cutscenes, music and voice acting were particularly well received. "Sound effects used in the game will also blow you away," Knutson said, "Everything from the explosions, swords clashing, hundreds of incoming enemies storming your way, all sounds like it came directly from the movie!" GameSpot's Greg Kasavin noted that "Frame rate issues do affect each version of the game, to varying degrees, and none of the character models for the main characters look all that remarkable," but conceded that "all other aspects of The Return of the King's graphics are outstanding [...] The game's audio is even more effective than the graphics at conveying the intensity of the action." Ian McKellen's narration of the game as Gandalf was also praised by GameSpot and Game Informer.

The game's combat was praised by most critics. Electronic Gaming Monthly's Crispin Boyer described the game as "a thrill ride. And not just 'cause Return of the King unleashes larger hordes of foes than last year's equally slick Two Towers prequel. Many of Return of the King's levels actually force you to multitask while you hack and slash." PC Gamer UK's Tony Ellis wrote "combat in RotK is superbly satisfying. Your blows connect with a solid, visceral thud you can almost feel." He also noted the variation between levels. Eurogamer's Kristan Reed praised the "subtleties of the combat." In contrast, Game Informer's Matthew Kato found the gameplay to be "repetitious", writing "sometimes I got the feeling that I was working harder only to have less fun than in Two Towers." The co-op mode was also praised.

The Return of the King was criticized for its poor camera placement. "What's the use of a new graphics engine and character models when the view is from so far away?" asked Kato. Reed complained about "camera switches which reverse the controls, or worse, completely obscure your viewpoint. On just about every mission the camera switching confuses the hell out of you." The game's save function was also criticized. Ellis commented that "You can only save after completing a level [...] which is not so good when you're forced to slog through the same sequences over and over again." Critics also complained about the unskippable cut scenes, occasionally unclear objectives and relatively short length.

The GBA version also received good reviews. GameZone's Steve Hopper found it very similar to the GBA version of Two Towers, but wrote "all in all this is solid action game that I can wholeheartedly recommend for gamers who loved The Two Towers and want more of the same brand of hack and slash action." IGN's Craig Harris wrote "the enhancements to the gameplay definitely enhance an already solid action game, and it's also a very recommended two player experience as well. The Return of the King is a nice compliment to a great film, and a decent follow-up to an already enjoyable action title on the handheld." GameSpot's Frank Provo called it "more satisfying and ultimately more playable" than Two Towers, and praised the differentiation between the characters, the graphics and the experience system. GameSpy's Matt Chandronait was less impressed, criticizing the game's "technical flaws," especially its collision detection. He called it a "repetitive beat-'em-up that require[s] dozens of hours of devotion to unlock every last item, level, and character."

=== Sales and awards ===
In the United States, the Windows version of The Return of the King sold 240,000 copies and earned $5.5 million by August 2006, after its release in November 2003. It was the country's 86th best-selling computer game during this period. In the United Kingdom, the PlayStation 2 version received a "Platinum" sales award from the Entertainment and Leisure Software Publishers Association (ELSPA), indicating sales of at least 300,000 copies.

The wireless version of Return of the King, developed by JAMDAT, won IGN's "Wireless Game of the Year" award for 2003. At the 2003 Spike Video Game Awards, Return of the King was nominated for two awards; "Best Animation" and "Best Game Based on a Movie". It lost in both categories, to Dead or Alive Xtreme Beach Volleyball and Enter the Matrix, respectively. During the 7th Annual Interactive Achievement Awards, the Academy of Interactive Arts & Sciences awarded the game in two categories: "Outstanding Achievement in Character Performance - Male" (for Elijah Wood's voice role as Frodo) and "Outstanding Achievement in Sound Design"; it also received a nomination for "Computer Action/Adventure Game of the Year". In 2014, IGN included the game in their list of the "5 Best Lord of the Rings Video Games."

=== Peter Jackson reaction ===
Despite the game's receiving general critical acclaim and selling well, Peter Jackson, director of the Lord of the Rings film trilogy, stated that the video game tie-in for his next film, King Kong, would not be developed by EA, but by Ubisoft. Jackson's manager claimed that despite EA saying the filmmakers were heavily involved in the making of the game, the developers were not interested in Jackson's input on the game. Additionally, Jackson had played Beyond Good & Evil, and wanted to work with producer Michel Ancel, who was at Ubisoft.
