= Ozzy & Drix (video game) =

2003 video game

- Developer: Raylight Studios
- Publisher: Midway Games
- Director: Fausto Cardone
- Producers: Massimiliano Di Monda; Nathan Rose; Jason Ades
- Programmer: Fausto Cardone
- Artist: Raffaele Grande
- Writer: Leonard Dean Uhley
- Composer: Vanni Miele
- Platform: Game Boy Advance
- Release: December 2003
- Genre: Platformer
- Mode: Single-player

Ozzy & Drix is a 2003 video game developed by Raylight Studios and published by Midway Games for the Game Boy Advance (GBA). Based on the animated television series of the same name, the game follows the characters Ozzy and Drix, who must rescue their city's kidnapped mayor. While the game is primarily a side-scrolling platformer, driving and first-person shooter levels are also included. The game was poorly received by critics, who highlighted significant flaws in gameplay, controls, and level design, despite some praise for its 3D graphics.

== Gameplay ==
An example of platforming gameplay from Ozzy & Drix.

Ozzy & Drix is primarily a side-scrolling platformer that includes driving and first-person shooter levels, set within a human body belonging to a 13-year-old boy, Hector Cruz. The player alternatively controls the white blood cell Osmosis "Ozzy" Jones and cold pill Drixobenzometaphedramine ("Drix"), who must navigate through levels with the objective of rescuing Mayor Spryman from the villainous Strepfinger. Players can run, jump, and double-jump across platforms to traverse levels, with combat involving shooting enemies with a pistol. The driving sequences take place on nervous system pathways, where players dodge traffic and mines laid by enemies. Some levels shift to a first-person perspective for shooting gameplay, and each level ends with a boss battle.

== Plot ==
Ozzy and Drix work to protect the city of Hector, a personified human body. A coalition of pathogens, led by the criminal mastermind Strepfinger, have united to take over Hector's body after having failed individually. Ozzy and Drix are summoned by Mayor Spryman to City Hall, where they discover zombified cops under Nick O'Teen's influence. After defeating him, they learn Spryman is being held captive and must follow Strepfinger's clues to find him. The clues lead them through the stomach, where they battle the intestinal worm Trickynosis; the nervous system, where they avoid Pb's lead soldiers; and the mouth, where they confront General Malaise. Ozzy confronts Strepfinger and his Bacteria Gang in Hector's nose. Ozzy defeats Strepfinger, rescuing Spryman just as Hector sneezes, expelling Strepfinger. Despite Ozzy and Drix's heroics, Spryman takes credit for the victory, much to Ozzy's frustration.

== Development and release ==
Ozzy & Drix, based on the animated television series of the same name, was developed by game studio Raylight Studios and published by Midway Games, with Raylight's Massimiliano Di Monda, Midway's Nathan Rose, and Warner Bros. Interactive Entertainment's Jason Ades serving as producers. Fausto Cardone was the game's director of development and lead programmer, whilst Raffaele Grande served as the game's artist. The audio was created by Vanni Miele and the story and dialogue were written by Leonard Dean Uhley of Warner Bros. The game was showcased at E3 2003, and was released in North America in December 2003.

== Reception ==
Reception

Aggregate score
| Aggregator | Score |
|---|---|
| Metacritic | 36/100 |

Review scores
| Publication | Score |
|---|---|
| GameSpot | 3.5/10 |
| GameZone | 7/10 |
| IGN | 3.5/10 |
| Nintendo Power | 11.5/25 |
| Pocket Games | 2/10 |

Ozzy & Drix received "generally negative" reviews according to Metacritic. The game was seen as a disappointing and frustrating failure to live up to its promising concept and technical achievements, with Craig Harris of IGN labeling it "really, really bad". Michael Lafferty of GameZone was more lenient, calling it a solid but average game worth checking out for its variety.

The 3D graphics were regarded as the game's strongest aspect, with most reviewers praising the vibrant, cartoon-inspired environments and the technical achievement of Raylight Studios' Blue Roses engine on the GBA. The visuals were said to create a convincing 3D world with dynamic camera angles and animated characters. The reviewers of Nintendo Power dissented, calling the graphics poorly rendered, and Marc Camron of Pocket Games noted fuzzy characters and generically-designed enemies, though he acknowledged some appealing 3D graphics.

The gameplay was widely criticized as simplistic, frustrating, and poorly designed. Lafferty noted the game's accessibility but lack of innovation. Harris and GameSpot's Frank Provo emphasized the dull level design and sluggish controls, while Nintendo Power and Camron underscored the frustration caused by poor collision detection and imprecise platforming, which requires the player to make jumps without seeing their intended landing spot.

The controls were consistently criticized as unresponsive and sluggish, particularly for the platforming and jumping mechanics. Provo and Harris noted the double jump and shooting mechanics as especially problematic, with delays and inconsistent collision detection being sources of frustration. Lafferty was less harsh, describing the controls as simplified and easy to learn.

The level design was a significant point of criticism, with reviewers noting repetitive, poorly planned levels and excessive blind jumps due to the fixed camera. Provo and Harris particularly emphasized the frustration of the fixed camera keeping platforms out of sight, requiring several blind jumps, and Provo described the driving levels as an underdeveloped afterthought. Camron noted unclear objectives, describing an instance of missing an item needed to exit a level. Lafferty was more neutral, appreciating the variety of level types but not their execution.

The audio was generally found to be underwhelming. Lafferty described a decent but repetitive musical score and tinny effects. Harris noted repetitive music and decent digitized samples but no voice acting, and Camron called the audio generic.
