= Gods and Generals (video game) =

2003 video game

- Developer: AniVision
- Publisher: Activision Value
- Platform: Microsoft Windows
- Release: NA: March 1, 2003
- Genres: First-person shooter, historical
- Mode: Single-player

Gods and Generals is a 2003 first-person shooter game developed by AniVision and published by Activision Value. The game is based on the film of the same name. The player commands a soldier in the midst of the American Civil War, choosing either to side with the Union or the Confederacy, and plays alongside hordes of other soldiers. The player is tasked with various missions such as raids and reconnaissance while leading a full army company. In large-scale battles ranging from the Second Battle of Bull Run, the Battle of Chancellorsville, and the Battle of Fredericksburg, players are equipped with muskets, revolvers, sabers and other weapons. This nine-part campaign game uses various scenes from the film.

Gods and Generals was released on March 1, 2003, as a Windows exclusive, and was critically panned by the media and gaming community.

== Reception ==
On Metacritic, the game received a 19 out of 100, an "overwhelming dislike", based on four critics. GameSpot named it the worst game of 2003, describing Gods and Generals as "a shoddy afterthought of an unrelated marketing campaign."
