= America's 10 Most Wanted =

2003 video game

- Developer: Black Ops Entertainment
- Publishers: NA: Encore Software; EU: Play-It
- Platforms: PlayStation 2, Microsoft Windows
- Release: NA: 18 November 2003; EU: 6 August 2004
- Genre: First-person shooter
- Modes: Single-player, multiplayer

America's 10 Most Wanted, released as Fugitive Hunter: War on Terror in the US, is a first-person shooter game for the PlayStation 2 and Microsoft Windows platforms. It was developed by Black Ops Entertainment and was released in 2003 in North America and 2004 in Europe.

The game received a mostly negative reception due to its dated graphics and poor gameplay. The game also gained notoriety for its final boss encounter, in which the player engages Osama bin Laden in a hand-to-hand fight.

== Gameplay ==
The game places the player into the role of Jake Seaver, a CIFR agent. Travelling to locations such as Pakistan, Utah, the Caribbean, Paris, and Miami, the game finishes in Afghanistan, where the player must capture Osama bin Laden.

The game is primarily a first-person shooter, with gameplay switching to a one-on-one fighting game when the player attempts to capture a fugitive. The game contains 11 levels, one for each fugitive, as well as an introductory level.

== Development ==
Preliminary development on the game dated back to 1998. A level set in New York City near the World Trade Center was planned, but scrapped after the September 11 attacks.

In the United States, Infogrames was originally going to publish the title through their Atari label in June 2003, but the company dropped the release and was instead picked up by Encore Software in October 2003.

The European and US versions differ slightly in level music and terrorist names with Saddam Hussein only being present in the European version. The European manual shows Mullah Omar as one of the terrorists despite being absent in both versions.

== Soundtrack ==
The game contains tracks and cameos by members of So Solid Crew.

== Reception ==
Critic scores

Aggregate score
| Aggregator | Score |
|---|---|
| Metacritic | 35/100 |

Review scores
| Publication | Score |
|---|---|
| GameSpot | 3.4/10 |
| GameSpy | 3/5 |
| IGN | 3.3/10 |

The game was generally received poorly due to its dated graphics and substandard gameplay. Brad Shoemaker of GameSpot said the game's "lousy execution" caused the game to be "impossible to recommend". Scott Rhodie of CNET Australia panned the game's sound as "pathetic", the gameplay as "terrible", the graphics as "an embarrassment", and the game's premise "simply shocking". The game also gained notoriety for its final boss encounter in which the player engages Osama bin Laden in a hand-to-hand fight before capturing him, which brought further attention to the game in the aftermath of bin Laden's death in a US military operation in 2011.

GameSpot included the game in their list of the "Top 10 Most Frightfully Bad Games of 2004", where reviewer Alex Navarro jokingly accused the game's developers of "exploiting the war on terror".
