= Aquaman: Battle for Atlantis =

2003 video game

- Developer: Lucky Chicken Games
- Publisher: TDK Mediactive
- Directors: Jamie Ottilie; Jon Hilliard; James Ryman; Matt Saia
- Designer: Matt Saia
- Composer: Tommy Tallarico
- Engine: RenderWare
- Platforms: GameCube, Xbox
- Release: NA: July 30, 2003
- Genre: Action-adventure
- Mode: Single-player

Aquaman: Battle for Atlantis is a 2003 action-adventure video game for the Xbox and GameCube systems. Developed by Lucky Chicken Games and published by TDK, it is based on Peter David's controversial interpretation of the DC Comics character Aquaman. It was released exclusively in North America on July 30, 2003, and received generally unfavorable reviews.

== Plot ==
After a long absence and being presumed dead, Aquaman's mortal enemy Black Manta has returned. Bringing with him waves upon waves of dedicated warriors, Manta intends to terrorize and ultimately destroy Aquaman's kingdom of Atlantis. In order to protect his subjects and the rest of the seven seas from Manta's evil machinations, Aquaman must venture into his city, save his people, and defeat Black Manta. Little does he know, however, that there is an even greater enemy waiting, who will attempt to take the Throne of Atlantis right out from under him.

== Gameplay ==
The purpose of the game is to save Atlantis from doom. The player progresses by swimming around the level and defeating the enemies there. The levels are filled with empty ruined buildings that Aquaman has to swim around. When Aquaman fights, he can punch, kick and grapple with his opponents to defeat them. There are also times where the player can pilot crafts through the water and shoot down enemy submarines.

== Development ==
In October 2001, TDK Mediactive reached a long-term deal with DC Comics to develop video games based on the Aquaman character, starting with the newly released platforms of the sixth console generation. The announcement specified that the games would be created on multiple platforms, and that the first game would likely see release sometime in 2002. Lucky Chicken Games was chosen as the development studio for the game that would come to be titled Aquaman: Battle for Atlantis, and the game was scheduled for release in mid-2003.

The release of the game coincided with a newly launching volume of the Aquaman ongoing series from DC Comics, which also debuted in 2003 with a new #1 issue.

== Reception ==
Reception

Aggregate score
Aggregator	Score	
Aggregator	GameCube	Xbox
Metacritic	27/100	26/100

Review scores
Publication	Score	
Publication	GameCube	Xbox
Game Informer	2/10	2/10
GameSpot	2.3/10	2.3/10
GameZone	N/A	4.5/10
IGN	3/10	N/A
Nintendo Power	1.6/5	N/A
Official Xbox Magazine (US)	N/A	4.1/10
TeamXbox	N/A	2.3/10
X-Play	N/A	1/5
Maxim	4/10	4/10
The Village Voice	5/10	N/A

The game received "generally unfavorable" reviews on both platforms according to the review aggregator website Metacritic.
