= Madden NFL 2004 =

2003 video game

- North American Xbox cover art featuring Michael Vick
- Developers: EA Tiburon; Budcat (PS & GBA)
- Publisher: EA Sports
- Series: Madden NFL
- Platforms: Game Boy Advance; GameCube; PlayStation; PlayStation 2; Windows; Xbox
- Release: August 11, 2003: GameCube, PlayStation 2, Windows, Xbox; NA: August 11, 2003; AU: August 15, 2004 (PC); AU: September 5, 2003 (GC, Xbox); AU: September 11, 2003 (PS2); EU: September 12, 2003 PlayStation, Game Boy Advance; NA: August 11, 2003
- Genre: Sports
- Modes: Single-player, multiplayer

Madden NFL 2004 is the fourteenth installment of the Madden NFL series of American football video games. Former Atlanta Falcons quarterback Michael Vick is on the cover.

== Gameplay ==
New features in Madden 2004 include a new owner mode option that allows the player to control a franchise. In this mode, the player takes on all the responsibilities related to owning a professional football team, from regulating hot dog prices, to team relocation, to hiring and firing coaching staff. Another new feature is the ability to edit a historic team. Also, a new training camp mode, occurring before the preseason, that can help player progress faster by putting him through mini-camp drills.

This Madden game is best known for its version of then-Falcons quarterback Michael Vick, an arguably overpowered character and by acclaim the greatest Madden player of all-time due to his 95 speed rating. In 2016, developer Clint Oldenburg told Gameradar that over the next several years "features were added to the game specifically to stop Vick." The 04 version of Vick has been used in Madden NFL 25 and 15 in Ultimate Team mode as a 99 overall with either 99 or 100 speed.

The game is an EA Sports Bio game, and is compatible with other EA Sports games with the feature (NCAA Football 2004, NASCAR Thunder 2004).

The soundtrack of the game features various hip hop and rock songs.

== Development ==
The game had a marketing budget of $8.6 million.

== Reception ==
Reception

Aggregate scores
Aggregator	Score					
Aggregator	GBA	GameCube	PC	PS	PS2	Xbox
GameRankings	74.60%	91.54%	88.40%	80%	91.77%	89.24%
Metacritic	70/100	94/100	91/100	80/100	94/100	92/100

Review scores
Publication	Score					
Publication	GBA	GameCube	PC	PS	PS2	Xbox
AllGame	N/A	N/A	N/A	N/A	4/5	N/A
Electronic Gaming Monthly	N/A	N/A	N/A	N/A	9.33/10	N/A
Game Informer	N/A	8.75/10	N/A	N/A	9.25/10	9/10
GamePro	N/A	5/5	N/A	N/A	5/5	5/5
GameRevolution	N/A	A−	N/A	N/A	A	A−
GameSpot	7.2/10	9.1/10	8.8/10	N/A	9.2/10	9.1/10
GameSpy	N/A	4/5	4/5	N/A	N/A	4.5/5
GameZone	7/10	9.4/10	9/10	N/A	9.7/10	9.3/10
IGN	7/10	9.4/10	9.3/10	N/A	9.5/10	9.4/10
Nintendo Power	3.6/5	4.6/5	N/A	N/A	N/A	N/A
Official U.S. PlayStation Magazine	N/A	N/A	N/A	4/5	5/5	N/A
Official Xbox Magazine (US)	N/A	N/A	N/A	N/A	N/A	8.9/10
PC Gamer (US)	N/A	N/A	76%	N/A	N/A	N/A
The Cincinnati Enquirer	N/A	4.5/5	4.5/5	N/A	4.5/5	4.5/5
Entertainment Weekly	N/A	A	A	N/A	A	A

Upon release, the game sold over 2 million copies in three weeks. It sold more than 5 million copies within a year. By July 2006, the PlayStation 2 version of Madden NFL 2004 had sold 3.5 million copies and earned $170 million in the United States alone. Next Generation ranked it as the fourth highest-selling game launched for the PlayStation 2, Xbox or GameCube between January 2000 and July 2006 in that country. Between those dates, 22 million copies of the Madden series were sold in the United States, of which Madden NFL 2004's PlayStation 2 version had the highest share.

Based on the platform, Madden NFL 2004‘s ratings ranged from universal acclaim to average reviews. GameRankings and Metacritic gave it a score of 91.77% and 94 out of 100 for the PlayStation 2 version; 91.54% and 94 out of 100 for the GameCube version; 89.24% and 92 out of 100 for the Xbox version; 88.40% and 91 out of 100 for the PC version; 80% and 80 out of 100 for the PlayStation version; and 74.60% and 70 out of 100 for the Game Boy Advance version.

Playboy gave the game a score of 100%, stating: "Looking for more depth? Take the owner's seat and relocate your team, set concession stand prices in your new stadium and hire your coaching staff. Ditka: Send us your resume." Entertainment Weekly gave it an A and praised the Owner Mode, "which lets you negotiate salaries, build a stadium, and - for the detail obsessed - even set prices at the concession stands." The Cincinnati Enquirer gave it a score of four-and-a-half stars out of five and stated, "Because of its tight game-play, depth and dizzying amount of features, Madden is still the one to beat."

Madden NFL 2004 was named "Game of the Year" at the 2003 Spike TV Video Game Awards; it was also named Editor's and Reader's Choice "Sports Game of the Year in 2003" on GameCube and PlayStation 2 from IGN. Madden NFL 2004 also won The Electric Playground's 2003 "Best Sports Game for PC" and "Best Console Sports Game" awards, as well as winning "Computer Sports Game of the Year" and "Console Sports Simulation Game of the Year" during the 7th Annual Interactive Achievement Awards.
