= 2001 in video games =

2001 saw many sequels and prequels in video games, such as Madden NFL 2002, NBA Live 2002, NBA 2K2, WWF Smackdown! Just Bring It, Capcom vs. SNK 2, Crazy Taxi 2, Dead or Alive 3, Final Fantasy X, Gran Turismo 3: A-Spec, Grand Theft Auto III, Metal Gear Solid 2: Sons of Liberty, Myst III: Exile, Silent Hill 2, Sonic Adventure 2, SSX Tricky, Super Smash Bros. Melee, Tekken 4, Tony Hawk's Pro Skater 3, and Virtua Fighter 4. New intellectual properties include Phoenix Wright: Ace Attorney, Advance Wars, Animal Crossing, Burnout, Gothic, Black & White, Devil May Cry, Fatal Frame, Ghost Recon, Halo: Combat Evolved, Jak and Daxter, Max Payne, Oni, Onimusha: Warlords, Operation Flashpoint, Pikmin, Pro Evolution Soccer, Red Faction, Serious Sam, and Tropico.

Three major video game systems were released in 2001: the GameCube and the Game Boy Advance by Nintendo, and the Xbox by Microsoft. Sega, which had been a major competitor in the video game hardware market to this point, ended its involvement in the market after the failure of the Dreamcast.

The year 2001 is remembered for its influence on the video game industry with the release of many games recognized as classics. Many video games released in 2001 defined or redefined their respective genres, including hack and slash game Devil May Cry, first-person shooter game Halo: Combat Evolved, and open world action-adventure game Grand Theft Auto III, which is regarded as an industry-defining work.

The year has been retrospectively considered one of the best and most influential in video game history due to the release of numerous critically acclaimed, commercially successful and influential titles across all platforms and genres at the time. It was the peak year for the sixth generation of video game consoles, with the launch of the GameCube and Xbox, the latter focusing on online games (following SegaNet the previous year), and the Dreamcast's last year of production with Sega's exit from console manufacturing. Storytelling and mature themes also became a more mainstream trend.

The year's best-selling video game worldwide was Pokémon Gold/Silver/Crystal, the fourth year in a row for the Pokémon series (since 1998). The year's most critically acclaimed titles were Gran Turismo 3 and Final Fantasy X in Japan, and Halo and Grand Theft Auto III in the West.

== Legend ==
Video game platforms
DC	Dreamcast	GBA	Game Boy Advance, iQue GBA	GBC	Game Boy Color
GCN	GameCube	N64	Nintendo 64, iQue Player	PS1	PlayStation 1
PS2	PlayStation 2	WIN	Windows, all versions Windows 95 and up	XB	Xbox, Xbox Live Arcade

== Hardware releases ==
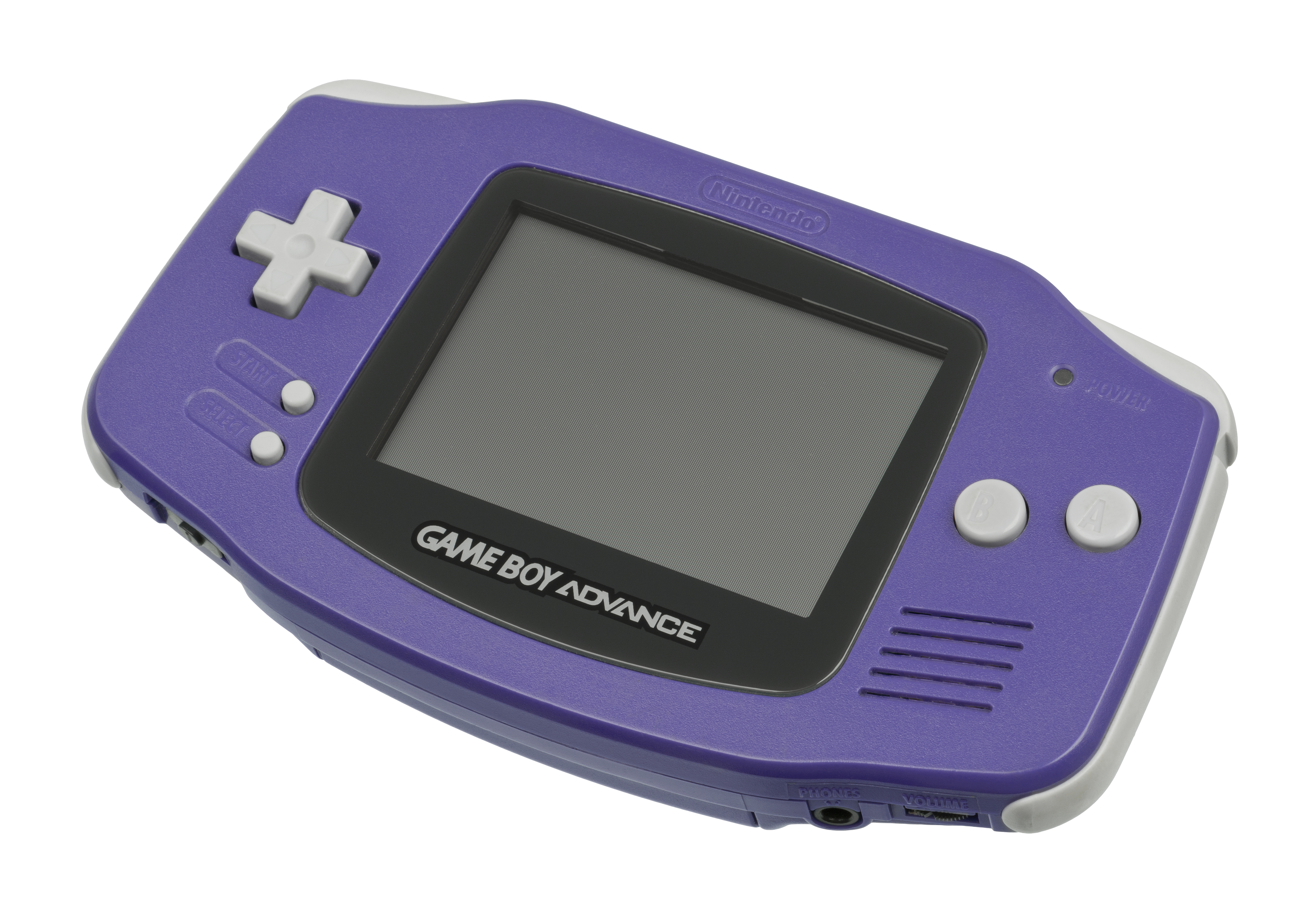
Game Boy Advance

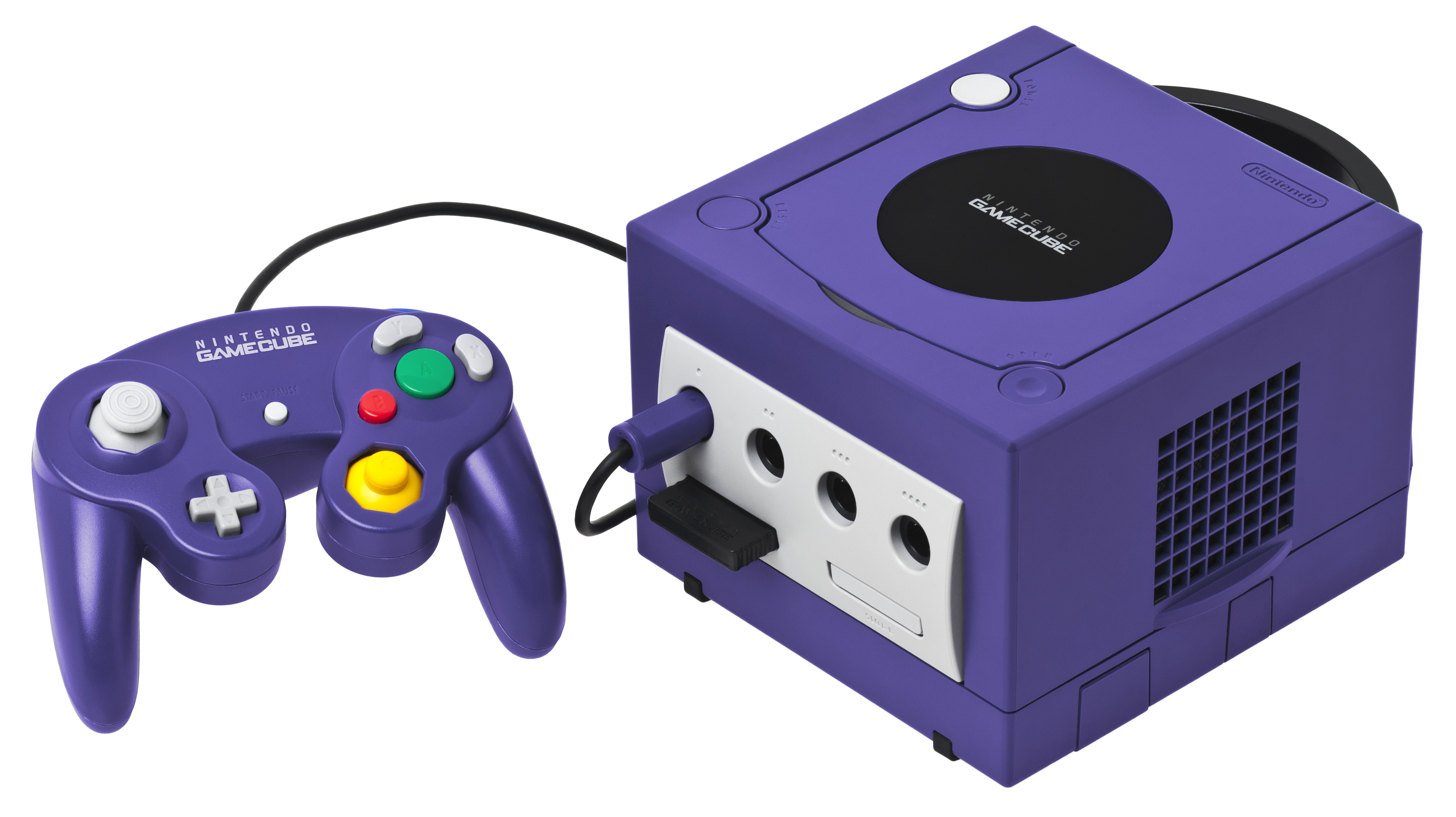
GameCube

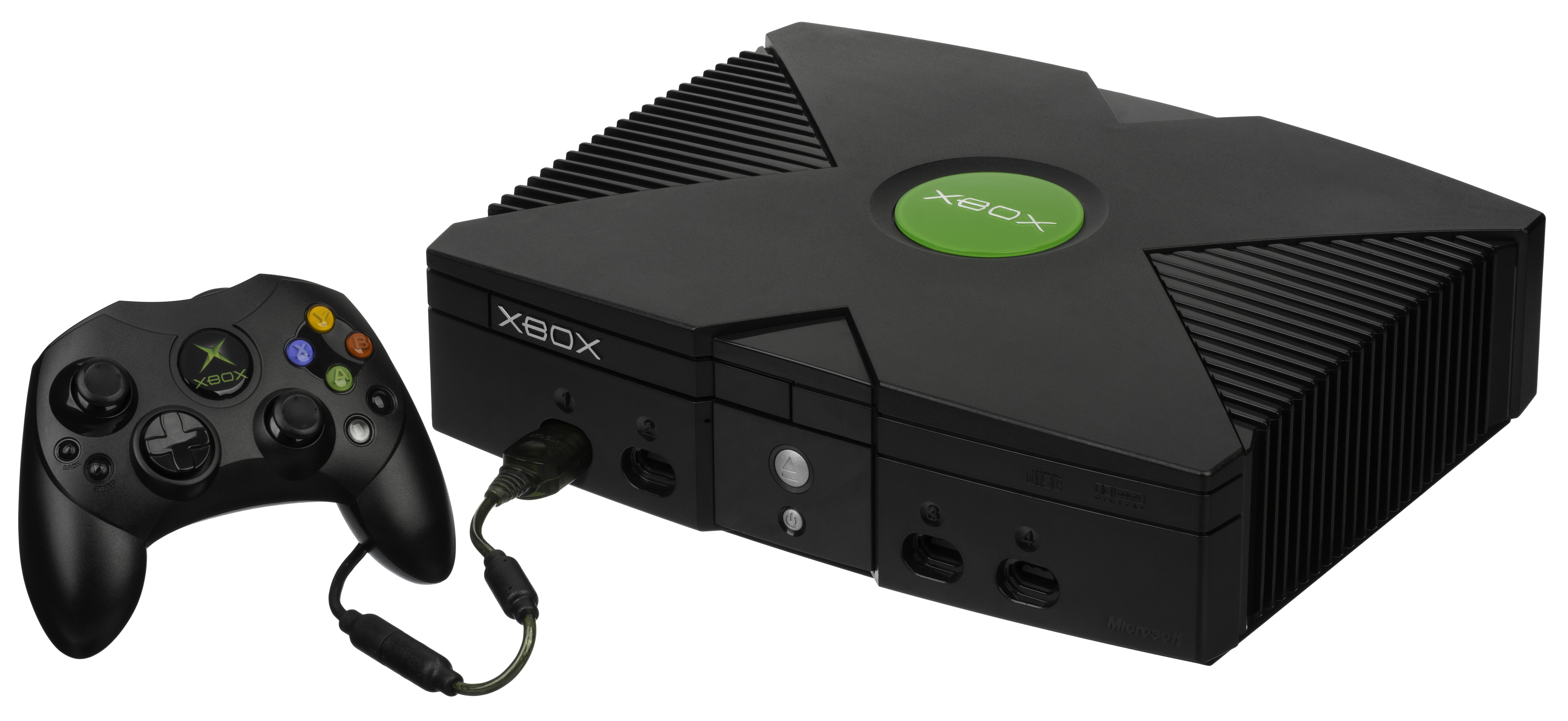
Microsoft released its first home console, the Xbox.

This is a list of game hardware released in 2001.

Nintendo released two consoles this year; the Game Boy Advance, the second & final entry in the Game Boy family (excluding revision models), and the GameCube, Nintendo's home console entry in the sixth generation of game consoles.

Microsoft entered the video game industry this year with the launch of the Xbox.

Month	Day	Console
March	21	Game Boy Advance^{JP}
June	11	Game Boy Advance^{NA}
June	22	Game Boy Advance^{PAL}
September	14	GameCube^{JP}
November	15	Xbox
November	16	Pokémon Mini
November	18	GameCube^{NA}

== Top-rated games ==
=== Major awards ===
GameRankings named Metal Gear Solid 2: Sons of Liberty the Game of the Year for 2001, citing its position as the highest-rated title of the year with an aggregated score of 97% based on reviews from more than 50 gaming publications.

Game of the Year awards for 2001
Awards	Game of the Year	Platform(s)	Publisher(s)	Genre	Ref.
Electronic Playground	Grand Theft Auto III	PS2	Rockstar Games	Open world	
GameRevolution	Grand Theft Auto III	PS2	Rockstar Games	Open world	
British Academy Games Awards	Gran Turismo 3 A-Spec	PS2	Polyphony Digital	Racing	
British Academy Games Awards	Halo Combat Evolved	XB	Bungie	FPS	
British Academy Games Awards	Max Payne	WIN	Rockstar Games	Third Person Shooter	
D.I.C.E. Award for Game of the Year	Halo Combat Evolved	XB	Bungie	FPS	
Game Developers Choice Awards	Grand Theft Auto III	PS2	Rockstar Games	Open world	
Golden Joystick Awards	Grand Theft Auto III	PS2	Rockstar Games	Open world	
Japan Game Awards	Final Fantasy X	PS2	SquareSoft	Role-Playing	
EGM Magazine	Halo Combat Evolved	XB	Bungie	FPS	
Eurogamer	Grand Theft Auto III	PS2	Rockstar Games	Open world	
Game Informer	Metal Gear Solid 2: Sons of Liberty	PS2	Konami	Stealth game	
GameSpot	Grand Theft Auto III	PS2	Rockstar Games	Open world	
IGN	Halo Combat Evolved	XB	Bungie	FPS	

=== Critically acclaimed titles ===
==== Famitsu Platinum Hall of Fame ====
In Japan, the following video game releases in 2001 entered Famitsu magazine's "Platinum Hall of Fame" for receiving Famitsu scores of at least 35 out of 40.

Title	Platform(s)	Publisher	Genre	Score (out of 40)
Gran Turismo 3: A-Spec	PS2	Sony	Racing simulation	39
Final Fantasy X	PS2	Squaresoft	Role-playing	39
Fushigi no Dungeon: Fūrai no Shiren GB2	GBC	Chunsoft	Roguelike	38
Metal Gear Solid 2: Sons of Liberty	PS2	Konami	Stealth	38
Culdcept Second	DC	Media Factory	Turn-based strategy	37
Dai Rantō Smash Brothers DX (Super Smash Bros. Melee)	GCN	Nintendo	Fighting	37
Dōbutsu no Mori + (Animal Crossing)	GCN	Nintendo	Social simulation	37
Dragon Quest Characters: Torneko no Daibōken 2 (The Last Hope)	GBA	Enix	Roguelike	36
Madden NFL 2001	PS2	Square EA	Sports	35
Onimusha (Onimusha: Warlords)	PS2	Capcom	Hack and slash	35
Kessen II	PS2	Koei	Real-time tactics	35
Crazy Taxi 2	DC	Sega	Driving	35
Zeonic Front: Kidō Senshi Gundam 0079 (Mobile Suit Gundam)	PS2	Bandai	Strategy	35
Capcom vs. SNK 2: Millionaire Fighting 2001	DC, PS2	Capcom	Fighting	35
Magical Vacation	GBA	Nintendo	Role-playing	35
Battle Network Rockman EXE 2 (Mega Man Battle Network 2)	GBA	Capcom	Tactical role-playing	35

==== Metacritic and GameRankings ====
In the West, Metacritic (MC) and GameRankings (GR) are aggregators of video game journalism reviews.

2001 games and expansions scoring at least 88/100 (MC) or 87.5% (GR)
Game	Publisher	Release date	Platform(s)	MC score	GR score
Halo: Combat Evolved	Microsoft Game Studios	November 15, 2001	XB	97/100	95.54%
Grand Theft Auto III	Rockstar Games	October 22, 2001	PS2	97/100	95.19%
Metal Gear Solid 2: Sons of Liberty	Konami	November 13, 2001	PS2	96/100	95.09%
Gran Turismo 3: A-Spec	Sony Computer Entertainment	April 28, 2001	PS2	95/100	94.54%
Tony Hawk's Pro Skater 3	Activision	October 30, 2001	PS2	97/100	93.43%
Devil May Cry	Capcom	August 23, 2001	PS2	94/100	92.6%
Tony Hawk's Pro Skater 2	Activision	June 11, 2001	GBA	95/100	89.88%
Madden NFL 2002	EA Sports	August 19, 2001	PS2	94/100	92.32%
NBA 2K2	Sega	October 24, 2001	DC	93/100	92.82%
Mario Kart: Super Circuit	Nintendo	July 21, 2001	GBA	93/100	91.54%
SSX Tricky	EA Sports	November 5, 2001	PS2	92/100	92.49%
Advance Wars	Nintendo	September 10, 2001	GBA	92/100	92.38%
Super Mario World: Super Mario Advance 2	Nintendo	December 14, 2001	GBA	92/100	92.36%
The Legend of Zelda: Oracle of Ages	Nintendo	February 27, 2001	GBC	—N/a	92.2%
Final Fantasy X	Square	July 19, 2001	PS2	92/100	91.73%
Super Smash Bros. Melee	Nintendo	November 21, 2001	GCN	92/100	90.52%
Conker's Bad Fur Day	Rare	March 5, 2001	N64	92/100	89.28%
NHL 2002	EA Sports	September 24, 2001	PS2	92/100	88.84%
Pro Evolution Soccer	Konami	March 15, 2001	PS2	—N/a	91.69%
The Legend of Zelda: Oracle of Seasons	Nintendo	February 27, 2001	GBC	—N/a	91.37%
Tony Hawk's Pro Skater 3	Activision	November 18, 2001	GCN	91/100	91.12%
IL-2 Sturmovik	1C Company	November 18, 2001	WIN	91/100	90.65%
Golden Sun	Nintendo	August 1, 2001	GBA	91/100	89.1%
Twisted Metal: Black	Sony Computer Entertainment	June 18, 2001	PS2	91/100	88.52%
Castlevania: Circle of the Moon	Konami	March 21, 2001	GBA	91/100	88.11%
Klonoa 2: Lunatea's Veil	Namco	March 22, 2001	PS2	91/100	84.76%
Madden NFL 2002	EA Sports	November 17, 2001	GCN	89/100	90.39%
Ico	Sony Computer Entertainment	September 24, 2001	PS2	90/100	90.29%
NCAA Football 2002	EA Sports	July 23, 2001	PS2	90/100	90.25%
Jak and Daxter: The Precursor Legacy	Sony Computer Entertainment	December 3, 2001	PS2	90/100	90.22%
Star Wars Rogue Squadron II: Rogue Leader	LucasArts	November 18, 2001	GCN	90/100	90.04%
Black & White	Electronic Arts	March 30, 2001	WIN	90/100	89.79%
NFL 2K2	Sega	September 19, 2001	DC	90/100	89.35%
Civilization III	Infogrames	October 30, 2001	WIN	90/100	88.75%
Madden NFL 2002	EA Sports	October 31, 2001	XB	90/100	88.72%
Unreal Tournament	Infogrames	March 13, 2001	DC	90/100	87.8%
Virtua Tennis 2	Sega	October 24, 2001	DC	90/100	87.22%
Dance Dance Revolution	Konami	March 6, 2001	PS1	90/100	83.63%
Microsoft Flight Simulator 2002	Microsoft	October 16, 2001	WIN	90/100	82.44%
Shenmue II	Sega	September 6, 2001	DC	—N/a	89.63%
Max Payne	Gathering of Developers	July 23, 2001	WIN	89/100	89.26%
NASCAR Racing 4	Sierra Entertainment	February 6, 2001	WIN	89/100	88.5%
NBA Street	EA Sports	June 19, 2001	PS2	89/100	86.92%
Pikmin	Nintendo	October 26, 2001	GCN	89/100	86.71%
Final Fantasy Chronicles	Square	June 29, 2001	PS1	89/100	86.7%
NHL 2002	EA Sports	December 10, 2001	XB	89/100	86.33%
Ace Combat 04: Shattered Skies	Namco	September 13, 2001	PS2	89/100	86.07%
Max Payne	Rockstar Games	December 12, 2001	XB	89/100	85.95%
Silent Hill 2	Konami	September 24, 2001	PS2	89/100	85.82%
Sonic Adventure 2	Sega	June 23, 2001	DC	89/100	83.26%
Baldur's Gate II: Throne of Bhaal	Interplay Entertainment	June 22, 2001	WIN	88/100	88.73%
Super Monkey Ball	Sega	September 14, 2001	GCN	87/100	88.7%
Red Faction	THQ	May 22, 2001	PS2	88/100	88.32%
Dark Age of Camelot	Vivendi Universal Games	October 10, 2001	WIN	88/100	88.08%
Return to Castle Wolfenstein	Activision	November 19, 2001	WIN	88/100	86.75%
SSX Tricky	EA Sports	December 10, 2001	XB	88/100	86.6%
Wario Land 4	Nintendo	August 21, 2001	GBA	88/100	85.34%
Madden NFL 2002	EA Sports	August 13, 2001	PS1	88/100	85.08%
Tribes 2	Sierra Entertainment	March 28, 2001	WIN	88/100	84.85%
Tactics Ogre: The Knight of Lodis	Nintendo	June 21, 2001	GBA	88/100	83.62%

== Financial performance ==
=== Best-selling home video games ===
Best-selling home video games in Japan and the United States
Rank	Title	Platform(s)	Publisher	Sales		
Rank	Title	Platform(s)	Publisher	Japan	United States	Combined
1	Pokémon Gold / Silver / Crystal	GBC	Nintendo	826,125 (Note: Crystal Version sold 749,863. Gold and Silver versions sold 76,262.)	3,127,659	3,953,784
2	Final Fantasy X	PS2	Squaresoft	2,434,015	746,632	3,180,647
3	Gran Turismo 3: A-Spec	PS2	Sony	1,656,959	1,172,322	2,829,281
4	Metal Gear Solid 2: Sons of Liberty	PS2	Konami	750,560	1,800,000+	2,550,560+
5	Madden NFL 2002	PS1, PS2	EA Sports	—N/a	2,220,112	2,220,112
6	The Legend of Zelda: Oracle of Seasons / Oracle of Ages	GBC	Nintendo	772,858	1,248,191	2,021,049
7	Grand Theft Auto III	PS2	Rockstar	—N/a	1,965,832	1,965,832
8	Super Mario Advance	GBA	Nintendo	777,899	1,172,323+	1,950,222+
9	Harry Potter and the Philosopher's Stone	PS1, WIN	EA	83,954	1,628,744	1,712,698
10	The Sims	WIN	EA	—N/a	1,482,182	1,482,182

Highest-grossing home video games in the United States and Europe
Rank	Title	Platform(s)	Sales revenue			
Rank	Title	Platform(s)	USA	Europe	Combined	Inflation
1	Pokémon Gold / Silver / Crystal	GBC	$91,038,324	€221,000,000 ($198,000,000)	$289,038,324	$526,000,000
2	Grand Theft Auto III	PS2	$98,940,325	€54,000,000 ($48,000,000)	$146,940,325	$267,000,000
3	Harry Potter and the Philosopher's Stone		$55,148,445	€92,000,000 ($82,000,000)	$137,148,445	$249,000,000
4	Gran Turismo 3: A-Spec	PS2	$58,264,403	€64,000,000 ($57,000,000)	$115,264,403	$210,000,000
5	Madden NFL 2002	PS1, PS2	$110,000,000	Unknown	$110,000,000+	$200,000,000+
6	Tony Hawk's Pro Skater 3		$81,000,000	€24,000,000 ($21,000,000)	$102,000,000	$185,000,000
7	Metal Gear Solid 2: Sons of Liberty	PS2	$87,000,000+	—N/a	$87,000,000+	$158,000,000+
8	The Sims	WIN	$60,499,079	€25,000,000 ($22,000,000)	$82,499,079	$150,000,000
9	Super Mario Advance	GBA	$37,000,000+	€23,000,000 ($21,000,000)	$56,000,000+	$102,000,000+
10	FIFA Football 2002		Unknown	€52,000,000 ($47,000,000)	$47,000,000+	$85,000,000+

==== Japan ====
Best-selling home video games in Japan
Rank	Title	Platform	Sales	Sales revenue	Inflation	Ref
1	Final Fantasy X	PS2	2,434,015	¥17,600,000,000+ ($145,000,000+)	$264,000,000+	
2	Gran Turismo 3: A-Spec	PS2	1,656,959	Unknown		
3	Dragon Quest Monsters 2	GBC	1,138,756	Unknown		
4	Dragon Quest IV: Michibikareshi Monotachi	PS1	1,039,443	Unknown		
5	Onimusha (Onimusha: Warlords)	PS2	1,000,000+	Unknown		
6	Minna no Golf 3 (Everybody's Golf 3)	PS2	871,167	Unknown		
7	Dai Rantō Smash Brothers DX (Smash Bros. Melee)	GCN	838,237	Unknown		
8	Pocket Monsters: Gold / Silver / Crystal (Pokémon)	GBC	826,125	Unknown		
9	Winning Eleven 5 (Pro Evolution Soccer)	PS2	789,515	Unknown		
10	Super Mario Advance	GBA	777,899	Unknown		

==== United States ====
Best-selling home video games in the United States
Rank	Title	Platform(s)	Sales	Revenue	Inflation	Ref
1	Pokémon Gold / Silver / Crystal	GBC	3,127,659	$91,038,324	$166,000,000	
2	Madden NFL 2002	PS2, PS1	2,220,112	$110,000,000	$200,000,000	
3	Grand Theft Auto III	PS2	1,965,832	$98,940,325	$180,000,000	
4	Metal Gear Solid 2: Sons of Liberty	PS2	1,800,000+	$87,000,000+	$160,000,000+	
5	Tony Hawk's Pro Skater 3	PS2, PS1	1,693,037	$81,000,000	$147,000,000	
6	Harry Potter and the Sorcerer's Stone	PS1, WIN	1,628,744	$55,148,445	$100,000,000	
7	The Sims	WIN	1,482,182	$60,499,079	$110,000,000	
8	The Legend of Zelda: Oracle of Seasons / Oracle of Ages	GBC	1,248,191	$39,000,000	$71,000,000	
9	Super Mario Advance	GBA	1,172,323+	$35,000,000+	$64,000,000+	
10	Gran Turismo 3: A-Spec	PS2	1,172,322	$58,264,403	$106,000,000	

==== PAL regions ====
Highest-grossing home video games in Europe
Rank	Title	Platform(s)	Publisher	Genre	Sales revenue	Inflation
1	Pokémon Gold / Silver / Crystal	GBC	Nintendo	Role-playing	€221,000,000 ($198,000,000)	$360,000,000
2	Harry Potter and the Philosopher's Stone		Electronic Arts	Action-adventure	€92,000,000 ($82,000,000)	$150,000,000
3	Gran Turismo 3: A-Spec	PS2	Sony	Racing sim	€64,000,000 ($57,000,000)	$104,000,000
4	Grand Theft Auto III	PS2	Rockstar Games	Action-adventure	€54,000,000 ($48,000,000)	$87,000,000
5	FIFA Football 2002		EA Sports	Sports	€52,000,000 ($47,000,000)	$85,000,000
6	Who Wants to Be a Millionaire?		Eidos Interactive	Quiz	€33,000,000 ($30,000,000)	$55,000,000
7	FIFA 2001		EA Sports	Sports	€31,000,000 ($28,000,000)	$51,000,000
8	Final Fantasy IX	PS1	Squaresoft	Role-playing	€30,000,000 ($27,000,000)	$49,000,000
9	Black & White	WIN	Electronic Arts	God game	€28,000,000 ($25,000,000)	$45,000,000
10	The Sims	WIN	Electronic Arts	Life simulation	€25,000,000 ($22,000,000)	$40,000,000

Best-selling home video games in Australia
Rank	Title	Platform	Developer	Publisher	Genre
1	Pokémon Crystal	GBC	Game Freak	Nintendo	Role-playing
2	Pokémon Gold	GBC	Game Freak	Nintendo	Role-playing
3	Pokémon Silver	GBC	Game Freak	Nintendo	Role-playing
4	Harry Potter and the Philosopher's Stone	PS1	Argonaut Games	Electronic Arts	Action-adventure
5	Harry Potter and the Philosopher's Stone	GBC	Griptonite Games	Electronic Arts	Role-playing
6	Gran Turismo 3: A-Spec	PS2	Polyphony Digital	Sony	Racing simulation
7	Gran Turismo 2	PS1	Polyphony Digital	Sony	Racing simulation
8	Pokémon Stadium 2	N64	Nintendo EAD	Nintendo	Turn-based strategy
9	Super Mario Advance	GBA	Nintendo R&D2	Nintendo	Platformer
10	Crash Bandicoot 3: Warped	PS1	Naughty Dog	Sony	Platformer

=== Highest-grossing arcade games in Japan ===
Highest-grossing arcade games in Japan
Rank	Title	Developer	Manufacturer	Type	Genre	Points
1	Canvas Shot / Flash Shot / Chaopi	Omron	Omron	Other	Purikura	8712
2	Derby Owners Club	Sega AM3	Sega	Dedicated	Simulation	3837
3	Battle Gear 2	Taito	Taito	Dedicated	Racing	2601
4	Tekken Tag Tournament	Namco	Namco	Software	Fighting	2568
5	Shakatto Tambourine (Samba de Amigo)	Sega	Sega	Dedicated	Rhythm	2523
6	Time Crisis 2	Namco	Namco	Dedicated	Light gun shooter	2400
7	The King of Fighters 2000	SNK	SNK	Software	Fighting	2382
8	Virtua Striker 2 ver. 2000	Sega AM2	Sega	Software	Sports	2345
9	Street Snap EG	Hitachi	Hitachi	Other	Purikura	2291
10	Kidō Senshi Gundam: Renpō vs. Zeon (Federation vs. Zeon)	Capcom	Banpresto	Software	Third-person shooter	2280

== Major events ==
Date	Event
January 22	Naughty Dog is acquired by Sony Computer Entertainment.
January 29	Infogrames acquired Hasbro Interactive, including the Game.com division, the MicroProse and Atari labels, and a right to publish and develop games based on Hasbro properties. Paradigm Entertainment was also acquired.
January 31	Sega announced it would be departing from the console market and discontinuing the Dreamcast, and develop and publish games for the GameCube, PlayStation 2, and Xbox.

== Events ==
- Academy of Interactive Arts & Sciences hosts the 4th Annual Interactive Achievement Awards; inducts John Carmack of id Software to the AIAS Hall of Fame.
- British Academy of Film and Television Arts (BAFTA) hosts the 4th annual BAFTA Interactive Entertainment Awards for multimedia technologies; 15 of 21 awards go to video games.
- March 21 – The Game Boy Advance handheld is released by Nintendo. Also to back-up the GBA's identical graphics to the SNES an enhanced remake of Super Mario Bros. 2 was launched.
- May 17–19 – 7th annual Electronic Entertainment Expo (E3); the 4th annual Game Critics Awards For The Best Of E3
- June 23 – Sonic the Hedgehog celebrates its 10th anniversary.
- July – IEMA (Interactive Entertainment Merchants Association) hosts 2nd annual Executive Summit.
- Gama Network hosts the 3rd annual Independent Games Festival (IGF).
- Game Developers Conference hosts the 1st annual Game Developers Choice Awards.
- Spring – Reuters reports that the Dreamcast console has an estimated 800,000 online users playing its various online games already by midyear.
- Sony cooperates with AOL to incorporate Internet features with the PlayStation 2 console; which include a browser, email, and instant messaging capabilities.
- August – 2nd annual Dreamcast Championships (featuring the Crazy Taxi 2 video game).
- Nikkei News reports that the video game Phantasy Star Online (for Dreamcast) has had 300,000 worldwide users login already by midyear.
- September 14 – Nintendo releases the GameCube and its launch titles Luigi's Mansion and Wave Race: Blue Storm.
- November 15 – The Microsoft Xbox is introduced.
- November 18 – Nintendo releases the GameCube in North America with launch titles Luigi's Mansion and Wave Race: Blue Storm.
- November 23 – Game Park releases the GP32 wireless-multiplayer multimedia handheld console in South Korea.
- December 5–9 – World Cyber Games 2001 are held in South Korea
- December 31 – Jez San is awarded an OBE in the New Year Honours, becoming the first person awarded specifically for services to video games.
- December – Panasonic releases the GameCube-based Q multimedia console.

=== Business ===
- Defunct companies: Bullfrog Productions, Indrema, Dynamix, Sanctuary Woods, SNK.
- After Dynamix (1984–2001) is closed as part of Sierra's restructuring under Vivendi Universal, several veterans of the studio found GarageGames.
- Sega announces that it will no longer develop home consoles, to focus on game development. The Dreamcast is discontinued in May, but games including Sonic the Hedgehog will continue to be released.
- Activision acquires Treyarch Invention LLC.
- PCCW Japan (Pacific Century CyberWorks Japan Co., Ltd.) acquires VR1 Entertainment.
- Long-time arcade developer Midway Games announces that it will no longer manufacture arcade games.
- August – Loki Software declares Chapter 11 Bankruptcy over internal financial troubles, before going defunct next January. In response Michael Simms of the Tux Games retailer and former Loki game tester founds Linux Game Publishing alongside ex-Loki employee Mike Philips on October 15 to keep games coming to Linux.
- October – Infogrames announces to revive Atari as a sub-brand of Infogrames. Splashdown, MX Rider and TransWorld Surf were the first 3 games to receive this treatment.

=== Lawsuits ===
- Sega of America Inc. v. Kmart Corporation; Sega sues Kmart over an unpaid debt of over US$2 million
- Uri Geller v. Nintendo; Geller sues Nintendo over his resemblance to a Pokémon character. The suit is dismissed.

== Games released in 2001 ==
Release date	Title	Platform	Genre	Developer	Publisher	Ref.
January 4	RuneScape	WIN				
January 10	Mega Man 64	N64				
January 16	Mario Tennis	GBC				
January 29	Oni	WIN, PS2				
January 29	Phantasy Star Online	DC				
January 30	Rayman Revolution	PS2				
January 31	Mega Man X5	PS1				
February 5	Paper Mario	N64				
February 6	Action Man: Search for Base X	GBC				
February 6	Metal Walker	GBC				
February 7	Clive Barker's Undying	WIN				
February 16	Final Fantasy IX (EU)	PS1				
February 20	Scooby-Doo! Classic Creep Capers	GBC				
February 23	Severance: Blade of Darkness	WIN				
February 27	The Legend of Zelda: Oracle of Seasons and Oracle of Ages (JP)	GBC				
March 1	Lego Island 2 The Brickster's Revenge	WIN, PS1, GBC, GBA				
March 5	Conker's Bad Fur Day	N64				
March 6	The Bouncer	PS2				
March 9	Sonic Shuffle	DC				
March 12	Star Wars: Episode I: Battle for Naboo	WIN				
March 13	Onimusha: Warlords	PS2				
March 13	Unreal Tournament	DC				
March 14	Aidyn Chronicles: The First Mage	N64				
March 15	SpongeBob SquarePants: Legend of the Lost Spatula	GBC				
March 20	Summoner	WIN				
March 21	Daytona USA	DC				
March 21	Serious Sam: The First Encounter	WIN				
March 21	Tribes 2	WIN				
March 22	Klonoa 2: Lunatea's Veil	PS2				
March 23	Hostile Waters: Antaeus Rising	WIN				
March 25	Black & White	WIN				
March 26	Pokémon Stadium 2	N64				
March 26	The Simpsons: Night of the Living Treehouse of Horror	GBC				
March 26	Zone of the Enders	PS2				
March 27	Rocket Power: Gettin' Air	GBC				
March 27	Strikers 1945 II	PS1				
March 30	Indiana Jones and the Infernal Machine	GBC				
March 30	Star Wars: Episode I: Battle for Naboo (EU)	N64				
April 6	Snoopy Tennis	GBC				
April 8	Dr. Mario 64	N64				
April 11	Kirby Tilt 'n' Tumble	GBC				
April 12	The Simpsons Wrestling	PS1				
April 16	Batman: Chaos in Gotham	GBC				
April 16	Illbleed	DC				
April 19	Spider-Man	DC				
April 23	Silpheed: The Lost Planet	PS2				
April 30	The Adventures of Cookie & Cream	PS2				
April 30	Mars Matrix: Hyper Solid Shooting	DC				
May 7	Mario Party 3	N64				
May 8	Myst III: Exile	WIN, PS2				
May 14	Crazy Taxi	PS2				
May 16	Giga Wing 2	DC				
May 16	Project Justice	DC				
May 18	Atlantis The Lost Empire: Trial by Fire	WIN				
May 21	Cool Boarders	PS2				
May 22	Red Faction	PS2				
May 28	Crazy Taxi 2	DC				
May 29	Shrek: Fairy Tale Freakdown	GBC				
May 30	Bejeweled	WIN				
May 30	Max Steel: Covert Missions	DC				
May 30	Spider-Man 2: The Sinister Six	GBC				
June 11	Castlevania: Circle of the Moon	GBA				
June 11	ChuChu Rocket!	GBA				
June 11	Earthworm Jim	GBA				
June 11	F-Zero: Maximum Velocity	GBA				
June 11	Konami Krazy Racers	GBA				
June 11	Rayman Advance	GBA				
June 11	Super Mario Advance	GBA				
June 14	Atlantis: The Lost Empire	PS1				
June 18	Twisted Metal: Black	PS2				
June 19	Sonic Adventure 2	DC				
June 19	Startopia	WIN				
June 20	Time Crisis: Project Titan	PS1				
June 21	Baldur's Gate II: Throne of Bhaal	WIN				
June 22	Operation Flashpoint: Cold War Crisis	WIN				
June 27	Anachronox	WIN				
June 27	Anarchy Online	WIN				
June 29	Bomberman Tournament	GBA				
June 29	Diablo II: Lord of Destruction	WIN				
June 29	Final Fantasy Chronicles	PS1				
July 1	Tomb Raider: Curse of the Sword	GBC				
July 6	Runaway: A Road Adventure	WIN				
July 8	Dark Angel: Vampire Apocalypse	PS2				
July 10	Gran Turismo 3: A-Spec	PS2				
July 14	Mega Man Legends	WIN				
July 16	Jurassic Park III: The DNA Factor	GBA				
July 17	City Crisis	PS2				
July 19	Final Fantasy X (JP)	PS2				
July 23	Extermination	PS2				
July 23	Max Payne	WIN				
July 28	Rune: Viking Warlord	PS2				
July 30	Pokémon Crystal (NA)	GBC				
July 30	Tweety and the Magic Gems	GBA				
August 1	Golden Sun	GBA				
August 1	Nancy Drew: Treasure in the Royal Tower	WIN				
August 7	WWF Betrayal	GBA				
August 8	Shogun: Total War: Mongol Invasion	WIN				
August 19	Madden NFL 2002	PS1, PS2				
August 20	Armored Core 2: Another Age	PS2				
August 21	Arcanum: Of Steamworks and Magick Obscura	WIN				
August 27	Dave Mirra Freestyle BMX 2	PS2				
August 27	Mario Kart: Super Circuit	GBA				
August 28	ESPN Final Round Golf 2002	GBA				
August 29	Alchemy	WIN				
August 30	Klonoa: Empire of Dreams	GBA				
September 6	Shenmue II	DC				
September 10	Advance Wars	GBA				
September 10	Jurassic Park III: Park Builder	GBA				
September 10	Portal Runner	PS2				
September 11	Madden NFL 2002	GBC				
September 13	Heavy Metal: Geomatrix	DC				
September 13	Ooga Booga	DC				
September 15	Power Rangers Time Force	GBA				
September 17	Arctic Thunder	PS2				
September 17	The World Is Not Enough	GBC				
September 18	Red Faction	WIN				
September 21	SpongeBob SquarePants: SuperSponge	PS1				
September 24	Monster Rancher 3	PS2				
September 24	Phantasy Star Online Version 2	DC				
September 24	Pool of Radiance: Ruins of Myth Drannor	WIN				
September 24	Silent Hill 2	PS2				
September 24	SpongeBob SquarePants: Operation Krabby Patty	WIN				
September 24	SpyHunter	PS2				
September 25	X-Men: Reign of Apocalypse	GBA				
September 26	Bass Strike	PS2				
September 26	Dexter's Laboratory: Deesaster Strikes!	GBA				
September 26	Final Fight One	GBA				
September 26	Kessen II	PS2				
September 30	Ico	PS2				
October 1	NASCAR Thunder 2002	PS1, PS2, XB				
October 1	Scooby-Doo and the Cyber Chase	GBA				
October 1	Time Crisis II	PS2				
October 1	Yanya Caballista: City Skater	PS2				
October 2	Lego Island 2: The Brickster's Revenge	GBA				
October 3	Lego Bionicle	GBA				
October 4	Scooby-Doo and the Cyber Chase	PS1				
October 5	The Wild Thornberrys: Chimp Chase	GBA				
October 8	Castlevania Chronicles	PS1				
October 10	Dark Age of Camelot	WIN				
October 12	Phoenix Wright: Ace Attorney	GBA				
October 15	Batman: Vengeance	WIN, PS2, GCN, XB, GBA				
October 15	Lady Sia	GBA				
October 17	Devil May Cry	PS2				
October 17	Zoo Tycoon	WIN				
October 18	E.T.: Digital Companion	GBC				
October 21	Stronghold	WIN				
October 22	Grand Theft Auto III	PS2				
October 24	Virtua Tennis 2	DC				
October 28	Doom	GBA				
October 28	Tony Hawk's Pro Skater 3	PS1, PS2, GCN				
October 29	Crash Bandicoot: The Wrath of Cortex	PS2, XB, GCN				
October 29	Spyro: Season of Ice	GBA				
October 30	Aliens versus Predator 2	WIN				
October 30	Boxing Fever	GBA				
October 30	Civilization III	WIN				
October 30	Mega Man Xtreme 2	GBC				
October 30	Monsters, Inc. Scream Team	WIN, PS1, PS2				
October 30	Super Street Fighter II Turbo Revival	GBA				
October 31	Mega Man Battle Network	GBA				
October 31	Soul Reaver 2	PS2				
November 1	Ace Combat 04: Shattered Skies	PS2				
November 1	Burnout	PS2				
November 1	Dragon Warrior VII	PS1				
November 1	FIFA Football 2002	PS1, PS2				
November 1	Nancy Drew: The Final Scene	WIN				
November 3	Rocket Power: Dream Scheme	GBA				
November 5	SpongeBob SquarePants: SuperSponge	PS1, GBA				
November 5	SSX Tricky	PS2, GCN, XB				
November 7	Jackie Chan Adventures: Legend of the Dark Hand	GBA				
November 9	Project Gotham Racing	XB				
November 11	Golden Sun	GBA				
November 12	Empire Earth	WIN				
November 12	Gradius Galaxies	GBA				
November 12	Survivor	WIN				
November 13	007: Agent Under Fire	PS2				
November 13	Cubix - Robots for Everyone: Race 'N Robots	GBC				
November 13	Metal Gear Solid 2: Sons of Liberty	PS2				
November 13	Tom Clancy's Ghost Recon	WIN				
November 14	Frank Herbert's Dune	WIN, PS2				
November 14	Harvest Moon 3 GBC	GBC				
November 14	Shrek	XB				
November 15	Cel Damage	XB, PS2, GCN				
November 15	Dead or Alive 3	XB				
November 15	Halo: Combat Evolved	XB				
November 15	Nancy Drew: Message in a Haunted Mansion	GBA				
November 15	Oddworld: Munch's Oddysee	XB				
November 15	Wizardry 8	WIN				
November 16	Harry Potter and the Philosopher's Stone	WIN, PS1, GBC, GBA				
November 16	Headhunter	DC				
November 17	NHL Hitz 2002	GCN				
November 17	Star Wars Rogue Squadron II: Rogue Leader	GCN				
November 18	Crazy Taxi	GCN				
November 18	IL-2 Sturmovik	WIN				
November 18	Luigi's Mansion	GCN				
November 18	Super Monkey Ball	GCN				
November 18	WWF Road to WrestleMania	GBA				
November 19	Soul Reaver 2	WIN				
November 19	Wario Land 4	GBA				
November 19	WWF SmackDown! Just Bring It	PS2				
November 20	Frequency	PS2				
November 20	Frogger: The Great Quest	PS2				
November 20	Return to Castle Wolfenstein	WIN				
November 21	Ecks vs. Sever	GBA				
November 21	Star Wars Episode I: Jedi Power Battles	GBA				
November 21	Super Smash Bros. Melee (JP)	GCN				
November 22	Mr. Driller G (JP)	PS1				
November 23	Gothic	WIN				
November 24	Frogger's Adventures: Temple of the Frog	GBA				
November 25	Azurik: Rise of Perathia	XB				
November 26	Jurassic Park III: Island Attack	GBA				
November 26	Star Wars: Starfighter	XB				
November 26	Twisted Metal: Small Brawl	PS1				
November 27	Extreme-G 3	GCN				
November 27	Lego Racers 2	GBA				
November 28	Cruis'n Velocity	GBA				
November 29	Rampage Puzzle Attack	GBA				
November 30	Dokapon: Monster Hunter	GBA				
December 1	Breath of Fire	GBA				
December 1	M&M's Blast!	GBA				
December 3	Baldur's Gate: Dark Alliance	PS2				
December 3	Jak and Daxter: The Precursor Legacy	PS2				
December 3	Pikmin	GCN				
December 3	Super Smash Bros. Melee (NA)	GCN				
December 4	Mega Man X6	PS1				
December 5	American Bass Challenge	GBA				
December 7	Cel Damage	GCN				
December 7	Evil Twin: Cyprien's Chronicles (EU/PAL)	PS2				
December 7	Magical Vacation	GBA				
December 9	The Flintstones: Big Trouble in Bedrock	GBA				
December 12	Mortal Kombat Advance	GBA				
December 12	Shadow Hearts	PS2				
December 17	Dark Rift (NA)	N64				
December 18	Universal Studios Theme Parks Adventure	GCN				
December 19	Star Wars: Obi-Wan	XB				
December 19	Wizardry: Tale of the Forsaken Land	PS2				
December 20	Final Fantasy X (NA)	PS2				
December 20	Giants: Citizen Kabuto	PS2				
December 21	Silent Hill 2: Director's Cut	XB				
December 21	Ultimate Mortal Kombat 3	GBA				

== Trends ==
=== Video game consoles ===
The dominant video game console in 2001 was Sony's PlayStation 2.

Nintendo released the GameCube on September 14 in Japan (North America on November 18 and in Europe on May 3, 2002). Microsoft released the Xbox in North America on November 15 (in Europe on March 14, 2002).

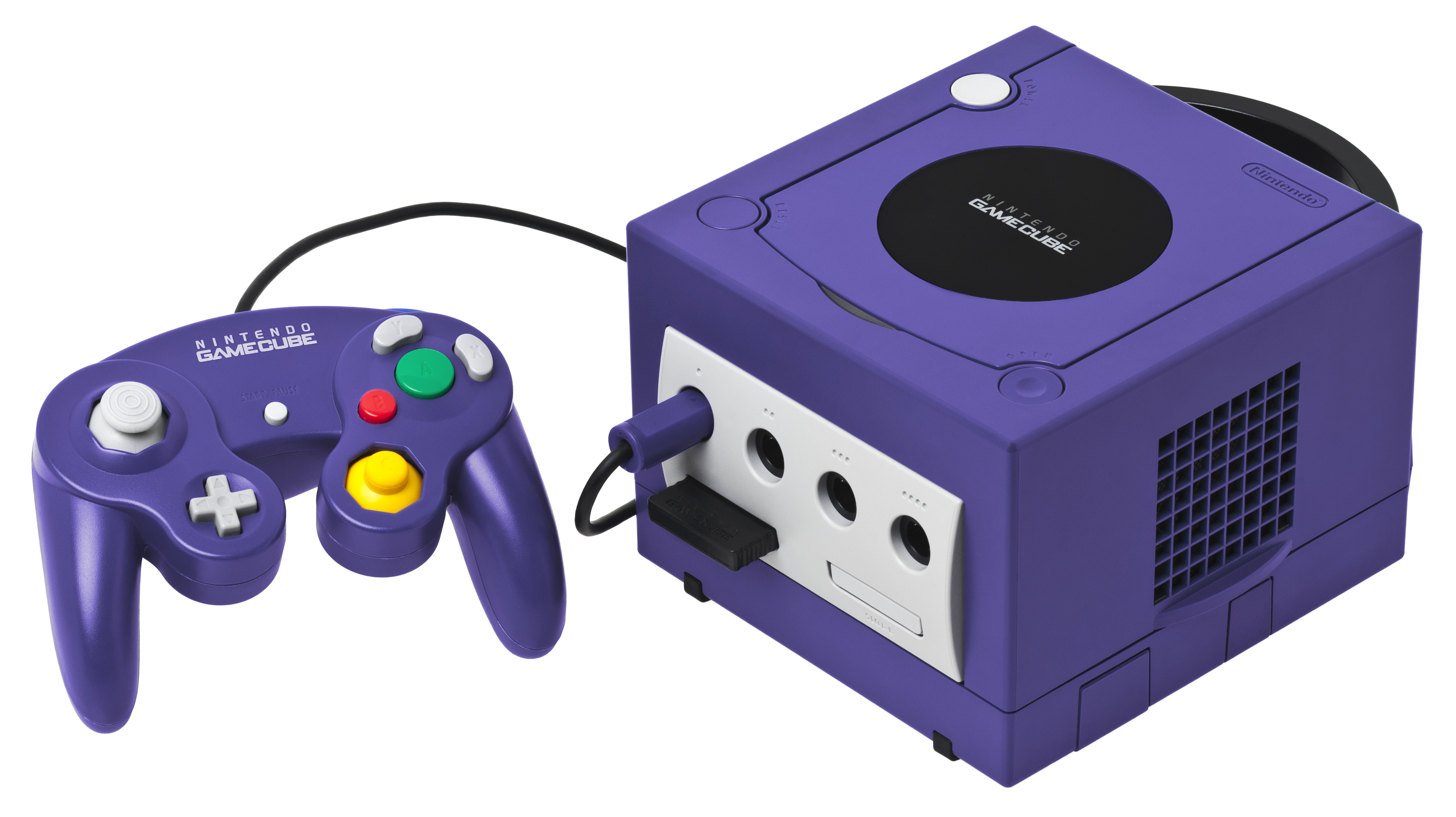
GameCube

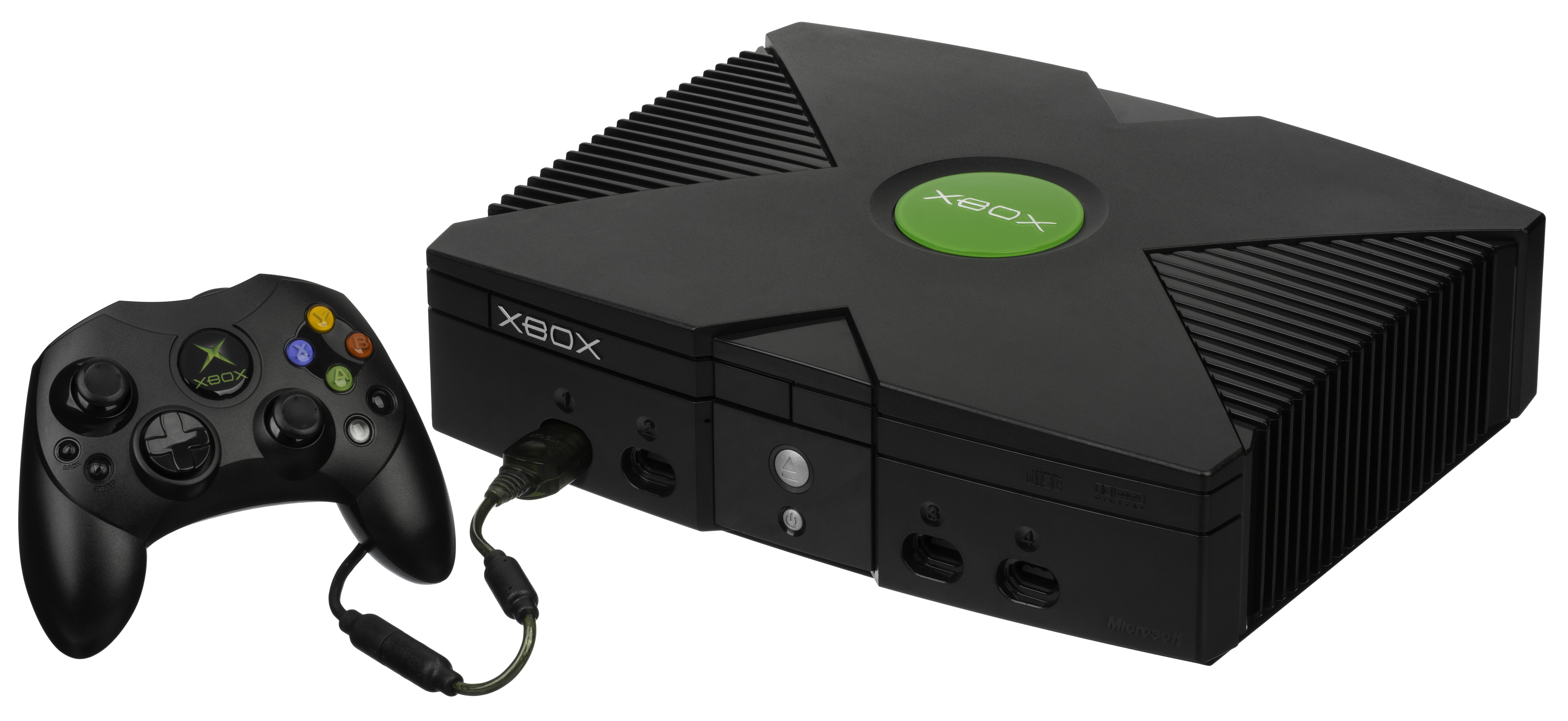
Xbox

=== Handheld game systems ===
The dominant handheld system in 2001 was Nintendo's Game Boy Color.

Nintendo released the Game Boy Advance in Japan on March 21 (in North America on June 11 and Europe on June 22).

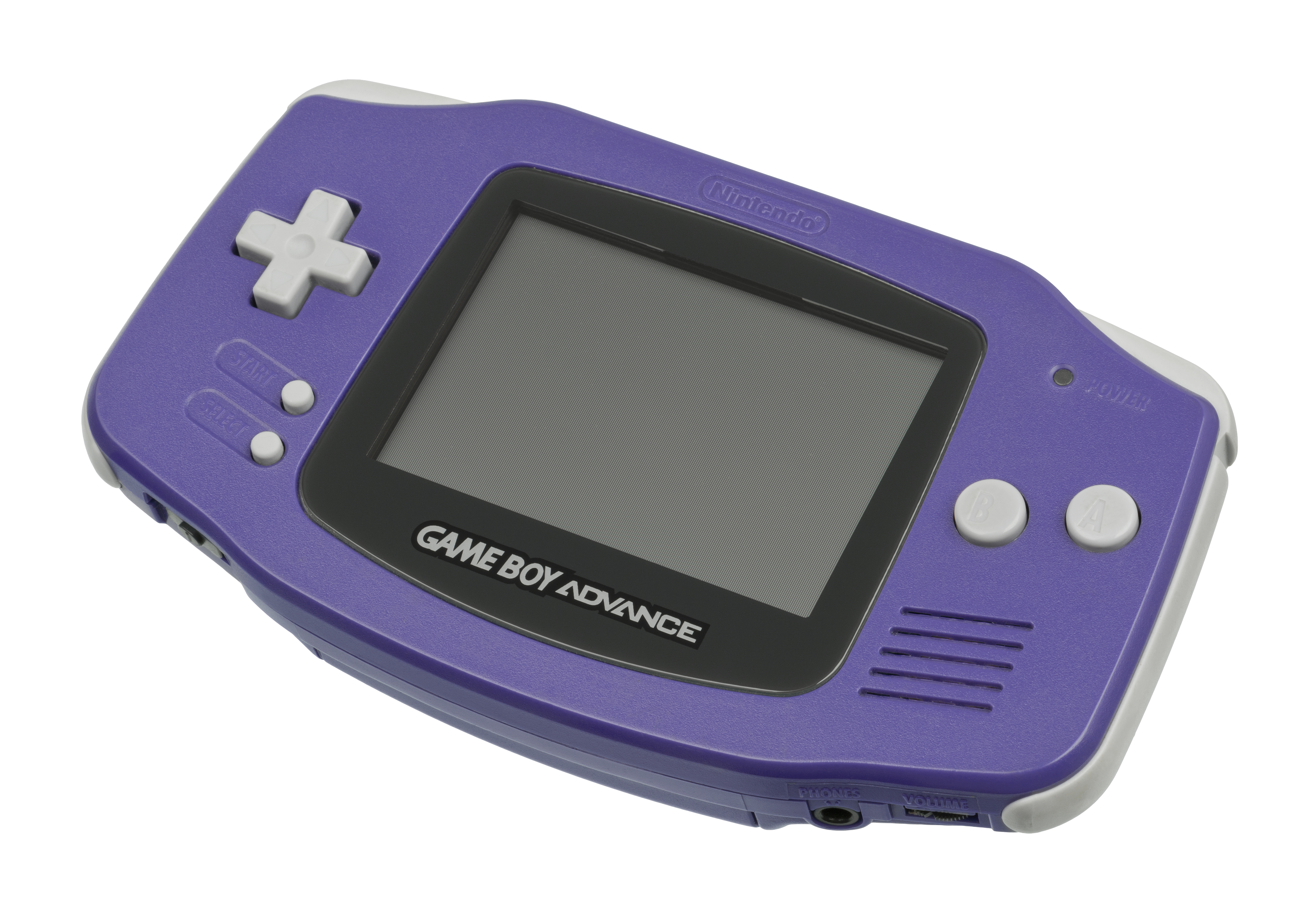
The Game Boy Advance

== Deaths ==
- January 12 - David Pridie, 30, developer on Unreal Tournament.
- March 16 – Isao Okawa, 74, chairman of Sega.
- May 3 - Doug Myers, 36, Audio and Visual production on Railroad Tycoon II.
- September 21 - Andrew Bradfield, 35, creator of Laser Hawk

== See also ==
- 2001 in games
