= Crazy Taxi: Catch a Ride =

2003 video game

- Developer: Graphic State
- Publisher: Sega: NA: THQ
- Series: Crazy Taxi
- Platform: Game Boy Advance
- Release: NA: April 8, 2003; AU: June 13, 2003; EU: August 1, 2003
- Genres: Racing, action
- Mode: Single-player

Crazy Taxi: Catch a Ride is a racing action video game for the Game Boy Advance, part of the Crazy Taxi series. It was developed by Graphic State and published by Sega. This game is an attempt to port the original Crazy Taxi to the Game Boy Advance, featuring two cities (one unlockable), nine Crazy Box minigames and all four cabbies from the original game.

== Gameplay ==
Gameplay of Crazy Taxi: Catch a Ride. One of the few Game Boy Advance games to feature 3D graphics.

The main objective for the player is to make as much money as possible as a cab driver. The player selects one of two cities to play in where they maneuver around the city to find passengers for their cab. Players receive money based on; how fun the trip was for the passenger, hitting jumps within the map, driving close to traffic, drifting and how quickly the cab ride is accomplished. Players can choose from four characters, Axel, B.D. Joe, Gena and Gus. In addition to the main game, nine different mini-games are also available for play. The game also features multiple save slots per cartridge, allowing for the player to save their progress through the game.

== Development and release ==
Crazy Taxi: Catch a Ride was developed by Graphic State. The game was originally announced by THQ in March 2002. Graphic State developed a 3D graphics engine for the game which was named "Rush". One of the biggest challenges for Graphic State was recreating the city environment and traffic on the streets. Due to licensing issues, the game couldn't use any of the music or brands from the original game. The game was first released in the United States on April 8, 2003, and in Europe on August 1. Infogrames distributed the European release for Sega Europe.

== Reception ==
Reception

Aggregate score
Aggregator	Score
Metacritic	48/100

Review scores
Publication	Score
AllGame	2.5/5
Edge	2/10
Eurogamer	4/10
Game Informer	4/10
GameSpy	2/5
GameZone	6.8/10
IGN	6.5/10
Nintendo Power	3/5
X-Play	2/5

As an attempt to port a 3D game to a small handheld system, Crazy Taxi: Catch a Ride received "generally unfavorable reviews" according to video game review aggregator Metacritic, mostly due to visual problems.

In a more forgiving review of the game, IGN awarded it a score of 6.5 out of 10 and wrote: "Crazy Taxi: Catch a Ride is definitely a fun GBA game, but you have to work through the game's blocky graphics and very inconsistent, chuggy framerate". The reviewers also felt the developers needed to use the strengths of the Game Boy Advance to bring the console design to the hand held, "instead of trying to recreate the exact experience in portable form". Chris Hudak of X-Play wrote that the game is "just simply on the jittery, crunchy, slow, and empty side".
