= Crazy Taxi: Fare Wars =

2007 video game

- Developers: Sniper Studios; Black Hole Entertainment
- Publisher: Sega
- Producers: Jeff Hasson (executive); Stephen Frost (associate)
- Series: Crazy Taxi
- Platform: PlayStation Portable
- Release: NA: August 7, 2007; AU: September 27, 2007; EU: September 28, 2007; JP: August 12, 2008
- Genres: Racing, action
- Modes: Single-player, multiplayer

Crazy Taxi: Fare Wars (Note: Known in Japan as Crazy Taxi: Double Punch (Japanese: クレイジータクシー ダブルパンチ, Hepburn: Kureijī Takushī Daburu Panchi)) is a 2007 racing video game developed by Sniper Studios and Black Hole Entertainment, and part of the Crazy Taxi series. A compilation of Crazy Taxi (1999) and Crazy Taxi 2 (2001), Black Hole Entertainment ported the original games from the Dreamcast to the PlayStation Portable, while Sniper Studios added a new multiplayer mode. A new single-player campaign was foregone due to budget and time constraints. In the multiplayer, players compete against one another for customers and fare money. While Crazy Taxi received numerous ports, Fare Wars gained notoriety as the sole port of Crazy Taxi 2 outside of the Dreamcast version. It was released in North America, Australia, and Europe in August and September 2007, followed by a Japanese release in August 2008.

The game received mixed reviews from critics, who praised the gameplay of the original games, while calling it dated, as well as the new multiplayer mode. However, they criticized compromises made to bring the two Dreamcast games to the less powerful PlayStation Portable, such as lower frame rate and longer loading times, the removal of the original games' licensed soundtracks, and control issues. The game's developers noted that they had difficulty in porting the games to such limiting hardware.

== Gameplay ==
The player drives a passenger in their cab to the destination, indicated by the green arrow.

Crazy Taxi: Fare Wars combines the games Crazy Taxi and Crazy Taxi 2, leaving their respective original gameplay intact. In the single-player mode, the player, controlling one of several yellow cab drivers, each with their own unique cab, must drive around the city, picking up passengers and racing recklessly to get them to where they need to go in the fastest time. When each passenger is dropped off, the player earns a fare and extra time on the limited countdown clock, while extra money can be earned by performing stunts.

The ports also carry over the games' minigame modes, Crazy Box and Crazy Pyramid. In the former, players can access nine minigames, including bowling and bursting balloons with their taxi. The latter, while similar, includes minigames that utilize the "Crazy Hop" feature included in the sequel, which allows the taxi to leap through the use of hydraulics.

Fare Wars adds three new multiplayer modes. In Time Trials mode, players can use ad-hoc multiplayer to compete to see who earns the most money within a certain time limit. In C-R-A-Z-Y mode, one player attempts to beat the other player's score for an individual fare, while in the final mode, Head to Head, two players compete to win on the same map. If one player hits the opponent's car, they can steal the passenger from their opponent.

== Development and release ==
Crazy Taxi: Fare Wars was developed through the collaboration of the respective development teams at Sega of America in San Francisco, Sniper Studios in Redwood City, California, and Black Hole Entertainment in Budapest, Hungary. While Sniper Studios handled the multiplayer aspect of the game, the porting was performed by Black Hole. Sniper initially chose to work on Crazy Taxi because it believed the series had "near-perfect gameplay", and wanted to make a true port. As such, they spoke to contacts at Sega, who were looking to bring games from their catalog to PlayStation Portable, and got permission to port the series, believing that it would make "a lot of sense". It also considered multiplayer something that would give the game a new feel. Adding a single-player campaign was considered, but would have cost too much money and been too time-consuming to implement.

The game's developers used the Dreamcast version of the game, running on its original system, for reference purposes. While they initially considered buying an original Crazy Taxi arcade machine from eBay instead, high shipping fees ultimately scuttled the plan.

The creation of the multiplayer mode was considered a challenge, as it required the original games' artificial intelligence (AI) to be modified to support two independently controlled cabs in the same space. This was further hindered by the fact that the AI was only designed to support single-player gameplay, and the developers decided to work around that rather than change it significantly. The developers were ultimately forced to lower the amount of AI traffic in multiplayer as compared to single-player, due to a lack of memory on the PlayStation Portable. While the multiplayer mode was also initially planned to be accessible from the main menu, this resulted in long load times because the single-player mode had to be loaded first from the Universal Media Disc (UMD). Therefore, the multiplayer mode was moved to the in-game menu of the single-player mode.

Load times for the game turned out to be overly long, and frame rate too low, because the development team was not able to test how quickly it loaded off UMD discs until late into the development due to a tight development schedule. They noted that streaming data off a Memory Stick results in a performance increase. Since the custom music player automatically streams data off the Memory Stick, the seek times for the rest of the game improved when using it. Hardware restrictions also meant that, unlike the other versions of the games, which ran at 60 frames per second (FPS), Fare Wars only runs at a maximum of 30 FPS.

The wireless communication for the games was made more robust than normal, as testers had sent feedback about connection interruptions the developers could not reproduce. The development of the game went 13% over the original budget estimate, attributed to attempting to estimate the development cost based on source code that had not been seen yet. Ultimately, while the Crazy Taxi source code was implemented on schedule, the team ran into problems attempting to implement the source code of Crazy Taxi 2. Another difficulty in development was that bugs were not distinctly single-player or multiplayer, due to one's dependence on the other to work.

Many of the real-world stores in the game, including Pizza Hut, Tower Records, and KFC, had their names and logos removed, and the original soundtracks, containing songs by the bands Bad Religion, Methods of Mayhem and The Offspring, were also removed from the game due to licensing issues. The game allows custom soundtracks; MP3 files stored on the memory stick can be played in-game, a decision by the developers to allow "hardcore" fans to play the original tracks if they obtained them themselves.

Crazy Taxi: Fare Wars was released in North America on August 7, 2007. The PAL region version was initially slated for September 7, and after a slight delay was released in Australia and Europe on September 27 and 28, respectively. In Japan, the game was released on August 12, 2008.

== Reception ==
Reception

Aggregate score
Aggregator	Score
Metacritic	64/100

Review scores
Publication	Score
1Up.com	C
Eurogamer	4/10
Game Informer	5.75/10
GameSpot	6/10
GameSpy	4/5
GamesRadar+	3/5
GameZone	7/10
IGN	7.5/10
VideoGamer.com	5/10
Maxim	6/10

The game received an aggregate score of 64/100 from Metacritic, indicating "mixed or average reviews".

Among positive aspects noted by the reviewers were the value of having both games in a single package and how well the original arcade gameplay translated into a portable version. GameZone called the arcade rules mode "perfect for a portable system", since it allowed a player to quickly play before work or school. Critics also praised the multiplayer, with Kurt Kalata of Hardcore Gaming 101 calling it "interesting", as well as "an addition that should have been made in the original Crazy Taxi game", particularly noting that one player can steal the customer of another. Scott Jones of Maxim called it "nifty", while GameSpy stated that it added replay value to the game. Greg Miller of IGN also remarked positively on the game's value, saying that there were many games with "larger price tags and smaller feature lists", and that it brought "something new to the table" that warranted a repurchase. Will Freeman of VideoGamer.com said that "at a budget price point you do get quite a chunk of gaming for your money".

However, the games were criticized both for the lack of graphical improvements in the port, and the introduction of new technical issues related to the limited hardware they ran on. Their graphics, which received little change from the original games, were called dated; Ellie Gibson of Eurogamer called the game's environments "flat and full of pop-up" with "jagged edges everywhere", saying that this was less forgivable than seven years ago, when the game originally released, and summing them up as "dodgy".

One commonly mentioned technical issue in reviews was the speed of the games. Gibson stated that "everything feels incredibly slow", while Greg Sewart of 1Up.com stated that "everything looks like it's moving in relative slow motion". Eric Bratcher of GamesRadar+ concurred, mentioning that the games ran "noticeably" slower than the original Dreamcast versions, saying that, while it may have been intentional, it "saps" the frantic pace of the games. The loading times were also cited as an issue, with Gibson considering them "a problem". The removal of real-world stores and restaurants, and the original soundtrack of Crazy Taxi, was an additional sticking point; Kalata called the omission "weird" and "a little jarring".

Alex Navarro of GameSpot stated that the game "isn't very much fun anymore", also calling the controls "dodgy" and further expounding that, with regards to the controls, "drifting is a pain, and the turning radius on your cab seems decidedly lacking". Matt Bertz of Game Informer concurred, saying that the driving controls were "horrible", and also noting the low draw distance. He concluded by saying that only "die-hard fans" of the original should purchase the game.
