= Crazy Taxi 3: High Roller =

2002 video game

- North American Xbox cover art
- Developer: Hitmaker
- Publisher: Sega
- Series: Crazy Taxi
- Platforms: Xbox; Arcade; Microsoft Windows
- Release: Xbox: NA: July 23, 2002; JP: July 25, 2002; PAL: September 20, 2002; Arcade; 2003; Microsoft Windows: JP: February 26, 2004; EU: 2004
- Genres: Racing, action
- Mode: Single player

Crazy Taxi 3: High Roller is a 2002 racing video game and the third in Sega's Crazy Taxi series. It was originally released for the Xbox, followed by an arcade release under the title Crazy Taxi: High Roller for the Sega Chihiro game board and then a Microsoft Windows release. It expands on the previous two games with an additional location, more taxis, and other features.

High Roller received a 69 out of 100 score at review aggregator Metacritic indicating mixed or average reviews. Critics praised the inclusion of the characters, vehicles and open worlds from the previous two entries, but criticized the game's performance issues.

== Gameplay ==
Crazy Taxi 3 features the environments from the previous two games and a new environment similar to Las Vegas.

Crazy Taxi 3 is a score attack game. The player controls one of several taxi drivers in a fictional city, looking for fares and then taking them to their destination in the fastest time possible. The player must perform this task while time still remains on an overall gameplay clock. Passengers looking for rides are indicated by an overhead marker that is colored to represent the distance to their intended destination. The color marker ranges from red indicating short trips, to yellow for intermediate distances, and to green indicating long ones. When a passenger is picked up, the player is awarded additional time on the countdown time. Furthermore, a second countdown timer is started, representing how quickly the passenger needs to be at their destination. While a passenger is in the taxi, a large green arrow is shown on the player's HUD that points in the general direction of the passenger's destination to help guide the player through the map.

The player can use special "crazy stunt" moves, such as drifts, jumps, and near misses, and consecutive combos of these, to earn extra money from the passenger during the trip. If the destination is reached in time, the player is paid based on distance driven with a possible time bonus based on how quickly the destination was reached. If the passenger's countdown strikes zero, he or she will exit the taxi without paying and the player will be required to look for another fare. The game continues in this mode as long as time remains on the main clock. Once the clock reaches zero, the game is over and the player is ranked and rated based on the total earned.

The player character is able to pick up a party of passengers, each having a different destination. The number of passengers in the car multiplies the tip bonuses earned from stunt driving, while the total fare can only be earned once the last passenger is dropped off in time. The game also features a set of mini-games. Crazy Taxi 3 inherits the tradition of mini-games from the Crazy Taxi series. Crazy X consists of three levels, each testing a different criteria of skills, such as steering and using the Crazy Dash and Crazy Drift.

By completing all of level 1, maps of the locations are available on the menu, which include all the destinations and shortcuts. Completing level 2 will provide the player with three more different types of vehicles to ride on: a stroller and a bike and carriage. Completing level 3 will allow the player to use any cabbie in any map. Prior to each game session, the player can pick one of several drivers and their associated cars; each car/driver has slightly different performance relating to factors, such as speed and turning, that impact the game.

The game consists of three locations, West Coast from Crazy Taxi, Small Apple from Crazy Taxi 2, now set at night, and Glitter Oasis which is a new location for Crazy Taxi 3. Stages are improved graphically and are tightened and updated for full use of the gameplay elements.

== Development ==
Crazy Taxi 3: High Roller was announced in January 2002. Hitmaker had tried to develop an on-line version of Crazy Taxi, to be called Crazy Taxi Next exclusively for the Xbox, which, besides multiplayer game modes, would have included night and day cycles, each with a different set of passengers and destinations, while reusing and graphically updating the maps from Crazy Taxi and Crazy Taxi 2. Ultimately, both multiplayer and day/night cycles were dropped and work on Crazy Taxi Next was transferred to Crazy Taxi 3: High Roller, which included some of the nighttime driving concepts suggested by Next.

In 2003, High Roller was ported to the arcade via the Xbox-based Chihiro system board. The soundtrack for Crazy Taxi 3 features four bands, The Offspring, Bad Religion, Pivit, and Silverbullit. Additional songs for menus and credits are provided by The Offspring, Bad Religion, Pivit, Methods of Mayhem and Brian Setzer. It was released for the Xbox and Microsoft Windows, with also an arcade release under the name Crazy Taxi: High Roller for the Chihiro game board.

== Reception ==
Reception

Aggregate score
Aggregator	Score
Metacritic	69/100

Review scores
Publication	Score
AllGame	3/5
Edge	6/10
Electronic Gaming Monthly	8.33/10
Eurogamer	4/10
Famitsu	8/10, 7/10, 9/10, 8/10
Game Informer	8.5/10
GamePro	4/5
GameRevolution	C
GameSpot	6.9/10
GameSpy	4/5
GameZone	8.7/10
IGN	6.5/10
Official Xbox Magazine (US)	8/10
Entertainment Weekly	C+
Maxim	6/10

The Xbox version received "average" reviews according to video game review aggregator Metacritic. Using Metacritics scoring system, reviews range from a 40% approval by Kirstan Reed of Eurogamer to an 87% approval from Luois Bedigan of GameZone.

IGN's Hilary Goldstein praised the overall gameplay. He noted that newer additions such as the ability to boost and jump provided nuance. He felt that while there were also new gametypes they were not enough to provide necessary innovations to liven gameplay. He felt it either "hasn't aged well, or rather, hasn't been translated well into the latest version." Game Informer's primary reviewer felt that this game was the one in the Crazy Taxi series that players should choose if they only selected one. "Crazy Taxi 3 is a great place to start--it's fast, fun, and easy to learn" said Andrew Park of GameSpot. David Hodgson agreed. He stated the that Crazy Taxi 3: High Roller had "everything from past Taxis handed to me on a silver platter".

One reviewer from Game Informer was disappointed with the graphical performance. They noted the Xbox visuals were "a hair sharper than on Dreamcast, but pop-up problems and chugging run rampant." They conceded that they would prefer High Roller to have its strong gameplay over mediocre visuals. The reviewer who gave a second opinion also noted the game had framerate issues. Andrew Park of GameSpot also found the framerate slowdowns frustrating, but implied this only seemed to happen on the new Glitter Oasis level. Dan Elektro of GamePro shared the same sentiment regarding slowdowns specific to Glitter Oasis. Glitter Oasis was a low point for many critics, including Hilary Goldstein of IGN, who felt the environment was generally flat and boring.
