= Angela Ferraiolo =

American systems artist, author, and filmmaker

Angela Ferraiolo is a systems artist, writer, and filmmaker working with adaptive systems, noise, randomness, & generative processes. Her artwork explores open-endedness, self-organization, morphogenesis, and adaptive processes.

== Early life and education ==
Ferraiolo's BLS is from SUNY-Purchase. She has earned an MFA in Media Arts from Hunter College in New York, an MFA in Electronic Writing from Brown University.

== Life and career ==
She has been a lecturer and a co-chair in visual and studio arts at Sarah Lawrence College, where she founded the computational arts program in new genres. She holds the Mary Griggs Burke Chair in Art and Art History at Saint Lawrence College. Ferraiolo has also been a lecturer for School of X/xCoAx (Weimar).

Ferraiolo was an Electronic Writing Fellow at Brown University from 2009 to 2011. She has also been an artist in residence at the Intelligent Engineering Lab and Soka University (Hachioji, Tokyo).

She has worked for RKO (New York), H20 Studios (Vancouver), Westwood Studios (Las Vegas), and Electronic Arts (Redwood City).

She has lived in New York.

== Works and publications ==
Her work has been shown at the New Museum, in the Terrestrial exhibit for Revolve (North Carolina) in 2018. as well as Nabi Art Center (Seoul), SIGGRAPH (Los Angeles), ISEA (Vancouver, Hong Kong), EVA (London), xCoAx (Madrid, Milan), Art Machines 2 (Hong Kong), New York Film Festival (New York), Courtisane Film Festival (Ghent), Australian Experimental Film Festival (Melbourne), the International Conference of Generative Art (Rome, Florence) as well as Expanded Arts and La Mama Galleria in New York, and at the Brick Playhouse in Philadelphia. Other exhibit places include Microscope Gallery (Bushwick), New York Film Festival (New York), Courtisane (Ghent), AWXFF (New York), Collectìf Jeune Cinema (Paris), and the Australian Experimental Film Festival (Melbourne), as well as the International Conference of Generative Art (Rome), and the International Conference of Computer Graphics, Imaging and Visualization (Taiwan).

Her generative videos have screened at the Australian International Experimental Film Festival, Melbourne, Views from the Avant-Garde at the New York Film Festival, and the Collectif Jeune Cinema, Paris.

Ferraiolo is the writer and narrative designer of video games:

- Aidyn Chronicles (2001) is an early fantasy game.
- Earth and Beyond (2002) is one of the first online massive multiplayers.
- A Beautiful Room tells the stories of occult interior designers.
- Follow This is a playable movie for mobile devices.
- Subway (2011) produces generative video montages by using RiTa.
- Mad Traffic! (2017) is an interactive artwork with patterns created from everyday noises and was shown at the City Arts Factory in Orlando, Florida, in 2017 as part of Art in Odd Places.
- The Knife Cuts Two Ways (2017) is an art piece that uses bright colors and repeating patterns to engage readers in multiple distances and was included artists for the University of Mary Washington in 2017.
- The Regeneration of the Earth After Its Destruction by the Capitalist Powers (2019) is a systems artwork that simulates life after an extinction and was shown at the XXII Generative Art Conference and 7th Conference on Computation Communication Aesthetics & X 2019.
- Two Synthetic Gardens (2020) portrays digital landscapes tied to characters and was shown at the XXIII Generative Art Conference.
- Zebra: Threat and Response in a Dynamical Artwork (2022) uses zebras as agents to move in a landscape where they encounter noise and threats and was shown at the XXV Generative Art Conference.
