= Crazy Taxi (video game) =

1999 video game

- Dreamcast cover art for Europe and Japan
- Developer: Sega AM3 (Note: Ported to PlayStation 2 and GameCube by Acclaim Studios Cheltenham. Ported to Windows by Strangelite and ported to PlayStation 3 and Xbox 360 by Sega China. The GameCube, PS2 and original PC versions were developed in association with Hitmaker.)
- Publisher: Sega (Note: The PlayStation 2 and GameCube versions were published by Acclaim Entertainment in all regions excluding Japan. The Windows version was published by Activision Value in North America and Empire Interactive in Europe.)
- Director: Kenji Kanno
- Producer: Hisao Oguchi
- Programmer: Masaaki Ito
- Artist: Mitsuhiko Kakita
- Series: Crazy Taxi
- Platforms: Arcade; Dreamcast; PlayStation 2; GameCube; Windows; PlayStation 3; Xbox 360; iOS; Android
- Release: February 1999: Arcade; JP: February 1999; NA: February 1999 Dreamcast; JP: January 27, 2000; NA: February 2, 2000; EU: February 25, 2000 PlayStation 2; NA: May 17, 2001; EU: June 1, 2001; JP: November 22, 2001 GameCube; NA: November 18, 2001; EU: May 3, 2002; JP: May 30, 2002 Windows; EU: June 28, 2002; JP: September 26, 2002; NA: September 30, 2002 PlayStation 3; NA: November 16, 2010; EU: November 17, 2010; JP: November 24, 2010 Xbox 360; WW: November 24, 2010 iOS; WW: October 10, 2012 Android; WW: July 10, 2013
- Genres: Racing, action
- Mode: Single-player
- Arcade system: Sega NAOMI

Crazy Taxi (Note: Japanese: クレイジータクシー, Hepburn: Kureijī Takushī) is a racing video game developed and published by Sega. It is the first game in the Crazy Taxi series. In the game, players are tasked with picking up taxi customers and driving to their destination as quickly as possible. It was first released in arcades in 1999 then ported to other consoles starting with the Sega Dreamcast in 2000.

The game received generally positive reviews across most versions, with the Dreamcast port garnering critical acclaim. Critics praised its difficulty curve and the gameplay as "addictive". Reception to the implementation of the soundtrack was more mixed. In retrospect, Crazy Taxi has been regarded as one of the greatest video games of all time. It became one of the few Sega All Stars on the Dreamcast and earned Greatest Hits and Player's Choice status on PlayStation 2 and GameCube respectively. The game has been rereleased numerous times, and was featured on the Dreamcast Collection in 2011. The core gameplay of Crazy Taxi has inspired other games and numerous clones. The game's success on consoles prompted Sega to continue the series, starting with Crazy Taxi 2 in 2001.

== Gameplay ==
In Crazy Taxi players are tasked with earning fares by taking customers to destinations as quickly as possible.

The main objective of the game is to pick up customers and take them to their chosen destination as quickly as possible. Along the way, money can be earned by performing stunts, such as near misses with other vehicles. The player is directed to a destination by a large green arrow at the top of the screen. The arrow does not adjust based on obstacles but rather points in the general direction of the destination. Once the player arrives near the destination, they must stop within a specified zone. When the destination is reached, the customer's fare is added to the player's total money earned. Ratings are awarded depending on how long the player took to complete the journey. If the customer's timer runs out before the player reaches the destination, the customer will jump from the taxi without paying the driver.

Players can select three-, five-, or ten-minute settings, or the Arcade Rules used in the original coin-op version. In the three time-limited settings, play continues for the designated period of time, after which the cab automatically stops and no more points can be scored. Under Arcade Rules, the player starts with an initial time limit of one minute, which can be extended through time bonuses earned for quick deliveries. Console versions of the game also feature a mode known as Crazy Box, a set of minigames that feature challenges, such as picking up and dropping off a number of customers within a time limit, bowling using the taxi as a ball, and popping giant balloons in a field.

The arcade version includes one stage, and an additional "Original" stage was added for the console versions. Both stages are based in sunny coastal Californian locales, with steep hills and other similarities to San Francisco. The player has a choice of four drivers (Axel, B.D. Joe, Gena, and Gus) and their cabs, each of which has slightly different attributes.

== Development and marketing ==
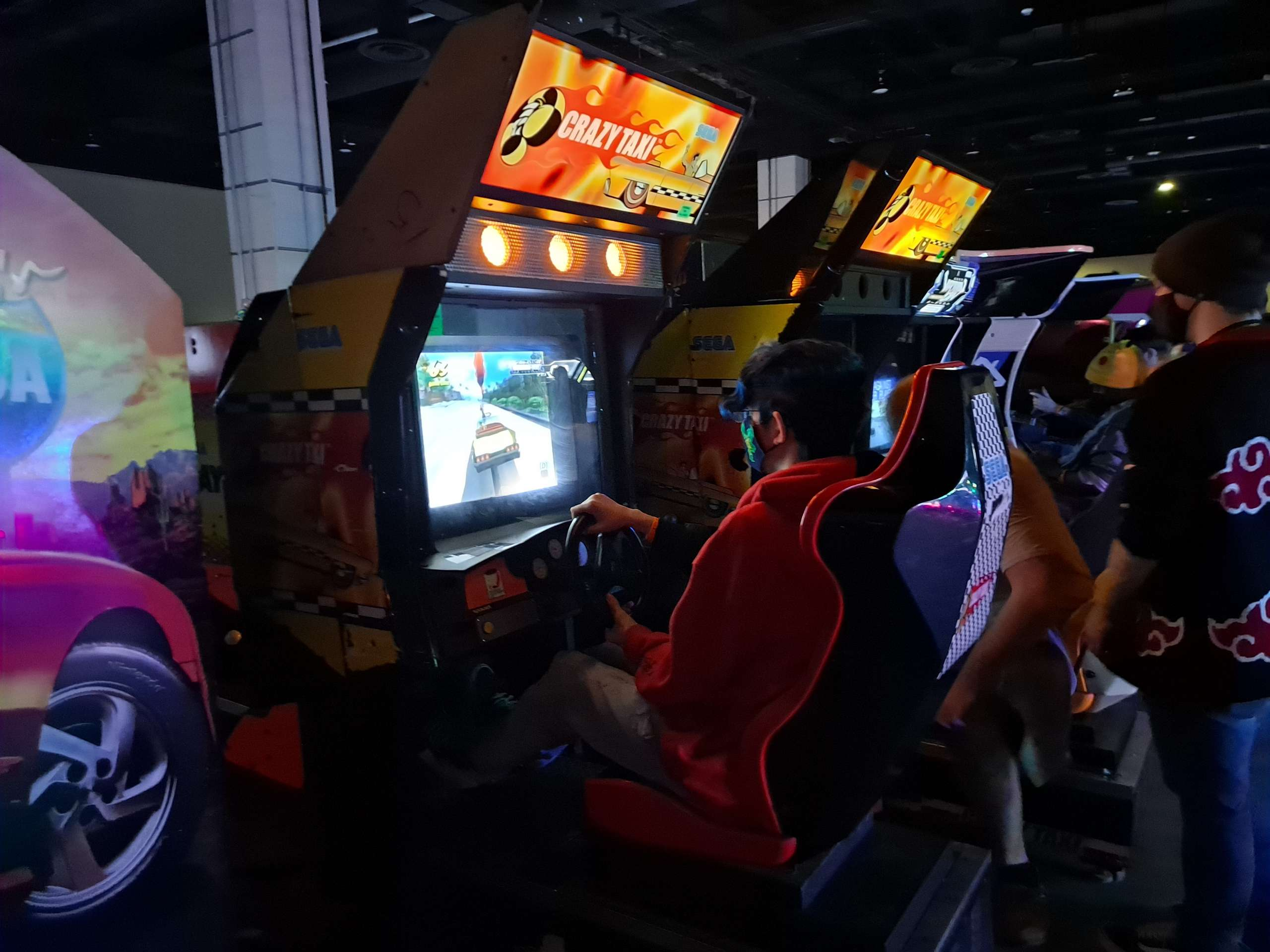
A man playing on a Crazy Taxi arcade cabinet at MAGFest 2023

The arcade edition of the game was developed by Hitmaker as a variation from then-current arcade titles. The Crazy Taxi cabinet ran on Sega Naomi hardware. It was originally released in arcades as a sit-down machine. An upright version was later released. Over the next few years, the game was ported to the Dreamcast, GameCube, PlayStation 2, and Windows; the latter port was published by Empire Interactive and developed by their internal studio Strangelite. Crazy Taxi was ported to PlayStation 3 and Xbox 360. These ports originally were to force a 4:3 aspect ratio, with widescreen monitors showing blue bars on either side of the screen, resulting in featuring full widescreen support for these ports. The game is a port of the Dreamcast version, including both the original arcade and the Dreamcast-exclusive level. The PlayStation 3 port was released on November 16, 2010, while the Xbox 360 version was released the following week.

Crazy Taxi was brought to the App Store on iOS devices in October 2012. The game includes the arcade map and the map that was introduced for consoles. It includes all Crazy Box challenges. As in the console versions, if all challenges are completed, a pedicab is unlocked to play the main game with. The taxi can be controlled though either the touch screen or by tilting the device making use of its accelerometer. Critics were impressed with this port because the maps remained unchanged and the controls were intuitive.

Sega applied for and was awarded U.S. Patent 6,200,138 – "Game display method, moving direction indicating method, game apparatus and drive simulating apparatus" – in 2001. The mechanics in the "138 patent" describe an arcade cabinet similar to Sega's previous arcade game Harley-Davidson & L.A. Riders (1997) but also describe the arrow navigation system and pedestrian avoidance aspects that were used in Crazy Taxi.

Crazy Taxi producer Kenji Kanno noted that the time extension on gameplay was a breakaway of the current "100 yen for three minutes" that persisted at the time for arcade games, and it rewarded players with longer playing times by performing well in the game. In addition to providing a game that could be played in short sessions, Kanno wanted a game to explore the "daily life and routine" of a taxi driver. In the development of the Dreamcast version of the original arcade game, the developers included a larger map in addition to the arcade one, as to create a feeling of "being lost" and allowing home console players to have fun "learning the town". Mini-games were developed for this version as to "let the player play longer if he improved skill" by offering challenges that were both fun and educational. Over one hundred different ideas for mini-games were developed by the team, but then pared down for the Crazy Box mini-game challenges for the game.

Crazy Taxi is notable for its soundtrack featuring the bands Bad Religion and The Offspring, who provided all of the tracks for the arcade, Dreamcast, PlayStation 2 and GameCube ports. The PC featured a new soundtrack, omitting the original bands in favor of music from Pivit, Too Rude and Total Chaos. The PlayStation 3 and Xbox 360 versions of Crazy Taxi exclude the original bands, providing an original soundtrack for the ports. Custom soundtracks can be used on the PlayStation 3 and Xbox 360 via their system firmware. The iOS and Android versions feature the original soundtrack.

In addition to generic destinations, such as the city's police station, rail terminal and lookout point, passengers may request to be taken to Pizza Hut, Tower Records, the FILA sportswear store, the Levi's store or KFC. Each of these chains are modeled as a location in the game. This is considered one of the most prominent examples of product placement in video gaming history. These establishments have been replaced with generic businesses in later versions, due to licensing difficulties.

In the United States, Sega of America organised a nationwide Crazy Taxi competition for the Dreamcast, with approximately 500 qualifying events held between May and December 2000. The championship attracted an estimated 50,000 to 100,000 participants. On 9 April 2001, 19-year-old University of Illinois student Lindsay Gall won the championship, becoming the first female winner of Sega's Dreamcast Championship. Later that month, video game record-keeping organisation Twin Galaxies announced a separate worldwide Crazy Taxi championship encompassing the Dreamcast, PlayStation 2 and arcade versions. The competition accepted videotaped high-score submissions from 3 May to 2 July 2001, with more than 200 championship titles planned across different categories.

== Reception ==
Reception

Aggregate scores
Aggregator	Score			
Aggregator	Dreamcast	GameCube	PC	PS2
GameRankings	90%	70%	56%	79%
Metacritic	N/A	69/100	N/A	80/100

Review scores
Publication	Score			
Publication	Dreamcast	GameCube	PC	PS2
AllGame	4.5/5	3.5/5	N/A	4/5
Electronic Gaming Monthly	36.5/40	N/A	N/A	8/10
Famitsu	34/40	N/A	N/A	30/40
Game Informer	8.75/10	7.5/10	N/A	8.25/10
GameFan	96%	N/A	N/A	N/A
GamePro	5/5	4/5	N/A	4.5/5
GameRevolution	B+	C	N/A	C+
GameSpot	8.7/10	4.9/10	5.4/10	7.8/10
GameSpy	9/10	83%	N/A	80%
GameZone	N/A	9/10	N/A	9.5/10
IGN	9.6/10	6.9/10	N/A	7.1/10
Next Generation	4/5	N/A	N/A	4/5
Nintendo Power	N/A	3.3/5	N/A	N/A
Official U.S. PlayStation Magazine	N/A	N/A	N/A	4/5
PC Gamer (US)	N/A	N/A	40%	N/A
The Cincinnati Enquirer	3.5/4	N/A	N/A	N/A

Award
Publication	Award
Electronic Gaming Monthly	Game of the Month

Re-releases

Aggregate score
Aggregator	Score		
Aggregator	iOS	PS3	Xbox 360
Metacritic	78/100	60/100	59/100

Review scores
Publication	Score		
Publication	iOS	PS3	Xbox 360
Eurogamer	N/A	3/10	3/10
GamePro	N/A	N/A	3.5/5
GameZone	N/A	N/A	7/10
IGN	7.1/10	6/10	6/10
Official Xbox Magazine (US)	N/A	N/A	6.5/10
The Escapist	N/A	N/A	4/5
TouchArcade	4/5	N/A	N/A

In Japan, Game Machine listed Crazy Taxi on their April 1, 1999 issue as being the second most-successful arcade game of the month. It went on to be the biggest hit from Sega's Hitmaker studio.

Sales for the game were generally high, with the Dreamcast version being the second highest selling Dreamcast game in the United States in 2000, selling nearly 750,000 units. American sales later reached 2.2 million units across the Dreamcast and PlayStation 2, including 1.11 million for the Dreamcast and 1.07 million for the PS2. In the UK, the Dreamcast version was reported to have sold out. In Germany, the Dreamcast version topped Media Control's Dreamcast sales chart in March and April 2000. In Spain, Crazy Taxi topped the Dreamcast sales chart at video game retailer Centro Mail, according to the April 2000 issue of Revista Oficial Dreamcast. The game also debuted at second place in the magazine's reader popularity rankings, behind Soulcalibur.

The PlayStation 2 version received a "Platinum" sales award from the Entertainment and Leisure Software Publishers Association (ELSPA), indicating sales of at least 300,000 copies in the United Kingdom. In Japan, the Dreamcast, PS2 and GameCube versions sold 155,714 units. Xbox Live Arcade sales for 2011 were high, with the game selling nearly 100,000 units.

The Dreamcast version of Crazy Taxi was critically acclaimed, averaging 90% at video game aggregate site GameRankings based on 37 reviews. Subsequent ports of the game have also received generally positive reviews, but had a trend of declining average scores. The PlayStation 2 port averaged 79% at GameRankings and 80/100 at Metacritic respectively. The next port for the GameCube scored lower, with aggregate scores of 70% and 69/100. The PC port was the poorest rated of the ports, scoring an average of 56% at GameRankings.

Critics generally praised the overall gameplay. Brandon Justice of IGN said: "I can't stress enough how addictive this game is". Of the Dreamcast port, Game Revolution felt that "a great arcade game became a good home game". They further noted the game's high difficulty and added that while the game was difficult, it was not frustrating. Michael Goncalves of PALGN added that the game was either a "love or hate" title, adding "if you love it, you will cherish the game and play it to your hearts content". Goncalves also pointed out that the game featured occasional pop up and clipping. Reviews were split across the releases in regards to the game's soundtrack. PALGN cited Bad Religion and The Offspring as a high point of the game, while Game Revolution felt that the tracks were repetitive. GameSpot reviewer Jeff Gerstmann felt that the soundtrack was subjective to personal preference, stating "you'll either want to crank the volume up or turn the music all the way down". In a review for the PC version's altered soundtrack, fellow GameSpot reviewer Andrew Park felt that the new music was fitting for the game. However, they criticized the PC version for frame rate issues and recommended the Dreamcast version instead.

James Bottorff of The Cincinnati Enquirer gave the Dreamcast version three-and-a-half stars out of four and wrote that "the only bug on Crazy Taxi's window is the lack of longevity. The game can grow tiresome after multiple plays. However, the amount of fun packed into its short life span makes it a worthwhile addition to your library of games". Maxim gave the same version a score of six out of ten: "We don't like how the pesky pedestrians always manage to dodge your cab, but the graphics of the San Francisco-like city are amazingly detailed". In Japan, Famitsu gave the Dreamcast version a score of 34 out of 40, and the PS2 version 30 out of 40. GameFan gave the Dreamcast version a score of 96%, while Edge gave both the Dreamcast and PS2 versions a score of seven out of 10.

Hilary Goldstein in IGN called the Xbox Live Arcade release "a mad dash of fun", adding "there's almost no depth to Crazy Taxi, but that's just fine". Goldstein praised the fact that the port stayed true to the original source, but felt that the lack of the original soundtrack "kills half the reason to pick Crazy Taxi up again". Criticism also pointed to the lack of visual updates such as higher resolution models and textures. GamePro's Dave Rudden also lauded the fact that the port played faithfully to the original. Rudden echoed Goldstein's comments in regards to poor visuals, saying it had "ugly character models and boxy traffic cars".

Robert Workman from GameZone praised the game for sticking to its Sega roots: "Crazy Taxi isn't just a nostalgic trip, but also a wondrous stress reliever and an all-around entertaining game". Russ Pitts of The Escapist gave it four stars out of five: "In spite of dated graphics and other technical whizbangery, Crazy Taxi will remind you why you love driving games – and who started that fire. It's a game that's fun to play in short bursts that will become longer and longer the more of them you devote to it". In contrast, Daniel Feit of Wired gave it a score of six stars out of ten: "Gameplay is pure repetition; fun in short bursts but little lasting attraction".

Jeff Lundrigan and Daniel Erickson reviewed the Dreamcast and PlayStation 2 versions for Next Generation, respectively, and each gave their games four stars out of five: "A strangely addictive experience overall, Crazy Taxi is perfect for the gaming obsessive, but also makes a great party game". Erickson described it as "a near-perfect port of a fantastic game".

The Dreamcast version was a runner-up GameSpot's annual "Best Driving Game" award among console games, losing to Test Drive Le Mans.

During the 3rd Annual Interactive Achievement Awards, Crazy Taxi won "Console Action Game of the Year"; it also received nominations for "Console Game of the Year" and "Outstanding Achievement in Game Play Engineering".

=== Legacy ===
Crazy Taxi's success prompted Sega to produce multiple sequels. In 2001, Crazy Taxi 2 was released, followed by Crazy Taxi 3: High Roller in 2002. THQ would publish the Graphic State developed Crazy Taxi: Catch a Ride in 2003, the only title for the Game Boy Advance. Crazy Taxi: Fare Wars, a compilation of Crazy Taxi and Crazy Taxi 2, was released in 2007 for the PlayStation Portable. A mobile-exclusive entry to the series, titled Crazy Taxi: City Rush, was released on the iOS and Google Play app stores in 2014. Crazy Taxi: World Tour will be released for the PlayStation 5, Xbox Series X|S, Nintendo Switch 2 and PC in 2027.

Crazy Taxi and its sequels have also prompted several games which clone its core gameplay. The Simpsons: Road Rage was the first of these titles, released in 2001. In 2003, Sega filed a lawsuit against Fox Interactive, Electronic Arts, and Radical Entertainment. Sega claimed that the game was a patent infringement of Crazy Taxi. The case, Sega of America, Inc. v. Fox Interactive, et al., was settled in private for an undisclosed amount. The poorly received Emergency Mayhem for the Wii utilizes the same core gameplay of the Crazy Taxi series but adds additional elements in regards to driving emergency response vehicles.

Team6 Game Studios would later release a similar game called Taxi Chaos, which could be considered as a spiritual successor to Crazy Taxi. The game was released on February 23, 2021, for the PlayStation 4, Nintendo Switch, and Xbox One. The game takes place in a fictionalized version of New York City and has the same format as the original Crazy Taxi games.

=== Film adaptation ===
In 2001, Richard Donner was attached to a live-action version of Crazy Taxi but eventually left the project. Shortly after, Mindfire Entertainment acquired the rights to a Crazy Taxi movie in 2002, with a then-expected release date in mid-2003. However, the project was quietly canceled at an unknown date. Talk of a screen adaptation of Crazy Taxi was renewed in 2014, as Sega optioned the film and TV rights to its library. In 2026, Netflix announced multiple projects made in partnership with Sega, which includes a Crazy Taxi movie. The film will be written by Dan Gregor and Doug Mand, with Original Film producing.
