= Crazy Taxi 2 =

2001 video game

- Japanese Dreamcast cover art
- Developer: Hitmaker
- Publisher: Sega
- Director: Kenji Kanno
- Producer: Kenji Kanno
- Artist: Takeo Iwase
- Series: Crazy Taxi
- Platform: Dreamcast
- Release: JP: May 13, 2001; NA: May 29, 2001; EU: July 6, 2001
- Genres: Racing, action
- Mode: Single player

Crazy Taxi 2 (クレイジータクシー2) is a 2001 racing video game and the second installment of the Crazy Taxi series. It was originally released for the Dreamcast, and was later ported to the PSP as part of Crazy Taxi: Fare Wars in 2007. It is the last Crazy Taxi game to be released for the Dreamcast after the console was discontinued in March 2001.

Crazy Taxi 2 introduced several new features not found in the original, including two new cities, "Around Apple" and "Small Apple", both somewhat based on New York City. The new cities share four new drivers as default, bringing the total playable characters to eight.

== Gameplay ==
The gameplay is very similar to the original Crazy Taxi, and centers around picking people up at destinations which are highlighted with colored rings, and dropping them off at stated destinations.

Unlike its predecessor, Crazy Taxi 2 allows the player to carry multiple passengers. The game also saw the introduction of the "Crazy Hop" feature, which allows the player to jump over certain surfaces to save time, as they ferry taxi passengers around the locations. By performing moves such as the "Crazy Hop" and the "Crazy Dash", the driver accumulates tips from their passengers, which increases the total score.

Each customer will have a different color appear above him or her with money sign according to the color. Green means long distance, yellow means mid range and red means short distance. The longer the distance, the more money the player can earn. There is a time limit when driving each customer to the destination. If the time limit expires before reaching the destination, the customer will jump out of the cab. The game has no restriction on players aside from a time limit, allowing players to drive as fast and as recklessly as they wish.

This sequel includes a modified soundtrack with rock bands The Offspring and Methods of Mayhem. The game also has some online modes in the form of a scoreboard, and replay-sharing. There are some unlockable items and maps for which players need to beat mini games to unlock.

== Reception ==
Reception

Aggregate score
Aggregator	Score
Metacritic	82/100

Review scores
Publication	Score
AllGame	4.5/5
Edge	8/10
Electronic Gaming Monthly	8.5/10, 8.5/10, 8/10, 8/10
EP Daily	7.5/10
Famitsu	9/10, 9/10, 8/10, 9/10
Game Informer	8.75/10
GameRevolution	B
GameSpot	8.6/10
GameSpy	8.5/10
IGN	8.8/10
Next Generation	4/5
X-Play	4/5
The Cincinnati Enquirer	4/5
Maxim	4/5

The game received "favorable" reviews according to video game review aggregator Metacritic. Jeff Lundrigan of NextGen said, "If you liked the original—and really, who didn't?—there's just as much to like here." Michael "Major Mike" Weigand of GamePro said, "CT2 had some lofty expectations to meet, but its new innovations and features aren't worth the sticker price. The game is hardly a lemon, it just can't quite make it off the test-drive rental lot." (Note: GamePro gave the game 4.5/5 for graphics, 4/5 for sound, and two 3.5/5 scores for control and fun factor.)

The game was nominated at The Electric Playground's 2001 Blister Awards for the "Dreamcast Game of the Year" award, but lost to both NFL 2K2 and NBA 2K2 (tie).

The game received a sequel, Crazy Taxi 3: High Roller, in 2002.
