= Survivor: The Interactive Game =

2001 video game

Survivor
- Developer: Magic Lantern
- Publisher: Infogrames
- Series: Survivor
- Platform: PC
- Release: November 12, 2001
- Genre: Adventure game

Survivor: The Interactive Game, also simply known as Survivor, is a 2001 adventure video game for the PC, based on the American version of the TV series Survivor. Developed by Magic Lantern, it was published by Infogrames on November 12, 2001. It allows players to play as any of the original Borneo or Australian Outback cast members. The game also includes a character creation system for making custom characters.

== Gameplay ==
Gameplay consists of choosing survivors' skills (fishing, cooking, etc.), forming alliances, developing relationships with other tribe members, and voting off competitors at tribal council.

== Reception ==
In the United States, the computer version of Survivor sold 260,000 copies and earned $4.0 million by August 2006, after its release in November 2001. It was the country's 77th-best-selling computer game between January 2000 and August 2006. The game was received very poorly by critics. It has a Metacritic score of 26% based on 7 critic reviews.

GameSpot gave the game a 'Terrible' score of 2.0 out of 10, saying "If you're harboring even a tiny urge to buy this game, please listen very carefully to this advice: Don't do it." Likewise, IGN gave the game a 'Terrible' 2.4 out of 10, stating "It is horribly boring and repetitive. The graphics are weak and even the greatest Survivor fan would break the CD in two after playing it for 20 minutes." The game was the recipient of Game Revolution's lowest score of all time, an F−. An 'interactive review' was created especially for the game, and it features interactive comments like "The Survival periods are about as much fun as" followed by a drop-down menu, "watching paint dry/throbbing hemorrhoids/staring at air/being buried alive."
