= Scooby-Doo and the Cyber Chase (video game) =

2001 Scooby-Doo video game

- North American PlayStation cover art
- Developers: Art Co., Ltd (PS); Software Creations (GBA)
- Publisher: THQ
- Composer: Stephen Geering
- Platforms: PlayStation, Game Boy Advance
- Release: NA: October 2, 2001; EU: December 7, 2001
- Genre: Platformer
- Mode: Single-player

Scooby-Doo and the Cyber Chase is a Scooby-Doo video game based on the Warner Brothers film Scooby-Doo and the Cyber Chase. The game was released for the PlayStation and Game Boy Advance in 2001. The PlayStation version became a "Greatest Hits" title in 2003.

== Plot ==
Scooby-Doo and the gang find themselves in cyberspace. A new villain called the Phantom Virus must be stopped. Scooby and Shaggy must go through various levels to defeat him and his evil villains. Along the way, they collect Scooby Snacks for points, Scooby and Shaggy coins for extra chances, Scooby dog tags for checkpoints, hamburgers for health/energy, and pies for weapons. Fred, Daphne, and Velma give Scooby and Shaggy important game playing moves and tips via Velma's handheld communication device to help them avoid obstacles.

== Gameplay ==
=== PlayStation version ===
The player controls Scooby-Doo and Shaggy in a 3D environment. The player defeats bosses, and tracks down Scooby snacks and other pick-ups. The main goal of the game is to defeat the Phantom Virus, a computer virus that has been terrorizing video games. The game consists of 7 stages and 21 levels in total. Each stage consists of two normal levels and a boss level.

The Game Boy Advance version features six levels and uses a password feature rather than a save feature.

== Reception ==
Reception

Aggregate score
Aggregator	Score	
Aggregator	GBA	PS
GameRankings	60%	61.67%

Review scores
Publication	Score	
Publication	GBA	PS
AllGame	N/A	3/5
IGN	3.5/10	N/A
Jeuxvideo.com	N/A	6/20
Nintendo Power	3/5	N/A
Official U.S. PlayStation Magazine	N/A	2/5

GameRankings gave the PlayStation version a score of 61.67% and the Game Boy Advance version a score of 60%.

Jennifer Beam of AllGame, who praised the PlayStation version for its sound effects and voice acting, wrote, "Relatively decent 3D graphics enhance this game, but almost every area has a level where shadows are indistinguishable from pitfalls."

Hilary Goldstein of IGN reviewed the Game Boy Advance version. Goldstein praised the animation and the music but criticized the sound effects and the password feature, as well as the ending for not having enough "Scooby flavor," writing that, "No masks are removed and Velma doesn't spout off some long-winded explanation of how the culprit pulled off his evil machinations."

The PlayStation version received a "Platinum" sales award from the Entertainment and Leisure Software Publishers Association (ELSPA), indicating sales of at least 300,000 copies in the United Kingdom.

In 2010, Steven Jackson of Retro Gamer called the PlayStation version one of the best Scooby-Doo games ever, despite similarities with the PlayStation game Crash Bandicoot.
