= Bass Strike =

2001 video game

- European PlayStation 2 cover art
- Developer: Pai Inc.
- Publisher: THQ
- Platform: PlayStation 2
- Release: NA: October 4, 2001; EU: December 7, 2001; AU: December 14, 2001
- Genre: Sports
- Mode: Single-player

Bass Strike, often stylized as BASS Strike, is a fishing video game for the PlayStation 2 platform, released in 2001. In Japan, Capcom and Pai Corporation published and distributed the game.

== Reception ==
Reception

Aggregate score
Aggregator	Score
Metacritic	57/100

Review scores
Publication	Score
Consoles +	40%
Famitsu	26/40
Game Informer	7/10
GameSpot	5.1/10
GameZone	7/10
IGN	6.2/10
PlayStation Official Magazine – UK	4/10
Official U.S. PlayStation Magazine	1.5/5
Playboy	80%

The game received "mixed" reviews according to the review aggregation website Metacritic. In Japan, where the game was ported and published by Capcom on February 14, 2002, Famitsu gave it a score of 26 out of 40.
