= Aidyn Chronicles: The First Mage =

2001 video game

- Developer: H2O Entertainment
- Publisher: THQ
- Directors: Christopher Bailey; David Dubord
- Producer: Gabriel Jones
- Designer: Christoph Klug
- Programmer: Christopher Bailey
- Artists: Christopher Bretz; Sarah Meagher
- Writer: Angela Ferraiolo
- Composers: Max Arnason; Rob Plotnikoff; Steven Sim
- Platform: Nintendo 64
- Release: NA: March 20, 2001; EU: August 3, 2001
- Genre: Role-playing
- Mode: Single-player

Aidyn Chronicles: The First Mage is a 2001 role-playing video game developed by Canadian studio H2O Entertainment and published by THQ for the Nintendo 64 video game console. It was released in North America on March 20, 2001, and in Europe on August 3, 2001. The player controls Alaron, a young squire who has been poisoned and seeks a cure. The game takes place in a 3D environment and features a party system, turn-based combat, abilities, items, and skill levels.

== Gameplay ==
The game takes place in a 3D world. The player controls a polygon-based figure of Alaron, moving him around both in and out of doors. The view is a mostly a third-person overhead behind him. Time passes in real time, with night and day affecting visibility and combat (see below). There is no way to change the speed Alaron moves, nor the camera view in normal gameplay. The player cannot control any other member of the party except in combat mode. A pop up menu allows the player to equip the party members, view abilities and stats, use items, and access the world map and options menu.

Combat is turn-based, though stats of the player's characters and attacking monsters can affect turn order. When combat starts, Alaron and his party are transported to a separate screen with varying terrain. The player can move each party member a certain distance marked by transparent borders. Positions of characters (such as height and back attacks') can increase/decrease the damage and effectiveness of attacks. Also the characters aspect (solar or lunar) will perform better or worse depending on what time of day it is. Spells and other talents area of effect is shown via a red flame border, and increases the higher the skill level. Any party member who dies during combat is permanently removed from the game with no ability of revival. If Alaron dies, the game is automatically over.

== Plot ==
Aidyn Chronicles: The First Mage follows a young squire named Alaron who, while searching for a missing farmer named Kendall, encounters a strange spirit and is poisoned by Goblins. He awakes from a terrifying vision of monsters to find himself inside the hut of Oriana, a healer, who tells Alaron that the poison is beyond the powers of normal medicine to cure. Upon returning to Castle Gwernia, the king, Phelan, instructs him to ask the Mirari people of Erromon to help heal his poison. Upon reaching Erromon, the Mirari King, Txomin, explains that they have been under attack from goblins and seeks Alaron's aid, promising to direct him to a naming wizard named Cradawgh.

Alaron clears the goblins off the mountains, however when he returns to Erromon he discovers that Txomin lied, and does not know the whereabouts of Cradawgh, telling Alaron instead to travel to Talewok, and see the sorceress, Ardra. Before leaving, Alaron converses with the Mirari queen Yeraza, who gives him the Stormbreaker, a blessed tree branch able to calm any storm.

At the Wizard School, the doorman asks everyone's True Name, but Alaron cannot answer. Ardra the sorceress begins the healing spell, which brings on another vision. This one includes a feeble, old man in a rocking chair. Ardra explains that the healing spell failed because Alaron is a Wildling – he has no True Name. Without a True Name, his spirit is not bound to his body, and Alaron is incomplete. Ardra tells him to travel to Port Saiid and take a boat to Cradawgh's Island.

Alaron is eventually able to hire a boat at Port Saiid – after an unusual encounter with a cryptic, unknown jester, but the ship travels into a powerful storm, and as the Stormbreaker is tied to the mast instead of the helm, the ship is damaged and forced to land at Chaos Isle. Following repairs the party sets off for Cradawgh's Island; this time the ship arrives safely, however a group of monsters has already reached Cradawgh. The dying wizard asks Alaron to bring his body to Talewok, and suggests seeking the Jundar King Zaratas in the desert.

After Cradawgh's funeral in Talewok, Alaron heads down to the city of Terminor. He then soon discovers that the nearby village of Pome was destroyed by a wizard with a twisted staff. The final level of Terminor has a house, in which resides Mago, a wizard without a True Name, who went insane several years ago and called up a huge storm when the townspeople tried to kill him. Mago is the feeble, old man from Alaron's earlier vision and can no longer speak.

Alaron travels to a nearby bog, where he finds the Tower of Shamsuk, a powerful necromancer who had previously destroyed Pome and cursed Niesen, slowly turning him into a zombie. Niesen gets the party into the tower where they eventually reach a chamber with a large stone hand. The jester from Port Saiid appears once more, revealing himself to be Farris – a wizard. Farris joins the party, assisting them in defeating Shamsuk, who has already killed Oriana – now revealed to be Alaron's mother. Farris then leaves the party, taking Shamsuk's necromantic staff with him.

Alaron crosses a desert to reach the Jundar city of Ugarit, where he speaks with the Jundar Emperor, Zaratas, who explains that only the dragon Rooughah can name Alaron. He needs to find the Golden Horn of Kynon and play it for Rooughah. Alaron retrieves the Horn, and begins heading back to Erromon.

Alaron travels through the Erromon tunnels until he comes across the dragon Rooughah. After Alaron plays the Horn of Kynon, Rooughah tells him he knows his True Name: "Alaron". The Mirari then tell Alaron that the forces of Chaos are gathering outside Gwernia. Alaron returns to Gwernia castle and fights his way to Prince Sheridan, who confesses to always being jealous of Alaron. Sheridan explains that Alaron is the son of Oriana and King Phelan. Alaron fights and kills Sheridan, only to then meet Pochangarat (the leader of Chaos) – the huge monster from Alaron's first vision in Oriana's hut.

After Pochangarat's death, Alaron finds his father, King Phelan, who is dying from the wounds he suffered at Pochangarat's hands. He requests to be buried under the Great Wall of Knights in Gwernia, and appoints Alaron as his successor before dying. The game's story ends with Alaron's coronation ceremony.

== Development and release ==
The plot of Aidyn Chronicles was scripted and designed by Angela Ferraiolo.

The game was developed by H2O Entertainment, a Canadian company.

The game was released in North America on March 20, 2001, and in Europe on August 3, 2001.

== Reception ==
Reception

Aggregate scores
Aggregator	Score
GameRankings	47.36%
Metacritic	53/100

Review scores
Publication	Score
Consoles +	40%
EP Daily	5.5/10
GamePro	3.125/5 (Note: GamePro gave Aidyn Chronicles: The First Mage three 3/5 scores for sound, control and fun factor and a 3.5/5 for graphics.)
GameSpot	5.9/10
Hyper	60/100
IGN	4.2/10
N64 Magazine	60%
Nintendo Power	3/5
Official Nintendo Magazine	70%
64 Magazine	73%

Aidyn Chronicles: The First Mage garnered "mixed or average reviews" according to review aggregator Metacritic, holding a 47.36% rating based on twelve reviews at GameRankings. IGN's Jon Griffith stated that "The scope of it was too large and led to a really -- and I mean really -- tedious experience. It has no way of pulling you into the story or gameplay."
