= City Crisis =

2001 video game

- European PlayStation 2 cover art
- Developer: Syscom Entertainment
- Publisher: Take-Two Interactive
- Engine: RenderWare
- Platform: PlayStation 2
- Release: JP: June 28, 2001; NA: July 17, 2001; EU: July 27, 2001
- Genre: Flight simulator
- Mode: Single-player

City Crisis (シティ クライシス, Shiti Kuraishisu) is a 2001 helicopter simulation video game developed by Syscom Entertainment and published by Take-Two Interactive for the PlayStation 2.

== Gameplay ==
The players role in the game is a rescue helicopter pilot. The object of the game is to save civilians from fires that spring up around the city. The player must also put out the fires using water that is dumped from the helicopter. Each mission has a time limit, but the faster the player saves people and puts out fires, the more time they receive to complete the next part of the mission. The game also features missions where a criminal is driving around the city, and the player must use their searchlight to help the police locate and stop them.

== Reception ==
Reception

Aggregate score
Aggregator	Score
Metacritic	63/100

Review scores
Publication	Score
AllGame	2.5/5
Edge	5/10
Electronic Gaming Monthly	6.5/10
Eurogamer	4/10
Famitsu	30/40
Game Informer	7/10
GamePro	4/5
GameRevolution	D+
GameSpot	6.3/10
GameSpy	55%
GameZone	7.8/10
IGN	4.8/10
Next Generation	3/5
Official U.S. PlayStation Magazine	3/5

The game received "mixed" reviews according to the review aggregation website Metacritic. Scott Steinberg of NextGen called it "a flight sim for gamers possessed of big hearts and razor-sharp hand-eye coordination". In Japan, Famitsu gave it a score of 30 out of 40.
