= Mobile Suit Gundam: Zeonic Front =

2001 video game

- Developer: BEC
- Publisher: Bandai
- Composers: Takanori Arima; Koji Yamada; Satoshi Ishikawa; Yasuharu Takanashi
- Series: Mobile Suit Gundam
- Platform: PlayStation 2
- Release: JP: September 6, 2001; NA: January 15, 2002
- Genres: Strategy; Mecha; Military Science Fiction

Mobile Suit Gundam: Zeonic Front (Note: Japanese: ZEONIC FRONT(ジオニックフロント) 機動戦士ガンダム0079, Hepburn: Jionikku Furonto Kidō Senshi Gandamu 0079; Zeonic Front: Kidō Senshi Gundam 0079) is a video game for the PlayStation 2. Set in the Gundam franchise's Universal Century timeline, Zeonic Front places players in the role of the Midnight Fenrir Corps, a mobile suit special forces unit of the Principality of Zeon, as it undertakes missions against the Earth Federation during the One Year War. This marked a notable departure from previous Gundam UC games, in which the player always fought on the side of the Earth Federation.

== Gameplay ==
Zeonic front allows players to take control of a variety of Principality of Zeon mobile suits from a third-person perspective across a linear sequence of missions that take place on sprawling battle zones around Earth. Before missions, players select which mobile suits they wish to control directly, with the remaining units of the Midnight Fenrir Corps being directed by game AI. Once a mission is underway, the player can swap between their selected units in order to manage different combat situations on the map as they arise. Completing a mission requires successfully achieving one or more progressive objectives, some of which can be tackled with multiple different tactical approaches. As the player advances through the campaign, more pilots join the Midnight Fenrir Corps, expanding the available mobile suit selection.

== Synopsis ==
=== Characters ===
Midnight Fenrir Corps

- LCDR. Garret Schmitzer - Commander of the Midnight Fenrir Corps. Schmitzer is a veteran of the One Week Battle and Operation British, where he was wounded in battle by Lt. Agar. Unable to pilot a mobile suit anymore, Schmitzer obtained Kycilia Zabi's permission to establish a new elite mobile suit unit that became Midnight Fenrir.
- Lt. Lou Roher - Midnight Fenrir's second-in-command. A top graduate of the Zeon Military Academy, Roher pilots a Zaku II, Gouf, and Gouf Custom over the course of the campaign.
- MCPO. Matt Austin - A friend of Lou Roher's who followed him to Midnight Fenrir. He stubbornly refuses to pilot anything other than a Zaku I.
- Lt. Renchef - Skilled and intelligent, but with a reputation for brutality, Renchef was shuffled between various units before joining Midnight Fenrir. He pilots a Gouf.
- Lt. Sophie Fran - An extremely talented MS Pilot who scored an amazing kill ratio before transferring to Midnight Fenrir. She pilots a Dom, Dom Tropen, and Dom Funf.
- Lt. Sandra - A weapons expert who easily adapts to experimental and standard equipment alike. She pilots a Zaku II and a Dom Tropen.
- Ens. Charlotte Hepner - A communications operator and reserve mobile suit pilot. She pilots a Zaku II.
- Ens. Nikki Roberto - An eager young pilot who is fresh out of training. He pilots a Dom and a Zaku II.
- CPO. Manning - A master sniper with a grudge against Renchef. He pilots a Zaku I, Gouf, and Gouf Custom.
- PO. Lee Swaggard - A reliable yet sometimes rash soldier who thrives on adversity. He pilots a Dom and a Zaku I.
- Migaki - Midnight Fenrir's technical supervisor.

Earth Federation Space Forces

- Lt. Agar - A Federation pilot and a recurring nemesis of the Midnight Fenrir Corps. He operates a RX-77-2 Guncannon and later the RX-78-6 Gundam Mudrock.

=== Plot ===
In March of UC 0079, the Midnight Fenrir Corps is deployed on its first mission: capturing an Earth Federation base in North America as part of the Principality of Zeon's second Earth Drop Operation. Midnight Fenrir captures the base easily, demonstrating the effectiveness of Lt. Garret Schmitzer's idea to use small mobile suit groups to carry out surgical strikes on enemy targets. Midnight Fenrir goes on to capture the Federation's key California Base, which becomes a major regional headquarters for Zeon's military operations. Zeon's eventual victory seems inevitable until the demise of Garma Zabi, overall commander of Zeon's Earth Attack Force, in the Battle of Seattle, and the emergence of Federation mobile suits, which turns the tide of the war. As the One Year War progresses, Midnight Fenrir is also hounded by EFSF Lt. Agar, who wounded Schmitzer earlier in the war and develops a grudge against his unit. Although Midnight Fenrir fights admirably during the pivotal Battle of Jaburo, the assault on the Earth Federation's underground military headquarters, the mission concludes in defeat for Zeon. As Zeon's forces evacuate from Earth and the primary battlefront moves into space, Midnight Fenrir decides to depart last and cover their comrades' retreat, but their evacuation shuttle is destroyed and they are left with no choice but to make their way to Australia to link up with other Zeon remnants. The final mission of the Midnight Fenrir Corps is to rescue a stranded allied unit in the Australian deserts that has been besieged by Earth Federation troops. Schmitzer's unit once again adroitly accomplishes its objective, but there is no time for celebration, as the Battle of A Baoa Qu was raging in space simultaneously and resulted in a decisive victory for the Earth Federation. Upon receiving the official ceasefire order from Zeon's prime minister, Midnight Fenrir returns to its makeshift base, with Schmitzer musing that while the war may have ended, the idea of an independent Zeon would live on in the hearts and minds of its people.

== Release and reception ==
Reception

Aggregate score
Aggregator	Score
Metacritic	71/100

Review scores
Publication	Score
Electronic Gaming Monthly	6.33/10
EP Daily	8/10
Famitsu	9/10, 9/10, 8/10, 9/10
Game Informer	7.75/10
GamePro	3.5/5
GameRevolution	B
GameSpot	6.8/10
IGN	6.5/10
Official U.S. PlayStation Magazine	3/5

Mobile Suit Gundam: Zeonic Front was released in Japan for the PlayStation 2 on September 6, 2001.

The game received "average" reviews according to the review aggregation website Metacritic.
