= Snoopy Tennis =

2001 video game

- European box art
- Developer: Mermaid Studios
- Publisher: Infogrames
- Platform: Game Boy Color
- Release: NA: April 3, 2001; PAL: October 26, 2001; JP: June 20, 2001
- Genre: Sports
- Modes: Single-player, multiplayer

Snoopy Tennis is a sports video game developed by the British company Mermaid Studios and published by Infogrames. It was released for the Game Boy Color in 2001. It was the first Peanuts video game released after Charles M. Schultz's death the year prior in 2000.

== Reception ==
Reception

Aggregate score
Aggregator	Score
GameRankings	85%

Review scores
Publication	Score
AllGame	4.5/5
Famitsu	20/40
Game Informer	7/10
GamePro	4/5
Nintendo Power	4.5/5

The game was met with positive reception, as GameRankings gave it a score of 85% based on only two reviews. In Japan, where the game was ported for release on June 20, 2001, Famitsu gave it a score of 20 out of 40.
