= Harley-Davidson & L.A. Riders =

1997 video game

- Developer: AM1
- Publisher: Sega
- Producers: Kazunari Tsukamoto, Rikiya Nakagawa
- Composer: Masanori Takeuchi
- Platform: Arcade
- Release: JP: December 1997; EU: 1998; NA: January 1998
- Genre: Driving game
- Modes: Single player, multiplayer
- Arcade system: Sega Model 3

Harley-Davidson & L.A. Riders (Note: Japanese: ハーレーダビッドソン&L.A.ライダーズ, Hepburn: Hārē-Dabiddoson & L.A. Raidāzu) is a 1997 open world racing video game developed by Sega AM1. It was developed for the Sega Model 3 Step 2.0 arcade hardware, featuring popular licensed motorcycles manufactured by Harley-Davidson, and is set in an open-world recreation of Los Angeles.

== Gameplay ==
Players choose one of five Harley-Davidson models (the FLSTF Fat Boy, FL Panhead 1948, FXDWG Dyna Wide Glide, XL 1200S Sportster 1200 Sport, and a police motorcycle) and can drive using either automatic or manual transmission. In manual transmission, the player has to shift gears with buttons on the left handle bar above the handle grip, with each bike having a 4 to 5 gear manual transmission.

When the bike is selected, the player has to complete a course of three to five randomly assigned checkpoints of popular destinations and freeways around Los Angeles for points, as well as avoid obstacles on the map, including vehicles, trees, and buildings. On the way to the designated checkpoint, the player has the option to take shortcuts, and collect bonus items scattered around the map that award either five to ten seconds of bonus time, or points ranging from 1,000 to 100,000, that can increase the player's score significantly.

The game was sold in two styles of arcade cabinet: a deluxe version that uses a 50-inch projection monitor and seat tilt, and a more standard sit-down cabinet with a smaller, 29-inch CRT monitor. A subwoofer is mounted inside the seats of both cabinets to provide additional rumble feedback for players while sitting on the motorcycle. The game allows up to four cabinets to be linked together for head-to-head, multiplayer racing. In multiplayer racing, all players start at the same location and must reach the same checkpoints.

The arcade cabinet consists of an analog handlebar with a gear shifter, throttle, and front brake which is used to assist the player in slowing the bike down. Below the handlebar mechanism is a plastic gas tank with View Change, Music Select, and Start buttons. By pressing the View Change button, players could change their view camera angles from three different perspectives — third-person (default; right behind the bike), second-person (far behind the bike), and a first-person view from the perspective of the motorcycle driver. During gameplay, players can change the background music with seven different songs by pressing the Music Select button, and can activate the bike's horn with the Start button.

On the bottom right side of the cabinet mounts a rear brake pedal. The Rear Brake is used to assist the player in making tighter turns, in order to avoid colliding with any obstacles.

== Development ==
Harley-Davidson & L.A. Riders was AM1's second project for the Sega Model 3 series of arcade platforms, following Sega Bass Fishing (known in Japan as Get Bass). It was also the first game to use the Step 2 version of the Model 3 board. In an interview with Edge magazine, AM1 executive producer, Rikiya Nakagawa, stated that they "wanted to make a game that allowed players the freedom to roam freely, albeit within the confines of a city environment", in attempts to deviate from the traditional style of racing games that usually limits players to choosing a set of predetermined, linear courses.

Throughout the game's planning stages, Nakagawa found that several of his teammates were Harley-Davidson fans, which prompted AM1 to set the game's focus on the player driving a motorcycle rather than driving a car, but he also noted that the Harley-Davidson name "has an established brand identity and image that his team thought would reflect well on the game," and that it has a "heroic, cinematic, rebellious image, encompassing a quarter-century of movie icons from Dennis Hopper in Easy Rider to Schwarzenegger in Terminator 2." In order to meet the deadlines for the final product, Nakagawa was forced to increase his team from ten to fourteen people. To aid in making the game's map as faithful to Los Angeles as possible, the developers visited the city with camcorders to record footage around the area, and used the footage as a reference to design the large map.

When the licensing agreement with the motorcycle company had been finalized, Harley-Davidson had provided the team a selection of its most popular bike models and loaned their machinery to the team to give them ideas to how each motorcycle would handle and react while playing the game. While the game was being developed, the implementation of roaming freely around the game's map was not without the concern of hardware limitations — Nakagawa said: "It proved very hard to reconcile all the elements we wanted to include — such as authentic areas of LA — with a game design that enabled the player to travel anywhere on a very large map. Players must be able to enjoy the game in any part of the map and get to it from a number of angles. This was particularly difficult. Furthermore, as players are in a town it would have been strange not to include other road users, so we added different vehicles to create a lively, cosmopolitan atmosphere."

== Soundtrack ==
The music of Harley-Davidson & L.A. Riders was composed by Masanori Takeuchi, who had worked for Sega AM1 at the time. In the initial Japanese release, the game's opening song, "All Around the World", featured a vocal track. In the game's international release, a "wah-wah pedal" effect was used in place of its original vocals. An official soundtrack album for the game was released on March 18, 1998, by Pony Canyon through its Marvelous Entertainment brand, who published soundtracks of many other Sega arcade games.
