= Crazy Taxi =

Series of racing video games

- Genre: Racing
- Developer: Hitmaker
- Publisher: Sega
- Platforms: Arcade; Dreamcast; PlayStation 2; GameCube; Windows; PlayStation 3; Xbox 360; iOS; Android; PlayStation Portable; Xbox; Game Boy Advance
- First release: Crazy Taxi; February 1999
- Latest release: Crazy Taxi Tycoon; 2017

Crazy Taxi is a series of racing games developed by Hitmaker and published by Sega. It was first available as an arcade video game in 1999, then released for the Dreamcast console in 2000. It is the third-best-selling Dreamcast game in the United States, selling over a million copies. The game was ported to the PlayStation 2, GameCube, and IBM PC compatibles with sequels appearing on the Xbox, Game Boy Advance, and PlayStation Portable systems.

Each game has the player assume the role of a taxi driver who must accumulate money by delivering passengers to their destinations in the fastest time possible, earning tips by performing "crazy stunts" before the time runs out. The franchise has been recognized for its innovative gameplay design which is easy to learn but difficult to master, its in-game advertising, and its soundtrack provided by the bands the Offspring and Bad Religion. The core gameplay mechanic was patented by Sega, leading to at least one lawsuit over similar gameplay in The Simpsons: Road Rage, which was settled out of court.

== Gameplay ==
The player picks up a passenger in Crazy Taxi. The image of the passenger's destination is shown to the left, while another potential passenger is shown in the background (with a "$" symbol over their head).

The player follows the on-screen arrow to deliver the passenger to their destination before the main time (upper left) and the passenger timer (green number in center) runs out. The player can earn extra tips by pulling off stunts.

Crazy Taxi and its sequels are score attack games that employ the same fundamental rules and mechanics. The player controls one of several taxi drivers in a fictional city, looking for fares and taking them to their destination in the fastest time possible. The player must perform this while time still remains on an overall gameplay clock. Passengers looking for rides are indicated by an overhead marker that is colored to represent the distance to their intended destination. The color marker ranges from red indicating short trips, to yellow for intermediate distances, and to green indicating long ones. When a passenger is picked up, the player is awarded additional time on the countdown clock. Furthermore, a second countdown timer is started, representing how quickly the passenger needs to be at their destination. While a passenger is in the taxi, a large green arrow is shown on the player's HUD that points in the general direction of the passenger's destination to help guide the player through the map.

The player can use special "crazy stunt" moves such as drifts, jumps, and near-misses, and consecutive combos of these, to earn extra money from the passenger during the trip. If the destination is reached in time, the player is paid based on distance driven with a possible time bonus based on how quickly the destination was reached. If the passenger's countdown strikes zero, they will exit the taxi without paying and the player will be required to look for another fare. The game continues in this mode as long as time remains on the main clock. Once the main clock reaches zero, the game is over, and the player is ranked and rated based on the total earned.

Unlike other arcade games, the player cannot continue from where the previous game ended. The game cannot be played indefinitely; while there are hundreds of potential passengers to pick up and deliver, there are only a limited number of fares in the game. The various passengers scattered throughout the city will randomly appear and disappear, but once one is picked up that passenger is unavailable for the rest of that game. The core gameplay in the series has been praised as being "deceptively complex"; as stated by the IGN staff for their review of the Dreamcast version of Crazy Taxi:

As you progress through the game's ratings scale by picking up and delivering passengers as quickly as possible, you will slowly but surely realize that there is much more to the game than getting from point a to b.

— IGN Staff, Crazy Taxi (Dreamcast) Review

Starting with Crazy Taxi 2, the gameplay included the ability to pick up a party of passengers, each having a different destination. The number of passengers in the car multiplies the tip bonuses earned from stunt driving, while the total fare can only be earned once the last passenger is dropped off in time. Additionally, Crazy Taxi 2 introduced a stunt move called the "Crazy Hop" that allowed the player to make the taxi jump to clear some obstacles or reach higher drivable surfaces.

The console games feature a set of mini-games that require the player to meet a certain objective using one or more of the various "crazy stunts". Some of these test the player's handling of a taxi, while others are more exaggerated, such as taxi bowling or pool. Some mini-games require the completion of others before they can be accessed.

Prior to each game session, the player can pick one of several drivers and their associated cars; each car/driver has slightly different performance relating to factors such as speed and turning that impact the game.

== Development ==
The original arcade game was developed by Hitmaker as a variation from then-current arcade titles. Crazy Taxi producer Kenji Kanno noted that the time extension on gameplay was a breakaway of the current "100 yen for 3 minutes" that persisted at the time for arcade games, and rewarded players with longer playing times by performing well. In addition to providing a game that could be played in short sessions, Kanno wanted to explore the "daily life and routine" of a taxi driver. In the development of the Dreamcast version of the original arcade game, the developers included a larger map in addition to the arcade one, as to create a feeling of "being lost" and allowing home console players to have fun "learning the town". Mini-games were developed for this version as to "let the player play longer if he improved skill" by offering challenges that were both fun and educational. Over one hundred different ideas for mini-games were developed by the team but then pared down for the Crazy Box mini-game challenges. The addition of the Crazy Hop in Crazy Taxi 2 came about because the development team noted that "...in New York – where the basic landscape is quite flat – we had to create 3D space by letting the player drive on the buildings" and "we added the Crazy Hop to let the player hop around the roofs of buildings to make short cuts".

Hitmaker had tried to develop an online version of Crazy Taxi, to be called Crazy Taxi Next for the Xbox, which, besides multiplayer game modes, would have included night and day cycles, each with a different set of passengers and destinations, while reusing and graphically updating the maps from Crazy Taxi and Crazy Taxi 2. Ultimately, both multiplayer and day/night cycles were dropped and work on Crazy Taxi Next was transferred to Crazy Taxi 3: High Roller, which included some of the nighttime driving concepts suggested by Next.

Kenji Kanno has noted that the gameplay in the Crazy Taxi series has otherwise not "evolved" with each game "because basically the whole point of the game is to have a lot of fun in a short period of time, and it's a very concentrated game. So instead of trying to evolve the series necessarily, it's more like taking that concept and putting it in different places – seeing how it works". Kanno considered bringing the title to newer consoles, but wanted to include multiplayer features and having a time cycle within the game that would affect passengers' attitudes and the environment of the game.

=== Setting ===
The locations of the Crazy Taxi games have been influenced by real-world cities, including San Francisco, Los Angeles, New York City, and Las Vegas. Certain versions of the Crazy Taxi include in-game counterparts of real-world businesses, such as Pizza Hut, Kentucky Fried Chicken, FILA, and Tower Records; these were often destination targets for the passengers. It this is one of the most prominent examples of product placement in video gaming history. It is generally looked upon relatively favorably amongst gamers, perhaps because it gives a sense of realism to the fictional cities. These establishments are replaced with generic businesses in later games due to licensing difficulties.

=== Soundtrack ===
The soundtrack of the Crazy Taxi series has typically been licensed hard rock and punk rock music. The arcade and initial home console versions include selections from punk rock bands The Offspring and Bad Religion, though these have been removed in both the Game Boy Advance and the PlayStation Portable remakes because of licensing issues. In the case of the Game Boy Advance Catch a Ride, the game uses instrumental music instead of recorded songs.

=== Legalities ===
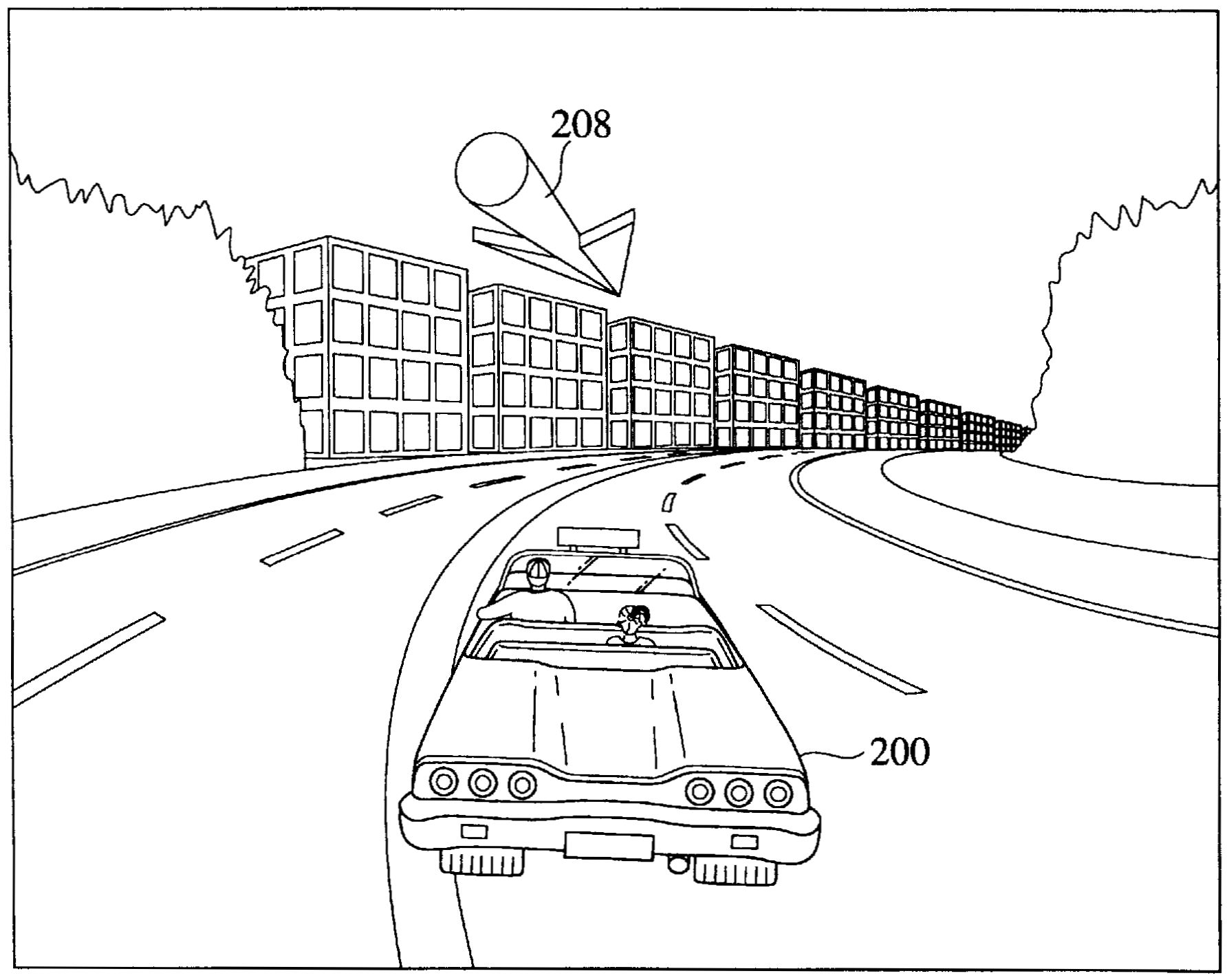
Sega patented the core gameplay mechanics of Crazy Taxi to prevent cloning by third parties.

Sega applied for and was awarded U.S. Patent 6,200,138 – "Game display method, moving direction indicating method, game apparatus and drive simulating apparatus" – in 2001. The mechanics in the "138 patent" describe an arcade cabinet similar to Sega's previous arcade game Harley-Davidson & L.A. Riders (1997), but also describe the arrow navigation system and pedestrian avoidance aspects that were used in Crazy Taxi.

In 2001, Electronic Arts and Fox Interactive released The Simpsons: Road Rage, which reviews identified as being clearly inspired by the gameplay of Crazy Taxi. In the game, the player controls one of The Simpsons characters as they drive around Springfield, bringing passengers to these destinations like in Crazy Taxi. In December 2003, Sega brought Fox Entertainment, Electronic Arts, and developer Radical Games Ltd. to court over this infringement of the 138 patent. The case, Sega of America, Inc. v. Fox Interactive, et al., was settled in private for an unknown amount. The 138 patent is considered one of the most important patents in video game development.

== Games ==
=== Crazy Taxi ===
The Crazy Taxi arcade cabinet

The arcade version of Crazy Taxi was released in February 1999, and featured only the San Francisco-inspired map (known as "Arcade" in the first console game, and later as "West Coast" in sequels). The "Standard Version" arcade cabinet included a cockpit seat, steering wheel, a gear shift lever (for forward and reverse gear) and a brake and acceleration pedal; a more compact "Naomi Cabinet Version" also existed without the cockpit seat. The arcade game was one of the first to use the Sega NAOMI hardware processor, which is based on the Sega Dreamcast and was unveiled as part of Sega's exhibition at the 1999 Amusement Operators Union exposition in Japan.

The console/home version of Crazy Taxi was released for the Dreamcast on January 24, 2000. The Dreamcast and the cabinet arcade version share nearly identical processing hardware, and porting the game to the home console was only made difficult due to the limited internal memory size on the Dreamcast. Sega used Crazy Taxi to show the power of the Dreamcast's graphical processor, capable of maintaining 60 frame/s throughout play. In addition to the arcade map, this version included the San Francisco-themed city (entitled "Original"), as well as additional mini-games ("Crazy Box") that can be used to hone the player's taxi handling skills. The new map, much larger than the arcade version, was designed to let the player experience the feeling of "being lost" and allow for exploration, something that could not be done on the arcade version, as well as letting "the player enjoy all 3 dimensions".

Once Sega left the hardware market, other companies began to take up some of the franchises, including Crazy Taxi. Acclaim brought the game to the PlayStation 2 on May 17, 2001, and GameCube on November 18, while Activision and Strangelite ported the game to the PC in 2002; only the PlayStation 2 port was more successful than the Dreamcast version, and the other games did not do as well. The Dreamcast version of Crazy Taxi was playable through emulation via GameTap on PC systems.

=== Crazy Taxi 2 ===
Crazy Taxi 2 was released for the Dreamcast on May 28, 2001. The game introduced four cab drivers as well as two maps based on New York City (called "Around Apple" and "Small Apple"), and added two gameplay features: the mechanics of collecting multiple passengers from a single spot, and the "Crazy Hop", allowing the taxi to clear traffic and certain obstacles with short jumps. Additionally, the "Crazy Box" mode in the first game was expanded into a "Crazy Pyramid" mode.

=== Crazy Taxi 3: High Roller ===
Crazy Taxi 3: High Roller was released for the Xbox on July 23, 2002, and released as a PC title in 2004. The game reuses the original arcade map modified to allow the use of the "Crazy Hop" introduced in Crazy Taxi 2, one of the maps from Crazy Taxi 2, and a map based on Las Vegas ("Glitter Oasis"). The game adds an additional four characters to select. The game allows the player to unlock other modes of transport besides the taxi, including a stroller, a pedal bike and a carriage. The mini-games in Crazy Taxi 3 are featured in a "Crazy X" arrangement. An arcade version, entitled Crazy Taxi: High Roller was created in 2003 using the same three maps as the home console version.

=== Crazy Taxi: Catch a Ride ===
Crazy Taxi: Catch a Ride was ported to the Game Boy Advance by Graphics State and distributed by THQ, and released on April 8, 2003. This version is fundamentally the same as the Crazy Taxi console versions, featuring the San Francisco and Los Angeles-themed maps but with a smaller selection of mini-games, adapted to play on the portable device using the Graphics State "Rush" engine. Specifically, while the city and streets are rendered using 3D graphics, the taxi, passengers, and other traffic are represented by sprites to work on the limited GBA hardware. Richard Whittall, creative director for Graphics State, noted that Catch A Ride was "about the most technically challenging game you could do on a handheld machine" at the time of its release.

=== Crazy Taxi: Fare Wars ===
Crazy Taxi: Fare Wars was developed by Sniper Studios with support from members of the original Hitmaker Crazy Taxi design team in Japan and released for the PlayStation Portable on August 7, 2007. The game effectively is a port of both Crazy Taxi and Crazy Taxi 2 to this system without any changes to the gameplay, but lacking the in-game advertising and the original soundtracks. While the game includes its own soundtrack, the player can use their own music stored on the PSP; as noted by Jeff Hasson of Sniper Studios, "for those hard core fans that must have The Offspring playing, they have that option with the Custom Music Player". The player can record up to a minute of gameplay footage that can then be shared with friends. The game includes a multiplayer feature over the PSP's ad-hoc wireless system, allowing players to vie for fares within the same map, including the ability to steal passengers from another player. Multiplayer games such as time trials or "C-R-A-Z-Y" runs (a variation of the game "Horse") can also be played sharing a common PSP, with each player taking turns within the game.

=== Crazy Taxi: City Rush ===
Crazy Taxi: City Rush was announced by Sega in March 2014 as a free-to-play mobile title for iOS and Android systems. City Rush is a mission-based runner similar in concept to Temple Run, where the player does not have direct control of the speed of the taxi but can use touch motions to swerve in traffic and make turns.

=== Crazy Taxi Tycoon ===
Crazy Taxi Tycoon, previously known as Crazy Taxi Gazillionaire, was another mobile spin-off game developed by Demiurge Studios and released in 2017 for iOS and Android. Unlike other games, this is a top-down endless business management simulator and idle clicker where players run a taxi business and hire drivers to defeat a ridesharing megacorporation called Prestige Mega Corp. The game was delisted from both app stores in April 2020, with servers going offline the following month.

=== Crazy Taxi: World Tour ===
World Tour was announced in June 2026 with an estimated release window of 2027 for Xbox Series X/S, PlayStation 5, Nintendo Switch 2, and PC. It is set to be the first major game since 2002's Crazy Taxi 3: High Roller. The game will feature a single-player story campaign spread across five cities, as well as a traditional arcade mode and various multiplayer modes.

== Canceled ==
=== Crazy Taxi 4 ===
In 2015, concept art was discovered on the portfolio of former Sega Studios Australia employee Brooke Luder for Crazy Taxi 4, which had been pitched at an unknown date.

== Reception ==
Game	System	Metacritic	GameRankings
Crazy Taxi	Dreamcast	—	90% (41 reviews)
Crazy Taxi	PS2	80/100 (15 reviews)	79% (46 reviews)
Crazy Taxi	GameCube	69/100 (20 reviews)	70% (39 reviews)
Crazy Taxi	PC	—	56% (6 reviews)
Crazy Taxi 2	Dreamcast	82/100 (18 reviews)	83% (36 reviews)
Crazy Taxi 3: High Roller	Xbox	69/100 (33 reviews)	69% (59 reviews)
Crazy Taxi 3: High Roller	PC	—	49% (1 review)
Crazy Taxi: Catch a Ride	GBA	48/100 (14 reviews)	47% (15 reviews)
Crazy Taxi: Fare Wars	PSP	65/100 (20 reviews)	67% (16 reviews)
Crazy Taxi: City Rush	iOS	66/100 (8 reviews)	65.83% (6 reviews)

The original Dreamcast version of Crazy Taxi was one of the best-selling games for the console. The game was the second largest selling Dreamcast game in the United States in 2000, selling nearly 750,000 units, and is the third bestselling Dreamcast game in the United States with over a million units sold. The game was praised for capturing the arcade flavor, and possibly exceeding it by making the controls and execution of the crazy stunts easier to perform. The game did suffer from "pop-up" due to limited draw distances, and loss of frame rate when a large number of cars were on the screen. Critics noted the lack of depth given that it was a port of an arcade game, some difficulties with the destination arrow, and the poor "Wolfman Jack" impersonation of the in-game announcer.

Crazy Taxi 2 was well received by reviewers with the new features helping to expand play from the original game, though some thought that more drastic changes could have been made in the sequel. Despite the addition of new maps, the lack of new gameplay elements caused Crazy Taxi 3 to be panned by reviewers. IGN noted in its review for Crazy Taxi 3 that "it's clear that the creative vibrancy that first imagined the Taxi series has waned considerably".

The ports of the original game to the PS2 and GameCube platforms are not considered as strong as the Dreamcast game. Both were noted to suffer from more "pop-up" than the Dreamcast version, as well as poorer controls, despite having the same gameplay features. Graphic problems plagued the Crazy Taxi: Catch a Ride port to the Game Boy Advance; as IGN stated, "it's painfully obvious that the hardware just was never meant to push so much". Both PC ports for Crazy Taxi and Crazy Taxi 3 also suffered from graphics problems.

The PSP ports of Crazy Taxi: Fare Wars have had a somewhat better reception than other ports. Reviews have complimented the game on the multiplayer additions and the ability to add a custom soundtrack – which led IGN to comment that "including this should be a no-brainer, but many PSP titles don't" – but have noted some graphical glitches, the long loading times, and the lack of the original soundtracks for the games. The reviews of the controls of the game have mixed, with some praising the scheme on the PSP, while others have stated that the controls feel stiff and inconsistent. GameSpot's review noted that the gameplay in Crazy Taxi does not hold up well compared to more recent racing games across various platforms.

A Crazy Taxi segment is featured in the "Sega Carnival" track in Sonic Riders, including a hidden shortcut allowing racers to receive a ride from taxi driver Axel; a Crazy Taxi extreme gear can be unlocked as well. There is also a minigame based on Crazy Taxi in the EyeToy game, Sega Superstars, in which players move around and shout to call one of the taxi drivers. B.D. Joe, who has appeared in most games in the series, appears as a playable character in the cross-series racing game, Sonic & Sega All-Stars Racing. Sumo Digital's Steve "S0L" Lycett had to get approval from SEGA AM3 to use B.D. Joe in the game. He also appeared in the sequel, Sonic & All-Stars Racing Transformed. Axel was later added to Sonic Racing: CrossWorlds as a playable character via a free update.

== Beyond video games ==
The Crazy Taxi Redemption Game arcade cabinet

In addition to the video arcade games, Sega Enterprises, Inc. (USA) created a Crazy Taxi themed redemption game which was released in 2003. The player had to roll their coin or token down the sloped playing surface past a moving taxi model in the center of the playing field to hit one of eight targets (representing passengers) at the far end. Passengers were worth different points, from which the operator would then set the number of tickets to be won. The game incorporated music and sounds from the video games.

Crazy Taxi GearHead RC car with Axel driving

There have been two attempts to create a movie based on the Crazy Taxi franchise. In 2001, Goodman-Rosen Productions acquired the rights for the movie, with Richard Donner lined up to direct the film. Donner said that he loved playing Crazy Taxi and thought it had the potential to be a big summer event movie. The movie would have been tied with other merchandise items such as T-shirts and toys, according to Jane Thompson, director of licensing for Sega of America. However, this initial attempt stalled due to an "absence of plot elements" according to Movie Insider. After this option expired, Mindfire Entertainment acquired the rights to a Crazy Taxi movie based on the game franchise in 2002, with a then-expected release date in mid-2003. No further news on the film has been forthcoming afterwards. Talk of a screen adaptation of Crazy Taxi was renewed in 2014, as Sega optioned the film and TV rights to its library. In 2026, Netflix announced multiple projects made in partnership with Sega, which includes a Crazy Taxi movie. The film will be written by Dan Gregor and Doug Mand, with Original Film producing.

In 2003, Sega entered a contract with DSI Toys to produce a remote controlled car in their "GearHead" line based on the Crazy Taxi franchise, but DSI filed for chapter 7 bankruptcy later that year. Sega has formed the production company Stories International and teamed up with Evan Cholfin for film and TV projects based on their Crazy Taxi games.
