= Sega All Stars =

Collection of budget titles for Sega Dreamcast

Sega All Stars was Sega's budget series for the Dreamcast in North America. It included a total of 17 titles, each retailing for $19.95 in the United States and $29.95 in Canada. Seven of these were first released as Dreamcast launch titles. Sega All Stars titles are typically rated "E for Everyone" by the ESRB, and typically have a sports theme, but there are a few exceptions.

Game covers were given an orange bar (as opposed to Europe's blue color scheme) with the brand name written from top to bottom. The disc labels were also changed to include a small circle and the Sega All Stars brand printed inside of it. Also, in printing, original releases said "Sega Dreamcast" on the disc but the All-stars versions just simply said "Dreamcast" to match up games released with the black label. Original Dreamcast games were released in the white labels and said "Sega Dreamcast" on the inlay like the Sega All-stars labels.

In Japan, the budget line was known as Dreamcast Collection, or DoriKore for short. The first six games in the series feature completely redesigned cover art. Another 50 games in the series only featured a DoriKore sticker on the plastic wrapper, making these games otherwise indistinguishable from regular releases.

== List of games ==
=== North America ===
Game	Release date	
Game	Original	Sega All Stars
Crazy Taxi	January 24, 2000	October 31, 2000
The House of the Dead 2	September 9, 1999	August 22, 2000
Hydro Thunder	September 9, 1999	December 21, 2000
Marvel vs. Capcom: Clash of Super Heroes	October 7, 1999	2000
NBA 2K	November 10, 1999	August 22, 2000
NBA 2K1	November 1, 2000	August 13, 2001
NFL 2K	September 9, 1999	August 15, 2000
NFL 2K1	September 7, 2000	August 13, 2001
NFL Blitz 2000	September 9, 1999	December 21, 2000
NHL 2K	February 9, 2000	2000
Power Stone	September 9, 1999	2001
Ready 2 Rumble Boxing	September 9, 1999	December 21, 2000
Sega Bass Fishing	September 30, 1999	August 22, 2000
Sonic Adventure	September 9, 1999	August 22, 2000
Tony Hawk's Pro Skater	May 22, 2000	2001
Virtua Tennis	July 7, 2000	2001
World Series Baseball 2K1	July 17, 2000	2001

=== Japan ===
- 18 Wheeler: American Pro Trucker
- 21: Two One
- Aero Dancing F
- Airforce Delta
- Black/Matrix Advanced
- Capcom vs. SNK 2: Millionaire Fighting 2001
- Capcom vs. SNK: Millennium Fight 2000 Pro
- Castle Fantasia Seima Taisen
- Close to: Inori no Oka
- Comic Party
- Confidential Mission
- Cool Boarders Burrrn
- Crazy Taxi 2
- Culdcept Second
- Cyber Troopers Virtual-On: Oratorio Tangram M.S.B.S. Ver. 5.4
- D+Vine (Luv)
- De La Jet Set Radio
- Dousoukai 2 Again & Refrain
- Ever 17: the out of infinity: Premium Edition
- Fighting Vipers 2
- Gaia Master Kessen! Seikiou Densetsu
- Grandia II
- Guilty Gear X
- Hanagumi Taisen Columns 2
- Happy Lesson
- Inoue Ryouko: Roommate
- Interlude
- Kidou Senkan Nadesico: Nadesico the Mission
- Memories Off 2nd
- Memories Off Complete
- Mercurius Pretty: End of the Century
- Miss Moonlight
- Moero! Justice Gakuen
- Napple Tale: Arsia in Daydream
- Never 7: The End of Infinity
- NFL 2K
- Pandora no Yume
- Power Stone 2
- Princess Maker Collection
- Puyo Puyo Fever
- Record of Lodoss War
- Renai Chu! Happy Perfect
- Roommate Asami: Okusama ha Joshikousei - Director's Edition
- Roommate Novel: Satou Yuka
- Segagaga
- Shenmue II
- Space Channel 5
- Tako no Marine
- Tentama: 1st Sunny Side
- The King of Fighters 2000
- The King of Fighters 2001
- The King of Fighters 2002
- The King of Fighters: Dream Match 1999
- Yoshia no Oka de Nekoronde...
- Yume no Tsubasa: Fate of Heart
- Zero Gunner 2

== Legacy ==
Three Sega All Stars titles (Crazy Taxi, Sega Bass Fishing and Sonic Adventure) were remastered in high definition for the Dreamcast Collection in 2011, which also includes Space Channel 5: Part 2. Two Sega All Stars titles (Crazy Taxi and an updated version of Virtua Tennis) were ported to Android and iOS as free Sega Forever downloads.

The Sega All Stars name would be reused in the 2010 racing game Sonic & Sega All-Stars Racing, and eventually Sega themselves would acknowledge Sega Superstars and Sega Superstars Tennis under the Sega All-Stars name right alongside Sega All-Stars Racing and Sonic & All-Stars Racing Transformed.

== See also ==
- Nintendo Selects
- Sony's Greatest Hits and Essentials
- Microsoft's Platinum Hits and Xbox Classics
