= Space Channel 5 VR: Kinda Funky News Flash =

2020 video game

- Developer: Grounding Inc
- Publisher: Grounding Inc
- Director: Noboru Hotta
- Producer: Minoko Okamura
- Designer: Atsushi Aoshima
- Programmer: Naoya Kurihara
- Artist: Yumiko Miyabe
- Writer: Takumi Yoshinaga
- Composers: Naofumi Hataya; Kenichi Tokoi; Mariko Nanba; Tomoya Ohtani; Tomoko Sasaki; Yutaka Minobe
- Series: Space Channel 5
- Engine: Unity
- Platforms: PlayStation 4, Oculus Quest, Viveport, Microsoft Windows
- Release: PlayStation 4; February 20, 2020; Oculus Quest; October 15, 2020; Viveport; November 20, 2020; SteamVR; December 8, 2020
- Genre: Music
- Mode: Single player

Space Channel 5 VR: Kinda Funky News Flash (Note: Space Channel 5 VR: Arakata Dancing Show (Japanese: スペースチャンネル5 VR あらかた★ダンシングショー, Hepburn: lit. Almost All Dancing Show)) is a 2020 rhythm video game developed and published by Grounding Inc for virtual reality (VR) platforms on PlayStation 4, Oculus Quest, Viveport and Windows. Following a new reporter assigned to assist Space Channel 5 protagonist Ulala during an alien threat covered by the titular news network, players engage in motion-based combat by mimicking the actions of opponents in time to musical tracks.

Space Channel 5 VR is the first main game in the Space Channel 5 franchise since 2003, with the previous installment being Space Channel 5: Ulala's Cosmic Attack for the Game Boy Advance. Production of Space Channel 5 VR began in 2018 following positive feedback of a VR demo created by Grounding in collaboration with KDDI using the series characters and gameplay. Several original staff returned including Yumiko Miyabe as a lead artist, original writer Takumi Yoshinaga, Minoko Okamura as producer and the voice of Ulala, and Naofumi Hataya as sound director.

Unlike the previous installments in the franchise, Space Channel 5 VR received mostly mixed reviews from video game journalists, with praise for its translation of the series gameplay and art design into VR, but it was also widely faulted for its lack of content, short gameplay, and exclusion and sidelining of fan-favorite characters. According to review aggregator Metacritic, it is the worst rated game in the franchise.

== Synopsis and gameplay ==
The player's view in virtual reality during gameplay

In the virtual reality (VR) music video game Space Channel 5 VR: Kinda Funky News Flash, players take on the role of one of novice reporters Roo and Kie for the titular news channel in a 1960s-styled science fiction future filled with competing news channels; the player's mentor is series protagonist Ulala. Initially drawn to a repeat invasion by the Morolians, and competing with other reporters and channels along the way, the player and Ulala end up facing off against Glitter, a powerful alien being who wants to consume all the galaxy's dance energy.

The game is split between the story mode, a training mode, and a 100-stage endurance mode. Including the tutorial, there are five stages in the story campaign. As with previous entries, gameplay focuses on mimicking the movements and vocalisations of opponents (compared by journalists to the game Simon Says). Players perform actions by physically moving their body in time to instructions. Actions are performed in time to music tracks playing in each section of a stage. Character actions carried over from the original games are up, down, left, right and actions accompanied by the vocalization "Chu". Two New actions are "Pose", where the player must match the enemy's body pose, and "Barrier", where players summon a special shield to protect themselves.

== Development ==
Space Channel 5 (1999) and its sequel Part 2 (2002) were produced by Sega's internal United Game Artists studio for the Dreamcast. The games were created by Tetsuya Mizuguchi as a title aimed at a wide gaming demographic that would experiment with existing gameplay of the time for the music game genre. Following the merger of United Game Artists during Sega restructuring in 2003, many of its developers left the company; Mizuguchi founded Q Entertainment in 2003, while a number of others formed Grounding Inc. in 2007 with staff from the Panzer Dragoon series. A notable staff member of Grounding was Minoko Okamura, who was an assistant producer on the original game and provided the voice of Ulala.

While concepts existed for a third game in the series and pitches were made for the Wii and Kinect, the team felt they had exhausted their ideas, and Sega showed little interest in a new entry. At one time, Mizuguchi and Q Entertainment were in discussions with Sega about reviving the series for HD consoles. Discussions about a new Space Channel 5 game were revived following the Game Symphony Japan 14th Concert SEGA Special in 2015, which featured a performance of the series theme "Mexican Flyer" and the second game's ending theme "This is my Happiness". Okamura met up with other former staff members at the concert, and saw there was a wish in the gaming industry for a new Space Channel 5 project. Another inspiration for returning to the series was the mainstream success of the 2016 musical La La Land. While it was considered to simply make a Part 3, Okamura instead opted for a VR project. There was also a reluctance to follow on from Part 2, which was considered the best the series could be in its normal form.

Okamura pitched the concept to Sega, who greenlit an experimental VR prototype created in collaboration with KDDI. This prototype, Space Channel 5 VR: Ukiuki Viewing Show, (Note: lit. Exciting Viewing Show (スペースチャンネル5 VR ウキウキ★ビューイング ショー)) was shown off in 2016 at that year's Tokyo Game Show. Due to positive fan reaction, a full virtual reality game was approved. Most of the original staff, who had stayed in touch over the years, reunited to develop Space Channel 5 VR. Okamura acted as producer, former graphic designer Noboru Hotta was director, Takumi Yoshinaga returned as story and game design consultant, and composer Naofumi Hataya was sound director. Newcomer Naoya Kurihara acted as lead programmer. Yoshinaga, who was still with Sega, helped the team obtained Sega's permission to use the licence. Okamura contacted Mizuguchi to see if he was interested in joining, but while he gave the game his approval he was unable to join due to other commitments.

Full production began in 2018. It was designed using the Unity game engine, chosen due to its adaptability to various game devices and ease of development. Because of the staff's familiarity with each other and the series, production went smoothly. Hotta created the storyboards for the whole planned game after Yoshinaga came on board, wanting the story and gameplay to be fully integrated. During early prototyping, a version was tried where players could control the game using the DualShock 4, but this did not provide much immersion so the controls were tailored to the PlayStation Move. The first prototype also required far more precision with the player's movements, resulting in testers getting very low scores, so the requirements were relaxed. One of the most stressful elements was timing the effects and music with the player's movements, especially as the game progressed and corrections to music timing became more difficult. They also needed to make environments and displays while accounting for potential motion sickness in players. The team also incorporated a caloric counter with help from the Virtual Reality Institute of Health and Exercise, as they felt the dance moves would double as a workout for players.

Original artist Yumiko Miyabe returned to design the characters. She had left the gaming industry, but was able to return due to her continuing friendship with former staff at Grounding. A notable artistic change was Ulala's outfit, which was made a neon yellow to represent the series's shift into virtual reality. To distinguish the game and allow Ulala to remain clearly visible to players, the new characters Roo and Kie. To balance this out, previously-established rival characters were brought back. So as to appeal to the series' large female fan base, the team consulted with Miyabe and other female staff to design the new characters so they would be appealing without being sexualised. Despite the change in platform and increased hardware, the team wanted to keep the established "retro sci-fi" aesthetic. When creating the character models, the team went through a repeated process of destroying and rebuilding the models until they fitted into the game's world while remaining true to the series. Some of the planned graphical effects had to be toned down for the final release as they caused the frame rate to drop.

The aim for the narrative was to be nostalgic, blending established characters with newcomers. The new player protagonists who work under Ulala were chosen so players could continue to see and admire Ulala, while also encouraging a feeling of supporting her reports. The game's title in Japanese was intended to reference that participation. The team managed to bring back the original motion actors for characters, and some of the original voice cast. These included Japanese dancer Nazu Nahoko, who had choreographed and portrayed Ulala since the first game. Among returning voices were Okamura as Ulala, Show Hayami and Tom Clarke-Hill as rival reporter Jaguar, and Kae Īda as fellow rival Pudding. For Ulala's English voice, the team tried to bring back original voice actress Apollo Smile, who had retired from the industry. Smile was uninterested in returning, so the part was recast with Cherami Leigh. Okamura described her voice as fitting best with Ulala's personality and appearance.

== Release ==
Space Channel 5 VR was announced in February 2019, where it was said development was 40% complete. When it received a demo at the 2019 Tokyo Game Show in September, it was reported to be 70% complete. Space Channel 5 VR was the first game Grounding both developed and published in-house. Originally scheduled for release on PlayStation VR, SteamVR, HTC Vive and Oculus Quest during December 2019, the game was delayed into Spring of the following year to improve its quality. It was released for PlayStation VR on February 25, 2020. This release received downloadable content in July featuring vocaloid mascot Hatsune Miku, including a new level and Miku as a costume option for Ulala. It released for Oculus Quest systems on October 15. It released for HTC Vive's Viveport device on November 20. The Steam version released on December 8. The Oculus and SteamVR versions came bundled with the Hatsune Miku DLC.

== Reception ==
Reception

Aggregate score
Aggregator	Score
Metacritic	54/100 (PS4)

Space Channel 5 VR: Kinda Funky News Flash was met with "mixed or average" reviews. On PlayStation 4, the game scored 54 out of 100 on review aggregator Metacritic based on fifteen reviews. Chris Kohler, writing for Kotaku, called the game "an authentic Space Channel 5 experience" and praised its replication of the earlier art design and translation of the gameplay into VR. Annette Polis of Siliconera noted the gameplay as giving her a hard workout, particularly the 100-stage marathon, comparing it more to an exercise game than the earlier music games.

Luke Hemming of Cubed3 noted a lack of content for the asking price, but enjoyed the nostalgic graphic design and found the gameplay solid and a good evolution of the earlier games, and hoped that an edition with promised DLC additions would be released to address the content issues. Ars Technica's Sam Machovech gave praise to the translation of the Space Channel 5 gameplay into VR, but otherwise named it "the worst value proposition of any PlayStation VR game ever made" due to the lack of features and low-quality sound design. Wireframe's Jordan Oloman was generally negative about the game, referring to it as a cashgrab based on nostalgia about the series, citing the lack of features and simplified gameplay and controls.
