= Apollo Smile =

American singer (born 1967)

- Born: Paula Anne Scharf; February 16, 1967 (age 59); New Haven, Connecticut
- Genre: Pop
- Occupations: Singer-songwriter, dancer, voice actress
- Years active: 1989–present

Paula Anne DeMonico (born February 16, 1967), known professionally as Apollo Smile, is an American pop music singer-songwriter, voice actress, and media personality. In the 1990s, Smile billed herself as the "Live Action Anime Girl" and was invited to several science fiction conventions as a guest. She is best known for her portrayal as reporter Ulala from the Space Channel 5 series.

Smile's notable works include Sonic & All-Stars Racing Transformed, Iria: Zeiram the Animation, Space Channel 5: Part 2, Monk, Wild Cardz, Sega Superstars Tennis, Battle Arena Toshinden, Sonic & Sega All-Stars Racing, Sega Superstars, and Voltage Fighters: Gowcaizer the Movie.

== Early life and education ==
Paula Scharf was born with a twisted hip tendon, leading her mother to enroll her in physical activity at the age of three to treat it. Thus becoming a trained dancer and gymnast from early childhood. She grew up in the nearby coastal town of Guilford, Connecticut, where she formed a strong attachment to her hometown community and environment during her formative years. After graduating Guilford High School in 1985, she went to study at the University of the Arts (Philadelphia) and then the Alvin Ailey American Dance Theater in New York City. While introducing herself to a college student in New York, he misheard Paula as "Apollo", and went on to say that it fit her despite being a male name, as the Greek god Apollo represented "cheerfulness, dance, light, and poetry", so she went with it. The latter part of her name came as a producer suggested an equally different surname, exploiting Scharf's often complimented smile. She legally changed her name to Apollo Smile in 1991.

== Career ==
An injury made Scharf opt a singing career, working with producer Freddie "Groove Commander" Richmond. After contributing the song "Let's Rock" for A&M Records' soundtrack for the 1989 film Lost Angels, a Los Angeles friend of Richmond once visited his studio and she was impressed with the songs he was working on with Smile. He smuggled a tape of theirs to a Geffen Records executive. Soon the A&R man went to New York to court Smile, and four months later she had signed with DGC Records. In 1990, Smile's song "Thunderbox" was featured on the soundtrack album for the Tom Cruise film Days of Thunder, and the following year she released a self-titled album, from which came the track. However, some months afterwards Smile was dropped.

By the late 1990s, Smile was attending conventions of anime, a lifelong fandom of hers. This led to her 1996 reinvention of herself as the "Live Action Anime Girl", wearing skin-tight spandex clothing, with her blonde hair in pigtails tied off with pink bows. Her appearances usually showcased music concerts featuring her original upbeat music and demonstrations of her martial arts abilities. Soon, she got to work as an anime voice actress, and was called by the Sci-Fi Channel to host Anime Week in the summer of 1998. Other projects included a self-published comic book featuring herself as the central character, and the voice of Ulala in the Space Channel 5 video game series.

In 2001, while Smile was doing stunt work and voice acting, she wished to return to music, and joined Virginia-based "Atari rock" band Rockbot. Smile recorded one EP with Rockbot before leaving in 2003, while continuing her stunt and acting work. Smile's mother became ill in 2006, making her return to her hometown to take care of her mother. The move brought Smile's career in dance and choreography back into focus. She got a job as a dance teacher at New Haven Ballet, as well as dancing schools in Killingworth and Guilford, and choreographed various high school dances ever since. Smile was also inspired by her father, who had Parkinson's disease, to develop an exercise dancing routine for older people with movement-impairing illnesses such as Parkinson's and arthritis.

In 2019, she formed the music duo Wingbeat with her husband Paul DeMonico.

== Personal life ==
She lives with her husband, Dominic DeMonico, in Alabama.

== Filmography ==
=== Film and television ===
Acting

- "Alana Payne" in Drop Dead Rock (film)
- "Apollo Smile" in Sidesplitters: The Burt & Dick Story (Short film)
- "Eva" in Division-Trade (Short film)
- "Skater No. 2" in Monk (Episode: Mr. Monk Takes Manhattan) (uncredited)

Stunts

- Uptown Girls (film: doubling for Brittany Murphy)
- Hope and Faith (TV: doubling for Kelly Ripa)
- 24 (TV: doubling for Elisha Cuthbert)
- The Sopranos (TV)

=== Voice roles ===
- "Additional Voices" in Iria: Zeiram the Animation (OVA)
- "Coco Hearts" in Wild Cardz (OVA)
- "Karin Son" in Voltage Fighters: Gowcaizer the Movie (OVA)
- "Tracy" in Battle Arena Toshinden (OVA)
- "Nova" in Megas XLR
- "Ulala" in Dreamcast Collection (Xbox 360, PC)
- "Ulala" and "Pudding" in Sonic & All-Stars Racing Transformed
- "Ulala" and "Pudding" in Sega Superstars Tennis
- "Ulala" in Sonic & Sega All-Stars Racing
- "Ulala" in Space Channel 5 (Dreamcast, PlayStation 2)
- "Ulala" in Space Channel 5: Part 2 (Dreamcast, PlayStation 2)
- "Ulala" in Space Channel 5: Special Edition (PlayStation 2)

== Discography ==
=== Albums ===
- Apollo Smile (1991)
- Dune Buggy (1991)
- Love Kisses And Grenades (1998)
- Wrecking Ball (2000)
