= Ulala =

Ulala may refer to:

- Ulala (Space Channel 5), a reporter from Space Channel 5, a Japanese music video game
- Ulala Serizawa, a character from Persona 2: Eternal Punishment, a role-playing video game
- Ulala, name of Gorno-Altaysk, a town in the Altai Republic, Russia, in 1824–1932

== See also ==
- "My Way: Ulala", a 2010 single by Japanese group Dream
- Ulala Session, a K-pop boy band
- University of Louisiana at Lafayette, a state university in Louisiana, United States
