= Cherami Leigh =

American actress (born 1988)

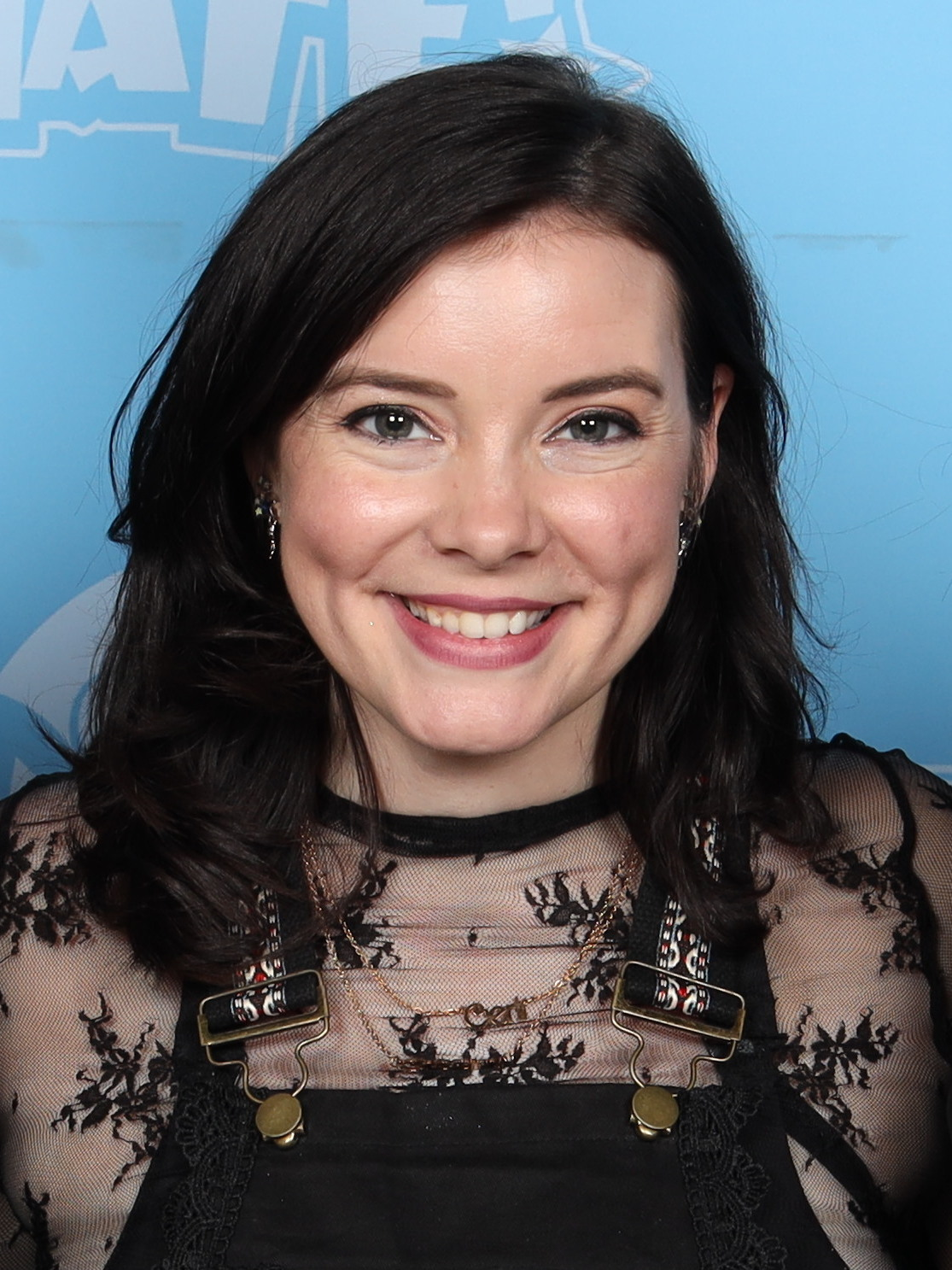
- Leigh in 2024 at Animate! Columbus
- Born: Cherami Leigh Kuehn; July 19, 1988 (age 38); Dallas, Texas, U.S.
- Education: Collin College
- Occupation: Actress
- Years active: 1994–present
- Agent: CESD Talent
- Spouse: Jon Christie (m. 2014)
- Children: 1

Cherami Leigh Kuehn (born July 19, 1988) is an American actress. She has provided voices for a number of English-language versions of anime series and video games.

== Early life and education ==
Leigh began acting at the age of six. Leigh studied the Meisner technique with Nancy Chartier from the age of nine. As a child actress, she played Gretchen in Finding North, Marcia in Temple Grandin, young LeAnn Rimes in Holiday in Your Heart, Stacy Anderson in The President's Man and appeared on Walker, Texas Ranger multiple times.

She attended Hebron High School in Carrollton and studied theater at Collin College, a public community college in Plano, Texas.

== Career ==
She also worked for Radio Disney as a DJ with voice-over promotions and commercials for ABC Radio for 10 years. In 2013, she moved to Los Angeles where she continued voice-work and began taking on live-action roles.

Some of her roles include Kazari Uiharu in A Certain Magical Index and A Certain Scientific Railgun series, Yoshika Miyafuji in Strike Witches, Eucliwood Hellscythe in Is This a Zombie?, Mutsuki in KanColle: Kantai Collection, Aisa in One Piece, Mika Shimotsuki in Psycho-Pass, Suzuha Amane in Steins;Gate, Shijima Kurookano in Nabari no Ou, Hibiki in Sekirei, Elizabeth Midford in Black Butler, Road Kamelot in D.Gray-man, Sae Kashiwagi in Peach Girl, Tamaki Kawazoe in Bamboo Blade, Patty Thompson in Soul Eater, Lucy Heartfilia in Fairy Tail, Cecily Campbell in The Sacred Blacksmith, Asuna Yuuki in Sword Art Online, Kanono Ozu in Coppelion, Sailor Venus in the Viz Media dub of Sailor Moon, Plutia / Iris Heart in Hyperdimension Neptunia, Ulala in the Space Channel 5 series, Sarada Uchiha in Boruto: Naruto Next Generations, and Ilia Amitola in RWBY.

On screen she has played a young LeAnn Rimes in Holiday in Your Heart and has appeared on Bones, Friday Night Lights, Longmire and Shameless.

In video games, she voices Rottytops in the Shantae series, Gaige the Mechromancer in the Borderlands series, Arianrhod in The Legend of Heroes: Trails of Cold Steel IV, Minerva in The Walking Dead: The Final Season, Rhea in Fire Emblem: Three Houses, Komaru Naegi in Danganronpa Another Episode: Ultra Despair Girls, Makoto Niijima in Persona 5, Cotton Cookie in Cookie Run: Kingdom, and the Female V in Cyberpunk 2077 for which she was nominated for a BAFTA Award for Performer in a Leading Role.

== Personal life ==
Leigh married fellow actor Jon Christie on April 13, 2014, whom she had dated since 2010. They have one daughter.

== Filmography ==
=== Voice acting ===
==== Anime ====
List of voice performances in anime
| Year | Title | Role | Notes | Ref(s). |
|---|---|---|---|---|
| 2007 | Shiki | Sunako Kirishiki | Debut role | |
| 2007 | Peach Girl | Sae Kashiwagi | | |
| 2007 | Baccano! | Mary Beriam | | |
| 2008 | Witchblade | Naomi | | |
| 2008 | Gunslinger Girl -Il Teatrino- | Beatrice | | |
| 2008 | One Piece | Aisa, Miss Goldenweek, Pepper, Carol Masterson | Funimation dub | |
| 2008 | Shuffle! | Primula | | |
| 2008 | xxxHolic | Himawari Kunogi | | |
| 2008 | Sasami: Magical Girls Club | Makoto Hozumi | | |
| 2008 | Ga-Rei: Zero | Mami Izumi | | |
| 2008 | Ghost Hunt | Mai Taniyama | | |
| 2008 | Ouran High School Host Club | Kirimi Nekozawa | | |
| 2008 | Negima!? | Setsuna Sakurazaki, Akira Okochi | | |
| 2009 | D.Gray-man | Road Kamelot | | |
| 2009 | Kaze no Stigma | Ayano Kannagi | | |
| 2009 | Big Windup! | Chiyo Shino'oka | | |
| 2009 | Sgt. Frog | Natsumi Hinata | Funimation dub | |
| 2009 | Nabari no Ou | Shijima Kurookano | | |
| 2009 | Kenichi: The Mightiest Disciple | Honoka Shirahama | | |
| 2009 | Bamboo Blade | Tamaki Kawazoe | | |
| 2010 | Rin ~Daughters of Mnemosyne~ | Yuki Maeno | | |
| 2010 | Soul Eater | Patty Thompson | | |
| 2010 | Strike Witches | Yoshika Miyafuji | | |
| 2010 | Birdy the Mighty: Decode | Natsumi Hayamiya | | |
| 2010 | Hetalia: Axis Powers | Liechtenstein | | |
| 2010 | My Bride Is a Mermaid | Lunar Edomame | | |
| 2010 | Corpse Princess | Itsuki Yamagami | | |
| 2010–12 | Sekirei | Hibiki | | |
| 2011 | The Sacred Blacksmith | Cecily Campbell | | |
| 2011 | Black Butler | Elizabeth Midford | | |
| 2011 | Dance in the Vampire Bund | Mei Ren | | |
| 2011–19 | Fairy Tail | Lucy Heartfilia, Layla Heartfilia, Ana Heartfilia | Also ADR Script Writer | |
| 2012 | B Gata H Kei: Yamada's First Time | Miharu Takeshita | | |
| 2012 | Panty & Stocking with Garterbelt | Kneesocks Daemon | | |
| 2012 | Is This a Zombie? series | Eucliwood Hellscythe | | |
| 2012 | Steins;Gate | Suzuha Amane | | |
| 2012–17 | Blue Exorcist | Yuri Egin | 2 episodes | |
| 2013 | Digimon Fusion | Lopmon, Luca | | |
| 2013 | Tenchi Muyo! War on Geminar | Wahanly Shume | | |
| 2013 | A Certain Scientific Railgun | Kazari Uiharu | Also S and T | |
| 2013–present | Sword Art Online | Asuna Yuuki | Also movie | |
| 2014 | Ikki Tousen: Xtreme Xecutor | Bachou Mouki | | |
| 2014 | Coppelion | Kanon Ozu | | |
| 2014 | Code:Breaker | Nenene Fujiwara | | |
| 2014 | A Certain Magical Index II | Kazari Uiharu | Also III | |
| 2014–15 | Psycho-Pass | Mika Shimotsuki | | |
| 2014–19 | Sailor Moon | Minako Aino / Sailor Venus | Viz Media dub | |
| 2015 | Soul Eater Not! | Patty Thompson | Episode: "This Is a Real Fight!" | |
| 2015 | Hyperdimension Neptunia: The Animation | Plutia / Iris Heart | | |
| 2015 | Daimidaler the Sound Robot | Kiriko Kiyuna | | |
| 2015 | Magi: The Kingdom of Magic | Toto | | |
| 2015–17 | Sailor Moon Crystal | Minako Aino / Sailor Venus | | |
| 2016 | The Asterisk War | Fan Xinglou | | |
| 2016 | Erased | Airi Katagiri | | |
| 2016 | Mobile Suit Gundam Thunderbolt: December Sky | Claudia Peer | | |
| 2016–18 | Mobile Suit Gundam: Iron-Blooded Orphans | Kudelia Aina Bernstein | | |
| 2016–19 | Mob Psycho 100 | Tome Kurata | | |
| 2017 | K: Return of Kings | Douhan Hirisaka | 3 episodes | |
| 2017 | Glitter Force Doki Doki | Regina, Patty | | |
| 2017 | Anohana: The Flower We Saw That Day | Haruna | | |
| 2017 | Garo: Crimson Moon | Princess Kaguya | | |
| 2017 | KanColle: Kantai Collection | Mutsuki | | |
| 2017 | Mobile Suit Gundam SEED | Cagalli Yula Athha | NYAV Post dub | |
| 2018 | Violet Evergarden | Iris Cannary | | |
| 2018 | Devilman Crybaby | Miko | | |
| 2018 | Gundam Build Divers | Aya Fujisawa / Ayame | | |
| 2018 | Muhyo & Roji's Bureau of Supernatural Investigation | Rio Kurotori | | |
| 2018 | GARO -Vanishing Line- | Lizzy | | |
| 2018 | Pop Team Epic | Popuko | Episode 5a | |
| 2018 | Ai Tenchi Muyo! | Ayeka | OVA | |
| 2018 | Last Hope | Emilia Valli | ADR Director | |
| 2018 | Lost Song | Rin | | |
| 2018, 2021 | The Seven Deadly Sins | Jenna | | |
| 2018–20 | Baki | Kozue | | |
| 2018, 2020, 2022, 2024 | My Hero Academia | Pixie-Bob | | |
| 2018–24 | Boruto: Naruto Next Generations | Sarada Uchiha, Anko Mitarashi, Kurotsuchi | Replacing Laura Bailey | |
| 2019 | Neon Genesis Evangelion | Pen Pen | Netflix dub | |
| 2019 | Cells at Work! | Red Blood Cell | | |
| 2019 | To the Abandoned Sacred Beasts | Liza Runecastle | | |
| 2019–20 | Inazuma Eleven: Ares | Norika Umihara | | |
| 2020 | Beastars | Mizuchi | | |
| 2020 | Magia Record | Alina Gray | | Tweet |
| 2020 | Dorohedoro | Noi | | |
| 2020–24 | Tower of God | Anaak Jahad | | |
| 2020 | The 8th Son? Are You Kidding Me? | Louise | | |
| 2020 | Monster Girl Doctor | Skadi Dragenfelt | | |
| 2020 | BNA: Brand New Animal | Michiru Kagemori | | |
| 2020 | Persona 5: The Animation | Makoto Niijima | | |
| 2020–22 | Science Fell In Love, So I Tried To Prove It | Arika Yamamoto | | |
| 2020–23 | Pokémon Journeys: The Series | Chloe Cerise | | |
| 2020 | Fire Force | Amateratsu | | |
| 2020–21 | Black Clover | Loropechika | | |
| 2020–21 | Fruits Basket | Kimi Toudou | | |
| 2020–22 | Ghost in the Shell: SAC 2045 | Purin Esaki | | |
| 2021 | Sakura Wars the Animation | Sakura Amamiya | | |
| 2021 | Bungo Stray Dogs Wan! | Kyoka Izumi | | |
| 2021 | High-Rise Invasion | Maid Mask, Megumi Saito | | |
| 2021 | To Your Eternity | Rean Cropp | | |
| 2021 | Vivy: Fluorite Eye's Song | Yui Kakitani | | |
| 2022 | Komi Can't Communicate | Omoharu Nakanaka, Otori Kaede | | |
| 2022 | Kotaro Lives Alone | Kotaro Satо̄ | Lead role | |
| 2022 | The Case Study of Vanitas | Vanitas (young) | | |
| 2022 | The Yakuza's Guide to Babysitting | Kanami | | |
| 2023–24 | Nier: Automata Ver1.1a | A2 | | |
| 2023 | Digimon Adventure | Sora Takenouchi, MarineAngemon | 2020 series | |
| 2023 | Pluto | Wassily, Florist | | |
| 2023–24 | Bleach: Thousand-Year Blood War | Liltotto Lamperd, Masaki Kurosaki (young), Katen, Mareyo Omaeda, Nonomi Nomino | | |
| 2024–2025 | Go! Go! Loser Ranger! | Pink Keeper, Additional Voices | 4 episodes | |
| 2024–2025 | Mission: Yozakura Family | Futaba Yozakura | 21 episodes | |
| 2024–2025 | Fairy Tail: 100 Years Quest | Lucy Heartfilia | | |

==== Animation ====
List of voice performances in animation
| Year | Title | Role | Notes | Ref(s). |
|---|---|---|---|---|
| 2012- | Zou | Elzee Blackhoof | | |
| 2014 | Doc McStuffins | Curly Q, Nia | | |
| 2017 | Stitch & Ai | Meiying | Co-credited with Xanthe Huynh in all episodes | |
| 2017–18 | RWBY | Ilia Amitola | Volumes 4–6 | |
| 2018 | Goldie & Bear | Billy Gruff | Episode: "Billy the Kid" | |
| 2018 | Star Wars Resistance | Mia Gabon | Episode: "The Recruit" | |
| 2018–present | Miraculous: Tales of Ladybug & Cat Noir | Trixx | Recurring role | |
| 2020–present | Rainbow High | Holly De'Vious; Gabriella Icely | | |
| 2025 | Homestuck: The Animated Pilot | Rose Lalonde | | |

==== Films ====
List of voice performances in direct-to-video and television films
| Year | Title | Role | Notes | Ref(s). |
|---|---|---|---|---|
| 2010 | Dragon Ball: Curse of the Blood Rubies | Pansy | Funimation dub | |
| 2013 | Shakugan no Shana: The Movie | Shana | | |
| 2013 | Fairy Tail the Movie: Phoenix Priestess | Lucy Heartfilia | | |
| 2014 | K: Missing Kings | Douhan Hirasaka | | |
| 2016 | Monster High: Great Scarrier Reef | Pearl Serpentine | | |
| 2017 | Boruto: Naruto the Movie | Sarada Uchiha | | |
| 2017 | Fairy Tail: Dragon Cry | Lucy Heartfilia | | |
| 2020 | A Whisker Away | Miyo "Muge" Sasaki / Tarō | Netflix dub | |
| 2020 | Digimon Adventure: Last Evolution Kizuna | Biyomon, Morphomon | | |
| 2021 | Violet Evergarden: The Movie | Iris Cannary | | |
| 2024 | Digimon Adventure | Little Girl 1A | | |
| 2024 | Digimon Adventure: Our War Game! | Biyomon, Female Employee 2B, Little Girl 2C | | |
| 2024 | Digimon Adventure 02: Digimon Hurricane Touchdown!! / Transcendent Evolution! The Golden Digimentals | Lopmon | | |

List of voice performances in feature films
| Year | Title | Role | Notes | Ref(s). |
|---|---|---|---|---|
| 2012 | Tales of Vesperia: The First Strike | Estellise Sidos Heurassein | | |
| 2014 | Ribbit | Sandy | | |
| 2016 | Psycho-Pass: The Movie | Mika Shimotsuki | | |
| 2016–18 | Digimon Adventure tri. | Maki Himekawa, Biyomon, Yokomon | Six movies, Limited theatrical release | |
| 2017 | Sailor Moon R: The Movie | Sailor Venus | Viz dub Limited theatrical release | |
| 2018 | The Seven Deadly Sins the Movie: Prisoners of the Sky | Ellatte | Netflix film | |
| 2019 | Evangelion Death (True)^{2} | Pen Pen | Netflix dub | |
| 2020 | Marona's Fantastic Tale | Marona | GKIDS dub | |
| 2021 | The Addams Family 2 | Ophelia Strange | Main role | |
| 2021 | Hayop Ka! | Jhermelyn | Netflix dub | |
| 2022 | Drifting Home | Juri Andō, Satoko Tonai | Netflix dub | |
| 2023 | Psycho-Pass Providence | Mika Shimotsuki | Limited theatrical release | |
| 2024 | Mobile Suit Gundam SEED Freedom | Cagalli Yula Athha | | |
| 2026 | All You Need Is Kill | Rachel | | |

==== Other dubbing ====
List of voice performances in other dubbing
| Year | Title | Country | Dubbed from | Role | Live actor | Source |
|---|---|---|---|---|---|---|
| 2016 | Marseille | France | French | Barbara | Carolina Jurczak | |

==== Video games ====
List of voice performances in video games
| Year | Title | Role | Notes | Ref(s). |
|---|---|---|---|---|
| 2009 | Lux-Pain | Nami Kamishiro | | |
| 2012 | Borderlands 2 | Gaige, Veanna Granlund, Kellis Morrison, Norico Sullivan | | |
| 2014 | Borderlands: The Pre-Sequel | Gaige | | |
| 2015 | Danganronpa Another Episode: Ultra Despair Girls | Komaru Naegi | | |
| 2015 | Disgaea 5 | Majorita | | |
| 2015 | Xenoblade Chronicles X | Alexa | | |
| 2016 | Street Fighter V | Fevrier | | |
| 2016 | Shantae: Half-Genie Hero | Rottytops | Friends to the End | |
| 2017 | Fire Emblem Heroes | Caeda, Gwendolyn, Cecilia, Mae, Tsubasa, Rhea, Seiros | | |
| 2017 | Fire Emblem Warriors | Caeda | | |
| 2017 | Fire Emblem Echoes: Shadows of Valentia | Mae | | |
| 2017 | Nier: Automata | A2 | | |
| 2017 | Persona 5 | Makoto Niijima | | |
| 2017 | Akiba's Beat | Kotomi Sanada | | |
| 2017 | Friday the 13th: The Game | Tiffany Cox | | |
| 2017 | Horizon Zero Dawn | Ikrie | | |
| 2018 | Detective Pikachu | Meiko Okamoto | | |
| 2018 | Persona 5: Dancing in Starlight | Makoto Niijima | | |
| 2018 | Epic Seven | Cermia, Lionheart Cermia, Lilibet, Designer Lilibet | | |
| 2018 | League of Legends | Xan Irelia | | |
| 2019 | Conception | Mahiru Konatsuki | | |
| 2019 | The Walking Dead: The Final Season | Minerva | 2 episodes | |
| 2019 | Super Smash Bros. Ultimate | Makoto Niijima | Joker DLC | |
| 2019 | Judgment | Mafuyu Fujii | | |
| 2019 | Fire Emblem: Three Houses | Rhea/Seiros | | |
| 2019 | Catherine: Full Body | Makoto Niijima | Joker DLC | |
| 2019 | Borderlands 3 | Gaige | | |
| 2020 | Space Channel 5 VR: Kinda Funky News Flash! | Ulala, Pudding | | |
| 2020 | Shantae and the Seven Sirens | Rottytops | | |
| 2020 | Persona 5 Royal | Makoto Niijima | | |
| 2020 | Serious Sam 4 | Quinn | | |
| 2020 | The Legend of Heroes: Trails of Cold Steel IV | Arianrhod | | |
| 2020 | Yakuza: Like a Dragon | Ririka | | |
| 2020 | World of Warcraft: Shadowlands | Niya | | |
| 2020 | Cyberpunk 2077 | "V" | | |
| 2021 | Persona 5 Strikers | Makoto Niijima | | |
| 2021 | Akiba's Trip: Hellbound & Debriefed | Satoko Midō | | |
| 2021 | Deathloop | Fia Zborowska | | |
| 2021 | Lost Judgment | Mafuyu Fujii | | |
| 2021 | Tales of Luminaria | Lydie Delacroix | | |
| 2021 | Cookie Run: Kingdom | Cotton Cookie | | |
| 2022 | Stranger of Paradise: Final Fantasy Origin | Princess Sarah | | |
| 2022 | Fortnite | The Imagined | | |
| 2022 | Fire Emblem Warriors: Three Hopes | Rhea/Seiros | | |
| 2022 | Halo Infinite | Prism | | |
| 2022 | Monster Hunter Rise: Sunbreak | Minayle the Blacksmith | | |
| 2023 | Street Fighter 6 | Manon | | |
| 2023 | Diablo IV | Additional Voices | | |
| 2023 | Persona 5 Tactica | Makoto Niijima | | |
| 2023 | Call of Duty: Modern Warfare III | Additional Voices | | |
| 2023 | Naruto x Boruto: Ultimate Ninja Storm Connections | Sarada Uchiha | | |
| 2024 | Persona 3 Reload | Emiri Kanou | | |
| 2024 | Like a Dragon: Infinite Wealth | Additional Voices | | |
| 2024 | Shin Megami Tensei V: Vengeance | Agrat bat Mahlat | Canon of Vengeance | |
| 2024 | Romancing SaGa 2: Revenge of the Seven | Final Emperor (F) | | |
| 2024 | Ys X: Nordics | Karja Balta | | |
| 2025 | Like a Dragon: Pirate Yakuza in Hawaii | Additional voices | | |
| 2025 | Xenoblade Chronicles X: Definitive Edition | Alexa, additional voices | | |
| 2025 | Rune Factory: Guardians of Azuma | Black Dragon, additional voices | | |
| 2025 | Date Everything! | Chairemi | | |
| 2026 | Highguard | Scarlet | | |
| 2026 | Kiln | Celadon | | |

=== Live-action ===
==== Television ====
List of acting performances in television
| Year | Title | Role | Notes | Ref(s). |
|---|---|---|---|---|
| 1996, 1999 | Walker, Texas Ranger | Sally, Amelia Allen | 2 episodes | |
| 2008 | Friday Night Lights | Ginnie Warwick | Episode: "Tami Knows Best" | |
| 2010 | The Deep End | Sarah | 1 episode | |
| 2011–12 | Throwing Stones | Robyn Goode | Web series | |
| 2013 | Bones | Rachel Howes | Episode: "The Spark in the Park" | |
| 2013 | Longmire | Trixie Dalton | Episode: "A Good Death is Hard to Find" | |
| 2014 | Shameless | Robyn Hasseck | Episode: "My Oldest Daughter" | |
| 2014 | The Chair | Herself | Documentary | |
| 2022 | 9-1-1 | Alexis | Episode: "Cursed" | |

==== Films ====
List of acting performances in film
| Year | Title | Role | Notes | Ref(s). |
|---|---|---|---|---|
| 1997 | Holiday in Your Heart | Young LeAnn Rimes | | |
| 2000 | The President's Man | Stacy Anderson | | |
| 2006 | Fast Food Nation | Kim | | |
| 2006 | The Hottest State | Danielle | | |
| 2007 | The Mist | Teenage Girl | | |
| 2010 | Temple Grandin | Marcia | | |
| 2013 | Beyond the Farthest Star | Anne Wells | | |
| 2013 | Cry | Grace | | |
| 2014 | Not Cool | Tori | | |
| 2015 | I Hate Myselfie | Kelly | Short film | |

== Awards and nominations ==
| Year | Award | Category | Work/Recipient | Result | Ref. |
|---|---|---|---|---|---|
| 2021 | 17th British Academy Games Awards | Performer in a Leading Role | Female V (Cyberpunk 2077) | Nominated | |
| 2023 | 7th Crunchyroll Anime Awards | Best Voice Artist Performance (English) | Kotaro Sato (Kotaro Lives Alone) | Nominated | |

| Preceded by Emilie-Claire Barlow | Voice of Sailor Venus; 2014-present | Succeeded by None |
