= Joystick (disambiguation) =

A joystick is a control device.

Joystick may also refer to:

- Side-stick, a flight control device
- Centre stick, a flight control device

== Music ==
- "Joystick" (song), a 1983 single by the Dazz Band
- "Joystick", a 1964 single by The Tornados
- "Joystick", a 2010 song by Simon Curtis from the album 8Bit Heart
- Joystick, a 1983 album by the Dazz Band
- Joystick, a 2002 album by Rockbot

== Other ==
- Joystick (comics), a fictional character in the Marvel Comics universe
- Joysticks (film), a 1983 comedy about a video arcade
- Joystiq, a video game website
- Joystick (magazine), a French magazine
- Slang for penis, the primary sexual organ of male animals
