= Ulala (Space Channel 5) =

- Space Channel 5 character
- Official render of Ulala, from 1999
- First game: Space Channel 5 (1999)
- Created by: Takashi Yuda; Tetsuya Mizuguchi; Jake Kazdel
- Designed by: Yumiko Miyabe; Tetsuya Mizuguchi; Jake Kazdel
- Voiced by: English: Apollo Smile (1999–2014) Cherami Leigh (2020–present); Japanese: Mineko Okamura (1999–present)
- Motion capture: Nazu Nahoko
- Portrayed by: Various: Nazu Nahoko (Japan; 1999–present) Kelly Preston (United States; 2000–2001) Apollo Smile (United States; 2000)

In-universe information
- Nationality: Japanese

Ulala (Japanese: うらら, Hepburn: Urara) is a fictional character, mascot, and the main protagonist of Sega's Space Channel 5 series. Her character was created by Takashi Yuda, Tetsuya Mizuguchi and Jake Kazdel in the late 1990s and debuted in December 1999 with the release of Space Channel 5.

Within the fictional universe of Space Channel 5, Ulala is a reporter for the titular news channel and recurring savior of the galaxy who defeats alien forces with dance moves, alongside rival reporters Pudding and Jaguar. She is assisted by her boss Fuse during live broadcasts and is credited as the most well-known reporter in the Milky Way by her fans and crew members. Ten years prior to the Morolian Invasion of 2499, Ulala was the sole survivor of a deadly spaceship accident that resulted in the death of everyone aboard, including her parents. She was rescued by former Channel 5 reporter Jaguar and later influenced her to become a journalist. Ten years later, Ulala is the star of Ulala's Swingin' Report Show and is determined to solve the mystery of the abrupt alien invasion while taking part in dance battles against rival reporters.

Ulala's reception remains generally positive among video game journalists and critics, receiving praise for her characterization, personality, design, voice, and heroism. Due to her popularity during the 2000s, Ulala was featured in several other Sega-published video games, as well as promotional material in other media, which included television appearances, several lines of collectible merchandise of the character, and video game cameos. She also served as a mascot for the Sega Dreamcast before its discontinuation. In more recent years, Ulala is often regarded as one of Sega's greatest characters, and a video game icon, by both the fanbase and critics alike. In the year 2000, Ulala was nominated for the "Original Game Character of the Year" by the International Game Developers Association.

== Concept and creation ==
Early concepts for Ulala created by artist Jake Kazdel

Ulala was conceived by Takashi Yuda, who also came up with her name. She was originally conceived to be a male character, and was not present in the original 1997 concept video for Space Channel 5. Although the games were originally conceived to appeal to female gamers, the developers of Space Channel 5 also wanted Ulala to have a unique sexual appeal for male audiences. The designers aimed for her sex appeal to be "subtle," and aimed to try and reflect how clothes would be in 500 years, explaining that Ulala's underwear showing at some times was not as big a deal in this future. Ulala's model has a low polygon count, which lead to her sex appeal being defined through her movement according to Mizuguchi. When picking the colors of Ulala's outfit, the development team behind the original 1999 game used orange and blue, to represent the colors of the Dreamcast logo and corporate color of Sega Japan respectively.

Sega had high expectations for Ulala as a character due to a combination of their belief in her designer, Tetsuya Mizuguchi, as well as Space Channel 5's unique visuals. Peter Moore noted Sega's interest to make Ulala a "star" who could feature in different games after Space Channel 5, despite American audiences' relative lukewarm reception to her. According to Apollo Smile, Tina Landon (Janet Jackson's choreographer) was one of the women used to rotoscope some of Ulala's earlier animations. Brent Suzuki, a character from Space Channel 5, suggests that Ulala suffers from herpetophobia.

=== Casting and portrayal ===
Kae Īda was originally cast as the Japanese voice of Ulala in Space Channel 5, but was later recast as rival character Pudding and replaced by Mineko Okamura. According to Īda, the recasting happened after the development team had an opportunity to demonstrate the test version of Space Channel 5 for the media to preview at the same time as the audition. Feedback from the media representatives towards Okamura's performance as Ulala was very enthusiastic, and she was retained as the character's final voice.

Mizuguchi found casting an English voice actress difficult due to him struggling to find someone with "good voice talent" and dancing ability. As such, they went through a number of auditions. Ulala was originally voiced by Apollo Smile in the English version of Space Channel 5, and her dancer and choreographer was Nazu Nahoko.

To secure Apollo Smile's involvement in a new game, the developers of Space Channel 5 VR: Kinda Funky News Flash! put out a "public appeal requesting information" about her, stating that she is what made Ulala "special from the very beginning." They were able to find Smile but were unable to secure her for this role, choosing instead to feature a sound-alike, later revealed to be Cherami Leigh.

== Appearances ==
=== Space Channel 5 series ===
Ulala appears as the main protagonist of the Space Channel 5 series, appearing in all of its canon material and spin-offs. She makes her first video game appearance in the 1999 video game, Space Channel 5, where she becomes a reporter guided by her boss Fuse and attempts to undercover the truth behind the Morolian Invasion of 2499. In an attempt to undercover the reasonings, she is forced to battle rival reporters Jaguar and Pudding, both of which have similar goals but different reasonings behind it. After revealing the truth behind the Morolian Invasion with the help of Jaguar, the three reporters make their way the Chief Blank — the mastermind behind the invasion who forced the Morolians into kidnapping and hypnotizing the humans. Ulala ultimately follows him to the roof, where she and the others attempt to defeat Giant Evila but ends up being the last defender. In the end, Blank confesses to being the mastermind, where he leads Ulala to the Blank Dimension. With the help of her fans and friends, Ulala defeats the evil CEO and leads a march the end of the galaxy. After defeating the Morolians, Ulala has become Channel 5's top reporter, and assigned as orientator three years later.

Ulala returns in Space Channel 5: Part 2, where she must stop the Rhythm Rogues from taking over the galaxy, and their mysterious leader Purge. The game is set a few months after the first game, and Ulala is now known as one of the galaxy's finest reporters. When Peace, the president of the Milky Way, is kidnapped by the band of robots, Ulala takes it upon herself to report the incident and undergo an investigation. When a ransom for the president is held by Purge, several reporters, including Ulala and Pudding, attempt to make it to the handout point before being turned around by Pine and the Eastern Venus Space Police. Ulala and Channel 5 make it pass the police, but immediately head back to the studio when it is realized the ransom was fabricated and the Rhythm Rogues are actually at Channel 5's base. When arriving, Ulala saves Space Michael Jackson but fails to defeat Purge, who presumably killed Fuse and resulted in the destruction of the base. In her moment of triumph, Ulala and her allies find Purge's hideout, save Jaguar, and discover the Rhythm Rogues are planning galaxy domination. Ulala, her allies, and her fans ultimately defeat the Rhythm Rogues and lead a march to the end of the galaxy as a form of celebration.

=== Other appearances ===
Ulala also appears in the virtual reality game Space Channel 5 VR: Kinda Funky News Flash, where players play a reporter (Roo or Kie) shadowing Ulala on the job while they undercover the recent transformation of the Morolians turned Othermoros, and the mysterious leader known as Glitter. She makes appearances in all Space Channel 5 spin-offs, including Ulala's Channel J, Space Channel 5: Ulala's Cosmic Attack, and Dreamcast Collection.

Ulala makes several appearances outside the Space Channel 5 series. She made her first non-Space Channel 5 playable appearance in Beach Spikers as a secret playable character. She also made another playable appearance in the Wii version of Samba de Amigo, alongside Sonic the Hedgehog. In 2008, she appeared as a choosable coach in Sega Splash Golf. Her attire appears as a selectable skin in Chaos Heroes Online for the character Silk. Ulala and Pudding's outfits also make cameo appearances in PlayStation's 2024 video game, Astro Bot.

Ulala and Pudding have also made notable appearances in the Sega All-Stars series, Ulala appearing as a playable character in every entry, including Sega Superstars, Sega Superstars Tennis, Sonic & Sega All-Stars Racing, and Sonic & Sega All-Stars Racing Transformed. She also appears in all versions of each game. In 2012 and 2015, she appeared as a solo unit in Project X Zone and Project X Zone 2, as well as a main protagonist. As a unit, she can summon Opa-Opa, Harrier, and Alex Kidd — other Sega protagonists.

Ulala has been featured in several Sonic the Hedgehog video games as both a playable character and cameo. She makes her first appearance in the series in the 2006 racing game Sonic Riders as a secret playable character, voiced by Apollo Smile. She makes cameo appearances in Sonic Riders: Zero Gravity (as a poster) and Sonic Colors: Ultimate (as a player icon).

Ulala was to appear in a Space Channel 5 television show for MTV, where she would host an animated news report program with several other Space Channel 5 cast members. However, the show was canceled and only a promotional commercial of the pilot episode was released. Columbia Pictures also had plans to create a Space Channel 5 movie, but development did not proceed.

Ulala makes a handful of appearances in the animated series Hi-sCoool! SeHa Girls. During a lesson set in Space Channel 5, Ulala appears to help the Sega Hard Girls defeat the Morolians and rescue their friends. She later appears in the final episode to wish the girls farewell at their graduation.

In 2022, Sega announced on Twitter that they would be developing a movie, alongside Picturestart, based on the first two Space Channel 5 video games, following the success of the first two Sonic the Hedgehog films.

== Promotional and merchandise ==
Dancers depicting Ulala were featured at the E3 2000 event to promote Space Channel 5. Ulala also appeared in a CG form at the 2000 MTV Music Awards to present the award for Best Dance Video. Sega organized an Ulala look-alike contest during the early 2000s, where people were given the opportunity to win $500 and a Dreamcast if their Ulala cosplay was deemed the best. Ulala was portrayed in this contest by Kelly Preston. Sega received a request from PG&E to use Ulala on a sanitary napkin advertisement. Several Space Channel 5 and Ulala-themed promotional material made an appearance in the 2001 film Josie and the Pussycats as a way to promote both the game and character. She additionally made a brief cameo appearance at The Game Show Awards in 2021.

Ulala has been featured in a variety of highly collectible merchandise upon her debut, including a dress-up magnet. She has also received multiple figurines, including two Figmas from the Good Smile Company, each one having a different outfit based on the first and second games. Palisades Toys released a line of Space Channel 5 figures in 2001, six of which were based on Ulala and her in-game outfits, one of which coming with a limited edition lunchbox.

== Reception and legacy ==
Ulala has received a generally positive reception, referred to as an icon by Liam Martin of Digital Spy and IGN staff. Ulala was nominated in 2000 for "Original Game Character of the Year" by the International Game Developers Association, while she was voted as one of the top ten favorite Sega characters in a fan poll.IGN staff anticipated that Ulala would be a character who stands out among American players, while later declaring that she is such a "strong character" that her design would be "instantly recognizable" on any kind of product. Plan B Magazine staff speculated that the Dreamcast's commercial failure was what prevented the character from achieving greater heights of popularity. Neboisa Radakovic of Game Revolution and Charles Herold of The New York Times both praised her for her fashion sense, with the latter stating that she is "enough by herself" to garner someone's interest in Space Channel 5. In 2010, Ulala was praised in the guide book, 1001 Video Games You Must Play Before You Die, calling her the "queen of the galaxy" and a "deee-lightful" protagonist—the latter being a nod to the character's lawsuit. Daniel Trock for The Gamer ranked Ulala the tenth deadliest dancing character in a video game, writing: "With her groovy moves, Ulala can control the pace of a battle, enrapturing friend and foe alike with impeccable style, then busting out her blaster when their guard is down." The Gamer also featured the character in their "10 Best Sega Characters of All Time," commenting positively on her association to the Dreamcast and her "iconic" design. Game Rant wrote positively on the character, ranking her 9th in their list of "10 Underrated Sega Heroes," writing: "While other civilians run screaming from the danger, [Ulala] calmly struts towards it. It's a fearless dedication to journalism that would make Lois Lane proud."

The character's animation and personality in Space Channel 5 and Space Channel 5: Part 2 has received commendation. Allegra Frank of Polygon praised her animations, particularly her defeated animation, as "super realistic." She also found her "sore loser" personality relatable. GamesTM staff praised her as "irresistible" and well-loved by "everyone," praising her motion-capture movements for giving the game its appeal and bemoaning how she has fallen into obscurity. Marc Saltzman for Entertainment Weekly complimented her personality, saying "gamers of all ages undoubtedly will want to help Ulala get her groove back — if not get their hands on a pair of those boots."

Her sex appeal has received a generally positive reception. Travis Fahs of IGN felt she was one of the most "appealing" female characters since Lara Croft, while Official Sega Dreamcast Magazine US staff felt that her sex appeal made Lara seem less appealing. Entertainment Weekly cited her as "a digital diva who may well dethrone Lara Croft as the sexiest star of the small screen." Retro Gamer staff praised her as "the sexiest videogame character" at the time of her debut for her clothing, voice, and hair. However, Elona A. Boggs of Current Sauce criticized her as "offensive to women," and claimed that the character's emphasis on her appearance over her powers does "reflect[s] very little about female empowerment." Following the lawsuit against the character, CJ Andriessen of Destructoid labelled her as a "blatant Lady Kier rip-off."

=== Cultural impact ===
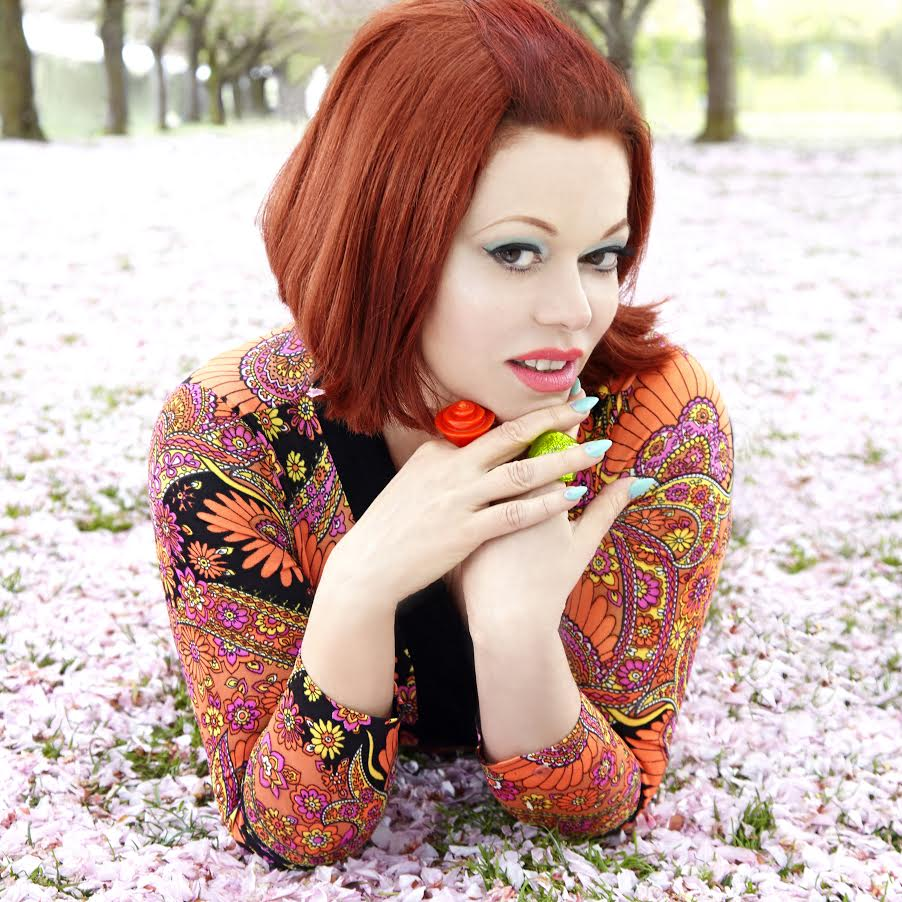
Kierin Kirby, American singer and songwriter (pictured), filed the lawsuit against Sega in 2003.

Sega was the defendant in the lawsuit Kirby v. Sega of America, Inc. in 2003 by Kierin Kirby (also known as Lady Miss Kier, lead singer of pop/dance group Deee-Lite). Kier alleged that the number of similarities was too great, citing dress, hair, and makeup. She further alleged that "viewers, listeners, and consumers" were and are likely to confuse the two. She claimed that Sega had offered her $15,000 between May and July 2000 for her "likeness, image, and name" to be used in a video game. She sought $750,000 in damages. In 2006, the lawsuit was dismissed, with the court determining that Ulala's design (such as her "anime" art style, height difference, and different style of dance) and Lady Miss Kier's appearance were different enough to be "transformative." The court applied Comedy III Productions, Inc. v. Gary Saderup, Inc. in its ruling, noting that Lady Kier was "at best the raw material" for Ulala. The court found that the "public interest in free artistic expression" outweighed the risk of public confusion between Kier and Ulala's designs.

In 2024, singer-songwriter Kim Petras, a longtime fan of the franchise, dressed as Ulala in her orange suit from the original game for Halloween. She revealed her costume in the form of a cinematic recreation of the game on TikTok and Instagram.
