= Ken Woodman =

British musician

- Died: 2000
- Genres: Jazz

Ken (Kenny) Woodman was a British composer and trumpeter. He was famous for the song "Town Talk", which was used as the theme song for Paul Kaye's shows on the pirate radio station Radio London, and later as the theme song for Jimmy Young on BBC Radio 2. He posthumously became famous for the song "Mexican Flyer", which was originally released on the Ken Woodman and his Picadilly Brass album That's Nice in 1966. "Mexican Flyer" was used as the theme song for Space Channel 5, and was included in the soundtrack of Samba de Amigo and Swing Girls. He was also music arranger for Shirley Bassey, Tom Jones and famously for Sandie Shaw, where he arranged and conducted "Puppet on a String" at the Eurovision Song Contest. Kenny Woodman was a musician in the Royal Marine Band, during WW2 and arranged a lot of their music in the early 1950s before moving into the music business.
