= Holiday in Your Heart =

- Based on: Holiday in Your Heart by LeAnn Rimes and Tom Carter
- Teleplay by: Ellen Weston
- Directed by: Michael Switzer
- Starring: LeAnn Rimes; Bernadette Peters; Rebecca Schull
- Music by: Michael Tavera
- Original language: English

Production
- Producers: Richard D. Arredondo; Ted Babcock; Stephanie Germain; Peter Sadowski; Robert M. Sertner; Randy Sutter; Frank von Zerneck
- Cinematography: William Wages
- Running time: 120 minutes

Original release
- Network: ABC
- Release: December 14, 1997

Holiday in Your Heart is a 1997 Christmas fantasy drama television film starring LeAnn Rimes. The movie is based on a story written by Rimes and Tom Carter, and co-stars Bernadette Peters as a country singer. The movie aired on ABC on December 14, 1997.

== Plot ==
The story is told as part realistic, part fable. A young country singer, LeAnn Rimes, playing herself, prepares to make her debut at the Grand Ole Opry at Christmas. However, her beloved grandmother is hospitalized and LeAnn is faced with a difficult decision. While trying to reconcile her new-found stardom with her family obligations she meets Faith Shawn (Bernadette Peters), a once-famous country singer. Faith decides to mentor LeAnn, showing her the history of country music.

Faith relates a poignant family story to LeAnn. In a flash-back, Faith and her band are seen stuck on a bus in a snow-storm. Faith, a diabetic, is given insulin by a stranger, who dies overnight. He is later revealed to be her father, who she had not spoken to in many years. Faith and her husband Carl erect a monument to that fateful event. Faith's subtle message is about the importance of family.

As she is finally about to sing at the Grand Ole Opry, LeAnn tells her parents about meeting Faith, and she discovers that Faith and Carl died in an accident after getting struck by Lightning.

Faith and LeAnn sing a duet, "Crazy", and Rimes also sings "One Way Ticket (Because I Can)", and "Blue." "On the Side of Angels" is sung by Peters and others during the snow-storm. "Holiday in Your Heart" aired on My Life Time on December 22, 2010.

== Cast ==
- LeAnn Rimes as herself
- Bernadette Peters as Faith Shawn
- Rebecca Schull as Grandma Teeden
- Vernon Grote as Avery
- Carol Farabee as Audrey
- Harlan Jordan as Grandpa Luther
- Charles Homet as Guitar Player
- Rance Howard as Blind Man
- Cherami Leigh as Young LeAnn Rimes
- Elizabeth Perry as Screaming Fan
- Mark Walters as Carl
- Rodger Boyce as Burly Man
- Megan Cole as Young Faith
- John William Galt as Santa
- Gil Glasgow as Bus Driver
- Alana Grace as Young Child
- Tommy G. Kendrick as Jason
- Curtis Randall as Larry
- Kellie Rasberry as Tutor

== Production ==
Rimes and Tom Carter wrote the part autobiographical, part fictional book Holiday in Your Heart after being approached by Doubleday. ABC then asked her to do a movie based on the book. Bernadette Peters was cast because, Rimes said, she is "a wonderful actress", not for crossover appeal.

The movie was filmed in Dallas, Texas.

== Music ==
1. One Way Ticket (Because I Can) by LeAnn Rimes (Keith Hinton, Judy Rodman)
2. Blue by LeAnn Rimes (Bill Mack)
3. Crazy by LeAnn Rimes (Willie Nelson)
4. On The Side Of Angels by Bernadette Peters (Faith Shawn) (Gary Burr, Gerry House)
5. Amazing Grace by LeAnn Rimes (John Newton)
6. Broken Wing by LeAnn Rimes (Phil Barnhart, Sam Hogin, James House)
7. On The Side Of Angels by LeAnn Rimes (Gary Burr, Gerry House)
8. Put A Little Holiday In Your Heart by LeAnn Rimes (Greg Wojohn, Roger Wojohn, Scott Wojohn)

== Response ==
The Houston Chronicle reviewer wrote that this is "the ideal TV movie to launch this 15-year-old's acting career. It's her own story. And, in a stroke of sugarplum casting, Bernadette Peters is there to help her tell it. Peters sings with her, too, and they're sensational."

== Awards and nominations ==
- Motion Picture Sound Editors
  - Best Sound Editing - Television Movies of the Week - Music—Susan Mick (WON)

== See also ==
- List of Christmas films
