= Rockbot =

Rockbot is an American music group from Richmond, Virginia, with a sound self-defined as "Atari rock", combining synth pop, video game sound effects, and heavy metal music. As bassist Jonathan Sullivan, formerly with the group Jack's Mannequin, and guitarist Clark Fraley joined to form the band, they wished to feature a female singer, and were introduced to New York-based Apollo Smile. Reinforced by Bryan Stiglich on drums, Adam Thomas on Moog synthesizer, and guitarist Steve Burner, Rockbot went on to record debut extended play Joystick in 2002. In 2003, Smile departed the band and was replaced with Kelli Hoosack. That year, they released their first full-length, Atari Rock. In January 2004, Laura Thomas took the vocal role and also added keyboards.

In 2006, Thomas, Fraley and guitarist Steve Burner left to form their own band, The Sort.

== Discography ==
=== Atari Rock ===
- "Know This"
- "Blaze Green"
- "Just Fine"
- "Dennis Scott"
- "Comes To Us"
- "Cops"
- "Passed Out"
- "Without You"
- "Bomb Song"
- Artist: Rockbot
- Album: Atari Rock
- Released: 2003
- Credits:
  - Jonathan Sullivan - vocals, bass
  - Kelli Hoosack - vocals
  - Clark Fraley - guitar
  - Steve Burner - guitar, vocals
  - Bryan Stiglich - drums
  - Adam Thomas - synth
  - Jenny Vasques - guest vocals on Bomb Song

Recorded by Laferrera @ the Recorditorium. Mastered by rainmaker all songs copyright Rockbot 2003 except "You dropped a bomb on me".

=== Joystick ===
- "Passed Out"
- "Bong Song"
- "Puzzle"
- "Wack"
- "Breathe"
- Artist: Rockbot
- Album: Joystick
- Released: 2002
- Credits:
  - Jonathan Sullivan - bass, vox, whammy bass
  - Clark Fraley - guitar
  - Apollo Smile - vox
  - Adam Thomas - moog, sinakone
- "all guitars by C. Fraley"
- "all synths by J.Sullivan, C.Fraley"
- Brian Stiglich - drums
- drums "passed out", "breathe", "puzzle" by Justin Riccio
- drums "wack" by Bryan Stiglich
- drums "bong song" by Tony Thaxton
- drums "wack", "bong song" recorded by Ben Catania @ Digital pig studios, RVA
- drums "passed out", "breathe", "puzzle" recorded by Jeremy Smith at The Slave Pit, RVA
- vox recorded by Stephen Tjaden @ Funhouse Studios, NYC
- mixed by lafff @ Sound of Music Studios, RVA
- mastered by Chris Douthit @ Bump your head studios, RVA
- everything else recorded @ teletran 1 studios, Oregon Hill
