= Space Channel 5: Part 2 =

2002 video game

- Japanese Dreamcast box art
- Developer: United Game Artists (Note: Ported to PlayStation 3, Xbox 360 and Windows by Sega Studio China)
- Publishers: JP: Sega (Note: Also publisher for 2011 remastered version); EU: Sony Computer Entertainment; NA: Agetec (Note: Special Edition)
- Director: Yumiko Miyabe
- Producer: Tetsuya Mizuguchi
- Designer: Takumi Yoshinaga
- Programmer: Hitoshi Nakanishi
- Artist: Mayumi Moro
- Writer: Takumi Yoshinaga
- Composers: Naofumi Hataya; Kenichi Tokoi; Tomoya Ohtani; Mariko Nanba
- Series: Space Channel 5
- Platforms: Dreamcast, PlayStation 2, PlayStation 3, Microsoft Windows, Xbox 360
- Release: February 14, 2002: Dreamcast; JP: February 14, 2002 PlayStation 2; JP: February 14, 2002; EU: February 12, 2003; NA: November 18, 2003 Microsoft Windows; WW: February 22, 2011 PlayStation 3; NA: October 4, 2011; EU: October 5, 2011; JP: October 5, 2011 Xbox 360; WW: October 5, 2011
- Genre: Music
- Modes: Single player Multiplayer

Space Channel 5: Part 2 (Note: Japanese: スペースチャンネル5 パート2, Hepburn: Supēsu Channeru Faibu Pāto Tsū) is a 2002 music video game developed by United Game Artists and published by Sega for Dreamcast and PlayStation 2. It is a sequel to the 1999 game Space Channel 5. The game received a high-definition port to Microsoft Windows, Xbox 360 and PlayStation 3 in 2011.

In a space age future, reporter Ulala takes on a group called the Rhythm Rogues and their leader Purge when they unleash a dancing madness on the galaxy. As Ulala, players engage in rhythm-based combat through scripted levels where Ulala mimics the actions of rivals in time to musical tracks. Alongside the single-player story campaign, the game includes an endurance mode called Ulala's Dance and a multiplayer option for both modes.

Part 2 was produced over two years by many of the same staff; it was the team's last game prior to being merged with Sonic Team, and the last produced by Tetsuya Mizuguchi prior to leaving Sega in 2003. Shifting to 3D graphics from the pre-rendered videos of the first game, Mizuguchi included several features based on the team's wishes and feedback from the first game. The music was composed over the course of a year, and spawned four soundtrack albums. The game was a critical and commercial success, with many critics citing it as superior to the original due to its improved gameplay and more varied soundtrack.

== Synopsis and gameplay ==
A shooting section of the second level of Space Channel 5: Part 2

Space Channel 5: Part 2 is a music video game featuring similar gameplay to its predecessor. Players take on the role of Ulala, a reporter working for the titular news channel in a 1960s-styled science fiction future filled with competing news channels. After a gang called the Rhythm Rogues led by Purge and his subordinate Shadow attack people with a dancing madness, Ulala is sent to both report on events, while clashing with rival reporters and local authorities, and defeat the Rhythm Rogues' plans. The Rhythm Rogues kidnap Space President Peace, steal transmitters from other news stations to amplify their dancing signal, and destroy Space Channel 5's base. After defeating Shadow, revealed to a former ally under hypnosis, Ulala defeats Purge.

Players control Ulala through six 3D levels, with some levels having specific gimmicks such as band instrument-based battles or mimicking picture poses. The aim in each level is to defeat enemies, win boss encounters, and rescue citizens. All gameplay has Ulala mimicking the movements and vocalisations of her opponents (compared by journalists to the game Simon Says). There are six buttons that match actions on-screen; the directional pad buttons, and two action buttons which are presented with the respective vocalizations "chu" and "hey".

Levels are divided into dancing and shooting areas; during the shooting sections, Ulala uses "chu" to defeat enemies and "hey" to free hostages. There are many variations present during these sections; button prompts must be timed in some songs with lyrics, and some long notes require the player to hold down a button. Alongside standard battles, Ulala has battle-style sections where she uses a musical instrument. During these sections, the player pressing "down" on the directional pad and action buttons.

Ratings, shown in the bottom left-hand corner of the screen, increase with each good performance and discovering secret moves. Ulala's health is represented as hearts in standard gameplay, with the game ending if Ulala runs out of hearts. The heart count can be increased with good performance. The rate of success during any section changes Ulala's dancing and backing music to reflect this, with more rescues and successful dances increasing Ulala's party and musical variety, while errors cause Ulala's dancing to flag and the music to simplify. During boss encounters, the current rating is converted into stars which act as a health meter, and remaining stars at the end of a boss fight are converted into ratings.

An additional mode outside the main campaign is "Ulala's Dance", a 100-stage endurance battle where Ulala only has a single heart. Successful performance in Ulala's Dance, in addition to finding hidden moves in standard levels, unlocks costumes and accessories for Ulala. Part 2 also supports multiplayer; one player controls the directional pad, while the other controls the action buttons.

== Development ==
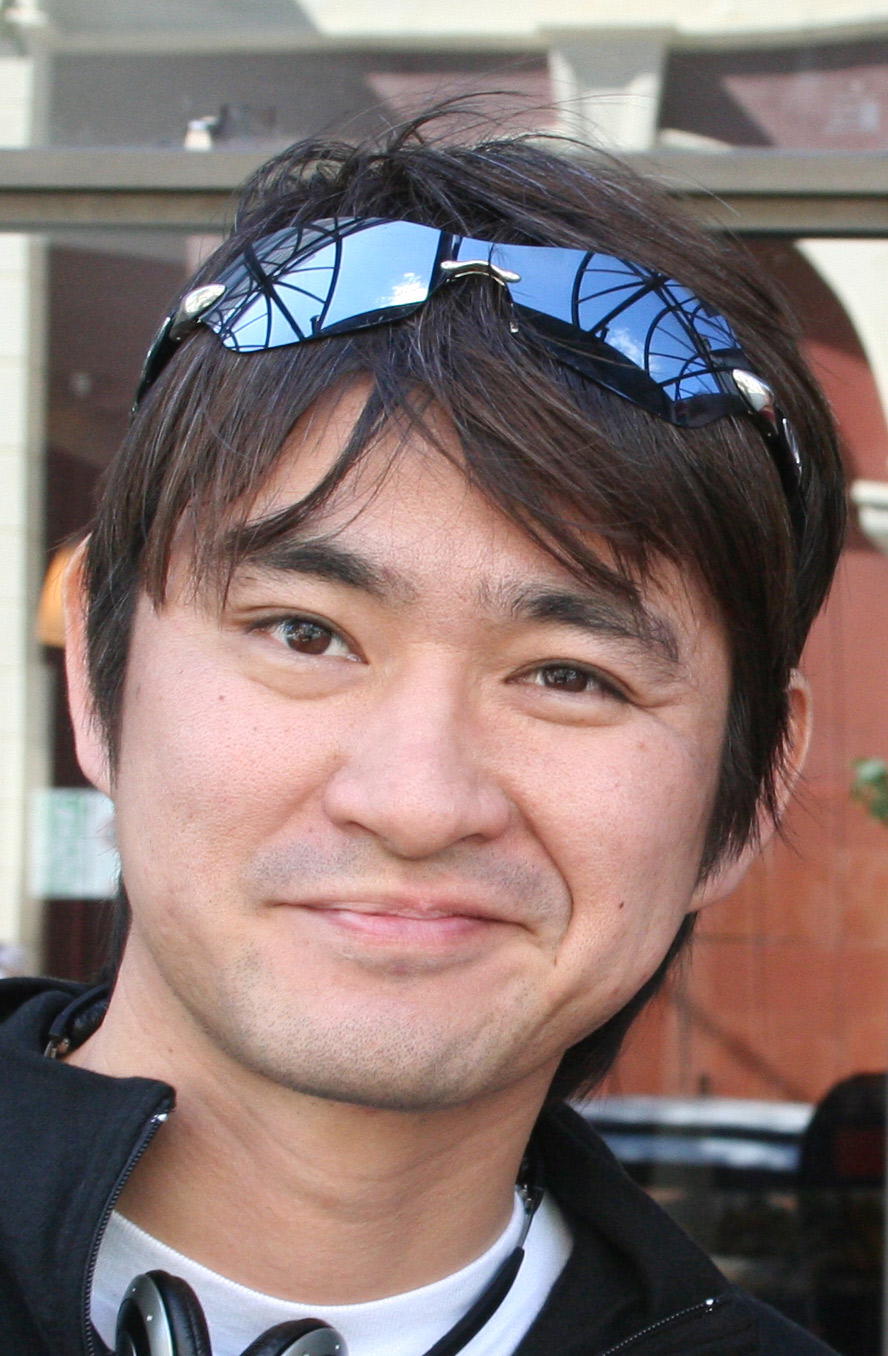
Tetsuya Mizuguchi, founder of AM Annex, which later became United Game Artists

A sequel to Space Channel 5 was planned from an early stage, but production was put on hold until Western sales figures came in. Despite these low sales, it was much easier for Tetsuya Mizuguchi to pitch the sequel to Sega as they were now familiar with the genre and gameplay. As with the first game, production was handled by Sega's subsidiary studio United Game Artists. Production lasted around two years. Returning staff included Mizuguchi as producer, original art director Yumiko Miyabe as director, lead designer and writer Takumi Yoshinaga, and artist Mayumi Moro as art director. During its development, the team knew Sega's console production days would end with the Dreamcast. While the original game was developed first for Dreamcast and production was focused on this version, Part 2 saw simultaneous development for Dreamcast and PS2 and was the second game developed by the team for Sony's console. Space Channel 5: Part 2 was the last title developed by United Game Artists prior to Sega's internal restructuring in 2003, when it was incorporated into the newly formed Sonic Team studio. It was also Mizuguchi's last game at Sega prior to leaving following the restructure and founding Q Entertainment.

The original atmosphere, described as "retro sci-fi", was retained for the sequel. Several early planned elements, such as a censorship group which would interrupt broadcasts they deemed unsuitable and the main villain being a galaxy-conquering alien force, were cut from the game as they made the plot overly large and complicated. Ulala's outfit saw a color change from its original orange to white. While the first game used polygonal real-time models over FMV sequences, the environments in Part 2 were fully 3D. There were several given reasons for this; the team were more familiar with the Dreamcast hardware and so were able to create 3D environments, they wanted to shift away from the pre-rendered style of Space Channel 5 which Mizuguchi described as "really tough" to create, and they wanted to create a more cinematic experience for players. Based on feedback from the first game, the team added more extras such as alternate costumes and accessories. A notable new element to gameplay was the instrument-based battles, which proved difficult for the developers to fine-tune.

To ensure creative control over the voice performances and foreseeing last-minute changes, the game's staff voiced the characters as with the first game. The voice actors performed their lines alongside the musical tracks to get the timing right. The process was handled by the game's sound team and overseen by Mizuguchi. The game featured an appearance from Michael Jackson, who played himself as a character called Space Michael and is voiced only in English across both the Japanese and English voices. Having previously appeared in the first game as a brief cameo after being impressed by a pre-release version, he was given a much-expanded role in the sequel. The first game's director, Takashi Yuda, returned to voice the character Fuze; as did Ulala's respective actresses in Japanese (United Game Artists staff member Mineko Okamura) and English (Apollo Smile).

=== Music ===
The music for Part 2 was co-composed by Naofumi Hataya, Kenichi Tokoi, Tomoya Ohtani and Mariko Nanba. Hataya and Tokoi returned from the first game, with Hataya also acting as sound producer. The game was Ohtani's third project as a composer after his work on Sonic Adventure 2 and ChuChu Rocket!. Nanba was brought aboard the project in May 2001, and was initially overwhelmed by both the project and the game's musical style. Same as with the first game, the music was influenced by big band jazz of the 1960s and 70s. Production of the music lasted an entire year due to its core part in the gameplay, and the multiple adjustments. It proved so turbulent at times that Hataya was off sick for a week with stomach troubles, and there were several periods of overtime.

The main theme was "Mexican Flyer", composed by Ken Woodman in 1966, returning from the first game. The lyrics for the songs were written by Yoshinaga. For battles, rival characters were given different instruments. The first rhythm battle created was against rival reporter Pudding, who uses a guitar. Earlier concepts were planned for a percussion opening, having a faster tempo than the released version; Hataya and Yoshinaga collaborated on the track for a long time. The percussion was moved to a different boss character called Pine. The ending theme "This is my Happiness" was composed by Hataya, who was given the direction by Mizuguchi for a low-key theme about happiness. The lyrics were written in English by Tomoko Sasaki.

The soundtrack saw multiple album releases; two of the originals had three of the six reports, additionally from tracks from Ulala's Dance mode with vocals. The songs retained their lyrics for the album release, although they would have given musical elements. The two albums, respectively titled Chu!! and Hey!!, were published on April 10 and 24, 2002 by Marvelous Entertainment and distributed by VAP. Two remix albums were also released, featuring both arrangements of tracks from Part 2 and short audio dramas; Uki Uki Non-Stop Mega Mix on June 21 and Moji Moji Can't Stop Remix on June 24. Tracks from Part 2 were included in the compilation album Space Channel 5 20th Anniversary: Gyungyun Selection by UMA on December 18, 2019.

== Release ==
The game was officially announced by Sega for both Dreamcast and PlayStation 2 in October 2001, shortly before that year's Tokyo Game Show. Sega organized several events to promote the game at demo events across Japan. The game was released in Japan on February 14, 2002, for both Dreamcast and PS2. The Dreamcast version was sold as an exclusive to the Sega's online store Dreamcast Direct. A pre-order bonus was a pair of earphones trimmed with pale fur and a special case for the GD-ROM disc. The PS2 version later received a budget PS2 the Best release on December 12. The Dreamcast version remains exclusive to Japan, and in the years since its release has become a collector's item fetching high resale prices.

The localization was troublesome for Sega due to the song lyrics; they needed to translate it into English while keeping the meaning and roughly the same number of syllables. The PS2 version was co-published in Europe as a standalone release by Sega and Sony. The PS2 version released in mainland Europe on February 12, 2003. It received a limited edition in the region, featuring a pair of silver headphones and carrying case. Its UK and Ireland release was canceled by Sony and Sega, who originally gave no clear explanation. Later, it was revealed that the regional release was cancelled due to resurgent publicity surrounding abuse allegations against Jackson. Part 2 only released in North America as part of the PS2 exclusive Special Edition release of the original Space Channel 5, with Part 2 being on the second disc. This version was published by Agetec on November 18, 2003.

Part 2 later received a high definition port as part of Sega's Dreamcast Collection. This version was released on Microsoft Windows and Xbox 360 on February 22, 2011, in North America and February 25 in Europe. The Windows version also offered a standalone purchase option via Steam. This release was the game's first appearance in the UK. The game later received a standalone digital release for Xbox 360 on October 4 and PlayStation 3 on October 5. The console version released in Japan for both platforms on October 5. The Steam version was patched in 2014, fixing technical and control issues, and including achievements.

== Reception ==
Reception

Aggregate scores
Aggregator	Score
GameRankings	80.67%
Metacritic	79/100 (PS2); 78/100 (360)

Review scores
Publication	Score
1Up.com	8/10
Famitsu	9/10, 8/10, 9/10, 9/10
Game Informer	8.25/10
GamePro	4.5/5
GameSpot	6.9/10
GameSpy	4.5/5
IGN	7.4/10
Play Magazine	4/5
GMR	8/10

Upon its release in Japan, Part 2 topped sales charts. According to Mizuguchi, the game sold around 50,000 copies during its first week, then remained steady in the charts in subsequent weeks rather than the expected sharp drop-off of other titles. Unlike both Space Channel 5 and the studio's other title Rez, the PS2 version of Part 2 was a commercial success; 150,000 units were sold in Japan alone.

The game received positive reviews from critics, receiving praise for its major improvements compared to its predecessor. The magazine also inducted the game into their Platinum Hall of Fame. Game Informer writer, Justin Leeper, complimented the game for being harder than its predecessor and offering more replay value. Andrew Reiner provided a second opinion for Game Informer stating that Part 2—while not as memorable as the original—was still highly enjoyable. Brad Shoemaker of GameSpot, despite mechanical similarities, cited Part 2 as the better entry of the two due to added mechanics and the broader range of music despite uneven voice acting and singing. Shoemaker cited the guitar battle between Ulala and Pudding as one of the game's more amusing and noticeable highlights.

Christian Nutt, writing for GameSpy, praised the sequel for an improved visual style and musical variety; he particularly noted Jackson's inclusion, saying the cameo highlighted his professional skill. Nich Maragos of 1UP.com praised the music, stating it was better than its predecessor for providing more variety and matching the music to the tone of its scenes. Maragos further elaborated when reviewing the game for GMR calling the music tighter, and the animation and gameplay improved to the point that he wished the first game had been similar. GamePro said that Agetec should be lauded for their efforts in bringing both games over in a single package.

IGN's Douglass Perry said that Part 2 fixed the first game's faults and added new elements to enhance the gameplay. He praised the more ambitious presentation, expanded musical styles and greater scope of content. Peter Garden of Play Magazine enjoyed the sequel far more than its predecessor, citing the upgrade to full 3D graphics and improvements to input responses. Reviewers of the Special Edition release in North America praised this version due to including both games for a low price.

Reviews of the Dreamcast Collection version were less positive, though most criticisms focused on the collection as a whole. IGN's Levi Buchanan called the game's tone "forced" compared to its predecessor, as it tried outdoing the earlier game's "weird" tone. Keza MacDonald, writing for Eurogamer, complained of subpar sound quality and technical issues, which were present on the entire collection. By contrast, Jahanzeb Khan of PALGN cited it as the best game in the collection, but was disappointed that the collection did not include the original Dreamcast version.
