= Wild Cardz =

Japanese manga series

Jaja馬!カルテット (Jaja-uma Quartet)
- Genre: Action, Adventure, Comedy
- Manga
- Written by: Noritaka Suzuki
- Published by: Minori Shobo
- Magazine: Monthly Out, Magazine MEGU
- Original run: October 1995 – May 1997
- Original video animation
- Directed by: Yasuchika Nagaoka
- Studio: BMG Victor, Movic, Studio OX
- Licensed by: NA: Central Park Media
- Released: May 21, 1997 – September 26, 1997
- Runtime: 29 minutes per episode
- Episodes: 2

Wild Cardz, known in Japan as Jaja-uma Quartet (Jaja馬!カルテット), is a Japanese manga series written by Noritaka Suzuki. It was adapted into a two-episode original video animation (OVA) anime in 1997, directed by Yasuchika Nagaoka. It was released in Japan by Studio OX, Movic and BMG Victor Japan. It has been released in North America by Central Park Media.

== Summary ==
The Card Kingdom is a prominent land that is taken over by invaders and it is up to the Crown Knights to push back the invaders and protect their land with all their might.

This anime has very little fan service compared to the director's previous works and instead of the cute magical girl genre, the focus is more action-oriented with styles similar to a shōnen series. Some of the characters and enemies are named after game pieces and cards to coincide with the theme.

== The Crown Knights ==
=== Joe Diamond XVII (Jo Diamonds, the 17th) ===
Jo possesses supersonic speed and incredible flight. Her Diamond Magic makes her almost invincible and can even surpass light speed.

=== Casa Clover XVII (Casa Clubs, the 17th) ===
Casa is the mystic of the Crown Knights and can sense anything with her psychic powers.

=== Coco Heartful XVIII (Coco Hearts, the 18th) ===
Coco is the jokester of the Crown Knight and is a psionic who uses "Psycho Magic". She's also the youngest of the Crown Knights.

=== Sunday Spade XVII (Sunday Spades, the 17th) ===
Sunday is the poker-faced leader of the Crown Knights who has a fearsome power hidden underneath and will only use it to save the Card Kingdom. She mostly stays behind and orders the other Crown Knights to defend the kingdom and only chooses to go into battle when necessary.
