= Space Channel 5 =

1999 video game

- European Dreamcast box art
- Developer: Sega AM9 (Note: Game Boy Advance port developed by Art Co., Ltd)
- Publishers: Sega; PlayStation 2: EU: Sony Computer Entertainment; NA: Agetec; Game Boy Advance; THQ
- Director: Takashi Yuda
- Producer: Tetsuya Mizuguchi
- Designer: Takumi Yoshinaga
- Programmer: Hitoshi Nakanishi
- Artist: Yumiko Miyabe
- Writer: Takumi Yoshinaga
- Composers: Naofumi Hataya; Kenichi Tokoi
- Series: Space Channel 5
- Platforms: Dreamcast, PlayStation 2, Game Boy Advance
- Release: December 16, 1999: Dreamcast; JP: December 16, 1999; NA: June 6, 2000; EU: October 6, 2000 PlayStation 2; EU: March 15, 2002; JP: December 12, 2002; NA: November 18, 2003 Game Boy Advance; NA: June 3, 2003; EU: September 12, 2003
- Genre: Music
- Mode: Single-player

Space Channel 5 (Note: Supēsu Channeru Faibu (Japanese: スペースチャンネル5)) is a 1999 music video game developed and published by Sega for the Dreamcast. It was later ported to the PlayStation 2 and Game Boy Advance. Following space-faring reporter Ulala as she investigates an alien invasion, players engage in rhythm-based combat where Ulala mimics the actions of rivals in time to musical tracks.

The game was conceived by Tetsuya Mizuguchi, who was told to create something aimed at a female audience. Production lasted two years, with a staff of around 20 that included company veterans and newcomers to game development. The music, composed by Naofumi Hataya and Kenichi Tokoi, drew inspiration from big band music, including Ken Woodman's song "Mexican Flyer", which served as the game's theme song. The visual style was influenced by culture from the 1950s and 1960s and the later music videos of Peter Gabriel and Michael Jackson, the latter having a cameo appearance in the game.

While the game was released to low sales, it received generally positive reviews; praise focused on its music-based gameplay and art direction, but it was also faulted for its short length and syncing issues with the graphics. The PlayStation 2 version met with similar praise, with many recommending it due to the low selling price. The Game Boy Advance version, subtitled Ulala's Cosmic Attack, saw lower scores due to technical shortcomings. The game has since spawned a series of related games and media, beginning with the sequel Space Channel 5: Part 2, released in 2002 in Japan and 2003 worldwide.

== Premise and gameplay ==
Ulala battles rival reporter Pudding during a boss encounter.

Space Channel 5 is a music video game in which players take on the role of Ulala, a reporter working for the titular news channel in a 1960s-styled science fiction future filled with competing news channels. When an alien race called the Morolians begin attacking, Ulala simultaneously reports on the events, fights off the threat, and clashes with rival reporters. The invasion is revealed to have been staged by Space Channel 5 boss Chief Blank to drive up ratings for the channel. With help from fellow reporters and support from her fans, Ulala defeats Blank.

Players control Ulala through four stages; real-time polygonal character models and visual effects move in sync to pre-rendered MPEG movies which form the level backgrounds. Gameplay primarily has Ulala mimicking the movements and vocalisations of her opponents (compared by journalists to the game Simon Says). Actions are performed in time to music tracks playing in each section of a stage. There are six buttons that match actions on-screen; the directional pad buttons, and two action buttons (A and B on Dreamcast and Game Boy Advance (GBA), Cross and Circle on PlayStation 2) which are presented with the vocalization "chu".

Levels are split between "dance" areas and shooting areas. During dance sections, Ulala mimics actions and shouts of "chu" from enemies, with successful actions boosting a "Ratings" meter in the lower right corner of the screen. In combat, Ulala must shoot at and defeat enemies, and also rescue hostages with the other action button. After either a dance or combat section, Ulala is joined in her progress by the people she rescued. During boss battles, Ulala has a health meter represented on-screen as hearts; a heart is lost for each mistake. If Ulala makes too many mistakes and loses all hearts during boss battles, fails to meet the minimum rating requirements, or causes ratings to drop to zero by missing or failing actions, the player reaches a game over and must restart. The game features a new game plus option, where players can begin a new game using a completed save file. Depending on the current rating, alternate routes are unlocked and new enemy patterns appear.

== Development ==
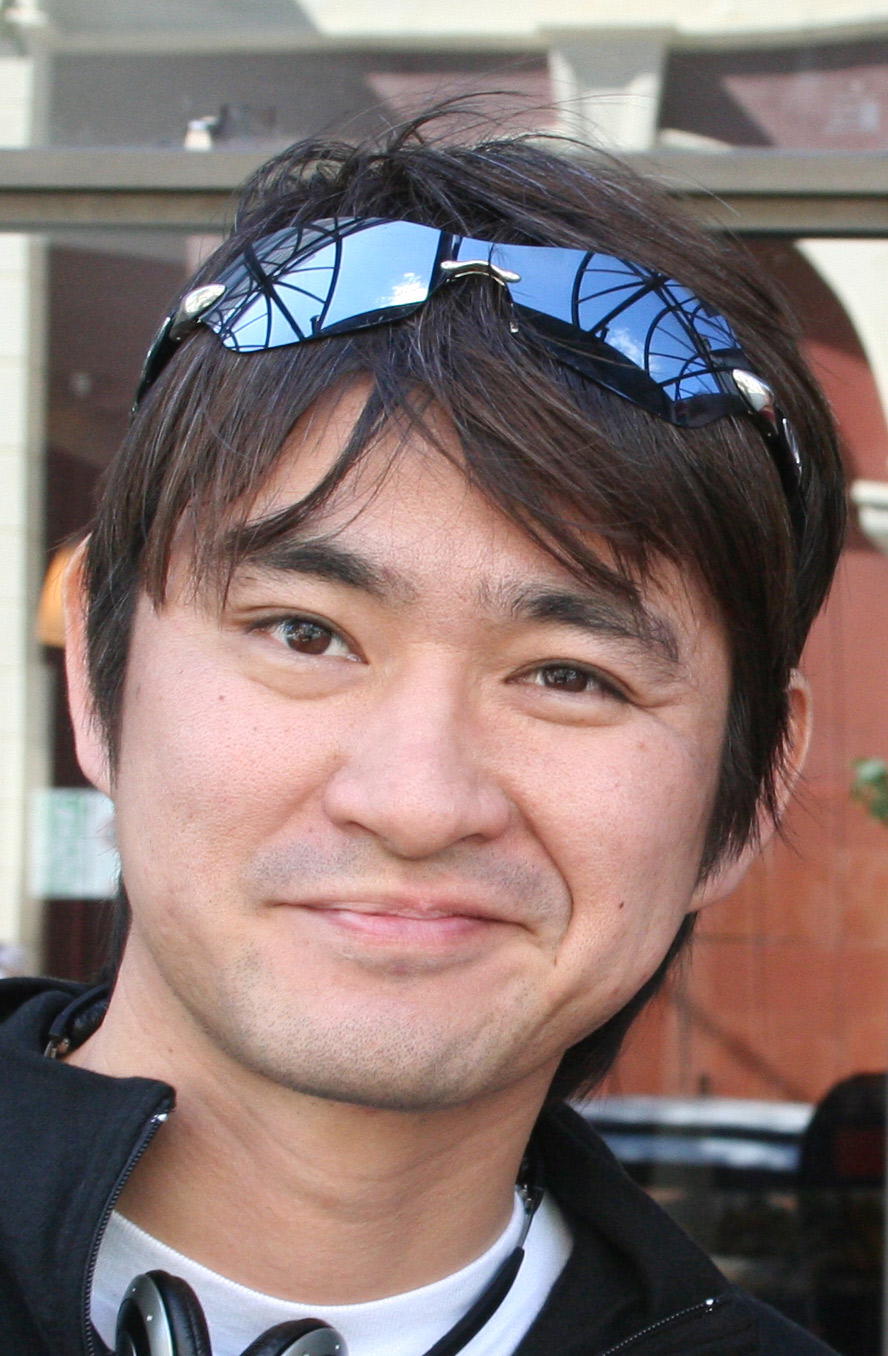
Tetsuya Mizuguchi, founder of AM Annex, which later became United Game Artists

The concept for Space Channel 5 originated when Tetsuya Mizuguchi—then known for his work on racing games—was contacted by Sega to develop a game for the Dreamcast aimed at a female casual gaming demographic. Mizuguchi had no knowledge of such a demographic, so he personally interviewed several young girls to find their tastes in gaming. He discovered that, while male gamers trended towards games that allowed for ranking and high scores, women preferred straight puzzle games. Mizuguchi decided to create a game which would bring together both video game and music fans, using his personal experience with nightclub disco and music events such as Street Parade. He also drew inspiration from the art of Wassily Kandinsky, wanting to encourage a form of synesthesia within players. Other sources of inspiration were the music of the 1950s and 60s, and the music videos of Peter Gabriel and Michael Jackson that were showing on MTV during the 80s. This concept originated in 1993, with full production beginning in 1998 following extensive internal planning and approval by Sega senior staff.

Production was handled by Sega AM9, later known as United Game Artists. The team included many staff from Team Andromeda (makers of Panzer Dragoon) and the Sonic the Hedgehog series, and others who were complete newcomers to game development. Development for the game lasted almost two years. Beginning with a small team of ten, it eventually expanded to 27 members as development progressed. Mizuguchi acted as the game's producer, with Takashi Yuda both directing and providing the voice for supporting character Fuze. The game was Mizuguchi's first time working on a game aimed exclusively at the home console market, as his earlier work had first been developed for arcades. Speaking about the Dreamcast, Mizuguchi said that it allowed higher-quality music compared to graphics-focused racing games. He wanted to use the new technology to incorporate interactivity into the score. Production was challenging at times due to the balance of gameplay and scenario.

=== Design ===
The earliest versions of the game were described by Mizuguchi as "very cool, but not so fun", as players simply pressed buttons in time to the music while a non-interactive video changed. To make the game more interesting, Mizuguchi drew inspiration from the rhythm troope Stomp; a particular piece which inspired him was a segment where a performer would have the audience copy their clapping, with the rhythm becoming more complex over time. Mizuguchi wanted to incorporate this into the game, combining it with a narrative and distinctive music. The rest of the team found it difficult to understand Mizuguchi's vision as they were confused by his wish for comedy to be a part of the game's style, so he hired a pantomime artist to school the team in physical comedy. The production team also went to a comedy workshop to practise miming and physical comedy routines to further inform their understanding of the game. The name of the game's aliens "Morolians" was a derivation of the surname of artist Mayumi Moro; it came about as the team often used her last name around the office. Moro found its use in the game funny.

A key aspect of the game was that while the gameplay involved shooting, Ulala never actually killed anyone, allowing the game to be approachable to a wider range of players. When pitching the gameplay in his design document, Mizuguchi distilled the basic cycle of effort and reward, then came up with a means of realising them in the game. To ensure the team fully understood the gameplay concept of matching button presses to music and character actions, all extraneous effects were stripped away, leaving a basic version the team could focus on. While some animations were created using motion capture, the rest were animated by hand. The vocalization "Chu" emerged during voice recording. The original word was "Shoot", but the actors had difficulty pronouncing it using the necessary single syllable, resulting in the word being contracted and altered into its current form.

Ulala's motion capture actions were performed by Japanese dancer Nazu Nahoko. The Morolians' movements were scripted by the mime artist Mizuguchi hired to help the team during early production. The idea of streaming polygonal models over CGI movies was suggested by Yuta. They made use of ADX technology to synch the movement of models over the movies. The game content filled just over 99% of the Dreamcast GD-ROM disc. The space usage was attributed by Mizuguchi to the large amount of video and audio streaming used in the game. In hindsight, Mizuguchi cited the use of pre-rendered movies as a challenge to the team. Due to the amount of space used, some planned comedy segments had to be cut. An early tech demo was put together for the game; in this prototype version, the player character was a man, and only the most basic elements of its gameplay and theme were in place. A later version featured a prototype design for Ulala. The game's visual aesthetic of a "retro future" was present in that demo, and stayed throughout production. Influences on the characters and art design came from across the production team, with tastes ranging from Star Wars to Doraemon to Monty Python. Mizuguchi was inspired by the contrasting styles of orchestral music and science fiction setting used in Star Wars.

The character of Ulala was a collaborative creation, though much of her design was attributed to the game's art director Yumiko Miyabe. Ulala's early actions were deemed too "cool and stylish", and her overall movement too stiff. Her design was also adjusted several times so she would appeal to male gamers (who favored looks) and female gamers (who preferred personality). Another notable artist on the project was Jake Kazdal, who worked as a concept and model artist. Kazdal said that one of Ulala's key design inspirations was the titular lead of the science fiction film Barbarella (1968). The art style continued to evolve from there, with the staff often laughing at the "sheer ridiculousness" of some later characters. Her costume's orange colour was a reference to the Dreamcast logo and signified Sega's new direction.

=== Audio ===
==== Music ====
The music for Space Channel 5 was composed by Naofumi Hataya and Kenichi Tokoi of Sega's music label WaveMaster. Hataya also acted as sound director. The musical style, inspired by big band jazz of the 1950s and 60s, was one of the earliest elements to be decided upon. Hataya attributed the game's musical direction to Mizuguchi's guidance throughout production. The musical style changed with each stage, with later sections incorporating techno and trance. The in-game soundtrack mixed CD-quality music with midi sound samples. According to Hataya, one of the hardest aspects of music development was the variety of genres and fitting all the score onto the game disc. Music production ran simultaneously with the game's production, with the sound team at first using concept art and in-production gameplay. Late in development, the story caused a lot of additional work for the team. The final total of in-game music was estimated at 70 minutes.

The game's main theme was "Mexican Flyer", composed by Ken Woodman in 1966. Mizuguchi approached Woodman about using the theme. Woodman was surprised that someone wanted to use the theme for a video game. The use of "Mexican Flyer" in the game's early presentation video informed the direction of the music. Getting the rights to the track proved difficult, as the track was extremely obscure and had not been used in any media since its release. The ending theme "Pala Paya" used vocals performed by WaveMaster staff. A soundtrack album for the game was published by Marvelous Entertainment and distributed by VAP on February 21, 2000. The album featured 22 tracks, including a remix of "Mexican Flyer". Tracks from Space Channel 5 were included in the compilation album Space Channel 5 20th Anniversary: Gyungyun Selection by UMA on December 18, 2019.

==== Voice cast ====
Sega chose not to promote the game's voice cast. Most of the voice roles were performed by members of the game's staff. This was due to the team wanting full control of how characters were portrayed, and the need to do quick re-recording sessions. Ulala's Japanese voice actress was similarly pulled from Sega staff. According to Mizuguchi, the recording process was so strenuous, and his demands so exacting that the actress was brought to tears. Journalist James Mielke attributed Ulala's voice to Mineko Okamura. Okamura later confirmed her role, saying her demo voice was kept in the final game after positive feedback from the press. Professionals Show Hayami and Kae Iida were hired for the roles of rival reporters Jaguar and Pudding respectively, with Iida originally being planned for the role of Ulala. Ulala was voiced in English by Apollo Smile, then a notable television personality.

A notable cameo was Michael Jackson himself, featuring in the game as the character "Space Michael". A long-term collaborator with and fan of Sega, Jackson was shown a near-finished version of the game by Sega staff member Shuji Utsumi. Jackson loved the game and wanted to be featured in it. Mizuguchi initially wanted to refuse the request, as the game was only a month away from completion, but the team wanted to include Jackson, so they substituted a Morolian-controlled NPC character for a model based on Jackson and added moves based on the singer's famous dance moves. Initially thinking Jackson would dislike it, Mizuguchi was surprised when Jackson approved, realising the pressures the team were under, and provided voice lines for the character.

== Release ==
Space Channel 5 was first announced at the September 1999 Tokyo Game Show. Nahoko portrayed the character Ulala at live promotional events, including its TGS showings. The game was released in Japan on December 16, 1999. Sega pushed the game's release with heavy public promotions and an extensive launch event in Tokyo. The game was supported by several pieces of merchandise. In the US, Sega conducted a contest in Universal City, California titled Space Channel 5 Ulala-a-like Contest. The contestants were girls between the ages of 9 and 21 who competed to who could resemble Ulala the best. The contestants were able to meet with Ulala portrayed by Kelly Preston and the winner won $500 and a Dreamcast.

The game's localization was handled by Sega, who approached it "with care and time". One of the key elements for the team was finding the right English voice for Ulala. When the dialogue was localized, there was little difference between regions beyond language-specific nuances. The music itself received little to no changes. The game was released internationally in 2000; it was published in North America on June 6, and in Europe on October 8.

Following their exit from the console market, Sega began moving the Space Channel 5 franchise onto other systems, beginning with the PlayStation 2. The PS2 version released in Europe on March 15, 2002; and in Japan on December 12 of that year. In North America, the PS2 port was bundled with its sequel and published in the region by Agetec. This version released in North America on November 18. In Japan, the PS2 version has since become a rarity, fetching high resale prices.

A remake for the Game Boy Advance titled Space Channel 5: Ulala's Cosmic Attack was also produced. This formed part of Sega's partnership with THQ to co-develop and co-publish several of their franchises to the platform. The port was co-developed by Art Co., Ltd and THQ. The game was re-created within the GBA hardware, with its music rendered using a MIDI score. The music was handled by Tsutomu Fuzawa. The game was released as a Western exclusive in 2003; it was published on June 17 in North America and September 12 in Europe.

== Reception ==
Reception

Aggregate scores
Aggregator	Score		
Aggregator	Dreamcast	GBA	PS2
GameRankings	84%	59%	79%
Metacritic	N/A	55/100	79/100

Review scores
Publication	Score		
Publication	Dreamcast	GBA	PS2
Computer and Video Games	5/5	N/A	N/A
Electronic Gaming Monthly	7.67/10	N/A	7.83/10
Famitsu	29/40	N/A	N/A
Game Informer	7.75/10	7/10	8.25/10
GamePro	4/5	3.5/5	4.5/5
GameSpot	7/10	4.5/10	6.9/10
GameSpy	8.5/10	1/5	4.5/5
GameZone	N/A	6.9/10	8.9/10
IGN	9.2/10	5/10	7.4/10
Next Generation	4/5	N/A	N/A
Nintendo Power	N/A	3/5	N/A
PlayStation Official Magazine – UK	N/A	N/A	7/10
Official U.S. PlayStation Magazine	N/A	N/A	3.5/5
Entertainment Weekly	A−	N/A	N/A
USA Today	4/4	N/A	N/A
The Village Voice	N/A	8/10	N/A

=== Dreamcast ===
Upon its debut in Japan, the game met with low sales. During its first week, it sold through just over 44% of its stock with over 41,000 units. It eventually sold over 93,600 units in Japan, being among the region's top 40 best-selling Dreamcast titles. At a 2002 conference, the game was declared a success by its staff, finding a wide audience among both hardcore and casual gamers. In contrast during a 2005 interview, Mizuguchi said that the game was not a commercial success.

According to video game review aggregator GameRankings, the Dreamcast version earned a score of 84% based on 34 reviews. Japanese gaming magazine Famitsu gave the game a score of 29 points out of 40. Pat Garratt of Computer and Video Games gave the game a perfect score, calling it a unique game and "absolute must for every DC owner". The three reviewers for Electronic Gaming Monthly lauded the soundtrack and art design, but noted issues with its short length and occasional syncing issues. GamePro positively compared the gameplay and style to PaRappa the Rapper and Dragon's Lair, recommending it as a short and enjoyable experience while noting a lack of extras. GameSpot's Jeff Gerstmann said Space Channel 5 was worth playing for its unconventional art style and music, with his main complaints being repetitive gameplay and lack of unlockables.

GameSpy called the game "a work of art in every sense of the word", praising the world and music and calling the game a testament to Sega's production skills; their one major problem was the simplistic gameplay style and lack of features beyond the campaign. IGN gave both the Japanese original and the Western release near-perfect scores, praising the presentation while criticizing the short length and timing issues. USA Today said the game was "all about fun, and [Space Channel 5] delivers with a song." Entertainment Weekly said that "gamers of all ages undoubtedly will want to help Ulala get her groove back — if not get their hands on a pair of those boots." Next Generation's Greg Orlando called the game "Beautiful and all-too-short".

Space Channel 5 was nominated for awards in four categories at the 1999 Japan Game Awards. It was also nominated in the "Animation" and "Console Innovation" categories at the Academy of Interactive Arts & Sciences' awards ceremony in 2001. Space Channel 5 and Sega AM9 were nominated at the 2002 BAFTA Awards in the "Best Audio" category, losing to Luigi's Mansion.

In anniversary retrospectives and lists of favorite Dreamcast titles from multiple websites including Gamasutra and IGN, Space Channel 5 has been remembered as one of the most unique titles on the system for its gameplay design and art direction. 1UP.com, in an article about Mizuguchi's work with United Game Artists, "highlight" on the Dreamcast and described as "unlike anything before it."

=== PlayStation 2 ===
The PlayStation 2 port was met with a similarly positive response. GameRankings gave the North American release a score of 79% based on 7 reviews; and Metacritic gave it a score of 79 out of a possible 100 from 16 reviews, indicating a "generally favorable" reception. Electronic Gaming Monthly said that the mixture of music and unique style gave the game "an infectious, addictive quality". GamePro called the Special Edition package "easily the best bargain for the PS2 this side of [Virtua Fighter 4: Evolution]". Game Informer called the release "a great package crammed with more value and personality than most rhythm games". Brad Shoemaker of GameSpot felt it was a great release due to its low price and having both the original and its sequel.

GameSpy's Christian Nutt lauded the music and its lead character, in addition to the low price for the double game pack, but faulted its length and issues with the localization. GameZone recommended the package for fans of Dance Dance Revolution, and said gamers outside its target audience should try it due to its quality and enjoyability. Douglass Perry of IGN, comparing the game to its sequel that formed part of the package, felt that the first was the inferior game due to lacking the later additions and polishing. Paul Fitzpatrick of Official U.S. PlayStation Magazine felt that the original game's flaws were only exacerbated when contrasted with its sequel. Paul Fitzpatrick of PlayStation Official Magazine – UK enjoyed the soundtrack and lauded its sense of style, but criticized its length.

=== Game Boy Advance ===
By contrast, the Game Boy Advance port received a Metacritic score of 55 out of 100 based on 15 reviews, indicating "mixed or average" reception. GamePro was surprised that the game worked on the portable console, praising the efforts of the team while being unable to recommend it to buyers. For Frank Provo of GameSpot, the biggest problem was the unresponsive controls, as otherwise, the game was a laudable conversion of the game for the GBA. GameSpy's Steve Steinberg was very critical, calling the game "a barely playable disappointment" despite liking the soundtrack. GameZone said that the difficulties with controlling Ulala and presentation made the game suitable only for hardcore series fans. Craig Harris, writing for IGN, said that while the gameplay was intact, the other elements were undermined by the technical constraints of the console. The Village Voice gave the port a good score, saying that the game's core remained intact and enjoyable despite low graphical quality and control issues. Game Informer was also positive, saying that there could be no better version of Space Channel 5 on the platform. Nintendo Power gave praise to the control responses, but called the graphics "colorful but sparse".

== Legacy ==
=== Sequels ===
A sequel to Space Channel 5 was planned from an early stage, but production was put on hold until Western sales figures came in. The sequel, Space Channel 5: Part 2, was announced in October 2001. It received a simultaneous release on Dreamcast and PS2 in February 2002 in Japan. The PS2 version was released in mainland Europe the following year. In North America, the game was released as part of Space Channel 5: Special Edition by Agetec. It was the last game produced by United Game Artists prior to Sega's internal restructuring in 2003. Part 2 was later given a high-definition port to Microsoft Windows, Xbox 360, and PlayStation 3. It was released first as part of the Dreamcast Collection in February 2011, then as a standalone digital release in October of the same year.

While concepts existed for a third game in the series and pitches were made for the Wii and Kinect, the team felt they had exhausted their ideas, and Sega showed little interest in a new entry. At one time, Mizuguchi and Q Entertainment were in discussions with Sega about reviving the series for HD consoles. A new virtual reality project was eventually greenlit by Sega. The project was developed by Grounding Inc., a game company founded by former Sega developers including Okamura, who pitched the concept to Sega. Beginning in 2016 as an experimental collaboration with Sega and KDDI titled Space Channel 5 VR: Ukiuki Viewing Show, the project saw a strong fan response for a full game. Titled Space Channel 5 VR: Kinda Funky News Flash, the player takes the role of novice reporters assisting Ulala during a new invasion report. Originally scheduled for release on PlayStation VR, SteamVR, HTC Vive and Oculus Quest during December 2019, the game was delayed into the following year to improve its quality. All versions were released between February and November 2020.

=== Additional media and cameos ===
Ulala was falsely reported as being used in a collaboration between MTV and Sega to present the "Best Video" award at the MTV Video Music Award ceremony in 2000. Ulala's appearance at the event was also used to promote SegaNet during its Dreamcast debut. This stems from a misunderstanding of a quote form Peter Moore: "...we did a massive promo with them (MTV) where Ulala actually introduced the best dance video at the Video Music Awards..." A CGI television adaptation of Space Channel 5 was originally planned from SuperMega Media. In addition, Ulala was to have featured on the MTV program slot as an announcer. These MTV collaborations were cancelled mid-production. A film adaptation of the series was announced in August 2022. A collaboration between Sega and Erik Feig's Picturestart company, the script is being co-written by Barry Battles and Nir Paniry.

Sega's Sonic Team studio also created a mobile application called Ulala's Channel J (Note: (うららのチャンネルJ)) for Japanese Vodafone devices in July 2001. The application consisted of several minigames, most themed after the series and specifically Space Channel 5: Part 2. Some featured 3D graphics that required higher-specification devices to play. Themed mobile wallpapers and jingles were also included for download. The game shut down in September 2005, with some of its content merged into the Sonic Cafe mobile service.

In 2001, Palisades Toys produced themed merchandise; these included a lunch box, and figures of game characters including boss characters Evila, Pudding, the Morolians, and several variants of Ulala. Japanese action figure company Max Factory produced two Ulala figures based on her main looks from Space Channel 5 and its sequel in 2017. United Game Artists' next game Rez featured the Morolian character as a secret playable character. Ulala was featured as a secret character in racing game Sonic Riders, a playable character in multiple entries in the Sega All-Stars series (alongside Pudding and Blib), part of a themed stage in the Wii re-release of the rhythm game Samba de Amigo, and a playable unit in the crossover strategy game Project X Zone and its sequel.

=== Lawsuit ===
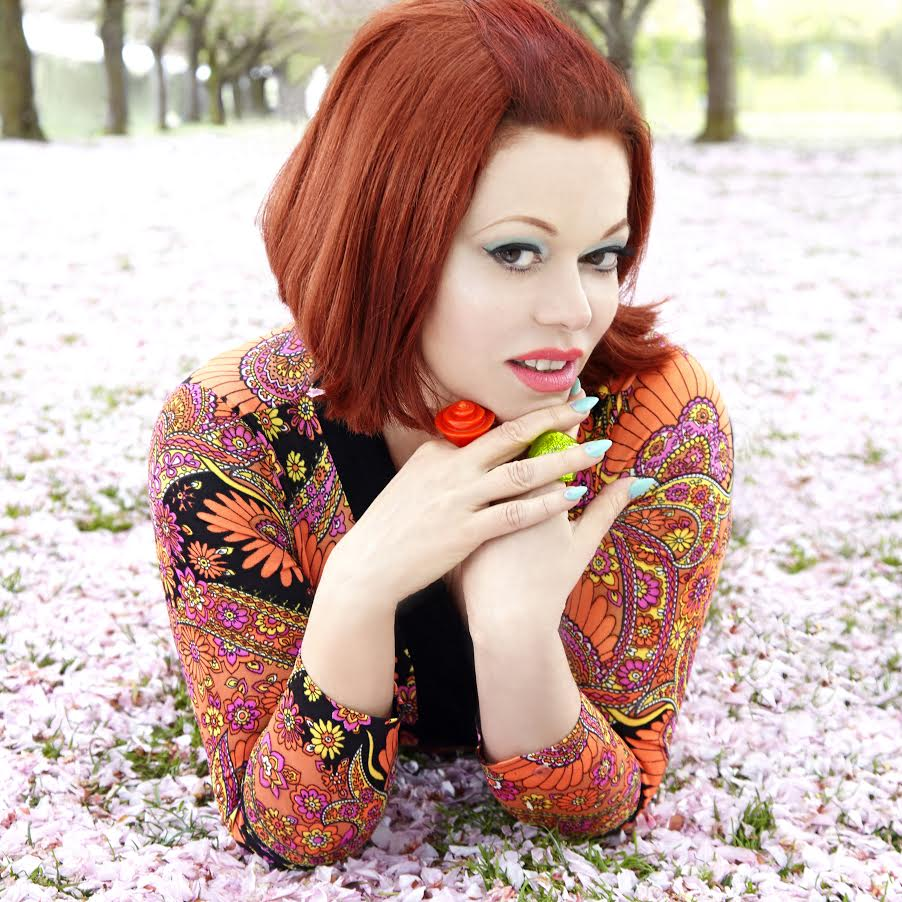
Kierin Magenta Kirby on the left, and Ulala on the right

In 2003, Space Channel 5 and its protagonist Ulala were the subject of a lawsuit against Sega from Deee-Lite vocalist Kierin Magenta Kirby. In July 2000, a Sega affiliate contacted Kirby to determine if she was interested in promoting the game in England, utilizing the 1990 Deee-Lite song "Groove Is in the Heart"; Kirby rejected the offer. Kirby alleged that the "Ulala" character was an unauthorized misappropriation of her likeness. During the lawsuit, Sega showed that the game and character had been created and released in Japan between 1997 and 1999. The judge ruled that regardless of when the "Ulala" character was created, the character did not have a close enough resemblance to Kirby to deem misappropriation of likeness. Kirby was obliged to pay Sega's legal fees of $608,000 (reduced from $763,000 on request). "Groove Is in the Heart" was later licensed for use in Sega's 2008 Wii port of Samba de Amigo, used in a section of the game where the Ulala character appears.
