= Samba de Amigo =

1999 video game

- North American Dreamcast box art
- Developer: Sonic Team (Note: Wii version developed by Gearbox Software and Escalation Studios.)
- Publisher: Sega
- Director: Shun Nakamura
- Producer: Yuji Naka
- Designers: Shun Nakamura; Tomohiko Aita
- Programmer: Takahiro Hamano
- Artist: Yuji Uekawa
- Composer: Masaru Setsumaru
- Platforms: Arcade, Dreamcast, Wii
- Release: December 1999: Arcade; JP: December 1999; NA: 2000 Ver. 2000; JP: December 14, 2000 Dreamcast; JP: April 27, 2000; NA: October 17, 2000; EU: December 8, 2000 Wii; NA: September 23, 2008; EU: September 26, 2008; AU: October 2, 2008; JP: December 11, 2008
- Genre: Rhythm
- Modes: Single-player, multiplayer
- Arcade system: Sega NAOMI

Samba de Amigo (Note: Japanese: サンバDEアミーゴ, Hepburn: Sanba de Amīgo) is a 1999 rhythm game developed by Sonic Team and published by Sega for arcades. It later saw a port to the Dreamcast in 2000 and the Wii in 2008. Based primarily on Latin American culture, the game sees players shaking maraca controllers to the beat of a song in order to score points.

A sequel, Samba de Amigo: Party Central, which is focused more on pop music in general, was released in 2023 for Nintendo Switch, the Apple Arcade mobile game subscription service, and Meta Quest virtual reality headsets.

== Gameplay ==
Gameplay of the primary game mode on the Dreamcast version

Samba de Amigo is a rhythm game that is played with a pair of maraca controllers. As a song plays, the player, guided by on-screen graphics, must shake the maracas at high, middle, or low heights with the beat of the music, or occasionally must strike poses with the maracas held in various positions. The player is represented on-screen by Amigo, a monkey. If the player does well, the scene around Amigo (usually a concert or a dance) will attract more people and become more vividly animated; if the player does poorly, characters leave and eventually all that's left is Amigo alone, looking sad.

In the primary game mode, each player has six spots arranged in a circle on the screen: two red meaning "shake high," two yellow meaning "shake middle," and two green meaning "shake low." Blue dots will appear in the center of this circle and move towards the spots; as soon as the blue dot touches a spot, the player must shake a maraca at that location. For example, if a blue dot touches the upper left spot, the player must shake either maraca above their left shoulder. If both maracas are shaken in that location, the player gets an "Amigo" bonus. Occasionally a long line of dots will flow into a spot and the word "Shake" appears, telling the player to continue shaking his maraca rapidly there. Sometimes, a stick-figure (named "Pose") appears on the screen holding its maracas in a certain position; the player has a second or two to match the figure's pose for points.

=== Game modes ===
In the original arcade game, the player is given two or three stages to play through, depending on how the options are set. Each stage has three songs to choose from. If the player does well enough on each stage, an additional Special stage is enabled, where three of the more challenging songs are made available.

In the Dreamcast port, this version of the game is playable as Arcade mode. Original mode is the same game, except that instead of being limited to three songs in each stage, the player gets to choose from any song in the game that has been unlocked. Initially, six songs are available in this mode, while more can be unlocked by playing the Arcade or Challenge modes.

The home game also adds a Party mode, with minigames such as Guacamole (pronounced and played much the same as "Whac-A-Mole"), Strike A Pose (consisting of a long sequence of poses to make), and 1-2-Samba! (where spots must be hit in sequence - the Japanese version's name for this minigame, "Ichi Ni San-ba," is a pun on counting to three in Japanese). Also included in Party mode is the Battle game, where two players compete to score high combos and knock out their opponent, and the Couples game (known as "Love Love" in Japan), where two players play through a song to test their "compatibility". Along with this, the home version has features which can be unlocked, such as alternate sound effects and downloadable songs.

Finally, a Challenge mode has been added, where the player is given specific goals in order to proceed through stages. These goals include having to reach a certain letter grade or to pass a certain score while playing a song. There are 25 challenges total, separated into five stages.

=== Maraca controllers ===
The original arcade game used red maraca controllers modeled after their in-game design. Magnetic sensors were used to determine their position. As this was an expensive process, it had to be reworked for the home version.

In the Dreamcast version, each maraca has a cord which is plugged into a bar that lies in front of the player's feet. The bar is slightly more than two feet in length and has a sensor at each end, and each maraca has an ultrasonic transmitter mounted on its cord; this allows the system to triangulate the position of each maraca. The rattle part can be unscrewed from the top of each maraca for quieter play. Included in the box is a plastic mat with two brown footprints, which helps players properly position themselves in relation to the sensor bar.

In a Flash version mini-game used for the promotion of the Wii version of the game, keys W, D and C, then O, J and N is used to tap the drums. The mini game also played an introductory movie showing a family playing the Wii version of the game.

== Development ==
Samba de Amigo was first developed as an experimental arcade game during the time of attractive music arcade games and swiftly by a team with little experience in game development. Shun Nakamura, the game's director, was more focused on creating a music game where players could have fun and enjoy the performance of music, instead of just playing music. The choice of maracas was inspired by how Japanese people would use maracas to add interest to karaoke performances. As the game was originally developed for the local Japanese market, Western songs that were familiar to Japanese audiences were chosen, as well as songs with rhythms that were easy for one to immerse into. The main character, Amigo, was determined based on how his cheerful personality matched the typical portrayal of monkeys, and finalized by Yuji Uekawa, the character designer for the Sonic the Hedgehog series. The game received positive reception every time it was presented by the team, which would lead it to being ported to the Dreamcast.

== Other releases ==
=== Ver. 2000 ===
Samba de Amigo: Ver. 2000, was released in Japan for the arcades and the Dreamcast. It is an upgraded version, and it contains 14 new songs, as well as six new downloadable songs for the home version. Whereas in the original game, there were only three songs to choose in each stage, this version allows the player to choose several. "Love Love/Couples" Mode, originally available only in the home version of Samba de Amigo, is included in the arcade version of Ver. 2000. A new character named Amiga joins the cast. She is Amigo's sister, and wields a tambourine. In the home version, a new volleyball game replaces the original minigames. Survival mode was also added, where the player must finish as many songs in a row as they can. In addition, the Challenge mode has new goals, as well as five new secret stages that are quite difficult.

The most significant addition to Ver. 2000 is the new "Hustle Mode". In this mode, the player must still follow the dots and shake the maracas in the appropriate location, but this is done a lot less often. Instead, Pose appears frequently, and in addition to making the player do static poses, he will be shaking his maracas in certain patterns that the player must mimic. These patterns include either shaking one or both maracas back and forth between two of the six positions, doing a full 360° rotation starting from one position, and looping all the way back around. All the songs in the game, including the ones previously found in the first version, have both Original and Hustle Mode patterns.

Samba de Amigo Ver. 2000 was announced for North American release, under the name Samba de Amigo Ver. 2001, but it was among the games that were canceled when Sega discontinued support for their console.

=== Wii version ===
In mid-2007, veteran developers Gearbox Software came up with the idea to port the game to the Wii console, and upon Sega's approval, began working on the new version with Sonic Team as consultants. The default setting of the game uses the Wii Remote and Nunchuk to simulate the maraca-shaking from the original game, with the option to use two remotes for completely wireless play. Optional maraca-shaped attachments are also available to provide the full experience. Unlike the maraca controls of the Dreamcast version, which could detect the height at which they were shaken, the Wii sensor bar is not capable of this. Instead, the angle at which the Wii Remote is being shaken determines if high, mid or low notes are hit. The rotation of the controller also has an effect on note detection, especially when doing cross-over moves.

All the characters and stage designs from the original game return with enhanced graphics. Many of the additions from Ver. 2000 that were not available to people outside Japan are included, such as Hustle Mode and the new character Amiga. A "Career" mode exclusive to the Wii version is included, consisting of challenges in which players must clear songs to earn various unlockables, including maraca effects and additional songs. Unique to the Wii version, new stages based on other Sega games were added, including ones based on Sonic the Hedgehog and Space Channel 5, complete with cameos of Sonic and Ulala respectively. Nearly, but not all the songs from the original game are included. It also includes many of the songs from Ver. 2000. 23 Wii-exclusive songs were added, bringing the total to 44. The game supports Miis and displays them next to the player's score, as well as showing two random ones in-game during stages, with their expressions changing based on performance (Bad, Medium or Good). Online leaderboards and friends lists let players post their best scores and compare them, but only when an original, player-created Mii is used. This feature cannot be used with the guest Miis.

In addition, downloadable songs were available for an extra charge. These additional songs came in download packs. The first pack included the songs "I Want Candy (cover version)" by Bow Wow Wow, "Are You Gonna Be My Girl" by Jet and "Mambo Mambo" by Lou Bega (all master tracks), and were available upon the game's release. Download packs came in sets of three and cost 500 Wii points. A total of three download packs were released by December 2008.

Samba de Amigo was the first retail Wii title to support the "pay and play" portion of the Nintendo Wi-Fi Connection, previously used exclusively by WiiWare titles.

== Reception ==
Reception

Aggregate score
Aggregator	Score
Metacritic	89/100

Review scores
Publication	Score
Famitsu	32/40
Next Generation	5/5

In Japan, Game Machine listed Samba de Amigo on their February 1, 2000, issue as being the most-successful dedicated arcade game of the month. It went on to be the highest-grossing dedicated arcade game of 2000 in Japan.

Blake Fischer reviewed the Dreamcast version of the game for Next Generation, rating it five stars out of five, and stated: "It's different, it's wacky, and it's insanely fun. Just shake your Maraca's and watch the monkey dance - that's all you need."

The Dreamcast version of Samba de Amigo was met with nearly universal positive reviews, garnering an 89% average at Metacritic. Famitsu scored the Dreamcast version of the game a 32 out of 40. Critics praised it for its unique and addictive gameplay, while the most common criticism was how the game could not be enjoyed without the expensive Maraca controllers.

In addition, Samba de Amigo won the following awards:

- E3 2000 Game Critics Awards: Best Puzzle/Trivia/Parlor Game
- 1st Annual Game Developers Choice Awards: nominated for the Excellence in Audio award and for a Game Spotlight Award.

GameSpot presented Samba de Amigo with its annual "Best Puzzle Game" and "Best Game No One Played" awards among console games, and nominated it in the "Best Game Music" and "Best Graphics, Artistic" categories.

During the 4th Annual Interactive Achievement Awards, the Academy of Interactive Arts & Sciences nominated Samba de Amigo for the "Console Innovation" award.

In a 2016 retrospective, German magazine MANIAC ranked Samba de Amigo 16th among its 25 best Dreamcast games. The publication noted that the high price was a significant barrier for many players, with the game and Sega's official maraca controllers costing around 250 Deutsche Mark (approximately €130).

=== Ver. 2000 ===
Ver. 2000 Reception

Review scores
Publication	Score
AllGame	5/5
Next Generation	4/5

Blake Fischer reviewed the Dreamcast version of Samba de Amigo 2000 for Next Generation, rating it four stars out of five, and stated: "The impact of the first game may have worn off, but it's still a blast to break out the maraca controllers and jam to Sonic Team's latest foray. Samba!."

On release, Famitsu scored the Dreamcast version of the Ver.2000 follow-up a 30 out of 40.

=== Wii version ===
Reception

Aggregate score
Aggregator	Score
Metacritic	68/100

Review scores
Publication	Score
Eurogamer	6/10
GamePro	4/5
GameSpot	6/10
IGN	7.5/10
Nintendo Power	9/10

The game has received mixed reviews overall, ranging from mediocre to positive reception. Eurogamer gave the Wii version 6/10, citing "the imprecise nature of the controls", while admitting that "There's still a decent amount of daft fun to be had out of this joyous little game". GameSpot gave the Wii version 6/10 as well. Other reviews disagreed, with WorthPlaying, saying: "the controls are spot-on 95 percent of the time" and rating the game an 8.5/10. Nintendo Power also gave the game high marks, awarding it a nine out of ten. Gamepro gave the game a four out of five.

== Legacy ==
That same year, Sega released a spiritual successor named Shakatto Tambourine. It was very much the same game as Samba de Amigo, except played with a tambourine controller, and featuring popular J-pop music. Samba de Amigo also made a comeback of sorts in the EyeToy game Sega Superstars, where player movements recorded by the EyeToy camera were recorded in place of the original maracas. A pair of Samba de Amigo themed levels appeared in the 2012 Nintendo 3DS game, Rhythm Thief & the Emperor's Treasure, which are played using buttons and the system's gyroscope.

Samba de Amigo references have continued to appear in many of Sega's other titles. The song "Vamos a Carnival" is featured in the MMO Phantasy Star Online 2 as the game's lobby music every April as part of a yearly Easter event, which would later be re-instated as the BGM of the Easter lobby which appears every second half of April, as well as the Screenshot Studio. A Samba de Amigo-themed level appears in Sonic Pinball Party. Additionally, Amigo appears as a playable character in the crossover racing games Sonic & Sega All-Stars Racing, Sonic & Sega All-Stars Racing Transformed, and Sonic Racing: CrossWorlds.

During the Nintendo Direct aired on February 8, 2023, a sequel named Samba de Amigo: Party Central was announced for the Nintendo Switch, which uses the system's Joy-Con gesture sensors to implement the maracas controls. It is focused more on different popular music genres and was released on August 29, 2023. On June 1, 2023, a virtual reality version based on Party Central was announced during the 2023 Meta Quest Gaming Showcase. It was released on Meta Quest 2, Meta Quest Pro and Meta Quest 3 as Samba de Amigo: Virtual Party. On August 1, 2023, an Apple Arcade version of Party Central, Samba de Amigo: Party-To-Go, was announced to be released on the same date as the Switch version.
