= Dreamcast Collection =

2011 Sega video game compilation

- Cover art for the 2015 Steam release
- Developer: Sega
- Publisher: Sega
- Platforms: Xbox 360, Microsoft Windows
- Release: Xbox 360: NA: February 22, 2011; AU: February 24, 2011; EU: February 25, 2011; Microsoft Windows: NA: February 22, 2011; EU: February 25, 2011; AU: March 3, 2011
- Genre: Various
- Modes: Single-player; Multiplayer (Space Channel 5: Part 2 only)

Dreamcast Collection is a video game compilation developed and published by Sega for the Xbox 360 and Microsoft Windows. When first released in 2011, it included four of the bestselling Dreamcast games: Space Channel 5: Part 2, Sonic Adventure, Sega Bass Fishing, and Crazy Taxi. The Windows version was updated to include Jet Set Radio and NiGHTS into Dreams in 2016, and Sonic Adventure 2 in 2020.

Each game included is a remastered version of its original release. The original compilation received mostly mixed reviews and was mostly criticized for its game selection, despite each game receiving positive reviews. The 2016 release was met with a larger positive reception, particularly for the inclusion and remaster of Jet Set Radio.

In December 2024, the game compilation and each individual title (with the exceptions of Sonic Adventure and Sonic Adventure 2) were delisted digitally across all platforms, including Steam.

== Games and content ==
The original collection includes four games from the Dreamcast: three of which were also part of the Sega All Stars budget range, plus Space Channel 5: Part 2, released simultaneously for the Dreamcast and PlayStation 2 in Japan, then later released exclusively for the PlayStation 2 outside of Japan. All games released in the bundle are available for purchase separately on the Xbox Live Arcade, PlayStation Network and Steam. A retail release for PlayStation 3 was seemingly planned but never released.

Dreamcast Collection was later reissued on July 22, 2016 for Steam, adding two games (NiGHTS into Dreams and Jet Set Radio, despite the former being originally a Sega Saturn game), which are a part of the Sega Heritage Collection. It was updated once again on April 7, 2020 to include Sonic Adventure 2, which completes the collection. The games could be purchased either collectively or individually on Steam until their removal on December 6, 2024. The extended cuts of Sonic Adventure and its sequel (released as Sonic Adventure DX: Director's Cut and Sonic Adventure 2: Battle, respectively) are included as DLC content for Microsoft Windows. DX is also available for the Xbox 360, and replaces the original game upon download.

=== List of games ===
Games included in original release
Title	Original platform	Original release
Crazy Taxi (Dreamcast port of the arcade game)	Arcade	1999
Sega Bass Fishing (Dreamcast port of the arcade game)	Arcade	1997
Sonic Adventure	Dreamcast	1998
Space Channel 5: Part 2	Dreamcast	2002
Games additionally included in the Steam reissue (Sega Heritage Collection)
Jet Set Radio	Dreamcast	2000
Nights into Dreams	Saturn	1996
Sonic Adventure 2 (Battle content available as DLC)	Dreamcast/GameCube	2001

== Reception ==
Reception

Aggregate score
Aggregator	Score
Metacritic	(Xbox 360) 53/100

Review scores
Publication	Score
Eurogamer	3/5
IGN	5/10

Dreamcast Collection received mostly mixed to negative reviews from critics, until the 2016 release for PC. While each individual and remastered title received positive reviews across all platforms, critics complained about the compilation selection as a whole rather than the quality of each title. The Xbox 360 version has an average score of 53 out of 100 on review aggregator Metacritic. IGN gave the game a 5 out of 10, writing, "SEGA's history deserves better. And so do you." Eurogamer gave the game a positive review, scoring it a three out of five stars.
