= Sonic Prime =

Animated television series

- Genre: Action comedy; Science fiction
- Based on: Sonic the Hedgehog by Sega
- Developed by: Man of Action
- Showrunner: Man of Action
- Voices of: Deven Mack; Brian Drummond; Ashleigh Ball; Adam Nurada; Shannon Chan-Kent; Ian Hanlin; Kazumi Evans; Vincent Tong
- Theme music composer: Steffan Andrews; Mike Shields
- Countries of origin: Canada; Japan; United States
- Original languages: English; Japanese
- No. of seasons: 3
- No. of episodes: 23

Production
- Executive producers: Erik Wiese; Anne Loi; Josh Scherba; Stephanie Betts; Logan McPherson; Haruki Satomi; Yukio Sugino; Shuji Utsumi; Toru Nakahara
- Producers: Melissa Beery (season 1); Morgana Duque (season 1); Nikki Eckstein (season 3); Denise Tanchanco; Hitoshi Okuno; Mayumi Tachikawa
- Running time: 22-44 minutes
- Production companies: Netflix Animation Studios; Sega Sammy Group; WildBrain Studios; Man of Action Entertainment

Original release
- Network: Netflix
- Release: December 15, 2022 – January 11, 2024

Related
- Adventures of Sonic the Hedgehog; Sonic the Hedgehog; Sonic Underground; Sonic X; Sonic Boom

Sonic Prime is an animated television series based on the Sonic the Hedgehog video game series, co-produced by Sega Sammy Group, WildBrain Studios and Man of Action Entertainment. It is the sixth animated television series based on the franchise since the last mainline series Sonic X (2003-2006), following the spin-off series Sonic Boom.

The first season, consisting of eight episodes, was released on Netflix on December 15, 2022. The second season, also consisting of eight episodes, was released on July 13, 2023. The third and final season, consisting of seven episodes, was released on January 11, 2024.

== Plot ==
During a battle with his arch-nemesis Doctor Eggman, Sonic the Hedgehog accidentally shatters the Paradox Prism, a crystalline artifact with reality-bending powers. This drastically warps reality and creates the "Shatterverse", a new section of the multiverse with five alternate dimensions called "Shatterspaces", each of them formed by one of the Prism shards and inhabited by alternative versions of Sonic's friends (Miles "Tails" Prower, Knuckles the Echidna, Amy Rose, Rouge the Bat and Big the Cat), but lacking their own versions of him.

Sonic first arrives in New Yoke City, a futuristic dystopian version of Green Hill ruled by a quintet of Doctor Eggman variants who call themselves the Chaos Council and used the power of its shard to conquer it. After learning of the Prism's existence, they seek to conquer the Shatterverse by obtaining all five shards, but are opposed by Sonic and a resistance formed from the city's inhabitants.

While attempting to reassemble the Prism and restore his reality, which became the dull and lifeless Ghost Hill following the Prism's shattering, Sonic ventures to other Shatterspaces to retrieve the shards before the council can. These Shatterspaces consist of:

- The Boscage Maze - A jungle world with primitive versions of his friends.
- The No Place - A flooded world with pirates.
- The Grim - A barren wasteland.

Along the way, he befriends the respective versions of his friends and helps them with their problems, including Nine, the New Yoke City version of Tails who has grown bitter and untrusting due to not having Sonic to help him with bullies, Rusty Rose, the New Yoke City version of Amy who was converted into a cyborg by the Chaos Council and struggles to figure out her loyalties, and Dread, the No Place version of Knuckles whose obsession with claiming his realm's shard as his personal treasure ends up alienating him with his crew.

Later, Sonic's arch-rival Shadow the Hedgehog, who managed to avoid Green Hill's destruction by using Chaos Control, reluctantly agrees to help him. Once the Chaos Council's plans for domination begin to endanger the Shatterverse, the natives of each world join the war against them and work with their counterparts.

Eventually, the Paradox Prism is reassembled, but Nine, worried that restoring the primary universe could destroy the Shatterverse and out of anger at Sonic for projecting the prime Tails onto him, takes the Prism for himself, wanting to use it to terraform the Grim into a new home. However, use of its power threatens the stability of the other Shatterspaces. Believing that the remaining Prism energy from Sonic's body could be the key to stabilizing the Prism, he creates an army of robotic versions of Sonic and his friends to hunt him down and extract it from him, although it will kill him in the process. This forces Sonic, Shadow and the rest of the Shatterverse's inhabitants to form a truce with the Chaos Council to stop Nine. Ultimately, after a climactic battle, Sonic and Nine make amends after the latter realizes the consequences of his actions, Rusty sides with the resistance after bonding with the other Amy variants: Thorn Rose and Black Rose, Dread lets go of his obsession and appoints Black as the new captain of the crew, and the Chaos Council are banished to the void for their misdeeds. Sonic then decides to use his energy to restore Green Hill and stabilize the Shatterspaces, allowing them and their inhabitants to continue existing, although doing so nearly kills him. After saying goodbye to the Shatterverse denizens, Shadow gets Sonic to the gateway in time and they return to the battle with Eggman before the shattering. They manage to stop him from obtaining the Prism.

== Characters ==
=== Main ===
- Sonic the Hedgehog (voiced by Deven Mack): A blue anthropomorphic hedgehog with the power to run at supersonic speeds. Despite being cocky, egotistical, impulsive, and careless at times, he cares deeply for his friends and works hard to protect the world from Dr. Eggman. In the different parts of the Shatterverse, Sonic's footwear grants him different abilities, such as electric capabilities in New Yoke City, climbing walls in the Boscage Maze, hovering across water in No Place, and generating hexagonal platforms and shields in the Grim.
- Shadow the Hedgehog (voiced by Ian Hanlin): A black hedgehog whose air shoes allow his speed to rival Sonic's. As a result of using Chaos Control, he was not split off into the Shatterverse like the rest of Sonic's friends. After seeing the damage the Prism's shattering caused, Shadow makes it his mission to stop Sonic from causing any more damage and help him fix his mistake.
- Miles "Tails" Prower (voiced by Ashleigh Ball): An anthropomorphic fox who is Sonic's best friend and genius inventor and can fly with his twin tails.
- Knuckles the Echidna (voiced by Adam Nurada): A red anthropomorphic echidna who likes to punch with his large fists.
- Amy Rose (voiced by Shannon Chan-Kent): A pink hedgehog who loves nature and wields her Piko Piko Hammer.
- Rouge the Bat (voiced by Kazumi Evans): A jewel-loving anthropomorphic bat who works as a spy.
- Big the Cat (voiced by Ian Hanlin): A purple anthropomorphic cat who likes to fish and is commonly seen with his pet frog Froggy.
- Birdie: A Flicky who is friends with Amy.
- Doctor Eggman (voiced by Brian Drummond): A mad scientist with an IQ of 300 who is Sonic's arch-nemesis and seeks to use the Paradox Prism for his plans.
- Orbot and Cubot (both voiced by Deven Mack): Doctor Eggman's robot henchmen with less-than-average competence. Orbot is the red, sphere-shaped robot while Cubot is the yellow, cube-shaped robot. Unlike other characters, Orbot and Cubot do not have counterparts in the Shatterverse.

=== Residing in The Grim ===
- Tails Nine (voiced by Ashleigh Ball): Tails' counterpart from New Yoke City. After being constantly bullied for his twin tails, he built seven additional mechanical tails to prove himself and get revenge. He was originally an ally of Sonic's, but later becomes his enemy and seeks to use the Paradox Prism to build his own ideal reality until Sonic has him realize the consequences of his actions after a climactic battle.
- Alpha Grim Sonic, Knuckles, Amy, Birdie and Rouge: Robot counterparts of Sonic, Knuckles, Amy, Birdie and Rouge who were created by Nine.
- Grim Big: A robot counterpart of Big who was created by Nine and is the largest of Nine's robots.

=== Residing in New Yoke City ===
- The Chaos Council: A group of five Doctor Eggman-like figures that act as dictators to New Yoke City and each control their own district. After learning of the Prism's power, they make it their mission to obtain its shards. The Chaos Council later helps Sonic when Nine goes rogue.
  - Mr. Dr. Eggman (voiced by Brian Drummond): Doctor Eggman's counterpart from New Yoke City who is the leader of the Chaos Council and wears a toupée. He is the one who claims that the Chaos Council are fragmented versions of Doctor Eggman's ego.
  - Dr. Deep (voiced by Vincent Tong): A member of the Chaos Council with a tattooed arm who speaks philosophically and has an oriental flair to him while making more flamboyant gestures than the other members. In battle, he wears a suit equipped with knives and buzzsaws.
  - Dr. Don't (voiced by Vincent Tong): A teenage member of the Chaos Council who is lazy and frequently plays video games, but is a skilled programmer. He can control the Eggforcers with his video game controller.
  - Dr. Babble (vocal effects by Vincent Tong): An infant member of the Chaos Council who, despite his young age, is as physically and intellectually capable as the other members. Although he only makes baby noises, the other members of the council appear to understand what he is saying. A flashback revealed that Dr. Babble was responsible for having the rest of the Chaos Council compromise and divide New Yoke City's districts among themselves.
  - Dr. Done-It (voiced by Brian Drummond): A member of the Chaos Council who resembles an older version of Doctor Eggman. He wields a cane that can shoot plasma lasers.
- Rusty Rose (voiced by Shannon Chan-Kent): Amy's counterpart from New Yoke City. She is a cyborg who was formerly controlled by the Chaos Council but joins Dread's crew after the Chaos Council deserts her. Rusty and Black Rose took command of Dread's crew after Dread betrayed them for one of the Prism Shards. Over the course, Rusty forms a sisterly bond with Black Rose and Thorn Rose during their conflict with Nine.
- Birdie of New Yoke City: Birdie's counterpart who was found in the chest of Rusty Rose.
- Resistance: A group of freedom fighters who oppose the Chaos Council.
  - Rebel Rouge (voiced by Kazumi Evans): Rouge's counterpart from New Yoke City. She is the leader of the Resistance.
  - Renegade Knucks (voiced by Vincent Tong): Knuckles' counterpart from New Yoke City who is a member of the Resistance. He speaks with a Brooklyn accent.
  - Squad Commander Red (voiced by Rachell Hofstetter): A cat who is a member of the Resistance.
  - Denizen 1998 (voiced by Ian Hanlin): Big's counterpart from New Yoke City. He would later side with the Resistance.
- Chaos Sonic (voiced by Deven Mack): A robot created by the Chaos Council that resembles Sonic and matches him in speed and abilities. His personality is a heavily exaggerated version of Sonic's, much to the latter's annoyance. Being a robot version of Sonic, he is similar to Metal Sonic. With help from Nine, Sonic destroyed Chaos Sonic. For this character's voice, Mack provided an impression similar to that of Jaleel White's rendition of Sonic from the 1990s DiC cartoons.
- Eggforcers (voiced by Brian Drummond and Ian Hanlin): Robots created by the Chaos Council to patrol the streets and punish those who try to step out of line.
  - Jumbo Eggforcers: A group of larger Eggforcers enhanced by the shards and working for Dr. Done-It. They possess a strong-armored body and wield different weapons like laser eyes, a buzzsaw on one hand, and a flamethrower on another hand.
- Security Drones (voiced by Kazumi Evans): Mass-produced helicopter-type robots created by the Chaos Council that patrol the Chaos Council's districts.

=== Residing in Boscage Maze ===
- Thorn Rose (voiced by Shannon Chan-Kent): Amy's primitive counterpart from the Boscage Maze. She is overprotective of the forest and attacks those who try to harm it until Sonic tricked her into attacking part of the Boscage Maze's roof over a palm tree. In Season 3, Thorn forms a close bond with her counterparts Rusty and Black Rose, viewing them as her "sisters".
  - Birdie of Boscage Maze: A giant counterpart of Birdie who serves as Thorn Rose's mode of transportation.
- The Scavengers: A primitive group that builds their society atop the trees and earned the ire of Thorn Rose for wasting the forest.
  - Prim Rouge (voiced by Kazumi Evans): Rouge's counterpart from the Boscage Maze and leader of the Scavengers.
  - Mangey Tails (vocal effects by Ashleigh Ball): Tails' counterpart from the Boscage Maze and member of the Scavengers. He acts like a wild animal commonly walking on all fours and communicating in growls. Sonic was able to teach him how to rotate his tails enough to fly in "Barking Up the Wrong Tree".
  - Hangry Cat (voiced by Ian Hanlin): Big's counterpart from the Boscage Maze and member of the Scavengers. He stops at nothing to try to scavenge any food that he can find.
  - Gnarly Knuckles (voiced by Vincent Tong): Knuckles' paranoid counterpart from the Boscage Maze who is a member of the Scavengers.

=== Residing in No Place ===
- The Kraken's crew (The Angel Voyage Crew): The crew of the pirate ship known as the Angel Voyage.
  - Black Rose (voiced by Shannon Chan-Kent): Amy's counterpart from No Place who is a member of Knuckles the Dread's crew. She and Rusty Rose later take command of Dread's crew after he betrays them for one of the Prism Shards. In the series' climax, Black Rose is officially given the title of captain by the reformed Dread.
  - Knuckles the Dread (voiced by Vincent Tong): Knuckles' counterpart from No Place who is the captain of his ship, the Angel's Voyage. He is seemingly laid-back. Unlike the rest of his crew, Knuckles appears to show trust in Sonic immediately. Black Rose and Rusty Rose later take command of his crew after he betrays them for one of the Prism Shards. After an ultimate change of heart, Dread officially names Black Rose the new captain.
  - Sails Tails (voiced by Ashleigh Ball): Tails' counterpart from No Place who created a mechanical arm on his belt to perform more tasks simultaneously.
  - Batten Rouge (voiced by Kazumi Evans): Rouge's counterpart from No Place who is a member of Knuckles the Dread's crew and shows loyalty to the current captain.
  - Catfish (voiced by Ian Hanlin): Big's counterpart from No Place who is frequently seen playing music for the crew to sing songs to.
- Jack (voiced by Seán McLoughlin): A raccoon and former member of Knuckles the Dread's crew. After a voyage caused the crew to lose their ship, he and the other crew members left Dread and formed their own crew with him as the leader.
  - Stormbeard (voiced by Brian Drummond): A dog and former member of Knuckles the Dread's crew who left and formed a crew with Jack.
  - Bunny Bones (voiced by Ashleigh Ball): A cat and former member of Knuckles the Dread's crew who left and formed a crew with Jack.

== Episodes ==
=== Series overview ===
Season	Episodes	Originally released
1	8	December 10, 2022 (Ep.1; Roblox) December 15, 2022 (Netflix) December 24, 2022 (Ep. 1; YouTube)
2	8	July 4, 2023 (Ep. 1; YouTube) July 13, 2023 (Netflix) July 18, 2023 (Ep. 2; YouTube)
3	7	January 5, 2024 (Ep. 1; YouTube) January 11, 2024 (Netflix) January 18, 2024 (Ep. 2; YouTube)

=== Season 1 (2022) ===
No.	Title	Directed by	Written by	Original release date	Nickelodeon air date
1	"Shattered"	Erik Wiese	Man of Action & Erik Wiese	December 10, 2022 (Roblox premiere)	December 7, 2024
1	"Shattered"	Erik Wiese	Man of Action & Erik Wiese	December 15, 2022 (Netflix)	December 7, 2024
1	"Shattered"	Erik Wiese	Man of Action & Erik Wiese	December 24, 2022 (YouTube)	December 7, 2024
While fighting his arch-nemesis, Dr. Eggman, Sonic the Hedgehog destroys the Paradox Prism, an ancient artifact with immense power. This causes a ripple in the space-time continuum, separating Sonic from his friends and sending him to New Yoke City (pun on New York City), a dystopian high tech version of Green Hill in a parallel universe ruled by the Chaos Council, a group made up of five Eggman variants known as Dr. Babble, Dr. Done It, Dr. Deep, Dr. Don't, and Mr. Dr. Eggman. While traveling through his new surroundings, Sonic discovers he has absorbed the Paradox Prism's energy, but his equipment is unable to handle this power. He encounters Nine, a variant of his best friend Tails who constructed mechanized tails to fight back against his childhood bullies due to not having Sonic to help him. Sonic earns Nine's trust and he modifies Sonic's shoes and gloves to attune to his newfound powers. However, Sonic and Nine are captured and Sonic is taken for tests run by Rusty Rose, a variant of Amy Rose turned into a subservient cyborg. When the Council threatens Nine, Sonic pushes his powers to the max, causing him to generate a massive amount of energy. However, he notices what seems to be a hallucination of his rival Shadow the Hedgehog during the surge and flashbacks to an earlier confrontation with him.: Note: This episode is double-length.
2	"The Yoke's on You"	Erik Wiese	Man of Action & Erik Wiese	December 15, 2022	December 14, 2024
In a flashback, Shadow receives a vision of Sonic causing the world to shatter after feeling the impact he caused when he attacked Eggman's Badniks. Shadow questions Sonic's actions and attempts to stop him from reaching Eggman to prevent the impending catastrophe. However, his hostile tactics and cryptic warnings make Sonic misunderstand his intention, and they fight before Sonic slows him down enough to reach Eggman. Back in the present, Sonic's energy surge creates an electromagnetic pulse that causes New Yoke City to temporarily black out and causing the Council to realize it could be a source of power. They come to the decision to dissect Sonic and strip him of his powers. However, resistance fighters Rebel Rouge and Renegade Knucks, variants of Rouge the Bat and Knuckles the Echidna, arrive and rescue him and Nine, but are cornered by Rusty Rose and the Badniks.
3	"Escape from New Yoke"	Erik Wiese	Man of Action & Erik Wiese	December 15, 2022	December 21, 2024
After destroying most of the Badniks, Sonic, Nine, and the Resistance decide to take the opportunity to steal the "Crystal" that gives the Council supreme power. Nine successfully takes over Rusty Rose's programming, making her fight alongside them. When closing in on the power source's location, Sonic and Nine are separated from Rebel, Knucks, and Rusty who buy them time by fighting against the enemy while Sonic and Nine get the power source. It is revealed that the Crystal is a shard of the Paradox Prism, and Sonic realizes that he caused the world to change after he destroyed the Paradox Prism. Sonic refrains from touching the shard, but does so at Nine's insistence, sending him to another universe.
4	"Unwelcome to the Jungle"	Erik Wiese & Kiran Sangherra	Brittany Jo Flores	December 15, 2022	December 28, 2024
Sonic is sent to the jungle world of Boscage Maze, where he meets Prim, Hangry, Gnarly, and Mangey, primitive versions of Rouge, Big the Cat, Knuckles, and Tails who live in the trees in fear of a "monster" down below. They decide to use Sonic's speed to distract the monster long enough to get food and falsely promise Sonic they will help him find a shard of the Paradox Prism in exchange. While looking for food, the monster drives them away and leaves Sonic to face it alone. It is revealed to be Thorn Rose, a variant of Amy, and her giant bird, Birdie. Thorn explains that Prim and the others are scavengers who have ravaged the jungle, so she is fighting them to protect it. During the fight, Thorn notices the light from Sonic's shoes is similar to "The Great Green". Believing it to be a shard of the prism, Sonic convinces Thorn to escort him to it by promising he will leave afterward. The Great Green that Thorn refers to is actually a coconut tree that Sonic recognizes from his world, empowered by the Prism Shard. Sonic digs the Shard out from beneath the tree using his gear, but Thorn deems him as another scavenger and claims it.
5	"Barking Up the Wrong Tree"	Erik Wiese	Patricia Villetto	December 15, 2022	January 4, 2025
Sonic tries to grab the shard from Thorn, who uses its powers to make the jungle impenetrable for the scavengers, but fails and is forced to retreat. Sonic decides to persuade the scavengers to make peace with Thorn, but they reveal that they and Thorn were once friends until she became disgusted at their abuse of the natural resources and grew obsessed with protecting the forest, driving them away. Sonic arranges for both sides to meet up and talk, but the scavengers seize the opportunity to attack her instead. Realizing that the only way to get the two sides to make peace is by making Thorn see the harm she has done to the jungle after noticing that the coconut tree has withered due to lack of sunlight, Sonic tricks Thorn into fighting him. He then knocks her hammer and the shard through the branches enough to cause a big hole, revealing the condition of the tree and healing it. This helps Thorn realize the error of her ways and reveal her side of the scavengers' story; she tried to warn them about their abuse, but they ignored her, eventually causing her to snap and attack them, which she later came to regret. This leads her to reconcile with the Scavengers, who also agree to help conserve the environment. As Birdy takes flight through the hole, Sonic teaches Mangey how to rotate his tails enough to fly. Sonic goes to get the shard, but after coming into contact with it, he has a vision of Shadow and is warped back to New Yoke City.
6	"Situation: Grim"	Erik Wiese	Marcus Rinehart	December 15, 2022	May 24, 2025
Sonic is rocketed back to the war-torn New Yoke City and learns that weeks have passed there since his departure. It is revealed that after he vanished, Nine fled with the shard, leaving Knucks and Rebel at the Badniks' mercy, with Rusty returning to her original programming. As a result, Rebel and the Resistance are distrustful of Sonic. After he is taken to the Resistance's hideout, Rebel shows Sonic their version of the coconut tree, the only natural tree left and a symbol of the life they deserve. The Chaos Council tracks Sonic's position through the traces of the shard's energy from him and attacks the Resistance's hideout. Nine appears in an airship powered by the Shatter Drive, a machine that allows him to use the stolen shard's powers to open portals between the Shatterverse, the void between the worlds, which he calls Shatterspaces. Nine takes Sonic with him to a barren Shatterspace called the Grim where he intends to rebuild the world and their lives. Sonic refuses to abandon the rebels and Nine reluctantly sends him back to New Yoke City, but has a change of heart and joins them. While Sonic and the Resistance successfully defeat the Eggforcers attacking them, the Chaos Council unleashes their flying fortress, the Mothership, and captures Nine.
7	"It Takes One to No Place"	Erik Wiese	Omar Spahi	December 15, 2022	May 31, 2025
While searching for Nine, Sonic sees an apparent apparition of Shadow, who managed to escape the universe's shattering using Chaos Control, but is now trapped in the void, telling him to keep going. His Shatter-boosted powers kick in and teleport him into another Shatterspace, the deep seas of No Place where he meets Batten, Sails, Black Rose, and Catfish; pirate versions of Rouge, Tails, Amy, and Big led by the legendary pirate Knuckles the Dread. They welcome Sonic into their crew, as they find his speed useful, and he helps them defeat Dread's former crew. Dread explains that he was a feared pirate who, along with his former crew, aimed for a treasure called the Devil's Lighthouse, which is actually a shard of the Paradox Prism. However, they ended up shipwrecked and Dread's former crew deserted him. Sonic insists on getting the shard, so Dread makes him the captain. Rusty Rose and a group of Eggforcers unexpectedly arrive on a submarine and attack the pirates.
8	"There's No ARRGH in "Team""	Erik Wiese	Justin Peniston	December 15, 2022	June 7, 2025
After capturing Nine, the Chaos Council seizes the Shatter Drive for their plans to conquer the Shatterverse, but Nine convinces them to keep Sonic alive to learn of his unique ability to travel across the Shatterverse, which they reluctantly agree to. Meanwhile, in No Place, Sonic and the pirates attempt to fight back against Rusty Rose. After replicating the Prism energy compass mod from Sonic's sneakers to find the Shard, Rusty prepares to destroy them, but hesitates and leaves after seeing her Pirate counterpart. As the ship begins to sink, Sonic convinces the runaway Dread to return, and after realizing that succeeding where he failed would restore his reputation, he resumes command and sails to the Devil's Lighthouse. While Sonic and the pirates defeat and capture Rusty, Dread, obsessed with getting the Shard, is ambushed by Badniks and knocked off the mountain. Sonic saves him before touching the shard and disappearing back into the Void. He is confronted by Shadow, who reveals that their original universe no longer exists because of Sonic's actions.

=== Season 2 (2023) ===
No. overall	No. in season	Title	Directed by	Written by	Original release date	Nickelodeon air date
9	1	"Avoid the Void"	Erik Wiese & Logan McPherson	Erik Wiese & Logan McPherson; Story by : Marcus Rinehart	July 4, 2023 (YouTube premiere)	June 14, 2025
9	1	"Avoid the Void"	Erik Wiese & Logan McPherson	Erik Wiese & Logan McPherson; Story by : Marcus Rinehart	July 13, 2023 (Netflix)	June 14, 2025
Following the shattering of the Paradox Prism, Shadow was trapped in the void, only able to enter the Shatterspace of Ghost Hill, their now barren original universe, and briefly able to contact Sonic when he uses his powers. After Sonic is sent back into the Void, Shadow finally confronts him and tells him that he destroyed their reality by shattering the Prism and can teleport himself by amplifying the Prism energy in his body when he uses his speed. After explaining his situation, Shadow takes Sonic to the Prism's resting place in Ghost Hill, where a shard is located, and explains that he believes bringing the shards to this world and connecting them could restore their main universe. However, refusing to trust Sonic and Nine, Shadow decides to take Sonic's regulators and find the shards himself. Sonic and Shadow clash throughout Ghost Hill before Shadow returns to the Void, with Sonic gaining control of his Prism energy and pursuing him. When they both see the Chaos Council's mothership heading for Boscage Maze, Shadow unsuccessfully attempts to follow after it. After Sonic saves Shadow from falling into the black hole, he reluctantly decides to trust him and work together to fix their reality as Sonic enters the Boscage Maze.
10	2	"Battle in the Boscage"	Andrew Duncan & Kiran Sangherra	Marcus Rinehart	July 13, 2023 (Netflix)	October 4, 2025
10	2	"Battle in the Boscage"	Andrew Duncan & Kiran Sangherra	Marcus Rinehart	July 18, 2023 (YouTube)	October 4, 2025
The Chaos Council's mothership enters the Boscage Maze, and Babble and Don't are tasked with finding its shard. The captured Nine is also forced to help them, as he knows how to locate the shard. However, Thorn Rose fights back against the Council's Eggforcers, and asks the other inhabitants of the Boscage Maze for help. Prim believes that they should give up the shard rather than fight, while Sonic helps Thorn fight the Eggforcers. Realizing that Sonic is in the same world, Nine secretly hacks into one of the Eggforcers to communicate with him. Thorn and Sonic fight Dr. Babble's mech, but Thorn flees after realizing that the two doctors know the shard is with Birdie. Nine uses the Eggforcer to upgrade Sonic's regulators so they can communicate and Sonic can hold the Prism shards without being teleported. The Eggforcers surround Thorn and Birdie, but Sonic and the other Boscage Maze inhabitants join the fight. Sonic tells Thorn to give him the shard so he can lure the Eggforcers away, but when this fails, Sonic uses the shard to destroy the Eggforcers, though they take it in the process. Sonic follows the mothership into the Void, but Nine tells him to focus on getting the next shard before the Council. Shadow, who agrees, knocks Sonic into No Place.
11	3	"Second Wind"	Ishi Rudell	Charlotte Fullerton	July 13, 2023	October 11, 2025
The Chaos Council task Deep and Done It with tracking down the shard in No Place. Dread and his crew have claimed the shard and the Chaos Council's battleship, as well as capturing Rusty Rose. Deep and Done It are able to track the crew down using Rusty, however after claiming the shard for themselves, they abandon her; feeling betrayed, she decides to join Dread's crew. With Rusty's help they get the battleship operational again and give chase to the Doctors, with Sonic rejoining and helping them fight to reclaim the shard. When Deep takes the shard, Dread tasks Sonic to take it back while they continue fighting the Eggforcers; however, intending to keep the shard all to himself, he lies to the crew that he deserted them, causing them to turn against Sonic once he returns.
12	4	"No Way Out"	Joel Salaysay	Patricia Villetto	July 13, 2023	October 18, 2025
Dread's crew's antagonistic behavior forces Sonic to flee with the shard as the pirates pursue him. While the Council's mothership retrieves the doctors, Shadow tries to delay them in the Void. After Dread's crew manages to catch up with Sonic and seize the shard, Dr. Deep and Dr. Done-It attack them. Sonic proves his innocence by helping them fight back as Dread abandons them and flees with the shard. When Sonic retrieves the shard and attempts to leave No Place, he is interrupted by the mothership’s arrival. The Chaos Council holds Sonic's friends hostage and demands the shard, but he distracts them by throwing it away, giving his friends a chance to free themselves. As the Council takes the shard and prepares to leave, Dread secretly hides on the mothership and Sonic gives chase with help from the crew.
13	5	"A Madness to Their Methods"	Andrew Duncan & Kiran Sangherra	Justin Peniston	July 13, 2023	October 25, 2025
After returning to New Yoke City, the Chaos Council uses their new shards to power up their Eggforcers against the resistance. Sonic joins Rebel and Knucks, and the Resistance decide to help Sonic end the Council once and for all. Dr. Deep comes up with a plan involving recycled Eggforcer parts. Each member of the Council add their own touches to their Eggforcers to counter Sonic, but they all fail. Meanwhile, Mr. Dr. Eggman decides to have a conversation with Nine in order to form a plan to defeat Sonic, with Nine unintentionally informing him they need to think like Sonic. Nine contacts Sonic and instructs him to enter the Council's fortress with Rebel and Knucks following, only to encounter a robot resembling Sonic.
14	6	"Double Trouble"	Ishi Rudell	Marcus Rinehart	July 13, 2023	November 1, 2025
A flashback revealed how the Chaos Council established New Yoke City. As Mr. Dr. Eggman, Dr. Done-It, Dr. Deep, and Dr. Don't argue over leadership, Dr. Babble suggests that they compromise and divide the districts among themselves. The robot, which introduces itself as Chaos Sonic, fights Sonic across New Yoke, leaving Rebel and Knucks to fight the Eggforcers. After slowing down his double, Sonic joins Rebel and Knucks, but they are ambushed by Chaos Sonic, as Dread assists them. When the Chaos Council use the shards to open portals to their respective Shatterspaces and terraform them, Nine seizes the opportunity to escape and helps Sonic destroy Chaos Sonic. Now reunited, Sonic and Nine claim the shards, but are cornered by the Council.
15	7	"Cracking Down"	Joel Salaysay	Patricia Villetto	July 13, 2023	November 8, 2025
After initially escaping New Yoke City as seen in a flashback, Nine arrives in the Grim and uses its shard and his own to perform tests in hopes of making it habitable. In the present, Sonic and Nine escape the Council with the shards and reach the latter's ship to leave, but are shot down, forcing them to flee on foot while Rusty and Black Rose fight off the Council. Unable to build up enough speed to enter the Void, the two decide to use the unstable portals opened by the Council. They enter No Place, where Nine meets his counterpart; with Sonic still unable to build enough speed, they return to New Yoke City where they are ambushed by Dread. Knucks and Rebel distract him while Sonic and Nine enter Boscage. There, they meet Thorn, who fights the Council's forces along with Rusty and Black, giving Sonic the chance to gain enough speed to enter the Void, where Shadow catches them. The trio enter Ghost Hill, where Nine says he needs time and silence to assemble the Prism. Sonic and Shadow decide to wait outside, where they witness the Chaos Council's arrival.
16	8	"Ghost of a Chance"	Andrew Duncan & Kiran Sangherra	Marcus Rinehart	July 13, 2023	November 15, 2025
The Chaos Council arrives in Ghost Hill to retrieve the Prism Shards. Sonic and Shadow fend them off while Nine works to reconstruct the Paradox Prism. Sonic's reality is momentarily restored, showing that the reconstruction is working. Deep and Babble are dispatched and upgraded with Prism energy to distract Sonic and Shadow and overpower them while Eggforcers attack Nine. At his request, Nine infuses Sonic with additional energy from the Prism, allowing him to defeat Dr. Babble and Dr. Deep. Mr. Dr. Eggman, refusing to admit defeat, creates a prismatic Titan of his original counterpart and sends it toward the Prism. Nine infuses Sonic with more Prism energy to match the Titan's and destroy it. After the battle, Sonic sees that Green Hill is still not restored, and Nine reveals that there is a Shard in the Grim. He also reveals that he never truly intended to help Sonic restore his world and that he needed the Ghost Prism as a blueprint to use the Paradox Prism to turn the Grim into a new home. Sonic tries to convince him otherwise, since he thought Nine would see things the same way as Tails would. Believing that he and the rest of the Shatterverse would disappear if he restored Sonic's original universe, Nine berates Sonic for his recklessness which resulted in the shattering of his reality and for not considering others' feelings. Deciding he can trust no one but himself, Nine betrays Sonic and takes the shards for himself before leaving for the Grim, leaving a betrayed and depressed Sonic and a vengeful Shadow alone on the mountain.

=== Season 3 (2024) ===
No. overall	No. in season	Title	Directed by	Written by	Original release date	Nickelodeon air date
17	1	"Grim Tidings"	Ishi Rudell	Chris Milan	January 5, 2024 (YouTube premiere)	May 15, 2026
17	1	"Grim Tidings"	Ishi Rudell	Chris Milan	January 11, 2024 (Netflix)	May 15, 2026
Nine, who still trusts himself than anyone else, takes the shards to the Grim to rebuild the Paradox Prism, which he uses to transform it and build his own fortress. This causes the Shatterspaces to decay, though Sonic and Shadow manage to escape into the Void as the gateway to Ghost Hill explodes while the Chaos Council flees back to New Yoke City. Sonic and Shadow go to confront Nine, but realize his actions have caused the Grim's gateway to start collapsing. However, Sonic and Shadow manage to enter through a crack in the side of the gateway. Nine refuses to listen to Sonic, instead using the Prism energy to create Alpha Grim Sonic, another robotic version of Sonic. Sonic and Shadow manage to subdue Alpha Grim Sonic, but Nine reveals robotic clones of Sonic's friends, who battle the two. Sonic tries to convince Nine to realize the Grim is starting to decay, but Nine insists he needs Sonic's energy to stabilize the Prism. Knowing that Nine is after Sonic and his power, Shadow generates a cyclone that launches Sonic into the sky and out of the Grim. Nine clones Grim Birdie to hunt down Sonic's energy while Shadow is overwhelmed by the robots.
18	2	"Dome Sweet Dome"	Joel Salaysay	Patricia Viletto	January 11, 2024 (Netflix)	May 22, 2026
18	2	"Dome Sweet Dome"	Joel Salaysay	Patricia Viletto	January 18, 2024 (YouTube)	May 22, 2026
Sonic manages to escape from Alpha Grim Birdie and its minions before re-entering New Yoke City to find backup. As Sonic is further pursued by Grim Birdie and attempts to evade Nine who manipulates the Shatterspace to endanger civilians so he can tire himself out rescuing them, Rebel, Renegade, and the other Shatterspace variants come together to fight by his side. With help from the Chaos Council, Sonic and his allies disable the Grimions, forcing Alpha Grim Birdie to retreat. Sonic negotiates with the Chaos Council to give New Yoke City's citizens sanctuary in exchange for recharging the Mothership's Shatterdrive using his Prism-kicked powers to activate its force field, protecting them from Nine's attacks. As Sonic tries to broker peace between his comrades, Catfish, Sails, and Batten are trapped on a sinking ship in a rapidly-decaying No Place.
19	3	"No Escape"	Andrew Duncan & Kiran Sangherra	Marcus Rinehart	January 11, 2024	May 29, 2026
Sonic and Black Rose discover that Sails, Catfish, and Batten are stranded in No Place while Nine dispatches more Grim Birdies in an attempt to capture Sonic. With the Roses joining him, Sonic leads a risky rescue mission as they set off for No Place. In the ensuing battle, the pirates are rescued, but Black Rose's ship is shot down and nearly crashes. However, Dr. Done-It comes to their aid, allowing them to escape No Place. Once the team returns to New Yoke City, Sonic, after receiving advice from the Chaos Council, decides to give himself up to Nine, negotiating that if he does so, he spares the denizens, to which Nine agrees. Sonic heads to the Grim as he confronts Nine, reminding him that, despite his actions, he still considers him his friend. Before Nine can siphon Sonic's Prism energy, the denizens open a portal into the dome from the Chaos Council having tracked Sonic by locking on to his energy signature, to assist him, putting Nine in high alert.
20	4	"Nine's Lives"	Ishi Rudell	Justin Peniston	January 11, 2024	June 5, 2026
Sonic's allies come together to fight alongside him. Nine uses the Prism's power to create an army of Grimions, and the two forces fight. Sonic and his friends are initially outmatched, but Mangey and Sails take a destroyed Grimion and use its parts to create a powerful bomb, seemingly sacrificing themselves amidst the explosion. Sonic rallies his quarreling allies to work together, deciding to let Rebel take the lead. She organizes a plan; the pirates and Scavengers will sneak into Nine's fortress to deprive him of the Prism's power, while Rebel, Renegade, and the Chaos Council distract him. Rebel also orders Sonic to hang back and provide support, as Nine is targeting him. The group begins to turn things around by working together and continue providing support to the others, much to Nine's confusion and chagrin. Further irritated, Nine uses more Prism energy to summon a gigantic robotic version of Big, namely Grim Big.
21	5	"Home Sick Home"	Kiran Sangherra and Erik Wiese	Patricia Viletto	January 11, 2024	June 12, 2026
Nine unleashes Grim Big on the Resistance, who are easily overwhelmed as he creates more Grimions. Sonic is cornered and pushed into a chasm, only to be saved by Shadow. With Shadow joining the fight, Sonic continues providing assistance, but Grim Big attacks with devastating firepower. After Nine loses more Grimions to Mr. Dr. Eggman's mothership, Grim Big attacks it and disables its lasers. The Roses and Dr. Done-It cover aerial support while Mr. Dr. Eggman repairs the laser cannons. Nine notices the scavengers coming and siphons more Prism energy to stop them, weakening Grim Big and the other robots. However, before Grim Big can attack again, the cannons destroy it. With Grim Big destroyed, the team moves in on Nine's fortress. However, Nine destroys the Mothership, forcing Mr. Dr. Eggman to escape, with Dr. Done-It's ship also shot down. Sonic calls up his comrades and forms up a plan to beat Nine. Nine forms more Grimions. As Sonic's allies are overwhelmed, angered, he intercepts and battles Nine.
22	6	"The Devil Is in the Tails"	Kiran Sangherra and Erik Wiese	Logan McPherson	January 11, 2024	June 19, 2026
Sonic battles Nine, who uses more energy to overpower him. As he falls off the fortress, Sonic uncovers a new ability in his Grim shoes: creating hexagonal footholds and shields to protect himself from Nine's attacks along with attacking Nine in turn. Angry at being beaten by Sonic, Nine absorbs a lot more Prism energy. As the Grimions lose nearly all of their power, the resistance reveals their ruse; Sonic planned to make Nine think he won to catch him off guard. As Nine becomes increasingly aggressive from overexerting of the Prism energy, the others destroy the Alpha bots and disable the Grimions. Having survived their apparent demise, Sails and Mangey take control of Grim Big's remains to help turn the tide of the battle, meanwhile Renegade joins Sonic against Nine, who has some Alpha bots attack them. Alpha Grim Sonic tries to join them, but is intervened by Shadow, who knocks him off the fortress and combats him. Sonic, realizing that Nine's excessive use of the Prism's power has nearly destroyed the Shatterverse, stops Renegade from attacking Nine, and tries to talk to Nine, who sends a static shockwave to push Sonic and Renegade away and sends for the remaining Alpha bots. Alpha Grim Sonic disrupts Shadow before surrounding Sonic and Renegade, but Shadow recovers and destroys it along with the remaining Alpha bots. Angry at the loss of his robot army, Nine uses more the prism energy and begins to electric shock Shadow and Renegade while Sonic shields himself. Realizing that Nine will not stop his attack, Sonic shoves Nine and himself into the fortress, where they continue to fight.
23	7	"From the Top"	Kiran Sangherra and Erik Wiese	Chris Milan	January 11, 2024	June 26, 2026
Sonic and Nine fall into the fortress, and as Sonic tries to protect himself from him, he discovers his hammock near the entrance and realizes he failed to appreciate Nine's efforts to make a home for them both. As Nine fights him, Sonic tries to reason with him, but Nine refuses to listen. Meanwhile, the denizens force their way inside, with the dome having shrunken from the Prism energy. Sonic apologizes to Nine for his actions, causing him to relent and realize the error of his ways. After Sonic urges him to find a solution to the matter, Nine suggests draining the sliver of energy from Sonic to restore the Prism, but warns him that he may cease to exist. Despite this, Sonic agrees, siphoning his Prism energy and destroying the reactors on his gear. With the Prism fixed, the Chaos Council double-cross the group to take it, but Sonic lures them into quarreling over who should have control of it, allowing the denizens to catch them off guard and teleport them into the Void. With a gateway to Green Hill open, the Shatterverse denizens part ways with Sonic before helping him reach the gateway. Running low on time, Shadow carries Sonic to the gateway before he fades from existence, returning him back to the battle in the cave moments before he shattered the Prism. Happy to see his old friends and arch-enemy again, Sonic cooperates with them and they defeat Eggman, before Shadow arrives and teleports himself and the Prism away to an unknown location, foiling Eggman's plot. Later, Sonic and the rest of his friends are relaxing on the beach after the battle. As soon as Sonic begins to tell his friends about his adventures in the Shatterverse, an explosion and subsequent shockwave blows them back and causes Sonic to drop the tray of chili dogs he'd made to share with them, all while a massive unknown object appears offscreen (although its shadowy shade is visible). After mobilizing the rest of the team to join him in battle, Sonic peels out, speeding towards this new threat head-on.

== Production ==
Sonic Prime was officially announced in February 2021, though the development of the series was initially revealed in a deleted tweet in December 2020. 24 half-hour episodes were ordered. Colleen O'Shaughnessey, known for portraying Miles "Tails" Prower since 2014, responded to a tweet on Twitter that she would not be reprising the role in the Netflix series, due to Canadian content and union laws meaning that a large portion of voice actors portraying roles in Canadian television programs have to be Canadian. In May 2022, it was announced that Deven Mack would voice the titular character for the series.

Sonic Prime is made by Man of Action, WildBrain Studios, and Sega's animation studio Marza Animation Planet. It is the second collaboration between Man of Action and WildBrain Studios (then known as DHX Media) for a series based on a video game franchise after Mega Man: Fully Charged. This is also the fourth Sonic the Hedgehog animated series under WildBrain's portfolio, as the company previously acquired Cookie Jar Group in October 2012, which in turn, acquired DIC Entertainment in July 2008. As a result, WildBrain also currently owns the rights to Adventures of Sonic the Hedgehog, Sonic the Hedgehog (SatAM), and Sonic Underground respectively.

One of the writers, Duncan Rouleau, stated that the series would be set in "the video game universe created by Sonic Team" and that "possible Sega crossovers [were] not ruled out." According to executive producer Logan McPherson, the series is canon to the games' timeline. In June 2021, concept art of the series was discovered on a now-deleted artist's portfolio.

Duncan Rouleau later confirmed that Ian Flynn, who has written for the Archie comics, Sonic Boom, the IDW comics, and the newly-released game Sonic Frontiers, would be a consultant. Additionally, The Willoughbys director Kris Pearn worked on the series as a creative consultant with My Little Pony: Equestria Girls director Ishi Rudell as an episodic director.

== Release ==
The show's 24 half-hour episodes were split up into three seasons. The first season, consisting of a double-length premiere episode and seven regular episodes, was released on December 15, 2022. The first episode premiered on Gamefam's Sonic game on Roblox, Sonic Speed Simulator, on December 10, 2022. The first episode of the first season premiered on YouTube on December 24, 2022.

Season 2, comprising eight further episodes, was released on July 13, 2023. The first episode of season 2 premiered on YouTube on July 4, 2023. On July 14, just a day after the release of the second season, writer Duncan Rouleau revealed that the third season will be released at some point in January 2024. Four days later on July 18, 2023, the second episode of season 2 premiered on YouTube. The third season, consisting of the remaining seven episodes, was released on January 11, 2024. The first episode of season 3 premiered on YouTube on January 5, 2024. The second episode of season 3 premiered on YouTube on January 18, 2024.

On December 5, 2024, WildBrain announced that Nickelodeon had acquired pay broadcast rights to the series in the United States, Australia, Italy, Germany, Austria, Switzerland, and the UK and Ireland. In the US and Australia, the series began airing two days later on December 7, 2024. On July 15, 2025, WildBrain and Nickelodeon extended their broadcast partnership for the series to include APAC, EMEA and Latin American territories beginning on July 21.

== Home media ==
The first two seasons of Sonic Prime were released on Blu-ray, while all three seasons are available on Digital. NCircle Entertainment released the first season on Blu-ray and Digital on March 12, 2024. The second season was also released on Blu-ray and Digital on August 27, 2024 as well. The third season got a Digital release on February 25, 2025. The complete series was released in Australia on June 4, 2025 by Madman Entertainment. A complete series Blu-ray steelbook was released on June 24, 2025.

== Reception ==
=== Audience viewership ===
On December 20, 2022, Netflix announced that Sonic Prime was ranked number five of the top 10 on English television to be watched with 27.7 million hours watched between December 12 and 18.

=== Critical response ===
Sonic Prime received generally positive reviews from critics with praise given to the voice acting, story, and animation; but some criticized its writing, with a few calling it "repetitive". On Rotten Tomatoes, season one holds a 60% approval rating based on reviews from 5 critics, with an average score of 6.3/10.

Polly Conway of Common Sense Media said that it is a fun, frenetic animated series that touts teamwork, also mentioning that it features violence. Kennet Seward Jr of IGN gave season one a score of 8 out of 10, calling it a "fun and family-friendly" show for new and old fans, said "Sonic Prime is a fun and overall entertaining, family-friendly show. Sitting tonally between the 1993 Adventures of Sonic the Hedgehog and 93’ Sonic the Hedgehog – which features a similar 'freedom fighters seeking to overthrow a cruel leader' vibe – it offers an exciting look at the past while presenting some new ideas. It has some issues concerning pacing and the abrupt ending of the first season won't do it any favors. That said, Sonic Prime should be well received by new and longtime franchise fans."

Joshua Kristian Mccoy of Game Rant gave Prime 3.5 out of 5, labeling it "very good" and also calling it a lot of fun: "Sonic Prime is yet another argument for Sonic as a TV star first and a game character second. Sonic fans will love the showcase for their favorite characters and the fast-paced action. Despite some weak writing and a bit too much repetition, Sonic Prime is a lot of fun. Enjoy the Blue Blur's journey into the multiverse."

=== Accolades ===
Accolades for Sonic Prime
Year	Award	Category	Nominee(s)	Result
2023	Leo Awards	Best Animated Program or Series	Sonic Prime	Nominated
2023	Leo Awards	Best Direction Animation	Kiran Sangherra and Ishi Rudell ("Escape from New Yoke")	Nominated
2023	Leo Awards	Best Sound in an Animated Program or Series	Jeff Davis, Fanny Riguidel, Gregorio Gomez, David Green and Kerthekan Balasubramaniam ("The Yoke's on You")	Nominated
2023	Leo Awards	Best Original Music, Animation	Steffan Andrews and Mike Shields ("Situation: Grim")	Nominated
2023	Leo Awards	Best Art Direction in an Animated program or series	Alan Cook ("Escape from New Yoke")	Nominated
2023	Children's and Family Emmy Awards	Individual Achievement in Animation	Joey Pogoy, Sonic Prime	Won
2024	Leo Awards	Best Direction, Animation Series	Erik Wiese and Logan McPherson ("Avoid the Void")	Nominated
2024	Leo Awards	Best Voice Performance, Animation Series	Ian Hanlin ("Avoid the Void")	Nominated
2024	Canadian Cinema Editors Awards	Best Editing in Animation	Orion McCaw, Margaret Reid, Rob Smith, Matthew Innanen and Maddison Varas ("Avoid the Void")	Nominated
2024	UBCP/ACTRA Awards	Best Voice Performance	Brian Drummond ("No Escape")	Won
2025	ACTRA Toronto	Outstanding Performance Gender Non-Conforming or Male Voice	Deven Mack ("From the Top")	Won

== In other media ==
Select characters from Sonic Prime were featured in the mobile games Sonic Dash and Sonic Forces Speed Battle in 2022 to coincide with the series' release. Dash was later re-released with additional Prime content via Netflix's mobile game service in July 2023, under the name Sonic Prime Dash, to promote the second season. Nine, Rusty Rose, and Dread appear as playable characters in the 2025 video game Sonic Racing: CrossWorlds through downloadable content (DLC).

IDW Publishing produced a comic book adaptation of the series. The first volume released on May 13, 2025.
