= Y2Kountry =

Sirius XM satellite radio channel

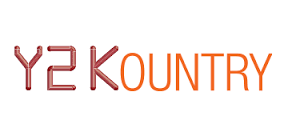
- Logo used from 2014 to 2026.

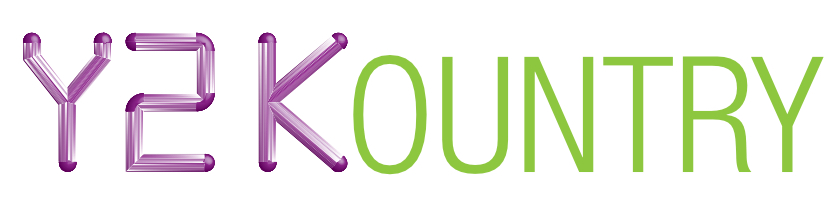
- Broadcast area: United States; Canada
- Frequencies: Sirius XM Radio 57; Dish Network 6057
- RDS: Hear the essential country hits from earlier in this millennium
- Branding: This Millennium’s Country Hits

Programming
- Format: Country music from the 2000s and the 2010s (2000-2019).

Ownership
- Owner: Sirius XM Radio

History
- First air date: July 17, 2014
- Former frequencies: Sirius XM Radio 61

Technical information
- Class: Satellite Radio Station

Links
- Website: Y2Kountry Website

Y2Kountry is a hits-oriented country radio channel on Sirius XM Radio 57 and Dish Network 6057, which centers on the 2000s and the 2010s (2000-2019). The channel is also available through the Sirius XM internet service, and through its app through iPad, iPhone and Android devices. Y2Kountry debuted on July 17, 2014, originally, as a country channel centered on the late 1990s, the 2000s, and the early 2010s (1997-2012). It pre-empted former Sirius XM Pops and Sirius XM's sister channel The Highway.

Trace Adkins was the original host of a weekend countdown called Throwback 30, counting down the 30 country hits of the 2000s and 2010s. Since 2025, however, the Throwback 30 has been hosted by Ania Hammar, who is also a host on The Highway. Danielle Peck has her own show in primetime. Buzz Brainard is a host in the mornings, called Mornings with Buzz. Al Skop has a weekday show during the late morning to early afternoon.

== Notable hosts ==
- Buzz Brainard
- Danielle Peck
- Al Skop
- Ania Hammar
- Ashley Till
- Kim Ashley

== Core Artists ==
- Brad Paisley
- Keith Urban
- Tim McGraw
- Faith Hill
- Little Big Town
- Luke Bryan
- Miranda Lambert
- Blake Shelton
- George Strait
- Eric Church
- Dierks Bentley
- Lady A
- Martina McBride
- Darius Rucker
- Jason Aldean
- Rascal Flatts
- Brooks & Dunn
- Alan Jackson
- Carrie Underwood
- Toby Keith
- The (Dixie) Chicks
- Taylor Swift
- Kenny Chesney
- Florida Georgia Line
- Sugarland
- Chris Stapleton
- Zac Brown Band
- Montgomery Gentry
- The Band Perry
