= Maximum Exposure =

American reality television series

- Also known as: Max X
- Genre: Reality television Clip show
- Written by: Aaron Kass; Steve Lavapies; Sean Abley; Andrew Robbins; Michael Bailey
- Narrated by: Cam Brainard
- Theme music composer: Mike Greene
- Opening theme: "Maximum Exposure"
- Ending theme: "Maximum Exposure"
- Country of origin: United States
- Original language: English
- No. of seasons: 2
- No. of episodes: 52

Production
- Executive producers: Mack Anderson; Bradley Anderson
- Running time: 40–42 minutes
- Production companies: Paramount Domestic Television; RTV News Inc. First Television

Original release
- Network: Syndicated
- Release: October 7, 2000 – May 25, 2002

Maximum Exposure (also known as Max X) is an American reality television series showcasing video clips on a variety of subjects. It ran from October 7, 2000 until May 25, 2002. The program features shocking, humorous, and often dangerous real-life moments captured on camera. As its various slogans attest, the show was targeted at teens and young adults.

The program also showed videos from other reality shows, especially its predecessor Real TV, and was noted both for its fast-paced action and its analysis of slow-motion replays.

== Outline ==
The executive producers were brothers Mack and Bradley Anderson of First Television. Cam Brainard (better known as the narrator of This Week in Baseball and the announcer for Disney Channel) narrated the show, while credited as the "Smart-Aleck Announcer Dude." Each episode was an hour long and aired in syndication from 2000 to 2002, with reruns until 2004. The show was produced by Paramount Domestic Television and RTV News.

== Syndication ==
At one point, it was re-aired on Spike TV from 2005 to 2008, and the Fox Reality Channel from 2005 to 2008. Also, reruns aired on WGN America and in some syndication markets. In India, Maximum Exposure is currently being aired on Spark Big CBS Channel. In Estonia, it was titled Meeletu Maailm (Maximum Exposure) and is currently being aired on TV6. In Australia, the program aired on FOX8 from 2006 to 2007, and reruns are still aired from time to time. While in Malaysia, the show had previously been aired on TV2 from 2002 to 2003. In 2006, the show aired on ABC-5 (now TV5) in the Philippines that was given the own local name titled Todo Max and was hosted by Gladys Guevarra with the narrators/co-hosts Nicole Hyala and Chris Tsuper of Love Radio. On AXN Asia, where the series was formerly aired, only 13 episodes in both Seasons 1 and 2 were broadcast, while the remaining episodes from both seasons was not aired due to censorship on immature content which was not suitable for young viewers.

== Running gags ==
Max X had a series of running gags throughout the duration of the show.

- Dudes: Most males on the show's videos are referred to as "dudes."
- The La-dies: Brainard is usually heard ogling at attractive women which he refers to as "la-dies."
- "Sweet" mullets: Brainard takes the time in videos to point out and make fun of people with mullets.
- "Oh yeah!": One of Brainard's favorite sayings.
- Use of Telestrator: Brainard often uses a yellow colored telestrator to highlight certain parts of videos. He often uses this to point out sweet mullets.
- "Good eatin'": Usually used in conjunction with animal videos. As in, "Remember, them monkeys is good eatin'" or "Hyenas say dik-dik is good eatin'."
- Double negatives: Quite common on the show and used for comedic effect, such as, "In Bizarro world, cops don't shoot nobody."
- Cigarettes: Brainard usually points out people's inability to let go of their cigarette when either they or someone else is in grave danger.
- Stereotypes: Max X routinely makes fun of foreigners, including the French, the Russians, and the Canadians, especially those who are intoxicated. Running gags include how "dirty" France is and how "boring" Canada is.
- Variable Speed: When a clip is replayed, a menu comes up on the left hand side of the screen with the Variable Speed controls. Brainard usually says something like, "Let's see that again," prompting the menu. The choices include Slo-Mo, Frame by Frame, Super Slo-Mo, High Speed, and Replay.
- Image Enhancement: similar to the "Variable Speed" menu, but with features to detail the replay of a clip. The choices are Zoom, Enlarge, Extreme Close-Up, Highlight (Isolation), Night Vision, Thermal Vision, Color Enhancement, and Resolution.
- Camera Angle: similar to the "Variable Speed" menu, but with different angles of the replay of the clip if it was filmed on multiple cameras.
- Max X List: The top clips (usually three to five) for each episode are counted down at the end of the episode as the Max X List.
- Yellow Arrows: Yellows arrows appear suddenly around limbs that are broken in multiple places. Each arrow appearance is accompanied with a very quick cow bell sound effect.

== Episodes ==
Each episode of the 52 produced for the series had a particular theme:

=== Season 1 (2000–2001) ===
No.	Title	Original release date	Prod. code
1	"That's Gotta Hurt!"	October 7, 2000	001
2	"Extreme Sports Psychos"	October 14, 2000	005
3	"Nasty, Nasty Critters"	October 21, 2000	007
4	"I Fought The Law"	October 28, 2000	008
5	"Earth: The World's Most Dangerous Planet! (Note: Episodes which have different background music in the ending credits.)"	November 4, 2000	003
6	"Extremely Lucky Dudes"	November 11, 2000	004
7	"Animals Strike Back"	November 18, 2000	002
8	"It Coulda Been Worse!"	November 25, 2000	006
9	"Wipeouts!"	December 2, 2000	009
10	"Rescue Me!"	December 23, 2000	011
11	"Greatest Hits"	December 30, 2000	012
12	"Comin' to Getcha!"	January 20, 2001	013
13	"Bizarro World"	January 27, 2001	015
14	"When People Attack"	February 3, 2001	014
15	"The Coolest Animals Alive"	February 10, 2001	017
16	"Believe It... Or Don't"	February 17, 2001	010
17	"The World's Most Dumbest Guys"	February 24, 2001	016
18	"Goin For It!"	March 3, 2001	018
19	"So You Think Your Job Sucks?!"	March 24, 2001	023
20	"Max X Awards"	April 14, 2001	025
21	"Max X Guide to Life"	April 21, 2001	024
22	"Real Fight Club"	April 28, 2001	019
23	"International Edition"	May 5, 2001	020
24	"Awesome Explosions"	May 12, 2001	044
25	"Like, Totally Over-Exposed"	May 19, 2001	022
26	"Twisted TV!"	May 26, 2001	026

=== Season 2 (2001–2002) ===
Note: 15 out of 26 episodes of the series' second season was aired between January and May 2002, however the copyright year is written as 2001 instead of 2002. This is maybe due to its production year.

No.	Title	Original release date	Prod. code
27	"Really, Really Bad Days"	October 5, 2001	027
28	"On the Edge"	October 12, 2001	028
29	"Talent Show"	October 19, 2001	021
30	"Holy Matrimony: The World's Weirdest Wedding Videos"	October 27, 2001	040
31	"Stupid Morons: A Celebration of Life"	November 2, 2001	029
32	"Guns and Hoses: Shocking Stories from the Street"	November 9, 2001	033
33	"Too Drunk For TV"	November 16, 2001	032
34	"Critter 911"	November 23, 2001	034
35	"Wonderful World"	November 30, 2001	030
36	"The Max X Commandments"	December 21, 2001	047
37	"Born To Lose"	December 28, 2001	041
38	"Super Heroes"	January 12, 2002	031
39	"Pain Fest"	January 26, 2002	035
40	"Bad Dudes With 'Tudes"	February 2, 2002	048
41	"Hell on Earth"	February 9, 2002	049
42	"The Beat Goes On: Shocking Police Action"	February 16, 2002	051
43	"3,147,568,279 Women Can't Be Wrong... Men Are Stupid"	February 23, 2002	038
44	"Max X How To Show"	March 2, 2002	050
45	"Special Moments, Special People"	March 23, 2002	036
46	"Recipe for Disaster"	April 6, 2002	043
47	"The Future of America"	April 20, 2002	037
48	"Wild in the Streets"	April 27, 2002	039
49	"Crash! Bam! Boom!"	May 4, 2002	042
50	"Them Friggin' Critters"	May 11, 2002	045
51	"Dudes in Uniform"	May 18, 2002	046
52	"Max X Coolest, Most Awesom-est Videos! You're Ever Gonna See in the 21st Century"	May 25, 2002	052

== See also ==
- Real TV
