= The Barker Family Band =

EP by The Barker Family Band with Sara Evans
- Released: April 12, 2019
- Genre: Country
- Length: 19:07
- Label: Born to Fly

Sara Evans and the Barker Family Band chronology
| The Barker Family Band (2019) | Live from City Winery Nashville (2019) |

Sara Evans chronology
| Words (2017) | The Barker Family Band (2019) | Live from City Winery Nashville (2019) |

The Barker Family Band is an extended play released by American country artist Sara Evans. On the release, Evans collaborates and shares credit with members of her family, titling themselves Barker Family Band. It was released April 12, 2019 on the independent label, Born to Fly Records. It was Evans's first collaborative project to feature her three children. The release also features background music from Evans's siblings.

== Background and content ==
According to Evans, the project was not unnatural. Her children had grown up watching her perform in concert and traveled with her on tour. "When you grow up around it, it’s just totally second nature, It’s really second nature for them to be onstage, to be on the road. They totally understand touring life, Evans recalled. Evans thought of the idea while on her tour bus and proposed it to her manager, who also liked the idea.

The extended play consists of six tracks, five of which were previously not recorded by Evans. The project featured Evans's daughter Olivia on lead vocals and her son Avery on guitar. The record contains cover version of previously recorded song from different musical styles. Among its tracks is a cover of "Dreams" by Fleetwood Mac. The song was one that the family had been playing live many times and was among their favorites to perform. Also included is a remake of Evans's 2001 hit "Born to Fly".

== Promotion and reception ==
To promote the extended play, the family embarked on The Bloodline Tour, which ran through the spring of 2019. The tours were exclusively held in each location at the City Winery chains. Before its official release, the track "Dreams" was released to promote the record. The song premiered on the website for People Magazine. The song also appeared on rotation on the Sirius XM Y2Kountry satellite channel.

The EP has since been reviewed by music journalists. Jeffrey Remz of Country Standard Time saw the Barker Family Band in concert and commented on the EP's material. "Give a heavy dose of credit for Evans for taking on one-off side project that clearly is fun for her and family, but more importantly delivers musically. There's something to be said for coming around again."

== Track listing ==
The Barker Family Band
| No. | Title | Writer(s) | Original Artist | Length |
|---|---|---|---|---|
| 1. | "Born to Fly Intro" | Sara Evans; Marcus Hummon; Darrell Scott | Sara Evans | 0:36 |
| 2. | "Dreams" | Stevie Nicks | Fleetwood Mac | 4:19 |
| 3. | "XO" | Ryan Tedder; Terius Nash; Beyoncé Knowles | Beyoncé | 3:27 |
| 4. | "(You Make Me Feel Like) a Natural Woman" | Gerry Goffin; Carole King; Jerry Wexler | Aretha Franklin | 3:02 |
| 5. | "The View" | Avery Barker; Olivia Barker | Sara Evans and the Barker Family Band | 4:00 |
| 6. | "Somewhere Over the Rainbow" | Harold Arlen; Yip Harburg | Judy Garland | 3:43 |

== Release history ==
| Region | Date | Format | Label | Ref. |
|---|---|---|---|---|
| United States | April 12, 2019 | digital download | Born to Fly | |
