= Real TV =

- Real TV title card from 1997–1999
- Genre: Reality television; Clip show
- Presented by: John Daly (1996–2000); Kristen Eykel (1999–2000); Ahmad Rashad (2000–2001)
- Voices of: Beau Weaver (announcer 1996–1999; 2000–2001); Mitch Lewis (announcer 1999–2000); Jim Pratt (announcer 2000–2001)
- Narrated by: J.J. Johnson (2000–2001)
- Theme music composer: Planet One Music Productions
- Country of origin: United States
- Original language: English
- No. of seasons: 5

Production
- Production locations: Mesa, Arizona (1996–1997) Hollywood, California: Hollywood Center Studios (1997–2001)
- Running time: 30 minutes
- Production companies: RTV News Inc. (1999-2001) (seasons 4-5); Paramount Domestic Television

Original release
- Network: Syndication
- Release: September 9, 1996 – September 7, 2001

Real TV (commonly known as America's Best Caught on Tape) is an American reality television program that ran in syndication from September 9, 1996, to September 7, 2001. It aired footage of extraordinary events that were not usually covered in mainstream news.

== Hosts ==
The show was hosted by John Daly from the show's inception in 1996 through 2000, with Beau Weaver announcing until 1999. During Daly's run, the series was presented in the style of a newsmagazine, with show correspondents reporting further surrounding information and profiles beyond the video clips. Featured correspondents included Sibila Vargas, Michael Brownlee, John Johnston, Lisa G., and Ellen K. William B. Davis, best known as Cigarette Smoking Man from the sci-fi TV series The X-Files, also made occasional appearances.

In season 4 of the show, he was joined by Kristen Eykel, and Mitch Lewis became the announcer.

When Daly and Eykel left, Ahmad Rashad took over for them until the show's end. Rashad's version of Real TV had a new set, introduction, and announcer. It also became more of a generic video presentation show without surrounding correspondents, and any extra profiles on the subjects done by off-camera producers. It also targeted towards younger viewers, featuring more extreme sports footage, and less focus on human interest stories and celebrities. The show was cancelled in 2001 and while most markets aired reruns until September 6, 2002, some replaced it with the weekly series Maximum Exposure (which was produced under the RTV News banner).

== Syndication ==
After the original run concluded in 2001, TNN (now Paramount Network) aired reruns of the last two seasons of Real TV until 2003. In summer 2003, TNN began showing reruns of the first three seasons before rebranding to Spike TV. Shortly after, the final two seasons were removed from the schedule. By 2006, Spike TV eliminated Real TV reruns entirely. From 2005, at least the first two seasons were broadcast on Fox Reality Channel until early 2008, when they were also removed. Additionally, reruns aired on WGN America (now NewsNation) in the late 2000s.

== See also ==
- Maximum Exposure
- World's Most Amazing Videos
