= John Daly (American media personality, born 1955) =

American media personality

- Born: November 16, 1955 (age 70); Hartford, Connecticut, United States
- Education: Providence College
- Occupations: Journalist, news anchor TV Host, Author

John Daly is an American media personality.

== Journalism ==
A graduate of Providence College, Daly worked for the Norwich Bulletin, WCTI-TV in New Bern, North Carolina, WPRI-TV in Providence, Rhode Island, and WFSB-TV in Hartford, Connecticut before becoming the main anchor, then newsroom managing editor for KTNV-13 in Las Vegas in 1990. From 1996 until 2000, Daly hosted Real TV, a nationally syndicated program. He also was the host of House Detective on the HGTV cable network and of a web based show for entrepreneurs called Real Money Show which also appeared on TV4U.Com and KSHOTV.Com.

In 2011, Daly joined New England Cable News as the network's primetime co-anchor. In 2017, Daly was inducted into the Nevada Broadcasters Hall of Fame.

== Business ==
From 2007 to 2009 Daly was the vice president of business development for BNY Mellon Wealth Management for Southern Nevada. He then served as the vice president of broadcast operations for the World Series of Golf.
