= Sonic the Hedgehog (TV series) =

1993–1994 American animated television series

- Also known as: Sonic SatAM
- Genre: Action-adventure; Science fantasy; Comedy drama
- Based on: Sonic the Hedgehog by: Yuji Naka; Naoto Ohshima; Hirokazu Yasuhara
- Directed by: John Grusd (pilot only); Dick Sebast (season 1); Ron Myrick (season 2); Ginny McSwain (voice)
- Voices of: Jaleel White; Charlie Adler; Mark Ballou (season 1); Cam Brainard (season 2); Christine Cavanaugh; Jim Cummings; Rob Paulsen; Bradley Pierce; Kath Soucie; Cree Summer; Frank Welker; William Windom
- Theme music composer: Noisy Neighbors; Michael Tavera
- Opening theme: "The Fastest Thing Alive"
- Composers: Michael Tavera (season 1); Matt Muhoberac (season 2); John Zuker (season 2)
- Countries of origin: Italy; United States
- Original language: English
- No. of seasons: 2
- No. of episodes: 26 (28 segments) (Note: Most episodes (24) are 22-minute full-length segments; season two's "Fed Up with Antoine / Ghost Busted" and "The Odd Couple / Ro-Becca" are each split into two 11-minute segments.)

Production
- Executive producers: Andy Heyward; Robby London
- Producers: John Grusd (pilot only); Dick Sebast (season 1); Ron Myrick (season 2)
- Editors: Mark A. McNally; Sue Odjakjian; CK Horness
- Running time: 22 minutes
- Production companies: DIC Productions, L.P. (Note: Known as DIC Animation City during season 1. Produced in association with Saerom Animation); Sega of America; Reteitalia S.p.A

Original release
- Network: ABC
- Release: September 18, 1993 – December 3, 1994

Related
- Adventures of Sonic the Hedgehog; Sonic Underground; Sonic X; Sonic Boom; Sonic Prime

Sonic the Hedgehog is an animated television series based on Sega's Sonic the Hedgehog video game franchise. It aired for two seasons with a total of 26 episodes on ABC from September 18, 1993, to December 3, 1994. It was produced by DIC Productions, Sega of America, and the Italian studio Reteitalia in association with Telecinco. It is the second of DIC's Sonic animated Sonic series, after Adventures of Sonic the Hedgehog and before Sonic Underground. To distinguish it from Adventures and other Sonic media, fans commonly refer to the series as "Sonic SatAM", in reference to its Saturday morning timeslot.

Compared to Adventures, the show features a darker and more dramatic tone. It depicts Sonic the Hedgehog, Sally Acorn, and their team of Freedom Fighters battling to overthrow Dr. Robotnik, who has already conquered their home planet, Mobius and rules over it as a polluted industrial dystopia.

Despite its cancellation, the series has become a cult classic. Some original characters of the series later appeared in the video games Sonic Spinball and Sonic-16 that was cancelled after the release of Spinball. The show also inspired the long-running Sonic the Hedgehog comic book series by Archie Comics.

== Plot ==
Mad scientist Dr. Julian Robotnik rules as dictator over the planet Mobius, having overthrown the city of Mobotropolis with his fleet of military robots, and converted it into a polluted industrial cityscape (Robotropolis), transforming nearly all of its animal citizens into robotic slaves using his Roboticizer machine.

From the hidden woodland village of Knothole, Sonic the Hedgehog and Princess Sally Acorn lead a team of Freedom Fighters in a rebellion against Robotnik's regime. Other group members include Sonic's best friend Tails, scientist Rotor the Walrus, Antoine Depardieu the Coyote, and half-roboticized Bunnie Rabbot.

During the series, the heroes fight against Swat-Bots commanded by Robotnik and his resentful nephew Snively. Sonic collects Power Rings that temporarily boost his power, and uses them to restore free will to his roboticized Uncle Chuck, inventor of both the rings and the Roboticizer. Chuck acts as a spy among Robotnik's ranks. They find Sally's father King Acorn, who is imprisoned within the Void, alongside the evil sorcerer Ixis Naugus. They gain new allies including Dulcy the Dragon, Ari the Ram, and Lupe, leader of the elusive Wolf Pack.

In the series finale, "The Doomsday Project", Robotnik builds a Doomsday Machine to annihilate all organic life on Mobius. The Freedom Fighters launch a full-scale counterattack, and Sonic and Sally use the Deep Power Stones to destroy his machine. Robotnik disappears amid the wreckage. The Freedom Fighters declare victory, with Sonic and Sally kissing. In a final scene, Snively survives and is accompanied by an unseen ally with red eyes, stated by writer Ben Hurst to be the evil sorcerer Naugus, who would have become the main antagonist if a third season was produced while having enslaved Dr. Robotnik and King Acorn.

== Characters ==
Promotional artwork. Clockwise: Doctor Robotnik, Snively, Tails, Bunnie, Antoine, Sonic, Sally, Rotor, a Swat-Bot, and Cluck.

=== Main ===
- Sonic the Hedgehog (voiced by Jaleel White as his older self, Tahj Mowry as his younger self) is a blue hedgehog and the main protagonist of the series. He is able to run at superhuman speed, and is the only Freedom Fighter capable of using magical rings called Power Rings. Sonic has an impatient and head-strong personality, but is also fearless, heroic, and well-meaning. He always mockingly refers to Robotnik as "Ro-butt-nik".
- Princess Sally Alicia Acorn (voiced by Kath Soucie as her older self, Lindsay Ridgeway as her younger self) is a chipmunk who is the rightful princess of Mobotropolis and Sonic's love interest. As strategist and leader of the Knothole Freedom Fighters, she is knowledgeable and the voice of reason. Sally tries to keep Sonic grounded. She is known for her compassion and master diplomacy.
- Bunnie Rabbot (voiced by Christine Cavanaugh) is a Southern-accented rabbit. Half of her body was roboticized, leaving her left arm and both legs mechanical. She is skilled in martial arts and wants to be returned to normal.
- Antoine "Ant" Depardieu (voiced by Rob Paulsen as his older self, Katie Leigh as his younger self) is a French-accented coyote whose awkwardness often places the others in danger and gets him captured. He has some difficulty speaking English. He has romantic feelings for Princess Sally, and attempts to impress her. However, his selfishness hinders this goal. Sonic often teases Antoine over his shortcomings.
- Rotor (voiced by Mark Ballou in Season 1, Cam Brainard in Season 2) is a walrus and the mechanic of Knothole Village. He provides the Knothole Freedom Fighters with useful inventions, and accompanies them on infiltrations.
- Tails (voiced by Bradley Pierce) is a young two-tailed fox who idolizes Sonic. While usually left behind in Knothole, he proves useful in deadly missions.
- Nicole (voiced by Kath Soucie) is a portable computer that Sally uses to hack into Robotnik's technology. Nicole speaks in a female monotone, and exhibits artificial intelligence. It is indicated that Sally received Nicole from her father.
- Dulcy (voiced by Cree Summer) is a young dragon who provides the Knothole Freedom Fighters with transportation. Sporting powerful lungs, Dulcy can blow enemies away and burn/freeze them with fire or ice breath. She has trouble landing, and often crashes mid-flight.

=== Villains ===
- Dr. Julian Robotnik (voiced by Jim Cummings) is an evil human warlord who seeks to cover Mobius in machinery and transform its population into robotic slaves by roboticizing them. He is chiefly opposed by the Knothole Freedom Fighters. Robotnik's obsession with destroying Sonic is often his downfall. In this version, his real first name is Julian, adopting the moniker "Robotnik" after his takeover.
  - Snively (voiced by Charlie Adler) is Robotnik's nephew and assistant. He is frequently abused by his uncle. As such, Snively hates Robotnik and plots behind his back.
  - Cluck (vocal effects by Frank Welker) is a robotic chicken-like bird and the only creature Robotnik shows affection towards.
  - Swat-Bots (voiced by Jim Cummings and Frank Welker) are Robotnik's primary henchmen and foot soldiers.
- The Nasty Hyenas are a biker gang of cannibalistic hyenas that ride on hoverbikes. They consist of three unnamed male members (voiced by Dorian Harewood, John Kassir, and Jim Cummings) and one female member (voiced by Alaina Reed Hall). The Nasty Hyenas are known to find people lead them and then eat them.
- Ixis Naugus (voiced by Michael Bell) is a powerful humanoid hybrid sorcerer with a chimpanzee-like muzzle, bat-like ears, a rhinoceros horn, a lobster-like claw for a left hand, and a lizard-like tail. He resents his former associate Robotnik for betraying and imprisoning him within the Void. Naugus desires retribution, but he cannot escape without turning into crystal due to him being in the Void for too long as he can no longer exist outside the void. He has mastered holding off the Void's effects in the center of the Void.

=== Supporting ===
- Sir Charles "Chuck" Hedgehog (voiced by William Windom) is Sonic's uncle, and the inventor of the Roboticizer before Robotnik stole it. He was roboticized and made into one of Robotnik's slaves, until Sonic restored his free will with a De-Roboticizer prototype. He serves as a spy for the Freedom Fighters. According to Robby London, he was named after the writer and animator Chuck Menville who died in 1992.
- Ari Ram (voiced by Victor Love) is a Freedom Fighter who worked as a double agent for Robotnik, only to be betrayed later and trapped in the Void. He is later rescued by Sonic and joins the Knothole Freedom Fighters.
- King Acorn (voiced by Tim Curry) is the former king of Mobotropolis and Sally's father. He was banished to the Void during Robotnik's takeover, and like Naugus, cannot escape without turning into crystal due to prolonged exposure to the Void. Before returning to the Void, he gives Sally the list of all the Freedom Fighter groups in Mobius, telling her to find them, unify them under her banner and establish a Freedom Fighter network so they can be strong enough to overthrow Robotnik once and for all.
- Lupe Wolf (voiced by Shari Belafonte) – Leader of the Wolfpack Freedom Fighters and one of the Knothole Freedom Fighters' allies in the fight against Robotnik.

== Voice cast ==
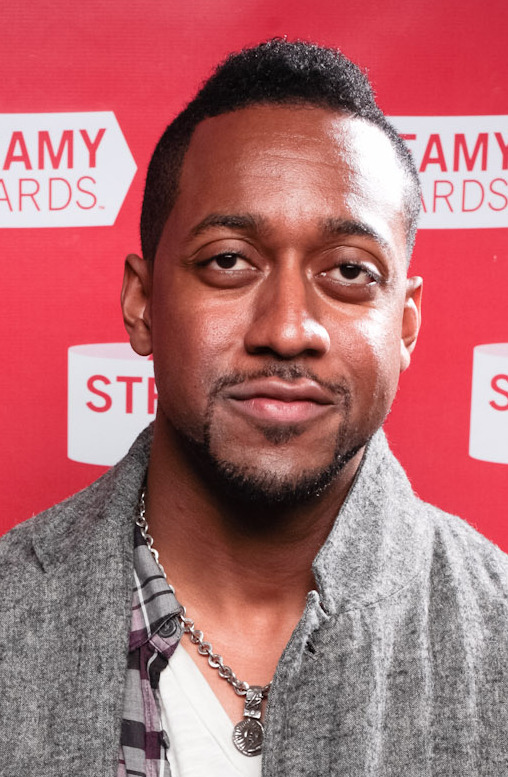
Jaleel White reprised his role as Sonic from Adventures of Sonic the Hedgehog.

- Jaleel White as Sonic the Hedgehog
- Charlie Adler as Snively
- Mark Ballou as Rotor Walrus (Season 1)
- Cam Brainard as Rotor Walrus (Season 2)
- Christine Cavanaugh as Bunnie Rabbot
- Jim Cummings as Dr. Julian Robotnik, Swat-Bots, Nasty Hyena #3 (in "Fed Up With Antoine"), additional voices
- Rob Paulsen as Antoine Depardieu
- Bradley Pierce as Miles "Tails" Prower
- Kath Soucie as Princess Sally Acorn, Nicole
- Cree Summer as Dulcy the Dragon
- Frank Welker as Cluck, Swat-Bots, Kraken (in "Sub-Sonic"), Terapods (in "Sonic Past Cool"), Muttski (in "Heads or Tails"), additional voices
- William Windom as Uncle Chuck

=== Additional voices ===
- Shari Belafonte as Lupe Wolf (in "Cry of the Wolf", "The Doomsday Project")
- Michael Bell as Ixis Naugus (in "The Void")
- Crystal Cooke as Additional voices
- Tim Curry as King Acorn (in "Blast to the Past" Pt. 1, "Blast to the Past" Pt. 2, "The Void" and "Drood Henge"), Keeper of the Time Stones (in "Blast to the Past" Pt. 1)
- David Doyle as Cat (in "Sonic Boom"), Additional voices
- Dave Fennoy as Additional voices
- Ed Gilbert as Guardian / Lazar (uncredited)
- Alaina Reed Hall as Female Nasty Hyena (in "Fed Up With Antoine")
- Dorian Harewood as Nasty Hyena #1 (in "Fed Up With Antoine"), additional voices
- Gaile Heidemann as Mama T's translator voice (in "Sonic Past Cool"), Additional voices
- Dana Hill as Baby T's translator voice (in "Sonic Past Cool")
- John Kassir as Nasty Hyena #2 (in "Fed Up With Antoine"), Additional voices
- Katie Leigh as Young Antoine (in "Blast to the Past" Pt. 1), Additional voices
- Nancy Linari as Sabina (in "Blast to the Past" Pt. 2), Mother Dragon (in "Dulcy"), Additional voices
- Victor Love as Ari Ram (in "Game Guy", "The Void", "The Doomsday Project"), Additional voices
- Danny Mann as Alien-Bot #3
- Jason Marsden as Dirk (in "Warp Sonic"), Additional voices
- Tahj Mowry as Young Sonic (in "Blast to the Past" Pt. 1, "Blast to the Past" Pt. 2)
- Hal Rayle as Wolf Pack Soldier (in "Cry of the Wolf"), Additional voices
- Lindsay Ridgeway as Young Princess Sally (in "Blast to the Past" Pt. 1, "Blast to the Past" Pt. 2)
- Charlie Schlatter as Griff (in "Warp Sonic")
- April Winchell as Rosie (in "Blast to the Past" Pt. 2), Ro-Becca (in "Ro-Becca"), additional voices

== Production ==
Sonic the Hedgehog was created by DiC Animation City in association with Sega of America, which produced a total of 26 episodes for its two-season run, and the Italian studio Reteitalia S.p.A., part of Fininvest company in association with Telecinco. The show's animation was outsourced to the Korean studio Sae Rom Production and Spanish studio Milimetros. Pre-production stages of the show's first season (as well as the weekday syndicated show Adventures of Sonic the Hedgehog) were handled by Canadian Studio B (later known as DHX Media Vancouver).

Before production began, Sega of America CEO Tom Kalinske and its newly appointed consumer products director Michealene Risley approached DiC Entertainment's CEO Andy Heyward and the ABC network to produce a television show featuring Sonic. After being shown the character, Heyward agreed to make the show and was granted the license. According to Robby London, DiC originally made a deal to produce only the Saturday morning Sonic series for the ABC network, which was originally planned to air in the Fall of 1992, coinciding with the release of Sonic the Hedgehog 2, as well as the original Sonic the Hedgehog 4-issue miniseries by Archie Comics. The cartoon was to be more light-hearted compared to the final product, as reflected by the episode "Heads or Tails", early promotional material found in Fleetway's Sonic the Comic and the early issues of Sonic the Hedgehog comics by Archie, which were based on the Saturday morning Sonic cartoon. However, DiC also wanted to expand the show and produce additional episodes for weekday syndication as well, similar to what DiC had previously done with The Real Ghostbusters, but Mark Pedowitz, the then-senior vice president of business affairs and contracts at ABC, who expected the Sonic cartoon to air exclusively on ABC, rejected the idea, telling London "If you guys want to do syndication, be our guest, go with God, but you won't be on our network."

ABC would not agree to the deal until London came with a proposition that DiC would produce a separate, vastly different Sonic show for syndication instead, the result of which became Adventures of Sonic the Hedgehog. Afterwards, ABC was at first willing to air only a single half-hour episode as a prime-time special scheduled to air in March 1993 (which would become the episode "Heads or Tails") before ultimately delaying it and including it as part of the show which ABC picked up again for a full season, finally airing in the Fall of 1993, alongside Adventures airing in syndication at the same time. After the decision was made to split the show into two different ones, the Saturday morning Sonic cartoon was made darker and more serious in order to distinguish itself from the syndicated Sonic cartoon, which was deliberately made bright, light-hearted and homaging the style, humor and spirit of the classic American theatrical shorts from the golden age of animation, like Looney Tunes, Tom and Jerry, Popeye and Betty Boop. The show bible for the Saturday morning Sonic cartoon was written in February 1992 with the final revision made on March 10, 1993.

== Episodes ==
=== Series overview ===
| Season | Segments | Episodes | Originally released | |
| Season | Segments | Episodes | First released | Last released |
|---|---|---|---|---|
| 1 | 13 | 13 | September 18, 1993 | December 11, 1993 |
| 2 | 15 | 13 | September 24, 1994 | December 3, 1994 |

=== Season 1 (1993) ===
| No. overall | No. in season | Title | Written by | Original release date | Prod. code |
|---|---|---|---|---|---|
| 1 | 1 | "Super Sonic" | Jules Dennis | September 18, 1993 | 238-205 |
An ancient, formerly evil wizard named Lazar takes away Sonic's speed, with the promise to return it if Sonic retrieves the wizard's computer archive of spells from Robotnik.
| 2 | 2 | "Sonic Boom" | Len Janson | September 25, 1993 | 238-201 |
Princess Sally and Antoine follow up on a lead that suggests that her father, King Acorn, may be alive. Meanwhile, Sonic attempts to rescue a captured Freedom Fighter.
| 3 | 3 | "Sonic and Sally" | Ben Hurst & Pat Allee | October 2, 1993 | 238-202 |
When the Princess is captured, Robotnik creates a robotic duplicate of her as a means of spying on and sabotaging the Freedom Fighters.
| 4 | 4 | "Hooked on Sonics" | Randy Rogel | October 9, 1993 | 238-207 |
Antoine goes after Robotnik himself in an attempt to impress Sally and earn personal glory.
| 5 | 5 | "Ultra Sonic" | David Villaire | October 16, 1993 | 238-203 |
Sonic finds his long-lost uncle, Sir Charles, after a failed mission in Robotropolis.
| 6 | 6 | "Sonic's Nightmare" | Frank Santopadre | October 23, 1993 | 238-209 |
Sonic is paralyzed by a recurring nightmare personifying his own personal fears; meanwhile, Robotnik unleashes a machine capable of destroying the world.
| 7 | 7 | "Warp Sonic" | Matt Uitz | October 30, 1993 | 238-210 |
The Freedom Fighters find themselves defending an underground city of Mobian refugees, all the while coming to terms with their own personal relationships.
| 8 | 8 | "Harmonic Sonic" | David Villaire | November 6, 1993 | 238-208 |
Robotnik launches a spy satellite in an effort to locate Knothole Village, the Freedom Fighters' hidden base. Sonic and Rotor head towards the satellite using a makeshift rocket to destroy it.
| 9 | 9 | "Sonic and the Secret Scrolls" | Janis Diamond | November 13, 1993 | 238-204 |
The Freedom Fighters embark on a mission to find magical scrolls which may hold the key to unlimited power.
| 10 | 10 | "Sub-Sonic" | Barbara Slade | November 20, 1993 | 238-211 |
The Freedom Fighters' home, the Great Forest, is dying. In search of magical water that causes plants to grow at an accelerated speed, the Freedom Fighters journey underground where they begin disappearing one by one.
| 11 | 11 | "Heads or Tails" | Len Janson | November 27, 1993 | 238-213 |
Sonic heads to Robotropolis in search of materials to build a defense against an impending invasion by Robotnik. However, the inexperienced Tails is tagging along.
| 12 | 12 | "Sonic Past Cool" | Kayte Kuch & Sheryl Scarborough | December 4, 1993 | 238-212 |
Robotnik has set his eyes on the last living herd of a dinosaur-like species called Terapods. The Freedom Fighters help the creatures navigate through the Great Jungle where Sally has Nicole make use of translators for two Terapods while fighting off the advances of Robotnik's machines.
| 13 | 13 | "Sonic Racer" | Len Janson | December 11, 1993 | 238-206 |
Robotnik holds a race in Robotropolis in a bid to lure Sonic into a trap. The other Freedom Fighters take advantage of Robotnik's fixation on the race in hopes of destroying the city's power generator.

=== Season 2 (1994) ===
| No. overall | No. in season | Title | Written by | Original release date | Prod. code |
|---|---|---|---|---|---|
| 14 | 1 | "Game Guy" | Ben Hurst & Pat Allee | September 10, 1994 | 238-302 |
Sonic and Sally befriend an ally named Ari Ram who claims to be part of another Freedom Fighter group, but he is not what he seems to be.
| 15 | 2 | "Sonic Conversion" | Ben Hurst & Pat Allee | September 17, 1994 | 238-301 |
Knothole's de-roboticizer is a success! Bunnie Rabbot and Uncle Chuck are back to their normal selves! But the Freedom Fighters' latest accomplishment seems too good to be true.
| 16 | 3 | "No Brainer" | Pat Allee | September 24, 1994 | 238-303 |
When Sonic loses his memory, Snively takes advantage and gets the hedgehog to infiltrate Knothole.
| 17 | 4 | "Blast to the Past" | Ben Hurst | October 1, 1994 | 238-304 |
| 18 | 5 | "Blast to the Past" | Ben Hurst | October 8, 1994 | 238-305 |
Part I: The war with Robotnik is going badly. The only hope may lie in a pair of magical Time Stones: using them, Sonic and Sally could travel to Mobotropolis Kingdom's past (prior to Robotnik's takeover) and stop the fight before it begins. Part II: The time-travel mission to stop Robotnik has failed; his armies have already taken Mobotropolis! Also, Sonic and Sally have somehow put their younger selves and the Knothole Village in the Great Forest at risk.
| 19a | 6a | "Fed Up with Antoine" | Len Janson | October 15, 1994 | 238-306a |
Antoine is appointed king of a biker gang called the Nasty Hyenas, unaware of their cannibalistic tradition.
| 19b | 6b | "Ghost Busted" | Pat Allee | October 15, 1994 | 238-306b |
Sonic and Tails investigate a possible ghost problem while camping out with Antoine.
| 20 | 7 | "Dulcy" | Ben Hurst & Pat Allee | October 22, 1994 | 238-307 |
Dulcy is summoned to a dragon mating ground as Robotnik seeks to Roboticize the remainder of her species.
| 21 | 8 | "The Void" | Ben Hurst | October 29, 1994 | 238-308 |
When Sally and Bunnie disappear, Sonic and Nicole rush in to rescue them, discovering the Void. Within the Void, they encounter a mysterious wizard named Naugus, the long-lost friend Ari, as well as Sally's father, the long-lost king of Mobotropolis.
| 22a | 9a | "The Odd Couple" | Len Janson | November 5, 1994 | 238-309a |
Antoine is forced to share his house with Sonic after a failed landing from Dulcy destroys the hedgehog's home.
| 22b | 9b | "Ro-Becca" | Pat Allee | November 5, 1994 | 238-309b |
Antoine accidentally activates a robot Rotor was working on. The robot suddenly develops a crush on him.
| 23 | 10 | "Cry of the Wolf" | Pat Allee | November 12, 1994 | 238-310 |
Sonic and company finally make contact with another Royal Freedom Fighter group. They must work together when a nearly indestructible war-machine arrives to attack.
| 24 | 11 | "Drood Henge" | Ben Hurst | November 19, 1994 | 238-311 |
Sonic and Tails team up in order to thwart Robotnik's scheme to possess the magical Deep Power Stones.
| 25 | 12 | "Spyhog" | Ben Hurst | November 26, 1994 | 238-312 |
Uncle Chuck finds himself increasingly at risk operating as a spy in Robotropolis.
| 26 | 13 | "The Doomsday Project" | Ben Hurst | December 3, 1994 | 238-313 |
Robotnik's Doomsday Project begins a week earlier than anyone had anticipated. With all of Mobius in danger, the Freedom Fighters prepare for what may be their final battle.

== Broadcast and distribution ==
=== Initial run ===
The Saturday morning series differs from Adventures of Sonic the Hedgehog, which premiered two weeks earlier and aired on weekdays in syndication. While Adventures is lighthearted and comical, Sonic the Hedgehog featured a comparatively complex plot and dramatic atmosphere. It explored unusual story concepts for animation, including losing loved ones to war and relationships focusing on young couples.

While featuring a darker tone in comparison to Adventures, the Saturday morning show's first season had an episodic structure and aired out of order, however the second season featured a story arc (which would've continued in the later seasons, had the show not been cancelled). At ABC's request, the second season included episodes devoted to humor, while darker and dramatic elements were reduced. Other changes in season two include Princess Sally donning a jacket, Dulcy the Dragon being added to the cast and Rotor and Antoine receiving new designs. ABC also ended up, in some weeks, airing back-to-back episodes of this show during the 1st season, while in Season 2, each time slot for the show was for a single episode only.

=== Cancellation ===
While the second season ended on a cliffhanger, a third season was planned, but before the production on it could start, the show was cancelled for a number of reasons. According to the show's second season head writer, Ben Hurst in an interview found in the 2007 complete series DVD set, as well as archived conversations with fans online from the late 1990s, the show was cancelled due to being pre-empted for sport events, competing in the same time slot as FOX's popular Mighty Morphin Power Rangers and most notably due to ABC (who at the time entered a limited partnership with DiC Entertainment before becoming its owner) being bought by Disney and new people in charge coming in who were not interested in renewing the show.

At the same time, Hurst also denied the rumored reason for the show's cancellation being DiC selling the show's animation cels during the show's run without telling Sega of America. This turned out to not only be true, but also the main reason for the show's cancellation. According to the agreements between DiC and Sega from 1991 and 1992, Sega of America was the sole owner of both the Saturday morning and the weekday syndicated shows, as well as their original characters, props, backgrounds, design sheets, storyboards, scripts, cels, music, animation footage, etc. DiC, by selling the show's animation cels, had breached their agreement, which led to Sega seeking legal action in 1995 and filing a prohibitory injunction on DiC, which would prevent them from continuing production on the show, thus ultimately ending the show's run.

=== Reruns, syndication and international distribution ===
After the program's initial run, it appeared on the USA Network's Action Extreme Team block from June 1997 to January 1998. ABC did not replicate this, replacing Sonic with reruns of Free Willy. Sonic the Hedgehog aired in Canada on the CTV Network, with a bonus summer run between June 10 and September 2, 1995. It has not been rerun on broadcast or cable television in Canada since its cancellation on CTV, but was present on the Shomi video-on-demand platform until its November 30, 2016, closure. In 2004, it started airing on Spacetoon TV in the MENA region until May 2015. All scenes with depicted romance have been censored due to federal laws in Saudi Arabia. It also aired on Italia 1 in Italy.

From 1994 to 1996, it had a complete run on the UK television on ITV and Channel 4, In December 1994, the first season was broadcast in the Republic of Ireland on RTÉ2. On September 2, 2016, reruns of the series began airing on Starz.

In September 2003, DIC revealed a new international package consisting of Adventures of Sonic the Hedgehog, Sonic the Hedgehog and the Sonic Christmas Blast special, titled "Totally Sonic!". The package would also feature digitally re-mastered, color-enhanced versions of the shows with new contemporary music, as well as bonus director's cut "Secret Sonic" episodes. The package appears to have never materialized, or at least not in the way originally described with bonus "Secret Sonic" episodes.

As of 2020, the show can be found on demand on Pluto TV, on Paramount+, as well as YouTube. On March 15, 2021, it began airing in Malaysia on TA-DAA!.

On September 21, 2026, the show began airing on MeTV Toons.

=== Home releases ===
| VHS/DVD name | Episodes | Distributor | Release date | Note |
|---|---|---|---|---|
| Super Sonic | "Super Sonic" "Sonic & Sally" | Buena Vista Home Video (1994); Lions Gate Home Entertainment/Trimark Home Video (2002) | October 21, 1994 (BVHV); February 26, 2002 (Lions Gate) | |
| Sonic Racer | "Sonic Racer" "Sonic Boom" | Buena Vista Home Video (1994); Lions Gate Home Entertainment/Trimark Home Video (2002) | October 21, 1994 (BVHV); February 26, 2002 (Lions Gate) | |
| Hooked on Sonics | "Hooked on Sonics" "Warp Sonic" | Buena Vista Home Video | October 21, 1994 | |
| Super Sonic | "Super Sonic" "Sonic & Sally" "Sonic Racer" "Sonic Boom" | Lions Gate Home Entertainment/Trimark Home Video (2002); NCircle Entertainment (2008) | February 26, 2002 (Lions Gate); December 23, 2008 (NCircle) | The Lions Gate release has an extra episode ("Sonic and the Secret Scrolls") as an award for completing the trivia game. The NCircle re-issue has the episodes in a different order, and lacks the bonus episode. |
| The Complete Series | All 26 episodes of the series | Shout! Factory | March 27, 2007 | This four disc boxset includes the entire 26 episodes from the series, and are presented in its original, uncut broadcast presentation. Bonus features include: storyboards, concept art, storyboard-to-screen comparisons, deleted/extended scenes, a printable prototype script of the series pilot (Heads or Tails), and interviews with Jaleel White and writer Ben Hurst. The individual cases and the DVDs themselves also feature fan art submitted to Shout! Factory during the box set's development phase. The set features cover art by Ken Penders, and was released by Shout! Factory and Vivendi Visual Entertainment. The Region 2 version was distributed by Delta Music Group PLC in the UK and released on September 10, 2007. While it contains the same content and bonus features as the Shout! Factory release (minus the printable pilot script, despite being mentioned on the box, as well as the hidden extra footage from interviews with Jaleel White and Ben Hurst), it uses different artwork for menus and packaging and the content itself has been reshuffled (discs 1-3 feature all episodes in production order and disc 4 contains all bonus features). |
| The Fight for Freedom | "Hooked on Sonics" "Ultra Sonic" "Sonic and the Secret Scrolls" "Warp Sonic" | NCircle Entertainment | September 16, 2008 | |
| Sonic Goes Green | "Heads or Tails" "Sonic's Nightmare" "Sub-Sonic" "Sonic Past Cool" | NCircle Entertainment | March 3, 2009 | |
| Freedom Fighters Unite | "Sonic Conversion" "Dulcy" "The Void" "Spy Hog" | NCircle Entertainment | May 5, 2009 | |
| Sonic Forever! | "No Brainer" "Blast To The Past (Part 1) "Blast to the Past" (Part 2) "Fed Up With Antoine" and "Ghost Busted" "The Odd Couple" and "Ro-Becca" | NCircle Entertainment | March 16, 2010 | |
| Doomsday Project | "Harmonic Sonic" "Game Guy" "Cry of the Wolf" "Drood Henge" "The Doomsday Project" | NCircle Entertainment | August 31, 2010 | |
| The Complete Series | All 26 episodes of the series | NCircle Entertainment | September 19, 2023 | This DVD box set features all 26 episodes on a two-disc box set (13 episodes each). This release has no special features on it. |

== In other media ==
=== Comics ===
Archie's Sonic the Hedgehog comic book was initially based on the Saturday morning cartoon. From its earliest issues, the book shared the characters and story premise established within it. However, the comic differed in that it featured humorous plots modeled after the weekday show. After writer Ken Penders had the opportunity to view the Saturday morning program, the comic gradually became adventure-driven.

The comic series shifted focus again after ABC cancelled Sonic the Hedgehog, developing into a relationship-based superhero story, and following a reboot, Archie's Sonic was primarily inspired by the video game series. Nevertheless, the characters and locales from the Saturday morning cartoon remained prominent until the comic's cancellation in July 2017.

=== Video games ===
Several video games were intended to use elements from the TV series, although only one was completed. This was Sonic Spinball, released in 1993 for the Sega Genesis. It contained characters from the show, including Princess Sally, Bunnie Rabbot, Rotor and Muttski. Spinball was commissioned due to Sonic the Hedgehog 3 being pushed back from its intended 1993 release in the holiday shopping season to February 1994, with the game being developed in under a year. An 8-bit port of the game was also released for the Master System and Game Gear due to the poor reception of Sonic Drift in Japan.

Another video game tentatively titled Sonic-16 was intended to be set in the same universe, with a prototype being created by Sega Technical Institute in November 1993. However, Yuji Naka and Sega management disliked the project, allegedly due to its slow-paced nature, and it was soon cancelled without any further development. Directly afterwards, the same team worked on Sonic Mars; this would have featured Princess Sally and Bunnie Rabbot as playable characters. This project eventually evolved into Sonic X-treme, which was cancelled in 1996 due to development difficulties. Hackers also found within the data of the arcade game SegaSonic the Hedgehog (1993) a near-complete sprite sheet for the Robotnik design used in the cartoon, with it being speculated it was to be used in a scrapped English localization.

In the North American Sonic CD manual, Amy Rose is identified as Princess Sally.

=== Revival attempts ===
The co-story editor of the show's second season, Ben Hurst, spent many years trying to revive the series through various media. He would go on to write for Sonic Underground, but due to the plot of the series already being set in stone by the time he, and his co-writer Pat Allee, came on board the series, they were unable to do so. Hurst would later state that, had he been brought on to the series first, he would have made it the third season of Sonic SatAM. He would also state that, if forced to include songs in the series, he would have either simply had it play over footage, or had Bunnie and Antoine (or Tails, according to his friend Allison Scharlemann), sing the songs.

Hurst would later attend San Diego Comic-Con in August 1999, meeting the head writer of the Archie Sonic comics, Ken Penders. Hurst expressed interest in wrapping up the SatAM story in a comic, with him eventually being offered a Sonic Super Special. However, Hurst eventually decided to pass on this. Penders said the reason he passed was that Archie's pay rates were much lower than that of animation writing. Although Hurst would additionally state a while after this that it simply would not have been possible to conclude the series in a single comic, and would need at least 17 to 20 issues to properly conclude the story. Penders's retellings of the story would also feature some contradictions, as in an earlier telling of these events, he stated Art Mawhinney, a storyboard artist for SatAM, would have been assigned to do the art for this Super Special. However, he would later on state that Patrick "Spaz" Spazinate was actually assigned to the pencils, with Penders likely having done the inking.

=== Cancelled film follow-up/continuation ===
After this, Hurst looked into other avenues for continuing the SatAM story, with him considering the idea of either reviving the series for a third and fourth season, before considering the idea of instead concluding the story in a film. He'd eventually have a meeting with DiC executive Robby London on February 29, 2000. Hurst learned quite a bit about the animation industry, and realized that reviving the series for more televised seasons simply did not seem viable. While he said direct to video was more likely, he felt the best bet was to attempt to conclude the SatAM story as a feature film. Robby London gave Hurst the number of a Sega executive. "My marketing strategy is simple: a great film could create an awakened interest in Sonic, breathe new life into the existing produced series and increase the marketing and merchandising possibilities for the little blue guy."

Hurst would eventually call said the Sega executive, explaining his idea for a Sonic feature film to her, to which they had a very pleasant conversation, and she said she'd like to talk again. The next day, Ken Penders gave him a call, alerted by his contact in their office that he was interested in getting a Sonic movie going. "I generously offered to include him in the effort and told him my strategy. Get SEGA to become invested in the idea by hiring us to interview their creative game designers, execs, etc and see if we could develop a story line that would fulfill the third season - and simultaneously give them creative ideas to develop new games. A win-win, situation." However, once he called Sega back, his contact's demeanor had completely changed; they angrily stated that Sega is paid to develop Sonic projects, rather than paying others to do so. Hurst theorized that Penders had told them about their strategy in a "less-than-flattering way".

While this event caused Hurst to briefly give up on trying to revive the SatAM series, he would eventually start working on it again once more. During 2003, Hurst would start writing a story document for the conclusion film, and, according to him, he had dozens of notes with story ideas on them.

In 2005, Hurst's best friend (and husband to his sister) was diagnosed with cancer, and was given only months to live. After a long talk with him about their long friendship, the topic of Sonic came up once again. "As we were discussing it, he reminded me that none of us know how long we will be allowed to stay here on earth. Then, he put his hand on my shoulder and informed me, 'Ya gotta follow your dreams,' and with a grin, he added, 'Juice and jam time for both of us.'" With this discussion, Hurst decided to try and revive the film project one more time. His last plan to get the SatAM movie out was to get a completely separate movie out, and then use his name on that movie to pitch the SatAM movie. Len Janson helped write the script, a film entitled "The Gift", loosely based on the story of "Le Pétomane". However, this attempt also failed, with him saying "I don't think it will ever sell. It would be a monster hit, but Hollywood Execs are scared to death of it."

Hurst still never gave up hope, and apparently planned to try one more time, by gathering a group of fans together to make a presentation for Sega. However, this would not come to pass.

After Hurst's death in August 2011, Allison Scharlemann released some of his notes for the SatAM film. Scharlemann would later share more details she remembered from her conversations with Hurst on forums, the Ben Hurst memorial, and for "Ben's Vision - The Lost Sonic SatAM Third Season/Film", a documentary which told the story of Hurst's many revival attempts, and what was known of his plans for the unmade film/season.

=== Team Sea3on ===
From 2009 onwards, a group of fans calling themselves "Team Sea3on" spun out from the online "FUS" community ("Fans United for SatAM"), and began work on bringing a third season of the series to life, basing the plot lines on both Ben Hurst's original notes as well as the group's active webcomic. The group are presently working within 'proper legal channels' to advance the project with Sega's awareness. The effort gained attention from the likes of IGN. In April 2022, a full teaser trailer was uploaded to the group's YouTube channel, with a cover of the SatAM theme song "Fastest Thing Alive" by Johnny Gioeli of Crush 40.

== Reception ==
Sonic the Hedgehog ranked No. 9 for all of Saturday Morning with a 5.2 rating, an estimated 4.8 million viewers during its first season.

Ian Flynn thought that Sonic the Hedgehog's story has too much attention on Princess Sally, giving Sonic the role of deus ex machina to deal with every episode's conflict. Also, he noted the show's "90's eco-awareness".

The first season received an approval rating of 40% on review aggregator website Rotten Tomatoes, based on five reviews. Patrick Lee of The A.V. Club gave it a positive review, saying that "the show pushed its cartoon animal characters to the most dramatic places they could go without venturing into self-parody. Over the course of the series, the characters dealt with loss, romance, and death [...] The entire series successfully pulled off that sort of balancing act, and even 20 years later, it's still a solid Saturday morning cartoon". Mark Bozon of IGN criticized the show as dated, considering it "so bad, it's good." Writing for DVD Talk, Todd Douglass Jr. remarked that Sonic did not stand the test of time. Overall, he considered it to be of low quality, although he found the stories "Ultra Sonic" and "Blast to the Past" to be "the crème of the crop."

Luke Owen of Flickering Myth felt Sonic aged better than is often supposed, praising its well-executed characterizations and treatment of war, although he considered Antoine to be "one of the worst characters committed to a cartoon series." GamesRadar listed the show as one of "the worst things to happen to Sonic." It criticized its plot and characters as "unwanted". The Escapist journalist Bob Chipman credited the series with providing a viably menacing take on Doctor Robotnik, and an engaging narrative. Bob Mackey of USgamer wrote that the cartoon's writing did not live up to its intriguing premise. In particular, he argued that the Antoine character perpetrated negative French stereotypes.

Sonic co-creator Naoto Ohshima later stated that he is a fan of the series and its characters, and that he owns a promotional cel given to him by DiC Entertainment during the show's production.
