= Sonic Speed Simulator =

2022 Roblox video game

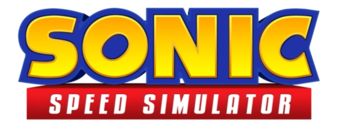
- Developer: Gamefam
- Publisher: Gamefam
- Series: Sonic the Hedgehog
- Engine: Roblox Studio
- Platforms: Various: Windows; macOS; Xbox One; Xbox X/S; PlayStation 4; PlayStation 5; iOS; Android
- Release: Official: April 16, 2022: Beta: April 13, 2022; PlayStation 4: October 10, 2023; PlayStation 5: April 14, 2026
- Genres: MMO, incremental, platformer
- Mode: Multiplayer

Sonic Speed Simulator (Note: The in-game title was updated to become Sonic Speed Simulator: Reborn on February 10, 2023. However, this change has yet to be reflected on the game's page on the Roblox website.) is a massively multiplayer online incremental platformer game developed and published by Gamefam, under license and in association with Sega of America, and serves as an official entry in the Sonic the Hedgehog franchise on the video game creation system, Roblox. The gameplay involves speeding around and collecting Chaos Orbs to level up and increase speed and jumping power.

== Gameplay ==
A player running through Green Hill Zone and collecting Chaos Orbs (Windows)

The player walks around and collects Chaos Orbs and rings around a world. While walking around gives them experience points (EXP), collecting Chaos Orbs gives more experience points (EXP) to help them level up, which then increases their speed and jumping power. The maximum experience points (EXP) earned per level increases with the level. Other ways to earn experience points (EXP) are by running and jumping through Sky Rings, completing Quests, and Time Trials (challenges that involve passing through spawned checkpoints and reaching the goal within a world as fast as possible), and buying from in-game shops. At any time, the player can rebirth, which resets the player's speed, power, and level, but returns Skill Points, which can be used to buy permanent upgrades.

Initially, the player's character is their Roblox avatar, but they can obtain Sonic characters to play as by completing Quests and limited-time event objectives, collecting cards, redeeming codes, and purchasing them for a limited time. Trails and pets, which give upgradeable benefits, are obtained through spending rings in vending machines and completing Quests, event objectives, and Time Trials. Trails and pets can be leveled up at Upgrade Machines with rings, Red Star Rings, or both, and identical ones can be fused together into "Evolved" forms. To unlock the next world, the player must earn five Gate Keys from Quests.

== History ==
Sonic Speed Simulator was pitched by Joe Ferencz, the CEO of Gamefam, to Ivo Gerscovich, Sega's chief brand officer (CBO), for Sonic the Hedgehog. Ferencz sought to develop an official Roblox game for a major video game franchise. At the time, Sonic the Hedgehog had less popularity among younger audiences and Sega was looking for ways to raise it, such as with the 2020 Sonic the Hedgehog film. Ferencz pitched with the expectation that the film would leverage Sonic's popularity, and Gersovich took it as an opportunity to connect the Sonic brand with Roblox's young player base.

The game was announced and released in closed beta on April 13, 2022, requiring 50 Robux for access to play, before being fully released as free-to-play three days later on April 16, 2022. The game had 70 million plays and 275,000 concurrent users (CCUs) in the first week of its release, which made its launch Roblox's largest. It went on to reach 500 million visits in its first four months. Joe Ferencz described it as "the No. 1 branded game of all time on Roblox". In August 2024, Sonic Speed Simulator became the first branded game on Roblox to reach one billion visits. During the Sonic Central 2022 presentation shown on June 7, it was announced that a new area of Chemical Plant Zone would be released on June 11. Additionally, a code for the Amy Chao was unveiled and became available later that same day.

On February 26, 2023, a new feature was added to the game, known as "Auto Run", where the player automatically runs around the entire map, and collects rings and experience points (EXP) without any control over their character. Many players expressed disappointment with this update, citing the slower pace, not being able to jump or go side-to-side, and the rewards system as downsides. On March 11, 2023, Shadow the Hedgehog was added to the game, with players having the opportunity to unlock the character during the Release Shadow event.

=== Promotional events ===
From December 10 through December 16, 2022, players could attend a special early screening of the then-upcoming first episode of the Sonic Prime television series before its initial Netflix debut. To promote the event, Gamefam, Sega, Netflix, and WildBrain Studios partnered with Roblox Corporation by allowing users the ability to earn Nine's Mechanical Arms in the form of a virtual UGC accessory.

=== Controversy ===
Throughout the month of December 2022, several allegations were brought up by numerous ex-employees who had worked on the game and raised concerns online in regards to Gamefam crunching and underpaying, as well as laying off some of their employees before the holiday season without much warning, which was against the contract. As a form of protest, fans began using the hashtag, #SonicSweatshopSimulator on Twitter in an effort to bring attention to allegations. In response, the company began banning users from the Sonic Speed Simulator's Discord server who mentioned the issues and published a statement denying the allegations.

== Reception ==
Alan Wen's review on Eurogamer was positive and praised the 3D, open world gameplay, stating that Sonic Speed Simulator is "probably the most polished experience to have graced Roblox so far", but criticized the progression, obstacle courses, and race minigame, finding the progression to be unsatisfying and race minigame as too basic and lag-inducing.

== See also ==
- List of Roblox games – A list-topic about notable Roblox games
- List of Sonic the Hedgehog video games
