= Live from City Winery Nashville =

Live album by Sara Evans with Barker Family Band
- Released: August 30, 2019
- Venue: City Winery, Nashville, Tennessee
- Genre: Country
- Label: Born to Fly

Sara Evans with the Barker Family Band chronology
The Barker Family Band (2019)	Live from City Winery Nashville (2019)

Sara Evans chronology
The Barker Family Band (2019)	Live from City Winery Nashville (2019)	Copy That (2020)

Live from City Winery Nashville is a live album released by American country artist Sara Evans and the Barker Family Band. It was released on August 30, 2019 via Born to Fly Records. The release is Evans's first and only live album to date. It is the second release Evans did with the Barker Family Band, a family musical group that included her children and siblings.

== Background and content ==
Live from City Winery Nashville is the second collaborative project between Evans and the Barker Family Band. The album was released following their concerts at various City Winery venues across the United States in mid 2019. The album includes songs previously released on their 2019 extended play as well as new tracks previously unreleased. Among the new tracks featured on the album are cover versions of songs recorded by other artists. This includes "Why Not Me" by The Judds, "As" by Stevie Wonder and "Tennessee Whiskey" by David Allan Coe.

Also included on the album is hits previously made famous by Evans herself. This includes "Suds in the Bucket" and "Born to Fly". On the latter track, the Fairground Saints are featured providing harmony vocals.

== Promotion and reception ==
To promote the live album, two tracks were offered for purchase: "A Little Bit Stronger" was made available August 16 and "Tennessee Whiskey" was made available on August 23. The album has since received praise from writers and journalists. Writers of the BroadwayWorld online magazine praised the vocals from Evans's children, calling them "mesmerizing harmonies." Guitar Girl Magazine also praised the harmony vocals on the album in their 2019 review of the album.

== Track listing ==
Live from City Winery Nashville
No.	Title	Writer(s)	Original Artist	Length
1.	"Southern Cross"	Stephen Stills; Michael Curtis; Rick Curtis	Crosby, Stills, Nash & Young	6:36
2.	"Four-Thirty"	Hillary Lindsey; Bill Lloyd	Sara Evans	5:44
3.	"XO"	Ryan Tedder; Terius Nash; Beyoncé Knowles	Beyoncé	3:53
4.	"Why Not Me"	Harlan Howard; Brent Maher; Sonny Throckmorton	The Judds	4:08
5.	"(You Make Me Feel Like) a Natural Woman"	Gerry Goffin; Carole King; Jerry Wexler	Aretha Franklin	7:46
6.	"Dreams"	Stevie Nicks	Fleetwood Mac	4:30
7.	"A Little Bit Stronger"	Luke Laird; Lindsey; Hillary Scott	Sara Evans	6:42
8.	"Otis Redding"	Lindsey; Angelo Petraglia; Troy Verges	Sara Evans	5:08
9.	"Suds in the Bucket"	Billy Montana; Tammy Wagoner	Sara Evans	5:26
10.	"So Far Away"	King	Carole King	4:21
11.	"Long Ride Home"	Patty Griffin	Patty Griffin	3:39
12.	"Long Way Down"	Liz Hengber; Tammy Rogers; Jerry Salley	Sara Evans	5:30
13.	"Not Over You"	Gavin DeGraw; Ryan Tedder	Gavin DeGraw	4:24
14.	"As"	Stevie Wonder	Stevie Wonder	5:13
15.	"Tennessee Whiskey"	Dean Dillon; Linda Hargrove	David Allan Coe	5:03
16.	"Born to Fly" (featuring Fairground Saints)	Evans; Marcus Hummon; Darrell Scott	Sara Evans	5:31

== Release history ==
Region	Date	Format	Label	Ref.
United States	August 30, 2019	digital download	Born to Fly	
