= Sibila Vargas =

American journalist

- Born: May 10, 1968 (age 58); Queens, New York
- Education: Long Island University
- Occupation: News Anchor
- Years active: 1997 - Present
- Employer: WNBC-TV 2013-2016
- Partner: Alex Pappas
- Children: 2 Christos Vargas-Pappas, Nicholas Vargas-Pappas
- Relatives: Ike Pappas

Sibila Vargas (born May 10, 1968) is an American news anchor who used to be the anchor of the 5, 6 and 11 p.m. weekday editions on WNBC-TV in New York City. More recently, Sibila also used to work at WSPA-TV in Spartanburg, SC and also used to work at both KCBS-TV in Los Angeles, and KRIV in Houston, Texas, and was also a former CNN entertainment reporter. Her mother and father are from the Dominican Republic.

== Early years ==
Vargas was a freelance entertainment reporter for KTLA-TV in Los Angeles, California. Prior to her tenure at KTLA-TV, Vargas was a guest co-host of ABC's The View. Vargas has also been the host of TV Guide Channel's Hollywood Insider, Fox Movie Channel News and FXM Dailies, Paramount Domestic TV's Real TV and guest host of Fox Sports and Fit TV's Forever Young. She began her broadcasting career at WPIX-TV in New York as a writer and producer.

Vargas graduated cum laude from Long Island University.

== Tenure at CNN ==
Joining CNN in March 2004, Vargas served as an entertainment correspondent/anchor for CNN/U.S based in CNN's Los Angeles, California bureau. Vargas was also a regular guest on American Morning's "90 Second Pop" and Anderson Cooper 360°.

She reported on several key entertainment events, including Fox network's reality show American Idol and the finale of the NBC sitcom Friends.

She made a name for herself in the blogosphere with a hostile 2006 interview with Neil Young, in which she questioned his patriotism for his having criticized George W. Bush. Vargas suggested that Young was criticizing the president in order to sell records, and expressed outrage that a "Canadian" with "less of a platform to say these things" would speak openly about America without considering the "backlash".
