= This Week in Baseball =

American baseball television series

- Also known as: TWIB
- Genre: Sports highlights
- Created by: Joe Reichler
- Written by: Mark Durand; James Rogal; Jeff Scott
- Presented by: Mel Allen; Warner Fusselle; Ozzie Smith; Cam Brainard; Jennie Finch; Kait Maniscalco
- Theme music composer: Opening theme: Mike Vickers; Closing theme: John Scott
- Opening theme: "Jet Set"
- Ending theme: "Gathering Crowds"
- Composer: Matthew Cang
- Country of origin: United States
- Original language: English

Production
- Executive producers: Larry Parker; Geoff Belinfante
- Cinematography: Savas Alatis; Richard Wilmot
- Editors: Tony Tocci; Michael Kostel; Marco Lagana
- Running time: 30 minutes
- Production companies: Major League Baseball Productions; The Phoenix Communications Group; Fox Sports

Original release
- Network: First-run syndication
- Release: April 1, 1977 – September 26, 1998
- Network: Fox
- Release: April 8, 2000 – September 24, 2011
- Release: April 3, 2026 – present

Related
- In the Zone; MLB Player Poll; Major League Baseball Game of the Week

This Week in Baseball (abbreviated as TWiB, pronounced phonetically) is an American television series that focuses on Major League Baseball highlights. Broadcast weekly during baseball season (and in its second incarnation, prior to marquee MLB games and during rain-delays) the program featured highlights of recent games, interviews with players, and other regular features. The popularity of the program, best known for its original host, New York Yankees play-by-play commentator Mel Allen, also helped influence the creation of other sports highlight programs, including ESPN's SportsCenter.

== History ==
When Commissioner Bowie Kuhn first took office in 1969, the only weekly showcase of Major League Baseball was its Saturday afternoon Game of the Week on NBC. On the other hand, the National Football League had produced its own syndicated highlight programs like This Week in Pro Football through its in-house unit NFL Films. In response to its competition, This Week in Baseball premiered in first-run syndication in 1977. The show was originally hosted by long-time New York Yankees announcer Mel Allen.

The program was typically picked up by stations that also had television rights to major league franchises like WTBS in Atlanta, KTTV in Los Angeles, and WGN in Chicago. TWIB would also air on owned-and-operated NBC stations as a prelude of sorts to NBC's Game of the Week telecasts.

According to Curt Smith's biography on Mel Allen entitled The Voice: Mel Allen's Untold Story, when NBC lost the rights to the Game of the Week to CBS (who, unlike NBC, didn't broadcast regular-season games for all 26 weeks of the season) after the 1989 season, TWIB, sans a strong anchor, proceeded to either lose markets or move to weaker, (often independent) stations. Even more so, TWIB was now (under the CBS umbrella) averaging a 1-2 rating and, in several places, airing at midnight (as opposed to, for example, WNBC New York at 1:30 p.m.; in this case, however, TWIB moved to WWOR, which had the rights to the New York Mets at the time, and aired on Sunday afternoons as the Mets' lead-in for their game telecasts.

=== End of the Mel Allen era ===
In 1996, Mel Allen died. Warner Fusselle, who had previously contributed the "TWIB Notes" and "TWIB Ticker" segments as well as substituting for Allen frequently in later years, and filled in for Allen when needed ultimately took over for the remainder of the season. In 1997, the recently retired Ozzie Smith became the new permanent host with Fusselle serving as the show's announcer and main contributor. TWIB had pretty much moved into being more of cable-syndicated show as in Detroit for instance, it was shown on PASS (Pro-Am Sports System). By this point, however, TWIB appeared to have run its course and the 1998 season proved to be the last for the original series.

=== From syndication to Fox ===
In 2000, Fox Sports decided to cancel its young-viewer-centered baseball series In the Zone (Fox's answer to NBA Inside Stuff) in favor of reviving This Week in Baseball. While the show was much more feature-driven than it had been before and was still targeted at the younger audience, the show retained some of the older features, such as plays of the week and the same open and closing themes.

Cam Brainard hosted and narrated the new series. For much of the show's run, a claymation version of Mel Allen introduced and closed the show.

Although all other children's programs were cancelled by Fox on December 28, 2008, TWIB was retained at least for the 2009 season, airing for the first time in high definition. It also aired on the MLB Network.

By the 2011 season, TWIB's ratings declined as the result of such shows as ESPN's Baseball Tonight and SportsCenter, which showed baseball highlights daily. The rise of baseball highlights on the internet and the MLB Network also sealed TWIB's fate. In 2012, Fox cancelled TWIB and replaced it with a new baseball-oriented show, MLB Player Poll.

=== Second Revival on MLB.TV & Twitter ===
In April 2026, MLB announced it would be reviving This Week in Baseball as a short-form re-imagined series, releasing new episodes each Friday throughout the 2026 season and post-season. The revival would release new episodes each Friday on MLB's Twitter account and on MLB's streaming platform MLB.TV.

The new version, hosted by Kait Maniscalco, is produced by MLB Productions. Each episode, around 10 minutes in length, features spotlights on recent baseball stories, related flashbacks, TWIB Notes focusing on specific factoids for the week, Road TWIB, which features every week a different MLB ballpark and its attractions, and closing with "How 'Bout That?", which features bloopers and defensive highlights of the week, with local TV and radio calls of the plays and archival audio clips from former host Mel Allen relating to the plays as well.

==== Format ====
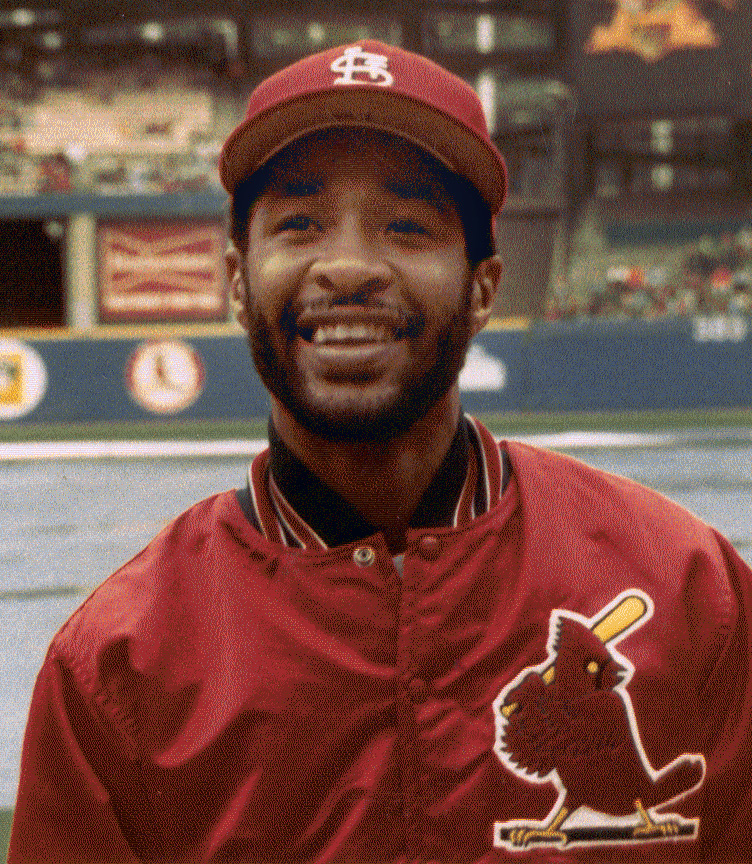
Cardinals great Ozzie Smith hosted TWIB from 1997 to 1998.

The show also aired on regional sports networks around the country, on Rogers Sportsnet in Canada, and was also often played as part of the pre-game entertainment on the TV screens of major league stadiums. From 2004-2005, segments of the show were hosted by U.S. fast-pitch softball sensation Jennie Finch.

In 2007, TWIB was slated for 26 episodes running from April to the end of September, focusing on stories of various clubs and different baseball themes each week. The segment "Front Row Fan" features celebrities reminiscing about their favorite baseball memories. Guests have included Tom Hanks, Bernie Mac, Alyssa Milano and Kevin James. There is also a play of the week section and TWIBIA, in which a trivia question is asked before the commercial break.

Highlights of the past week's action are used less frequently, except for a closing highlight reel set to popular songs. The highlight reel is named How 'Bout That?, in reference to Mel Allen's well-known catchphrase. Video is gathered from each of the 30 Clubs' Stadium Loggers, who compile highlights of each game and send them to MLB Productions in Secaucus, NJ.

The program also used educational segments to help it qualify for E/I status in the United States.

==== Episode status ====
Reruns of the 1977–1998 Mel Allen version of the show was aired on ESPN Classic in the 2000s and Fox Sports 1 in 2020 when the 2020 Major League Baseball season was postponed due to the COVID-19 pandemic.

Some episodes of the 1977–1998 version of the show are available for streaming online on Pluto TV and Prime Video in the United States.

== Music ==
The opening theme music to TWIB is "Jet Set", composed by Mike Vickers, a former member of the original Manfred Mann band. "Jet Set" was first used as the theme for the original 1974–75 version of the game show Jackpot. When Fox brought TWIB back, a slightly revamped version of "Jet Set" was written. The 2026 revival uses the original version of "Jet Set."

The closing theme to the show is "Gathering Crowds", composed by John Scott. It is typically played over a montage of baseball's greatest moments, building to a crescendo with a punctuated three-note chord as the MLB logo slides into view. The piece has also been utilized to similar effect for montages and credits at the end of, for example, local TV newscasts. It too ends the 2026 revival.
