= Gamefam =

American video game company

- Type: Private
- Industry: Video games
- Founded: 2019; 7 years ago
- Founder: Joe Ferencz
- Headquarters: Los Angeles, California, United States
- Key people: Ricardo Briceno (CEO)
- Products: Video games
- Brands: RoMonitor
- Number of employees: 250+ (January 2023)
- Subsidiaries: Silicon Digital
- Website: Gamefam.com

Gamefam Studios is an American video game company that primarily utilizes Roblox as a video game development platform, while also using Fortnite Creative and Minecraft as engines to create maps and minigames. It has produced content for brands such as Sonic the Hedgehog, the National Football League (NFL), Hot Wheels, Doctor Strange, Kung Fu Panda, Samsung, and Puma and staged virtual concerts for musicians such as The Chainsmokers and Saweetie.

== History ==
Gamefam was founded in 2019 in Los Angeles by Joe Ferencz, who served as the company's chief executive officer (CEO) until 2026. Ferencz was originally involved with bringing Hot Wheels into the Forza series and Rocket League, and while doing so, he was observing Roblox's success as a free-to-play video game platform.

Explaining his reason for founding Gamefam, Ferencz told TechCrunch, "Roblox truly is the Metaverse for this younger generation. What that means is that each game needs to have a very distinctive and attractive immersion to it, in a way that mobile free-to-play doesn't." The company is described by Ferencz as the "first and only fully-dedicated, professional game publishing company on Roblox" and has recruited veteran game developers. In late February 2026, Ricardo Briceno succeeded Ferencz as CEO, while Ferencz transitioned to a strategic advisor role.

=== Partnerships ===
In November 2020, Gamefam, with the partnership of Mattel, released Hot Wheels Open World on Roblox, which is a Hot Wheels-themed open world racing game. In 2021, Gamefam made a financial investment to the RoMonitor Stats platform, and its parent company, Silicon Digital too. In October 2021, Gamefam partnered with WowWee to create toys for their popular Roblox game Twilight Daycare. They later launched the L.O.L. Surprise! brand into Twilight Daycare too. In November 2021, Gamefam partnered with WildBrain to start integrating various brands into their Roblox games.

In March 2022, Gamefam announced they have raised US$25,000,000 dollars in its Series A funding round, which was led by Konvoy Ventures and participated in by Play Ventures, Makers Fund, Bessemer Venture Partners, and Galaxy Interactive. In April 2022, Gamefam, with the partnership of Sega of America, released Sonic Speed Simulator on Roblox, which is a Sonic the Hedgehog-based video game. Its launch was the largest on Roblox, with around 70 million plays and around 275,000 concurrent users in the first week of its release and would later reach around 500 million visits in its first four months. Joe Ferencz called it "the No. 1 branded game of all time on Roblox". In October 2022, 2023 & 2024, Gamefam partnered with Spin Master for three consecutive years and Feld Entertainment (2022 only) to introduce Monster Jam into Roblox through a month-long integration process for each October within the Car Dealership Tycoon Roblox game.

In February 2023, Gamefam partnered with Paramount Games Studio and Nickelodeon to develop official Roblox games for the SpongeBob SquarePants and Teenage Mutant Ninja Turtles franchises, resulting in the releases of SpongeBob Simulator and TMNT: Battle Tycoon. In the same month, Gamefam collaborated with the National Football League (NFL), Intuit, and Warner Music Group to produce a virtual Super Bowl concert on Roblox, featuring hip-hop artist Saweetie in Rhythm City, a music-themed social roleplay game on Roblox. The concert premiered on February 10, 2023, and re-aired hourly until February 12, 2023, coinciding with Super Bowl LVII.

In May 2023, Gamefam collaborated with Cirque du Soleil Entertainment Group to create Cirque du Soleil Tycoon, a circus-themed tycoon game on Roblox. In September 2023, Gamefam partnered with Spin Master again to introduce the "Unicorn Academy" within Twilight Daycare, aiming to engage fans of the Netflix show by airing the show within the Roblox game.

In August 2024, Sonic Speed Simulator became the first branded game on Roblox to surpass one billion visits. In January 2025, Gamefam collaborated with Kidz Bop and Concord Records to bring their kid-friendly pop songs into Really Easy Obby game on Roblox. In December 2025, Gamefam rebranded their Super League Soccer into FIFA's official flagship on Roblox, FIFA Super Soccer. Alongside the rebranding, the game hosted Adidas Football Festival.

=== Creator Fund ===
In May 2024, Gamefam launched the Gamefam Creator Fund, a US$5,000,000 dollar initiative aimed at supporting user-generated content (UGC) developers on platforms like Roblox and Fortnite. The fund provided selected creators with investments ranging from $10,000 to over $100,000, along with access to Gamefam's expertise in game design, monetization strategies, and analytics.

=== Accusations of employee mistreatment ===
In December 2022, former employees accused Gamefam of underpaying their employees while crunching them, as well as laying some off before the holidays without much warning, which was reportedly against the contract. Because the employees reported working on Sonic Speed Simulator while being mistreated, the hashtag, #SonicSweatshopSimulator, trended on Twitter as a protest by fans. Gamefam released a statement denying the accusations and began banning players who brought them up in the Sonic Speed Simulator Discord server.

In April 2023, Gamefam settled with an employee after he had filed a complaint to the National Labor Relations Board alleging that the company had violated the National Labor Relations Act by threatening retaliation against employees that spoke with coworkers about their salaries. The employee was paid US$5,000 in bonuses and Gamefam was legally obligated to remind its employees of their rights.

== Games ==
Gamefam's current Roblox games include:

- Adopt a Baby, a role-playing game where players act as parents or guardians to adopt and care for a baby.
- Bakugan Brawl Simulator
- Bank Tycoon
- Barbie Dreamhouse Tycoon, a licensed Barbie game.
- Build-A-Bear Tycoon, an idle advergame for Build-A-Bear Workshop.
- Build to Survive Simulator, a round-based survival sandbox game.
- Car Dealership Tycoon, a car dealership-based tycoon game. (Partnership not ownership)
- Car Factory Tycoon
- Chair Buddy
- Cirque du Soleil Tycoon (Circus Tycoon)
- City Life Tycoon, a building and tycoon simulation game.
- Creepy Crawlers, a horror with a focus on spiders and other creepy monsters.
- Deathrun, a round-based platformer game.
- Deliveryman Simulator, a delivery-based incremental game.
- Dream Island Tycoon
- Easy Obby™, a platform game.
- Easy Teamwork Obby, a team-based beginner-friendly incremental platformer game.
- Eating Simulator, an eating-based incremental game.
- Escape Granny Obby, incremental horror platformer game.
- Escape Super Fat Guy Obby, a platformer game where players must escape from a hungry character.
- Flag Wars
- Funky Friday, a rhythm game unofficially based on Friday Night Funkin'.
- Get Huge Simulator
- Giant Mansion Tycoon, a tycoon-style wealth accumulation game.
- Grow Up Simulator
- Hat Simulator, an incremental game with the main objective of stacking hats.
- Hospital Life Tycoon
- Hot Wheels Open World, a licensed Hot Wheels open world racing game.
- Junk Wars
- Little World, an insect adventure game.
- Mansion Tycoon, a tycoon-style mansion building game.
- Maple Hospital, a hospital-based roleplay game.
- Military Tycoon, a military shooter game that uses the Advanced Combat System framework which lets players build their own military base.
- My Hero Academia Battlegrounds, a licensed My Hero Academia action role-playing game
- My Pet City RP
- Ninja Fighting Simulator
- Ninja Master Simulator
- Ocean Simulator
- Polybattle, a first-person shooter.
- Really Easy Obby, a beginner-friendly incremental platformer game.
- RoBeats, a rhythm game.
- Shadovis RPG
- Shoot Out, a western-themed third-person shooter.
- Slashing Simulator, a weapon-based simulator in which involves the use of katanas.
- Smack Stars, a turn-based combat game.
- Sonic Speed Simulator, a licensed Sonic the Hedgehog incremental platform game.
- Space War Tycoon, a war simulation featuring PvP combat set in space.
- Speed Run Simulator, a speed-based incremental game.
- SpongeBob Simulator, a licensed SpongeBob SquarePants game.
- Starving Artists, a donation-based game where players can create their own pixel art and sell it to other players.
- Super Fun Ball Obby, a platformer game in which players are trapped inside a ball.
- Super League Soccer, a fast-paced 4v4 association football (soccer) game.
- Team Stepmom Run, a platformer game where players must escape from a stepmom character.
- TMNT: Battle Tycoon, a licensed Teenage Mutant Ninja Turtles game.
- Tower of Misery, a round-based platform game.
- Twilight Daycare, a daycare roleplay game.
- Ultimate Driving, an open world racing game based in the Eastern United States.
- Ultra Power Tycoon, a superpower simulation and combat game.
- Untitled Fling Game, a physics simulator where players fling objects and each other.
- War Tycoon™, a war simulation where players develop a military base and engage in combat.
- Weapon Crafting Simulator
- Weapon Fighting Simulator
- Would You Rather 2
- Zombie Battle Tycoon
- Zoo Park Tycoon
