= The Highway (SiriusXM) =

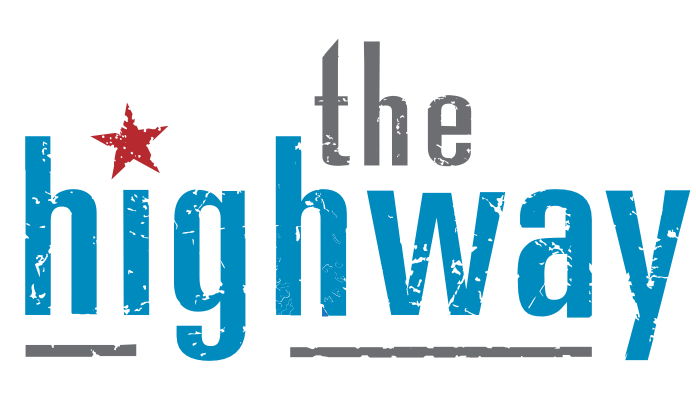
- Broadcast area: United States; Canada
- Frequencies: Sirius XM Radio 56; Dish Network 6056
- RDS: New Country music including the hottest country superstars, up-and-coming artists, and the very latest discoveries direct from Nashville. Plus Nashville Flash music updates throughout the day.
- Branding: Today's Country Hits

Programming
- Format: Hit Country Music

Ownership
- Owner: Sirius XM Radio

History
- First air date: November 12, 2008
- Former names: Highway 16 (XM); New Country (Sirius)
- Former frequencies: Sirius XM Radio 59

Technical information
- Class: Satellite Radio station

Links
- Website: SiriusXM: The Highway

The Highway is a commercial-free country music radio station on SiriusXM channel 56. It was created when Sirius and XM merged their competing hit country stations, "New Country" on Sirius and "Highway 16" on XM. The Highway can also be streamed at SiriusXM.com and through its app for mobile devices. Until February 9, 2010, it was heard on DirecTV channel 814.

The Highway broadcasts from the Bridgestone Arena in Nashville, Tennessee, as well as SiriusXM studio's in New York City.

The Highway is among the most popular music channels on satellite radio. As of 2014, SiriusXM reports it has more than 27 million subscribers.

Most Fridays, listeners visiting Nashville are invited to Chief's on Broadway - a bar owned by Eric Church - to become a part of a live show called the "Music Row Happy Hour" with Buzz Brainard.

The channel spotlights new music through its "Highway Finds" feature. This changed the music business by giving airplay to unsigned and independent artists, creating fresh stars. The channel bypasses the traditional record company lock on the business.

== Hosts ==
- Buzz Brainard
- Cody Alan
- Macie Banks
- Ania Hammar
- Jessica Wade
- Kim Ashley
- Tommy Massad
- Emma Gribbon ("Emmatainment")

== Specialty shows ==
- The Highway Hot 30 Weekend Countdown: Weekly countdown show determined by members of "The Highway Patrol," a free club of listeners who rate the music in a special online application. Saturdays at 9 am and 5 pm, and Sundays at midnight, 6 am, 1 pm and 9 pm Eastern, with repeats all weekend.
- On the Horizon: On the Horizon is a one-hour show that features new songs by up-and-coming artists. Saturdays at 11 am and 7 pm, and Sundays 2 am, 8 am, 3 pm and 11 pm Eastern, with repeats all weekend.
- Outsiders Radio: Every month, Eric Church picks a theme and shares his favorite music around it plus exclusive behind-the-scenes stories.
- Takin' The Wheel: Celebrity guest DJ takeover the show.
- Highway Hang Time: Artists hang in our studios and preview new music. Can also include live exclusive performances.
- Superfan Concerts: Live performances by stars and up-and-coming artists.
- The Music Row Happy Hour: Buzz Brainard hosts Friday 4 pm Eastern live on location from a bar in Nashville with listeners.

== Core Artists ==
- Luke Combs
- Morgan Wallen
- Lainey Wilson
- Kane Brown
- Ella Langley
- Luke Bryan
- Blake Shelton
- Thomas Rhett
- Kelsea Ballerini
- Dan + Shay
- Keith Urban
- Jason Aldean
- Miranda Lambert
- Eric Church
- Old Dominion
- Hardy
- Cody Johnson
- Jordan Davis
- Parker McCollum
- Zach Top
- Tyler Nance
- Megan Maroney

== Highway Finds ==
Highway Finds is a talent discovery program created by SiriusXM's The Highway that spotlights emerging country music artists with strong commercial potential. Selected artists receive increased airplay, on-air promotion, exclusive performances, and exposure across SiriusXM's platforms. Since its launch, Highway Finds has helped introduce future stars such as Florida Georgia Line, Dan + Shay, Sam Hunt, Maren Morris, Luke Combs, Old Dominion, Kelsea Ballerini, Parker McCollum, Carly Pearce, Ashley McBryde, and Gabby Barrett to a national audience before they achieved mainstream success.

Artist	Year	Featured Song	Career Acomplishments
Florida Georgia Line	2012	"Cruise"	1 ACM Duo of the Year; multiple CMA Vocal Duo awards
Parmalee	2013	"Carolina"	
Chase Rice	2013	"Ready Set Roll"	
Cole Swindell	2013	"Chillin' It"	ACM New Artist of the Year; CMA Triple Play Award
JT Hodges	2013		
Blackjack Billy	2013	"The Booze Cruise"	
Sam Hunt	2014	"Leave the Night On"	ACM New Artist of the Year
Maddie & Tae	2014	"Girl in a Country Song"	ACM Duo of the Year
Dan + Shay	2014	"19 You + Me"	3 Grammy Awards; multiple CMA & ACM Duo of the Year awards
Adam Sanders	2014	"Somewhere That You Don't Go"	Winner of season 1 of CBS' The Road
Kelsea Ballerini	2014	"Love Me Like You Mean It"	ACM Female Artist of the Year
Maren Morris	2015	"My Church"	Grammy winner; CMA New Artist; ACM Female Artist of the Year
Old Dominion	2015	"Break Up With Him"	8 consecutive CMA Vocal Group of the Year awards; multiple ACM Group of the Year awards
Luke Combs	2016	"Hurricane"	2x CMA Entertainer of the Year; 2x CMA Male Vocalist; Grammy nominee
Carly Pearce	2016	"Every Little Thing"	CMA Female Vocalist; CMA Musical Event; ACM Single of the Year
William Michael Morgan	2016	"I Met a Girl"	
Seth Ennis	2016	"Woke Up in Nashville"	
Ashley McBryde	2017	"A Little Dive Bar in Dahlonega"	Grammy winner; CMA New Artist of the Year
Adam Doleac	2017	"Whiskey's Fine"	
Jay Allen	2017	"Sounds Good To Me"	
Brown & Gray	2017	"Top Down"	
Midland	2017	"Drinkin' Problem"	Grammy winner (as featured artists); ACM New Vocal Group of the Year
SmithField	2017	"If It Ain't You"	
Tyler Rich	2018	"The Difference"	
The Wild Feathers	2018	"Big Sky"	
Ross Ellis	2018	"Ghosts"	
Brandon Lay	2018	"Yada Yada Yada"	
Ingrid Andress	2019	"More Hearts Than Mine"	
Gabby Barrett	2019	"I Hope"	ACM New Female Artist of the Year
Niko Moon	2019	"Good Time"	
Parker McCollum	2019	"Pretty Heart"	ACM New Male Artist of the Year
Drew Parker	2020	"While You're Gone"	
Shy Carter	2020	"Good Love"	ACM Songwriter of the Year nominee
Morgan Wade	2021	"Wilder Days"	
Hailey Whitters	2021	"Everything She Ain't"	ACM New Female Artist of the Year; Grammy nominee
Flatland Cavalry	2021	"Some Things Never Change"	ACM Group of the Year nominee
Laci Kaye Booth	2021		
Avery Anna	2022	"Narcissist"	
Chase Wright	2022	"Wish You'd Miss Me"	
Nicolle Galyon	2022	“It Ain't Pretty”	
Mackenzie Carpenter	2022	"Can't Nobody"	
Griffen Palmer	2023	"Second Guessing"	
Greylan James	2023	"2 Years Back"	Hit songwriter (multiple No. 1s)
Lauren Watkins	2023	"Shirley Temple"	
Austin Snell	2023	"Excuse the Mess"	
The Castellows	2024	"No. 7 Road"	
Lakeview	2024	"Home Team"	
Ryan and Rory	2024	"Pour Decisions"	
Hudson Westbrook	2025	"House Again"	
Brandon Wisham	2025	"Growin' Up"	
Lanie Gardner	2025	"Buzzkill"	
Blake Whiten	2026	"Break Me"	
Stella Lefty	2026	"Boston"	
