= Cam Brainard =

American actor (born 1962)

Cam "Buzz" Brainard
- Born: Cameron Duane Brainard; May 21, 1962 (age 64); Clio, Michigan, U.S.
- Education: Central Michigan University
- Occupations: Voice-over artist, broadcaster, host
- Years active: 1986–present
- Television: Disney Channel; This Week in Baseball; Travel Channel; Laff; Maximum Exposure
- Spouse: Sandy Brainard
- Children: 1

Cam "Buzz" Brainard (born Cameron Duane Brainard; May 21, 1962) is an American voice actor, narrator and radio personality. He is best known for hosting "The Music Row Happy Hour" on SiriusXM's The Highway, and for having been the long-time announcer for Disney Channel.

== Career ==
=== Voice-over talent ===
As a voice talent, Brainard is known as the main announcer for the Disney Channel from 2000 to 2017. He first gained notoriety as the "smart aleck" narrator with a cult-following on the syndicated television show Maximum Exposure, also known as "Max X" which ran for two seasons from 2000 to 2002. As a sports announcer, Brainard hosted "This Week In Baseball" on FOX (taking over for the late Mel Allen) from 2000 until the show ended its run after more than 30 years in 2011. He also narrated Breed All About It for Animal Planet and was the promo voice for the TV series Friends in syndication.

Currently, Brainard is the voice of television's "World Access" on the Travel Channel, as well as many television and radio commercials. Audiences also hear his voice on more than 500 radio stations in the U.S. and Canada and growing. His formats range from AC to Hot AC, Christian Radio to Country and from Rock to Adult Hits.

Since 2017, he has been the announcer for rhythm game StepManiaX.

He is also currently the announcer for the Laff TV network and Romedy Now, which airs in India.

=== SiriusXM The Highway ===
Brainard has one of the largest daily audiences of any country music radio personality in North America, as the weekday afternoon host on "The Highway," SiriusXM radio's new country channel 56 based in Nashville. As of Winter 2014, Sirius XM had 27 million subscribers. Brainard has been a CMA Award (Country Music Association) and ACM nominee for National Broadcast Personality of the Year.

With a weekly live audience, Buzz Brainard hosts the "Music Row Happy Hour" on SiriusXM The Highway most Friday afternoons from Jimmy Buffett's Margaritaville Cafe in downtown Nashville. He is credited with discovering a number of country music hitmakers. As host of the weekly SiriusXM music discovery program "On The Horizon," Brainard showcases unsigned and up-and-coming country artists.

Los Angeles radio audiences were the first to hear "Buzz Brainard" as co-host of the Morning show on KZLA-FM. Later, he hosted the syndicated "Music City Saturday Night" show and "GAC Nights Radio" live from Nashville.

Brainard was providing coverage of the Route 91 Harvest festival, in which he escaped the 2017 Las Vegas Shooting.

== Personal life ==
Brainard was raised in Clio, Michigan. After graduating from Clio High School, he attended Central Michigan University. He worked as an actor and voice over artist in New York City, then Los Angeles. He now lives and plays golf almost every weekend in Nashville, Tennessee.

== Filmography ==
=== Film ===
Year	Title	Role	Notes
1994	Clear and Present Danger	Coast Guardsman #1	
1995	The Net	Computer Technician	
1997	Face/Off	Dispatcher	

=== Television ===
Year	Title	Role	Notes
1992	Homefront	Peach	Episode: "Getting to First Base"
1994	A Place for Annie	Medical Student	TV movie
1994	Sonic the Hedgehog	Rotor	13 episodes
1995	One West Waikiki	Charles Meadows	Episode: "Unhappily Ever After"
1997	Runaway Car	Ray	TV movie
1997	NightMan	Dr. Stone	TV movie; credited as Cam "Buzz" Brainard
1997–1998	Night Man	Dr. Stone	2 episodes; credited as Cam "Buzz" Brainard
1997–2001	Breed All About It	Narrator	
2000–2002	Maximum Exposure	Narrator	Credited as "Smart-Aleck Announcer Dude"
2000	The Wild Thornberrys	TV Emcee	Episode: "Time Flies"
2006	What's the Word?	Announcer	

=== Video Game ===
Year	Title	Role	Notes
2017	StepManiaX	Announcer	
