= Digital content =

Content that exists in digital data form

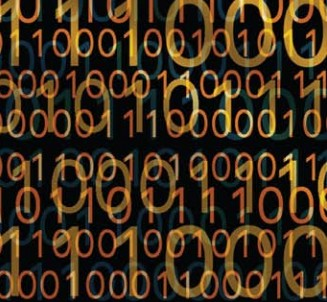
Binary code represents text or computer processor instructions that create digital content.

Digital content is any content that exists in the form of digital data. Digital content is stored on digital media or analog storage in specific formats. Forms of digital content include information that is digitally broadcast, streamed, or contained in computer files. Viewed narrowly, digital content includes popular media types, while a broader approach considers any type of digital information (e. g. digitally updated weather forecasts, GPS maps, and so on) as digital content.

Digital content has increased as more households have accessed the Internet. Expanded access has made it easier for people to receive their news and watch TV online, challenging the popularity of traditional platforms. Increased access to the Internet has also led to the mass publication of digital content through individuals in the form of eBooks, blog posts, and even Facebook posts.

== History ==
At the beginning of the Digital Revolution, computers facilitated the discovery, retrieval, and creation of new information in every field of human knowledge. As information became increasingly more accessible, the Digital Revolution also facilitated the creation of digital content. Despite an evolution to digital technology, which occurred somewhere between the late 1970s, distribution of digital content did not begin until the late 1990s with the rise in popularity of the Internet.

In the past, digital content was primarily distributed through computers and the Internet. Methods of distribution are rapidly changing as the Digital Revolution brings new channels, such as mobile apps and eBooks. These new technologies will create challenges for content creators, as they determine the best channel to bring content to their consumers.

Despite the benefits, new technologies have created new intellectual property issues. Users can easily share, modify, and redistribute content outside of the creator's control. While new technologies have made digital content available to large audiences, managing copyright and limiting content movement will continue to be an issue that digital content creators face in the future.

== Types of digital content ==
Examples include:

- Video – Types of video content include home videos, music videos, TV shows, and movies. Many of these can be viewed on websites such as YouTube, Hulu, Paramount+, Disney+, HBO Max, and so on, in which people and companies alike can post content. However, many movies and television shows are not available for free legally, but rather can be purchased from sites such as iTunes and Amazon.
- Audio – Music is the most common form of audio. Spotify has emerged as a popular way for people to listen to music either over the Internet or from their computer desktop. Digital content in the form of music is also available through Pandora and last.fm, both of which allow listeners to listen to music online for no charge.
- Images – Photo and image sharing is another example of digital content. Popular sites used for this type of digital content includes Imgur, where people share self-created pictures, Flickr, where people share their photo albums, and DeviantArt, where people share their artwork. Popular apps that are used for images include Instagram and Snapchat.
- Visual Stories - Stories are a new type of digital content that got introduced by Snapchat. Since then, stories as a format has been introduced in a couple of other platforms such as Facebook and Linkedin. In 2018, Google introduced their AMP Stories, which provides content publishers with a mobile-focused format for delivering news and information as visually rich, tap-through stories.
- Text - Type of digital content which is available in text or written format. Blog websites which store data in form of textual format.

=== Paid digital content ===
In order to have access to more premium digital goods, consumers usually have to pay an upfront charge for digital content, or a subscription based fee.

- Video – Many licensed videos, such as movies and television shows, require money in order to be viewed or downloaded. Popular services used by many include streaming giant Netflix and Amazon's streaming service, as well as recent notice put forth by the online video platform YouTube.
- Audio – While songs can be streamed for free, generally in order to download most licensed music, consumers need to purchase songs from web stores, such as the popular iTunes. However, Spotify Premium is emerging as a new model for purchasing digital content on the web: consumers pay a monthly fee to unlimited streaming and downloading from Spotify's music library.

According to a report done by IHS Inc. in 2013, the global consumer spending on digital content grew to over $57 billion in 2013, which was up almost 30% from $44 billion in 2012. In past years, the US has always been a leader in consumer expenditure on digital content, but as of 2013, many countries have emerged with great consumer expenditure. South Korea's overall digital spend per capita is now greater than the US.

==== Consolidation ====
According to research firm Ampere Analysis, in 2024, a small group of six media conglomerates; Disney, Comcast, Google, Warner Bros. Discovery, Netflix, and Paramount Global—are poised to dominate the global content market. These companies are projected to account for 51% of all global spending on content, a significant increase from 47% in 2020.

Disney, in particular, is a major player, with an estimated $35.8 billion investment in television and film content, representing 14% of global spending. This significant increase, fueled by Disney's full ownership of Hulu, highlights the company's strategic focus on streaming services. A substantial portion of the projected $126 billion global content spending is allocated to streaming platforms.

=== Non-purchasable digital content ===
Not all digital content is purchasable, and is simply anything published digitally. This would include:

- News – in recent years newspapers have attempted to expand their readership by creating access to their newspapers digitally. As of 2012, 39% of readers learned about news from online formats, making news a prevalent form of digital content.
- Advertisements – as media consumers increasingly use digital formats to watch TV, check the weather, and search for content, advertisements have shifted to digital forms to keep up with their viewership. Advertisements are now being made digitally and placed on sites ranging from Facebook to YouTube.
- Question and Answer sites – these sites are a type of Internet forum where people can post questions they want answered, or provide responses to previous inquiries. With millions of questions posted each day, anyone has the ability to create content on these sites, so the information provided may not be 100% reliable or accurate. Popular sites include Yahoo! Answers, WikiAnswers and Quora.
- Web mapping – sites such as MapQuest and Google Maps provide users with map content. These sites give people the ability to quickly look up the location of a landmark and create routes to a destination. Online maps are a form of free content provided by companies such as Google and AOL, serving as much more efficient alternatives to the traditional Thomas Guide.

== Business implications ==
=== Digital companies ===
Digital content businesses can include news, information, and entertainment distributed over the Internet and consumed digitally by both consumers and businesses. Based on revenue, the leading digital businesses are ranked Google, China Mobile, Bloomberg, Reed Elsevier, and Apple. The 50 companies with the highest revenue are split between those offering free and paid digital content, but these top 50 companies combined generate revenue of $150 billion.

=== Educational opportunities ===
Programs such as CUNY's Macaulay Honors College in their New Media Lab, run by industry professional Robert Small, is set up to train and introduce students to the various disciplines within the digital content industry. The goal is to offer information and access to professional work opportunities. They also explore within an incubator how to create businesses and start ups within the world of digital content. There are many educational events in support of choosing digital content as a career.

=== Government support ===
The Irish government adopted a "Strategy for the Digital Content Industry in Ireland" in 2002.

== See also ==
- Digital economy
- Digital marketing
- Paid content
- User-generated content
