= Extreme Dinosaurs =

American animated television series

- Genre: Action/Adventure; Science fantasy
- Created by: Louis Gassin
- Developed by: Martha Moran
- Directed by: Rich Trueblood
- Starring: Jacques Bourassa; Garry Chalk; Marcy Goldberg; Jason Gray-Stanford; Terry Klassen; Blu Mankuma; Cusse Mankuma; Scott McNeil; Lee Tockar; Louise Vallance; Sam Vincent
- Composer: Matt McGuire
- Country of origin: United States
- Original language: English
- No. of seasons: 1
- No. of episodes: 52

Production
- Executive producers: Allen J. Bohbot; Kaaren Lee Brown; Andy Heyward; Robby London; Michael Maliani; Ralph J. Sorrentino
- Producer: Kurt Weldon
- Animators: P&A Animation Production; Hong Ying Animation; Young Woo Production; Philippine Animation Studio
- Editors: Theresa Gilroy-Nielsen; Mark Deimel; Miriam Priessel; Mike DePatie; Warren Taylor; Gayle McIntire; Paul De Cham
- Running time: 22 min
- Production companies: DIC Productions, L.P. Bohbot Entertainment

Original release
- Network: Syndication (Bohbot Kids Network)
- Release: September 1 – December 24, 1997

Related
- Street Sharks

Extreme Dinosaurs
- Type: Action figure
- Company: Mattel

Extreme Dinosaurs is an American animated series produced by DIC Productions, L.P. and Bohbot Entertainment in 1997 based on a 1996 toyline from Mattel. This show is a spin-off of Street Sharks (where they first appeared as the Dino Vengers).

The show is in the same vein as Teenage Mutant Ninja Turtles and Jurassic Park. Extreme Dinosaurs was broadcast in syndication as part of Bohbot Entertainment's Bohbot Kids Network block where it aired for one season in 1997. The show was cancelled after 52 episodes.

== Plot ==
The series starred a Tyrannosaurus, a Triceratops, a Stegosaurus, and a Pteranodon that were transformed into super warriors by an inter-dimensional criminal named Argor Zardok. They rebelled against the alien criminal and battle with Argor's second group of warriors known as the evil Raptors. Eventually, the Raptors' objective is to cause global warming by increasing the Earth's temperature to suit themselves, not caring the humans shall suffer from global warming.

== Characters ==
=== Extreme Dinosaurs ===
- T-Bone (voiced by Scott McNeil) is a Tyrannosaurus and the team's leader who is usually attentive to the primary objective even where the others are distracted. T-Bone is light yellow and wears black boots (wherein one of his claws protrudes through both boots), dark green pants, and shoulder pads. His signature move, which he can perform alone or with any in the group, is the "Saurian Stomp" which shakes the local ground.
- Spike (voiced by Cusse Mankuma) is a Triceratops with one broken horn who is the Extreme Dinosaurs' martial arts expert and the residential chef. Spike is iceberg blue with a dark purple under his tail and wears brown shorts, brown leg bands, a yellow belt, and is always barefoot. Despite his eagerness to fight, he tends a garden in his free time.
- Stegz (voiced by Sam Vincent) is a Stegosaurus who is the team's technological specialist and the most contemplative of the four. Stegz is apple green and wears purple shorts and black boots. He can curl his body into a destructive saw blade, using the plates on his back as its cutting edge.
- Bullzeye (voiced by Jason Gray-Stanford) is a wise-cracking Pteranodon whose chief weapon is a shriek of ear-splitting frequency. Bullzeye is maroon red and wears yellow pants, black boots (which his claws protrude through), and a gold necklace. Bullzeye is lazy and given to impulse buying.
- Hard Rock (voiced by Blu Mankuma) is an Ankylosaurus from an alternate reality inhabited by mutated dinosaurs. Hard Rock is tan and wears red pants with grey boots. After helping them against the Raptors, Hard Rock joined the Extreme Dinosaurs. He is the principal pacifist.

=== Allies ===
- Porcupine Duvall (voiced by Garry Chalk) is a paleontologist and owner of a private Dinosaur Museum in New Mexico which the Extreme Dinosaurs inhabit as their lair.
- Prince H (voiced by Jacques Bourassa) is the Prince of England who sometimes helps the Extreme Dinosaurs with some missions. He is loosely based on Prince Harry, Duke of Sussex.
- Ridge (voiced by Scott McNeil) is a dinosaur of unknown species (possibly Dilophosaurus) who fights as champion in an intergalactic fighting arena.
- The Skelesaurs are a group of four dinosaur skeletons of the team's species. They appear in the episode "Bones of Contention". At first, they are against the Extreme Dinosaurs, but after merging into Megasaur, they become allies of the team.

=== Raptors ===
The Velociraptors (or Raptors) are the archenemies of the Extreme Dinosaurs determined to conquer Earth or to change its climate by global warming to fit their comfort:

- Bad Rap (voiced by Garry Chalk) is the leader of the Raptors. He is orange with yellow stripe tail and a metal brace-like device attached to his mouth. He briefly had a weapon on one hand that dissolved solid matter effortlessly, but is later replaced by a rocket-launcher. Bad Rap wears a yellow strap over his torso and waist and black shorts. His goal is to permanently alter the Earth's biosphere to closely resemble the Mesozoic. In "The Dinosaur Prophecy", Bad Rap briefly developed a super-powered alter ego named Abysmal Rap.
- Haxx (voiced by Lee Tockar) is a mahogany Raptor with implants on the backs of each wrist that produce green blades. His tail has been replaced with a blade that is capable of spinning like a drill. Haxx is set back by his low intelligence. He wears pink shorts.
- Spittor (voiced by Terry Klassen) is the brains of the Raptors. He is mulberry-purple with white on his neck, chest and feet. Spittor wears no clothing and carries a tank of various liquids released from nozzles on his hands, tail, and mouth.
- Cyber-Raptors are robot versions of Raptors built by Spittor to use as foot soldiers against the Extreme Dinosaurs. They first appeared in the episode "Cyber Raptors".

=== Quadrainians ===
The Quadrainians are a race of blue-skinned humanoids from the largely unseen Quadrainia:

- Chedra Bodzak (voiced by Louise Vallance) is a female law officer stranded on Earth alongside the Extreme Dinosaurs and distinguished by constant reference to a "Codebook" containing the laws of her society. She serves as a mentor to the Dinosaurs and as a comic foil when they transgress her book's edicts.
- Argor Zardok (voiced by Terry Klassen) is a wanted criminal from Quadrainia who arrives on Earth in the Mesozoic and transforms most of the principal characters into his personal soldiers. He ended up causing the K-T Event by equipping Bad Rap with a supremely-powerful weapon.

=== Other villains ===
The following are the villains that the Extreme Dinosaurs fight outside of Argor Zardok and the Raptors:

- Queen Zarconda (voiced by Kathleen Barr) is the queen of an alien world in "Colloso-Dome" who kidnaps T-Bone, Spike, and Stegz to satisfy her amusement.
  - Gort (voiced by Terry Klassen) is a Queen Zarconda's right-hand man.
- Dr. Rebecca Scarwell (voiced by Marcy Goldberg) is a secretive scientist in Roswell researching mutations and extraterrestrials, who captures the Extreme Dinosaurs more than once.
- Peter Benning (voiced by Sam Vincent) is a paleontologist determined to capture the Extreme Dinosaurs and Raptors for fame and glory.
- Count Alexander von Skullheim (voiced by David Sobolov) is a nefarious criminal who appears in "Agent Double-'O' Dinosaur".
- General Amadi (voiced by Alec Willows) is an unbalanced general who appears in "Raptorian Crude".
- John Rathbone is a hunter who appears in "Safari-Saurus".
- Dr. Monstromo is a mad scientist residing on his private island who appears in "The Mysterious Island of Dr. Monstromo". He plotted to use the DNA of the Extreme Dinosaurs and the Raptors to make an army of vicious predators.
  - Griffin is a part-eagle part-lion creation of Dr. Monstromo.

=== Other characters ===
- Nigel Moorehead (voiced by Garry Chalk)
- Dylan (voiced by Andrew Francis)
- Ditto is Stegz's pet ostrich who was hatched from an egg which Badrap mistook for a Velociraptor egg.
- Dr. Morales (voiced by Lee Tockar) is a scientist who appears in the episode "Raptoroid".
- Scolder and Mully (voiced by Garry Chalk and Kathleen Barr) are FBI agents. They are parodies of Fox Mulder and Dana Scully of The X-Files.

== Episodes ==
| No. | Title | Written by | Original release date | Prod. code |
|---|---|---|---|---|
| 1 | "Out of Time" | Robert Askin, Reed Shelly | September 1, 1997 | 277-101 |
A wanted criminal from Quadrainia named Argor Zardok appears in Earth's past 65 million years ago and transformed some dinosaurs into mutated creatures with sentient intelligence. Bad Rap is given a Quadrainian weapon, which he used to inadvertently cause the extinction of the dinosaurs. The Extreme Dinosaurs and Raptors are able to escape certain death thanks to a Quadranian enforcer named Chedra Bodzak. Both the Extreme Dinosaurs and Raptors slept for the next 65 million years to awake in modern times.
| 2 | "Fossil Fooled" | Jeff Kwitny | September 2, 1997 | 277-102 |
Bad Rap and the rest of the Raptors are dissatisfied with Earth's climate. They plan to cause global warming to raise Earth's temperature to make it more comfortable for them. The Extreme Dinosaurs are determined to stop the Raptors in meeting their goals. Bad Rap's first idea to cause global warming is to set the world's oil fields on fire, releasing more CO2 into the Earth's atmosphere.
| 3 | "Ick-thysaurus Vacation" | Gildart Jackson | September 3, 1997 | 277-103 |
The Extreme Dinosaurs go to Mexico only to be lured by the Raptors into a trap. T-Bone, Spike, and Stegz are captured by Becky Scarwell and taken to Roswell to be examined. Bullzeye was the only one not to be taken and goes to Roswell to free his friends. The Raptors discover a nest of eggs, and Bad Rap is convinced they are raptor eggs.
| 4 | "Inevitable Eggztinction" | Elizabeth Stonecipher | September 4, 1997 | 277-104 |
Bad Rap is confident that the eggs they discovered are raptor eggs. His hope is for them to be hatched so he could raise an army of raptors to take over the world. The Extreme Dinosaurs plan to capture the Raptors, but the Raptors are able to avoid being captured and take over a nuclear military base to continue incubating the eggs. Bad Rap at the end learns that the eggs are really ostrich eggs and quickly abandons his plans.
| 5 | "Raptoroid" | Doug Molitor | September 5, 1997 | 277-107 |
A huge asteroid is coming toward the Earth. If it were to hit, the Earth will be pushed into an orbit closer to the sun, causing temperatures to rise. The Raptors kidnap a scientist, the only man who has access to a top secret super laser that could effectively blow up the asteroid in space and save the world.
| 6 | "Bullzeye Surfs the Web" | Dennis O'Flaherty | September 8, 1997 | 277-109 |
Stegz sends out a intergalactic signal to contact other dinosaurs. The Raptors are able to pick up the signal and lure the Extreme Dinosaurs into a trap. Meanwhile, Bullzeye buys a device from the home shopping channel that could view websites in 3D. A freak electrical discharge from Stegz's communication device hits Bullzeye, giving him the ability to cause anything to appear just by thinking about it. Bullzeye learns the other Extreme Dinosaurs were captured by the Raptors and uses his new superpower to free his friends and defeat the Raptors.
| 7 | "Saurian Sniffles" | Jules Dennis | September 9, 1997 | 277-106 |
The Raptors go to a chemical depot with a highly reactive material that will super-heat on contact with sunlight. Their plan was thawed by the Extreme Dinosaurs early on, but still they were determined to go back for the chemical. Bad Rap and the Raptors go to a natural history museum to steal amber with mosquitoes from the dinosaur era. These mosquitoes have the Jurassic Flu, which the Raptors hope will make the Extreme Dinosaurs too sick to fight.
| 8 | "Jurassic Art" | Jeff Kwitny | September 10, 1997 | 277-118 |
The Raptors have a magnetic amplifier which they attach to the Eiffel Tower. This will cause the effects of the electromagnetism to be increased, enough to change the Earth's polar axis. Meanwhile, Spittor is hailed as a great new artistic discovery after accidentally spraying green slime on a wall in the Louvre.
| 9 | "Mission Implausible" | Greg Johnson | September 11, 1997 | 277-108 |
The Raptors recruit a human hacker to infiltrate a military control outpost, giving them control of nuclear submarines, which they intend to use to trigger five undersea volcanoes. With the help of Prince H, the Extreme Dinosaurs need to disrupt the Raptors' control before the submarines launch.
| 10 | "Cyber-Raptors" | Michael Maurer | September 12, 1997 | 277-113 |
Peter Benning, still obsessed with capturing the Extreme Dinosaurs, lures them into a high-tech dinosaur amusement park, but the Raptors discover this plan and take over the park, pitting the Dinosaurs against its automatons, including their own brand of "Cyber-Raptors".
| 11 | "Loch Ness Mess" | Ken Pontac | September 15, 1997 | 277-110 |
The Raptors attempt to manipulate the Loch Ness Monster – a surviving plesiosaur – into helping them destroy the Extreme Dinosaurs. While visiting the loch to investigate, the Dinosaurs are themselves mistaken for a type of Nessie.
| 12 | "Dialing for Dinosaurs" | Douglas Booth | September 16, 1997 | 277-112 |
Bad Rap and the Raptors have been stealing hard drives, and while T-Bone and the others try to apprehend them, Bullzeye gets distracted by a commercial, causing him to fail his mission. Bullzeye gets a pep talk about his distraction, and must be reminded that watching television during a mission just does not mix. Meanwhile, Stegz is trying to find the name of the company that the hard drives were stolen from.
| 13 | "There's No Place Like Dome" | Temple Mathews | September 17, 1997 | 277-119 |
The Raptors have decided to resettle into a bio-dome, a place with an artificially-controlled environment made for rare endangered plants, some of which are on the brink of extinction. They set the controlled temperature to be just right for them, endangering the rare plants in return. The Extreme Dinosaurs are called to evict the Raptors from the bio-dome to help save the plants.
| 14 | "Raptorian Crude" | Douglas Booth | September 18, 1997 | 277-115 |
The Dinosaurs investigate a water plant giving off a mysterious glow on the satellite signal. The Raptors are the suspects of the matter yet again, and Spittor's new invention, "liquid lightning", could be the undoing of the Extreme Dinosaurs, or worse, the whole human race.
| 15 | "The Rulebook of Love" | Ken Pontac, David Bleiman | September 19, 1997 | 277-120 |
The Raptors use Chedra's love of strategy, law and order against the Extreme Dinosaurs so they can acquire the necessary chemicals to assemble and use an ozone bomb.
| 16 | "Monstersaurus Truckadon" | David Schneider, Drew Daywalt | September 22, 1997 | 277-105 |
Spike splits from the team because of his hot-headed nature to fight after he had a crude battle with the Raptors which they end up escaping from. He joins up with a wrestling agent and decides to battle it out with machines. The Raptors decide to build the ultimate fighting machine to bring Spike's new career – and Spike himself – to an end.
| 17 | "The Incredible Shrinking Dinosaurs" | Matt Uitz | September 23, 1997 | 277-116 |
When the Raptors steal a drone aircraft and try to defoliate the rain forests – in hopes that it will speed global warming – the Extreme Dinosaurs set out to stop them. It turns out to be a much bigger task than they expect, when a freak accident temporarily shrinks them to the size of insects.
| 18 | "Lunar Toons" | Chris Ord, Matt Corman | September 24, 1997 | 277-114 |
The Raptors hijack a rocket leading to the moon. The Extreme Dinosaurs learn that the Raptors have hijacked it from a news report, and suspect the Raptors are after a device that may cause global warming.
| 19 | "Have a Nice Daynosaur" | Robert Askin | September 25, 1997 | 277-121 |
Upon finding Argor's cruiser, T-Bone, Spike, and the Raptors end up in an alternate dimension inhabited by mutated dinosaurs and a female Quadranian. The Raptors use their Aggression Activator device to turn the local raptors to their side. With the help of an inhabitant named Hard Rock, T-Bone and Spike must thwart the Raptors before they convert all the raptors on this world to their side.
| 20 | "Bones of Contention" | Barry Hawkins | September 26, 1997 | 277-123 |
The skeletons of four dinosaurs, unearthed by a Florida construction company, come to life and go on a rampage through Downtown Miami. The Extreme Dinosaurs try to stop them, but when they have been smashed, these "Skelesaurs" reassemble themselves into one enormous "Megasaur". To make things worse, the Raptors have unleashed a new and even meaner generation of Cyber-Raptors.
| 21 | "The Bad Seed" | Douglas Booth | September 29, 1997 | 277-124 |
The Raptors have caused New York City to be overrun by gigantic mutant vegetation: plants that release ozone-destroying fluorocarbons instead of oxygen. The Extreme Dinosaurs must get to the root of the problem before the plants destroy New York and the ozone layer.
| 22 | "Earth Vs. The Flying Raptors" | Michael Maurer | September 30, 1997 | 277-127 |
After watching too many bad science fiction movies, Bad Rap hits on the perfect scheme to wrest control of the Earth from the humans: steal a flying saucer (from Becky Scarwell's Roswell installation) and stage his own alien invasion. When the Extreme Ones try to foil Bad Rap's scheme, the Dinosaurs and the Raptors discover that the real aliens have arrived, looking for their missing saucer and its crew.
| 23 | "Rebels Without a Clue" | Temple Mathews | October 1, 1997 | 277-111 |
The Raptors steal a weapon from a faulty-weapon storage facility in yet another attempt to cause global warming. They kidnap a scientist to help them fix the weapon. The Extreme Dinosaurs must stop the Raptors and rescue the scientist in time to catch up with the biker-movie marathon on TV.
| 24 | "Day of the Condorsaurus" | Elizabeth Stonecipher | October 2, 1997 | 277-130 |
Bullzeye gets hit in the head and loses his memory. He thinks he is a condor and befriends a woman at a condor sanctuary until his memory returns. The Raptors uses a sonic device to drive away humans from a tropical island. They buy the island for cheap due to its unsuitability for humans. Bad Rap is hoping to conquer other warm tropical places with the sonic device.
| 25 | "The Dinosaur Prophecy" | Temple Mathews | October 3, 1997 | 277-122 |
Bad Rap and his gang are after a stone tablet that is said to predict the future of dinosaurs. The temple that contains the tablet has also an object that grants its possessor tremendous power. The Extreme Dinosaurs are caught between stopping the Raptors' plans and a trap that was set up against them by an old foe.
| 26 | "The Raptor Who Would Be King" | Douglas Booth | October 6, 1997 | 277-128 |
Bad Rap conspires with a queen-wannabe to overthrow the rightful Queen and replace her with her husband. The Extreme Dinosaurs set out to thwart their plans and protect their royal friend Prince H.
| 27 | "The Return of Argor" | Dennis O'Flaherty | October 7, 1997 | 277-125 |
Bullzeye is haunted by Argor just before the latter makes his comeback after being in suspended animation for 65 million years. The Raptors are excited that their "dad" is coming back, but their excitement is short-lived.
| 28 | "Jealousaurus" | Peter Hunziker | October 8, 1997 | 277-129 |
Spike is jealous of Hard Rock after he steals his thunder during one of the Extreme Dinosaurs' skirmishes with the Raptors. In an attempt to prove himself, Spike goes after the Raptors alone, but he is sent and trapped in the Bermuda Triangle by their latest weapon. Spike must find a way back, and the Extreme Dinosaurs must help their buddy and bring him back for a surprise they have prepared for him.
| 29 | "Shrink Rap" | Gildart Jackson | October 9, 1997 | 277-117 |
Dr. Scarwell is back with a weapon that shrinks and "digitizes" objects. She tricks both teams to her base so that she can turn the dinosaurs and raptors into digital entities that could be uploaded and studied on a computer. The Extreme Dinosaurs escape her plans unharmed, while the Raptors are shrunk and transformed into a "pure information". Realizing that they could use the Internet to travel to any place and do anything, the Raptors attack power stations along the western seaboard of the U.S. to stop air-conditioning and ruin other electricity-based services. The Extreme Dinosaurs are up to the rescue, but not before doing some shrinking of their own.
| 30 | "Night of the Living Pumpkins" | Barry Hawkins | October 10, 1997 | 277-131 |
It is Halloween and the Extreme Dinosaurs are after the Raptors again. This time the Raptors are digging into a volcano to release lava and heat up the atmosphere. In their attempt to stop them, the Extreme Dinosaurs release a parasite that attacks and neutralizes the aggression center of the brain, which in turn infects them, causing them to become nice. The Extreme Dinosaurs' friends must cure them from the parasite so that they can stop the latest Raptors' plan.
| 31 | "A Few Good Dinosaurs" | Greg Johnson | October 13, 1997 | 277-133 |
The Raptors have kidnapped the G7 leaders in order to coerce them into signing pro-global warming contracts. The Extreme Dinosaurs and the recently retired Porcupine McVells' old sergeant must rescue them and put an end to the Raptors' plan.
| 32 | "Captain Pork" | Douglas Booth | October 14, 1997 | 277-134 |
Dr. Scarwell finds an alien ship with two aliens inside it. In her attempt to gain their intelligence, her body is controlled by the criminal alien, while Pork's body is controlled by the officer who is hunting the criminal. The Raptors use this opportunity to get on the criminal's good side in an attempt to control the world and heat it up.
| 33 | "Lights, Cameras, Raptors!" | Jules Dennis | October 15, 1997 | 277-132 |
Spittor manages to create S.A.P., a powerful corrosive liquid which can melt metal and bedrock. Bad Rap plans to use the S.A.P. to create sinkholes that lead straight to the Earth's molten core in order to heat up the Earth's surface. They need access to a certain tar pit in Los Angeles to make more S.A.P., so Bad Rap decides to make a movie as cover for their operations. The Extreme Dinosaurs crash their film in order to stop their plans and neutralize the dangerous liquid.
| 34 | "Enter the Dinosaur" | Jeff Kwitny | October 16, 1997 | 277-136 |
Bullzeye and Hard Rock learn the secrets of Aikido from Master Karma Tupjuk, whose amazing martial arts skills let him perform superhuman feats. The two Dinosaurs must use their new moves to protect their friend's Tibetan sanctuary from the Raptors, who want to exploit Tupjik's powers for their own nefarious ends.
| 35 | "The Weresaur" | Ken Pontiac, David Bleiman | October 17, 1997 | 277-137 |
Miners of Transylvania are being haunted by a "Weresaur", forcing the Extreme Dinosaurs to investigate, but it could lead to Bad Rap or bad results.
| 36 | "Jinxed" | Eleanor Burian-Mohr | October 20, 1997 | 277-135 |
Bullzeye's new obsession – calling Madame Woolenska's Psychic Hotline for advice – has left him convinced that he is jinxed. When T-Bone, Spike and Stegz are captured by Dr. Scarwell, Bullzeye thinks it is all his fault. It is up to Madam Woolenska (who only told Bullzeye he was jinxed as part of an elaborate publicity stunt) to lift the curse in time for Bullzeye to save his friends.
| 37 | "Tiptoe Through the Tulips" | Douglas Booth | October 21, 1997 | 277-138 |
While battling the Dinosaurs, the Raptors stumble into a greenhouse laboratory and are accidentally sprayed with an experimental growth hormone that causes them to grow to enormous size. The Extreme Dinosaurs must figure out how to cut Bad Rap down to size before the giant Raptors can carry out their plan to cover the North Atlantic sea with burning oil.
| 38 | "Cliff Notes" | Eric Luke | October 22, 1997 | 277-142 |
When a small plane carrying a brilliant scientist and his latest invention – a new type of engine that could cause catastrophic global warming – makes an emergency landing in the mountains, the Extreme Dinosaurs must find them before the Raptors do. A series of disasters, as well as some traps laid by Spittor, however, cause the Dinosaurs to become separated, forcing Stegz to find a way to take on all the Raptors alone.
| 39 | "Colosso-Dome" | Michael Maurer | October 27, 1997 | 277-139 |
The Extreme Dinosaurs are captured by an alien spacecraft and taken to the planet Krat, where the tyrannical Queen Zarconda forces them to compete in her gladiator arena, the Colosso-Dome. The Extreme Dinosaurs must do battle with Queen Zarconda's champion – a tough Dilophosaurus named Ridge – and find a way to bring the house down on the Colosso-Dome.
| 40 | "Dinosaur Warriors" | Michael Maurer | October 28, 1997 | 277-140 |
After destroying the Colosso-Dome (from episode 39), the Extreme Dinosaurs and Ridge join forces with Krat's heroic rebels to overthrow Queen Zarconda and restore freedom to their world and find a starship so the Extreme Ones can make it home.
| 41 | "Surfasaur's Up" | Peter Hunziker | October 29, 1997 | 277-147 |
The Raptors stage a phony costumed surfing contest to lure the Extreme Dinosaurs into a trap; as soon as the Dinosaurs are in the water, Spittor uses his sonic disruptors to create a massive tsunami to wash them away so there will be no one to stop the Raptors from setting off every volcano in the Pacific.
| 42 | "Agent Double-'O' Dinosaur" | Douglas Booth | November 10, 1997 | 277-144 |
T-Bone goes undercover to stop the nefarious criminal Count Alexander von Skullheim from holding the world hostage with a stolen top-secret satellite weapon. To bring von Skullheim to justice, T-Bone must infiltrate the villain's castle, evade its network of fiendish traps, and single-handedly battle the Raptors, who want von Skullheim's satellite for themselves.
| 43 | "Salsafied" | Robert Askin | November 11, 1997 | 277-148 |
While visiting Mexico, the Extreme Dinosaurs discover an ultra-hot purple chili pepper, which Spike uses to create his hottest salsa ever for a salsa contest in Texas. His secret chilies have been genetically engineered by the Raptors to turn everyone who eats them into living furnaces.
| 44 | "T-Foot" | Michael Maurer | November 17, 1997 | 277-145 |
Afflicted by temporary amnesia from Spittor's Neural Neutralizer, T-Bone wanders the countryside and befriends a young boy who is convinced the heroic T. rex is actually Bigfoot. T-Bone must regain his memory in time to stop the Raptors from using the Neural Neutralizer to make his friends their brainwashed servants.
| 45 | "Zogwalla-con" | Douglas Booth | November 18, 1997 | 277-146 |
The Extreme Dinosaurs go to a science fiction convention to meet the director of a movie series starring Bullzeye's favorite giant monster, Zogwalla. Bullzeye's dream-come-true quickly turns into a nightmare when the Raptors commandeer the movie's robotic Zogwalla, and take the enormous "monster" on a rampage through Los Angeles.
| 46 | "Safari-Saurus" | Gildart Jackson | November 24, 1997 | 277-141 |
The Dinosaurs face off against John Rathbone, an unscrupulous big game hunter who captures rare, endangered animals and puts them on display in his private zoo. When the Endangered Ones try to put a stop to his operation, he adds them to his collection. The Dinosaurs must free Rathbone's menagerie and keep the Raptors from getting their claws on Rathbone's Biostasis Projector.
| 47 | "Sir Gus and the Dragon" | Jules Dennis | November 25, 1997 | 277-150 |
After being ambushed by the Raptors, Bullzeye is forced to take refuge in a cave near the Scottish coast, where he meets a young boy who thinks Bullzeye is a dragon. With the boy's help, Bullzeye must rejoin his friends in time to set a trap for the Raptors, who think that the area's legendary "dragon treasure" is actually a cache of equipment left by more of Argor's intelligent Velociraptor's.
| 48 | "The Extreme Files" | David Bleiman, Ken Pontac | December 1, 1997 | 277-149 |
Top FBI agents Mully and Scolder come to Pork's museum investigating the mysterious disappearance of the passengers of a jumbo jet Pork was traveling on. Suspecting Dr. Becky Scarwell is involved, the Extreme Dinosaurs and Chedra must form a reluctant alliance with Mully and Scolder to infiltrate Roswell and find out what really happened to Pork and the other passengers.
| 49 | "A Bone to Pick" | Elizabeth Stonecipher | December 2, 1997 | 277-152 |
After a battle with the Dinosaurs in Australia, the Raptors make off with a native artifact – a "talking" dinosaur bone – thinking it is a channel to other dimensions. The Extreme Dinosaurs and Chedra figure out that the bone is really picking up radio signals, and Bullzeye uses it to impersonate Argor Zardok, ordering the Raptors out to do a serious humiliatingly good deeds. When Bad Rap realizes the truth, however, the Dinosaurs have to stop him before he uses the powerful laser the Raptors have stolen to melt everything in sight.
| 50 | "The Mysterious Island of Dr. Monstromo" | Dennis O'Flaherty | December 8, 1997 | 277-143 |
The malevolent Dr. Monstromo lures the Raptors to his private island, hoping to use their DNA in his efforts to create an army of vicious predators. When the Dinosaurs show up hot on the Raptors' trail, Monstromo tries to capture them, hoping to add them to the mix. It is up to Hard Rock to defeat Monstromo's monstrous griffin and shut down Dr. Monstromo's lab before his friends fall victim to Dr. Monstromo's sinister plans.
| 51 | "Medusasaur" | Phil Harnage, Matt Uitz | December 9, 1997 | 277-151 |
Haxx becomes the leader of the Raptors when he gets his claws on a mysterious mask that turns anyone who looks at it to stone, and uses it to turn Bad Rap into a statue. The Extreme Dinosaurs must find a way to put the mask out of commission, and they have to stop Haxx and Spittor from making off with a fossilized Velociraptor egg, which they plan to clone into an army of Raptors.
| 52 | "Holiday on Ice" | Phil Harnage, Eleanor Burian-Mohr | December 24, 1997 | 277-126 |
Bad Rap sets out to blast the North Pole with stolen sonic disruptors, melting the polar ice cap. It is up to the Extreme Dinosaurs to stop him, and to help Pork's cynical 8-year-old nephew get what he really wants for Christmas.

== Development ==
Extreme Dinosaurs was a series of toys created by Mattel in 1996, as a spin-off of the Street Sharks toyline. The characters were first introduced under the name "Dino Vengers" in the third season of the Street Sharks cartoon, renamed Dino Vengers Featuring Street Sharks, where they were shown to be aliens from a distant galaxy. As Street Sharks was wrapping production, the decision was made to spin-off the characters into their own series, for which their backstory was changed, their voices were re-cast, and some characters were redesigned.

The show was first announced by Bohbot in December 1996, under the name Dangerous Dinosaurs. Karen Lee Brown of Bohbot deemed the series as being a cartoon that does not rely on weapons but having "enough action to intrigue kids". The show was originally planned as a weekly series.

== Merchandise ==
In August 1997, Bohbot signed deals with over 22 companies for merchandising, including Mattel (toys), Hallmark (cards), Fruit of the Loom (underwear) and Anchor Bay Entertainment (home video), although the toys launched prior to the show's launch in April. The launch was also promoted with a 'View & Win' promotion, where action figures and other licensed products were offered as prizes. Later in October, Bohbot signed a deal with Creative Mills and H.H. Cutler Company for clothing, including sets, coordinates and T-shirts.

In January 1998, Bohbot's international division BKN International signed UK and Australian home video deals with Carlton Video and Roadshow Entertainment respectively.

=== Home video ===
In October 1997, Anchor Bay Entertainment released two VHS releases of the series - "Out of Time" and "Ick-Thysaurus Vacation", each containing two episodes. The tapes were supplied with a $5 rebate offer for the other release. Two promotional tapes containing the episodes "Raptoroid" and "Bullzeye Surfs the Web" were also released, exclusively at Blockbuster stores.

In the UK, Carlton Home Entertainment released the series on many VHS volumes. "Out of Time" and "Ick-Thysaurus Vacation" were double-cassette releases each including the bonus episode on the standalone tape, while other releases included "Lunartoons", "Raptoroid", "Jurassic Art", "Cyber-Raptors", which had three episodes on one VHS.

Roadshow Entertainment released the series on VHS in Australia on the VHS volumes: "Ick-Thysaurus Vacation" and "Dinosaur Warriors". In 2006, Force Entertainment released the complete series over four single-disc DVD volumes. Each DVD volume included a single opening and closing sequence, with 13 episodes in production order.

Pidax Film released the first 13 episodes on DVD in Germany, with English and German audio, in April 2018, under license from Your Family Entertainment AG. This was followed up with three more volumes, released on June 22, August 31, and October 26, respectively, all together making up the complete series.

Under license from 41 Entertainment and Invincible Entertainment Partners, Discotek Media released the complete series on Blu-ray in 2024. Similar to their Street Sharks and Adventures of Sonic the Hedgehog releases, it was released as a standard-definition Blu-Ray.

== Future ==
Since the show ended in late 1997, the show has been made available on many streaming platforms such as Amazon Prime and Apple TV among other platforms.

In 2021, "Bad Rap Rising", a live action fan film based on the series and using animatronics was released on small streaming platforms. It has no official connection to the series as the series is now owned by 41 Entertainment.
