= Street Sharks =

- Also known as: Dino Vengers Featuring Street Sharks (season 3)
- Genre: Action/adventure; Superhero
- Created by: Phil Harnage; Martha Moran
- Developed by: Phil Harnage (season 1); Douglas Booth (season 2); Martha Moran (season 3)
- Directed by: Ron Myrick (season 1); Ron Harris (seasons 2–3)
- Starring: Terry Berner; Pam Carter; Garry Chalk; Ian James Corlett; Matt Hill; Jim Hoggatt; J. Michael Lee; Jason Michas; Doug Parker; Andrew Rannells; Lee Tockar; Tony Wike; D. Kevin Williams
- Theme music composer: Michael Benghiat; Lois Blaisch
- Composers: Reed Robbins; Geoff Levin; Bruce Gianiese
- Countries of origin: United States; Canada
- Original language: English
- No. of seasons: 3
- No. of episodes: 40

Production
- Executive producers: Allen Bohbot; Michael Maliani; Mark Freedman; Andy Heyward; Robby London
- Producer: Michael Maliani
- Running time: 22 minutes
- Production companies: DIC Productions, L.P. (Note: Animation outsourced to Plus One Animation, Rainbow Animation Group, Hong Ying Animation and Han Yang Animation.); Bohbot Entertainment

Original release
- Network: Syndication (Amazin' Adventures) (seasons 1–2); ABC (season 3)
- Release: September 7, 1994 – May 18, 1997

Related
- Extreme Dinosaurs

Street Sharks is an American animated television series about the adventures of crime-fighting human-shark hybrids. The series was produced by DIC Productions, L.P. and Bohbot Entertainment and was initially syndicated as part of the latter's Amazin' Adventures programming block. The show promoted a line of action figures by Mattel. The creators were David Siegel and Joe Galliani of Mr. Joe's Really Big Productions.

In 1996, the show was retitled Dino Vengers Featuring Street Sharks with the addition of an extraterrestrial team of Dinosaurs named the Dino Vengers, who were paired with the Street Sharks. The show also moved to ABC. The Dino Vengers would later receive their own short-lived spin-off, where they were renamed as the Extreme Dinosaurs.

The series features theme music by Michael Benghiat and Lois Blaisch. Additional songs were written by Megan Cavallari and David Goldsmith.

== Plot ==
A university professor named Dr. Robert Bolton and his partner Dr. Luther Paradigm create a machine known as the "gene-slammer" which is capable of changing aquatic animals into anthropomorphic hybrids by combining their DNA. In his attempt to prevent Paradigm from using this machine for personal power, Bolton is transformed into an unseen monstrosity but escapes. Later, Paradigm gives Bolton's four sons, John, Bobby, Clint, and Coop, the likeness of four different sharks. When Dr. Paradigm captures their friend Bends, the resulting "Street Sharks" rescue him, and the resulting battle causes Paradigm to be combined with piranha DNA (for which he is often nicknamed "Dr. Piranoid" by other characters). While the Street Sharks are known to enjoy eating hot dogs, hamburgers, and milkshakes, they have shown a disdain for pizza when they shoot down that suggestion to Bends and Lena Mack.

In subsequent episodes, Dr. Paradigm creates a variety of mutant animals to destroy the Street Sharks while attempting to persuade the inhabitants of their native metropolis of Fission City to imprison them. Of these mutant animals, a few sided with the Sharks themselves: namely, Rox, Moby Lick, Mantaman, and El Swordo.

The final season introduced the Dino Vengers, a group of extraterrestrial dinosaurs allied with the Street Sharks against their rivals in the Raptor Gang. When Dr. Paradigm wanted to get a sample of the Raptors' DNA to improve himself, they tricked him by giving him iguana DNA, which transforms him into "Dr. Iguanazoid" leading to him working with the Raptors, where they will reward him by correcting the DNA mistake they gave him. In the end, Paradigm is captured and imprisoned while the Raptor Gang leaves Earth.

The Dino Vengers later had their own series called Extreme Dinosaurs, in which they and the Raptors had different backgrounds.

== Characters ==
=== Bolton family ===
A screenshot from the first episode "Sharkbait". Clockwise from upper left: Jab, Streex, Big Slammu, Ripster.

- John Bolton/Ripster (voiced by Lee Tockar) is the smartest, the leader, and oldest of the four brothers who enjoys creating inventions. He has taken up most of his knowledge and skills from his father. He is also an avid pool player. John was transformed into a great white shark hybrid with the ability to able to bite through steel as well as having extrasensory abilities.
- Clint Bolton/Jab (voiced by Matt Hill) is the laziest of the Street Sharks, but enjoys boxing and appears to have some talent with mechanics. Clint was transformed into a hammerhead shark hybrid and uses his head as a battering ram.
- Robert "Bobby" Bolton Jr./Streex (voiced by Andrew Rannells) is a level-headed, cool, and self-proclaimed ladies' man. He is always shown wearing his rollerblades and appears to enjoy parachuting and snowboarding and later plays drums professionally. Robert was transformed into a tiger shark hybrid, deriving the Streex name from the purple streaks on his body.
- Coop Bolton/Big Slammu (voiced by D. Kevin Williams) is the youngest but strongest of the four. He is also a football player in high school. Coop was transformed into a whale shark hybrid and utilizes the "Seismic Slam", which enables him to shake or crack the ground with his fists.
- Dr. Robert Bolton (voiced by D. Kevin Williams) is a university professor and the father of the Bolton Brothers who invents the gene-manipulation device for peaceful uses. He is only seen on-screen in the first episode, where he tries to stop Dr. Paradigm's experiments, only to become changed into an unseen inhuman creature. Bolton secretly assists his sons, contacting them through a TV screen.
- Sir Thomas Bolton is an ancestor of the protagonists who is encountered in the episode "Sir Shark-a-Lot". He is the target of Paradigm's time-travel excursion to destroy the Bolton family.

=== Allies ===
- Lena Mack (voiced by Pam Carter) is a student of Dr. Paradigm's who suspects him of crime and therefore assists the Street Sharks. She has a younger brother named Malik.
- Bends (voiced by Jim Hoggatt) is a Fission University's technical genius and a source of comic relief who supplies the Street Sharks with their motorbikes and weapons and conceals them underneath the University's ice skating rink.
- Moby Lick, also known as Jets Taylor, is a good friend of the Bolton Brothers and Bends. Under Dr. Paradigm's mind control, Jets is combined with an orca by Dr. Paradigm in order to make him his latest Seaviate. Becoming Moby Lick, he later broke free of Paradigm's mind control and became an ally of the Street Sharks. Moby Lick has a long prehensile tongue, superhuman strength, the ability to inhale water and expel it through his blowhole, and the ability to communicate with other killer whales. In the episode "Shark Hunt", Moby becomes an eco-conservationist in the Everglades National Park.
- Rox (voiced by Lee Tockar), also as Melvin Kresnik, is an up-and-coming musician who is mistakenly combined with a bull shark and exposes Dr. Paradigm's plan to change Kresnik's audience into mutants. Thereafter, Rox continues as a rock star by explaining his altered form as a costume and remains a friend of the Sharks.
- David Horne (voiced by Tony Wike) is the President of the United States. The Street Sharks save him from Dr. Paradigm before he can be "gene washed" like he did with Vice-President Russell. Following this incident, Horne secretly leaks information to the Street Sharks.
- El Swordo (voiced by Garry Chalk) is a circus performer who worked with a large marlin named Spike. The two were combined by Dr. Paradigm, transforming El Swordo into a humanoid marlin. El Swordo remains active in entertainment as a professional swordsman.
- Mantaman (voiced by D. Kevin Williams) is a flying dinosaur-like alien specimen that was found encased in stone by Dr. Terrence "Terry" Morton and reactivated by Dr. Paradigm. Dr. Morton then deliberately gene-slammed himself with a combination of the alien's DNA and manta ray DNA to help the Street Sharks fight the original alien.
- The Dino Vengers is a military unit from an exoplanet inhabited by mutant dinosaurs who later allied with the Street Sharks. Once ordinary members of their race, the four volunteered to receive genetic enhancements that made them far larger and stronger to better combat Bad Rap and his gang of terrorists.
  - T-Bone (voiced by Ian James Corlett) is a Tyrannosaurus and the leader of the Dino Vengers.
  - Stegz (voiced by D. Kevin Williams) is a Stegosaurus.
  - Bullzeye (voiced by Jason Michas) is a Pteranodon.
  - Spike (voiced by Garry Chalk) is a Triceratops.

=== Antagonists ===
- Dr. Luther Paradigm (voiced by J. Michael Lee) is the main antagonist of the series and arch-enemy of the Street Sharks. A professor at Fission City University, he is easily identified by his metal eyepatch and later by a giant yellow robotic exoskeleton with offensive capabilities, including the ability to fire harpoons. In the second episode, Paradigm is injected with piranha DNA meant for Bends. When in public, Dr. Paradigm wears a robe to hide his exoskeleton.
  - SharkBot (voiced by Steve Gibbs) is a product of Dr. Paradigm's experimentation with robotics. It was used to free Repteel from prison and frame the Street Sharks for the crime. The Sharks ultimately reprogrammed SharkBot to destroy Paradigm's laboratory. SharkBot was later rebuilt as SharkBot 2.0, which fought the Street Sharks until the end of the series' second season.
  - Tentakill is a bipedal creature of unknown origins and species, first seen in the episode "Sir Shark-a-Lot" as Paradigm's newest weapon. It is incapable of speech and possesses limited intelligence.
  - Seaviates are a group of mutant sea creatures who serve Dr. Paradigm.
    - Slobster (voiced by D. Kevin Williams) is a lobster injected with the DNA of Genghis Khan and Thomas Blood.
    - Slash (voiced by Terry Berner) is a swordfish injected with the DNA of villains like Genghis Khan and Thomas Blood. Slash possesses a drill bit on its nose and speaks in a hissing lisp.
    - Killamari (voiced by D. Kevin Williams) is an anthropomorphic squid that is able to project natural "spears" or "harpoons" from his mouth and the many suckers covering his body.
    - Repteel (voiced by Tony Wike) is the only one of Dr. Paradigm's Seaviates to have originally been human. Mr. Cunneyworth is the aged owner and hotel manager of a run-down hotel that was accidentally demolished by the Street Sharks during a fight with Paradigm's Seaviates. As he had nowhere else to go, Cunneyworth willingly allows Paradigm to gene-slam him with a moray eel and an electric eel. As Repteel, he feeds on electricity and can shoot miniature eels (also charged with electricity) from his hands.
    - Shrimp Louie (voiced by Andrew Rannells) is a mutated shrimp and one of Paradigm's later Seaviates. He is not very strong, is quite the coward, and his primary weapons are large blaster guns.
- Maximillian Greco is an aged mafioso crime boss who blackmails Dr. Paradigm into using the Genetic Engineering Chamber to gene-slam him with the DNA of a rhinoceros and desert tortoise upon learning of his illegal and secret experiments. This granted Greco the strength of a rhinoceros and the longevity of a tortoise, rejuvenating him to half his real age.
  - Zeus and Apollo (vocal effects provided by D. Kevin Williams) are Greco's pet chihuahuas. They were genetically enhanced by Dr. Paradigm, which made them larger than normal.
- Malcolm Medusa III (voiced by J. Michael Lee) is a rich businessman and big game hunter who frequently targets endangered animals.
  - Clammando (voiced by D. Kevin Williams) is Medusa's right-hand man. He started out as a dockworker for Medusa before being mutated by toxic waste and transformed into an anthropomorphic clam.
- Dr. Techno-Piranoid (voiced by J. Michael Lee) is a future counterpart of Dr. Paradigm. Techno-Piranoid first appears in the episode "Shark to the Future" when the Street Sharks visit his timeline, where he has taken over the world with an army of Seaviates. In "Shark Wars", Techno-Piranoid collaborates with his present-day counterpart to make sure an event that led to his future remains intact. When the Street Sharks foil the plot, the future is altered and Techno-Piranoid vanishes.
  - MechaSharks are Dr. Tecno-Piranoid's army of mechanized shark monsters.
- The Raptors are trio of rogue Velociraptor-like criminals who come from the same exoplanet as the Dino Vengers.
  - Bad Rap (voiced by Doug Parker) is the leader of the Raptors, who has a metal brace-like device on his mouth and a rocket launcher on his right hand.
  - Haxx (voiced by Doug Parker) is a Raptor with implants on the backs of each wrist that produce green blades. His tail has been replaced with a blade capable of spinning like a drill.
  - Spittor (voiced by Doug Parker) is the scientist and brains of the Raptors. Spittor carries a tank with various liquids released from nozzles on his hands, tail, and mouth.

=== Recurring characters ===
- Guy in the Sky (voiced by Tony Wike) is Fission City's top air radio reporter and paparazzo.
- Detective Michael Brock is a police detective who investigates the Sharks' activities.
- Mayor Moreno is a mayor of Fission City.
- Danielle Lafond is Fission City's news reporter.

== Series overview ==
Season	Episodes	Originally released	
Season	Episodes	First released	Last released
1	13	September 7, 1994	November 28, 1994
2	19	January 5, 1995	May 29, 1995
3	8	October 3, 1996	May 18, 1997

== Episodes ==
=== Season 1 (1994) ===
No. overall	No. in season	Title	Written by	Original release date
1	1	"Sharkbait"	Martha Moran	September 7, 1994
Dr. Robert Bolton had invented a gene-slamming device for peaceful uses until his colleague Dr. Luther Paradigm uses it for his evil purposes. When Dr. Bolton tries to intervene, he ends up gene-slammed into an unseen inhuman creature during the struggle and escapes. While in search of their father, John, Clint, Bobby, and Coop are mutated into humanoid sharks by the evil Dr. Paradigm. While adapting to their new looks, the four brothers must avoid being seen.
2	2	"Sharkbite"	Martha Moran	September 14, 1994
The Street Sharks are on a run from the police along with their friends Bends and Dr. Lena. The Street Sharks must find a new place to live in and be safe from society.
3	3	"Sharkstorm"	Martha Moran	September 21, 1994
Ripster, Jab, Streex, and Slammu must protect their reputations and change the way they are being viewed in Fission City. They must fight Dr. Piranoid as well as finding their father once and for all.
4	4	"Shark Quest"	Douglas Booth	September 28, 1994
Dr. Paradigm captures Big Slammu to control his mind and the Street Sharks must break into Dr. Paradigm's hideout to save their brother.
5	5	"Lone Shark"	Dennis O'Flaherty	October 7, 1994
While the Street Sharks are going out for burgers, Dr. Paradigm transforms a squid he has acquired into Killamari who becomes the latest member of the Seaviates. The Sharks have to stop them from breaking into the Bolton home and stealing important genetic research data that their father left behind.
6	6	"Shark n' Roll"	Robert Schecther	October 14, 1994
When a musician called Melvin Kresnik accidentally digests contaminated popcorn and water that was tainted with a gene-slamming chemical, he becomes a bull shark later known as Rox and befriends the Street Sharks. Together, they have to save the concert in town and its attendants from being mutated into more mutants through the same way that Rox was mutated.
7	7	"Fresh Water Sharks"	Bill Matheny	October 21, 1994
The citizens of Fission City hear an announcement from Dr. Paradigm that he has invented a vaccine against the gene-slamming formula.
8	8	"Shark Treatment"	Dennis O'Flaherty	October 28, 1994
With the help of a mind-control serum, Dr. Paradigm turns Jets Taylor into a killer whale mutant named Moby Lick to be his latest Seaviate.
9	9	"Road Sharks"	Steve Hayes	November 7, 1994
When Streex has been captured by Dr. Paradigm, the rest of the Street Sharks alongside Moby Lick take to the roads to rescue him.
10	10	"Shark Fight"	George Arthur Bloom	November 14, 1994
Rox is back in town for the Fission City Music Awards and plans to play the evidence that would expose Dr. Paradigm's gene-slamming activities.
11	11	"Sky Sharks"	Michael O'Mahony	November 21, 1994
When his hotel had been previously destroyed by the Street Sharks and no family members to live with, Mr. Cunneyworth allows Dr. Paradigm to gene-slam him with the DNA of an electric eel and a moray eel which transforms him into Repteel. While Repteel is ordered by Dr. Paradigm to steal an advanced supercomputer part for his robotic machine, the Street Sharks take a cruise around the city to find the doctor's new Seaviate's location and put a stop to their evil plans.
12	12	"Shark of Steel"	Douglas Booth	November 28, 1994
The Street Sharks are framed and brought out of hiding by SharkBot, the robotic machine built by Dr. Paradigm in the last episode. The Street Sharks must once again defend their reputations and take on Sharkbot.
13	13	"Shark Source"	Douglas Booth	November 28, 1994
The Street Sharks discover an underground civilization of mutant crocodiles that happen to know Dr. Bolton after he cured them of their damaged genes. Meanwhile, Dr. Paradigm rebuilds SharkBot and captures one of the mutant crocodiles.

=== Season 2 (1995) ===
No. overall	No. in season	Title	Written by	Original release date
14	1	"Jurassic Shark"	Dennis O'Flaherty	January 5, 1995
Jab and Streex are sent back in time in two different eras by Dr. Paradigm's time machine called the Time Slammer. Back in the present, Slammu, Ripster, and Bends have to deal with Dr. Piranoid's Seaviates who are now joined by Shrimp Louie. With the help of some Atlanteans, Jab is able to travel in time to save his brother Streex.
15	2	"Sir Shark-a-Lot"	Martha Moran	January 12, 1995
Dr. Paradigm creates Tentakill as part of his time-traveling plot to have Killamari go back to the medieval times and kill the Street Shark's ancestor Sir Thomas Bolton. Ripster and Big Slammu hijack Dr. Paradigm's Time Slammer to prevent Sir Thomas Bolton from being killed.
16	3	"Shark to the Future"	Martha Moran	January 19, 1995
The Street Sharks are sent to a future where Dr. Piranoid controls everything as Dr. Tecno-Piranoid. They meet up with Bends' great-great-grandson General Bendsini and join the rebel forces.
17	4	"First Shark"	Gildart Jackson	January 26, 1995
The Street Sharks go to Washington D.C. to save President David Horne from being "gene washed" by Dr. Piranoid as part of his plot to control President Horne after he had successfully gene-washed Vice-President Russell.
18	5	"Rebel Sharks"	Jeff Kwitny	February 5, 1995
The Street Sharks and Bends travel to the country of Chernosium to help a child named Ilya (who had sent them a fan letter), rescue his father President Andre Knezevic, and overthrow a dictator named Ekerson Nozum.
19	6	"Space Sharks"	Wendell Morris, Tom Sheppard	February 12, 1995
After extracting alien DNA from a sample found on an asteroid, Dr. Piranoid tries to gene-slam the entire planet with this alien DNA mixed with manta ray DNA. The Street Sharks are sent up to space, per the President's request and help to not only stop Dr. Piranoid's gene slamming plan, but also defeat the alien monster that was released from the sample. They end up getting help from Dr. Terrence Morton, who ends up becoming Mantaman in order to help fight the alien.
20	7	"A Shark Among Us"	Michael O'Mahoney	February 19, 1995
Lena's brother Malik is among those who have been taking strength-enhancing pills. Ripster goes undercover to trace the source of the pills and discovers that a drug dealer named Jackal has been distributing the pills in order to get some recruits to help rob a bank.
21	8	"To Shark or Not to Shark"	Kim Rawl	February 26, 1995
The Street Sharks have suddenly become human again due to a formula made by Dr. Piranoid as part of a plot to keep the Street Sharks human permanently.
22	9	"Eco Shark"	Jeff Kwitny	March 5, 1995
While investigating the killer whale attacks, the Street Sharks and Moby Lick trace the attacks to Malcolm Medusa III's marine animal sanctuary called Medusa Cove which is being covered up by holograms to hide the pollution and trapped whales. They discover that businessman Malcolm Medusa III and his mutant minion Clammando have been using holograms to keep the town from knowing what is really happening.
23	10	"Close Encounters of the Shark Kind"	Jeff Kwitny	March 12, 1995
Mantaman returns to Earth to help the Street Sharks fight the energy-draining alien (which survived the space station's destruction in "Space Sharks") before it starts draining Earth's electricity.
24	11	"Satellite Sharks"	Dennis O'Flaherty	March 19, 1995
The Stromboli Circus is in town where El Swordo and his marlin Spike are the main attraction. Spike is soon targeted by Dr. Piranoid so that he can mutate and control it with the Chromifier Ray so that he can gain control of a satellite and control every head of state in the universe. His plan backfires when El Swordo becomes merged with Spike.
25	12	"Cave Sharks"	Phil Harnage	April 8, 1995
Fission City has suffered a blackout as Dr. Paradigm unveils the Wolverinepedes (a race of wolverine/centipede hybrids) which will be a solution to Fission City's toxic waste problems. The Street Sharks are contacted by Paxel of the G.E.C.O.s (short for Genetic Engineered Cave Organism) on behalf of Robert Bolton where they learn that toxic waste is leaking into their underground home beneath the garbage dump. The Street Sharks discover that the Wolverinepedes are a cover for Dr. Piranoid's illegal toxic waste-dumping property where the Wolverinepedes have been getting bigger from the consumption of toxic waste.
26	13	"Shark Wars"	Jeff Kwitny	April 15, 1995
Dr. Paradigm is visited by his future counterpart in his Time-Slammer where they work on a plan to develop a mechanism to alter the world's genetic code by New Year's Eve. The Street Sharks are tipped off about the disturbance in the time-space continuum by Dr. Bolton and work with Mantaman and El Swordo to thwart the two Dr. Paradigms and the future Dr. Paradigm's MechoSharks.
27	14	"Shark Father"	Bruce Shelly, Reed Shelly	April 22, 1995
An aged crime boss named Maximilian Greco discovers Ripster and Streex fighting Killamari and Repteel at a nearby zoo as part of Dr. Paradigm's plot to obtain animal specimens for his Genetic Engineering Chamber. Upon tracing Killamari and Repteel back to Dr. Paradigm, Maximilian Greco blackmails him into enhancing him with the strength of a rhinoceros and the longevity of a desert tortoise. Maximilian also has Dr. Paradigm have his chihuahuas Zeus and Apollo enhanced to fight the Street Sharks.
28	15	"Shark Hunt"	Wendell Morris, Tom Sheppard	May 1, 1995
Malcolm Medusa III and Clammando are back and have been hunting Florida panthers in the Everglades as part of a plot to develop a chemical waste incinerator there. After Moby Lick has been caught by Malcolm when trying to rescue them, the President enlists the Street Sharks to investigate where the trace the Florida panthers and Moby Lick to a nearby island where Malcolm has used a petrifying laser to petrify Moby Lick, the Florida panthers, and other wildlife in the Everglades. Now Malcolm plans to have the Street Sharks provide a hunting challenge for him.
29	16	"Card Sharks"	Dennis O'Flaherty	May 8, 1995
Maximilian Greco is back and has established a casino called the Golden Greco while making its surrounding areas as part of Fission City's casino district. Dr. Paradigm sends Repteel and Shrimp Louie to raid the Golden Greco and steal all the money there, yet Repteel and Shrimp Louie continue to rob other casinos causing Dr. Paradigm to send Killamari after them up to the point where the Seaviants are enlisted by Maximilian Greco to take over the casino district.
30	17	"Shark Jacked"	Kevin Donahue	May 15, 1995
Dr. Piranoid has Killamari and Tentakill capture Mantaman's younger brother Ryan so that he can get Mantaman to hijack two jets with one of them carrying the Latonian president and the other one carrying the Coachnian president where both of them are to be meeting with President Horne the next day. While Mantaman does the hijacking, Bends and the Street Sharks work on playing along while finding out where Dr. Piranoid is keeping Ryan. During that time, Dr. Piranoid has created the Genesis Satellite to end the world's woes by detonating it so that the world can be turned into mutated creatures.
31	18	"Turbo Sharks"	Jules Dennis	May 22, 1995
At the time when Jab is going to compete in the Cross-Country Grand Prix, Dr. Paradigm creates the Gene-Slam Bomb and places it in the Turbo Jab vehicle so that it would detonate at the Cross-Country Grand Prix if Jab does not have his car running at 65 MPH. The plot thickens when the International Trade Conference that is signing the Big Trade Agreement is threatened by Dr. Paradigm's Gene-Washing Bomb within an ice sculpture of two dolphins.
32	19	"20,000 Sharks Under the Sea"	Jeff Kwitny	May 29, 1995
At the time when El Swordo is entertaining the USS Liberty, a four-headed sea monster (where some navy officers have compared it to Scylla) has been attacking ships and submarines at sea. To prevent an international incident, President Horne enlists the Street Sharks to look into this. The Street Sharks work with El Swordo in order to keep the four-headed sea monster from attacking ships.

=== Season 3 (1996–97) ===
The third season of the series received a retooling, introducing a fellow team of characters titled the Dino Vengers. This season aired on ABC's Saturday-morning cartoon block during the fall of 1996.

No. overall	No. in season	Title	Written by	Original release date
33	1	"Ancient Sharkonauts"	Phil Harnage	October 3, 1996
A space capsule that landed on Earth 65,000,000 years ago has been unearthed by archaeologists. While Dr. Paradigm has taken interest in the space capsule, an incident involving the capsule's prisoner Bad Rap causes Mantaman to fall under his control (the alien whose DNA was used to create Mantaman was one of Bad Rap's many creations) as they plot to control the largest radio telescope in order to contact Bad Rap's fellow Raptors. The Street Sharks must work to free Mantaman before Bad Rap's transmission to his fellow Raptors gets through.
34	2	"Sharkotic Reaction"	Reed Shelly, Robert Askin	October 10, 1996
President Horne contacts the Street Sharks informing them that a UFO has been sighted in the Solar System. Upon investigating, the Street Sharks meet the Dino Vengers T-Bone, Stegz, Bullzeye, and Spike. The Street Sharks learn from them that they are after Bad Rap and the Raptors. The Street Sharks and the Dino Vengers join forces when the Raptors steal different weapons from different countries in order to make the other countries think they are being attacked by the other.
35	3	"Sand Sharks"	Louis Gassen	October 17, 1996
While fighting the Raptors, the Street Sharks and the Dino Vengers hear from President Horne that the military is testing their stealth Super Shadow chopper. As the Street Sharks and the Dino Vengers work to protect the Super Shadow from the Raptors, Dr. Paradigm takes interest in the Raptors as he leads Shrimp Louie and Tentakill into finding them where he will steal the Super Shadow for them in exchange for Velociraptor DNA. After Dr. Paradigm obtains the Super Shadow, the Raptors trick Dr. Paradigm by giving him iguana DNA. The Street Sharks and the Dino Vengers must work together to reclaim the Super Shadow from the Raptors.
36	4	"Shark Quake"	Peter Hunziker	October 24, 1996
During winter, the Raptors make plans to warm up Earth in order to make it more hospitable for the Raptors. They do this by making Mt. Cauldron (a dormant volcano near Fission City) erupt by firing a missile into it so that the heat from it can be trapped in Earth's atmosphere. After the Street Sharks and the Dino Vengers thwart that plan, the Raptors do what they did on Calderas 3 by using their computer to activate every dormant volcanoes on Earth. The Street Sharks and the Dino Vengers must prevent the Raptors from activating the dormant volcanoes on Earth.
37	5	"Super Shark"	Pat Allee, Ben Hurst	October 31, 1996
At the time when Big Slammu prepares for Fission City's comic book convention at a local convention center to meet his favorite comic book writer Jake Langstrom, Bullzeye learns about comic books and follows Big Slammu to the convention center. At the same time, the Raptors head to the Munitions and Armaments section of the Convention Center in order to steal the latest weaponry there.
38	6	"Jungle Sharks"	Jeff Kwitny	November 7, 1996
When the Street Sharks and the Dino Vengers stop the Raptors from stealing a submarine, Stegz, Spike, and Bullzeye come down with a virus with the same symptoms as the virus the Dino Vengers once contracted on the planet Zirus 10. The Street Sharks and T-Bone race against time and the Raptors to the Amazon rainforest to get to a special pharmaceutical fungus that would help cure the sick Dino Vengers before its final symptom takes its toll on them in the next 24 hours.
39	7	"Trojan Sharks"	Tom Sheppard, Wendell Morris	November 28, 1996
In order to track the Dino Vengers to their lair, the Raptors cause havoc at an amusement park and ambush the Dino Vengers where they managed to secretly place a tracking device on Stegz so that they can find the Dino Lair. When the Dino Vengers end up defeated and captured as part of Bad Rap's plot to launch them to the stars in a stolen missile, the Street Sharks must rescue the Dino Vengers before the Raptors can launch the missile they are on.
40	8	"Shark-apolypse Now!"	Peter Hunziker	May 18, 1997
At the time when the World Leaders have come to an agreement not to use biological weapons, the Street Sharks and the Dino Vengers are enlisted to guard a top secret facility that the biological weapons are going to be safely destroyed. In order for the Raptors to prevent the biological weapons from being destroyed, Dr. Paradigm (who is now Dr. Iguanazoid) puts the finishing touches on his mind-control chip which they plan to use on Bad Rap's alien creation after freeing it. This leads up to Dr. Iguanazoid releasing the other alien in the facility as part of his plot to rule Earth.

== Home media ==
=== United States ===
In 1995, Buena Vista Home Video released a VHS titled The Gene Slamming Begins, which featured the first 3 episodes of Season 1: "Sharkbait", "Sharkbite" and "Sharkstorm" combined into a feature-length format. Buena Vista followed this release with two tapes featuring Season 1 episodes: "Shark Quest", which had the episodes "Shark Quest" and "Lone Shark", and the other: "Shark 'n' Roll" which featured the episodes "Shark 'n' Roll" and "Fresh Water Shark". Unusually, these releases were branded as regular BVHV releases rather than being released under the DIC Toon-Time Video label, unlike other DIC VHSs released by the company at the time.

In 2012, Mill Creek Entertainment acquired the rights to release the series on DVD. They released Street Sharks - The Complete Series on DVD in Region 1 for the very first time in February 2013. Mill Creek Entertainment re-released the complete series on DVD in Region 1 five years later in January.

Discotek Media released the series on Blu-ray under license from 41 Entertainment and Invincible Entertainment Partners in 2022. This was Discotek Media's first release of a Western animated series that is not based on a video game.

=== United Kingdom ===
In 1996, BMG Video released three VHS tapes in the United Kingdom, featuring the same episodes as the U.S. VHS's, although the first tape was retitled as Jawsome!.

In 2004, Anchor Bay U.K. released a single-DVD/VHS volume featuring the first 4 episodes.

In 2005, Avenue Entertainment released two DVD volumes containing two episodes each: Volume 1 featured "Sharkbite" and "Shark Fight" and Volume 2 featured "Sky Sharks" and "Shark of Steel".

== Tie-in products ==
=== Comics ===
In 1996, Archie Comics released a small number of comic books based on Street Sharks. These included a three-issue miniseries which adapted the first three episodes of the cartoon, and an ongoing comic series, which lasted three issues.

Another Street Sharks limited comic book series from IDW Publishing was released in 2025. The series was written by Stephanie Williams with art by Ariel Medel and Philip Murphy, and ran for five issues.

IDW Street Sharks limited series
Issue #	Release date	ISBN	EAN
1	24 Sep 2025	82771403460800111	82771403460800111
2	12 Nov 2025	82771403460800211	82771403460800211
3	10 Dec 2025	82771403460800311	82771403460800311
4	07 Jan 2026	82771403460800411	82771403460800411
5	18 Feb 2026	82771403460800511	82771403460800511

=== Action figures ===
From 1994 to 1997, Mattel released a line of Street Sharks action figures. Mattel relaunched a line in 2024 for the series' 30th anniversary, featuring Ripster, Jab, Slash, Streex, Big Slammu, and Dr. Piranoid.

== See also ==
- Extreme Dinosaurs – a spin-off TV series
