= Bohbot Entertainment =

Marketing company

BKN, Inc.
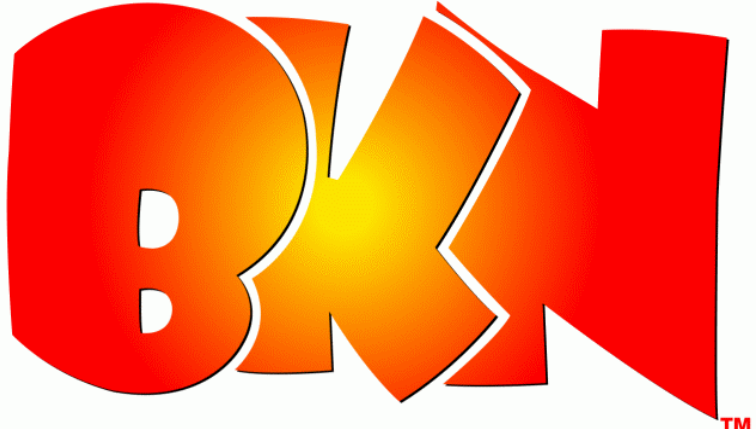
- Formerly: Bohbot Communications (November 1985–January 1994); Bohbot Enterprises Worldwide (January 1994–October 1997)
- Type: Private corporation
- Industry: Television
- Genre: Children's animation
- Founded: November 19, 1985; 40 years ago
- Founder: Allen J. Bohbot
- Defunct: January 2001; 25 years ago
- Fate: Purchased by BKN International
- Successor: BKN International
- Subsidiaries: Bohbot Kids Network; Quantum Media International; Bohbot Entertainment; BKN International

Bohbot Entertainment was an American advertising and marketing company specializing in the children's market founded in 1985 and had traded under various different names over the years. The company produced and distributed programming under their operated syndicated block – Amazin' Adventures, later renamed to Bohbot Kids Network (BKN).

== History ==
Bohbot Communications Inc. was founded on November 19, 1985, as a media planning and buying service. BC added additional services over the following 10 years: animated children’s programming syndicator, program syndication sales distribution, licensing and merchandising. After previous attempts at local promotions and request from promotional agencies at 1995 NATPE, Bohbot entered the national promotions field in 1996.

By 1989, Bohbot Entertainment is starting to enter into the syndication marketplace with the launch of the live-action talk show Girl Talk, which is hosted by Soleil Moon Frye. The company also obtained the rights to distribute the animated cartoon Ring Raiders, produced by DIC Enterprises for syndication. In 1990, Bohbot partnered with producers Saban Entertainment and video game publisher Acclaim Entertainment to launch Video Power in syndication. In 1991, Bohbot entered its fray by signing up as distributor of Saban Entertainment's program Adventures of the Little Mermaid for syndication.

By 1992, Bohbot had picked up distribution agreements with two leading children's producers Saban Entertainment and DiC Entertainment. BE obtained Saban's Around the World in 80 Dreams, which was distributed to syndication starting in 1993. Bohbot Entertainment also distributed 65 episodes of DiC's Adventures of Sonic the Hedgehog in syndication starting in 1993. BE picked up DiC's Double Dragon for syndication in 1993.

Bohbot Communications Inc. in January 1994 split its operations into two units, Bohbot Media Worldwide (BM) and Bohbot Entertainment Worldwide (BE). Bohbot Media would take over BC's media planning and buying services, while Bohbot Entertainment took over BC's TV distribution, licensing and merchandising, promotions and public relations operations. In 1994, Bohbot Media agreed to distribute A.J.'s Time Travelers for Time Travelers, Inc. to Fox Children's Network for which the various Bohbot entities were sued in 1995 along with the producers.

In March 1997, BE and DIC Entertainment agreed to a three-year output deal for Bohbot Kids Network consisting of five series. In September, the company renamed their "Amazin' Adventures" block as the Bohbot Kids Network, more commonly referred to by its initials: BKN. By October, Bohbot Enterprises Worldwide, Inc., Bohbot Entertainment, Bohbot Media and the International Division were renamed BKN, Inc. (BKN), Bohbot Entertainment & Media Inc. (BEM), Quantum Media International, Inc. (QMI) and BKN International respectively. Quantum was later renamed as BKN Media and closed in October 2000.

In April 1998, United Television and Columbia TriStar Television took a minority stake in BEM.

In 1998, BKN purchased Epoch Ink Animation which was renamed to BKN Studios.

BKN International went public and independent of BKN in 1999 on the Frankfurt Neuer Market stock exchange with BKN retaining 34% ownership.

In January 2000, Bohbot Entertainment & Media Inc. was sued by Sinclair Broadcast Group over a supposed failure of Bohbot to purchase enough advertising on the broadcasting group's TV stations as agreed to in their BKN Network carriage agreement. In July, the A.J.'s Time Travelers case ended in which the various Bohbot entities and Time Travelers entities had to pay damages with BKN paying $10 million, BEM $10 million and QMI, $5 million. By October 20, 2000, the syndicated blocks under the BKN name ceased operations.

BKN International in January 2001 acquired BKN, Inc.'s operating assets with BKN, Inc. would continue as a holding company with its BKNI holdings.

== Programming library ==
=== Syndicated series ===
- Girl Talk (1989)
- Ring Raiders (1989)
- Video Power (1990–1992)
- Inspector Gadget (1992–1994)
- Adventures of Sonic the Hedgehog (1993–1995)
- Mighty Max (1994–1996)
- Highlander: The Animated Series (1995–1996)
- Action Man (1995–1996)

=== Amazin' Adventures/BKN Syndicated Shows ===
- King Arthur and the Knights of Justice (1992)
- Mighty Max (1993)
- Double Dragon (1993)
- Street Sharks (1994–1997)
- Princess Gwenevere and the Jewel Riders (1995–1996)
- Ultraforce (1995)
- Skysurfer Strike Force (1995–1996)
- Extreme Dinosaurs (1997)
- Pocket Dragon Adventures (1998)
- Roswell Conspiracies: Aliens, Myths and Legends (1999–2000)
- Monster Rancher (1999–2001, English dub)

=== Programming blocks ===
- Amazin' Adventures (1992–1997)
  - Amazin' Adventures II (1995–1996)
- BKN (1997–2000)
  - Bulldog TV (1999–2000)
  - BKN Kids II (1999–2000)

=== Specials ===
- Kids Day Off (1992–1994)
  - Magic Trolls and the Troll Warriors (1992; 1994)
  - P.J. Sparkles (1992)
  - Peppermint Rose (1992)
  - Defenders of Dynatron City (1992)
  - Battletoads (1992–1993)
  - The Magical Super Trolls (1992–1993)
  - Moo Family Holiday Hoe-Down (1993–1994)
  - Bubsy (1993)
  - Moo Family Stall of Fame (1993–1994)
  - So You Want To Be (1993)
  - A Hollywood Hounds Christmas (1994)
  - Legend of the Hawaiian Slammers (1994)
  - Power Team (1994)
- Nick & Noel (1993)
- The Bears Who Saved Christmas (1994)
- Dot and Spot's Magical Christmas Adventure (1996)
