= Archie's Weird Mysteries =

Television series

- French: Archie, mystères et compagnie
- Genre: Mystery; Horror; Science fiction; Comedy
- Based on: Archie Andrews by: John L. Goldwater, Bob Montana, Vic Bloom, & Archie Comics
- Developed by: Jymn Magon; Brian Swenlin; Michael Patrick Dobkins
- Voices of: Andy Rannells; America Young; Camille Schmidt; Chris Lundquist; Paul Sosso; Tony Wike; Ben Beck; Ryle Smith; Jerry Longe; John Michael Lee
- Countries of origin: France; United States
- Original languages: English; French
- No. of seasons: 1
- No. of episodes: 40

Production
- Executive producers: Andy Heyward; Robby London; Michael Maliani; Richard Goldwater; Charles W. Grimes; Tony DeRosa-Grund; Michael Silberkleit
- Running time: 22–24 minutes
- Production companies: Riverdale Productions; Kent/QMA; Les Studios Tex; DIC Productions, L.P.; Arles Animation; Les Studio de Saint Ouen

Original release
- Network: PAX (United States); M6 (France)
- Release: 2 October 1999 – 22 February 2000

Archie's Weird Mysteries (French: Archie, mystères et compagnie) is an animated television series based on the characters by Archie Comics. The series premise revolves around a Riverdale High physics lab gone awry, making the town of Riverdale a "magnet" for B movie-style monsters. All the main characters solve strange mysteries in a format similar to both Scooby-Doo and Buffy the Vampire Slayer.

Produced by Les Studios Tex and DIC Productions, L.P., the series was initially shown mornings on the PAX network premiering on 2 October 1999, often with infomercials bookending the program. The series eventually premiered in France on M6 on 19 January 2000.

== Characters ==
=== Main ===
- Archie Andrews (voiced by Andrew Rannells) is a redheaded, freckled student at Riverdale High, and a reporter for the school newspaper. All of his news stories are centered around the surreal occurrences that take place within each episode and always end with "...in a little town called Riverdale". Despite his clumsiness and rash decision-making, he is overall kind-hearted and brave, and frequently attracts girls, human or otherwise.
- Betty Cooper (voiced by America Young) is a literal girl-next-door who is intelligent, comely, cute, level-headed, caring, and the head of the cheerleading squad. She is best friends with Veronica, despite them both competing for Archie's affection. She has bright blonde hair that's always worn in a ponytail.
- Veronica Lodge (voiced by Camille Schmidt) is a beautiful, rich, popular, and somewhat self-centered girl. She is best friends with Betty, with whom she also shares a rivalry for Archie's affection. Although both of them are frequently the target of Reggie's advances, Veronica is targeted somewhat more often. Her hair is black, long and wavy, just like in the comics.
- Jughead Jones (voiced by Chris Lundquist) is Archie's eccentric yet insightful best friend who almost always has food on his mind, especially hamburgers. He generally does not like girls, although he is close friends with Betty, and he often butts heads with Veronica and Reggie. This version owns a litany of pets throughout the series, most notably Hot Dog, who is just as lazy as he is. Jughead usually wears a gray whoopee cap on his head, covering his choppy black hair.
- Reggie Mantle (voiced by Paul Sosso) is an egotistical, aloof, prank-prone jock who has a one-sided crush on Veronica and is frenemies with Archie. He is generally the most disliked member of the group. In this particular incarnation, he has a niece named Amy.
- Dilton Doiley (voiced by Ben Beck) is a bespectacled, nerdy genius who is friends with Archie and the others. His inventions usually help save the day, although they are sometimes the cause of the titular weird mysteries. In this incarnation, he does most of his work in the school lab ("Invisible Archie" reveals that this is a reward for his exceptional grades), where he is often isolated from his peers and all but lacks a social life. His catchphrase is, "I'll be super amalgamated!"

=== Supporting ===
- Moose Mason (voiced by Jerry Longe) is a slow-witted but sensitive jock who is a friend of the gang. He is the boyfriend of Midge Klump despite their intellectual differences and is very protective of her, particularly from Reggie's advances.
- Ethel Muggs (voiced by Michelle Phillips) is a nerdy girl who has an open crush on Jughead. She is usually ignored by most of her peers despite her big heart. She is into magic and is also a beekeeper.
- Midge Klump (voiced by Jill Anderson) is Moose's girlfriend, in spite of their differences in intelligence. She is Reggie's love interest, although she does not like him very much. She is into athletics and wants to become a stuntwoman.
- Chuck Clayton is a boy who is friends with Archie and the gang, seldom seen without Nancy at his side. He only speaks in "Driven to Distraction", but is reduced to silent cameos elsewhere.
- Nancy Woods is a girl who is friends with Archie and the gang, seldom seen without Chuck at her side. She only speaks in "Driven to Distraction", but is reduced to silent cameos elsewhere.
- Mr. Waldo Weatherbee (voiced by Tony Wike) is the bald, short-tempered Principal of Riverdale High who has it in for Archie the most, blaming him for most of the weird events happening at school.
- Miss Grundy is the homeroom teacher of Archie and the gang, who has feelings for Mr. Weatherbee. Her first name was Geraldine in the original comics, but was changed Doris in the show.
- Coach Kleats (voiced by Matt Bross) is the athletic coach at Riverdale High, who considers Moose his favorite student.
- Mr. Flutesnoot (voiced by John Michael Lee) is Riverdale High's stoic science teacher, whose favorite student is Dilton.
- Pop Tate (voiced by Ryle Smith) is the owner and operator of the "Pop Tate Chock'lit Shoppe" shop where Archie and his friends hang out. He calls Jughead his best customer due to his large appetite.
- Smithers (voiced by Jerry Longe) is Veronica's cynical butler. He is aware of the supernatural, but is only interested in serving Veronica.
- Mr. Hiram Lodge (voiced by John Michael Lee) is Veronica's father who is disapproving of Archie.
- Fred Andrews is Archie's father, who is of Scottish descent and cares deeply about his generations-old traditions.
- Mary Andrews (voiced by Pam Carter) is Archie's doting mother. "Alternate Riverdales" reveals that she met her husband at the local movie theater.

=== Show-exclusive characters ===
- Dr. Beaumont (voiced by Jerry Longe) is a mysterious caretaker and owner of a curiosity shop, filled with magical artifacts that sometimes cause the episodes' conflicts. He provides advice to Archie and his friends as they solve mysteries.
- Lucinda is a Southern woman who lives in the woods outside of town. Considered to be a charmer, she practices voodoo magic, provides advice regarding the supernatural, and creates love potions.
- Mr. Fisk is the CEO of ZoomCo who, after discovering that his Zoom energy drink contains a mutant formula that causes some people to mutate into monsters, tries to bribe and stop Archie from telling the world on national TV. He convinces Archie not to tell the news, as doing so would destroy his company and many people's jobs.
- Olga Karpuchi is a shy but intelligent civilian identity of a superheroine, named Supreme Girl. Her enemy is the villainous Dr. Arachnid, and they both hail from the Twelfth Dimension. During her stay at Riverdale High, she works with Archie on the school newspaper and has a crush on him. She only physically appears in "Supreme Girl vs. Dr. Arachnid", but is first mentioned in "The Jughead Incident".
- Robbie Dopkins is a friendly boy on Riverdale High's athletic team, who debuts in "Invisible Archie", where he enamors both Betty and Veronica due to his muscles. He is said to be the reason that Reggie was kicked from the track-and-field team. Following this appearance, he is reduced to silent cameos in other episodes.
- Cynthia Kim (voiced by Jill Anderson) is the editor-in-chief for the Riverdale High paper who cares mostly about its viewership. Like most people, she can sometimes be skeptical of Archie's stories.
- Vinny Wells (or Vinnie Wells) (Note: Spelling is unknown, due to his name not being featured in the credits.) is a teenage delinquent who only appeared in the three episodes "Archie's Date with Fate", "Alternate Riverdales" and "Teen Out of Time", where he and his future self were the main antagonists. He first appeared in "Archie's Date with Fate", when he was said to be breaking into the other students' lockers for money to buy nachos.
- Count Medlock (voiced by John Michael Lee) is the leader of a vampire cult, who is the antagonist of "I Was a Teenage Vampire" and "Halloween of Horror". He plots to bring about an eternal night, allowing vampires to roam about Riverdale freely with no fear of the sun.
- Scarlet Helsing (voiced by Michelle Phillips) is a vampire girl who has a crush on Medlock and works to help bring his plans to fruition, butting heads with Archie and the gang in the process. At the end of the three-parter, she turns out to be the key to defeating her boss and helps the teens thwart him after he backstabs her.

== Episodes ==
Nº	Title	Written by	Air date
1	"Attack of the Killer Spuds"	Brian Swenlin	2 October 1999
Jughead wins a trophy after watching a television marathon, unaware that it is actually an alien potato capable of creating copies of its victims.
2	"Driven to Distraction"	Michael Patrick Dobkins	9 October 1999
In the interest of his car, Archie buys a pair of fuzzy dice from a mysterious shop with no knowledge of what the effect the dice will have on his car and what it could mean for his friends, who he has been ignoring.
3	"Me! Me! Me!"	Michael Patrick Dobkins	16 October 1999
Veronica does nothing but whine and get others to do her work, so her father asks her to help clean up some artifacts for a new exhibit. Among them is a wish-granting totem, which Veronica accidentally uses to turn all of Riverdale into duplicates of herself.
4	"Invisible Archie"	Brian Swenlin	23 October 1999
Archie and Reggie are unhappy with Betty and Veronica's new muscle-bound interest. Reggie suggests that they use Dilton's new physique enhancing formula on themselves. Instead of the desired result, they both turn invisible.
5	"Attack of the 50-Foot Veronica"	Jymn Magon	30 October 1999
Veronica accidentally put her finger on Dilton's new growth ray and grows to a 50 foot tall giantess and, in deep denial, goes on a rampage through Riverdale. It is up to Archie, Dilton and Jughead to bring her back to her normal size seven.
6	"The Haunting of Riverdale"	Michael Patrick Dobkins	6 November 1999
The ghost of Riverdale's old librarian comes back to haunt the town. Jughead refuses to help having bad past experiences with her.
7	"Curse of the Mummy"	Brian Swenlin	13 November 1999
Archie procrastinates way too much, all to the point where he breaks into the Museum to get his report done, evoking a Pharaoh's curse.
8	"Fleas Release Me"	Jymn Magon	20 November 1999
Tired of Reggie's werewolf pranks, Archie allows the local sheriff to arrest him, but it seems a real werewolf is attacking, with Reggie being the prime suspect.
9	"The Jughead Incident"	Michael Patrick Dobkins	27 November 1999
A pair of government agents come to Riverdale, thinking Jughead is an alien.
10	"Virtually Evil"	Brian Swenlin	4 December 1999
Archie's constant bragging gets him and his friends in trouble in a new virtual reality game.
11	"Zombies of Love"	Jymn Magon	11 December 1999
Veronica wants Archie to pay more attention to her, so she gets a hold of a magic potion. Now Archie won't leave her alone.
12	"Brain of Terror"	Brian Swenlin	18 December 1999
Moose needs a passing grade, so he uses Dilton's new experiment to boost his intelligence.
13	"Twisted Youth"	Michael Patrick Dobkins (story); Dick Shimm (teleplay)	25 December 1999
The faculty at Riverdale High turn adults into teenagers after drinking a new brand of bottled water. What is even stranger is that young Ms. Grundy is interested in Reggie.
14	"Monster in the Night"	Brian Swenlin	31 December 1999
A monstrous man of incredible strength is making evening appearances in Riverdale. Archie's investigation leads him to uncover the side effects of a new energy drink being tested on unsuspecting citizens of Riverdale.
15	"Mega-Mall of Horrors"	Don Gillies	7 January 2000
A new mall opens up in Riverdale, with everyone but Jughead wanting to buy more and more. The more the teens buy, the less they realize their friends have become window mannequins.
16	"Compu-Terror"	Jymn Magon	17 January 2000
After hurting himself, Archie reluctantly lets Reggie write the weird mysteries articles, but an evil genie now possess the laptop that Reggie uses, turning his fake stories real.
17	"Misfortune Hunters"	Jymn Magon	19 January 2000
Betty loves to do good deeds without using her judgement, but she quickly regrets it when a pair of treasure hunters trick her into releasing a gargoyle.
18	"Ship of Ghouls"	Brian Swenlin	20 January 2000
A legendary medallion has possessed Reggie and made him obsessed with retrieving an underwater treasure guarded by ghouls determined to keep it there.
19	"Something Is Haunting Riverdale High"	Michael Patrick Dobkins	21 January 2000
Midge, Dilton, and Ethel are not exactly the most popular of kids, so no one thinks much of it when they go missing. When Archie is rendered invisible and untouchable by one of Dilton's inventions, he finds that he must work with them to stop the haywire machine from turning Riverdale into a ghost town.
20	"Supreme Girl vs. Dr. Arachnid"	Michael Patrick Dobkins	24 January 2000
Veronica loves to dish out gossip, no matter the cost, which puts her and Archie in the middle of the Superheroine Supreme Girl's attempts at stopping her nemesis, Dr. Arachnid.
21	"Reggie or Not"	Jymn Magon	25 January 2000
Reggie is abducted by aliens, who leave a much kinder android duplicate in his place.
22	"It Lives in the Sewers"	Michael A. Medlock	26 January 2000
Archie and the gang go down into the sewers to find a mysterious monster. They soon discover that it is Jughead's pet alligator Peanut, mutated by a chemical waste spill.
23	"Dream Girl"	Michael Patrick Dobkins	27 January 2000
Feeling brushed off, Archie falls in love with a girl he sees in his dreams and she wants him to stay.
24	"Green-Eyed Monster"	Jymn Magon	28 January 2000
A new girl named Dorsa Finn arrives in town and shows interest in Archie. As it turns out, Dorsa is actually a local sea monster.
25	"Cinemadness"	James W. Bates	31 January 2000
Reggie refuses to help others, which he quickly regrets when movie monsters fill the town.
26	"Beware of the Glob!"	Michael Patrick Dobkins (story); Frank Santopadre (teleplay)	1 February 2000
Part of Dilton's new experiment is accidentally mixed in with the lunchroom's tapioca, creating a massive blob.
27	"The Day the Earth Moved"	Dick Shimm	2 February 2000
Archie refuses to continue his family traditions, until he learns it is the only thing preventing a giant worm from destroying Riverdale.
28	"Dance of the Killer Bees"	Brian Swenlin	3 February 2000
With prom around the corner, Big Ethel enlists Archie's help upon finding a swarm of humanoid bees.
29	"Extra Terror-estrial"	Jymn Magon	4 February 2000
Betty believes a cute alien is harmless and only wants to go home, but the others quickly realize that is not the case.
30	"The Christmas Phantom"	Michael Patrick Dobkins (story); Phil Harnage (teleplay)	8 February 2000
The department store's newest Santa Claus, Archie, is the only one in the mood to celebrate the holidays, but a phantom from an unbelievable source just might fix that.
31	"Scarlet Night"	Brian Swenlin	9 February 2000
Vampire Night Part 1 of 3: Veronica has a strange dream in which she is not afraid of a vampire but is terrified of a redhaired girl she sees.
32	"I Was a Teenage Vampire"	Brian Swenlin	10 February 2000
Vampire Night Part 2 of 3: Scarlet's master, Count Medlock, is unearthed and seeks to complete a prophecy that will bring the eternal night by transforming the 'Ender' into a vampire like them.
33	"Halloween of Horror"	Brian Swenlin	11 February 2000
Vampire Night Part 3 of 3: Archie and his friends gather for the Lodge's annual Halloween party, but menaces thought to be gone forever threaten to ruin the night.
34	"Archie's Date with Fate"	Michael Patrick Dobkins	14 February 2000
Time Travel Part 1 of 3: After using one of Dilton's two time machines, Archie finds himself living the same day over and over. He later finds out that local thug Vinny stole the other, using it to rewind time and attempt to rob a bank. At the same time, Archie is offered a scholarship to Europe.
35	"Alternate Riverdales"	Michael Patrick Dobkins	15 February 2000
Time Travel Part 2 of 3: Vinny's future self returns and teams up with his younger self to take revenge on Archie. Being the only one unaffected by the time changes, Archie has to stop Vinny before he becomes ruler of Riverdale and the rest of the world. With Reggie's continuing pranks causing Betty, Veronica, and Jughead to turn on him, Archie considers revenge.
36	"Teen Out of Time"	Michael Patrick Dobkins	16 February 2000
Time Travel Part 3 of 3: Believing that no one person can make a difference, as well as feeling isolated from all his friends, Archie decides to take the Europe Scholarship, but a mysterious somebody tells him to put on the time belt, which he will need to stop Future Vinny from unleashing a T-Rex on Riverdale.
37	"Invasion of the Cockroaches"	Jymn Magon	17 February 2000
Pop Tate revitalizes his restaurant to cater to adults, but when all of the adults in the town sprout antennas and talk like robots, he finds that he might need the help of his former customers to save the town.
38	"The Incredible Shrinking Teens"	Don Gillies	18 February 2000
While visiting a mad scientist convention, Archie and Jughead are accidentally zapped inside a shrinking booth and have to struggle for survival while being two inches tall in Jughead's messy room.
39	"Little Chock'Lit Shoppe of Horrors"	Jymn Magon	21 February 2000
Wanting to keep up with the new restaurant, Pop Tate allows Dilton to automate the Chock'Lit Shoppe, but the main processor used takes over the place.
40	"Big Monster on Campus"	Michael Patrick Dobkins	22 February 2000
Moose tries to prove he is more than just muscle when a rival team's star player outshines him, only for Archie to discover he is a robot.

== Broadcast ==
=== United States ===
The series first ran in the United States on PAX (now Ion Television), and was the first newly produced animated feature to first air on the network. It was planned to air alongside fellow DIC program Sherlock Holmes in the 22nd Century as part of an hour-long block, but the latter show instead aired on Fox Kids, leaving Archie to air alongside Where on Earth Is Carmen Sandiego? on the channel's PAX Kids strand. It later moved to a daily slot on the network and remained on PAX until late 2000.

In 2001, the show began to air in syndication on television stations throughout the United States, as a way to comply with their mandatory E/I regulations. The series would later be part of the syndicated DIC Kids Network block beginning in 2003, also to comply with E/I regulations.

From 2012 to 2018, the show reran on Ion's defunct sister network Qubo.

The full series has recently become available on Paramount+, Amazon Prime Video, and Tubi.

=== France ===
Archie, Mystère Et Compagnie first ran on M6 on 19 January 2000 as part of the channel's M6 Kid strand, and later reran on Disney Channel and Toon Disney in the country.

== Production notes ==
The theme song was written and performed by Mike Piccirillo. Musical underscore composers were Mike Piccirillo and Jean-Michel Guirao. The Riverdale vampires story arc episodes were put together and released on VHS as Archie and the Riverdale Vampires. The voice cast was provided by the Omaha Theater Company for Young People of Omaha, Nebraska.

== Comics ==
An ashcan comic tie-in also titled Archie's Weird Mysteries, written by Paul Castiglia, pencilled by Bill Golliher, inked by Rick Koslowski and colored by Barry Grossman was published in 1999. This led to a February 2000 launch for an ongoing, regular-sized series with the same name and creative team. The first issue notably serves as an origin story for the canon's premise, showcasing the implied lab incident that turned Riverdale into supernatural central, and the moment when Archie decided to start his Weird Mystery column.

"Weird" was dropped from the title starting with #25, signaling the end of the tie-in with the television series, and the comics were canceled at #34 after ten issues of doing straight mystery stories with no supernatural or science-fiction components.

== Films ==
=== Archie and the Riverdale Vampires ===
Archie's Weird Mysteries: Archie and the Riverdale Vampires was released onto VHS by Universal Studios Home Video on August 30, 2000, alongside fellow DIC films Monster Mash and Alvin and the Chipmunks Meet the Wolfman as part of Universal's "Haunted Fun" lineup. The film consists of shortened and edited versions of the episode "Attack of the Killer Spuds" and the Riverdale Vampires trilogy made to run at feature-length. Although the film does not consist of any newly produced content, it contains newly-produced narration by Archie who talks about how Riverdale ended up how it was.

The episodes that made up the film were also included within the Monster Bash Fun Pack alongside the rest of the Universal Haunted Fun releases, but the episodes are shown in their TV versions.

=== The Archies in JugMan ===
The Archies in JugMan is an animated television film produced by DIC Entertainment as part of the DIC Movie Toons series of made-for-TV movies. The film functions as a sequel to the series, utilizing the same character designs (although with different outfits and new looks) and much of the same crew and voice cast, and the similar theme of weird events happening in Riverdale.

It originally premiered on television on Nickelodeon on 3 November 2002 and was released on DVD and VHS shortly afterward by MGM Home Entertainment, followed by international airings on Disney Channel and Toon Disney.

== Home media ==
=== United States ===
VHS/DVD name	Episodes	Distributor	Release date
Monster Bash Fun Pack	Attack of the Killer Spuds; Scarlet Night; I Was a Teenage Vampire; Halloween of Horror	Universal Studios Home Video	28 August 2004
Spells Spell Trouble!	Archie's Date with Fate; Me! Me! Me! Invisible Archie; The Incredible Shrinking Teens	NCircle Entertainment	26 August 2008
The Haunting of Riverdale	Scarlet Night; I Was a Teenage Vampire; Halloween of Horror; The Haunting of Riverdale	NCircle Entertainment	26 August 2008
The Best of Archie's Weird Mysteries	Standalone release of Disc 1 from The Complete Series set	Mill Creek Entertainment	22 February 2012
Archie's Weird Mysteries: The Complete Series	All 40 episodes of the series	Mill Creek Entertainment	22 February 2012
Archie's Weird Mysteries: The Complete Series (3-disc re-release)	All 40 episodes of the series	Mill Creek Entertainment	6 June 2017

=== United Kingdom ===
VHS/DVD name	Episodes	Distributor	Release date
Volume 1	Attack of the Killer Spuds; Me! Me! Me! Driven to Distraction; Attack of the 50-Foot Veronica	Anchor Bay UK	28 June 2004
Volume 1	Extra Terror-Estrial; Big Monster on Campus	Avenue Entertainment	5 July 2005
Volume 2	Me! Me! Me! Archie’s Date with Fate	Avenue Entertainment	5 July 2005

=== Australia ===
All the Australian DVDs were released by MRA Entertainment.

VHS/DVD name	Episodes	Release date
Volume 1	Attack of the Killer Spuds; Me! Me! Me! Driven to Distraction	2005
Volume 2	Attack of the 50-Foot Veronica; Invisible Archie; The Haunting of Riverdale	2005
Volume 3	Curse of the Mummy; Fleas Release Me; Mega-Mall of Horrors	2005
Volume 4	The Jughead Incident; Virtually Evil; Zombies of Love	2005
Volume 5	Brain of Terror; Twisted Youth; Compu-Terror	2005
Volume 6	Monster in the Night; Misfortune Hunters; Ship of Ghouls	2005
