= Phil Harnage =

American screenwriter

Phil L. Harnage is an American television writer and screenwriter. He is known for his work at DIC Entertainment. He resides in Santa Monica, California with his family.

== Career ==
From 1986 to 2006, Harnage served as a key writer and story editor for numerous animated series at DiC Entertainment, including several licensed properties based on video games.

During his time developing The Super Mario Bros. Super Show!, he was responsible for writing the series bible and establishing the tone and humor of the show, which blended slapstick comedy with broad parodies of popular culture. Despite not being a gamer himself, Harnage wrote video game adaptations by watching producer John Grusd play and analyzing the visuals, themes, and characters of the source material. Nintendo provided very little narrative guidance, mainly focusing on maintaining the characters' visual fidelity, which gave Harnage and the writing team wide latitude to invent original stories and settings. He described the Mario show as being designed for syndication, which meant each episode had to function as a standalone story. Many episodes parodied well-known films, fairy tales, and historical settings —for instance, "Count Koopula" recast Bowser as a spaghetti-slurping vampire.

Harnage also wrote for The Legend of Zelda animated series, which aired on Fridays alongside the Super Mario show. He modeled the romantic tension between Link and Zelda after the 1980s series Moonlighting, with Link constantly trying to woo Zelda with kisses and catchphrases (most famously, "Excuse me, Princess!") and Zelda rebuffing him.

Harnage returned to the franchise to write for Super Mario World and created the character Oogtar, a bratty, club-wielding caveboy meant to act as a comedic foil to Yoshi. The character was widely disliked by fans, but Harnage viewed that response as a sign that the show had cultural impact.

He also contributed to the ensemble cartoon Captain N: The Game Master, although he noted it was not among his favorites due to its disjointed structure and lack of a clear lead character. He considered the format weaker compared to Mario and Zelda's more focused storytelling.

Some of his lines have taken on a life of their own in internet culture and fan circles, especially "Excuse me, Princess!" from Zelda and "That's Mama Luigi to you, Mario!" from World. Harnage said he was surprised those specific lines endured, noting they were just intended as simple punchlines at the time.

Outside of video game adaptations, Harnage wrote for dozens of animated series in the 1980s through the 2000s. He also recalled that one of his Captain Planet and the Planeteers episodes, titled "The Population Bomb", was shelved for years by the network due to its controversial subject matter on overpopulation.

== Filmography ==
=== Television ===
- Fat Albert and the Cosby Kids (1984)
- He-Man and the Masters of the Universe (1984)
- Challenge of the GoBots (1985)
- She-Ra: Princess of Power (1986)
- Maxie’s World (1987)
- Lady Lovely Locks (1987)
- **Hello Kitty's Furry Tale Theater** (1987)
- **Sylvanian Families** (1987)
- ALF Tales (1988)
- The Legend of Zelda (1989)
- The Super Mario Bros. Super Show! (1989)
- **Ring Raiders** (1989)
- Camp Candy (1989–1990)
- New Kids on the Block (1990)
- The Adventures of Super Mario Bros. 3 (1990)
- **Captain Planet and the Planeteers** (1990–1992)
- Bill & Ted's Excellent Adventures (1991)
- **Super Mario World** (1991)
- **Captain Zed and the Zee Zone** (1991)
- G.I. Joe: A Real American Hero (1991–1992)
- Super Dave: Daredevil for Hire (1992)
- **Double Dragon** (1993)
- Adventures of Sonic the Hedgehog (1993)
- Hurricanes (1993)
- **Street Sharks** (1994–1996): season 1 head writer
- Sailor Moon (1995)
- **Action Man** (1995–1996)
- Dog Tracer (1996)
- The Wacky World of Tex Avery (1997)
- Extreme Dinosaurs (1997)
- Sonic Underground (1999)
- **Sherlock Holmes in the 22nd Century** (1999–2001)
- Archie’s Weird Mysteries (2000)
- Mary-Kate and Ashley in Action! (2001–2002)
- Liberty’s Kids (2002)
- Speed Racer X (2002)
- Sabrina’s Secret Life (2003)
- Alien Racers (2005)
- Krypto the Superdog (2005)
- Trollz (2005)
- **Horseland** (2006–2008)
- The Land Before Time (2007)
- Special Agent Oso (2009–2010)
- Popples (2015)
- Rainbow Ruby (2016)
- Care Bears: Unlock the Magic (2019)
- The PRCG Northeastern Central and Southwest American Lesbian Sisters! (2026)

Series head writer in bold.

=== Film ===
- Banzai Runner (1987)
- Little Golden Book Land (1989)
- Strawberry Shortcake: Dress Up Days (2005)
- Strawberry Shortcake: Seaberry Beach Party (2005)
- Inspector Gadget's Biggest Caper Ever (2005)
