= Bohbot Kids Network =

Former American kids network

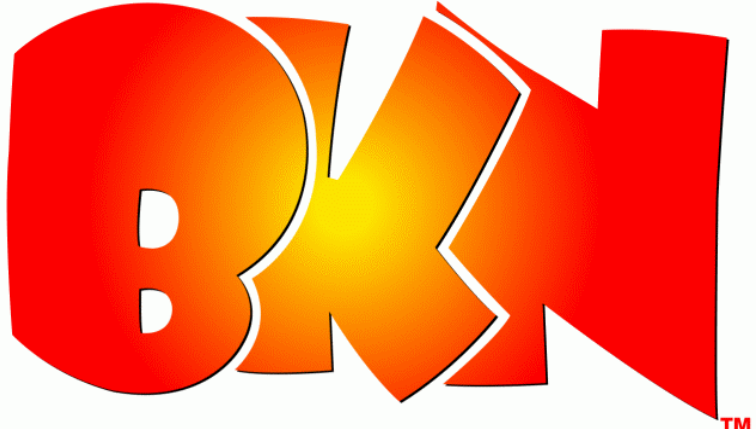
- Network: Broadcast syndication
- Launched: September 13, 1992; 34 years ago
- Closed: 2000; 26 years ago
- Country of origin: United States
- Owner: BKN, Inc.
- Formerly known as: Amazin' Adventures (1992–1997); Bulldog TV (1999–2000)
- Running time: 2 hours (1992–1995); 4 hours per week (1995–1996); 7 hours per week (1996–1997); 12 hours per week (1997–2000)
- Original language: English

BKN Kids II
- Network: Broadcast syndication
- Launched: August 29, 1999; 27 years ago
- Closed: October 20, 2000; 26 years ago
- Country of origin: United States
- Owner: BKN, Inc.
- Format: animated series
- Running time: 4 hours (weekdays)
- Original language: English

Bohbot Kids Network (more commonly referred to and on-screen as BKN, originally known as Amazin' Adventures until 1997) was a children's programming block operated by Bohbot Entertainment (later BKN, Inc.) that aired in first-run syndication and was distributed to local television stations throughout the United States from 1992 to 2000.

== History ==
=== Amazin' Adventures (1992–1997) ===
On September 13, 1992, Bohbot Entertainment launched Amazin' Adventures, a syndicated programming block that aired for two hours on Sundays. Byrne Enterprises sold barter for the block.

In August 1996, Bohbot announced that in addition to the standard Sunday block, an additional block tentatively titled Amazin' Adventures Anthology would also be broadcast. This block aired on weekdays for an hour a day.

=== Bohbot Kids Network (1997–1999) ===
Amazin' Adventures was re-launched as Bohbot Kids Network (BKN) in September 1997. By 1997, the network had signed up 104 stations reaching 75% of the US, with 65 stations airing BKN in pattern and 35 stations signing on for three years. Stations that aired the BKN block included BHC Communications stations, WCIU-TV, WPGH-TV, and The WB 100+ Station Group. During BKN's first season, its programs were split into three blocks: the "Extreme Block" (Extreme Dinosaurs and Extreme Ghostbusters) and the "Comedy Block" (The Mask: Animated Series and Adventures of Sonic the Hedgehog) on weekdays, and "Amazin' Adventures" (Captain Simian & the Space Monkeys) on weekends.

=== Bulldog TV and BKN Kids II (1999–2000) ===
With multiple offers in top 50 markets for the Bohbot Kids Network, Bohbot Entertainment scheduled the launch of a second syndication network, BKN Kids II, for September 1998 to meet the demand. BE also looked for shows from other syndicators to include in BKN Kids II. With financial setbacks that had happened in the past, a consortium of banks gave Bohbot $100 million in new financing in September 1998. Two new blocks were announced at the same time as well as the new chairman/CEO of Bohbot Kids Network, Rick Ungar. BKN also indicated that long-term network affiliation agreements were under close to being finalized with Chris-Craft/United Television, Tribune Broadcasting, Paramount Stations Group, Sinclair Broadcast Group and the WB network's WeB fill-in cable network. Station groups affiliating with BKN 2 at launch included Sinclair Broadcast Group, Tribune Broadcasting, Clear Channel Communications and ACME Communications.

On July 16, 1999, BKN announced that their main syndicated service would be relaunched as an action-oriented block on August 29. The service was internally named "Bulldog TV" because the block's bumpers featured an animated bulldog. Bulldog TV focused on action cartoons taken from Bohbot's existing catalog and acquired shows mainly from DIC, broken up into two-hour-long blocks that aired on weekdays and Sundays. Existing BKN shows such as Mummies Alive!, Double Dragon and Street Sharks made it to the rebranded service while two new original series, Roswell Conspiracies: Aliens, Myths and Legends and Roughnecks: Starship Troopers Chronicles were also added. The secondary syndicated service, BKN Kids II (branded as BKN on-screen) launched on the same day and broadcast a different lineup of shows in order to grant Syndex protection, BKN Kids II functioned as a more mainstream block focusing on a broader audience encompassing both boys and girls 2-11. Much of the programming formerly seen on the main service was moved to Kids II, with shows such as Mighty Max, Highlander: The Animated Series, and Adventures of Sonic the Hedgehog filling out the schedule. Two acquisitions, Sonic Underground and Beakman's World, also aired on Kids II. During this time, BKN had their shows aired on the Sci-Fi Channel on weekday mornings.

Bulldog TV and BKN Kids II ceased to broadcast on October 20, 2000. The WB 100+ Station Group continued to air reruns of BKN shows during the 2000–2001 season.

=== Revival of Amazin' Adventures brand as a YouTube Channel (2023–present) ===
In February 2023, 41 Entertainment, the current distributor for BKN's former content, filed a trademark for "Amazin' Adventures". Later on in the month, the brand was revived as a YouTube channel that offers up programs from 41 and BKN's catalogue.

== Programming ==
=== Amazin' Adventures ===
Title	Premiere date	End date	Source(s)
Saban's Around the World in Eighty Dreams	September 13, 1992	1993	
Saban's Gulliver's Travels	September 13, 1992	1993	
The Wizard of Oz	September 13, 1992	1993	
King Arthur and the Knights of Justice	September 13, 1992	1996	
Hurricanes	September 12, 1993	1994	
Mighty Max	September 12, 1993	1994	
Double Dragon	September 12, 1993	1996	
Street Sharks	September 7, 1994	1997	
Turbocharged Thunderbirds	December 1994	1995	
A.J.'s Time Travelers	December 1994	1996	
Gadget Boy & Heather	September 10, 1995	1996	
Princess Gwenevere and the Jewel Riders	September 10, 1995	1997	
Skysurfer Strike Force	September 10, 1995	1997	
Captain Simian & the Space Monkeys	September 8, 1996	1997	
The Mask: Animated Series	September 10, 1996	1997	
The Real Ghostbusters	August 1997	September 1997	

=== BKN ===
Title	Premiere date	End date	Block	Source(s)
Extreme Dinosaurs	September 1, 1997	1999	Extreme Block	
Extreme Ghostbusters	September 1, 1997	1999	Extreme Block	
The Mask: Animated Series	1997	1999	Comedy Block	
Adventures of Sonic the Hedgehog	1997	1999	Comedy Block	
Captain Simian & the Space Monkeys	1997	1999	Amazin' Adventures	
Jumanji	1998	1999	Extreme Block	
Pocket Dragon Adventures	1998	1999	Comedy Block	
Mummies Alive!	1998	1999	Extreme Block	
Mighty Max	1998	1999	Extreme Block	
Action Man	1998	1999	Extreme Block	
Street Sharks	1998	1999	Extreme Block	
Highlander: The Animated Series	1998	1999	Extreme Block	
Princess Gwenevere and the Jewel Riders	1998	1999	Amazin' Adventures	
Double Dragon	1998	1999	Amazin' Adventures	
Ultraforce	1998	1999	Amazin' Adventures	
Skysurfer Strike Force	1998	1999	Amazin' Adventures	

=== Bulldog TV ===
Title	Premiere date	End date	Source(s)
Extreme Ghostbusters	1999	2000	
Monster Rancher	1999	2000	
Mummies Alive!	1999	2000	
Rambo: The Force of Freedom	1999	2000	
Roughnecks: Starship Troopers Chronicles	August 29, 1999	2000	
Roswell Conspiracies: Aliens, Myths and Legends	August 29, 1999	2000	
Double Dragon	1999	2000	
Street Sharks	1999	2000	

=== BKN Kids II ===
Title	Premiere date	End date	Source(s)
Adventures of Sonic the Hedgehog	August 30, 1999	October 20, 2000	
Beakman's World	August 30, 1999	October 20, 2000	
Captain Simian & the Space Monkeys	August 30, 1999	October 20, 2000	
Extreme Dinosaurs	August 30, 1999	October 20, 2000	
Highlander: The Animated Series	August 30, 1999	October 20, 2000	
Jumanji	August 30, 1999	October 20, 2000	
King Arthur and the Knights of Justice	August 30, 1999	October 20, 2000	
Mighty Max	August 30, 1999	October 20, 2000	
Pocket Dragon Adventures	August 30, 1999	October 20, 2000	
Skysurfer Strike Force	August 30, 1999	October 20, 2000	
Sonic Underground	August 30, 1999	October 20, 2000	
