= Tony Wike =

American actor

Tony Wike is a retired voice actor and broadcaster based in Omaha. Previously, he was morning anchor and reporter for radio stations KFAB-AM and KGOR-FM, where he won the Nebraska Broadcasters award for Best Newscast in 2010. He also anchored morning news for stations in Augusta GA, Columbus GA and Greenville SC, along with anchoring sports for the Georgia News Network.

== Career ==
Before that, he was morning anchor and reporter for radio station WDUN-AM in Gainesville, GA, where he won the 2008 Georgia AP award for Best Newscast in Class B. He also is a freelance voiceover announcer for clients such as Ringling Bros. Barnum & Bailey Circus, The Pee Wee Herman Show, Godfather's Pizza, Country Music Television and Lozier Inc.

In 2003, he was elected to the Nebraska Radio Personalities Hall of Fame.

=== Acting career ===
He also appeared in two movies, Citizen Ruth and A Thousand Heroes.

=== Voice acting ===
He voiced characters in several animated series, including Street Sharks, Archie's Weird Mysteries and Liberty's Kids.
