= Skysurfer Strike Force =

- Genre: Action; Science fiction Superhero
- Developed by: Ted Pedersen; Mark Jones
- Directed by: Katsumi Minokuchi (chief)
- Creative director: Cesar De Castro
- Starring: Venus Terzo; David Kaye; Michael Donovan; Richard Newman; Paul Dobson; Janyse Jaud; Alvin Sanders; Terry Klassen; Ward Perry
- Theme music composer: Super Junky Monkey
- Opening theme: Skysurfers!!
- Ending theme: I Call Myself Sliced Ice
- Countries of origin: United States; Japan
- No. of seasons: 2
- No. of episodes: 26

Production
- Executive producers: Toshihiko Sato; Joe Ruby; Ken Spears; Allen J. Bohbot; Ralph J. Sorrentino (season 2)
- Producers: Hiroshi Kato; Sharon Eisenberg
- Cinematography: Mitsuru Sugiura
- Editors: Toshio Henmi (season 1); Craig Paulsen (season 1); Andrew Rose (season 2); Hiromi Komine (season 2); Kenta Katase (season 2)
- Running time: 30 minutes
- Production companies: Ruby-Spears; Ashi Productions

Original release
- Network: Syndication (Amazin' Adventures)
- Release: September 10, 1995 – October 26, 1996

Skysurfer Strike Force is a science-fiction superhero animated series that was featured on Bohbot Entertainment's Amazin' Adventures cartoon block and was co-produced by Ruby-Spears Productions and Ashi Productions. The show lasted two seasons (13 episodes for each season) in the mid-1990s. The first episode (first episode of the first season) aired on September 10, 1995, and the last episode (final episode of the second season) was on October 26, 1996. The show then aired in reruns on the Sci Fi Channel in 1999 through 2000. It was the final creation of Ruby-Spears Productions before shutting down.

The titular five-piece superhero team are Earth's guardians against the vile Cybron and his bio-borgs. The guardians use the powers of flight and the sky for their crusades against evil. The Skysurfers used technologically advanced watches that transformed them from their casual clothing to their battle attire and weapons, similar to the Battle of the Planets. During the transformations, their cars transform into rocket-powered aerial surfboards.

== Series information ==
"When a mysterious explosion destroys an artificial intelligence lab, Adam Hollister is framed - his son, Jack Hollister sets out to prove his father's innocence that someone else had caused the explosion and had stolen an experimental computer brain; merging it with his own brain, he transforms into the master criminal known as Cybron. To fight Cybron and his evil Bioborgs, Jack Hollister becomes Skysurfer One, leader of the Skysurfer Strike Force!"

— The opening narration from the first season

A mysterious explosion causes the destruction of an artificial intelligence lab that kills scientist Adam Hollister; in the aftermath, he is framed for the incident - his son, Jack, sets out to prove his father's innocence with a belief that someone else was responsible for the explosion and stole an experimental computer brain from the lab; this man who stole the computer brain merges it with his own and transforms into the master criminal known as Cybron, additionally founding a team of wrong-doing bio-borgs to aid him in his schemes. To fight Cybron and his forces, Jack and his four friends become a sky-themed superhero team known as the Skysurfer Strike Force.

== Characters ==
=== The Skysurfers ===
The title protagonists of the series, the Skysurfers are a team of five ordinary civilians who use their wrist-worn Digitrans to transform into their Skysurfer identities:

1. Jack Hollister aka Skysurfer 1: Born on July 9, 1974, Skysurfer One uses a beam saber as his signature weapon. He has amazing reasoning skills, and when confronted with a situation, he replies "What if it is?".
2. Micky Flannigan aka Skysurfer 2 - Crazy Stunts: Born on June 18, 1976, Crazy Stunts uses a blaster pistol for each hand as his signature weapon. The pistols can also shoot out whip-like wires and are powered by small diamonds. Crazy Stunts is a "happenin' young dude" and often uses phrases like "Hey, dudes" and other current jargon.
3. Kimberley "Kim" Sakai aka Skysurfer 3 - Sliced Ice: Born on December 24, 1975, Sliced Ice uses a sword that can freeze things in its path as her signature weapon. She is also a scientist.
4. Nathan "Nate" James aka Skysurfer 4 - Air Enforcer: Born on March 31, 1974, Air Enforcer uses many rocket launchers, missiles, and a wrist blaster as his signature weapons.
5. Brad Wright aka Skysurfer 5 - Soar Loser: Born on June 26, 1975, Soar Loser (a play on "Sore Loser") uses many small yellow boomerangs and one gigantic red boomerang as his signature weapons.

=== Cybron & the Bio-Borgs ===
In the universe of Skysurfer Strike Force, these villains are the series' leading antagonists:

- Cybron - The lead villain of the series. Cybron is the man responsible for framing Adam Hollister and the creation of the Bio-Borgs. He's mean, conniving, and, with the computer brain he stole, super intelligent. He plans on ruling the world and plots his defeat of the Skysurfers. He cares for no one but his daughter, Cerina.
- Cerina - Cybron's daughter, who shows signs that she is more than likely human. She has no powers and usually stays away from missions or battles. She seems to have a crush on Skysurfer One.
- Replicon - A blue-skinned shapeshifter who turns parts of his body into automatic weapons.
- Grenader - Basically a giant, walking grenade. He blows up when his pin is pulled and reassembles moments later. His usual function is demolition.
- Lazerette - Cybron's only (clearly) female bio-borg, she can shoot laser beams from her eyes and mouth.
- Noxious - Shoots toxic gasses from his arms.
- Chronozoid - Controls time for short periods.
- Dr. Five Eyes - Has eyes all over his body, one on his forehead can hypnotize his victims.
- Zachariah Easel - A talented artist who can bring any artwork to life.

== Episodes ==
Season 1

1. City of Terror: written by Kyle Christopher and Mark Jones

2. Death Paint: written by Steve Hayes and Ted Pedersen

3. Voodoo Master: written by Ted Pedersen and Francis Moss

4. Alien Attack: written by Mark Jones

5. Titan of Terror: written by Michael Maurer

6. Cyber-Magic: written by Michael Maurer

7. The Ancient City: written by Mark Jones

8. Time Storm: written by Francis Moss and Ted Pedersen

9. Killer Ants: written by Michael Maurer

10. The Dogs of Doom: written by Michael Maurer

11. Mountain of Fear

12. Terror Toons: written by Ted Pedersen

13. Life Force: written by Steve Hayes and Ted Pedersen

Season 2

14. The Black Box: written by Michael Maurer

15. Terror in the Jungle

16. The Crawling Horror

17. Crime City

18 & 19. Attack of the Slitha Monsters: A two-part story. Written by Michael Maurer

20. Sword of Power

21. Danger in Space

22. The Water Beast

23. The Price of Freedom

24. Two Minute Warning

25. Island of Fear

26. Diamonds of Death

== Media availability ==
=== VHS ===
Family Home Entertainment released three VHS tapes of the series in 1995 which contained two episodes from the first season:

- City of Terror (Episodes 1 and 2 (Season 1, first 2 episodes)):
  - City of Terror
  - Death Paint
- Voodoo Master (Episodes 3 and 4 (Season 1, next 2 episodes):
  - Voodoo Master
  - Alien Attack
- Titan of Terror (Episodes 5 and 7 (2 season 1 minus number 6)):
  - Titan of Terror
  - The Ancient City

=== DVD ===
From 2006 through 2007, Digiview Entertainment released the first 20 episodes (the entire first season and the first seven episodes of the second season) on DVD. Digiview's DVDs are stripped-down releases, carrying only the episodes and a basic interactive menu. They are found in thin-cases in discount stores (such as Walmart) and have been found for as low as a dollar in video bargain bins.

- Alien Attack (Season 1, first 4 episodes):
  - City of Terror
  - Death Paint
  - Voodoo Master
  - Alien Attack
- Time Storm (Season 1, next 4 episodes):
  - Titan of Terror
  - Cyber-magic
  - The Ancient City
  - Time Storm
- Mountain of Fear (Season 1, next 4 episodes):
  - Killer Ants
  - Dogs of Doom
  - Mountain of Fear
  - Terror Toons
- Life Force (Season 1's finale and season 2's first 3 episodes):
  - Life Force
  - The Black Box
  - Terror in the Jungle
  - The Crawling Horror
- Crime City (Season 2, next 4 episodes):
  - Crime City
  - Attack of the Slitha Monsters Parts 1 and 2
  - Sword of Power
