= Adventures of Sonic the Hedgehog =

Animated television series

- Genre: Adventure; Slapstick
- Based on: Sonic the Hedgehog by: Yuji Naka; Naoto Ohshima; Hirokazu Yasuhara
- Developed by: Bruce Shelly; Reed Shelly; Phil Harnage; Kent Butterworth
- Directed by: Kent Butterworth; Blair Peters (Special only)
- Starring: Jaleel White
- Voices of: Long John Baldry; Garry Chalk; Ian James Corlett; Phil Hayes; Christopher Welch
- Theme music composer: Clark Gassman
- Composers: Reed Robbins; Mark Simon; Stephen C. Marston (Special only)
- Country of origin: United States
- Original language: English
- No. of seasons: 1
- No. of episodes: 65; 1 special; 1 pilot

Production
- Executive producers: Andy Heyward; Robby London; Michael Maliani (Special only)
- Producer: Kent Butterworth
- Editors: Mark A. McNally; Sue Odjakjian; CK Horness
- Running time: 22 minutes
- Production companies: DIC Animation City (Note: Animation outsourced to Hong Ying Animation, Saerom Animation, Tokyo Movie Shinsha and Rainbow Animation); Sega of America; Reteitalia, S.p.A.; Bohbot Communications

Original release
- Network: First-run syndication
- Release: September 6 – December 3, 1993
- Release: November 24, 1996 (Special)

Related
- Sonic the Hedgehog; Sonic Underground; Sonic the Hedgehog: The Movie; Sonic X; Sonic Boom; Sonic Prime

Adventures of Sonic the Hedgehog is an American animated television series. It is based on the Sonic the Hedgehog video game series by Sega, produced by Sega of America, DIC Animation City, Bohbot Entertainment and the Italian studio Reteitalia S.p.A. in association with Spanish network Telecinco. The series aired a total of sixty-five episodes from September 6 to December 3 in 1993. It was syndicated by Bohbot Entertainment in the United States. The series features Jaleel White as the voice of Sonic the Hedgehog, a fast and wisecracking blue hedgehog, and his companion Tails (voiced by Christopher Stephen Welch), a young two-tailed fox. Set in the franchise's main world of Mobius, the series mainly follows the duo's comedic adventures against antagonist Doctor Ivo Robotnik (voiced by Long John Baldry) and his minions Scratch, Grounder, and Coconuts.

A spin-off video game, Dr. Robotnik's Mean Bean Machine, was developed, featuring several original characters from the series. Additionally, on November 24, 1996, USA Network aired Sonic Christmas Blast, a Christmas special which was produced to promote Sonic 3D Blast (originally meant for the ultimately cancelled Sonic X-treme). The series has been met with mixed critical reception both contemporarily and retroactively: more favorable reviews praised the series' fast pace and positive tone, while less favorable reviews derided the humor and animation styles.

== Plot ==
Adventures of Sonic the Hedgehog is a comical, light-hearted and gag-driven adventure series based on the titular character Sonic the Hedgehog, an arrogant and mischievous yet kind-hearted teenage hedgehog with the power to move at supersonic speeds. Sonic, along with his idolizing young friend Tails, regularly oppose the main antagonist Dr. Robotnik, his robot henchmen Scratch, Grounder and Coconuts, and thwart their plans to conquer their home planet of Mobius.

The series features a short PSA segment titled "Sonic Says" at the end of each episode (excluding "Sonic Christmas Blast"). These segments were written by Phil Harnage and allowed the series to meet the newly implemented guidelines set forth by the Children's Television Act.

== Characters ==
=== Heroes ===
- Sonic the Hedgehog (voiced by Jaleel White) is a blue hedgehog who is the main protagonist of the series. He travels the world and works to defend Mobius from the threat of Dr. Robotnik. Just like in the video games, Sonic can move at fast speeds. He has also shown to be quite cunning and deceitful, using various tricks and disguises to get one over his opponents, especially whenever his speed is nullified.
- Miles "Tails" Prower (voiced by Christopher Stephen Welch in the TV series, Chris Turner in "Sonic Christmas Blast") is a two-tailed fox who is Sonic's co-star, best friend, and sidekick. Sonic found him as a toddler, apparently abandoned because of his multiple tails, which he can use to fly like in the video games. He usually displays child-like intelligence but has shown to have exceptional skills as a mechanic and a pilot like his video game counterpart.

=== Villains ===
- Doctor Ivo Robotnik (voiced by Long John Baldry) is a megalomaniacal mad scientist who seeks to conquer and rule Mobius as a tyrant and is obsessed with eliminating his archenemy Sonic the Hedgehog as an obstacle to his ambition.
- Scratch (voiced by Phil Hayes) is a brash and arrogant chicken-based Badnik, the elder twin brother of Grounder, and a member of the Super Special Sonic Search and Smash Squad.
- Grounder (voiced by Garry Chalk) is a naive and dim-witted mole-based Badnik, the younger twin brother of Scratch, and a member of the Super Special Sonic Search and Smash Squad.
- Coconuts (voiced by Ian James Corlett) is an ambitious and hyperactive monkey-based Badnik who resents his relegation to menial duties and seeks to up his status by impressing Robotnik.

== Episodes ==
=== Pilot ===
No.	Title	Sonic Says segment	Written by	Original release date	Prod. code
0	"Pilot"	Pedestrian crossing	Kent Butterworth	Unaired	238-100
This is the pilot that was used to sell the show. Note: While Sonic is voiced by Jaleel White, the voices of Doctor Robotnik and Scratch are provided by Jim Cummings, the voice of Tails is provided by Russi Taylor and Gary Owens plays the narrator. One of the scenes from the pilot was later reused for the series' ending credits. Additionally in the episode "Untouchable Sonic", Scratch and Grounder can be seen watching clips from the pilot on television.

=== Main episodes ===
No.	Title	Sonic Says segment	Written by	Original release date	Prod. code
1	"Best Hedgehog"	Reading	Martha Moran	September 6, 1993	238-113
Sonic and Tails rescue Lucas, Robotnik's first prisoner, and attempt to reunite him with his and Robotnik's high school sweetheart, Lucinda.
2	"Tails' New Home"	Running away	Bruce Shelly and Reed Shelly	September 7, 1993	238-116
Learning about Sonic's resolve to find Tails a suitable foster home to ensure his safety, Robotnik has two of his Badniks pose as Tails' long-lost parents. Note: For unknown reasons, the music in this episode (except for the intro and end credits) is in a lower pitch compared to other episodes in the series.
3	"Birth of a Salesman"	False advertising	Bruce Shelly, Reed Shelly, and Steven J. Fisher	September 8, 1993	238-112
Energetic salesman Wes Weasley sells Robotnik numerous gadgets to help Scratch and Grounder capture Sonic. However, Robotnik later comes to regret it when they keep backfiring.
4	"Submerged Sonic"	Shallow water	Bob Forward	September 9, 1993	238-126
When Robotnik attacks the city of Submerbia in the Labyrinth Zone with the intent of obtaining its fabled Power Pearls, Sonic and Tails are enlisted by a local citizen to thwart his plot.
5	"Pseudo Sonic"	Poison ivy	Cliff MacGillivray	September 10, 1993	238-122
Plotting to tarnish Sonic's reputation, Robotnik develops a robotic replication of him that he forces his unwilling laboratory rat to operate.
6	"Over the Hill Hero"	Wisdom of elders	Francis Moss	September 13, 1993	238-117
When former superhero Captain Rescue bungles in his attempts to help Sonic, he grows tired of his incompetence. Robotnik then manipulates Rescue into detaining Sonic in an impenetrable force field and he and Tails must save him.
7	"Robolympics"	Being active	Jeffrey Scott	September 14, 1993	238-146
An asteroid is heading for Turtle Town and Robotnik offers to save it, but only if Sonic agrees to play in the Robolympics against him and his robots.
8	"Lovesick Sonic"	Sexual harassment	Bruce Shelly and Reed Shelly	September 15, 1993	238-103
When Sonic saves a female hedgehog named Breezie, he falls in love. Little does he know that Breezie is a robot that Robotnik created to keep Sonic occupied while he attempts to flood a village near his fortress.
9	"Subterranean Sonic"	Sharing	Robert Askin	September 16, 1993	238-102
Sonic and Tails escape underground from Scratch and Grounder, but they are held captive there by a miserly mole named Spelunk.
10	"Grounder the Genius"	Using your brain	Doug Molitor	September 17, 1993	238-123
Grounder accidentally puts a "genius chip" in his head and it makes him too intelligent that he easily captures Sonic and even takes over Robotnik's operations.
11	"High Stakes Sonic"	Dares	Robert Askin	September 20, 1993	238-105
Sonic and Tails infiltrate Robotnik's new Casino Night Zone to stop him and his henchmen from scamming some Mobians into becoming the doctor's slaves.
12	"Blank-Headed Eagle"	Seat belt safety	Dennis O'Flaherty	September 21, 1993	238-118
When Scratch develops amnesia that makes him believe he is his television idol, Edgar Eagle, Sonic uses this as an advantage to foil another one of Robotnik's schemes.
13	"Boogey-Mania"	Sleep	Rowby Goren	September 22, 1993	238-127
Robotnik reconfigures Professor Von Schlemmer's machine that can bring figments of dreams into reality and unleashes a dream monster upon Mobius.
14	"Big Daddy"	Telling parents where you are going	Jess Borgeson	September 23, 1993	238-110
After being exiled by Robotnik, Coconuts finds a lost infantile ape who thinks he is his father and attempts to use it to stop Sonic. The ape's father is under the control of Robotnik and Sonic has to save him. Note: Pierre DeCelles, an animation director, described this episode as one he felt "really proud of," though he described the editing as "poor". He described that the animation process took "four times longer than usual" since the episode's animator was a deaf-mute; he described his translator as "just great".
15	"The Robotnik Express"	Strangers	Doug Booth	September 24, 1993	238-114
En route to stop a runaway train from arriving at Robotnik's munition factory, Sonic and Tails must deal with a duo of bears named Big Griz and Mad Mike after they mistake Scratch and Grounder for them.
16	"Momma Robotnik's Birthday"	Trees	Francis Moss	September 27, 1993	238-109
Robotnik's obnoxious and abusive mother visits her son on her birthday and expects a present. After he fails to ravage Mobius' national park as one, however, she decides to capture Sonic as her own gift.
17	"Slowwww Going"	Those who have something special to offer	Eleanor Burian-Mohr and Jack Hanrahan	September 28, 1993	238-104
Sonic must save a family of sloths from Robotnik's latest invention that can slow down the molecular motion of anything it hits, but when he himself is affected by the device, Tails and the sloths must take action.
18	"So Long Sucker"	Pets	Cydne Clark and Steve Granat	September 29, 1993	238-120
Tails adopts a squishy creature from another dimension named Goopster, who can sometimes act like a black hole.
19	"Robotnik's Rival"	Cheating	Gordon Bressack	September 30, 1993	238-136
Robotnik and a rival named Doctor Brandon Quark try to cooperate in capturing Sonic. However, Sonic tricks them into becoming enemies and they eventually try to outdo each other.
20	"Trail of the Missing Tails"	Remembering your phone number	Bob Forward	October 1, 1993	238-107
Robotnik's insane cousin, Doctor Warpnik, kidnaps Tails and lures Sonic into the Warp of Confusion in order to take revenge on the doctor for banishing him there.
21	"Momma Robotnik Returns"	Obeying laws and going to court	Francis Moss	October 4, 1993	238-132
Momma Robotnik visits her son, and after he fails once again, she disowns him and decides to adopt Sonic as her own son in order to capture him. In a turn of events, Sonic ends up living the life of Cinderella.
22	"Too Tall Tails"	Healthy diets	Rowby Goren	October 5, 1993	238-115
While Sonic and Tails visit Wienerville, the "weenie capital of Mobius", Robotnik attempts to use Professor Von Schlemmer's size enhancement machine for his latest scheme. However, the machine backfires and instead enlarges Tails. Unable to control his appetite, Tails now begins to cause chaos for Wienerville. Sonic must return Tails to his former size when Robotnik tricks the citizens into thinking that Sonic is responsible for the incident, while he is planning to save the town.
23	"Super Special Sonic Search & Smash Squad"	Emergency calling	Bruce Shelly and Reed Shelly	October 6, 1993	238-101
When Sonic and Tails are captured by Scratch and Grounder, the former creates a diversion by telling the duo the story of their creation.
24	"Magnificent Sonic"	Gun safety	Jeffrey Scott	October 7, 1993	238-147
Sonic becomes the sheriff of an American frontier-styled town, in hopes of keeping Robotnik's cronies from harassing the locals.
25	"Zoobotnik"	Wildlife	Rowby Goren	October 8, 1993	238-140
An intergalactic huntress visits Mobius, capturing various citizens and falling in love with Robotnik.
26	"Tails in Charge"	Home safety	Martha Moran	October 11, 1993	238-124
When Scratch and Grounder use Robotnik's latest invention that can turn things to stone against Sonic, Tails attempts to foil the duo to ensure Sonic's safety.
27	"Musta Been a Beautiful Baby"	Tumble dryers	Gordon Bressack	October 12, 1993	238-128
Robotnik's attempt to cause Sonic to age rapidly with his newest device backfires, turning him and Tails, and later himself, into infants. Now stuck in a daycare, Sonic and Tails must try to keep Robotnik under control, while Scratch and Grounder attempt to rescue him.
28	"Sonic the Matchmaker"	Playground safety	Robert Askin	October 13, 1993	238-138
Robotnik pursues Breezie and Robotnik Jr. in order to find out why they betrayed him with the intent of building a perpetually loyal robot wife. In a subplot, Junior falls in love with Breezie and enlists Sonic's help in winning her affection.
29	"Attack on Pinball Fortress"	Stupidity	Bob Forward	October 14, 1993	238-141
Robotnik has unleashed his Stupidity Ray on Mobius, knowing that those affected by it will be too unintelligent to stop him. As Sonic and Tails make their way to Robotnik's new lair, the Pinball Fortress, they find themselves competing with Wes Weasley and Sergeant Doberman, both of whom want to capture the device for their own purposes.
30	"The Last Resort"	Walking alone	Gordon Bressack	October 15, 1993	238-135
Robotnik seemingly announces his surrender to Sonic and he invites him to a resort. Unbeknownst to Sonic, the resort is just another trap from the doctor.
31	"Coachnik"	Warming up	Doug Molitor	October 18, 1993	238-143
Robotnik constructs a pushy coach robot in an attempt to increase Scratch and Grounder's fitness. This leaves Robotnik time to create a football-like bomb in order to defeat Sonic by secretly placing it in Grounder's head.
32	"Sonic Gets Thrashed"	Pollution and non-recyclable packaging	Cydne Clark and Steve Granat	October 19, 1993	238-121
When Robotnik opens up a resort to enslave resident Mobians, Sonic enlists the help of some robots from an area called Scrap Valley.
33	"Close Encounter of the Sonic Kind"	Sunburns	Douglas Zip Purgason	October 20, 1993	238-108
Sonic and Tails help an alien prince fix his space shuttle so that he can return to his home planet for his coronation right before his younger brother is crowned in his place and has Mobius destroyed.
34	"Tails Prevails"	Using your imagination	Bob Forward	October 21, 1993	238-139
On Sonic's birthday, Tails builds a flying bicycle. Realizing Tails' potential with mechanics, Professor Von Schlemmer invites Tails to be his research assistant, but then Robotnik captures and impersonates him to get Tails to build his latest anti-Sonic weapon.
35	"Robotnik, Jr."	Peer pressure	Robert Askin	October 22, 1993	238-129
Robotnik constructs a robotic son in order to have carry on his legacy. The son, however, is inspired by Sonic and helps him thwart his latest scheme.
36	"The Magic Hassle"	Money	Douglas Zip Purgason	October 25, 1993	238-137
Coconuts acquires a magic wand and magical gadgets from Wes Weasley, after agreeing to forward all payments to Robotnik, and attempts to master them. Meanwhile, Robotnik tries to reshape the Mobius Mint's Sonic-themed banknotes in his image.
37	"Black Bot the Pirate"	Caution with sharp objects	Jeffrey Scott	October 26, 1993	238-148
Robotnik goes time-traveling to find the four Chaos Emeralds that bestow upon the user unlimited power. His first stop is the time of Blackbeard the Pirate, where he enlists the pirate's help to find the first emerald. However, with help from a local scientist, Sonic and Tails go after him, and thwart his attempts to obtain the emerald.
38	"Hedgehog of the 'Hound' Table"	Swimming alone	Jeffrey Scott	October 27, 1993	238-149
Robotnik's next stop in his search for the Chaos Emeralds is the Middle Ages, where the second emerald is. Sonic follows him, but Robotnik, with the unwilling help of a local wizard, obtains the emerald and rises to power.
39	"Robotnik's Pyramid Scheme"	Skateboard safety	Jeffrey Scott	October 28, 1993	238-150
In his next time-travel stop, Robotnik plans on erasing Sonic's family tree while he attempts to get the third emerald in Ancient Mobigypt. Sonic manages to prevent Robotnik from interfering with his ancestors' meeting and then races to the crypt of Robotnik's ancestor, where the emerald is kept.
40	"Prehistoric Sonic"	Electrical appliance safety	Jeffrey Scott	October 29, 1993	238-151
Despite the intervention of Sonic and Tails, Robotnik obtains the fourth and final emerald in prehistory. With the emeralds gathered together, Robotnik uses them to become an all-powerful being.
41	"Untouchable Sonic"	Gangs	Dennis O'Flaherty	November 1, 1993	238-144
Sonic comes to the rescue of a town that is held for ransom by Robotnik's crime syndicate.
42	"Sonic Breakout"	Graffiti	Douglas Zip Purgason	November 2, 1993	238-106
Robotnik imprisons a satirical cartoonist for mocking him in his comic book, much to the chagrin of his biggest fan Sonic, who purposely allows his own capture as well, but doesn't expect to be placed in a maximum-security jail cell. Robotnik angrily sends Sonic in the cell for interfering with his plans once again.
43	"Sonically Ever After"	Library	Gordon Bressack	November 3, 1993	238-165
Scratch and Grounder use Robotnik's latest invention to transport him, Sonic and Tails into a book of fairy tales. When some of the fairy tales come to life under Robotnik's control, Sonic and Tails have to try to give them happy endings to stop Robotnik.
44	"The Mystery of the Missing Hi-tops"	Stealing	Ed Ferrara and Kevin Murphy	November 4, 1993	238-119
During a fair in his honor, Sonic's shoes are stolen and he and Tails use detective intellect to find the thief.
45	"Super Robotnik"	Chemicals	Rowby Goren	November 5, 1993	238-145
A chemical accident caused by Coconuts ends up giving superpowers to Robotnik, who quickly uses them to threaten Mobius' world leaders and publicly humiliate Sonic. However, Robotnik isn't completely invincible and Sonic must find a way to exploit a potential weak spot in Robotnik's newfound powers in an Olympics-style gladiator match.
46	"Mass Transit Trouble"	Bicycle safety	Ed Ferrera and Kevin Murphy	November 8, 1993	238-142
When Robotnik threatens to bomb an airport, a lighthouse and a train station at once, Sonic is forced to travel to all three places in order to remove the bombs. Note: This episode ran for approximately a year and a half before the Oklahoma City bombing forced the episode's withdrawal from circulation. Later, as the incident died down, Toon Disney picked the episode up again, only to have it removed from circulation after about three years of airtime due to the September 11th attacks.
47	"Spaceman Sonic"	Common colds	Bruce Shelly and Reed Shelly	November 9, 1993	238-133
Robotnik sends Scratch and Grounder into space to pillage an asteroid belt, with Sonic and Tails in pursuit. When the spaceship runs out of power, they are stranded at an abandoned space station, pursued by a residing alien.
48	"MacHopper"	Currents and riptides	Doug Booth	November 10, 1993	238-131
Robotnik attempts to brainwash MacHopper, a friend of Sonic's, into doing his bidding, but an explosion causes his memory to become unstable.
49	"Baby-Sitter Jitters"	Babysitting	Jeffrey Scott	November 11, 1993	238-152
Sonic and Tails babysit a trio of unruly beaver infants who end up being abducted by Scratch and Grounder. Robotnik uses the beavers as bait to capture Sonic and Tails, but the beavers become resourceful and help their friends thwart the doctor.
50	"Full Tilt Tails"	Smoking	Robert Askin	November 12, 1993	238-130
Robotnik makes a special type of chewing gum that makes the consumer as fast as Sonic. However, the gum ends up in Tails' possession.
51	"Lifestyles of the Sick and Twisted"	Vandalism	Kevin O'Donnell	November 15, 1993	238-162
When Throbbin Screech features Sonic on his talk show, Lifestyles of the Very Good, Robotnik kidnaps his niece in order to be featured on it.
52	"Road Hog"	Calling for help	Jeffrey Scott	November 16, 1993	238-157
Sonic and Tails are arrested for speeding as a result of Robotnik's latest creation – artificial pollen that induces brainwashing.
53	"The Mobius 5000"	Car safety	Jeffrey Scott	November 17, 1993	238-155
Sonic and Tails enter a car race in order to save an orphanage that Robotnik threatens to put out of business.
54	"Honey, I Shrunk the Hedgehog"	Recycling	Jeffrey Scott	November 18, 1993	238-153
Sonic, Tails and a group of mole miners are hit by Robotnik's shrink ray and must work together to reverse the effects. Note: This episode was inspired by the Honey, I Shrunk the Kids franchise.
55	"Sonic's Song"	Hearing	Donald P. Zappala and Kevin Donahue	November 19, 1993	238-111
Outraged by a popular song about Sonic, Robotnik outlaws all music in Mobius and takes the song's composer captive with the intent of creating his own song.
56	"Sno Problem"	Bicycle maintenance	Sandra Ryan	November 22, 1993	238-125
When Robotnik introduces his "Ultra Freeze-O-Matic" and announcing a plan to freeze every citizen on Mobius so that he can install "Servitude Chips" into the frozen citizens and make them unquestionably obedient, Sonic and Tails must foil it.
57	"Sonic is Running"	Tooth pain	Doug Molitor	November 23, 1993	238-163
When Momma Robotnik threatens her son into campaigning for the Mobius presidency, Sonic decides to run against him.
58	"Mad Mike, Da Bear Warrior"	Medicine	Doug Booth	November 24, 1993	238-134
Robotnik forces a starving village of rabbits into building a statue of himself. With help from Da Bears, Sonic manages to save the day.
59	"Robotnikland"	Cooking	Jeffrey Scott	November 25, 1993	238-154
Robotnik conquers a local amusement park on Sonic's birthday and uses it in an attempt to defeat him.
60	"The Little Merhog"	Matches	Jeffrey Scott	November 26, 1993	238-156
Sonic and Tails help a mermaid-like hedgehog named Merna save her kingdom from the wrath of an evil sea captain.
61	"Robo-Ninjas"	Road safety	Francis Moss	November 29, 1993	238-164
Robotnik captures a martial arts master and uses him to turn Scratch and Grounder into effective ninjas to defeat Sonic.
62	"Fast and Easy"	Breakfast	Bruce Shelly and Reed Shelly	November 30, 1993	238-161
A pickpocket has stolen Robotnik's Chaos Emerald ring, to his chagrin, as Sonic must keep the former safe so that he can discard the ring.
63	"Tails' Tale"	Computers	Bruce Shelly and Reed Shelly	December 1, 1993	238-159
When Sonic mysteriously goes missing, Tails, Professor Von Schlemmer and a pilot named William le Due search for him.
64	"The Robots' Robot"	Fire	Jess Borgeson	December 2, 1993	238-158
Scratch and Grounder build a robot of their own who soon runs away and ends up befriending Sonic.
65	"Hero of the Year"	Alcohol	Bruce Shelly and Reed Shelly	December 3, 1993	238-160
Wes Weasley pretends to host a testimonial event for Sonic that Robotnik uses to force his surrender.

=== Special ===
No.	Title	Written by	Original release date	Prod. code
N–A	"Sonic Christmas Blast"	Bruce Shelly and Reed Shelly	November 24, 1996	N/A
Robotnik disguises himself as Santa Claus in order to force him into retirement and con the children out of presents during Christmas. During a visit to Robotropolis, Sonic and Tails rescue the real Santa Claus, who presents Sonic with a speed run test due to a ring Sally Acorn gave him as a gift serving as a key. After passing the test, Santa chooses Sonic to be his successor. Sonic now becomes Sonic Claus. This special includes aspects of the Saturday-morning Sonic TV show, such as Robotropolis and SWATbots (neither of which appear as they did in that series) and Sally Acorn. Said series had aired concurrently with the original run of "Adventures", but in a different time slot, and had stopped producing new episodes by the time "Christmas Blast" premiered. Despite this, the special maintains the humorous tone of "Adventures" rather than the darker one of the Saturday morning series. Note: The letters page of issue #41 of the Sonic the Hedgehog comic book promotes the special as "An X-Tremely Sonic Christmas" as this episode was originally going to be a tie in for Sonic X-treme on Sega Saturn. However, the game was cancelled, and the title was changed to tie in with Sonic 3D Blast instead.

== Production ==
Adventures of Sonic the Hedgehog was created by DIC Animation City (in association with Sega of America whose CEO Tom Kalinske and newly appointed consumer products director Michealene Risley licensed the characters to DIC), which produced a total of 65 episodes for its one season, and was syndicated by Bohbot Entertainment, later known as BKN International (in the original run, every episode began and ended with the "Bohbot Entertainment Presents" logo), and the Italian Reteitalia S.p.A., part of Fininvest. The show's animation was outsourced to four animation studios:

- the Chinese and Korean subdivisions of Rainbow Animation Group (later renamed Galaxy Digimation, not to be confused with the Italian studio Rainbow S.p.A.),
- the Korean Sae Rom Production (which also at the same time worked on the animation for the Saturday morning Sonic cartoon for ABC),
- the Taiwanese and Chinese Hong Ying Animation (which would later work on the animation for Sonic Underground),
- the Japanese Tokyo Movie Shinsha (more specifically its subsidiary, Telecom Animation Film), which coincidentally would later become part of Sega and produce its own Sonic cartoon, Sonic X.

Additionally, some of the storyboards were done by the Spanish animation studio Milimetros Dibujos Animados, which also worked on the animation for the Saturday morning Sonic cartoon and the main title animation for Sonic Underground. Pre-production stages of the show (as well as the first season of the Saturday morning cartoon) were handled by Canadian Studio B (later known as DHX Media Vancouver).

Tele 5 was already active in co-productions with companies such as BRB Internacional and, through its Italian parent Reteitalia, with DIC. It was one of the Spanish network's last co-productions, before the network announced a creative shift in 1994.

According to Robby London, DIC originally made a deal to produce only the Saturday morning Sonic series for the ABC network, which was originally planned to air in the Fall of 1992, coinciding with the release of Sonic the Hedgehog 2, as well as the original Sonic the Hedgehog 4-issue miniseries by Archie Comics. The cartoon was to be more light-hearted compared to the final product, as reflected by the episode "Heads or Tails", early promotional material found in Fleetway's Sonic the Comic and the early issues of Sonic the Hedgehog comics by Archie, which were based on the Saturday morning Sonic cartoon. However, DIC also wanted to expand the show and produce additional episodes for weekday syndication as well, similar to what DIC has previously done with The Real Ghostbusters, but Mark Pedowitz, ABC's senior vice president of business affairs and contracts, expected Sonic to air exclusively on ABC and rejected the idea, telling London "If you guys want to do syndication, be our guest, go with God, but you won't be on our network." ABC would not agree to the deal until London came up with a proposition that DIC would produce a separate, vastly different Sonic show for syndication instead, the result of which became Adventures of Sonic the Hedgehog. Afterward, ABC was at first willing to air only a single half-hour episode as a prime-time special scheduled for March 1993 (which would become the episode "Heads or Tails") before ultimately delaying it and including it as part of the show which ABC picked up again for a full season, finally airing in the Fall of 1993, alongside Adventures airing in syndication at the same time. After the decision was made to split the show into two different ones, the Saturday morning Sonic cartoon was made darker and more serious in order to distinguish itself from the syndicated Sonic cartoon, which was deliberately made bright, light-hearted and homaging the style, humor and spirit of the classic American theatrical shorts from the golden age of animation, like Looney Tunes, Tom & Jerry, Popeye and Betty Boop. The two shows would be connected through Family Matters star Jaleel White portraying Sonic in both series; ABC itself was airing Family Matters during both shows' run, keeping White busy playing Sonic on two different series alongside his Family Matters role as Steve Urkel.

The theme song is composed by Clark Gassman and it is a combination of the main theme from the 1991 video game as well as In the Hall of the Mountain King by Edvard Grieg and Flight of the Bumblebee by Nikolai Rimsky-Korsakov.

== Broadcast and distribution ==
=== First-run broadcast ===
The series was shown through syndication in the United States in the fall of 1993 on either weekday afternoons or mornings, depending on the TV station. The weekday morning airings in Australia on Seven Network as part of Agro's Cartoon Connection retained the segments. The cartoon was broadcast in the Republic of Ireland on RTÉ Two from 12 September to December 1994 on weekday afternoons with the segments retained also.

=== Rebroadcast ===
USA Network re-aired the original episodes of the show in the United States from 1994 to 1996 (with an additional Christmas special ordered by Sega to be produced for the Christmas season of 1996 to ride on the coattails with the release of Sonic 3D Blast). The series later returned to syndication as part of the BKN block from 1997 to 1998, and later BKN Kids II from 1999 until 2000. Toon Disney would start broadcasting the series in September 1998, and aired on the channel until 2002.

This TV subsequently aired the first 13 episodes of the show from 2010 to 2011 on their Cookie Jar Toons block. 20 episodes of the series were also available on Netflix. From December 2018-November 2020, reruns of the series began airing on Starz. Later starting on September 3, 2019, the show aired its reruns on the streaming service Pluto TV for the first time. In 2024, MeTV Toons aired the Christmas special as part of the network's "Tis' the Season for Toons" event.

=== International airings ===
In Italy, the show aired on Italia 1.

In Spain, the show aired on Telecinco.

The show was re-aired on in Australia on Saturday mornings on Network Ten as part of Cheez TV from 1993 to 1999, and also aired on Nickelodeon and Disney Channel.

In Brazil, the show aired in January 1996, on Rede Globo on the block TV Colosso. Only the first 22 of 65 episodes aired in Brazilian Portuguese, as well as the Christmas special. The show also aired in Sweden on TV3, in Portugal on SIC, in The Netherlands on RTL 4, in Germany on Kabel 1 and RTL II and in 2000 in Arab countries on Spacetoon and Qatar Television.

In September 2003, DIC revealed a new international package consisting of Adventures of Sonic the Hedgehog, Sonic the Hedgehog and the Sonic Christmas Blast special, titled "Totally Sonic!". The package would also feature digitally re-mastered, color-enhanced versions of the shows with new contemporary music, as well as bonus director's cut "Secret Sonic" episodes. The package appears to have never materialized, or at least not in the way originally described with bonus "Secret Sonic" episodes.

In the Philippines, it aired on Yey! in 2020 everyday at 2:00 pm.

=== Home media ===
==== North America ====
In 1994, Buena Vista Home Video through their DIC Toon-Time Video label, released 6 VHS tapes of the series each containing 2 episodes.

Shout! Factory has released all 65 episodes of the series on DVD in Region 1 in three-volume sets. The first volume, released on July 17, 2007, features the first 22 episodes along with two featurettes: "A Conversation With Artist Milton Knight" and "How to Draw Sonic the Hedgehog". The second volume was released on December 9, 2008, and features episodes 23–44 with the featurette "How to Draw Dr. Robotnik". The third volume was available on March 16, 2010 exclusively via Shout! Factory's website as a Shout! Select title and contains the final 21 episodes of the series, plus the "Sonic Christmas Blast" special and the featurette "How to Draw Tails". These episodes were compiled in production order instead of airdate order. All three sets were discontinued in 2012 along with Sonic the Hedgehog and Sonic Underground after Shout!'s deal with Cookie Jar Entertainment expired.

Between 2008 and 2010, NCircle Entertainment released a number of single disc releases of the series, each containing 4 episodes (in random order), as well as two volumes of 4-disc collections in 2012, with each volume containing 16 episodes.

Invincible Pictures re-released the complete series set on August 13, 2019 (originally scheduled for April 9, 2019 and July 16, 2019).

The series, along with its successors Sonic the Hedgehog and Sonic Underground, is available on the streaming services Paramount+ and Tubi, as well as the official WildBrain YouTube channel.

Under license from 41 Entertainment and Invincible Entertainment Partners, Discotek Media released the complete series on standard definition Blu-ray on February 22, 2022. The unaired pilot and the Christmas special Sonic Christmas Blast were included as bonus features, as well as commercial bumpers and commentary by storyboard artist Milton Knight.

==== DVD ====
DVD name	Episodes	Release date
Adventures of Sonic the Hedgehog, Volume 1	1–22	July 17, 2007
Adventures of Sonic the Hedgehog, Volume 2	23–44	December 9, 2008
Adventures of Sonic the Hedgehog, Volume 3	45–65, Sonic Christmas Blast	March 16, 2010
Adventures of Sonic the Hedgehog, Volume 1	1–16	May 22, 2012
Adventures of Sonic the Hedgehog, Volume 2	17–32	October 9, 2012
Adventures of Sonic the Hedgehog: The Complete Animated Series	1–65	August 13, 2019

==== Blu-ray ====
Blu-ray name	Episodes	Release date
Adventures of Sonic the Hedgehog: The Complete Series	1–65, Sonic Christmas Blast, pilot	February 22, 2022

==== United Kingdom ====
Throughout 1993–1994, Abbey Home Entertainment through their Tempo Video label released 8 VHS volumes of the series each containing an assortment of episodes. PolyGram Video through their 4Front Video label would also release a VHS tape of the series in 1997.

In Region 2, Delta Home Entertainment released Adventures of Sonic the Hedgehog: The Complete Series on DVD in the UK on June 25, 2007, as well as a number of single disc releases of the series, each containing 4 episodes (in production order).

==== DVD ====
DVD name	Episodes	Release date
Adventures of Sonic the Hedgehog: The Complete Series	1–65	June 11, 2007
Adventures of Sonic the Hedgehog: Sonic Search & Smash Squad	1–4	2007
Adventures of Sonic the Hedgehog: High Stakes Sonic	5–8	2007
Adventures of Sonic the Hedgehog: Momma Robotnik's Birthday	9–12	2007
Adventures of Sonic the Hedgehog: Best Hedgehog	13–16	2007
Adventures of Sonic the Hedgehog: Over the Hill Hero	17–20	2007

== Reception ==
Adventures of Sonic the Hedgehog received a mixed reception. Randy Miller III of DVDTalk said, "While it's obvious that The Adventures of Sonic the Hedgehog [sic] won't ever be mentioned in the same sentence with Disney, Pixar or Studio Ghibli (except for this one), there's enough goofy fun here to entertain any resident of the 16-bit gaming era". Michael Rubino of DVD Verdict criticized the series for being dated, contrived and bloated with chili dog jokes. GamesRadar listed the series as one of "the worst things to happen to Sonic". It commented that it "made Ren & Stimpy look like a rigid, strictly story-driven opus of animation" and criticized the supporting cast as "wholly uninteresting, unfunny and just all around annoying."

Emily Ashby of Common Sense Media gave the series an overall rating of 3/5 and noted that while its pace is "frantic", "the series emphasizes positive themes for kids about personal safety and interpersonal relationships." Bob Mackey of USgamer wrote that the series' attempts to emulate Looney Tunes and The Ren & Stimpy Show "were done in by the lack of quality control that typically plagued 65-episode syndicated series" and that "the zippy, timing-reliant slapstick Adventures relied on never stood a chance against the animation sweatshops DIC regularly used to pump out their nearly endless supply of televised content.".

Ian Flynn, writer for the Sonic the Hedgehog comic book series by Archie Comics, remarked that Adventures was the closest to "[getting] Sonic right" despite "fail[ing] on the details", although he observed that the series' gags were "polarizing" and that the guest characters "ranged from tired tropes (Breezie) to Saturday Night Live knockoffs (Da Bears)". Pierre DeCelles, who worked on the series as a Senior Animation Director at Hong Ying animation studio, has described it as "fun and humorous".

The series' characterization of Robotnik has become iconic within the Sonic the Hedgehog fandom. His remark, "Snooping as usual, I see?", from the episode "Boogey-Mania" gave rise to the internet meme "pingas", first featured in a 2007 YouTube Poop. The quote has been widely referenced on YouTube in the years since, both in videos and in music remixes, and in the Sonic Boom television series and Archie comic series.

== See also ==
- Dr. Robotnik's Mean Bean Machine
