= The Who's Tommy (original Broadway cast recording) =

The Who's Tommy – Original Cast Recording

Cast recording by various artists
- Released: 1993
- Recorded: 1993
- Studios: The Hit Factory, New York City
- Label: RCA Victor
- Producer: George Martin

The Who's Tommy, subtitled Original Cast Recording, is an album containing a recording of the Who's musical Tommy made by its 1993 Broadway cast and released on RCA Victor in the same year.

== Recording ==
The album was produced by The Beatles producer George Martin.

It was recorded on May 9, 10, and 11, 1993, at The Hit Factory, New York City.

== Critical reception ==
Professional ratings
Review scores
Source	Rating
AllMusic	3/5 stars

In a contemporary review for AllMusic, William Ruhlmann describes the album as "the best recording of [the musical] since the Who did the original". But, he continues, "the bad news is that Townshend has radically rethought his ideas in 24 years, and rewritten nine songs to reflect his many changes of heart. Artists rarely improve their work by changing it years later."

== Track listing ==
2 × CD – RCA Victor 61874

CD 1 (Act 1)
No.	Title	Artist(s)	Length
1.	"Overture"	Orchestra & Bill Buell	4:41
2.	"Captain Walker"	Paul Kandel, Marcia Mitzman, Michael McElroy, Timothy Warmen	1:45
3.	"It's a Boy"	Lisa Leguillou, Marcia Mitzman, Jody Gelb, Pam Klinger, Alice Ripley	0:53
4.	"We've Won"	Donnie Kehr, Jonathan Dokuchitz, Michael Arnold	1:01
5.	"Twenty-One"	Marcia Mitzman, Lee Morgan, Carly Jane Steinborn, Jonathan Dokuchitz	4:14
6.	"Amazing Journey"	Michael Cerveris	3:12
7.	"Courtroom Scene" (dialogue)	Tom Flynn, Bill Buell, Norm Lewis, Marcia Mitzman	1:16
8.	"Sparks"	Orchestra	2:14
9.	"Amazing Journey" (reprise)	Michael Cerveris	1:04
10.	"Christmas" / "See Me, Feel Me"	Jonathan Dokuchitz, Marcia Mitzman, Bill Buell, Jody Gelb & Ensemble / Michael Cerveris	5:04
11.	"Do You Think It's Alright"	Marcia Mitzman, Jonathan Dokuchitz	1:09
12.	"Fiddle About"	Paul Kandel	1:35
13.	"See Me, Feel Me" (reprise)	Michael Cerveris	1:08
14.	"Cousin Kevin"	Anthony Barrile & Ensemble	3:35
15.	"Sensation"	Michael Cerveris & Ensemble	4:14
16.	"Sparks" (reprise)	Orchestra	1:55
17.	"Eyesight to the Blind"	Michael McElroy, Lee Morgan & Ensemble; Lee Morgan (harmonica solo)	2:50
18.	"Acid Queen"	Cheryl Freeman	4:01
19.	"Pinball Wizard"	Donnie Kehr, Christian Hoff, Anthony Barrile & Ensemble	3:50

CD 2 (Act 2)
No.	Title	Artist(s)	Length
1.	"Underture" (Entr'acte)	Ensemble	2:37
2.	"It's a Boy" (reprise) / "There's a Doctor"	Marcia Mitzman, Jonathan Dokuchitz	1:13
3.	"Go to the Mirror" / "Listening to You"	Norm Lewis, Alice Ripley, Marcia Mitzman, Jonathan Dokuchitz / Buddy Smith, Jody Gelb, Tracy Nicole Chapman, Michael Cerveris	3:36
4.	"Tommy, Can You Hear Me?"	Anthony Barrile, Michael Arnold, Paul Dobie, Christian Hoff, Donnie Kehr, Norm Lewis, Michael McElroy, Lee Morgan, Timothy Warmen & Sherie Scott	2:00
5.	"I Believe My Own Eyes"	Jonathan Dokuchitz, Marcia Mitzman	4:01
6.	"Smash the Mirror"	Marcia Mitzman	2:41
7.	"I'm Free"	Michael Cerveris	2:52
8.	"Streets of London 1961–63" (dialogue) / "Miracle Cure"	Paul Kandel / Tom Flynn, Paul Dobie, Timothy Warmen, Michael Arnold, Michael McElroy	0:36
9.	"Sensation" (reprise)	Michael Cerveris & Ensemble	2:21
10.	"I'm Free" / "Pinball Wizard" (Reprise)	Michael Cerveris, Marcia Mitzman, Jonathan Dokuchitz, Anthony Barrile & Ensemble	3:55
11.	"Tommy's Holiday Camp"	Paul Kandel	1:57
12.	"Sally Simpson"	Anthony Barrile, Sherie Scott, Paul Kandel, Bill Buell, Pam Klinger, Security Guards	3:35
13.	"Welcome"	Michael Cerveris & Ensemble	3:20
14.	"Sally Simpson's Question"	Sherie Scott, Michael Cerveris	1:13
15.	"We're Not Gonna Take It"	Michael Cerveris & Ensemble	3:03
16.	"See Me, Feel Me" (reprise) / "Listening to You" (reprise)	Michael Cerveris & Buddy Smith / Michael Cerveris & Company	5:07

- Musical director: Joseph Church

== Awards ==
Year	Award type	Categories	Results	Ref.
1994	Grammy Awards	Best Musical Show Album	Won	
