= Manic Hedgehog =

Manic Hedgehog may refer to:

- Manic Hedgehog, a 1991 demo tape by Radiohead, named after an Oxford record shop
- Manic, a hedgehog character from Sonic Underground
