= East Village Opera Company =

American rock band

The East Village Opera Company

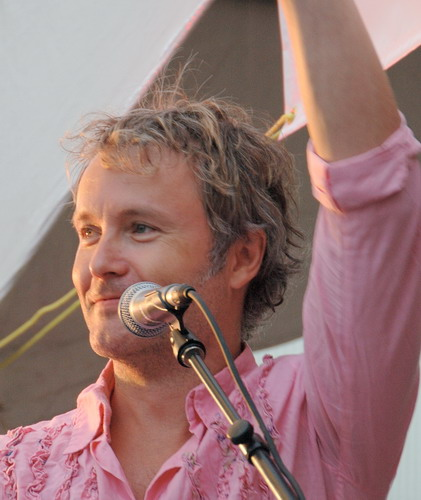
Keyboardist Peter Kiesewalter at the Ottawa Chamber Music Festival 2006

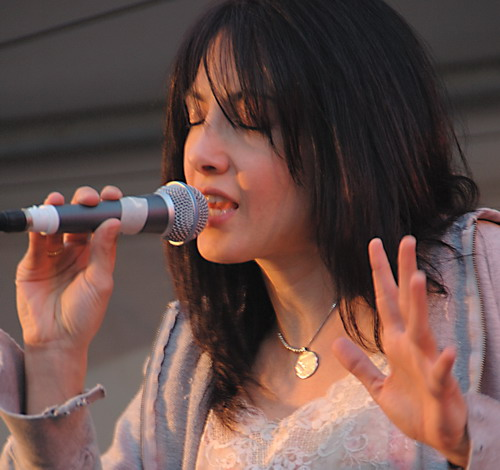
Vocalist AnnMarie Milazzo performs at the Ottawa Chamber Music Festival 2006

AnnMarie Milazzo and Tyley Ross

The East Village Opera Company (EVOC) is a rock group co-founded by vocalist Tyley Ross and arranger/multi-instrumentalist Peter Kiesewalter, both Canadians. Vocalist AnnMarie Milazzo was then recruited to provide female vocals. EVOC includes eight other members: two guitarists, a bassist, a percussionist, and a string quartet. EVOC could be described as a cover band whose niche is traditional operatic pieces that are then arranged to reflect more modern musical stylings.

EVOC has been on hiatus since 2010 as Kiesewalter started work on a new project he calls Brooklyn Rundfunk Orkestrata (BRO) to cover songs from The Sound of Music with the Rodgers and Hammerstein Organization.

== Discography ==
=== La Donna ===
In 2004, EVOC released their first album, La Donna, under the Canal Records label. On this album, Ross and Kiesewalter fuse classic Italian arias and Neapolitan folk songs with "unabashed 70's arena rock, sultry bossa nova, four-on-the-floor disco, and celtic and bluegrass-tinged ambience." It was arranged and produced by Peter Kiesewalter, vocal arrangements by Tyley Ross, mixed by Wayne Bartlett at Bartmart Audio, Ottawa, and mastered by Steve Fallone at Sterling Sound, New York. Behind the duo are over twenty musicians, including guitarist Vernon Reid (Living Colour), banjo master Tony Trishka, Blue Man Group music director Byron Estep, and a string ensemble from the National Arts Centre Orchestra of Canada.

La Donna found its launching point as the soundtrack for Derek Diorio's 2001 film, The Kiss of Debt. The comedic film stars Ernest Borgnine as the godfather and self-proclaimed opera aficionado, and Tyley Ross, as Tino Moriano, the talented young tenor aspiring to sing with The Continental Opera Company. Ross performs "Panis angelicus" and "Ave Maria", from La Donna, and the rest of the tracks are background music to the fanciful storyline.

The CD contains the following tracks:

1. "Vesti la giubba" – Ruggero Leoncavallo
2. "Una furtiva lagrima" – Gaetano Donizetti
3. "La Danza" – Gioachino Rossini
4. "M'apparì tutt'amor" – Friedrich von Flotow
5. "Maria, Mari" – Eduardo di Capua
6. "La Paloma" – Sebastián Yradier
7. "La donna è mobile" – Giuseppe Verdi
8. "Panis angelicus" – César Franck
9. "Questa o quella" – Giuseppe Verdi
10. "La Serenata" – Paolo Tosti
11. "Ave Maria" – Franz Schubert

=== The East Village Opera Company ===
EVOC's second, self-titled album was released September 27, 2005 on the Decca Records label. The album was produced and recorded by Neil Dorfsman, a Grammy Award winner who has worked with notable artists such as Sting and Paul McCartney, and group acts like Dire Straits. Symphonic portions were performed by the Czech Philharmonic.

The CD contains the following tracks:

1. Le nozze di Figaro Redux – Wolfgang Amadeus Mozart
2. "Nessun dorma" Redux – Giacomo Puccini
3. "Flower Duet" Redux – Léo Delibes
4. "La donna è mobile" Redux – Giuseppe Verdi
5. "Un bel dì" Redux – Giacomo Puccini
6. "Au fond du temple saint" Redux – Georges Bizet
7. "O mio babbino caro" Redux – Giacomo Puccini
8. "Ebben? Ne andrò lontana" Redux – Alfredo Catalani
9. "Che gelida manina" Redux – Giacomo Puccini
10. "Habanera" Redux – Georges Bizet
11. "When I Am Laid in Earth" Redux – Henry Purcell
12. "E lucevan le stelle" Redux Giacomo Puccini

=== Olde School ===
EVOC's latest release, Olde School, debuted in August 2008. Produced, arranged and orchestrated by Peter Kiesewalter and mixed by Neil Dorfsman at Saint Claire Studios near Lexington, Kentucky, Olde School received a 2009 Grammy nomination for Best Classical Crossover Album.

The CD contains the following tracks:

1. "The Ride from Die Walküre" – Richard Wagner
2. "King^{sic} of the Night" from Die Zauberflöte – Wolfgang Amadeus Mozart
3. "Help Me (Jove, In Pity)" from Semele – George Frideric Handel
4. "Brindisi" / "Libera" (Pop the Cork) from La traviata – Giuseppe Verdi
5. "Gloria" from Griselda – Giovanni Bononcini
6. "Walk" from Semele – George Frideric Handel
7. "As You Were Then" from Norma – Vincenzo Bellini
8. "Soldiers" from Faust – Charles Gounod
9. "You're Not Alone" from "Was mir behagt, ist nur die muntre Jagd, BWV 208" – Johann Sebastian Bach
10. "Va Tosca" from Tosca – Giacomo Puccini
11. "Butterfly Duet" from Madama Butterfly – Giacomo Puccini

== Comparisons ==
EVOC's music has drawn comparisons to other contemporary artists in pop culture including the Trans-Siberian Orchestra, Mannheim Steamroller, or Metallica's S&M (Symphony and Metallica) album.

== Notable performances ==
- Remember Me in collaboration with Parsons Dance Company (on tour)
- Jockey Club del Perú, Lima, Peru, September 2008
- Royal Ontario Museum Re-opening Gala, Toronto, Ontario, June 2007
- Vértice de la Cultura del Museo de La Nación, Lima, Peru, April 2007
- Miss USA 2006, in Baltimore, Maryland.
- New York City Opera Opening Night Gala, 2005 and 2006
- A&E's Breakfast with the Arts, December 25, 2005
- Mod Club Theatre, Toronto, Ontario, 2005

== Quotes and press ==
- "The group's charisma is inescapable and infectious, they electrify the classics for a new generation" – Time Out, New York
- "Opera buffs are likely to find joy, because the tunes aren't bastardized, but electrified." – New York Post
- "East Village Opera dishes out classic favorites with a startling new twist", Chicago Tribune, 6 October 2006
- "In East Village Opera Company's Hands, Puccini Rocks the House", Lexington Herald-Leader (Lexington, Ky.), 6 June 2006
- "Feature Artist – EVOC: Romantic Rock" – The Music Edge, 23 March 2006
- "Rocking the Classics" – Gay City News, 29 September 2005
- "Group takes riff on opera" – The Washington Times, 28 September 2005

== Other information ==
- EVOC made their debut performance in March 2004 at Joe's Pub in Manhattan
- Even though Kiesewalter and Ross both grew up in Ottawa, Ontario, they knew each other only through friends, and had never before collaborated professionally until 2001, on the film The Kiss of Debt.
- Kiesewalter is the musical arranger and a solo instrumentalist in NYC's The Downtown Messiah, in which AnnMarie Milazzo also has performed. Incidentally, this is where Kiesewalter and Milazzo met.
- Kiesewalter is not an opera buff per se. Kiesewalter was noted as saying "I've never been an opera fan. Yet the more I listened to opera, the more the melodies cried out. These arias, in essence, are pop tunes that have stood the test of time."
- Ross became a self-proclaimed fan of opera, during his three-month immersion in the genre, in preparation for his work on The Kiss of Debt.
- After seeing Tyley Ross' performance as the lead in Peter Townshend's Tommy, CTV National anchor Sandie Rinaldo loved the performance so much, she named her new dog "Tyley."
- Overture from Le nozze di Figaro incorporates the keyboard solo from The Who's "Won't Get Fooled Again", and "Che gelida manina" from La bohème styles its guitar after U2.
