= The Last Ship (musical) =

Musical by Sting

- Official poster of 2026 production
- Music: Sting
- Lyrics: Sting
- Book: John Logan (original book); Brian Yorkey (original book); Barney Norris; Lorne Campbell
- Productions: 2014 Chicago; 2014 Broadway; 2016 Salt Lake City; 2016 UK national tour 2019 Toronto; 2020 US national tour 2026 World Tour

The Last Ship is an original musical with music and lyrics by Sting.

Inspired by Sting's own childhood experiences and the shipbuilding industry in Wallsend, Tyne and Wear, the musical with book by John Logan and Brian Yorkey played at the Bank of America Theatre in Chicago, before moving to the Neil Simon Theatre on Broadway in 2014. The musical received two Tony Award nominations in 2015, for Best Original Score and Best Orchestrations.

The musical was later significantly revised. Following a UK national tour and subsequent six-week run at the Princess of Wales Theatre in Toronto, it embarked on a US national tour with the official opening at the Ahmanson Theatre, Los Angeles on 22 January 2020.

== Premise ==
The Last Ship was initially inspired by Sting's 1991 album The Soul Cages and Sting's own childhood experiences, particularly his relationship with his father who had been an engineer in a family of shipwrights. It tells the story about community and the demise of the shipbuilding industry in Wallsend, Tyne and Wear, with the closure of the town's Swan Hunter shipyard. "I did everything in my power to escape Wallsend... I became successful, but I owe a debt to that community. This play is me trying to honour that community, trying to pay back what they gave me -- a sense of self but also the engine that allowed me to escape. That's the strange paradox. I love where I come from, I'm glad I escaped, at the same time I need to tell that story as a sort of 'soul debt'."

== Production history ==
In September 2011, it was confirmed that British musician Sting was working on a musical, following rumours the previous year. A first reading took place in Manhattan in October that year, with a further reading in Newcastle in February 2012 and ultimately a full staged reading for the musical was held in 2013. In September 2013, the show was officially confirmed and it was announced that the show would premiere in Chicago in 2014.

The Original Broadway show has a book by John Logan and Brian Yorkey and is directed by Joe Mantello, with choreography by Steven Hoggett, set and costume design by David Zinn, lighting design by Christopher Akerlind and sound design by Brian Ronan.

The show was produced again 2018 this time with book and directed by Lorne Campell, with movement direction by Lucy Hind, musical director by Richard John, orchestrations by Rob Mathes, lighting design by Matt Daw costume design by Molly Einchcomb and designed by 59 Productions.

The show features a score by Sting that includes mostly original material, as well as four previously written songs: "Island of Souls" and "All This Time" from The Soul Cages, "When We Dance" from the 1994 album Fields of Gold: The Best of Sting 1984–1994, and "Ghost Story" from the 1999 album Brand New Day. Speaking in 2011, Brian Yorkey said: "He's writing great theater music... It's very, very distinctly Sting but it also is theatre music. It's not just pop music transposed into the theatre."

The Last Ship is Sting's first stage musical. He had previously co-written the score for the 2000 animated Disney musical film The Emperor's New Groove, although only two of his songs ended up in the film after heavy studio retooling.

Sting's eleventh studio album, titled The Last Ship, featuring music from, or originally intended for, the musical, was released on 24 September 2013. The album marked his first release of original material since his 2003 album Sacred Love and his first foray into musical theatre. Sting had suffered from writer's block and credited the show with giving him a reason to write songs again. Sting held a series of concerts at The Public Theater in October 2013, featuring music from the show and told stories of the making of the musical. The concert was later broadcast on PBS as part of its Great Performances series.

After the "unsurprising" closure of the Broadway run of the show, many observers commented that Newcastle or another venue in the UK would have been "a more natural home" for the show, which was "a tough sell" for the US. "Tyneside accents and the decline of Britain’s industrial heartland aren’t naturally in the wheelhouse of Manhattan’s jewellery-rattling theatregoers." Sting has been dismissive of the argument.

The musical was produced later in the UK, with a new book. One of the major changes in the new production was the removal of the significant figure of a priest, as well as many religious references.

In 2026, a world tour of a revised version, starring Sting as Jackie White, went to Amsterdam, Paris, Brisbane and New York. The book was revised by Barney Norris.

== Roles and principal casts ==
Character	Chicago (2014)	Original Broadway cast (2014)	UK/Ireland tour cast (2018)	Toronto cast (2019)	National tour cast (2020)	2026 World Tour (2026)
Gideon Fletcher	Michael Esper	Michael Esper	Richard Fleeshman	Oliver Savile	Oliver Savile	Declan Bennett
Jackie White	Jimmy Nail^{a}	Jimmy Nail^{a}	Joe McGann	Sting	Sting	Sting
Peggy White	Sally Ann Triplett	Sally Ann Triplett	Charlie Hardwick	Jackie Morrison	Jackie Morrison	Annette McLaughlin
Meg Dawson	Rachel Tucker	Rachel Tucker	Frances McNamee	Frances McNamee	Frances McNamee	Lauren Samuels
Joe Fletcher^{b}	Jamie Jackson	Jamie Jackson	Sean Kearns	Sean Kearns	Sean Kearns	—N/a
Tom Dawson & Young Gideon	Collin Kelly-Sordelet	Collin Kelly-Sordelet	Matt Corner	Barney Wilkinson	Joseph Peacock	
Young Meg	Dawn Cantwell	Dawn Cantwell	Parisa Shahmir	Jade Sophia Vertannes	Jade Sophia Vertannes	—N/a
Billy Thompson	Craig Bennett	Craig Bennett	Joe Caffrey	Joe Caffrey	Joe Caffrey	Joe Caffrey
Davey Harrison	Matthew Stocke	Matthew Stocke	Kevin Wathen	Kevin Wathen	Matt Corner	Marc Akinforlarin
Freddy Newlands^{b}	Eric Anderson	Eric Anderson	Sean Kearns	Sean Kearns	Sean Kearns	Mathew Craig
Adrian Sanderson	Rich Hebert	Rich Hebert	Charlie Richmond	Marc Akinfolarin	Marc Akinfolarin	Lemuel Knights
Beatrice Dees	Shawna M. Hamic	Shawna M. Hamic	Annie Grace	Orla Gormley	Orla Gormley	—N/a
Ellen Dawson	—N/a	—N/a	Katie Moore	Sophie Reid	Sophie Reid	Hannah Richardson
Baroness Tynedale	—N/a	—N/a	Penelope Woodman	Annie Grace	Annie Grace	Cassiopeia Berkeley-Agyepong
Father James O'Brien	Fred Applegate	Fred Applegate	—N/a	—N/a	—N/a	—N/a
Arthur Millburn	Aaron Lazar	Aaron Lazar	—N/a	—N/a	—N/a	—N/a
Jessie Flynn	Leah Hocking	Leah Hocking	—N/a	—N/a	—N/a	—N/a
Sailor	Drew McVety	Drew McVety	—N/a	—N/a	—N/a	—N/a
Ferryman	—N/a	—N/a	—N/a	—N/a	—N/a	Shaggy / Lejaun Sheppard

- ^aThe show’s composer/lyricist Sting replaced Nail as Jackie White from 9 December 2014 until the show's Broadway closing on 25 January 2015.
- ^bSince the 2018 UK tour production, the roles of Joe Fletcher and Freddy Newlands have been played by the same actor.

== Music ==
=== Musical numbers ===
The following is the list of musical numbers in the Broadway production. The musical uses a twelve-member orchestra consisting of keyboard, piano, guitar, bass, drums, Northumbrian smallpipe, flute, whistle, melodeon, fiddle, cello and percussion.

Act l

- "Island of Souls" – Jackie White, Young Gideon, Peggy White, Father O'Brien, Young Meg, Company
- "All This Time" – Gideon Fletcher
- "August Winds" – Meg Dawson, Young Meg
- "Shipyard" – Jackie White, Billy Thompson, Peggy White, Father O'Brien, Company
- "If You Ever See Me Talking to a Sailor" – Meg Dawson, Women
- "Dead Man's Boots" – Gideon Fletcher, Joe Fletcher, Young Gideon
- "The Last Ship (Part One)" – Father O'Brien
- "Sail Away" – Peggy White
- "The Last Ship (Part Two)" – Jackie White, Father O'Brien, Company
- "What Say You, Meg?" – Arthur Millburn
- "We've Got Now't Else" – Jackie White, Davy Harrison, Billy Thompson, Tom Dawson, Shipyard Men
- "When We Dance" – Gideon Fletcher, Meg Dawson, Arthur Millburn
- "The Last Ship (Reprise)" – Gideon Fletcher, Jackie White, Father O'Brien, Company

Act ll

- "Mrs. Dees' Rant" – Mrs. Dees, Women
- "The Night the Pugilist Learned How to Dance" – Gideon Fletcher, Tom Dawson
- "We've Got Now't Else (Reprise)" – Jackie White, Gideon Fletcher, Company
- "So to Speak" – Father O'Brien, Gideon Fletcher
- "Hymn" – Company
- "Show Some Respect" – Peggy White, Gideon Fletcher, Jackie White, Meg Dawson, Company
- "Island of Souls (Reprise)" – Meg Dawson, Young Gideon, Young Meg, Gideon Fletcher
- "It's Not the Same Moon" – Gideon Fletcher, Meg Dawson
- "Underground River" – Jackie White, Tom Dawson, Company
- "Ghost Story" – Gideon Fletcher, Tom Dawson
- "August Winds (Reprise)" – Gideon Fletcher, Tom Dawson
- "The Last Ship (Finale)" – Company

Toronto (2019)

Act l

- "In the Morning" – Company
- "We've Got Now't Else (Overture)" – Jackie White and Company
- "Island of Souls" – Company
- "And Yet" – Gideon Fletcher and Ferryman
- "Shipyard" – Jackie White, Billy Thompson, Adrian Sanderson, Peggy White, Davey Harrison and Company
- "Sail Away" – Peggy White
- "If You Ever See Me Talking to a Sailor" – Meg Dawson and the women of the Company
- "Underground River" – Billy Thompson and Company
- "Underground River (Reprise)" – Billy Thompson and Company
- "Dead Man's Boots" – Gideon Fletcher, Old Joe Fletcher and Young Gideon
- "When the Pugilist Learned to Dance" – Gideon Fletcher and Ellen Dawson
- "August Winds" – Meg Dawson
- "The Last Ship (Part One)" – Jackie White, Peggy White, Davey Harrison and Company

Act ll

- "Mrs. Dees' Rant" – Mrs. Dees and the Women of the Company
- "It's Not the Same Moon" – Meg Dawson and Ellen Dawson
- "All This Time" – Ellen Dawson
- "So to Speak" – Jackie White and Peggy White
- "What Say You Meg?" – Gideon Fletcher and Meg Dawson
- "The Last Ship (Reprise)" – Jackie White and Company
- "Hadaway (Out of Your Tiny Minds)" – Davey Harrison and Company
- "Underground River (Reprise)" – Peggy White and Jackie White
- "When We Danced" – Gideon Fletcher and Meg Dawson
- "We've Got Now't Else (Reprise)" – Peggy White and Company
- "Show Some Respect" – Peggy White and Company
- "The Last Ship (Finale)" – Company

=== Original Broadway cast album ===
The Last Ship (Original Broadway Cast Recording)

Soundtrack album cast recording by Various
- Released: 16 December 2014
- Studio: Avatar Studios
- Producer: Rob Mathes

The original Broadway cast recording was released on 16 December 2014.

No.	Title	Length
1.	"Island of Souls"	6.35
2.	"All This Time"	3.17
3.	"August Winds"	2.26
4.	"Shipyard"	5.42
5.	"If You Ever See Me Talking to a Sailor"	4.13
6.	"Dead Man's Boots"	2.55
7.	"The Last Ship (Part One)"	2.10
8.	"Sail Away"	2.11
9.	"The Last Ship (Part Two)"	2.37
10.	"What Say You Meg?"	3.53
11.	"We’ve Got Now’t Else"	3.26
12.	"When We Dance"	4.25
13.	"Mrs. Dees' Rant"	2.51
14.	"The Night the Pugilist Learned How to Dance"	4.06
15.	"So To Speak"	3.17
16.	"Show Some Respect"	4.03
17.	"It's Not the Same Moon"	4.28
18.	"Underground River"	2.37
19.	"Ghost Story"	4.43
20.	"The Last Ship (Finale)"	2.05
21.	"What Say You Meg? (Bonus track)"	4.02

== Productions ==
=== Chicago and Broadway ===
On 19 September 2013, it was announced that the show would begin its world premiere with a pre-Broadway Chicago tryout. Tickets for the tryout went on sale on 14 February 2014. Previews for the Chicago run of the show began on 10 June 2014 at the Bank of America Theatre, the show opened on 25 June 2014, and played for 33 days total until 13 July 2014.

Following completion of the tryout in Chicago, The Last Ship transferred to the Neil Simon Theatre on Broadway in New York. Previews started playing at the Neil Simon Theater on 29 September 2014, and the official opening night was 26 October 2014. Sting joined the cast on stage during the curtain call on opening night. Celebrities including Billy Joel, Robert De Niro and Liam Neeson were in attendance. In a bid to help falling ticket sales, creator and musician Sting joined the cast for a limited run from 9 December 2014 to 24 January 2015, replacing Jimmy Nail.

Despite sales increasing with Sting in the cast and producers stating he had had a "galvanising effect", the decision was made to close the show on 24 January 2015.

=== Salt Lake City ===
The Last Ship was produced in Salt Lake City, Utah, at the Roy W. and Elizabeth E. Simmons Pioneer Memorial Theatre at the University of Utah campus from 16 September 2016 through 1 October 2016, making its regional premiere in Salt Lake City in the first production after its Broadway run.

On 22 September, Sting joined the cast at the curtain call of that evening's performance, After a standing ovation, Sting thanked the "amazing cast" and said it was "surreal" to see the story of his English shipbuilding home transported to the middle of Utah.

"I loved the reaction," he said. "I loved sitting among you all and hearing you laugh and hearing you cry."

=== Turku, Finland ===
A new (non-replica) production of The Last Ship (fin. Viimeinen Laiva) opened in Turku, Finland, on 15 September 2017 at Turku City Theatre. The full show was performed in the Finnish language. Turku is a very famous shipbuilding city in Finland. One of the world's biggest cruise ships, the Royal Caribbean Oasis of the Seas, was built at the Turku shipyard.

=== United Kingdom and Ireland ===
In October 2017, it was announced The Last Ship would be embark on a UK and Ireland tour, beginning at Northern Stage in Newcastle upon Tyne 12 March 2018, closing 7 July 2018 at Lyric Theatre, part of The Lowry in Salford. The production features a new book by director Lorne Campbell. Notable casting included Joe McGann as Jackie White, Richard Fleeshman as Gideon Fletcher, Charlie Hardwick as Peggy White and Francess McNamee as Meg Dawson. Jimmy Nail had been due to reprise the role he created on Broadway of Jackie White, however negotiations stalled and his offer to perform on the tour was withdrawn.

=== Toronto ===
The show ran in Toronto, Ontario, at the Princess of Wales Theatre between 9 February and 24 March 2019 directed by Lorne Campbell. The production featured a new cast, including Sting as Jackie White.

=== US tour ===
The US tour of The Last Ship debuted on January 22 at the Ahmanson Theatre in Los Angeles. The musical then moved to San Francisco, opening on February 25 at the Golden Gate Theatre. The US tour, however, was then suspended due to the COVID-19 pandemic. The tour was scheduled to stop in Washington, D.C., Minneapolis, and Detroit through April 2020.

=== Germany ===
The Theatre of West Pomerania and Theater Koblenz rescheduled their productions of The Last Ship in 2021 after the 2020 versions were cancelled due to the COVID-19 pandemic. The Theatre Lübeck had Premiere of their production, fully in German on 11 February 2022.

=== Norway ===
A (non-replica) production of The Last Ship (Broadway version) opened in Kolbotn, Norway, on October 17, 2024 by Scenario at Kolben Kulturhus. The full show was performed in Norwegian. Casting included William Iversen as Gideon Fletcher, Martine Aurora Andersen as Meg Dawson, Sven Torneberg as Jackie White, and Tom-Erik Falla as Father O'Brien.

=== Denmark ===
A new (non-replica) production of The Last Ship (Broadway version) opened in Copenhagen, Denmark, on February 21, 2025 at Østre Gasværk Theater. The full show was performed in Danish and received raving reviews. Casting included Niels Skovgaard Andersen as Gideon Fletcher, Kristine Yde Eriksen as Meg Dawson, Morten Lützhøft as Jackie White, Xenia Lach-Nielsen as Meg and Jon Lange as Billy Thompson.

== Awards ==
Year	Award Ceremony	Category	Nominee	Result
2015	Drama Desk Awards	Outstanding Choreography	Steven Hoggett	Nominated
2015	Drama Desk Awards	Outstanding Music	Sting	Nominated
2015	Drama Desk Awards	Outstanding Orchestrations	Rob Mathes	Nominated
2015	Drama Desk Awards	Outstanding Sound Design in a Musical	Brian Ronan	Nominated
2015	Outer Critics Circle Awards	Outstanding New Broadway Musical		Nominated
2015	Outer Critics Circle Awards	Outstanding Book of a Musical	John Logan; Brian Yorkey	Nominated
2015	Outer Critics Circle Awards	Outstanding New Score	Sting	Nominated
2015	Tony Awards	Best Original Score	Sting	Nominated
2015	Tony Awards	Best Orchestrations	Rob Mathes	Nominated
