= Matthew Stocke =

American stage and television actor (born 1971)

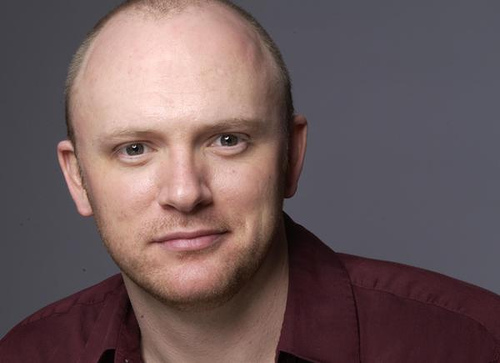
- Born: December 21, 1971 (age 54); Pittsburgh, Pennsylvania, United States

Matthew Stocke (born December 21, 1971) is an American stage and television actor. His hometown is Pittsburgh, Pennsylvania. He moved to New York City in 1996 as he began his professional career and educational company. He graduated from the Carnegie Mellon College of Fine Arts in 1995 with a BFA in Acting/Musical Theatre, where he occasionally returns as a guest instructor.

== Professional career ==
=== Television work ===
Throughout his career, Stocke has made numerous appearances on the Tony Awards and The Today Show and has made guest appearances on the television shows "30 Rock", "The Sopranos", "Conviction", "Law & Order", "Law & Order: SVU", and "Chappelle's Show". Most recently, Stocke appeared as the Technician in two episodes of The Americans ("The Oath" and "The Colonel") on the FX Network.

=== Theatre work ===
Stocke's voice can be heard on the original cast recordings for Giant, The Wedding Singer, The Boy from Oz, and The Full Monty, plus The Dirty Sock Funtime Band's debut album "The Search and Rescue of Genius Backpack" by Create-A-Play and BC/EFA's "Broadway's Greatest Gifts: Carols for a Cure" Volumes 3, 5, & 8.

Stocke made his Broadway debut in the 1998 musical production of Titanic and later went on tour with the show's National Tour Cast. He was in the original production of The Full Monty in 2000, where he was a swing and understudied the role of Jerry Lukowski. Jerry Lukowski was played by his college roommate and current close friend Patrick Wilson. At Great Britain's Royal Variety Performance, Matt bared it all as Jerry for Queen Elizabeth II during The Full Monty's final number, "Let It Go." In 2003, he joined the original cast of The Boy from Oz, in which he kissed leading man Hugh Jackman. In 2006, he was a part of the original cast for The Wedding Singer, in which he understudied the roles of Sammy, Robbie Hart, played by Stephen Lynch, and Glen Guglia, played by Richard H. Blake.

In early 2007, he appeared in Donnie Kehr's show Rockers On Broadway: Jersey Style and participated in an informal reading of Grumpy Old Men: The Musical. Stocke then originated the role of the Witch's Father/Ozian Official (Frexspar the Godly) for the Los Angeles company of Wicked, which opened on February 10, 2007. He understudied for both John Rubinstein as The Wizard and Timothy Britten Parker as Doctor Dillamond. He shared his two understudy duties with Brian Munn, who also understudied for him. His track in the show included the new Shiz University professor who takes over for Doctor Dillamond (Doctor Nikidik), the Yak at the train station, the "Big Green Guard" in the Emerald City who shouts "The Wizard will see you now!", and an Ozian Official. Matt also led weekly tours of Wicked LA's Behind the Emerald Curtain, which takes fans behind-the-scenes to see what the making of musicals is all about. Matt left the Wicked LA company on February 10, 2008, exactly a year after Wicked LA (previews) began, and was replaced by Tim Talman.

From March 12 to April 20, 2008, Matt originated the roles of Barstow, Mr. Simms, Dr. Vinton, and Camp Director in the musical version of the 1985 film Mask, which made its world premiere at the Pasadena Playhouse. Stocke then appeared in the original Off-Broadway cast of Road Show (formerly called Bounce) with Michael Cerveris and Alexander Gemignani, which played at New York's Public Theater from October 28-December 28, 2008. The show featured music and lyrics by Stephen Sondheim and the tells the story of two brothers whose quest for the American dream turns into a test of morality and judgment that changes their lives in unexpected ways.

Stocke joined the ensemble of Rock of Ages on October 6, 2009 as an understudy for the roles of Lonny, Dennis, and Hertz. With the company, he participated in the Golden Mullet Awards on October 26, 2009, VH1's Save the Music campaign (Restore Instrumental Music at School) at PS/IS111 on November 13, 2009, New Yorkers for Children: Wrap to Rap event on November 17, 2009 at Madison Square Garden, and Taste of Times Square on June 7, 2010 at the Hard Rock Cafe. Stocke also appears on the "Men of Rock of Ages" 2010 calendar. His left the show on January 9, 2011, which was the date of the company's temporary closing before moving to the Helen Hayes Theatre, but returned to cover the role of Hertz from February 7 to March 11, 2013.

In 2012, Stocke appeared as Mike in the Off-Broadway production of Giant. The show featured Brian d'Arcy James and Kate Baldwin and played at The Public's Newman Theatre from October 26, 2012 through December 2, 2012, with an official press opening on November 13, 2012. He originated the same role during the production's earlier run at Dallas Theater Center from January 18, 2012 to February 19, 2012.

In January 2013, Stocke participated in a reading of The First Gentleman with Sally Struthers.

Stocke performed in a one-night only benefit concert of The Pirates of Penzance at the Public Theatre on June 10, 2013.

Stocke joins the original cast of The Last Ship, which is currently playing at the Bank of America Theatre in Chicago before transferring to the Neil Simon Theatre on Broadway in Fall 2014.

== Miscellaneous ==
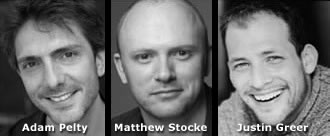
Moveable Arts Directors

Stocke, along with Adam Pelty and Justin Greer, founded and launched Moveable Arts, an educational company based in New York which focused on teaching young individuals who sought professional careers in the performance industry. The company hosted retreats and workshops each year which guided individuals through everything from the audition process to getting headshots and financial topics. Professional performers in TV, film, and Broadway were brought in as educators during these events.

Stocke participated in the 2002 National Kidney Foundation U.S. Transplant Games in Orlando, Florida and in the New York City Half Marathon on July 27, 2008. He recently founded a media training company, GhostLite Media, and regularly performs with Patrick Wilson's Van Halen cover band, The Wilson Van.
