= Tyley Ross =

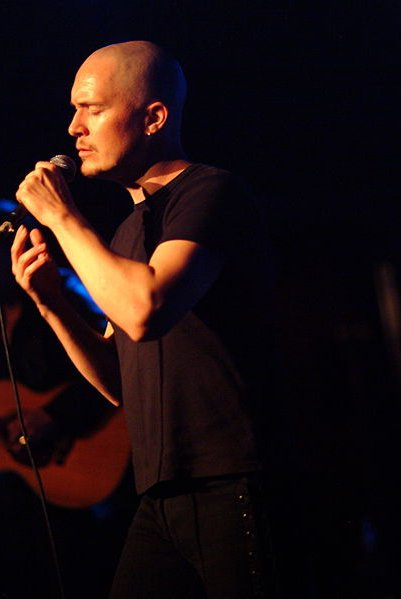
- Ross performing with the East Village Opera Company.

Background information
- Occupations: Singer, actor, teacher
- Instrument: Vocals
- Years active: 1994–present
- Member of: East Village Opera Company
- Website: tyleyross.com

Tyley Ross is a Grammy-nominated Canadian recording artist, the co-founder of the Universal Records recording act The East Village Opera Company, and a Dora Award-winning musical theater actor. He is based in New York City.

== Biography ==
Ross began his career as a street busker before becoming a cartoon and voice artist, rock singer, and an actor for the small and large screen. Discovered by Pete Townshend in 1994, Ross was cast in the title role for the Canadian premiere of The Who's Tommy, for which he was honored with the Dora Award for Outstanding Performance in a Musical. He spent the next ten years on musical stages across North America, starring in roles at such venues as the Stratford Festival (Tony in West Side Story), Shaw Festival (Franklin in Merrily We Roll Along), and on Broadway (Chris in Miss Saigon). During this time, Ross also wrote and recorded two CDs of original music, and was a frequent guest soloist with a number of leading orchestras in Canada and the United States. In 1999, he was the singing voice of Manic in the television series Sonic Underground.

Ross is currently an adjunct instructor of voice at NYU's Tisch and Steinhardt schools. He has led voice workshops in Canada, Mexico, the UK, South Korea and throughout the USA.

== East Village Opera Company ==
In 2004 Ross co-founded the genre-defying East Village Opera Company and spent the next six years as the group's male lead singer. The band was signed to Decca/Universal for five years, and during that time he released three CDs: La Donna, East Village Opera Company, and Olde School - for which he was nominated for a 2009 Grammy Award for Classical Crossover Album of the Year. Ross toured worldwide with EVOC and appeared on many national and international television broadcasts including the 2008 Miss USA Pageant (NBC), and two PBS specials: EVOC live in Saint Louis, and Remember Me – a multi-disciplinary collaboration he co-created with choreographer David Parsons.

== Education ==
- Master's Degree in Voice Studies, University of London's Central School of Speech and Drama
- Advanced Certificate in Vocal Pedagogy, New York University
- Vocology Certificate, University of Iowa/University of Utah.

== Associations ==
- New York Singing Teachers' Association (NYSTA)
- National Association of Teachers of Singing (NATS)
- Voice & Speech Trainers Association (VASTA)
- Screen Actors Guild/American Federation of Television and Radio Artists (SAG/AFTRA)
- Actors' Equity Association (AEA)

== Awards ==
- Won the 1995 DORA Award for Best Actor in a Musical, for his performance as the title character in The Who's Tommy.
- Nominated for the Outstanding Actor in a Leading Role Jessie Award in 1998, for his performance in Joey Shine.
- Nominated for the 2004 DORA Award for Best Actor in a Musical, for his performance of Jamie in The Last Five Years.
- Nominated for the 2009 Grammy Award for Best Classical Crossover Album with the East Village Opera Company, for their album Olde School.

== Discography ==
- Treading Water (1997)
- Tyley Ross (1999)
- The East Village Opera Company: La Donna (2004)
- The East Village Opera Company (2005)
- The East Village Opera Company: Olde School (2008)
