= Armored Car Robbery =

1950 film by Richard Fleischer

- Theatrical release poster
- Directed by: Richard Fleischer
- Screenplay by: Gerald Drayson Adams; Earl Felton
- Story by: Robert Leeds; Robert Angus
- Produced by: Herman Schlom
- Starring: Charles McGraw; Adele Jergens; William Talman
- Cinematography: Guy Roe
- Edited by: Desmond Marquette
- Music by: Roy Webb; Paul Sawtell
- Production company: RKO Radio Pictures
- Distributed by: RKO Radio Pictures
- Release date: June 7, 1950 (US)
- Running time: 67 minutes
- Country: United States
- Language: English

Armored Car Robbery is a 1950 American film noir directed by Richard Fleischer and starring Charles McGraw, Adele Jergens and William Talman.

The film tells the story of a well-planned robbery of cash from an armored car when it stops at a sports stadium. The theft goes awry and tough Los Angeles cop Jim Cordell pursues the culprits.

== Plot ==
In Los Angeles, criminal mastermind Dave Purvis devises a scheme to rob an armored car on its last pickup of the day at Wrigley Field. He recruits Benny McBride, who brings fellow low-level professional crooks Al Mapes and Ace Foster to complete the gang. Benny needs money to feed his hopeless plan to win back his wife Yvonne LeDoux, a gorgeous blonde strip-tease dancer who is now seeing Purvis.

The robbery at Wrigley Field begins as planned but goes wrong when a passing police patrol car intervenes. Purvis kills one of the police officers and the gang flees. Lieutenant Jim Cordell, the dead cop's partner, resolves to bring the killer to justice and throws himself into the case, treating his rookie replacement partner Danny Ryan disdainfully.

In the hail of gunfire during the robbery, Benny was badly wounded. Having switched to another getaway car, the four luckily pass a roadblock. When McBride demands medical attention and his share of the loot, he is shot dead by Purvis. Purvis insists that he will give Benny's cut to Yvonne, leading Mapes to correctly deduce that they have a romantic relationship. Foster disposes of the second getaway car, containing McBride's body, in the harbor, but the sinking vehicle is spotted by police. Foster is then killed by the police as the three attempt to escape in a motorboat.

Mapes and Purvis flee separately, with Purvis still holding all of the loot. Mapes tries to meet Yvonne at the burlesque theater where she works, seeking a lead on Purvis. The waiting police intercept and arrest him, and he tells them of Purvis's identity.

Ryan investigates undercover disguised as Mapes, whom Yvonne has never met. Purvis alerts her and captures Ryan, whom he shoots as he and Yvonne flee. Ryan manages to inform Cordell that Purvis and Yvonne are intending to leave the country by chartered airplane. Cordell and his team corner the couple at the airport. Purvis is killed by a landing plane as he tries to escape across the runway. The money is recovered, and as Ryan heals from his wound, he is accepted by Cordell as a worthy partner.

== Cast ==
- Charles McGraw as Lieutenant Jim Cordell
- Adele Jergens as Yvonne LeDoux
- William Talman as Dave Purvis
- Douglas Fowley as Benny McBride
- Steve Brodie as Al Mapes
- Don McGuire as Detective Danny Ryan
- James Flavin as Lieutenant Phillips
- Gene Evans as William 'Ace' Foster

== Production ==
The film is based on a story by Charles Pete and Richard Carroll about a $500,000 robbery, which in turn was based on a 1934 robbery at the Rubel Ice Company. Originally titled Gravesend Bay, the story was sold to RKO in March 1949. Robert Ryan was originally intended to play the rookie cop Danny Ryan. The studio retitled the film Code No 3 before settling on the title Armored Car Robbery.

In August 1949, Earl Felton was assigned to write the script. Herman Schlom was named as producer with Richard Fleischer to direct. Charles McGraw was cast in December 1949. The film was filmed on location in Los Angeles over 16 days. Areas of location filming included Wrigley Field and Los Angeles Metropolitan Airport.

== Reception ==
In a contemporary review, Marjory Adams of The Boston Globe called Armored Car Robbery "a better than average cops-and-robbers drama" and wrote: "Almost all the customary cliches have been left out of the script and the result is an interesting, taut and exciting picture. It illustrates how police detectives work out their crime problems and the exactitude with which the criminals plan their thefts."

Critic Jane Corby of the Brooklyn Eagle called the film "an hour and eight minutes of high-powered action" and wrote: "The picture presents cops-and-robbers in the ultramodern manner, and because it is reminiscent of recent headline-making holdups, it has an added thrill for the audience."

Variety magazine's reviewer wrote: "RKO has concocted an okay cops-and-robbers melodrama ...[and] McGraw, Don McGuire and James Flavin, as cops, do very well. Talman and his cohorts put plenty of color into their heavy assignments. Adele Jergens attracts as a stripteaser and Talman's romantic interest".

== Home media ==
Warner Bros. released the film on DVD on July 13, 2010 as part of its Film Noir Classic Collection, Vol. 5.
