= Tim Talman =

American actor

- Born: February 23, 1965 (age 61)
- Occupations: Stage, film, and television actor

Timothy C. "Tim" Talman (born February 23, 1965) is an American stage, film, and television actor. He is the youngest son of the late William Talman, who was known on television as Perry Mason's district attorney, Hamilton Burger. With the rest of his family, he appeared in an anti-smoking ad.

== Career ==
Talman made his Broadway debut in Peter Pan with Cathy Rigby, playing Cecco (Pirate/Indian). He has performed in the Broadway and touring companies of The Who's Tommy as The Lover with Alice Ripley, and Miss Saigon. Talman worked with Pete Townsend, performing in 1st US National Tour of The Who's Tommy. He originated the role as The Lover in The Who's Tommy in its European Premier in Offenbach, Germany. He has also gone on tour with companies of Man of La Mancha and West Side Story. In August 2007, Talman appeared in the Hollywood Bowl's concert presentation of South Pacific. A few months later, he was cast in the Reprise! production of Damn Yankees at the UCLA Freud Playhouse.

Talman was interviewed for "Medical: Remembering the Man Who Always Lost to Perry Mason and then Died of Cancer", an HNN article about his father, and "National Treasure 2: Book of Secrets—History, Chemistry, and Comedy", an article regarding his role in National Treasure 2.

His work in television includes roles on Brooklyn Nine-Nine, Moonlight, CSI: Crime Scene Investigation, and 24. In 2005, he was Dylan in the film My Demon Within. He played FBI Agent Cade in Jon Turteltaub's 2007 movie, National Treasure 2: Book of Secrets. In 2013, he was directed by Clint Eastwood in the film American Sniper starring Bradley Cooper. In 2016, he filmed House of Sticks with Jack McGee.

Talman was an original cast member of the Universal Studios Hollywood productions of Beetlejuice, with former Wicked cast member Eden Espinosa, and Spiderman Rocks! He performed the role of the Deacon in the Waterworld Stunt Show.

Talman originated the role of the Witch's Father/Ozian Official in San Francisco's sit-down production of Wicked, which opened at the Orpheum Theatre on February 6, 2009, and closed on September 5, 2010. He replaced Matthew Stocke in the Los Angeles company of Wicked on February 12, 2008, later closing with the cast and moving to San Francisco to open the sit-down production.

In 2012, Talman joined the Los Angeles Police Department.

Talman has also been seen performing, Run Rudolph Run at the L. Ron Hubbard Winter Wonderland hosted by the Church of Scientology in Los Angeles.
