= Joseph Church =

American musician and author

Joseph Church (born November 25, 1957) is an American music director, composer, pianist, arranger, orchestrator, and author. He is best known for his music direction of the musicals The Who's Tommy and The Lion King on Broadway.

== Biography ==
Church was born in Poughkeepsie, New York, on the Vassar College campus, where his father (also called Joseph Church) taught psychology, and spent three years in Honolulu, Hawaii, as a child. He has lived and worked in New York City for most of his life. He received a B.A. in music from Swarthmore College in 1978 and a Master of Music from the University of Illinois in choral conducting 1980. Church completed his doctorate in music composition in 1996 at New York University's Steinhardt Department of Music and Performing Arts, where he teaches composition, conducting and music direction, and musical theatre performance.

He has one daughter, Susannah Jane Church, born in 1994, by his ex-wife, Pamela Tsalapatas Church. In 2006, Church received public attention after being the victim of a stabbing on the New York University campus, but he made a fast and full recovery.

As a music director for the theatre, Church's first major job was the first national tour of Little Shop of Horrors in 1984. He began work in 1991 on The Who's Tommy as music director and vocal arranger for its original production at La Jolla Playhouse, for which he received the Los Angeles Drama-Logue Award in music direction. He continued as the music supervisor, music director, and conductor for the Broadway production and supervisor for subsequent tours and international productions. He is the original music director and conductor for The Lion King on Broadway. and was music supervisor for New York, London, Tokyo, and Osaka productions of the show. He was music director and conductor for the Grammy-winning cast albums of both shows. Later, he served as the associate conductor for In the Heights from 2008 to 2011, Sister Act (2012), and as the music director, conductor, arranger, and composer of incidental music for Amazing Grace in 2016–17. Other music direction credits include Julie Taymor's Green Bird, Radio City Music Hall's Christmas Spectacular and Randy Newman's Faust.

== Works ==
=== Music ===
Church first served as a theatrical composer for An Evening with Joan Crawford, which premiered Off-Broadway at the Orpheum Theatre in 1981. Other musicals include Pest Control, The Evil of Two Lessers, and Fry Canyon, Pop. 2. His stage adaptation of the 2007 film The Thief was produced at the El Portal Theatre in North Hollywood in 2008.

Church has music directed several of Sheldon Harnick's concert performances. Their first compositional collaboration was an adaptation of Jean de la Fontaine's Les Fables for chorus and orchestra. Another such piece, The Tortoise and the Two Ducks, was premiered by the New York University Symphony in 2017 and received third place in the American Prize for Composition (light classical division). Their relationship continued when Church recently re-orchestrated two of Harnick's musicals, The Rothschilds (music by Jerry Bock) and Rex (music by Richard Rodgers).

Among Church's other concert works are his Three Romances for mixed chorus, Sonata for Two Pianos, Mock Opera (an avant-garde instrumental opera), Three Jazz Etudes for piano, and most recently, What Went Wrong, for string quintet and percussion ensemble. He has also been the composer-in-residence for the Manhattan Repertory Theatre and New York's Riverside Shakespeare Company, and has written incidental music for over thirty plays. Church orchestrated the new musical The 60s Project, which premiered at Goodspeed Opera House, and A Sign of the Times, which began at Goodspeed in 2016 and continued at the Delaware Theatre Company in 2018.

=== Books ===
Church is the author of Music Direction for the Stage: A View from the Podium (Oxford University Press, 2015), the only comprehensive text published on music direction. Music Direction for the Stage has been used in collegiate curricula in the US and has brought greater recognition to the work of musical directors. His second book, Rock in the Musical Theatre: A Guide for Singers, was released October 1, 2019 by Oxford University Press.
