= William Talman (actor) =

American actor (1915–1968)

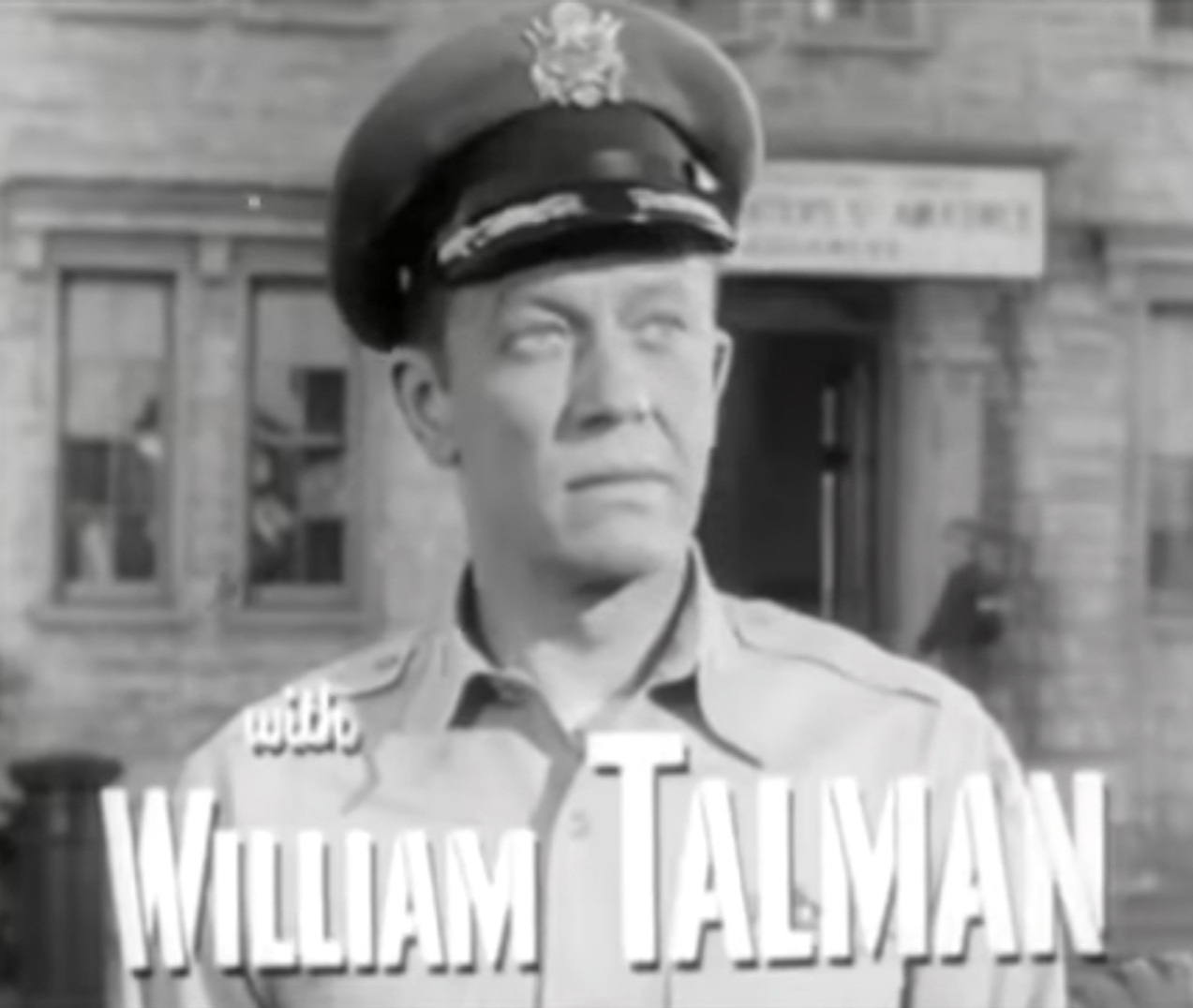
- Talman in the trailer for One Minute to Zero (1952)
- Born: William Whitney Talman Jr. February 4, 1915; Detroit, Michigan, U.S.
- Died: August 30, 1968 (aged 53); Encino, California, U.S.
- Resting place: Forest Lawn Hollywood Hills, Los Angeles, California - Plot: Court of Liberty, Lot 833.
- Other name: Bill Talman
- Education: University of Michigan
- Occupation: Actor
- Years active: 1940–1967
- Spouses: Lynne Carter (m. 1942; div. 1952) Barbara Read (m. 1953; div. 1959) Margaret Flanagan (m. 1963)
- Children: 5 (Note: 1 from Carter, 2 from Read and 2 from Flanagan.)

William Whitney Talman Jr. (February 4, 1915 – August 30, 1968) was an American television and movie actor, best known for playing Los Angeles District Attorney Hamilton Burger in the television series Perry Mason.

== Family and education ==
William Talman was born in Detroit, Michigan, to Ada Barber and William Whitney Talman, a vice president of an electronics company. His maternal grandparents, Catherine Gandy and James Wells Barber, were immigrants from England.

Talman founded the drama club at the Cranbrook Kingswood School in Bloomfield Hills, Michigan. He continued to act at Dartmouth College and the University of Michigan. After college, he worked in summer stock and at an iron foundry, paper mills, boat yards, and as an automobile salesman. Talman served for 30 months in the United States Army in the Pacific Theatre of World War II, beginning his service as a private on February 4, 1942, at Camp Upton in Yaphank, Long Island, New York. He was ultimately commissioned a major during the war.

== Acting career ==
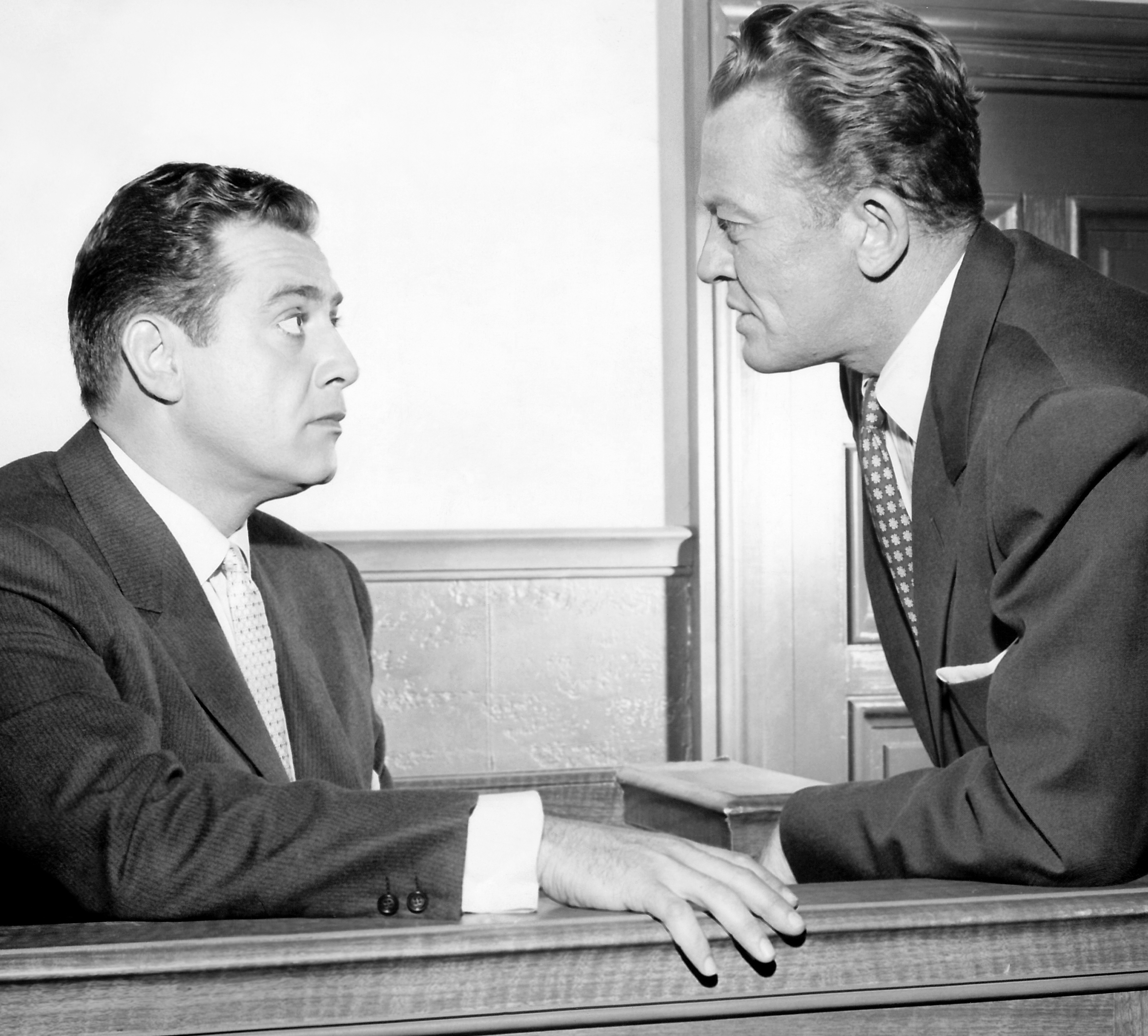
Raymond Burr and William Talman in Perry Mason (1958)

Talman began his acting career on the stage. He was the leading man in the summer stock company at Ivoryton, Connecticut, where he met his first wife, and he played the male lead in Dear Ruth during part of the play's New York run. He appeared on Broadway in Beverly Hills, Spring Again and A Young Man's Fancy, and toured with the road companies of Yokel Boy and Of Mice and Men.

William Talman quickly established himself as a villain in motion pictures. His breakthrough role was in director Richard Fleischer's 1950 film noir thriller Armored Car Robbery, inspired by the Great Brink's Robbery. Talman played the leading role of a career criminal, acknowledged as a genius in gangland circles, who painstakingly masterminded the armored car robbery of the title. In the 1952 film Beware, My Lovely, in which Ida Lupino played a war widow terrorized by a madman in her home, a photograph of Talman was used for the picture of her late, heroic husband.

In 1953, Talman played a sadistic psychopathic killer in a movie directed by Lupino, the film noir The Hitch-Hiker. The New York Times wrote, "William Talman, as the ruthless murderer, makes the most of one of the year's juiciest assignments."

His performance was also noted by Gail Patrick Jackson, executive producer of the CBS-TV series Perry Mason (1957–66). Raymond Burr had initially auditioned for the role of Mason's adversary, Los Angeles district attorney Hamilton Burger, but Jackson encouraged Burr to lose 60 pounds and read for the lead role – which Burr successfully did. Jackson already had an actor in mind for the district attorney: "I'd seen a brilliant little movie, The Hitch-Hiker, and had to have Bill Talman as Burger – and he never disappointed us", Jackson said.

In 1958, a journalist asked Talman how he felt about Burger losing to Mason week after week. Talman said,

Burger doesn't lose. How can a district attorney lose when he fails to convict an innocent person? Unlike a fist or gun fight, in court you can have a winner without having a loser. As a matter of fact, Burger in a good many instances has joined Mason in action against unethical attorneys, lying witnesses, or any one else obstructing justice. Like any real-life district attorney, justice is Burger's main interest.

Talman, as Burger, went on to lose all but three cases in the nine-year series, including a record two separate murder trials in the final episode. He called his record "the longest losing streak in history". Talman had the title role in the 1960 episode "The Case of the Prudent Prosecutor" in which Burger disqualified himself from prosecuting a longtime personal friend, Jefferson Pike, who was accused of murder. At the end of the episode, after Pike was cleared by Mason, Burger said, "You know, I think I won this case."

Aside from his major supporting role in Perry Mason, Talman also guest-starred in various television series, including Wagon Train, Have Gun – Will Travel, Cimarron City and Gunsmoke. After the 1966 cancellation of Perry Mason, Talman appeared on The Wild, Wild West and in a first-season episode of The Invaders, "Quantity: Unknown", which was his last on-screen acting role before his death.

== Arrest, CBS suspension, charges dropped ==
In 1960, Talman was fired from Perry Mason for a short period after Sheriff's deputies, suspicious of marijuana use, raided a party on March 13, 1960, in the West Hollywood apartment of Richard Reibold, an advertising agency executive. The deputies reported finding Talman and seven other defendants variously naked and partly dressed. Among the guests was Mrs. Peggy Louise Flannigan, who would later become William Talman's next wife, after his divorce from Barbara Read.

All were arrested for possession of marijuana (the charge was later dropped) and lewd vagrancy. On June 17, municipal judge Adolph Alexander dismissed the charges of lewd vagrancy against Talman and the others for lack of proof. "I don't approve of their conduct," the judge ruled, "but it is not for you and me to approve but to enforce the statutes." In spite of the dismissal, CBS fired Talman and refused to give a reason. (Note: Hal Ericson writes in the book Encyclopedia of Television Law Shows: Factual and Fictional Series About Judges, Lawyers and the Courtroom, 1948–2008, "Though the charges were later dropped, CBS invoked the morals clause in Talman's contract, suspending him from Perry Mason on the grounds the viewers would reject the presence of a 'tainted' performer.") Talman was later rehired after the series's executive producer, Gail Patrick Jackson, and Talman's friend, Raymond Burr, made a request to CBS; Erle Stanley Gardner, the creator of Perry Mason, spoke out in favor of Talman's return; and a massive campaign of letters from viewers to CBS.

== Personal life ==
Talman was married three times. His first marriage, to actress Lynne Carter, lasted from just before he left for active service in 1942 to September 1952 and produced one daughter, Lynda. His second wife was actress Barbara Read; she had two sons, Damon and Quentin, from her second marriage. Read and Talman were married in 1953 and had one daughter, Barbie, and one son, William Whitney Talman III. The couple divorced on August 23, 1960. Talman's third wife was Margaret Louise Larkin Flannigan, whom he married in 1963; she had a son, Steve, and daughter, Debbie, from a previous marriage. The couple had two children: a son, Timothy, and a daughter, Susan. Margaret Talman outlived William Talman by almost 34 years, dying also of lung cancer related to smoking, in January 2002, at age 73.

== Antismoking advocacy and death ==
Talman is also known for being the first actor in Hollywood to film an antismoking public service announcement for the American Cancer Society. A lifelong heavy smoker, he was diagnosed with lung cancer, and knew he was dying when he filmed the commercial. The short film began with the words: "Before I die, I want to do what I can to leave a world free of cancer for my six children." Talman requested that the commercial not be aired until after his death. He made another public service announcement, which opened with his voice-over and a picture of his home, followed by filmed shots of his wife and kids, then a still of himself "with a friend of mine you might recognize," Raymond Burr, from the Perry Mason TV series. He then said,

You know, I didn't really mind losing those courtroom battles, but I'm in a battle now I don't want to lose at all. Because if I lose it, it means losing my wife and those kids you just met. I've got lung cancer... So take some advice about smoking and losing from someone who's been doing both for years... If you don't smoke, don't start. If you do smoke, quit!.... Don't be a loser.

Four weeks after filming the second public service announcement, on August 30, 1968, at the age of 53, Talman died of lung cancer (which had metastasized to his liver, bones and brain). He was buried at Forest Lawn Memorial Park (Hollywood Hills) in Los Angeles.

== Theatre credits ==
Date	Title	Role	Notes
November 7–30, 1940	Beverly Hills	Ted Farlow	Fulton Theatre, New York City; Directed by Otto Preminger
November 10, 1941 – June 6, 1942	Spring Again	Arnold Greaves	Henry Miller's Theatre and Playhouse Theatre, New York City; Directed by Guthrie McClintic
April 29, 1947 – February 14, 1948	A Young Man's Fancy	Harold Greenley	Plymouth Theatre and Cort Theatre, New York City

== Filmography ==
Year	Title	Role	Notes
1949	Red, Hot and Blue	Bunny Harris	
1949	The Woman on Pier 13	Bailey	
1950	The Kid from Texas	Minniger	
1950	Armored Car Robbery	Dave Purvis	
1951	The Racket	Bob Johnson	
1952	One Minute to Zero	Col. John Parker	
1953	The Hitch-Hiker	Emmett Myers	
1953	City That Never Sleeps	Hayes Stewart	
1954	Lux Video Theatre	Brad Ringer	"Pick of the Litter"
1955	Crashout	Luther "Swanee" Remsen	
1955	Smoke Signal	Captain Harper	
1955	Four Star Playhouse	Eddie	'"Eddie's Place"
1955	Big House, U.S.A.	Machinegun Mason	
1955	Cavalcade of America	Wes Hardin	"The Texas Ranger"
1955	Two-Gun Lady	Marshal Dan Corbin	
1955	TV Reader's Digest		"Old Master Detective"
1955	Science Fiction Theatre	Norman Conway	"The Water Maker"
1955	The Ford Television Theatre	Jack	"South of Selangor"
1956	Screen Directors Playhouse	Barney	"Number Five Checked Out"
1956	Uranium Boom	Grady Mathews	
1956	The Man Is Armed	Hackett	
1956	Telephone Time	Lew Reese	"Scio, Ohio"
1956	Telephone Time		"The Sergeant Boyd Story"
1956	I've Lived Before		Writer
1956	Climax!		"The Louella Parsons Story"
1956	Climax!	Joe MacKenzie	"Sit Down with Death"
1956	Climax!	Stan	"Dark Wall"
1957	Joe Dakota		Writer
1957	The Persuader	Mark Bonham / Matt Bonham	
1957	Hell on Devil's Island	Bayard	
1957	Trackdown	Blaine Sand	"Like Father"
1957– 1966	Perry Mason	Hamilton Burger	212 episodes
1958	Climax!	Detective	"Scream in Silence"
1958	Tombstone Territory	Logan Beatty	"The Return of the Outlaw"
1958	Wagon Train	Walt Archer	"The Sarah Drummond Story"
1958	Alcoa Theatre	Lt. Herman Brule	"Disappearance"
1958	Cimarron City	Mr. Conway	"To Become a Man"
1960	Have Gun – Will Travel	George Jondill	"The Shooting of Jessie May"
1961	Have Gun – Will Travel	Sheriff	"Long Way Home"
1963	Stump the Stars	Himself	July 8, 1963
1963	Gunsmoke	Race Fallon	"Legends Don't Sleep"
1966	The Wild Wild West	Sheriff	"The Night of the Man-Eating House"
1967	The Virginian		Writer, "A Welcoming Town"
1967	The Invaders	Colonel Frank Griffith	"Quantity: Unknown"
1967	The Ballad of Josie	District Attorney Charlie Lord	(final film role)
