= Non-replica production =

Theatre concept

A non-replica production is a theatrical production of a pre-existing show, often featuring new sets, costumes, choreography, or staging. These productions are approved by the original creators of the play or musical, but are produced by a new creative team and look different from the original (often Broadway or West End) production. The choice to license a non-replica production instead of a replica is more common in less developed international theatrical markets and in regions speaking a different language than the original production.

== Notable examples ==
Show	Location	Language	Year	Ref
Phantom of the Opera	Budapest	Hungarian	2003	
Frozen	Oslo, Norway	Norwegian	2023	
SIX	Warsaw, Poland	Polish	2023	
Wicked	São Paulo, Brazil	Portuguese	2025	
Frozen	Minnesota, United States	English	2025	
Wicked	Bühne Baden, Austria	German	2025	
High School Musical	Manchester, England	English	2025	
Frozen	Budapest, Hungary	Hungarian	2025	
