= Sonic Underground =

French-American animated television series

- French: Sonic le Rebelle
- Created by: Jean Cheville; Jean Chalopin; Andy Heyward; Robby London
- Based on: Sonic the Hedgehog by: Yuji Naka; Naoto Ohshima; Hirokazu Yasuhara
- Directed by: Marc Boreal; François Hemmen; Daniel Sarriet; Tom Smith (US)
- Voices of: Jaleel White; Sam Vincent; Stevie Vallance; Tyley Ross; Garry Chalk; Brian Drummond; Maurice LaMarche; Peter Wilds; Gail Webster
- Theme music composer: Robby London; Mike Piccirillo
- Opening theme: "Sonic Underground"
- Composers: Jean-Michel Guirao; Mike Piccirillo
- Countries of origin: France; United States
- Original language: English
- No. of seasons: 1
- No. of episodes: 40

Production
- Executive producers: Andy Heyward; Michael Maliani; Robby London
- Producer: Janice Sonski
- Running time: 22 minutes
- Production companies: Les Studios Tex S.A.R.L. DIC Productions, L.P. Sega of America

Original release
- Network: TF1 (France); Syndication (BKN Kids II) (U.S.)
- Release: 6 January – 23 May 1999

Related
- Adventures of Sonic the Hedgehog; Sonic the Hedgehog; Sonic X Sonic Boom; Sonic Prime

Sonic Underground (French: Sonic le Rebelle) is an American-French animated musical television series co-produced by DIC Productions, L.P., Les Studios Tex S.A.R.L., Sega of America and TF1. It is the third Sonic the Hedgehog animated series, and the last to be produced by DIC, after Adventures of Sonic the Hedgehog and Sonic the Hedgehog SaTaM. It follows a main plot separate from all other Sonic the Hedgehog media, where Sonic is a prince and has two siblings, Sonia and Manic, that are collectively part of a royal family who were forced to separate from their mother, Queen Aleena, upon Doctor Robotnik's takeover of Mobius due to a prophecy told by the Oracle of Delphius. Along the way, they encounter other resistance groups against Robotnik and powerful artifacts that could wreak havoc on the world, all the while searching for their long-lost mother.

The series first aired in France from January to May 1999 on TF1, and then premiered in the United Kingdom in May 1999 on ITV on the GMTV strand and finally in the United States in the syndicated children's block BKN Kids II from August to October 1999. It also aired on the Sci-Fi Channel on weekday mornings starting October 1999, lasting until October 2000. The show ran only for one season, consisting of forty episodes.

== Plot ==
The show takes place in a canon and continuity separate from any other Sonic the Hedgehog media. Queen Aleena, the ruler of Mobius, is overthrown by Dr. Robotnik, who seizes control of the planet with his army of Swat-bots and forces Queen Aleena into hiding. To preserve the dynasty, Queen Aleena separates her three children: Sonic, Sonia, and Manic after the Oracle of Delphius tells her of a prophecy proclaiming she would one day reunite with her children to form the "Council of Four" and overthrow Robotnik. Meanwhile, Dr. Robotnik establishes an autocratic government by appointing bounty hunters Sleet and Dingo to do his dirty work, legally turning anyone who stands against him into robots devoid of free will, and forcing the nobles into paying large amounts of money to him as tribute.

When Sonic, Sonia, and Manic grow up, the Oracle of Delphius reveals the prophecy to them. After that, Sonic, Sonia, and Manic go on a quest searching for Queen Aleena throughout Mobius. Dr. Robotnik, with the assistance from Sleet, Dingo and the Swat-bots, tries constantly to capture the royal hedgehogs and prevent the prophecy from being fulfilled.

The Oracle of Delphius assigns the three siblings powerful medallions that can change into musical instruments, and can also be used as weapons: Sonic's medallion is an electric guitar; Sonia's medallion is a keyboard that functions as a smoke machine; and Manic's medallion is a drumset that can be used as an "earth controller" with cymbals that can deflect laserfire. All of the medallions can be used as laser guns. The three use the medallions not only to fight Robotnik's forces, but also as instruments for their underground rock band, "Sonic Underground".

== Characters ==
=== Main ===
Sonia, Sonic, and Manic (from left to right)

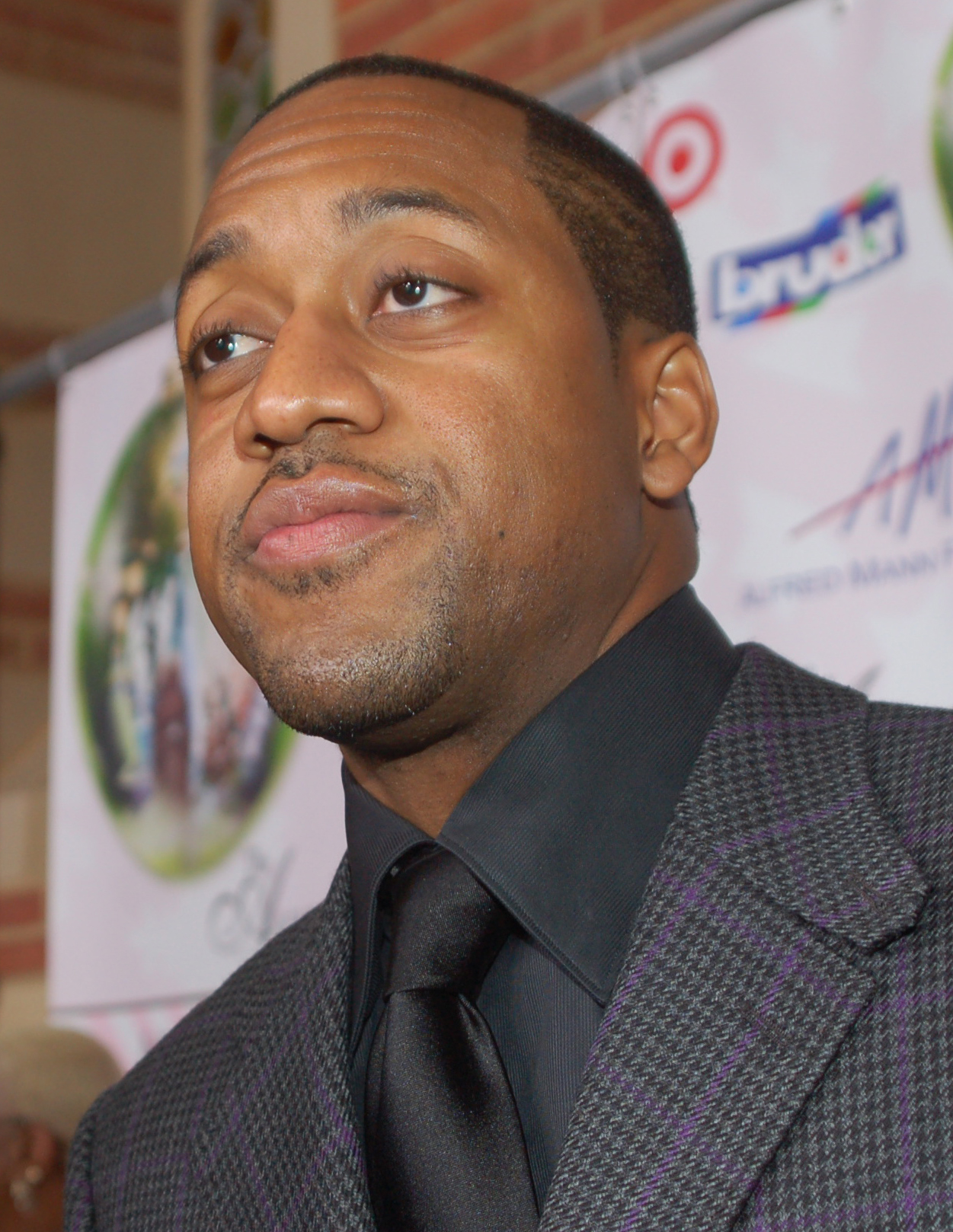
Jaleel White, in addition to reprising his role as Sonic from DiC's previous shows, also provided the voice for the character's siblings Manic and Sonia.

- Sonic (speaking voice by Jaleel White and singing voice provided by Sam Vincent) is the eldest sibling and lead singer of many songs performed by the Sonic Underground. His medallion turns into a guitar, which can fire laser blasts. As fast as the speed of sound, Sonic can easily outrun danger. He is a big fan of chili dogs, causing him to be a bit overweight. He also is terrified of water as he cannot swim. Sonic wears anti-gravity sneakers that allow him to hover over the ground while running.
- Sonia (speaking voice by Jaleel White and singing voice provided by Stevie Vallance) is the only female hedgehog member of the Sonic Underground and the sister of Sonic and Manic. Unlike her brothers, she was raised by an aristocratic foster family, giving her an upper-class mentality. She hates getting dirty, is skilled at gymnastics and karate, and possesses superhuman strength, a photographic memory, and the ability to spin in a cyclonic manner. Her medallion turns into a keyboard, which can fire laser blasts from one end, or create a pink mist when the keys are played. Sonia has a pink motorcycle which can travel as fast as Sonic's running and Manic's hover board. She also is the one that does research on Robotnik's plans and provides the technological innovation for the Sonic Underground. Of the siblings, Sonia is the only one to be seen involved in any romance, displaying feelings for her childhood friend Bartleby, despite his snobbishness, as well as other men encountered in her travels. Among these is Knuckles, whom she develops an attraction to during the series' Flying Fortress saga.
- Manic (speaking voice by Jaleel White and singing voice provided by Tyley Ross) is the youngest sibling. He is a calculating and sarcastic hedgehog that was raised by thieves, and is a master of their trade. When Manic met his siblings, they disapproved of his thieving tendencies, but his skills as a lock-pick were greatly appreciated. Manic possesses neither Sonic's speed nor Sonia's spin-attack, thus making him the only member of the Sonic Underground who relies entirely on his medallion for superpowers of his own. Despite his lack of superpowers, his thieving skills proves himself extremely useful to the group from time to time. Manic is the drummer of the Sonic Underground. His medallion turns into drums, which can cause earthquakes; the Oracle of Delphius claims that his drums are the most powerful instruments of the three. He also has a hover board that is as fast as Sonic's running and Sonia's motorcycle. His medallion's string is blue.
- Dr. Robotnik (voiced by Garry Chalk) is the evil human dictator of Mobius, renamed Robotropolis under his rule, having conquered it with his army of Swatbots. He captures and roboticizes anyone who opposes him, transforming them into robotic servants.
  - Sleet (voiced by Maurice LaMarche) is a wolf and one of Robotnik's canine bounty hunters. This cunning wolf leads the bumbling Dingo about on missions to capture the hedgehogs. Sleet has a morphing device that can transform Dingo into anything he wishes. He is constantly being crushed by Dingo and is usually the one who suffers the most from their combined failures.
  - Dingo (also voiced by Maurice LaMarche) is a dingo who is one of Robotnik's canine bounty hunters and Sleet's partner. Dingo is a huge, muscle-bound blonde dingo and is also very ignorant. He is partially roboticized in his hands and his left leg from the knee down, which is never explained. He has a relentless crush on Sonia, but remains fiercely loyal to Sleet.
  - Swatbots (also voiced by Maurice LaMarche) are the robotic foot soldiers of Dr. Robotnik.

=== Recurring ===
- Queen Aleena Hedgehog (voiced by Gail Webster) is the mother of the Sonic Underground group and former ruler of Mobius before Robotnik's takeover. She had to give them up in order for the prophecy to become true. She spends the series on the run from her own children, until the time is right to reveal herself. Her character has many allies, including the Oracle of Delphius and Knuckles. She also does a bit of narrating in the start of every episode.
- Knuckles (voiced by Brian Drummond) is a red echidna who is the guardian of one of the Chaos Emeralds and Angel Island, and an acquaintance of Queen Aleena's. He is very protective of his island home, and has set many traps about the island. He has a pet lizard called Chomps, and like his game incarnation is shown to be somewhat gullible. His great-grandfather Athair warns him that he must stay on the island in order to play his part in the freedom of Mobius. He turned against the Hedgehogs twice - first being tricked into thinking they were thieves and later thinking that it was the only way to save their planet - but came around and worked with them against the threat of Robotnik and his henchmen. During the Flying Fortress arc, he showed signs of a growing affection for Sonia, including a particular guilt over the prospect of betraying her.
- The Freedom Fighters are allies of Sonic, Sonia, and Manic. They assist in fighting the forces of Dr. Robotnik.
  - Oracle of Delphius (voiced by Maurice LaMarche) is an odd, wart-covered creature in a cloak that resembles a scaly anteater/crocodile hybrid. The Oracle prophesied that when Robotnik invaded Mobius, Aleena and her children would form the Council of Four to overthrow Robotnik and free Mobius. The Oracle lives in a cave somewhere in a cold region of Mobius, and is quite good at making chili dogs. He is named after the Oracle at Delphi.
  - Sir Bartleby Montclair (voiced by Peter Wilds) is a posh, cowardly upper-class English-accented mink who is one of Robotropolis' richest aristocrats. Bartleby is Sonia's ex-fiancé. He dislikes Dr. Robotnik and is often forced to fund Robotnik's schemes – although in secret he still supports Queen Aleena.
  - Cyrus (voiced by Ian James Corlett) is a lion and a technician for the Freedom Fighters. He is an old friend of Sonic. In his first appearance he was working as a spy for Robotnik, but quit upon discovering that the Freedom Fighters' Sanctuary was a hideout for their children. Cyrus's father was roboticized.
  - Trevor (voiced by Matt Hill) is a mouse who is a friend of the royal siblings and Cyrus. He dresses like a hippie. Trevor is an ace pilot and helps build and fix mechanical equipment.
  - Renée is a fox and computer expert who leads a branch of the Freedom Fighters in the resort town of Anays.
- Athair (voiced by Maurice LaMarche impersonating Sean Connery) is the great-grandfather of Knuckles. While he advises Knuckles not to leave Angel Island, he does provide advice to his great-grandson.

== Episodes ==
No.	English title French title	Episode song	Written by	Original release date	U.S. air date	Prod. code
1	"Wedding Bell Blues" "L'union fait la farce"	When Tomorrow Comes	Ben Hurst and Pat Allee	6 January 1999	4 October 1999	401
Dr. Robotnik plots to become the king of Mobius. His first attempt was to marry Queen Aleena, which did not work due to the limited amount of money Robotnik had. His second attempt was to adopt Queen Aleena's daughter Sonia. In order to do this, he had Sleet and Dingo capture all of the hedgehogs and give Sonia to Robotnik so he could adopt her. Robotnik was almost successful until Queen Aleena demanded Robotnik not to adopt her.
2	"To Catch a Queen" "Échec à la reine"	Have You Got the 411?	Doug Booth	10 January 1999	31 August 1999	402
Argus, the former captain of the Queen's guard, arranges a secret meeting with her but he is soon intercepted by Robotnik's bounty hunters, Sleet and Dingo, who have every intention of feeding the soldier to the Roboticizer. Then Sonic, Sonia, and Manic attempt to rescue him.
3	"Mobodoon" "Mobourg-Latour"	I've Found My Home	Peter Hunziker	13 January 1999	1 September 1999	403
While evading Sleet and Dingo, the hedgehogs find themselves in a town completely untainted by Robotnik where Sonic and his siblings find the people to be nice, and the food is free. After using the Power Stone, the siblings discover that this is where they were born. Manic starts to become attached to the place and reports that this is where he wants to stay.
4	"The Price of Freedom" "Course contre la montre"	Money Can't Buy	Martha Moran	17 January 1999	2 September 1999	404
Sonia, after getting dirty on one of her missions, drives to East Mobius; Sonic and Manic follow her after receiving news that Queen Aleena had been spotted there. There, Sonia is reunited with her best friend, Mindy LaTour, and her father. Mindy gives Sonia a watch. Unknown to the girls though, the timepiece is a tracking device designed by Robotnik. Sonia finds out, and soon, Mindy's estate is swarming with similar wristwatch-style robots, all being programmed to capture the hedgehogs.
5	"Underground Masquerade" "Bal du duc"	Let the Good Times Roll	Rick Merwin	20 January 1999	3 September 1999	405
Sonic and Sonia become concerned after Manic reportedly begins to "backslide to his old ways" when he discovers a band of thieves led by Max. Sleet and Dingo are plotting to avoid giving the taxes they are collecting to Robotnik. They choose Manic to frame for a theft.
6	"Tangled Webs" "Holodrame"	Teach the Children, Light the Way	Ben Hurst and Pat Allee	24 January 1999	6 September 1999	406
Sonic meets up with his friend Cyrus. While Sonic believes that Cyrus has joined the Freedom Fighters, he is actually working for Dr. Robotnik. When he finds out that the Freedom Fighters' "sanctuary" is for children, he destroys Robotnik's communicator. Sonic, Sonia and Manic try to get him away from Robotnik.
7	"The Deepest Fear" "Sans peur et sans romoches"	Face Your Fear	Michael Edens and Mark Edens	27 January 1999	7 September 1999	408
On a trip to Port Mobius Sonic, Manic and Sonia are told that ships are sinking due to the Mobian sea-beast Moby Deep. The hedgehogs also meet Captain Squeege who informs them of a scam in which the townspeople must rely on Robotnik for protection from the sea monster. In reality it is Robotnik who is sinking the ships. Sonic is urged to overcome his fear of water and the monster to find the truth and end the fears of the seaside town.
8	"Who Do You Think You Are" "Parfums d'Orient"	We Need to Be Free	Ben Hurst and Pat Allee	31 January 1999	8 September 1999	407
The Sonic Underground arrive in Tashistan in search of the Queen's Journal. Sonia loses her memory and meets Raphi, one of the town's resistance.
9	"The Last Resort" "Comment résister ?"	Listen to Your Heart	Michael Edens	3 February 1999	9 September 1999	409
While escaping from Sleet and Dingo, Sonic, Sonia, and Manic come across Lake Valley Resort. Lake Valley Resort is led by Stripes, who believes that making deals with Robotnik is safer than fighting Robotnik. When Robotnik asks if there are any new people staying at Lake Valley Resort, he reveals that Sonic and Manic are there, leaving out Sonia.
10	"Come Out Wherever You Are" "Bal explosif"	Society Girl	Ben Hurst and Pat Allee	7 February 1999	10 September 1999	410
Bartleby, with the aid of Robotnik, invites Sonia to the Debutante Ball. Meanwhile, Robotnik comes out with the Predator, an aircraft that will capture and robotisize all members of the resistance. When the resistance hijacks the craft, Sonia is chosen to lead the captured members of the resistance to safety.
11	"Winner Fakes All" "Course d'obstacles"	Built for Speed	Mark Edens	10 February 1999	13 September 1999	411
Robotnik has created a super-fast robot and he's organized a race for the top athletes of Mobius and the robot.
12	"A Hedgehog's Home Is Her Castle" "La vie de château"	Let's Do It to It	Len Janson	14 February 1999	14 September 1999	412
Sonia inherits a spooky and dilapidated castle and she enjoys the idea of making it the Underground headquarters. They also choose to stay there overnight.
13	"Artifact" "Objet de voleur"	You Can't Own Everything	Michael Edens	17 February 1999	15 September 1999	413
In order to raise money for his own cause, Robotnik auctions off artifacts from the lost city of Mobupinchu. But these artifacts are actually bombs, and they are about to go off.
14	"Bug!" "Robestioles"	Never Give Up	Len Janson	21 February 1999	16 September 1999	414
The Sonic Underground finds a village that has been destroyed by its Freedom Fighter occupants. The Sonic Underground find that it seems to have something to do with Robotnik's flybots which are all over the desert, as Manic finds out when one of them injects him with a mind-control toxin, making him a slave to Dr. Robotnik.
15	"Sonic Tonic" "Tonisonic"	The Fastest Thing Alive	Mark Edens	24 February 1999	17 September 1999	415
Using the essence of a rare plant, Robotnik manages to create a potion that could grant Sleet and Dingo the ability to run at the speed of Sonic, but it turns out to have troublesome side-effects just after Sonia and Manic take the serum themselves.
16	"Friend or Foe?" "L'ile d'emeraude"	Not Always What They Seem	Kevin Donahue	28 February 1999	20 September 1999	416
The band visit the Floating Island in search of their mother. There they meet Knuckles the Echidna, the island's guardian, who has been falsely told by Sleet and Dingo that the Sonic Underground is after the Chaos Emerald. Knuckles jumps to conclusions and while Knuckles and Sonic battle each other, Sleet and Dingo seek to steal the Emerald.
17	"Head Games" "Reserve surnaturelle"	Take a Chance	Michael Edens	3 March 1999	21 September 1999	417
Queen Aleena tells Sonic, Sonia, and Manic that they are needed in Speedster Island, where they worship stone heads of Mobian hedgehogs. Sonic, Sonia and Manic discover that Sleet and Dingo are scaring the fish away so people who live on Speedster Island move out. Meanwhile, Bartleby wants to turn Speedster Island into a modern resort for wealthy people, with Sleet and Dingo pretending to help. When Sonic, Sonia, and Manic arrive on Speedster Island, Sleet and Dingo capture the hedgehogs, while breaking the promises they made to Bartleby and the people who live on Speedster Island.
18	"When in Rome..." "Vouloir c'est pouvoir"	Where There's a Will, There's a Way	Len Janson	7 March 1999	22 September 1999	418
As a test of the hedgehogs' intellect and wit, the Oracle strips them of their powers and sends them into an alternate, Roman-themed reality where a Sleet-look-alike presides as Emperor.
19	"The Jewel in the Crown" "Mission diademe"	The Cosmic Dance	Mark Edens	10 March 1999	23 September 1999	419
Queen Aleena's Royal Jewel can reportedly trace the location of Queen Aleena. Having apparently found the jewel Sonic, Sonia and Manic think they may have found their mother at last. It is actually a trap to capture Robotnik they've just fallen into.
20	"Three Hedgehogs and a Baby" "BB AJT"	Being a Kid Is Cool	Len Janson	14 March 1999	24 September 1999	420
While in Mobotropolis, Sonic, Sonia and Manic find an abandoned baby hedgehog. While Sonic and Sonia search for its parents, Manic is left to look after it and utilizes his maternal instincts. The baby is actually a robot and Robotnik almost uncovers the Freedom Fighters' sanctuary.
21	"Dunes Day" "Nomade's Land"	True Blue Friend	Mark Edens	17 March 1999	27 September 1999	421
The Sonic Underground come across a nomadic tribe whilst journeying through the desert. Manic claims to not trust the tribe's leader "Ifyoucan". He sets off to find out the truth and uncovers a shocking secret.
22	"Mummy Dearest" "Le parchemin"	Mummy Wrap	Ben Hurst and Pat Allee	21 March 1999	28 September 1999	422
The Sonic Underground journey through the treacherous Mobian desert as they try to locate a hidden temple filled with prophecies of Robotnik's defeat.
23	"Hedgehog in the Iron Mask" "Mascarade"	Part of the Problem	Bob Forward	24 March 1999	29 September 1999	423
The Sonic Underground rescue a prisoner from one of Robotnik's towers – a hedgehog wearing a mask. The prisoner claims he is the hedgehogs' uncle and twin brother of Queen Aleena. It is a sinister plot by Robotnik to split the Sonic Underground up.
24	"Six Is a Crowd" "Monde parallele"	I Can Do That for You	Len Janson	28 March 1999	30 September 1999	424
The hedgehogs visit the Oracle again. He sends them to an alternate dimension where they are tyrannical rulers of Mobius and Robotnik is the leader of the Freedom Fighters. They must defeat their corrupted selves and restore peace to Mobotropolis.
25	"Flying Fortress" "La forteresse volante"	No One Is an Island	Mark Edens	31 March 1999	1 October 1999	425
Robotnik creates a new flying fortress to lay waste to the planet. When the Sonic Underground suspect that a Chaos Emerald is keeping the fortress aloft, they head to the Floating Island to enlist the help of Knuckles. Sleet and Dingo steal the Emerald before the group can reach it, causing the fortress to fall into the sea.
26	"Beginnings" "On reprend au début"	Someday	Ben Hurst and Pat Allee	4 April 1999	30 August 1999	426
Queen Aleena Hedgehog tells the story of how Dr. Robotnik took over planet Mobius and how she had to give up her three children Sonic, Sonia, and Manic to fulfill a prophecy that one day the siblings will be able to rise against Robotnik's rule and restore peace to the planet.
27	"No Hedgehog Is an Island" "Dur comme la pierre"	Learn to Overcome	Mark Edens	7 April 1999	5 October 1999	427
After taking off with the Chaos Emerald, Dingo accidentally breaks it, unleashing the chaos energy inside. The Sonic Underground and Knuckles set off to talk to Knuckles' great-grandfather Athair for advice on handling the situation. Athair advises them to make an alliance with Robotnik.
28	"Getting to Know You" "S'entrainer a s'entraider"	Working Together in Harmony	Ben Hurst and Pat Allee	11 April 1999	6 October 1999	428
The newly reunited Hedgehog siblings must learn to work as a team if they are to do battle with Robotnik.
29	"New Echidna in Town" "Dur, Dur-Dur"	The Mobius Stomp	Mark Edens	14 April 1999	7 October 1999	429
Knuckles bargains with Robotnik in order to recover and repair the Chaos Emerald before Mobius is destroyed, but to acquire the villain's help, the echidna must betray the hedgehogs. After rescuing his friends from the roboticizer, Knuckles and the Sonic Underground must now combat Dingo transformed by the chaos energy into a monster.
30	"Harmony or Something" "Unis sont les hérissons"	We're All in This Together	Ben Hurst and Pat Allee	18 April 1999	8 October 1999	430
Sonic, Sonia and Manic go on a mission to rescue the Oracle from Robotnik.
31	"Country Crisis" "Soscission"	How You Play the Game	Laren Bright	21 April 1999	11 October 1999	431
The Sonic Underground are on a mission to stop a group of hillbillies from feuding so they can stop Robotnik's building project from flooding the countryside.
32	"Haircraft in Space" "Minutes de coiffeur"	Don't Be a Backstabber	Tracy Berna	25 April 1999	12 October 1999	432
A salon robot is hypnotizing people that go to her salon into revealing deep secrets. When Sonia goes there, she reveals the location of their new base.
33	"Healer" "Le charlatan"	We're the Sonic Underground	Ben Hurst and Pat Allee	28 April 1999	13 October 1999	433
A Mobian named Titus creates a machine that can de-robotisize robots called the De-Roboticizer.
34	"Sonia's Choice" "Le choix de Sonia"	Never Easy	Ben Hurst and Pat Allee	2 May 1999	14 October 1999	434
Robotnik is about to auction four royal goblets in Anèz. When the hedgehogs take the goblets back, Sonic and Manic are captured. At both ends of the city are Roboticizers with one of Sonia's brothers inside.
35	"The Big Melt" "20000 lieues sous les glaces"	Fun in the Sun	Len Janson	5 May 1999	15 October 1999	435
What started as a vacation for Sonic, Sonia and Manic gets ruined by Dr. Robotnik when he comes up with a plan – to melt the polar ice caps. Sonia gets split up from the group and mistaken for Queen Sauna by a group of penguins who are having troubles of their own.
36	"Sleepers" "Agent inhibeur"	Have It All Again	Ben Hurst and Pat Allee	9 May 1999	18 October 1999	436
Robotnik invents a new dart that induces sleep and sends them after the resistance. The hedgehogs attempt to stop them from the source. Manic is hit by the sleeper darts. After destroying the sleepers, they attempt to destroy the fuel source in the Bad Lands' Mine.
37	"Bartleby the Prisoner" "Mauvaises mines"	Justice Calling	Elenor Burian-Mohr and Terence Taylor	12 May 1999	19 October 1999	437
Bartleby is placed under arrest for helping out the resistance.
38	"The ART of Destruction" "La musique adoucit les monstres"	The Sound of Freedom	Laren Bright	16 May 1999	20 October 1999	438
The Sonic Underground come across ARTT (Artificial Robot Thought Technology), Robotnik's new robot that can think and learn for itself. ARTT soon learns the power of friendship and switches to the Resistance. This gives Sleet the opportunity to finish off ARTT and the hedgehogs before time runs out.
39	"The Pendant" "Affaire pendante"	Lady Liberty	Ben Hurst and Pat Allee	19 May 1999	21 October 1999	439
While combating Sleet and Dingo in the newly discovered Emerald Peninsula, Sonia finds a magic pendant that threatens to turn her invisible. Sonic and Manic race against time to find the cure to this seemingly irreversible spell before Sonia disappears forever.
40	"Virtual Danger" "La realité du virtuel"	Don't Let Your Guard Down	Ben Hurst and Pat Allee	23 May 1999	22 October 1999	440
Sonic and Manic get addicted to a new video game that is hindering Cyrus' plan to infiltrate Robotnik's base. Sonic and Manic soon find out Robotnik is behind everything and is ready to eliminate them.

== Cast ==
- Jaleel White – Sonic, Sonia, Manic, Aman-Rapi
- Garry Chalk – Dr. Robotnik
- Brian Drummond – Knuckles
- Maurice LaMarche – Sleet, Dingo, Swatbots, Oracle of Delphius, Athair, Chuck, Farrell
- Tyley Ross – Manic (singing voice)
- Stevie Vallance – Sonia (singing voice)
- Sam Vincent – Sonic (singing voice)
- Gail Webster – Queen Aleena Hedgehog
- Peter Wilds – Sir Bartleby Montclair

=== Additional voices ===
- Kathleen Barr – DooBot
- Ian James Corlett – Cyrus
- Merilyn Gann – Mayor Whinnyham
- Phil Hayes – Gondor
- Matt Hill – Max
- Adrian Hughes – Argus
- Terry Klassen – Bat
- Blu Mankuma – Fodder
- Cusse Mankuma – Mantu
- Tabitha St. Germain – Lydia
- Lee Tockar – Trevor

== Crew ==
- Michel Trouillet – voice director

== History ==
=== Development ===
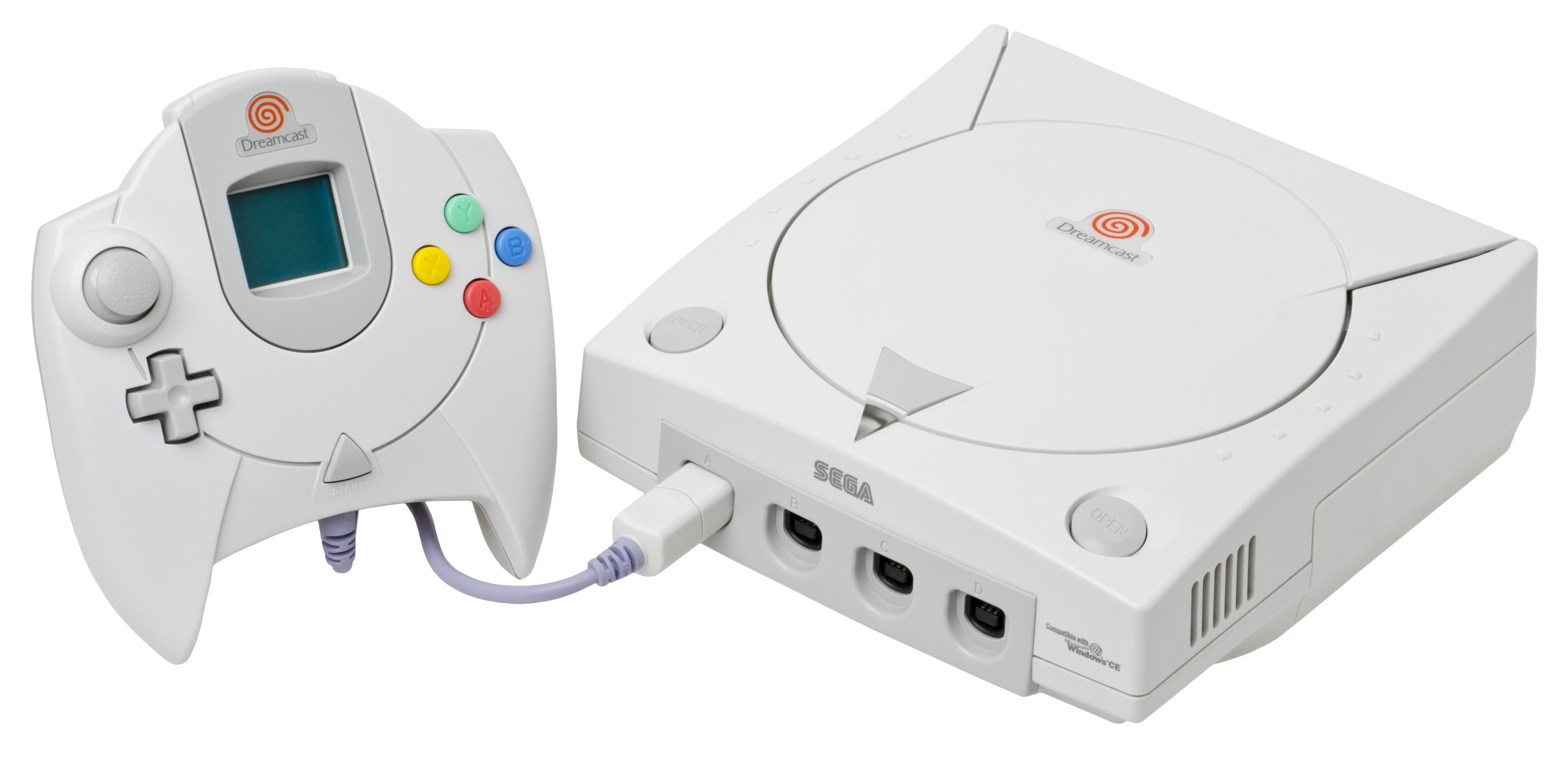
Sonic Underground was originally produced to help gain interest in the Dreamcast.

It is often claimed that the newly Sega of America CEO Shoichiro Irimajiri contacted DIC CEO Andy Heyward to make a new Sonic cartoon, which would help gain interest in buying their new console, the Dreamcast. Sonic Underground started production in early 1997, around the same time the development of both the Dreamcast and Sonic Adventure had started. The show bible was written as early as March 1997. The show was publicly announced as early as December 1997.

When the show was in development, two episodes per week were produced, and the writers felt that they were not given enough time to "tie everything together" in the plot, being limited to a three-part "Origins" saga for coherency. DIC used cattle calls to generate episode plots. Periodically, about twenty unaffiliated writers were brought into the studios to learn about the established characters and brainstorm possible plots for episodes, after which about one or two would be selected. According to Mike Piccirillo, when he was writing songs for the show, there were no storyboards done yet, so he could only work off of the scripts, which often said what moral or lesson the song should be about in each episode. The show's animation was outsourced to the Taiwanese animation studio Hong Ying Animation with the storyboards and main title animation done in Madrid, Spain by Milimetros, S.A. (also responsible for the animation in the Saturday morning Sonic the Hedgehog cartoon and some of the storyboards in Adventures of Sonic the Hedgehog), pre-production services provided by Le Studio Ellipse, layout services by Arles Animation and video and audio post-production services by Les Studios de Saint-Ouen. According to Robby London, Sega of Japan had an active role in the approval process for Sonic Underground, going so far as to force DiC to reanimate the characters with five fingers instead of the usual four due to the Japanese association of four fingers with the yakuza.

While it was once believed that 65 episodes were made of which only 40 aired, Ben Hurst, a main writer from Sonic the Hedgehog (dubbed SatAM by fans), who was also involved in Sonic Underground's production, stated in a chat at the Sonic Amateur Games Expo 2008 that only 40 were planned to be produced from the beginning.

=== Airing and broadcast ===
==== France ====
Sonic Underground first premiered in France on 6 January 1999 and aired on TF1 on the TF! Jeunesse block on Wednesdays and Sundays.

==== United Kingdom ====
The show made its English premiere in the United Kingdom on 2 May 1999, airing on ITV's GMTV strand, on the Disney-produced block Diggit, which was programmed by the show's distributor Buena Vista International Television and had also aired other programmes produced by DIC Entertainment at the time. ITV aired the first 18 episodes of the series on Sunday mornings before the series was removed from the Diggit schedule.

In 2005, DIC pre-sold the series to GMTV, and so the series reran on ITV2 in 2005 as part of the GMTV2 Kids strand.

By 2006, alongside the other Sonic cartoons, the series began to air on Pop, and by 2012, was airing on its sister channel Kix!

==== North America ====
In February 1998, it was announced that Bohbot Entertainment had acquired the North American broadcast rights to the series to air on their BKN syndicated strand. More information was revealed in January 1999. The series premiered in the country on 30 August 1999 as one of two "new" shows added to the newly-launched BKN Kids II block, where the series aired on weekday mornings at 6:00 AM Central Time, and ran until 22 October 1999.

The series also aired on the Sci-Fi Channel which BKN also had a broadcast deal with at the time, however, the episodes that were supposed to air on Fridays were skipped because Double Dragon and later King Arthur and the Knights of Justice were airing instead, therefore only 32 of the 40 Sonic Underground episodes aired on that channel.

In 2004, the show returned to syndicated television stations on weekends as part of the DIC Kids Network E/I strand. It, alongside fellow DIC series Mummies Alive! were the only two programs on the strand to not fulfill E/I requirements.

On 19 January 2006, CBS announced a multi-year deal with DIC to broadcast some of their shows on the "CBS's Secret Saturday Morning Slumber Party" segment, including Sonic Underground, however, the block would not end up running the show in the end.

In 2009, reruns of Sonic Underground aired on Firestone Communications' Sorpresa, a Hispanic children's station (Channel 850 on Time Warner Cable) in the United States, broadcasting the audio-dubbed Latin Spanish dub.

Re-runs of the series aired on Disney XD starting 11 June 2012 and ending on 14 December 2012. This marked the second time a Sonic the Hedgehog cartoon has aired on a Disney-themed channel, with the first being Adventures of Sonic the Hedgehog on Toon Disney (the predecessor of Disney XD) from 1998 to 2002.

The series aired in Canada on Teletoon.

==== Other regions ====
In Australia, Sonic Underground premiered on The Seven Network during The Big Breakfast in 1999.

The show was broadcast by KidsCo in regions the channel broadcast from.

In Poland the show aired on TV Puls 2 as a part of the Junior TV block.

== Home media ==
=== United States ===
In the United States, Sterling Entertainment released a VHS/DVD titled "Dr. Robotnik's Revenge" in July 2003, containing three episodes, and a bonus Super Mario Bros. episode on the DVD release. It was re-released by NCircle Entertainment in March 2007 without the bonus Mario episode. The Sterling versions of the Adventures of Super Mario Bros. 3 "King Koopa Katastrophe" and The Legend of Zelda "Ganon's Evil Tower" DVDs also included 1 and 2 episodes respectively as DVD bonuses which the NCircle reissues of both releases excluded. Sterling Entertainment's VHS/DVD release of Sonic Christmas Blast also included 3 episodes (2 on the VHS).

Shout! Factory and Vivendi Entertainment have released the complete series on DVD in Region 1 (NTSC) in two volume sets. Volume 1, simply entitled Sonic Underground, was released on 18 December 2007. It contains the first 20 episodes of the show on three discs, with disc three also including interviews with DIC's Robby London, Mike Piccirillo, an opening title animatic, and concept art. A bonus fourth disc is an audio CD containing eight songs from the series, including the opening theme. Sonic Underground: Volume 2 was released on 17 June 2008, featuring the remaining 20 episodes and another bonus audio CD featuring eight more songs from the series.

From 2007 until 2010, NCircle Entertainment released several single-release DVDs containing four episodes each:

VHS/DVD name	Episodes	Release date
The Queen Aleena Chronicles	"Wedding Bell Blues" "To Catch a Queen" "The Jewel of the Crown" "Country Crisis"	18 December 2007
Sonic to the Rescue	"The Last Resort" "Head Games" "Dunes Day" "The Deepest Fear"	19 February 2008
Secrets of the Chaos Emerald	"Friend or Foe?" "Flying Fortress" "No Hedgehog is an Island" "New Echidna in Town"	22 July 2008
Ready, Aim, Sonic!	"Come Out Wherever You Are" "Bug!" "The Big Melt" "The Art of Destruction"	21 July 2009
Legend Has It	"Getting to Know You" "Harmony or Something" "When in Rome..." "Six is a Crowd"	1 June 2010
Band on the Run	"Tangled Webs" "Artifact" "Sleepers" "Virtual Danger"	7 September 2010

NCircle also re-released Volumes 1 and 2 in 2013 and 2017, respectively. On 25 July 2023, they released the complete series as a four-disc set.

=== United Kingdom ===
In 2004, Anchor Bay UK obtained rights to distribute several DIC cartoons, including Sonic Underground on home video. The first two volumes were released on 31 May 2004 while the next two were released on 16 August 2004. There were plans for the remaining six volumes to be released separately, but they were instead released in a 10-DVD boxset in October 2004.

In July 2005, Avenue Entertainment released two budget DVDs containing two episodes each.

Delta Home Entertainment released the complete series again on DVD in June 2008 as a 4-disc set, with the fifth DVD containing the bonus features from the Shout! Factory DVD boxset. Delta Home Entertainment also released the four discs separately, with Disc 1 and 2 being released as "Beginnings" and "Who Do You Think You Are" in August 2008, and Discs 3 and 4 being released as "When in Rome" and "Country Crisis" in September 2008.

== Reception ==
Sonic Underground received mixed reviews: it was criticized for its complex plot and large amount of differences from the games, although some critics have defined the music as catchy. David Cornelius of DVD Talk said, "While many Sonic fans did not take too well to all the changes, preferring the original 'Sonic' cartoon to this stranger, sometimes darker, sometimes sillier incarnation, the series did win a small but loyal cult following. I fall more on the side of disappointment - for all the cleverness that went into crafting an all-new backstory, the episodes themselves are uninspired - but acknowledge the simple fact that it scores well with its target audience." GamesRadar called the show as one of "the absolute worst Sonic moments", criticizing the extra characters and the complex plot. Patrick Lee of The A.V. Club panned the series, calling it one of the most artistic failures to ever end up on television and "the result of several unrelated ideas forcibly squashed into one project". Comedian Chris Hardwick commented on the show's theme song, composed by Mike Piccirillo, claiming that "that guy sounds like he's trying to win his exwife back." Susan Arendt of Wired said "The songs are actually kind of catchy in a Saturday morning cartoon kind of way, but the band thing still seems a bit out of place, especially when the instruments turn into weapons." Emily Ashby of Common Sense Media said "Sonic Underground has some good things to offer kids, but only if they're ready for the complexities of its story" criticizing its complex plot but complimenting its low violence and ability to entertain children.

== Other media ==
The Sonic the Hedgehog comic from Archie Comics featured a story in one of its special issues in which the Sonic Underground continuity was featured. According to the comics' plot, the reality in which Sonic Underground takes place is one of many parallel universes that share elements with Sonic's own. In the story, Sonic Prime—hailing from the main universe in the comic series—joins forces with his counterpart and siblings to stop Dr. Robotnik, who has managed to assemble a monstrous battle machine known as the Giant Borg. Robotnik obtained the pieces for this machine due to being mistaken for one of his own counterparts by Evil Sonic, an evil counterpart of Sonic's who later came to be known as Scourge the Hedgehog

The Sonic Universe spin-off comic was originally scheduled to feature an epilogue to the unfinished Sonic Underground for its 50th issue. However, for unknown reasons this was replaced with a story focusing on one of Sonic's long-running enemies, Metal Sonic. The Underground Epilogue was put on hold indefinitely, due to Sega not permitting the show be featured in the comics. However, in 2013, during the events of Sonic & Mega Man: Worlds Collide by Archie Comics, Sonic Prime's multiverse ceased to exist when Dr. Eggman launched the Super Genesis Wave in conjunction with Dr. Wily, causing the Prime Zone to be irreversibly rewritten and the multiverse to collapse in on itself, destroying most prior known realities, including the Sonic Underground reality, and wiping all the inhabitants there away from existence, including all the characters within Sonic Underground there as well.
