= Tracy Nicole Chapman =

American actress

- Occupation: Actress
- Years active: 1993–present

Tracy Nicole Chapman is an American actress, best known for originating the role of Shenzi in the Broadway production of The Lion King. She also appeared on Broadway in The Who's Tommy, Caroline, or Change, and Cy Coleman's The Life. Other theatre credits include the Broadway revivals of How to Succeed in Business Without Really Trying, The Music Man, and Into the Woods. She also toured with Jelly's Last Jam, Dreamgirls, and Once On This Island. She was featured as an Urchin in Little Shop of Horrors opposite Jake Gyllenhaal at New York City Center in 2015.
