= The Who's Tommy =

Rock musical by Pete Townshend

- Broadway promotional poster
- Music: Pete Townshend
- Lyrics: Pete Townshend
- Book: Pete Townshend; Des McAnuff
- Basis: Tommy by The Who
- Premiere: 1 July 1992: La Jolla Playhouse, San Diego
- Productions: 1992 San Diego; 1993 Broadway; 1996 West End; 2015 Off-West End Revival; 2024 Broadway Revival
- Awards: List of awards Tony Award for Best Direction of a Musical; Tony Award for Best Original Score; Drama Desk Award for Outstanding Director of a Musical; Grammy Award for Best Musical Show Album; Laurence Olivier Award for Best Musical Revival; Laurence Olivier Award for Best Director

The Who's Tommy is a rock musical with music and lyrics by Pete Townshend and a book by Townshend and Des McAnuff. It is based on the 1969 rock opera Tommy by the Who.

== Productions ==
The musical opened at La Jolla Playhouse in San Diego, California, on 1 July 1992. The Broadway theatre debut was at the St. James Theatre on 29 March 1993 with 27 previews running through 10 April. The show then officially opened on 22 April 1993 and closed on 17 June 1995, after 900 performances. Produced by Sir George Martin and directed by Des McAnuff, with choreography by Wayne Cilento, and groundbreaking iconic projections by Wendall K. Harrington, the original cast included Michael Cerveris (Tommy), Marcia Mitzman (Mrs. Walker), Jonathan Dokuchitz (Captain Walker), Paul Kandel (Uncle Ernie) and Cheryl Freeman (The Gypsy/Acid Queen), plus an ensemble that included Alice Ripley, Christian Hoff, Norm Lewis, Tracy Nicole Chapman, Michael McElroy, Sherie Rene Scott and Rick Fitts.

A Canadian Production opened at the Elgin Theatre in Toronto on 1 March 1995, and played throughout the year. The production featured an entirely Canadian cast, and the lead character of Tommy was played by Tyley Ross. Once the Toronto run ended, the production went on a Canadian tour.

The original production ran 1995/1996 for 13 months in Germany at the Capitol Theatre in Offenbach (next to Frankfurt). The show officially opened on 28 April 1995 and closed on 16 June 1996. Cast included Michael Cerveris (Tommy), Helen Hobson (Mrs. Walker), Joe Lutton (Captain Walker), Roger Bart (Cousin Kevin), Bill Kocis (Onkel Ernie), Linda Dorsey (Acid Queen) plus an ensemble that included Stephen Bienskie, Nicci Brightman, Patrick Clancy, Tim Talman, and others. The show subsequently was produced by various touring companies throughout North America and Europe.

A production directed by Marcia Milgrom Dodge ran at the Bay Street Theatre in Sag Harbor, New York, from 13 June to 9 July 2006, with Euan Morton in the title role. The cast also included Mike McGowan (Captain Walker), Liz Pearce (Mrs Walker), Paul Binotto (Uncle Ernie), Josh Walden (Cousin Kevin), Shelby Braxton-Brooks (The Gypsy) and Noah Galvin as the ten-year-old Tommy.

A production ran in the West End at the Shaftesbury Theatre from 5 March 1996 until 8 February 1997, featuring Paul Keating (Tommy) and Kim Wilde (Mrs. Walker).

The original Broadway cast performed a one night only reunion benefit concert at the August Wilson Theatre in New York City on 15 December 2008. Produced by The Path Fund/Rockers on Broadway, the concert was a benefit for Broadway Cares/Equity Fights AIDS, the Broadway Dreams Foundation and the Bachmann-Strauss Dystonia and Parkinson Foundation.

Des McAnuff revived the musical at the Stratford Festival of Canada from 4 May until 19 October 2013 at the Avon Theatre in Stratford, Ontario.

Aria Entertainment and Greenwich Theatre revived the show in London at the Greenwich Theatre from 29 July until 23 August 2015.

A new production by New Wolsey Theatre, Ipswich (in co-production with Ramps on the Moon) began touring from March 2017 in Ipswich before heading to Nottingham Playhouse, West Yorkshire Playhouse, Birmingham Repertory Theatre, Theatre Royal Stratford East and Sheffield Theatres. It is directed by Kerry Michael and features original West End cast member Peter Straker as the Acid Queen (after previously playing the Narrator).

A production featuring Andy Mientus as Tommy opened on 27 April 2018 at the Denver Center for the Performing Arts.

A limited production opened at the Kennedy Center for the Performing Arts on 24 April 2019. The production starred Casey Cott as Tommy, Christian Borle as Captain Walker, and Mandy Gonzalez as Mrs. Walker. The production ran through 29 April 2019.

A 30th anniversary revival of the musical premiered at the Goodman Theatre in 2023, featuring Ali Louis Bourzgui as Tommy in a production directed by Des McAnuff. This production made some revisions to the script including the removal of "Tommy's Holiday Camp" and new rewrite of the verses of "We're Not Gonna Take It". On 26 October 2023, it was announced that this production would transfer to Broadway's Nederlander Theatre. The production opened on 28 March 2024. It closed on July 21, 2024, after 20 previews and 132 regular performances.

A national tour of the revival was announced to begin in fall 2025 launching from the Providence Performing Arts Center but did not materialize. A North American tour is set to launch from the Playhouse Square in Cleveland, OH, in fall 2026.

This musical inspired Data East's production of a pinball machine called The Who's Tommy Pinball Wizard, which used music, sound effects and artwork based on the original Broadway production; this machine was the third one after the 1975 pinball machine Wizard! and the 1976 machine Capt. Fantastic and the Brown Dirt Cowboy, both made by Bally and based on the 1975 movie. The former features an image of Roger Daltrey as the Pinball Wizard, the latter features an image of Elton John as the Pinball Champion.

== Plot ==
Note that there are several plot differences between the album, the film, and the stage production, though the general storyline is largely the same.

=== Prologue ===
An opening montage of London is presented, beginning in 1940 with the initial meeting and then marriage of the Walkers. Amidst World War II, the husband, Captain Walker, parachutes into Germany, where he is captured as a prisoner of war by the Nazis ("Overture"). Back in London at 22 Heathfield Gardens, the captain's brother Ernie delivers a care package to the pregnant Mrs Walker just as two officers arrive at the home to announce the disappearance and presumed death of her husband ("Captain Walker").

=== Act I ===
The following year, two nurses gently hand Mrs Walker her newborn son, Tommy; later, in 1945, American troops liberate Captain Walker's POW camp, proclaiming the end of the war ("It's a Boy" / "We've Won"). Mrs Walker has since attained a new lover, and they celebrate her twenty-first birthday and discuss marriage together with four-year-old Tommy ("Twenty-One"). To their surprise, Captain Walker enters the house and a fight erupts between Captain Walker and the boyfriend. Mrs Walker turns Tommy away, but he watches his father shoot the boyfriend to death through a large mirror. Captain and Mrs Walker embrace but soon realize what Tommy has witnessed, and violently shake him, telling him he did not see or hear anything ("What About the Boy"). The police arrive; Tommy simply gazes at the mirror in silence. A narrator—Tommy's older self—appears to the audience, introducing and framing the story of his exceptional childhood ("Amazing Journey").

Captain Walker is tried for murder but found not guilty by reasons of self-defense. However, Tommy fails to celebrate his father's release, and his family quickly realizes that he has apparently gone deaf, mute, and blind. Tommy's parents have him undergo a battery of medical tests, to no avail ("Sparks"). At ten years of age, Tommy's unresponsive state remains unchanged ("Amazing Journey – Reprise"). The Walkers all go to church and host a Christmas family dinner, though the family is unnerved that Tommy does not know that it is Christmas or understand its significance ("Christmas"). Everyone is stunned when Tommy responds only to his uncle Ernie's playing the French horn. Mr Walker, in a desperate attempt to reach his son, shouts "Tommy, can you hear me?" multiple times. Older Tommy, only visible to young Tommy, who persistently stares at the mirror, sings to him ("See Me, Feel Me").

The Walkers leave Tommy with a slew of vicious babysitters, including alcoholic and sexually abusive Uncle Ernie ("Do You Think It's Alright?" and "Fiddle About"), as well as his cousin Kevin, a sadistic bully ("Cousin Kevin"). Cousin Kevin and his friends take Tommy to a youth club where, to everyone's astonishment, Tommy plays pinball brilliantly ("Sensation"). Meanwhile, another doctor, a psychiatrist, tests Tommy yet again with no success ("Sparks – Reprise"). The desperate Captain Walker is approached by The Hawker and Harmonica Player ("Eyesight to the Blind") who promise a miraculous cure for Tommy. They take young Tommy to the Isle of Dogs to find a prostitute called The Gypsy, who tries to convince Captain Walker to let her spend time alone with Tommy, introducing him to drugs ("The Acid Queen"). Horrified by her methods, Captain Walker snatches Tommy away. By 1958, Tommy has apparently become a pinball-playing expert as Cousin Kevin and a group of adolescents await 17-year-old Tommy's appearance at the amusement arcade, where his rise to local popularity has begun ("Pinball Wizard").

=== Act II ===
By 1960, Tommy has become the local pinball champion and hero of the neighborhood lads ("Underture"). Captain Walker persists unsuccessfully in seeking doctors and a cure for Tommy ("There's a Doctor" and "Go to the Mirror!"). One doctor discovers that Tommy's senses do function but not at a self-aware or openly expressive level. On the street, a group of local louts surround Tommy ("Tommy, Can You Hear Me?") and carry him home. The Walkers, at their wits' end, passionately confront each other in an effort to reconcile and face the reality that Tommy might never be cured ("I Believe My Own Eyes"). Captain Walker leaves Mrs. Walker with Tommy. Tommy stares into the mirror blankly as his mother tries desperately to reach him one last time, before smashing the mirror in a rage ("Smash the Mirror"). With the mirror in pieces, Tommy suddenly becomes fully lucid and interactive for the first time since the age of four, and he leaves home ("I'm Free"). Through 1961 to 1963, news of Tommy's miraculous regaining of full consciousness receives huge media attention ("Miracle Cure"), Tommy is idolized by the public and the press ("Sensation – Reprise"), and he begins appearing in packed stadiums, playing pinball with a helmet that temporarily blinds and deafens him ("Pinball Wizard – Reprise"). Uncle Ernie tries to capitalise on Tommy's newfound stardom, by selling cheap souvenirs for a grand opening party of Tommy's new holiday camp, resulting from Tommy's cult-like following ("Tommy's Holiday Camp"). That night, an adolescent fan named Sally Simpson falls from the stage in her eagerness to touch Tommy and is pummeled by guards ("Sally Simpson"). Tommy, in horror, stops the show and tends to Sally. He says he has had enough and decides to go home.

Realizing how caught up in celebrity he has become, Tommy wishes to do something in return for his fans and invites them all back to his house ("Welcome"). Once there, the population of fans keeps growing, though Tommy generously, but naïvely, wishes to welcome everyone equally. Sally then asks Tommy how she can be more like him and less like herself ("Sally Simpson's Question"). He is confused, and insists that there is no reason for anyone to be like him, when everyone else already possesses the amazing gifts that he was deprived of most of his life. He suddenly realises that he had thought his fame came from his miraculous recovery, when it in fact arose due to his fans' desire for a spiritual leader, hoping he could communicate wisdom from his experience of not being able to hear, see, or talk for so long. Now, disenchanted with their hero for failing to provide the answers they wanted to be told to them, the crowd turns on him in anger and eventually leaves ("We're Not Gonna Take It"), leaving Tommy with just his family surrounding him. Tommy hears the voice of his ten-year-old self from the mirror ("See Me, Feel Me") and for a moment, to the horror of his family, seems to be reverting to his old state. Instead, he turns to his family, whom he has ignored during his stardom, and embraces them in acceptance, before he climactically reunites with his younger selves onstage ("Listening to You/Finale").

=== Plot differences between the three versions ===
The original 1969 album was much more ambiguous in its specific plot points than the stage musical and film versions. Originally, the song "Twenty-One" was called "1921" as the album version took place in a post-World War I setting. In the film, the story was changed to be post-World War II and the song was changed to "1951". In both the album and stage versions, the father comes home and kills the lover in the confrontation. Ken Russell's film made a reversal and killed Mr. Walker's character, having the lover then assume the role of a step-father to Tommy.

Pete Townshend made a number of lyrical changes to songs for the film version, many of which were utilized in the stage musical (these include revisions made to "It's a Boy", "Amazing Journey", and "Tommy's Holiday Camp", among others). The new pieces created for the film, however ("Bernie's Holiday Camp", "Champagne", "Mother and Son"), were not retained for the stage production. Instead, Townshend wrote a new piece called "I Believe My Own Eyes" in which the Walkers resign themselves to accepting Tommy's fate after years of trying.

Tommy's experience with the Acid Queen (Scene 11) is also handled differently between the album, movie, and stage productions. In both the album and movie, Tommy appears to have taken a drug from the Acid Queen which produced a visceral response in the otherwise mostly catatonic child. In the musical, his father brings him to see the Acid Queen, then changes his mind and leaves before Tommy partakes of her "charms".

The most fundamental difference in the story is the finale, which was rewritten in 1993. Originally, Tommy instructs his followers to become deaf, mute, and blind themselves to find a heightened state of enlightenment. The crowd rejects this and turns on him. In the stage version, Tommy tells them the opposite: to not try to emulate him, but to rather live out their own normal lives. Upon hearing this message, the crowd still rejects him out of a desire to hear a bolder message from him.

== Characters ==
Principals

- Tommy, age 16–25, A young pinball genius. Tenor.
- Captain Walker age: 25–35, Tommy's guilty father. Tenor.
- Mrs. Walker, age: 18–30, Tommy's weary mum. Pop Mezzo-soprano.

Other Tommys

- Tommy, age 3–7: child Tommy
- Tommy, age 8–12: preadolescent Tommy

Supporting roles

- Cousin Kevin, age: 15–20, Tommy's evil babysitting cousin. A young, loutish nuisance. Baritone.
- Uncle Ernie, age: 30–45, Tommy's perverted uncle. A lecherous bachelor. Tenor.
- The Lover, age: 25–30, Mrs. Walker's lover, killed by Captain Walker
- The Hawker, age: 20–50, An unsavory street man. Baritone
- The Gypsy, age: 20–35, A drug dealer and prostitute. Rock Mezzo-soprano
- The Specialist, age: 30–50, A very modern doctor who has new theories on how to cure Tommy. Baritone.
- Sally Simpson, age: 13–20, A typical teenybopper. Soprano.

== Notable casts ==
Character	San Diego	Broadway	US National Tour	Toronto	Frankfurt	Non-Equity Tour	West End	Stratford Festival	Washington D.C.	Chicago	Broadway Revival	North American Tour
Character	1992	1993		1995			1996	2013	2019	2023	2024	2026
Tommy	Michael Cerveris	Michael Cerveris	Steve Isaacs	Tyley Ross	Michael Cerveris	Michael Seelbach	Paul Keating	Robert Markus	Casey Cott	Ali Louis Bourzgui	Ali Louis Bourzgui	Collin Matthew Flanagan
Mrs. Walker	Marcia Mitzman Gaven	Marcia Mitzman Gaven	Jessica Molaskey	Jennifer Lyon	Helen Hobson	Erika Greene	Kim Wilde	Kira Guloien	Mandy Gonzalez	Alison Luff	Alison Luff	Mia Bergstrom
Captain Walker	Jonathan Dokuchitz	Jonathan Dokuchitz	Jason Workman	David Rogers	Joe Lutton	Michael J. Vergoth	Alistair Robins	Jeremy Kushnier	Christian Borle	Adam Jacobs	Adam Jacobs	Zach Fogel
Uncle Ernie	Paul Kandel	Paul Kandel	William Youmans	Frank Moore	Bill Kocis	Rob Krahenbuhl	Ian Bartholomew	Steve Ross	Manu Narayan	John Ambrosino	John Ambrosino	Peyton Cassity
Cousin Kevin	Anthony Barrile	Anthony Barrile	Roger Bart	Ted Dykstra	Roger Bart	Peter Connelly	Hal Fowler	Paul Alexander Nolan	Wesley Taylor	Bobby Conte	Bobby Conte	Kyle McFalls
The Acid Queen	Cheryl Freeman	Cheryl Freeman	Kennya Ramsey	Jinky Llamanzares	Linda Dorsey	Tracey Lee	Nicola Hughes	Jewelle Blackman	Kimberly Nichole	Christina Sajous	Christina Sajous	Kris Lyons
Hawker	Rick Fitts	Michael McElroy	Destan Owens	Thom Allison	Destan Owens	Keith Bocklet	Shaun Escoffery	Lee Siegel	Mykal Kilgore	Sheldon Henry	Sheldon Henry	Justin Lee-Price
Specialist	Rick Fitts	Norm Lewis	Destan Owens	Rudy Webb	Destan Owens	Tony Oakley	Gregg Brown	Matthew G. Brown	Charl Brown	Sheldon Henry	Sheldon Henry	Justin Lee-Price
Lover	Lee Morgan	Lee Morgan	Alec Timerman	Daniel Nathan Kramer	Tim Talman	Keith Bocklet	John Partridge	Sean Alexander Hauk	Rory Donovan	Nathan Lucrezio	Nathan Lucrezio	Greyson Taylor
Harmonica Player	Lee Morgan	Lee Morgan	Alec Timerman	Daniel Nathan Kramer	Tim Talman	Kevin Ray	John Partridge	Sean Alexander Hauk	Rory Donovan	Daniel Quadrino	Daniel Quadrino	Greyson Taylor
Pinball Lads	Donnie Kehr; Christian Hoff	Donnie Kehr; Christian Hoff	Anthony Galde; Clarke Thorell	Tim Howar; Jeremy Kushnier	Anthony Galde; Scott Pattison	Jason Reiff; John Houfe	Adrian Smith; James Gillan	Gabriel Antonacci; Matthew Armet	Nick Martinez; Kaleb Wells	Mia Mitrano; Jeremiah Alsop	Mia Mitrano; Jeremiah Alsop	Bo Bailey Trevor “TJay” Groce
Sally Simpson	Hilary Morse	Sherie Rene Scott	Hilary Morse	Jennifer Copping	Jackie Crawford	Shorey Walker	Gail Easdale	Jennifer Rider-Shaw	Taylor Iman Jones	Haley Gustafson	Haley Gustafson	Audrey Fisher

=== Notable cast replacements ===
==== Broadway ====
- Young Tommy – Emily Hart
- Mrs. Walker – Laura Dean, Jessica Molaskey, Alice Ripley
- Captain Walker – Jim Newman
- The Gypsy – Tracy Nicole Chapman

==== US National Tour ====
- Young Tommy – John Francis Daley
- Cousin Kevin – Tim Talman
- The Gypsy – Carla Renata
- Pinball Lad – Stephen Bienskie

== Song list ==
Act One

- "Overture" – Company
- "Captain Walker" – Officers
- "It's a Boy" / "We've Won" – Nurses and Mrs. Walker / Captain Walker and Allied Soldiers
- "Twenty-One" / "What About the Boy?" – Mrs. Walker and Boyfriend / Captain Walker and Mrs. Walker
- "Amazing Journey" – Tommy
- "Courtroom Scene" – Judge
- "Sparks" – Instrumental
- "Amazing Journey" (Reprise) – Tommy
- "Christmas" / "See Me, Feel Me" – Captain Walker, Mrs. Walker, Minister, Minister's Wife and Ensemble / Tommy
- "Do You Think It's Alright?" – Captain Walker and Mrs. Walker
- "Fiddle About" (music and lyrics by John Entwistle) – Uncle Ernie and Ensemble
- "See Me, Feel Me" (Reprise) – Tommy
- "Cousin Kevin" (music and lyrics by John Entwistle) – Cousin Kevin and Ensemble
- "Sensation" – Tommy and Ensemble
- "Sparks (Reprise)"
- "Eyesight to the Blind" (lyrics by Sonny Boy Williamson II, music and additional lyrics by Pete Townshend) – Hawker, Harmonica Player and Ensemble
- "The Acid Queen" – The Acid Queen
- "Pinball Wizard" – Local Lads, Cousin Kevin and Ensemble

Act Two

- "Underture (Entr'acte)" – Ensemble
- "It's a Boy (Reprise)" / "There's a Doctor" – Captain Walker and Mrs. Walker
- "Go to the Mirror!" / "Listening to You" – Specialist, Specialist's Assistant, Captain Walker and Mrs. Walker / Tommy, Tommy (Age 10) and Tommy (Age 4)
- "Tommy, Can You Hear Me?" – Local Lads
- "I Believe My Own Eyes" – Captain Walker and Mrs. Walker
- "Smash the Mirror" – Mrs. Walker
- "I'm Free" – Tommy
- "Streets of London 1961–3 (Miracle Cure)" – News Vendor and Local Lads
- "Sensation (Reprise)" – Tommy and Ensemble
- "I'm Free" (Reprise) / "Pinball Wizard" (Reprise) – Tommy and Company
- "Tommy's Holiday Camp" (music and lyrics by Keith Moon) – Uncle Ernie †
- "Sally Simpson" – Cousin Kevin, Security Guards, Sally Simpson, Mr. Simpson and Mrs. Simpson
- "Welcome" – Tommy and Ensemble
- "Sally Simpson's Question" – Sally Simpson, Tommy
- "We're Not Gonna Take It" – Tommy and Ensemble
- "See Me, Feel Me" (Final Reprise) / "Listening to You" (Reprise) – Tommy and Company

† Cut from the 2024 Broadway Revival

== Recordings ==
- The Who's Tommy – Original Cast Recording (1993)

== Awards and nominations ==
=== Original Broadway production ===
Year	Award	Category	Nominee	Result
1993	Tony Award	Best Musical		Nominated
1993	Tony Award	Best Book of a Musical	Pete Townshend and Des McAnuff	Nominated
1993	Tony Award	Best Performance by a Featured Actor in a Musical	Michael Cerveris	Nominated
1993	Tony Award	Best Performance by a Featured Actor in a Musical	Paul Kandel	Nominated
1993	Tony Award	Best Performance by a Featured Actress in a Musical	Marcia Mitzman	Nominated
1993	Tony Award	Best Direction of a Musical	Des McAnuff	Won
1993	Tony Award	Best Choreography	Wayne Cilento	Won
1993	Tony Award	Best Original Score	Pete Townshend	Won
1993	Tony Award	Best Scenic Design	John Arnone	Won
1993	Tony Award	Best Costume Design	David C. Woolard	Nominated
1993	Tony Award	Best Lighting Design	Chris Parry	Won
1993	Drama Desk Award	Outstanding Musical		Nominated
1993	Drama Desk Award	Outstanding Orchestrations	Steven Margoshes	Nominated
1993	Drama Desk Award	Outstanding Director of a Musical	Des McAnuff	Won
1993	Drama Desk Award	Outstanding Choreography	Wayne Cilento	Won
1993	Drama Desk Award	Outstanding Set Design	John Arnone and Wendall K. Harrington	Won
1993	Drama Desk Award	Outstanding Costume Design	David C. Woolard	Nominated
1993	Drama Desk Award	Outstanding Lighting Design	Chris Parry	Won
1993	Drama Desk Award	Outstanding Sound Design	Steve Canyon Kennedy	Won
1993	Grammy Award	Best Musical Show Album	Sir George Martin	Won
1993	Theatre World Award		Michael Cerveris	Won

=== Original London production ===
Year	Award	Category	Nominee	Result
1997	Laurence Olivier Award	Best Musical Revival		Won
1997	Laurence Olivier Award	Best Actor in a Musical	Paul Keating	Nominated
1997	Laurence Olivier Award	Best Performance in a Supporting Role in a Musical	James Gillan	Nominated
1997	Laurence Olivier Award	Best Director	Des McAnuff	Won
1997	Laurence Olivier Award	Best Theatre Choreographer	Wayne Cilento	Nominated
1997	Laurence Olivier Award	Best Set Design	John Arnone	Nominated
1997	Laurence Olivier Award	Best Costume Design	David C. Woolard	Nominated
1997	Laurence Olivier Award	Best Lighting Design	Chris Parry	Won

=== 2024 Broadway revival ===
Year	Award	Category	Nominee	Result
2024	Tony Awards	Best Revival of a Musical		Nominated
2024	Drama League Awards	Outstanding Revival of a Musical		Nominated
2024	Drama League Awards	Outstanding Direction of a Musical	Des McAnuff	Nominated
2024	Drama League Awards	Distinguished Performance	Ali Louis Bourzgui	Nominated
2024	Outer Critics Circle Awards	Outstanding Revival of a Musical		Nominated
2024	Outer Critics Circle Awards	Outstanding Lead Performer of a Musical	Ali Louis Bourzgui	Nominated
2024	Outer Critics Circle Awards	Outstanding Choreography (Broadway or Off-Broadway)	Lorin Latarro	Nominated
2024	Outer Critics Circle Awards	Outstanding Lighting Design (Broadway or Off-Broadway)	Amanda Zieve	Nominated
2024	Outer Critics Circle Awards	Outstanding Sound Design (Broadway or Off-Broadway)	Gareth Owen	Nominated
2024	Outer Critics Circle Awards	Outstanding Video/Projections (Broadway or Off-Broadway)	Peter Nigrini	Won
2024	Drama Desk Awards	Outstanding Fight Choreography	Steve Rankin	Nominated
2024	Theatre World Award		Ali Louis Bourzgui	Won
2024	Chita Rivera Awards	Outstanding Choreography in a Broadway Show	Lorin Latarro	Nominated
