= Drama Desk Award for Outstanding Puppet Design =

Annual award

- Awarded for: Outstanding Puppet Design
- Location: New York City
- Country: United States
- Presented by: Drama Desk
- First award: 1998
- Currently held by: Axtell Expressions, Amaze (2026)
- Website: dramadesk.org (defunct)

The Drama Desk Award for Outstanding Puppetry is an annual award presented by Drama Desk in recognition of achievements in theatre across collective Broadway, off-Broadway and off-off-Broadway productions in New York City. The award was first presented at the 1998 ceremony, as the Drama Desk Award for Outstanding Puppet Design, then suspended from use until the 2017 ceremony. The current name was introduced as of the 2023 ceremony.

Unlike some Drama Desk Awards, the award for Outstanding Puppetry combines plays and musicals into a single category. Michael Curry holds the record for most wins in the category with two, while also being tied with Amanda Villalobos for most nominations, with three each.

== Winners and nominees ==
Key

and bold indicates the winner.

=== 1990s ===
Year	Designer	Production	Ref.
1998	**Julie Taymor and Michael Curry**	**The Lion King**	
1998	The Big Nazo Studio	Jackie: An American Life	
1998	Bruce Schwartz	Ballad of Yachiyo	
1998	Basil Twist	Tell-Tale	

=== 2010s ===
Year	Designer	Production	Ref.
2017	**Basil Twist**	**Charlie and the Chocolate Factory**	
2017	Lyndie Wright and Sarah Wright	946: The Amazing Story of Adolphus Tips	
2018
2018	**Michael Curry**	**Frozen**	
2018	Finn Caldwell and Nick Barnes	Angels in America	
2018	Charlie Kanev, Sarah Nolan, and Jonathan Levin	A Hunger Artist	
2018	Vandy Wood	The Artificial Jungle	
2019
2019	**Sonny Tilders**	**King Kong**	
2019	Michael Curry	Beetlejuice	
2019	Tschabalala Self	Daddy	

=== 2020s ===
Year	Designer	Production	Ref.
2020	**Raphael Mishler**	**Tumacho**	
2020	Rockefeller Productions	Paddington Gets in a Jam	
2020	Amanda Villalobos	Is This a Room	
2021	No awards: New York theatres shuttered, March 2020 to September 2021, due to the COVID-19 pandemic in New York City.		
2022
2022	**James Ortiz**	**The Skin of Our Teeth**	
2022	Amanda Villalobos	Wolf Play	
2022	Rockefeller Productions	Winnie the Pooh	
2023	**Nick Barnes & Finn Caldwell**	**Life of Pi**	
2023	John Leader	Wuthering Heights	
2023	James Ortiz and Kennedy Kanagawa	Into the Woods	
2023	Kirjan Waage	The Immortal Jellyfish Girl	
2024	**Ray Wetmore, JR Goodman, and Camille Labarre**	**Water for Elephants**	
2024	Matt Acheson	Hotel Happy	
2024	Adrian Kohler & Handspring Puppet Company	Life & Times of Michael K	
2024	David Valentine	Poor Yella Rednecks	
2025	**Amanda Villalobos**	Becoming Eve	
2025	Dorothy James	Bill's 44th	
2025	Tom Lee	See What I Wanna See	
2025	Simple Mischief Studio	Small Acts of Daring Invention	
2025	Kirjan Waage	Dead as a Dodo	
2026
2026	**Axtell Expressions**	**Amaze**	
2026	Emily Batsford & Yuliya Tsukerman	Cumulo	
2026	Julian Crouch	Goddess	
2026	Monkey Boys Productions	The Burning Cauldron of Fiery Fire	

== Multiple wins ==
2 wins

- Michael Curry

== Multiple nominations ==
3 nominations

- Michael Curry
- Amanda Villalobos

2 nominations

- Basil Twist
- Finn Caldwell
- Nick Barnes
- Rockefeller Productions
- James Ortiz
- Kirjan Waage
