= Big Nose =

Big Nose may refer to:

== People ==
- Big Nose Kate, nickname of Mary Katherine Horony Cummings (1849 – 1940), American outlaw and gambler
- Big Nose George, nickname of George Parrott (1834 – 1881), American highwayman and cattle rustler
- Francis of the Big Nose (François du Grand Nez), nickname of Francis I of France (1494 – 1547), King of France

== Fictional characters ==
- Alternate name of The Little Man in the animated television series Pink Panther and Pals
- Big Nose the Caveman, character and platform game
- "Big Nose", original name of the character "Debbie the Dog Mom" from the film Everything Everywhere All at Once

== Others ==
- Big Noses, nickname given to the Belgian Railways Class 54 (along with the similar Series 52 and 53) diesel locomotives
- Big Nose Mountain (Cerro El Narizón), a mountain peak in Jocotenango, Guatemala
- "Big Nose", song from the Poison Clan album Poisonous Mentality
- Anti-Semitic stereotype of the Jewish nose

== See also ==
- Schnozzola (meaning "big nose"), Italicized nickname of American comedian Jimmy Durante
- Big Nazo, Rhode Island performance group
- Big Ears
