= The Lion King (musical) =

Musical by Roger Allers and Irene Mecchi

- Broadway promotional poster
- Music: Elton John (Note: Additional music by Lebo M, Mark Mancina, Jay Rifkin, Tsidii Le Loka, and Hans Zimmer)
- Lyrics: Tim Rice (Note: Additional lyrics by Lebo M, Mark Mancina, Jay Rifkin, Tsidii Le Loka, Julie Taymor, and Hans Zimmer)
- Book: Roger Allers; Irene Mecchi
- Basis: The Lion King by: Irene Mecchi; Jonathan Roberts; Linda Woolverton
- Premiere: July 8, 1997: Orpheum Theatre, Minneapolis
- Productions: 1997 Minneapolis; 1997 Broadway; 1999 West End; 2002 North America tour; 2003 North America tour; 2012 UK tour; 2017 North America tour; 2018 International tour; 2019 UK & Ireland tour
- Awards: Tony Award for Best Musical

The Lion King is a stage musical with a book by Roger Allers and Irene Mecchi based on the 1994 Walt Disney Animation Studios' film of the same name. Directed by Julie Taymor, the musical features actors in animal costumes as well as giant, hollow puppets. The show is produced by Disney Theatrical Productions and features songs from the original film by Elton John and Tim Rice, while the majority of new songs were contributed by Lebo M, Mark Mancina, Jay Rifkin, Tsidii Le Loka, Taymor, and Hans Zimmer.

The musical debuted on July 8, 1997, in Minneapolis, Minnesota at the Orpheum Theatre and was an instant success before premiering on Broadway at the New Amsterdam Theater on October 15, 1997, in many previews with the official opening on November 13, 1997. On June 13, 2006, the Broadway production moved to the Minskoff Theatre to make way for the musical version of Mary Poppins, where it is still running after more than 11,000 performances. It is Broadway's third longest-running show in history and the highest grossing Broadway production of all time, having grossed more than $2 billion.

== Production history ==
The musical debuted on July 8, 1997, in Minneapolis, Minnesota, at the Orpheum Theatre and was successful before premiering on Broadway at the New Amsterdam Theatre on October 15, 1997, in previews, with the official opening on November 13, 1997. On June 13, 2006, to make way for the Broadway production of Mary Poppins, the show moved to the Minskoff Theatre, where it is still running after more than 11,000 performances. It is Broadway's third longest-running show in history, and has grossed more than $2 billion, making it the highest grossing Broadway production of all time. Over 124 million people worldwide have seen the musical and it has earned numerous awards and honors, including six Tony Awards, one for Best Musical and Best Direction of a Musical, making director Julie Taymor the first woman to earn such an honor.

The show opened in the West End's Lyceum Theatre on October 19, 1999, and is still running after more than 10,000 performances. The cast of the West End production were invited to perform at the Royal Variety Performance in 1999 and 2008, in the presence of senior members of the British royal family. The theatre flooded on May 11, 2020, while the theatre was closed due to the COVID-19 pandemic. The Lion King reopened at the Lyceum in July 2021.

In September 2014, The Lion King became the top-earning title in box-office history for both stage works and films, surpassing the record previously held by The Phantom of the Opera. The musical has grossed more than $11 billion worldwide.

As of March 12, 2020, the show suspended production on Broadway due to the COVID-19 pandemic. The Lion King resumed Broadway performances on September 14, 2021. When a new Covid variant caused absences in January 2022, one of the actors playing Young Simba played Young Nala during a performance. During the week ending January 1, 2023, The Lion King achieved the highest weekly gross in Broadway history with $4.3 million.

The West End cast performed at a concert for the Platinum Jubilee of Elizabeth II at Buckingham Palace in June 2022.

== Synopsis ==
=== Act I ===
As the sun rises, Rafiki the mandrill calls the animals to Pride Rock. She greets King Mufasa and Queen Sarabi before presenting their cub to the gathered animals ("Circle of Life"). Elsewhere, Mufasa's brother, Scar, laments his lost chance at becoming King. Back at her baobab tree, Rafiki paints an image of the cub and asks the spirits to conjure the new prince's name: Simba.

Time passes and Simba grows into a lively young cub ("Grasslands Chant"). Mufasa shows Simba the Pride Lands from the top of Pride Rock and explains that everything exists in a delicate balance known as the Circle of Life. Mufasa warns Simba not to stray beyond the boundaries of the Pride Lands, pointing out a shadowy area in the distance. Zazu, a hornbill who acts as Mufasa's advisor, arrives and delivers his daily report on the state of affairs in the King's domain ("The Morning Report", now cut from the Broadway production).

Simba goes to see his Uncle Scar. The scheming lion piques the cub's curiosity by mentioning the elephant graveyard, where Simba is forbidden to go. Meanwhile, the lionesses go hunting ("The Lioness Hunt"). Simba arrives and asks his best friend, a female cub named Nala, to come with him to the elephant graveyard. He lies to the lionesses about where they are going, and Sarafina (Nala's mother) and Sarabi allow the cubs to go, escorted by Zazu. Simba and Nala formulate a plan and manage to lose Zazu, while Simba brags about his future position ("I Just Can't Wait to Be King").

The cubs go to the graveyard and begin to explore. Zazu catches up, but they are confronted by three hyenas: Shenzi, Banzai and Ed. The hyenas intend to eat the trespassers and they gloat about their find ("Chow Down"). Mufasa rescues the cubs and frightens off the hyenas.

Mufasa is disappointed and angry at Simba's reckless disobedience, and explains the difference between bravery and bravado. Mufasa tells Simba about the great kings of the past and how they watch over everything from the stars ("They Live in You"). Mufasa says that he will always be there for his son. Later he discusses Simba's behavior with Zazu, who reminds Mufasa that he had the same tendency to get into trouble at Simba's age.

Back at the elephant graveyard, Scar tells the hyenas of his plan to kill Mufasa and Simba so that he can become king. He raises an army of hyenas, promising that they will never go hungry again if they support him ("Be Prepared"). Scar takes Simba to a gorge and tells him to wait there. On Scar's signal, the hyenas start a wildebeest stampede into the gorge ("The Stampede"). Scar tells Mufasa that Simba is trapped in the gorge. Mufasa leaps into the stampede and manages to save his son, but as he tries to escape, Scar throws him off the cliff back into the stampede, killing him. Scar convinces Simba that his father's death was his fault and tells him to run away, but as he leaves, Scar orders the hyenas to kill him. Simba escapes but the hyenas tell Scar that he is dead. Rafiki and the lionesses mourn the deaths ("Rafiki Mourns"). Scar claims the throne and allows the hyenas into the Pride Lands ("Be Prepared (Reprise)"). Rafiki returns to her tree and smears the drawing of Simba, while Sarabi and Nala quietly grieve.

Out in the desert, Simba collapses from heat exhaustion. Vultures begin to circle, but are scared away by Timon the meerkat and Pumbaa the warthog. Simba feels responsible for Mufasa's death, but the duo take the cub to their jungle home and show him their carefree way of life and bug diet ("Hakuna Matata"). Simba grows to adulthood in the jungle.

=== Act II ===
The chorus, dressed in colorful clothes with ornate bird puppets and kites, begin the second act ("One by One"). As the song ends, however, the beautiful birds are replaced by vultures and gazelle skeletons. Under Scar's rule, the Circle of Life is out of balance and a drought has hit the Pride Lands. Zazu, now a prisoner of Scar, listens to the king's woes. The hyenas are complaining about the lack of food, but Scar is only concerned with himself and why he is not loved. He is haunted by visions of Mufasa and rapidly switches between delusional confidence and paranoid despair ("The Madness of King Scar"). Nala arrives to confront Scar about the famine and Scar decides she will be his queen and give him cubs. Nala fiercely rebukes him and resolves to leave the Pride Lands to find help. Rafiki and the lionesses bless her for her journey ("Shadowland").

Back in the jungle, Timon and Pumbaa want to sleep, but the restless Simba is unable to settle. Annoyed, Simba leaves them, but Timon and Pumbaa lose their courage and follow him. Simba leaps across a fast-moving river and challenges Timon to do the same. Timon falls in and is swept downstream. He grabs a branch over a waterfall and calls for Simba's help, but Simba is paralyzed by a flashback of Mufasa's death. Timon falls from the branch and Simba snaps out of the flashback, rescuing his friend. Simba is ashamed that Timon nearly died because of his recklessness.

The three friends settle to sleep and discuss the stars. Simba recalls Mufasa's words, but his friends laugh at the notion of dead kings watching them. Simba leaves, expressing his loneliness and bitterly recalling Mufasa's promise to be there for him ("Endless Night"). Rafiki hears the song on the wind, joyfully realizes that Simba is alive, and draws a mane onto her painting of Simba.

In the jungle, Pumbaa is hunted and chased by a lioness. Simba confronts her and saves his friend, but recognizes the lioness as Nala. She is amazed to find Simba alive, knowing that he is the rightful king. Timon and Pumbaa are confused, but Simba asks them to leave him and Nala alone. Timon realizes what is happening and laments the end of Simba's Hakuna Matata lifestyle ("Can You Feel the Love Tonight"). Nala tells Simba about the devastated Pride Lands, but Simba still feels responsible for Mufasa's death and refuses to return home.

On his own, Simba meets Rafiki, who explains that his father lives on ("He Lives in You"). Mufasa's spirit appears in the sky and tells Simba he is the one true king and must take his place in the Circle of Life. Reawakened, Simba finds his courage and heads for home. Meanwhile, Nala wakes Timon and Pumbaa to ask where Simba is, and Rafiki appears to tell them all the news. The three of them catch up with him in the Pride Lands, where he witnesses the ruin of his home. Timon and Pumbaa distract some hyenas by doing the Charleston, allowing Simba and Nala to reach Pride Rock.

Scar calls for Sarabi and demands to know why the lionesses are not hunting. Sarabi stands up to him about the lack of anything to hunt, angrily comparing him to Mufasa, and Scar strikes his sister-in-law, saying he's ten times the king Mufasa was. Enraged, Simba reveals himself. Scar forces a confession of murder from Simba and corners him. Believing that he has won, Scar taunts Simba by admitting that he killed Mufasa. Furious, Simba recovers and forces Scar to reveal the truth to the lionesses ("Simba Confronts Scar"). Simba's friends fight the hyenas while Simba battles Scar to the top of Pride Rock. Scar begs for his life, blaming the hyenas for everything. Simba lets him leave out of mercy, but Scar attacks again. Simba blocks the attack and Scar falls from the cliff. The hyenas, who heard Scar's betrayal and are still starving, tear him to shreds.

With the battle won, Simba's friends come forward and acknowledge Simba as the rightful king. Simba ascends Pride Rock and roars out across the kingdom ("King of Pride Rock"). The Pride Lands recover and the animals gather in celebration as Rafiki presents Simba and Nala's newborn cub, continuing the Circle of Life ("Circle of Life (Reprise)").

== Songs ==
Song	Written by	Performed by
Act I
"Circle of Life"	Elton John and Tim Rice	Rafiki and Company
"Grasslands Chant"	Lebo M	Company
"The Morning Report" +	Elton John and Tim Rice	Zazu, Young Simba, and Mufasa
"The Lioness Hunt"	Lebo M	Lionesses
"I Just Can't Wait to Be King"	Elton John and Tim Rice	Young Simba, Young Nala, Zazu, and Ensemble
"Chow Down"	Elton John and Tim Rice	Shenzi, Banzai, and Ed
"They Live in You"	Mark Mancina, Jay Rifkin, and Lebo M	Mufasa and Company
"Be Prepared"	Elton John and Tim Rice	Scar, Shenzi, Banzai, Ed, and Company
"The Stampede"	Hans Zimmer and Lebo M	Company
"Rafiki Mourns"	Tsidii Le Loka	Rafiki, Sarabi, Young Nala, Ensemble
"Hakuna Matata"	Elton John and Tim Rice	Timon, Pumbaa, Young Simba, Simba, and Ensemble
Act II
"One by One"	Lebo M	Company
"The Madness of King Scar"	Elton John and Tim Rice	Scar, Zazu, Banzai, Shenzi, Ed and Nala
"Shadowland"	Hans Zimmer, Lebo M, and Mark Mancina	Nala and Company
"Endless Night"	Julie Taymor, Lebo M, Hans Zimmer, and Jay Rifkin	Simba and Company
"Can You Feel the Love Tonight"	Elton John and Tim Rice	Timon, Pumbaa, Simba, Nala, and Company
"He Lives in You"	Mark Mancina, Jay Rifkin, and Lebo M	Rafiki, Simba and Company
"Simba Confronts Scar"	Mark Mancina and Robert Elhai	Instrumental
"King of Pride Rock/Circle of Life (Reprise)"	Hans Zimmer and Lebo M/Elton John and Tim Rice	The Company

+ Cut from the show as of June 27, 2010

== Differences between the musical and film ==
The musical incorporates several changes and additions to the storyline as compared to the film. The mandrill Rafiki's gender was changed to a female role because Taymor observed that there was generally no leading female character in the film. Rafiki was portrayed by Tsidii Le Loka in the original Broadway musical, and by Josette Bushell-Mingo in the original London production.

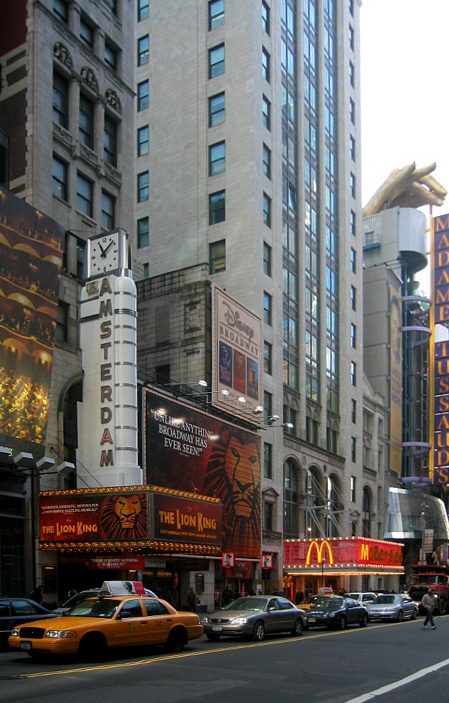
The Lion King on Broadway showing originally at the New Amsterdam Theater (shown); it is now showing at the Minskoff.

Several new scenes are present, including a conversation between Mufasa and Zazu about Mufasa's parenting and a perilous scene in which Timon finds himself nearly drowning in a waterfall while Simba feels powerless to help him. A major narrative addition is the depiction of Nala's departure in the scene "The Madness of King Scar", where the mentally deteriorating villain tries to make Nala his mate. Nala refuses and later announces her intention to depart the Pride Lands and find help. She receives the blessings of the lionesses and Rafiki during the new song "Shadowland".

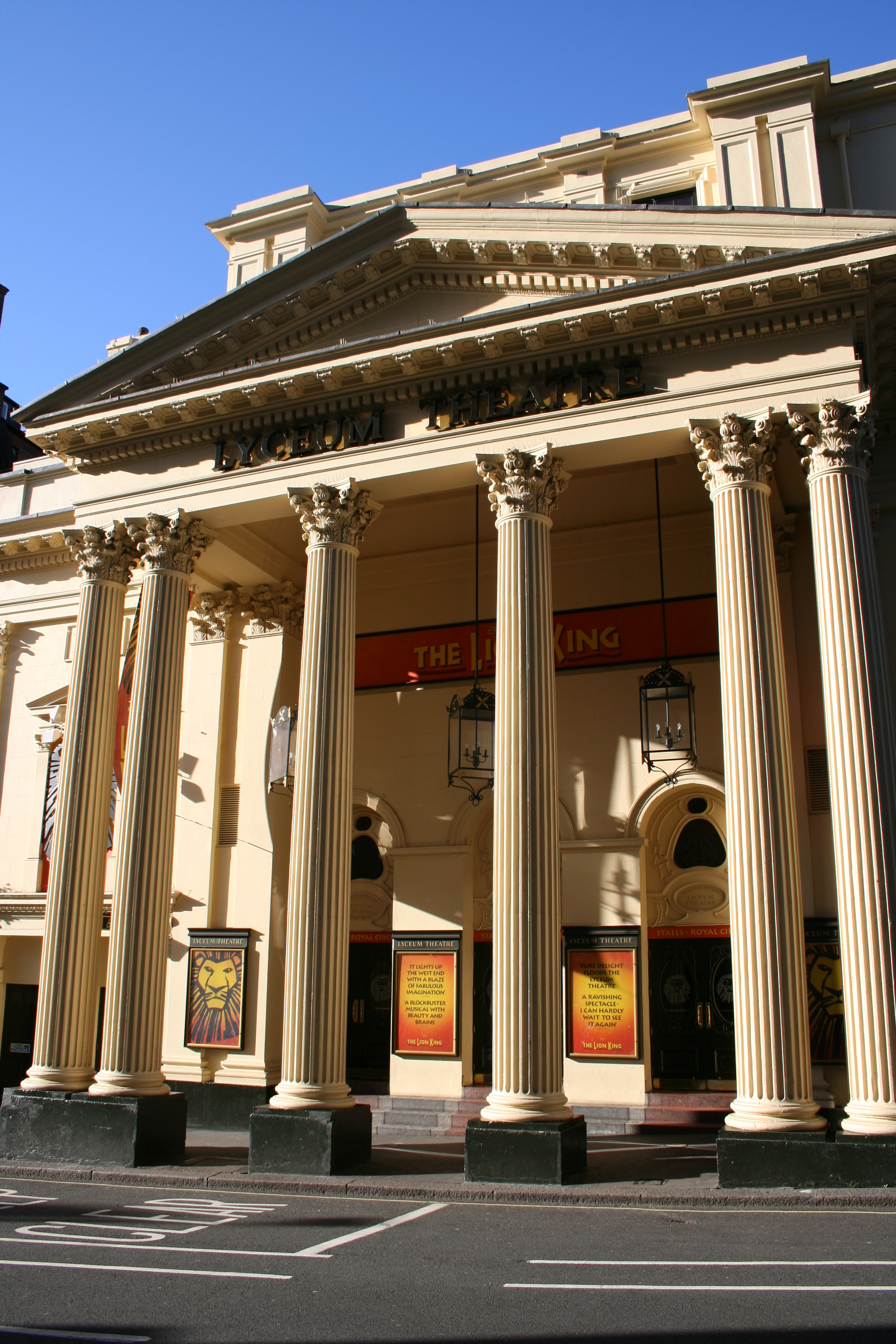
The Lion King in the West End

Like its predecessor, the Beauty and the Beast musical, the show adds more songs to its stage production, including "Morning Report", sung by Zazu the hornbill and later added to the film for the Platinum Edition DVD release. "Shadowland" originally featured on the CD Rhythm of the Pride Lands with Zulu lyrics as "Lea Halelela", was adapted for the musical with new English lyrics. It is sung by Nala, the lionesses, and Rafiki. "Endless Night", also from Rhythm of the Pride Lands with Zulu lyrics as "Lala", is sung by Simba while reflecting on Mufasa's promise to always be there. "One by One", from the Rhythm of the Pride Lands CD, was adapted as the rousing African-styled entr'acte sung by the chorus at the opening of the second act.

Many of the animals portrayed in the production are actors in costume using extra tools to move their costumes. For example, the giraffes are portrayed by actors walking on stilts. For principal characters such as Mufasa and Scar, the costumes feature mechanical headpieces that can be raised and lowered to foster the illusion of a cat "lunging" at another. Other characters, such as the hyenas, Zazu, Timon, and Pumbaa, are portrayed by actors in life-sized puppets or costumes. The Timon character is described by Taymor as one of the hardest roles to master because the movement of the puppet's head and arms puts a strain on the actor's arms, back, and neck.

A new section of the production, the Lioness Hunt, features a particularly complicated dance sequence for the actresses, and the dance is made even more difficult by the large headpieces worn during the scene.

As of June 27, 2010, nine minutes of the Broadway version were cut, among them the entire "Morning Report" musical number. The song was also removed from subsequent productions and cast recordings, such as the Spanish one.

== Productions ==
=== United States ===
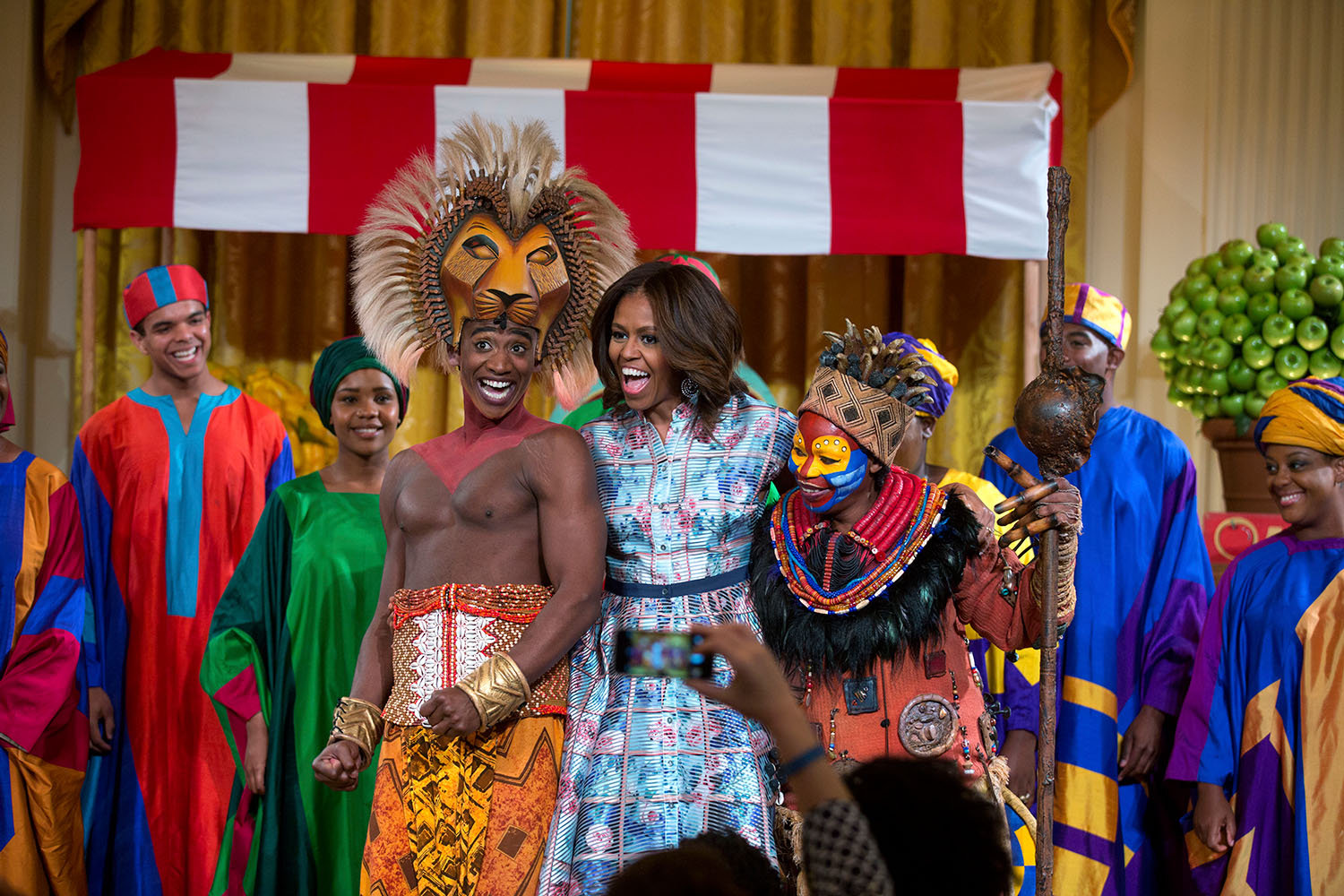
First Lady Michelle Obama joins the cast of the U.S. touring company onstage after their performance at the Kids' State Dinner in the East Room of the White House

As of 2022, the musical is touring North America for the third time. This tour, named the Rafiki Tour, began on October 26, 2017. The tour version is very similar to the original Broadway production; however, certain scenic elements which rise out of the stage floor (such as Pride Rock, the stampede, and the grasslands) were converted to less costly configurations for the touring productions. The sun during the opening is reduced in size for the shorter-lasting tours. Stage sizes are also smaller, and the size of the pit orchestra is decreased. The first national tour (Gazelle Tour) launched on April 17, 2002, and closed on July 23, 2017. The second tour (Cheetah Tour) began on April 23, 2003, and ended on March 2, 2008.

A Las Vegas production opened at Mandalay Bay on May 15, 2009, with previews beginning May 5, 2009. The Las Vegas cast performed on the ninth season of the American dance competition Dancing With the Stars on September 23, 2009. Led by Buyi Zama, the cast performed Circle of Life. When this production closed, on December 30, 2011, it turned into the second longest run the show had in a same American city (only coming after Broadway), running longer than the 2000–2003 Los Angeles Production.

A Los Angeles production began performances at the Pantages Theatre on September 29, 2000, with an official opening on October 19, 2000. The show closed on January 12, 2003, after 952 performances. The cast of this production performed a set of the show's songs in The Tonight Show with Jay Leno on October 2, 2001. The cast was led by Fuschia Walker.

=== Canada ===
A Canadian production was staged in Toronto and ran for nearly four years at the Princess of Wales Theatre. The show was directed by the original director Julie Taymor and premiered on April 25, 2000. The Lion King ran until January 2004 when it had its final performance. This first Canadian staging comprised 1,560 performances and was seen by 2.9 million people according to David Mirvish, whose Mirvish Productions theater and management company owns and operates the theater. The Degrassi star Raymond Ablack starred as Young Simba in 2001. The show returned for a five-week engagement that began in April 2011, as part of the North American tour.

A second open-ended production began performances at the same Princess of Wales Theatre on November 2, 2024, and ran until August 30, 2025.

=== Mexico ===
The musical had a limited run in Mexico City from January 3 to 27, 2008, as part of the U.S. national tour.

A Spanish-language production ran from May 7, 2015, to January 14, 2018, at the Teatro Telcel in Mexico City for 930 performances. Carlos Rivera returned to the role of Simba, which he also took in Spain four years earlier. The lyrics of the songs of this production differed from the European Spanish one. South-African actress Shirley Hlahatse was chosen as Rafiki, marking the first time in years a completely new actress was elected for that role.

The first Mexican revival premiered at the same Teatro Telcel on March 20, 2025.

=== South America ===
A Brazilian production debuted at the Teatro Renault in São Paulo on March 28, 2013. The cast contained mainly Brazilian actors and seven South African actors. The Portuguese lyrics were translated by Brazilian singer Gilberto Gil. Actress Phindile Mkhize, who had previously performed in many of the show's productions, was selected as Rafiki for this production, leaving in October 2013 and being replaced by Ntsepa Pitjeng. The show closed its doors on December 14, 2014.

A Brazilian revival ran at the same Teatro Renault from July 19, 2023, to July 28, 2024.

=== Europe ===
==== United Kingdom and Ireland ====
After the success of the Broadway show, the show opened in the United Kingdom in on October 19, 1999. The cast included Cornell John as Mufasa, Luke Youngblood as Young Simba, Dominique Moore as Young Nala, Martyn Ellis as Pumbaa, Simon Gregor as Timon, Rob Edwards as Scar, Paul J. Medford as Banzai and Josette Bushell-Mingo as Rafiki. As of October 2019, it has been playing at the Lyceum Theatre in London for 20 years. Taymor directed the British production of the show, with Melissa De Melo as the producer. The show also toured the UK from 2012 until March 2015.

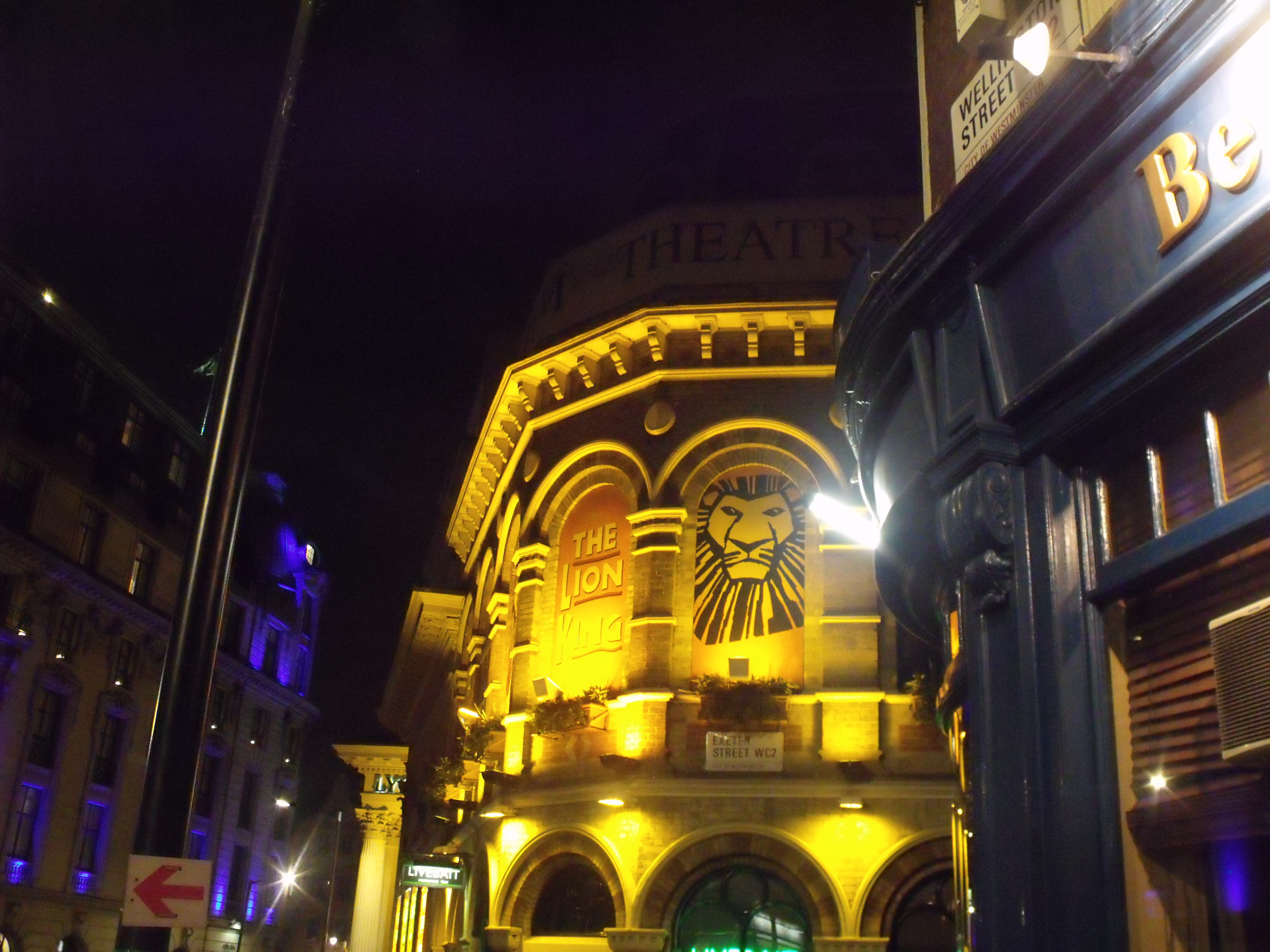
London; Lyceum Theatre

The West End cast of the show performed twice at the traditional Royal Variety Performance: in 1999 (led by Josette Bushell-Mingo) and 2008 (led by Brown Lindiwe Mkhize). In both performances, the song Circle of Life was performed. The company also performed at the show Strictly Come Dancing special Strictly African Dancing, broadcast in 2005, led once again by Mkhize and performed the same song.

For the U.K. productions, prospective child actors for the roles of Young Simba and Young Nala participate in a ten week "Cub Academy."

In March 2012, a few South African cast members were invited to perform at the Diamond Jubilee Pageant.

Due to the COVID-19 pandemic in the United Kingdom mandating the closure of all theatres, the production was forced to take a lengthy hiatus and its return at the London Lyceum Theatre was announced for July 29, 2021.

There have also been two English tours, visiting places all through the United Kingdom, going as far as Ireland. The first one, named "The Zebra Tour", ran from September 6, 2012, to February 22, 2015, with stops in Bristol, Manchester, Dublin, Birmingham, Edinburgh, Plymouth, Bradford, Liverpool, Southampton, Sunderland and Cardiff. The second, the "Rhino Tour", started on July 9, 2019, and finished on November 11, 2023, after visiting Cardiff, Bristol, Edinburgh, Bradford, Manchester, Southampton, Sunderland, Birmingham, and Dublin.

==== Other countries ====
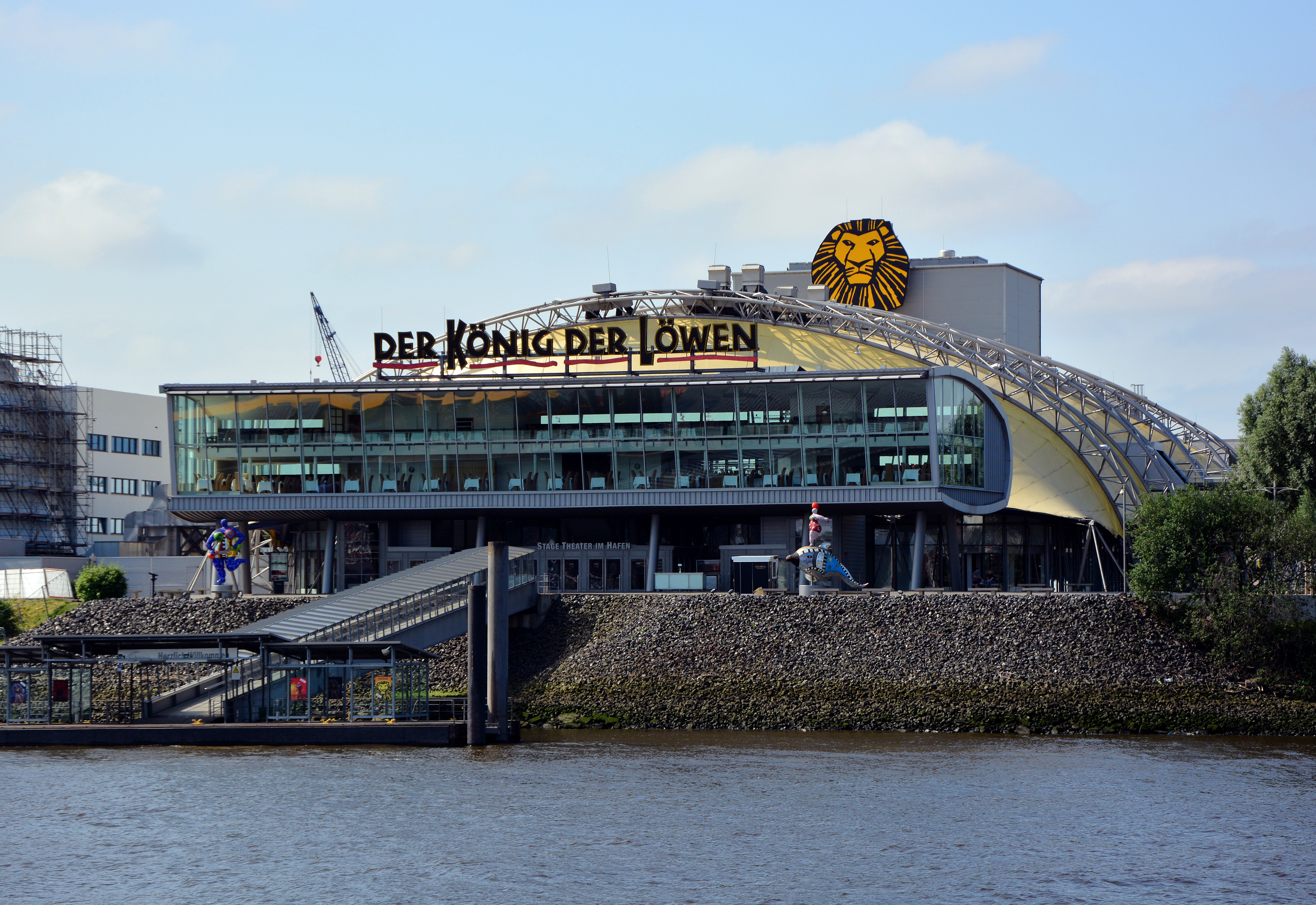
Hamburg, Germany: Theater im Hafen (since 2001), accessible by boat

The German production has been playing in Hamburg at the Theater im Hafen since December 2, 2001, and had its 5,000th performance on January 14, 2014. Access to the theater is by ferry, where the boats are decorated in the colors of the musical and are named after characters in the musical (such as Nala and its sister ship Rafiki). By September 2014, the Hamburg production had passed the $1 billion in cumulative gross. For the German production, there is a "Lion School" training program to select up to ten child actors each to play young Simba and Nala, who only perform once or twice a week due to child labor laws and generally don't stay at the theater for the curtain call except for their first and last performances.

A Dutch production was produced by Joop van den Ende Theaterproducties/Stage Entertainment and played at the Circustheater in Scheveningen, The Hague, running from April 4, 2004, until August 27, 2006, when it was replaced by another Disney musical, Tarzan. A Dutch revival ran for 1,139 performances at the same Circustheater from October 30, 2016, to July 21, 2019.

A French production debuted in Paris on September 22, 2007, at the Théâtre Mogador. This production won several Molière Awards and closed on July 25, 2010, after being watched by over a million people. A French revival opened at the same Théâtre Mogador on November 11, 2021.

On October 20, 2011, the first Spanish production premiered at the Teatro Lope de Vega in Madrid, where it is still running after more than 5,500 performances.

In Basel, Switzerland, the musical was performed for the first time from March 12, 2015, until October 11, 2015.

=== Africa ===
Beginning in June 2007, The Lion King debuted its first-ever performance on the African continent in Johannesburg, South Africa at the Teatro at Montecasino. The Lion King was the first production to take place in the new theatre. The cast featured 53 artists, of whom all were South African. The opening night in Johannesburg was celebrated with key persons involving the creation of the musical and American talk show host Oprah Winfrey who had recently opened an educational academy for girls in Johannesburg. The show closed on February 17, 2008.

=== Asia ===
==== Japan ====
The show was translated into Japanese and staged by the Shiki Theatre Company. The Tokyo production began in 1998 and continues to the present day at the Shiki Theatre HARU. The production achieved its 10,000th performance on July 15, 2015.

It is the second longest-running musical production in Japan, running only behind the musical Cats, selling 10.26 million tickets as of March 2016.

==== Other countries ====
The musical had a Korean production from October 28, 2006, to October 28, 2007, at the Charlotte Theater in Seoul, where it ran for 330 performances.

In August 2008, a production opened in Taipei, Taiwan, closing on August 24, 2009.

The show had a limited run at Shanghai's Grand Theatre from July to September 2006. This production was led by Buyi Zama and was performed in English, though a couple of Chinese elements were added to the story. From June 14, 2016, until October 8, 2017, The Lion King returned to China, in a new production that was staged at the 1,200 capacity Walt Disney Grand Theatre, in the Shanghai Disney Resort, where it ran for 500 performances. This production was performed in Mandarin and led by Ntsepa Pitjeng.

During the show's run in China, Chinese elements were included in the musical. One of the songs was adapted to a well-known Chinese pop song, "Laoshu ai dami" or "Mice Love Rice".

=== Australia ===
The show played at the Capitol Theatre in Sydney, Australia, from October 16, 2003, until June 26, 2005. The production then ran at the Regent Theatre in Melbourne from July 28, 2005, until June 4, 2006. Since then, two additional Australian productions have been staged, one running from 2013 to 2016 and another from 2026 onward.

=== International tour ===
On March 28, 2018, the first international tour officially opened at the Solaire Resort & Casino in Manila, with stops in Singapore, South Korea (Daegu, Seoul, and Busan), Taipei, Bangkok, Hong Kong, Auckland, and Abu Dhabi. All these countries have had productions so far, except the Philippines, Hong Kong, Thailand, New Zealand and United Arab Emirates. The tour is performed in English, with subtitles in each country's official language projected in the screen, with alterations in the script to make references to local culture.

As a result of the 2019-20 coronavirus outbreak and subsequent evacuation of the city, the show's originally planned March 2020 Chinese run, which would have taken place in both Wuhan and Beijing, was ultimately cancelled, with performances to be rescheduled. A return to South Africa was also postponed indefinitely.

After more than a year with the production on hiatus, it was announced on March 15, 2021, that the show would return for a special season in New Zealand by June 2021, marking the first time ever the country received a production of it. It will be the first production to return performing - all others have been closed since March 2020. The announcement of this engagement was met with controversy due to New Zealand's response to the pandemics and the fact that most cast and crew members were either immigrants or not considered essential workers, while the native New Zealanders have been struggling to get back on their feet due to economic effects of COVID.

On June 20, 2022, it was announced the show would go to the Middle East for the first time, with a limited engagement to take place from November 16 until December 10 at Abu Dhabi's Etihad Arena.

== Characters ==
- Simba: a male lion who is next in line to become king, son of Mufasa. Voice type: tenor
  - Young Simba: Voice type: boy soprano
- Nala: a lioness who later becomes Simba's love interest. Voice type: alto
  - Young Nala: Voice type: soprano
- Scar: a male lion, Simba's uncle and Mufasa's brother; he kills Mufasa in order to become king. Voice type: baritone
- Rafiki: a female mandrill who serves as narrator. Voice type: mezzo-soprano
- Mufasa: a male, king of the Pridelands; Simba's father and Sarabi's husband. Voice type: bass
- Timon: a male meerkat who becomes a friend with Simba. Voice type: tenor
- Pumbaa: a male warthog who also becomes a friend with Simba. Voice type: baritone
- Zazu: a male hornbill, Mufasa's majordomo. Voice type: tenor
- Shenzi: a female hyena; one of Scar's minions. Voice type: alto
- Banzai: a male hyena; one of Scar's minions. Voice type: tenor
- Ed: a male hyena who cannot speak; one of Scar's minions. Voice type: any male voice type
- Sarabi: a lioness, Simba's mother and Mufasa's wife. voice type: any female voice type
- The ensemble consists of a variety of African animals, Scar's hyenas, and plants

== Original casts ==
The original principal casts of all major productions.

Character	Broadway	West End	Gazelle Tour (1st U.S. Tour)	Cheetah Tour (2nd U.S. Tour)	Rafiki Tour (3rd U.S. Tour)
Character	1997	1999	2002	2003	2017
Scar	John Vickery	Rob Edwards	Patrick Page	Larry Yando	Mark Campbell
Rafiki	Tsidii Le Loka	Josette Bushell-Mingo	Fredi Walker-Browne	Thandazile A. Soni	Buyi Zama
Mufasa	Samuel E. Wright	Cornell John	Alton Fitzgerald White	Rufus Bonds Jr.	Gerald Ramsey
Young Simba	Scott Irby-Ranniar	Daniel Anthony Ross Coates Luke Youngblood	Akil I. Lugman Christopher Warren Jr.	Khaleel Mandel Carter	Joziyah Jean-Felix Ramon Reed
Young Nala	Kajuana Shuford	Pippa Bennett-Warner Nathalie Emmanuel Dominique Moore	Paula Collins Cajai Fellows Johnson		Gloria Manning Danielle W. Jalade
Simba	Jason Raize	Roger Wright	Josh Tower	Brandon Victor Dixon	Gerald Caesar
Nala	Heather Headley	Paulette Ivory	Kissy Simmons	Adia Ginneh	Nia Holloway
Timon	Max Casella	Simon Gregor	John Plumpis	Benjamin Clost	Nick Cordileone
Pumbaa	Tom Alan Robbins	Martyn Ellis	Blake Hammond	Bob Amaral	Ben Lipitz
Zazu	Geoff Hoyle	Gregory Gudgeon	Jeffrey Binder	Derek Hasenstab	Greg Jackson
Shenzi	Tracy Nicole Chapman	Stephanie Charles	Jacquelyn Hodges	Shaullanda LaCombe	Martina Sykes
Banzai	Stanley Wayne Mathis	Paul J. Medford	James Brown-Orleans	Melvin Abston	Keith Bennett
Ed	Kevin Cahoon	Christopher Holt	Wayne Pile	Brian Sills	Robbie Swift
Sarabi	Gina Breedlove	Dawn Michael	Jean Michelle Grier		Kimber Sprawl

The original production crew for the Broadway production:

Title	Original Broadway Production Crew
Director	Julie Taymor
Choreographer	Garth Fagan
Musical Director	Joseph Church
Scenic Design	Richard Hudson
Costume Design	Julie Taymor
Lighting Design	Donald Holder
Mask Design	Julie Taymor & Michael Curry
Puppet Design	Julie Taymor & Michael Curry
Sound Design	Tony Meola
Hair Design	Michael Ward
Make-up Design	Michael Ward
Projection Design	Geoff Puckett
Associate Scenic Design	Peter Eastman & Jonathan Fensom
Associate Costume Design	Mary Nemecek Peterson
Associate Lighting Design	Jeanne Koenig

== Cast distinctions ==
- Phindile Mkhize, Zama Magudulela, and Ntsepa Ptjeng are the only actresses who performed as leads in the three languages the musical has been performed in. Phindile performed in English (American tour and Las Vegas, 2002–2010), Spanish (Madrid, 2012) and Portuguese (São Paulo, 2013); while Ntsepa was leading in São Paulo (2014, as a substitute to Phindile), Basel (2015) and Shanghai (2016). Zama in French, (Paris, 2007–2010), Spanish (Madrid, 2011–2019) and Portuguese (São Paulo, 2023–2024)
- Zama Magudulela, is also the sole actress ever to perform in five companies, as she was in the first Australian tour (2003–2006), German (2006), French (2007–2010), Spanish (2011–2019) and Brazilian (2023–2024) productions.
- Portia Manyike is the only actress to perform in three languages, though she was never promoted to leading cast member. She's been part of the ensemble in France, Brazil and Mexico.
- Nteliseng Nkhela (German and English), Nomvula Dlamini (English and Dutch), Ntsepa Pitjeng (English, Portuguese, Mandarin and French), Thabile Mtshali (English and Portuguese), Mukelisiwe Goba (English and Spanish) and Brown Lindiwe Mkhize (English and Spanish) are the only actresses who performed as leading Rafikis in productions in two languages.
- John Vickery was the first actor to move from Broadway into a different production of the show, when he chose to leave Broadway in 1999 to move to the Los Angeles production in 2000.
- Sheila Gibbs was the first actress to move from a standby into a leading role. She was a Rafiki understudy for Tsidi Le Loka from 1997 to 1998 and was selected as leading from 2001 to 2002. This was followed by Gugwana Dlamini, who was a standby (1999–2002) and a leading (2002–2005) in the show's London production and Buyisile Zama, who was a standby for Gugwana in London (2002–2003) and leading actress for the show's first Australian tour (2003–2006).
- Nomvula Dlamini was the first, and so far the only, actress who moved from Broadway into a production performed in a different language, being the leading Rafiki on Broadway (2002–2004) and Holland (2004–2006).
- Spanish actors Esteban Oliver and Mukelisiwe Goba were the first actors who moved from Spain into Broadway, when they respectively took over the role of Zazu and Rafiki understudy in 2014 for a couple of months. Mukelisiwe then was transferred to the Gazelle Tour, taking over Tshidi Manye in September 2015.
- Having been in the show since its 1997 premiere, actress Lindiwe Dlamini is the actress who's been for more time in the show. She's followed by Joachim Benoit, who's been regularly performing as Zazu since the show premiered in Germany, in 2001.
- Melina M'Poy was the first actress to perform as the two leading lionesses. She was Sarabi (France, 2007–2010) and Nala (Basel, London, UK tour and Singapore, 2011–2015).
- The Londoner production is known to have been the first to have selected non-African actresses to perform as Rafiki, since actresses Josette Bushell-Mingo (1999–2001) and Sharon D. Clarke (2001–2003) are English, though their understudies were South African. The American tour companies followed this when Fredi Walker and Fuchsia Walker were chosen as Rafiki in 2001 as leadings for the first American tour and the Los Angeles one, respectively.
- The Japanese and Korean productions also stand out since never throughout them the productions had leading African actresses. Native Japanese and Korean actresses performed as Rafiki during the productions.
- Buyi Zama (2002–2016), Zama Magudulela (2002 up to the present day), Brown Lindiwe Mkhize (starting in 2005), Futhi Mhlongo (2000–2004; 2010–2018), Tshidi Manye (2000 up to the present day), Gugwana Dlamini (2002– up to present day), Thandazile A. Soni (2002–2010; 2012 up to the present day), and Mpume Sikakane (2002 up to the present day) are the actresses who've been performing as either leading or stand-bys to Rafiki for the longest time, having performed in several productions.
- Alton Fitzgerald White (2002–2015), Nathaniel Stampley (2006–2010), and David Comrie (leading in the Spanish production from 2011 to 2017) performed as Mufasa for longer than any other actor. Behind them comes Jean-Luc Guizonne, who performed in Paris, Singapore and German (from 2007 to 2014).
- On several occasions, members from different productions agreed to change places. That happened twice: when Patrick Brown (American tour) and Gareth Saxe (Broadway) changed places as leading Scar in 2014–2015; Buyi Zama (American tour) changed places with Tshidi Manye (Broadway) as Rafiki in 2013–2014 and when Brown Lindiwe Mkhize (London) changed places with Nteliseng Nkhela (American tour) again as Rafiki in 2013. More recently, Tryphena Wade and Chondra Profit agreed to change places from the North American tour to Broadway.
- When actress Shirley Hlahatse was chosen as the leading Rafiki in the Mexican production of the show, it marked the first time in years an actress who had never been in the show before was given the role. In most occasions, understudies or standbys were promoted to leading.
- South African dancer Keswa was 18 years old when she arrived on Broadway in 1999. She was the youngest performer ever to be given a role in the show's ensemble group.
- Balungile Gumede and Marvette Williams are the actresses who have played Sarabi for the longest timespan in the show. Balungile as of February 2018 is a cover Sarabi, however she started in the German production of the show in 2010 taking over Marvette playing Sarabi until 2017 when she was replaced by Kerry Jean. They are followed by Tryphena Wade, who's also performing as the lioness since 2010.
- Enrique Segura is the actor who played Ed for the longest timespan in the show, being on it for more than a decade.
- Segura is followed by Bonita J. Hamilton and James Brown-Orleans, who have been performing as hyenas Shenzi and Banzai for more than 5 years.
- Nokubonga Khuzwayo has been performing as Nala for the longest timespan in the show. She's performed in South Africa (2007–2008), Taiwan (2008), Las Vegas (2010–2011), American tour (2011) and Germany (2012–2017).
- Lebo M, Tsidii LeLoka, Willi Welp and Gustavo Vaz were the only actors who were performers and directors of the show. Lebo M was the composer of various of the show's songs and performed on Broadway (1997–2000), Willi Welp performed as Scar from 2005 to 2015 and then left to be the resident director of the show's German production and Gustavo was the resident director of the show's Brazilian production at the same time he was a Scar and Pumbaa standby. Original Broadway Rafiki Tsidi LeLoka was also part of the show's creative team, as she's the one responsible for adding Rafiki's chants to the story and writing her mourning song.
- After more than 2000 performances in 8 years, Agustin Arguello turned into the actor who performed as a leading Simba for the longest time in the show worldwide, doing more than 700 shows in México and more than 1500 shows in Spain.
- Carlos Rivera is the sole leading cast member whose voice can be heard in two different recordings. He plays Simba in the Spanish (2011) and Mexican (2015) cast albums.
- While it's a rule for all the productions of the show to have at least 6 South African performers in their casts, the South African one had a cast fully made of native actors.
- Nosipho Nkonqa is the cast member who's been in more productions than any other. She was in the Holland (2004–2006), South African (2007–2008), Taiwan (2008), Singapore (2011), United Kingdom tour (2012–2015), Basel (2015) and London (2016 up to the present time) productions.
- Andile Gumbi is the actor who performed as Simba for the longest time in the show. He was in the original Australian tour (2003–2006), Shanghai (2006), Johannesburg (2007–2008), London (2009–2012) and Broadway (2012–2013). He is followed by Jonathan Andrew Hume, who performed as a standby (2001–2011) and as a full-time cast member (2011–2016) for the role.
- Vusi Sondyazi is one of the actors who've been on the show for the longest time. He's been serving as an ensemble singer and Mufasa understudy since 2003 and stays in the Gazelle Tour cast at the present, after having performed on Broadway, Taipei and Las Vegas as well.
- Ntomb'Khona Dlamini is the actress who served as an understudy or ensemble member for the longest time. She was in the original Broadway company as an understudy to Tsidi LeLoka. After leaving for a brief time between 2000 and 2001, she went on to perform in the American tours. Summing up all this time, she's been in the show for more than 15 years, finally leaving the company in 2013.
- Gaia Aikman will be the first actress ever to perform as both Young and Adult Nala. She was one of the children assigned for that role in the original Dutch production (2004–2006) and was selected as the leading for the adult version of the same character in the Dutch revival production (2016–2017). Other notable young actors and actress' who have gone on to be a part of the Adult Ensemble include: Lauren Alexandra Young Nala (London 2000) Ensemble Cover Nala (London 2013–2014), André Fabien Francis Young Simba (London 2004) Ensemble (Germany 2015–2018), Jermaine Woods Young Simba (London 2005) Ensemble Cover Ed (UK Tour 2014–2015).

== Recordings ==
Most of the show's international productions had cast recordings which are available on CD, including:

- 1997 Broadway Cast
  - The original Broadway cast recording is the only cast recording of the musical that comes with the song "The Lion Sleeps Tonight". It's also the only cast recording that does not come with the full reprise of "Circle of Life", the last four verses of that song being added to the CD.
- 1999 Japanese Cast
  - The Japanese cast recording was re-released in 2011 with four extra karaoke tracks and new renditions of the songs using the instrumental tracks of the 1999 CD. (Walt Disney Records, ASIN: B0058X1C3S)
- 2002 German Cast
  - At sometime after the show's German debut, alternate versions of the songs "Der ewige kreis", "Endlose Nacht", "Er lebt in dir" and "Kann es wirklich liebe sein" (German versions of "Circle of Life", "Endless Night", "He Lives in You" and "Can You Feel The Love Tonight?") were released.
- 2004 Dutch Cast
  - The 2016 Dutch revival production had a newly live recorded cast album with different instrumental tracks for the songs.
- 2007 French Cast
  - Some time during the promotion of the French promotion, a CD-single containing a medley of the songs "Ils Vivent en Toi" and "Il Vit en Toi" (French versions of "They Live in You" and "He Lives in You") was released, with a music video being recorded with actors Zama Magudulela (Rafiki), Jeremy Fontanet (Adult Simba) and Jean-Luc Guizonne (Mufasa) performing and singing the song with natives chanting in the background. This new version of the songs were also included in a special, double edition of the French cast recording that also came with a bonus DVD.
- 2007 South African Cast (live performance audio CD)
  - The song "Rafiki Mourns" was cut from this CD, while every other song was included in their complete form. The CD also comes with a remix of the song "One by One" performed by the cast.
- 2011 Spanish Cast
  - The Spanish CD already comes with the cuts made to the Broadway production in 2010. The song "The Morning Report" was totally cut, with some minutes of "Can You Feel The Love Tonight" and "The Madness of King Scar". It is also the only non-English CD where "One by One" was renamed due to the language (in Spanish, it became "Somos mil"), though the song is performed with its original lyrics.
- 2015 Mexican Cast
  - In this release, the Mexican Spanish versions of Simba Confronts Scar and Circle of Life (Reprise) were comprised into a single song, this version being named Confrontación/Finale. It also includes the song which Timon sings to fool the hyenas, which was recorded in the studio and added to the cast album.
  - With the release of the Mexican cast recording, Spanish was the first language in which the musical was performed that spawned two different cast recordings. Mexican Spanish lyrics were translated by Aleks Syntek and Armando Manzanero.
- Note: A recording entitled The Lion King, by the London Theatre Orchestra and Singers, was released on November 14, 2000 (D-3 Entertainment, ASIN: B00004ZDR6). This is not the London original cast recording.

Of all the show's productions (counting the English ones), only the Brazilian and the Korean ones didn't have cast recordings released.

=== The Lion King: Original Broadway Cast Recording ===
The Lion King: Original Broadway Cast Recording is a cast recording released on 1997 by The Walt Disney Company, a recording of the songs as heard in the stage musical. Most of the tracks were composed by African composer Lebo M and focused primarily on the African influences of the film's original music, with most songs being sung either partially or entirely in various African languages. The album was certified platinum by the RIAA on January 17, 2007.

Rafiki's chants in "Rafiki Mourns" were written by Tsidii Le Loka, who originated the role on Broadway.

1. "Circle of Life" – Faca Kulu, Lebo M, The Lion King Ensemble and Tsidii Le Loka
2. "Grasslands Chant" – The Lion King Ensemble
3. "The Morning Report" – Geoff Hoyle, Samuel E. Wright and Scott Irby-Ranniar
4. "The Lioness Hunt" – Lebo M and The Lion King Ensemble
5. "I Just Can't Wait to Be King" – Geoff Hoyle, Kajuana Shuford, Scott Irby-Ranniar and The Lion King Ensemble
6. "Chow Down" – Kevin Cahoon, Stanley Wayne Mathis and Tracy Nicole Chapman
7. "They Live in You" – Samuel E. Wright and The Lion King Ensemble
8. "Be Prepared" – John Vickery, Kevin Cahoon, Stanley Wayne Mathis, The Lion King Ensemble and Tracy Nicole Chapman
9. "The Stampede" – The Lion King Ensemble
10. "Rafiki Mourns" – The Lion King Ensemble and Tsidii Le Loka
11. "Hakuna Matata" – Jason Raize, Max Casella, Scott Irby-Ranniar, The Lion King Ensemble and Tom Alan Robbins
12. "One by One" – Lebo M and The Lion King Ensemble
13. "The Madness of King Scar" – Geoff Hoyle, Heather Headley, John Vickery, Kevin Cahoon, Stanley Wayne Mathis and Tracy Nicole Chapman
14. "Shadowland" – Heather Headley, The Lion King Ensemble and Tsidii Le Loka
15. "The Lion Sleeps Tonight" – Lebo M
16. "Endless Night" – Jason Raize and The Lion King Ensemble
17. "Can You Feel the Love Tonight" – Heather Headley, Jason Raize, Max Casella, The Lion King Ensemble and Tom Alan Robbins
18. "He Lives in You (Reprise)" – Jason Raize, The Lion King Ensemble and Tsidii Le Loka
19. "Simba Confronts Scar" – Mark Mancina and Robert Elhai
20. "King of Pride Rock/Circle of Life (Reprise)" – Geoff Hoyle, Heather Headley, Jason Raize, Lebo M, Max Casella, The Lion King Ensemble, Tom Alan Robbins and Tsidii Le Loka
- Note: The songs "Grasslands Chant", "The Lioness Hunt", "Chow Down", "They Live in You", "Rafiki Mourns", "One by One", "The Madness of King Scar", "Shadowland", "Endless Night" and "Simba Confronts Scar" are new songs written for the musical.

==== Instrumentation ====
Robert Elhai, David Metzger and Bruce Fowler orchestrated the original Broadway production for 23 players, including: 1 wood flute soloist/flute/piccolo, 1 concertmistress, 2 violin, 1 violin/viola, 2 celli, 1 flute/clarinet/bass clarinet, 3 French horns, 1 trombone, 1 bass trombone/tuba, 1 bass player (playing both contrabass and electric bass), 1 drum player, 1 guitar, 2 mallets/percussion players, 2 percussion players (both of them at the sides of the stage) and 3 keyboard synthesizers.

David Metzger reduced the orchestration to 17 players for the West End premiere of the show; integrating 2 of the French Horns, a cello, a violin, the clarinets, and one of the mallet players into the keyboard parts.

Most of the current productions employ a smaller ensemble of 10 musicians (flutes, French horn, 2 keyboards, bass, guitar, drums, marimba, 2 percussionists), and fill out the rest with the electronic music system KeyComp.

== Awards and nominations ==
=== Original Broadway production ===
Year	Award Ceremony	Category	Nominee	Result
1998	Tony Awards	Best Musical		Won
1998	Tony Awards	Best Book of a Musical	Roger Allers and Irene Mecchi	Nominated
1998	Tony Awards	Best Original Score	Elton John, Tim Rice, Hans Zimmer, Lebo M, Mark Mancina, Jay Rifkin and Julie Taymor	Nominated
1998	Tony Awards	Best Performance by a Featured Actor in a Musical	Samuel E. Wright	Nominated
1998	Tony Awards	Best Performance by a Featured Actress in a Musical	Tsidii Le Loka	Nominated
1998	Tony Awards	Best Direction of a Musical	Julie Taymor	Won
1998	Tony Awards	Best Choreography	Garth Fagan	Won
1998	Tony Awards	Best Orchestrations	Robert Elhai, David Metzger and Bruce Fowler	Nominated
1998	Tony Awards	Best Scenic Design	Richard Hudson	Won
1998	Tony Awards	Best Costume Design	Julie Taymor	Won
1998	Tony Awards	Best Lighting Design	Donald Holder	Won
1998	Drama Desk Awards	Outstanding Musical		Nominated
1998	Drama Desk Awards	Outstanding Featured Actor in a Musical	Max Casella	Nominated
1998	Drama Desk Awards	Outstanding Featured Actor in a Musical	Geoff Hoyle	Nominated
1998	Drama Desk Awards	Outstanding Featured Actress in a Musical	Tsidii Le Loka	Won
1998	Drama Desk Awards	Outstanding Director	Julie Taymor	Won
1998	Drama Desk Awards	Outstanding Choreography	Garth Fagan	Won
1998	Drama Desk Awards	Outstanding Orchestrations	Robert Elhai, David Metzger, and Bruce Fowler	Nominated
1998	Drama Desk Awards	Outstanding Set Design	Richard Hudson	Won
1998	Drama Desk Awards	Outstanding Costume Design	Julie Taymor	Won
1998	Drama Desk Awards	Outstanding Lighting Design	Donald Holder	Won
1998	Drama Desk Awards	Outstanding Sound Design	Tony Meola	Won
1998	Drama Desk Awards	Outstanding Puppet Design	Julie Taymor and Michael Curry	Won
1998	Theatre World Awards		Max Casella	Won
1998	New York Drama Critics' Circle Awards	Best Musical		Won

=== Original London production ===
Year	Award Ceremony	Category	Nominee	Result
1999	Laurence Olivier Awards	Best New Musical		Nominated
1999	Laurence Olivier Awards	Best Actor in a Musical	Rob Edwards	Nominated
1999	Laurence Olivier Awards	Best Actress in a Musical	Josette Bushell-Mingo	Nominated
1999	Laurence Olivier Awards	Best Director	Julie Taymor	Nominated
1999	Laurence Olivier Awards	Best Theatre Choreographer	Garth Fagan	Won
1999	Laurence Olivier Awards	Best Set Design	Richard Hudson	Nominated
1999	Laurence Olivier Awards	Best Costume Design	Julie Taymor	Won
1999	Laurence Olivier Awards	Best Lighting Design	Donald Holder	Nominated

=== Original French production ===
Year	Award Ceremony	Category	Nominee	Result
2008	Molière Awards	Best Musical		Won
2008	Molière Awards	Best Costume Design	Julie Taymor	Won
2008	Molière Awards	Best Lighting Design	Donald Holder	Won

=== Original Australian production ===
Year	Award Ceremony	Category	Nominee	Result
2004	Helpmann Awards	Best Musical		Won
2004	Helpmann Awards	Best Direction of a Musical	Julie Taymor	Won
2004	Helpmann Awards	Best Choreography in a Musical	Garth Fagan	Won
2004	Helpmann Awards	Best Female Actor in a Musical	Buyisile Zama	Nominated
2004	Helpmann Awards	Best Male Actor in a Musical	Tony Harvey	Nominated
2004	Helpmann Awards	Best Female Actor in a Supporting Role in a Musical	Cherine Peck	Nominated
2004	Helpmann Awards	Best Male Actor in a Supporting Role in a Musical	Terry Bader	Nominated
2004	Helpmann Awards	Best Original Score	Tim Rice, Elton John, Lebo M, Hans Zimmer, Julie Taymor, Mark Mancina & Jay Rifkin	Nominated
2004	Helpmann Awards	Best Costume Design	Julie Taymor	Won
2004	Helpmann Awards	Best Lighting Design	Donald Holder	Nominated
2004	Helpmann Awards	Best Sound Design	Steve Kennedy	Nominated
