= Daniel Kramer =

American-born theatre, opera and dance director

Daniel Kramer (born January 15, 1977) is an American-born theatre, opera and dance director. He was appointed artistic director of the English National Opera in April 2016.

== Early life and education ==
Kramer was born on a sheep farm in Wadsworth, Ohio, US. He graduated salutatorian from Wadsworth High School. At Northwestern University, he earned a BGS in Interdisciplinary Arts: Theatre, Performance Studies and Dance with a Music Theatre Certificate, graduating Summa cum laude. He then pursued three years of practical graduate studies at the Ecole de Mime Corporel Dramatique (the technique of Étienne Decroux) in London; commedia dell'arte with Maestro Antonia Fava in Italy; and finally at London's Circus Space, now the National Centre for Circus Arts.

== Career ==
Kramer has had a prolific directing career with a variety of stage and opera companies. His work is known for its striking visuals and emotional intensity. He began his professional career with Franz Xaver Kroetz's Through the Leaves, starring Ann Mitchell and Simon Callow, at Southwark Playhouse: the production was transferred to the West End. He next reimagined Büchner's Woyzeck and the anti-war musical Hair for the Gate Theatre, Notting Hill. Both shows garnered his first award nominations.

Between 2004 and 2006 he was Associate Artistic Director of the Gate Theatre; between 2005 and 2006 he was Creative Associate at the Royal Shakespeare Company; between 2008 and 2012 he was an Associate at the Young Vic. During this time, he was noted as a "directing talent worth reckoning with". His commercial debut was Martin Sherman's Bent, starring Alan Cumming and newcomer Chris New, followed by the UK's first national revival of Tony Kushner's Angels in America for Headlong Theatre.

In 2008 Kramer directed his first opera, Harrison Birtwistle's Punch & Judy for the English National Opera at the Young Vic which subsequently played the Grand Théâtre de Genève. His popular but controversial Bluebeard's Castle for the English National Opera was conducted by Valery Gergiev for the Mariinsky Theatre and Bolshoi Theatre. Kramer and Gergiev subsequently collaborated on Pelleas and Melisande.

His first dance collaboration, Mussorgsky's Pictures from an Exhibition, played at the Young Vic and Sadlers Wells. His radical rethink of Carmen – set in Seville, Ohio – played at Opera North and Vlaamse Opera. Kramer created the award-winning production of King Kong in Melbourne, Australia starring Esther Hannaford. His Tristan and Isolde for the ENO, designed by Anish Kapoor, premiered during the 2015/2016 opera season. His Magic Flute at the Grand Théâtre de Genève was cancelled by the director of the Grand Théâtre owing to the artistic angle taken by Kramer, who wanted to focus on the violence present in the opera, whereas the director wanted a more festive and traditional approach.

He was appointed artistic director of the English National Opera in April 2016.

Kramer has also been a guest artist and professor at Harvard University, Brown University, New York University, Northwestern University in Illinois and the Guildhall School of Music and Drama in London.

== Awards and nominations ==
Kramer was the winner of the South Bank Show Award for Outstanding Achievement in Opera for the ENO at the Young Vic season 2008, and was nominated for the Golden Mask award for Best Director for Bluebeard, at the Bolshoi Theatre, Moscow.

== Personal life ==
Kramer has been in relationships with the actor Simon Callow and with fashion designer Jurgen Oeltjenbruns.
