= Helpsters =

American educational children's television series

- Genre: Children's television; Education; Musical; Comedy
- Created by: Tim McKeon
- Written by: Tim McKeon
- Starring: Stephanie D'Abruzzo; Ingrid Hansen; Jennifer Barnhart; Tim Lagasse; Martin P. Robinson
- Opening theme: "How Can We Help You?"
- Ending theme: "How Can We Help You?"
- Composer: Paul Buckley
- Country of origin: United States
- Original language: English
- No. of seasons: 3
- No. of episodes: 40

Production
- Executive producers: Tim McKeon; Kay Wilson Stallings; Benjamin Lehmann; Adam Peltzman
- Production locations: New York City, New York
- Running time: 22-28 minutes
- Production companies: Sesame Workshop; Big Indie Pictures; Monkey Boys Productions

Original release
- Network: Apple TV+
- Release: November 1, 2019 – January 6, 2023

Helpsters is an American educational children's television series created by Tim McKeon and produced by Sesame Workshop and Big Indie Pictures as an original series for Apple TV+, and premiered on November 1, 2019, coinciding with the launch of the service. A spin-off short series, titled Helpsters Help You, was released on April 24, 2020, in order to provide children with supportive content during the COVID-19 pandemic.

The show was announced at Apple's "It's Showtime" presentation on March 25, 2019, by Sesame Street's Big Bird and series protagonist Cody.

In March 2021, Apple renewed Helpsters for a third season which premiered on May 27, 2022.

== Premise ==
A group of monsters known as the Helpsters work together to help solve the problems of customers who enter their shop through teamwork and problem solving. The series aims to teach children important skills for planning and following directions for the challenges they face, as well as introducing them to basic concepts in coding.

== Cast and characters ==
=== Main ===
- Stephanie D'Abruzzo as Cody – Cody is the enthusiastic leader of the Helpsters whose positive attitude never fails to rally everyone to action.
- Martin P. Robinson as Mr. Primm – Mr. Primm is the most sophisticated member of the Helpsters with a secret wild streak. Always willing to help, Mr. Primm gets hung up on doing things the correct way.
- Tim Lagasse as Scatter – Scatter is the youngest and most innocent member of the Helpsters. He can be scatterbrained at times, but also comes up with ideas by thinking outside the box.
- Ingrid Hansen as Heart – Heart is the Helpster with the biggest heart. Be careful which instructions you give Heart, because Heart will do exactly what you say.
- Jennifer Barnhart as Jackie – Jackie is the Helpsters’ closest friend who appears whenever they need an extra hand. She speaks in monster mumbles that only the Helpsters can understand.

The series features puppet characters designed and built by Monkey Boys Productions.

== Episodes ==
Season	Episodes	Originally released	
Season	Episodes	First released	Last released
1	13	November 1, 2019	April 3, 2020
2	13	October 16, 2020	March 5, 2021
3	14	May 27, 2022	January 6, 2023

=== Season 1 (2019–20) ===
No. overall	No. in season	Title	Directed by	Written by	Original release date
1	1	"Amazing Alie / Robbie & Rhonda Runner"	Ben Lehmann	Tim McKeon	November 1, 2019
2	2	"Dancer Dave / Astronaut Amrita"	Benjamin Lehmann	Nick Confalone	November 1, 2019
3	3	"Singing Starlett / Heart's Family Photo"	Matt Vogel	Alex Fox & Rachel Lewis	November 1, 2019
4	4	"Rita Reader / Cody Gets a Cold"	Shannon Flynn	Liz Hara	November 1, 2019
5	5	"Musical Mabels / Barbara Birdwatcher"	Shannon Flynn	Annabeth Bondor-Stone & Connor White	November 1, 2019
6	6	"Wayne of Wonder / Paleontologist Paloma"	Ryan McFaul	Alex Fox & Rachel Lewis	November 1, 2019
7	7	"Scatter / Sid Square"	Unknown	Eva Konstantopoulos	April 3, 2020
8	8	"Frank the Flyer / Neighbor Nora"	Melanie Orr	Unknown	April 3, 2020
9	9	"Isaac Ice / Air Conditioning Repairman Aaron"	Unknown	Alex Fox & Rachel Lewis	April 3, 2020
10	10	"Chef Charlie / Fashion Fil"	Unknown	Nick Confalone & Tim McKeon	April 3, 2020
11	11	"Basketball Brianna / Heart’s Fish"	Unknown	Alex Fox & Rachel Lewis	April 3, 2020
12	12	"Nurse Nina & Farmer Flynn / Firefighter Fran & Painter Pat"	Unknown	Unknown	April 3, 2020
13	13	"Primmflandia Day / Marching Band Marsha"	Unknown	Annabeth Bondor-Stone & Connor White	April 3, 2020

=== Helpsters Help You (2020) ===
No.	Title	Directed by	Written by	Original release date
1	"When Plans Change"	Unknown	Unknown	April 24, 2020
2	"Honorary Helpster"	Unknown	Unknown	May 1, 2020
3	"Scavenger Hunt"	Unknown	Unknown	May 8, 2020
4	"Bright Smiles & Hand Waves"	Unknown	Unknown	May 15, 2020
5	"How to Be Together"	Unknown	Unknown	May 22, 2020
6	"Thank You"	Unknown	Unknown	May 29, 2020

=== Season 2 (2020–21) ===
No. overall	No. in season	Title	Directed by	Written by	Original release date
14	1	"Amazing Atticus / Sea Lovin' Sam"	Unknown	Unknown	October 16, 2020
15	2	"Ballerina Betsy / Pizza Pasquale"	Shannon Flynn & Sean Mulcahy	Alex Fox & Rachel Lewis	October 16, 2020
16	3	"Mini-Golf Mike / Helpsters Need Help"	Tim McKeon	Alex Fox & Rachel Lewis	October 16, 2020
17	4	"Helpsters Halloween / Storyteller Sophia"	Unknown	Unknown	October 16, 2020
18	5	"Billy Bug / Cody Rides a Bike"	Unknown	Unknown	October 16, 2020
19	6	"Mr. Primm’s Spoon Club / Cookie Cornelius"	Tim McKeon & Shannon Flynn	Unknown	October 16, 2020
20	7	"Camper Cortez / Artist Andrew & Detective Dudley"	Unknown	Alex Fox & Rachel Lewis	October 16, 2020
21	8	"Helpsters Help Heart / Callie the Clown"	Unknown	Unknown	March 5, 2021
22	9	"Park Ranger Percy / Lizard Lizzy"	Unknown	Unknown	March 5, 2021
23	10	"Bells and Whistles Will / Beatrice Builder"	Unknown	Unknown	March 5, 2021
24	11	"Piano Paul / Grandma Gracie"	Unknown	Unknown	March 5, 2021
25	12	"Freeze Pop Felix / Bowling Babette"	Unknown	Unknown	March 5, 2021
26	13	"T-Ball Toni / Trophy Todd"	Unknown	Unknown	March 5, 2021

=== Season 3 (2022-2023) ===
No. overall	No. in season	Title	Directed by	Written by	Original release date
27	1	"Delivery Delia / Knight Niko"	Unknown	Adam Peltzman	May 27, 2022
28	2	"Mail Carrier Marty / His Royal Primmness"	Unknown	Unknown	May 27, 2022
29	3	"Smoothie Samantha / Taxi Tina"	Unknown	Unknown	May 27, 2022
30	4	"Cheerleader Chadwick & Chelsea / Heart's Family Dinner"	Unknown	Adam Peltzman & Tim McKeon	May 27, 2022
31	5	"Pancake Flipping Pietro / Scatter's Band"	Unknown	Unknown	May 27, 2022
32	6	"Race Car Roxy / Helpsters Go to the Beach"	Unknown	Unknown	May 27, 2022
33	7	"Sporty Spencer / Giveaway Day"	Joe Menendez	Tim McKeon	May 27, 2022
34	8	"Birthday Performer Bart / Supermarket Sue"	Unknown	Unknown	January 6, 2023
35	9	"Weather-Loving Winston / Veterinarians Vera and Vinnie"	Unknown	Unknown	January 6, 2023
36	10	"Traveling Tracy / Inventor Ines"	Unknown	Unknown	January 6, 2023
37	11	"Scuba Skylar / Librarians Leroy, Lana, & Luke"	Unknown	Unknown	January 6, 2023
38	12	"Mechanic Mel / Robby & Rhonda Run Again"	Unknown	Unknown	January 6, 2023
39	13	"Wizard Wallace / Heart Goes to the Dentist"	Unknown	Unknown	January 6, 2023
40	14	"Nurse Nina / Helpsters' Hundredth Help"	Unknown	Unknown	January 6, 2023

== Reception ==
=== Accolades ===
Year	Award	Category	Recipient(s)	Result	Ref.
2020	Daytime Emmy Awards	Outstanding Special Effects Costume. Make Up and Hairstyling	Andrea Detwiler, Jean Marie Keevins, Jimmy Helvin, Marc, Petrosino, Michael Latini	Nominated	
2020	Daytime Emmy Awards	Outstanding Costume Design/Styling	Zeynep Netherton, Mikaela Wohl	Nominated	
2020	Daytime Emmy Awards	Outstanding Single Camera Editing	Robert Arrucci	Nominated	
2020	Daytime Emmy Awards	Outstanding Directing for a Children's or Young Adult Program	Tim McKeon, Connor White, Amy Keating Rogers, Laurie Israel, Annabeth Bondor-Stone, Liz Hara, Anna Christopher, Rachel Lewis, Alex Fox, Nick Confalone	Nominated	
2020	Daytime Emmy Awards	Outstanding Preschool Children's Series	Tim McKeon, Kay Wilson Stallings, Benjamin Lehmann, Melanie Grisanti, Michael J. Cargill, Alex Fox, Rachel Lewis, Jackie Stolfi, Eileen Bernstien	Nominated	
