= Michael Curry (puppet designer) =

American production designer

- Born: March 19, 1958 (age 67); Grants Pass, Oregon, U.S.
- Occupations: Scenic, Costume and Puppet Designer

Michael Curry (born March 19, 1958) is an American production designer who lives in Portland, Oregon. He is also the owner and President of Michael Curry Design Inc. in Scappoose, Oregon, which was started in 1986.

Curry works widely in technical development with such renowned entertainment companies as Cirque du Soleil, the Metropolitan Opera, London's Royal National Theatre, Walt Disney Theatrical and theme parks worldwide. He works regularly with directors such as Robert Lepage, Nicholas Hytner, Julie Taymor and William Friedken. He has also worked with production designers such as George Tsypin and the late Mark Fisher. Curry has been the recipient of many distinguished awards from his peers, including various awards for his puppet and costume work on Broadway, Olympic ceremonies and his continuing creations and work in the field of visual effects and puppetry design. He owns and operates Michael Curry Design Inc., which designs and creates live-performance oriented dimensional characters and productions, such as those seen by worldwide audiences in the 1996, 2002, 2010 and 2014 Olympics opening and closing ceremonies, in the 2000 & 2012 Super Bowl, and New York City's epoch 2000 millennium event.

== Olympic work ==
=== 2002 Winter Olympics ===
Curry shared an Emmy Award with influential Trinidadian Carnival designer Peter Minshall for costume/performance designs created for the opening ceremonies of the Olympic Games in Salt Lake City in 2002. The first notable American event following the September 11, 2001 attacks, the ceremony blended light, puppets, and story.

== Epcot ==
At Epcot, in Disney World, Curry created 120 towering puppets, which he titled the Tapestry of Nations (would later become Tapestry of Dreams), that paraded around the lake when sunset arrived. This parade featured the largest speaker system in the world, featuring 416 speakers and 137 amplifiers. The parade ended in March 2003 in its Tapestry of Dreams form. The puppets themselves have occasionally been brought out for special events.

== Theatrical work ==
Curry works often in theatre, collaborating with the best in the industry. He has worked on Broadway, at The Metropolitan Opera, and at the Royal National Theatre to name a few. He also works as a conceptual and technical consultant in the live performance industry.

=== The Lion King on Broadway ===
Curry was made famous not only by the Olympic ceremonies he designed, but also for his puppet co-design with Julie Taymor in the highly acclaimed musical, The Lion Kingin 1998. In 2014 The Lion King has become the highest-grossing musical in history.

=== L'Amour de loin - Metropolitan Opera - Directed by Robert LaPage ===
2017 New Production Award for L’Amour de loin at The Metropolitan Opera with Robert Lepage (scenic and costume design) – International Opera Awards

=== Finding Nemo ===
Curry designed the puppets used in Finding Nemo – The Musical at Disney's Animal Kingdom.

=== Rivers of Light ===
Curry is production designer for the night-time show at Disney's Animal Kingdom, Rivers of Light.

=== Frozen – Live at Disneyland Resort, Frozen on Broadway, Frozen Disney Cruise Lines ===
Curry designed the puppets that are used in the musical Frozen – Live at the Hyperion at Disney California Adventure., Frozen on Broadway and Frozen Disney Cruise Lines.

== Cirque du Soleil ==
Curry has designed on five Cirque du Soleil shows. Kà (directed by Robert Lepage at the MGM Grand Las Vegas, and LOVE (directed by Dominique Champagne at the MGM Mirage, also in Las Vegas). He also designed the illusions for Cirque du Soleil and Criss Angel at the LUXOR 2009. Curry was the scenic and puppet designer for Cirque du Soleil's Michael Jackson's Immortal World Tour.

== Center for Puppetry Arts ==
Three major pieces by Curry are on permanent display at the Center for Puppetry Arts in Atlanta, Georgia - an interactive full-body puppet of a praying mantis, a 9-foot-tall (2.7 m) animatronic original by Curry called the Trashcan Phoenix, and a user-controlled animatronic puppet of Xelas, a shapechanger from Native American mythology.

== Awards ==
- Emmy Award for the 2002 Olympics Opening Ceremony in Salt Lake City (Outstanding Costumes for a Variety or Music Program)
- 1998 Tony Award for Best Costume Design for The Lion King (shared with Julie Taymor)
- Drama Desk Award for The Lion King (Outstanding Puppet Design)
- Drama Desk Award for Disney's Frozen (Outstanding Puppet Design)
- Top 100 Honoree by Irish America Magazine, 2000
- Cannes Film Festival, Performance Pieces, Art Director (Best Fiction, Short)
- The American Theater Wing Designer Award for The Lion King
- Los Angeles Drama Critics Circle, (Distinguished Achievement) 2000 Mask & Puppet Design, Co-Designer with Julie Taymor, The Lion King
- Entertainment Design and Theatre Crafts International, 1999 EDDY Award (Puppet Designer)
- Featured Artist, Prague Quadrennial (2007)
- Risorgiomento Creativity Award (for lifelong creativity and risk taking in the fields of technical and Artistic Design), 2001
