= Sonny Tilders =

Australian animatronics artist

Sonny Tilders is an Australian animatronics artist, known for his work as creative director of the Creature Technology Company.

== Works ==
Tilders led the team that designed and built the animatronics for Walking with Dinosaurs − The Arena Spectacular, which premiered in 2007. He was also the creature-maker for the 2012 arena production of How To Train Your Dragon, produced by CTC's parent company, Global Creatures Group, and Hollywood studio DreamWorks. In 2013, he created the on-stage puppet of the title character for the musical production of King Kong, which premiered at Melbourne's Regent Theatre before moving to Broadway. At the time, it was reportedly the largest animatronic puppet ever created for a theatrical production.

== Awards ==
In 2019, for his work on the King Kong puppet, Tilders won the Drama Desk Award for Outstanding Puppet Design, the Outer Critics Circle Special Achievement Award, and a Special Tony Award.

== Biography ==
Tilders grew up in Frankston, a southern suburb of Melbourne, with his mother and stepfather, who were both school teachers. His biological father was the Australian blues singer and guitarist Dutch Tilders, although Dutch was not present for most of Sonny's childhood.
