= Zama Magudulela =

South African actor and singer

- Occupations: actor and singer

Zamavus "Zama" Magudulela is a South African actor and singer who performed the role of Rafiki in the Paris, Madrid, São Paulo and Toronto productions of The Lion King musical.

== Early life and education ==
Magudulela grew up in Durban and started singing at the age of nine. She was a member of the local gospel choir Umlazi before joining the choir at her college, aged 12.

She has a degree in management and marketing.

== Career ==
Magudulela's first acting job was in Mbongeni Ngema's production of The Zulu Show and then as a backing singer in for Ngema's albums Isimukanandwendwe and Baba kaMdudu.

She worked as a backing singer for Busi Mhlongo before auditioning for The Lion King musical in Melbourne in 2003 and becoming the understudy for the Rafiki shaman character. In 2006, she joined The Lion King cast in Hamburg, still as the Rafiki understudy, and later joined the Paris cast as the Rafiki main character. She features in the 2007 recording of the Paris production. She later performed as Rafiki in the Madrid production of the musical.

From 2019-2020 Magudulela worked as a vocalist at Cirque du Soleil on their production of Totem.

As of November 2024, she portrays Rafiki in the Toronto production of The Lion King. She now is playing Rafiki in The Lion King North American tour.
