= Monkey Boys Productions =

- Industry: Theater, TV, Film - Puppet, Prop, Costume, Creature, and Practical Effect Design and Fabrication; Puppetry; Production
- Founded: 2006
- Founder: Marc Petrosino, Michael Latini, Russell Tucker, and Scott Hitz
- Headquarters: United States
- Members: Marc Petrosino and Michael Latini
- Website: monkeyboysproductions.com

Monkey Boys Productions is a two-time Emmy-nominated production company that creates puppets, props, creatures, costumes, practical effects and original content for film, television and stage. Located near Philadelphia, Pennsylvania, they work with companies and productions across the globe.

The company was originally founded in 2006 by Marc Petrosino, Michael Latini, Russell Tucker, and Scott Hitz. Over the company's first nine years, they designed and built puppets for assorted theatrical productions, theme parks, streaming shows, and independent films. During this time, Russell and Scott moved on to other pursuits, leaving Marc and Michael to run the company.

Before the company's founding, Marc and Michael had performed in assorted productions of Little Shop of Horrors (including Broadway and the 1st National Tour). Their friend and mentor, Martin P. Robinson (the father of theatrical Audrey IIs), encouraged MBP building their own set of Audrey II puppets, which they continue to rent to theaters across North America. In 2015, Saturday Night Live rented those puppets for use in a sketch which was cut from the show. This introduction led to MBP eventually becoming the regular puppet and specialized prop builders for SNL, including the lecterns for the series of Melissa McCarthy sketches spoofing Sean Spicer.

Monkey Boys Productions' work on SNL led to the company evolving from a puppet-centric company into one that specializes in designing, fabricating, and producing practical items. In the years since, MBP has created puppets and props for The Tonight Show with Jimmy Fallon, The Today Show, Last Week Tonight with John Oliver, Late Night with Jimmy Fallon, Mystery Science Theater 3000, Late Night with Seth Meyers, Pose, Albie's Elevator for PBS, and many commercials. Monkey Boys Productions has been nominated for two Emmys for their puppet design and fabrication for the Sesame Workshop series Helpsters on Apple TV+.

They have also worked extensively on Broadway, creating props and puppets for The Music Man, Amélie, Charlie and The Chocolate Factory, Mr. Saturday Night, Skin of Our Teeth, Diana, Gary: A Sequel to Titus Andronicus, and others. Recently, they worked with designer Nicholas Mahon to create new Audrey II puppets for the current production of Little Shop of Horrors playing at the Westside Theatre.
