= Big Nazo =

Improv performance group

Big Nazo

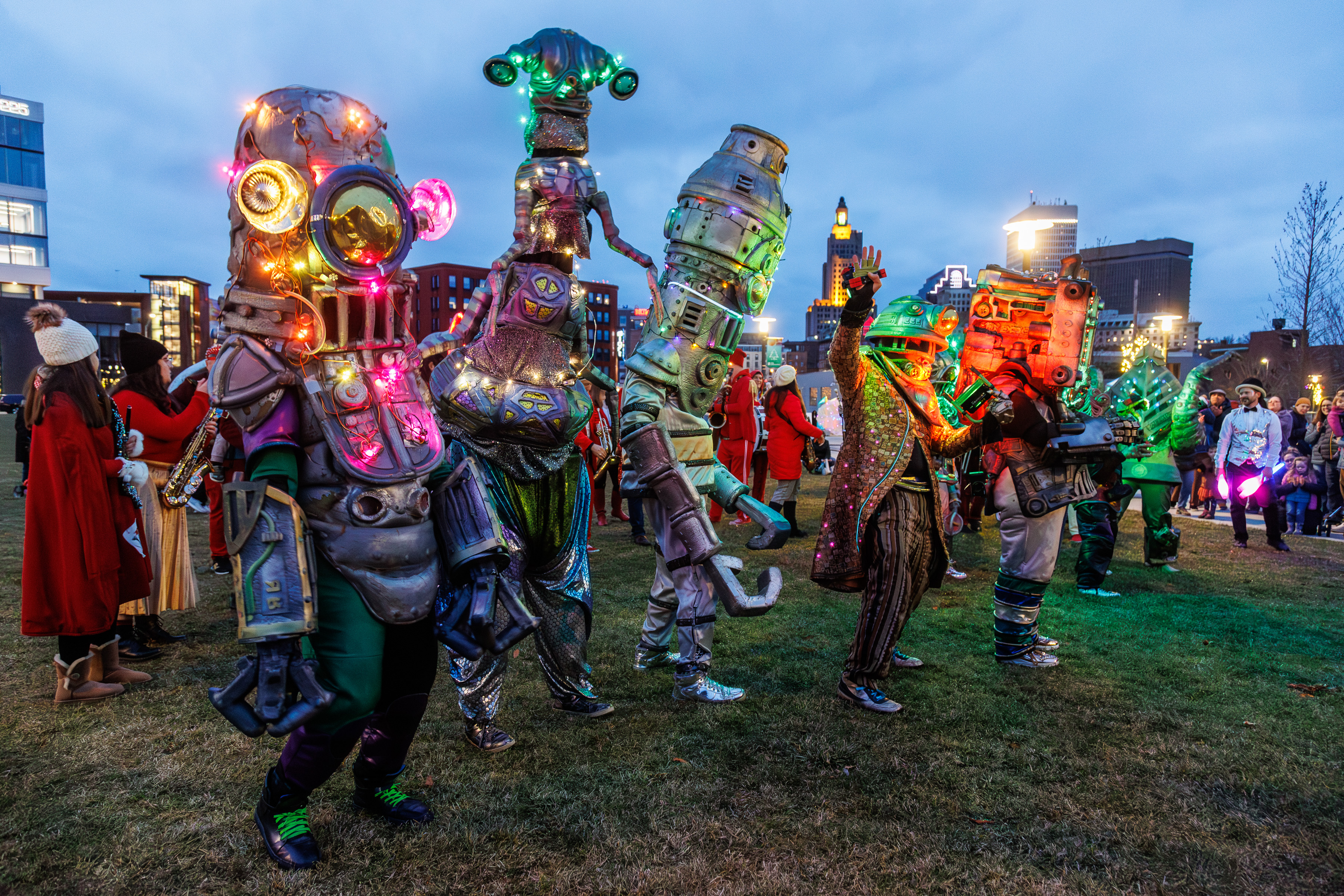
2024 Lumina Festival

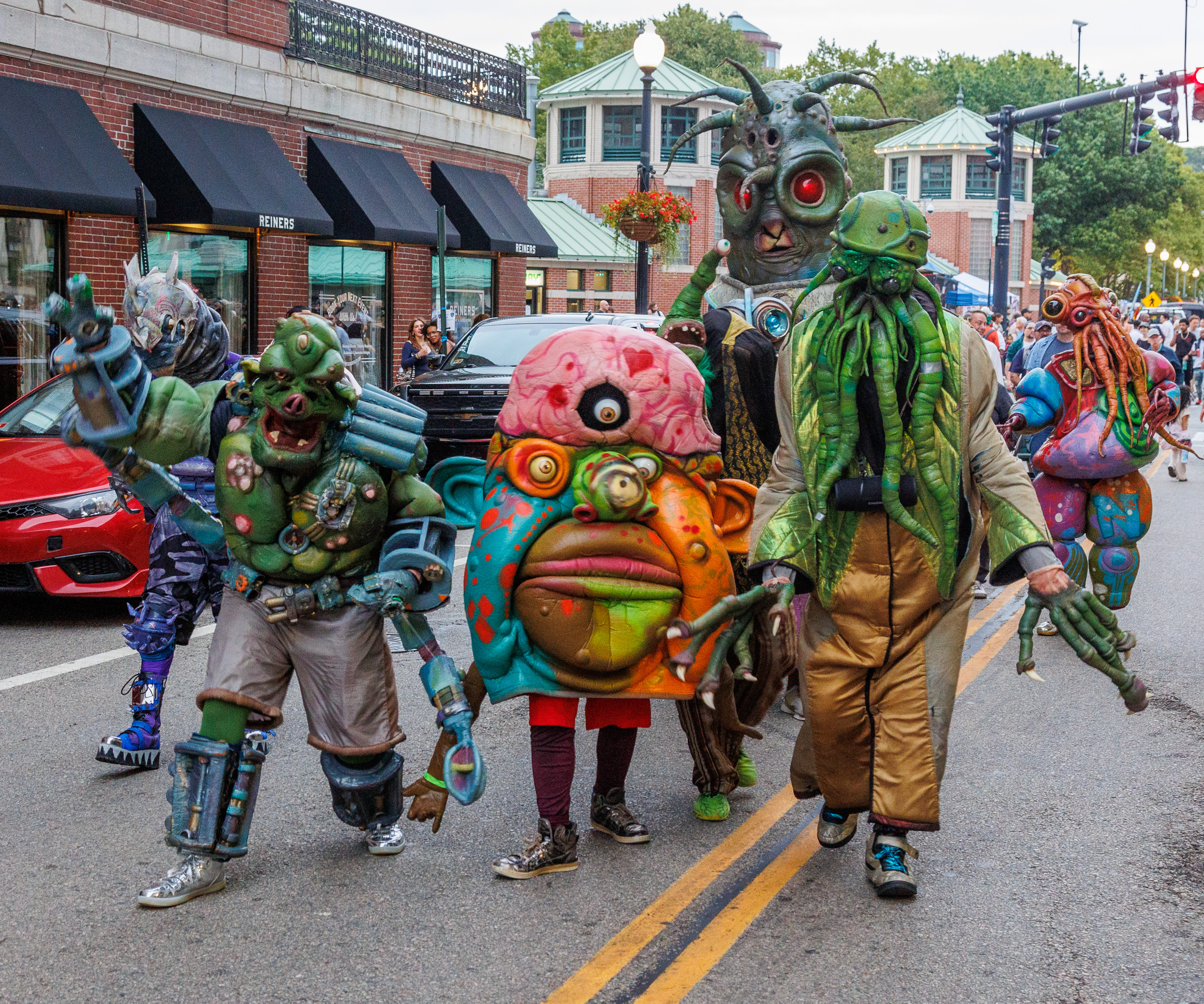
PVDFest 2024

Big Nazo is an improv performance group launched in 1986 and headquartered in Providence, Rhode Island. Erminio Pinque, the founder and artistic designer of Big Nazo, envisioned his concept as a puppet show without the stage.

Big Nazo, which derives its name from "big nose" in Italian, runs a "creature class" in conjunction with the Rhode Island School of Design Film and Video Department during the winter semester.

== Performances ==
The Big Nazo troupe frequently appears at local cultural events such as parades, Lumina Festival and PVDFest. Outside of Rhode Island, the group has performed in New York, Chicago, Nashville, Los Angeles, New Orleans, Quebec, Nova Scotia, Japan, Portugal and Scotland. The troupe has appeared at the 2010 Winter Olympics and was a featured guest at the Maine Eclipse Festival in 2024.
