= List of best-selling Sega Genesis games =

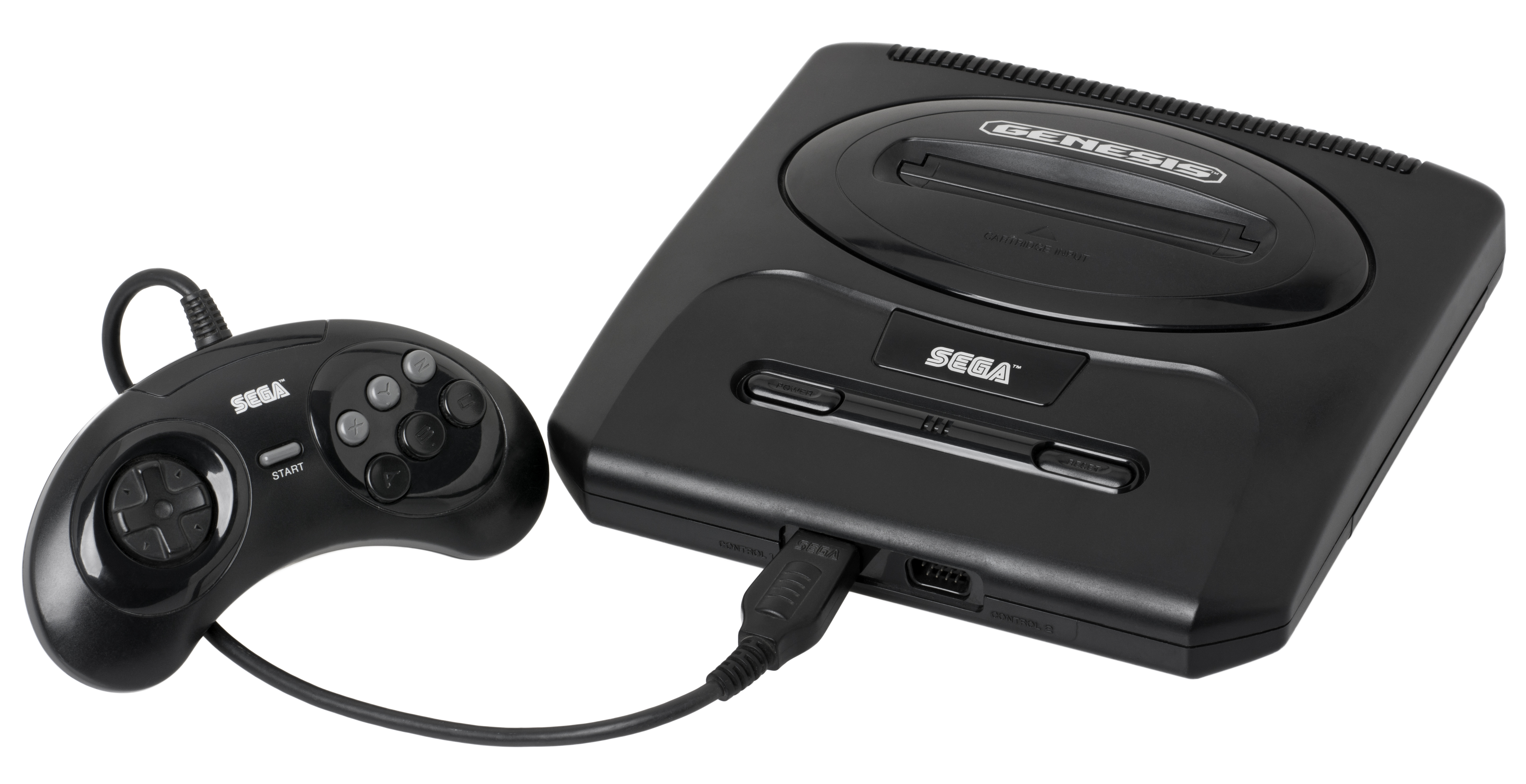
Sega Genesis, along with its controller

This is a list of Sega Genesis / Mega Drive video games that have sold or shipped at least one million copies, sorted in order of copies sold. The best-selling title is Sonic the Hedgehog, first released in North America on June 23, 1991. Due to being bundled with the console, it sold 15 million copies. The second best-selling game is its sequel, 1992's Sonic the Hedgehog 2, which was also bundled with many consoles with more than 7.55 million copies sold.

== List ==
Sega Genesis/Mega Drive games that have sold or shipped at least one million copies
| Title | Copies sold | Release date | Developer(s) | Publisher(s) |
|---|---|---|---|---|
| Sonic the Hedgehog | 15 million | June 23, 1991 | Sonic Team | Sega |
| Sonic the Hedgehog 2 | 7.55 million | November 21, 1992 | Sega Technical Institute | Sega |
| Sonic the Hedgehog 3; Sonic & Knuckles | 6.2 million (Note: Once the Genesis sold 20 million, 31% were for Sonic the Hedgehog 3 and Sonic & Knuckles's game data) | February 2, 1994; October 18, 1994 | Sega Technical Institute; Sega Technical Institute | Sega; Sega |
| Mortal Kombat | 4.33 million | September 13, 1993 | Midway | Acclaim Entertainment |
| Disney's Aladdin | 4 million | October 19, 1993 | Virgin Games | Sega |
| John Madden Football '93 | 3 million (Note: Once the Genesis sold 20 million, 15% were for John Madden Football '93's game data) | December 1992 | Electronic Arts | Electronic Arts |
| NHL '94 | 2.6 million (Note: Once the Genesis sold 20 million, 13% were for NHL '94's game data) | September 1993 | Electronic Arts | Electronic Arts |
| Joe Montana Football | 2.2 million (Note: Once the Genesis sold 20 million, 11% were for Joe Montana Football's game data) | December 1990 | Park Place Productions | Sega |
| Jurassic Park | 2.2 million | August 10, 1993 | BlueSky Software | Sega |
| NBA Jam | 1.93 million | March 4, 1994 | Midway | Acclaim Entertainment |
| Mortal Kombat II | 1.78 million | September 9, 1994 | Midway | Acclaim Entertainment |
| Street Fighter II': Special Champion Edition | 1.665 million | September 27, 1993 | Capcom | Capcom |
| Eternal Champions | 1.6 million | December 11, 1993 | Sega Interactive Development Division | Sega |
| FIFA Soccer 95 | 1.5 million | November 11, 1994 | Electronic Arts | Electronic Arts |
| Altered Beast | 1.4 million (Note: Once the Genesis sold 20 million, 11% were for Joe Montana Football's game data) | August 14, 1989 | Team Shinobi | Sega |
| X-Men | 1 million | March 8, 1993 | Western Technologies Inc | Sega |
| Mortal Kombat 3 | 1.02 million | October 13, 1995 | Midway | Williams Entertainment; Acclaim Entertainment |
| Ms. Pac-Man | 1 million | July 1991 | General Computer Corporation; Midway Manufacturing | Midway Manufacturing |
| NFL '98 | 1 million | May 14, 1997 | Spectacular Games; FarSight Technologies | Sega |
| NFL Football '94 | 1 million | November 1993 | BlueSky Software | Sega |
| Sonic Spinball | 1 million | November 23, 1993 | Sega Technical Institute | Sega |
| Mighty Morphin Power Rangers | 1 million | November 1994 | Nova | Sega |
| Streets of Rage | 1 million (Note: Once the Genesis sold 20 million, 5% were for Streets of Rage's game data) | August 1991 | Sega | Sega |
| Sonic 3D Blast | 1 million | November 1996 | Traveller's Tales; Sonic Team | Sega |

== See also ==
- List of best-selling video games
- List of best-selling video game franchises
- Lists of best-selling video games by platform
  - List of best-selling Nintendo Entertainment System video games
  - List of best-selling Super Nintendo Entertainment System video games
  - List of best-selling Game Boy video games
- List of video games considered the best
