= List of best-selling Dreamcast games =

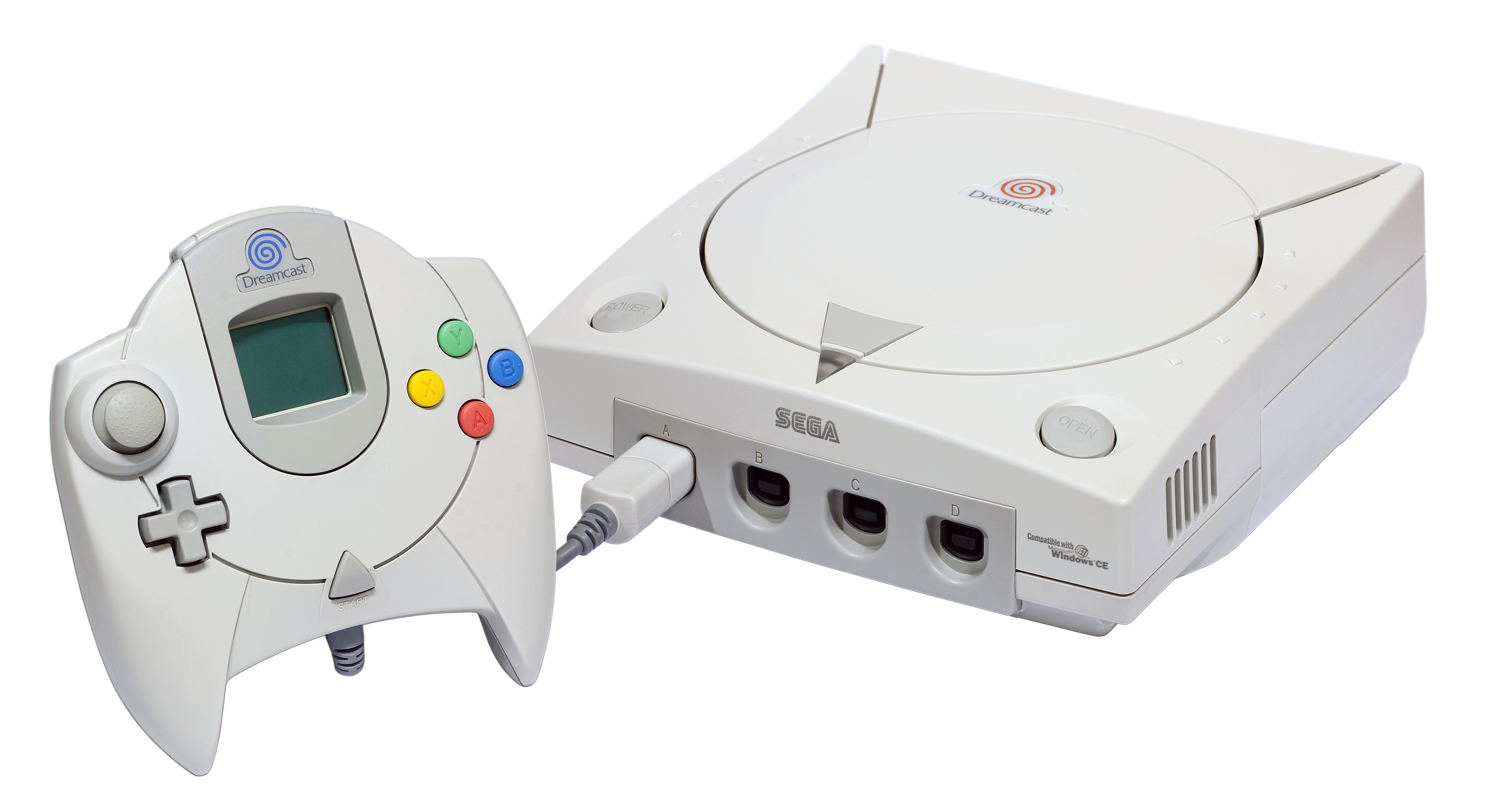

This is a list of video games for the Dreamcast video game console that have sold or shipped at least 150,000 copies or more. Sega launched the Dreamcast in Japan on November 27, 1998, in North America on September 9, 1999, and in Europe on October 14, 1999. In North America, first day sales for the console reached $100 million.

On January 31, 2001, Sega announced that they would be transitioning to third-party developers and publishing games for Nintendo, Sony, and Microsoft's consoles, while the Dreamcast was discontinued on March 31, 2001.

According to PC Data, the top ten best-selling Dreamcast Games in 2000 were, in order: NFL 2K1, Crazy Taxi, NBA 2K1, Shenmue, Resident Evil – Code: Veronica, NHL 2K, World Series Baseball 2K1, Sonic Adventure, NBA 2K and Tony Hawk's Pro Skater 2. At 2.5 million copies, Sonic Adventure is the best-selling Dreamcast game.

According to GamePro, the Dreamcast's game library was celebrated. In January 2000, Electronic Gaming Monthly wrote that "with triple-A stuff like Soul Calibur, NBA 2K, and soon Crazy Taxi to kick around, we figure you're happy you took the 128-bit plunge". In a retrospective, PC Magazine referred to Dreamcast's "killer library" and said that Sega's creative influence and visual innovation had been at its peak.

== List ==
List of best-selling Sega Dreamcast games
| Game | Developer(s) | Publisher(s) | Release date | Sales | Genre(s) |
|---|---|---|---|---|---|
| Sonic Adventure | Sonic Team | Sega | December 23, 1998 | 2.5 million | Action-adventure |
| Soulcalibur | Project Soul | Namco | August 5, 1999 | >1.3 million | Fighting |
| Shenmue | Sega AM2 | Sega | December 29, 1999 | 1.2 million | Action-adventure |
| Resident Evil – Code: Veronica | Capcom Production Studio 4 | Capcom | February 3, 2000 | 1.14 million | Survival horror |
| NFL 2K | Visual Concepts | Sega | September 9, 1999 | 1.13 million | Sports |
| Crazy Taxi | Hitmaker | Sega | January 27, 2000 | 1.11 million | Street racing |
| NFL 2K1 | Visual Concepts | Sega | September 7, 2000 | 1.01 million | Sports |
| NBA 2K | Visual Concepts | Sega | November 11, 1999 | 768707 (Note: NBA 2k sales breakdown: USA – 725,045; Japan – 43,662) | Sports |
| NBA 2K1 | Visual Concepts | Sega | October 31, 2000 | 741,208 | Sports |
| House of the Dead 2 | Sega AM1 | Sega | March 25, 1999 | 574477 (Note: House of the Dead 2 sales breakdown: USA – 339,721; Japan – 234,756) | Light gun |
| Sega Rally 2 | Sega AM Annex | Sega | January 28, 1999 | 520827 (Note: Sega Rally 2 sales breakdown: USA – 145,942; Japan – 374,885) | Racing |
| Seaman | Vivarium Inc. Jellyvision | Sega | July 29, 1999 | 539,367 | Simulation |
| Blue Stinger | Climax Graphics | Sega/Activision | March 25, 1999 | 500,000 | Action-adventure |
| Sonic Adventure 2 | Sonic Team | Sega | June 19, 2001 | 500,000 | Platform, action adventure |
| Ready 2 Rumble Boxing | Midway Studios San Diego | Sega | September 9, 1999 | 466,687 | Boxing |
| Sega Bass Fishing | Sega | Sega | April 1, 1999 | 460415 (Note: Sega Bass Fishing sales breakdown: USA – 340,035; Japan – 120,380) | Fishing |
| Virtua Tennis | Sega | Sega | July 11, 2000 | 418859 (Note: Virtua Tennis sales breakdown: USA – 368,035; Japan – 50,824) | Sports |
| World Series Baseball 2K1 | Wow Entertainment | Sega | July 20, 2000 | 415,487 | Sports |
| Virtua Fighter 3tb | Sega AM2 | Sega | November 27, 1998 | 405123 (Note: Virtua Fighter 3 sales breakdown: USA – 96,416; Japan – 308,707) | Fighting |
| J.League Pro Soccer Club o Tsukurou! | Sega Software R&D Dept. 6 | Sega | September 30, 1999 | 369,116 | Sports |
| Jet Set Radio | Smilebit | Sega | June 29, 2000 | 355866 (Note: Jet Set Radio sales breakdown: USA – 291,609; Japan – 64,257) | Cross-genre |
| NHL 2K | Black Box Games | Sega | February 9, 2000 | 348,000 | Sports |
| Sakura Wars 3: Is Paris Burning? | Red Entertainment | Sega | March 22, 2001 | 342,815 | Cross-genre |
| Virtua Striker 2 Ver. 2000.1 | Sega Software R&D Dept. 4 | Sega | December 02, 1999 | 319,825 | Sports |
| Tomb Raider: The Last Revelation | Core Design | Capcom | March 24, 2000 | 300,835 | Action-adventure |
| Tony Hawk's Pro Skater 2 | Neversoft | Activision | September 19, 2000 | 286,000 | Sports |
| Sakura Wars 4: Fall in Love, Maidens | Red Entertainment | Sega | March 21, 2002 | 283,190 | Cross-genre |
| NBA 2K2 | Visual Concepts | Sega | October 23, 2001 | 252,727 | Sports |
| Crazy Taxi 2 | Hitmaker | Sega | May 13, 2001 | 244,367 | Street racing |
| NFL Blitz 2000 | Midway Games | Midway Games | September 9, 1999 | 233,821 | Sports |
| WWE Royal Rumble | Yuke's | THQ | August 14, 2000 | 228,908 | Fighting, sports |
| Marvel Vs. Capcom | Capcom | Capcom | March 25, 1999 | 213,691 | Fighting |
| Legacy of Kain: Soul Reaver | Crystal Dyanmics | Edios Interactive | January 25, 2000 | 207,879 | Action-adventure |
| Ultimate Fighting Championship | Anchor | Various | August 30, 2000 | 205,975 | Fighting, sports |
| Sega GT | Wow Entertainment | Sega | February 17, 2000 | 202,123 | Racing |
| Hydro Thunder | Eurocom | Midway Games | September 9, 1999 | 200,23 | Racing |
| Dead or Alive 2 | Team Ninja | Tecmo | February 29, 2000 | 199,75 | Fighting |
| Marvel Vs. Capcom 2 | Capcom | Capcom | March 30, 2000 | 199,286 | Fighting |
| WWF Attitude | Acclaim Entertainment | Acclaim Entertainment | November 5, 1999 | 199,239 | Fighting |
| Power Stone | Capcom | Capcom | February 25, 1999 | 193,923 | Fighting |
| Toy Commander | No Cliché | Sega | October 14, 1999 | 188,427 | Action-adventure |
| World Series Baseball 2K2 | Visual Concepts | Sega | August 14, 2001 | 184,901 | Sports |
| Rainbow Six | Pipe Dream Interactive | Red Storm Entertainment | May 3, 2000 | 183,948 | Tactical shooter |
| Sega Smash Pack: Volume 1 | Sega | Sega | January 30, 2001 | 181,623 | Various |
| Mortal Kombat Gold | Eurocom | Midway Games | September 9, 1999 | 180,873 | Fighting |
| Space Channel 5 | United Game Artists | Sega | December 16, 1999 | 179,940 | Music, rhythm |
| Phantasy Star Online | Sonic Team | Sega | December 21, 2000 | 166,824 (Note: Indicates North American sales only) | Action-adventure, RPG |

== See also ==
- List of best-selling video games
- Lists of best-selling video games by platform
- List of Dreamcast games
