= Lists of best-selling video games by platform =

The following are lists of best-selling video games by individual platform.

== Platforms ==
=== Atari ===
- List of best-selling Atari 2600 video games

=== Microsoft ===
- List of best-selling Xbox video games
- List of best-selling Xbox 360 video games
- List of best-selling Xbox One video games

=== Nintendo ===
- List of best-selling Nintendo Entertainment System video games
- List of best-selling Game Boy video games
- List of best-selling Super Nintendo Entertainment System video games
- List of best-selling Nintendo 64 video games
- List of best-selling Game Boy Advance video games
- List of best-selling GameCube video games
- List of best-selling Nintendo DS video games
- List of best-selling Wii video games
- List of best-selling Nintendo 3DS video games
- List of best-selling Wii U video games
- List of best-selling Nintendo Switch video games
- List of best-selling Nintendo Switch 2 games

=== Sega ===
- List of best-selling Sega Genesis games
- List of best-selling Sega Saturn games
- List of best-selling Sega Dreamcast games

=== Sony ===
- List of best-selling PlayStation video games
- List of best-selling PlayStation 2 video games
- List of best-selling PlayStation Portable video games
- List of best-selling PlayStation 3 video games
- List of best-selling PlayStation 4 video games
- List of best-selling PlayStation 5 video games

=== PC ===
- List of best-selling PC games

=== Other ===
- List of highest-grossing arcade games

== See also ==
- List of best-selling video games
- List of best-selling video game franchises
