= Sonic the Hedgehog (1991 video game) =

1991 video game

- North American box art by Greg Wray
- Developer: Sonic Team (Note: A team within Sega)
- Publisher: Sega
- Designer: Hirokazu Yasuhara
- Programmer: Yuji Naka
- Artists: Naoto Ohshima; Jina Ishiwatari; Rieko Kodama
- Composer: Masato Nakamura
- Series: Sonic the Hedgehog
- Platform: Sega Genesis: Arcade, Game Boy Advance, Nintendo 3DS, iOS, Android, Amazon Fire TV, Apple TV, Nintendo Switch
- Release: June 1991: Genesis; NA/PAL: June 1991; JP: July 26, 1991 Arcade; WW: 1991 Game Boy Advance; NA: November 14, 2006 Nintendo 3DS; JP: May 15, 2013; WW: December 5, 2013 iOS; WW: May 2009 (Note: Original release); EU: May 15, 2013 (Note: 2013 remake release); NA: May 16, 2013 Android; WW: May 16, 2013 Switch; WW: September 20, 2018
- Genre: Platform
- Mode: Single-player

Sonic the Hedgehog (Note: Japanese: ソニック・ザ・ヘッジホッグ, Hepburn: Sonikku za Hejjihoggu) is a 1991 platform game developed by Sonic Team and published by Sega for the Sega Genesis. It was released in North America and PAL regions in June and in Japan the following month. The player controls Sonic, a hedgehog who can run at supersonic speeds. The story follows Sonic as he aims to foil the mad scientist Doctor Robotnik's plans to seek the powerful Chaos Emeralds. The gameplay involves collecting rings as a form of health, and a simple control scheme, with jumping and attacking controlled by a single button.

Development began in 1990 when Sega ordered its developers to create a game featuring a mascot for the company. The developers chose a blue hedgehog designed by Naoto Ohshima of Sega R&D9 after he won an internal character design contest, and named themselves Sonic Team to match their character. It uses a novel technique that allows Sonic's sprite to roll along curved scenery which was based on a concept by Oshima from 1989. Sonic the Hedgehog, designed for fast gameplay, was influenced by games by the Mario creator, Shigeru Miyamoto. The music was composed by Masato Nakamura, bassist of the J-pop band Dreams Come True.

Sonic the Hedgehog received positive reviews for its visuals, audio, and gameplay and is widely considered one of the greatest video games. It sold over 40 million copies across all platforms, becoming one of the best-selling video games. On the Genesis, which it was bundled with, it sold over 15 million copies, making it the best-selling Genesis game. It established the Genesis as a key player in the 16-bit era and made it competitive with the Super NES. It has been ported to multiple systems and inspired several clones, a successful franchise, and adaptations into other media. Sonic the Hedgehog 2 was released in November 1992.

== Gameplay ==
The game's first level: Green Hill Zone

Sonic the Hedgehog is a platform game where players control the titular character Sonic, who is tasked with defeating Doctor Robotnik (Note: Known as Doctor Eggman in the Japanese version) and obtaining the six Chaos Emeralds. The game takes place from a side-scrolling perspective. He is capable of running at high speed through levels that include springs, slopes, bottomless pits, and vertical loops. The levels are populated with robot enemies, inside which Dr. Eggman has trapped animals; destroying a robot frees the animal, but is not necessary to complete the game. His primary form of offense is a spin attack, in which he curls into a ball and spins his body, damaging enemies and certain obstacles upon collision. This may be performed by jumping or rolling.

Scattered around each level are gold rings that can grant Sonic protection from a single enemy or hazard as well as an extra life if 100 are collected. Also scattered throughout the level are canisters containing power-ups such as additional rings and temporary invincibility. Signposts act as checkpoints where Sonic can respawn after losing a life.

The game is split into six principal zones, followed by a short Final Zone. Each main zone has its own visual style, and while some enemies appear throughout, each zone has unique enemies and obstacles. Each main zone is split into three acts, all of which must be completed. At the end of each main zone's third act, the player confronts Dr. Eggman for a boss fight. For most of the fights, Eggman's vehicle is fitted with different weapons. After completing the sixth zone, the player continues to the single-level Final Zone for a last encounter with Eggman inside a large machine environment. A brief animation shows Sonic's return to the first zone, with animals liberated from Dr. Eggman.

Reaching the end of any zone's Act 1 or Act 2 with 50 rings will cause a large ring to appear through which Sonic can jump to enter a bonus stage. In them, Sonic is perpetually curled up in his Spin Attack animation, and bounces off the bumpers and walls of a fully rotating maze. In these levels, the player earns a number of continues for each multiple of 50 rings collected, but the main goal is to obtain the Chaos Emerald hidden within the maze. Colliding with any of the blocks marked "GOAL" ends the level.

=== Plot ===
In his attempt to steal the six Chaos Emeralds and harness their power, the mad scientist Doctor Eggman has trapped the animal inhabitants of South Island inside aggressive robots and stationary metal capsules. The titular character, Sonic, a hedgehog named for his ability to run at supersonic speed, aims to thwart Eggman's plans by freeing his animal friends and collecting the emeralds himself. If Sonic collects all the Chaos Emeralds and completes the game, an ending sequence is shown. If all the emeralds are not collected, Eggman taunts the player while juggling any of the Chaos Emeralds not collected by the player in an alternate ending.

== Development ==
=== Background and character design ===
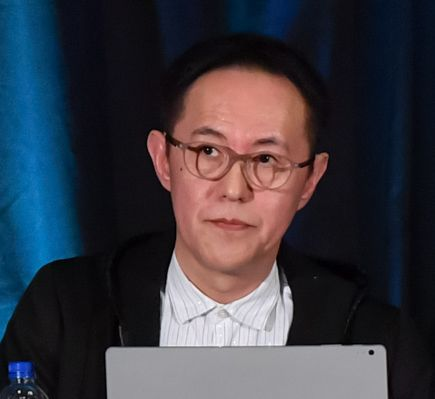
Character designer Naoto Ohshima

In the 1980s, Sega had limited success with Genesis ports of its arcade games, but wanted a stronger foothold against its main competitor, Nintendo. In 1988, Sega of Japan began an in-house competition to create a rival to Nintendo's mascot Mario. For the next three years, programmers and designers at Sega worked on a brand new character to rival Mario. In 1990, Sega ordered its in-house development studios to develop a game featuring a mascot for the company. Sega's president Hayao Nakayama wanted a character as iconic as Mickey Mouse.

Conception of Sonic the Hedgehog began in November 1989, when character designer Naoto Ohshima was working on another project titled Twin Stars. The story focused on a pair of twin brothers from the Dream World defending it against the boss of the Nightmare World, "Thirteen." The game was to feature smooth terrain and loops that the characters would run through. While the gameplay concept was approved by Ohshima's superiors, the characters were not, leaving Ohshima to come up with a new protagonist.

The team developed ideas for characters, an engine, and gameplay mechanics. Development emphasized speed, so Sega considered fast creatures such as kangaroos and squirrels and eliminated designs not associated with fast animals. One idea, a rabbit able to grasp objects with prehensile ears, showed promise but was too complex for the Genesis hardware. The team narrowed its search to animals that could roll into a ball, their idea for an attacking move, and considered armadillos and hedgehogs. The hedgehog character, proposed by employee Naoto Ohshima, prevailed. Ohshima went on vacation to New York, taking sketches with him. He went to Central Park and asked locals for their opinions on them, and Sonic was the favorite. A man with a moustache, who eventually became Dr. Robotnik, was in second place.

Sonic was originally teal-colored, then a light shade of blue, but he was changed to dark blue so he would stand out against certain backgrounds and to match the Sega logo. According to Ohshima, Sonic's basic design was created by combining Felix the Cat's head with Mickey Mouse's body. His shoes had buckles through the inspiration of Michael Jackson's boots on the album cover for Bad and the red and white color scheme of Santa Claus, whom Ohshima saw as the most "famous character in the world". Sonic's spikes were emphasized to make him sleeker, and he was given the ability to spin while jumping (so attacking and jumping could be controlled with one button). The new character was originally named "Mr. Hedgehog", but the eight-member team changed his name to "Sonic" and took the nickname Sonic Team. According to Yuji Naka, Sonic Team was a one-time unofficial nickname for the studio within Sega that was used during the development of the game; it was never mentioned again on the division's releases until Ohshima-directed and Naka-produced Nights into Dreams was released in 1996. The name would permanently stay when its successor Sega AM8 was spun off as Sonic Team Co., Ltd. in 2000.

Ohshima said that "Sonic" was chosen because it represented speed. Ideas proposed to flesh out the character included placing him in a rock band, giving him vampire fangs, and giving him a human girlfriend named Madonna. Sega of America scrapped these ideas to keep his identity simple. Sega of America also expressed concerns that most Americans would not know what a hedgehog is. According to Mark Cerny, who worked in Tokyo as an intermediary between the Japanese and American Sega offices, the American staff felt the character was "unsalvageable". They made plans to educate Sonic Team on character design with the work of Will Vinton, the creator of The California Raisins. They proposed a full-scale recreation of the character, but compromised with Sonic Team to simply make design changes for western audiences. The antagonist was named "Dr. Eggman" in Japan and "Dr. Robotnik" in other regions as a result of a dispute between Sega's American and Japanese divisions.

=== Concept and programming ===
With a satisfying protagonist established, Sega turned to programmer Yuji Naka, who had impressed executives with his work on Phantasy Star and the Genesis port of Ghouls 'n Ghosts. Naka was a fan of Super Mario Bros. but wanted something faster, so the game was made to play quickly, which was where he focused most of his effort. Production on Sonic the Hedgehog officially began in April 1990 and lasted about 14 months. Naka explained that the reason he wanted a fast game was that he had ported Ghouls 'n Ghosts, and wanted to work on its movement but found it slow.

Sonic the Hedgehog was developed by a team of seven at Sega R&D9: two programmers, two sound engineers, and three designers, although it began with just Ohshima and Naka. People came onto the team as the need for content increased. After being assigned a project with the code name "Defeat Mario", Ohshima and Naka began work, but encountered problems: Ohshima's Rabbit proved hard to program. Catching items and throwing them caused the action's rhythm to break. Naka stated that the rabbit was not suitable for his game engine, and he also wanted the game to be playable with only one button. Hirokazu Yasuhara came onto the team to supervise Ohshima and Naka and develop levels. He became the lead designer due to his greater experience, and found the way to make the game playable with only one button by having Sonic do damage by jumping. The trio came up with the idea of him rolling into a ball. After the hedgehog character was chosen, many characters were redrawn, and the team agreed on the environments' visual complexity, with particular focus on the colors. After this, four people came onto the team to speed development up.

Due to the popularity of Mario, Naka wanted Sonic to take over the American market. Sonic's default speed was set to that of Mario while running. Tests were run using the Genesis' tool library, and problems such as flickering, slow frame rates, and shaky animation soon became apparent. Increasing Sonic's speed caused animation problems. Naka solved this by developing an algorithm which retained fluidity. All that was left was to optimize of the game speed to adhere to the staff's expectations. The team noticed that different people had different perceptions of the game's speed: some believed it was too fast, which caused disagreements. As a result, it was slowed down.

The loop running was implemented in a tech demo by Naka, who developed an algorithm allowing a sprite to move smoothly on a curve by determining its position with a dot matrix. Naka's prototype was a platform game with a fast-moving character rolling in a ball through a long, winding tube, and this concept was fleshed out with Ohshima's character designs and levels by Yasuhara. Sonic the Hedgehog was unveiled at the Tokyo Toy Show, held between June 7–10, 1990. At this point, Sonic was only able to "run at high speed on a slightly wavy track." As so little was done at the time, the team wanted to try and "bluff" their way through the demo, making the game look far more polished than it actually was. Yasuhara originally intended to work on the game for three months due to the delay of his planned move to the United States by the outbreak of the Gulf War, but was engrossed in the project for nearly a year. His designs for levels were intended to attract both hardcore and casual gamers by integrating occasional challenging set pieces into mostly accessible level design. The color scheme was influenced by the work of pop artist Eizin Suzuki, and the aesthetics of Green Hill were influenced by the geography of California.

In designing the gameplay, Naka was inspired by Nintendo employee and Mario creator Shigeru Miyamoto, whose games he had enjoyed playing years earlier. Admiring the simplicity of Miyamoto's mechanics in complex environments, Naka decided that Sonic would be controlled with only a directional pad for movement and a single button for jumping. He also wanted his creation to be more action-oriented than the Mario series; while playing Super Mario Bros., he had wondered why the levels could not be cleared more quickly.

Ohshima, Naka, and Yasuhara worked 19 hours a day on the project for several months. Due to the need to demonstrate the Genesis' technological prowess, the game underwent extensive testing and redesign, which took over six months. According to Naka, the game had the fastest-ever character speed in a video game and a rotation effect in the bonus stages that had been considered impossible on the console.

The team intended to add a two-player mode displayed via split-screen, but Naka's programming knowledge was insufficient to implement it. A two-player mode appeared in Sonic the Hedgehog 2 (1992), whereby the second player controls Sonic's sidekick Miles "Tails" Prower. Sonic Team also intended to include a sound test with animations of Sonic breakdancing to a band of animal characters, including a crocodile keyboardist who was later introduced into the series as Vector the Crocodile in Knuckles' Chaotix in 1995. The sound test was scrapped for time reasons and Naka used the freed up memory to add the iconic "Se-ga!" chant used in TV commercials as a startup sound.

Naka's relationship with Sega was tenuous during this time, and he received little credit for his work. He left the company shortly after the game's release, although Sega of America hired him later. Before leaving, however, he defied Sega's prohibition of developer credits by displaying a few names in black text on a black background, identifiable only by looking at the code. Naka stated that level design was a major challenge: he created maps much wider than normal and tried to ensure players would not get lost. It took him around eight months to develop Green Hill Zone as he kept restarting from scratch. He stated that he found the process "very interesting". Throughout the rest of 1990, work on the game was behind closed doors. Sega of Japan instead promoted the upcoming title in other ways. In the November 1990 issue of Sega Players Enjoy Club, a brief "interview" with Sonic was published, establishing his attitude and his birthplace of Christmas Island. Naka also stated that the team was trying to create smooth maps, and that implementing looping structures was a challenge because Sonic would break through them instead of running around them. The backgrounds were also a challenge, as the game's speed created the impression of going backwards. The zones were based on designs by Naka and Ohshima, with the goal of creating the world's fastest action game. According to Ohshima, Robotnik's visual appearance was based on Humpty Dumpty.

Yasuhara wanted the game to appeal to both Japanese and American players, which was why Green Hill Zone was redesigned many times. Sonic Team wanted the level to portray the character correctly. Its checkered ground was inspired by 3D image rendering from computers, an idea Naka obtained from Sega developer Yu Suzuki, who used this technique with Space Harrier (1985). The team read Famitsu to stay informed of what their rivals were doing so they could avoid their mistakes.

During the final days of development, Sega of America mandated that Sonic’s color palette be changed from dark blue to a lighter, cyan hue to better contrast with the brown tones of the actuator rings in Green Hill Zone, a decision driven by the limited color reproduction capabilities of the Sega Genesis hardware.

=== Music ===
"Green Hill Zone Theme"
A 24-second portion of the theme for Green Hill Zone, composed by Hirokazu Yasuhara. It is one of the most iconic video game tracks.

Sega director Fujio Minegishi had connections to the music industry and suggested his friend Yūzō Kayama write the Sonic score. However, Sonic Team did not think Kayama's music would fit, and so commissioned Masato Nakamura, bassist and songwriter of the J-pop band Dreams Come True. Nakamura said he was surprised, as he had just started with Dreams Come True, but accepted as he was inspired by the team's desire to outperform Nintendo. He said the hardest part was working with the limited number of sounds that could play concurrently: he was limited to four, and said that his lack of knowledge of music on computers made it "impossible". He wrote the soundtrack concurrently with the Dreams Come True album Million Kisses. After he finished the compositions, they were digitized using an Atari ST and the program Notator.

On October 19, 2011, over 20 years after the release, a three-disc compilation of music from Sonic the Hedgehog and Sonic the Hedgehog 2 was released in Japan. The first disc features original tracks from both games, the second contains Nakamura's demo recordings before they were programmed into the Genesis, and the third has songs by Dreams Come True and their associated Akon remixes.

=== Packaging and release ===
Game-package illustrator Akira Watanabe said that his goal was to make the characters "colorful", using clear lines and gradation to "finish them neatly". According to Watanabe, the developers asked him to create a package design "similar to pop art ... without being particular to conventional packages" – something "original" and "stylish". Sonic was not revealed until the January 1991 Winter Consumer Electronics Show because Sega wanted to wait until the right time and because they saw an opportunity to "steal the show". Sonic the Hedgehog was believed to be the most impressive game at the show and won the CES award for innovation.

Sega of America CEO Tom Kalinske wanted reassurance that the character would not fail. The global head of marketing, Al Nilsen, and the senior product manager, Madeleine Schroeder, became involved in redesigning Sonic for American audiences. Artist Greg Wray was commissioned to redesign the character, and a new backstory was created where Sonic was from Nebraska. Sega playtested Sonic across the United States with Mario fans: they were shown Mario and then played Sonic the Hedgehog. 80 percent preferred Sonic the Hedgehog, and the game was shown at the 1991 Summer CES. The game was completed in May 1991, during Japan's Golden Week. It arrived in North America and the United Kingdom in June 1991 and in the PAL regions and Japan the following month. In November 1991, Sega of America included Sonic as a pack-in game with American Genesis consoles, replacing Altered Beast. This enabled Sega of America to sell 15 million Genesis units. Genesis owners who bought their consoles before the switch could request free copies of Sonic the Hedgehog by mail. Sega of America created a marketing campaign, making Sonic its new mascot.

== Other versions and rereleases ==
=== 8-bit version ===
A version of Sonic the Hedgehog was developed by Ancient and released in late 1991 for Sega's 8-bit consoles, the Master System and Game Gear. Its plot and gameplay mechanics are similar to the 16-bit version, though some level themes and digital assets are different and Chaos Emeralds are scattered throughout levels rather than bonus stages. Gameplay as a whole is simplified; the level design is flatter and has a larger focus on exploration, with no vertical loops, and Sonic cannot re-collect his rings after being hit. The game has a different soundtrack composed by Yuzo Koshiro, which includes adaptations of music from the original version. It was the final game released for the Master System in North America. The Master System version was re-released for the Wii's Virtual Console service in North America and Europe in August 2008. The Game Gear version was re-released for the Nintendo 3DS Virtual Console on June 13, 2013, and included as an unlockable game in Sonic Adventure DX: Director's Cut for GameCube and Windows and Sonic Mega Collection Plus for PlayStation 2, Xbox, and Windows. It was also released along with the other 11 Game Gear Sonic games on Sonic Origins Plus in 2023.

=== Sonic the Hedgehog Genesis ===
To mark the game's fifteenth anniversary, a port for the Game Boy Advance, Sonic the Hedgehog Genesis, was released on November 14, 2006, in the United States. While the port is mostly identical to the original, it includes several new features not seen in the original Genesis release, such as the ability to save game progress and the inclusion of the Spin Dash move. This version, unlike others, received poor reviews, with a Metacritic score of 33/100. The chief complaints concerned its poor conversion to the Game Boy Advance, resulting in a bad performance and poor implementation of the original music and gameplay.

As a response to the poor reception and claims that the system could not handle the original game, Simon "Stealth" Thomley, who later assisted with the development of the 2013 mobile port, released an unofficial, proof-of-concept version of Sonic the Hedgehog for the system. The unofficial version contains a complete Green Hill Zone and two bonus stages, as well as Tails and Knuckles as playable characters.

=== 2013 remake ===
A remake mobile port was released on iOS on May 15, 2013, with an Android version following the next day. This version was developed by Christian "Taxman" Whitehead and Simon Thomley of Headcannon from scratch using the Retro Engine, previously used in the 2011 remake of Sonic CD. This port features several enhancements, such as widescreen graphics, the optional ability to Spin Dash, an additional bonus stage, a time attack mode and the unlockable option to play as Tails or Knuckles; it additionally features a heavily expanded debug mode, which allows for use of unused elements and elements from more recent games (such as the characters' super forms). The iOS version was updated in 2016, adding compatibility with Apple TV.

=== 3D Sonic the Hedgehog ===
A Nintendo 3DS version, 3D Sonic the Hedgehog, was released as part of the 3D Classics line in 2013. This version, unlike most downloadable re-releases of the game, is not emulated; rather, the code was restructured to take advantage of the 3DS system's stereoscopic 3D graphics and comes with additional enhancements, such as the option to use the Spin Dash move, a CRT-style filter, and the option to start from any level.

=== Compilation releases ===
With its sequels for the Genesis, Sonic the Hedgehog has been ported for a wide range of home and handheld consoles and personal computers through compilations. The first collection it appeared in was Sonic Compilation (1995) for the Genesis. It has since appeared in Sonic Jam (1997) for the Saturn, Sonic Mega Collection (2002) for the GameCube, Sonic Mega Collection Plus (2004) for the PlayStation 2 and Xbox, Sega Genesis Collection (2006) for the PlayStation 2 and PSP, Sonic's Ultimate Genesis Collection (2009) for the Xbox 360 and PlayStation 3, Sonic Classic Collection (2010) for the Nintendo DS, Oculus Arcade for the Oculus Rift, and Sega Genesis Classics (2018) for Nintendo Switch, PlayStation 4, Windows, and Xbox One. The 2013 remake was included in the 2022 compilation Sonic Origins. This remake saw Amy Rose becoming a playable character in an upgraded version of Origins.

=== Downloadable releases ===
Sonic the Hedgehog has been available for all three major seventh-generation video game consoles. It was part of the Wii Virtual Console at the service's 2006 introduction, and was released for the Xbox Live Arcade and PlayStation Network shortly afterwards. The game was released for the iPod Classic, iPod video, and video-capable iPod Nano models in 2007 and for Apple's iOS in April 2009. Sonic the Hedgehog became available on GameTap in September 2009. In October 2010, it was released on Windows via Steam. Additionally, it is an unlockable reward in the console versions of Sonic Generations. The 2013 remake was made available on the Sega Forever service on iOS and Android in June 2017. A port for the Nintendo Switch was released on September 20, 2018 as part of M2's Sega Ages line of rereleases. It adds features including the ability to use moves from Sonic 2 and Sonic Mania, a challenge mode, a time attack for the first stage, and features from the 3DS rereleases of the game and its sequel.

=== Canceled versions ===
U.S. Gold acquired the rights to make a version of Sonic the Hedgehog for the Amiga, ZX Spectrum, Commodore 64, Amstrad CPC, and Atari ST personal computers, but these went unreleased. Several screenshots exist, some of which resemble the 8-bit version. An enhanced port for the Sega CD was also planned, but was canceled in favor of Sonic CD.

== Reception ==
Contemporary reception

Review scores
Publication	Score
ACE	925/1000; 5/5
Beep! MegaDrive	37/40
Computer and Video Games	94%
Dragon	5/5
Electronic Gaming Monthly	9/10, 9/10, 9/10, 9/10
Famitsu	8/10, 8/10, 9/10, 8/10
GamePro	24/25
Génération 4	97%
HobbyConsolas	95%
Joystick	98%
Player One	96%
Raze	95%
Entertainment Weekly	A+
Mean Machines	92%
Sega Power	97%

Awards
Publication	Award
Electronic Gaming Monthly (EGM), Golden Joystick Awards	Game of the Year
European Computer Trade Show (ECTS)	Best Video Game, Going Live Viewers Award

=== Sales ===
Sonic the Hedgehog was a commercial success. It became America's best-selling video game for several months in 1991, outselling Super Mario. By Christmas 1991, Sonic the Hedgehog had sold nearly 1 million game cartridges in the United States. It was also Blockbuster Video's highest-renting game of the year. In the United Kingdom, it was the top-selling Mega Drive game for two months following its release.

Sonic the Hedgehog was the best-selling home video game of 1991, with 2 million copies sold worldwide by the end of the year, becoming Sega's best-selling home video game up until then. In 1991, Sonic the Hedgehog helped Sega generate a gross revenue of $1 billion in console sales and capture a 65% share of the European console market. Sonic the Hedgehog set a Sega software sales record with 2.8 million cartridges sold by March 1992, including 1.8 million copies in the United States and another 1 million in Europe and Japan. The game went on to sell 3.7 million units by October 1992, and 4.5 million copies worldwide by November 1992. By 1997, the game had sold over 14 million copies worldwide, and earned over $400 million ($950 million adjusted for inflation), higher than the $200–300 million typically grossed by a blockbuster movie at the time.

The original version bundled with the Sega Genesis/Mega Drive hardware had sold over 15 million copies as of February 2009. The mobile game version also had eight million paid downloads by 2008, 482,960 units were sold on Xbox Live Arcade as of 2011, and 10 million paid Android downloads were sold as of 2017 bringing total sales to 33.5 million worldwide across all platforms.

=== Contemporary reviews ===
Sonic the Hedgehog was praised by critics, with scores above 90% from most video game magazines at the time. It was considered Sega's answer to Nintendo's widely popular Mario series, as it was a platformer featuring the company's mascot. In a preview following its CES debut in January 1991, John Cook of Computer and Video Games called it the most impressive game at the show and said it was "another jumpy jumpy game in the Mario mould, but with an astonishing turn of speed and great music." Upon release, Paul Rand of Computer and Video Games compared the two in depth and characterized Sonic the Hedgehog as being faster, with brighter colors and Super Mario World as having more "depth of play". Frank Ladoire of Génération 4 believed Sonic the Hedgehog was part of a new generation of games that demonstrate that the Mega Drive is capable of "beautiful things" in the technical department.

Reviewers praised the colorful, detailed graphics. Rand called its color scheme "lively, but never garish", praising the interaction of color with detail in the sprites, backgrounds, and animations and describing its graphics as the best available for the Mega Drive. Reviewer Boogie Man of GamePro called the intricate backgrounds "eye-popping" and "gorgeous", which was echoed by Mean Machines. The Lessers (Hartley, Patricia, and Kirk) of Dragon claimed the graphics made Sonic a possible contender for the best game of 1991 and GameZone called the animation "some of the smoothest and fastest ... ever seen". Julian Boardman of Raze praised the "colourful and highly detailed" backdrops and "fabulous" sprites. The music and sound effects were also well received; Dragon called them "great", and GameZone "amazing". Rand praised the "catchy" soundtrack, calling some of the sound effects "absolutely brilliant". Although Mean Machines called the songs "vaguely appealing", the sound effects were better appreciated. However, Boardman of Raze considered the music "a little boring".

Critics cited the fast gameplay, unprecedented in platformers. The difficulty was disputed, described as "impossible" by Rand and "average" by EGM. Rand said about the gameplay in general that it "plays like a dream"; according to GameZone it would enchant players for hours, and Boogie Man praised Sonic Team's ability to provide an engaging experience primarily from running and jumping. Although EGM, Dragon, Paul of Mean Machines, and Boardman of Raze praised the level design (especially the hidden rooms), Paul found losing all of one's rings frustrating.

Bob Strauss of Entertainment Weekly gave the game an A+ and wrote that it was a very fast game, yet never felt chaotic or impossible, and they later named it the best game available in 1991.

=== Awards ===
At the 1991 Golden Joystick Awards, Sonic the Hedgehog won Overall Game of the Year. In the 1991 Electronic Gaming Monthly awards, Sonic the Hedgehog won Game of the Year. At the European Computer Trade Show (ECTS) awards, it won the awards for Best Video Game and Going Live Viewers Award. In 1992, Mega ranked Sonic as their third-favorite Genesis game. In 1995, Flux rated the game fourth in its "Top 100 Video Games". In 1996, GamesMaster ranked the game 78th on their "Top 100 Games of All Time". In 2016, The Strong National Museum of Play inducted Sonic the Hedgehog to its World Video Game Hall of Fame.

=== Retrospective reviews ===
Retrospective reception

Aggregate scores
Aggregator	Score					
Aggregator	3DS	GBA	iOS	Sega Genesis	Wii	Xbox 360
GameRankings	N/A	32.50%	70%	86%	N/A	N/A
Metacritic	81/100	33/100	N/A	N/A	N/A	77/100

Review scores
Publication	Score					
Publication	3DS	GBA	iOS	Sega Genesis	Wii	Xbox 360
Eurogamer	N/A	N/A	N/A	N/A	N/A	9/10
GameSpot	N/A	2.5/10	N/A	N/A	7.3/10	N/A
IGN	N/A	N/A	N/A	N/A	8/10	N/A
Nintendo Life	N/A	N/A	N/A	N/A	8/10	N/A

Award
Publication	Award
Electronic Gaming Monthly (EGM)	10th Most Important Game

Retrospective reception has been positive, with an 86% rating at the review aggregator GameRankings based on nine reviews published online in the 2000s. Sonic the Hedgehog has maintained its popularity, and has since been considered one of the greatest video games of all time.

Frank Provo of GameSpot described the game as "one of the best platformers of all time", finding that despite technical issues in the Game Boy Advance port "after all these years, the underlying graphics, audio, and gameplay still hold up". Lucas M. Thomas of IGN agreed that it stood the test of time. Writing in The Guardian, Keith Stuart observed that Sonic the Hedgehog's emphasis on speed and pinball mechanics dramatically departs from generally accepted precepts of game design, requiring that players "learn through repetition rather than observation" as "the levels aren't designed to be seen or even understood in one playthrough." However, Stuart concluded that "sometimes in Sonic, when you get better, or through sheer luck, things take off, every jump is right, every loop-the-loop is perfect, and you're in the flow, sailing above the game's strange structure ... Sonic is incorrect game design and yet ... it's a masterpiece."

== Legacy ==
Primarily because of its Genesis bundling, Sonic the Hedgehog was a factor in popularising the console in North America, thus solidifying Sega as a competitor to Nintendo and their Super Nintendo Entertainment System. During October–December 1991, with the game's success, the Genesis outsold the SNES by two to one; at its January 1992 peak it gained a foothold in the industry and had 65 percent of the market for 16-bit consoles. Although Nintendo eventually overtook Sega, it was the first time since December 1985 that Nintendo did not lead the console market.

Sonic the Hedgehog inspired similar platformers starring animal mascots, including Bubsy, Aero the Acro-Bat, James Pond 3, Earthworm Jim, Zero the Kamikaze Squirrel, and Radical Rex. "Animal with attitude" games carried over to the next generation of consoles, with Naughty Dog's Crash Bandicoot and Crystal Dynamics's Gex citing Sonic as a major inspiration.

Sonic's success led to an extensive media franchise, with the first of many sequels, Sonic the Hedgehog 2, released the following year. It has generated dozens of additional games and a large cast of recurring characters, keeping Sonic and Robotnik (later renamed as Eggman) mainstays, and continued beyond Sega's exit from the console industry after the Dreamcast. The series has ventured from platformers to fighting, racing, role-playing, and sports games, and also expanded into anime, manga, cartoons comic books, novels, and toys. Sonic the Hedgehog is one of the best-selling video game franchises of all time, with over 140 million copies sold or downloaded worldwide across consoles, PC's, mobile phones, and tablets by May 2014. The game's first level, Green Hill Zone, has been featured in later games such as Sonic Adventure 2, Sonic Generations, Sonic Mania, Sonic Forces, and the Super Smash Bros. series.

The game inspired a number of unofficial variants, including Somari, a pirated Nintendo Entertainment System conversion featuring Nintendo's Mario character in levels from the original Sonic game, Sonic the Hedgehog Megamix, a total conversion mod of the original game, and Sonic 1 Boomed, a ROM hack which implements Sonic's redesign from the Sonic Boom animated series.

An incomplete prototype build of the game was leaked and released by Hidden Palace on January 1, 2021.
