= Sonic the Hedgehog 2 =

1992 video game

- North American cover art by Greg Martin
- Developer: Sega Technical Institute
- Publisher: Sega
- Director: Masaharu Yoshii
- Producer: Shinobu Toyoda
- Designers: Hirokazu Yasuhara; Yutaka Sugano
- Programmer: Yuji Naka
- Artist: Yasushi Yamaguchi
- Composer: Masato Nakamura
- Series: Sonic the Hedgehog
- Platform: Sega Genesis: Arcade, Android, iOS, Apple TV, mobile phone (J2ME), Nintendo 3DS, Nintendo Switch
- Release: November 21, 1992: Genesis; JP: November 21, 1992; WW: November 24, 1992 Arcade; WW: 1993 J2ME; WW: April 2008 Android, iOS; WW: December 12, 2013 Nintendo 3DS; JP: July 22, 2015; WW: October 8, 2015 Switch; JP: February 13, 2020; WW: February 20, 2020
- Genre: Platform
- Modes: Single-player, multiplayer

Sonic the Hedgehog 2 (Note: Japanese: ソニック・ザ・ヘッジホッグ2(ツー), Hepburn: Sonikku za Hejjihoggu Tsū) is a 1992 platform game developed by Sega Technical Institute (STI) for the Sega Genesis. Players control Sonic as he attempts to stop Doctor Robotnik from stealing the Chaos Emeralds to power his space station, the Death Egg. Like the first Sonic the Hedgehog (1991), players traverse side-scrolling levels at high speeds while collecting rings, defeating enemies, and fighting bosses. Sonic 2 introduces Sonic's sidekick Miles "Tails" Prower and features faster gameplay, larger levels, a multiplayer mode, and special stages featuring pre-rendered 3D graphics.

After Sonic the Hedgehog greatly increased the popularity of the Genesis in North America, Sega directed STI's founder, Mark Cerny, to start Sonic 2 in November 1991. Members of Sonic Team—including the programmer Yuji Naka and the designer Hirokazu Yasuhara—moved from Japan to California to join the project. Sonic 2 was intended to be faster and more ambitious than the first game. The development suffered setbacks, including cultural differences between the Japanese and American staff, and numerous levels were cut due to time constraints and quality concerns. As with the first game, Masato Nakamura, a member of the J-pop band Dreams Come True, composed the soundtrack.

Sonic 2 was widely anticipated, and Sega backed it with an aggressive $10 million marketing campaign. It was released in November 1992 to acclaim and received numerous year-end accolades, including two Golden Joystick Awards. Critics considered Sonic 2 an improvement over the first game and praised the visuals, level design, gameplay, and music, but criticized the low difficulty level and similarities to its predecessor. Sonic 2 grossed over $450 million and sold six million copies by 2006, making it the second-bestselling Genesis game behind the original Sonic the Hedgehog.

Sonic 2 solidified Sonic as a major franchise and helped keep Sega competitive during the console wars of the 16-bit era in the early 1990s. It continues to receive acclaim and is considered one of the greatest video games. Sonic the Hedgehog 3 and Sonic & Knuckles followed in 1994. Sonic 2 has been rereleased on various platforms via compilations and emulation; a remake was released for Android and iOS in 2013 and ported to consoles in the compilation Sonic Origins in 2022. A number of Sonic 2 prototypes have leaked since the release; the first, discovered in 1999, played a significant role in the development of a game datamining community.

== Gameplay ==
Sonic and Tails jumping across pillars in Aquatic Ruin Zone, the game’s third zone

Sonic the Hedgehog 2 is a side-scrolling platform game. It features a story similar to the first Sonic the Hedgehog: Doctor Robotnik, a mad scientist, seeks the Chaos Emeralds to power his space station, the Death Egg, and traps the animal inhabitants of West Side Island in aggressive robots. As Sonic the Hedgehog, the player embarks on a journey to collect the Chaos Emeralds and stop Robotnik. The player character can run, jump, crouch, and attack by curling into a ball. Sonic 2 introduces the spin dash, which allows the player to curl while stationary for a speed boost, and Miles "Tails" Prower, a fox with two tails who acts as Sonic's sidekick. In the default single-player game mode, the player controls Sonic and Tails simultaneously; a second player can join in at any time and control Tails separately. The player can also choose to play as Sonic or Tails individually.

The game takes place across 11 zones with 20 levels ("acts"). The acts are larger than the first game's, and the player navigates them at high speeds while jumping between platforms, defeating robot enemies, and avoiding obstacles. Springs, slopes, bottomless pits, and vertical loops fill acts, as do hazards like water and spikes. The player passes checkpoints to save progress. The last act of each zone ends with a boss battle against Robotnik. Sonic 2 features twice as many unique level themes compared to the first game, and most zones end after two acts rather than three.

The player collects golden rings as a form of health: if they have at least one ring when they collide with an enemy or obstacle, they will survive, but their rings will scatter and blink before disappearing. The player starts with three lives, which they lose if they are hit without a ring, fall down a pit, get crushed, drown, or reach the 10-minute time limit; they receive a game over if they run out. Power-ups like shields and invincibility provide additional layers of protection, and lives are replenished by collecting 100 rings or a 1-up.

The special stages, in which the player collects rings to obtain a Chaos Emerald, are presented in 3D, unlike the rest of the game.

If the player passes a checkpoint with 50 or more rings, they can warp to a special stage for an opportunity to collect one of the seven Chaos Emeralds. The player runs through a half-pipe course, collecting rings, and dodging bombs. A set number of rings must be collected to obtain the emerald. If the player collides with a bomb, they lose ten rings and are immobilized momentarily. The stages rise in difficulty and the player cannot enter any stage without passing the previous one. After finishing, the player is transported back to the star post they used to enter, with their ring count reset. When all the Chaos Emeralds have been collected, Sonic can transform into Super Sonic by collecting 50 rings. Super Sonic is nearly invincible, runs faster, and jumps farther, but loses one ring per second and reverts to normal when his rings are depleted.

Sonic 2 introduces a multiplayer game mode where two players compete against each other in a split-screen race across three levels. After one player finishes a level, the other player must finish within a minute. Players are ranked in five areas (score, time, rings held at the end of the level, total rings collected, and the number of item boxes broken). The player who excels in the most categories wins. Players can also compete to obtain the most rings in the special stages.

=== Knuckles in Sonic 2 ===
Sonic & Knuckles was released in 1994. The Sonic & Knuckles game cartridge features a "lock-on" adapter that allows players to insert other Sega Genesis cartridges. Attaching Sonic 2 unlocks Knuckles the Echidna in Sonic the Hedgehog 2, a variation of Sonic 2 in which the player controls Knuckles the Echidna, a character introduced in Sonic the Hedgehog 3 (1994). The levels are identical, but Knuckles can glide and climb walls, allowing him access to areas inaccessible to Sonic or Tails. However, he cannot jump as high, making some areas, such as certain boss fights, more difficult.

== Development ==
=== Conception ===
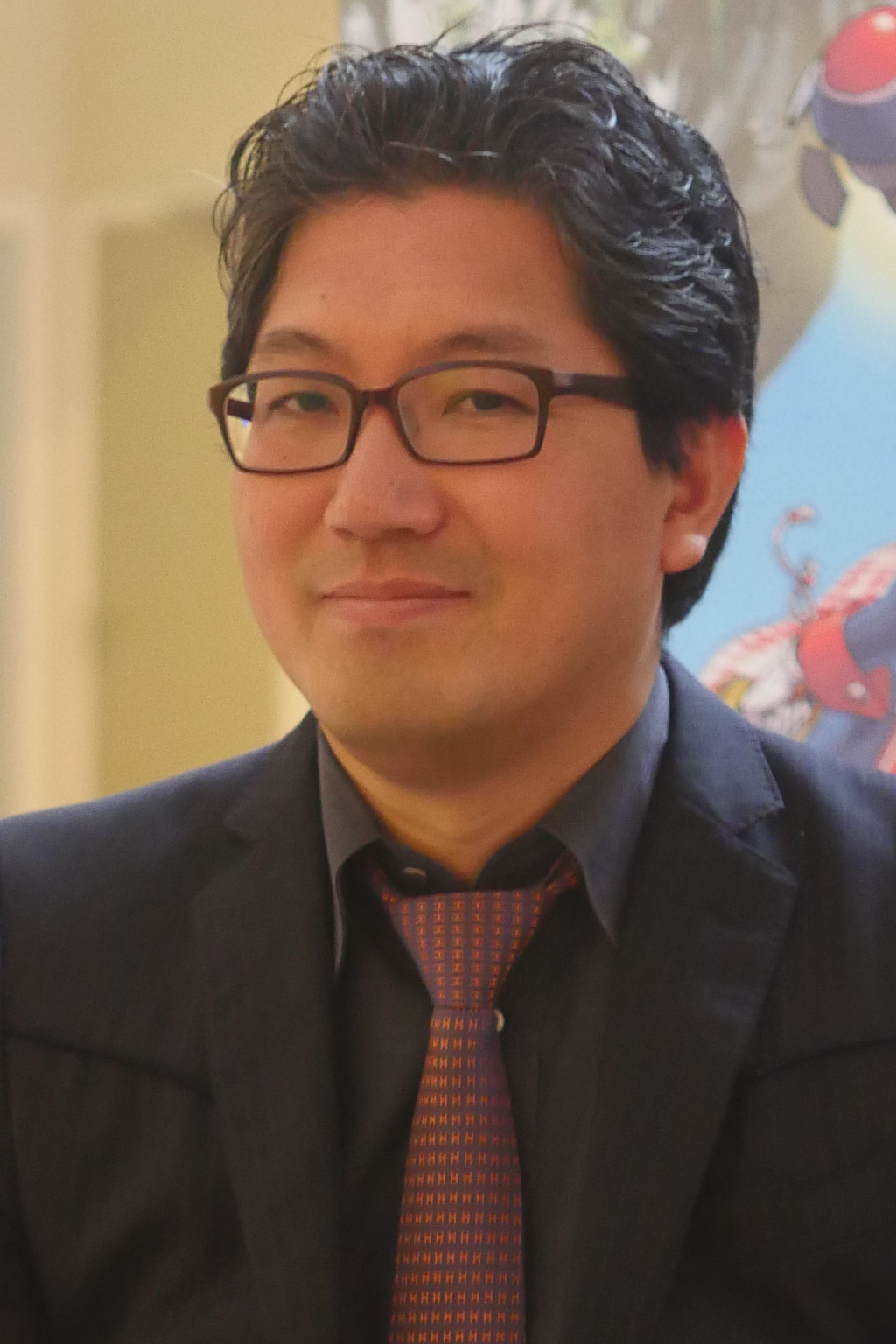
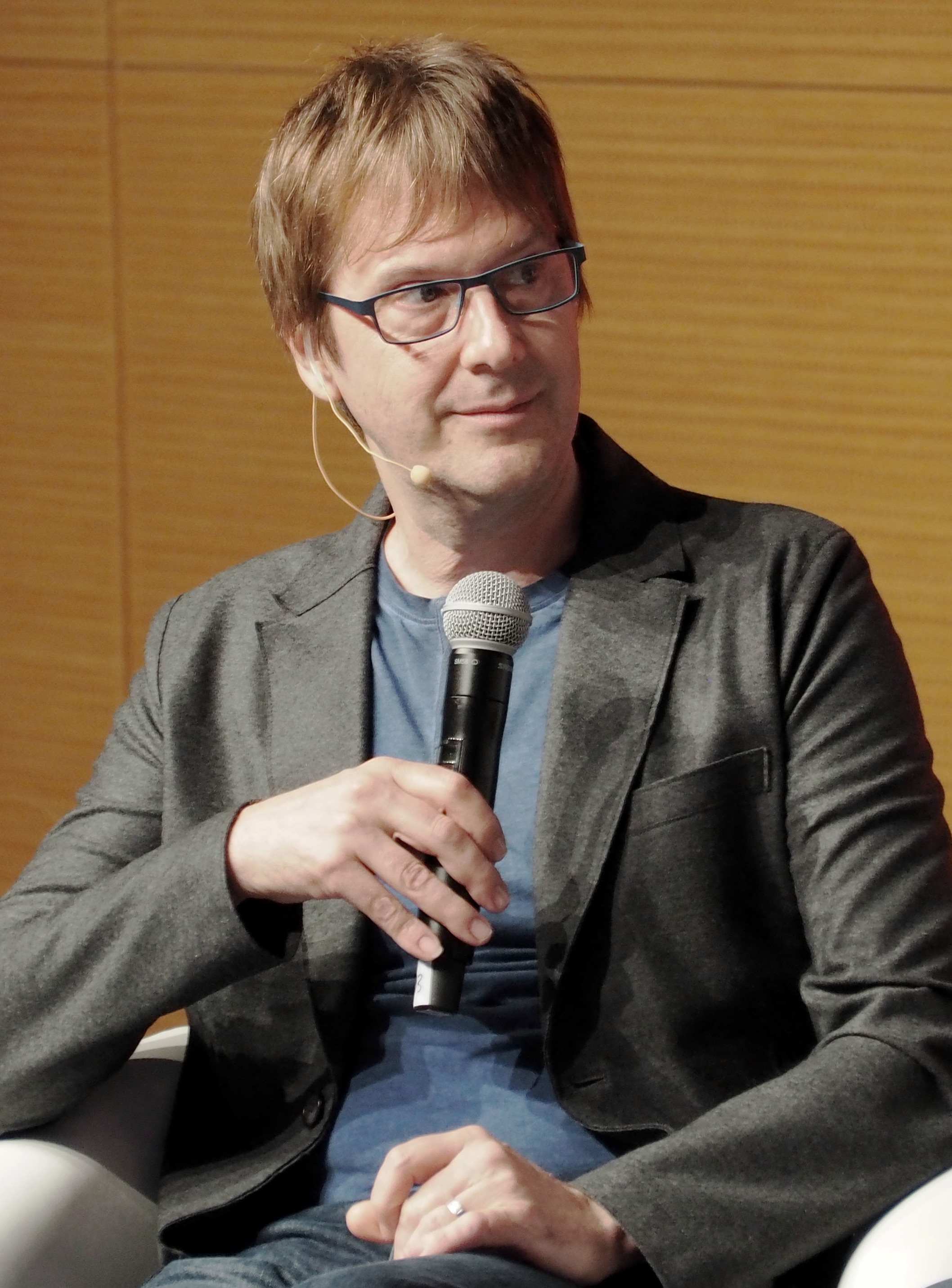
Sonic the Hedgehog 2 programmer Yuji Naka (left) and STI founder Mark Cerny (right)

The original Sonic the Hedgehog was published by Sega for the Sega Genesis in June 1991. It was developed by Sonic Team, led by the programmer Yuji Naka, the artist Naoto Ohshima, and the designer Hirokazu Yasuhara. Sonic greatly increased the Genesis's popularity in North America and is credited with helping Sega gain 65% of the market share against then-industry leader Nintendo, making Sega a formidable competitor. After the release, the team disbanded: Naka quit Sega due to disagreements over his salary, dissatisfaction over the time and effort it had taken to finish Sonic, and a lack of support from management, while Yasuhara moved to America to join Mark Cerny's California-based Sega Technical Institute (STI).

Cerny had established STI during the development of Sonic the Hedgehog because Sega wanted to develop more games in America. His aim was to establish an elite studio that would combine the design philosophies of American and Japanese developers. During a trip to Japan, Cerny visited Naka's apartment, listened to the reasons why he left, and convinced him to join STI in America to fix the problems he had with Sega in Japan. Other members of the Sonic development team joined Naka. Ohshima stayed in Japan to work on Sonic CD (1993), so Yasushi Yamaguchi replaced him.

In September 1991, Cerny pitched Sonic the Hedgehog 2 as STI's project for the 1992 Christmas and holiday shopping season—giving the team 11 months of development—but Sega of America considered it too soon for a sequel and was still unconfident in the Sonic character. Cerny was not surprised since he believed the marketing executives who controlled game development did not understand the process. STI explored other concepts, but in November, Sega reversed course and told Cerny that it needed Sonic 2 for the 1992 holiday season. Cerny said that this did not cost STI any game ideas since they had yet to come up with one on par with Sonic, but they lost two months of development.

Now with a nine-month schedule, full-scale development started in early 1992. Sonic 2's development team was much larger than the first game's and consisted of both American and Japanese developers, although the majority of the team was Japanese. Cerny's idea was to have around a dozen of the original game's staff move to STI. Development began with only Americans because the Japanese faced immigration problems. According to Cerny, Sega had applied for O-1 expert visas, for "nationally or internationally recognized" people with "a record of extraordinary achievement", unaware that the Japanese developers did not qualify.

=== Design ===
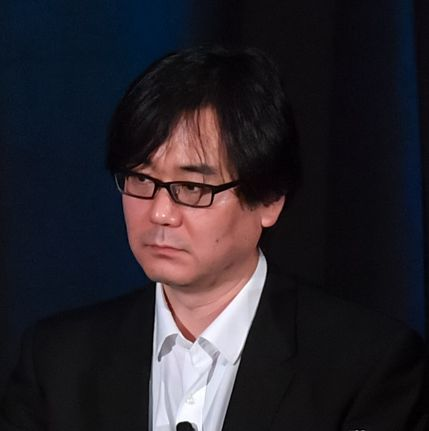
Sonic 2 designer Hirokazu Yasuhara in 2018

Sega of America's marketing director, Al Nilsen, said that STI wanted "to go all out" to ensure Sonic 2 would be as successful as the original Sonic, since sequels were generally not well regarded. STI brainstormed various ideas to improve the first game's formula, beginning with making Sonic faster. In the first game, the developers limited Sonic with a cap that prevented players from running at his maximum possible speed; STI lifted the cap for Sonic 2. Naka conceived the spin dash to remove the need to backtrack for momentum, which he observed was a common criticism of the first game.

STI's first step was to create a game outline for the developers to flesh out with "a book-length report" detailing the characters, story, and levels. Yasuhara had ambitious plans for Sonic 2 and designed it with "'blue sky' ideas". Assuming STI had two years of development, he conceived a plot in which Robotnik took over the world and Sonic used time travel to stop him. Yasuhara's concept featured a world map that would change in every time period and provide access to different levels. The idea was cut as it required too many levels and too much development time. Hill Top Zone, which features dinosaur enemies, was conceived as a past version of Green Hill Zone from Sonic 1, while Chemical Plant and Casino Night came from the Robotnik-ruled future.

Yasuhara designed the stages thinking in the context of a 3D world to work out elements such as corkscrew loops and pipes. He was inspired to design Casino Night because he found Sonic's springs similar to the gimmicks of pinball tables, while Sky Chase—which features Sonic riding a biplane as he attempts to reach Robotnik's base—was inspired by Hayao Miyazaki's anime Future Boy Conan (1978). The first game demo was playable around six or seven months after the initial outline's creation and featured a few levels without sound effects or significant detail. STI assembled focus groups to play the demo for feedback and created the alpha build afterward; by this point, 80% of programming had been finished.

Yasuhara wanted to add a second playable character so siblings could play together. Naka suggested the second character be endearing, similar to the kitsune from Urusei Yatsura, and beginner-oriented rather than Sonic's rival. An internal contest was held to determine the new character, and the winning design was Yamaguchi's fox, which he named Miles Prower (a pun on "miles per hour"). STI wanted the character to appeal to Japanese audiences, and Yamaguchi gave him two tails—inspired by the Phantasy Star (1987) character Myau—to make the design more impactful. He based Sonic and Tails' relationship on that of the Dragon Ball characters Piccolo and Gohan. Sega of America felt the name "Miles Prower" would not sell and suggested "Tails" as an alternative. Nilsen developed a character backstory to convince the developers to make the change; they compromised by making Tails his nickname.

Tails was implemented using an artificial intelligence routine that allowed him to mimic Sonic's movements. He was also used in the multiplayer mode, something that Naka had attempted to implement late in development of the original Sonic. The multiplayer mode was one of Naka's primary motivations to develop Sonic 2, since he felt multiplayer games were more fun. Naka created split-screen gameplay with the Genesis' rarely used interlaced mode, since he found the standard display mode made it difficult to see the player characters. Developing the multiplayer mode took six months.

=== Art direction ===
In addition to overseeing the level design and gameplay, Cerny acted as an art director. The initial level maps were drawn at Sega's headquarters in Tokyo. According to the level artist Craig Stitt, the artists received the paper map with ideas regarding the level theme. Once the design was settled, the artist would draw the art pixel by pixel and then input the graphics in the game itself. The graphics and animations were implemented using the Digitizer, Sega's proprietary graphics system for the Genesis. The artists had to deal with palette limitations, as only 64 colors could be displayed on-screen. Rieko Kodama, who worked on the first game as an artist, helped design the levels.

Yasuhara said meshing the Americans' art with art by Yamaguchi was the development's largest hurdle. Yamaguchi had to check the teams' enemy and stage designs while producing his own. Stitt called Yamaguchi, who mostly worked alone, "a machine" who spent hours reworking other artists' levels repeatedly to ensure quality. For example, Stitt felt disappointed when Yamaguchi redid his background art for the Oil Ocean level, but did not argue because he was not satisfied with the original background and Yamaguchi's was much better. The title screen and Casino Night level art were both completely reworked shortly before release.

Tim Skelly designed the appearance of the pseudo-3D special stages, based on a tech demo created by Naka. The special stages, designed by the Shinobi (1987) director Yutaka Sugano, were created from pre-rendered 3D polygons, video of which was compressed and halved vertically and horizontally to fit in the game cartridge. Cerny said the developers chose the 3D look to make the stages appear extravagant. In retrospect, he felt the stages were visually impressive but did not have as much gameplay depth as the original Sonic's special stages, which featured Sonic navigating a rotating maze.

=== Conflicts and cut content ===
The development was complicated by the cultural and language barriers between the Japanese and American developers. The Japanese were used to crunch conditions, with Cerny noting they often worked through the night and slept in their cubicles. In contrast, the Americans locked the STI offices at night. Cerny had envisioned the Japanese acting as mentors to the Americans, but the language barrier made cooperation difficult. Stitt recalled Yasuhara as easy to work with, but Naka as "an arrogant pain in the ass" uninterested in working with Americans. Skelly said that Naka would have been happier working with an all-Japanese team.

A screenshot of Hidden Palace Zone, one of the cut Sonic 2 levels. It featured extensively in prerelease advertisements and was restored in the 2013 Sonic 2 remake.

During development, Cerny left STI. He said that he left as development concluded, though the Sega executive Masaharu Yoshii recalled that he departed around halfway through. Cerny left partly because of the rising tensions between the Japanese and American developers, feeling the Americans were not treated respectfully. Further complicating this was STI's involvement with the Sonic franchise and Naka's desire to oversee development personally, as well as Sega of America's initial hesitation to assist given their lack of confidence in the Sonic character. Yoshii was installed as the temporary head of STI and was credited as Sonic 2's director. He said that the situation was severe because Sega of America was "betting everything" on Sonic 2, but the STI staff did not display any stress and remained optimistic that the project would be finished.

A large amount of content was cut, mostly due to time constraints. Nilsen said Sonic 2 "probably could have been three times the size if we left in everything that was there. Naka and team... weren't afraid to say, 'I've been working on this for four months, it's not working. Let's take it out.'" One cut stage, Hidden Palace Zone, featured extensively in prerelease advertisements. It was planned as a secret stage accessed by collecting Chaos Emeralds; according to Naka, it would explain the origin of the Chaos Emeralds and grant Sonic his Super Sonic powers. Stitt created the Hidden Palace art and considered its foreground among his favorite work. Though Hidden Palace was one of the first levels implemented, work on it stopped in mid-1992, and it was removed shortly before completion for a lack of time and cartridge space.

Other cut levels included a forest level, Wood Zone, which was implemented but hardly worked on, and a desert level. One cut level, Genocide City, was renamed Cyber City because the Japanese developers had not understood the connotations of the word genocide. Its level layout was used in the Metropolis Zone level. The Sega of America CEO Tom Kalinske, the product manager Madeline Schroeder, and Nilsen worked closely with STI; Nilsen said the feedback loop helped the team determine what needed to be cut. Most cuts were made to the Americans' designs, and many were furious when they learned their work had been cut. One artist, Brenda Cook, had all three levels she worked on cut. Stitt said that he may have been the only American whose art was used in the final game.

=== Music ===
As with the first game, Sonic 2's soundtrack was composed by Masato Nakamura, a member of the J-pop band Dreams Come True. Nakamura had become famous in Japan and increased his asking price considerably. According to Yamaguchi, Sega of America wanted to use music composed in-house instead. After the team rejected it as "awful", Sega rehired Nakamura. Nakamura began composing early in development with only concept art for reference. He treated Sonic 2 like a film and attempted to reflect the atmosphere he felt in the concept art. Nakamura composed Sonic 2 simultaneously with the 1992 Dreams Come True album The Swinging Star. As a gift to the developers, he produced an alternate version of the Sonic 2 ending theme, "Sweet Sweet Sweet", for the album.

Since Sonic 2 was more technically advanced than its predecessor, Nakamura "wanted to create music that showed progress... It was like the Indiana Jones sequels. Same concept, but with more fun and excitement." Nakamura felt considerable pressure, as he understood that expectations were high due to the first game's success. STI let Nakamura work freely, which he felt allowed him to create melodic tunes and unusual rhythms. He composed using a Roland MC-4 Microcomposer; composing was challenging due to the Genesis' limited sound capabilities, but this encouraged him to be more inventive. Five or six people worked to convert Nakamura's music to the Genesis format.

=== Completion ===
Sonic 2 did not become playable from start to finish until the last 48 hours of development, in September 1992. The team planned to use a 4 Mbit cartridge, the same cartridge size as the first game, but STI ran out of space towards the end of development. To make sure the game would be finished in time for Thanksgiving, Yoshii went to the Japanese side of Sega for help. Managing director Daizaburou Sakurai contacted Sega Enterprises president Hayao Nakayama, who allowed the team to double the ROM size to avoid a delay. In total, over 100 people worked on Sonic 2 and the main team comprised 20 developers. The development schedule was shorter than the first game's, and Yasuhara said STI worked under a lot of pressure due to Sega's competition with Nintendo.

Yoshii said that Sonic 2 would not have been ready for release without Sega of America's bug-checking process. STI videotaped testers' gameplay so the developers could easily locate bugs. Around 50 developers worked as bug checkers, and the process took two to three weeks. Yoshii felt that despite the staff conflicts, the bug-checking made developing Sonic 2 in the US worth it, as Sega of America's process was much more thorough than the one in Japan. One of the bug testers was Takashi Iizuka, who undertook the work as part of his new employee training. When Sonic 2 was shipped to Japan for production, copies of the source code were sent on separate planes to ensure that the game would arrive in case of an accident. On the day the code shipped, the STI staff gathered in the warehouse and celebrated with a Sonic-themed cake.

== Release ==
=== Marketing ===
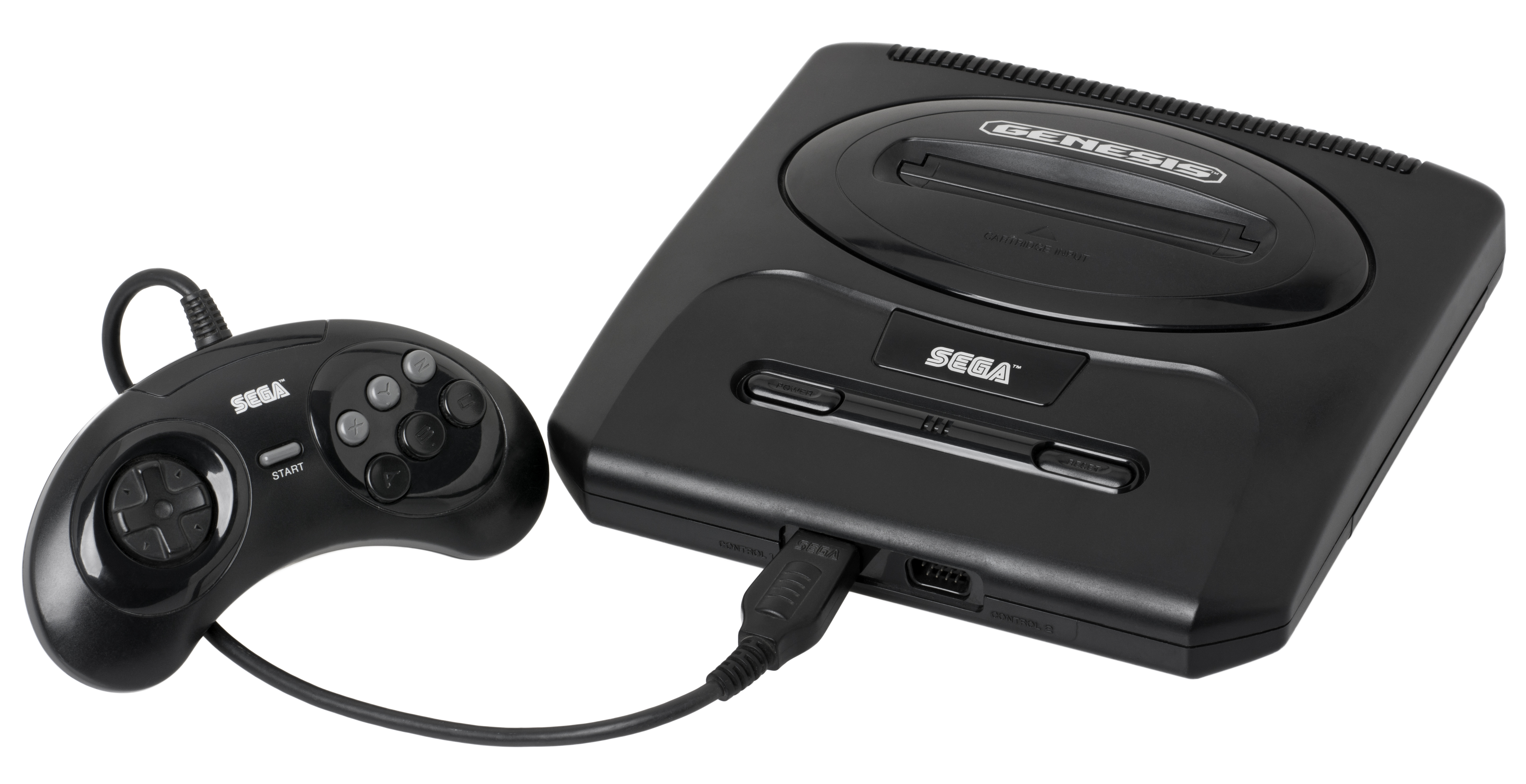
Sonic the Hedgehog 2 was released for the Sega Genesis (pictured) in November 1992, accompanied by a $10 million marketing campaign.

Sega aggressively promoted Sonic the Hedgehog 2, spending approximately $10 million on advertising. Promotion began in early 1992, when Sega sent mockup screenshots to magazines. An early version appeared on the Nickelodeon game show Nick Arcade several times, including in a competition between Clarissa Explains It All stars Melissa Joan Hart and Jason Zimbler. Hart, who was a fan of the first game, struggled to play it since she was unaware of the spin dash. The prototype was shown at a press event during the Consumer Electronics Show in May 1992, and in the 1992 Tokyo Toy Show.

As Sonic 2 was Sega's biggest game of 1992, its marketing team, as Game Informer wrote, sought to make the release "as much a celebration as it was a product launch". Sega gave away T-shirts as preorder gifts and sent stores dry-erase boards to count down the days to release. Teaser posters bore the slogan "Are You Up 2 It?". Sega of America collaborated with Emery Worldwide to produce stickers celebrating the "Great Sonic 2 Shipment", and 50 people dressed as Sonic greeted the three planes carrying copies of Sonic 2 at Heathrow Airport. Sega considered shipping the cartridges with holographic labels, but decided it was too expensive.

At the last moment, Sega canceled a tour of shopping malls across the US, deciding it would be inadequate. Instead, it made Sonic 2 available in the West in all stores on the same day. This was an unusual practice at the time; generally, international game release dates depended on the region. Sega reconfigured its distribution system and used air shipping to ensure that copies were available in all major stores. The North American and European release date, Tuesday, November 24, 1992, was marketed as "Sonic 2sday". In Japan, Sonic 2 was released on November 21 the same year. Initial copies had several bugs; later copies used a patch developed a few days after completion. The Western cover art was illustrated by Greg Martin, while the Japanese cover art was illustrated by Akira Watanabe.

=== Sales ===
The extensive Sonic 2sday marketing campaign contributed to strong initial sales for Sonic 2. In the US, it sold 400,000 copies within a week. In the UK, it sold 750,000 copies within a week, accounting for 48% of all UK software and becoming the UK's fastest-selling game at the time. It was the top-seller on Gallup's Sega charts for the UK, Japan, and the US for months. Sonic 2 grossed $450 million in 1992, and sold six million copies worldwide by August 2006, making it the second-bestselling Genesis game behind the original Sonic the Hedgehog.

== Reception ==
Reception

Review scores
Publication	Score
Computer and Video Games	94%
Electronic Gaming Monthly	8/10, 8/10, 9/10, 10/10
Famitsu	7/10, 8/10, 8/10, 7/10
GameFan	98.5% (Note: Diehard GameFan's reviewers provided two scores of 98% and 99%.)
GamesMaster	65%
Mean Machines Sega	96%
Electronic Games	91%
Mega	94%
Beep! Mega Drive	9/10

Awards
Publication	Award
Chicago Tribune	Best Game of the Year (runner-up)
Electronic Gaming Awards	Video Game of the Year (nomination), Best Electronic Game Graphics
Electronic Gaming Monthly (EGM)	Best Game of the Year (Genesis)
Golden Joystick Awards	Best Original Console Game, Promotional Campaign of the Year

Sonic the Hedgehog 2 received acclaim. Numerous critics considered it better than the first Sonic. (Note: Attributed to multiple references: CVG, Electronic Games, GamePro, Mean Machines, Mega, and Beep! Mega Drive) Electronic Gaming Monthly (EGM) wrote that it could "best be described with a lot of 2s", being twice as long and fun as its predecessor. Reviewers noted Sonic 2 was similar to Sonic the Hedgehog in appearance and gameplay. The similarities did not bother Electronic Games, which said the level variety and multiplayer made it an improvement, but Mega and GamesMaster considered them a detriment. In particular, GamesMaster felt that Sonic 2 was just more of Sonic the Hedgehog and did not improve much.

Critics commended the presentation, (Note: Attributed to multiple references: CVG, GamePro, Electronic Games, Mega, EGM, and Beep! Mega Drive) with EGM describing Sonic 2 as an impressive showcase of the Genesis hardware. The visuals were praised as colorful and detailed, and EGM and Mega highlighted the backgrounds for their intricacy. GamePro, Mean Machines Sega, and Mega wrote that the updated sprites were larger and better animated. Mean Machines said Sonic's new animation frames made for a smoother appearance. Several critics said the graphics were better than the first game's, (Note: Attributed to multiple references: GamePro, EGM, Mean Machines, and Mega) though Computer and Video Games (CVG) and GamesMaster felt they were about the same. CVG said this was not a problem since Sonic's graphics were already excellent. The music was also commended, (Note: Attributed to multiple references: CVG, GamePro, EGM, Electronic Games, Mega) though CVG said it was not as memorable as the first game's and GamePro found it less impressive than the visuals.

Reviewers enjoyed the level design and gameplay. (Note: Attributed to multiple references: CVG, GameFan, GamePro, and Electronic Games) Critics said Sonic 2's levels were larger and featured more variety than the first game, (Note: Attributed to multiple references: CVG, GameFan, GamePro, and Mega) which CVG and GamePro wrote incentivized exploration and replayability. Mean Machines and Mega said it was clear that Sega sought to address the criticisms levied against the first game regarding its length and low difficulty, though Sonic 2's easiness was still criticized. Mega and GamesMaster wrote that despite Sonic 2's larger size, it could still be completed fairly quickly, and one of GamesMaster's reviewers said they finished it in one sitting without receiving a single game over. CVG said the difficulty was Sonic 2's only major problem, but GamePro and Mega said the difficulty was remedied by the replay value that the levels' branching paths and various secrets provided. Critics considered the special stages a highlight, (Note: Attributed to multiple references: GamePro, GamesMaster, Mean Machines, and CVG) though Mega felt they lacked the skill curve of the first game's.

Reviewers called the multiplayer mode one of Sonic 2's best additions, (Note: Attributed to multiple references: GamePro, EGM, GamesMaster, Electronic Games, Mean Machines, and Mega) though some disliked the split-screen effect. Reviewers in Weekly Famicom Tsūshin found that playing in two-player mode was the most fun, but also the most difficult as it split up the screen making already small sprites even harder to see. Mega said that the ability to race against a friend rather than just the in-game timer added substantial depth, and EGM said it would double the amount of fun players would have. Multiple critics praised Tails, (Note: Attributed to multiple references: CVG, GameFan, GamePro, and Mega) with GamePro and Beep! Mega Drive calling him cute. Conversely, GamesMaster said Tails was briefly fun but ultimately little more than a sprite-swapped Sonic. Reviews in Weekly Famitsu questioned why he was in the game and said he was not cute enough.

=== Accolades ===
Sonic 2 received numerous year-end accolades and nominations. It received the Golden Joystick Awards for Best Original Console Game and Promotional Campaign of the Year, and was a runner-up for the Chicago Tribune's Best Game of the Year award after The Legend of Zelda: A Link to the Past (1991) and the console version of Street Fighter II (1992). EGM named it the best Genesis game of 1992. At Electronic Games' Electronic Gaming Awards, it won Best Electronic Game Graphics but lost the Video Game of the Year award to Street Fighter II.

== Post-release ==
Naka refused to develop another Sonic game if he had to work with the Americans again. When Atari veteran Roger Hector became the division's head, STI split into two teams: the Japanese developers led by Naka, and the American developers. The Japanese team started working on Sonic the Hedgehog 3 in January 1993; it was conceived as an isometric game that used the Sega Virtua Processor chip, but was retooled to reuse the Sonic 2 game engine after it became apparent that the chip would not be finished in time. Many of Sonic 2's unused concepts were incorporated into Sonic 3 and the next game, Sonic & Knuckles, including the Hidden Palace level. Like their predecessors, Sonic 3 and Sonic & Knuckles were critical and commercial successes when they were released in 1994.

While the Japanese worked on Sonic 3, the American team developed the spin-off Sonic Spinball (1993), a pinball game commissioned after Sega's research determined that Casino Night Zone was one of the most popular levels in Sonic 2. Following the completion of Sonic & Knuckles, Naka returned to Japan with Iizuka to work with Sonic Team, and was reunited with Ohshima. Yasuhara, citing differences with Naka, stayed to develop games for Sega of America. A concept developed during Sonic 2's production formed the basis of the Sonic Team game Nights into Dreams, released for the Sega Saturn in 1996. The American team developed Comix Zone (1995), The Ooze (1995), Die Hard Arcade (1996) with Sega AM1, and Sonic X-treme, which was canceled in 1996. STI was disbanded in late 1996 as a result of changes in management at Sega of America. Meanwhile, Cerny worked with Sony Interactive Entertainment and helped create the PlayStation franchises Crash Bandicoot and Spyro. Cerny and Yasuhara remained friends and reunited to work with Naughty Dog on the Jak and Daxter series in the 2000s.

=== Other media ===
An alternate version of Sonic the Hedgehog 2 was developed by Sega and Aspect for Sega's 8-bit consoles, the Master System and the handheld Game Gear. The 8-bit version features different levels and music, as well as a different plot in which Sonic must rescue a kidnapped Tails. It was later included in Sonic compilations, such as Sonic Adventure DX: Director's Cut (2003) for the GameCube and Windows and Sonic Gems Collection (2005) for the GameCube and PlayStation 2. Sega released an arcade cabinet version of Sonic 2 using its Sega Mega Play arcade system board in 1993. Another version planned for the Sega CD was replaced by Sonic CD.

In October 2011, Sega released Sonic the Hedgehog 1&2 Soundtrack, a three-disc album compiling music from Sonic the Hedgehog and Sonic 2, interviews with Naka and Nakamura, and concept art. The first disc contains the in-game tracks and the second contains Nakamura's demo recordings produced during development. The third disc contains "Sweet Sweet Sweet" by Dreams Come True, its English-language version "Sweet Dream", and remixes of both songs that Akon produced for Sonic the Hedgehog (2006).

=== Rereleases ===
Sonic 2 has been ported to multiple platforms. A Sega Saturn port included in the compilation Sonic Jam (1997) introduces an alternate difficulty mode that alters stage layouts and removes some levels for an easier experience. Other compilations featuring the game include Sonic Classics 3 in 1 (1995) for the Genesis; Sonic Mega Collection (2002) for the GameCube, Sonic Mega Collection Plus (2004) for the PlayStation 2 and Xbox, Sega Genesis Collection (2006) for the PlayStation 2 and PlayStation Portable; Sonic's Ultimate Genesis Collection (2009) for the Xbox 360 and PlayStation 3; Sonic Classic Collection (2010) for the Nintendo DS; and Sega Genesis Classics (2018) for the Nintendo Switch, PlayStation 4, and Xbox One. Jam, Mega Collection, Mega Collection Plus, and Classic Collection include Knuckles in Sonic 2 as a bonus.

Glu Mobile released a two-part mobile phone port in April 2008 for Java devices. A remake of Sonic 2 was released for Android and iOS devices on December 12, 2013, and for Apple TV on March 24, 2016. The remake was developed by Christian "Taxman" Whitehead and Simon "Stealth" Thomley using the Retro Engine, previously used in Whitehead's 2011 Sonic CD remake. The remake adds enhancements such as widescreen support, Knuckles as a playable character, time and boss attack modes, online multiplayer, additional multiplayer stages, and Tails's flying and swimming abilities from Sonic the Hedgehog 3. It also restores Hidden Palace Zone as an optional, secret level. Whitehead redesigned Hidden Palace with input from Sonic Team, which informed him that STI had been dissatisfied with the original level design. The Android version sold more than 100,000 paid downloads on the Google Play Store by 2017, and received more than 10 million downloads by 2019 after it was made free-to-play. The remake was included in the 2022 compilation Sonic Origins for the Nintendo Switch, PlayStation 4, PlayStation 5, Windows, Xbox One, and Xbox Series X/S. An updated version of Origins includes Amy Rose as a playable character.

A Nintendo 3DS port was developed by M2 and released as part of Sega's 3D Classics line in Japan on July 22, 2015, and elsewhere on October 8. The port features stereoscopic 3D visuals, the option to switch between the game's regional variants, alternate sound and visual modes, and cheats. M2 was originally hesitant to port the game, and it took the most effort of the 3D Classics line due to its large size and elaborate levels. Several technical tricks, such as the interlacing in the multiplayer mode and the pre-rendering in the special stages, had to be reprogrammed so they could be retained. M2 also developed a Nintendo Switch port for the Sega Ages line, released in February 2020. It includes most of the additions from the 3DS version, as well as the option to use Sonic's Drop Dash ability from Sonic Mania (2017), a time attack mode, and Knuckles in Sonic 2.

Emulated versions of Sonic 2 have been released on digital distribution platforms. It was released on the Wii's Virtual Console on June 11, 2007, the Xbox 360's Xbox Live Arcade on September 12, 2007, Steam on January 26, 2011, the PlayStation 3's PlayStation Network on April 19, 2011, and for Nintendo Switch Online's "Nintendo Classics" library on October 25, 2021. The Wii and Xbox 360 versions allow users to play Knuckles in Sonic 2 if they also own Sonic & Knuckles. An emulated version for iOS was released in April 2010, but was replaced by the remake in 2013; those who purchased the original version were offered the remake for free. The Xbox Live Arcade, PlayStation Network, and Steam versions were delisted in 2022 ahead of the release of Sonic Origins, which received criticism on video game preservation and consumer protection grounds.

== Legacy ==
Sonic 2 was a major factor in keeping Sega competitive during the console wars of the 16-bit era in the early 1990s, and GameSpot and IGN described it as the game that solidified Sonic as a major franchise. It boosted Genesis sales enough to nearly equalize Sega with Nintendo and cemented Sonic as a video game mascot on par with Nintendo's Mario. Further, the Sonic 2sday promotion has been credited for originating the concept of the "street date" in the video game industry, in which games are made available worldwide in all stores on the same day. The practice was uncommon before Sonic 2's release and became a widespread industry trend in the following years. (Note: Attributed to multiple references: Kalinske in VentureBeat, Dustin Hansen in the book Game On!, Greg Smith in Collider, and Nick Thorpe in Retro Gamer.)

Sonic 2 introduced many elements that defined the Sonic franchise. Game Informer wrote that it "expanded the formula in myriad ways, giving Sonic new moves like the spin-dash, bigger stages to explore with more branching paths, and more inventive boss battles." USGamer said that much of the series' most-loved elements originated in Sonic 2 with the introduction of Tails, Super Sonic, and casino levels. Tails became one of the most popular Sonic characters; according to Nilsen, Sega found that Tails was as popular as Sonic because he received nothing but praise through its 800 number phone line. Tails starred in two spin-offs, Tails Adventure and Tails' Skypatrol, for the Game Gear in 1995.

=== Retrospective assessments ===
Sonic 2 continues to receive acclaim. Writing in retrospect, critics said it refined Sonic's formula with greater level diversity and design, better graphics, and quality-of-life improvements. GameSpot said that Sonic 2 "does everything a sequel is supposed to do. It resolves many of the first game's shortcomings and incorporates a slew of minor upgrades that cumulatively amount to a fresh experience." IGN felt the emulated Wii rerelease was easy to recommend. TeamXbox, Eurogamer, and Hardcore Gamer said the level design, music, and fast gameplay still hold up exceptionally well, and GamesRadar+ called it "the most user-friendly of all the Sonic games, beautifully presented and still a challenge if you want to complete it properly".

Retrospective objects of criticism include the multiplayer mode and the implementation of Tails. Reviewers disliked the image distortion brought about by the multiplayer mode's squeezed and flickering graphics, while they considered Tails a burden due to his interference in boss battles. Additionally, Eurogamer described the visuals of the special stages as "dreadfully blocky", and IGN felt that the inclusion of Tails in the stages was "detrimental at best" since he constantly hits bombs and makes the player lose progress. GamesRadar+ said that the game "could be criticized for 'playing itself'" during sequences when Sonic careens at high speeds, but countered that it still felt as if the player retained control over him.

The 2010 iOS and DS versions received middling reviews according to aggregator Metacritic, with criticism for their quality and lack of multiplayer, (Note: Attributed to multiple references: IGN, Destructoid, and Nintendo Life) but the 2013 remake was considered the definitive version. TouchArcade called it a "beautiful remaster" that would appeal to old and new fans and found it surreal to finally play the once-removed Hidden Palace in an official capacity. Critics praised the 3DS version for its implementation of the system's stereoscopic 3D and the added bonus features, with Nintendo World Report writing that the addition of cheats made difficult moments less frustrating. Nintendo Life was disappointed that the Switch version did not include the 2013 remake's features and felt that M2 should have chosen a lesser-known game to port, given the copious number of Sonic 2 rereleases. Nonetheless, Nintendo Life felt it was an excellent port and a "must-have" for first-time players.

Sonic 2 is considered one of the greatest video games. Game Informer named it the 71st-best game and the most challenging and polished Sonic game. Sonic 2 was voted the best Sonic game in a survey of fans conducted by Official Nintendo Magazine in 2010, and GameZone named it the second-best Sonic game (behind Sonic 3) in 2011. GamesRadar+ named Sonic 2 the best Sonic game and the second-best Genesis game in 2017. In November 2017, Iizuka said that he felt Sonic 2 "really is the best of the classic Sonic series. The level design is just really, really solid... All of the [Sega] staff would say it was a great game for Japanese tastes but also a great game for American tastes. Sonic 2 really captured that global sense of game design and level design."

=== Research ===
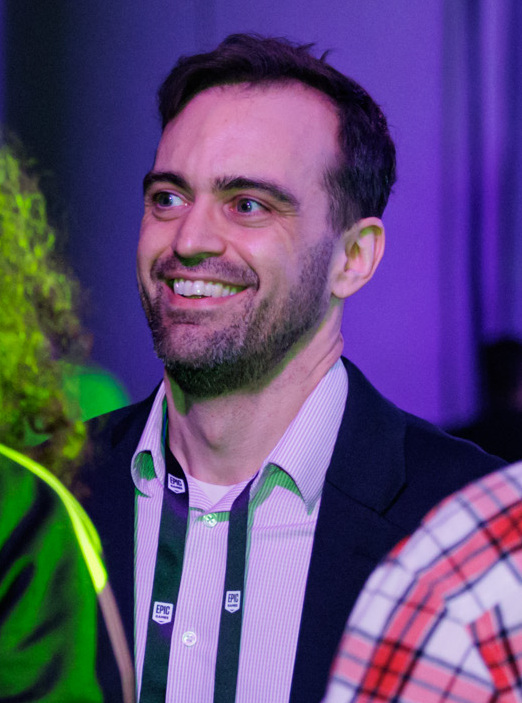
The Video Game History Foundation founder Frank Cifaldi (pictured in 2023) credited Sonic 2 researchers with shaping how video game history is studied.

Sonic the Hedgehog 2 is famous for its amount of cut content, and a community dedicated to researching it developed. The video game historian Frank Cifaldi estimated that only half of the planned content was used in the final game. Interest in Sonic 2's development began after players discovered that Hidden Palace, which appeared in magazine previews, was missing from the released game. As anticipation for the first 3D Sonic game, Sonic Adventure (1998), rekindled interest in the franchise after several years of inactivity, rumors of prototype builds with cut content in circulation intensified.

In 1999, a Sonic fan, Simon Wai, discovered the ROM image for an early prototype containing Hidden Palace, Wood, and Genocide City levels on a Chinese website and shared it with the Western Sonic fandom. The discovery played a significant role in the development of a video game community in which players datamine games and document their prototypes to understand how they were developed. The journalist Heidi Kemps presented the prototype to Naka during a 2005 GameSpy interview and he identified it as originating from a preview cartridge that had been stolen from a 1992 New York City toy show. A Sonic fan discovered the Sonic 2 prototype featured on Nick Arcade in 2006 and raised over US$1,500 to buy the cartridge and release the ROM image online. The Nick Arcade prototype, while primitive and unpolished, showed fans how STI built the game atop the original Sonic the Hedgehog.

In 2023, Cifaldi's Video Game History Foundation (VGHF) obtained design documents from one of Sonic 2's artists, Tom Payne, which included the Genocide City sprites, palettes, and level layouts. They worked with Hez, a member of the Sonic fangame community, to create a playable reconstruction. The VGHF also obtained a VHS portfolio from Cook which contained animated artwork from the cut desert level, Sand Shower, and a previously unseen winter level. Cifaldi credited fans' research into Sonic 2 with shaping how video game history is studied and said the VGHF has roots in his interest in Sonic 2's development.

=== Influence ===
For Sonic's 20th anniversary in 2011, Sega released Sonic Generations, which features reimagined versions of stages from across the series' history. The PlayStation 3, Xbox 360, and Windows versions contain remakes of Sonic 2's Chemical Plant Zone and Death Egg Robot boss fight, while the Nintendo 3DS version contains a remake of Casino Night. Additionally, a Casino Night-themed pinball minigame was released as downloadable content. Sonic Mania features reimagined versions of Chemical Plant and Oil Ocean, while Sonic Forces (2017) features a reimagined version of Chemical Plant. Some design elements from Sonic 2 feature in Studio Pierrot's Sonic the Hedgehog (1996) original video animation. The feature film Sonic the Hedgehog 2 (2022) draws inspiration from Sonic 2, though it is not a direct adaptation. The Death Egg Robot and Super Sonic appear in the film, while one of its posters recreates Martin's Sonic 2 box art illustration.

A high-definition (HD) fangame remake, Sonic 2 HD, entered development for Windows and macOS in 2008. The project was canceled in 2012 after the release of a game demo that Retro Gamer described as "blighted by programming incompetence", due to high system requirements and digital rights management that inadvertently triggered antivirus software. However, the project was restarted by a new team in 2014. It is planned to feature additional levels, multiplayer modes, and the option to play as Knuckles. Sonic 2 is also noted for its active modding community, which releases ROM hacks featuring new game mechanics and playable characters. Modders decompiled the source code of the 2013 Sonic 2 remake in 2021, allowing it to be unofficially ported to other platforms.
