= Sonic Classic Collection =

2010 video game

- North American cover art
- Developer: Creative Assembly
- Publisher: Sega
- Series: Sonic the Hedgehog
- Platform: Nintendo DS
- Release: NA: March 2, 2010; AU: March 11, 2010; EU: March 12, 2010
- Genre: Platform
- Mode: Single-player

Sonic Classic Collection is a 2010 video game compilation developed by Creative Assembly and published by Sega for the Nintendo DS. It contains the four main Sonic the Hedgehog platform games originally released for the Sega Genesis: Sonic the Hedgehog (1991), Sonic the Hedgehog 2 (1992), Sonic the Hedgehog 3 (1994), and Sonic & Knuckles (1994). Upon release, Sonic Classic Collection received mixed reviews.

== Overview ==
Sonic Classic Collection contains Sonic the Hedgehog, Sonic the Hedgehog 2, Sonic the Hedgehog 3, and Sonic & Knuckles. The Lock-on modes from the original Sonic & Knuckles cartridge (Knuckles in Sonic the Hedgehog 2 and Sonic 3 & Knuckles) are fully implemented and playable. The ability to save at any point, a feature absent in the original games, is also present. Alongside the main games, a gallery of character artwork from the Sonic series is viewable.

== Development and release ==
On November 11, 2009, the BBFC classified Sonic Classic Collection, accidentally announcing the game early. Two videos, one about Sonic Chronicles: The Dark Brotherhood and the other about the history of the Sonic franchise, were listed as content present within the game. These were presumably cut, as they are not featured in the final version of the game. Sonic Classic Collection was formally announced by Sega on December 1, 2009 through a press release, with Creative Assembly's Australian studio developing.

A limited edition, exclusive to Spain and Australia, was released concurrently alongside the standard version of the game. The limited edition comes with a tin box containing the base game, a Sonic figurine, and five postcards of Sonic artwork.

In 2015, Sonic Classic Collection illustrations were discovered in a former Creative Assembly Australia employee's portfolio, including Sonic Spinball, Dr. Robotnik's Mean Bean Machine, and Sonic 3D Blast logos, suggesting that at some point these games were considered for inclusion, although they were not present in the final release.

== Reception ==
Reception

Aggregate score
| Aggregator | Score |
|---|---|
| Metacritic | 70/100 |

Review scores
| Publication | Score |
|---|---|
| GamesRadar+ | 3/5 |
| IGN | 7/10 |
| Nintendo Life | 7/10 |
| VideoGamer.com | 8/10 |

According to review aggregator website Metacritic, Sonic Classic Collection received "mixed or average" reviews. Critics generally agreed that the compilation was fun and that the games could still be enjoyable after their original release. However, critics criticised the emulation for "the iffy frame rate present in all the games", and "although the game never slows down to the extent of Sonic's infamous Game Boy Advance outing, it's a fact that the DS shouldn't be struggling with these games". More points of contention were the lack of multiplayer and how loading a file "just kicks you back to the start of the level that you were playing". A lack of extras was another complaint, as they were described as "extremely little... to get excited about" and how Classic Collection had "only the basics of legacy material like character art."
