= List of best-selling Nintendo Entertainment System video games =

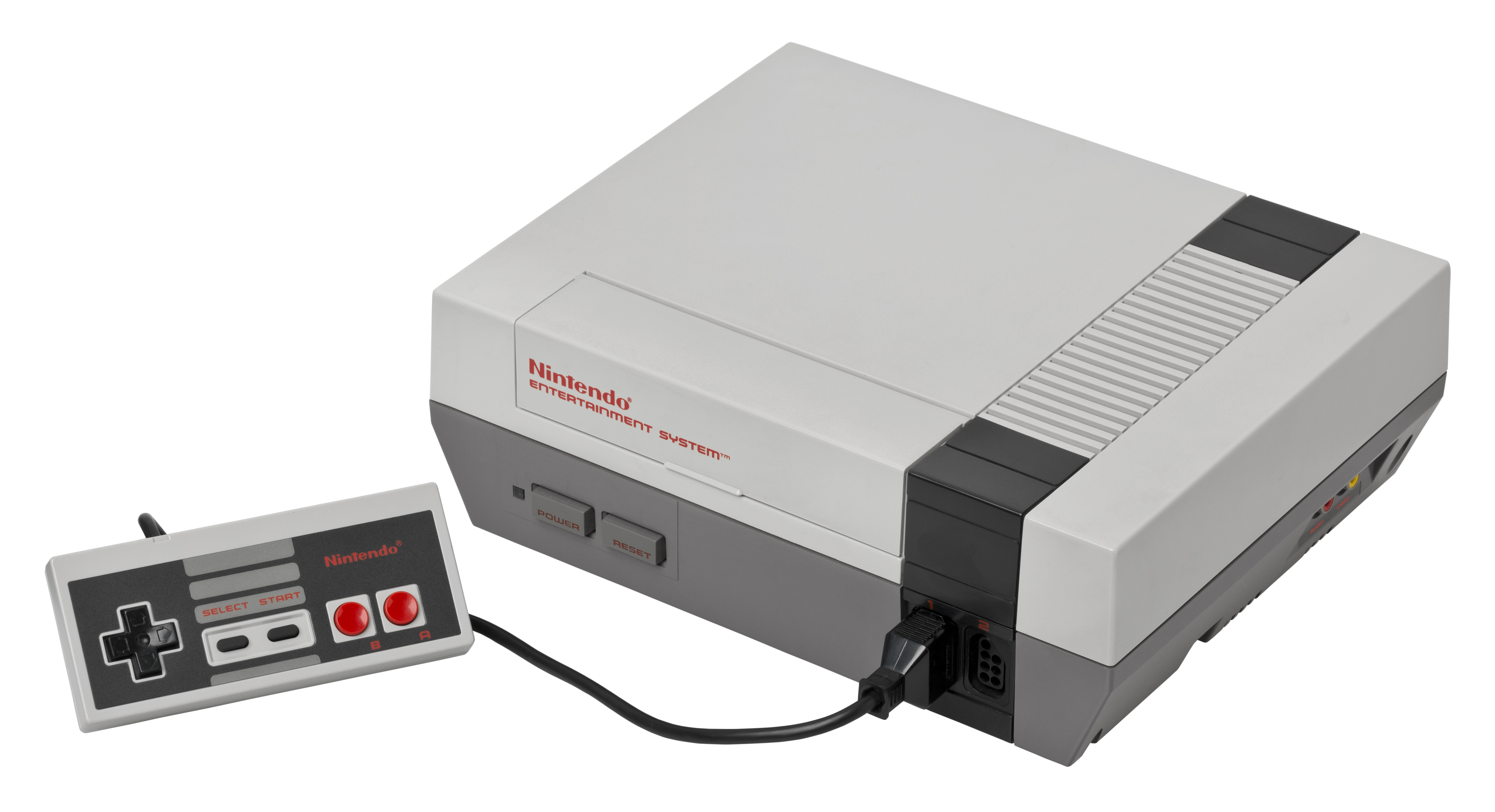
NES with connected controller

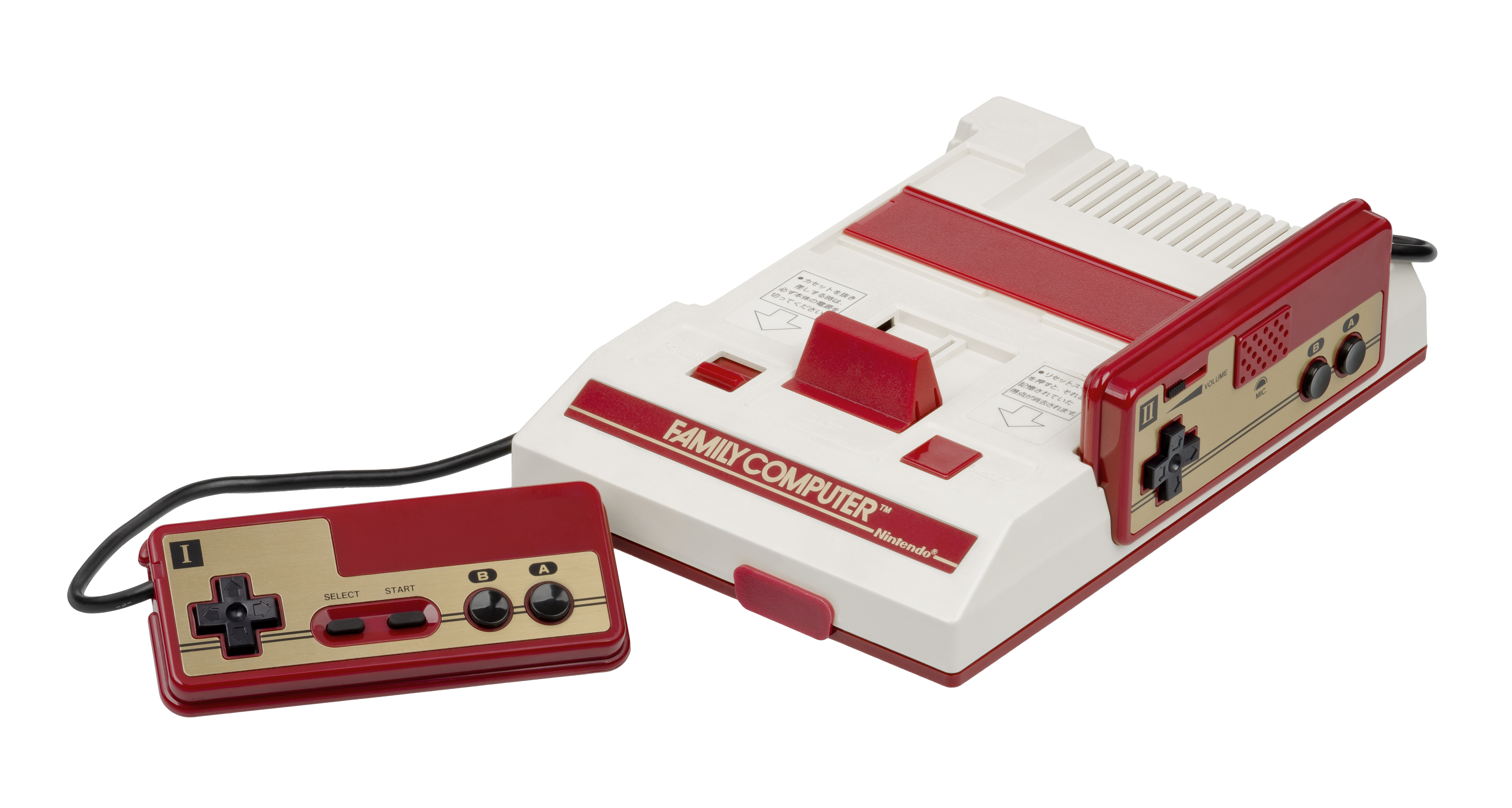
Famicom with built-in controllers

The list of best-selling Nintendo Entertainment System video games totals 75 games with sales or shipments of at least one million copies. The Family Computer (Famicom) video game console was first released in 1983 and later redesigned as the Nintendo Entertainment System (NES) in 1985. Its best-selling game is Super Mario Bros., first released in Japan on September 13, 1985, with sales of more than 40 million copies worldwide, making it one of the best-selling video games of all time. Two sequels are within the top five best-selling NES games: Super Mario Bros. 2 ranks fifth at 7.46 million units, and Super Mario Bros. 3 ranks third at 18 million units. The remaining top six are Duck Hunt with 28 million units, Tetris with 8 million units, and The Legend of Zelda with 6.5 million units.

Of these 87 games, 31 were developed by internal Nintendo development divisions, and 41 were published by Nintendo. Other developers with the most million-selling games include Capcom with seven games, and Konami, Hudson Soft, and Tose, with six games each. Other publishers include Bandai and Hudson Soft with five games each, and Enix and Namco with four games each. The most popular franchises on NES include Super Mario with 67.63 million combined units, Dragon Quest with 11.475 million combined units, and The Legend of Zelda with 10.89 million combined units.

== Games ==
Key
†	Game was bundled with console during its lifetime

Game	Developer(s) (Note: Only developers and publishers for the original release of each game are listed.)	Publisher(s)	Release date (Note: Only the initial release date on this platform is listed.)	Sales	Ref
Super Mario Bros. †	Nintendo R&D4	Nintendo	September 13, 1985	40,240,000	
Duck Hunt †	Nintendo R&D1	Nintendo	April 21, 1984	28,310,000	
Super Mario Bros. 3 †	Nintendo R&D4	Nintendo	October 23, 1988	18,000,000	
Tetris	Nintendo R&D1	Nintendo	November 1989	8,000,000	
Super Mario Bros. 2 (international version)	Nintendo R&D4	Nintendo	October 9, 1988	7,460,000	
The Legend of Zelda	Nintendo R&D4	Nintendo	February 21, 1986	6,510,000	
Dr. Mario	Nintendo R&D1	Nintendo	July 27, 1990	4,850,000	
Zelda II: The Adventure of Link	Nintendo R&D4	Nintendo	January 14, 1987	4,380,000	
Excitebike	Nintendo R&D1	Nintendo	November 30, 1984	4,160,000	
Golf	Nintendo R&D1	Nintendo	May 1, 1984	4,010,000	
Teenage Mutant Ninja Turtles †	Konami	JP: Konami; NA: Ultra Games	May 12, 1989	4,000,000	
Dragon Quest III	Chunsoft	Enix	February 10, 1988	3,895,000	
Kung Fu	Nintendo R&D1	Nintendo	June 21, 1985	3,500,000	
Baseball	Nintendo R&D1	Nintendo	December 7, 1983	3,200,000	
Dragon Quest IV	Chunsoft	Enix	February 11, 1990	3,180,000	
World Class Track Meet †	TRY Co.	Nintendo	December 23, 1986	3,080,000	
Punch-Out!!	Nintendo R&D3	Nintendo	September 18, 1987	3,000,000	
Metroid	Nintendo R&D1 (Note: Intelligent Systems worked as additional developers on Metroid.)	Nintendo	August 6, 1986	2,730,000	
Super Mario Bros. 2 (Japanese version)	Nintendo R&D4	Nintendo	June 3, 1986	2,650,000	
Dragon Quest II	Chunsoft	Enix	January 26, 1987	2,550,000	
Ice Hockey	Nintendo R&D2	Nintendo	January 21, 1988	2,420,000	
Pro Wrestling	Nintendo R&D3	Nintendo	October 13, 1986	2,400,000	
Mario Bros.	Nintendo R&D1	Nintendo	September 9, 1983	2,280,000	
Tennis	Nintendo R&D1 (Note: Intelligent Systems worked as additional developers on Tennis.)	Nintendo	January 14, 1984	2,170,000	
Volleyball	Nintendo R&D3	Nintendo	July 21, 1986	2,150,000	
Mah-Jong	Nintendo R&D1	Nintendo	August 27, 1983	2,140,000	
R.C. Pro-Am	Rare	Nintendo	February 1988	2,140,000	
Pro Yakyū Family Stadium (R.B.I. Baseball)	Namco	Namco	December 10, 1986	2,050,000	
Dragon Quest	Chunsoft	JP: Enix; NA: Nintendo	May 27, 1986	2,000,000	
Top Gun	Konami	Konami	November 1987	2,000,000	
Soccer	Intelligent Systems	Nintendo	April 9, 1985	1,960,000	
Rad Racer	Square	JP: Square; NA: Nintendo; EU: Mattel	August 7, 1987	1,960,000	
Pinball	Nintendo R&D1	Nintendo	February 2, 1984	1,850,000	
Ninja Gaiden	Tecmo	Tecmo	December 9, 1988	1,800,000	
Kid Icarus	Nintendo R&D1; Tose	Nintendo	December 19, 1986	1,760,000	
Yoshi	Game Freak	Nintendo	December 14, 1991	1,750,000	
Kirby's Adventure	HAL Laboratory	Nintendo	March 23, 1993	1,750,000	
DuckTales	Capcom	Capcom	September 14, 1989	1,670,000	
Ghosts 'n Goblins	Capcom; Micronics	Capcom	June 13, 1986	1,640,000	
Bases Loaded	Tose	Jaleco	June 26, 1987	1,580,000	
Donkey Kong Classics	Nintendo R&D1	Nintendo	October 1988	1,560,000	
Tecmo Bowl	Tecmo	Tecmo	February 1989	1,530,000	
F1 Race	HAL Laboratory	Nintendo	November 2, 1984	1,520,000	
Mega Man 2	Capcom	Capcom	December 24, 1988	1,510,000	
Lode Runner	Hudson Soft	Broderbund; Hudson Soft	July 31, 1984	1,500,000	
Xevious	Namco	JP: Namco; NA: Bandai	November 8, 1984	1,500,000	
Ice Climber	Nintendo R&D1	Nintendo	January 30, 1985	1,500,000	
Ninja Hattori-kun	Hudson Soft	Hudson Soft	March 5, 1986	1,500,000	
Mighty Bomb Jack	Tecmo	Tecmo	April 24, 1986	1,500,000	
Nintendo World Cup	Technōs Japan	JP: Technōs Japan; NA/EU: Nintendo	May 18, 1990	1,480,000	
4 Nin Uchi Mahjong	Hudson Soft	Nintendo	November 2, 1984	1,450,000	
Final Fantasy III	Square	Square	April 27, 1990	1,400,000	
Gyromite †	Nintendo R&D1	Nintendo	August 13, 1985	1,320,000	
Final Fantasy	Square	Square	December 18, 1987	1,300,000	
Pro Yakyū Family Stadium '87	Namco	Namco	December 22, 1987	1,300,000	
Hogan's Alley	Nintendo R&D1	Nintendo	June 12, 1984	1,270,000	
Ninja Kid	Tose	Bandai	April 17, 1986	1,250,000	
Dragon Power	Tose	Bandai	November 27, 1986	1,250,000	
Battletoads	Rare	Tradewest	June 1991	1,250,000	
TwinBee	Konami	Konami	January 7, 1986	1,200,000	
Ganbare Goemon! Karakuri Dōchū	Konami	Konami	July 30, 1986	1,200,000	
Chip 'n Dale Rescue Rangers	Capcom	Capcom	June 8, 1990	1,200,000	
Tecmo Super Bowl	Tecmo	Tecmo	December 13, 1991	1,190,000	
Doraemon	Hudson Soft	Hudson Soft	December 12, 1986	1,150,000	
Commando	Capcom	Capcom	September 27, 1986	1,140,000	
Donkey Kong	Nintendo R&D1	Nintendo	July 15, 1983	1,130,000	
Yoshi's Cookie	Tose	Nintendo	November 21, 1992	1,120,000	
Donkey Kong Jr.	Nintendo R&D1	Nintendo	July 15, 1983	1,110,000	
Popeye	Nintendo R&D1	Nintendo	July 15, 1983	1,100,000	
Pro Yakyū Family Stadium '88	Namco	Namco	December 20, 1988	1,080,000	
Mega Man 3	Capcom	Capcom	September 28, 1990	1,080,000	
Famicom Jump: Hero Retsuden	Tose	Bandai	February 15, 1989	1,060,000	
Tag Team Match: MUSCLE	Tose	Bandai	November 8, 1985	1,050,000	
Adventure Island	Hudson Soft	Hudson Soft	September 12, 1986	1,050,000	
WWF WrestleMania	Rare	Acclaim Entertainment	February 1989	1,042,408	
Ninja JaJaMaru-kun	Jaleco	Jaleco	November 15, 1985	1,000,000	
1942	Capcom; Micronics	Capcom	December 11, 1985	1,000,000	
Bomberman	Hudson Soft	Hudson Soft	December 20, 1985	1,000,000	
Hydlide	T&E Soft	JP: Toshiba EMI; NA: FCI	March 18, 1986	1,000,000	
Gradius	Konami	Konami	April 25, 1986	1,000,000	
Tiger Heli	Micronics	JP: Pony Canyon; NA/EU: Acclaim Entertainment	December 5, 1986	1,000,000	
Momotarō Densetsu	Hudson Soft	Hudson Soft	October 26, 1987	1,000,000	
Metal Gear	Konami	JP: Konami; NA: Ultra Games	December 22, 1987	1,000,000	
NES Open Tournament Golf	Nintendo R&D2	Nintendo	September 20, 1991	1,000,000	
Castlevania	Konami	Konami	September 26, 1986	1,000,000	
Fester's Quest	Sunsoft	Sunsoft	September 1989	1,000,000	
Mickey Mousecapade	Hudson Soft	JP: Hudson Soft; NA: Capcom	March 6, 1987	1,000,000	

== See also ==
- List of best-selling Nintendo video games
