= List of best-selling Nintendo video games =

Logo of Nintendo

This list covers the best-selling video games by Nintendo that have sold at least 20 million units. Sales figures are compiled from publicly available reports and may not account for every possible release or sales update. For this reason, the order of the games is not indicative of sales ranking but reflects the available, well-documented information. The best-selling Nintendo video game is reported to be Wii Sports, selling over 82 million units. It was released for the Wii console and was bundled with it in most regions outside of Japan.

== Analysis ==
=== Background ===
Nintendo is well-known for bundling its games with consoles, for instance, Wii Sports with the Wii, Super Mario Bros. with the Nintendo Entertainment System, and Tetris with the Game Boy. Nintendo is regarded as one of the few gaming companies that consistently publishes detailed financial information about its video games. Unlike many other companies in the video game industry, which may release only selective figures or provide limited insights into their sales performance, Nintendo has regularly disclosed explicit data through its quarterly and annual reports.

Shigeru Miyamoto, a long-standing figure at Nintendo, stated on the company's behalf that a game should only be considered fully successful once it approaches the 30 million sales milestone. Besides the sales data provided directly by Nintendo, the Computer Entertainment Supplier's Association (CESA), a Japanese organization that reports on the broader national video game industry, also known to have published sales data for Nintendo titles.

=== Retrospective ===
In 2009, according to a video games-related website, Destructoid, deciding the best-selling title between Wii Sports and Super Mario Bros. was controversial. They also contacted Nintendo for confirmation but received no explicit response. Around the same year, sales tracking website VGChartz published a list of the top ten best-selling video games, with reporters from TechRadar and CNET observing that Wii Sports had surpassed Super Mario Bros. as the best-seller. However, VGChartz has been deemed questionable for the estimation it provides. Additionally, Nintendo did not confirm the sales data reported by VGChartz.

Satoru Iwata, then-president of Nintendo, revealed in an interview of Iwata Asks that Super Mario Bros. was the company's best-selling title for over two decades until it was surpassed by Wii Sports, although he was hesitant about the fact that Wii Sports sales were dependent on bundles. Matt Peckham, a journalist associated with the news outlet ABC News, likewise expressed concerns regarding the manner in which Wii Sports was marketed and sold and how it differs from other games. Further emphasizing this bundling issue, gaming website GameSpot has used its own methodology to exclude Wii Sports and instead have it replaced by Mario Kart 8 Deluxe on the Nintendo Switch for the top spot in their list of ten best-selling Nintendo titles from March 2024. For reference, in May 2014, Bloomberg Originals published a YouTube list ranking the five best-selling Nintendo games from lowest to highest: New Super Mario Bros. Wii, Wii Sports Resort, Mario Kart Wii, Super Mario Bros., and Wii Sports.

The decision to make Wii Sports a free pack-in game for the Wii console was strongly advocated by Nintendo's former president, Reggie Fils-Aimé, during the system's development. Fils-Aimé argued internally with Miyamoto that the Wii was intended to appeal not only to experienced players but also to new audiences, and that Wii Sports could serve as an accessible introduction to gaming. He emphasized that the game made effective use of the Wii Remote and was based on activities familiar to a global audience, making the software an ideal demonstration of the console's core features. Miyamoto initially opposed the proposal, citing Nintendo's reluctance to distribute software for free and the effort required to develop such content. Fils-Aimé countered by noting that Nintendo had previously bundled software with hardware, such as with the Super Nintendo Entertainment System, when it aligned with strategic goals. He ultimately convinced Miyamoto that including Wii Sports would add immediate value to the hardware experience and provide a common point of reference for new users upon setup.

In April 2022, Aaron Greenbaum, a journalist from the Den of Geek website, wrote an article titled "Why Wii Sports Is the Best-Selling Nintendo Game Ever". In that article, he examined Wii Sports sales and the strategy that was used to sell it. According to Greenbaum, half of the game's sales were from North America, including 41 million copies of the game that were sold in the United States, in comparison to the Wii console's 45 million units. However, in Japan, where the game was not bundled with the console, it sold far fewer copies: 3.77 million compared to the console's 12.7 million units. Greenbaum argued that the game would not have sold that well if it was sold separately, although he praised the game's accessibility for a broader audience, making it the worthy killer app for the console.

=== List ===
Below is a list of Nintendo video games that have exceeded a minimum of 20 million units. Sales figures are presented on a platform-by-platform basis, consistent with Nintendo's standard reporting practices. For example, if the same game is released on multiple systems, sales for each platform are counted individually rather than combined.

Some points to note regarding the list: while Tetris for the Game Boy is listed with sales of 30.26 million units, some sources estimate its total sales to be between 35 million and 40 million. Additionally, while New Super Mario Bros. U on the Wii U with over 5 million units and its Deluxe version on the Nintendo Switch with over 18 million units collectively complete the requirement of 20 million units, neither version individually meets the platform-specific threshold required for inclusion in this list. Lastly, Pokémon games, developed by the Game Freak company, are released differently compared to other games listed here, typically in paired versions such as Pokémon Red and Blue. This release strategy has been attributed to an effort to compete with the Super Mario series, according to Miyamoto.

The games listed are published mainly by Nintendo; however, titles including Pokémon Sword and Shield and Pokémon Scarlet and Violet shared a publisher, The Pokémon Company, for their Japanese release, while Nintendo handled the international publishing.

(Updated as of September 2026)
Game	Sales (mln)	Genre	Platform	Launch	Developer(s)	Ref.
Wii Sports	82.90	Sports simulation	Wii	November 19, 2006	Nintendo EAD	
Mario Kart 8 Deluxe	72.00	Kart racing	Switch	April 28, 2017	Nintendo EPD	
Animal Crossing: New Horizons	50.63	Social simulation	Switch	March 20, 2020	Nintendo EPD	
Super Mario Bros.	40.24	Platformer	NES	September 13, 1985	Nintendo R&D4	
Super Smash Bros. Ultimate	38.50	Fighting	Switch	December 7, 2018	Bandai Namco Studios; Sora Ltd	
Mario Kart Wii	37.38	Kart racing	Wii	April 10, 2008	Nintendo EAD	
The Legend of Zelda: Breath of the Wild	34.28	Action-adventure	Switch	March 3, 2017	Nintendo EPD	
Wii Sports Resort	33.14	Sports simulation	Wii	June 25, 2009	Nintendo EAD	
Pokémon Red/Green/Blue	31.40	Role-playing	Game Boy	February 27, 1996	Game Freak	
Super Mario Odyssey	31.06	Platformer	Switch	October 27, 2017	Nintendo EPD	
New Super Mario Bros.	30.80	Platformer	DS	May 15, 2006	Nintendo EAD	
New Super Mario Bros. Wii	30.32	Platformer	Wii	November 12, 2009	Nintendo EAD	
Tetris	30.26	Puzzle	Game Boy	June 14, 1989	Nintendo R&D1	
Pokémon Scarlet/Violet	28.66	Role-playing	Switch	November 18, 2022	Game Freak	
Duck Hunt	28.31	Light-gun shooter	NES	April 21, 1984	Nintendo R&D1; Intelligent Systems	
Wii Play	28.02	Party	Wii	December 2, 2006	Nintendo EAD	
Pokémon Sword/Shield	27.36	Role-playing	Switch	November 15, 2019	Game Freak	
Nintendogs	23.96	Pet-raising simulation	DS	April 21, 2005	Nintendo EAD	
Pokémon Gold/Silver	23.73	Role-playing	GBC	November 21, 1999	Game Freak	
Mario Kart DS	23.60	Kart racing	DS	November 14, 2005	Nintendo EAD	
The Legend of Zelda: Tears of the Kingdom	22.90	Action-adventure	Switch	May 12, 2023	Nintendo EPD	
Wii Fit	22.67	Exergaming	Wii	December 1, 2007	Nintendo EAD	
Super Mario Party	21.39	Party	Switch	October 5, 2018	NDcube	
Wii Fit Plus	21.13	Exergaming	Wii	October 1, 2009	Nintendo EAD	
Super Mario World	20.61	Platformer	SNES	November 21, 1990	Nintendo EAD	

Number of entries per platform (descending)
Platform	Type	Launch	Developer(s)	Manufacturer(s)	Entries
Switch	Hybrid	March 3, 2017	Nintendo PTD	Foxconn; Hosiden	9
Wii	Home	November 19, 2006	Nintendo IRD	Foxconn	7
DS	Handheld	November 21, 2004	Nintendo	Foxconn	3
NES	Home	July 15, 1983	Nintendo R&D2	Nintendo	2
Game Boy	Handheld	April 21, 1989	Nintendo R&D1	Nintendo	2
SNES	Home	November 21, 1990	Nintendo R&D2	Nintendo	1
GBC	Handheld	October 21, 1998	Nintendo RED	Nintendo	1

== See also ==
- Lists of best-selling video games by platform
- List of best-selling video games
