= List of best-selling Super Nintendo Entertainment System video games =

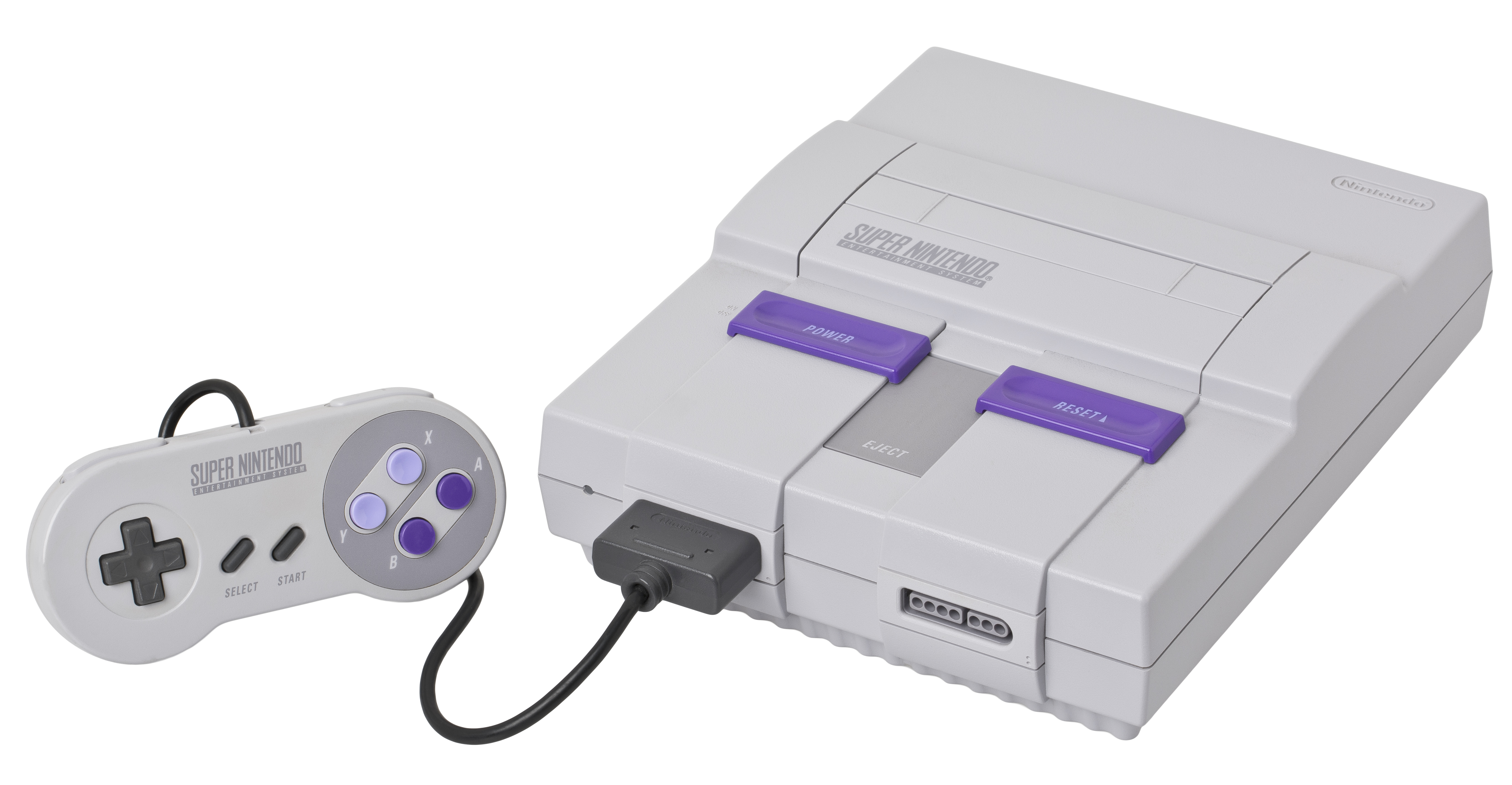
Super Nintendo Entertainment System (North America) with controller

This is a list of video games for the Super Nintendo Entertainment System (SNES) video game console, known as the Super Famicom (SFC) in Japan, that have sold or shipped at least one million copies. The best-selling game on the SNES is Super Mario World. First released in Japan on November 21, 1990, it went on to sell over 20 million units worldwide. The second Super Mario game on the SNES, Super Mario All-Stars, is the second-best-selling game on the platform, with sales in excess of 10.5 million units. The console's top five is rounded out by Rare's Donkey Kong Country in third, with sales of 9.3 million units, while its two follow-ups are also in the top ten, Super Mario Kart in fourth, selling over 8.7 million units, and Street Fighter II: The World Warrior in fifth, with 6.3 million units sold.

There are a total of 55 SNES/Super Famicom games on this list which are confirmed to have sold or shipped at least one million units. Of these, thirteen were developed by internal Nintendo development divisions. Other developers with the most million selling games include Capcom and Square, with nine games each in the list of 54. Of the 54 games on this list, 21 of them were published in one or more regions by Nintendo. Other publishers with multiple million selling games include Capcom with nine games, Square with eight games, Enix with five games, and Acclaim Entertainment with three games. The best selling franchises on the SNES include Super Mario (46.18 million combined units), Donkey Kong (17.96 million combined units), and Street Fighter (12.4 million combined units).

== List ==
Key
†	Game was bundled with SNES consoles during its lifetime

Game	Developer(s) (Note: Only developers and publishers for the original release of each game are listed.)	Publisher(s)	Release date (Note: Only the initial release date on this platform is listed.)	Sales	Ref.
Super Mario World †	Nintendo EAD	Nintendo	November 21, 1990	20,610,000	
Super Mario All-Stars †	Nintendo EAD	Nintendo	July 14, 1993	10,550,000	
Donkey Kong Country †	Rare	Nintendo	November 18, 1994	9,300,000	
Super Mario Kart †	Nintendo EAD	Nintendo	August 27, 1992	8,760,000	
Street Fighter II: The World Warrior †	Capcom	Capcom	June 10, 1992	6,300,000	
Donkey Kong Country 2: Diddy's Kong Quest †	Rare	Nintendo	November 21, 1995	5,150,000	
The Legend of Zelda: A Link to the Past †	Nintendo EAD	Nintendo	November 21, 1991	4,610,000	
Super Mario World 2: Yoshi's Island †	Nintendo EAD	Nintendo	August 5, 1995	4,120,000	
Street Fighter II Turbo	Capcom	Capcom	July 10, 1993	4,100,000	
Star Fox †	Nintendo EAD; Argonaut Software	Nintendo	February 21, 1993	4,000,000	
Donkey Kong Country 3: Dixie Kong's Double Trouble!	Rare	Nintendo	November 18, 1996	3,510,000	
Final Fantasy VI	Square	Square	April 2, 1994	3,420,000	
Killer Instinct †	Rare	Nintendo	August 30, 1995	3,200,000	
Dragon Quest VI	Heartbeat	Enix	December 9, 1995	3,200,000	
F-Zero †	Nintendo EAD	Nintendo	November 21, 1990	2,850,000	
Dragon Quest V	Chunsoft	Enix	September 27, 1992	2,800,000	
Chrono Trigger	Square	Square	March 11, 1995	2,500,000	
Final Fantasy V	Square	Square	December 6, 1992	2,450,000	
Mario Paint †	Nintendo R&D1	Nintendo	July 14, 1992	2,310,000	
Super Mario RPG	Square	Nintendo	March 9, 1996	2,140,000	
Pilotwings	Nintendo EAD	Nintendo	December 21, 1990	2,000,000	
Super Street Fighter II	Capcom	Capcom	June 25, 1994	2,000,000	
SimCity	Nintendo EAD	Nintendo	April 26, 1991	1,980,000	
Secret of Mana	Square	Square	August 6, 1993	1,830,000	
Final Fantasy IV	Square	Square	July 19, 1991	1,800,000	
Disney's Aladdin	Capcom	Capcom	November 15, 1993	1,750,000	
Super Puyo Puyo	Compile	Banpresto	December 10, 1993	1,700,000	
Super Scope 6	Nintendo R&D1	Nintendo	February 1992	1,650,000	
Mortal Kombat II	Sculptured Software	Acclaim Entertainment	September 9, 1994	1,510,000	
Romancing SaGa 2	Square	Square	December 10, 1993	1,490,000	
Final Fight	Capcom	Capcom	December 21, 1990	1,480,000	
Dragon Ball Z: Super Butōden	Tose	Bandai	March 20, 1993	1,450,000	
Kirby Super Star †	HAL Laboratory	Nintendo	March 21, 1996	1,440,000	
Super Metroid	Nintendo R&D1; Intelligent Systems	Nintendo	March 19, 1994	1,420,000	
Dragon Quest III	Heartbeat	Enix	December 6, 1996	1,400,000	
Romancing SaGa	Square	Square	January 28, 1992	1,320,000	
Wonder Project J	Almanic Corporation	Enix	December 9, 1994	1,300,000	
Romancing SaGa 3	Square	Square	November 11, 1995	1,300,000	
The Lion King	Westwood Studios	Virgin Interactive	November 9, 1994	1,270,000	
NBA Jam	Iguana Entertainment	Acclaim Entertainment	March 4, 1994	1,220,000	
Mortal Kombat 3	Sculptured Software	Acclaim Entertainment	October 13, 1995	1,220,000	
The Magical Quest Starring Mickey Mouse	Capcom	Capcom	November 20, 1992	1,210,000	
Dragon Quest I & II	Chunsoft	Enix	December 18, 1993	1,200,000	
Ken Griffey Jr. Presents Major League Baseball	Software Creations	Nintendo	March 1994	1,200,000	
Derby Stallion III	ASCII Entertainment	Nintendo	January 20, 1995	1,200,000	
Mega Man X	Capcom	Capcom	December 17, 1993	1,160,000	
Dragon Ball Z: Super Butōden 2	Tose	Bandai	December 17, 1993	1,150,000	
Derby Stallion '96	ASCII Entertainment	Nintendo	March 15, 1996	1,100,000	
Super Ghouls 'n Ghosts	Capcom	Capcom	October 4, 1991	1,090,000	
Final Fight 2	Capcom	Capcom	May 22, 1993	1,030,000	
Super Tetris 2 + Bombliss	Bullet-Proof Software	Tose	December 18, 1992	1,000,000	
Tetris 2	Bullet-Proof Software	Nintendo	July 8, 1994	1,000,000	
Space Invaders: The Original Game	Taito	Taito	March 25, 1994	1,000,000	
Super Star Wars	Sculptured Software; LucasArts	JVC Musical Industries	November 1, 1992	1,000,000	
Super Bomberman 2	Produce!	Hudson Soft	April 28, 1994	1,000,000	

== See also ==
- List of best-selling Nintendo video games
