= List of best-selling video games =

A List

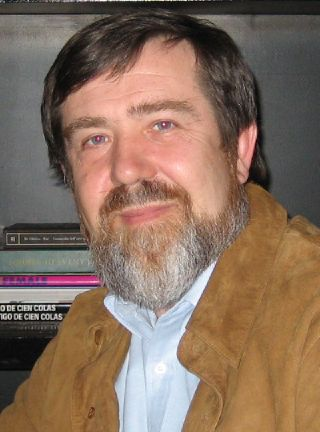
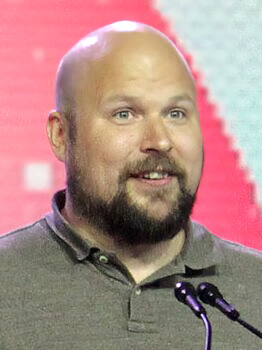
Alexey Pajitnov (left) and Markus Persson (right), creators of Tetris and Minecraft, respectively. Critics have debated which of these games should be classified as the best-selling video game, mainly due to definitional disputes surrounding Tetris.

This is a list of the best-selling video games worldwide, ranked up to 50th place by reported software unit sales. Reliable sources are split as to whether the title of best-selling video game should belong to Tetris, a 1988 multi-platform puzzle video game created by Alexey Pajitnov, or to Minecraft, a 2011 multi-platform sandbox game created by Markus Persson and developed by Mojang Studios. Some sources consider Tetris to be the best-selling video game by combining the sales of all of its different versions, totaling 520 million as of 2022, while others consider the best-selling video game to be Minecraft, which has sold over 425 million copies as of 2026, rejecting the aggregation of each Tetris release. (Note: Tetris is considered the best-selling video game by Encyclopædia Britannica, Forbes, GameSpot, IGN, and Kotaku. Minecraft is considered the best-selling video game by the BBC, GamesRadar+, Gamereactor, and Guinness World Records. Due to the split among reliable sources, both games are listed in the number-one spot on this list.) The closest competitor to either is Grand Theft Auto V, which has sold 235 million copies. The best-selling single-platform game is Wii Sports, with nearly 83 million sales for the Wii console. (Note: Wii Sports was bundled with the Wii console in all regions except Japan. Nintendo includes those bundles in the overall sales figure.)

== Criteria ==
The 1998 game Snake is estimated to have shipped on over 400 million devices, but is not listed as it was preinstalled and freely accessible on Nokia mobile phones.

For this list, standard re-releases, remasters and enhanced versions of games are considered iterative updates to the original, thus their sales are combined. In contrast, remakes generally contain significant deviations from the original and are considered separate products. Likewise, expansion packs are not combined with the base game to avoid inflating sales figures. Additionally, titles with unique release structures are classified based on their specific publishing context. Other metrics, such as "players" or "installs", typically refer to active users engaging with the game rather than sales, thus are not listed; even for paid games, these metrics could include free trials or other free promotions and cannot reliably be substituted for sales figures. Paid bundled titles are also included in this list; their sales often benefit from being packaged with other products, typically at a discounted price.

== List of best-selling games ==
The listed developers and publishers correspond to each game's original release, and release years refer only to the first full public launch, excluding any prerelease stages. Rankings serve solely for numbering purposes and are not meant to be precise, reflecting the list's limited scope because there is no credible, comprehensive sales-tracking source for the video game industry, unlike for films, which have box office tracking sites such as Box Office Mojo and The Numbers. Tied ranks are resolved using the standard competition ranking method, in which entries with equal figures share the same rank and following ranks are increased based on the number of tied entries.

Overview of best-selling video games
Rank	Title	Sales (millions)	Series	Platform(s)	Release year	Developer(s)	Publisher(s)	Ref.
1	Tetris	520	Tetris	Multi-platform	1988 (Note: The release date of the first Tetris games sold commercially. Earlier games were given out for free.)	Various	Various	
1	Minecraft	425	Minecraft	Multi-platform	2011 (Note: Although Minecraft was first publicly available on May 17, 2009, and fully released on November 18, 2011, the game first accepted pre-orders on June 13, 2009, so it started accumulating sales at that time.)	Mojang Studios	Mojang Studios	
3	Grand Theft Auto V	235	Grand Theft Auto	Multi-platform	2013	Rockstar North	Rockstar Games	
4	Red Dead Redemption 2	89	Red Dead	Multi-platform	2018	Rockstar Games	Rockstar Games	
5	Wii Sports	82.9	Wii	Wii	2006	Nintendo EAD	Nintendo	
6	Mario Kart 8 / Deluxe	80.46	Mario Kart	Wii U / Switch	2014	Nintendo EAD / Nintendo EPD (Deluxe)	Nintendo	(Note: Mario Kart 8 sold 8.46 million units and Mario Kart 8 Deluxe sold 72 million units.)
7	PUBG: Battlegrounds	75	PUBG Universe	Multi-platform	2017	PUBG Studios	Krafton	
8	Terraria	70	None	Multi-platform	2011	Re-Logic	Re-Logic / 505 Games	
9	The Elder Scrolls V: Skyrim	65	The Elder Scrolls	Multi-platform	2011	Bethesda Game Studios	Bethesda Softworks	
9	The Witcher 3: Wild Hunt	65	The Witcher	Multi-platform	2015	CD Projekt Red	CD Projekt	
11	Super Mario Bros.	58	Super Mario	Multi-platform	1985	Nintendo R&D4	Nintendo	
11	Human: Fall Flat	58	None	Multi-platform	2016	No Brakes Games	Curve Digital	
13	Animal Crossing: New Horizons	50.63	Animal Crossing	Nintendo Switch	2020	Nintendo EPD	Nintendo	
14	The Sims	50	The Sims	Multi-platform	2000	Maxis	Electronic Arts	
14	Stardew Valley	50	None	Multi-platform	2016	ConcernedApe	Chucklefish / ConcernedApe	
14	Overwatch	50	Overwatch	Multi-platform	2016	Blizzard Entertainment	Blizzard Entertainment	
17	Pokémon Red / Blue / Yellow	47.44	Pokémon	Multi-platform	1996	Game Freak	Nintendo	(Note: Red and Blue versions sold 31.3 million units, the Yellow version sold 14.64 million units on Game Boy, and all versions sold a combined 1.5 million units on Nintendo 3DS Virtual Console.)
18	Wii Fit / Plus	43.8	Wii	Wii	2007	Nintendo EAD	Nintendo	(Note: Wii Fit sold 22.67 million units and Wii Fit Plus sold 21.13 million units.)
19	Call of Duty: Black Ops III	43	Call of Duty	Multi-platform	2015	Treyarch	Activision	
20	Call of Duty: Modern Warfare	41	Call of Duty	Multi-platform	2019	Infinity Ward	Activision	
21	Sonic the Hedgehog	40	Sonic the Hedgehog	Multi-platform	1991	Sonic Team	Sega	
21	Payday 2	40	Payday	Multi-platform	2013	Overkill Software	505 Games	
21	Cyberpunk 2077	40	Cyberpunk	Multi-platform	2020	CD Projekt Red	CD Projekt	
21	Hogwarts Legacy	40	Wizarding World	Multi-platform	2023	Avalanche Software	Warner Bros. Games	
25	Super Smash Bros. Ultimate	38.5	Super Smash Bros.	Nintendo Switch	2018	Bandai Namco Studios / Sora Ltd.	Nintendo	
26	Mario Kart Wii	37.38	Mario Kart	Wii	2008	Nintendo EAD	Nintendo	
27	The Legend of Zelda: Breath of the Wild	35.98	The Legend of Zelda	Multi-platform	2017	Nintendo EPD	Nintendo	(Note: The Legend of Zelda: Breath of the Wild sold 34.28 million units on Nintendo Switch, and 1.70 million units on Wii U.)
28	Fallout 4	35	Fallout	Multi-platform	2015	Bethesda Game Studios	Bethesda Softworks	
29	Wii Sports Resort	33.14	Wii	Wii	2009	Nintendo EAD	Nintendo	
30	Grand Theft Auto VI	32.5	Grand Theft Auto	Multi-platform	2026	Rockstar Games	Rockstar Games	
31	Super Mario Odyssey	31.06	Super Mario	Nintendo Switch	2017	Nintendo EPD	Nintendo	
32	Borderlands 2	31	Borderlands	Multi-platform	2012	Gearbox Software	2K Games	
33	New Super Mario Bros.	30.8	Super Mario	Nintendo DS	2006	Nintendo EAD	Nintendo	
33	Monster Hunter: World	30.8	Monster Hunter	Multi-platform	2018	Capcom	Capcom	(Note: Monster Hunter: World sold 22.5 million units, while the Iceborne Master Edition—which includes both the base game and its expansion pack, Iceborne—helped total sales reach 30.8 million units.)
35	New Super Mario Bros. Wii	30.32	Super Mario	Wii	2009	Nintendo EAD	Nintendo	
36	Pokémon Gold / Silver / Crystal	30.12	Pokémon	Game Boy Color	1999	Game Freak	Nintendo	(Note: Gold and Silver versions sold 23.73 million units and the Crystal version sold 6.39 million units.)
37	Phasmophobia	30	None	Multi-platform	2020 (Note: Phasmophobia entered early access in September 2020 on PC through Steam, with console versions releasing in early access in 2024. As of 2026, the game remains in early access.)	Kinetic Games	Kinetic Games	
37	Call of Duty: Black Ops Cold War	30	Call of Duty	Multi-platform	2020	Treyarch / Raven Software	Activision	
37	It Takes Two	30	None	Multi-platform	2021	Hazelight Studios	Electronic Arts	
37	Elden Ring	30	Elden Ring	Multi-platform	2022	FromSoftware	Bandai Namco	
41	Pokémon Scarlet / Violet	28.66	Pokémon	Nintendo Switch	2022	Game Freak	Nintendo / The Pokémon Company	
42	Duck Hunt	28.3	None	Famicom / NES	1984	Nintendo R&D1	Nintendo	
43	Wii Play	28.02	Wii	Wii	2006	Nintendo EAD	Nintendo	
44	Black Myth: Wukong	28	Black Myth	Multi-platform	2024	Game Science	Game Science	
45	Grand Theft Auto: San Andreas	27.5	Grand Theft Auto	Multi-platform	2004	Rockstar North	Rockstar Games	
46	Pokémon Sword / Shield	27.36	Pokémon	Nintendo Switch	2019	Game Freak	Nintendo / The Pokémon Company	
47	Call of Duty: Modern Warfare 3	26.5	Call of Duty	Multi-platform	2011	Infinity Ward / Sledgehammer	Activision	
48	Call of Duty: Black Ops	26.2	Call of Duty	Multi-platform	2010	Treyarch	Activision	
49	Pokémon Sun / Moon / Ultra Sun / Ultra Moon	25.62	Pokémon	Nintendo 3DS	2016	Game Freak	Nintendo / The Pokémon Company	(Note: Sun and Moon sold 16.34 million units and Ultra Sun and Ultra Moon sold 9.28 million units.)
50	Garry's Mod	25.56	None	PC	2006	Facepunch Studios	Valve	

== See also ==
- List of best-selling video game franchises
- List of best-selling video games in the United States by year
- Lists of best-selling video games by platform
- List of best-selling Nintendo video games
- List of best-selling game consoles
- List of most-played mobile games by player count
- List of highest-grossing arcade games
- List of highest-grossing media franchises
