= Knuckle (disambiguation) =

A knuckle is a joint of the finger.

Knuckle or knuckles may also refer to:

== Arts, entertainment, and media ==
- Knuckle (film) a 2011 documentary about bare knuckle boxing in Ireland
- Knuckle Bine, a character from the anime/manga series Hunter × Hunter
- Knuckles the Echidna, a recurring character from the Sonic the Hedgehog video game series
  - Knuckles the Echidna (comics), American comic book series
  - Knuckles (TV series), television miniseries

== Biology and anatomy ==
- Knuckles, the dorsal crenulations (bumps) of the gray whale where most whales have a dorsal fin
- Knuckle-walking, a form of quadrupedal walking in which the forelimbs hold the fingers in a partially flexed posture that allows body weight to press down on the ground through the knuckle
- Pork knuckle, a part of a pig's leg used as the basis of the traditional German dish Eisbein

== People with the name ==
- Knuckles Boyle (1909-1943), American football player
- Frankie Knuckles (1955–2014), American DJ, record producer, and remixer
- Willis Knuckles (1946–2014), Liberia politician

== Other ==
- Brass knuckles (also called knuckles), weapons used in hand-to-hand combat
- Knuckle coupler, a railway coupling, a mechanism for connecting rolling stock in a train
- Knuckle joint (mechanical), used to connect the two rods which are under the tensile load
- Knuckles Mountain Range, Sri Lanka

== See also ==
- Knuckle Sandwich (disambiguation)
- Knuckleball, or knuckler, a baseball pitch
