= Ged Wright =

- Born: Ged Maxwell Wright
- Occupations: Visual effects artist Director
- Years active: 2003-present

Ged Maxwell Wright is a visual effects artist and director. He was nominated at the 83rd Academy Awards for his work on the film Iron Man 2. This was in the category of Best Visual Effects. For which his nomination was shared with Janek Sirrs, Ben Snow and Dan Sudick. It lost to Inception. He has also directed an episode of the Paramount+ miniseries Knuckles.

== Filmography ==
=== Visual effects ===
Year	Title	Role	Notes
2002	Harry Potter and the Chamber of Secrets	Digital Artist: Double Negative	Uncredited
2003	The League of Extraordinary Gentlemen	Lead 3D Artist: Double Negative	
2003	Dreamkeeper	Digital Artist	Television film
2004	The Chronicles of Riddick	Digital Artist: Double Negative	
2005	Batman Begins	Digital Artist: DNEG	
2005	Harry Potter and the Goblet of Fire	Visual Effects: Double Negative	
2007	Harry Potter and the Order of the Phoenix	Lead Visual Effects Artist: Double Negative	
2008	10,000	CQ Sequence Supervisor: Double Negative	
2008	Quantum of Solace	Visual Effects Supervisor: Double Negative	
2010	Iron Man 2	Visual Effects Supervisor: Double Negative	
2011	Attack the Block	Visual Effects Supervisor	
2011	The Tree of Life	Digital Artist: Double Negative	
2012	John Carter	Digital Artist: Double Negative	Uncredited
2013	Man of Steel	Visual Effects Supervisor: Double Negative	
2013	The Vatican	Visual Effects Supervisor	Television film
2014	Muppets Most Wanted	Visual Effects Supervisor	
2014	Godzilla	Visual Effects Supervisor	
2015	Insurgent	Visual Effects Supervisor: Double Negative	
2016	Assassin's Creed	Visual Effects Supervisor	
2018	22 July	Visual Effects Supervisor	
2020	Sonic the Hedgehog	Production Visual Effects Supervisor	
2022	Sonic the Hedgehog 2	Production Visual Effects Supervisor	
2024	Sonic the Hedgehog 3	Production Visual Effects Supervisor	Also co-producer and second unit director

=== Director ===
Year	Title	Notes
2024	Knuckles	Miniseries; Episode "Don’t Ever Say I Wasn’t There For You"
