= Gargamel (disambiguation) =

Gargamel is the villain of the comic strip and animated TV series The Smurfs.

Gargamel may also refer to:

- Gargamel!, an American rock band
- Gargamel, a reggae artist better known as Buju Banton
- Gargamelle, giantess and mother of Gargantua in Gargantua and Pantagruel
- Gargamelle, a bubble chamber particle detector at CERN, named for the giantess
