= Nuckles =

Nuckles can refer to:

- Misspelling of knuckles, part of the hand
- Nuckles, Arkansas, an unincorporated community
- Georg Nückles (born 1948), a German sprinter
- Samuel Nuckles (fl. 1868–1872), an American legislator
- William Nuckles Doak (1882–1933), an American politician

== See also ==
- NuckleDu, an American gamer
- Otto Nückel (1888–1955), a German graphic artist
- Knuckles (disambiguation)
- Nickles (disambiguation)
