= Flames of Disaster =

Flames of Disaster may refer to:

- The Flames of Disaster, a plot element in the 2006 video game Sonic the Hedgehog
- "The Flames of Disaster", an episode of the 2024 television series Knuckles
