= Knuckle Sandwich =

Knuckle Sandwich may refer to:

- Knuckle sandwich, an idiom for a punch in the mouth

== Music ==
- "Knuckle Sandwich", a 2003 song by Danger Mouse and Jemini from Ghetto Pop Life
- "Knuckle's Sandwich", a 2007 song by Gargamel!
- KnuckleSandwich Records, founded by Scott H. Biram

== Other uses ==
- Knuckle Sandwich (video game), a 2023 role-playing game
- Knuckle Sandwich, a 2004 film starring Morgan Fairchild and Eric Stonestreet
