= DC League of Super-Pets =

2022 American animated superhero film by Jared Stern

- Theatrical release poster
- Directed by: Jared Stern
- Written by: Jared Stern; John Whittington
- Based on: Characters from DC
- Produced by: Patricia Hicks; Dwayne Johnson; Dany Garcia; Hiram Garcia; Jared Stern
- Starring: Dwayne Johnson; Kevin Hart; Kate McKinnon; John Krasinski; Vanessa Bayer; Natasha Lyonne; Diego Luna; Marc Maron; Thomas Middleditch; Ben Schwartz; Keanu Reeves
- Edited by: David Egan; Jhoanne Reyes
- Music by: Steve Jablonsky
- Production companies: Warner Animation Group; DC Entertainment; Seven Bucks Productions
- Distributed by: Warner Bros. Pictures
- Release dates: July 13, 2022 (AMC The Grove); July 29, 2022 (United States)
- Running time: 105 minutes
- Country: United States
- Language: English
- Budget: $90 million
- Box office: $207.6 million

DC League of Super-Pets is a 2022 American animated superhero film based on DC Comics characters. It was directed by Jared Stern, who co-wrote it with John Whittington. Dwayne Johnson stars as the voice of Krypto, alongside a supporting ensemble voice cast that includes Kevin Hart, Kate McKinnon, John Krasinski, Vanessa Bayer, Natasha Lyonne, Diego Luna, Marc Maron, Thomas Middleditch, Ben Schwartz, and Keanu Reeves. It tells the story of Superman's pet dog Krypto and shelter dog Ace who work with other animals to save captured superheroes from Lex Luthor and Lulu.

During the early days of Warner Animation Group, Stern pitched the film in 2012, after working in an animal shelter, where he noticed how older animals were less likely to be adopted and wondered about the idea of those pets having superpowers. He was hired to write and direct a film about DC's Legion of Super-Pets in July 2018. Sam J. Levine and Patricia Hicks joined the project in January 2019 as co-director and producer, respectively. Johnson was signed on to voice Krypto in May 2021, while other main cast members were confirmed to join the voice roles by June 2021, including Hart, McKinnon, Krasinski, Bayer, Lyonne, Luna, Maron, and Reeves. The inspiration for the film's animation style came from Art Deco architecture and illustrator J.C. Leyendecker. The animation was provided by Animal Logic.

DC League of Super-Pets premiered at the AMC The Grove in Los Angeles, California on July 13, 2022, and was released in the United States by Warner Bros. Pictures on July 29. The film received generally positive reviews from critics and grossed over $207 million worldwide on a $90 million budget. DC League of Super-Pets was the last fully animated film to be released under the Warner Animation Group label before being renamed Warner Bros. Pictures Animation in 2023.

== Plot ==
Superman, who grows up with a Kryptonian Labrador Retriever named Krypto, goes by the name Clark Kent in everyday life. Krypto feels jealous when Superman starts dating Lois Lane, so Superman goes to an animal shelter to find Krypto a friend. A Boxer named Ace tries to escape the shelter, but Krypto stops him. Later, Superman and Krypto spot their archenemy, LexCorp CEO Lex Luthor, reeling in a meteor strapped with orange kryptonite with a tractor beam, intending to gain superpowers. He is easily defeated as the two are aided by the Justice League, formed by Superman himself, Batman, Wonder Woman, The Flash, Green Lantern, Cyborg, and Aquaman.

Meanwhile, Lulu, a guinea pig test subject from LexCorp sent to the shelter who is blindly loyal to Luthor, reels in a piece of orange kryptonite with her own tractor beam, which gives her telekinesis and allows her to escape the shelter, setting it ablaze while doing so. Unbeknownst to her, everyone else in the shelter is exposed to the orange kryptonite and gains superpowers: Ace is now super-strong and nigh-invulnerable; PB, a potbellied pig, can change size; Merton, a nearsighted turtle, becomes super-fast; and Chip, a paranoid squirrel, gains electrokinesis. Using their new powers, they escape the burning shelter. While at home, Superman and Krypto have an argument when the former plans to propose marriage to Lois. However, Clark is captured by Lulu when she weakens him with kryptonite. Krypto tries to save him, but loses his powers after unknowingly eating a shard of green kryptonite hidden inside a piece of Jarlsberg cheese. Later, Krypto comes across the shelter pets, who agree to help him.

Meanwhile, Lulu gives powers to and recruits a group of guinea pigs, captures the Justice League, and heads to Stryker's Island to free Luthor. The shelter pets try to stop her, but fail miserably; in the process, Lulu taunts Krypto about Clark's engagement plans and even shows him the engagement ring. They regroup in the Hall of Justice, where Ace reveals to a distraught Krypto that he used to have owners as a puppy: a family with a toddler. One day, when the wandering toddler was about to fall down a flight of steps, Ace grabbed her arm with his mouth to pull her to safety. Upon seeing the bite-marks, the parents assumed Ace attacked her and sent him to the shelter, though Ace stands by his actions and ideals. Encouraged, Krypto leads the pets to LexCorp. While there, a kitten named Whiskers, (who Lulu rescued from the shelter after she set it ablaze the night she and the others gained their powers) who can now create weapons at will, attacks them, but the team traps her. At Stryker's Island, the shelter pets confront Lulu, but put themselves in prison cells when she threatens to kill Krypto. Lulu frees Luthor, who then betrays her and locks her in his cell while freeing Mercy Graves. Lulu breaks out easily and decides to destroy the Justice League and Luthor herself.

The Kryptonite shard passes through Krypto's system, restoring his powers. He breaks himself and the other super pets out of prison, and attempts to free the Justice League, but Lulu launches them into space along with Luthor, betraying her remaining henchmen while doing so. In order to stall Krypto, she attempts to kill Lois. However, the other super pets rescue the Justice League while Krypto saves Lois and defeats Lulu, but she absorbs the orange kryptonite, becoming a mutated kaiju-sized version of herself. The League and the pets team up to stop her, but she gains the upper-hand. Realizing Lulu has become too powerful, Krypto decides to use the "Solar Paw Punch", a move that can defeat any supervillain, but will kill the user. The attack causes a massive explosion that knocks the kryptonite out of Lulu's system, causing her to lose her powers and return to normal size while Krypto accepts his fate. Ace uses his invulnerability to save him. Shortly after, Lulu's redeemed henchmen, Mark and Keith, trap her in a hot dog stand for her crimes and betrayal.

In the aftermath, Krypto allows Clark to marry Lois. The shelter pets, Mark, and Keith get adopted by the rest of the Justice League: Ace by Batman, PB by Wonder Woman, Merton by The Flash, Chip by Green Lantern, Mark by Cyborg and Keith by Aquaman. Sometime later, the pets have formed their own superhero team called the "League of Super-Pets".

In a mid-credits scene, Luthor is still trapped in his prison asking any passing super-animals to free him, without success. Meanwhile, Lulu is freed by Mercy, who adopts her. In a post-credits scene, Krypto and Superman encounter Black Adam and his dog, Anubis, but Krypto tricks them into flying to Pluto.

== Voice cast ==
- Dwayne Johnson as Krypto, a Kryptonian Labrador Retriever and Superman's pet dog.
  - Johnson also voices Anubis, Black Adam's pet dog who hates when people refer to his owner as a villain instead of an antihero.
  - Johnson also voices Black Adam, an anti-hero who appears in the post-credits ending, teasing his then-upcoming role in the DC Extended Universe.
- Kevin Hart as Ace, a Boxer mix who gains super strength and nigh-invulnerability after coming in contact with orange Kryptonite. He later becomes Batman's pet dog. According to Krypto, in sarcastic terms; he is 7/8 Chihuahua.
- Kate McKinnon as Lulu, an evil skinny pig who gains flight and telekinesis through orange Kryptonite. Originally had a blind allegiance towards Lex Luthor, she later becomes Mercy Graves' pet.
- John Krasinski as Clark Kent / Superman, a superhero from Krypton who protects Metropolis and Krypto's owner.
- Vanessa Bayer as PB, a potbellied pig who gains the ability to change her size in scale after coming in contact with the orange Kryptonite and is a major superhero fan, but mostly idolizes Wonder Woman, whose pet she becomes later.
- Natasha Lyonne as Merton, a red-eared terrapin with poor eyesight who gains super speed after coming in contact with orange Kryptonite. She later becomes Flash's pet.
- Diego Luna as Chip, a paranoid red squirrel who gains electrokinesis after coming in contact with orange Kryptonite and speaks with a strong Spanish accent. He later becomes the Green Lantern (Jessica Cruz)'s pet.
- Marc Maron as Lex Luthor, the CEO of LexCorp and Superman's arch-nemesis.
- Keanu Reeves as Bruce Wayne / Batman, a vigilante superhero who protects Gotham City. He later becomes Ace's owner.
- Thomas Middleditch as Keith, a white guinea pig who was recruited by Lulu and empowered by orange Kryptonite, gaining cryokinesis (the ability to manipulate ice). He later becomes Aquaman's pet and joins the team.
  - Julia Morris portrays Keith in the Australian version.
- Ben Schwartz as Mark, a brown guinea pig who was recruited by Lulu and empowered by orange Kryptonite, gaining pyrokinesis. He later becomes Cyborg's pet and joins the team.
  - Chris Brown portrays Mark in the Australian release.
- Olivia Wilde as Lois Lane, a reporter of the Daily Planet and Clark's girlfriend.
- Jameela Jamil as Diana Prince / Wonder Woman, an Amazon princess and superheroine from Themyscira. She later becomes PB's owner.
- Jemaine Clement as Arthur Curry / Aquaman, an Atlantean demigod, superhero, and the king of Atlantis. He later becomes Keith's owner.
- John Early as Barry Allen / The Flash, a police forensic scientist and superhero who protects Central City with his immense superspeed. He later becomes Merton's owner.
- Daveed Diggs as Victor Stone / Cyborg, a former football player and superhero who gained cybernetics after an accident. He later becomes Mark's owner.
- Dascha Polanco as Jessica Cruz / Green Lantern, a superheroine and member of the Green Lantern Corps. She later becomes Chip's owner.
- Keith David as Dog-El, Krypto's father.
- Sam J. Levine as the Robot Guards at Stryker's Island.
  - Levine also voices Waffles, a Boston Terrier who interacts with Krypto in the park.
    - Richard Arnold portrays Waffles in the UK version.
    - Sean Lee portrays Waffles in the Malaysian English version.
- Maya Erskine as Mercy Graves, Lex Luthor's henchwoman and bodyguard. She later becomes Lulu's owner.
- Yvette Nicole Brown as Patty, the owner of an animal shelter.
- Alfred Molina as Jor-El, Superman's biological father.
- Lena Headey as Lara, Superman's biological mother.
- Busy Philipps as Foofy Dog, a dog who interacts with Krypto in the park.
- Dan Fogler as Carl, Patty's assistant who constantly tries to hit on her.
  - Fogler also plays Pilot
  - Fogler also voices Racer
- Winona Bradshaw as Whiskers, a kitten with weapon abilities who tries to kill the Super-Pets for Lulu as a thank you for rescuing her. She appears later in a mid-credits scene where Luthor is still trapped in the park as she passes by him.
- David Pressman as a Welsh Corgi waiting outside the shelter with Krypto, who later gains size manipulation and a Doctor Manhattan inspired appearance.
  - Munya Chawawa portrays the corgi in the UK version.
- Jared Stern as a guy in a bathtub whose bath keeps getting disrupted by the animals.
  - Stern also voices JLA Hotline
- Michelle Morgan as the A.I. for Lex Luthor's Mech Suit
- Amanda Ames as Guinea-Pigasus, a guinea pig who was recruited by Lulu and empowered by Orange Kryptonite, which gave her the wings and hindquarters of a bird.
- Gavin McCrillis as Black Kitten
- Andre Hyland as Storm
- Mark Walton as Topo

== Production ==
=== Development ===
In July 2018, Jared Stern was hired to write and direct an animated film about DC's Legion of Super-Pets. In January 2019, it was announced that Sam J. Levine would serve as co-director with Stern, and that Patricia Hicks had signed on as producer. The film was pitched by Stern in 2012, during the early days of the Warner Animation Group.

In May 2021, it was announced that Dwayne Johnson would star as the voice of Krypto the Superdog. In addition to starring in the film, he, alongside Dany Garcia, Hiram Garcia, and Stern would be joining Hicks as producers; while John Requa, Glenn Ficarra, and Nicholas Stoller were set to executive produce.

In June 2021, additional cast members were announced, with Kevin Hart starring as the voice of Ace the Bat-Hound in the film. Additionally, Kate McKinnon, John Krasinski, Vanessa Bayer, Natasha Lyonne, Diego Luna, and Keanu Reeves were cast in undisclosed roles. The following week, Jameela Jamil joined the film. By September 2021, Marc Maron had joined the cast as the voice of Lex Luthor. By November of the same year, additional roles were revealed to be: Chip, Green Lantern's squirrel (Luna); Merton, The Flash's turtle (Lyonne); PB, Wonder Woman's pig (Bayer), Superman (Krasinski) and newer additions, Thomas Middleditch and Ben Schwartz. In March 2022, Reeves was revealed to be voicing Batman. The following month, it was revealed that Dascha Polanco would be voicing Jessica Cruz / Green Lantern. Three weeks before the film's release, the remainder of the cast for the Justice League and Lois Lane were announced in July 2022 through posters.

=== Writing ===
Stern developed a pitch for the film after working in an animal shelter, where he noticed how older animals were less likely to be adopted and wondered "what if those pets got superpowers?". Stern was originally unsure what DC characters he was allowed to incorporate in the film, though he added Luthor after the character was suggested by DC. This led to the concept of the villain, Lulu, being a guinea pig, as Stern felt "guinea pigs are someone who would have a chip on their shoulder" due to them being used as test subjects, and Lulu being Lex's test subject served as a parallel with Krypto and Superman's relationship.

According to Stern, DC executives suggested adding satirical jokes regarding their properties, which Stern felt allowed the film to make fun of the characters while portraying them respectfully. Stern said the humor regarding DC characters was meant to be rooted in the film's focus on pets, such as portraying Superman as a dog owner or Batman as "a guy who really could use a pet". Early drafts for the movie had Ace in a more prominent role, but his role was changed to co-lead once the filmmakers concluded the focus for the film should be on Krypto's relationship with Superman.

=== Animation ===
The animation was provided by Animal Logic in Sydney and Vancouver, which also provided animation for the Warner Animation Group's The Lego Movie series. Approximately 70 animators worked on the film. Animators worked on the film for 2 years, as well as an extra 3–4 months after the film's release date was delayed by a year.

The film's art style was inspired by Art Deco architecture and illustrator J.C. Leyendecker, as well as the Art Deco style from the original Superman comics. Stern wanted the characters and environments to have both visible brushstrokes and "chunky heroic shapes". Character designers Mayumi Nose and Matt Williamês drew inspiration from the Super Friends animated series and Superman comics from the Silver Age of Comic Books for the designs of the characters, while still having a comedic edge to them.

The artists aimed for the film's visuals to reflect the optimistic tone from the Superman comic books, while also being relatable and cartoonish. In order to accomplish this, they had the visuals to be mainly vertical and have a "painted feel". The artists were influenced by the Superman comics from the Golden Age of Comic Books, particularly in those comics' painting style.

=== Music ===
The film's original score was composed by Steve Jablonsky. The film's score album was released on July 29, 2022, by WaterTower Music. The Taylor Swift songs "Message in a Bottle (Taylor's Version)" and a re-recording of the song "Bad Blood", "Bad Blood (Taylor's Version)", are also featured in the film; along with other songs on the soundtrack, Queen's "You're My Best Friend", Sturgill Simpson's "Sing Along", R.E.M.'s cover of "Superman", A Tribe Called Quest's "Electric Relaxation", The Pharcyde's "Passin' Me By", Bill Beach's "Tudo É Relativo", Europe's "The Final Countdown", Percy Faith & His Orchestra's "Theme from A Summer Place", Burt Bacharach's "What the World Needs Now Is Love", The Chemical Brothers' "Block Rockin' Beats" and Canned Heat's "Let's Work Together."

Also included is the original ballad "Count On Me", written and produced by Jeremy Silver and performed by Jac Ross. The song plays during an emotional flashback montage sequence where Ace used to have an idyllic home life with a family.

The soundtrack intermittently features themes of other superhero films from John Williams' "Theme from Superman (Main Title)", Danny Elfman's "Batman Theme (Main Title)" to Charles Fox and Norman Gimbel's "Wonder Woman Theme" from the popular 1970s television series and one other cinematic soundtrack song, Charles Bernstein's "Jump Rope" from A Nightmare on Elm Street, as sung by Whiskers as she hunts down the Super-Pets in a dead-end street.

== Marketing ==
=== Merchandise ===
On May 24, 2022, Warner Bros. Consumer Products and DC Comics announced the release of merchandise inspired by the film in collaboration with several partners, including global master toy licensee Mattel (via Fisher-Price). The products include apparel, pet accessories, toys, collectibles, costumes and furniture. McDonald's also announced that their Happy Meals would have toys based on the film in several markets.

== Release ==
In January 2019, the film was scheduled to be released on May 21, 2021. The release date was later pushed back to May 20, 2022, in favor of The Matrix Resurrections, another WB film starring Reeves. It was then pushed back to July 29, 2022 (taking the release of Black Adam, which also stars Johnson), among other films from Warner Bros. getting pushed due to production delays. DC League of Super-Pets premiered in Los Angeles on July 13, 2022. This was the final production under the name Warner Animation Group before the studio's rebranding in June 2023.

It was eligible to become available on HBO Max and/or premium video on demand on September 26, 2022, under a plan announced by WarnerMedia in 2021, though subsequent announcements by new parent company Warner Bros. Discovery suggested that streaming timing would be considered on a "case-by-case" basis going forward; it eventually became available on digital on August 23, 2022, and available on 4K, Blu-ray, and DVD beginning on October 4, 2022, along with the official announcement that the film would be available on HBO Max on September 26, 2022.

An edited 10-minute version of the film was released in 4D in 2023.

== Reception ==
=== Box office ===
DC League of Super-Pets grossed $93.7 million in the United States and Canada, and $113.9 million in other territories, for a worldwide total of $207.6 million.

In the United States and Canada, DC League of Super-Pets was released alongside Vengeance, and was projected to gross $25–30 million from 4,300 theaters on its opening weekend. The film made $9.3 million on its first day, including $2.2 million from Thursday previews. It went on to debut to $23 million, topping the box office, though coming in below expectations. The film made $11.2 million in its sophomore weekend, finishing second behind newcomer Bullet Train. In its third weekend it made $7.1 million, staying in second place.

=== Critical response ===
On the review aggregator website Rotten Tomatoes, 72% of 150 critics' reviews are positive, with an average rating of 6.3/10. The website's critical consensus reads, "Although it never quite soars, DC League of Super-Pets is a more than satisfactory diversion for families in search of four-legged fun." Metacritic, which uses a weighted average, assigned the film a score of 56 out of 100, based on 28 critics, indicating "mixed or average" reviews. Audiences polled by CinemaScore gave the film an average grade of "A−" on an A+ to F scale, while those at PostTrak gave it 3.5 out of 5 stars.

Nell Minow writing for RogerEbert.com praised the "lively" voice talent, and called the script "smart, exciting, and very funny". Reviewer Dwight Brown wrote, "It doesn't break the mold. However, it is sly, wicked and so much fun. Kids will laugh at the antics. Adults will chuckle when they hear the puns, jokes, catty remarks and doggy banter." Peter Travers of ABC News wrote that while the movie "is not a revolution in animation. It gets the fun done for family audiences." Clarisse Loughrey of The Independent criticized its "limited imagination", adding: "The film is desperately craving an angle—one that certainly can't be fulfilled by the fact all the pet ownership jokes have already been used up by the Secret Life of Pets series."

=== Accolades ===
Accolades received by DC League of Super-Pets
Award	Date of ceremony	Category	Recipient	Result	Ref.
AACTA Awards	December 7, 2022	Best Visual Effects or Animation	Sharna Hackett, Feargal Stewart, Christian So, Miles Green, and Etienne Marc	Nominated	
Critics' Choice Super Awards	March 16, 2023	Best Superhero Movie	DC League of Super-Pets	Nominated	
Golden Trailer Awards	October 6, 2022	Best Animation/Family	"Krypto Hero" (Seismic Productions)	Nominated	
Golden Trailer Awards	June 29, 2023	Best Animation/Family Movie Poster	DC League of Super-Pets (Cold Open)	Nominated	
Hollywood Music in Media Awards	November 16, 2022	Best Original Score in an Animated Film	Steve Jablonsky	Nominated	
NAACP Image Awards	February 25, 2023	Outstanding Animated Motion Picture	DC League of Super-Pets	Nominated	
NAACP Image Awards	February 25, 2023	Outstanding Motion Picture Voice Performance	Kevin Hart	Nominated	
Nickelodeon Kids' Choice Awards	March 4, 2023	Favorite Animated Movie	DC League of Super-Pets	Nominated	
Nickelodeon Kids' Choice Awards	March 4, 2023	Favorite Voice from an Animated Movie (Male)	Kevin Hart	Nominated	
Nickelodeon Kids' Choice Awards	March 4, 2023	Favorite Voice from an Animated Movie (Male)	Dwayne Johnson	Won	

== Future ==
In August 2022, following the positive financial and audience reception, Johnson stated that the film was intended to be the first installment of a new franchise.

== Adaptations ==
A video game based on the film titled DC League of Super-Pets: The Adventures of Krypto and Ace was announced during DC FanDome, and was released on July 15, 2022.

DC League of Super- Pets: The Great Mxy-Up is a tie-in comic taking place after the events in the movie, featuring Mr. Mxyzptlk.
