= John Whittington (screenwriter) =

American screenwriter

- Occupation: Screenwriter
- Years active: 2017–present
- Notable work: The Lego Batman Movie; The Lego Ninjago Movie; DC League of Super-Pets; Sonic the Hedgehog 2; Knuckles; Sonic the Hedgehog 3

John Whittington is an American screenwriter. He is known for his collaborations with Jared Stern, including The Lego Batman Movie (2017), The Lego Ninjago Movie (2017) and DC League of Super-Pets (2022), as well as his collaborations with Pat Casey and Josh Miller on Sonic the Hedgehog 2 and Sonic the Hedgehog 3. He later created Knuckles with Toby Ascher.

== Life and career ==
Whittington began his career by writing the screenplay for The Lego Batman Movie and The Lego Ninjago Movie. In July 2017, Whittington was hired to write the script for Boy21. In 2018, he wrote the screenplay for the Netflix film When We First Met. In 2019, he wrote two episodes of the animated series Green Eggs and Ham, based on the Dr. Seuss book of the same name. During reshoots, he rewrote the screenplay for the 2020 film Dolittle. He wrote the DC Comics film DC League of Super-Pets. He gained notability from co-writing the screenplay for the action adventure comedy film Sonic the Hedgehog 2 and its sequel. By 2025, he wrote the script for Swapped for Skydance Animation.

Whittington is a 2001 graduate of St. Stephen's and St. Agnes School and a 2005 graduate of New York University.

== Filmography ==
=== Film ===
Year	Title	Notes	Ref(s)
2017	The Lego Batman Movie	Co-wrote with Seth Grahame-Smith, Chris McKenna, Erik Sommers and Jared Stern	
2017	The Lego Ninjago Movie	Co-wrote with Bob Logan, Paul Fisher, William Wheeler, Tom Wheeler and Jared Stern	
2018	When We First Met		
2020	Dolittle	Reshoots only Screenplay by Stephen Gaghan, Dan Gregor and Doug Mand	
2022	Sonic the Hedgehog 2	Co-wrote with Pat Casey and Josh Miller	
2022	DC League of Super-Pets	Co-wrote with Jared Stern	
2024	Sonic the Hedgehog 3	Co-wrote with Pat Casey and Josh Miller	
2026	Swapped	Co-wrote with Adam Karp, Christian Magalhaes, Robert Snow, and Nathan Greno	
2026	Remarkably Bright Creatures	Co-wrote with Olivia Newman	

=== Television ===
Year	Title	Notes
2019–22	Green Eggs and Ham	Episodes: "Car", "Goat", "The Mom Identity", "You Only Mom Twice", "The Mom Who Loved Me"
2024	Knuckles	Creator; Also executive producer Miniseries; Episodes: "The Warrior", "Don't Ever Say I Wasn't There for You", "What Happens in Reno, Stays in Reno"

== Accolades ==
For his work on Green Eggs and Ham, he was nominated at the 47th Daytime Creative Arts Emmy Awards for "Outstanding Writing for an Animated Program".
