= Sonic the Hedgehog 3 (film) =

2024 film directed by Jeff Fowler

- Theatrical release poster
- Directed by: Jeff Fowler
- Screenplay by: Pat Casey; Josh Miller; John Whittington
- Story by: Pat Casey; Josh Miller
- Based on: Sonic the Hedgehog by Sega (Note: Sonic the Hedgehog was developed by Sonic Team, published by Sega, directed and programmed by Yuji Naka, designed by Hirokazu Yasuhara, and illustrated by Naoto Ohshima.)
- Produced by: Neal H. Moritz; Toby Ascher; Toru Nakahara; Hitoshi Okuno
- Starring: Jim Carrey; Ben Schwartz; Krysten Ritter; Lee Majdoub; Natasha Rothwell; Adam Pally; Shemar Moore; Colleen O'Shaughnessey; James Marsden; Tika Sumpter; Idris Elba; Keanu Reeves
- Cinematography: Brandon Trost
- Edited by: Al LeVine
- Music by: Tom Holkenborg
- Production companies: Original Film; Marza Animation Planet; Blur Studio
- Distributed by: Paramount Pictures
- Release dates: December 10, 2024 (Empire Leicester Square); December 20, 2024 (United States)
- Running time: 110 minutes
- Countries: United States; Japan
- Language: English
- Budget: $122 million
- Box office: $492.2 million

Sonic the Hedgehog 3 (Note: Known in Japan as Sonic x Shadow TOKYO MISSION (Japanese: ソニック × シャドウ TOKYO MISSION, Hepburn: Sonikku x Shadō: Tokyo Mission)) is a 2024 action-adventure comedy film based on the Sonic video game series. It is the third in the Sonic film series, it was directed by Jeff Fowler and written by Pat Casey, Josh Miller, and John Whittington. Jim Carrey, Ben Schwartz, Lee Majdoub, Natasha Rothwell, Adam Pally, Shemar Moore, Colleen O'Shaughnessey, James Marsden, Tika Sumpter, and Idris Elba reprise their roles, with Krysten Ritter and Keanu Reeves joining the cast. In the film, Sonic, Tails, and Knuckles face Shadow the Hedgehog (Reeves), who allies with the mad scientists Ivo and Gerald Robotnik to pursue revenge against humanity.

Sonic the Hedgehog 3 was announced in February 2022 during ViacomCBS's investor event before the release of Sonic the Hedgehog 2, with Fowler, the producer, and the writers returning. The plot draws elements from the video games Sonic Adventure 2 (2001) and Shadow the Hedgehog (2005), becoming darker than prior installments yet mindful of fan expectations and family appeal. Among the cast, Carrey returned for his appreciation for Ivo and the financial incentive, Reeves joined as Shadow due to his natural darkness and especially his performance in the John Wick films, and Alyla Browne was cast due to her performances in several George Miller films.

Due to the 2023 SAG-AFTRA strike, filming for animated characters began in September 2023, while filming with actors began that November in London, and production ended by March 2024. Brandon Trost returned as cinematographer. Animation for the film was produced in-house and with work split across five other external vendors, in tandem with the Knuckles series, with studio ownership of the assets making this possible. Tom Holkenborg returned to compose the original score, which incorporated the Crush 40 song "Live & Learn" from Sonic Adventure 2, and the singer Jelly Roll released the original song "Run It" to support the soundtrack.

Sonic the Hedgehog 3 premiered at the Empire Leicester Square in London on December 10, 2024, and was released by Paramount Pictures in the United States on December 20. It received generally positive reviews from critics, with praise for Carrey and Reeves's performances. The film was a box office success, grossing $492 million on a budget of $122 million, becoming the highest-grossing film in the franchise, the second highest-grossing video game film at the time of release, and the tenth-highest-grossing film of the year. Carrey won Favorite Villain at the 2025 Kids' Choice Awards. Sonic the Hedgehog 4 is scheduled for March 19, 2027.

== Plot ==
In 1974, a meteorite containing the alien hedgehog Shadow crash-lands in Oklahoma and is seized by the U.S. military. Shadow's power is experimented on by Professor Gerald Robotnik at a Guardian Units of Nations (G.U.N.) research facility under the supervision of Captain Walters; Shadow also develops a close friendship with Maria, Gerald's granddaughter. One night, as Gerald, Maria, and Shadow try to escape the facility to prevent Shadow from being taken away, Maria is accidentally killed in an explosion. Walters shuts down the facility, imprisons Gerald, and places Shadow in suspended animation.

In 2024, an unknown individual hacks into a G.U.N. prison facility's system off the coast of Japan and releases a vengeful Shadow. Sonic celebrates the anniversary of his arrival on Earth with Tails, Knuckles, and their adoptive parents Tom and Maddie Wachowski, in Green Hills, Montana. G.U.N. Director Rockwell arrives and recruits Sonic, Tails, and Knuckles (dubbed "Team Sonic") to help apprehend Shadow in Tokyo. However, he overpowers the three and escapes. Team Sonic meets with the now-Commander Walters, who informs them about Shadow's past. Suddenly, Dr. Ivo Robotnik's drones attack and fatally wound Walters, who gives Sonic a keycard before he dies. They decide to search for Shadow without G.U.N.'s help as Rockwell discovers the missing keycard and turns against them.

Team Sonic encounters Ivo's assistant, Agent Stone, who denies involvement in the attack; they form an uneasy alliance with Ivo and track the stolen drones to the abandoned G.U.N. facility. As Shadow captures Stone and Team Sonic, Ivo meets Gerald, his long-lost grandfather and the mastermind behind Shadow's escape and the stolen drones. Gerald explains that the keycard is one of two needed to activate the Eclipse Cannon, an orbiting laser space weapon he designed for G.U.N., capable of targeting and destroying any location on Earth. He claims that he plans to use it to destroy G.U.N.'s headquarters in London, and Ivo agrees to join him. Shadow takes the keycard from Tails and activates a black hole to destroy the base as he, the Robotniks, and Stone leave.

Team Sonic escapes using a ring portal and recruits Tom and Maddie to steal the second keycard from G.U.N.'s headquarters, contending with the Robotniks and Rockwell. Tom successfully obtains the keycard by disguising himself as Walters, but Shadow, buying into Tom's disguise and enraged at G.U.N., gravely wounds him, taking the key, allowing the Robotniks to launch the Eclipse Cannon. Enraged, Sonic abandons Tails and Knuckles, steals the Master Emerald, and becomes superpowered using the seven Chaos Emeralds contained within. Sonic confronts Shadow, who also absorbs the Chaos Emeralds' energy to become superpowered. Sonic eventually overpowers Shadow but relents upon realizing he was being consumed by revenge. Sonic tells Shadow about the loss of his guardian Longclaw (Note: As depicted in Sonic the Hedgehog (2020)) and that their love for the people they have lost is more important than revenge. Having a change of heart, Shadow agrees to stop the cannon.

Aboard the Eclipse Cannon, Gerald reveals to Ivo his intention to destroy Earth and themselves to avenge Maria's death. A horrified Ivo attempts to abort the firing sequence, preferring to rule over humanity rather than destroy it, but Gerald destroys the command console. Tails and Knuckles arrive, and the three knock Gerald into the reactor core, killing him. Sonic and Shadow block the cannon's beam as Ivo, Tails, and Knuckles steer it away from Earth, accidentally slicing off part of the Moon. Sonic loses his superpowered form and consciousness while blocking the cannon's beam with Shadow and falls back to Earth. Tails and Knuckles save Sonic using a ring portal to Green Hills. When the cannon's core begins to melt down, Ivo makes a final announcement acknowledging Stone as his only friend before he and Shadow sacrifice themselves to move it away from Earth before it explodes. Sonic reconciles with Tails and Knuckles while Tom recovers from his injuries.

During a race with Tails and Knuckles, Sonic accidentally ends up outside of New York, where he is ambushed by an army of Metal Sonics and saved by Amy Rose. Elsewhere, Shadow has survived the cannon's destruction.

== Cast ==
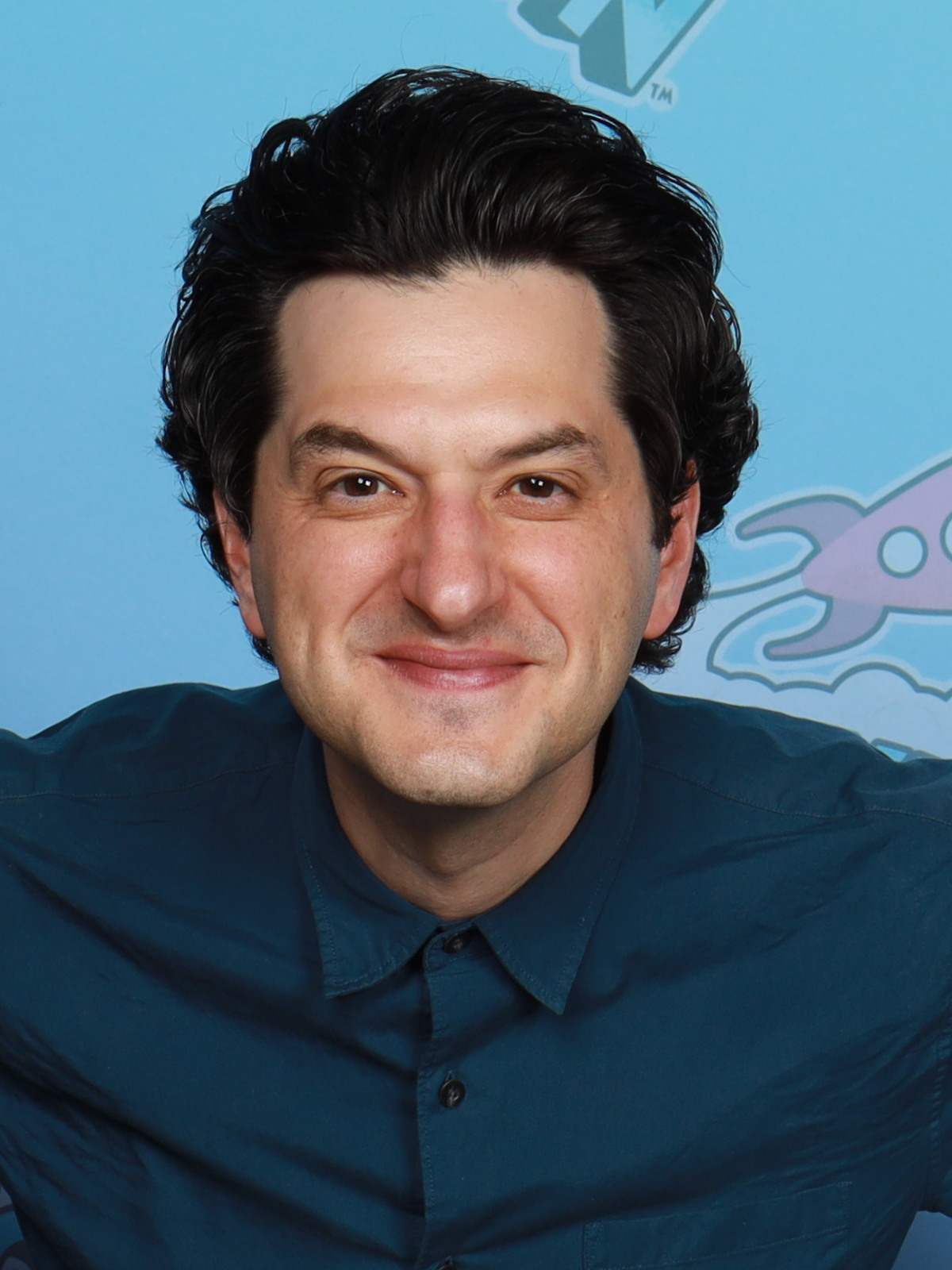
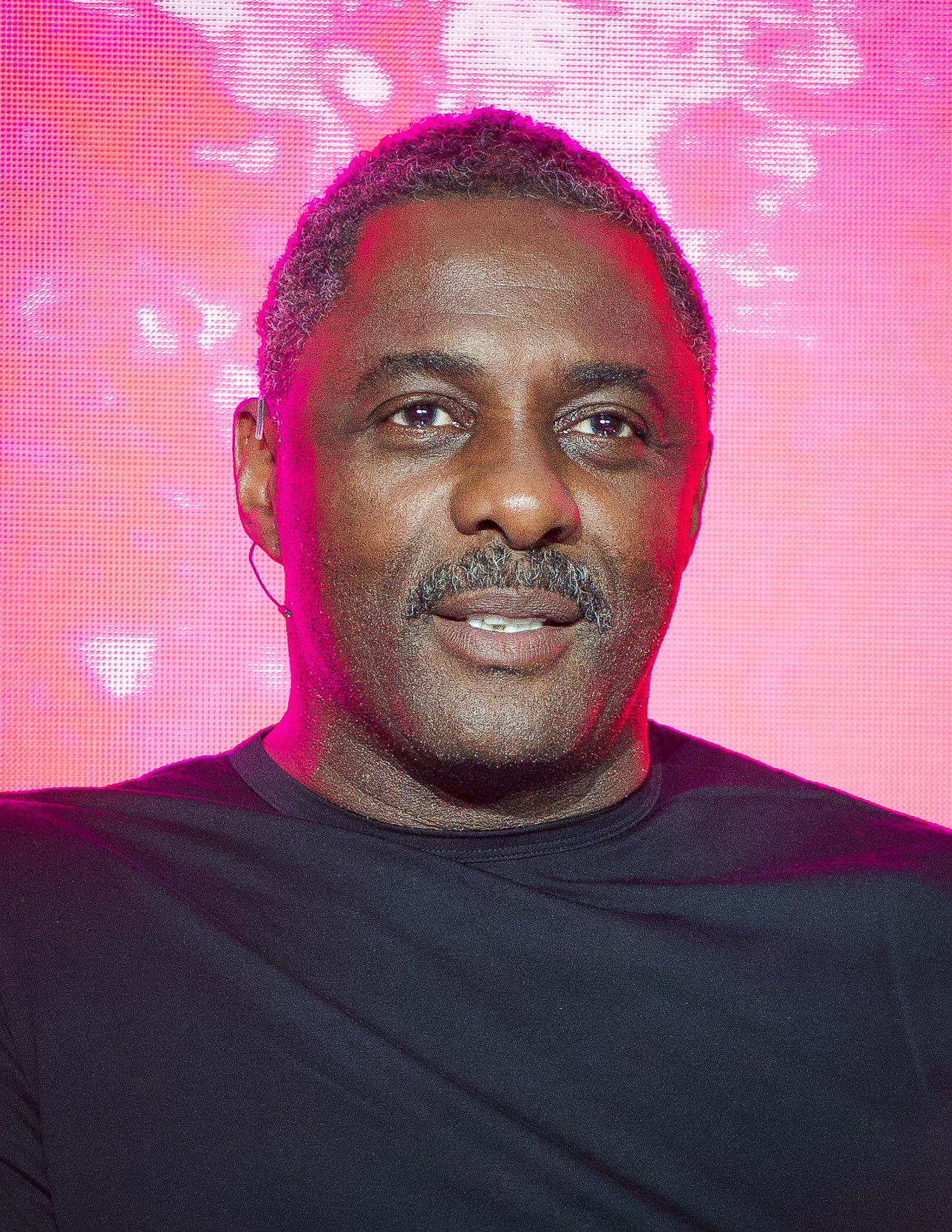
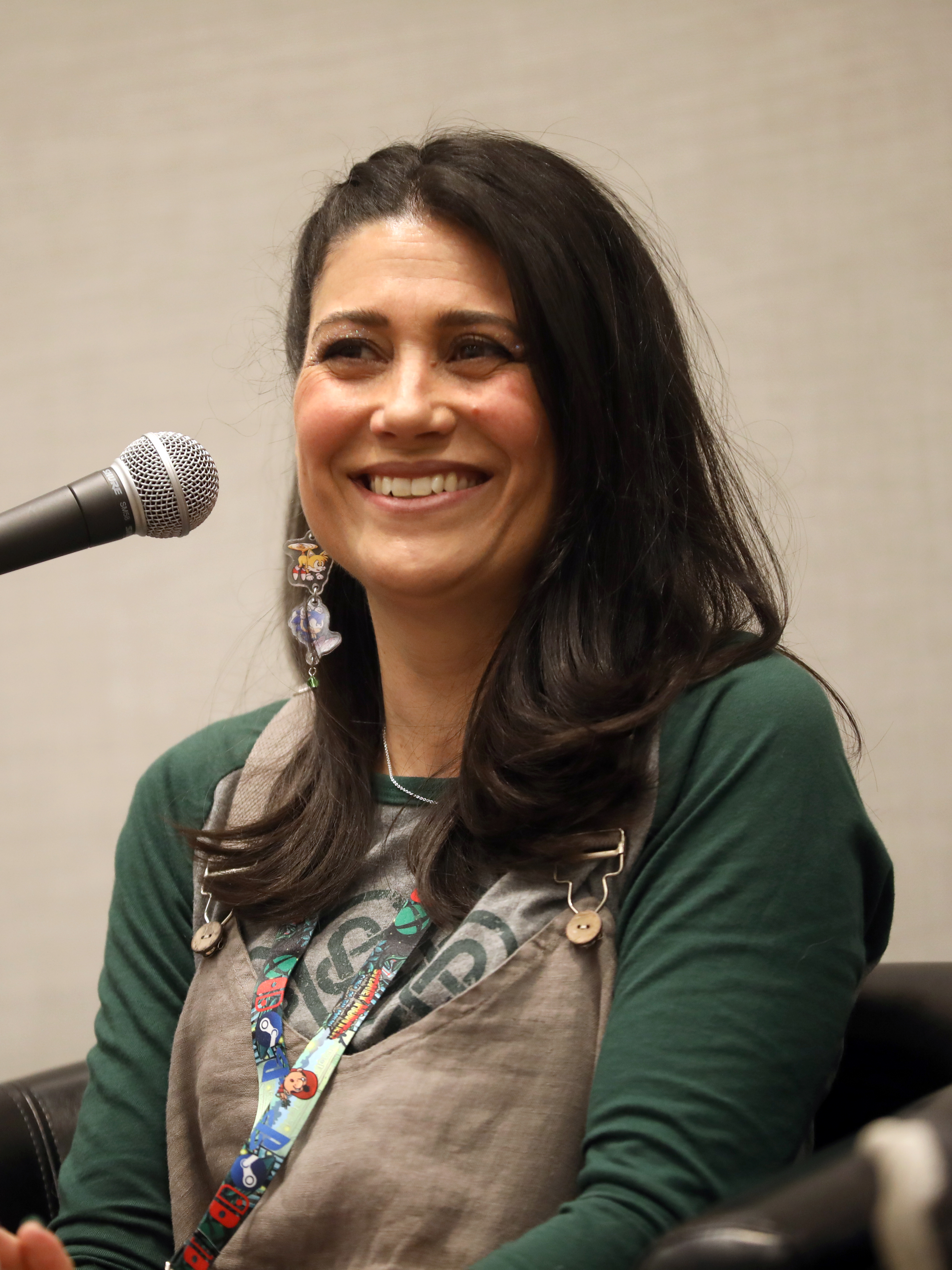
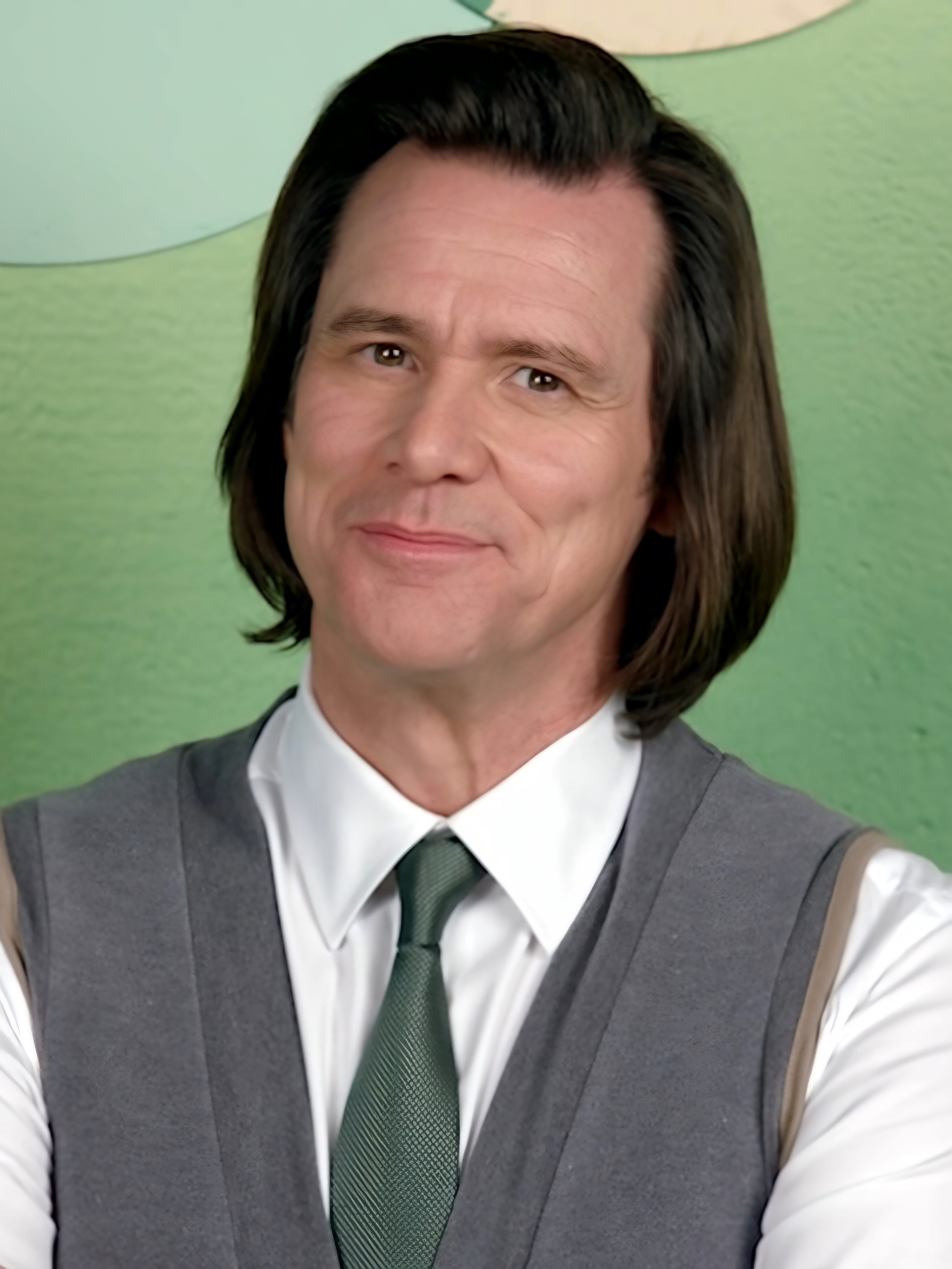
Ben Schwartz, Idris Elba, and Colleen O'Shaughnessey returned to Sonic the Hedgehog 3, voicing Sonic, Knuckles, and Tails respectively, while Jim Carrey returned as Ivo Robotnik and took the dual role of Ivo's grandfather Gerald after originally planning to retire from acting.

=== Voice ===
- Ben Schwartz as Sonic the Hedgehog, an anthropomorphic hedgehog who has supersonic speeds, and is the leader of Team Sonic
- Keanu Reeves as Shadow the Hedgehog, an anthropomorphic hedgehog who was part of a secret government program called Project Shadow. He has lived through tragedy and seeks revenge. Fowler said once they first met, he realized Reeves "very clearly had gone and done his homework", and that he desired to create a "fan-faithful" rendition of the character.
- Colleen O'Shaughnessey as Miles "Tails" Prower, an intelligent anthropomorphic yellow fox who can fly with his twin-tails and creates gadgets that can alter appearances and disable security
- Idris Elba as Knuckles the Echidna, a hot-headed and arrogant anthropomorphic red echidna warrior with super strength and the Flames of Disaster, a technique which allows his fists to burst into flames

=== Live-action ===
- Jim Carrey in a dual role as:
  - Dr. Ivo Robotnik, a mad scientist and Sonic's arch-nemesis whom he often refers to as "Eggman"
  - Prof. Gerald Robotnik, Ivo and Maria's grandfather and the head of Project Shadow. Carrey said an intrinsic difference between Gerald and Ivo was that Gerald was from an older, tougher generation, describing him as tough as "the rock that he crawled out from under".
- James Marsden as Tom Wachowski, the adoptive father of Sonic, Tails, and Knuckles, and the sheriff of Green Hills, Montana
- Tika Sumpter as Maddie Wachowski, Tom's wife, the adoptive mother of Sonic, Tails, and Knuckles, and the local veterinarian of Green Hills
- Lee Majdoub as Agent Stone, Ivo's assistant
- Krysten Ritter as Director Rockwell, a high-ranking officer of the military organization G.U.N.
- Natasha Rothwell as Rachel, Maddie's sister whom Maddie disguises as to infiltrate G.U.N. headquarters
- Shemar Moore as Randall Handel, a G.U.N. agent and Rachel's husband, whom Tom disguises as to infiltrate G.U.N. headquarters
- Adam Pally as Wade Whipple, the deputy sheriff of Green Hills who guards the Master Emerald for Knuckles
- Alyla Browne as Maria Robotnik, Gerald's granddaughter and Ivo's cousin, who becomes a close friend to Shadow during his time in Gerald's lab
- Tom Butler as Commander Walters, the former vice chairman of the Joint Chiefs of Staff who is the leader of G.U.N.
  - James Wolk portrays a young Captain Walters, in the past in 1974.
- Jorma Taccone as Kyle Lancebottom, a G.U.N. agent on Prison Island who watches over Shadow; Taccone previously directed the Knuckles episode "The Flames of Disaster".

Cristo Fernández played the roles of brothers Pablo and Juan in the in-universe telenovela La Última Pasión, alongside Sofia Pernas, who plays Gabriella, who is caught in a love triangle with the brothers.

== Production ==
=== Development ===
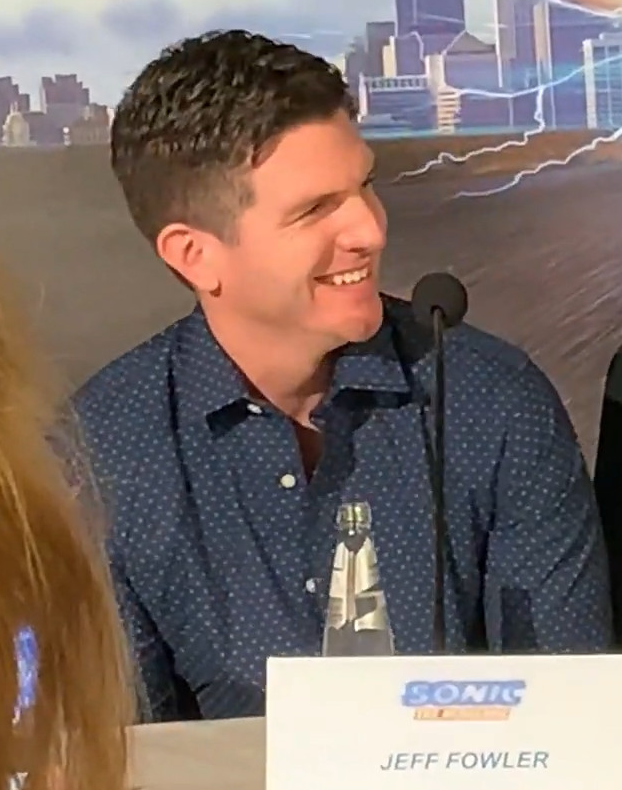
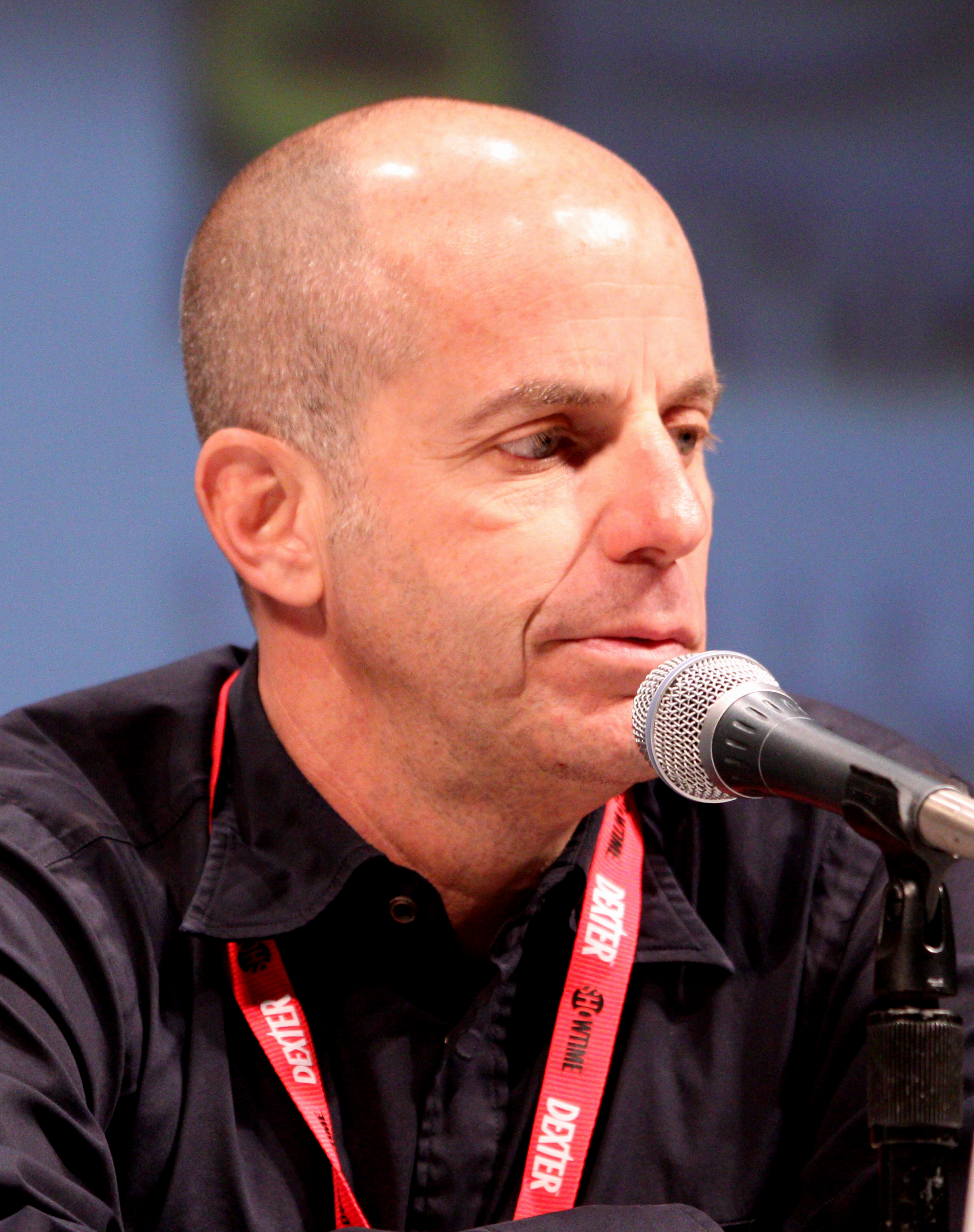
Jeff Fowler and Neal H. Moritz returned to Sonic the Hedgehog 3 as director and producer respectively.

In March 2020, James Marsden confirmed that he had signed on for multiple sequels to Sonic the Hedgehog (2020). In February 2022, Sega Sammy Group and Paramount Pictures had been developing a third film after Sonic the Hedgehog 2 (2022). It was formally announced during ViacomCBS's investor event. Produced by Original Film, Marza Animation Planet, and Blur Studio in association with Sega Sammy Group, Jeff Fowler returned as director while Neal H. Moritz, Toby Ascher, Toru Nakahara, and Hitoshi Okuno returned as producers. Haruki Satomi, Shuji Utsumi, Yukio Sugino, Fowler, Tommy Gormley, and Tim Miller served as executive producers. The film was made on a budget of $122 million. Pat Casey, Josh Miller, and John Whittington returned to write the screenplay, with the former two also being credited for the story. Paul Greenberg and Oren Uziel received off-screen additional literary material credit. In addition, a spin-off television series for Paramount+, Knuckles, was developed simultaneously with the film.

=== Casting ===
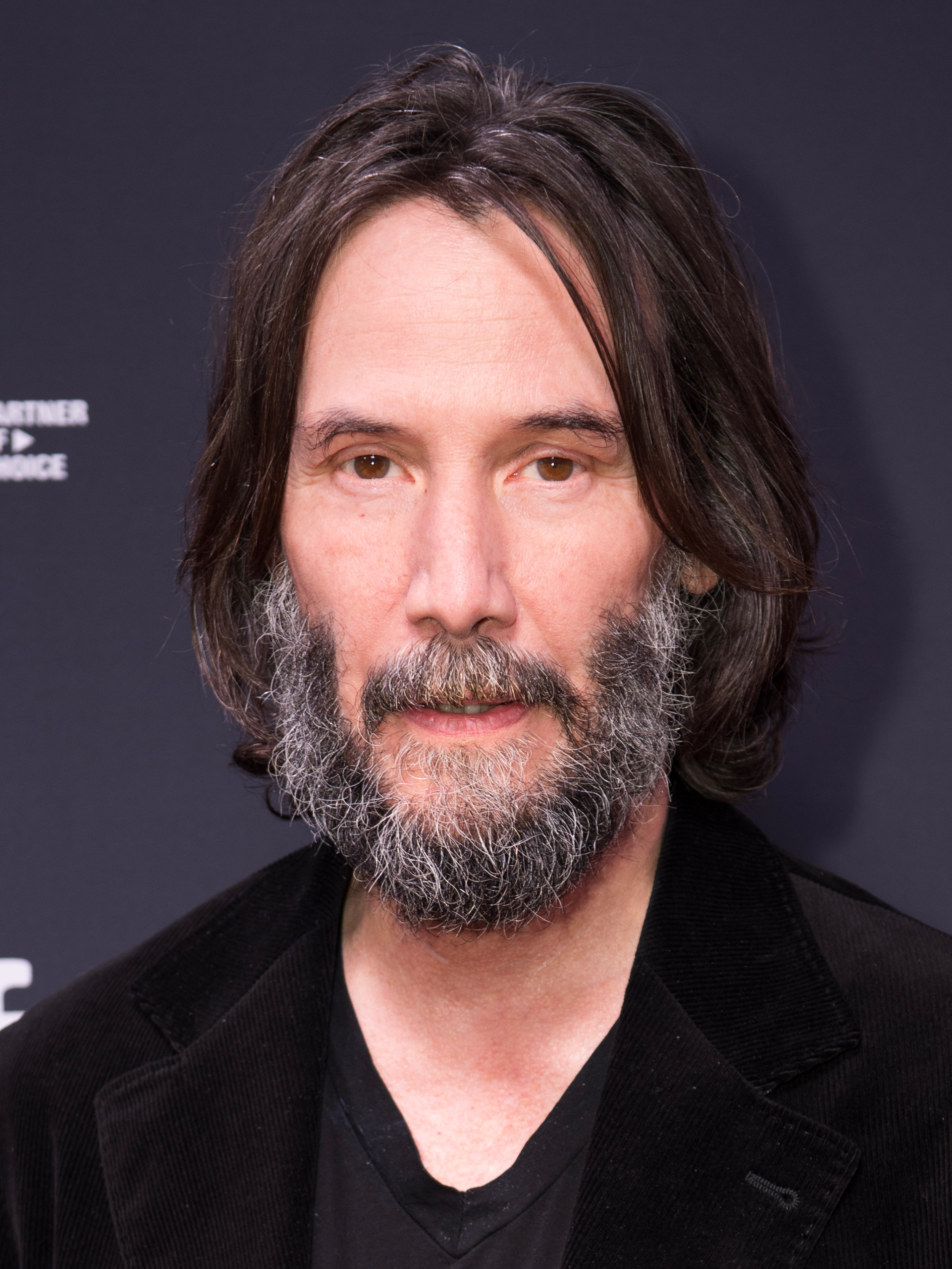
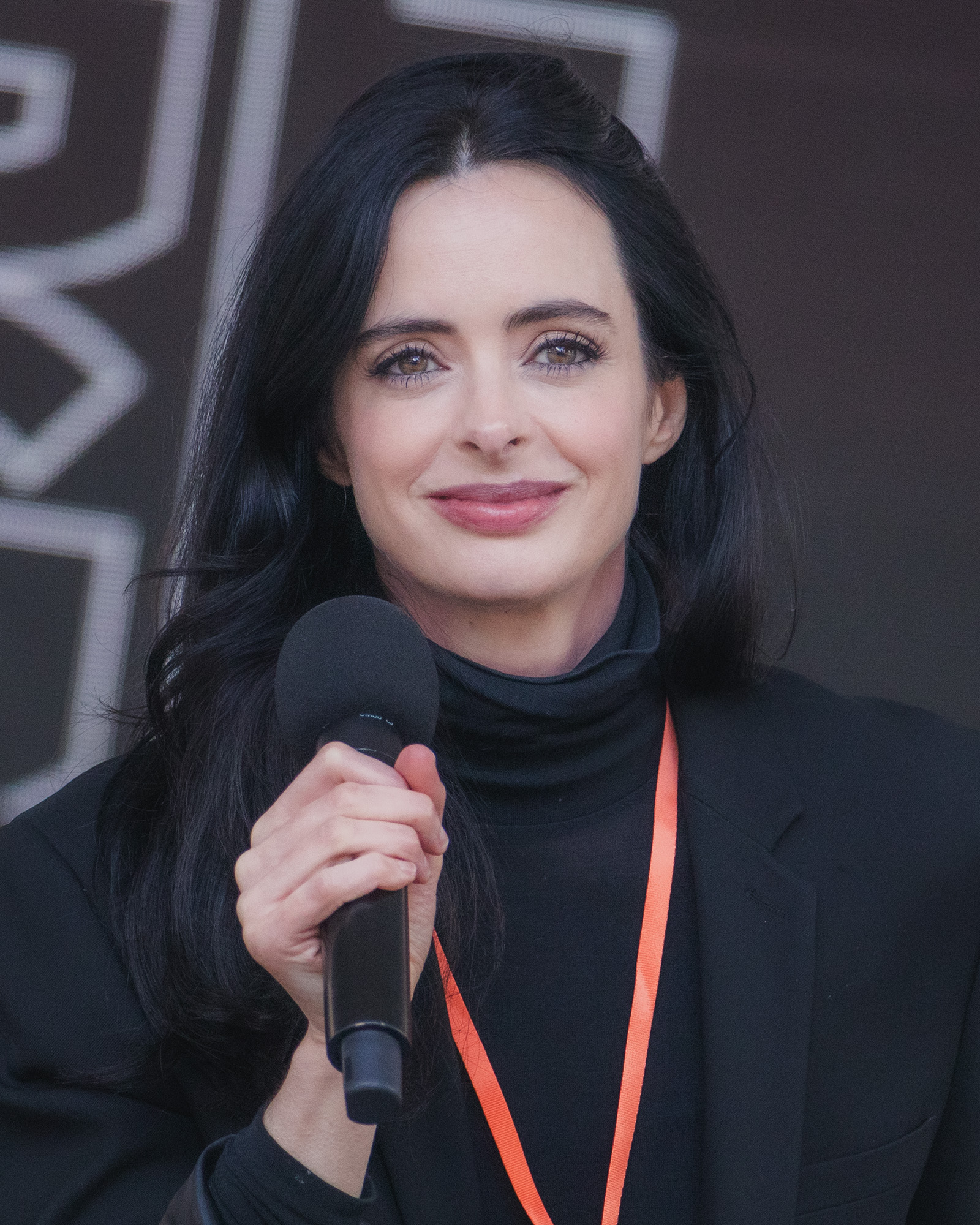
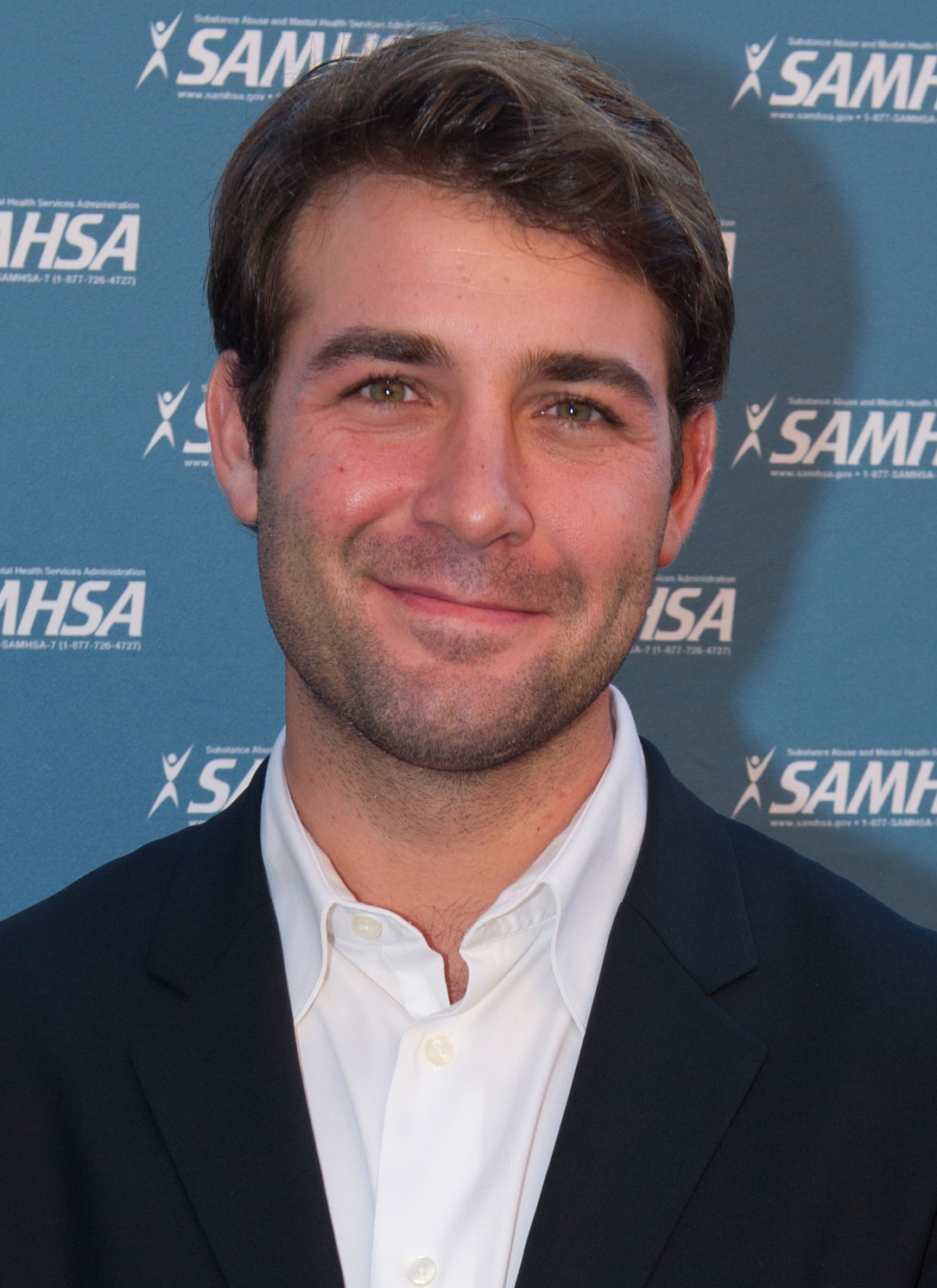
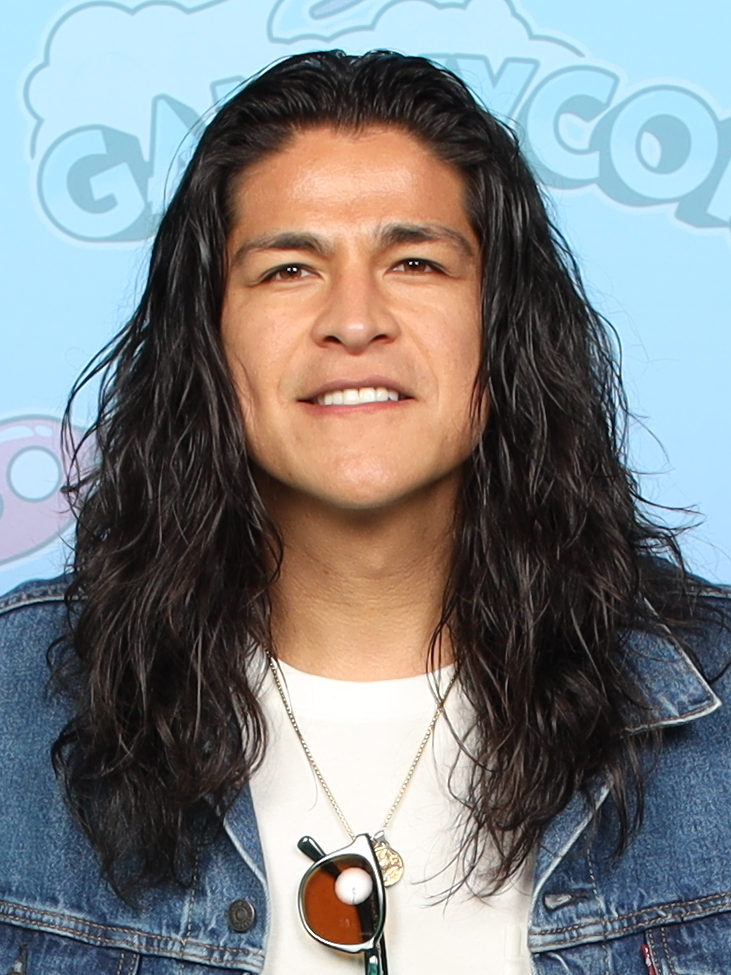
Keanu Reeves joined the film as the voice of Shadow, while Krysten Ritter, James Wolk, and Cristo Fernández joined as Director Rockwell, a young Commander Walters, and the brothers Juan and Pablo respectively.

In April 2022, Jim Carrey—who portrays Dr. Ivo Robotnik in the films—announced that he was considering retiring from acting. With his possible retirement, Moritz and Ascher confirmed that his role as Robotnik would not be recast in any sequels if he followed through with his retirement plans. However, they remained hopeful that they could develop scripts good enough for him to continue the role. Carrey conceded, requiring that "the angels bring some sort of script that's written in gold ink that says to me that it's going to be really important for people to see" if he were to continue. In February 2024, Carrey was confirmed to be reprising his role. Elaborating on his decision to sign on, he stated that "I came back to this universe because, first of all, I get to play a genius, which is a bit of a stretch. And, you know, it's just... I bought a lot of stuff and I need the money, frankly". Fowler made note of Carrey's comments about a script of gold, printing it out in 24-carat ink, which Fowler estimates would be worth about $100,000.

On April 15, 2024, it was reported that Keanu Reeves had joined the cast as the voice of Shadow. Reeves had previously been a popular fancast for the role. Fowler said there was an "obvious corollary" between Reeves's performance in the John Wick series and the "vibe we're trying to channel" for Shadow, and thus these films served as a "perfect, albeit unconventional, 'audition'" for the character. Fowler attested that even if John Wick had never been made, he believed Reeves's established history with dark and edgy characters would have led to them casting him anyway. Miller noted internet chatter about Reeves as Shadow, and felt "everyone knew they were going to try to get Keanu". Miller said that Reeves had been the voice they imagined for Shadow during the writing process, and they brought him up early on when discussing casting with Fowler and Ascher; they said that this process contrasted with their writing for Knuckles in the prior film, as Elba was not a popular fancast for the character and their conception of the voice was more generic.

Additionally, Marsden, Ben Schwartz, Tika Sumpter, Colleen O'Shaughnessey, Idris Elba, Lee Majdoub, and Tom Butler were confirmed to reprise their roles from the previous films. Krysten Ritter, Alyla Browne, James Wolk, Sofia Pernas, Cristo Fernández, and Jorma Taccone were cast in February 2024 in undisclosed roles; Taccone was previously hired as an episode director for the Knuckles series. On February 16, Browne's role was revealed as Maria. Browne had previously been in George Miller's Three Thousand Years of Longing (2022) and Furiosa: A Mad Max Saga (2024) films, and Fowler said the team "inherited his great casting" of the actress. Ritter portrays Director Rockwell, Wolk portrays a young Captain Walters, while Taccone plays Kyle Lancebottom, a G.U.N. agent on Prison Island who watches over Shadow. Sofia Pernas and Cristo Fernández respectively play Gabriella, and the twin brothers Juan and Pablo in La Última Pasión, a telenovela Ivo and Shadow watch.

=== Writing ===
Sonic the Hedgehog 3 draws inspiration from the video games Sonic Adventure 2 (2001) and Shadow the Hedgehog (2005). Miller said that adapting Sonic Adventure 2 meant that a main question was "how dark can it get" while remaining PG-rated, and Casey said that a main challenge was how to tie Shadow's backstory together with Sonic's story, which he said was achieved by looking at the thematic parallels of the significance of family between the two. Casey viewed Sonic and Shadow as mirrors, and in thinking about how to "find some satisfying stuff for Sonic" such that the film did not become "Shadow the Hedgehog, Guest Starring Sonic" and to establish drama, they thought about what events could "drive Sonic over the edge in a similar fashion" as Shadow. Among the elements from Sonic Adventure 2 incorporated were the fairy-like creatures the Chao. In the film, they are part of a Chao Gardens-themed restaurant in Tokyo, the city where Team Sonic and Shadow face off for the first time. Fowler felt using the characters in a popular attraction was believable, and could be used as a plot device, such as when Team Sonic needed to have a moment to regroup and have a conversation about what was going on. On introducing Amy Rose in the post-credits scene, Casey and Miller said their final draft of the script had been similar in form, but originally "dipped more into what a story for a fourth film might be", but it was decided that Amy's introduction would be a tease instead of establishing a story.

Miller said that one main challenge of adapting the story elements of Sonic Adventure 2 was balancing the darkness with the mandate to keep the film family-friendly, and that another was to adapt the story elements for the timeframe and narrative of the film series; Casey said that two obvious examples were that the concept of Gerald, Maria, and Shadow living in the ARK space station as they did in the games would be incompatible with the setting of the 1970s, and discarding Maria's terminal illness from the games as for this story it was not needed. To write the dual roles of Gerald and Ivo for Carrey, Fowler said they initially focused on parallels between his two characters, not just with their physical appearances but in characterization as well; they then decided they needed to "create the right sort of conflict" for the film. Miller saw this film as central to Ivo, whose character transformation was more extensive than Sonic's. Casey said Carrey embraced the story of Gerald's "toxicity" affecting Ivo, who "regresses into a little kid", and said that the "hurt" the film reveals Ivo experienced gave the story more emotion. Miller described their role in writing the script for Carrey as building "an arena for him to kind of go bonkers and come up with all these ideas", and that much of the characters' humor was conceived by the actor himself, and Casey described his and Miller's writing as a "framework" for Carrey.

Casey said he and Miller had considered writing in the line "guns, lots of guns" for Shadow to say in an homage to voice actor Reeves having two characters, Neo from The Matrix and John Wick, who said the line before—though they decided against it, instead ending up with the film referencing the Reeves film Speed (1994) and the choreography of Sonic and Shadow's final duel mimicking that of Neo and Agent Smith's fight at the end of The Matrix. Fowler felt that the world did not become "edgy" with Shadow's character, but said the tone the character brought made the films more exciting and dangerous. He acknowledged the elements of firearms and Shadow's motorcycle in his eponymous 2005 video game, and said that they were "very respectful" about fan expectations for the adaptation, and that he and his team were cognizant of how to properly incorporate that imagery into a family film. Fowler explained that the inclusion of a reference to the TikTok meme "Shadow loves Latinas" in the film was a way to "honor what fans know and love" about the franchise's history of being the subject of online shitposting. Initially being unaware of the meme and its popularity, Juan / Pablo actor Cristo Fernández mused the appreciation of it was tied to the appeal of telenovelas, the medium with which the meme was implemented in the film—Shadow watches the in-universe telenovela La Última Pasión, and takes a liking to the character Gabriella.

=== Filming and voice recording ===
Principal photography was originally scheduled to begin on August 31, 2023, in London, England, but was delayed to September. Production with physical actors started on November 29, 2023, and was announced with a teaser image of Shadow the Hedgehog's stand-in statue used in filming. Brandon Trost returned from Sonic 2 as cinematographer, and Luke Freeborn was production designer. Schwartz began recording for the film by mid-February 2024. Marsden said that filming had been completed by March 14, while Fowler officially revealed that the film had wrapped production on March 29.

Fowler said that asking Carrey to play the dual role of Ivo's grandfather Gerald was "such a big ask", and meant Carrey had to spend three hours in a makeup chair being physically prepared to play Gerald each time. Carrey also helped design the prosthetics he wore. While Carrey performed each role, actor Brendan Murphy doubled for the other character. During each performance, Carrey informed Murphy how he would be doing the other, a system the former said was "very technically difficult", especially considering that he was interacting with a pre-recorded voice track of the opposite character during his performances. Trost said that Murphy "had to understand [Carrey]'s performance inside and out" in order to convincingly perform. Fernández said that he had not had the opportunity to meet Carrey—a childhood hero of his—nor Reeves during production, as his portion of the film was shot separately from all the other actors. Trost credited his experience directing his film An American Pickle, in which Seth Rogen performed a dual role, with informing how he approached planning the shoots for Carrey's dual role. Due to the complexity of the makeup needed for his role as Gerald, shooting Carrey performing as both of his characters on the same day was not feasible. As such, Trost said that the production crew spent a significant amount of time ensuring that the shooting conditions were in the same state as they had been before when Carrey's second part of the scene was shot. The crew took detailed notes and panorama photographs documenting the set and the shooting setup in order to ensure consistency.

Director Jeff Fowler worked as an animator on the Shadow the Hedgehog video game, and included homages to the game's cutscenes within Sonic the Hedgehog 3.

Fowler said that Reeves "would just give us so many different versions of line readings and just want to keep going" during voice recording and said he put more into his performance than "just sort of showing up and reading the script into a microphone", both understanding their vision for the film and realizing his interpretation of Shadow; Reeves was prepared with questions to give himself insight about what the team was trying to achieve. Animation supervisor Clem Yip said Reeves's low-key, serious vocal performance informed their visual work. As opposed to acting with a placeholder tennis ball in scenes with Shadow, Browne shot scenes with a Shadow puppet, with his puppeteers ad-libbing certain lines into the film. Fowler explained that "it really takes skill and imagination to create a believable performance" with there not being "really anything" to act with in scenes—something the other performers had to accomplish—and remarked that he was impressed with Browne's mastery of this at her young age. In creating the action sequences involving Shadow, Fowler paid homage to the 2005 Shadow the Hedgehog game by adapting several of its action scenes in the film. Fowler previously worked as an animator on the 2005 game, and felt honored to adapt the character for the screen.

=== Post-production and VFX ===
As a cost-cutting measure, the producers had an in-house animation team at Paramount work on both Sonic the Hedgehog 3 and the Knuckles series. Clem Yip served as animation supervisor, while Al LeVine served as film editor. Animation was produced by six studios: Rising Sun Pictures, Rodeo FX, Industrial Light & Magic, Fin, Marza Animation Planet and the in-house team at Paramount. Fowler's team took a "speedboat vendor" strategy, dividing the animation work across these six studios. Fowler emphasized the need for visual continuity between the projects and cited communication as critical to this mandate. Trost said that much of filming was set up to accommodate lighting, framing, camera movements, and other processes completed during VFX production. He said that the filming crew accepted that their work constituted around 30% of the content in a final frame, and that the VFX crews trusted them to deliver a "strong foundation" to work on.

According to Ascher, the in-house team "made an investment in the Sonic assets", built them themselves then distributed them to the vendors, which he noted was comparatively different from previous installments where "usually the vendor controls the assets that they rig". Owning the assets also allowed for their in-house team to work exclusively on Sonic the Hedgehog 3 and Knuckles, and helped the production "keep costs down and move faster". Fowler said that the multi-studio process meant there were more parties "you have to bring up to speed, so initially there's an extra level of work that has to be done". He said that once this was achieved, the flexibility allowed his team to tweak the finer aspects of the production and the performances.

== Music ==
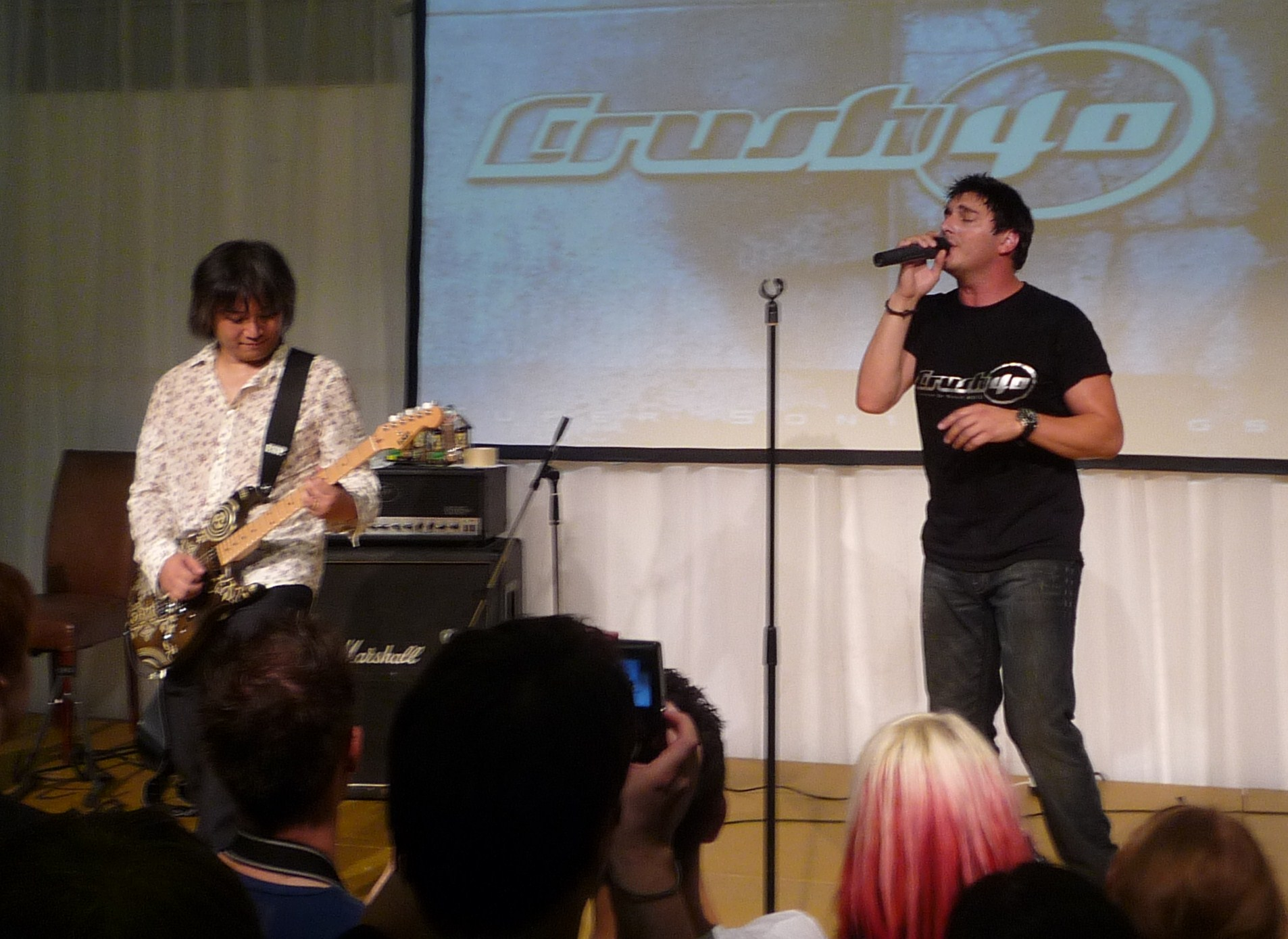
The song "Live & Learn" from Sonic Adventure 2, performed by the band Crush 40 (pictured), was featured as a leitmotif in Sonic the Hedgehog 3.

Tom Holkenborg, who composed the score for the first two Sonic films, returned to score Sonic the Hedgehog 3 and had finished work by July 2024. In December 2023 Johnny Gioeli, the vocalist for the band Crush 40, said there had been talks of including "Live & Learn", the theme song from Sonic Adventure 2, in Sonic the Hedgehog 3. In February 2024, Gioeli confirmed "Live & Learn" would be included in the film. It is introduced in the opening scene of Sonic the Hedgehog 3 as a riff that Maria Robotnik plays on her guitar, from then on functioning as a leitmotif for Shadow. The vocal version, remixed by the film's composer, appears during Sonic and Shadow's duel and when they transform into Super Sonic and Super Shadow to stop the Eclipse Cannon from destroying the Earth. Fowler explained his affinity for the "awesome" song made its use inevitable in the film, and joked that fans would have hunted him down if he failed to use it, which he did "strong[ly]". The singer Jelly Roll released a single for the film, "Run It", on November 21, 2024. Sonic the Hedgehog 3 also features the song "Neon" from Japanese rock band One Ok Rock, who previously contributed to the soundtrack for the 2022 game Sonic Frontiers. The soundtrack album was released by Milan Records on December 20, 2024.

== Release ==
=== Theatrical ===
Sonic the Hedgehog 3 premiered at the Empire Leicester Square in London on December 10, 2024, and at the TCL Chinese Theatre in Los Angeles, California, on December 16. It was released in the United States by Paramount Pictures on December 20, taking over the original release date of Smurfs (2025). It screened in 4DX and other premium formats, though forewent an IMAX release. Paramount held a fan event on December 19 for early screenings at theaters in premium formats.

=== Marketing ===
In April 2024 at CinemaCon, Paramount showcased first-look footage of the film, which featured a heavier Robotnik bemoaning his current state before Agent Stone informs him that "they found him", and Sonic, Tails, and Knuckles fighting a silent Shadow. In July, a popcorn bucket and action figures produced by Jakks Pacific were leaked online. On August 25, the first official tease of Keanu Reeves's involvement as Shadow was posted to the film's TikTok account, which referenced the actor's mention in the first film, captioned "foreSHADOWing". Beginning at that time, images of the film's characters were projected on buildings in locations globally in promotion of the film's first trailer, which released on August 27 alongside a teaser poster. Several critics considered Reeves's role the most prominent feature in the trailer. IGN observed that "Keanu Reeves is very much in Keanu Reeves mode here", and Vulture likened the actor's moody and vengeful portrayal of Shadow to a John Wick performance. Ash Parrish of The Verge agreed that Reeves's voice was satisfactory, and also noted Maria's reveal, anticipating how the film would adapt her fate.

On the opening weekend of Paramount's Transformers One, posters of Shadow were raffled to the first 300 attendees at select theaters, with Reeves signing a limited quantity of them. In commemoration of Halloween, a 10-second clip from the film of Shadow saying "boo" was posted on social media. On November 4, a promotional still image of Shadow was released by Fandango. On November 18, a new poster was released, featuring the main team, the Robotniks, and Shadow, who looms above the cast at the top and also rides his Dark Rider motorcycle at the bottom. Several press outlets were also sent a Sega Genesis cartridge containing promotional posters and voice lines from the characters, as well as a minigame through which the date for the film's second trailer could be unlocked by inputting a cheat code from the game Sonic the Hedgehog 3 (1994); ↑ ↑ ↓ ↓ ↑ ↑ ↑ ↑. The trailer was released on November 25. Commentary focused on Shadow's use of a gun in one scene, considering the prominence of firearms in the 2005 Shadow the Hedgehog game and Sega's subsequent disownment, as well as Tails being mistaken for the Pokémon character Pikachu. The phrases "HE HAS A GUN" and "HE PISSED ON THE MOON" began trending on social media following the trailer's release, with the latter being a reference to the popular web series SnapCube's Real-Time Fandub.

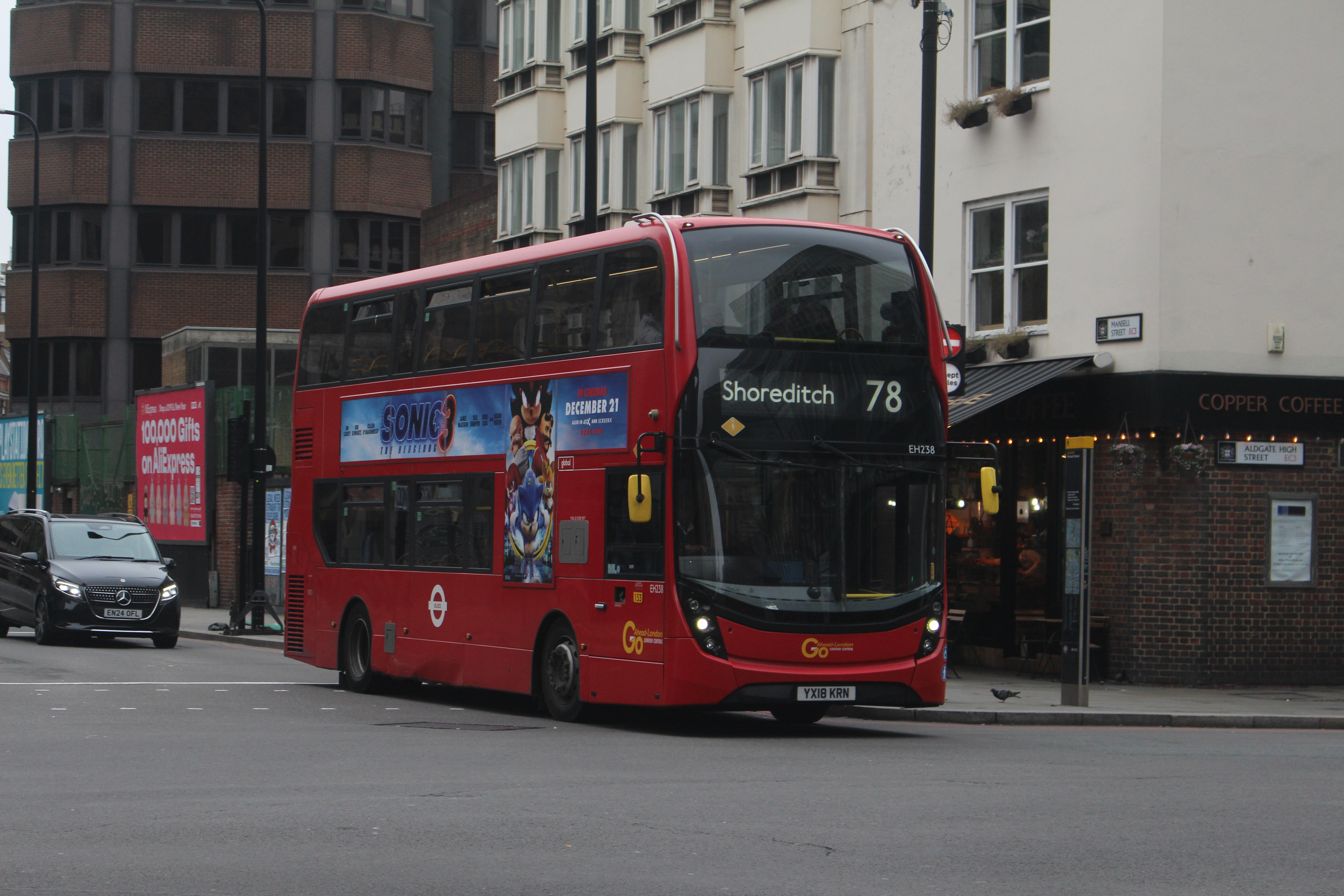
Poster advertising for Sonic the Hedgehog 3 on the side of a Go-Ahead London bus

By October, the Jakks Pacific toy merchandise was released. The shoe company Reebok produced a tie-in line of sneakers in promotion for the film, and McDonald's sold Happy Meal toys of the film's characters. AMC Theaters produced a novelty popcorn bucket of Sonic's head and a collectible combo of a cup, drink topper, and a mask. On December 11, 2024, Paramount also released several posters parodying numerous Christmas films. The original "Ugly Sonic" design from the first film that received backlash was featured as a sweater design that would be given away as a prize. A stop-motion short, "A Very Sonic Christmas", was released on December 11, 2024, with Schwartz, Elba, O'Shaughnessey, and Reeves reprising their roles, and Wade Whipple actor Adam Pally voicing Santa Claus. A tie-in video game, Shadow Generations, was released in October 2024. The Sonic Team head, Takashi Iizuka, said he wanted to "spotlight Shadow as a character". Downloadable content based on the film was released on December 12, with an additional level set in Tokyo as it appears in the film; during the level, Shadow's appearance changes to resemble his movie counterpart, with Reeves reprising his voice. Reeves and Fowler gave an interview on CBS Mornings to promote the film.

=== Home media ===
Sonic the Hedgehog 3 was released for digital download on January 21, 2025, and released on Ultra HD Blu-ray, Blu-ray, and DVD on April 15. 4K SteelBook options include an edition with Sonic on the cover, and an Amazon retailer-exclusive version with Shadow on a red lightning bolt pattern background. Special features content include audio commentary with Fowler and Schwartz, a feature with Reeves and the cast discussing Shadow, a segment in the recording booth with Schwartz, Elba, and O'Shaughnessy, and the "A Very Sonic Christmas" special. The film began streaming on Paramount+ in the United States and Canada on February 18, 2025. Upon the film's digital release in the UK, it debuted atop the Official Charts Company's Official Film Chart.

== Reception ==
=== Box office ===
Sonic the Hedgehog 3 grossed $236.1 million in the United States and Canada, and $256 million in other territories, for a worldwide total of $492.2 million. It became the tenth highest-grossing film of 2024 in the US and Canada, and the tenth-highest-grossing film of 2024 worldwide. Deadline Hollywood calculated the film's net profit as $123.6 million. Accounting for production budgets, marketing, and other costs against the film's box office grosses, merchandise, television and streaming, and home media revenues, the site ranked Sonic 3 tenth on their list of 2024's "Most Valuable Blockbusters".

In the United States and Canada, Sonic the Hedgehog 3 was released alongside Mufasa: The Lion King and was projected to gross $55–60 million from 3,800 theaters. The film made $6.5 million from Thursday night previews, setting a record for the Sonic franchise. On Friday, the film grossed $25.7 million, a slight decrease from Sonic the Hedgehog 2, which made $26.3 million. The film went on to gross $60.1 million during the three-day opening weekend, topping the box office and achieving the second-highest weekend debut for a PG film in December behind 2005's The Chronicles of Narnia: The Lion, the Witch and the Wardrobe ($65.6 million). In its second weekend, Sonic the Hedgehog 3 retained the top spot at the box office with $37 million. At this point, the film's $136 million US and Canada box office total brought Reeves's lifetime box office earnings in that region over the $3 billion threshold.

The film finished in second place behind Mufasa: The Lion King in its third weekend with $21.4 million. The film finished in third place behind Mufasa: The Lion King and Den of Thieves 2: Pantera in its fourth weekend with $11.3 million. By its fifth weekend, the film surpassed the gross of its predecessor with $420 million, becoming the highest-grossing film in the franchise. In its sixth weekend, it grossed $10.6 million. In its seventh, it reached a worldwide total of $462.5 million, making it the second-highest-grossing video game film of all time, ahead of Pokémon Detective Pikachu (2019) and behind The Super Mario Bros. Movie (2023), a record it held until it was surpassed by A Minecraft Movie in April 2025. By March 4, the film grossed $485.7 million, overtaking Bruce Almighty (2003) as Carrey's highest-grossing film.

=== Critical response ===
Sonic the Hedgehog 3 received a positive critical response. On the review aggregator website Rotten Tomatoes, 85% of 151 critics' reviews are positive. The website's consensus reads: "With a double helping of Jim Carrey's antics and a quicksilver pace befitting its hero, Sonic the Hedgehog 3 is the best entry in this amiable series yet." By January 2025, it was tied with Werewolves Within (2021) for being the highest-rated film based on a video game on the website, with an 86% score; in September 2026, it was surpassed by Zach Cregger's Resident Evil, with a 96% score. Metacritic, which uses a weighted average, assigned the film a score of 56 out of 100, based on 28 critics, indicating "mixed or average" reviews. Audiences polled by CinemaScore gave the film an average grade of "A" on an A+ to F scale, matching the previous two films' grades, while those polled by PostTrak gave it an 89% positive score.

Reeves's and Carrey's performances received praise. Variety's Owen Gleiberman said that Reeves's "tones of deepest resonance" made Shadow empathetic, and that Carrey topped his previous work with his roles as the Robotniks. Screen Rant's Rachel Labonte named Reeves's Shadow the standout, saying Reeves was brilliant at conveying the "hurt and steel". ComicBook.com's Marc Deschamps wrote that Reeves perfectly portrayed Shadow, and that his brooding and darkness mixed well with the film's humor. He said while Gerald and Ivo largely served as comic relief, their relationship also contextualized Ivo and Agent Stone's characters, and that the film made a great ending for Robotnik. The New York Times's Glenn Kenny felt Reeves brought "suitable emo brooding" to Shadow, and that Carrey's "virtuoso double act" was "bombastic". IGN's Matt Donato said that Reeves's identity—already reflected by his voice—profoundly paralleled the tragedy in Shadow's story considering Reeves had experienced "unthinkable" hardships in his life; Donato concluded that Reeves "is Shadow the Hedgehog".

The A.V. Club's Matt Donato wrote Reeves added "stoic somberness" to the established cast and noted Carrey's doubling up of the "looniness". The Hollywood Reporter said that Reeves brought the same gravitas to Shadow that he did to John Wick, feeling his delivery of "quiet condescension" made him "all the scarier for the lack of overt menace". It praised Carrey's jokes, but questioned the returning human characters. Polygon's Jesse Hassenger said Carrey's "gloriously deranged one-man, two-character musical" contrasted with the "utter sincerity" of Reeves, who made Shadow a "weirdly likable little ball of pain". In contrast, The Guardian's Andrew Pulver was ambivalent or critical about most of the performances and said the film would have been "a lot, lot worse" without Carrey, while Deadline Hollywood's Pete Hammond felt Carrey's fourth-wall breaking was not as impactful given Ryan Reynolds's success with Deadpool. The Observer's Wendy Ide wrote "two Jim Carreys, each of them turning every individual line of dialogue into an extravagant pantomime of gurning and grandstanding, is categorically one too many".

Fowler's direction and the CGI were the subject of critical commentary. Donato said that the direction made the plot "digestible", Hammond felt Fowler's grandeur was excessive, though admitted that audiences would not find this a problem, and Labonte said Fowler succeeded in expressing Shadow's story in an emotional and engaging way. Donato said that the animation was executed successfully and uniformly such that one could not tell there were six separate studios working in parallel. Kenny felt the "teeming computer graphics gadgetry of death and destruction" was "bombastic". A. A. Dowd of IGN said the CGI was "much more pleasing" than in previous Sonic films. IndieWire's Christian Zilko criticized the CGI, feeling the characters never fit in a given scene, and said Fowler's work was mediocre.

=== Accolades ===
Accolades received by Sonic the Hedgehog 3 (film)
Award	Date of Ceremony	Category	Recipient(s)	Result	Ref.
Nickelodeon Kids' Choice Awards	June 21, 2025	Favorite Movie	Sonic the Hedgehog 3	Nominated	
Nickelodeon Kids' Choice Awards	June 21, 2025	Favorite Movie Actor	Jim Carrey	Nominated	
Nickelodeon Kids' Choice Awards	June 21, 2025	Favorite Male Voice from an Animated Movie	Ben Schwartz	Nominated	
Nickelodeon Kids' Choice Awards	June 21, 2025	Favorite Male Voice from an Animated Movie	Keanu Reeves	Nominated	
Nickelodeon Kids' Choice Awards	June 21, 2025	Favorite Villain	Jim Carrey	Won	
Nickelodeon Kids' Choice Awards	June 21, 2025	Favorite Song from a Movie	"Run It" – Jelly Roll	Nominated	
Golden Joystick Awards	November 20, 2025	Best Game Adaptation	Sonic the Hedgehog 3	Nominated	

== Sequel ==
In September 2024, producer Toby Ascher stated intent for additional Sonic films. Elba and Reeves have expressed interest in a spin-off starring their characters. In December 2024, a fourth Sonic film entered development, set for release on March 19, 2027. Despite his character's presumed death in Sonic the Hedgehog 3, Carrey said in January 2025 that he was "open to the idea" of returning for the fourth film, provided that its premise interested him. On February 18, 2026, it was announced that Kristen Bell had joined the cast of the sequel as the voice of Amy Rose.

== See also ==
- List of films based on video games
