= Knuckles (TV series) =

2024 American television miniseries

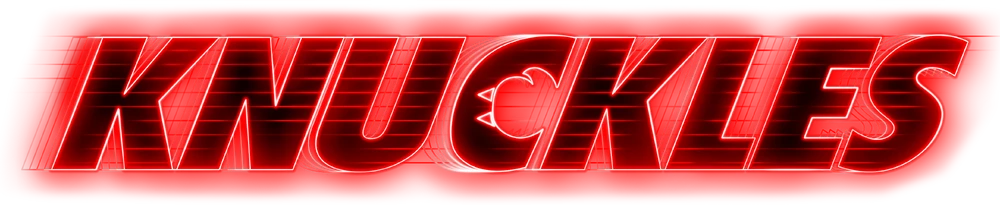
- Genre: Action-adventure; Comedy
- Created by: John Whittington; Toby Ascher
- Based on: Sonic the Hedgehog by Sega (Note: Sonic the Hedgehog was developed by Sonic Team, published by Sega, directed and programmed by Yuji Naka, designed by Hirokazu Yasuhara, and illustrated by Naoto Ohshima.)
- Showrunner: Toby Ascher
- Starring: Idris Elba; Adam Pally
- Music by: Tom Howe
- Opening theme: "The Warrior" by Scandal
- Country of origin: United States
- Original language: English
- No. of episodes: 6

Production
- Executive producers: Neal H. Moritz; Toby Ascher; Jeff Fowler; John Whittington; Idris Elba; Haruki Satomi; Shuji Utsumi; Toru Nakahara
- Producers: Samantha Waite; Hitoshi Okuno
- Cinematography: Brandon Trost; Peter Wilike
- Editors: Al LeVine; Liyana Mansor; Richard Ketteridge
- Running time: 23–33 minutes
- Production companies: Paramount Pictures; Sega Sammy Group; Original Film

Original release
- Network: Paramount+
- Release: April 26, 2024

Related
- Sonic the Hedgehog film series

Knuckles (Note: Japanese: ナックルズ, Hepburn: Nakkuruzu) is an American television miniseries created by John Whittington and Toby Ascher for the streaming service Paramount+, based on characters from Sega's Sonic the Hedgehog video game series. It is a spin-off of the Sonic the Hedgehog film series and the first live-action Sonic television series. The series takes place between the events of the films Sonic the Hedgehog 2 (2022) and Sonic the Hedgehog 3 (2024), and follows Knuckles the Echidna as he trains deputy sheriff Wade Whipple in the ways of the Echidna warrior. Whittington was head writer, with Ascher as showrunner.

Idris Elba reprised his voice role as Knuckles from the film series and stars alongside Adam Pally, reprising his role as Wade. The series was announced in February 2022 during a ViacomCBS investor event, with Elba on board with the project. Production began in London, England, in April 2023, with Sonic film director Jeff Fowler directing the pilot and further casting announced. Ged Wright, Brandon Trost, Jorma Taccone, and Carol Banker directed the following episodes. Tom Howe composed the score.

Knuckles premiered on April 26, 2024, with all six episodes. Over its premiere weekend, it became the most-watched original series on Paramount+. It received generally positive reviews from critics, with praise directed towards the action sequences and Elba and Pally's performances, although some criticized the writing and felt that the show lacked focus on Knuckles.

== Cast and characters ==
=== Main ===
- Idris Elba as the voice of Knuckles the Echidna, a hot-headed and serious anthropomorphic red echidna with super strength. Elba said the series would explore Knuckles being "a fish out of water" after moving to Earth at the end of Sonic the Hedgehog 2 (2022), and further delve into his character. Elba ad-libbed part of his dialogue during recording.
- Adam Pally as Wade Whipple, a dimwitted deputy sheriff of Green Hills who Knuckles trains in the ways of an Echidna warrior.
  - Kit Rakusen portrays a young version of Wade, while Michael Bolton provides Wade's singing voice.

=== Recurring ===
- Ellie Taylor as Willoughby, a former extraterrestrial researcher and corrupt G.U.N. agent working for the Buyer.
- Scott Mescudi as Mason, a former underground fighter and corrupt G.U.N. agent working for the Buyer. Mescudi (Kid Cudi) previously performed the credits theme for Sonic the Hedgehog 2, "Stars in the Sky".
- Stockard Channing as Wendy Whipple, Wade's mother.
- Edi Patterson as Wanda Whipple, an FBI agent and Wade's immature sister who constantly mistreats him.
  - Darcy Castle portrays a young version of Wanda.
- Julian Barratt as Jack Sinclair, a bounty hunter and the captain of Wade's former bowling team.
- Christopher Lloyd as the voice of Chief Pachacamac, the deceased elder of Knuckles' tribe who returns as a ghost.
- Rory McCann as "The Buyer", a former agent of Dr. Robotnik who seeks to obtain Knuckles' power.
- Alice Tregonning as Susie Barnes, an eight-year-old girl who is Wade's bowling rival turned teammate.
- Cary Elwes as "Pistol" Pete Whipple, an eccentric 27-time championship bowler and Wade's estranged father.
- Rob Huebel as Dylan Beagleton, a bowling commentator for ESPN8 The Ocho.
- Paul Scheer as Gary N. Sinclair III Esq., also a bowling commentator for ESPN8 The Ocho.

=== Special guest stars ===
- Ben Schwartz as the voice of Sonic the Hedgehog, an anthropomorphic blue hedgehog who can run at supersonic speeds.
- Colleen O'Shaughnessey as the voice of Miles "Tails" Prower, an anthropomorphic yellow-orange fox who can fly with his two tails.
- Tika Sumpter as Maddie Wachowski, Green Hills' veterinarian who is Tom's wife and the adoptive mother of Team Sonic.

== Episodes ==
No.	Title	Directed by	Written by	Original release date	Nickelodeon air date	Prod. code	U.S. linear viewers (millions)
1	"The Warrior"	Jeff Fowler	John Whittington	April 26, 2024	August 12, 2024	101	0.16
Knuckles is struggling to adjust to home life in Green Hills due to his warrior lifestyle which even affected Maddie Wachowski's plans to have her house rebuilt after Dr. Ivo Robotnik's attack. (Note: As seen in Sonic the Hedgehog 2 (2022).) Taking Sonic's advice to make himself at home too far, a furious Maddie grounds Knuckles. After soliciting advice from his deceased Echidna elder Pachacamac, Knuckles takes up Wade Whipple, who was recently kicked from his bowling team for the upcoming tournament at Reno, Nevada, as his apprentice; Wade decides to let Knuckles accompany him to Reno for the tournament. As they begin their trip, they are tracked by corrupt G.U.N. agents Willoughby and Mason. They intend to capture and sell Knuckles to the mysterious Buyer who supplies them with weapons configured from Ivo's technology and powered by Knuckles' quills. At a roadside bowling alley, Wade confides to Knuckles that he was deserted by his father at a young age, leaving him with abandonment issues. Using a ring portal, Willoughby and Mason appear to battle Knuckles; he defeats Mason, but Willoughby takes advantage of the distraction to trap Knuckles in a cage, and they escape.
2	"Don't Ever Say I Wasn't There For You"	Ged Wright	John Whittington	April 26, 2024	August 12, 2024	102	0.15
Willoughby and Mason take Knuckles to a ski lodge to await a meeting with the Buyer. Armed with a pair of Mason's weaponized gauntlets, Wade comes up with a plan to sneak in and rescue Knuckles. Though his plan fails, with his squad car being destroyed in the process, Wade outsmarts the agents and saves Knuckles. They find a truck to use to escape, with Wade teaching Knuckles that not every victory needs to be righteous. At daybreak, they learn from the radio that Wade has been branded a fugitive, so Knuckles suggests finding a hiding place, and Wade reluctantly decides on his childhood home.
3	"The Shabbat Dinner"	Brandon Trost	Brian Schacter	April 26, 2024	August 13, 2024	103	0.20
Wade and Knuckles lay low at Wade's old home in Boise, Idaho, where they are greeted by Wade's Jewish mother, Wendy Whipple, and his older sister Wanda, who is an FBI agent. Wendy is overjoyed to see her kids home, having prepared for the family's traditional Shabbat dinner, but Wade is despondent, due to constant mistreatment and abuse from Wanda throughout his childhood. That night, tensions quickly boil between the Whipples, and Knuckles learns about the family customs from Wendy. Wade secludes himself in his room, where Knuckles learns that Wade's reason for wanting to go to the tournament is because his father, bowling champion "Pistol" Pete Whipple, will be competing. A group of bounty hunters learn of Wade's wanted status and strike at the house, but Knuckles and the Whipples manage to dispatch them, allowing the family to reconcile as they watch the Shabbat candles dim.
4	"The Flames of Disaster"	Jorma Taccone	James Madejski	April 26, 2024	August 14, 2024	104	0.11
The next morning following the Shabbat dinner, Jack Sinclair, a bounty hunter and Wade's former best bowling partner, kidnaps Wade to turn him in for the reward money. Knuckles chooses not to rescue Wade, deciding to use the experience to teach Wade independence. Unable to escape, Wade is advised by Knuckles to visit the "Great Battleground in the Sky" for guidance. Wade successfully visits the afterlife, which takes the form of a bowling alley, where Pachacamac teaches him through a low budget rock opera of Knuckles' origins. Wade comes to learn that a warrior's greatest strength is their heart, allowing him to escape and challenge Jack to a joust, which he wins. With newfound confidence in himself, Wade and Knuckles continue on to Reno, now joined by Wendy and Wanda.
5	"Reno, Baby"	Carol Banker	Brian Schacter	April 26, 2024	August 15, 2024	105	0.16
Knuckles and the Whipples arrive in Reno where Wade confronts and reconciles with Pete. With his relationship with his father seemingly resolved, Wade moves up the ranks in the bowling tournament, pitting him against Pete in the finals. Meanwhile, Willoughby and Mason are forcefully taken to the Buyer who reveals that he used to work for Robotnik and Willoughby convinces him to give them one last chance to recapture Knuckles. Witnessing him and Pete bond, Wendy warns Wade that Pete will eventually leave him again. Visiting Pete's rooftop penthouse, Wade finds Mason and Willoughby holding Wendy and Wanda hostage, revealing Pete sold them out to keep Wade out of the tournament. With his family's lives at stake, Wade is forced to lure Knuckles into the penthouse where Willoughby and Mason prepare to ambush him.
6	"What Happens in Reno, Stays in Reno"	Carol Banker	John Whittington	April 26, 2024	August 16, 2024	106	0.14
Having been secretly tipped off by Wade, Knuckles avoids the trap and fights the agents, while Wade frees his family. Knuckles defeats the agents by re-directing a pair of ring portals that suck them up, trapping them between dimensions when the portals collapse on themselves. Wade proceeds to the tournament to challenge his father in the finals, while the Buyer confronts Knuckles outside using a giant mech suit. Wade rolls a perfect game to defeat Pete, but during Wade's celebration, they are interrupted by Knuckles and the Buyer's fight. The Buyer catches Knuckles and drains him of his power, but Wade stands up to him, holding off the Buyer with the help of his mother and sister. Knuckles eventually regains consciousness and reabsorbs his power, activating the Flames of Disaster technique as he and Wade manage to defeat the Buyer. Pete attempts to flee with the trophy, but he is thwarted by Wanda and Wendy, as Wade and Knuckles celebrate before heading back to Green Hills.

== Production ==
=== Development ===
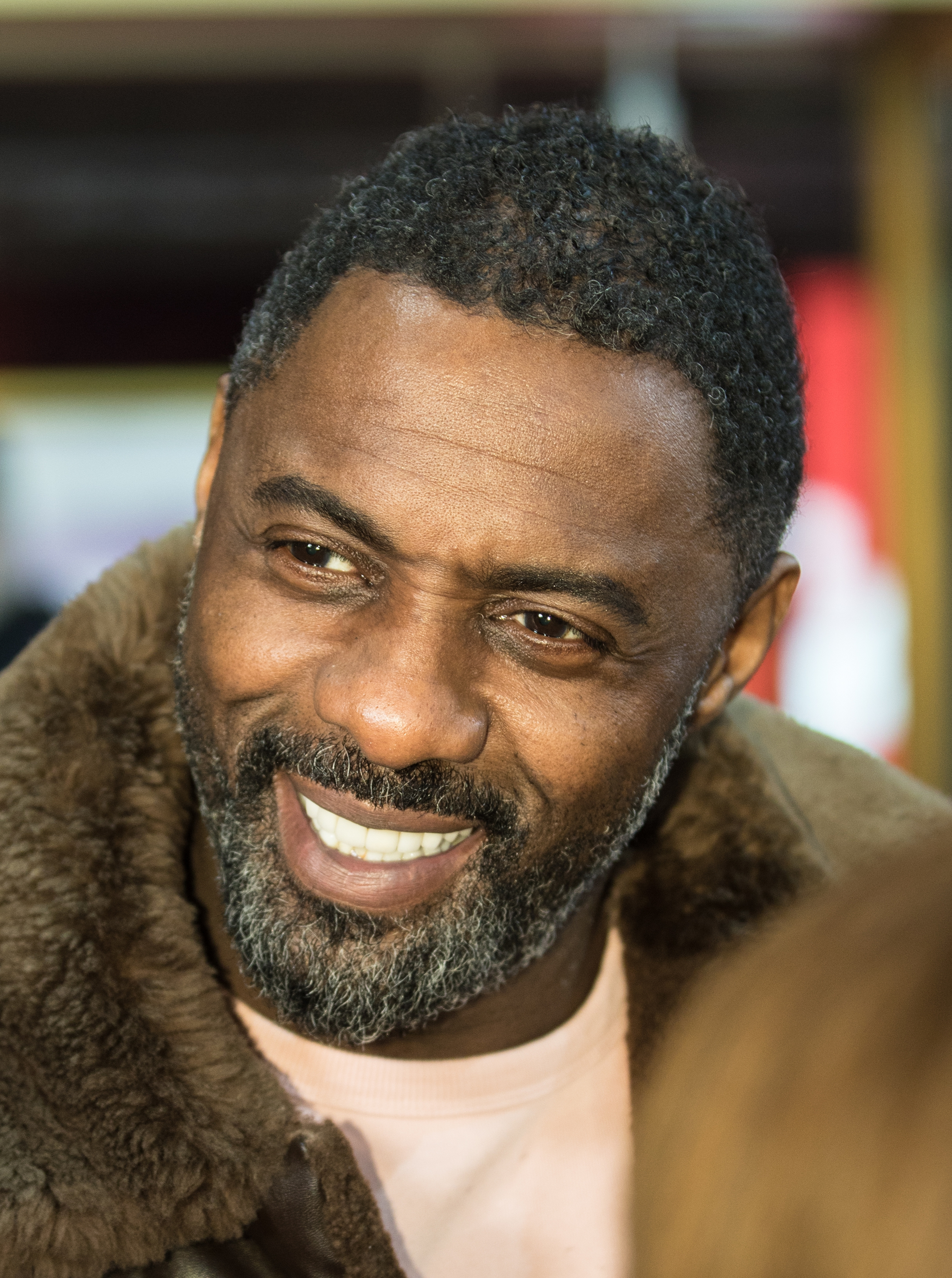
Idris Elba (pictured in 2018) reprised his role as Knuckles from the film franchise and was the executive producer.

During development on Sonic the Hedgehog 2 (2022), the production team decided to expand the Sonic the Hedgehog film franchise by developing television series. The producers decided to have the first Sonic spin-off star Knuckles the Echidna due to them having enjoyed the character's comedic portrayal in the film and wanting to homage the Sonic the Hedgehog 3/Sonic & Knuckles double-feature by releasing the show around the same time as Sonic the Hedgehog 3 (2024). By February 2022, development had begun on a Sonic the Hedgehog series focusing on Knuckles for release on Paramount+ in 2023. Sega and Paramount Pictures officially announced the series' development at the ViacomCBS Investor Day presentation in February, with Idris Elba confirmed to be reprising his role as Knuckles from the then-upcoming Sonic the Hedgehog 2 and the series serving as a spin-off of the film. In June 2022, Paramount CEO Brian Robbins referred to the series as a miniseries.

In April 2023, Sonic the Hedgehog 2 co-writer John Whittington was announced as the series' developer and head writer. Whittington also executive produced the series alongside Elba and Sonic film franchise creatives Neal H. Moritz and Toby Ascher of Original Film, Jeff Fowler, and Toru Nakahara. Paramount Pictures and Sega of America would serve as production companies on the series. In February 2024, it was reported that Ascher had received a co-developer credit alongside Whittington and served as the series' showrunner. The producers developed the series as if it was a third film in the franchise, though its limitations on budget due to being a TV show meant the screen time for the CGI characters had to be more limited. In April 2024, Ascher said future seasons of Knuckles are possible should the series prove successful and if the filmmakers had "a really great story to tell".

The fourth episode, titled "The Flames of Disaster", was written by James Madejski and directed by Jorma Taccone. The idea for the episode was to develop something just as entertaining as the feature films while also conserving the budget for visual effects for subsequent episodes, which Ascher felt allowed the team to do something "unique" and "slightly different" to the films. This inspired Ascher, a fan of Taccone's, to hire him as a director for the series. Due to scheduling issues, Taccone was able to direct only one episode, with the producers proposing him the fourth due to Taccone wanting to direct a "weird" episode, which Taccone agreed due to the challenges posed by Knuckles' limited presence.

=== Writing ===
The series had been in the writing stages by April 2022, with Whittington writing alongside Brian Schacter and James Madejski. For the show's plot, the writers decided to reuse the buddy comedy approach from Sonic the Hedgehog (2020), which was favored by the crew. Rather than having one of the characters serve as the straight man of the duo, the writers wanted both Knuckles and Wade to be "wildcards in a buddy comedy" due to its comedic potential. The writers wanted the series to be an homage to the 90s comedies film Ascher watched in his childhood, in a similar vein to the Sonic films drawing inspiration from different genres. Inspirations for the series' storyline include Happy Gilmore, The Big Lebowski, and Kingpin.

The series is set between Sonic the Hedgehog 2 and Sonic the Hedgehog 3 (2024) and includes easter eggs to set-up the events and narrative of the latter. The series also explores the ramifications of the events in Sonic the Hedgehog 2, particularly G.U.N. (Guardian Units of Nations) gaining access to Sonic and Knuckles' quills and rings. Ascher, who drew inspiration from other franchises such as Marvel Comics, said this was done as a way to expand the franchise's mythology by questioning how its events would affect the real world. In response to criticism for the series focusing more on Wade than on Knuckles, Ascher explained that the focus on Wade was needed to tell a great story that would slowly build up the world and narrative, continuing the same path and approach taken by the Sonic films and their importance on the humans.

=== Casting ===
In April 2023, it was reported that the series would follow Knuckles as he trains Wade Whipple, with Adam Pally reprising his role as Wade. Also cast in recurring roles were Edi Patterson, Julian Barratt, Scott Mescudi, and Ellie Taylor, with guest stars including Rory McCann as well as Tika Sumpter reprising her role as Maddie. Additional cast members were confirmed, including Cary Elwes, Stockard Channing, Christopher Lloyd, Paul Scheer, and Rob Huebel in June 2023. In February 2024, it was announced that Ben Schwartz and Colleen O'Shaughnessey would reprise their roles as Sonic the Hedgehog and Miles "Tails" Prower in a guest star capacity. Michael Bolton makes a cameo appearance as Wade's singing voice in the series' fourth episode, having been invited to participate by episode director Jorma Taccone, who had previously collaborated with Bolton on The Lonely Island music video "Jack Sparrow".

=== Filming, visual effects and animation ===
Production on the series began by April 2023, in London, England. Sonic the Hedgehog and Sonic the Hedgehog 2 director Jeff Fowler directed the pilot, with Ged Wright, Brandon Trost, Jorma Taccone, and Carol Banker also serving as directors. Additional filming took place in Reno, Nevada, where the final two episodes are set. The series was shot back-to-back with Sonic the Hedgehog 3. Unlike the previous two Sonic films, a puppet of Knuckles was used during filming instead of a stand-in, which allowed Pally to improvise.

Visual effects providers for the series include Industrial Light & Magic, Fin Design, Rising Sun Pictures, Outpost VFX, and Untold Studios. In order to achieve the same animation quality as the movies, the producers changed its entire production pipeline, including hiring six animation vendors instead of one as with the films. The studio also had an in-house team working on character rigs that the vendors later "worked over", allowing for a quicker animation development process and the producers to maintain quality control. This also allowed the producers to have an in-house animation team to work on both Knuckles and Sonic the Hedgehog 3, which helped the team reduce costs. The series had over 300 more digital shots than Sonic the Hedgehog.

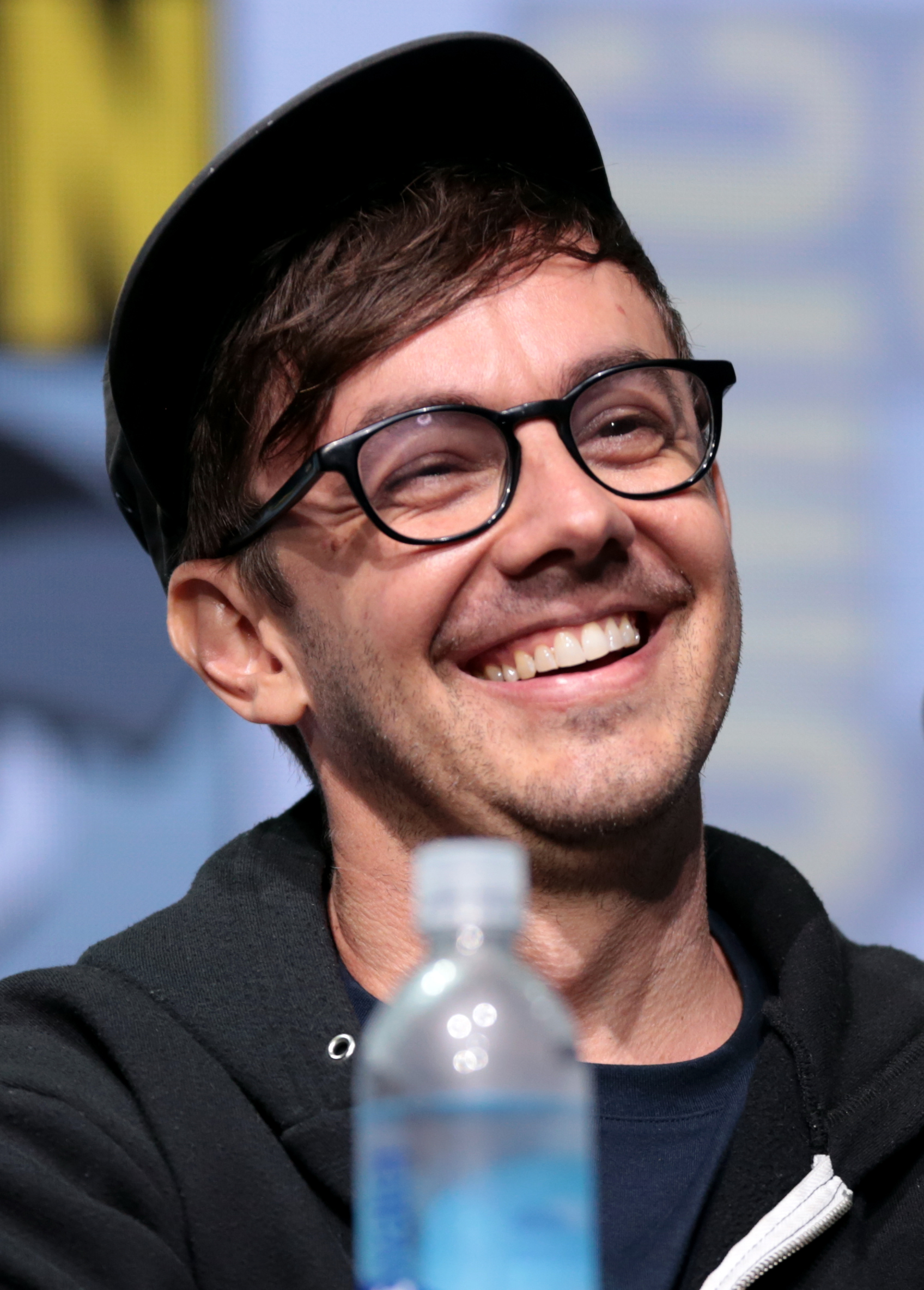
Jorma Taccone, who directed the fourth episode, "The Flames of Disaster"

The "Flames of Disaster" musical sequence from the fourth episode, which took 4 days to film, was shot by Taccone as if it was a music video, seeking to implement the pacing of one to a television episode. The opening sequence was shot in location in an active firing range area, which Taccone noted complicated shooting the scene. Visual effects and animation for the episode were provided by Industrial Light & Magic, Rising Sun Pictures, Host VFX, Fin Design, Agora Studio, and Vandivision. For the scene in the "Flames of Disaster" musical sequence where Wade goes through an scenario modeled after classic Sonic games, the filmmakers originally intended to use practical effects, but ultimately used a digital green screen with Vandivision creating the backgrounds through CGI.

The episode features the song "The Flames of Disaster", which was written by Taccone's brother, Asa, and composer Matthew Compton, and performed by Asa and Julian Barret. The song also features vocals by Michael Bolton; Taccone hired him due having developed a friendship with Bolton after the two worked together on the music video "Jack Sparrow", with Bolton agreeing to work on the song after the episode was pitched to him by the production team. Taccone had hoped to include an image of Bolton singing during the sequence, but was unable to get him a camera in time.

=== Music ===
In place of Tom Holkenborg, who composed for the Sonic films, Tom Howe had been assigned to compose the music for the series. "The Warrior" by Scandal appears as the series' opening theme. The series features two original songs: "Frickin' Human Race" performed by Asa Taccone and "The Flames of Disaster" performed by Taccone, Julian Barratt, and Michael Bolton. A soundtrack for the series was released on April 26, 2024 by Sony Classical Records.

== Release ==
=== Marketing ===
An official trailer for the series was released online on February 8, 2024, and later aired on February 11 during Super Bowl LVIII. The trailer featured Crime Mob's "Knuck If You Buck". The incorporation of the song received praise across social media platforms. Ben Travis of Empire said, "It all looks suitably cartoonish fun, all anchored in Idris Elba"s gravelly vocals in the title role." Charles Pulliam-Moore at The Verge commented on the series' six-episode length by saying that it "feels less like a full-on spinoff show and more like a solid chunk of storytelling meant to hold fans over," but added that its "brevity" and "flash action pieces" might make it a success. Alex Billington of FirstShowing.net commented that the series looks like a Saturday Night Live sketch turned into a six-episode series. At the NXT Stand & Deliver professional wrestling event on April 6, 2024, a Knuckles mascot was present in the audience for the NXT North American Championship match, which was sponsored by the show.

=== Streaming and broadcast ===
Knuckles premiered on Paramount+ on April 26, 2024, with all six episodes. On August 12, 2024, it began to air on Nickelodeon.

=== Home media ===
Knuckles was released on Ultra HD Blu-ray, Blu-ray, and DVD on September 10, 2024, by Paramount Home Entertainment. The physical releases include four behind-the-scenes featurettes and a gag reel.

== Reception ==
=== Audience viewership ===
In its premiere weekend, Knuckles became both the most watched Paramount+ original series and the service's most watched kids and family title ever, with more than 4 million hours streamed over the time frame. The series' debut also had a positive effect on the other Sonic titles on the service, with viewership up 278% over the previous daily average.

=== Critical response ===
The review aggregator Rotten Tomatoes reported an approval rating of 75% based on 32 critic reviews, with an average rating of 6.2/10. The website's critics consensus reads, "Pairing Idris Elba's terse echidna with a befuddled Adam Pally, Knuckles could use some extra punch to appeal more broadly beyond youngsters but hits just fine as light family entertainment." Metacritic, which uses a weighted average, assigned a score of 61 out of 100 based on 11 critics, indicating "generally favorable reviews".

Meredith Coons of The A.V. Club gave the series a B− rating. She commended the visuals, performances, comedy, and story and concluded her review by saying, "It's got some heart, too, which is always good, and unlike its prickly protagonist, it doesn't take itself too seriously." Ryan Leston of IGN gave the series an 8 out of 10 rating. He praised the performances of Elba and Pally as well as the chemistry between their characters, the action scenes, comedy, and use of licensed music, and wrote, "Knuckles is a fun, chaotic bonus level that nails everything that made the Sonic movies great, earning a well-deserved fist bump." Rendy Jones of RogerEbert.com compared Knuckles favorably to the mainline Sonic films because of its writing, characterization, and performances. They wrote that while the series "functions largely as a streaming-only clone of the first film, it displays a personality missing from the mainline movies by veering into welcoming absurdism and whimsy."

Brian Lowry of CNN largely disliked the series for its plot, pacing, and characters. They felt that lacking Jim Carrey from the Sonic films "to help carry the load" led to an inferior product with no discernible target audience in mind. Ferdosa of Screen Rant gave the series a 2.5 out of 5-star rating. She felt that it failed to live up to its potential due to its use of human characters, uninteresting setting, lack of creativity, and lackluster writing and comedy, though she directed praise towards Elba's performance and the CGI rendering of the animated characters. Michael Thomas of Collider gave the series a 5 out of 10 rating. He similarly felt that the series failed to reach its full potential, directing criticism at the lack of focus on the title character and the uninteresting villains. He would, however, commend the buddy comedy aspect and the action sequences.

=== Accolades ===
Knuckles was nominated for "Best Adaptation" at The Game Awards 2024. It lost to Fallout.

== See also ==
- List of television series based on video games
