= Gargamel! =

American rock band

- Origin: Orlando, Florida
- Genres: Funk metal, experimental rock
- Years active: 1993–present
- Labels: Organic Records; Richter Records; Spacetree Records
- Members: Chuck Ellis; Wayne Larson; Les Stover; Ryan Dailey; Kevin Collado
- Past members: Webb; Ray Rivera; Darin Bridges; Matt Lapham; Pat McCurdy; AndyMas

Gargamel! is an American rock band from Orlando, Florida. Their music has its foundations in funk metal, but this is frequently combined with widely divergent styles, often to comic effect. Gargamel! is always spelled with an exclamation point.

== Band history ==
The band Gargamel! has been touring the south (primarily Florida, Georgia and Carolinas) for over 15 years. They have been featured on numerous indie films and compilations. During that time they released 4 studio CD's and 2 live DVD's. Gargamel! won the Orlando Music Award for Best hard/Edge Band every year it was awarded and are consistently at the top of the Best Metal category in the Orlando Weekly's annual "Best of Orlando" feature. Gargamel! have played shows with such National acts as Anthrax, Gwar, Tub Ring, Nonpoint, Dog Fashion Disco, Bad Acid Trip, Mushroomhead, Sleepytime Gorilla Museum and many others. They are also annual featured performers at many of Orlando's major Horror Movie/Sci-Fi conventions such as Screamfest and TachyceCon.

== Band members ==
- Mandaddy - Neck (1992–present)
- Crazy Hector - 4 and 5 Strings (1995–present)
- Servo Beonic Man - Digital Manipulations (1995–present)
- Professor Knuckles - 6 Strings (2000–present)
- Marcoleptic Stick Handler - Hits Things (2019–present)

=== Former members ===
- Webb - Drums (1992–2006)
- El Diablo Guapo - Guitar (1996–2000)
- Skyjak - Guitar (1992–1996)
- Boy Howdy - Bass (1992–1995)
- Headless Spawn - Guitar (1992–1994)
- MAS - Beats (2006–2011)
- Heavie Kevie - Stick Man (2011–2018)

== Discography ==
All music by Gargamel! and all lyrics by Mandaddy unless otherwise noted.

=== Studio albums ===
==== Revulva (1997) ====
Track listing

No.	Title	Length
1.	"Intro"	0:19
2.	"Karate Summer"	3:36
3.	"Malt Liquor Knights"	5:09
4.	"Title Track"	0:06
5.	"Booee Machine"	3:33
6.	"Crotch Monkey"	6:11
7.	"i.e.Happy"	0:42
8.	"The Birth of Little Milk Belly"	0:46
9.	"Little Milk Belly"	4:07
10.	"Juan40Lawers"	2:59
11.	"Secret Hand Shake"	0:24
12.	"March of the Febermites"	4:55
13.	"An Intellectual Discussion Concerning the Execution and Creation of the Previous Auditory Elements, and Their Content."	2:08

==== Touch My Fun (2000) ====
Track listing

No.	Title	Length
1.	"Pickle of Changes"	3:30
2.	"Get On Your Motorbike"	3:15
3.	"Evil Babies"	3:34
4.	"Perfect Idiot"	2:37
5.	"Short Gnu Juan"	1:55
6.	"Midnight Sexy"	4:09
7.	"Spacepants"	3:56
8.	"Revulva"	3:53
9.	"Ape Torture"	4:55
10.	"Penetration Vehicle"	5:37
11.	"The Fly"	6:31
12.	"Pressure" (Joel)	3:00
66.	"The Medley"	11:07

==== The New Tenderness (2003) ====
Track listing

No.	Title	Length
1.	"Hey Everybody"	1:40
2.	"Grin Reaper"	4:13
3.	"Daddy Needs Money"	3:59
4.	"Chowder Cough"	3:40
5.	"Face Hugger"	4:53
6.	"Little Milk Belly (Upgrade)"	3:42
7.	"Stop the Humanoid"	1:06
8.	"Midget With A Leaf Blower"	3:23
9.	"Failure Machine"	5:55
77.	"Popsicles/Midget With A Rake/Bonus Track"	9:28

==== Fields of Happy (2007) ====
Track listing

No.	Title	Length
1.	"Da Devil's Bawlz"	5:15
2.	"We've Got A Situation Here"	4:18
3.	"Cold & Twitchy"	3:06
4.	"Favorite Fiend"	3:42
5.	"Pussy Teeth"	1:44
6.	"Dr. Ripper, OBGYN"	5:24
7.	"Too Much To Share"	4:08
8.	"Knuckle's Sandwich"	1:15
9.	"Rainy Day Fun Book"	5:03
10.	"Party Weapon"	5:23
11.	"Eat Out of My Butt"	1:09
12.	"Language of the Knife"	4:24
13.	"Get Up & Go!"	3:45
14.	"Find the Prostate"	2:07
15.	"Papa Didn't Expect Supper"	7:10
68.	"Too Much To Remix"	6:38
69.	"Meeting Music"	2:44

=== Live albums ===
==== Live Bootleg (1999) ====
Track listing

No.	Title	Length
1.	"Intro"	0:45
2.	"Penetration Vehicle"	4:17
3.	"Revulva"	5:38
4.	"Crotch Monkey"	5:59
5.	"Midnight Sexy"	6:20
6.	"Booee Machine"	3:34
7.	"Perfect Idiot"	2:49
8.	"The Fly"	8:35
9.	"Sudden Shit"	9:30
10.	"Will's Cyberdance Party"	5:14
11.	"Chixwithdixmix"	0:10
12.	"Spacepants (studio)"	3:55
13.	"Chixwithdixmix2"	0:40
14.	"Swanson"	1:54
15.	"She"	3:29
16.	"Wait A Second"	0:07
17.	"Evil Babies (remix sneak peek)"	2:32
18.	"Lots of Gargamel!"	4:36
19.	"Pressure (remix)"	4:26
20.	"Bonus Track"	4:39

==== Gargalive! (2005) ====
No.	Title	Length
1.	"We've Got A Situation Here"	4:09
2.	"Favorite Fiend"	3:54
3.	"Chowder Cough"	4:13
4.	"Midget With A Leaf Blower"	4:45
5.	"Failure Machine"	5:56
6.	"The Medley 2004"	8:40
7.	"Everybody Wants You" (Squier)	4:29
8.	"House of Blues Radio Spot"	1:02
9.	"Instrumental Remix"	0:55
10.	"Webb's Nipples"	0:04

=== EPs ===
==== First Date Music (2009) ====
No.	Title	Length
1.	"Narcoleptic Snake Handler"	3:42
2.	"The Unstoppable Exodia"	4:05
3.	"Our Lips Are Sealed" (Wiedlin/Hall)	2:40
4.	"Pirates of the Crimson Disco"	4:27
5.	"Da Devil's Bawlz (Live Video)"	6:16
6.	"Ape Torture (Live Video)"	5:29
7.	"The Fly (Live Video)"	7:36

=== Remix albums ===
==== What's That Smell? Gargamel! The Remixes (2004) ====
No.	Title	Length
1.	"Daddy Needs A Remix"	2:35
2.	"Krumpled Chowder"	3:22
3.	"Evil Babies (PMA Remix)"	4:23
4.	"Pickled and Remixed"	5:10
5.	"Pressure (Remix)"	4:28
6.	"Evil Babies (Remix)"	3:05
7.	"Jazzy Pickle"	3:05
8.	"Popsickening"	1:38
9.	"Pickled Smurfette Dance"	5:30
10.	"Midget With A Rake"	3:16
11.	"Against Each Other Jam '97"	1:04
12.	"Satan '93"	9:19
13.	"Crazy Outro '99"	3:26
14.	"Mechanical Mood Music For A Dead Bird in Flight"	4:31
