= Eken =

Eken is a surname. Notable people with the surname include:

- Bülent Eken (1923–2016), Turkish footballer and manager
- Kent Eken (born 1963), American politician
- Korkut Eken (born 1945), Turkish security officer
- Reha Eken (1925–2013), Turkish footballer and manager
- Tompa Eken (born 1950), Swedish musician
- Willis Eken (1931–2010), American politician

== See also ==
- Eken Mine (1935–2002), Japanese voice actor
- The Eken, a 2022 Indian detective film based on the fictional detective Eken Babu
