= Sonic the Hedgehog (film series) =

Film series based on video game franchise

- Logo as seen in the first film
- Original work: Sonic the Hedgehog (2020)
- Owners: Paramount Pictures (Skydance); Sega Sammy Group
- Years: 2020–present
- Based on: Sonic the Hedgehog by Sega

Print publications
- Comics: Sonic the Hedgehog: The Adventures of Sonic & Donut Lord (2020); Sonic the Hedgehog 2: The Official Movie Pre-Quill (2022); Sonic X Shadow TOKYO MISSION: Episode 0 (2024)

Films and television
- Films: Sonic the Hedgehog (2020); Sonic the Hedgehog 2 (2022); Sonic the Hedgehog 3 (2024); Sonic the Hedgehog 4 (2027); Untitled spin-off film (2028)
- Short films: Around the World in 80 Seconds (2020); Sonic Drone Home (2022); A Very Sonic Christmas (2024)
- Television series: Knuckles (2024)

Audio
- Soundtracks: Sonic the Hedgehog; Sonic the Hedgehog 2; Knuckles; Sonic the Hedgehog 3

Sonic the Hedgehog is an action-adventure comedy film series created and developed by Paramount Pictures and Sega Sammy Group. It is part of Sega's Sonic the Hedgehog franchise and primarily consists of three films, with a fourth in production, and a spin-off TV series. Jeff Fowler directed all three films and the pilot of Knuckles. Since the first film's release in 2020, the series has grossed over $1 billion worldwide and received a generally positive critical reception.

== Background ==
Development for a Sonic the Hedgehog film dates back to 1993, when Michealene Risley, consumer products director of Sega of America, negotiated with several Hollywood producers. Risley had helped license Sonic for the animated series Adventures of Sonic the Hedgehog. Sega of America CEO Tom Kalinske feared damaging the brand, citing the commercial and critical failures of previous video game film adaptations such as Super Mario Bros. (1993) and Street Fighter (1994). Despite Kalinske's concerns, Sega was enthusiastic. In August 1994, Sega struck a development deal with Metro-Goldwyn-Mayer and Trilogy Entertainment Group, with Pen Densham as executive producer. The film was to be titled Sonic the Hedgehog: Wonders of the World, and would follow Sonic coming out of Sonic X-Treme (a canceled Sega Saturn video game the film was supposed to tie-in with) and into the real world, teaming up with a kid named Josh to stop Doctor Robotnik from stealing the wonders of the world. MGM later cancelled the film after a failed attempt to give the film to DreamWorks Pictures.

In 2002, Ben Hurst pitched an animated Sonic film to DIC Entertainment that would be a continuation of the Sonic the Hedgehog TV series, on which he worked as a writer. DiC put Hurst in contact with a Sega executive interested in the idea. Hurst was contacted by Ken Penders, writer of the Archie Comics' Sonic the Hedgehog comic book series, who had been alerted of Hurst's plans. Though Hurst told him his strategy and offered to include him in his effort, Penders told Sega that Hurst was trying to co-opt the franchise, leading Sega to dismiss Hurst and his proposal. In September 2003, Penders pitched his own concept for a Sonic film, Sonic Armageddon. In Penders' words, the film would have been an origin story and a series reset, resolving the plot threads which began in the animated Sonic show and continued in Archie's comic series. The project was dropped in 2007 due to a corporate upheaval and the death of Sega licensing manager Robert Leffler, who had supported Penders. Penders later confirmed that the film was not pitched to DreamWorks at all.

== Development ==
In 2013, Sony Pictures acquired the rights to produce and distribute a Sonic film. On June 10, 2014, a live-action animated film was announced as a joint venture between Sony Pictures and Marza Animation Planet, a Japan-based subsidiary of Sega Sammy Holdings which had produced CGI cutscenes for several Sonic games. It would be produced by Neal H. Moritz by his Original Film banner alongside Takeshi Ito, Mie Onishi, and Toru Nakahara, and written by Evan Susser and Van Robichaux. In February 2016, Sega CEO Hajime Satomi said the film was scheduled for 2018. Blur Studio's Tim Miller and Jeff Fowler were hired in 2016 to develop it, with the film being the latter's feature directorial debut and Miller serving as executive producer. Blur Studio previously produced cutscenes for the games Shadow the Hedgehog (2005), for which Fowler directed cutscenes, and Sonic the Hedgehog (2006). Patrick Casey, Josh Miller, and Oren Uziel were writing the screenplay, while Casey and Miller wrote the story.

On October 2, 2017, Paramount Pictures announced that they had acquired the rights after Sony put the film in turnaround. Filming began in September 2018. Following the release of the first trailer in April 2019, the film was delayed from its November 2019 release date to re-design Sonic after his original design was heavily criticized. The film was released in February 2020 to a mixed-to-positive reception. The film features a post-credits scene featuring Miles "Tails" Prower, with Fowler, Casey, Miller, and stars Ben Schwartz and James Marsden expressed interest in a sequel that further explored the video game's world.

A sequel was confirmed in May 2020, with most of the production team and cast returning from the first film.

=== Expansion into television ===
During development on Sonic the Hedgehog 2, the producers became interested in developing television series set in the films' universe that served as character studies for the cast, with the films serving as "these Avengers-level events" while the shows explore the franchise's supporting characters and give them more depth.

== Films ==
Film	U.S. release date	Director	Screenwriter(s)	Story by	Producer(s)	Status
Sonic the Hedgehog	February 14, 2020	Jeff Fowler	Pat Casey and Josh Miller	Pat Casey and Josh Miller	Neal H. Moritz, Toby Ascher, Toru Nakahara and Takeshi Ito	Released
Sonic the Hedgehog 2	April 8, 2022	Jeff Fowler	Pat Casey, Josh Miller and John Whittington	Pat Casey and Josh Miller	Neal H. Moritz, Toby Ascher, Toru Nakahara and Hitoshi Okuno	Released
Sonic the Hedgehog 3	December 20, 2024	Jeff Fowler	Pat Casey, Josh Miller and John Whittington	Pat Casey and Josh Miller	Neal H. Moritz, Toby Ascher, Toru Nakahara and Hitoshi Okuno	Released
Sonic the Hedgehog 4	March 19, 2027	Jeff Fowler	TBA	TBA	Neal H. Moritz, Toby Ascher and Toru Nakahara	Post-production
Untitled spinoff film	December 22, 2028	TBA	TBA	TBA	TBA	In development

=== Sonic the Hedgehog (2020) ===
Having superhuman speed, Sonic is forced to abandon his home world of Mobius and ends up on Earth. After being discovered on Earth, he teams up with a human named Tom Wachowski to stop Doctor Robotnik, who wants to harness his powers. The first film in the series, it was released in theaters on February 14, 2020.

Originally intended for release on November 8, 2019, Sonic the Hedgehog was pushed back to February 14, 2020, due to the overwhelmingly negative response to Sonic's design in the first trailer. Upon its release, the film was met with mixed reviews from critics, but was a box-office success, becoming the sixth highest-grossing film of 2020.

=== Sonic the Hedgehog 2 (2022) ===
Sonic joins forces with Tails to stop Dr. Robotnik, who recruits Knuckles the Echidna to find a powerful emerald that has the power to build and destroy civilizations.

Following the success of the first film, Paramount had confirmed that a sequel was in development in May 2020, with Fowler set to return as director alongside writers Casey and Josh Miller. Neal H. Mortiz, Toby Ascher, and Toru Nakahara produced the sequel, having previously co-produced the first film alongside Takeshi Ito, while Tim Miller, Hajime Satomi, and Haruki Satomi returned from the first film as executive producers. Most of the first film's cast returned to reprise their roles, with Idris Elba joining the voice cast as Knuckles the Echidna. Filming began in March 2021, in Vancouver, Canada. The film premiered internationally on March 30, 2022, followed by a world premiere on April 5, 2022, and released in theaters in the United States on April 8.

=== Sonic the Hedgehog 3 (2024) ===
Sonic, Tails, and Knuckles take on a mysterious and powerful adversary, Shadow the Hedgehog, while Dr. Ivo Robotnik reunites with his lost grandfather, Prof. Gerald Robotnik, unaware that Gerald has a sinister agenda of his own.

In February 2022, Sega and Paramount confirmed that a third Sonic the Hedgehog film was in active development, with Schwartz reprising his role, who expressed interest in it being subtitled "The Next Level." In April 2022, after Carrey announced that he was considering retiring from acting, producers Moritz and Ascher confirmed that his role as Dr. Robotnik would not be recast in any sequels if he followed through with his retirement plans. However, they remained hopeful that they could develop a script good enough for him to continue the role. On August 8, 2022, it was announced that the film would released in theaters on December 20, 2024. The character Shadow the Hedgehog also appears following his cameo in the mid-credit scene of Sonic the Hedgehog 2, with Keanu Reeves revealed to be providing the voice for the character in April 2024. In June 2023, it was reported that filming would begin in late August 2023 in London. Due to the 2023 SAG-AFTRA strike, filming would start in September 2023 without actors. In February 2024, it was officially confirmed that Carrey would be reprising his role for the film, while Krysten Ritter, Alyla Browne, James Wolk, Sofia Pernas, Cristo Fernández, and Jorma Taccone were cast. The film is set after the events of Knuckles (2024), and its story draws elements from the video games Sonic Adventure 2 (2001) and Shadow the Hedgehog (2005).

=== Sonic the Hedgehog 4 (2027) ===
In September 2024, producer Toby Ascher stated intent for additional installments in the franchise following the release of Sonic the Hedgehog 3. In December 2024, the film was officially greenlit, slated for Spring 2027. In January 2025, it was announced that the film would be released on March 19, 2027.

It is confirmed that Amy Rose and Metal Sonic, who both appeared in the mid-credits scene of the previous film, will appear in this film. While nothing has yet been officially disclosed about the film's story, fans and journalists have widely speculated that it will take inspiration from Sonic CD (1993), which was the first appearance of both characters within the video game series. Fowler acknowledged the connection, saying that their simultaneous introduction was intended to "honor that chronology", but stated that the film's story would not be solely based on CD. In January 2025, Carrey expressed interest in returning as Robotnik if the film's premise interested him. In February 2026, Kristen Bell was announced to be voicing Amy. On March 2, Fowler announced that production on the film had begun. Filming wrapped in May.

=== Untitled spinoff film (2028) ===
In April 2025, The Wrap reported that Paramount is planning a spinoff film. In December, it was announced that a new film announced as "Sonic Universe Event Film" would be released on December 22, 2028.

== Short films ==
=== Around the World in 80 Seconds (2020) ===
The home media release of the first film includes a short film titled Around the World in 80 Seconds, which follows a drawing of Sonic traveling the world in 80 seconds before returning to Green Hills.

=== Sonic Drone Home (2022) ===
On May 23, 2022, a digital release was announced with an animated short film called Sonic Drone Home following the events of the second film with Sonic, Tails, and Knuckles trying to deal with a badnik upgrading itself at the Green Hills Junkyard.

=== A Very Sonic Christmas (2024) ===
A stop motion short titled A Very Sonic Christmas was released on December 11, 2024, with Schwartz, Elba, Colleen O'Shaughnessey, and Reeves reprising their roles and Wade Whipple actor Adam Pally voicing Santa Claus. Animated in a similar style to the Rudolph the Red-Nosed Reindeer television special, the short sees Sonic showing Tails and Knuckles how to celebrate their first Christmas, including holiday sweaters, tree decorating, and Santa. Sonic uses one of his rings to summon Santa, but he injures his ankle upon falling through the ring, seemingly canceling Christmas. Team Sonic volunteers to deliver the presents, including to the Robotniks (which is just coal). After finishing delivering the presents, the team drops Santa off back at the North Pole, where they find Shadow stealing Santa's sleigh with his motorcycle.

== Television series ==
Series	Season	Episodes	Originally released	Showrunner(s)
Knuckles	1	6	April 26, 2024	Toby Ascher

=== Knuckles (2024) ===
Knuckles the Echidna takes Green Hills deputy officer Wade Whipple as his apprentice, teaching him the ways of the Echidnas.

On February 15, 2022, during ViacomCBS' investor day, a television series centered around Knuckles was revealed to be in development for Paramount+, with it set for release in 2024. John Whittington was announced as head writer and executive producer in April 2023, with Toby Ascher announced as showrunner and co-developer alongside Wittington in February 2024. Additional executive-producers include Idris Elba and Sonic film director Jeff Fowler, who directed the pilot. Filming began in April 2023 in London, England.

The series is set between the events of Sonic the Hedgehog 2 (2022) and Sonic the Hedgehog 3 (2024). Elba, Adam Pally, Tika Sumpter, Ben Schwartz, and O'Shaughnessey reprise their respective roles from the films as Knuckles, Wade Whipple, Maddie, Sonic, and Tails. Christopher Lloyd voices Pachacamac, who previously made a silent cameo during the first film's prologue. All six episodes premiered on April 26, 2024, on Paramount+.

=== Future ===
In April 2024, Toby Ascher stated that either additional seasons of Knuckles or more television series based on other characters were possible if Knuckles would be a success, and as long as the filmmakers had a "really great story to tell." In December 2024, Elba and Reeves expressed interest in starring together in a spinoff television series featuring Knuckles and Shadow. In an interview with ComicBook, O'Shaughnessey expressed interest in voicing Tails in a spin-off series that could potentially explore the character's origins within the film series.

== Other media ==
=== Comics ===
In an exclusive Steelbook release for the first film, a short comic was included, titled Sonic the Hedgehog: The Adventures of Sonic & Donut Lord.

As a promotional tie-in to Sonic the Hedgehog 2, a prequel comic called Sonic the Hedgehog 2: The Official Movie Pre-Quill was released on March 30, 2022, which is written by Kiel Phegley with artwork by Adam Bryce Thomas, Tracy Yardley and Evan Stanley.

As a promotional tie-in to Sonic the Hedgehog 3 handed out to moviegoers in Japan, a prequel manga called Sonic X Shadow TOKYO MISSION: Episode 0 was released on December 27, 2024, written and illustrated by Yuki Imada.

=== Video games ===
Multiple characters from the films have been added to the mobile games Sonic Dash and Sonic Forces: Speed Battle as part of promotional events for each film. Cosmetic items based on the 2020 film were released as downloadable content (DLC) for Sonic Colors Ultimate (2021).

A Sonic the Hedgehog 3-themed DLC pack for Shadow Generations (2024) was released on December 12, 2024. The pack includes an additional level set in Tokyo as it appears in the film; during the level, Shadow's appearance changes to resemble his movie counterpart, with Reeves reprising his voice.

== Cast and characters ==
List indicators

This section includes characters who will appear or have appeared in in the franchise.

- An empty grey cell indicates the character was not in the film, or that the character's official presence has not yet been confirmed.
- ^{A} indicates an appearance through archival footage or audio.
- ^{C} indicates a cameo role.
- ^{P} indicates an appearance in onscreen photographs.
- ^{U} indicates an uncredited appearance.
- ^{V} indicates a voice-only role.
- ^{Y} indicates a younger version of the character.
- ^{S} indicates an appearance as a character's singing voice.

Characters	Films				Short films			Television series
Characters	Sonic the Hedgehog	Sonic the Hedgehog 2	Sonic the Hedgehog 3	Sonic the Hedgehog 4	Around the World in 80 Seconds^{V}	Sonic Drone Home^{V}	A Very Sonic Christmas^{V}	Knuckles
Characters	2020	2022	2024	2027	2020	2022	2024	
Principal characters
Sonic the Hedgehog	Ben Schwartz^{V}	Ben Schwartz^{V}	Ben Schwartz^{V}	Ben Schwartz^{V}	Ben Schwartz^{V}	Ben Schwartz^{V}	Ben Schwartz^{V}	Ben Schwartz^{V}
Sonic the Hedgehog	Benjamin L. Valic^{Y}^{V}	Benjamin L. Valic^{A}^{Y}^{V}	Ben Schwartz^{V}	Ben Schwartz^{V}	Ben Schwartz^{V}	Ben Schwartz^{V}	Ben Schwartz^{V}	Ben Schwartz^{V}
Dr. Ivo "Eggman" Robotnik	Jim Carrey	Jim Carrey	Jim Carrey	Jim Carrey				Jim Carrey^{A}
Tom Wachowski	James Marsden	James Marsden	James Marsden	James Marsden			James Marsden^{P}	James Marsden^{A}
Maddie Wachowski	Tika Sumpter	Tika Sumpter	Tika Sumpter	Tika Sumpter			Tika Sumpter^{P}	Tika Sumpter
Agent Stone	Lee Majdoub	Lee Majdoub	Lee Majdoub	Lee Majdoub				
Miles "Tails" Prower	Colleen O'Shaughnessey^{C}^{V}	Colleen O'Shaughnessey^{V}	Colleen O'Shaughnessey^{V}	Colleen O'Shaughnessey^{V}		Alicyn Packard^{V}	Colleen O'Shaughnessey^{V}	Colleen O'Shaughnessey^{V}
Knuckles the Echidna		Idris Elba^{V}	Idris Elba^{V}	Idris Elba^{V}		Fred Tatasciore^{V}	Idris Elba^{V}	Idris Elba^{V}
Shadow the Hedgehog		Silent cameo	Keanu Reeves^{V}	Keanu Reeves^{V}			Keanu Reeves^{V}	
Amy Rose			Silent cameo	Kristen Bell^{V}				
Metal Sonic			Silent cameo	TBA				
Supporting characters
Wade Whipple	Adam Pally	Adam Pally	Adam Pally	TBA				Adam Pally Kit Rakusen^{Y} Michael Bolton^{S}^{U}
Rachel Handel	Natasha Rothwell	Natasha Rothwell	Natasha Rothwell^{C} (Note: As a disguise used by Maddie.)	TBA				
Commander Walters	Tom Butler	Tom Butler	Tom Butler (Note: Appears as both Walters and a disguise used by Tom.) James Wolk^{Y}					
Longclaw	Donna J. Fulks^{V}	Donna J. Fulks^{V}	Silent cameo					Silent cameo
Jojo Handel	Melody Nosipho Niemann	Melody Nosipho Niemann		TBA				
Randall Handel		Shemar Moore	Shemar Moore^{C} (Note: As a disguise used by Tom.)	TBA				
Gerald Robotnik			Jim Carrey					
Maria Robotnik			Alyla Browne					
Director Rockwell			Krysten Ritter (Note: Appears as both Rockwell and as a disguise used by Maddie.)	TBA				
Pachacamac	Silent cameo	Silent cameo ^{A}		TBA				Christopher Lloyd^{V}
Wendy Whipple		Mentioned						Stockard Channing
Agent Mason								Scott Mescudi
Agent Willoughby								Ellie Taylor
Wanda Whipple								Edi Patterson Darcy Castle^{Y}
"The Buyer"								Rory McCann
"Pistol" Pete Whipple								Cary Elwes
Jack Sinclair								Julian Barratt
Susie Barnes								Alice Tregonning
Minor characters
Secretary of Homeland Security	Elfina Luk							
Major Bennington	Neal McDonough							
Crazy Carl	Frank C. Turner							
U.S. Army Chief of Staff	Peter James Bryant							
U.S. Navy Chief of Staff	Garry Chalk							
Air Force Chief of Staff	Michael Hogan							
Armored Truck Driver		Jeff Sanca						
Drench		Brad Kalilimoku						
G.U.N. Mean Bean Agent		Sarah Surh						
Faucet		Krista Alvarez						
Kyle Lancebottom			Jorma Taccone					
Gabriella (Note: Appears only as an in-universe TV show character.)			Sofia Pernas					
Pablo			Cristo Fernández					
Juan			Cristo Fernández					
Unit						Aaron Landon		
Santa Claus							Adam Pally	
Bill Barnes								Fergus Craig
Mrs. Barnes								Jaimi Barbakoff
Gary N. Sinclair III Esq.								Paul Scheer
Dylan Beagleton								Rob Huebel

== Crew ==
Role	Film			
Role	Sonic the Hedgehog (2020)	Sonic the Hedgehog 2 (2022)	Sonic the Hedgehog 3 (2024)	Sonic the Hedgehog 4 (2027)
Director	Jeff Fowler	Jeff Fowler	Jeff Fowler	Jeff Fowler
Producer(s)	Neal H. Moritz; Toby Ascher; Toru Nakahara; Takeshi Ito	Neal H. Moritz; Toby Ascher; Toru Nakahara; Hitoshi Okuno	Neal H. Moritz; Toby Ascher; Toru Nakahara; Hitoshi Okuno	Neal H. Moritz; Toby Ascher; Toru Nakahara
Writer(s)	Pat Casey; Josh Miller	Screenplay by: Pat Casey; Josh Miller; John Whittington Story by: Pat Casey; Josh Miller		
Executive Producer(s)	Hajime Satomi; Haruki Satomi; Masanao Maeda; Nan Morales; Tim Miller	Haruki Satomi; Yukio Sugino; Shuji Utsumi; Nan Morales; Tim Miller	Haruki Satomi; Yukio Sugino; Shuji Utsumi; Jeff Fowler; Tommy Gormley; Tim Miller	TBA
Cinematographer	Stephen F. Windon	Brandon Trost	Brandon Trost	Brandon Trost
Composer	Tom Holkenborg	Tom Holkenborg	Tom Holkenborg	TBA
Editor(s)	Stacey Schroeder; Debra Neil-Fisher	Jim May	Al LeVine	Al LeVine
Production companies	Paramount Pictures; Sega Sammy Group; Original Film; Marza Animation Planet; Blur Studio			
Distributor	Paramount Pictures	Paramount Pictures	Paramount Pictures	Paramount Pictures
Running time	99 minutes	122 minutes	110 minutes	TBA

== Reception ==
=== Box office performance ===
Film	Year	Box office gross			All-time ranking		Budget	Ref.
Film	Year	US / CAN	Other	Worldwide	US / CAN	Worldwide	Budget	Ref.
Sonic the Hedgehog	2020	$148,974,665	$170,741,018	$319,715,683	338	474	$85–90 million	
Sonic the Hedgehog 2	2022	$190,872,904	$214,548,614	$405,421,518	263	361	$90–110 million	
Sonic the Hedgehog 3	2024	$236,115,100	$256,047,504	$492,162,604	170	261	$122 million	
Total		$575,962,669	$640,778,518	$1,216,741,187			$297–322 million	

=== Critical and public response ===
==== Films ====
Film	Critical		Public	
Film	Rotten Tomatoes	Metacritic	CinemaScore	PostTrak
Sonic the Hedgehog	64% (252 reviews)	47 (43 reviews)	A	4/5 stars
Sonic the Hedgehog 2	69% (175 reviews)	47 (33 reviews)	A	87%
Sonic the Hedgehog 3	86% (152 reviews)	56 (28 reviews)	A	89%

==== Television series ====
Critical response of Sonic the Hedgehog
Title	Season	Rotten Tomatoes	Metacritic
Knuckles	1	75% (32 reviews)	61 (11 reviews)

=== Accolades ===
Year	Award	Category	Recipients	Result	Ref.
2020	SXSW Film Festival	Excellence in Title Design	Sonic the Hedgehog	Nominated	
2020	People's Choice Awards	The Family Movie of 2020	Sonic the Hedgehog	Nominated	
2021	Critics' Choice Super Awards	Best Superhero Movie	Sonic the Hedgehog	Nominated	
2021	Critics' Choice Super Awards	Best Villain in a Movie	Jim Carrey, Sonic the Hedgehog	Won	
2021	Critics' Choice Super Awards	Best Actor in a Superhero Movie	Ben Schwartz and Jim Carrey, Sonic the Hedgehog	Nominated	
2021	Hollywood Critics Association Awards	Best Animated or VFX Performance	Ben Schwartz	Won	
2021	Hollywood Critics Association Awards	Best Blockbuster	Sonic the Hedgehog	Nominated	
2021	Hollywood Critics Association Awards	Best Visual Effects	Ged Wright, Sonic the Hedgehog	Nominated	
2021	Nickelodeon Kids' Choice Awards	Favorite Movie	Sonic the Hedgehog	Nominated	
2021	Nickelodeon Kids' Choice Awards	Favorite Movie Actor	Jim Carrey, Sonic the Hedgehog	Nominated	
2021	Ursa Major Awards	Best Motion Picture	Sonic the Hedgehog	Nominated	
2021	Saturn Awards	Best Fantasy Film Release	Sonic the Hedgehog	Nominated	
2022	The Game Awards	Best Adaptation	Sonic the Hedgehog 2	Nominated	
2022	Golden Trailer Awards	Best Animation/Family Poster	WORKS ADV, Sonic the Hedgehog 2	Nominated	
2023
2023	Black Reel Awards	Outstanding Voice Performance	Idris Elba, Sonic the Hedgehog 2	Nominated	
2023	Movieguide Awards	Best Movies for Families	Sonic the Hedgehog 2	Won (Note: Tied with Puss in Boots: The Last Wish (2022))	
2023	Nickelodeon Kids' Choice Awards	Favorite Movie	Sonic the Hedgehog 2	Won	
2023	Nickelodeon Kids' Choice Awards	Favorite Movie Actor	Jim Carrey, Sonic the Hedgehog 2	Nominated	
2024	The Game Awards	Best Adaptation	Knuckles	Nominated	
2025	Nickelodeon Kids' Choice Awards	Favorite Movie	Sonic the Hedgehog 3	Nominated	
2025	Nickelodeon Kids' Choice Awards	Favorite Movie Actor	Jim Carrey	Nominated	
2025	Nickelodeon Kids' Choice Awards	Favorite Male Voice from an Animated Movie	Ben Schwartz	Nominated	
2025	Nickelodeon Kids' Choice Awards	Favorite Male Voice from an Animated Movie	Keanu Reeves	Nominated	
2025	Nickelodeon Kids' Choice Awards	Favorite Villain	Jim Carrey	Won	
2025	Nickelodeon Kids' Choice Awards	Favorite Song from a Movie	"Run It" – Jelly Roll	Nominated	

== Music ==
=== Soundtracks ===
==== Films ====
Title	U.S. release date	Length	Composer(s)	Label
Sonic the Hedgehog (Music from the Motion Picture)	February 14, 2020	42:54	Tom Holkenborg / Junkie XL	Paramount Music
Sonic the Hedgehog 2 (Music from the Motion Picture)	April 8, 2022	57:33	Tom Holkenborg / Junkie XL	Paramount Music
Sonic the Hedgehog 3 (Music from the Motion Picture)	December 20, 2024	1:03:03	Tom Holkenborg / Junkie XL	Milan Records

==== Television series ====
Title	U.S. release date	Length	Composer(s)	Label
Knuckles (Music from the Paramount+ Original Series)	April 26, 2024	1:11:06	Tom Howe	Sony Classical

=== Singles ===
Title	U.S. release date	Length	Artist(s)	Label	Film
"Speed Me Up"	January 24, 2020	2:46	Wiz Khalifa, Ty Dolla Sign, Lil Yachty and Sueco the Child	Atlantic	Sonic the Hedgehog
"Stars in the Sky"	March 24, 2022	3:05	Kid Cudi	Republic, UMG Recordings	Sonic the Hedgehog 2
"Run It"	November 22, 2024	2:39	Jelly Roll	Republic, UMG Recordings	Sonic the Hedgehog 3
