= Hypersonic (disambiguation) =

Hypersonic speeds are highly supersonic.

Hypersonic may also refer to:

== Speed ==
- Hypersonic flight
- Hypersonic wind tunnel

== Sound ==
- Hypersonic sound, a method for creating audible sound from ultrasound
- Hypersonic effect, a psychological effect induced by ultrasound
- HyperSonic Sound, a trade name for a device that produces modulated ultrasound that can make its carried signal audible without needing a receiver set

== Other uses ==
- Hypersonic Broadcasting Center, Philippine radio network
- Hypersonic weapon, missiles and projectiles which travel at between 5 and 25 times the speed of sound
- Hypersonic XLC, a roller coaster in Virginia, U.S.
- HSQLDB, previously known as the Hypersonic SQL Project, a relational database management system
- Hyper Sonic, a super transformation in the video game Sonic 3 & Knuckles
- Hyper Sonic (film), a 2002 direct-to-video film starring Antonio Sabàto, Jr. and Adam Baldwin
- Hypersonic, a VST instrument by Steinberg
- "Hypersonic," a track on the 2003 Jane's Addiction album Strays

== See also ==
- Hyperspeed (disambiguation)
- Super Speed (disambiguation)
- Supersonic (disambiguation)
- Ultrasonic (disambiguation)
- Sonic (disambiguation)
- Hyper (disambiguation)
