= Ultrasonic (disambiguation) =

Ultrasonic means of or relating to ultrasound.

Ultrasonic may also refer to:

- Ultra-Sonic (band), a Scottish electronic music band
- Ultrasonic (film), a 2012 American film
- Ultrasonic Broadcasting System, a Philippine radio network carrying the Energy FM brand
- Ultrasonic Studios, a recording studio in New Orleans, Louisiana
- Ultrasonics (journal), a scientific journal

== See also ==
- Ultrasound (disambiguation)
- Hypersonic (disambiguation)
- Supersonic (disambiguation)
- Sonic (disambiguation)
- Ultra (disambiguation)
