= Sonic the Hedgehog 2 (disambiguation) =

Sonic the Hedgehog 2 is a 1992 video game by Sega for the Genesis (Mega Drive).

Sonic the Hedgehog 2 may also refer to:

- Sonic the Hedgehog 2 (film), a 2022 action-adventure film directed by Jeff Fowler
  - Sonic the Hedgehog 2 (soundtrack), the soundtrack to the 2022 film composed by Tom Holkenborg
- Sonic the Hedgehog 2 (8-bit video game), a 1992 video game for the Master System and Game Gear

== See also ==
- Sonic the Hedgehog (disambiguation)
