= Ultra =

Ultra may refer to:

== Computing ==
- Adobe Ultra, a vector-keying application
- Sun Ultra, a brand of computer workstations and servers
- ULTRA (machine translation system), a machine translation system

== Arts and media ==
=== Music ===
==== Albums and songs ====
- Ultra (Depeche Mode album), 1997
- Ultra, a 2009 album by Laura Põldvere
- Ultra (Ultra album), 1999
- Ultra (Zomby album), 2016
- Ultra, by Mickey Kojak, 2022
- Ultra, by Schaft, 2016
- "Ultra", a song by KMFDM, 1994
- "Ultra", a song by Stray Kids from Hop, 2024

==== Other uses in music ====
- Ultra (British band), an English pop band
- Ultra Music Festival, an annual electronic festival in Miami, Florida
- Ultra Worldwide, a series of annual electronic music festivals each called Ultra
- Ultra, a collaboration between two members of hip hop group Ultramagnetic MCs, who released the album Big Time
- Ultra (music), a post-punk movement in the Netherlands
- Ultra house, a music place in Handen, Sweden
- Ultra Records, a record label

=== Fiction, film, and television ===
- Ultra (film), a 1991 Italian drama film
- Ultra (comics), a miniseries by Image Comics
- Ultra Series, the Ultraman franchise
- Ultra the Multi-Alien, a DC Comics superhero
- DR Ultra, a defunct Danish children's television channel
- Ultra (TV channel), a Serbian children's channel
- Ultra Distributors, a home video distribution company in India
- Ultra Jhakaas, a OTT platform
- Ultra Media & Entertainment, a film production company

=== Other media ===
- Ultra (magazine), avant-garde Finnish-Swedish magazine in Finland
- Ultra (podcast), a 2022 Rachel Maddow podcast series chronicling U.S. right-wing extremism during the 1930s and 1940s
- Ultra Games, a subsidiary of Konami of America

== Politics, government, and military ==
- Ultra (Malaysia), a Malaysian group of racial extremists
- Ultra-royalists or Ultras, a reactionary group after Napoleon's defeat
- ULTRA (UK agency), the Unrelated Live Transplant Regulatory Authority, a defunct UK government regulatory body
- Ultra (cryptography), the codename for cryptographic intelligence obtained from signal traffic in World War II
- Ultra Electronics, a British defence and aerospace company

== Sport ==
- Ultras, football fans renowned for ultra-fanatical support, sometimes to the point of violence
- The ULTRA (University of Life Training and Recreational Arena), former name for the PhilSports Arena in Pasig, Philippines
- Ultra Motorsports, a NASCAR team that ran from 1995–2005
- Ultra running, endurance races at distances typically beyond marathon

== Other uses ==
- Ultra (personal rapid transit), a personal rapid transit system deployed at London Heathrow airport
- Ultra-prominent peak, a mountain with a topographic prominence of at least 1,500 metres
- Ultra Food & Drug, a defunct supermarket chain in Ontario, Canada
- Dzyne ULTRA, a developmental unmanned aerial vehicle

== See also ==
- Ultraa, a DC Comics character
- Ultras (disambiguation)
- MKULTRA (disambiguation)
