= Sonic the Hedgehog (disambiguation) =

Sonic the Hedgehog is a Japanese video game series and media franchise created by Sega.

Sonic the Hedgehog may also refer to:

- Sonic the Hedgehog (character), the title character and main protagonist of the franchise

== Video games ==
- Sonic the Hedgehog (1991 video game), a 1991 platform video game for the Sega Genesis (Mega Drive)
- Sonic the Hedgehog (8-bit video game), a 1991 platform video game for the Sega Master System and Game Gear
- Sonic the Hedgehog (2006 video game), a 2006 platform video game developed by Sonic Team for the Xbox 360 and PlayStation 3
- Sonic the Hedgehog, a 2008 educational video game for the LeapFrog Didj

== Printed media ==
- Sonic the Hedgehog (Archie Comics), comic book series published in the United States by Archie Comics
- Sonic the Hedgehog (IDW Publishing), comic book series published in the United States by IDW Publishing

== Film and television ==
- Sonic the Hedgehog (TV series), a 1993 American animated television series
- Sonic the Hedgehog: The Movie, a 1996 Japanese original video animation
- Sonic the Hedgehog (film series), an action-adventure film series
  - Sonic the Hedgehog (film), a 2020 action-adventure film, the first in the series
    - Sonic the Hedgehog (soundtrack), the soundtrack to the 2020 film

== See also ==
- Sonic hedgehog, one of three proteins in a mammalian signaling pathway
- Sonic (disambiguation)
- Sonic the Hedgehog 2 (disambiguation)
- Sonic the Hedgehog 4 (disambiguation)
