= Austin Peterson (politician) =

American politician

Member-elect of the Minnesota Senate from the 4th district
- Assuming office January 12, 2027
- Succeeding: Rob Kupec

Personal details
- Party: Republican
- Website: austin4mn.com

Austin Peterson is an American politician who is the representative-elect for the 4th district in the Minnesota State Senate. A member of the Minnesota Republican Party, he was elected in 2026, defeating the incumbent, Democrat Rob Kupec. Peterson owns a small business and is a member of the Hawley, Minnesota, School Board.
