= Sonic the Hedgehog 4 =

Sonic the Hedgehog 4 may refer to:

- Sonic the Hedgehog 4, a planned trilogy of episodic video games:
  - Sonic the Hedgehog 4: Episode I, the first game in the series
  - Sonic the Hedgehog 4: Episode II, the second game in the series
  - Sonic the Hedgehog 4: Episode III, a planned but ultimately unproduced third game in the series
- Sonic the Hedgehog 4 (film), an upcoming film in the live-action Sonic film series
- Sonic the Hedgehog 4, an unlicensed Super Nintendo Entertainment System game

== See also ==
- Sonic the Hedgehog (disambiguation)
- List of Sonic the Hedgehog video games
