= Rob Kupec =

American politician (born 1968)

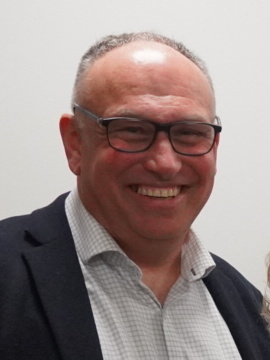

Member of the Minnesota Senate from the 4th district
- Incumbent
- Assumed office January 4, 2023
- Preceded by: Kent Eken
- Succeeded by: Austin Peterson (elect)

Personal details
- Born: November 27, 1968 (age 57)
- Party: Democratic (DFL)
- Spouse: Deb White
- Children: 1
- Education: State University of New York-Albany
- Profession: Meteorologist

Robert J. Kupec (/ˈkuːpɛk/ KOO-pek; born November 27, 1968) is a Minnesota politician and meterologist who serves as a member of the Minnesota Senate. A member of the Democratic-Farmer-Labor Party (DFL), he represents Senate District 4, which includes most of Clay and Becker Counties. Before seeking elected office, he was for a decade the chief meteorologist at KVRR and previously at WDAY-TV.

== Early life, education, and career ==
Kupec was born in eastern Connecticut. Both of his parents were active union organizers. He attended college at the State University of New York-Albany, studying Atmospheric Science, and earned a degree in 1992. He moved to Moorhead, Minnesota, in 2000, and began work as a meteorologist, first for WDAY-TV and then as chief meteorologist for KVRR.

== Political career ==
Before moving to Minnesota, Kupec ran as a Green Party candidate for the Albany County Legislature in 1999.

In 2022, incumbent DFL state senator Kent Eken decided not to seek reelection. Kupec ran, and was unopposed in the DFL primary. He defeated Moorhead City Councilman and Republican nominee Dan Bohmer in the general election with 52.5% of the vote to Bohmer's 46.8%.

In 2026, Kupec appeared to have narrowly lost his reelection campaign to Republican nominee Austin Peterson by four votes. The election is subject to a recount.

Kupec serves on the following committees:

- Vice Chair: Agriculture, Broadband, and Rural Development
- Health and Human Services
- Higher Education
- Labor

== Personal life ==
He is married to Deb White, a Moorhead City Councilwoman. They have one son.
