= Supersonic (disambiguation) =

Supersonic refers to any speed over the speed of sound.

Supersonic may also refer to:

== Music ==
- Supersonic (band), a Hungarian indie rock band
- Supersonic Festival (Birmingham), an annual music festival in Birmingham, England
- Supersonic Festival (Seoul), an annual music festival in Seoul, South Korea
- Supersonic Records, a sublabel of GUN Records

=== Albums ===
- Supersonic (J. J. Fad album) or the title song (see below), 1988
- Supersonic (Younha album) or the title song, 2012
- Supersonic (single album) or the title song (see below), by Fromis 9, 2024
- Supersonic, by Shola Ama, 2002

=== Songs ===
- "Supersonic" (J. J. Fad song), 1988
- "Supersonic" (Jamiroquai song), 1999
- "Supersonic" (Oasis song), 1994
- "Supersonic" (Fromis 9 song), 2024
- "Supersonic", by Bad Religion from The Process of Belief, 2002
- "Supersonic", by Basement Jaxx from Kish Kash, 2003
- "Supasonic", by Beverley Knight from Affirmation, 2004
- "Super-Sonic", by the Brian Jonestown Massacre from Give It Back!, 1997
- "Supersonics" by Caravan Palace from Chronologic, 2019
- "Supersonic", by Cowboy Mouth from Voodoo Shoppe, 2006
- "Supersonic", by Family Force 5 from Business Up Front/Party in the Back, 2006
- "Supersonic", by the Lads from Marvel, 2001
- "Supersonic", by the Mr. T Experience from Big Black Bugs Bleed Blue Blood, 1989
- "Super Sonic", by Music Instructor from Electric City of Music Instructor, 1998
- "Supersonic", by the Nymphs from The Nymphs, 1991
- "Supersonic", by Pearl Jam from Backspacer, 2009
- "Supersonic", by Sophie Ellis-Bextor from Trip the Light Fantastic, 2007
- "Supersonic", by Suddenly, Tammy! from We Get There When We Do, 1995
- "Supersonic (My Existence)", by Skrillex, 2021
- "Supersonics", by the Presidents of the United States of America from II, 1996

== Toys and games ==
- Super Sonic, a transformation of the video game character Sonic the Hedgehog
- "Super Sonic", an episode of the animated TV series Sonic the Hedgehog
- Supersonic Software, a partner company of the software developer Codemasters
- Supersonic the Joystick, a wireless controller for the Nintendo Entertainment System made by Camerica

== Other uses ==
- Super Sonic TV, Albanian music television channel
- SuperSonic (ISP), a South African Internet service provider
- Supersonic (TV series), a 1975–1977 British pop-music programme
- Supersonic Electronics, a consumer electronics manufacturer
- Seattle SuperSonics, a defunct U.S. professional basketball team
- Ivy Supersonic (born 1967), born Ivy Silberstein, American fashion designer and self-promoter
- Oasis: Supersonic, a 2016 documentary film

== See also ==
- Super (disambiguation)
- Super Speed (disambiguation)
- Hypersonic (disambiguation)
- Ultrasonic (disambiguation)
- Sonic (disambiguation)
