= Hyperspeed (disambiguation) =

Hyperspeed is a 1991 videogame.

Hyperspeed or variations may also refer to:

- Hyper Speed GranDoll, 1997 original animation video
- Hypersonic speed
- "Hyperspeed (G-Force Part 2)", 1992 song by the Prodigy from Experience

== See also ==
- Super Speed (disambiguation)
- Hyper (disambiguation)
- Speed (disambiguation)
- Hypersonic (disambiguation)
- HS (disambiguation)
