= Minnesota's 4th Senate district =

American legislative district

Minnesota's 4th State Senate district
Senator
Rob Kupec; DFL–Moorhead
since 2023
- Population (2020): 85,214

The Minnesota Senate, District 4, includes most of Becker and Clay counties in the northwestern part of the state. It is currently represented by Rob Kupec of the DFL.

== List of senators ==
Session	Image	Senator	Party	Term start	Term end	Home	Location
1st		Erastus N. Bates	Rep	December 2, 1857	December 6, 1859	Minneapolis	Hennepin
1st		Delano T. Smith	Rep	December 2, 1857	December 6, 1859	Minneapolis	Hennepin
2nd		Riley Lucas Bartholomew	Rep	December 7, 1859	January 7, 1861	Richfield	Hennepin
2nd		Jesse Bishop	Non	December 7, 1859	January 7, 1861	Minneapolis	Hennepin
3rd		David Heaton	Rep	January 8, 1861	January 5, 1863	St. Anthony	Anoka Benton Hennepin Isanti Manomin (defunct) Mille Lacs Sherburne
4th		David Heaton	Rep	January 8, 1861	January 5, 1863	St. Anthony	Anoka Benton Hennepin Isanti Manomin (defunct) Mille Lacs Sherburne
5th		David Heaton	Rep	January 8, 1861	January 5, 1863	St. Anthony	Anoka Benton Hennepin Isanti Manomin (defunct) Mille Lacs Sherburne
6th		John Sargent Pillsbury	Rep	January 6, 1863	January 4, 1869	St. Anthony	Anoka Benton Hennepin Isanti Manomin (defunct) Mille Lacs Sherburne
7th		John Sargent Pillsbury	Rep	January 6, 1863	January 4, 1869	St. Anthony	Anoka Benton Hennepin Isanti Manomin (defunct) Mille Lacs Sherburne
8th		John Sargent Pillsbury	Rep	January 6, 1863	January 4, 1869	St. Anthony	Anoka Benton Hennepin Isanti Manomin (defunct) Mille Lacs Sherburne
9th		John Sargent Pillsbury	Rep	January 6, 1863	January 4, 1869	St. Anthony	Anoka Benton Hennepin Isanti Manomin (defunct) Mille Lacs Sherburne
10th		John Sargent Pillsbury	Rep	January 6, 1863	January 4, 1869	St. Anthony	Anoka Benton Hennepin Isanti Manomin (defunct) Mille Lacs Sherburne
11th		William Lochren	Dem	January 5, 1869	January 2, 1871	St. Anthony	Anoka Benton Hennepin Isanti Manomin (defunct) Mille Lacs Sherburne
12th		William Lochren	Dem	January 5, 1869	January 2, 1871	St. Anthony	Anoka Benton Hennepin Isanti Manomin (defunct) Mille Lacs Sherburne
13th		John Sargent Pillsbury	Rep	January 3, 1871	January 1, 1872	St. Anthony	Anoka Benton Hennepin Isanti Manomin (defunct) Mille Lacs Sherburne
14th		Sherman Page	Rep	January 3, 1871	January 5, 1874	Austin	Mower
15th		Sherman Page	Rep	January 3, 1871	January 5, 1874	Austin	Mower
15th		N.K. Noble	Rep	January 2, 1872	January 5, 1874	Austin	Mower
16th		E.H. Wells	Non	January 6, 1874	January 3, 1876	Lansing	Mower
17th		E.H. Wells	Non	January 6, 1874	January 3, 1876	Lansing	Mower
18th		Robert I. Smith	Rep	January 4, 1876	January 7, 1878	Austin	Mower
19th		Robert I. Smith	Rep	January 4, 1876	January 7, 1878	Austin	Mower
20th		George W. Clough	Rep	January 8, 1878	January 6, 1879	Austin	Mower
21st		W.H. Officer	Non	January 7, 1879	January 1, 1883	Austin	Mower
22nd		W.H. Officer	Non	January 7, 1879	January 1, 1883	Austin	Mower
23rd		W.P. Sergeant	Non	January 2, 1883	January 3, 1887	Albert Lea	Freeborn
24th		W.P. Sergeant	Non	January 2, 1883	January 3, 1887	Albert Lea	Freeborn
25th		Marcellus Halvorson	Rep	January 4, 1887	January 6, 1891	Bancroft	Freeborn
26th		Marcellus Halvorson	Rep	January 4, 1887	January 6, 1891	Bancroft	Freeborn
27th		H.C. Nelson	Alliance	January 6, 1891	January 7, 1895	Hayward	Freeborn
28th		H.C. Nelson	Alliance	January 6, 1891	January 7, 1895	Hayward	Freeborn
29th		Thorvald V. Knatvold	Rep	January 8, 1895	January 2, 1899	Albert Lea	Freeborn
30th		Thorvald V. Knatvold	Rep	January 8, 1895	January 2, 1899	Albert Lea	Freeborn
31st		Joseph Underleak	Rep	January 3, 1899	January 2, 1903	Chatfield	Olmstead
32nd		Joseph Underleak	Rep	January 3, 1899	January 2, 1903	Chatfield	Olmstead
33rd		Horace Witherstine	Dem	January 3, 1903	January 2, 1911	Rochester	Olmstead
34th		Horace Witherstine	Dem	January 3, 1903	January 2, 1911	Rochester	Olmstead
35th		Horace Witherstine	Dem	January 3, 1903	January 2, 1911	Rochester	Olmstead
36th		Horace Witherstine	Dem	January 3, 1903	January 2, 1911	Rochester	Olmstead
37th		Alonzo Thomas Stebbins	Rep	January 3, 1911	January 4, 1915	Rochester	Olmstead
38th		Alonzo Thomas Stebbins	Rep	January 3, 1911	January 4, 1915	Rochester	Olmstead
39th		James I. Vermilya	Non	January 5, 1915	January 6, 1919	Quincy	Olmstead
40th		James I. Vermilya	Non	January 5, 1915	January 6, 1919	Quincy	Olmstead
41st		Arthur C. Gooding	Rep	January 7, 1919	January 1, 1923	Rochester	Olmstead
42nd		Arthur C. Gooding	Rep	January 7, 1919	January 1, 1923	Rochester	Olmstead
43rd		Allen J. Furlow	Rep	January 2, 1923	April 22, 1925	Rochester	Olmstead
44th		Allen J. Furlow	Rep	January 2, 1923	April 22, 1925	Rochester	Olmstead
44th	Vacant		April 22, 1925	January 4, 1927			Olmstead
45th		William B. Richardson	Rep	January 4, 1927	September 19, 1945	Rochester	Olmstead
46th		William B. Richardson	Rep	January 4, 1927	September 19, 1945	Rochester	Olmstead
47th		William B. Richardson	Rep	January 4, 1927	September 19, 1945	Rochester	Olmstead
48th		William B. Richardson	Rep	January 4, 1927	September 19, 1945	Rochester	Olmstead
49th		William B. Richardson	Rep	January 4, 1927	September 19, 1945	Rochester	Olmstead
50th		William B. Richardson	Rep	January 4, 1927	September 19, 1945	Rochester	Olmstead
51st		William B. Richardson	Rep	January 4, 1927	September 19, 1945	Rochester	Olmstead
52nd		William B. Richardson	Rep	January 4, 1927	September 19, 1945	Rochester	Olmstead
53rd		William B. Richardson	Rep	January 4, 1927	September 19, 1945	Rochester	Olmstead
54th		William B. Richardson	Rep	January 4, 1927	September 19, 1945	Rochester	Olmstead
55th		Walter Burdick	Con	January 7, 1947	January 5, 1959	Rochester	Olmstead
56th		Walter Burdick	Con	January 7, 1947	January 5, 1959	Rochester	Olmstead
57th		Walter Burdick	Con	January 7, 1947	January 5, 1959	Rochester	Olmstead
58th		Walter Burdick	Con	January 7, 1947	January 5, 1959	Rochester	Olmstead
59th		Walter Burdick	Con	January 7, 1947	January 5, 1959	Rochester	Olmstead
60th		Walter Burdick	Con	January 7, 1947	January 5, 1959	Rochester	Olmstead
61st		Sandy Keith	Lib	January 6, 1959	January 7, 1963	Rochester	Olmstead
62nd		Sandy Keith	Lib	January 6, 1959	January 7, 1963	Rochester	Olmstead
63rd		Harold G. Kreiger	Con	January 8, 1963	January 4, 1971	Rochester	Olmstead
64th		Harold G. Kreiger	Con	January 8, 1963	January 4, 1971	Rochester	Olmstead
65th		Harold G. Kreiger	Con	January 8, 1963	January 4, 1971	Rochester	Olmstead
66th		Harold G. Kreiger	Con	January 8, 1963	January 4, 1971	Rochester	Olmstead
67th		Harold G. Kreiger	Con	January 8, 1963	January 4, 1971	Rochester	Olmstead
68th		Jerry Willet	DFL	January 5, 1971	November 15, 1987	Park Rapids	Becker Clearwater Hubbard Mahnomen
69th		Jerry Willet	DFL	January 5, 1971	November 15, 1987	Park Rapids	Beltrami Cass Hubbard Itasca Morrison Wadena
70th		Jerry Willet	DFL	January 5, 1971	November 15, 1987	Park Rapids	Beltrami Cass Hubbard Itasca Morrison Wadena
71st		Jerry Willet	DFL	January 5, 1971	November 15, 1987	Park Rapids	Beltrami Cass Hubbard Itasca Morrison Wadena
72nd		Jerry Willet	DFL	January 5, 1971	November 15, 1987	Park Rapids	Beltrami Cass Hubbard Itasca Morrison Wadena
73rd		Jerry Willet	DFL	January 5, 1971	November 15, 1987	Park Rapids	Beltrami Cass Hubbard
74th		Jerry Willet	DFL	January 5, 1971	November 15, 1987	Park Rapids	Beltrami Cass Hubbard
75th		Jerry Willet	DFL	January 5, 1971	November 15, 1987	Park Rapids	Beltrami Cass Hubbard
75th		Bob Decker	Ind Rep	November 16, 1987	January 7, 1991	Bemidji	Beltrami Cass Hubbard
76th		Bob Decker	Ind Rep	November 16, 1987	January 7, 1991	Bemidji	Beltrami Cass Hubbard
77th		Skip Finn	DFL	January 8, 1991	July 1, 1996	Cass Lake	Beltrami Cass Hubbard Itasca Wadena
78th		Skip Finn	DFL	January 8, 1991	July 1, 1996	Cass Lake	Beltrami Cass Hubbard Itasca Wadena
79th		Skip Finn	DFL	January 8, 1991	July 1, 1996	Cass Lake	Beltrami Cass Hubbard Itasca Wadena
79th		Vacant		July 1, 1996	January 7, 1997		Beltrami Cass Hubbard Itasca Wadena
80th		David Ten Eyck	DFL	January 7, 1997	October 27, 1999	East Gull Lake	Beltrami Cass Hubbard Itasca Wadena
81st		David Ten Eyck	DFL	January 7, 1997	October 27, 1999	East Gull Lake	Beltrami Cass Hubbard Itasca Wadena
81st		Vacant		October 27, 1999	December 12, 1999		Beltrami Cass Hubbard Itasca Wadena
81st		Tony Kinkel	DFL	December 12, 1999	January 6, 2003	Park Rapids	Beltrami Cass Hubbard Itasca Wadena
82nd		Tony Kinkel	DFL	December 12, 1999	January 6, 2003	Park Rapids	Beltrami Cass Hubbard Itasca Wadena
83rd		Carrie Ruud	Rep	January 7, 2003	January 2, 2007	Breezy Point	Beltrami Cass Crow Wing Hubbard Itasca
84th		Carrie Ruud	Rep	January 7, 2003	January 2, 2007	Breezy Point	Beltrami Cass Crow Wing Hubbard Itasca
85th		Mary Olson	DFL	January 3, 2007	January 3, 2011	Bemidji	Beltrami Cass Crow Wing Hubbard Itasca
86th		Mary Olson	DFL	January 3, 2007	January 3, 2011	Bemidji	Beltrami Cass Crow Wing Hubbard Itasca
87th		John Carlson	Rep	January 4, 2011	January 7, 2013	Bemidji	Beltrami Cass Crow Wing Hubbard Itasca
88th		Kent Eken	DFL	January 8, 2013	January 4, 2023	Twin Valley	Becker Clay Norman
89th		Kent Eken	DFL	January 8, 2013	January 4, 2023	Twin Valley	Becker Clay Norman
90th		Kent Eken	DFL	January 8, 2013	January 4, 2023	Twin Valley	Becker Clay Norman
91st		Kent Eken	DFL	January 8, 2013	January 4, 2023	Twin Valley	Becker Clay Norman
92nd		Kent Eken	DFL	January 8, 2013	January 4, 2023	Twin Valley	Becker Clay Norman
93rd		Rob Kupec	DFL	January 4, 2023	Incumbent	Moorhead	Becker Clay
