= Ultrasound (disambiguation) =

Ultrasound is sound with frequencies greater than 20 kHz.

Ultrasound may also refer to:

- Medical ultrasound, ultrasound-based diagnostic techniques
- Gravis UltraSound, a PC sound card
- Ultrasound (film), a 2021 American science fiction film
- Ultrasound (band), an English rock band
- Ultrasound (album), a 2025 album by The Neighbourhood
- "Ultrasound", a song by Eraserheads from the 2001 album Carbon Stereoxide

== See also ==
- Ultrasonic (disambiguation)
