= Ultras (disambiguation) =

Ultras are fanatical association football (soccer) fans.

Ultras may also refer to:

== Fiction ==
- Ultras, a fictional political party in favour of radical population control in the Isaac Asimov novelette The Key (short story)
- Ultras (comics), a fictional superhuman species from the Ultraverse by Malibu Comics
- Ultras (film), a 2020 Italian drama film

== Politics ==
- Ultras (Malaysia), Malay racial extremists during the 1960s
- Ultras or ultra-leftists, a pejorative term used by Marxist–Leninists to describe others on the far-left with positions they deem to be extreme or uncompromising
- Ultras or Fire-Eaters, a group of secessionists in the Southern United States who emerged during the Compromise of 1850
- Ultra-royalist, a French parliamentary faction in the early 19th century
- Ultra-Tories, a section of the British Tory party that broke away after the Catholic Relief Act 1829
- Groups militantly opposed to Algerian independence during the Algerian War, such as the Organisation armée secrète (OAS)

== Sports ==
- Ultras (ice hockey), fanatical ice hockey fans
- Ultramarathon, a footrace that is longer than the traditional marathon length of 26.2 miles (42.2 km)

== Other uses ==
- Ultra prominent peak, a mountain summit with topographic prominence greater than 1,500 metres (4,900 ft)

== See also ==
- Ultra (disambiguation)
