= Tompa Eken =

Swedish musician

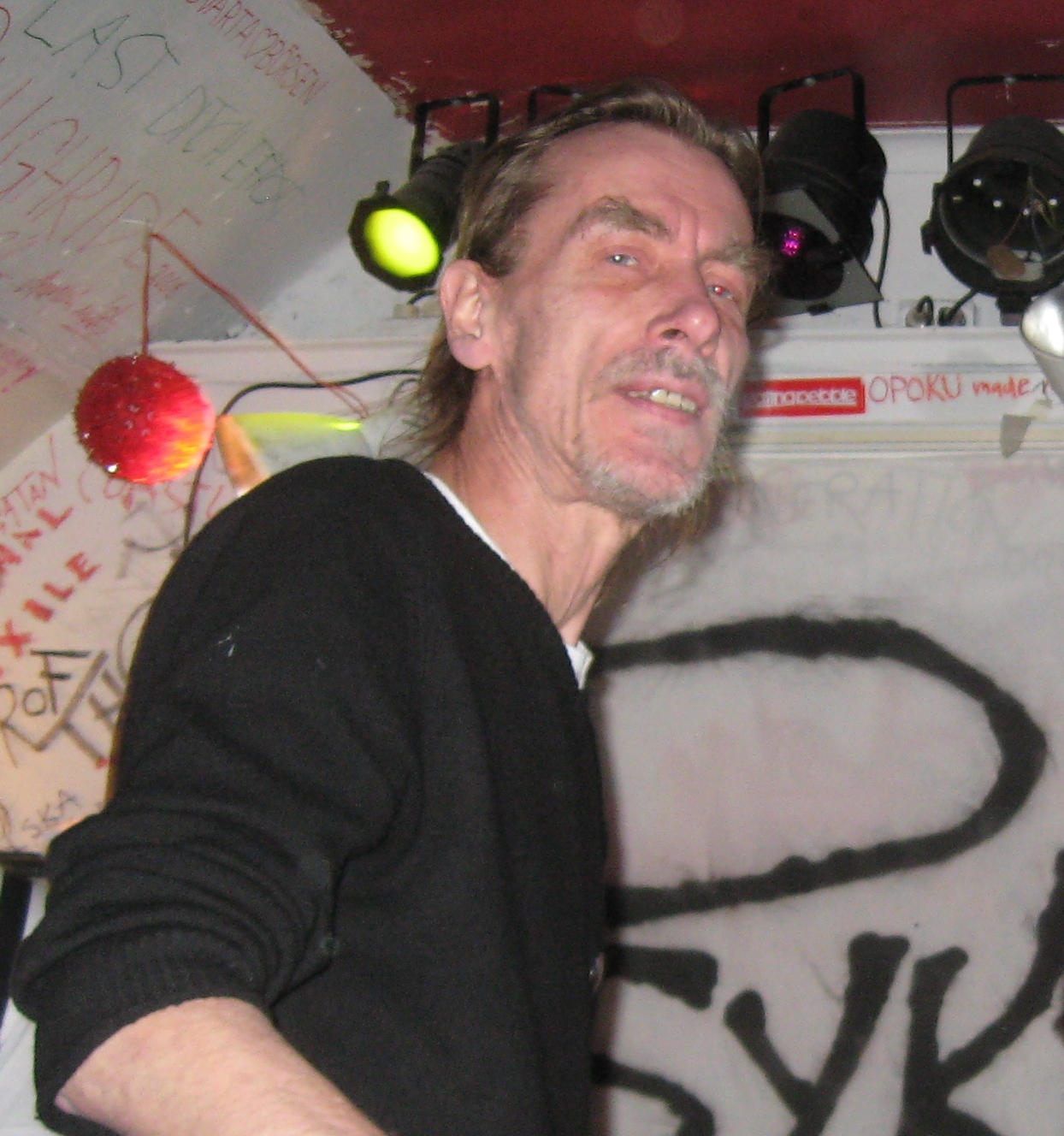
Tompa Eken on stage with Psykbryt in April 2010.

Tommy Ekengren, born 17 July 1950 and more known as Tompa Eken, is one of the driving forces behind Kafé 44 in Stockholm and a central figure in the Stockholm punk and the garage rock scene. Prior to Kafe 44 Tompa was also one of the forces behind the Ultra house in Haninge, where he made the legendary ultra buns. Tompa still bakes them himself to each event and serves to both band and audience.

In 1988 he was awarded the Dagens Nyheter's culture prize Guldkängan. In the magazine Buss på Stockholm he was placed on eight place when they listed the 100 most important people of Stockholm through the ages.

As a thanks for his dedication to young, aspiring punk-rock band and has among other the trallpunk band De lyckliga kompisarna written a tribute to him. He has also played in bands as Rudan -80 and Dödsknarkarna.

== Discography ==
- Dödsknarkarna (1985), Sista bussen – with Dödsknarkarna
- Ultra-Gärdet 1988 (1988), K.U.K Records – compilation
- Ultrasingeln (1988), Sista bussen – with U.B.F.
