= Dog Man (soundtrack) =

2025 soundtrack album by Tom Howe

Dog Man (Original Motion Picture Soundtrack)

Soundtrack album by Tom Howe
- Released: January 31, 2025
- Genre: Soundtrack
- Length: 50:24
- Label: Back Lot
- Producers: Dwilly; Tom Howe

Tom Howe chronology
Knuckles (2024)	Dog Man (Original Motion Picture Soundtrack) (2025)	Zombies 4: Dawn of the Vampires (2025)

Singles from Dog Man (Original Motion Picture Soundtrack)
- 1. "Supa Good!!!" Released: January 24, 2025

Dog Man (Original Motion Picture Soundtrack) is the soundtrack album for the 2025 DreamWorks Animation film Dog Man, based on the children's graphic novel series Dog Man by Dav Pilkey. The album features an original score composed by Tom Howe and was released through Back Lot Music on January 31, 2025.

== Development ==
The original score for Dog Man was scored by Tom Howe. He replaced Theodore Shapiro, who scored the previous installment Captain Underpants: The First Epic Movie (2017). The soundtrack was released into a 29-track album through Back Lot Music on January 31, 2025. The single "Supa Good!!!" was released alongside the soundtrack.

== Track listing ==
All music composed by Tom Howe, except where noted.

Dog Man (Original Motion Picture Soundtrack) track listing
No.	Title	Writer(s)	Producer	Length
1.	"Supa Good!!!" (performed by Yung Gravy)	Matthew Hauri; James Brown; David Wilson; Brandon Stewart	Dwilly	2:30
2.	"Roger That"		Tom Howe	1:23
3.	"Big Jump"		Tom Howe	1:32
4.	"Bomb Squad"		Tom Howe	1:28
5.	"Reporting on Dogman"		Tom Howe	0:57
6.	"Doghouse Memories"		Tom Howe	0:52
7.	"Arresting Petey"		Tom Howe	2:34
8.	"Off the Case"		Tom Howe	0:54
9.	"Flippy Stolen"		Tom Howe	2:26
10.	"I Want My Life Back"		Tom Howe	2:02
11.	"Okay Papa"		Tom Howe	1:59
12.	"Secret Binoculars"		Tom Howe	1:14
13.	"Abandoned"		Tom Howe	1:19
14.	"Cats & Dogs"		Tom Howe	2:03
15.	"Best Friends"		Tom Howe	1:31
16.	"Just Like Me"		Tom Howe	1:49
17.	"Searching for Lil Petey"		Tom Howe	1:22
18.	"Flippy Is Back"		Tom Howe	1:42
19.	"The Final Showdown"		Tom Howe	3:02
20.	"They're Related!"		Tom Howe	1:56
21.	"Dog vs Building"		Tom Howe	1:16
22.	"Rise of the Evil Buildings"		Tom Howe	1:07
23.	"Getting Help"		Tom Howe	1:15
24.	"Everyone Is a Hero"		Tom Howe	2:18
25.	"Another Final Showdown"		Tom Howe	3:23
26.	"Just Need a Friend"		Tom Howe	2:11
27.	"Arresting Flippy"		Tom Howe	0:38
28.	"Petey the Do Gooder"		Tom Howe	2:42
29.	"Ruff Ruff"		Tom Howe	1:01
Total length:				50:24

== Accolades ==
Award	Date of ceremony	Category	Recipient(s)	Result	Ref.
Hollywood Music in Media Awards	November 19, 2025	Best Original Score in an Animated Film	Tom Howe	Won	
