= Super Speed =

Super Speed or variations may refer to:

- Speedster (fiction), a character whose powers primarily relate to superhuman speed
- SuperSpeed, an advertising tagline of the USB 3.0 interface standard
- Super Speed (film), a 1925 silent comedy film
- Superspeedway, a type of automobile racing track
- SuperSpeed 1, a ship

== See also ==
- Super (disambiguation)
- Hyperspeed (disambiguation)
- Supersonic (disambiguation)
- Speed (disambiguation)
