= Joseph Underleak =

American politician (1854–1951)

Joseph Underleak (March 13, 1854 – February 21, 1951) was an American lawyer, businessman, and politician.

Underleak was born in Bohemia and emigrated with his parents when he was two months old to the United States and settled in Wisconsin. In 1856, Underleak moved with his family to Chatfield, Olmsted County, Minnesota and was also involved in the mercantile, lumber, hardware, and banking businesses. He went to the Chatfield public schools, read law, taught school, and was admitted to the Minnesota bar in 1880. Undreleak lived in Chatfield, Minnesota with his wife and family. He served on the Olmsted County Commission and on the Chatfield School Board. He also served on several Chatfield city and town offices. Underleak served in the Minnesota House of Representatives from 1893 to 1898 and in the Minnesota Senate from 1899 to 1902.
