= Sista Bussen =

Swedish record label

Sista Bussen is a Swedish record company founded in 1978 in Stockholm with a Gothenburg branch. They produced and published music, mainly progg and punk. In 1981, the Gothenburg section seceded into their own company called Last Buzz. Sista Bussen were mainly a DIY record company, and the artists had to do much of the work themselves.

Among the artists signed to the company are Sky High, Liket lever with Freddie Wadling, Dom Dummaste, Köttgrottorna, Gudibrallan, Stefan Sundström, Slobobans Undergång and Leather Nun.
