= Sonic =

Sonic or Sonics may refer to:

== Companies ==
- Sonic Drive-In, an American drive-in, fast-food restaurant chain
- Sonic (ISP), an Internet provider CLEC, serving more than 100 California communities
- Sonic Foundry, a computer software company which develops programs for editing audio and video
- Sonic Healthcare, a company that provides laboratory pathology and radiology services
- Sonic Solutions, a company operating in digital-media markets
- Sonic Team, a Japanese video game developer team
- SONIC, a brand name of Sega, S.A. SONIC

== Arts and entertainment ==
=== Music ===
- The Sonics, an American band
- CHDI-FM, a radio station in Edmonton, Alberta, Canada, named SONiC 102.9
- CKKS-FM, a radio station in Chilliwack/Abbotsford/Vancouver, British Columbia, Canada

=== Other uses in arts and entertainment ===
- Sonic the Hedgehog, a video game series and media franchise
  - Sonic the Hedgehog (character), the franchise's eponymous protagonist
- Nickelodeon Sonic, an Indian children's television channel
- Sonic "Boom Boom" Renaldi, a character in the Speed Racer film adaptation

== Science and technology ==
- Sonics, a branch of acoustics
- Theory of sonics, a branch of continuum mechanics
- Sonic boom, an audible component of a shock wave in air
- Supersonic speed
- Hypersonic speed
- Sonic hedgehog, a gene and protein named after Sonic the Hedgehog
- SONIC (Ethernet controller), a 10 Mbit/s Ethernet controller
- Somali Network Information Center (SONIC), the registry for the .so ccTLD
- SONiC (operating system), free and open source network operating system based on Linux
- SonicStage, a computer program

== Sports ==
- Seattle SuperSonics, a National Basketball Association team, relocated to Oklahoma as the Thunder
- Sonic Motor Racing Services, an Australian motor racing team

== Vehicles ==
- Sonic (train), the name of a Japanese express train service operated by 883 series "Sonic" and 885 series "White Sonic" EMUs
- Chevrolet Sonic (crossover), a subcompact crossover SUV sold from 2026
- Chevrolet Sonic (2012), the North American successor to the Chevrolet Aveo
- Honda Sonic, an underbone motorcycle
- Moyes Sonic, an Australian hang glider design
- Sonic 23, a Canadian sailboat design
- Spinball Whizzer, a rollercoaster previously known as Sonic Spinball (2010–2015)

== See also ==
- Sonic the Hedgehog (disambiguation)
  - Sonic the Hedgehog 2 (disambiguation)
  - List of Sonic the Hedgehog video games
- Supersonic (disambiguation)
