= Kent Eken =

American politician (born 1963)

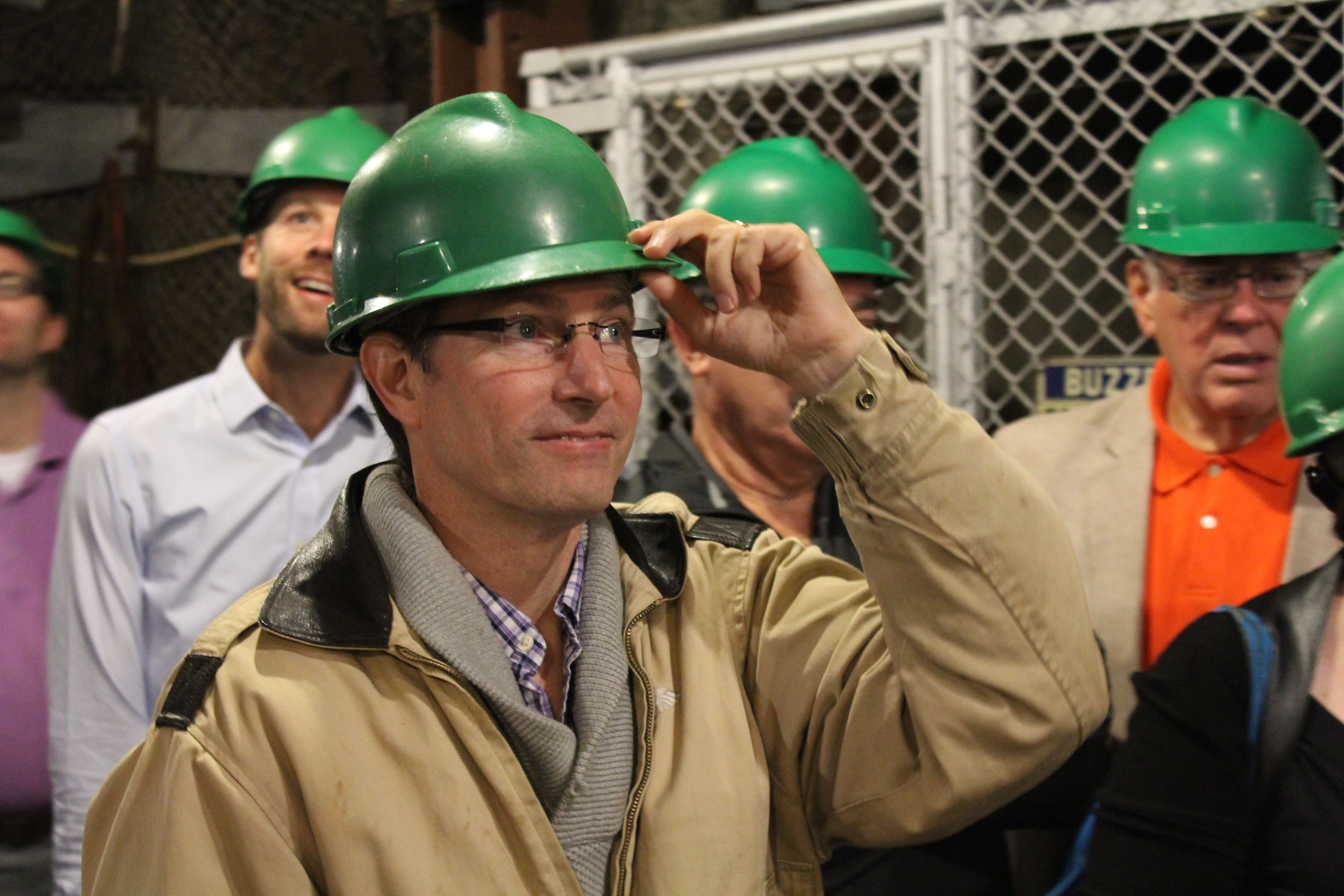

Member of the Minnesota Senate from the 4th district
- In office January 8, 2013 – January 4, 2023
- Preceded by: John Carlson
- Succeeded by: Rob Kupec

Member of the Minnesota House of Representatives from the 2A district
- In office January 7, 2003 – January 7, 2013
- Preceded by: Bernard Lieder
- Succeeded by: Roger Erickson

Personal details
- Born: December 12, 1963 (age 62)
- Party: Democratic–Farmer–Labor
- Spouse: Lori
- Children: 4
- Education: Concordia College - Moorhead; St. Cloud State University
- Profession: Educator, legislator

Bernhard Kent Eken (/ˈiːkɪn/ EEK-in; born December 12, 1963) is a Minnesota politician and former member of the Minnesota Senate. A member of the Minnesota Democratic–Farmer–Labor Party (DFL), he represented District 4, which includes portions of Becker, Clay, and Norman counties in the northwestern part of the state.

== Early life, education, and career ==
Eken attended Twin Valley High School in Twin Valley, then went on to Concordia College in Moorhead, receiving his B.A. in political science and education. He later attended St. Cloud State University in St. Cloud, earning his M.A. in history, after which he taught at Saint John's Preparatory School. In addition to his work as a teacher and adjunct college professor, he is a sugar beets truck driver during the harvest season. His father was Willis Eken, who served in the Minnesota House of Representatives.

== Minnesota House of Representatives ==
Eken was elected to the Minnesota House of Representatives, representing District 2A, in 2002, and reelected in 2004, 2006, 2008 and 2010. He served as an assistant minority leader, and was the DFL lead on the Agriculture and Rural Development Policy and Finance Committee. He was also a member of the Transportation Policy and Finance and the Ways and Means committees. He was chair of the Environment Policy and Oversight Committee from 2007 to 2010.

== Minnesota Senate ==
In 2012, Eken ran for the newly created District 4 after he was placed in the same district as fellow DFLer Paul Marquart. Eken defeated retired football player Phil Hansen in the general election, with over 52% of the vote. He was reelected in 2016 with just over 55% of the vote. In 2020, Eken was reelected with just over 54% of the vote. After his reelection, he was named a Minority Whip.

Eken served on the following committees:

- Agriculture, Rural Development, and Housing Finance and Policy
- Ranking Minority Member Family Care and Aging

He decided not to run for reelection in 2022, and was replaced by Rob Kupec.
