= Ultrahuset =

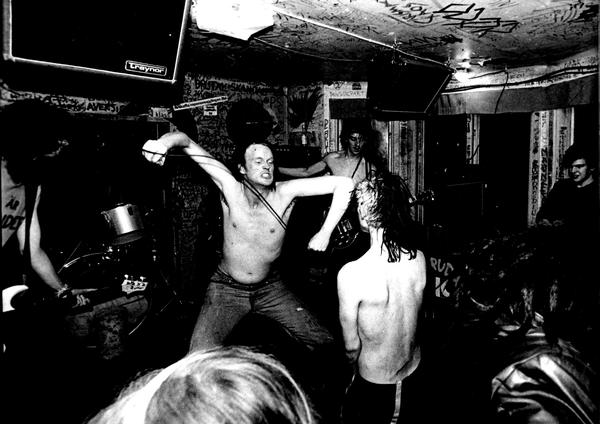
Musicians at Ultrahuset

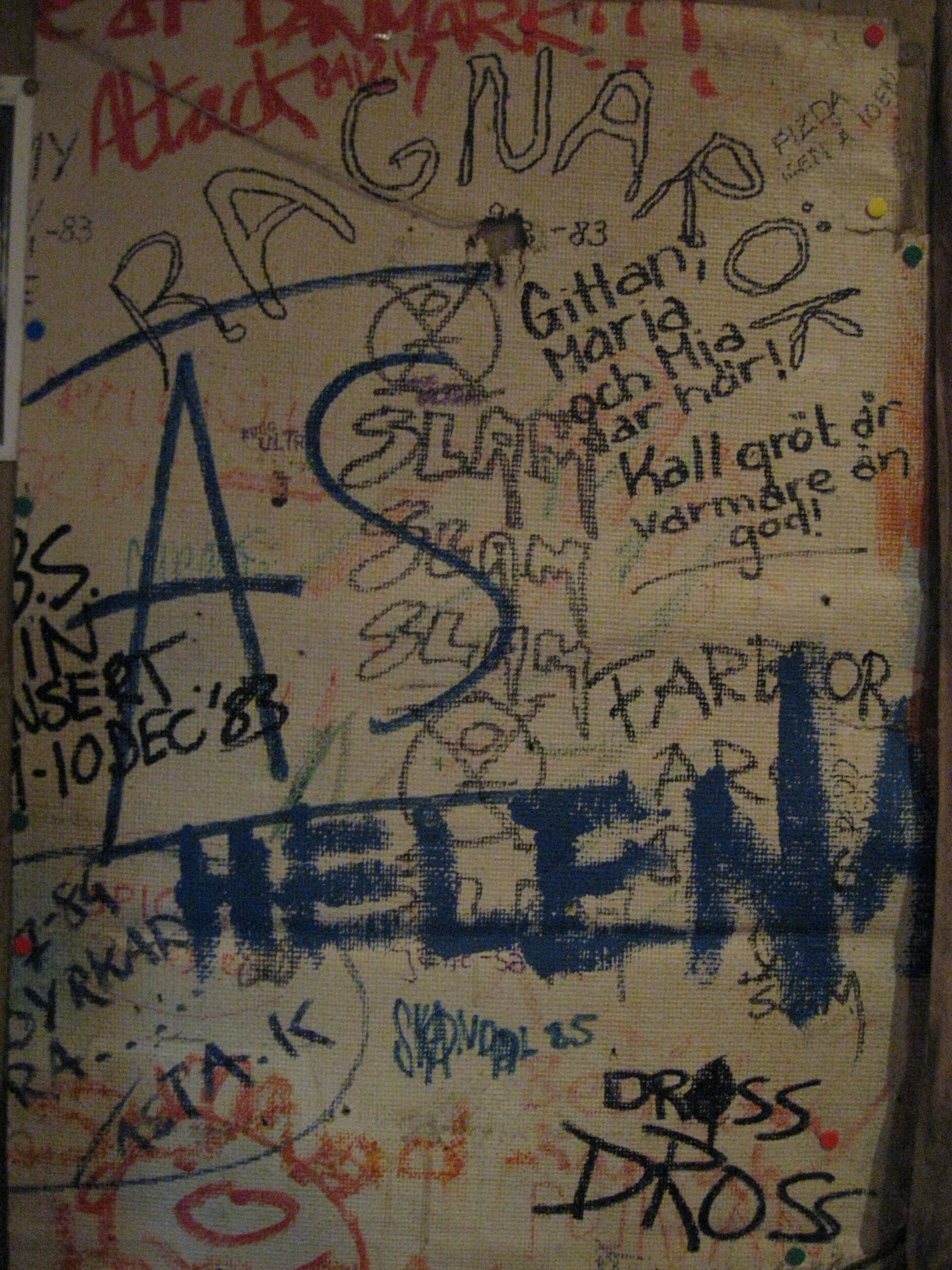
A piece of wallpaper from Ultrahuset.

Ultrahuset (literally "the Ultra house") was a punk music venue run by the Ultra cultural society in Haninge, between June 1980 and August 1988. During those years it was a central point in the young punk Stockholm.

The society was founded by young people in Handen, south of Stockholm in 1979. Initially, the club did not have its own space but were housed in public buildings during certain limited times. As they felt their own local was necessary for their activities they approached members of the municipality and demanded their own local. A year after the formation Ultra was given one of the many abandoned houses in Handen.

The house on the Källvägen 9 in the central Handen was now an activity house, the so-called Ultra house, where a variety of projects employing young people from the neighborhood took place. What makes the Ultra Hall is widely known, however, all the music concerts that were held there on weekends. Over the years there were thousands of concerts with nearly as many bands. The rumor about that little house with the very small stage in the living room, adjacent to the kitchen where bun were baked spread. It attracted people from all over Stockholm (or even further away) to make the trip to Handen on the weekends. The attendance record of a gig there was when Ebba Grön played there in 1981, there were 200 people there. Other bands that played there include KSMB, Black Flag (with Henry Rollins), Scream (with Dave Grohl, later known with Nirvana and Foo Fighters) and Det svider i stjärten (with Zak Tell, later known with Clawfinger) The most famous of the club enthusiasts was Tompa Eken.

In 1987 the municipality decided finally that the area would change and that the society thus had to move. After much protest and a time of occupation the house burnt down the night before August 20, 1988. The Ultra cultural society was offered other alternatives, but much of the original commitment had vanished and internal arguments resulted in a split where one party continued call themselves the Ultra and the other called itself RuggUltra. RuggUltra housed in a new site called Hunddagis, was about 45 square meters and existed for about five years.

== See also ==
- Kafé 44
