= Stars in the Sky =

Single by Kid Cudi
- Released: March 25, 2022
- Recorded: 2022
- Genre: Dance-pop
- Length: 3:05
- Label: Republic
- Songwriters: Brandon Benjamin; David Biral; Denzel Baptiste; Oladipo Omishore; Scott Mescudi; Montero Hill
- Producers: Splititupbenji; Take a Daytrip; Dot da Genius

Kid Cudi singles chronology
| "Want It Bad" (2022) | "Stars in the Sky" (2022) | "Talk About Me" (2022) |

Music video
- "Stars in the Sky" on YouTube

"Stars in the Sky" is a song by American musician Kid Cudi. Created for the film Sonic the Hedgehog 2 (2022), it was released as a single in promotion of both the film and its soundtrack on March 25, 2022, through Republic Records.The song was written by Cudi himself alongside Lil Nas X and producers Splititupbenji, Take a Daytrip, & Dot da Genius. The accompanying music video released on YouTube on the same day of the song's release and also received overall positive reviews.

== Background and release ==
Kid Cudi released a teaser for "Stars in the Sky" on his Twitter account on March 24. In addition to his announcement for the single, he also stated the intention to do a film screen with some of his followers.

"Stars in the Sky" was released by Republic Records at midnight on March 25, 2022; the song was available for pre-save on music streaming services the day prior. The song was written by Kid Cudi, Lil Nas X, Dot da Genius, and Take a Daytrip, with the latter two also behind the production with Splititupbenji. Chris Gehringer was behind the mastering of the song; audio mixing was done by Patrizio Pigliapoco and Ignacio Partales with Tyler Lindsay and Brad Lauchert as assistance mixers. The song was recorded by William J. Sullivan and Drew Sliger. It is three minutes and five seconds long. "Stars in the Sky" was created for the 2022 film Sonic the Hedgehog 2 and was also included in the film's soundtrack, playing during both the opening and ending credits. The cover art used for the song included references to the 1992 video game Sonic the Hedgehog 2.

On April 9, 2022, Cudi performed a medley of "Stars in the Sky" and "Pursuit of Happiness" at the Kids' Choice Awards for the first time.

== Reception ==
Aaron Williams of Uproxx wrote that the song seemingly contained elements of indie rock, Tom Breihan of Stereogum described it as a "bleepy, uptempo dance-pop track" while saying that it "definitely sounds like a song from a kids' movie." Breihan also said that it was a "pretty weird look for Kid Cudi" and believed that "maybe it'll be a hit". Jordan Rose of Complex noted that the song "captured the lighthearted and fast nature of Sonic 2", while Jessica McKinney from the same entertainment company said that "Stars in the Sky" found Kid Cudi "dancing over galactic production". Writing for ComicBook.com, Cade Onder described the song as a "banger" while also saying that it "fits well with the heart of Sonic the Hedgehog 2." Emily Zemler of Rolling Stone wrote that some of the song's lyrics referenced some of Kid Cudi's previous songs, including his 2008 and 2009 singles "Day 'n' Nite" and "Rollin'", respectively.

== Music video ==
The music video displays Kid Cudi recording the song in a recording studio, but he is interrupted by a message from Doctor Robotnik on his cell phone, who invites Cudi to join him. Cudi preemptively accepts and leaves the studio, where he finds a flying vehicle. He starts the vehicle and flies off at high speed while continuing to sing the song, in addition to the video clip showing footages (some hitherto unpublished) of Sonic the Hedgehog 2, both in its original filmage version and in a 16-bit recreation.

The musician teams up with Sonic and Tails to stop Robotnik, who is already in Green Hills, inside a giant robot resembling himself. Cudi also builds a mech that resembles himself and with one punch, destroys Robotnik's robot, and later celebrates with a fist bump with Tails and Sonic, who gives the musician one of his powered quills and opens a ring portal so Cudi can return to the recording studio.

The music video was also released the same day the song was on YouTube. In a review for the music video, Tom Skinner of NME said in regards to the music video that it contained "fun accompanying visuals that intersperse clips of Cudi performing in the studio with shots from the forthcoming movie", and some graphics from the 1991 game Sonic the Hedgehog. Christian Hodge of Screen Rant wrote that the music video was a "fun romp", but questioned whether it presented an excessive amount of the film's plot before its release.

== Personnel ==
Personnel derived from Apple Music:

- Kid Cudi – vocals, songwriter
- Lil Nas X – songwriter
- Dot da Genius – production, songwriter
- Take a Daytrip – production, songwriter
- Splititupbenji – production
- Chris Gehringer – mastering
- Patrizio Pigliapoco – mixing
- Igancio Partales – mixing
- Tyler Lindsay – assistant mixing
- Brad Lauchert – assistant mixing
- William J. Sullivan – recording
- Drew Sliger – recording
