= Willis Eken =

American politician (1931–2010)

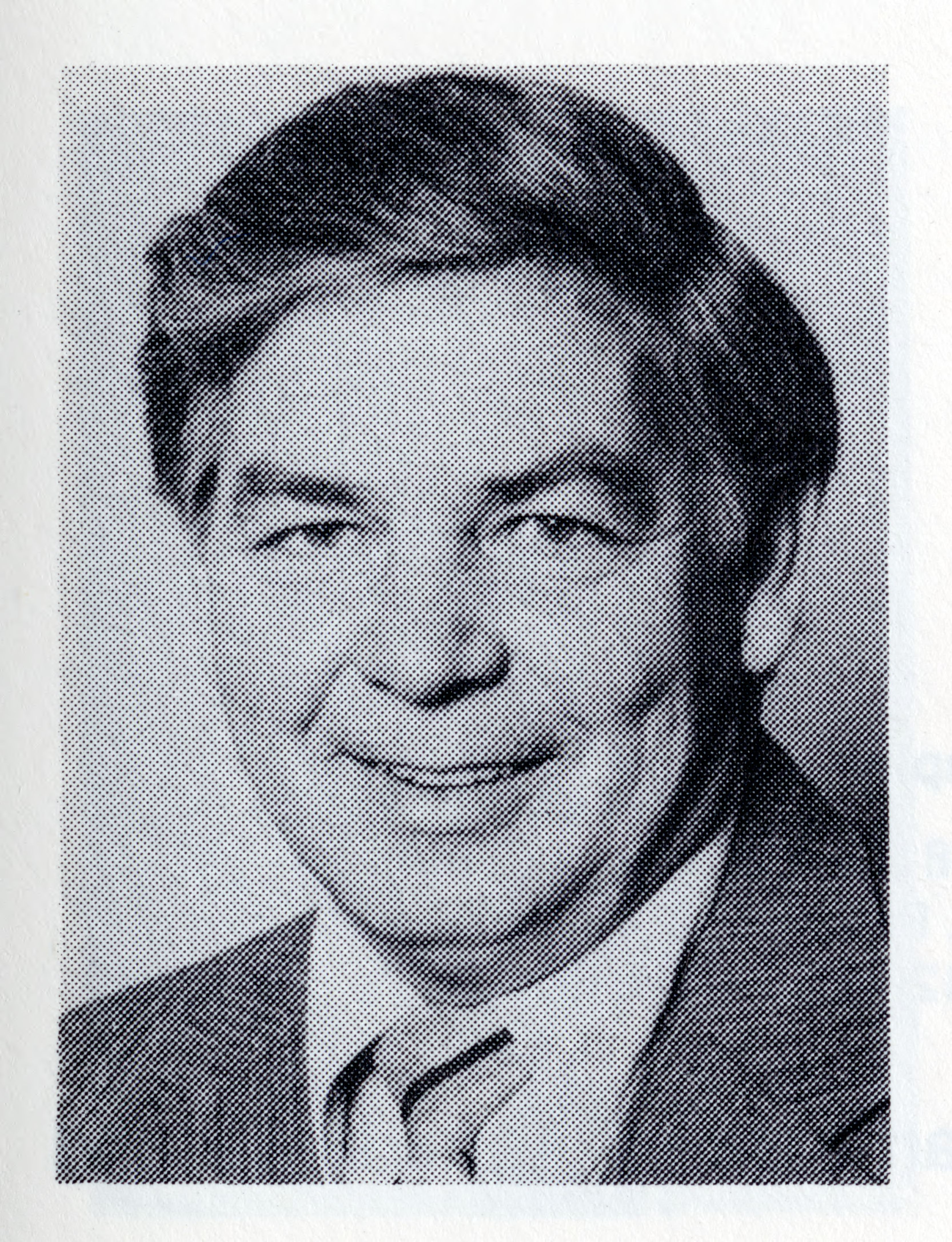
- Eken c. 1981

Member of the Minnesota House of Representatives from the 2B district
- In office January 1, 1973 – August 1, 1984

Member of the Minnesota House of Representatives from the 66A district
- In office January 4, 1971 – December 31, 1972

Personal details
- Born: Willis Roy Eken; April 12, 1931 Ada, Minnesota, U.S.
- Died: May 8, 2010 (aged 79) Twin Valley, Minnesota, U.S.
- Party: Democratic (DFL)
- Children: 4, including Kent Eken
- Occupation: Politician, farmer

Willis Roy Eken (April 12, 1931 – May 8, 2010) was an American politician and farmer.

Born in Ada, Minnesota, Eken graduated from Twin Valley High School in Twin Valley, Minnesota, and was a farmer. He served as President of the Minnesota Farmers Union. Eken served in the Minnesota House of Representatives, as a Democrat, from 1971 to 1984. His son Kent Eken also served in the Minnesota State Legislature. Eken died in Twin Valley, Minnesota.
