= Sonic the Hedgehog 2 (soundtrack) =

Sonic the Hedgehog 2: Music from the Motion Picture

Film score by Tom Holkenborg
- Released: April 8, 2022
- Recorded: 2021–2022
- Genre: Film score
- Label: Paramount Music
- Producer: Tom Holkenborg

Tom Holkenborg chronology
The 355 (2022)	Sonic the Hedgehog 2 (2022)	Three Thousand Years of Longing (2022)

Sonic the Hedgehog 2: Music from the Motion Picture is the score album for the 2022 film of the same name. The score, which was composed by Tom Holkenborg, was released on April 8, 2022, by Paramount Music in both digital and physical formats.

== Background and release ==
In December 2021, MARlowe who also composed Sonic the Hedgehog (2020), was announced to be returning to compose the score of its sequel, Sonic the Hedgehog 2. The film was supported by a single titled "Stars in the Sky", the only original song recorded for the film, by Kid Cudi. The soundtrack was released on digital platforms by Paramount Music on April 8, 2022, the same day as the film's United States release. La-La Land Records also released a limited edition CD of the album in April 2022, and Enjoy the Ride Records released a limited edition cassette tape in August 2022.

== Reception ==
Calling it as a highly enjoyable orchestral ride from start to finish, Zanobard Reviews assigned a 7 out of 10 rating and wrote "Though the orchestral style featured throughout Sonic 2 is still very entertaining, with the way it utilises both established and brand new themes as well as both elevating the tension and enjoyability throughout its many edge-of-your-seat action setpieces being pretty sublime. In essence then; while not perfect, it's another solid score from Holkenborg." Roberto Nieves of Marooners' Rock thought the score was strong overall, though he criticized it for not incorporating music from the Sonic games.

Michael Guterres of Comic Book Resources called the scores from both the film and its predecessor "forgettable and unremarkable" stating that they paled in comparison to the music and melodies from the games as well as Holkenborg's prior work. Christian Clemmensen of Filmtracks gave the album a 2 out of 5 star rating, criticizing the score for sounding cheap and generic, and for being weaker than that of the first film. He concluded his review by stating, "A 57-minute score-only album contains none of the outright parody music or songs, and listeners will note that no single cue embodies the enthusiasm and attraction of the suite that concluded the prior score's album."

== Track listing ==
All music is composed by Tom Holkenborg.

No.	Title	Length
1.	"Piece of Shiitake Planet"	2:52
2.	"Blue Menace"	2:28
3.	"Mind If I Drive"	2:06
4.	"Sonic's Home"	1:18
5.	"A Wachowski Family Special"	3:15
6.	"Sonic, Meet Knuckles"	2:48
7.	"Papa's Got a Brand New Stache"	1:53
8.	"The Master Emerald"	2:40
9.	"So You Think You Can Pivonka"	2:14
10.	"Goodnight, Tails"	2:09
11.	"Ages Ago"	2:50
12.	"You Know Nothing About Me"	2:54
13.	"Operation Catfish"	3:34
14.	"Eureka, I Found It"	2:45
15.	"Gotta Go Fast"	1:46
16.	"Entering the Labyrinth"	1:59
17.	"You Don't Have to Be Alone Anymore"	3:10
18.	"Sinister"	3:37
19.	"Team vs Robotnik"	3:36
20.	"Okay, We're Not Friends"	3:38
21.	"A New Order"	2:51
22.	"Dad"	1:02
Total length:		57:33

== Additional music ==
The film was supported by a single titled "Stars in the Sky" by American musician Kid Cudi, which is featured during one of the opening scenes and in the end credits sequence. In April 2022, it was announced that "Up on the Green Hill from Sonic the Hedgehog Green Hill Zone - Masado and Miwasco Version -" by Dreams Come True would be used as the main theme song for the film's release in Japan. The song is the English version of the band's 2021 single "Tsugi no Se~no! De - On the Green Hill -," a vocal version of the theme music of Green Hill Zone from the original game.

Other songs featured in the film, but not on the soundtrack, include:

- "It's Tricky" by Run-DMC
- "1812 Overture, Op. 49" by Pyotr Tchaikovsky
- "Here Comes the Hotstepper" by Ini Kamoze
- "This Is How We Do It" by Montell Jordan
- "Hapa Haole" by Porouchi Nawohi
- "Don't Know Why" by Norah Jones
- "Me and You" by Rich White
- "Living on the Road" by Federico Rapagnetta, Giuseppe Santamaria, Duilio Sorrenti and Enrico Cosimi
- "Severny Kozachok" by Vyvyon John Ekkel
- "Russian Dance 1" by Lee Blaske, Darren Drew, and Brian Reidinger
- "Uptown Funk" by Mark Ronson featuring Bruno Mars
- "A Summer Place" by Andy Williams
- "Aloha Pachelbel" by Drew Lerda
- "Barracuda" by Heart
- "You Know How We Do It" by Ice Cube
- "I Shrink, Therefore I Am" from Ant-Man and the Wasp, composed by Christophe Beck
- "Walk" by Pantera
- "The Final Game / Take Me Out to the Ball Game" from The Natural, composed by Randy Newman

== See also ==
- Music of Sonic the Hedgehog
