= Knuckles (soundtrack) =

Knuckles: Music from the Paramount+ Original Series

Soundtrack album by Tom Howe
- Released: April 26, 2024
- Studios: AIR Lyndhurst Studios; Abbey Road Studios
- Genre: Score
- Label: Sony Classical
- Producer: Tom Howe

Tom Howe chronology
Rally Road Racers (2023)	Knuckles (2024)	Dog Man (2025)

Knuckles: Music from the Paramount+ Original Series is the soundtrack album to the 2024 television miniseries, Knuckles. The album features the original score composed by Tom Howe as well as two original songs, "Frickin' Human Race" performed by Asa Taccone, and "The Flames of Disaster" performed by Taccone, Julian Barratt, and Michael Bolton. It was released by Sony Classical Records on April 26, 2024, the same day as the series.

== Background ==
In place of Tom Holkenborg, who composed for the Sonic films, Tom Howe had been assigned to compose the music for the Knuckles. Howe started work by creating thematic ideas for the characters and put Knuckles in particular in mind when crafting the whole score. Idris Elba's voice as Knuckles helped when making the music, with Howe describing it as "fantastic, with a sort of gravitas". He described Knuckles entire character as superheroic but with a comedic element. The series' range in tone and scale meant that the score had to reflect that flexibility. In addition, he got to work with a range of different instruments and styles on the score, though he still aimed to make all the music cohesive with one another.

Howe described composing the score as more chaotic than his regular work due to the animated element that is Knuckles. The composer would get an early picture of a scene and, with the collaboration of the filmmakers, would come up with a piece to back it. After visual effects are added in, the scene could be shorter, longer, or different in general, meaning he had to go back and make changes to accommodate it. Four of the six episodes' orchestral scores were recorded at Abbey Road Studios in London, England, while the remaining two were recorded at AIR Lyndhurst Studios, also in London.

The series features two original songs: "Frickin' Human Race" performed by Asa Taccone and "The Flames of Disaster" performed by Taccone, Julian Barratt, and Michael Bolton. In the fourth episode of the series, Wade's dream sequence turns into a rock opera, in which the character adopts the singing voice of Bolton. Bolton was brought on to the production by the episode's director, Jorma Taccone, who shared a relationship with the singer after his band, The Lonely Island, collaborated with him on the Saturday Night Live sketch and song, "Jack Sparrow" (2011).

== Release and reception ==
A soundtrack album for the series was released on April 26, 2024 by Sony Classical Records. Connor Terell of CultureSlate said, "Tom Howe’s score is fittingly cinematic and perfectly fits each scene". He levied special praise towards the original song, "Flames of Disaster", in due part to Barratt and Bolton's vocals. Hugh Verheylewegen of Pixelated Geek referred to Howe’s score as "decent", and Cameron Frew of Dexerto called "Flames of Disaster" "an admirable, entertaining swing".

== Track listing ==
All music is composed by Tom Howe, except where noted.

Knuckles (Music from the Paramount+ Original Series)
No.	Title	Performer(s)	Length
1.	"Knuckles Suite"		6:09
2.	"I Made Myself at Home"		1:07
3.	"Under Attack"		3:26
4.	"Grounded Knuckles"		2:06
5.	"Gun HQ"		2:46
6.	"Wade's Dad"		2:23
7.	"Quite Nice Actually"		2:38
8.	"Ride Me"		1:32
9.	"Knuckles Inspires Wade"		2:11
10.	"Penthouse Fight"		1:54
11.	"Rooftop Chat"		1:14
12.	"Bounty Hunters"		3:42
13.	"Shabbat Dinner"		1:01
14.	"Rules of Bounty Hunting"		1:37
15.	"Heart to Heart"		2:01
16.	"The Joust"		2:34
17.	"Wade Escapes"		1:39
18.	"Pete's Penthouse"		1:53
19.	"Argument Continues"		2:15
20.	"The Workshop"		4:56
21.	"Wade Betrays Knuckles"		1:48
22.	"The Buyer Arrives"		3:08
23.	"Bowling Battle"		3:30
24.	"Best Shabbat Ever"		0:50
25.	"Wade's Monologue"		1:10
26.	"The Final Battle"		4:50
27.	"Knuckles Credits"		0:52
28.	"Frickin' Human Race"	Asa Taccone	0:49
29.	"Flames of Disaster"	Julian Barratt & Asa Taccone (ft. Michael Bolton)	5:41
Total length:			1:11:06

== Additional music ==
"The Warrior" by Scandal appears as the series' opening theme. The following additional licensed songs are featured in the series:

- "Our House" – Madness
- "Green Onions" – Booker T. & the M.G.'s
- "Belly Dancer (Bananza)" – Imanbek & BYOR
- "Keep Movin' On" – MYLK
- "Can I Kick It?" – A Tribe Called Quest
- "Non, je ne regrette rien" – Édith Piaf
- "Holding Out for a Hero" – Bonnie Tyler
- "I Don't Want to Wait" – Paula Cole
- "Rock You Like a Hurricane" – Scorpions
- "I'm So Lonesome I Could Cry" – Hank Williams
- "All the Small Things" – Blink-182
- "Oh, Pretty Woman" – Roy Orbison
- "Hava Nagila" – Barry & Batya Segal
- "Good Morning" – Judy Garland and Mickey Rooney
- "Send Me An Angel" – Real Life
- "Damn It Feels Good to Be a Gangsta" – Geto Boys
- "Let Me Entertain You" – Robbie Williams
- "Scarface (Push It to the Limit)" – Paul Engemann
- "The Story of My Old Man" – Good Charlotte
- "Saturday Night's Alright (For Fighting)" – Elton John
- "Sirius" – Borna Matosic
- "Pick Up the Pieces" – Average White Band
- "Guardians at Heaven's Gate" – Bloodbound
- "Whatta Man" – Salt-N-Pepa and En Vogue

== See also ==
- Music of Sonic the Hedgehog
