= ULTRA (UK agency) =

Defunct UK agency that regulated organ transplants

ULTRA, the Unrelated Live Transplant Regulatory Authority, was a British agency that regulated organ transplants. According to the official website:

The Human Organ Transplants Act 1989 ("the HOT Act") forbids payment for organs and places considerable restrictions on transplants between living persons... ULTRA was established to consider applications made by registered medical practitioners seeking approval to transplant an organ between two living unrelated persons in the UK and to establish that the conditions set out in the Regulations governing transplants between living genetically unrelated persons, are satisfied. Specifically ULTRA examines each case to determine whether there is evidence or suggestion of payment for organs or of inducement, coercion or pressure to donate.

In September 2006, ULTRA disbanded. Its functions were transferred to the Human Tissue Authority, a non-departmental public body of the Department of Health.
