= Sonic the Hedgehog 2 (film) =

2022 film by Jeff Fowler

- Theatrical release poster
- Directed by: Jeff Fowler
- Screenplay by: Pat Casey; Josh Miller; John Whittington
- Story by: Pat Casey; Josh Miller
- Based on: Sonic the Hedgehog by Sega (Note: Sonic the Hedgehog was developed by Sonic Team, published by Sega, directed and programmed by Yuji Naka, designed by Hirokazu Yasuhara, and illustrated by Naoto Ohshima.)
- Produced by: Neal H. Moritz; Toby Ascher; Toru Nakahara; Hitoshi Okuno
- Starring: James Marsden; Ben Schwartz; Tika Sumpter; Natasha Rothwell; Adam Pally; Shemar Moore; Colleen O'Shaughnessey; Idris Elba; Jim Carrey
- Cinematography: Brandon Trost
- Edited by: Jim May
- Music by: Tom Holkenborg
- Production companies: Original Film; Marza Animation Planet; Blur Studio
- Distributed by: Paramount Pictures
- Release dates: March 30, 2022 (International); April 8, 2022 (United States); August 19, 2022 (Japan)
- Running time: 122 minutes
- Countries: United States; Japan
- Language: English
- Budget: $90–110 million
- Box office: $405.4 million

Sonic the Hedgehog 2 (Note: Known in Japan as Sonic the Movie / Sonic vs. Knuckles (Japanese: ソニック・ザ・ムービー／ソニック VS ナックルズ, Hepburn: Sonikku za Mūbī / Sonikku VS Nakkuruzu)) is a 2022 action-adventure comedy film based on the Sonic video game series. It is the second installment in the Sonic film series, it was directed by Jeff Fowler from a screenplay by Pat Casey, Josh Miller, and John Whittington. Ben Schwartz, Jim Carrey, James Marsden, Tika Sumpter, Natasha Rothwell, Colleen O'Shaughnessey and Adam Pally reprise their roles, with Shemar Moore and Idris Elba joining the cast. In the film, Sonic and his friend Tails (O'Shaughnessey) embark on a journey to find the Master Emerald before their nemesis, Dr. Robotnik, and his accomplice, Knuckles the Echidna (Elba).

Following the success of Sonic the Hedgehog (2020), Paramount Pictures announced the sequel in May 2020, with Fowler, Casey, Miller and the cast returning. Filming took place from March to June 2021 in Vancouver and Hawaii. The film was inspired by the video games Sonic the Hedgehog 2 (1992), Sonic the Hedgehog 3 (1994), and Sonic & Knuckles (1994).

Sonic the Hedgehog 2 was theatrically released in several markets on March 30, 2022, in the United States on April 8, and in Japan on August 19. Like its predecessor, it set several box office records for a video game film and received positive reviews from critics. It grossed $405.4 million worldwide. Sonic the Hedgehog 3 and the television spin-off Knuckles were released in 2024, while Sonic the Hedgehog 4 will be released in 2027.

== Plot ==
Eight months after defeating and banishing his nemesis Dr. Robotnik to the Mushroom Planet, (Note: As depicted at the end of Sonic the Hedgehog (2020)) Sonic lives with the Wachowskis and attempts to help the public as a vigilante hero with little success due to his recklessness. While on a fishing trip, Tom advises Sonic to remain patient for the day his powers will be needed. He and Maddie depart for her sister Rachel's wedding in Hawaii, leaving Sonic in charge of the house for the weekend.

While staying at home that night, Sonic is ambushed by Robotnik, who has escaped from the mushroom planet and Knuckles, an echidna warrior who is his newest henchman. Knuckles demands the location of the legendary Master Emerald—an ancient relic that grants the user's ultimate power and the ability to change reality to their will—so he can bring honor to his ancestors. Sonic is rescued by Miles "Tails" Prower, a young two-tailed fox who idolizes him and has come to warn him about Knuckles.

Sonic convinces Tails to help him find the Master Emerald while Robotnik reunites with his assistant, Agent Stone, and forms an alliance with Knuckles, scheming to steal the emerald. Following clues on a map given to Sonic by his late former guardian, Longclaw, Sonic and Tails find a compass within a temple in Siberia. Knuckles and Robotnik track them and chase Sonic and Tails down a mountain. Knuckles reveals that he lost his whole tribe the same day Sonic lost Longclaw. Despite this brief moment of sympathy, Knuckles and Robotnik steal the compass. However, Knuckles grows suspicious of Robotnik's sense of loyalty and honor when he mocks Sonic for choosing to save an injured and unconscious Tails instead of the compass before an avalanche starts upon them.

Tom saves Sonic and Tails from an avalanche by using a ring to teleport them to the wedding. Rachel's fiancé Randall and his wedding guests reveal themselves as undercover agents of the Guardian Units of Nations (G.U.N.), having set the wedding up to capture Sonic and Tails; they also arrest Tom when he tries to stop them. The trio are saved by Maddie and a vengeful Rachel, who reconciles with Randall after he confirms that his feelings for her are genuine. Meanwhile, Knuckles and Robotnik find an underwater temple containing the Master Emerald.

Blaming himself for Tails' injuries, Sonic decides to face Knuckles and Robotnik alone and goes to the temple, where he fights Knuckles to keep him from taking the Master Emerald. Robotnik exploits the distraction and seizes the emerald, causing the temple to collapse which it sinks into the water after Robotnik revealed his betrayal to Knuckles and leaves both him and Sonic to drown. Teaming up after rescuing one another from the flood, Sonic and Knuckles manage to escape just as a recovered Tails rescues them in a biplane.

In Green Hills, Robotnik uses his new abilities from the emerald to create a giant robot resembling himself. Sonic, Tails, and Knuckles work together to fight the robot and its accompanying drones and reclaim the Master Emerald. The emerald shatters in Sonic's hands, splitting into the seven Chaos Emeralds. Tom and Maddie save Sonic, who inadvertently uses the Chaos Emeralds to transform into Super Sonic. He fights and destroys the robot, allowing Robotnik to collapse with it, before dispersing the Emeralds and reverting to normal. Knuckles fixes the Master Emerald from the remaining shards before making a pact with Sonic and Tails to protect it from evil together, and they start an idyllic life with the Wachowskis.

While G.U.N. searches for Robotnik, Stone poses as a soldier to avoid capture. He overhears Commander Walters receiving information about the discovery of a secret research facility, which Walters immediately recognizes as the one housing Project Shadow.

== Cast ==
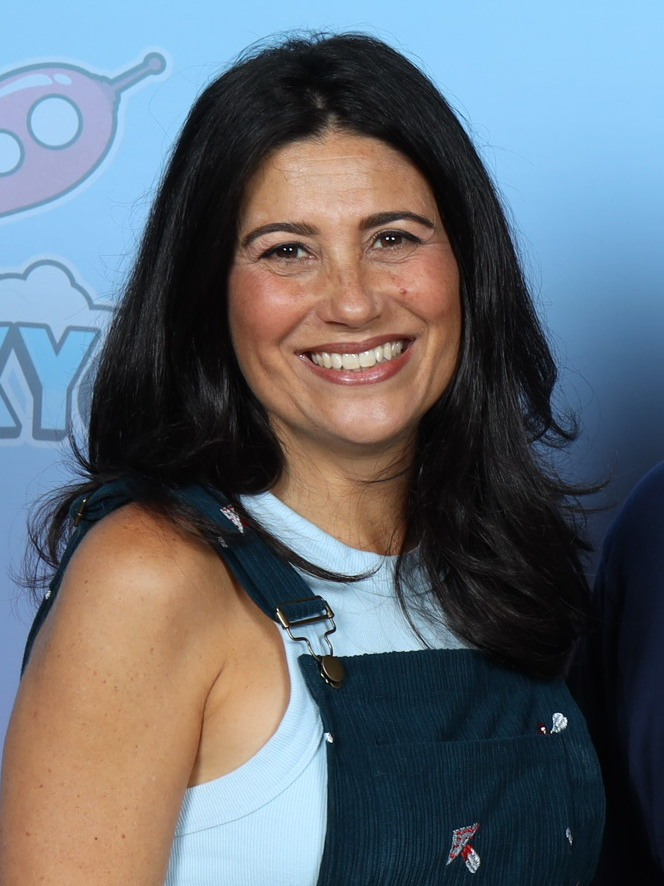
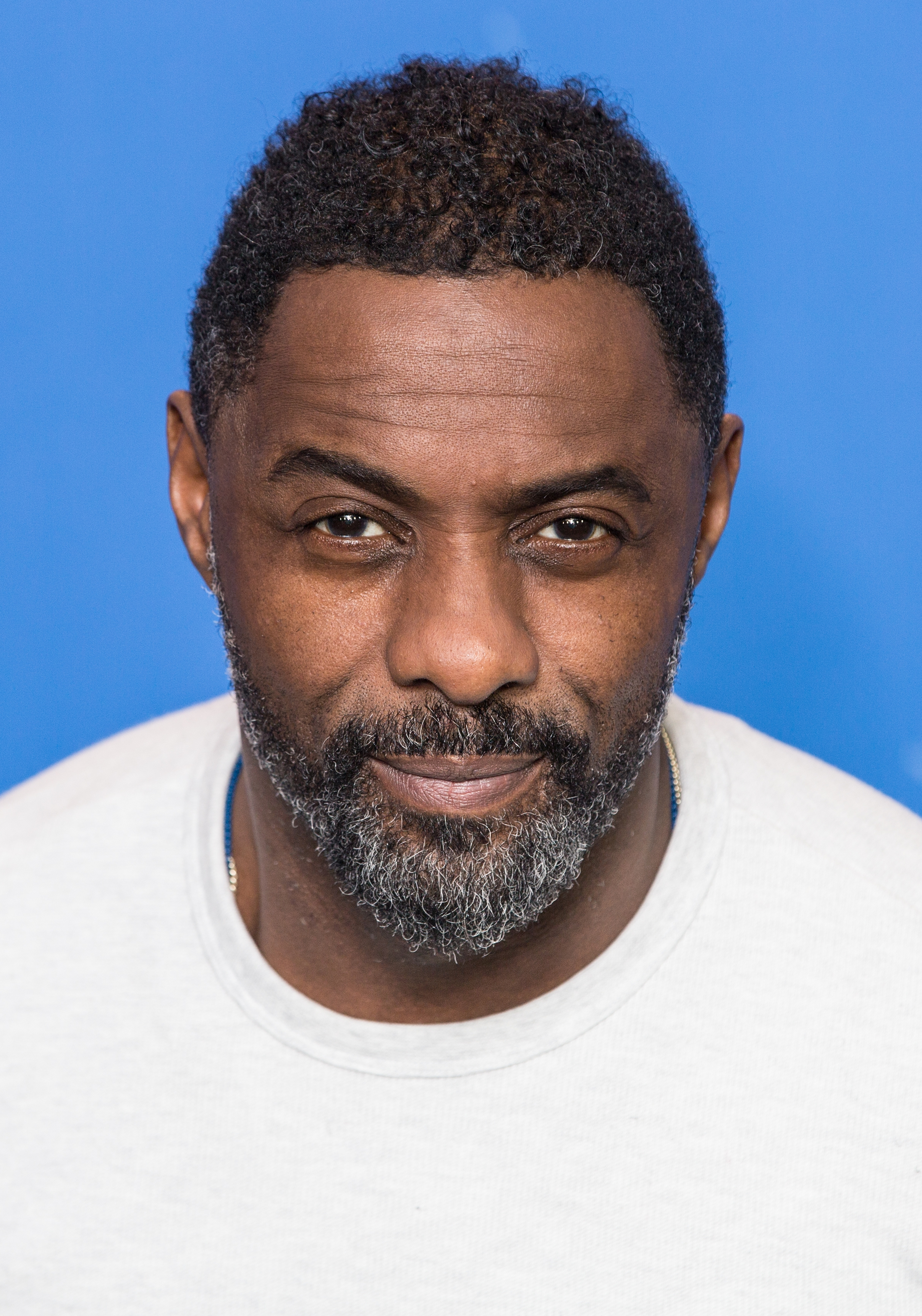
Colleen O'Shaughnessey reprises her role after voicing Miles "Tails" Prower in the previous film's post-credits scene, and Idris Elba is newly cast as the voice of Knuckles the Echidna.

=== Voice ===
- Ben Schwartz as Sonic the Hedgehog, an anthropomorphic blue hedgehog with superhuman speed
  - Archival recordings of Benjamin L. Valic as young Sonic are used during flashbacks.
- Colleen O'Shaughnessey as Miles "Tails" Prower, an anthropomorphic fox who can fly with his twin-tails. O'Shaughnessey is the only voice cast member from the Sonic the Hedgehog video games to reprise her role for the film.
- Idris Elba as Knuckles the Echidna, an anthropomorphic echidna warrior with super strength who allies himself with Robotnik in search of the Master Emerald. Elba prepared for the role by exploring the character's backstory and identity. Director Jeff Fowler wanted the film's portrayal of Knuckles to be reminiscent of his early appearances, and said "his entire existence is about honor and about being a warrior", describing him as "a force of nature".
- Donna J. Fulks as Longclaw, an anthropomorphic owl, Sonic's late caregiver, and the former guardian of the Master Emerald

=== Live-action ===
- Jim Carrey as Doctor Robotnik, a mad scientist and Sonic's arch-nemesis who he often refers to as "Eggman"
- James Marsden as Tom Wachowski, the sheriff of Green Hills, Montana, and Sonic's father figure
- Tika Sumpter as Maddie Wachowski, Tom's wife, the local veterinarian of Green Hills, and Sonic's mother figure
- Natasha Rothwell as Rachel, Maddie's older sister, who dislikes Tom
- Adam Pally as Wade Whipple, a deputy sheriff of Green Hills and Tom's friend
- Lee Majdoub as Agent Stone, an ex-government agent and Robotnik's assistant
- Tom Butler as Commander Walters, the Vice Chairman of the Joint Chiefs of Staff who is now the leader of the military organization Guardian Units of Nations (G.U.N.)
- Shemar Moore as Randall Handel, Rachel's fiancé who is a G.U.N. agent
- Melody Nosipho Niemann as Jojo, Rachel's daughter and Tom and Maddie's niece

== Production ==
=== Development ===
In April 2020, James Marsden expressed interest in a sequel to Sonic the Hedgehog (2020) featuring several characters from the video games, including Tails, who appeared in a mid-credits scene in the first film. Jeff Fowler expressed interest in developing a sequel that focused on Sonic and Tails' friendship and developed Dr. Robotnik. Later that month, Ben Schwartz said that he felt it made sense for Paramount Pictures not to have announced a sequel by that point due to the COVID-19 pandemic, adding that he was interested in a sequel featuring Tails and a more game-accurate portrayal of Robotnik.

In May, Paramount Pictures confirmed that a sequel to Sonic the Hedgehog was in development, with Fowler set to return as director alongside writers Pat Casey and Josh Miller. Neal H. Mortiz, Toby Ascher and Toru Nakahara will produce the sequel, having previously co-produced the first film alongside Takeshi Ito, while Tim Miller, Hajime Satomi and Haruki Satomi will return from the first film as executive producers.

In December, it was confirmed by storyboard artist Fill Marc that artist Tyson Hesse, who redesigned Sonic for the first film, would be returning. The film title was announced as Sonic the Hedgehog 2 in February 2021. In May, a synopsis of the story was released as Paramount submitted a copyright registration to the U.S. Copyright Office catalog.

The film is inspired by the video games Sonic the Hedgehog 2 (1992), Sonic the Hedgehog 3, and Sonic & Knuckles (both 1994), but is not a direct adaptation of either. Fowler described the film as "a melting pot" of ideas from several Sonic games.

=== Casting ===
On January 27, 2020, Jim Carrey said his character, the villain Dr. Robotnik, could be expanded in the sequel: "I wouldn't mind going to do another one because it was so much fun, first of all, and a real challenge to convince people that I have a triple-digit IQ... There is so much room, you know, Robotnik has not reached his apotheosis."

On March 6, Marsden confirmed that he had signed on for multiple sequels. The rest of the returning cast, including Carrey, was confirmed throughout 2021. In February 2021, it was reported that Jason Momoa was being considered for the role of Knuckles the Echidna. On June 16, it was announced that Shemar Moore had joined the cast; it was later confirmed that he would play Randall, Rachel's fiancé. On August 10, it was announced that Idris Elba would play Knuckles the Echidna. For the film's Japanese dub, the Hololive Production-affiliated VTuber Inugami Korone, who also serves as the Japanese brand ambassador of the Sonic series, voiced a character. Shadow the Hedgehog made his live action debut in a non-speaking cameo in the mid-credits scene, which was meant to tease a larger role in future films.

=== Filming ===
In December 2020, it was reported that the BC Film Commission had listed that the production of the film would occur from March 15 to May 10, 2021, under the working title Emerald Hill, a reference to the opening zone in the Sonic the Hedgehog 2 video game. In January 2021, Tika Sumpter revealed that the film would shoot in both Vancouver and Hawaii.

Principal photography began in Vancouver on March 15, 2021, with Brandon Trost serving as cinematographer. As a way to show his gratitude to the crew, Carrey held a raffle on May 7 in order to give away a Chevrolet Blazer; the car was eventually given to a grip. Filming in Vancouver concluded on May 12. Filming wrapped in Hawaii on June 25.

=== Visual effects and animation ===
Visual effects and animation for Sonic the Hedgehog 2 was provided by Sega's Marza Animation Planet and Moving Picture Company (MPC), after previously working on the first film. John Whittington was announced as co-screenwriter on August 10, 2021. Additionally, DNEG also provided the visual effects for the mushroom planet and the cockpit of the robot, giving it a total of 185 shots used in the film from the studio. Additional visual effects services was provided by Animism Studios, Fish Flight Entertainment, Fatbelly VFX, Unit Motion Design, and Track VFX. Unlisted Studio produced the animation for the backstory of the Master Emerald.

== Music ==
On December 8, 2021, Tom Holkenborg, who also composed the first film, was announced to be returning to compose the film's score. The film was supported by a single titled "Stars in the Sky", the only original song recorded for the film, by Kid Cudi. The soundtrack album was released by Paramount Music on April 8, 2022.

In addition, the Japanese-dubbed version includes an arrangement of the theme for Green Hill Zone titled "UP ON THE GREEN HILL from Sonic the Hedgehog Green Hill Zone". It was performed by the group Dreams Come True, which features Masato Nakamura, the composer of the original Sonic the Hedgehog video game.

== Release ==
=== Theatrical ===
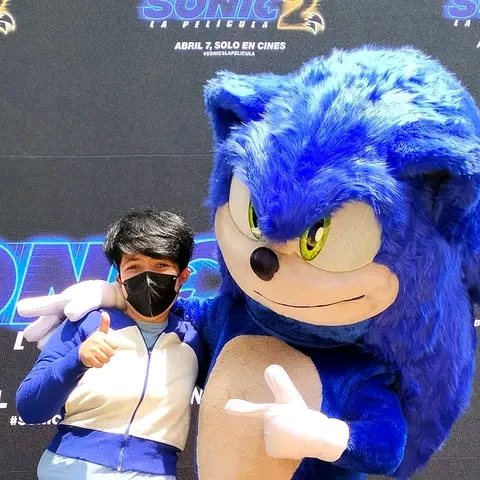
A Sonic the Hedgehog mascot posing next to a fan at the premiere of the film

On March 1, 2022, Paramount announced it would be postponing the film's Russian release, originally scheduled for March 31, until further notice in response to the Russian invasion of Ukraine. On March 14, when tickets went on sale for the United States, an early access screening dubbed a "Fan Event" was announced for April 6.

Sonic the Hedgehog 2 was first theatrically released by Paramount Pictures in several international markets, including France, Philippines and the Netherlands on March 30, 2022 and the United Kingdom on April 1, 2022. The film held its world premiere at the Regency Village Theatre in Los Angeles on April 5, 2022, and was theatrically released in the United States on April 8, 2022.

=== Marketing ===
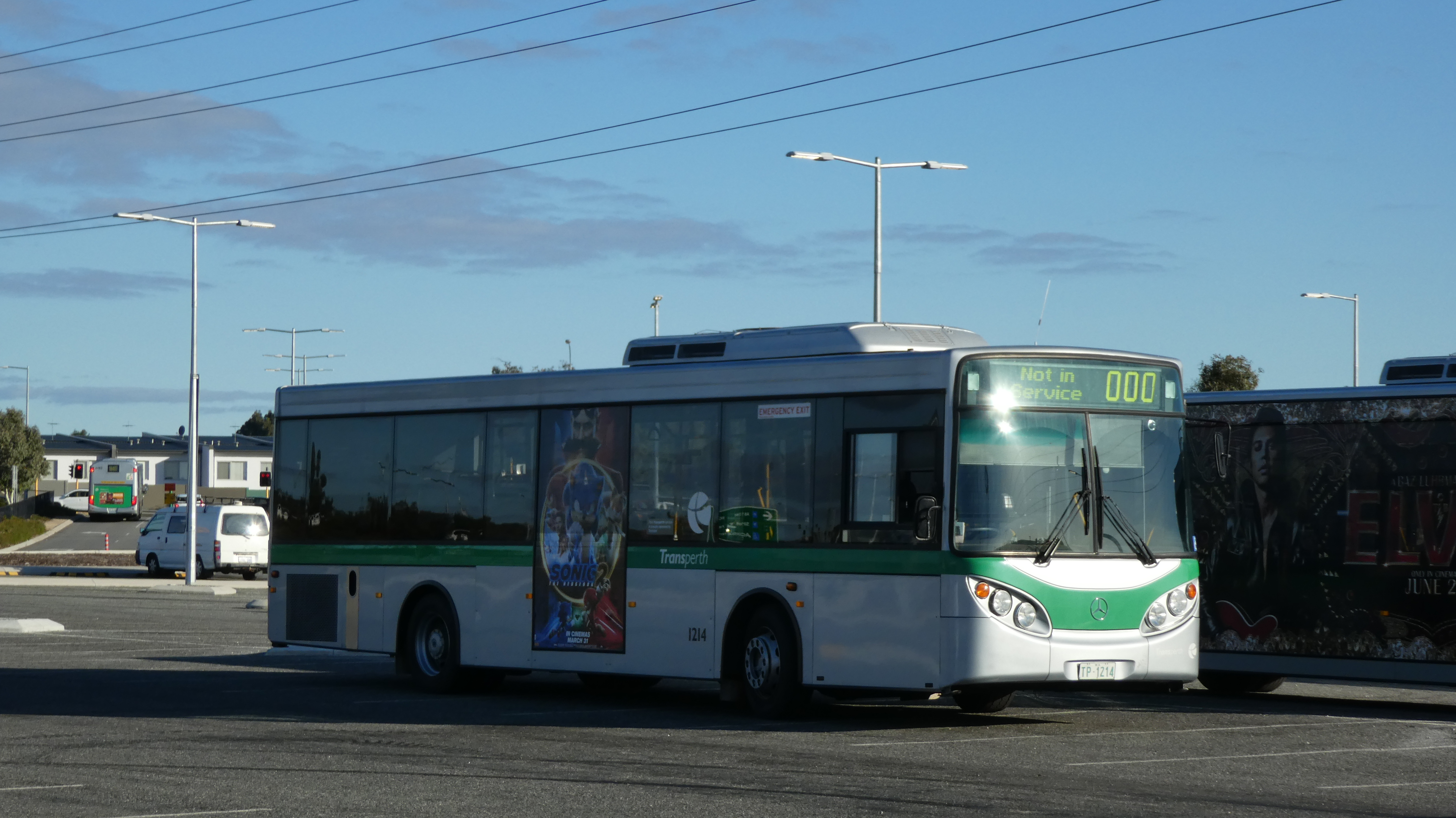
A poster of the film advertised on the side of a Transperth bus

The teaser poster was revealed on December 8, 2021. The next day, the first trailer was released at The Game Awards 2021. The trailer includes a reworked version of Masato Nakamura's "Emerald Hill Zone" music from the original Sonic the Hedgehog 2 video game. Fans reacted very positively, with Elba as Knuckles attracting particular praise. Reviewers noted the difference in reaction compared to the first film's initial trailer which was released on April 30, 2019.

During the week before Super Bowl LVI, Paramount released four TV spots showcasing new footage and the reveal of the Giant Eggman Robot. A special TV spot aired during Super Bowl LVI on February 13, 2022. The theatrical release poster excluded O'Shaughnessey's name, leading to fan outcry. Updated posters, released shortly thereafter, included her name as well as Sumpter's on the upper billing block. The second and final trailer was released on March 14, 2022. Another poster was also revealed, resembling the North American box art for the original Sonic the Hedgehog 2 video game.

Paramount spent less than $18 million on television spots promoting the film in the U.S., which generated 717 million impressions. On March 29, 2022, King partnered with Sega and Paramount to help create a special edition of the online game Candy Crush Saga in ways to promote the film. The Mill helped do the visuals for the Happy Meal advertisements.

=== Home media ===
Sonic the Hedgehog 2 was released for download and streaming on Paramount+ on May 24, 2022. The same day, EPIX added the film to their library following Paramount's pay-one-window deal with the service. It released on DVD, Blu-ray, and Ultra HD Blu-ray on August 9, 2022. Like its predecessor, the digital and Blu-ray releases come with an exclusive short film, Sonic Drone Home, fully animated by Marza Animation Planet and written by Pat Casey and Josh Miller, while directed by David Nelson and produced by Neal H. Moritz, Toby Ascher, Toru Nakahara and Hitoshi Okuno. The short film features Sonic, Tails, and Knuckles facing off against one of Robotnik's drones in Green Hills' scrapyard. Schwartz reprises his role as Sonic, while Tails, Knuckles, and the drone named Unit are voiced by Alicyn Packard (replacing O'Shaughnessey), Fred Tatasciore (replacing Elba), and Aaron Landon respectively.

== Reception ==
=== Box office ===
Sonic the Hedgehog 2 grossed $190.9 million in the United States and Canada, and $214.5 million in other territories, for a worldwide total of $405.4 million.

In the US and Canada, it was released alongside Ambulance and the wide expansion of Everything Everywhere All at Once. Several days before release, it was projected to gross at least $55 million from 4,232 theatres in its opening weekend. With its target audience aged between 16 and 25, its release coincided with the start of spring break in 15% of K–12 schools. The film made $26.8 million on its first day, including $6.25 million from Thursday night previews, doubling that of the original movie. The film went on to gross $72.1 million over its three-day opening weekend, surpassing the original film's three-day opening ($58 million) and Bruce Almighty ($68 million) to become Jim Carrey's highest three-day domestic opening and Paramount's biggest three-day opening since 2014. Six million tickets were sold in the U.S. and Canada during its opening weekend. It broke the opening record for a video game movie adaptation, which was previously held by the original Sonic the Hedgehog and was surpassed a year later by The Super Mario Bros. Movie ($146.4 million).

Among opening audiences, males made up 61%, those aged between 18 and 34 comprised 46% of ticket sales and those below 17 comprised 32%, and the ethnic breakdown was 38% were Hispanic/Latin American, 29% Caucasian, 20% African American, and 13% Asian or other. The film also had the best pandemic-era opening for a children's film, the all-time seventh best April opening, the second best opening of early 2022, and the fifth best opening since 2020. In its second weekend, the film made $29.3 million, finishing second behind Fantastic Beasts: The Secrets of Dumbledore. Sonic 2 returned to the top of the box office on Easter Monday with $4.5 million. By its third weekend, the film surpassed the original Sonic the Hedgehog to become the highest-grossing video game film in North America. The film remained in the box office top ten until dropping out in its twelfth weekend. Sonic the Hedgehog 2 was the ninth-highest-grossing film of 2022 in the U.S. and Canada.

In international regions outside North America, the film opened in 31 markets and grossed $26.1 million in its first weekend, outpacing the original film in these markets. In France, the film made $1.2 million on its first day of screening, reaching the top spot in the charts and surpassing the first film's opening day gross by 30%. In the United Kingdom, it debuted at number one in its first weekend and later retook the top spot from Fantastic Beasts in its fourth weekend with £20.2 million in four weeks. The film crossed the $300 million worldwide mark by its fifth weekend, and the $400 million threshold by its thirteenth.

=== Critical response ===
The review aggregator Rotten Tomatoes reported an approval rating of 69% based on 182 reviews, with an average rating of 6/10. The site's critical consensus reads, "It isn't as much fun as the little blue guy's greatest games, but if you enjoyed the first film, Sonic the Hedgehog 2 serves as a generally acceptable sequel." Metacritic assigned the film a weighted average score of 47 out of 100 based on 33 critics, indicating "mixed or average reviews". Audiences polled by CinemaScore gave the film an average grade of "A" on an A+ to F scale (the same as the first film), while those at PostTrak gave it an 87% positive score, with 74% saying they would definitely recommend it.

Amy Nicholson of The New York Times gave the film a positive review, saying, "Jim Carrey's reprised role as a villainous weirdo helps this fast-paced, family-friendly video-game-movie sequel maintain a refreshing silliness." Nell Minow of Rogerebert.com gave the film a two out of four, writing, "Yes, we know we're appropriating details from better movies. It is over-plotted, with three different storylines mixing comedy and adventure." Alex Stednan of IGN gave the film a seven out of ten, saying, "Sonic the Hedgehog 2 brings all the humor and charm of its predecessor, while also being delightfully more loyal to its source material." Carlos Aguilar of The Wrap also gave the film a positive review, writing, "The screenplay reflects actual effort, and Jim Carrey gets to be unfettered in his performance, leading a surprisingly satisfying follow-up." Leslie Felperin of The Guardian gave the film a three out of four and wrote, "There's not much to spoil about Sonic the Hedgehog 2 because there's not very much to say about it, other than it's mildly amusing and reasonably competently assembled." Brian Shea of Game Informer gave the film an 8.5 out of 10, writing, "While Sonic the Hedgehog's unexpected positive reception could have put its sequel in a difficult spot since it comes in with higher expectations, the Jeff Fowler-directed Sonic the Hedgehog 2 clears the higher bar, delivering a better movie in nearly every way." In a "C+" review, Ross Bonamie of Collider wrote, "Sonic the Hedgehog 2 is at its most clever when it's throwing in these clever nods that will appeal to fans who have waited to see this world come to life on the screen in this way with these characters."

John Nugent of Empire gave the film a two out of five, writing, "Sonic's second outing is little more than a half-baked half-term distraction tool — though Jim Carrey's outrageously committed performance nearly saves the day." Brian Lloyd of Entertainment.ie gave the film a three out of five and said, "Idris Elba as Knuckles is the most galaxy-brain casting idea ever conceived of." Bob Hoose of Plugged In gave the film a positive review, saying, "In short, Sonic the Hedgehog 2 doesn't necessarily grab the gold ring right out the first loop-de-loop, but it won't disappoint the kids or their "fanboy" parents by the time you hit the flag-waving goal." Thomas Floyd of The Washington Post gave the film a two out of four and wrote, "In Sonic the Hedgehog 2, there is no problem that its titular speed demon can't outrun. With that in mind, it's especially perplexing that this video game-inspired sequel should be, of all things, a bit sluggish." In a "C−" review, Siddhant Adlakha of IndieWire wrote, "It's visual soup where nothing pops or stands out. Almost nothing anyone does or says feels rooted in recognizable character traits, and despite Marsden's most sincere efforts, he finds himself once again unable to meet Sonic's eye-line (a production kerfuffle that would be funny, were it not also another reminder of VFX crunch). Then again, who can blame Marsden's character for not wanting to gaze into a soulless blue abyss?"

Fan reactions to the evolving relationship between Agent Stone and Doctor Robotnik in the film were favorable, prompting the creation of shipping and fan fiction, sometimes under the name Stobotnik, that was acknowledged by Majdoub and Carrey.

=== Accolades ===
Accolades received by Sonic the Hedgehog 2 (film)
Award	Date of Ceremony	Category	Recipient(s)	Result	Ref.
The Game Awards	December 8, 2022	Best Adaptation	Sonic the Hedgehog 2	Nominated	
Golden Trailer Awards	October 6, 2022	Best Animation/Family Poster	Sonic the Hedgehog 2 (WORKS ADV)	Nominated	
Black Reel Awards	February 6, 2023	Outstanding Voice Performance	Idris Elba	Nominated	
Movieguide Awards	February 26, 2023	Best Movies for Families	Sonic the Hedgehog 2	Won (Note: Tied with Puss in Boots: The Last Wish (2022))	
Nickelodeon Kids' Choice Awards	March 4, 2023	Favorite Movie	Sonic the Hedgehog 2	Won	
Nickelodeon Kids' Choice Awards	March 4, 2023	Favorite Movie Actor	Jim Carrey	Nominated	

== Sequel film and television series ==
In February 2022, Sega of America and Paramount Pictures confirmed that Sonic the Hedgehog 3 and a Knuckles spin-off miniseries were in development. Elba reprises his role as Knuckles for the series, which was released on the streaming service Paramount+ on April 26, 2024, after being delayed from 2023 due the 2023 Actors and Writers Strike. Sonic the Hedgehog 3 was released theatrically on December 20, 2024. Schwartz reprises his role as Sonic, while Casey, Miller and Whittington return to write the script.

In April 2022, after Carrey announced that he was considering retirement from acting, producers Moritz and Ascher confirmed that his role as Dr. Robotnik would not be recast in any sequels if he followed through with his retirement plans, though they remained hopeful that they could develop scripts good enough for him to continue the role. In February 2024, it was confirmed that Carrey would be reprising his role. Filming began in July 2023 in Farnham, Surrey, England, albeit with no actors due to the 2023 SAG-AFTRA strike.

== See also ==
- List of films based on video games
