= Wedding Peach =

Japanese manga by Sukehiro Tomita and Nao Yazawa

- First tankōbon volume cover, featuring Momoko Hanasaki

愛天使伝説ウェディングピーチ (Ai Tenshi Densetsu Wedingu Pīchi)
- Genre: Magical girl
- Manga
- Written by: Sukehiro Tomita
- Illustrated by: Nao Yazawa
- Published by: Shogakukan
- English publisher: US: Viz Media
- Imprint: Flower Comics
- Magazine: Ciao
- Original run: 1994 – 1996
- Volumes: 6
- Manga

Wedding Peach Ai Tenshi Tanjou hen
- Written by: Mami Tachibana
- Published by: Shogakukan
- Magazine: Shōgaku Yonensei
- Published: 1995
- Volumes: 1
- Anime television series
- Directed by: Kunihiko Yuyama
- Produced by: Hirofumi Umeshita; Keisuke Iwata; Takao Asaga
- Written by: Sukehiro Tomita
- Music by: Tomoki Hasegawa; Hiroyuki Kozu
- Studio: OLM, Inc. (Note: Albeit OLM is not explicitly credited for any animation work, and KSS received the primary animation credit, the episodic production assistants and production desks, who generally belong to the studios producing the series or individual episodes, are mostly associated with OLM. While some episodes seem to have been outsourced or co-produced with other studios according to their associated managers, OLM producer Shouji Oota is credited in every episode of the TV series as a production desk. For the OVA series, OLM is explicitly credited with Production Assistance (制作協力)).)
- Licensed by: NA: ADV Films
- Original network: TXN (TV Tokyo)
- English network: NA: The Anime Network, ImaginAsian
- Original run: April 5, 1995 – March 27, 1996
- Episodes: 51
- Original video animation

Wedding Peach DX
- Directed by: Kunihiko Yuyama
- Produced by: Hirofumi Umeshita; Koji Iwakawa; Shukichi Kanda
- Written by: Kunihiko Yuyama
- Music by: Hiroyuki Kouzu
- Studio: OLM
- Licensed by: NA: ADV Films
- Released: December 24, 1996 – July 25, 1997
- Episodes: 4
- Manga

Wedding Peach Young Love
- Written by: Nao Yazawa
- Published by: Shogakukan
- English publisher: US: Viz Media
- Magazine: Shōgaku Sannensei
- Published: 2004
- Volumes: 1

Wedding Peach (Japanese: 愛天使伝説ウェディングピーチ, Hepburn: Ai Tenshi Densetsu Wedingu Pīchi; lit. 'Legend of the Angel of Love: Wedding Peach') is a Japanese manga written by Sukehiro Tomita and illustrated by Nao Yazawa that was originally serialized in Shogakukan's Ciao magazine. In North America, it was translated and published by VIZ Media in its entirety, consisting of six volumes. The manga was later adapted into an anime television series directed by Kunihiko Yuyama that ran for 51 episodes on TV Tokyo, from April 5, 1995, to March 27, 1996, as well as two omake, Ai Tenshi Robot Wedding Peach and Ai Tenshi Sentai and a four-episode OVA sequel (Wedding Peach DX) in 1996.

Wedding Peach Young Love, a compilation of Wedding Peach stories made specifically for the monthly magazine Shogaku Sannensei (lit. 'Third grade elementary school student'), was released in 2004. It features younger-looking characters, less complex storytelling, and simpler dialogues.

In 2021, Tomita released a Visual Novel, Sequel to Wedding Peach, titled Ai Tenshi Seiki Wedding Apple. Which features five new women as love angels in a modern telling of where Wedding peach left off.

== Plot ==
Momoko Hanasaki, along with her friends Yuri Tanima and Hinagiku Tamano, are members of the newspaper club where they mostly cover the school's soccer team. They all have a crush on the star player Kazuya Yanagiba.

On their way home from school one day, the trio are attacked by a devil by the name of Pluie who is a servant to the high ruler of the devil world, Raindevila. When her friends are hypnotized into attacking Momoko, a beautiful man comes down from the sky named Limone. He is from the angel world and gives Momoko a compact case. Opening the compact, she is told by the goddess Aphrodite, the ruler of the angel world, that she is one of the legendary Love Angels, Wedding Peach.

Momoko transforms into Wedding Peach and manages to snap her friends out of Pluie's control. Over the course of the story, Yuri and Hinagiku and later Scarlet O'Hara also find out that they are also love angels and the three (later four) must protect the humans from the devils and defeat Raindevila.

== Characters ==
=== Love Angels ===
Momoko Hanasaki (花咲 ももこ, Hanasaki Momoko) / Wedding Peach (ウェディングピーチ, Wedingu Pīchi)
Voiced by: Kyoko Hikami (Japanese); Larissa Wolcott (English)
Momoko is the main character of the series. With Limone and Aphrodite coming to her aid, she is given the power to transform into Wedding Peach, the legendary Love Angel. In Hanazono Junior High, Momoko is a photographer of the Newspaper Club and has a massive crush on Kazuya Yanagiba, captain of the soccer team. Her theme color is pink.
Yuri Tanima (谷間 ゆり, Tanima Yuri) / Angel Lily (エンジェルリリィ, Enjuru Riryi)
Voiced by: Yukana Nogami (Japanese); Carla Witt (English)
One of Momoko's best friends, Yuri is a rich girl who normally speaks politely. Like Momoko, Yuri can transform into a Love Angel (Lily), reborn on Earth as a human. Her theme color is blue.
Hinagiku Tamano (珠野 ひなぎく, Tamano Hinagiku) / Angel Daisy (エンジェルデイジー, Enjuru Deijī)
Voiced by: Yūko Miyamura (Japanese); Heather Kafka (English)
Hinagiku is a tomboy with a rough way of speaking who practices judo. Her family owns a flower shop. Her theme color is green.
Scarlet O'Hara (スカーレット 小原, Sukāretto Ohara) / Angel Salvia (エンジェルサルビア, Enjerusarubia)
Voiced by: Yuka Imai (Japanese); T. Lynn Mikeska (English)
Scarlet is a girl who have transferred in Private School and also she was an Angel who came from the Heavens. Her theme color is red.

=== Other Angels ===
Kazuya Yanagiba (柳葉 和也, Yanagiba Kazuya) / Limone (リモーネ, Rimōne)
Voiced by: Shin-ichiro Miki (Japanese); Brian Jepson (English)
Kazuya is captain of Hanazono Junior High's soccer team known for being good-looking and smart, capturing the hearts of many female students. Momoko, Yuri, and Hinagiku would often resort to crazy means to garner his attention, but he remains blissfully oblivious to almost all of their attempts.
Aphrodite (アフロディーテ, Afurodīte)
Voiced by: Mako Hyōdō (Japanese); Catherine Berry (English)
Goddess of love and beauty and ruler of the angel world. She is unable to leave the angel world and must rely on Limone and the Love Angels to ward off the devils. Aphrodite is the sister of Angel Celeste, Momoko's mother, and considered Momoko's aunt respectively.
Sakura Hanasaki (花咲さくら)/Celeste (セレーソ, Serēso)
Voiced by: Chiharu Suzuka (Japanese); Marla Kanoff (English)
Celeste is the sister and guardian of Aphrodite. While fighting against devils with Angels Lily, Daisy and Salvia, she was knocked down to earth, losing her memory. Celeste begins to use the name Sakura. On Earth, she falls in love with Shoichiro Hanasaki, a young photographer. They have a daughter together.

=== Devils ===
Raindevila (レインデビラ, Reindebira)/Avers (アヴェルス, Avers)
Voiced by: Mika Doi (Japanese); Lainie Frasier (English)
Raindevila is leader of the devil world. She aims to destroy all love and the angel world. It is later revealed that Raindevila lead rebellious devils to take over the entire Devil World from Uragano due to her heartbreak after she fell in love with an angel that married another angel, and she eliminated anyone from the Devil World in whoever is opposed against her reign.
Uragano (ウラガノ, Uragano)
Voiced by: Tetsuo Kanao (ep 18), Masashi Sugawara (ep. 48/49) (Japanese); Richard Kraft (English)
the legendary pure devil and leader of the Rafaal Tribe who leads the devils against the angels during the ensuing war and Yousuke's father. In Episode 49 as a spirit comes out of his golden bell
Yousuke Fuuma (風摩 ようすけ, Fūma Yōsuke)/Viento (ビエント, Biento)
Voiced by: Yuji Ueda (Japanese); Gray G. Haddock (English)
An arrogant boy captain of the soccer team and later love interest for Momoko Hanasaki, who he calls "Momo-pi". It is later revealed that he is Viento, a demon son of Uragano, the past leader of the demon tribe. He is purified and later turns into Momoko's boyfriend by the end of the series. He instructs his son to fight and defeat Raindevila in order to return the Devil World back to its former glory and he uses the last of his strength to release the Love Angels including his son after his spirit disappears and Viento mourns over his father's loss.
Pluie (プリュイ, Puryui)
Voiced by: Kazuki Yao (Japanese); Ben Wolfe (English)
Pluie is the first of Raindevila's primary followers to appear in the story. He enacts various schemes to both destroy love and lure out the Love Angels, but eventually is sucked into the vortex of destruction as punishment for countless defeats by Raindevila.
Jama-P (じゃ魔ピー, Jamapī)
Voiced by: Miwa Matsumoto (Japanese); Bill Wise (English)
Jama-P is a small devil that served as Pluie's sidekick until he was purified by Wedding Peach, and subsequently forced out of the devil realm.
Aquelda (アクエルダ, Akueruda)
Voiced by: Rica Fukami (Japanese); Alexis Chadow (English)
Aquelda is the second of Raindevila's primary followers, only appearing in the anime. She aims to follow Raindevila's commands while also making money in the human world, most of the time cheating people out of their money.
Igneous (イグノウス, Igunousu)
Voiced by: Tomokazu Seki (Japanese); Nicholas Keene (English)
Igneous is the third devil of Raindevila's primary followers. A manipulative fire demon from the tribe of Hima who makes a contract with Takuro Amano. Over time, Igneous develops a fond, secret friendship with Takuro and begins to appreciate peace and quiet, later realising Takuro and being eventually killed by Potamos after his defeat by the Love Angels. It is later implied that he was reborn as a normal human.
Potamos (ポタモス, Potamosu) / Hiromi Kawanami (ひろみ川浪, Kawanami Hiromi)
Voiced by: Kotono Mitsuishi (Japanese); Jenny Larson (English)
Potamos is the fourth devil of Raindevila's primary followers. A water demon that was in love with Igneous and later falls in love with Yousuke Fuuma. Potamos dies using all of her energy fighting the Love Angels and later is revived and purified by Peach Love using the Saint Crystal. She, now as Hiromi Kawanami, apologices to Yousuke and later finds a man that seems to be a rencarnated Igneous. Exclusively in the anime, Hiromi later returns as the 5th Love Angel, Angel Potamos (エンジェルポタモス, Enjeru Potamosu).

== Media ==
=== Manga ===
The manga was written and illustrated by Nao Yazawa. It was serialized the Shogakukan's Ciao magazine from March 1994 to April 1996. Shogakukan released the manga in six volumes from September 1994 to April 1996. Viz Media licensed the manga in North America and released the manga from July 10, 2003, to May 26, 2004. The series is now out-of-print.

No.	Original release date	Original ISBN	North American release date	North American ISBN
1	September 1994	9784091361813	July 10, 2003	9781591160762
2	April 1995	9784091361820	October 15, 2003	9781591160779
3	August 1995	9784091361837	November 10, 2003	9781591161059
4	January 1996	9784091361844	January 28, 2004	9781591161325
5	March 1996	9784091361851	March 24, 2004	9781591162575
6	April 1996	9784091361868	May 26, 2004	9781591163237

=== Anime ===
An anime television series premiered on TV Tokyo from April 5, 1995, to March 27, 1996, and ran for 51 episodes. The anime was directed by Kunihiko Yuyama and was co-produced by KSS and OLM, Inc. A four-episode OVA titled Wedding Peach DX (Deluxe) was released from November 1996 to March 1997. ADV Films licensed the anime in 2003 and released the anime in ten DVD.

==== Episodes ====
===== Wedding Peach =====
No.	Title	Original release date
1	"Celebration! Birth of the Love Angel"; Transliteration: "Shuku! Ai Tenshi Tanjō" (Japanese: 祝！愛天使誕生)	April 5, 1995
While trying her mother's wedding dress, Momoko is startled when her best friends Yuri Tanima and Hinagiku Tamano suddenly open the front door of her house. The two girls tell Momoko they have to make a report for the school soccer match for the school newspaper. Meanwhile, Pluie and Jama-P try to steal Momoko's ring.
2	"Splendid! Bridal Dress Change"; Transliteration: "Appare! Oironaoshi" (Japanese: あっぱれ！お色直し)	April 12, 1995
Momoko, Yuri, and Hinagiku catch up to the soccer team having a practice match. A soccer ball suddenly comes hitting Momoko in the face, knocking her unconscious. Jama-P appears and tells Momoko to give her the ruby ring, which she refuses, while Pluie takes it away with his evil energy. As the whole class is affected by Pluie's power, Momoko purifies Pluie with her attack, Saint Miroir Bridal Flash.
3	"The Targeted Bride"; Transliteration: "Nerawareta Hanayome" (Japanese: ねらわれた花嫁)	April 19, 1995
The school's soccer team is hosting practice match with Momoko, Yuri, and Hinagiku watching them. Meanwhile, Susumu Shindō – a former player of the school's soccer team – announces his marriage to a woman named Mimiko. She soon becomes Jama-P's target which Momoko and friends have to fight.
4	"Angel Lily Is Born"; Transliteration: "Angel Riryi Tanjō" (Japanese: エンジェルリリィ誕生)	April 26, 1995
Yuri's mom shows Yuri the wedding dress she is going to wear to the upcoming fashion show. Momoko and Hinagiku eagerly ask to try on the dresses Yuri promised, but refuse. Meanwhile, Yuri finds her parents being attacked by Pluie.
5	"The Third Love Angel"; Transliteration: "3-ninme no Aitenshi" (Japanese: 3人目の愛天使)	May 3, 1995
Hinagiku helps her father designing flower bouquets, but Jama-P uses his powers to attack Momoko with floating cans.
6	"Jama P's Counterattack"; Transliteration: "Jama Pi no Gyakushuu" (Japanese: じゃ魔ピーの逆襲)	May 10, 1995
7	"Take Care Against Eating Too Much"; Transliteration: "Tabesugi ni Goyōjin" (Japanese: 食べすぎにご用心)	May 17, 1995
8	"Pajama and the Sleeping Princess"; Transliteration: "Pajama to Nemuri-hime" (Japanese: パジャ魔と眠り姫)	May 24, 1995
9	"The Stolen Something Four"; Transliteration: "Ubawareta Samushingu Fō" (Japanese: 奪われたサムシングフォー)	May 31, 1995
10	"Good Work! Friendship Renewal"; Transliteration: "Omigoto! Yūjō Oironaoshi" (Japanese: お見事！友情お色直し)	June 7, 1995
11	"Time Traveling Hinagiku"; Transliteration: "Toki wo Kakeru Hinagiku" (Japanese: 時をかけるひなぎく)	June 14, 1995
12	"The Beautiful Devil's Love Fortune-telling"; Transliteration: "Bijin Akuma no Koi Uranai" (Japanese: 美人悪魔の恋占い)	June 21, 1995
13	"Challenge! The Devil's PK Battle"; Transliteration: "Shōbu! Akuma no PK-sen" (Japanese: 勝負！悪魔のPK戦)	June 28, 1995
14	"The Stolen Ring of Love"; Transliteration: "Ubawareta Ai no Yubiwa" (Japanese: 奪われた愛の指輪)	July 5, 1995
15	"Infiltration! The Devil's Forest"; Transliteration: "Sen'nyū! Akuma no Mori" (Japanese: 潜入! 悪魔の森)	July 12, 1995
16	"The Devil's Pride"; Transliteration: "Akumazoku no Hokori" (Japanese: 悪魔族の誇り)	July 19, 1995
17	"The Secret of Saint Hanazano Campus"; Transliteration: "Sei Hanazono Gakuen no Himitsu" (Japanese: 聖花園学園の秘密)	July 26, 1995
18	"Love Angels, We'll Fight Even During Summer Vacation!"; Transliteration: "Aitenshi, Natsuyasumi mo Tatakau wa!" (Japanese: 愛天使、夏休みも戦うわ!)	August 2, 1995
19	"Midsummer Night's Mystery"; Transliteration: "Manatsu no Yoru no Shinpi" (Japanese: 真夏の夜の神秘)	August 9, 1995
20	"Seaside Pendant"; Transliteration: "Umibe no Pendanto" (Japanese: 海辺のペンダント)	August 16, 1995
21	"Resound, Piano, to the Starry Sky"; Transliteration: "Piano yo Hibike Hoshizora ni" (Japanese: ピアノよ響け星空に)	August 23, 1995
22	"Jama-P Targeted"; Transliteration: "Nerawareta Jama-Pi" (Japanese: ねらわれたじゃ魔ピー)	August 30, 1995
23	"My First Kiss Is Going to Be Stolen"; Transliteration: "Hatsu Kisu ga Ubawareru" (Japanese: 初キスが奪われる!)	September 6, 1995
24	"Exciting School Festival"; Transliteration: "Doki-doki Gakuensai" (Japanese: ドキドキ学園祭)	September 13, 1995
25	"A Devil's Kiss Isnt Sweet"; Transliteration: "Akuma no Kisu wa Amakunai" (Japanese: 悪魔のキスは甘くない)	September 20, 1995
26	"The False Wedding Ceremony"; Transliteration: "Itsuwari no Kekkonshiki" (Japanese: いつわりの結婚式)	September 27, 1995
27	"No Way! Senior Yanagiba Has a Lover?"; Transliteration: "Uso! Yanagiba-sama ni Koibito?" (Japanese: ウソ！柳葉さまに恋人？)	October 4, 1995
28	"Girls In Love Are the Strongest!"; Transliteration: "Koisuru Shoujo wa Saikyo yo!" (Japanese: 恋する少女は最強よ！)	October 11, 1995
29	"A Halloween Witch"; Transliteration: "Harouin na Majo" (Japanese: ハロウィンな魔女)	October 18, 1995
30	"Goodbye, Dear Devil"; Transliteration: "Guddobai, Akuma-sama" (Japanese: グッバイ悪魔さま)	October 25, 1995
31	"Trespassing! Rival for His Love"; Transliteration: "Rannyuu! Koi no Rival" (Japanese: 乱入！恋のライバル)	November 1, 1995
32	"Put Your Love In a Muffler"; Transliteration: "Mafurā ni Ai wo Komete" (Japanese: マフラーに愛を込めて)	November 8, 1995
33	"The Love That Bloomed on the Battlefield"; Transliteration: "Senjō ni Saita Koi" (Japanese: 戦場に咲いた恋)	November 15, 1995
34	"The Marionette of Love"; Transliteration: "Koi no Ayatsuri Ningyou" (Japanese: 恋のあやつり人形)	November 22, 1995
35	"The Fourth Love Angel"; Transliteration: "Yonin-me no Aitenshi" (Japanese: 四人目の愛天使)	November 29, 1995
36	"The Lone Wolf Love Angel"; Transliteration: "Hitoribocchi no Aitenshi" (Japanese: 一人ぼっちの愛天使)	December 6, 1995
37	"Salvia's Tears"; Transliteration: "Sarubia no Namida" (Japanese: サルビアの涙)	December 13, 1995
38	"Passionate Farewell Kiss"; Transliteration: "Owakare no Atsui Kisu" (Japanese: お別れの熱いキス)	December 20, 1995
39	"The Teacher Is a Devil?"; Transliteration: "Sensei wa Akuma?" (Japanese: 先生は悪魔？)	December 27, 1995
40	"My Love Is Sucked Away!"; Transliteration: "Ai ga Suwarechau!" (Japanese: 愛が吸われちゃう！)	January 10, 1996
41	"Pretend Love Big Ski"; Transliteration: "Ren'ai Gokko Dai Sukī" (Japanese: 恋愛ごっこ大スキー)	January 17, 1996
42	"Yuri's L-i-p-s"; Transliteration: "Yuri no Ku-chi-bi-ru" (Japanese: ゆりのく・ち・び・る)	January 24, 1996
43	"The Truth About Raindevila"; Transliteration: "Reindebira no Shinjitsu" (Japanese: レインデビラの真実)	January 31, 1996
44	"Jama-P's First Love"; Transliteration: "Jama-Pi no Hatsukoi" (Japanese: じゃ魔ピーの初恋)	February 7, 1996
45	"Mama has Come Home"; Transliteration: "Kaettekita Mama" (Japanese: 帰ってきたママ)	February 14, 1996
46	"My Boyfriend is a Devil"; Transliteration: "Watashi no Koibito wa Akuma" (Japanese: 私の恋人は悪魔)	February 21, 1996
47	"Revive, Memories of Love"; Transliteration: "Yomigaere, Ai no Kioku" (Japanese: よみがえれ、愛の記憶)	February 28, 1996
48	"Loving Is Painful"; Transliteration: "Ai Suredo Setsunaku" (Japanese: 愛すれどせつなく)	March 6, 1996
49	"The Night for Just the Two of Us"; Transliteration: "Futari Dake no Yoru" (Japanese: 2人だけの夜)	March 13, 1996
50	"Inseparable Hearts"; Transliteration: "Hanarenai Kokoro" (Japanese: 離れない心)	March 20, 1996
51	"Last Wedding"; Transliteration: "Rasuto Wedingu" (Japanese: ラスト・ウェディング)	March 27, 1996

===== Wedding Peach DX =====
No.	Title	Original release date
1	"Revival of the Love Angels! We'll Fight Even When We Go to the Beach"; Transliteration: "Ai Tenshi Fukkatsu! Umi ni Ittemo Tatakau wa" (Japanese: 愛天使復活! 〜海に行っても戦うわ〜)	December 24, 1996
2	"Salvia's Love: We'll Fight Even On a Luxury Liner"; Transliteration: "Sarubia no Koi: Gouka Kyakusen Demo Tatakau wa" (Japanese: サルビアの恋 〜豪華客船でも戦うわ〜)	February 28, 1997
3	"Reunion: We'll Fight Even On Christmas Eve"; Transliteration: "Saikai: Kurisumasu Demo Tatakau wa" (Japanese: 再会 〜クリスマスでも戦うわ〜)	April 25, 1997
4	"The False Love Angels: We'll Fight Even On Valentine's Day"; Transliteration: "Itsuwari no Ai Tenshi: Barentain Demo Tatakau wa" (Japanese: 偽りの愛天使 〜バレンタインでも戦うわ〜)	July 25, 1997

===== Omake =====
No.	Title
1	"Episode 10,526: Sorry, Yousuke"; Transliteration: "Dai-10,526-kai: Gomen ne Yousuke no Maki" (Japanese: 第10,526回 ごめんねえようすけの巻)
2	"Final Episode: The Love Angel Task Force's Final Battle"; Transliteration: "Saishūkai: Ai Tenshi Sentai Saigo no Tatakai" (Japanese: 最終回 愛天使戦隊最後の戦い)
