= Yasushi Yamaguchi =

Japanese game designer

Yasushi Yamaguchi (山口 恭史, Yamaguchi Yasushi) is a Japanese game designer and artist. He designed the character Miles "Tails" Prower in an internal contest hosted by Sonic Team. He originally named the character "Miles Prower", however Sega wanted to call the character "Tails". SEGA and Yamaguchi reached a compromise on his name, with "Miles Prower" being the character's full legal name and "Tails" being his nickname.

His main work was that of both creating and designing Tails as well as being the Chief Artist and one of the Zone artists in Sonic the Hedgehog 2.

He also worked as the Special Stage Designer in Sonic CD and on other Sega related games.

== Production history ==
- Cyborg Hunter (1988) — Designer
- Phantasy Star II (1989) — Mechanical Design
- Last Battle (1989) — Special Designer under the name Judy Totoya
- Sorcerian (1990) - Graphic Designer for the Mega Drive version under the name Judy Totoya
- Advanced Daisenryaku (1991) - Unit Design - Land Unit for the Mega Drive version under the name Judy★Totoya
- Sonic the Hedgehog 2 (1992) — Character Design, Chief Artist, Zone Artist
- Kid Chameleon (1992) — Art
- Sonic the Hedgehog CD (1993) — Special Stage Designer
- Magic Knight Rayearth (1995) — Art Director
- Wachenröder (1998) — Character Design
