= Nao Yazawa =

Japanese manga artist

- Area: Manga artist
- Notable works: Wedding Peach

Nao Yazawa (谷沢 直, Yazawa Nao; born on July 29) is a Japanese manga artist born in Tokyo, Japan. Her most notable series is Wedding Peach, which was made into an anime series of the same name, and was published worldwide. Since then she has worked on manga of all sorts, some of which have been released first in English and through ebooks. She is currently freelancing and teaching classes in manga.

== Biography ==
One of Yazawa's earliest manga works was a dojinshi work called Itadaki! Panther which ran in a small monthly magazine called Pyon Pyon. Yazawa started with Shogakukan in 1990, during which she released Wedding Peach. Wedding Peach ran in Ciao magazine from 1994 to 1996, published by Shogakukan for six tankōbon volumes, and was adapted into an anime series. She worked on several other stories until 2000. In 2003, she released the shojo manga Nozomi, a story about a girl who makes a wish upon a falling star and meets a demon who teaches her about love. It was the first manga she drew for English readers. She attended Anime Expo that year to promote Nozomi and Wedding Peach. In 2010, she released Mizuki through Digital Manga Publishing. The story is about a teenage girl who transforms into a devil whenever she gets angry and must fight a bevy of evil monsters. In 2011, she released Moon and Blood on Digital Manga Publishing in English prior to the Japanese release. Moon and Blood is about a teen vampire guy who stays with a family. In 2012, she begin teaching courses on how to make manga in Tokyo; this led to her creating online English courses as well as teaching overseas through Japan Foundation Toronto. In 2013, she published her autobiographical four-panel manga Go-Go Nao-P in English. She self-published the post-apocalyptic Shinku-Chitai (The Isolated Zone) manga which was picked up by a German monthly magazine Manga Power.

== Works ==
Title	Year	Notes	Refs
Wedding Peach	1994–96	Serialized in Ciao magazine Published by Shogakukan, 6 volumes (7 in Germany)	
Nozomi	2003	Originally published in English by Fanboy Entertainment and Plex	
Nao Yazawa Collection	2003	Three volumes published by Egmount in Germany	
Mizuki	2010	Published by Digital Manga	
Moon and Blood	2011–14	Originally published in English by Digital Manga Publishing, 4 volumes	
Mother Teresa	2011	Biography manga	ISBN 978-4-591-12611-0
Go Go Nao-P		Autobiography four-panel manga Published on Amazon Kindle Direct	
Shinku-Chitai (aka The Isolated Zone)	2013–present	Self-published in Japan, 12 volumes; 1 volume was published by Digital Manga Guild	
