= Tails' Skypatrol =

1995 video game

- Developers: Japan System House; SIMS
- Publisher: Sega
- Composer: Chikayo Fukuda
- Series: Sonic the Hedgehog
- Platform: Game Gear
- Release: JP: April 28, 1995
- Genre: Scrolling shooter

Tails' Skypatrol (Note: Japanese: テイルスのスカイパトロール, Hepburn: Teirusu no Sukai Patorōru) is a 1995 horizontally scrolling shooter video game developed by Japan System House and published by Sega for the Game Gear. It is a spin-off of the Sonic the Hedgehog franchise, and one of two Game Gear games to star Sonic's sidekick Tails. The player controls the titular character in his quest to stop the evil witch Witchcart before she conquers an island and turns its inhabitants into crystals. Gameplay involves shooting enemies, collecting power-ups, and defeating bosses.

Skypatrol was developed by Japan System House with assistance from SIMS, a part-owned subsidiary of Sega at the time. It was in development as an educational game for a cancelled handheld system, before being moved to the Game Gear. It did not feature the Sonic branding until it was presented to Sega, which requested the main character be replaced with Tails. Skypatrol received mixed reviews, with critics focusing specifically on its high difficulty and poor controls. It has been re-released through Sonic Adventure DX: Director's Cut (2003), Sonic Gems Collection (2005), and Sonic Origins Plus (2023).

== Gameplay ==
Tails flying past a rotating spike obstacle

Tails' Skypatrol is a horizontal-scrolling shooter set within the Sonic the Hedgehog universe. Its plot involves Sonic's sidekick, Miles "Tails" Prower, traveling to a tropical island to stop the villainous Witchcart, who has turned its inhabitants into crystals. Tails flies by spinning his two tails, is always flying, and can be maneuvered up and down to avoid obstacles and left and right to slow down or speed up. Collecting mint candies replenishes Tails' constantly-depleting flight meter. If Tails is hit by an enemy, he falls toward the ground and the player must recover. Touching a level's environment will cost the player a life. Tails uses a gold ring as a weapon that can be thrown to defeat enemies, bypass traps, and retrieve items.

There are five scrolling levels to traverse, which vary in difficulty and take place in locations such as forests and castles. Levels conclude with a boss fight against one of Witchcart's henchmen. The player has unlimited continues and will begin at the start of that particular stage after losing all of their lives.

== Development and release ==
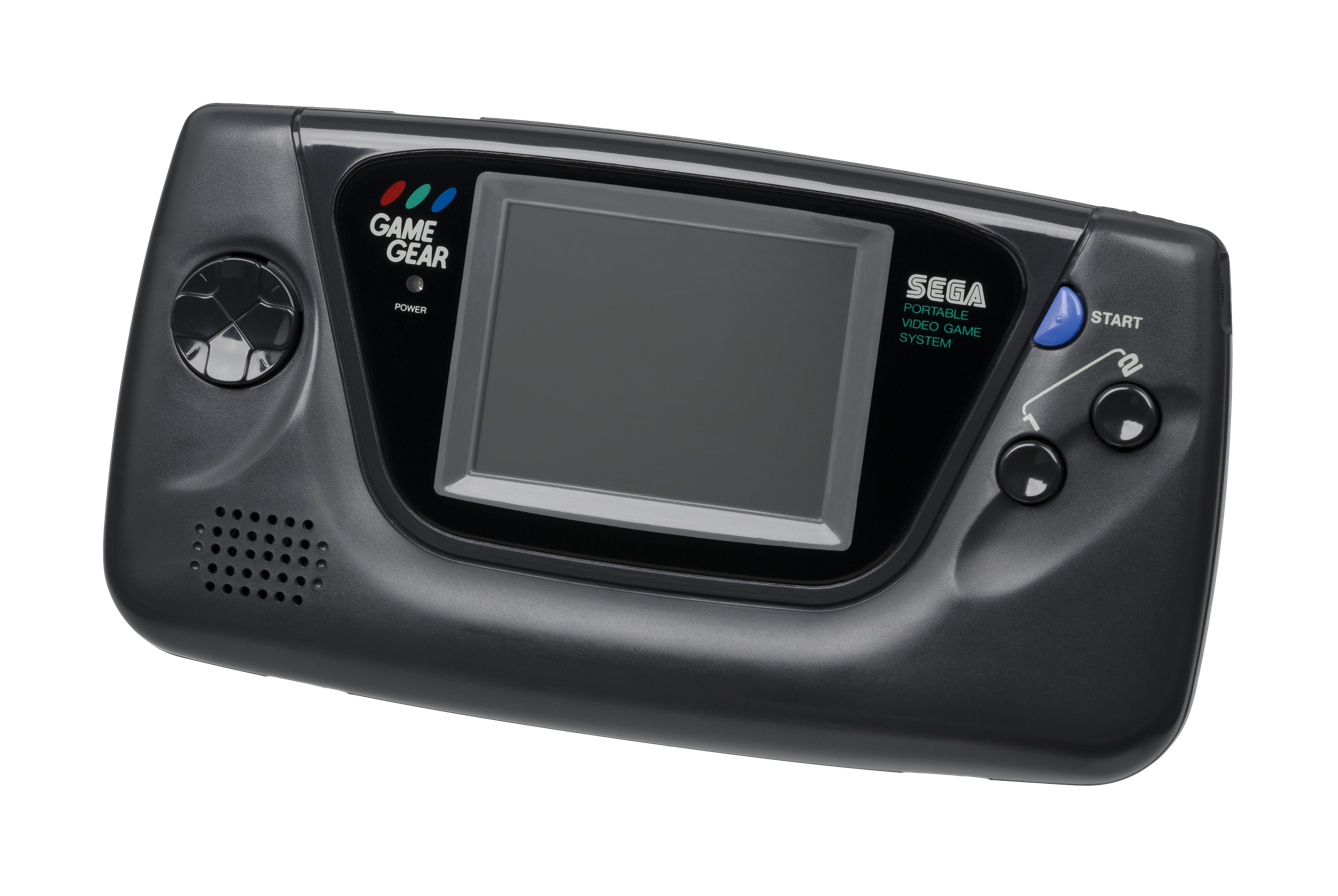
Tails' Skypatrol was originally in production for an unreleased handheld before it was moved to the Game Gear (pictured above).

Tails' Skypatrol was developed by Japan System House (JSH), a company known for its work on 8-bit conversions of Sega games throughout the early 1990s, with assistance from part-owned Sega subsidiary SIMS. JSH initially developed the game not as part of the Sonic the Hedgehog franchise. The game was originally intended as a launch title for an unreleased handheld console, which used original characters and had a more educational focus. When the system was cancelled, the company chose to remake the game for the Game Gear, a handheld that posed similar hardware specifications and the same screen resolution. Upon completion, it was presented to Sega, which requested that the main character be replaced with Tails. Along with Tails Adventure, it is one of two Sonic the Hedgehog games on the Game Gear to star Tails.

Tails' Skypatrol was released in Japan on April 28, 1995. It is included as an unlockable extra in Sonic Adventure DX: Director's Cut (2003), alongside eleven other Sonic Game Gear games, which also marks the game's first release outside Japan. The 2005 compilation Sonic Gems Collection includes Tails' Skypatrol and several other Sonic and Sega games. It was also part of the 2023 compilation Sonic Origins Plus.

Japan System House, who had by then renamed themselves Biox, later sought to port the game to Game Boy Color while replacing all Sonic elements with original characters. While the port was completed, under the name Boon Boon Kabun, it was ultimately cancelled due to unspecified contractual reasons.

== Reception ==
Reception

Review scores
Publication	Score
Famitsu	5/10, 6/10, 6/10, 5/10
Sega Saturn Magazine (JP)	6.5/10

Tails' Skypatrol received largely unfavorable reviews. Upon release, a reviewer for Sega Saturn Magazine found it to be among the weakest entries in the Sonic series, particularly for its poor controls and harsh difficulty. However, they commented that its drastically-different gameplay made it a unique and interesting game on its own. In reviewing the game's inclusion in Sonic Gems Collection, Louis Bedigian stated that Tails' Skypatrol is "the most interesting of these [included Game Gear games], as it's entirely airborne with Tails collecting rings and solving simple puzzles." 1Up.com's Jeremy Parish called the game and Tails Adventure "garbage that I wouldn't even want to play on Game Gear, let alone on GameCube."

Retrospectively, Tails' Skypatrol reception has been similar. USgamer ranked Tails' Skypatrol 26th of 28 Sonic the Hedgehog series games, above only the 2006 video game Sonic the Hedgehog and 2005's Shadow the Hedgehog. Reviewer Nadia Oxford called the game "adorable", but difficult to control with the large sprites used in the game, similar to other titles for the Game Gear. The editor of USgamer, in the same list, called the game "a pretty obvious cash-in on the brand". Writing for Retro Gamer, Kim Wild stated that the game's awkward controls and camera angle made playing the game frustrating. Jim McGrath of Hardcore Gaming 101 was more positive about the game. He gave credence to the game's high difficulty because of the nature of Tails' hitbox and poor teaching in the "training" level, but also stated "there's something to enjoy" for players who get used to the game. McGrath had praise for the game's graphics and sound, but was critical of the game's short length and repetitive boss fights. He called the game as a whole "a decent romp that's worth checking out for fans of Tails and the curious".
