= Fighting Foodons =

Manga, anime, and video game franchise

格闘料理伝説ビストロレシピ (Kakutō Ryōri Densetsu Bistro Recipe)
- Genre: Fantasy
- Manga
- Written by: Shuntarō Ashida
- Illustrated by: Naoto Tsushima
- Published by: Kodansha
- Magazine: Comic BonBon
- Original run: September 1999 – September 2000
- Volumes: 2
- Video game

Fighting Cooking Legend Bistro Recipe - Wonder Battle Version
- Developer: Red Entertainment
- Publisher: Banpresto
- Platform: WonderSwan
- Released: September 30, 1999
- Anime television series
- Directed by: Tetsuo Yasumi
- Produced by: Eizo Kondo, Wataru Tanaka, Masahiro Kon, Hideki Kama, Masaki Kobayashi
- Written by: Taku Kadoya
- Music by: Izumu/Geminiart High Quality
- Studio: Group TAC
- Licensed by: NA: Discotek Media
- Original network: NHK-BS2
- English network: AU: Network 10; CA: Fairchild TV; US: 4KidsTV
- Original run: December 11, 2001 – June 25, 2002
- Episodes: 26

Fighting Foodons, known in Japan as Bistro Recipe (格闘料理伝説ビストロレシピ, Kakutō Ryōri Densetsu Bisutoro Reshipi, "Martial Arts Cooking Legend Bistro Recipe"), is a Japanese manga series written by Shuntarō Ashida and illustrated by Naoto Tsushima and serialized in Comic BonBon from September 1999 to September 2000. The story was adapted into an anime television series which aired on NHK-BS2 satellite channel from December 11, 2001, to June 25, 2002. The manga ran simultaneously with a video games series of the same name, two on Game Boy Color are released in 1999 in Japan, as well as a WonderSwan game.

In the United States, the anime was dubbed by 4Kids Entertainment in cooperation with Enoki Films; Enoki Films held the license and contracted the dubbing to 4Kids. This show originally aired on the FoxBox on September 14, 2002, (later known as 4Kids TV) and was discontinued from their lineup on August 30, 2003. The Chinese version was premiered as Kung Fu Snacks (功夫小食神 Gōngfu xiǎo shíshén) and it aired on TVB Jade in Hong Kong. It had also aired on Fairchild TV in Canada starting on May 22, 2005.

The series was released on DVD by Discotek Media on April 25, 2017.

Its English dub's theme song is based on Jacques Offenbach's Orpheus in the Underworld.

== Plot ==
It all started some years ago when a culinary-confused king asked a question to his chefs. Which would be stronger: tofu surprise or stuffed duck? The king's chefs thought the king had "gone a little too heavy on the nutmeg". One mysterious chef knew what the king was talking about and presented him with magical cards called Meal Tickets which turns the food into monsters called Fighting Foodons. Since that day, regular food recipes have been turned into Foodons when the art of culinary combat is concocted.

One day, King Gorgeous Gorge and his Gluttons cook up a devious plan to rule the world and they sprinkled an extra dash of destruction. They plan to rule the world by kidnapping the best chefs & forcing them to make powerful, evil Foodons. A boy named Chase, a young apprentice chef with an appetite for action, thinks he has what it takes to become an Elite Master Chef like his dad Chef Jack. Chase believes that he, his friends, family, and Foodons can change the world, one at a time, even if it involves going into battle against the Glutton Gormandizers, King Gorge's Big 4, and King Gorge's female cat-like servant Clawdia. Then, he'd have a final showdown with King Gorge.

== Characters ==
=== Protagonists ===
Zen Makunouchi (幕之内 膳, Makunōchi Zen) / Chase
Voiced by: Chika Sakamoto (Japanese); Tara Sands (English)
The main protagonist of the series. Chase is a 10-year-old, impatient chef-in-training from Yokohoma. He's the son of Chef Jack and the brother of Kayla. He trains under the Foodon guru Oslo to make more Foodons so that he would become a Master Chef like his dad. His Foodons are Fried Ricer (who turns into Super Fried Ricer when with Fruit Turtle or Feastavus), Hot Doggone-It, Burnt Meatballs who are usually out, Shrimp Daddy, Dim-Sumthin' Special, Fruit Turtle, and Feastivus (a Deluxe Foodon fused by Shrimp Daddy, Dim-Sumthin' Special, Sir Dumpling, and the Burnt Meatballs).
Karin Makunouchi (幕之内 花梨, Makunōchi Karin) / Kayla
Voiced by: Megumi Nasu (Japanese); Amy Palant (English)
Kayla is Chase's 8-year-old sister who fights with Coco for Chase's attention. She is usually seen guarding the Mobile Attack Cuisine Cart (or M.A.C. Cart for short). Her Foodon is Omelet who is usually out.
Tsukiji Makunouchi (幕之内 月次, Makunōchi Tsukiji) / Chef Jack
Voiced by: Masami Iwasaki (Japanese); Ted Lewis (English)
Chef Jack is a Master Chef and the father of Chase and Kayla. He's the leader of the Rebel Chef who fight against King Gorgeous Gorge. At the time of his disappearance, he disguised himself and called himself Chef John (known as Clown in the original version) to help out Chase on different occasions until his mask was destroyed during the final fight with Rose Marinade. His Foodon's Tofurious. While disguised as Chef John, he used Shark-Fin Soup on occasion.
Haoji (ハオヂィ, Haojī) / Oslo
Voiced by: Wataru Takagi (Japanese); Maddie Blaustein (old), Oliver Wyman (young) (English)
Oslo is a Grub Guru and was King of All Food until his student King Gorge reverted him to a short man who rides on a floating saucer. He has trained Chef Jack and is training Chase to become a Master Chef.
Pi-tan (ピータン, Pī-tan) / Pie Tin
Voiced by: Yuko Mita (Japanese); Kayzie Rogers (English)
Pie Tin is a 6-year-old boy from Horai whose parents were captured by the Glutton Gormandizers. He joins Chase to rescue them and fight King Gorge. His Foodon is Sir Dumpling.
Natsume (ナツメ, Natsume) / Coco
Voiced by: Chisa Yokoyama (Japanese); Lisa Ortiz (English)
Coco is a sneaky masked ninja girl who wears a wok on her head and is a student of Chef John. Chase first met her on Banana Island. Coco later became friends with him and fights with Kayla for his attention upon developing a crush on him. Her Foodons are Doughnut-So, Ham Scam-Witch, and Tater Tons. On occasion, Coco would use her wok for offensive attacks.
Ash (アッシュ, Asshu) / Albert
Voiced by: Hikaru Tokita (Japanese); Andrew Rannells (English)
Albert is a chef who Chase and Pie Tin meet at a Foodon Tournament. He is a fan of Chef Jack and later helps Chase on occasion until he joins Chase's group following Rose Marinade's defeat. His Foodons are Cowboyritto, Spaghettabout-It, and Crab Quake.

=== Glutton Empire ===
Don Cook (ドン・クック, Don Kukku) / King Gorgeous Gorge
Voiced by: Jin Nishimura (Japanese); Michael Alston Bailey (English)
The primary antagonist of the series. King Gorgeous Gorge was one of Oslo's students and the one responsible for transforming Oslo to what he is now. He was also responsible for turning Dia into Clawdia and her animal lab partners into his Big 4. Gorgeous Gorge became King Gorgeous Gorge and started the Glutton Empire to take over the world. He even managed to establish Gorge Town. After his Big 4 and Clawdia have failed to stop Chase and his friends, King Gorge took matters into his own hands. When it came to the final battle, he used the power of the Dark Nebula to create Devouron the Foodon Embodiment of Evil. When Oslo gave Chase and his Foodons the ability to become Palator the Foodon Embodiment of Good, he destroyed Devouron and defeated King Gorge cleansing him of evil. His Foodons are Fowligator, Sir Loin, Steak King, Multiprawns, Screwdles, Flyin' Flapjacks, Seafood Impastas, Sushi Ship, and Snack Attack.
Mia-Mia (味亜味亜) / Clawdia
Voiced by: Tamao Hayashi (Japanese); Veronica Taylor (English)
Dia is a young rocket scientist who was turned into a humanoid cat with pink fur named Clawdia by King Gorge who also transformed her animal lab partners into Gorge's Big 4. She will try to stop Chase and Chef Jack on their quest to stop Don Cook. She has often followed orders of each of the Big 4 which always ended in failure. After each of the Big 4 were returned to their original forms, Clawdia asked King Gorge to give her a chance to prove herself to him as Don Cook lent her Sir Loin and Steak King. She eventually failed and was mortally zapped by King Gorge. Chase was able to use his fried rice to restore her to Dia. She helps Chase by giving him an Eggplant Rocket needed to reach King Gorge in space. Her Foodons are Beefsteak, Boulder Broth, Sgt. Side-Order, Noodle-Ator, Applegator, Chowderheads, Bearafooda, Doughnasour, Digestor, and Pasta Vazoomin.
Kima (キマ) / Cinnamonkey
Voiced by: Shintaro Ohata (Japanese); Jimmy Zoppi (English)
Formerly a green monkey that worked with Dia, Cinnamonkey is a member of King Gorgeous Gorge's Big 4. He was the one who turned Jambalydia's granddaughter Tureen into his Glutton servant. His final campaign revolved around him invading Marmaland. When Shisk-Ka-Beast is defeated, Fruit Turtle restored Cinnamonkey to his true form. His Foodon is Shish-Ka-Beast and his name is a pun on "cinnamon."
Masa (マサ) / Cole Slawter
Voiced by: Hidenobu Kiuchi (Japanese); Eric Stuart (English)
Formerly a blue bear that worked with Dia, Cole Slawter is a member of King Gorgeous Gorge's Big 4 who specializes in seafood Foodons and plotted to turn Chase into a Glutton. That failed and Fruit Turtle reverted him back to normal after it defeated Octopoison and Squid-Vicious. His Foodons are Sizzler, Octopoison, and Squid-Vicious. His name is a pun on "coleslaw."
Chu-Nyan (チューニャン) / Rose Marinade
Voiced by: Yoko Sasaki (Japanese); Megan Hollingshead (English)
Formerly a two-tailed fox who worked with Dia, Rose Marinade's is a member of King Gorgeous Gorge's Big 4. She turned Kayla and Pie Tin into Gluttons by using Apple Pie seasoned with Glutton Magic while she was disguised as an old lady. Her Foodons are Spring Roll Chicken, Dim-Sumthin' Wild, Dim-Sumthin' Blue, Dim-Sumthin' Else, and a team of Dim-Sumthin' Specials. All of Dim-Sumthin' fuse together into Dim-Sumthin' Deluxe, a Foodon Deluxe. After Dim-Sumthin' Deluxe was defeated, a vision of King Gorge appeared in the sky and punished Rose Marinade by turning her back into a two-tailed fox.
Grill (グリル)
Voiced by: Takeshi Maeda (Japanese); Oliver Wyman (English)
Formerly a bat with a mechanical eye that worked with Dia, Grill is a cyborg who is the fourth member of King Gorgeous Gorge's Big 4 and the most powerful of the bunch. He tried to use his Butcherbot to assist King Gorgeous Gorge's world domination plot. Grill is also shown to assume a more cybernetic form in battle. After Gazmacho, Scarinara, and Gobblebot destroyed his cyborg form, he re-emerged back to his normal bat form. His Foodons are Tank 'N' Cheese, Mouse Special, Shakin' Bacon, Scarinara, and Gobblebot.
Mussels Marinara
A high-ranking member of the Glutton Empire. Mussels Marinara faced off against Chase in the preliminary round of the Floating Foodon Tournament and lost. He had Gorge's Big Four evacuated from the Glutton's ocean base with him driving their boat out of there and hasn't been seen since Chef Jack crashed Spring Chicken into the Glutton's ocean base. His Foodon is Shrimp Stompura.
Glutton Gormandizers
They serve as the foot soldiers of the Glutton Empire.

=== Other characters ===
Master Flambé
Years ago, Master Flambé was a great chef who served Princess Cupcake. When she ordered Master Flambé to make her a pizza, he got to work in perfecting one. Unfortunately, Princess Cupcake got impatient and went into town for one. This ended up depressing Master Flambé. Some years later, his Foodons Slice and Frenchy Le Toast roam in his abandoned mansion in the Flambé Forest. Clawdia had tricked Slice and Frenchy into abducting Kayla in order to attack Chase. When Master Flambé's ghost arrived, Clawdia took flight as the ghost mistook Kayla as Princess Cupcake (as both of them had the same hair style). When Kayla enjoyed Master Flambé's pizza, the ghost left to the afterlife with his Foodons.
Barb & Cue
These two young chefs were participants of the Floating Foodon Tournament and lost to Albert. Their Foodons are the Swede Demons and their names are a pun on "barbecue."
Chef Salvador
A Spanish chef that participated on the Floating Foodon Tournament and lost to Kima. His Foodon is Pilaf.
Chet
A young chef that participated in the Floating Foodon Tournament. He defeated Pie Tin, but lost to Chase. He is later revealed to have a grandfather named Crock Pop. His Foodons are Juice Man, Pound Cake, and Rap Scallion.
E. Claire
A young female chef that participated on the Floating Foodon Tournament and lost to Chase. She seems to be very popular with the boys. Her Foodon is Puddington and her name is a pun of "éclair."
Kima
A young chef in a grass skirt with a palm tree on his head. He participated in the Floating Foodon Tournament where he defeated Chef Salvador but lost to Albert. It was later revealed that he was a servant of King Hungry the Ate. His Foodons are Curry-Up, Gravyator, and Tropical Punch.
Jambalydia
An old lady who wears a pot of jambalaya on her head. She is a part of an underground network called the Hot Peppers. During one mission, she lost her granddaughter Tureen to Cinnamonkey. When collaborating with Chase to free Kayla, Pie Tin, Oslo, and Albert, Jambalydia was able to use her jambalaya trick to break the Glutton spell on Tureen. In the video game, Jambalydia was originally a Foodon and based on the Bibimbap.
Tureen
Jambalydia's blond-haired granddaughter with black horns. She sports a large steak on her shoulders and a Shabu-shabu as part of her dress. When Tureen and Jambalydia were spying on the Gluttons, Jambalydia's stench gave them away and they ended up captured. Jambalydia got away, but Tureen was turned into a Glutton by Cinnamonkey where her appearance lacked the steak and Shabu-shabu parts of her and wearing a female version of the Glutton Gormandizer outfit. When Kayla and the others were looking for Chase (who went missing after the destruction of the Glutton's ocean base) and Chef Jack (who was posing as Chef John at the time), they ended up captured by Tureen and the Glutton Gormandizers and taken to a Glutton base in the mountains. Tureen also helped Clawdia in the creation of Chowderheads. When Chase came to the rescue, Jambalydia used her powers to break the spell on Tureen. Like Jambalydia, Tureen was originally a Foodon in the "Bistro Recipe" games going by the name of "Shabu Shabu."
Crock Pop
Chet's grandfather. He runs a boot camp called Gruel Academy for Foodon chefs that Chase once went to. It was attacked by Clawdia who wanted to steal a secret scroll that contained the training secrets of the Elite Chefs held there.
Mayor Slim Rations
The Mayor of Dusty Town. He and his fellow citizens were suspicious of Chase's group when they wanted to try the secret salsa called the Salsa Especial and had them imprisoned. Following an attempted raid by the Foodon Banditos to get the salsa, Chase and the other escaped. When Mayor Slim Rations asked Sheriff Zuke Squash what would happen if anything happened to the Salsa Especial, Zuke quotes that they could make more. Mayor Rations reminded him that they can't since they lost the recipe. When Clawdia attacked the town with Doughnasour in order to steal the Salsa Especial and give it to King Gorge's scientists, Chase and the Foodon Banditos worked together to stop Clawdia and Doughnasour which resulted in Tacquito getting injured saving Mayor Rations. To show his kindness, Mayor Rations used the salsa to help Tacquito recover.
King Hungry the Ate
The king of Marmaland. He's not very bright and thought he could become a Dishwizard just by announcing it and making merchandise. King Hungry the Ate created Fruit Turtle and allowed it to go with Chase. He is known for saying "Not a problem" when it comes to a problem that isn't a big one.
Davey Gravy
Chef Jack's old friend and legendary chef who has given up fighting a long time ago. When it came to creating a Deluxe Foodon, Chef Jack asked for Davey's help into having Davey's Foodon Shrimp Daddy participate. When Clawdia and Grill attacked and destroyed his house with Tank 'n' Cheese, Shrimp Daddy protected his master. After Feastivus defeated them, Davey Gravy let Shrimp Daddy go with Chase.
Olive
A fellow Hot Peppers agent and friend of Jambalydia. When Grill abducted the real Olive, he sent a robot duplicate of her to spy on Jambalydia. Clawdia mistook the robot duplicate for the real one when she tried to prove herself to Grill.

== Media ==
=== Anime ===
==== Episodes ====
| No. | Title | Original air date |
|---|---|---|
| 1 | "Hey! Omachi!!" / "Rice to Meet You"; Transliteration: "Hei! Omachi!!" (Japanese: ヘイ! おまちぃ!!) | December 11, 2001 |
The origin of the Foodons is revealed in a flashback. In the present, King Gorge and the Glutton Empire have been making monstrous powerful Foodons. A Master Chef named Chef Jack tries to stop the creation of a Foodon named Beefsteak only to be thwarted by Clawdia. His children Chase and Kayla come looking for him and end up freeing the Foodon guru Oslo who helps Chase make his official Foodon Fried Ricer after meating his unofficial Foodons the Burnt Meatballs.
| 2 | "Pippin and Pi-tan!" / "Pie Tin Power"; Transliteration: "Pipipin to Pītandeshi!" (Japanese: ピピピンとピータンでし!) | December 18, 2001 |
Chef Jack saves Pie Tin when his parents are captured by the Glutton Empire. Clawdia lies to Pie Tin that Chase, Kayla, and Oslo are Gluttons and tricks them into fighting as the history of Power Toppings is revealed. When the truth is revealed, Pie Tin and his Foodon Sir Dumpling helps Chase and Fried Ricer fight Clawdia and her Foodon Boulder Broth.
| 3 | "Save Haoji!?" / "Mushroom With a View"; Transliteration: "Haodji o Sukue!" (Japanese: ハオヂィを救え!?) | December 25, 2001 |
When Oslo falls ill, the innkeeper directs Chase, Kayla, and Pie-Tin to where a mushroom that can help him. To make sure they fail, Clawdia creates Noodle-ator, Sergeant Side Order, and Applegator to assist her.
| 4 | "Welcome to the Forest of Ghosts" / "You Wanna Pizza Me"; Transliteration: "Yōkoso Gōsuto no Morie" (Japanese: ようこそゴーストの森へ) | January 8, 2002 |
It was mentioned in a past that Chef Flambé was trying to make the perfect pizza for Princess Cupcake. When she got tired of waiting and got one from town, Chef Flambé falls into despair. In the present, Chase, Kayla, Pie-Tin and Oslo arrive near the Flambé Forest which is haunted. The ghostly Foodons Slice and Frenchy le Toast kidnap Kayla upon being tricked by Clawdia. Chase, Pie-Tin, and Oslo must brave the Flambé Forest while contending to Slice, Frenchy Le Toast, and the Grease Blobs.
| 5 | "Open Foodon Tournament" / "Ship of Foods"; Transliteration: "Kaimaku Fūdon Tōnamento" (Japanese: 開幕フードン・トーナメント) | January 15, 2002 |
A Foodon tournament on a cruise is being held. On his part, Chase gets in where Fried Ricer defeats Mussels Marinara's Foodon Shrimp Stompura. Then on the cruise, he meets a chef named Albert who is also competing. As part of an exhibition match, Chase uses Fried Ricer and Omelet against Albert's Cowboyritto and Crab Quake.
| 6 | "Final Battle Foodon Tournament" / "We Have a Wiener"; Transliteration: "Kessen Fūdon Tōnamento" (Japanese: 決戦フードン・トーナメント) | January 22, 2002 |
As the Foodon tournament rages on, various chefs like Barb & Cue, Chet, Chef Salvador, Kima, and E. Claire compete alongsiee Chase, Pie-Tin, and Albert until it reaches the point where only Chase and Albert are left. As the finals require the use of three Foodons, Oslo helps Chase work on making a third Foodon that goes into the night as an incognito Chef Jack watches. By the day of the tournament, Chase unveils his Foodon Hot Doggone-It where it competes against Albert's Cowboyritto, Spagettabout-It, and Crab Quake.
| 7 | "The Gourmet Elite Four Arrives!"/ "Avast Ye Gluttons"; Transliteration: "Gurume Shiten'nō, sanjō!!" (Japanese: グルメ四天王、参上!!) | January 29, 2002 |
After Chase has bested Albert, it is soon discovered that some of the spectactors are Gluttons as Gorge's Big Four members Rose Marinade, Cinnamonkey, Cole Slawter, and Grill arrive. Chef Jack comes to Chase's aid when Rose Marinade unleashes the Foodon Spring Chicken. When Chase and his allies are taken to the Glutton's sea base, they work to escape and defeat Spring Chicken.
| 8 | "Curry Showdown on the South Island!" / "Battling Banana Island"; Transliteration: "Minami no Shima de, Karē Taiketsu!" (Japanese: 南の島で、カレー対決!) | February 5, 2002 |
After trying to rescue Chef Jack when he and Tofurious appear to have perished, Chase and Omelet awaken on Banana Island where they meet the chef Coco and her trainer Chef John. After a training battle where Chase manages to come out on top despite some difficulty, Chef John has them compete against each other in making a dish from ingredients from the ocean and the jungle.
| 9 | "How Does Grandmother Taste?" / "Hot Pepper Pursuit"; Transliteration: "Obā-chan no Aji wa?" (Japanese: おばあちゃんの味は?) | February 12, 2002 |
Thanks to Chef John, Chase makes it back to the main land and meets a Hot Peppers agent named Jambalydia who helps him look for his friends. He learns how her granddaughter Tureen had been turned into a Glutton by Cinnamonkey when they were caught on one of their missions. Meanwhile, Kayla, Pie-Tin, Oslo, and Albert have not been able to find Chase and/or Chef Jack and allow themselves to be captured by Tureen and the Glutton Gormandizers. They are taken to their mountain hideout where they are enslaved by Tureen and Clawdia. As Chase and Jamalydia race to find his friends with help from some Hot Peppers agents, Clawdia and Tureen create the Foodon Chowderheads who attacks the enslaved.
| 10 | "Seize It! The Ultimate Essence!!" / "Boot Camp Buffet"; Transliteration: "Tsukame! Kyūkyoku ōgi!!" (Japanese: つかめ! 究極奥義!!) | February 19, 2002 |
Chase, Kayla, Oslo, and Pie-Tin arrive at a boot camp run by Chet's grandfather Crock-Pop. Chase and Chet undergo different trainings and enforcements from guards who quote "No eat and run". Meanwhile, Clawdia hears about a secret recipe there from Cinnamonkey and attacks with the Foodon Bearafooda.
| 11 | "Tears of a Hidden Foodon" / "El Taco Grande"; Transliteration: "Hagure Fūdon no Namida" (Japanese: はぐれフードンの涙) | February 26, 2002 |
In the town of Dusty Town, Chase, Kayla, Oslo, and Pie-Tin find the local Foodons working for the people. When they learn about the secret salsa, Mayor Slim Rations and Sheriff Zuke Squash have them locked up to see if they are targeting it or not. The town is then attacked by the Foodon Banditos led by Tacquito, Fry Slinger, and Chili Dog as Chase's group escapes from them. It was also revealed in a discussion between Mayor Slim Rations and Sheriff Zuke Squash that they can't make more of the secret salsa as they lost the recipe. Tacquito learns that Chase isn't bad after he saves one of the Foodons during a scuffle. Wanting to obtain the secret salsa, Clawdia plans to make a Foodon and give the salsa over to the Glutton Empire's scientists to reverse-engineer. Chase's group and the Foodon Banditos must work together to save Dusty Town from Clawdia's Doughnasour.
| 12 | "Tropical Food God?" / "Cinamonkey's Secret"; Transliteration: "Toropikārana Shoku Kami-sama?" (Japanese: トロピカーラな食神様?) | March 5, 2002 |
Chase's group arrive in Marmaland where they reunite with Kima. They meet his boss King Hungry the Ate who claims to be a Dish Wizard. He is also in possession of a Five-Star Meal Ticket that can make a Five-Star Foodon that is stronger than normal Foodons. Things get worse when Cinnamonkey attacks with the Foodon Shish-Ka-Beast. When Shish-Ka-Beast proves to be too much for the Foodons of King Hungry the Ate's men, Chase's group must help King Hungry the Ate put together a Five-Star Foodon leading to the creation of Fruit Turtle.
| 13 | "Attack! Four Heavenly King Masa" / "Slaw and Order"; Transliteration: "Shūgeki! Shiten'nō Masa!!" (Japanese: 襲撃! 四天王マサ!!) | March 12, 2002 |
After Pie-Tin persuades King Hungry the Ate to allow them to keep Fruit Turtle, Chase's group head to their next location. Meanwhile, King Gorge hears about what happened to Cinnamonkey after Cole Slawter tries to cover for him. King Gorge appoints Cole Slawter to avenge Cinnamonkey. He and Clawdia attack a seaside town with the help of the Foodon Sizzler and managed to defeat the Foodons used by Chef John and Coco. Chase's group must work to rescue Chef John and Coco.
| 14 | "Confornation! Four Heavenly King Masa" / "The Comeback Squid"; Transliteration: "Taiketsu! Shiten'nō Masa!!" (Japanese: 対決! 四天王マサ!!) | March 19, 2002 |
A giant octopus and a giant squid have been menacing a fishing village. Unfortunately, Fried Ricer has a fear of octopuses and squids. When Cole Slawter and Clawdia catch the giant octopus and giant squid in order to convert them into Foodons, Chef John leads the others into helping Fried Ricer get over his fear of octopuses and squids. When it comes to the day of the challenge, Clawdia helps Cole Slawter create Octopoison and Squid Vicious. Fried Ricer struggles to fight them as Chase tries to get Fruit Turtle to come out.
| 15 | "Food God's Forgotten" / "Swine Dining"; Transliteration: "Shokushin no Wasuremono" (Japanese: 食神の忘れ物) | March 26, 2002 |
In the Candies Mountains, Chase's group comes across the town of Hamsterdam where its people have come down with a case of swine flu. This is caused by a large amount of Pork Bullies. Chase works with Coco to find the ingredients needed to cure the sick of the swine flu as well as help Hamsterdam contend with the Pork Bullies even when they combine into Slop Suey.
| 16 | "Burger Squadron of Love and Justice" / "Attack of the Burger Brigade"; Transliteration: "Ai to Seigi no Bāgā Sentai" (Japanese: 愛と正義のバーガー戦隊) | April 9, 2002 |
Arriving at a village, Chase's group puts on a Foodon Festival. Meanwhile, Rose Marinade dispatches Clawdia to deal with them as she brings along some Glutton Gormandizers and the Burger Brigade members Ground Chuck, Jamburger, Cheeseburger, Veggie-Myte, and Medium Rare. Amidst the fight, Chase is snatched by the motorcycle of Well-Done and is saved by Chef John who learns that the Burger Brigade have been enslaved by Clawdia.
| 17 | "Final Battle!! Ramen Showdown" / "Use Your Noodle"; Transliteration: "Kessen!! Rāmen Taiketsu" (Japanese: 決戦!! ラーメン対決) | April 16, 2002 |
Following the Burger Brigade being freed from Clawdia's control, Kayla, Pie-Tin, and Oslo have been taken captive. A disguised Rose Marinade feeds Kayla and Pie-Tin an apple pie spike with magic that turns them into Glutton Gormandizers. They assist the Glutton Gormandizers in oppressing the locals and also enslaved Albert when he comes to their defense. In the nick of time, Chase arrives and frees Oslo and Albert. Rose Marinade puts him in a noodle soup contest against Kayla and Pie-Tin.
| 18 | "Disappearance!? Tropicana" / "Assault and Pepper"; Transliteration: "Shōmetsu!? Toropikāna" (Japanese: 消滅!? トロピカーラ) | April 23, 2002 |
Now that Kayla and Pie-Tine had been freed from Rose Marinade's spell, she unleashes an army of dim-sum Foodons consisting of Dim-Sumthin' Wild, Dim-Sumthin' Blue, Dim-Sumthin' Else, and an army of Dim-Sumthin' Special. Amidst the fight, Chef John is unmasked to be Chef Jack. When Chase brings out Fruit Turtle with advice from his father on how to officially bring it out, he goes out cold as Rose Marinade has her dim-sum Foodons combine into Dim-Sum Deluxe. A Deluxe Foodon is stronger than a Five-Star Foodon as it starts to overwhelm Fruit Turtle. Chef Jack knows of a purple pepper Power Topping that could help, but Chase must take the risk on using it due to the side effects it can do to a Foodon.
| 19 | "Shock Combination! Tensing!!" / "License to Grill"; Transliteration: "Shōgeki Gattai! Tenshingu!!" (Japanese: 衝撃合体! テンシング!!) | April 30, 2002 |
Following Rose Marinade's defeat and Fruit Turtle's sacrifice, Chase is too shaken up to do any cooking. Chef Jack takes the group to his old friend Davey Gravy in order to make use of his Shrimp Daddy to make a Deluxe Foodon of their own that involves Sir Dumpling, Shrimp Daddy, a Dim-Sumthin' Special that was claimed offscreen, and another Foodon. As Chase helps out around Davey Gravy's cabin and Chef Jack trains Albert to make a Delux Foodon, Kayla, Pie-Tin, and Coco have a theory that the Burnt Meatballs might be the final component. Meanwhile, King Gorge sends Grill and Clawdia to attack Davey Gravy which they do with the help of the Foodon Tank-N-Cheese.
| 20 | "A Dangerous Blunder!?" / "To Catch a Beef"; Transliteration: "Makkuro n Kikiippatsu!?" (Japanese: まっくろん危機一髪!?) | May 7, 2002 |
Chase's group arrive at a town where they reunite with Jambalydia. Now that the Burnt Meatballs are a component of Feastivus, Grill lends two of his Foodons to Clawdia in a plot to abduct the Burnt Meatballs. She starts with the shapeshifting Foodon Mouse Special who tries to pose as Albert only to lose in a contest to see who is the real Albert by making on omelet on the moving swing. With the jig up, Clawdia unleashes Shakin' Bacon to attack. Though Jambalydia recognizes Shakin' Bacon as her old Foodon Porkie Pie who was stolen by the Gluttons years ago.
| 21 | "Super Sour Spy!?" / "Hot and Spy'cy"; Transliteration: "Supai de dai Suppai!?" (Japanese: スパイで大すっぱい!?) | May 21, 2002 |
Jambalydia takes Chase's group to meet her fellow Hot Peppersagent Olive. Wanting to get back on Grill's good side, Clawdia creates the Foodons Digestor and Pasta Vazoomin' to help her capture Olive. She is unaware that the Glutton Gormandizers working for Grill already did the job and that the Olive that Jambalydia was meeting is actually a robot.
| 22 | "Guardian Robot, Activate" / "You Go Grill" Pt. 1 Transliteration: "Gādianrobo Shidō" (Japanese: ガーディアンロボ始動) | May 28, 2002 |
Chase's group goes after Clawdia after she and Pasta Vazoomin have made off with Fried Ricer. Grill gives Clawdia another chance to take out Chase as she unleashes a brainwashed Fried Ricer on him. Using some wisdom from his father, Chase forms Feastivus enough to break the mind-control helmet on Fried Ricer. This leads to Grill remotely setting Pasta Vazoomin to self-destruct as Chase saves Clawdia from the blast. Returning to Grill, Clawdia gets a confirmation that Grill setting Past Vazoomin to self-destruct was the price for her latest failure and has her locked up. Chase's group arrives in Metabolis City where the meet the technician Foodon Gazpacho who shows them Metabolis City's high-tech features with comical results and warns them that Grill and his enslaved Foodons Scarinara and Gobblebot are about to bring Butcherbot online.
| 23 | "Machine Chef Grill!!" / "You Go Grill" Pt. 2 Transliteration: "Kikai Ryōri Hito Guriru!!" (Japanese: 機械料理人グリル!!) | June 4, 2002 |
Continuing from the last episode, Butcherbot has been brought online as Grill uses it in his latest plot. While Gazmacho tries to get Scarinara and Gobblebot to switch sides, Grill assumes his second form to go on the attack. Now Chase's group must shut down Butcherbot, rescue an imprisoned Clawdia, and defeat Grill.
| 24 | "Rush! Don Cook Castle!!" / "A Whole Lot at Steak"; Transliteration: "Totsunyū! Don Kukku Shiro!!" (Japanese: 突入!ドン・クック城!!) | June 11, 2002 |
Now that Grill has been defeated, Chase's group make their way to King Gorge's castle. King Gorge allows Clawdia to have a chance at a promotion as he loans them two of his Foodons to deal with them. In the first attack, Clawdia unleashes Sir Loin to attack which led to Spaghettabout-It and Crab Quake being defeated. After Sir Loin is defeated by the remaining Foodons, Clawdia unleashes Steak King on them. Displeased with the outcome, King Gorge zaps Clawdia causing Chase to work on healing her.
| 25 | "Final Battle! Don Cook" / "Chase in Space"; Transliteration: "Kessen!! Don Kukku" (Japanese: 決戦!! ドン・クック) | June 18, 2002 |
With Clawdia regressed back to a girl named Dia, Chase's group evacuates King Gorge's castle as he heads into outer space. Once in outer space, King Gorge unleashes an army of Multiprawns, Seafood Impastas, and Flying Flapjacks on the world. As those who Chase befriended throughout the world fight this Foodon army, Dia and the true animal forms of King Gorge's Big Four create an eggplant rocket ship that Chase and Pie-Tin take into outer space with an assisted launch from Chef Jack, Gazmacho, Scarinara, and Gobblebot controlling Butcherbot. Once in outer space, Chase and Pie-Tin form Feastivus to fight King Gorge's Foodons Sushi Ship and Snack Attack.
| 26 | "Magical Cuisine" / "A Dish Better Served Cold"; Transliteration: "Magokoro no Ryōri" (Japanese: まごころの料理) | June 25, 2002 |
Using the power of the Dark Nebula, King Gorge forms around him Devouron: the Foodon Embodiment of Evil who easily defeats Feastivus. Chef Jack and Oslo lead the world into donating their energy so that Chase and the Foodons that form Feastivus can combine to form Palator: the Foodon Embodiment of Good. Both Foodon Embodiments face off against each other to determine the fate of the world.

== Reception ==
Neil Genzlinger of Food and Wine magazine wrote that it was "an exceedingly odd" and that "The show makes Iron Chef seem tame."
