= Sonic Soldier Borgman =

Japanese anime television series

- 超音戦士ボーグマン
- Genre: Action, Science fiction
- Director: Hiroshi Negishi
- Series composition: Hideki Sonoda
- Character designer: Michitaka Kikuchi
- Music: Hiromoto Tobisawa
- Country of origin: Japan
- Original language: Japanese
- No. of episodes: 35

Production
- Producers: Tōru Horikoshi (NTV); Minoru Ōno (Yomiko); Kōji Yoritsune (Toho); Hiroshi Katō (Ashi Productions)
- Planning and production: Nippon Television
- Production companies: Yomiko Advertising; Toho Co., Ltd.; Ashi Productions

Original release
- Network: NTV
- Release: April 13 – December 21, 1988

Related
- Anime film

Borgman: The Last Battle
- Directed by: Hiroshi Negishi
- Produced by: Kōji Yoritsune; Yasushi Shibahara; Yukinao Shimoji
- Written by: Nobuaki Kishima
- Music by: Hiromoto Tobisawa
- Studio: Ashi Productions
- Released: September 1, 1989
- Runtime: 60 minutes
- Anime film

Borgman: Lover's Rain
- Directed by: Kiyoshi Murayama
- Produced by: Kōji Yoritsune
- Written by: Hideki Sonoda
- Music by: Hiromoto Tobisawa
- Studio: Ashi Productions
- Released: December 1, 1990
- Runtime: 35 minutes
- Original video animation

Sonic Soldier Borgman II: New Century 2058
- Directed by: Kiyoshi Murayama
- Produced by: Machiu Hattori; Akifumi Shirogawa; Yukinao Shimoji
- Written by: Kiyoshi Murayama
- Music by: Hiromoto Tobisawa
- Studio: Studio Giants
- Released: October 1, 1993 – December 1, 1993
- Runtime: 30 minutes (each)
- Episodes: 3

Sonic Soldier Borgman (超音戦士ボーグマン, Chōon Senshi Bōguman), or simply Borgman (ボーグマン, Bōguman; also spelled as Borg-Man), is a futuristic science fiction hero anime television series produced by Yomiko Advertising, Toho and Ashi Productions. It was directed by Hiroshi Negishi, with Hideki Sonoda handling series scripts, Kia Asamiya designing the characters and Hiromoto Tobisawa composing the music. The TV series aired on Nippon TV and its affiliate stations on Wednesday evenings from April 13 to December 21, 1988, and was followed up by a video game, two movies, and an OVA miniseries released in 1988, 1989, 1990 and 1993, respectively.

== Plot ==
In 1999, four meteorites, the "demon stones," fell on Tokyo, destroying the capital city. Thirty-one years later, in 2030, invaders from another dimension, calling themselves demons, suddenly attacked Megalo City, a new city built on Tokyo Bay. Their goal is to complete the magic square with the fifth demon stone, revive the Demon King, and conquer the world. Just when everyone thought that the human race had no choice but to perish, a group of young people wearing battle suits called "Baltectors" (derived from "Battle Protectors") rose up and challenged GIL, an army of demons and crime syndicate, to a battle. They were the cyborg warriors known as Borgman.

== Characters ==
=== Sonic Team ===
(Japan) Ryō Hibiki (響 リョウ, Hibiki Ryō)
Voiced by: Yasunori Matsumoto
The protagonist of the series. He is 16 years old, born on September 22, 2013. He is 177 cm tall, weighs 65 kg, and was born in Chiba. He is a passionate man with a strong sense of justice and loves motorcycles. He participated in the Borgman Project dreaming of becoming an astronaut, but the project was aborted when he was attacked by a demon, so he has been working as an apprentice Japanese language teacher at the CySonic Academy since then.
When fighting as Borgman, he wears a blue Baltector for speed and close combat and his weapon is a Battle Machine Gun. His artificial intelligence and self-aware motorcycle Road/Super Thunder is his exclusive machine and partner, and is his last resort special weapon.
In Borgman: The Last Battle, the de facto conclusion of the series, which was later released as an OVA, he went to the U.S. to fulfill his dream and became a staff member of NASA.
(United States) Chuck Sweager (チャック・スェーガー, Chakku Swēgā)
Voiced by: Kazuhiko Inoue, Shinya Ōtaki (episodes 24-26)
He is 17 years old, born in the U.S. on October 20, 2012. He is 185 cm tall and weighs 80 kg. His family consists of his parents and younger sister. He is a physical education teacher at CySonic Academy. Although he is often seen by others as a smug lady-killer, like Ryō, he also has a strong sense of justice and is a sincere and good-natured young man. He and Ryō have been best friends since they were trainees, and they are highly capable as a team. He possesses superhuman strength that does not match his slender frame, but he has a weakness: he hates natto.
When fighting as Borgman, he wears a green Baltector for wide-area attacks. His weapon of choice is a Battle Launcher. In the early half of the series, he used to ride a modified buggy, but later on, he switches to a combat vehicle, Beaglehead, and also falls in love with Miki of Phantom Swat (see below).
In The Last Battle, he and Miki work for the Megalo City Police Department, where they investigate a number of mysterious incidents. In the sequel OVA Sonic Soldier Borgman II: New Century 2058, he is the director of the Katsura Research Institute, where he commands the second generation of Borgman who fight the revived demons.
(United States) Anise Farm (アニス・ファーム, Anisu Fāmu)
Voiced by: Yoshino Takamori
She is 16 years old, born in the U.S. on February 5, 2014. She is 164 cm tall and weighs 47 kg. Her family consists of her parents and her brother Anton, who lives in Los Angeles. She is the lone woman of the Borgman trio and loves children. She is also the daughter of a major restaurant chain, but unlike Ryō and Chuck, she came to Japan as an aspiring singer and encountered a demon attack while touring the space block, and when she was mortally wounded, the Borgman system was urgently installed in her by Memory, saving her life (the Borgman system incorporated into her was not originally intended for her exclusive use, but was a miraculous match). As a result, her power is inferior to that of Ryō and Chuck. She is usually a music and math teacher at CySonic Academy.
When fighting as Borgman, she wears a red Baltector for electronic warfare. Her weapon of choice is a Battle Saucer. She often pilots Gun Warrior, a combat robot, to compensate for her lack of power, and either rides with the other two mechs or borrows Chuck's buggy for transportation.
In The Last Battle, she accompanies Ryō to the U.S., where she runs a cafe stand near the space center where he works, but a minor fight causes her to "run away" to Megalo City herself.
(United Kingdom) Memory Jeanne (メモリー・ジーン, Memorī Jīn)
Voiced by: Masako Katsuki
She is 22 years old, born on November 19, 2007. She is the central figure in the Borgman Project and a female scientific genius. Her family consists of her parents back home and her older brother. She lost her younger brother Reminisce in an accident during an experiment.
She commands and supports Borgman in the state-of-the-art base she had built underground at the CySonic Academy in preparation for the battle against demons. She is always calm and collected, but in reality she is a cheerful and gentle soul, and is usually respected by teachers and students as the principal of the CySonic Academy. Her trademark is her glasses, which she has been wearing since the early stages of her career.

=== Other characters ===
(Japan) Miki Katsura (桂 美姫, Katsura Miki)
Voiced by: Naoko Matsui
The daughter of the Katsura Conglomerate and leader of the World Police and Phantom Swat, an anti-demon special forces unit. She is of a male lineage, with parents, two older brothers, and a younger brother. She is competitive and determined. She wears a special protector in battle, but because she is a flesh-and-blood human being, her fighting ability is inferior to that of Borgman. Toward the end of the story, she falls in love with Chuck.
(United States) Charlie Burger (チャーリー・バーガー, Chārī Bāgā)
Voiced by: Yuzuru Fujimoto
Chief of the Megalo City Police Department (since Megalo City is an immigrant town, there appears to be no nationality regulations for public office). He is involved in cases involving demons. Toward the end of the story, he learns Borgman's true identity and becomes their good friend.
(Japan) Shinji Oda (織田 シンジ, Oda Shinji)
Voiced by: Akari Hibino
Age 10. He is a curious troublemaker who is a student at CySonic Academy. He seems to like Molly, but he bullies her. He is not very good at studying and did not know about the abandoned old Tokyo or the background of the construction of Megalo City. He is the first among the students to learn the true identity of Borgman. His dream is to become an astronaut in the future.
(United States) Molly Ranguald (モーリー・ラングォルド, Mōrī Rangworudo)
Voiced by: Chie Kōjiro
Age 9. Her family consists of her parents. She is a student at CySonic Academy and everyone's idol. She is a kind girl who loves flowers and comforts Anise when she is depressed. She also loves Ryō.
(Japan) Randō Gōda (郷田 乱童, Gōda Randō)
Voiced by: Toshiharu Sakurai
A student at CySonic Academy, he is a violent troublemaker. He beats the reserved Tōru mercilessly at every opportunity, but he becomes quiet when Molly gets angry with him.
(Japan) Tōru Momoki (桃木 亨, Momoki Tōru)
Voiced by: Kumiko Watanabe
A student at CySonic Academy, he is very timid and reserved.
(United Kingdom) Fritz K. Liddell (フリッツ・K・リデル, Furitsu Kei Rideru)
Voiced by: Kenyu Horiuchi
A scientist who was a colleague of Memory and Mesh. Because of his love for Memory, he was opposed to the Borgman Project because he did not want to put her in danger. In the end, however, he was moved by Memory's determination, and in episode 4, he was fatally wounded defending her and the children of the school from the attack of Dust Gead, who directly attacked the CySonic Academy, and entrusted her with the data for the Sonic System as he drew his last breath.

=== GIL Crime Syndicate ===
An evil organization that worships the Demon King and seeks to rule the real world with the power of demons. It is composed of former human cadres enchanted by demons and demon warriors under their command. It has no particular army of low-ranking soldiers like combatants, and each operation is carried out by one of the cadres and the demons under their command. It is unclear whether the name of the organization itself was known to the Borgman side, as it was referred to simply as "demons."

(United Kingdom) Gilbert Mesh (ギルバート・メッシュ, Girubāto Messhu)
Voiced by: Banjō Ginga
The head of GIL. He is 30 years old. He used to be one of the scientists involved in the Borgman Project, but was fascinated by the power of demons and formed GIL. At the end of the story, he himself becomes a sacrifice for the revival of the Demon King, but he still has his own personality, and in the final episode, he calls himself the demon king Mesh and begins to take action to change the whole world into a demon world. However, through a plan to reverse the transfer system devised by Memory, he was disintegrated into particle form and thrown into subspace, where he died completely, along with his demon king body. He has been obsessed with Memory ever since he was a human, and has repeatedly persuaded her to join his organization.
(N/A) Dust Gead (ダストジード, Dasto Jīdo)
Voiced by: Koichi Yamadera
Age unknown. He is the strongest demon warrior, and is a proud perfectionist. He wears a black Baltector and controls the demons under his command to challenge Borgman in battle. His true identity is a combat Borgman (the original owner of this Borgman's body is unknown) implanted with the brain of Reminisce Jeanne, Memory's brother who died in an accident, and whose memory has been erased by Mesh. He uses a sword and a whip as weapons, and can shoot red energy bullets from his hands. He can also deploy a "GIL Field" that interferes with Borgman's Baltectors and Sonic Weapon transfers.
(N/A) Felmina (フェルミナ, Ferumina)
Voiced by: Yōko Matsuoka
Age unknown. One of the three priests of the GIL association, she is the red-haired lone woman of the three. She commands the demon humanoids. She used to be a genius doctor, but was expelled from the scientific society for advocating the theory of total body modification.
(N/A) Wongott (ウォンゴット, Wongotto)
Voiced by: Yuzuru Fujimoto
Age unknown. One of the three priests, he commands the demon machines. Part of his head is mechanized. He used to be a genius inventor.
(N/A) Cerberus (ケルベルス, Keruberusu)
Voiced by: Yuu Shimaka
Age unknown. He is one of the three priests who command the demon beasts. He has another face on his head. He used to be a top-notch scientist.
(N/A) Vader (ヴェーダ, Vēda)
Voiced by: Kōzō Shioya
Age unknown. An elder demon, he has a humorous personality. He always has a peculiar laugh. He is said to be useless as he only complains bitterly about failed operations, but in fact he is an agent of the Demon King.
Demons (妖魔, Yōma)
They are divided into three armies: humanoid-type demon humanoids, animal-type demon beasts, and demon machines in the form of weapons and vehicles, and act in the dark as GIL's sharpshooters. They are upgraded by the demon factory, the GIL Triangle, fusing into demon machine humanoids, demon machine beasts, and demon beast humanoids, which are combinations of two types, and they can merge into the Triple Monster. From episode 26, even more powerful demon generals appear.

== Release ==
In 2004, both the Lover's Rain and the Last Battle movies were released on DVD in the U.S. by ADV (now Section23).

== Other media ==
In 1988, a video game was produced based on the series for the Master System. This game was only released as a tie-in for the Japanese market, and for the US and European territories it was marketed as Cyborg Hunter, with references to Borgman removed.
