= Tails (Sonic the Hedgehog) =

Video game character

Miles "Tails" Prower
- Sonic the Hedgehog character
- Classic (left) and Modern (right) Tails designs
- First game: Sonic the Hedgehog 2 (1992)
- Created by: Yasushi Yamaguchi
- Designed by: Yasushi Yamaguchi; Yuji Uekawa
- Voiced by: English: Christopher Stephen Welch (1993) (AoStH); Chris Turner (1996) ("Sonic Christmas Blast"); Bradley Pierce (1993–1994) (SatAM); Lainie Frasier (1999); Amy Palant (2003–2010); Kate Higgins (2010–2013, 2021); Colleen O'Shaughnessey (2014–present); Alicyn Packard (2022; Sonic Drone Home); Ashleigh Ball (Sonic Prime); Japanese: Hekiru Shiina (1996); Kazuki Hayashi (1998); Atsuki Murata (2000–2001); Ryō Hirohashi (2003–present); Takuto Yoshinaga (Classic Tails, 2011)

In-universe information
- Full name: Miles Prower
- Nickname: Tails
- Species: Fox
- Gender: Male
- Occupation: Inventor

Tails (Japanese: テイルス, Hepburn: Teirusu), real name Miles Prower (マイルス・パウアー, Mairusu Pauā), is a character created by the Japanese game designer Yasushi Yamaguchi. He is a major character in Sega's Sonic the Hedgehog franchise. Tails is an anthropomorphic fox with two tails (hence his nickname) who serves as one of Sonic's main sidekicks. His full name, Miles Prower, is a pun on "miles per hour".

Tails first appeared in the 1992 video game Sonic the Hedgehog 2. Yamaguchi designed Tails as part of an internal Sega Technical Institute competition to create a character to serve as a sidekick to Sonic. He wanted to name the character Miles Prower, but Sega of America staff resisted. They suggested the name Tails along with a backstory to explain it, which convinced Yamaguchi to acquiesce. Sega compromised by presenting Miles Prower as the character's name and Tails as his nickname.

Tails is characterized as a good-natured mechanical genius and skilled pilot, possessing the ability to fly by spinning his tails similarly to the rotor blades on a helicopter rotor. Most media depicts him as having been bullied for his intelligence and twin tails until he befriended Sonic; he looks up to Sonic as a role model and desires to be like him. Outside the Sonic platform games, Tails has starred in Tails and the Music Maker (1994) for the Sega Pico, and Tails Adventure and Tails' Skypatrol (both 1995) for the Game Gear. Atsuki Murata and Ryō Hirohashi have voiced Tails in Japan, while Colleen O'Shaughnessey has provided his English voice since 2014. O'Shaughnessey reprised her role for the live-action film franchise distributed by Paramount Pictures.

Video game journalists consider Tails one of the most iconic video game sidekicks. His likeness has been featured in merchandise and most Sonic the Hedgehog adaptations, including comic books, television series, and films.

== Concept and creation ==
Line art of Tails by Yasushi Yamaguchi

Tails was conceived by Sonic Team artist and zone designer Yasushi Yamaguchi for Sonic the Hedgehog 2 (1992) as a sidekick to Sonic and a second playable character that would allow siblings to play together. Programmer Yuji Naka suggested the second character be endearing, similar to the kitsune from Urusei Yatsura, and beginner-oriented rather than Sonic's rival. An internal contest was held to determine the new character; while Yamaguchi's design, a fox named "Miles Prower" (a pun on "miles per hour"), was the winning design, Sega of America felt the name would not sell and suggested "Tails" as an alternative. Marketing director Al Nilsen developed a character backstory to convince the developers to make the change; they compromised by making Tails his nickname. Sega Technical Institute, the development studio of Sonic the Hedgehog 2, wanted the character to appeal to Japanese audiences, and Yamaguchi gave him two tails—inspired by the Phantasy Star character Myau—to make the design more impactful. He based Sonic and Tails' dynamic on that of the Dragon Ball characters Piccolo and Gohan.

The character debuted as Sonic's tag-along partner in the franchise's second game and has remained an important character since. However, the character's uniqueness was not established until Sonic the Hedgehog 3 (1994), when players were given the power to control his flying (the AI would make Tails fly when he would move off-screen).

=== Voice portrayal ===
Throughout the years, Tails has been voiced by several different voice actors. In the Japanese dubs, Tails was voiced by Hekiru Shiina in 1996, Kazuki Hayashi in 1998, Atsuki Murata from 2000 to 2001 and by Ryō Hirohashi since 2003.

Tails was voiced by Christopher Stephen Welch in Adventures of Sonic the Hedgehog, voicing the character for the original 65 episodes; in the Christmas special, he is voiced by Chris Turner. He was voiced by Bradley Pierce in Sonic the Hedgehog and by Lainie Frasier in Sonic the Hedgehog: The Movie. Corey Bringas voiced Tails in Sonic Adventure.

Beginning in 2003 with the Sonic X anime series, he was voiced by Amy Palant who would later take over the role in the video games, starting with Shadow the Hedgehog in 2005. Palant was replaced by Kate Higgins in 2010, beginning with Sonic Free Riders. She continued to voice the character until 2013, where her final role as Tails was in Mario & Sonic at the Sochi 2014 Olympic Winter Games, though she reprised her role in 2021 for the Sonic Colors: Rise of the Wisps miniseries. Since 2014, Tails has been voiced by Colleen O'Shaughnessey, including in the television series Sonic Boom and the live-action films. In the 2022 Sonic short film, Sonic Drone Home, Tails is voiced by Alicyn Packard. In the Netflix series Sonic Prime, Tails is voiced by Ashleigh Ball.

== Appearances ==
=== In video games ===
Tails debuted in November 1992 with the release of Sonic the Hedgehog 2, playing the part of Sonic's sidekick. He was a playable character from the second controller and could be chosen as player one for the main game, though he did not possess the ability to fly. He made his second appearance on the Game Gear/Master System-controlled game Sonic Chaos (1993), where the player could control Tails and the first time the player could control his flight. Tails also made a minor cameo in Sonic CD for the Sega CD, appearing in the debug mode unlock screen. Tails makes an appearance alongside Sonic in the little-known arcade game SegaSonic Popcorn Shop, a Japanese arcade game which also dispenses popcorn after playing the game.

Tails made his third major appearance in the 1994 game Sonic the Hedgehog 3, with the ability to pick up Sonic and use his tails to fly him to other areas rotating his tails like a helicopter. He also gained the ability to swim underwater, something Sonic has never been able to do. This is also the first time the player could control Tails' flight in a Sega Genesis game. Tails has also starred in games without Sonic, such as Tails' Skypatrol (1995), which is a side-scrolling score attack-like game for the Game Gear released exclusively in Japan. This was followed by Tails Adventure later the same year, which is a Metroid-esque platformer with RPG elements. Tails is also the star of Tails and the Music Maker for the Sega Pico, which released in North American in Oct. 1994.

In later games, Tails had roles that require unique modes of play including Sonic Adventure, where he appears as one of the six playable characters. His gameplay is based around standard platforming stages, but the goal of each stage is to race against Sonic or Eggman to get to the goal first. In Sonic Adventure 2, he is featured in third-person-shooting segments, seated in his "Cyclone" mech. These stages, along with Dr. Eggman's shooting levels in the same game, were very similar to the E-102 Gamma levels of Sonic Adventure. In Sonic Adventure, he was given a theme song "Believe In Myself", of which another version appeared in Sonic Adventure 2.

Tails also appeared either as a playable character or in a supporting role in many later Sonic titles and still often resumes his role flying other characters around, such as in Sonic Heroes, where Tails appears on Team Sonic as their flight-type character, being capable of carrying both Sonic and Knuckles the Echidna. He is the third character the player unlocks in Sonic Chronicles: The Dark Brotherhood, where he acts as a team medic.

Tails appears in Sonic Unleashed, where he helps Sonic restore the shattered planet, largely by flying Sonic from continent to continent in the game. He also takes a supporting role in Sonic and the Black Knight, portrayed as a local blacksmith who helps players craft goods from the items Sonic collects. Tails appears as a playable character in all of the Mario & Sonic titles, and is a main character in the story modes. In Winter Olympic Games for the Nintendo DS, Tails can be unlocked in the by beating him on a Ski jumping mission. In London 2012 Olympic Games for the Nintendo 3DS, Tails is a character in the "Heroes" category, the others being Mario, Sonic, and Luigi, and they try to stop Bowser and Eggman's plan to foil the Olympics. In Rio 2016 Olympic Games for the 3DS, Tails appears as a supporting character. In Tokyo 2020 Olympic Games for the Nintendo Switch, he and Luigi try to free Mario, Sonic, Toad, Bowser, and Eggman inside a device known as Tokyo '64, but is taken by Bowser Jr., and they try to take the device back. At the end of the story mode, they free their friends, and Tails participates at the 100 meters, alongside Mario, Sonic, Luigi, Bowser, Eggman, Yoshi, and Shadow. Tails appears in Sega Superstars Tennis, Sonic & Sega All-Stars Racing, and Transformed. He also appears in Sonic Colors as a non-playable character.

Tails celebrates Sonic's birthday along with his friends by setting up a party in Sonic Generations, but when the Time Eater appears, it warps them through various time holes, sending Tails to Green Hill. After Sonic frees him, Tails meets his classic counterpart (Classic Tails) and concludes that they were traveling through time and space. They accompany both Sonics throughout the game, later discovering that Eggman and Robotnik are controlling the Time Eater. Both Classic and Modern Tails, along with all of Sonic's friends, help motivate the 2 Sonics to defeat the Time Eater.

The feature to play as Tails was added to the 2011 enhanced port of Sonic CD. He later appeared as a co-op character in the Sonic the Hedgehog 4: Episode II. Tails was added as a playable character in the enhanced port of Sonic the Hedgehog (1991) released in 2013 for mobile devices, and also allowed players to opt for the "Sonic and Tails" mode.

He is a playable character in the 2017 video game Sonic Mania Plus, playing like his older incarnations along with Sonic, Knuckles, Mighty, and Ray. He also appears as a playable character in the Sonic Boom-themed games Rise of Lyric, Shattered Crystal and Fire & Ice. Tails appears as one of 12 playable characters in the 2019 kart racing game Team Sonic Racing as well.

Tails was also featured in the Sonic the Hedgehog Level Pack of the toys-to-life game Lego Dimensions. He is playable if the player uses the Tornado as Sonic to fly around the world. In the story mode for the Sonic level, titled "Sonic Dimensions", Tails assists Sonic using the Tornado and his technological knowledge. In the hub world, Tails has a side quest for the player to aid him in disabling all of Eggman's roboticists. Tails is a supporting non-playable character in Sonic Forces, finding Classic Sonic and joining up with the resistance in opposing Dr. Eggman and Infinite.

In Sonic Frontiers, Tails along with Amy and Knuckles are trapped in Cyberspace, with Sonic releasing their digital form from cages and they help him find the Chaos Emeralds and set them free. While having a moment with Sonic, Tails expresses his self-doubt and belief that he is a burden to Sonic who is always rescuing him during crises, and that his helpfulness is wildly inconsistent, but Sonic comforts him by reminding Tails of his achievements and abilities and needing help sometimes is part of growing up, this strengthens Tails' resolve to go solo for a while and become a hero in his own right.

He also appears as a downloadable Mii Fighter costume in the crossover fighting games Super Smash Bros. for Nintendo 3DS and Wii U and Ultimate, as well as being featured as a Spirit in the latter. Tails appears as an unlockable playable character in Super Monkey Ball Banana Mania and Super Monkey Ball Banana Rumble. He appears as a sidekick in Fortnite Battle Royale.

=== In other media ===
In print, Tails is a supporting character in the Archie-produced Sonic the Hedgehog comic series, the Fleetway-produced Sonic the Comic and the IDW-produced Sonic the Hedgehog comic series. Tails is also a main character in the intercompany crossover, DC X Sonic the Hedgehog. In the series, he partners with Cyborg during the team up with the Justice League to defeat Darkseid in Chaos Crisis and eventually against Eggmana and the Legion of Doom in Metal Legion. Tails also dons a suit of armor resembling Cyborg's components, and becomes a reserve member of the Teen Titans.

Tails is a supporting character in the animated series Adventures of Sonic the Hedgehog, Sonic the Hedgehog, Sonic X and Sonic Boom, as well as the 1996 Sonic the Hedgehog film. Tails also makes a guest appearance in the OK K.O.! Let's Be Heroes episode "Let's Meet Sonic". Tails, and alternative versions of himself, appear in Sonic Prime, all of them voiced by Ashleigh Ball, after Sonic shatters the Paradox Prism and the universe, creating alternative dimensions in the process. Several alternative Tails are created, one being Nine, who never met Sonic and was bullied throughout his life. He became bitter and isolated as a result, and created seven artificial tails for himself as weapons. He is initially distrustful of Sonic but eventually warms up to him. Other versions are the feral and seemingly unintelligent Mangey and the pirate mechanic Sails.

==== Film series ====
Tails appears in the 2020 Sonic the Hedgehog film during a mid-credits sequence, emerging from a ring portal on Earth in search of Sonic.

Tails is featured as a main character in the sequel, Sonic the Hedgehog 2, the logo of which features a yellow "2" with two tails attached in homage to the character. He is voiced by Colleen O'Shaughnessey, reprising her role from the games. In the film, Tails was shunned on his home planet for having two tails but grew to idolize Sonic after witnessing his bravery when facing off against Dr. Robotnik. He travels to the planet to warn Sonic about Knuckles hunting him down to locate the Master Emerald and teams up with his hero to find the Emerald first, though he's initially afraid to do so, claiming he's not "a field guy." He still assists Sonic with his flight and various gadgets throughout their journey, culminating in them teaming up with Knuckles to stop Robotnik from conquering the universe. After they succeed, they agree to safeguard Master Emerald as they live together with Sonic's adoptive family, the Wachowskis.

Tails also appears in the first episode of Knuckles, voiced again by O'Shaughnessey.

In the third installment of the Sonic film series, Sonic the Hedgehog 3, Tails, once again voiced by O'Shaughnessey, continues to be the "gadget guy" of Sonic's team as they try to stop Shadow the Hedgehog, providing crucial technical help, such as holograms, to aid Sonic.

Tails will appear in the 2027 film Sonic the Hedgehog 4, with O'Shaughnessey reprising her role.

== Critical reception ==
Tails has received widely positive reception. He was awarded "Best New Character" in Electronic Gaming Monthly's 1992 video game awards, stating "Not only is he as cute as Sonic, but he serves a major purpose in the game." IGN editor Lucas M. Thompson listed Tails as one of the Sonic the Hedgehog characters who should be in Super Smash Bros. Brawl, citing his importance in the series and his abilities. Tails is remembered for helping Sonic 2 become the highest-selling game for Genesis by allowing a second player to join the game.

Maximum PC listed him as their third-greatest sidekick, describing him as the "Yin to Sonic's Yang." Maxim listed him as the eighth-most-underrated sidekick. Ranking him as the sixth-greatest, Mashable stated that Tails embodies the definition of a sidekick. Sonic and Tails were together ranked as ninth-greatest video game duo as unlike most Sonic characters, Tails has received consistently positive opinions from the Sonic fanbase over the years. Official Nintendo Magazine listed him as the second-best Sonic character, comparing him to Luigi from the Mario franchise. Tails was rated the third-most-popular character in the franchise, behind Sonic and Shadow, in an official poll from Sega in 2009. Similarly, Tails was ranked fourth in another character popularity poll by Dengeki Online in 2025.

Not all assessments have been positive. John Davison, in a 1998 Electronic Gaming Monthly editorial, compared Tails to Scrappy-Doo, citing his "disgustingly cute, stupid-looking fluffy twin tails, corny name, [and] big soppy eyes", adding that "No one asked for him, no one likes him, yet he turned up anyway and now we're stuck with him". GamesRadar+ listed him as number one on their 2008 list of "Cutesy Characters We Want to Beat the Crap Out of", believing that his character deteriorated from a likable, quiet sidekick to an annoying, overly talkative "tech nerd" predisposed to pretentiously complicated dialogue in later games. IGN editor Levi Buchanan argued that the favorable response to Tails as well as Knuckles resulted in Sega overextending the cast starting with Sonic Adventure, adding characters who deviated from the series' core gameplay and diluting focus on Sonic himself.

== See also ==
- Foxes in popular culture, films and literature
