= Cyborg Hunter =

1988 video game

- Developer: Sega
- Publishers: WW: Sega; NA: Activision
- Designers: Hirohiko Yoneda; Yasushi Yamaguchi; Kamereon Aki
- Platform: Master System
- Release: JP: December 1, 1988; NA: January 1989; EU: July 1989
- Genre: Action
- Mode: Single-player

Cyborg Hunter (超音戦士ボーグマン) is a 1988 action video game developed and published by Sega for the Sega Master System. (Note: Published by Activision in North America)

== Plot ==
Set in the year 2242, the player controls Paladin, the galaxy's toughest bounty hunter. Cyborgs are about to take complete control of the universe under the direction of Vipron, their evil leader. The player is sent to the cyborg fortress to get rid of all the chief cyborgs in each of the seven areas. They are not alone in this mission. They also have Adina, their contact back at headquarters. The player must follow her instructions carefully to survive.

== Gameplay ==
Screen layout showing 3D radar, map and action panes.

The game screen is divided into three sections. This includes a first-person view of the map, in which the player can see objects that are coming their way. There are two types of objects: red objects indicate the lower cyborgs, while white ones indicate the chief cyborgs. Next to it is a map of the area, the player's life and psycho power count. Below these is the main action screen, which is a side-on perspective of Paladin negotiating the environment and taking on enemies.

In each of these seven areas, there are several floors which can be reached via the elevator. At the beginning of the game, the player's only weapons are their fists, but weapons can be collected throughout each area, which include a psycho punch, a ray gun, a light gun, and bombs. Power-ups like extra life and psycho power can also be collected. If the player uses the psycho punch or psycho gun, their psycho power gets depleted, and when it is empty, they must stock up on some more. They can also get shields that will protect them from laser beams, and jet engines so that the player can fly over hazards. In some areas, they defeat a boss which leaves an ID card, which the player can use to access other areas of the fortress. The equipment menu is accessed using the A or B buttons on the second controller.

The story is advanced by simple cutscenes showing Adina talking, accompanied by text below. Adina also provides gameplay tips at pre-determined points in the game.

== Development ==
The game was originally developed as a title called Chōon Senshi Borgman (超音戦士ボーグマン), and was based on an animated TV series of the same name. For non-Japanese territories the game was marketed as Cyborg Hunter. The Japanese version of the game has a storyline more resemblant of the anime series. The original game was designed by Hirohiko Yoneda who would later work on Shenmue, and Yasushi Yamaguchi who is also credited for design on Sonic the Hedgehog 2. Music was composed by Nav and Key.

== Reception ==
Cyborg Hunter was labelled as unoriginal, but still "addictive and challenging". Computer and Video Games magazine rated the game at 76%.
Game Freaks 365 called the game easy as the player can "waste the majority of cyborgs in a few hits", and lacking in creativity. The reviewer gave the game 6/10. Retrospective reviews have compared the game to Metroid.
