= Colleen O'Shaughnessey =

American voice actress (born 1971)

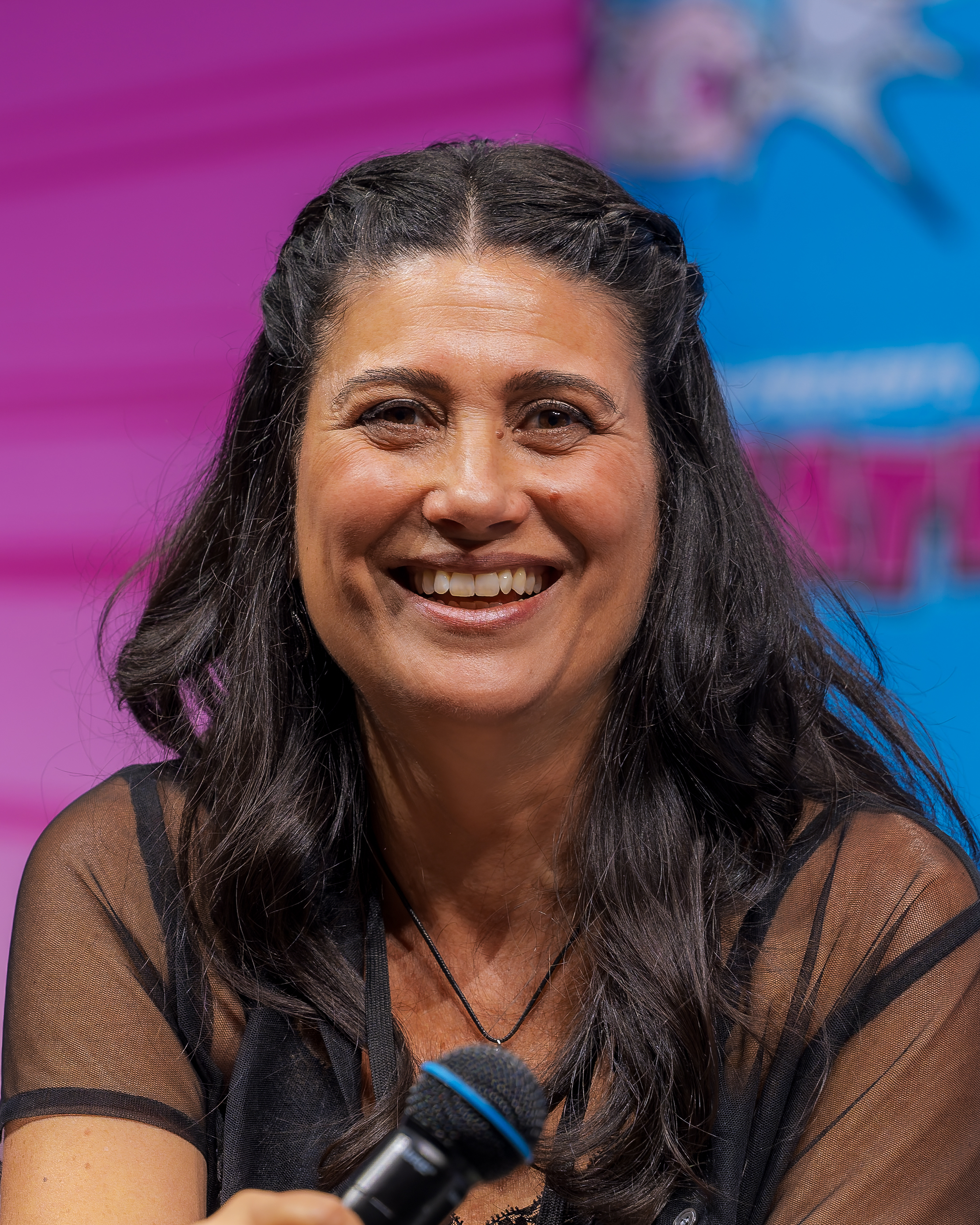
- O'Shaughnessey at Animate! Orlando in 2026
- Born: Colleen Ann O'Shaughnessey; September 15, 1971 (age 55); Grand Rapids, Michigan, U.S.
- Other names: Olivia O'Connor; Olivia Charles; Maggie O'Connor; Colleen A. Villard
- Education: University of Michigan
- Occupation: Voice actress
- Years active: 1990–present
- Spouse: Jason Villard (m. 2000)
- Children: 2
- Website: colleenoshaughnessey.co

Colleen Ann O'Shaughnessey (born September 15, 1971) is an American voice actress. She is known for providing the voice of Jazz Fenton in Danny Phantom and of Wasp in The Avengers: Earth's Mightiest Heroes. Since 2010, O'Shaughnessey has voiced various characters in the Sonic the Hedgehog franchise, including Tails, a role she reprised in the Sonic the Hedgehog film series. In addition, O'Shaugnessey has provided voices to English-language dubs of anime and video game series, such as Sora Takenouchi in Digimon: Digital Monsters and Ino Yamanaka and Konohamaru Sarutobi in Naruto.

== Early life ==
O'Shaughnessey was born on September 15, 1971, to Peggy (née Varani) and Mike O’Shaughnessey in Grand Rapids, Michigan. She earned a B.F.A. in musical theatre from the University of Michigan.

== Career ==
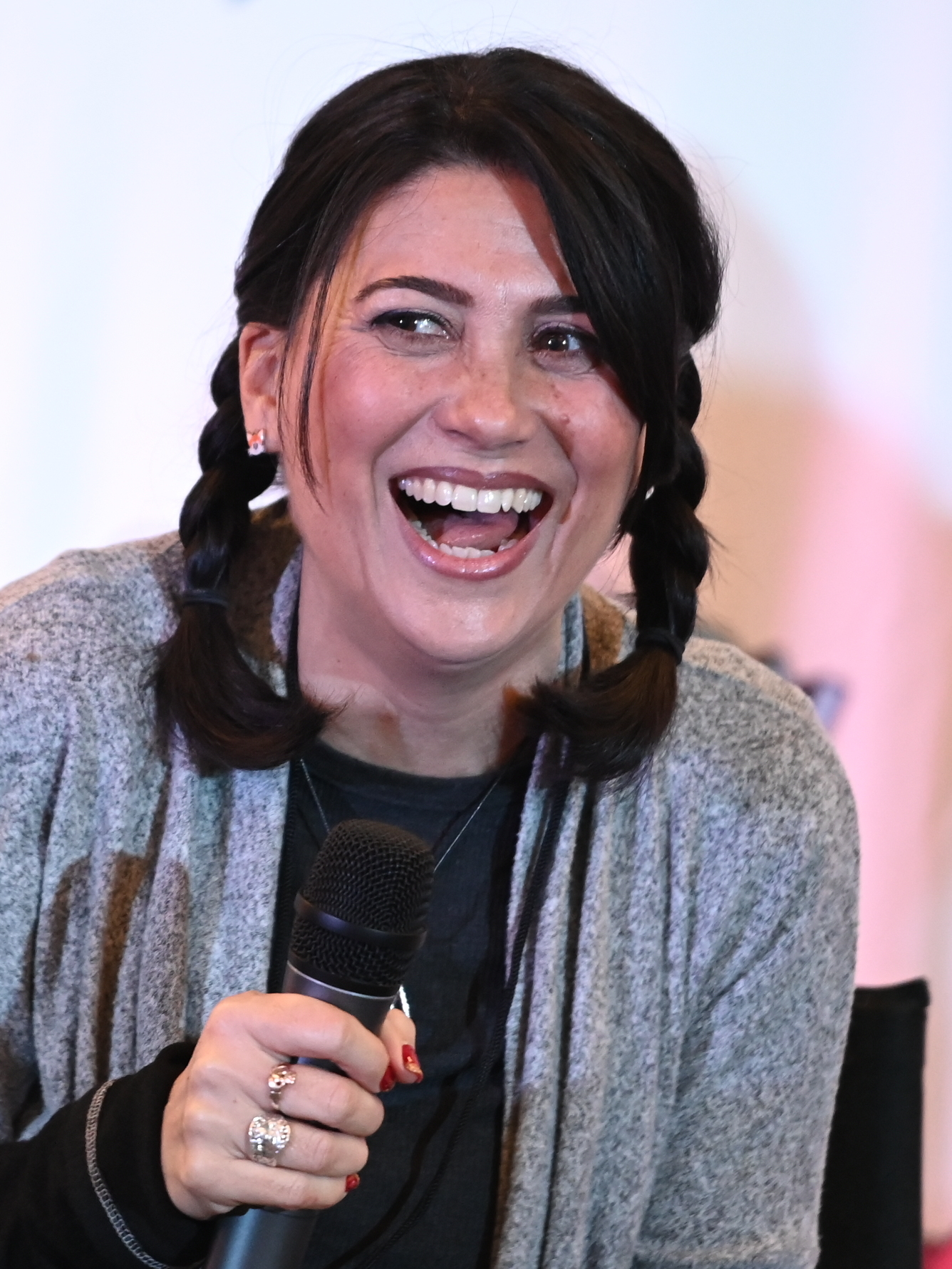
O'Shaughnessey at GalaxyCon, 2022

O'Shaughnessey is perhaps best known for her roles as Sora Takenouchi from the first and second seasons of Digimon (her first major voiceover role), Jazz Fenton in Danny Phantom, Ino Yamanaka and Konohamaru Sarutobi in Naruto, Nelliel Tu Odelschwanck in Bleach, and Janet Van Dyne/Wasp in The Avengers: Earth's Mightiest Heroes.

She has also worked in the video game industry, where she voiced Genis Sage in Tales of Symphonia and KOS-MOS in Xenosaga Episode II: Jenseits von Gut und Böse. Since 2010 and 2014 respectively, she has been the voice of Charmy Bee and Tails in the Sonic the Hedgehog series.

O'Shaughnessey reprised her role of Sora Takenouchi for the Digimon Adventure tri. movie series and Digimon Adventure: Last Evolution Kizuna.

== Personal life ==
In November 2000, O'Shaughnessey married Jason Villard. As of 2018, they reside in Los Angeles, California, with their two children.

== Filmography ==
=== Anime ===
- B-Daman Crossfire – Sumi Inaba
- Battle B-Daman – Assado
- Black Jack – Karen Aramis
- Bleach – Nelliel Tu Odelschwanck, Loly Aivirrne, Michiru Ogawa, Yuichi Shibata, Kyoko Haida
- Bleach: Thousand-Year Blood War – Nelliel Tu Odelschwanck, Loly Aivirrne
- Blue Exorcist – Cram School Girl C (Ep. 7); Ghost Boy (Ep. 12)
- Boruto: Naruto Next Generations – Chocho Akimichi, Hanabi Hyūga, Ino Yamanaka
- Bungou Stray Dogs – Margaret Mitchell
- Chainsmoker Cat – Yakuko Etsushimaru
- Digimon: Digital Monsters – Sora Takenouchi
- Digimon Data Squad – Yoshino "Yoshi" Fujieda
- Digimon Fusion – Angie Hinomoto, Monitamon
- Dinozaurs (2000) – Kira (Ep. 16)
- Drifting Dragons – Vanabelle
- Duel Masters – Mimi Tasogare (Seasons 2–3 only)
- Glitter Force – Kelsey / Glitter Sunny, Shadow Sunny (Episode 38)
- Initial D First Stage – Saori (Ep. 12–13, Tokyopop Dub)
- K – Anna Kushina, Sakura Asama, Claudia Weissman
- Kekkaishi – Yurina Kanda, Yomi Kasuga
- Mars Daybreak – Enora Taft
- Marvel Future Avengers – F.R.I.D.A.Y., Black Mamba
- Mirage of Blaze – Saori
- Mobile Suit Gundam: The Origin – Artesia Som Deikun / Sayla Mass
- Mobile Suit Gundam Unicorn – Additional Voices
- Monster – Wim Knaup
- My Next Life as a Villainess: All Routes Lead to Doom! – Mary Hunt
- Naruto – Ino Yamanaka, Konohamaru Sarutobi
- Naruto: Shippuden – Ino Yamanaka, Konohamaru Sarutobi, Hanabi Hyuga (Ep. 166), Kaori, Furofuki (Ep. 186)
- Nier: Automata Ver1.1a – Commander
- Nodame Cantabile – Kiyora Miki
- Overman King Gainer – Sara Kodama
- Sailor Moon – Thetis (Ep. 12, Viz dub), Mie Sayama (Ep. 52, Viz dub), U-Ndoukai (Ep. 117, Viz dub)
- Slayers Revolution – Pokota
- Slayers Evolution–R – Pokota
- Somali and the Forest Spirit – Praline
- Sword Art Online II – Endou, Verdandi (Ep. 17)
- Tenkai Knights – Ms. Finwick, Additional Voices
- The Orbital Children – Hiroshi Tanegashima
- Tokyo Pig – Dizzie Lizzie
- Vampire Knight series – Seiren, Additional Voices
- Vandread – Seiron
- Zatch Bell! – Suzy Mizuno, Robnos

=== Animation ===
- The Adventures of Kid Danger (2018) – Menu Board
- The Avengers: Earth's Mightiest Heroes (2010–2013) – Wasp / Janet Van Dyne, Vapor, Valkyrie, Cassie Lang, Female Kang
- Danny Phantom – Jazz Fenton, Mikey, Flight Attendant, Girl 1, Girl 3, Girl, Alarm Voice, Spandex-Wearing Student, Nerd Girl (1), Walla 2, Vid, Additional Voices
- Doc McStuffins – Pickles, Agnes Mom, Townsperson
- Freedom Fighters: The Ray – Mrs. Terrill
- Hanazuki: Full of Treasures – Little Dreamer, Red Hemka, Yellow Hemka
- Homestuck: The Animated Pilot – Jade Harley
- Important Things with Demetri Martin – Female Bystander
- Jonah Hex: Motion Comics – Additional Voices
- The Kids from Room 402 – Polly, Mary–Ellen, Don
- Lego Scooby–Doo: Knight Time Terror – Wanda Grimsley
- The Loud House – Petey Wimple, Blonde Hair Girl
- The Life and Times of Juniper Lee – Jody Irwin, Rachel Irwin, Hammerette #3, Mrs. Fallon, Mrs. Irwin, Slim, Teen #2, Attendant, Mall Manager #1, Cleota, Intercom, Citizen, Astronaut, Margie, Marvin, Photographer, Co-Worker #2, Additional Voices
- OK K.O.! Let's Be Heroes – Tails ("Let’s Meet Sonic")
- Pinkfong Wonderstar – Pinkfong
- Random! Cartoons – Tiffany, Mom, Kit, Some Kid, Little Girl
- The Replacements – The Lise, Swifty
- Sonic Boom – Tails
- South Park – Karen McCormick
- Special Agent Oso – Jake's Mom ("License To Clean"), Jade's Mom ("On Her Cousin's Special Salad"), Nadia's Mom ("For Sleepy Eyes Only")
- Static Shock – Nightingale / Gail
- What's New, Scooby-Doo? – Celia Clyde, Jingle, Galana's Friends
- What's with Andy? – Lori Mackney (2001–2002)

=== Film ===
- Axel: The Biggest Little Hero (2013) – Jono
- Bleach: Memories of Nobody (2006) – Store Keeper
- Boruto: Naruto the Movie (2015) – Ino Yamanaka
- Digimon: The Movie – Sora Takenouchi, Male Student ("Four Years Later" segment)
- Digimon: Revenge of Diaboromon – Sora Takenouchi
- Digimon Adventure tri. – Sora Takenouchi, Mrs. Mochizuki, Tapirmon
- Digimon Adventure: Last Evolution Kizuna – Sora Takenouchi
- Digimon Adventure (standalone dub) – Sora Takenouchi
- Digimon Adventure: Our War Game! (standalone dub) – Sora Takenouchi
- Digimon Adventure 02: Digimon Hurricane Touchdown!! / Transcendent Evolution! The Golden Digimentals (standalone dub) – Sora Takenouchi
- Horton Hears a Who! (2008) – Angela Glummox, Additional Voices
- Justice League Dark – Black Orchid
- The Last: Naruto the Movie – Hanabi Hyuga, Ino Yamanaka, Konohamaru Sarutobi
- Ladybug & Cat Noir: The Movie – Emilie Agreste
- Monsters University – Additional Voices
- Murder and Cocktails – Sarah
- Naruto Shippuden the Movie: The Will of Fire – Ino Yamanaka
- The Orbital Children – Hiroshi Tanegashima
- The Painting – Harlequin
- Okko's Inn – Suzuki
- Party Central – Mom
- Ponyo – Karen, Additional Voices
- Road to Ninja: Naruto the Movie – Ino Yamanaka
- Sailor Moon Super S: The Movie – Perle / Sailor Moon Super S Plus: Ami's First Love – Bonnon
- Sonic the Hedgehog film series (2020–present) – Tails
- Spirited Away – Additional Voices
- Toy Story 3 (2010) – Additional Voices
- Violet Evergarden: Eternity and the Auto Memory Doll – Isabella York
- Violet Evergarden: The Movie – Additional Cast
- Winx Club: The Mystery of the Abyss (2014) – Omnia

=== Video games ===
- Alpha Protocol – Madison Saint James
- Bleach series – Nelliel Tu Odelschwanck
- Cookie Run: Kingdom – Pastry Cookie, Tails Cookie
- Digimon World Data Squad – Yoshino Fujieda, Runaway A, Runaway B
- Dirge of Cerberus: Final Fantasy VII – Incidental Characters
- Disney Infinity: Marvel Super Heroes – Wasp
- Disney Infinity 3.0 – Additional Voices
- Disney Princess: Palace Pets – Summer
- EverQuest II – Emissary Millia, redeemable traitor (human), Alanaramal Zaste, Freya Ora, Maida Tudors, Bartender, Innkeeper Female Good & Evil recording1 (Kerran), Raban, Yanari Cyellan, Nyla Diggs
- Fallout 4 – Sylvia Cooper
- Final Fantasy VII Remake – Additional Voices
- Final Fantasy XIII – Cocoon Inhabitants
- Final Fantasy XIII-2 – Additional Voices
- Fire Emblem: Three Houses – Kronya, Monica von Ochs
- Fire Emblem Warriors: Three Hopes – Kronya, Monica von Ochs
- Fire Emblem Engage – Jean
- Guild Wars 2 – Female Asura Pact Commander
- Hearthstone – Additional Voices
- Hitman – Valerie St. Clair, Additional Voices
- La Pucelle: Tactics – Alouette
- Lego Dimensions – Miles "Tails" Prower
- Lightning Returns: Final Fantasy XIII – Additional Voices
- Lost Judgment – Kuniko
- Marvel Heroes – Julia Carpenter / Arachne, Wasp / Janet Van Dyne
- Marvel Rivals – Mantis
- Metal Gear Solid 4: Guns of the Patriots – Soldiers
- Naruto series – Ino Yamanaka, Konohamaru, Tsunami, Hanabi Hyuga
- Psychonauts – Nils Lutefisk and Crystal Flowers Snagrash
- Persona 5 Strikers – Akane Hasegawa
- Red Ninja: End of Honor – Additional voices
- Rogue Galaxy – Mark Pocacchio
- Shenmue III – Additional Cast
- Sonic the Hedgehog franchise – Tails (2014–present), Charmy Bee (2010–present)
  - Boom (video games) – Tails
    - Fire & Ice
    - Rise of Lyric
    - Shattered Crystal
    - Sonic Dash 2
  - Colors – Charmy (Nintendo DS version only; credited as Maggie O'Connor)
  - Forces – Tails, Charmy, Additional Voices
  - Frontiers – Tails
  - Mario & Sonic at the Rio 2016 Olympic Games – Tails
  - Team Sonic Racing – Tails
- The Legend of Heroes: Trails Through Daybreak – Citizens, Holo Core voices
- South Park
  - South Park: The Stick of Truth – The New Kid's Mom (Kelly), Karen McCormick
  - South Park: The Fractured but Whole – The New Kid’s Mom (Kelly), Karen McCormick
  - South Park: Snow Day! – The New Kid's Mom (Kelly)
- Spider-Man – Woman with missing purse on rooftop
- SpongeBob SquarePants Featuring Nicktoons: Globs of Doom – Jazz Fenton
- Star Wars: The Old Republic – Additional Voices
- Tales of Symphonia – Genis Sage
- The Legend of Heroes: Trails Through Daybreak II – Citizens, HoloCore
- Towa and the Guardians of the Sacred Tree – Akagane, Gaku (young child), Rylaku
- Tower of Fantasy – Huma
- Valkyria Chronicles – Alicia Melchiott
- Valkyria Chronicles II – Alicia Gunther
- WildStar – Drusera, Professor Goldbough, Yuria, Cassian Female, Aurine Female
- Xenosaga Episode II: Jenseits von Gut und Böse – KOS-MOS
- Zatch Bell! Mamodo Fury – Suzy Mizuno, Robnos

=== Documentary ===
- Adventures in Voice Acting – Herself
- I Know That Voice – Herself

=== Podcast ===
| Year | Title | Role | Notes |
|---|---|---|---|
| 2026 | Sonic the Hedgehog Presents: The Chaotix Casefiles | Charmy Bee and Tails | |

=== Other ===
- Knuckles – Tails
- The Oogieloves in the Big Balloon Adventure
- Violetta – Camila's singing voice (English dubbing of Argentine telenovela)

| Preceded by Kate Higgins | English voice of Miles "Tails" Prower (video games); 2014–present | Succeeded by Incumbent |
| Preceded by Amy Palant | English voice of Miles "Tails" Prower (broadcast TV series); 2014–present | Succeeded by Incumbent |
