= Lainie Frasier =

American actress (born 1956 or 1957)

- Born: 1956 or 1957 (age 68–69)
- Other names: Lainie Ferrante
- Occupation: Actress
- Years active: 1985–present

Lainie Frasier (born 1956 or 1957), sometimes credited as Lainie Ferrante, is an American actress, known primarily for voice acting.

== Career ==
Frasier attended the University of Texas, where she received a BFA in theater in 1979. Through college, she did voice-over work, and worked on advertisements and audio production. She started teaching voice acting around 1990, and later started her own teaching business.

Frasier has done a few voices in anime, but is best known for voicing Raindevila in Wedding Peach. She has also made a few appearances in live action film and television productions.

== Filmography ==
=== Live action ===
- Austin Stories - Mom (ep.11)
- Black Vomit - Astrid
- Confessions of a Serial Killer - Stranded Motorist
- Friday Night Lights - Mrs. Laura Davidson
- Rain - Mrs. Whiteny

=== Anime ===
- Devil Lady - Harpy, Chiyoko's Grandmother
- Final Fantasy: Unlimited - Chocobaba
- King of Bandit Jing - Mama Stout
- Legend of Crystania: The Motion Picture - Irim
- Legend of Crystania: The Chaos Ring - Irim
- MAPS (1994 OVA) - Mother
- Mazinkaiser - Baron Kaiser
- New Fist of the North Star - Yura
- Rurouni Kenshin Trust And Beyond - Landlady
- Sonic the Hedgehog: The Movie - Miles "Tails" Prower
- Wedding Peach - Raindevila
- Wedding Peach DX - Spider Woman

=== Video games ===
- DC Universe Online - Granny Goodness
- Metroid Prime 3: Corruption - Aurora Unit 242
- Pirate101 - Additional Voices
- Wizard101

Preceded by none	English voice of Miles "Tails" Prower (anime); 1999	Succeeded by Amy Palant
