= Amy Palant =

American voice actress

- Occupations: Voice actress, singer
- Years active: 1999–present
- Musical career
- Genres: Indie folk
- Instruments: Vocals
- Formerly of: The Shells

Amy Palant is an American voice actress and singer, best known for her role as Miles "Tails" Prower in the anime Sonic X (2003–2005) and in Sonic the Hedgehog video games from 2005 to 2010.

== Career ==
Palant studied voice acting at Edge Studio, under founder David Goldberg. She worked with the studio as a performer and voice coach up until the early-2010s. She also worked with 4Kids Entertainment from 2003 to 2012, as well as Central Park Media and DuArt Film and Video.

As a recording artist, Palant has performed with numerous bands, and co-founded the New York-based folk band Bombshell – now known as the Shells – in 2005. She left the band in 2006.

== Filmography ==
=== Animation ===
- Becca's Bunch – Mayor Ladymaus
- Fighting Foodons – Kayla
- Magical DoReMi – Dorie Goodwyn, Dodo, David, Keith
- Mew Mew Power – Cassandra
- Midori Days – Makie, Marin, Yuma Takiguchi
- One Piece – Miss Valentine (4Kids Dub)
- Pokémon – Various Characters (2002-2010)
- Shaman King – Milly of The Lily Five
- Shura no Toki – Princess Yuki
- Sonic X – Miles "Tails" Prower
- Tai Chi Chasers – Terra

=== Films ===
- Pokémon: Giratina and the Sky Warrior – Shaymin, Layla
- Psychic School Wars – Arisa Shimizu, Kenji Seki (young)

=== Video games ===
- Sonic the Hedgehog (series) – Miles "Tails" Prower (2005–2010)
  - Mario & Sonic at the Olympic Games (series)
    - Beijing 2008
    - Vancouver 2010
  - Other SEGA games
    - All-Stars Racing
    - Superstars Tennis
  - Shadow the Hedgehog
  - Sonic Storybooks (series)
    - Black Knight – Tails / Blacksmith
    - Secret Rings – Tails / Ali Baba
  - Sonic Riders (series)
    - Riders 1
    - Zero Gravity
  - Sonic Rivals (series)
    - Rivals 1
    - Rivals 2
  - Sonic Rush (series)
    - Rush 1
    - Rush Adventure
  - Sonic the Hedgehog – Tails, Anna
  - Unleashed
- Poképark Wii: Pikachu's Adventure – Shaymin

Preceded by	English voice of Miles "Tails" Prower (video games); 2005–10	Succeeded by Kate Higgins
Preceded by	English voice of Miles "Tails" Prower (broadcast TV series); 2003–06	Succeeded by Colleen Villard
Preceded by Lainie Frasier	English voice of Miles "Tails" Prower (anime); 2003–06	Succeeded by TBA
