= Tails Adventure =

1995 video game

- Developer: Aspect
- Publisher: Sega
- Director: Katsuhiro Hasegawa
- Producer: Katsuhiro Hasegawa
- Artists: Nobuhiko Honda; Shinichi Higashi
- Composer: Kojiro Mikusa
- Series: Sonic the Hedgehog
- Platform: Game Gear
- Release: JP: September 22, 1995; EU: October 6, 1995; NA: 1995
- Genres: Platform, Metroidvania
- Mode: Single-player

Tails Adventure (Note: Teirusu Adobenchā (テイルスアドベンチャー) in Japanese. The game is referred to as Tails Adventures on the title screen and on the Japanese packaging.) is a 1995 platform game developed by Aspect and published by Sega for the Game Gear. The game stars Tails from the Sonic the Hedgehog series in a solo adventure, as he collects an array of items to help him explore Cocoa Island and defeat the enemies inhabiting it. The gameplay is more slow-paced than other Sonic games, with Tails only capable of walking and flying at a moderate speed. The stages are explored in a non-linear fashion, with newly collected items opening up pathways in previous areas.

Along with Tails' Skypatrol, the game is one of two on the Game Gear to star Tails in a solo role. Tails Adventure received mixed reviews, with critics finding the game unoriginal and too slow-paced compared to previous Sonic offerings. Retrospective reviews commended the game for trying something different and compared the gameplay to the Metroid series, but disliked what they felt was repetitive backtracking. Tails Adventure has been included in Sonic game compilations, and was re-released on the Nintendo 3DS in 2013.

== Gameplay ==
Tails, equipped with bombs, looks upwards at an enemy

Contrary to the classic speedy gameplay in the Sonic the Hedgehog series, Tails Adventure is a slow-paced platformer with an emphasis on exploration. The player controls Tails in a story set before he befriended Sonic, as he adventures to save Cocoa Island from an invasion of the Kukku Army. He cannot run, but only walk at a steady pace. The player explores twelve non-linear stages, collecting new items and abilities to open up new pathways in previous stages. A total of 26 items can be collected, including some to defeat enemies and others to aid in exploration. Along with using items, Tails can fly for a short period of time. His fly duration can be extended by locating Chaos Emeralds. Rings are collected as a form of health, and unlike other Sonic games, only a few rings are lost when touching a hazard. This gameplay has been compared to Metroidvania games.

Tails finds several different kinds of gadgets on his adventures. Some of these items are weapons used to defeat enemies, like bombs and hammers. Some items aid in exploration, such as a small robot which Tails can control to scout ahead and squeeze into tight spaces. Tails can only carry four tools when entering a stage. Only one item can be equipped at a time, the player must pause the game to change items. If the player finds that they cannot advance because they require another item, they must find a stage exit, swap items, and re-enter the stage from the beginning.

== Development and release ==
Tails Adventure was developed for the Game Gear by Aspect and published by Sega. Along with Tails' Skypatrol, it is one of two Sonic the Hedgehog games on the Game Gear to star Tails. The soundtrack was composed by Kojiro Mikusa, who also wrote music for Sonic Blast. Tails Adventure was released for the Game Gear on September 22, 1995, in Japan. It was released in Europe on October 6, 1995, and in North America the same year. The game was re-released through Sonic Adventure DX: Director's Cut in 2003 as an unlockable bonus game, in Sonic Gems Collection in 2005, and Sonic Origins Plus in 2023. It was also re-released for the Nintendo 3DS's Virtual Console in Japan on April 3, 2013, followed by an international release on June 27, 2013.

== Reception ==
Contemporary review scores

Review scores
Publication	Score
Electronic Gaming Monthly	7/10, 7.5/10, 8/10, 8.5/10
Famitsu	6/10, 3/10, 5/10, 5/10
Mean Machines Sega	80%

Critics felt Tails Adventure was too similar to other platform games, and its slow pace made it weaker than other Sonic offerings. Famitsu felt it lacked any surprising elements and was disappointed it was much more standard than other Sonic games. Mean Machines Sega agreed, calling it "decidedly unoriginal", but believed secret areas and a steep learning curve made it interesting enough to continue playing. Electronic Gaming Monthly compared the game to Super Mario platforming titles and also enjoyed finding hidden areas. Critics generally liked the graphics and controls, however the graphics did receive some criticism. Mean Machines Sega felt some of the background textures repeated too much, Famitsu criticized the screen's narrow field of vision, and Electronic Gaming Monthly noted some screen blur issues.

In retrospective reviews, both Nintendo World Report and Nintendo Life felt the game was a significant contrast to the other Sonic Game Gear games. They believed the game exchanged the speed of previous series installments for exploratory gameplay more akin to the Metroid series and Gargoyle's Quest (1990). USgamer recommended the game, calling it a departure from the Sonic series, and the closest a Sonic game ever felt to a Nintendo franchise. Nintendo Life enjoyed the variety of gadgets and level designs, but criticized the dark environments and repeating background textures. Along with Nintendo World Report, they criticized the game's poor handling of inventory. The journalists would often explore large portions of a level only to learn they were missing a necessary item, and would need to restart the stage. The game's presence in Sonic Gems Collection was welcomed as a modern convenience, but was criticized along with other Game Gear inclusions for graphical glitches and poor emulation. Some felt the portable games were merely supplemental to the more substantial games in the collection and dismissed them. 1UP.com perceived Tails Adventure and Tails Skypatrol's inclusion in the compilation as Sega "scraping the bottom of the barrel," describing them as "nigh-unplayable portable titles from an era best forgotten."
