= Music of the Streets of Rage series =

Video game discography

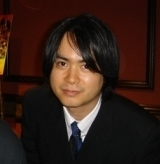
Composer Yuzo Koshiro (2007)

The music of the Streets of Rage series of beat 'em up games, released in the early 1990s, was primarily produced by Yuzo Koshiro.

The soundtracks mainly consist of electronic dance music encompassing genres such as electro, house, techno, hardcore, jungle, ambient, breakbeat, gabber, noise, and trance. The music was produced using the Yamaha FM-synth sound chips of the Sega Mega Drive video game console (YM2612) and NEC PC-88 computer (YM2608), along with Koshiro's own audio programming language "Music Love", a modified version of the PC-88's Music Macro Language (MML).

The soundtracks have been cited as being ahead of their time and as some of the best in video games. The soundtracks have influenced a range of chiptune, electronica, grime and dubstep musicians through to the present day, including artists such as Ikonika, BT, Labrinth, Martyn, Joker, Darkstar, Childish Gambino, and Danger.

== Streets of Rage ==
Bare Knuckle Original Soundtrack

Soundtrack album by Yuzo Koshiro
- Released: September 21, 1991
- Genres: Breakbeat, Chiptune, D&B, Electro, Electronic, Funk, Game, Hip-hop, House, Industrial, Jazz, R&B, Techno, Urban
- Length: 60:14
- Label: GMO Records / Alfa Records
- Producers: Yuzo Koshiro; Kyoji Kato

When Streets of Rage's development began in 1990, Koshiro was influenced by electronic dance music, or club music, specifically techno and house music, and wanted to introduce those sounds to chiptune and video game music. Many tracks also have a warm, Caribbean quality, and the soundtrack shows the influence of contemporary R&B and hip hop music; Yuzo Koshiro said that he was influenced by black music, which was growing together with house and techno, so he "naturally began to think about taking them all in". He was particularly influenced by "the swinging rhythms that characterized breakbeats", especially the "ground beat" (used in Ippu-Do's "Sail On" in 1983, Soul II Soul's "Keep On Movin'" in 1988, and Enigma's "Sadeness" in 1989) which inspired "The Street of Rage" title track. Other artists who influenced him include Black Box, Maxi Priest and Caron Wheeler around the time of composing.

The soundtracks for the Streets of Rage series were composed using then outdated PC-88 hardware alongside Koshiro's own original audio programming language. According to Koshiro: "For Bare Knuckle I used the PC88 and an original programming language I developed myself. The original was called MML, Music Macro Language. It's based on NEC's BASIC program, but I modified it heavily. It was more a BASIC-style language at first, but I modified it to be something more like Assembly. I called it 'Music Love'. I used it for all the Bare Knuckle Games." The soundtrack versions of the tracks use the NEC PC-88's Sound Board II (Yamaha YM2608) sound chip rather than the Sega Mega Drive's Yamaha YM2612 chip.

He said the most important element in recreating club music sounds for the games was to emulate the timbre and percussion sounds of Roland's rhythm machines (the most famous models being the TR-606, TR-707, TR-808, and TR-909), stating that "it wouldn't be an exaggeration to say that that sound defined the genre." In order to achieve this, he used the YM2612 sound chip's 8-bit PCM channel in conjunction with the other FM synthesis channels, with the Roland TR-909's kick and snare sounds sampled by the PCM, while the FM synth replicated the metallic sounds, hi-hat, and cymbal. He also replicated other percussion sounds such as the conga using detailed FM synth and MML programming. Beyond percussion, he also simulated the "unique, piercing" sounds of the Roland TB-303, an analog synthesizer that remains the most widely used bass synthesizer in club music (particularly acid and psychedelic music). He stated that it took "a good deal of painstaking work to recreate the sound of analog synths on FM synth, which lacks filter circuits, but I accomplished it using the same programming techniques as with the rhythm section."

Brett Elston of GamesRadar considers the soundtracks to have some of the best video game music ever composed.

== Streets of Rage 2 ==
Streets of Rage 2 Original Soundtrack

Soundtrack album by Yuzo Koshiro
- Released: January 21, 1993 (Japan); 2000 (US)
- Recorded: 1992
- Genres: Ambient, breakbeat, chiptune, dance, D&B, electro, electronica, hardcore, house, jazz, progressive, techno, trance, trip-hop
- Length: 55:21
- Labels: GMO Records / Alfa Records (Japan); Mars Colony Music (US)
- Producers: Yuzo Koshiro; Kyoji Kato

The soundtrack for 1992 video game Streets of Rage 2 was released in the United States. The tracks on this soundtrack are identical to the Japanese CD soundtrack known as Bare Knuckle II. It was mostly composed and played by Yuzo Koshiro, with a few tracks also composed by Motohiro Kawashima. The soundtrack is said to be one of Koshiro's greatest and it shows the power of the 16-bit Mega Drive/Genesis's YM2612 sound chip. The music was described by Koshiro as "hard-core techno". The game has also been noted as one of the first video games where the composer's name, Yuzo Koshiro, appears on the title screen.

The soundtrack was influenced by electronic dance music, specifically house, techno, hardcore techno, progressive techno, breakbeat, funk, and ethnic music. Koshiro also attempted to reproduce the Roland TR-808 and TR-909 beats and Roland TB-303 synths using FM synthesis. The soundtrack for Streets of Rage 2 (1992) is considered "revolutionary" and ahead of its time, for its "blend of swaggering house synths", "dirty" electro-funk and "trancey electronic textures that would feel as comfortable in a nightclub as a video game".

Square Enix Music Online praised the soundtrack for having "some of the baddest beats ever to grace a video game soundtrack" and its creative use of the Mega Drive/Genesis's limited sound chip, such as "panning in the left and right speakers" to keep "the melodic material briskly moving forward" in the first stage "Go Straight" track. "In the Bar" has been described as "dreamy" blues-influenced piece with "a briskly walking bassline" and "a semi-improvisational feel that adds a jazz mystique". The boss theme "Never Return Alive" is described as an "insane piece" where the "saw wave drills into your mind and serves as a nice syncopative measure to keep the edgy nature of the musical material intact throughout the piece's duration". The second stage "Spin on the Bridge" track, described as "hip hop on crack", has been praised for its "absolutely wicked breakbeats!" "Dreamer" has been described as a "dream-like" track with electronica arpeggiations, ethereal tones, and trance elements. "Alien Power" has been described as trip hop with "a bit of ethnic drum percussion", giving it a "strange and a bit creepy" feel. "Slow Moon" has been praised for its funk and call-and-response elements. "Jungle Base" has been described as a hard-hitting dance song. Another stand-out track is the seventh stage "Expander" theme, which was composed by Motohiro Kawashima and has been praised as a hard-hitting track with "raunchy synth bass, panning synths", and fast tempo. "Too Deep" has been described as an ambient track, though with sound effects that "sound like a ringing phone". The games soundtrack has further been considered one of the greatest of all time.

When originally reviewing the game, MegaTech gave the sound a score of 98%, and said it was "the best music you've ever heard on the Megadrive."

== Streets of Rage 3 ==
Bare Knuckle III

Soundtrack album by Yuzo Koshiro and Motohiro Kawashima
- Released: August 24, 1994
- Genres: Breakbeat, chiptune, dance, D&B, electro, electronic, experimental, gabber, hardcore, hardtechno, house, industrial, jungle, noise, techno, trance
- Length: 45:54
- Label: GMO Records / Alfa Records
- Producers: Yuzo Koshiro; Motohiro Kawashima

The music style of Streets of Rage 3 has a different feel to that of the first two games. Described by Yuzo Koshiro as "fast-beat techno like jungle", it was composed using his own "Automated Composing System", used to produce heavily randomized sequences. The soundtrack also had elements of abstract, experimental, gabber, and trance music. As with Streets of Rage 2, the soundtrack features tracks composed by both Koshiro and Motohiro Kawashima.

Unlike the first two soundtracks, the tracks are not in the order that they appear in-game. The full title of this CD is Bare Knuckle 3: Iron Fist Scriptures. The disc itself is difficult to find today.

For the soundtrack to Streets of Rage 3, Koshiro created a new composition method called the "Automated Composing System" to produce "fast-beat techno like jungle". It was the most advanced techno technique of the time, incorporating heavily randomized sequences. This resulted in innovative and experimental sounds generated automatically that, according to Koshiro, "you ordinarily never could imagine on your own". This method was very rare at the time, but has since become popular among techno and trance producers to get "unexpected and odd sounds".

The game's experimental, abrasive noise-based, electronic music received a mixed reception upon release, but has since been considered to be ahead of its time. According to Mean Machines, the "music takes some getting used to – ironically it pre-dated the 'trance' era that came a short while after release." The experimental sounds and use of heavily randomized sequences are also considered ahead of its time.

== Streets of Rage 4 ==
The music for Streets of Rage 4, developed by Dotemu, Lizardcube, and Guard Crush Games, was composed by Olivier Deriviere, with additional compositions from Yuzo Koshiro, Motohiro Kawashima, Yoko Shimomura, Keiji Yamagishi, Harumi Fujita, Das Mörtal, XL Middleton, Scattle and Groundislava. The soundtrack is structured so that Deriviere wrote the primary themes, while each boss fight's theme was written by one of the guest composers. Koshiro was not a part of the project from the start, but joined in June 2019 after playing a demo of the game at BitSummit, an indie game showcase in Japan. He cited fan requests and how the game was coming along as reasons for joining. Hideki Naganuma was also originally set to contribute, but dropped out of the project due to scheduling conflicts and was replaced by Fujita.

The soundtrack of the DLC Streets of Rage 4: Mr. X Nightmare, released on July 15, 2021, was fully composed by Tee Lopes.

The soundtrack was released digitally by Mutant Ninja Records and physically Brave Wave Productions alongside the game's release on April 30, 2020. A limited vinyl disc print was also released by Limited Run Games.
