= Streets of Rage Remake =

Unofficial video game series remake

- The logo of the fangame as originally displayed on the Bombergames forum, 2011
- Director: Bomber Link
- Composers: Gecko Yamori; BGM1401; B-A-C; Groovemaster303
- Series: Streets of Rage (unofficial)
- Platform: Microsoft Windows
- Release: April 3, 2011
- Genre: Beat 'em up
- Modes: Single-player, multiplayer

Streets of Rage Remake is a beat 'em up fangame developed by a team under the leadership of a Spanish developer named "Bomber Link" (known also as "Link"). It was a remake of the original Streets of Rage trilogy, with usage of gameplay mechanics and original tone from the series combined with additions not previously present in the original games. The game was particularly large with the inclusions of many playable characters, gameplay stages, and remixes of official soundtracks from the original Streets of Rage games. The fan project first began on March 17, 2003, and was worked on by more than 20 people.

Streets of Rage Remake fully released on the Bombergames forum website in April 2011 for download on the Windows PC platform before the download links were taken down by the forum's moderators because of a cease and desist order by Sega. Despite this, the Bombergames team continued to update the game, releasing a few bug fix plus content addition updates years after the download link takedowns.

The fangame itself received positive receptions as an unofficial series entry, with critics arguing that it surpasses the original Streets of Rage games. As a result, they had also criticized Sega's legal actions against the developers of Streets of Rage Remake, accusing Sega of fearing its success and stating that their actions tainted the company's reputation. Critics of Sega's legal actions argued that the company could have taken advantage of the fan-made project to enhance positive relationships with the gaming community.

== Gameplay and plot ==
Screenshot of a gameplay stage originally from Streets of Rage

Streets of Rage Remake is a fan-made homage to the original side-scrolling beat 'em up Streets of Rage trilogy, originally released for the Sega Genesis, Game Gear, and Master System consoles. The fangame aimed to remain loyal to the original series with responsive gameplay, consistent tone of the original games, and remixes of their soundtracks to evoke nostalgic responses from returning players while being distinct. The fangame includes 19 playable characters, most of whom were from the original trilogy, including hidden characters. For instance, players are able to play as Adam, exclusively from Streets of Rage (1991), with gameplay attributes from Streets of Rage 3. Another playable character is the series' main antagonist Mr. X. Streets of Rage Remake features 64 different enemy types, 83 remixes of the original games' official soundtracks, and 103 gameplay stages. Also included in-game are 40 cutscenes, 8 endings, and additional game modes such as Survival Mode, Boss Rush Mode, Events Mode, and Volleyball Mode. The likes of returning characters, remixes of the Streets of Rage trilogy's soundtracks, and multiple ingame pathways had previously been demonstrated in an early release of the fangame by 2007.

Streets of Rage Remake also contains gameplay features not originally present in the original games, such as new power-ups, bonus levels, an in-game shop to purchase items, and alternate level paths that players can choose from. The remake additionally includes cut content from the official games, like the previously scrapped motorcycle stage gimmick found in the codes of Streets of Rage 3.

== Development and closure ==
Prior to the release of Streets of Rage 4 in 2020, Sega released its last Streets of Rage franchise game in 1994, although it continued to rerelease the series on different ports. A development team, led by a Spanish developer named "Bomber Link" (known also as "Link"), began the Streets of Rage Remake project on March 17, 2003. A 2007 interview of the lead developer of the fangame revealed that his name is Eduard Luna Bolaño. The team consisted of more than 20 collaborators and went through about 8 years recreating the game from scratch. According to Link on his website, the fangame used neither reverse engineering nor any code from the original games. They were assisted by five musicians for remixing the original series' soundtracks for the remake. Link noted on his website's FAQ that his team notified Sega about the game's development well in advance before its eventual release. By the game's full release, Rock Paper Shotgun co-founder Alec Meer stated his concern that the fangame risks the provocation of copyright laws but expressed hope that it would remain because of it being apparently made from scratch and because its developers previously notified Sega about its existence.

By early April 2011, the final version of Streets of Rage Remake had been released for the Windows PC platform on the Bombergames forums, the install file being free for download and measuring 218MB total. At the time of its release, the fangame was at the development version "v5." The game file was subsequently dispersed across various other download and torrent links. Sega then proceeded to take action against the availability of the unauthorized game. They first targeted Link's forums to shut down public access of the project. The week after the game's release, Bombergames forums withdrew all available download links for the fan-made game. A moderator on the forums website wrote that Sega contacted the development team and then asked the forum members not to redistribute the game's install file for downloading, threatening to remove download links posted in the forums. The thread for discussing the Streets of Rage Remake was then locked. Kotaku writer Michael McWhertor suspected that it was only due to recent press about Streets of Rage Remake that Sega noticed its existence and took legal action.

A Sega spokesperson sent an emailed statement to Wired UK, stating on behalf of the company that while Sega was interested in supporting interested fans by involving them in beta testing games and other game development jobs that they felt the need to defend their intellectual property rights, which therefore can result in them requesting people to take down copyright violations. Wired UK author Mark Brown stated in an edited comment that Sega released a mobile port of Streets of Rage 2 at the same time of the fanmade remake's takedown in a "rather suspicious timing."

Despite the takedown of download links for Streets of Rage Remake in 2011, the Bombergames team continued to develop updates for the fangame, releasing v5.1 on the Bombergames forum a few years later to add in bug fixes and additional in-game content. On November 16, 2020, they released v5.2, implementing a new intro plus other improved graphics, improved AI for more challenging gameplay, and new or modified soundtracks by BGM1401 before his death the same year.

== Reception ==
Early versions of Streets of Rage Remake was well-received by the writers(s) of Diànzǐ Yóuxì Ruǎnjiàn in 2007, who spoke favorably of the project, noting that fans used their spare time to develop it for several years. They considered it to be a "masterpiece of extremely high quality" and noted that while certain features were not yet fully implemented, the player can still complete the game normally.

The reception to Streets of Rage Remake from 2011 onward was generally positive, with Mark Kretzschmar and Mel Stanfill stating that the game appealed to both gaming publications and the overall gaming community. Book author Ken Bruno considered the fangame to have surpassed the original game trilogy and therefore be a blessing for the franchise's fans. A composer of a fan remake of the game Penguin Adventure, going by the name "Gryzor87," listed Streets of Rage Remake as amongst his favorite "indie games," stating his opinion that it surpasses all other games ever produced by Sega. An article about the Streets of Rage franchise in the magazine Revista OLD!Gamer said that Streets of Rage Remake is both the "definitive" Streets of Rage and an example of fans producing unofficial content for an otherwise dormant franchise. The article remarked that the Bombergames team achieved a satisfying level of gameplay quality that Sega at its current state could never possibly achieve. Mega Visions writer going by the name "VirtuaDrew" gave praise to the option to readjust visual options or enable gameplay features. He argued that while the latter did upset the balance of the game itself, the fangame was more of a fan service than a serious game. He also gave praise to the remixes of the soundtracks as previously produced by the composer Yuzo Koshiro and the retaining of the retro game style but with visual enhancements.

As a result of the positive reviews of the fangame, Sega's legal actions against it were criticized by the Streets of Rage franchise's fans. The writer(s) of Revista OLD!Gamer in 2015 accused Sega of potentially fearing the remake's success and free access and deciding to take "revolting, but understandable" actions against it. Bruno said that Sega's actions against accessible downloads to the fangame tainted the reputation of the game company and gave it the reputation of the top killjoy of fanmade projects until Nintendo's actions against a fan remake of Metroid II: Return of Samus known as AM2R in 2016. He considered the history of Streets of Rage Remake to be a counterpart example to the success felt by Sonic Mania, which was developed by fans in cooperation with Sega.

=== Analysis ===
The cease and desist order by Sega for download links for Streets of Rage Remake was analyzed by several authors of academic sources. Ontario Tech University faculty member Steven Downing stated his opinion that the gaming industry should be mindful of the role of "digital pirates" in spreading gaming culture plus archiving old video games and maintain good relationships with "retro gamers" in order to sustain an active gaming community. Rarely, he said, did the gaming industry follow such practices. Using the Streets of Rage Remake takedown as an example, he said that Sega's actions seemed counterproductive to the potential ability for game publishers to maintain positive relationships with both game collectors and players who pirate games because they were unable to afford them in order to create better subcultural capital for retro gaming.

Kretzschmar and Stanfill also described the legal situation of Sega and the Streets of Rage fan remake. They questioned whether the developers behind Streets of Rage Remake could have defended their property as being of fair use under the US legal system, guessing that Bomber Link did not counter against Sega's legal action against his work because he did not have enough legal resources to do so. The cease and desist, the authors communicated, was an instance of fan-made content that "threatened" an industry because it was made without explicit permission despite positive fan appeals. They also argued that while Sega had the right to protect their intellectual property from infringing works, they could have better responded to Streets of Rage Remake filling in a market failure for stagnant franchises. They provided one alternate scenario that if the remake was popular, they could have considered it to be a canon remake and therefore encourage other modding projects for other franchises owned by Sega to increase further interest in Sega's franchises themselves.
