= Sonic the Hedgehog 2 (8-bit video game) =

1992 video game

- Master System cover art by Greg Martin
- Developers: Sega; Aspect
- Publisher: Sega
- Composers: Naofumi Hataya; Masafumi Ogata; Tomonori Sawada
- Series: Sonic the Hedgehog
- Platforms: Master System, Game Gear
- Release: Game Gear: JP: November 21, 1992; PAL: November 24, 1992; NA: December 1992; Master System: PAL: November 24, 1992
- Genre: Platform
- Mode: Single-player

Sonic the Hedgehog 2 (Note: Japanese: ソニック・ザ・ヘッジホッグ2(ツー), Hepburn: Sonikku za Hejjihoggu Tsū) is a 1992 platform video game by Sega for the Master System and Game Gear. It is the sequel to the 8-bit Sonic the Hedgehog (1991) and follows Sonic as he attempts to collect the Chaos Emeralds to find his friend Miles "Tails" Prower from Dr. Robotnik. Like the first Sonic the Hedgehog, players run through levels at high speeds while collecting rings and defeating enemies. Although it shares the same title with Sonic the Hedgehog 2 for the Sega Genesis and their releases coincided, the games have little in common and share no levels.

Unlike the first 8-bit Sonic game, which was developed by Ancient, Sonic 2 was developed by Aspect, which did not interact with the Sega Technical Institute team developing the Genesis version. Sonic 2 was released in November 1992 to critical acclaim. Critics considered it an improvement over the first 8-bit Sonic and praised its visuals and gameplay. The game has been rereleased in numerous formats, including Sonic compilations and Nintendo's Virtual Console service.

== Gameplay ==
Sonic collecting rings in Sky High Zone (Game Gear)

Sonic the Hedgehog 2's gameplay is largely the same as its 1991 predecessor. A side-scrolling platformer, the player controls Sonic the Hedgehog as he runs at high speeds, defeats enemies, and overcomes obstacles. The story takes place following the events of the last game; Sonic returns home to find that Dr. Robotnik has taken Miles "Tails" Prower, so he heads off to find him before it's too late.

Like the original, Sonic collects power-ups (such as boosts of speed and invincibility) that give him temporary powers, and rings to protect himself from being hit by enemies or obstacles. Sonic starts with three lives; if he is hit without carrying any rings, falls into a bottomless pit, drowns, or goes past the act's 10-minute mark, he loses a life. Losing all lives results in a game over. There are some changes, however; checkpoint and shield item boxes are absent, and Sonic can now collect rings he drops when damaged. Certain elements present in the Sega Genesis version of Sonic the Hedgehog are also implemented, such as the ability to smash through walls and run through vertical loops. The game also features modes of transportation for Sonic in which to maneuver the levels, including minecarts and hang gliders.

The game is split into seven levels called zones, each comprising two main acts and a boss fight with one of Doctor Robotnik's robots. While the 8-bit Sonic the Hedgehog stages borrowed thematically from those in the original 16-bit Sonic game, Sonic 2 features original levels to differentiate itself from its 16-bit counterpart. At the end of each main act, the player hits a signpost, which will spin and land on an image; it can award bonuses depending on the image it settles on. There are six Chaos Emeralds to collect throughout the stages. If the player collects them all, they will be able to save Tails at the end of the game.

== Development and release ==
Sonic the Hedgehog 2 was developed by Aspect with co-operation from Sega, unlike its predecessor which was developed by Ancient. Craig Stitt, who worked as a stage artist with Sega Technical Institute (STI) on Sonic 2 for the Sega Genesis, stated that there was little interaction between Aspect and STI.

Both versions of Sonic the Hedgehog 2 were released in PAL territories on November 24, 1992. The Game Gear version was released in Japan on November 21, 1992, and in North America the following month. It was the first four megabit cart for the Game Gear, the largest yet. The Master System version remained exclusive to PAL territories until it was released for the Wii's Virtual Console digital distribution service in Japan in November 2008, and in North America and PAL territories a month later. The Game Gear version was included as an unlockable bonus in Sonic Adventure DX: Director's Cut (2003), and as one of the games featured in the Sonic compilation Sonic Gems Collection (2005). The Game Gear version was released for the Nintendo 3DS's Virtual Console in Japan on October 31, 2012, followed by an international release on June 27, 2013. It was also released along with the other 11 Game Gear Sonic games on Sonic Origins Plus in 2023.

In the United Kingdom, all versions of Sonic the Hedgehog 2 (including the 16-bit Sonic 2) combined topped the Christmas 1992 sales charts. For the month of December 1992, the Mega Drive version was ranked number one, the Game Gear version number three, and the Master System version number four, while Super Mario Land 2: 6 Golden Coins for the Game Boy was number two. Sonic 2 is the bestselling Game Gear game, having sold over 400,000 copies.

== Reception ==
Contemporary reviews

Review scores
| Publication | Score | |
| Publication | Game Gear | Master System |
|---|---|---|
| Computer and Video Games | 92% | 93% |
| Famitsu | 6/10, 6/10, 7/10, 5/10 | N/A |
| Mean Machines Sega | 80% | 95% |
| Sega Force | 93% | 92% |
| Sega Power | 97% | 93% |
| Sega Zone | N/A | 90% |
| Sega Pro | 95% | 93% |

Award
| Publication | Award |
|---|---|
| Electronic Gaming Monthly | Portable Game of the Year (1992) |

Critics praised the Master System version as an improvement over the first Sonic game on the platform. Sega Power called Sonic 2 the best Master System game. Critics were impressed with the graphics, even leading some Mean Machines Sega staff to think they were viewing a Mega Drive game. Many journalists felt the game ran faster and smoother than Sonic 1, which Computer and Video Games credited to there being less enemies populating the levels. Sega Force felt the game could have benefited from more enemies gameplay-wise. Gameplay was otherwise praised, with critics taking a liking to the carts, gliders, and other new gameplay additions. Sega Power and Sega Zone enjoyed the secret rooms that could be found throughout the game. Complaints were directed towards the lack of a two-player mode, lack of special zones, and Tails being relegated to only appearing in the game's final cutscene.

Reviews for the Game Gear version carried many of the same sentiments as the Master System version. Sega Force explained that the game was almost identical to its home console counterpart, except for some tweaks to gameplay and graphics. Critics found the game was more difficult than the Master System version. Sega Force and Sega Pro found the hang glider difficult to control. Mean Machines Sega felt that the reduced field-of-vision on the Game Gear made gameplay tougher. Weekly Famicom Tsūshin echoed this, saying the level design was overtly difficult and cruel. Sega Force and Sega Pro both noted that the graphics, especially Sonic's character sprite, were notably larger than in the first Sonic Game Gear game and the home version of Sonic 2. They viewed this as an improvement to graphical fidelity. GamePro and Computer and Video Games felt the game was an improvement to the first Sonic game on the Game Gear. Two reviewers in Weekly Famicom Tsūshin found that it was inferior to the Sonic the Hedgehog 2 for the Sega Genesis. For their 1992 game awards, Electronic Gaming Monthly honored Sonic 2 as their "Game of the Year" among portable games.

=== Retrospective reviews ===
Retrospective reviews

Review scores
| Publication | Score | |
| Publication | Game Gear | Master System |
|---|---|---|
| AllGame | 3.5/5 | 3.5/5 |
| IGN | N/A | 8/10 |
| Nintendo Life | N/A | 7/10 |

Reviewing the Master System version, IGN praised the game for differentiating itself from the Genesis version with original stage themes and gameplay elements. While Hardcore Gaming 101 found the core gameplay good, they felt Sonic 2 was weaker than its predecessor, criticizing the level design and art direction. Kotaku called Sonic 2 the hardest Sonic game on the Game Gear because of its labyrinth-like levels paired with its small visual field. Hardcore Gaming 101 agreed with the game's reputation for difficulty, primarily due to its low screen resolution which makes hazards more difficult to anticipate. AllGame felt the game played very fast on the Game Gear for the system's processing power. Nintendo Life recommended it to Sonic fans looking to become better acquainted with 8-bit games in the series.
