= Streets of Rage 2 =

1992 video game

- North American Genesis box art by Mick McGinty
- Developers: Ancient (Note: Additional development by Shout! Design Works, M.N.M Software, and H.I.C.); Japan System House (Game Gear, Master System)
- Publisher: Sega
- Designers: Cadmix (main planner); Kataru Uchimura (system); Ayano Koshiro (main designer, planner); Mikito Ichikawa (planner)
- Programmer: Akitoshi Kawano
- Artist: Ayano Koshiro
- Composers: Yuzo Koshiro; Motohiro Kawashima
- Series: Streets of Rage
- Platforms: Sega Genesis, Game Gear, Master System, Nintendo 3DS
- Release: 1992: Genesis; NA: 1992; JP: January 14, 1993; EU: January 22, 1993 Game Gear; JP: July 23, 1994; EU: August 1993 Master System; EU: February 1994 Nintendo 3DS; JP: April 29, 2015; WW: July 23, 2015
- Genre: Beat 'em up
- Modes: Single-player, multiplayer

Streets of Rage 2, (Note: Written in PAL regions as Streets of Rage II) known as Bare Knuckle II in Japan, (Note: Fully titled Bea Nakkuru Tsū: Shitō e no Rekuiemu (ベア・ナックルII 死闘への鎮魂歌(レクイエム); lit. "Bare Knuckle II: The Requiem of the Deadly Battle")) is a 1992 beat 'em up video game developed by Ancient and published by Sega for the Sega Genesis. The sequel to Streets of Rage (1991), the characters Axel Stone and Blaze Fielding return while the game also introduces two new characters: Max Thunder, and Eddie "Skate" Hunter, (Note: Known as Sammy Hunter in Japan) the younger brother of Adam Hunter from the first game.

Streets of Rage 2 was developed by an ad hoc team of several companies: Ancient, Shout! Design Works, M.N.M Software, and H.I.C. Ancient's Ayano Koshiro was the lead graphic designer and one of the game design planners, while her brother Yuzo Koshiro composed the music.

Upon release, Streets of Rage 2 received critical acclaim and successful sales. The game developed a strong fandom, and ended up on several lists ranking the greatest video games of all time. It was succeeded by Streets of Rage 3 (1994), Streets of Rage 2 has since been re-released on other platforms.

== Gameplay ==
Genesis version screenshot with a fight in progress

Like the previous game, Streets of Rage 2 is a side-scrolling beat-em-up in which one or two players fight against waves of enemies while picking up weapons and items along the way. Along with returning characters Axel Stone and Blaze Fielding, the game introduces two new characters; Max Thunder, a slow-moving but powerful wrestler, and Eddie "Skate" Hunter (known as Sammy Hunter in the Japanese release), the brother of previous game's Adam Hunter who can move around quickly with his rollerblades. In addition to standard attacks, which have been expanded from the previous game, each character can perform a unique Blitz Attack by double tapping a direction before attacking. Replacing the police car attack from the previous game, each character can perform Special Attacks which can deal extra damage or attack enemies from all directions at the cost of the player's health. Along with the main campaign, two players can also fight against each other in the game's Duel mode.

== Plot ==
One year has passed since the events of Streets of Rage. To celebrate the defeat of the mysterious Mr. X and his criminal organization, The Syndicate, the trio of Axel Stone, Adam Hunter, and Blaze Fielding had met at their favorite nightspot in Wood Oak City, reminiscing about both their vigilante crusade and triumphant victory from within the previous year. Axel and Blaze had moved out of the city after the adventure, with Axel working as a part-time bodyguard and Blaze teaching dance classes. Adam has since rejoined the police force and lives in a small house with his younger brother, Eddie "Skate" Hunter.

The next afternoon, Blaze had received an emergency phone call from Skate, who had informed her that upon arriving at home from school, Skate was shocked to find his house in ruin and his older brother missing. Attached to the front door was a picture of Adam chained to a wall at the feet of Mr. X. The criminals began to retake the streets once more, as beatings and looting took place regularly and in broad daylight; chaos reigned in Wood Oak City, far worse than before. Realizing that Mr. X and The Syndicate have returned for revenge against them and the city, Blaze wastes no time in informing Axel about the unexpected situation, with Axel himself personally vowing to help Blaze out in defeating Mr. X and rescuing Adam. From within the preparation of their upcoming second battle against Mr. X and The Syndicate, Blaze and Axel are soon joined by Skate, who wishes to help out in rescuing and saving his older brother Adam and Axel's friend, a professional wrestler named Max Thunder who also seeks to help aid Axel and Blaze out as well in rescuing and saving their kidnapped friend.

The quartet soon embarks on a rescue mission, which will take them from Wood Oak City all the way to Mr. X's hideout on a desolate island, where they will eventually face Mr. X and his bodyguard Shiva. Unlike the other two games in the series, Streets of Rage 2 has only one ending, where Mr. X is defeated and Adam is rescued, after which the heroes leave in a helicopter.

== Development ==
=== Design and programming ===
Ancient's Ayano Koshiro served as the lead graphic designer and one of the planners on the game design team. She designed the graphics, characters, and combat mechanics. Her brother Yuzo Koshiro, the lead music composer, also provided some input on the combat. The brother-sister team took inspiration from Capcom's Street Fighter II, an arcade cabinet of which they had installed at the Ancient office. The hit arcade video game influenced the combat system of Streets of Rage 2.

=== Soundtrack ===
The soundtrack for Streets of Rage 2 was composed by Yuzo Koshiro, along with three contributions from Motohiro Kawashima. It was composed using then outdated NEC PC-8801 hardware alongside Koshiro's own audio programming language. According to Koshiro: "For Bare Knuckle I used the PC88 and an original programming language I developed myself. The original was called MML, Music Macro Language. It's based on NEC's BASIC program, but I modified it heavily. It was more a BASIC-style language at first, but I modified it to be something more like Assembly. I called it Music Love'. I used it for all the Bare Knuckle Games."

The soundtrack was influenced by electronic dance music, specifically house, techno, hardcore techno, and breakbeat. The soundtrack for Streets of Rage 2 is considered "revolutionary" and ahead of its time, for its "blend of swaggering house synths", "dirty" electro-funk and "trancey electronic textures that would feel as comfortable in a nightclub as a video game."

== Release ==
In Japan and Europe, Streets of Rage 2's title uses Roman numerals (Bare Knuckle II in Japan and Streets of Rage II in Europe) instead of the Arabic numerals used in North America (Streets of Rage 2). In the North American version, Blaze's flying kick sprite was slightly edited to be less risqué. The Japanese version also shows Mr. X smoking a cigar, which was edited out of the EU and U.S. versions. The Japanese version gives Skate's first name as Sammy, but in the European and North American versions, his name is Eddie. The European version gives Max's second name as Hatchett; the North American and Japanese versions give it as Thunder.

Streets of Rage 2 supports the Sega Activator peripheral, which was first shown at the January 1993 Consumer Electronics Show (CES), where it was demonstrated with Streets of Rage 2.

=== Ports ===
The Master System and Game Gear 8-bit versions of Streets of Rage 2 are quite different from the Mega Drive original, and to each other, similar to the Master System/Game Gear version of Sonic the Hedgehog. In addition to having different levels and the inferior graphics, Max Thunder is omitted from both. The Game Gear version does not show enemy names.

An arcade version of Streets of Rage 2 was released onto Sega's Mega Drive based Mega-Play hardware. It uses a regular credit system. In this version, all 1-ups have been replaced by money bags, there is no in-game timer and the difficulty levels are one step above the Mega Drive version. Scoring is kept by number of KOs, instead of damage inflicted.

Streets of Rage 2 was collected in the Sega Smash Pack for Sega's final home console the Dreamcast. There is also a port of the game as well as the first and third games on the Japanese version of Sonic Gems Collection for the PlayStation 2 and GameCube. The ports on Sonic Gems Collection are Genesis perfect and are the Japanese versions of the games (they are also available on GameTap). The game appears in Sonic's Ultimate Genesis Collection for Xbox 360 and PlayStation 3. The game appears in Sega Genesis Classics for PlayStation 4, Xbox One, and Nintendo Switch.

The game was released for Japan's Virtual Console on May 15, 2007, and then released on North America's on May 21, 2007, and on Europe's on June 1, 2007. On August 29, 2007, Streets of Rage 2 was released on Xbox Live Arcade for the Xbox 360 console, featuring filtered graphics and online co-operative play. It was later removed from the service in June 2012 and replaced with the Streets of Rage Collection, which includes all three games of the series. The original game was released for the iPhone and iPod Touch in April 2011. Streets of Rage 2 was released on the PlayStation Network June 28, 2011 for the PlayStation 3. It was published on Steam on 26 January 2011, both as stand-alone purchase and part of the SEGA Genesis / Mega Drive Classics Pack 4. The game was released on the Nintendo Classics service on October 25, 2021.

3D Streets of Rage 2 was developed by M2 as part of the 3D Classics series for the Nintendo 3DS. It was released on April 29, 2015, in Japan and worldwide on July 23, 2015. In addition to being redesigned with the stereoscopic 3D effects of the 3DS, it features two new gameplay modes in Rage Relay and Casual Mode. Rage Relay allows the player to play through the game using all four characters in any chosen order, and will switch to the next in line each time they die. Casual Mode allows players to instantly defeat enemies, including bosses, by knocking them to the ground or using combos.

== Reception ==
Contemporary Mega Drive/Genesis reviews

Review scores
Publication	Score
Beep! MegaDrive	34/40
Consoles +	92%
Computer and Video Games	95%
Famitsu	26/40
GameFan	386/400
GamePro	5/5
GamesMaster	88%
HobbyConsolas	93%
Joypad	93%
Joystick	94%
Mean Machines Sega	90%
Bad Influence!	9/10
Mean Machines	92%
Mega Play	164/200
MegaTech	94%
Sega Force	93%
Sega Power	92%
Sega Pro	96%

Awards
Publication	Award
GameFan Golden Megawards	Best Game, Best Action Fighting Game, Best Game Music
Mega Reader Awards	Best Beat-'Em-Up
Electronic Gaming Monthly (EGM)	Hottest Video Game Babe (Blaze)

=== Sales ===
Upon release in North America, it was one of the top five best-selling Genesis games in December 1992, and among the top five best-selling Genesis games at Babbage's for several months through March 1993. In Japan, it was the top-selling Mega Drive game in January 1993, and eleventh on the all-formats chart in its debut week.

In Europe, it was the third best-selling video game between 1992 and early 1993, below Super Mario Kart and Sonic the Hedgehog 2. In the United Kingdom, Streets of Rage 2 debuted as the number-one best-seller on the all-formats console game chart as well as the Mega Drive chart in January 1993. On subsequent UK sales charts, it was the number-two console game (below Super Mario Kart) and number-one Mega Drive game in February, number-two on the all-formats chart in March, and among the top five console games and top three Mega Drive games in April 1993.

The Xbox Live Arcade digital version of Streets of Rage 2 sold 184,555 units on the Xbox 360 console, as of 2011. As of August 2020, Gamstat estimates that the game has 570,000 players on Xbox 360, and 1.5 million players on PlayStation 3. The free-to-play Android version Streets of Rage 2 Classic has received more than 1 million mobile game downloads, as of 2019.

=== Reviews ===
Upon release, Streets of Rage 2 received widespread critical acclaim, with scores above 90% from most video game magazines at the time. In the United States, GamePro gave it a perfect score, stating that "against the Final Fights and Super Double Dragons of the world, Streets of Rage 2 more than fends for itself" and concluded it to be the "side-scrolling street fighter to beat." GameFan's four reviewers gave it scores of 97, 95, 97 and 97. They described it as "the best fighting game" and "best side scroll fighter" they "ever played," praising the gameplay, graphics, sound effects, and Yuzo Koshiro music, concluding it to be "the best fighting sequel of '92." Mega Play reviewers gave it scores of 84 and 80, with the former describing it as "definitely one of the best games in this genre for the Genesis" while the latter criticized the special moves for giving "too much strength" and making "the game too easy" but concluded it to be "a solid two player game". In Japan, Famitsu gave it a score of 26 out of 40.

In the United Kingdom, Computer and Video Games gave it a highly positive review, with reviewer Steve Keen stating it "is without doubt the finest scrolling arcade beat 'em up on any format" and that it is like taking Street Fighter II and "dumping the characters into a horizontally-shifting arcade extravaganza and that's basically the result you get with this game." Sega Force reviewers gave it scores of 95, 93, and 92, with one reviewer describing it as the "first 16 Meg" (2 MB) "cartridge to grace the MD," possibly "the best MD game to date and definitely the best beat 'em up on any console," and "the best thing to happen to MD owners since the rise of a certain blue hedgehog," while another described it as "an awesome game" and another stated that it "deserves a place in any gamer's collection"; they concluded that it "wipes the floor with Street Fighter II."

Mean Machines gave it a positive review, describing it as "the ultimate cartridge beat 'em' up on the Megadrive," praising the graphics as "superb, with huge sprites and great animation" and "loads of enemies attacking at once," the sound and presentation as "of an equally high standard," and the gameplay as "superb, especially in two-player team mode." Mean Machines Sega gave it a positive review, with one reviewer describing it as "a truly arcade quality beat 'em up" that "beats the spots off any Neo Geo beat 'em up" and as "simply the best beat 'em up you can get for a console" while another reviewer recommended that, "if you don't like beat 'em ups, buy it anyway, because this game will convert you"; they conclude it to be "the greatest sequel we've seen for ages" and as "certainly the best scrolling beat 'em up ever to hit a home console!" British television show Bad Influence! had a panel of teenagers review the game, with the boys scoring it 4 out of 5 stars while the girls scored it a full 5 stars.

=== Awards ===
Upon release, Streets of Rage 2 received the Mega Game award from Mean Machines Sega, and the Sega Force Smash award from Sega Force. The GameFan Golden Megawards gave it the awards for Best Game, Best Action Fighting Game, and Best Game Music. The Mega Reader Awards voted it the Best Beat-'Em-Up of 1992.

Electronic Gaming Monthly gave it the award for "Hottest Video Game Babe (Blaze)" in 1993.

=== Retrospective ===
Ports and retrospective reviews

Aggregate scores
Aggregator	Score						
Aggregator	3DS	Game Gear	iOS	Master System	Sega Genesis	Wii	Xbox 360
GameRankings					88%		
Metacritic	89/100		71/100				76/100

Review scores
Publication	Score						
Publication	3DS	Game Gear	iOS	Master System	Sega Genesis	Wii	Xbox 360
AllGame		3.5/5			4.5/5	3.5/5	3.5/5
Computer and Video Games		94%					
Eurogamer						8/10	8/10
GameSpot						7.8/10	8/10
IGN						8.5/10	7.3/10
Mean Machines Sega		89%		85%			
Official Xbox Magazine (UK)							9/10
TouchArcade			4.5/5				
Sega Power		74%					
Sega Pro		90%		90%			
VideoGames NZ					94%		

Streets of Rage 2 has been considered by many to be one of the best games ever made. In 2004, readers of Retro Gamer magazine voted Streets of Rage 2 as the 64th best retro game of all time, and the staff later included in their top ten lists of Mega Drive, Game Gear, and Nomad games. It has also been listed as one of the best games ever made by publications such as Stuff, and as one of the greatest retro games by sites such as NowGamer and BuzzFeed.

The upgraded Nintendo 3DS version has also received high acclaim, with Nintendo World Report writing that the "impeccable port combined with the additional features and cool 3D effect make this the definitive version of one of the pinnacles of the genre".

=== Music ===
The game's soundtrack also received a positive reception for its techno-based chiptune tracks which impressed many gamers and critics at the time, especially due to the audio limitations of the Mega Drive/Genesis console. In 1993, Electronic Games listed the first two Streets of Rage games as having some of the best video game music soundtracks they "ever heard" and described Yuzo Koshiro as "just about universally acknowledged as the most gifted composer currently working in the video game field." Notably, the boss theme is considered one of the best boss themes in the 16-bit era and of all time. The reception for the soundtrack was so high that the game's music composer, Yuzo Koshiro, was invited to nightclubs to DJ the tracks.
