= Sega Classics Arcade Collection =

- Developer: Sega
- Publisher: Sega
- Platform: Sega CD
- Release: 4-in-1: NA: October 15, 1992; JP: April 23, 1993; 5-in-1: EU: April 2, 1993; NA: 1994
- Genre: Various
- Modes: Single-player, multiplayer

Sega Classics Arcade Collection is the name of two compilations released for the Sega CD. Despite their titles, both versions of Sega Classics Arcade Collection include only the Sega Genesis ports of all the games included.

== Sega Classics Arcade Collection 4-in-1 ==
Released in 1992, the 4-in-1 version of Sega Classics was sold with the Sega Multi-Mega/CDX, and retailed at $59.99. In some instances it was also bundled with the Sega CD version of Sherlock Holmes: Consulting Detective and with the Sega CD itself.

Games:

- Columns (1990)
- Golden Axe (1989)
- The Revenge of Shinobi (1989)
- Streets of Rage (1991)

The version of Revenge of Shinobi included in this collection is software revision 1.02, including only the Spider-Man boss-fight, with Godzilla and Batman replaced with substitute enemies.

Golden Axe is the only game in the collection that has external CD audio (aside from Columns but only the title screen track uses CD audio) and it uses the arcade version's soundtrack. However, it is heavily based on the Mega Drive port with the voices changed to higher quality voices (none of them, besides the townspeople screaming in Turtle Village, are from the Genesis or Arcade version).

In the Japanese version, Streets of Rage goes by its western name rather than its Japanese name Bare Knuckle. Streets of Rage is generally the same as the Genesis version aside from the voices, which are CD quality enhanced.

== Sega Classics Arcade Collection 5-in-1 ==
It was only sold as a pack-in game with the Sega CD, the collection added Super Monaco GP but was otherwise identical, including the version of Revenge of Shinobi included. In Europe, where only this version was released, the compilation was re-titled as Sega Classics Arcade Collection Limited Edition.

Games:

- Columns (1990)
- Golden Axe (1989)
- Revenge of Shinobi (1989)
- Streets of Rage (1991)
- Super Monaco GP (1989)

== Reception ==
Reception

Review score
Publication	Score
Sega Force	66%

Sega Force's reviewers felt that the compilation would only be a good purchase for players who had not played the games, with one suggesting that Sega retry with better titles.
