= Streets of Rage =

Video game series by Sega

- Series logo as of Streets of Rage 4
- Genre: Beat 'em up
- Developers: Sega AM7; Ancient; Lizardcube; Guard Crush Games; Dotemu
- Publishers: Sega; Dotemu
- Composers: Yuzo Koshiro; Motohiro Kawashima
- Platforms: Sega Genesis; Game Gear; Master System; Sega CD; Arcade; Nintendo Switch; PlayStation 4; Xbox One; Windows; MacOS; Linux; Stadia
- First release: Streets of Rage; August 2, 1991
- Latest release: Streets of Rage 4 April 30, 2020

Streets of Rage (titled Bare Knuckle in Japan) is a series of side-scrolling beat 'em up video games. It centers on the efforts of several ex-police vigilantes trying to rid the fictional American metropolis of Wood Oak City of a crime syndicate that has corrupted its local government. The first three games in the franchise were developed and released by Sega for the Sega Genesis in the early 1990s and have since been ported and re-released on various platforms. A fourth entry was also released in 2020.

The games were well received and have been re-released many times, both on compilations and as stand-alone games. The electronic dance music soundtracks of the games, scored primarily by Yuzo Koshiro and Motohiro Kawashima, have also received much praise.

== History ==
Release timeline
1991	Streets of Rage
1992	Streets of Rage 2
1993
1994	Streets of Rage 3
1995–2019
2020	Streets of Rage 4

=== Original trilogy ===
Three games in the series were released between 1991 and 1994. The first entry, Streets of Rage, focused on former police officers Axel Stone, Blaze Fielding, and Adam Hunter as they battle the forces of the crime lord Mr. X. It is the only game in the series to feature a Shinobi-style special attack that defeats all non-boss enemies on-screen. Streets of Rage was released for Sega's Mega Drive/Genesis, Master System and Game Gear consoles.

The second entry in the series, Streets of Rage 2, had new music (influenced by early-1990s club music) from series composer Yuzo Koshiro and newcomer composer Motohiro Kawashima, more defined graphics and a larger selection of moves. It also introduced two new characters: Eddie "Skate" Hunter, and Max Thunder (or Sammy "Skate" Hunter and Max Hatchett in some regions). Like the original title, Streets of Rage 2 was playable on Sega's Genesis, Master System, and Game Gear.

The third entry to the Streets of Rage series, Streets of Rage 3, was less well received than its predecessors; despite some enhancements, it was seen as very similar to the second game. This entry added a more complex storyline told using cutscenes. The Western version featured increased difficulty, with other elements altered or censored from the Japanese release. The music, again composed by Koshiro and Kawashima, was also criticized for being radically different from the music of the first two games. Unlike the two preceding games, Streets of Rage 3 was available only on the Genesis.

=== Series hiatus ===
Although it was one of the most popular Sega franchises in the 1990s, no new official Streets of Rage games were released for over 25 years after Streets of Rage 3, excluding re-releases of the first three games via various Sega game compilations.

Sega is reported to have attempted to bring the series to the Saturn, and early in the production cycle for Sega's Dreamcast a demo tentatively titled Streets of Rage 4 was made by Ancient. It showed a character similar to Axel fighting a group of enemies. Neither the Saturn nor the Dreamcast game, however, came to fruition. Around 2009, Swedish game company Grin were working on a remake of the original game through its Barcelona satellite studio, but development did not last long. Backbone Entertainment later pitched a new Streets of Rage game to Sega, but this project also failed to proceed.

Numerous unofficial fan-made projects and remakes have been developed, including Beats of Rage and Streets of Rage Remake. The latter fan-made project began on March 17, 2003 and consisted of more than 20 developers. The lead developer, named "Bomber Link", stated that the game was made from scratch without borrowing any element of reverse engineering. Streets of Rage Remake released in April 2011 as a download from the Bombergames forums for the Windows PC platform. Days after the game's release, Sega took legal action against the unauthorized game in the form of a cease and desist order, going after the Bombergames forum. After Sega contacted the development team, the forum's website took down links to the game's download and asked forum members to not redistribute the game file.

=== Revival ===
The 2015 crossover game Project X Zone 2 featured Axel Stone as an assist character (solo unit), along with the Mr. X-possessed Robot Axel as a boss character (rival unit). This marked the first new appearance of Streets of Rage characters in over 20 years.

The first new entry in the series since Streets of Rage 3, Streets of Rage 4, was announced in 2018 and released in 2020, taking place ten years after the events of Streets of Rage 3. The game was developed by Lizardcube, Guard Crush Games, and Dotemu, who previously released the 2017 remake of Wonder Boy III: The Dragon's Trap.

A spin-off minigame based on the Yakuza/Like a Dragon series, Streets of Kamurocho, was released as part of Sega's 60th anniversary celebration. It was developed by Empty Clip Studios and was only available for Windows via Steam on October 17–19 and November 13–16, 2020.

Sega announced a new Streets of Rage game at The Game Awards 2023, with a management meeting presentation revealing its name as Streets of Rage: Revolution.

== Other media ==
=== Comics ===
Three six-part comic strip series based upon the games appeared in Sonic the Comic in the early 1990s (along with several other adaptations of popular Sega franchises). The first two of these were written by Mark Millar, while the third (and a Sonic the Poster Mag story) was written by Nigel Kitching. These three stories are an alternate continuity from the games and do not feature Adam. A graphic novel compilation of the original six-part "Streets of Rage" strip was released as a book titled Streets of Rage: Bad City Fighters in the UK in 1994.

The first story, entitled simply Streets of Rage (#7–12, 1993), involved Axel, Blaze, and Max quitting the highly corrupt police force in order to do more good as vigilantes, taking down Max's ex-partner; the crime lord and martial artist Hawk. The next serial, Skates' Story (#25–30, 1994), introduced Skates, delinquent stepson of Murphy, a friend of Axel and his team and one of the few honest cops left on the force, who was unwillingly drawn into joining Axel's group after his stepfather was killed by Mr. X. The third and final story, The Only Game in Town (#41-46, 1994–95), involved the Syndicate unleashing an army of street gangs. The Poster Mag story The Facts of Life (Poster Mag #7, 1994) features Axel, Blaze, Skate, and Max.

=== Music ===
The game's soundtrack was acclaimed, with several soundtrack albums being released. The soundtracks were composed by Yuzo Koshiro. Another musician, Motohiro Kawashima, helped on the second, providing a few tracks, and making almost half of the tracks for the third. Three soundtrack CDs were released in all, each of which now sell for high prices at auction and in Japanese markets.

The soundtracks mainly consist of often experimental chiptune-based electronic dance music, encompassing electronic genres such as electro, house, techno, hardcore, jungle, ambient, breakbeat, gabber, noise, and trance. The music was produced using the Yamaha FM-synth sound chips of the Sega Mega Drive / Genesis video game console (YM2612) and NEC PC-88 computer (YM2608), along with Koshiro's own audio programming language "Music Love", a modified version of the PC-88's Music Macro Language (MML).

The game's soundtracks have received great critical acclaim. They are considered ahead of their time by GamesRadar, and as some of the best video game music of all time. Streets of Rage 2 (1992) is considered revolutionary particularly for its "blend of swaggering house synths", "dirty" electro-funk and "trancey electronic textures that would feel as comfortable in a nightclub as a video game". Streets of Rage 3 is also considered ahead of its time, for its automatically generated randomized sequences, experimental hardcore "fast-beat techno like jungle" sounds, and trance music elements. The series' soundtracks have influenced a range of chiptune, electronica, grime and dubstep musicians through to the present day, including artists such as Ikonika, BT, Labrinth, Martyn, Joker, Darkstar, Childish Gambino, and Danger.

=== Novella ===
A Streets of Rage 2 novella (published together with a Street Fighter II novella) was written by Mat Yeo in 1993. It is just 35 pages long, based on the second game in the series, and was given away free with copies of Sega Force magazine in the United Kingdom.

=== Upcoming film and television adaptations ===
In 2016, a feature film on the series was announced in 2016, subsequently going into turnaround and the rights reverting back to Sega.

In November 2022, Lionsgate optioned the rights with Story Kitchen and Escape Artists set to produce. In June 2026, Pat Casey and Josh Miller were brought on as writers after Derek Kolstad was brought on to pen the screenplay in 2022, though he will produce the film while Jeymes Samuel helms as director.
