= Sonic Gems Collection =

2005 video game compilation by Sega

- North American GameCube cover art, depicting Sonic and Metal Sonic
- Developer: Sonic Team
- Publisher: Sega
- Director: Mizuki Hosoyamada
- Producer: Yojiro Ogawa
- Designer: Makoto Hirata
- Programmers: Makoto Suzuki; Takahiro Sekiguchi
- Artist: Yuji Uekawa
- Composers: Naofumi Hataya; Tatsuyuki Maeda; Takenobu Mitsuyoshi; Tomonori Sawada; Takeshi Isozaki
- Series: Sonic the Hedgehog
- Platforms: GameCube; PlayStation 2
- Release: GameCube: JP: August 11, 2005; NA: August 16, 2005; EU: September 30, 2005; AU: October 7, 2005; PlayStation 2: JP: August 11, 2005; EU: September 30, 2005; AU: October 5, 2005
- Genre: Various
- Modes: Single-player, multiplayer

Sonic Gems Collection is a 2005 compilation of Sega video games, primarily those in the Sonic the Hedgehog series. It is the successor to the 2002 compilation Sonic Mega Collection; while Mega Collection focused on the more notable Sonic games released on Sega Genesis, (Note: The PS2, Xbox, and PC versions, released as Sonic Mega Collection Plus in 2004, also included six Game Gear titles) Gems Collection focuses on more obscure games from a wider variety of platforms, featuring the titles Sonic CD (1993), Sonic the Fighters (1996), and Sonic R (1997). Alongside these games, the compilation inlcudes six Sonic games for the Game Gear, as well as bonus unlockable content, such as promotional images, videos, demos, original music, and several non-Sonic games for the Genesis, some of which were omitted in the Western localization.

Developer Sonic Team conceived the compilation to introduce younger players to older Sonic games. One game they wished to include, SegaSonic the Hedgehog (1993), was excluded due to emulation difficulties. Sega released Gems Collection for the GameCube and PlayStation 2 in August 2005. Reviews were mixed or average; critics were divided over whether the package would satisfy players. They preferred Sonic CD and Vectorman, but found Sonic the Fighters and Sonic R mediocre, and disliked the Game Gear games. Some were disappointed by the absence of the Streets of Rage games in the international version and other Sonic games like SegaSonic the Hedgehog, Knuckles' Chaotix and Sonic the Hedgehog Pocket Adventure.

== Games ==
Sonic Gems Collection is a compilation of obscure video games published by Sega for various consoles, such as the Sega CD, Sega Saturn, and Game Gear. It primarily focuses on Sonic the Hedgehog games, including Sonic CD (1993), Sonic the Fighters (1996), Sonic R (1997), and six of the twelve Sonic games released for the Game Gear, with the other six having been included in the previous compilation release, Sonic Mega Collection Plus. These games encompass various genres, such as platforming, fighting, racing, pinball, and puzzle. Players can also unlock the two Vectorman games for Sega Genesis (1995 and 1996). Four additional Genesis games, Bonanza Bros. (1990) and the Streets of Rage trilogy (1991–1994), are unlockable only in the Japanese version and are not included in any international releases. Each game is mostly identical to its initial release, but some were changed; for example, Sonic R runs at a higher frame rate. Players can view scans of the original instruction manuals for each game, along with hints and cheat codes.

The compilation features an extensive museum section in which players can view content—such as promotional artwork, videos, screenshots, and remixed music—unlocked after obtaining achievements. Time-limited demos of the Genesis Sonic games (Note: Sonic the Hedgehog (1991), Sonic the Hedgehog 2 (1992), Sonic Spinball (1993), Dr. Robotnik's Mean Bean Machine (1993), Sonic the Hedgehog 3 (1994), Sonic & Knuckles (1994), and Sonic 3D Blast (1996)) and the other six Game Gear games (Note: Sonic the Hedgehog (1991), Sonic Chaos (1993), Sonic Drift (1994), Sonic Labyrinth (1995), Dr. Robotnik's Mean Bean Machine (1995), and Sonic Blast (1996)) can also be unlocked. In each demo, the player begins in the respective game's final level and can play until the time limit is met.

Games included in Sonic Gems Collection
Featured games
Title	Genre	Original platform	Original release	Developer
Sonic CD	Platform	Sega CD	1993	Sega
Sonic the Fighters	Fighting	Arcade	1996	Sega AM2
Sonic R	Racing	Saturn	1997	Traveller's Tales, Sonic Team
Game Gear games
Title	Genre	Original platform	Original release	Developer
Sonic the Hedgehog 2	Platform	Game Gear	1992	Aspect
Sonic Spinball	Pinball	Game Gear	1993	Sega Technical Institute
Sonic the Hedgehog: Triple Trouble	Platform	Game Gear	1994	Aspect
Sonic Drift 2	Racing	Game Gear	1995	Sega
Tails' Skypatrol	Puzzle	Game Gear	1995	SIMS
Tails Adventure	Platform	Game Gear	1995	Aspect
Unlockable games
Title	Genre	Original platform	Original release	Developer
Vectorman	Platform, run-and-gun	Sega Genesis	1995	BlueSky Software
Vectorman 2	Platform, run-and-gun	Sega Genesis	1996	BlueSky Software
Bonanza Bros. (Note: Only available in the Japanese release.)	Shooter	Sega Genesis	1990	Sega
Streets of Rage	Beat 'em up	Sega Genesis	1991	Sega
Streets of Rage 2	Beat 'em up	Sega Genesis	1992	Sega
Streets of Rage 3	Beat 'em up	Sega Genesis	1994	Sega

== Development and release ==
Sonic Gems Collection was developed by Sonic Team and published by Sega for the GameCube and PlayStation 2. According to Sonic Team director Yojiro Ogawa, the compilation (and its 2002 predecessor Sonic Mega Collection) was conceived to introduce young players to older games in the Sonic franchise. While Sonic Mega Collection focused on the original Genesis games to showcase what made the franchise a success, Sonic Gems Collection focused on games Sega considered rare and obscure. Although Sonic Team was responsible for Sonic Gems Collection's creation, they had limited involvement in the development of the games included on the compilation; for example, Sega AM2 made Sonic the Fighters, and Sonic R was primarily developed by Traveller's Tales.

At the beginning of Gems Collection's development, Sonic Team made a list of the most wanted games for the compilation. The team considered the games they felt were high quality in graphics, gameplay, and overall nature. Sonic CD and Vectorman were considered for inclusion in Mega Collection, but were deferred to Gems Collection. Producer Yuji Naka said storage constraints prevented Sonic CD from inclusion in Mega Collection. AM3's SegaSonic the Hedgehog (1993) was omitted due to problems emulating its trackball controls. The Genesis and Game Gear games included are emulated, while Sonic the Fighters, Sonic CD and Sonic R are ports. AM2 assisted in porting Sonic the Fighters, marking its first release on a home console. The Windows versions of Sonic CD and Sonic R were ported for Sonic Gems Collection. Both games received visual upgrades: Sonic CD's opening sequence is presented in fullscreen and higher quality, while Sonic R has higher resolution textures.

During development, Sonic Team hoped that each region's version of Sonic Gems Collection would be identical in content. However, the Streets of Rage games and Bonanza Bros. had to be omitted from the Western localization, due to fears of a "Teen" rating from the Entertainment Software Rating Board (ESRB). The team also wished to include both the Japanese and North American Sonic CD soundtracks, but storage and licensing problems resulted in Japan only receiving its respective soundtrack and all other regions using the North American version. Sonic Gems Collection was announced in May 2005, and was playable at the Electronic Entertainment Expo (E3). It was released on August 11, 2005 in Japan, August 16, 2005 in North America, September 30, 2005 in Europe. In Australia, the game was released for PlayStation 2 and GameCube the following week on October 5 and October 7, respectively. The PlayStation 2 version was not released in North America. Those who ordered the game through Sega's online store Sega Direct received an exclusive Sonic-themed yo-yo.

== Reception ==
Reception

Aggregate score
Aggregator	Score
Metacritic	64/100 (32 reviews)

Review scores
Publication	Score
1Up.com	C+
Electronic Gaming Monthly	6.2/10
Eurogamer	7/10
GameSpot	6.3/10
GameSpy	3.5/5
IGN	7.5/10
Jeuxvideo.com	9/20
Nintendo Power	8.5/10

According to Metacritic, a video game review aggregator, Sonic Gems Collection received "mixed or average" reviews. By November 22, 2005, the compilation sold 200,000 copies outside Japan. In 2006, the GameCube version was branded a Player's Choice game.

Reviewers considered Sonic CD the compilation's strongest feature, so much that Nintendo Power's Steve T. and Electronic Gaming Monthly (EGM) said it was worth buying for Sonic CD alone. Juan Castro (IGN) found that Sonic CD "still holds its own against modern platformers", praising its unique, time-travel oriented gameplay, level design, visuals, and sound. Castro called it one of the best games in the Sonic series and was no less fun than its original release. Ryan Davis (GameSpot) found Sonic CD superior to the other games in the compilation, and Tom Bramwell (Eurogamer) declared "rejoice for Sonic CD... Just don't rejoice for anything else, because it's mostly rubbish". Many reviewers were also pleased by the inclusion of the Vectorman games. Castro called it "the pinnacle of 16-bit gaming", praising its melding of boss fights, action, and platforming and saying it aged well. Bramwell and Phil Theobald (GameSpy) agreed.

Critics generally felt Sonic R and Sonic the Fighters were mediocre. Castro, Theobald, and Davis compared Sonic the Fighters unfavorably to the Virtua Fighter games, with Davis calling it dated and simplistic. Jeuxvideo.com's Superpanda, in a negative review of the compilation, argued that Sonic the Fighters was too short and had control issues, but that Sonic R was on par with Sonic CD in terms of quality, praising the game's graphics and claiming that it was the compilation's most beautiful game. Castro was less positive: he found its ideas clever and considered it an interesting departure from normal racing games, but thought the ideas were poorly implemented and the controls were awkward. However, he still thought the game was enjoyable and that its soundtrack was unique. Theobald voiced a similar opinion, considering it "a concept that works better in theory than in practice". Conversely, Davis said Sonic R's "laughably bad soundtrack" was its "only redeeming quality". Bramwell considered it too odd and short to be worth the player's time.

The six Game Gear Sonic games were criticized for their uneven quality and poor emulation. Theobald liked that the games were available from the start, but was puzzled why the other six games were left out. He also considered the selection random ("why Sonic 2, but no Sonic?"). Castro was intrigued that they were all on one disc, but thought their screen displays were bad and said "you'd probably be better off dusting your old [Game Gear] and finding those old games" rather than playing them on Sonic Gems Collection. Of the Game Gear games, Davis preferred Sonic 2, Sonic Triple Trouble, and Tails Skypatrol, but disliked the rest. He heavily criticized their emulation quality, noting their frequent frame rate drops. Bramwell joked they were present on the disc for "educational" purposes. He lambasted their resolutions and encouraged readers to ignore them entirely.

Some reviewers found the compilation incomplete. Davis and Theobald both criticized the exclusion of the Streets of Rage games in the North American version. Davis stated he preferred them over Vectorman and Theobald said Sega should have just let the compilation get a Teen rating from the ESRB. Theobald was also disappointed that the compilation lacked SegaSonic the Hedgehog, Knuckles' Chaotix, and the other Game Gear games. Jeremy Parish (1UP.com) said even combining Sonic Mega Collection and Sonic Gems Collection would provide players an incomplete Sonic collection, lambasting the exclusion of Knuckles' Chaotix and Sonic the Hedgehog Pocket Adventure and feeling the Master System Sonic games should have been included, not the Game Gear ones. Superpanda said he would have preferred Knuckles' Chaotix over the Game Gear games and also considered its exclusion of the Saturn version of Sonic 3D Blast a disappointment.

Reviewers were generally divided over whether Sonic Gems Collection would leave players satisfied. EGM summed it up as a "woefully uneven mix", but one Sonic fans should check out if they wanted Sonic CD. Castro said the compilation was "decent" and worth its price tag, but was not as solid as Sonic Mega Collection. Theobald found it weak and that only Sonic CD and Vectorman would appeal to casual gamers. Bramwell was sarcastic: "if this sort of thing matters to you, if you still can't bear to unplug your Dreamcast, and you do own Virtua Fighter 4 and all the others and think they're brilliant, this is for you". When Famitsu named the best games of 2005, it ranked Sonic Gems Collection among the bottom of the PlayStation 2 and GameCube releases.
