= Protect Me Knight =

2010 video game

- Box art showcasing both the Japanese and English versions' art styles
- Developer: Ancient
- Publisher: Ancient
- Composer: Yuzo Koshiro
- Platform: Xbox 360
- Release: May 24, 2010
- Genre: Tower defense
- Modes: Single-player, multiplayer

Protect Me Knight (Note: Japanese: まもって騎士, Hepburn: Mamotte Naito) is a 2010 tower defense video game by Ancient for the Xbox 360. Released on the Xbox Live Indie Games service, the game features music composed by Ancient co-founder Yuzo Koshiro.

Players assume the roles of four character classes (Fighter, Ninja, Amazon and Mage) tasked with the duty of protecting a princess from legions of oncoming monster hordes. Protect Me Knight features 8-bit visuals and audio and contains different digital box art styles for the Japanese and English versions of the game, as a humorous spoof to the regional box art differences of video games from the 8-bit and 16-bit eras.

== Legacy ==
A sequel, Gotta Protectors, was released for the Nintendo 3DS in Japan in September 2014 and globally in July 2016. A spin-off, Gotta Protectors: Amazon's Running Diet, was released on the Nintendo Entertainment System in 2017. The game depicts a woman running as she tries to collect water while avoiding the cakes. A third game, Gotta Protectors: Cart of Darkness, was released for the Nintendo Switch in Japan in October 2019 and in English by 8-4 in April 2022.
