= The G.G. Shinobi II: The Silent Fury =

1992 video game

- North American box art
- Developer: Sega
- Publisher: Sega
- Designer: Masahide Kobayashi
- Programmers: Tadashi Eda; Yuichi Matsuoka
- Artists: Ryo Kudou; Yoshiki Nozaki
- Composers: Yuzo Koshiro; Motohiro Kawashima
- Series: Shinobi
- Platform: Game Gear
- Release: NA: December 1992; JP: December 11, 1992; EU: February 1993
- Genres: Platform, hack and slash
- Mode: Single-player

The G.G Shinobi II: The Silent Fury (Note: Japanese: ザ・GG忍 II, Hepburn: Za GG Shinobu II) (Note: The cover artwork of the western releases simplifies the game's title to Shinobi II: The Silent Fury. The full name is still used on the title screen.) is a 1992 platform game developed and published by Sega for the Game Gear. It is the sequel to The G.G. Shinobi, an offshoot of the Shinobi series created for Sega's portable platform. The player controls ninja Joe Musashi and his allies as they attempt to retrieve five elemental crystals from a group known as the Techno-Warriors. The gameplay largely follows on from its predecessor’s design, in which the player utilizes the abilities of five colored ninjas to progress through a series of levels.

The G.G. Shinobi II received a positive reception from critics, who praised the game for improving upon its mechanics, level design, and difficulty compared to its predecessor.

== Gameplay ==
The G.G. Shinobi II is a side-scrolling platform game with elements of hack and slash. The player begins the game as Joe Musashi (the Red Ninja), whose mission is to retrieve five elemental crystals that were stolen by the enemy and spread across different locations. Similar to the original G.G. Shinobi, the first four levels can be played in any order, and after defeating the boss of each level, Musashi will be joined by one of his allies, allowing the player to control them as well. Some of the ninjas' abilities are different from those in the previous game. Depending on the stage, the player must use a specific ninja's ability to reach the location of the crystal. As a result, some of the stages must be played more than once if the player does not have the necessary character yet. When the first four crystals are all gathered, the player gains access to the enemy's main base, where the fifth crystal is being held by the final boss.

Each ninja has a particular skill set that includes a unique weapon, special ability, and ninja magic. Each of these skills can be used to destroy enemies, access secret areas, and obtain hidden health power-ups.

== Plot ==
The evil Techno-Warriors have enlisted the Black Ninja, master of ninja techniques, to help them take over Neo City. This evil syndicate has captured the four elemental crystals and their guardian ninja. Joe Musashi has to rescue the four fellow ninja and retrieve their corresponding Elemental Crystals before the final showdown against the evil Black Ninja in his castle.

== Reception ==
The G.G. Shinobi II: The Silent Fury was very well received by game critics. Power Unlimited gave the game a score of 82% writing: "Shinobi II: The Silent Fury is ideally suited for the Game Gear. The image is clear, the game is challenging, and you can continue playing later through a password system. It is a pity that your only movements are jumping and chopping." In 2011, Complex.com ranked it as the 18th greatest handheld game of all time, adding "it was definitely one of the reasons we were Sega fanboys/fangirls back in the day. Why get a Game Boy when you could get THIS?" Retro Gamer included this "more balanced" sequel to the first G.G. Shinobi on their list of top ten Game Gear games for its "far tighter level design, faster flowing action and greatly improved gameplay mechanics".
