= The G.G. Shinobi =

1991 video game

- North American cover art by Greg Winters
- Developer: Sega
- Publisher: Sega
- Designers: Katsuhiro Hasegawa; Masahide Kobayashi
- Programmers: Kenji Shintani; Yūichi Matsuoka
- Artists: Ryō Kudō; Hisato Fukumoto
- Composer: Yuzo Koshiro
- Series: Shinobi
- Platform: Game Gear
- Release: JP: April 26, 1991; NA: June 1991; EU: July 1991
- Genres: Platform, hack and slash
- Mode: Single-player

The G.G. Shinobi (ザ・GG忍) (Note: The game is simply labeled Shinobi on the cover artwork of the western versions, but the title screen still displays The G.G. Shinobi.) is a 1991 hack and slash platform game developed and published by Sega for the Game Gear. It was the first Shinobi game developed specifically for a portable game platform. The player controls the modern-day ninja Joe Musashi, protagonist of previous Shinobi games, as he goes on a mission to rescue four kidnapped comrades from an enemy, gaining control of the other ninjas (each with different abilities) as the game progresses like Mega Man. It was followed by The G.G. Shinobi II: The Silent Fury in 1993. The G.G. Shinobi was one of the first Game Gear games available on the Nintendo 3DS Virtual Console in March 2012.

== Plot ==
Terror and destruction have made their way to Ninja Valley. The Master of the Oboro school of shinobi sends his best students to investigate the suburban areas. They return with news of a powerful dark force that has established a base within Neo City.

The Master knows that only a warrior trained in the arts of ninjutsu can stand against this menace. One by one, his greatest pupils enter Neo City to locate and destroy the source of the evil. Ninja Valley has lost contact with each of them. All are believed to be captured.

Joe Musashi, the Red Shinobi, must carry out this dire mission. As the oldest and strongest of his ninja disciples, Musashi must use his special skills in the art of ninjutsu to free his fellow shinobi. With their combined strength, they can destroy the City of Fear.

== Gameplay ==
The play mechanics of The G.G. Shinobi are roughly based on the Genesis game The Revenge of Shinobi, but with the addition of a character-switching system. The player starts the game as Joe Musashi (the red ninja), whose goal is to rescue four kidnapped allies who are being held captive in different stages. There are four stages. These can be played in any order. Each ninja character has a unique weapon, ninjutsu (typically consuming one ninjutsu spell), and ability.

After completing all four stages, the player automatically enters the fifth and final stage (Neo City), proceeding through a series of trap rooms. Each room requires the skills of a particular ninja character to pass it. Almost all rooms have two exits that lead to further distinct trap rooms. Whilst exploring Neo City, the player will encounter further bosses, finishing with the final one.

== Reception ==
Retro Gamer called The G.G. Shinobi "unquestionably a classic slice of ninja heaven" but noted it was "notoriously difficult".
