= Sega Genesis Classics =

2010 video game compilation

- International release cover with dual title
- Developers: Sega; D3T
- Publisher: Sega
- Engine: Unity
- Platforms: Windows; Linux macOS; PlayStation 4 Xbox One; Nintendo Switch
- Release: Windows; June 1, 2010 (Vol. 1); September 13, 2010 (Vol. 2); October 26, 2010 (Vol. 3); January 26, 2011 (Vol. 4); May 2, 2012 (Vol. 5); Linux, macOS, PlayStation 4, Xbox One; May 29, 2018; Nintendo Switch: EU: December 6, 2018; NA: December 7, 2018
- Genre: Various
- Modes: Single-player, multiplayer

Sega Genesis Classics (released as Sega Mega Drive Classics in PAL regions) (Note: Also internationally known as Sega Mega Drive & Genesis Classics) is a series of compilations featuring Sega Genesis video games released for Windows, Linux, macOS, PlayStation 4, Xbox One and Nintendo Switch. The collections are split into "Volumes" for PC releases only, with the first four receiving both physical and digital releases and the fifth volume only being digitally released.

== Background ==
Sega re-released the first four physically released volumes as the Sega Genesis Classic Collection: Gold Edition (Sega Mega Drive Classics: Gold Edition in PAL regions) for Windows (Sega Mega Drive Classics: Gold Edition in PAL regions), for Windows. It is a four-disc set containing 46 Sega Genesis games from the first four volumes. The collection has configurable keyboard support, which provides a personalised gaming experience, as well as a multiplayer mode for a select number of titles. The collection also includes save and load functionality in all of the games, allowing players to resume their saved games at the exact point where they left off.

Sega released a free application on Steam on April 28, 2016, called the Sega Genesis Classics Hub (Sega Mega Drive Classics Hub in PAL regions). The application presents a virtual hub, themed after what a bedroom of a Sega fanatic might be like, to play all of the released Sega Genesis games through it. The Hub includes Steam Workshop integration, supporting ROM hacks for these games; within a day of its release, several previously developed ROM hacks were added by users to the Hub's Workshop. Any Sega Genesis games previously purchased on Steam, including collections, are automatically added to players' game libraries in the Hub. A few weeks following the release of the Hub, Sega reported more than 350,000 new purchases of the various games supported by the new software. The Sega Mega Drive and Genesis Classics compilation has sold 1,514,485 digital units on Steam, as of 1 July 2018.

Sega released a compilation of all of the games included in compilations listed below with some exceptions in an entry simply titled Sega Genesis Classics (Sega Mega Drive Classics in PAL regions) for Linux, macOS, PlayStation 4 and Xbox One on May 29, 2018. It uses the same interface as Sega Genesis Classics Hub, but with added features such as achievements and rewinding in-game. These features were later added to the Sega Genesis Classics Hub. Additionally, select games can be played in their Japanese versions. The compilation released on Nintendo Switch on December 6, 2018. The Steam version of the collection used to exclude the Sonic the Hedgehog and ToeJam & Earl games. The former could only be purchased as a part of Sonic-related compilations, but are now included in the Steam collection. All games can be purchased separately, but the Sonic games are sold at higher prices.

On May 20, 2022, Sonic the Hedgehog, Sonic the Hedgehog 2, and Sonic the Hedgehog 3 & Knuckles were removed from individual and compilations sale on Steam, to be replaced by the Sonic Origins compilation which includes those titles, as well as Sonic CD, which was also delisted. This made it impossible to get all achievements.

On November 6, 2024, it was announced the bundle contents and collection as a whole would be delisted digitally from all major platforms on December 6, 2024.

== List of games ==
Title	Volume							
Title	Vol. 1	Vol. 2	Vol. 3	Vol. 4	Vol. 5	Gold	Console	Steam
Alex Kidd in the Enchanted Castle	No	Yes	No	No	No	Yes	Yes	Yes
Alien Soldier	No	No	No	Yes	No	Yes	Yes (Note: Includes alternate region version. Alien Soldier, Dynamite Headdy, Ristar, and Streets of Rage 2 have Japanese versions. Streets of Rage 3 includes European English & Japanese versions. Beyond Oasis includes the French, German, Spanish, and Japanese versions. Landstalker has French and German versions included.)	Yes
Alien Storm	No	No	Yes	No	No	Yes	Yes	Yes
Altered Beast	Yes	No	No	No	No	Yes	Yes	Yes
Beyond Oasis	No	No	No	No	Yes	No	Yes	Yes
Bio-Hazard Battle	No	No	Yes	No	No	Yes	Yes	Yes
Bonanza Bros.	No	Yes	No	No	No	Yes	Yes	Yes
Columns	No	Yes	No	No	No	Yes	Yes	Yes
Columns III	No	No	Yes	No	No	Yes	Yes	Yes
Comix Zone	Yes	No	No	No	No	Yes	Yes	Yes
Crack Down	Yes	No	No	No	No	Yes	Yes	Yes
Decap Attack	No	No	Yes	No	No	Yes	Yes	Yes
Dr. Robotnik's Mean Bean Machine	No	No	No	Yes (Note: Only available in the physical disc release.)	No	Yes	Yes	Yes
Dynamite Headdy	No	No	No	No	Yes	No	Yes	Yes
Ecco the Dolphin	Yes	No	No	No	No	Yes	No	Yes
Ecco: The Tides of Time	No	No	Yes	No	No	Yes	No	Yes
Ecco Jr.	No	Yes	No	No	No	Yes	No	Yes
ESWAT: City Under Siege	No	Yes	Yes (Note: Only available in the digital download release.)	No	No	Yes	Yes	Yes
Eternal Champions	No	Yes	No	No	No	No	No	Yes
Fatal Labyrinth	No	Yes	No	No	No	Yes	Yes	Yes
Flicky	No	No	Yes	No	No	Yes	Yes	Yes
Gain Ground	Yes	No	No	No	No	Yes	Yes	Yes
Galaxy Force II	No	Yes	No	No	No	Yes	Yes	Yes
Golden Axe	Yes	No	No	No	No	Yes	Yes	Yes
Golden Axe II	No	Yes	Yes	No	No	Yes	Yes	Yes
Golden Axe III	No	No	No	No	Yes	No	Yes	Yes
Gunstar Heroes	No	No	No	Yes	No	Yes	Yes	Yes
Kid Chameleon	No	Yes	No	No	No	Yes	Yes	Yes
Landstalker	No	No	No	Yes	No	Yes	Yes	Yes
Light Crusader	No	No	No	Yes	No	Yes	Yes	Yes
Phantasy Star II	No	No	No	No	Yes	No	Yes	Yes
Phantasy Star III: Generations of Doom	No	No	No	No	Yes	No	Yes	Yes
Phantasy Star IV: The End of the Millennium	No	No	No	No	Yes	No	Yes	Yes
The Revenge of Shinobi	No	No	No	No	Yes	No	Yes	Yes
Ristar	No	Yes	No	No	No	Yes	Yes	Yes
Shadow Dancer: The Secret of Shinobi	Yes	No	No	No	No	No	Yes	Yes
Shining in the Darkness	No	No	No	Yes	No	Yes	Yes	Yes
Shining Force	No	No	No	Yes	No	Yes	Yes	Yes
Shining Force II	No	No	No	Yes	No	Yes	Yes	Yes
Shinobi III: Return of the Ninja Master	Yes	No	No	No	No	Yes	Yes	Yes
Sonic 3D Blast	No	No	No	Yes	No	Yes	Yes	Yes
Sonic the Hedgehog	Yes	No	No	No	No	Yes	Yes	Yes (Note: Removed from sale on May 20, 2022. Replaced by Sonic Origins.)
Sonic the Hedgehog 2	No	Yes	No	No	No	Yes	Yes	Yes
Sonic the Hedgehog 3/Sonic & Knuckles	No	No	Yes	No	No	Yes	No	Yes
Sonic Spinball	No	No	Yes	No	No	Yes	Yes	Yes
Space Harrier II	Yes	No	No	No	No	Yes	Yes	Yes
Streets of Rage	No	No	No	Yes	No	Yes	Yes	Yes
Streets of Rage 2	No	No	No	Yes	No	Yes	Yes	Yes
Streets of Rage 3	No	No	No	No	Yes	No	Yes	Yes
Super Thunder Blade	No	Yes	No	No	No	Yes	Yes	Yes
Sword of Vermilion	No	No	Yes	No	No	Yes	Yes	Yes
ToeJam & Earl	No	No	No	No	No	Yes	Yes	Yes
ToeJam & Earl in Panic on Funkotron	No	No	No	Yes	No	No	Yes	Yes
Vectorman	Yes	No	No	No	No	Yes	Yes	Yes
Vectorman 2	No	No	No	No	Yes	No	Yes	Yes
Virtua Fighter 2	No	No	Yes	No	No	Yes	Yes	Yes
Wonder Boy III: Monster Lair	No	No	No	Yes	No	No	Yes (Note: Not available in Nintendo Switch version.)	Yes
Wonder Boy in Monster World	No	No	No	No	Yes	No	Yes	Yes

== Reception ==
Reception

Aggregate score
Aggregator	Score
Metacritic	(NS) 80/100 (PS4) 75/100 (XONE) 73/100

Review scores
Publication	Score
Hardcore Gamer	4/5
Nintendo Life	8/10
Nintendo World Report	9.5/10
Push Square	7/10

Sega Genesis Classics received "generally favorable" reviews, according to review aggregator website Metacritic.
