= Group S Challenge =

2003 video game

- North American Xbox cover art featuring the 1996 RUF CTR2 (foreground) and the 1999 Mazda RX-7 (background)
- Developer: DigitalStudio
- Publisher: Capcom
- Director: Masaya Ishizuka
- Producers: Tatsuya Minami; Koji Nakajima
- Designer: Ryutaro Ichikura
- Composers: Takeshi Yanagawa; Motohiro Kawashima
- Platform: Xbox
- Release: JP: August 28, 2003; EU: September 26, 2003; NA: November 11, 2003
- Genre: Racing
- Modes: Single-player, multiplayer

Group S Challenge, known in Japan as Circus Drive (サーカスドライブ, Sākasu Doraibu), is a 2003 racing video game developed by DigitalStudio and published by Capcom for the Xbox. It features fully licensed cars, including from Ford, Chevrolet, and Ruf.

== Arcade mode ==
Group S Challenge features four styles in arcade mode: Single Player, Two Player Versus, One Make and Time Attack.

Single Player allows the player to race against AI (artificial intelligence) drivers. In Two Player Versus, two players race on a split screen. One Make measures who possesses the best driving ability, with the player choosing one car model for all vehicles in the race, including the player's own. In Time Attack, the player focuses on trying to post the fastest lap-time.

== Circuit mode ==
Group S Challenge also offers a career mode. Unlike many games featuring a career mode, Group S Challenge contains no cutscenes and lacks a developing story. Instead, the game offers three different racing types: Championship, Line and Dual.

In Championship, the player races to unlock different classes of cars and earns money for upgrades or a new car. Championship has four different "classes" or "tiers", for cars, with higher tiers offering faster cars. Group C is the lowest tier containing the slowest car. Groups B and A contain progressively faster rides. Group S is the top class and it contains supercars and hypercars. A car from a slower group is allowed in a higher class race, but faster cars cannot enter a lower class race. The player can earn money by driving in the racing line on the track during Line mode. Dual mode allows the player to unlock special cars that cannot be bought. In order to acquire one of these cars, the player must race and win against it in three different cars that the player already owns.

== Tracks ==
Three different race courses appear with six variations per course: Part A, Part B, Full Track, Part A Reverse, Part B Reverse, and Full Track Reverse. The three different race tracks are Monaco in Europe, Surfers Paradise in Australia and Shibuya in Japan.

== Reception ==
Reception

Aggregate score
Aggregator	Score
Metacritic	57/100

Review scores
Publication	Score
Edge	5/10
Electronic Gaming Monthly	5.33/10
Famitsu	28/40
Game Informer	6.75/10
GamePro	4/5
GameSpot	6.2/10
GameSpy	2/5
GameZone	7.7/10
Official Xbox Magazine (US)	7.8/10
TeamXbox	5.6/10

The game received "mixed" reviews according to the review aggregation website Metacritic. In Japan, Famitsu gave it a score of 28 out of 40. Many reviewers gave it positive to mixed reviews a few months before its U.S. release date.

== See also ==
- Auto Modellista
