= Amazing Island =

2004 video game

- North American cover art
- Developers: Sega (Hitmaker Div.); Ancient
- Publisher: Sega
- Directors: Junichi Tsuchiya; Keisuke Miyanaga
- Producer: Seijirou Sannabe
- Designer: Kataru Uchimura
- Artist: Ayano Koshiro
- Composers: Yuzo Koshiro; Motohiro Kawashima
- Platform: GameCube
- Release: JP: January 15, 2004; NA: August 24, 2004
- Genre: Action-adventure
- Modes: Single-player, multiplayer

Amazing Island (Note: known in Japan as Kaijuu no Shima: Amazing Island (カイジュウの島 ～アメージングアイランド～)) is a 2004 action-adventure game developed and published by Sega alongside Ancient for the GameCube.

== Gameplay ==
After customizing a character's gender and name, the player helps the Maboo Tribe of the Amazing Island remove a possessing spirit known as the "Black Evil".

Amazing Island is a minigame collection. The player chooses either a boy or girl avatar, along with a monster companion. By completing courses, the player gains Vision Orbs, which drives off the Black Evil, restores portions of the Island, and earns them new abilities and items to customize their monster partner. Upon purging the whole Island of Evil, the villagers and the player hold a celebration.

Any time the player visits the Hall of Life, they can customize an existing monster or create a new monster. Creating a new monster costs nothing and will grant the player an additional Chance Star to use during minigames. If players' creature loses all of its Chance Stars, their creature will go back to the start and return players back to the village. To create a new monster, the player is to choose a Frame which acts as a skeleton for various body types, such as a dragon or a giant. Then the player can draw limbs and body parts on their creature, and choose how thick or thin they are to be. New frames are gathered from completed Courses and more advanced drawing tools such as a Stamp or Resize are gained from Vision Orbs.

Monsters can be further customized, once built. Patterns are textures that drawn on the body that can range from materials e.g. Glass, Rock, Lava; skins e.g. Dog, Cow, Parrot; or outfits e.g. Ninja, Santa, Cute Robot. Eyes, voices, and accessories such as clothing or weapons can be added. More component variations and tools can be gained from Vision Orbs. New monster components can be bought from Shops or found in silver chests from Courses and imported from Monster Cards.

Finally the player names their monster and takes their photo, which is a card that links the monster to the human world from Amazing Island. Preset monsters are fully predesigned monsters that can be acquired by finding their monster cards in gold chests. The player cannot modify these monsters at all, but they do not take space on the Nintendo GameCube memory card. The player can also take a five-question personality quiz to have a monster randomly generated.

Every aspect of a monster—frame, accessories, actual drawn body shape and thickness—affects its stats: Speed, Mental, Power, Stamina, Weight, Element, and Class. Various events rely on different stats; for example, races will use Speed while fights rely on Power. Monsters in their element, such as a Fire monster in a Spin (lava) stage, will gain an advantage. The Class stat denotes the overall skill level of the monster.

=== Multiplayer ===
Amazing Island offers multiplayer options, where two to four players can compete on the courses or link up in the Monster Cards minigame.

In the main game, players can complete an entire Course or specific event. They also have the option to use multiple memory cards to import their own monsters and cross-reference high scores between save files. In Monster Cards, up to four Game Boy Advances can link up to battle each other. If arranged close together, all four screens form an entire battle view. The last survivor of a Monster Cards battle will be awarded a chest.

== Reception ==
Reception

Aggregate score
Aggregator	Score
Metacritic	59%

Review score
Publication	Score
IGN	6.7 out of 10

The game received mostly mixed reviews. IGN described it as "Frankenstein meets Pokemon meets Mario Party" but concluded that it "could have used a little more depth. True, it's technically a kid’s game, but even younger gamers will expect a little more", criticizing the simplistic graphics, sound, story, and gameplay.
