= Streets of Rage (video game) =

1991 video game

- North American cover art
- Developer: Sega
- Publisher: Sega
- Director: Noriyoshi Ohba
- Designers: Noriyoshi Ohba; Hiroaki Chino
- Programmer: Hiroshi Momota
- Composer: Yuzo Koshiro
- Series: Streets of Rage
- Platforms: Mega Drive/Genesis; Sega CD; Game Gear; Master System; Nintendo 3DS
- Release: August 2, 1991: Mega Drive/Genesis; JP: August 2, 1991; NA: 1991; EU: September 1991 Game Gear; EU: October 18, 1992; JP: November 27, 1992; NA: December 31, 1992 Master System; PAL: June 7, 1993 3DS; JP: August 21, 2013; NA/EU: December 19, 2013
- Genre: Beat 'em up
- Modes: Single-player, multiplayer

Streets of Rage (Note: Known in Japan as Bare Knuckle: Furious Iron Fist (Japanese: ベアナックル 怒りの鉄拳, Hepburn: Bea Nakkuru: Ikari no Tekken)) is a 1991 beat 'em up video game developed and published by Sega for the Sega Genesis. Players control one of three former police officers turned vigilantes who battle a crime syndicate. It establishes many conventions of the Streets of Rage series, such as two-player cooperative play and an acclaimed techno soundtrack from composer Yuzo Koshiro. It was ported for the Game Gear, Sega CD and Master System and has been rereleased as part of various compilations and on download services.

== Gameplay ==
Genesis version screenshot

Streets of Rage is a beat 'em up featuring aspects of Double Dragon and Final Fight. Players act as Adam Hunter, Axel Stone, or Blaze Fielding, who save Wood Oak City from being overtaken by a criminal syndicate led by Mr. X. The three traverse eight levels and all have a total of 40 moves, such as headbutts, backslams, and reverse kicks. Surrounding the landscape are weapons that can be used to attack enemies, like knives, glass bottles, pipes, and baseball bats, and food items which increase energy, such as apples and chicken.

As in Sega's previous beat 'em up Golden Axe, enemies walk onto the screen from both sides as well as occasionally appearing from other locations. Foes include ninjas, punks, and women in bondage, and up to 12 can appear on-screen. The player must defeat each opponent to progress through eight locations, known as rounds. Apart from round 7, there is a boss battle at the end of every round with a disproportionately large enemy. Unlike its sequels, none of the enemies are named within the game (they are named only in the Japanese version's manual) and only the bosses have a visible life bar.

Players also have a limited number of special attacks that allow them to call their former comrades, the police and summon a police car which fires explosives, damaging all enemies on-screen. The player is given one special attack per life or per level and power-ups shaped like police cars can sometimes be found to supply additional specials.

== Development ==
The working title for Streets of Rage was DSWAT. This was to signify the idea that it took place in the same universe as ESWAT: City Under Siege, an earlier Sega game. The cop car from the ending of ESWAT on the Genesis is the same as the support car in this title. Lead designer Noriyoshi Oba broached the idea of doing a street fighting game along the lines of Final Fight and Double Dragon with Yuzo Koshiro. Oba was also influenced by action television shows such as Starsky & Hutch and The A-Team. The game was designed for players to focus on preventing enemies from swarming them, as well as to work with a second player using various cooperative team moves.

== Releases ==
=== Ports ===
8-Bit Versions
Port	Release	Features
Game Gear	JP: November 27, 1992; NA: December 1992; EU: 1992	Adam is omitted.; 5 rounds in the game.; 2-player feature via cable link.; Knee smash grapple move is omitted.
Master System	PAL: June 7, 1993	Cut-down music and introduction; 1-player only; Unique boss on Round 6; Only 2 enemy characters can appear on-screen
16-Bit Versions
Arcade (Mega Tech / Mega Play)	1991	Played for time, not credits
Wii	NA: February 19, 2007; JP: February 27, 2007; EU: March 2, 2007	
iOS	NA: September 14, 2009	2-player feature unavailable
Microsoft Windows	WW: January 26, 2011	
Nintendo 3DS	JP: August 21, 2013; NA: December 19, 2013; EU: December 19, 2013	3D effect; One hit kill mode; Bare Knuckle (Japanese version) mode; CRT TV mode; Restore Points

=== Collections ===
A signature title and franchise for Sega during the Mega Drive era, the title was often released in Sega video game compilations.

- Mega Games II (compiled with Golden Axe and The Revenge of Shinobi) that was later bundled with the Mega Drive.
- Sega Classics Arcade Collection (a Mega CD compilation with the two previously mentioned titles, plus Super Monaco GP and Columns, also available as in cartridge format for Mega Drive II). The voice effects for the characters in this version of the game were all redone.
- Sega Genesis 6-PAK (composed of Streets of Rage, Sonic the Hedgehog, Columns, The Revenge of Shinobi, Golden Axe and Super Hang-On); and Mega 6 (composed of Streets of Rage, World Cup Italia '90, Columns, Super Monaco GP, The Revenge of Shinobi and Sonic the Hedgehog).
- Streets of Rage, along with its two sequels, is included in the Japanese version of the Sonic Gems Collection for the GameCube and PlayStation 2, but was omitted from the Western versions to avoid it gaining an T rating.
- They were previously available on GameTap until the service shutdown in 2015.
- Streets of Rage along with both of its sequels are included in Sonic's Ultimate Genesis Collection for Xbox 360 and PlayStation 3.
- AtGames had released several plug and plays of the Sega Genesis both in SD and HD that includes all three Streets of Rage titles along with other Sega Genesis hits like Golden Axe and Sonic the Hedgehog.
- In 2012, Streets of Rage Collection, a package of all three Streets of Rage games, was released on Xbox Live Arcade as part of the Sega Vintage Collection range of titles.
- On January 26, 2011, Streets of Rage was released on Windows, both as a standalone purchase and part of the SEGA Mega Drive Classics Pack 4.
- On August 21, 2013, 3D Streets of Rage was released for Nintendo 3DS, both as a Nintendo eShop standalone purchase and later on December 18, 2014 as a part of the Sega 3D Fukkoku Archives.
- On May 29, 2018, Sega released Sega Genesis Classics (known as Sega Mega Drive Classics in PAL regions) which includes Streets of Rage 1-3.
- On April 11, 2025, it was released on the Nintendo Classics service for the Nintendo Switch.

== Reception ==
Contemporary reception

Review scores
Publication	Score
Electronic Gaming Monthly	36/40
HobbyConsolas	90% (Mega Drive); 89% (Game Gear)
Mean Machines Sega	90%
MegaTech	92% (Mega Drive)
Mega Zone	91/100 (Mega Drive)
Wizard	B (Sega CD)
Mega Action	89% (Mega Drive)
Mega Play	36/40 (Mega Drive)

Retrospective reception

Aggregate score
Aggregator	Score
GameRankings	75%

Review score
Publication	Score
Nintendo Life	7/10 (Wii)

The game topped the UK Mega Drive charts upon release. Streets of Rage went on to be one of the best-selling Sega games.

Streets of Rage was well received. Electronic Gaming Monthly claimed it was "a winner in a category that was lacking on the 16-bit Sega" and "a real version of Double Dragon for the Genesis". The magazine's critics were quick to call it the best fighting game of all time, making it superior to all other titles such as Final Fight; they highlighted its "superb graphics, terrific interaction", huge amount of attacks, and two-player mode, and called its music "funkadelic" and rivaling Sonic the Hedgehog. Mega Play's four reviewers also called it the best all-time fighting, praising the graphics, soundtrack, and described the gameplay as "street fighting action at its best!"

MegaTech magazine review said it had "excellent sprites, backdrops and brilliant music. Add in great gameplay and simultaneous two-player action and you've got an essential buy." Mega placed the game at Number 6 in its Top Mega Drive Games of All Time. Reviewing the game in Sega Arcade Classics for the Sega CD, Glenn Rubenstein wrote in 1993 it "still holds up well." Mega Zone's Brian Costelloe magazine cited the music, level backgrounds and boss fights. He called the music the "most hyped" of all-time, its shipyard graphics the best on the consoles. He and Electronic Gaming Monthly were amazed by the large size of the boss.

== Legacy ==
Streets of Rage was followed by three sequels, Streets of Rage 2, Streets of Rage 3 and Streets of Rage 4. There were plans for two further sequels, one of which was developed by Core Design for the Sega Saturn, but Sega pulled the Streets of Rage name during development after a disagreement with Core about porting it to rival formats; the game was eventually released as Fighting Force. A fourth true game in the series, Streets of Rage 4, was developed by Lizardcube and Guard Crush Games, released by Dotemu under license from Sega on April 30, 2020.

=== Comics ===
Three six-part comic strip series based upon the games appeared in Sonic the Comic in the early 1990s (along with several other adaptations of popular Sega franchises). The first two of these were written by Mark Millar, who has since become popular writing The Authority for Wildstorm, and Ultimate X-Men and The Ultimates for Marvel, while the third (along with a Poster Mag story) was written by Nigel Kitching. Peter Richardson produced the artwork for all nineteen episodes. These three stories are based on Streets of Rage 2 and do not feature Adam. A graphic novel compilation of the original 5-part "Streets of Rage" strip was released as a book called "Streets of Rage: Bad City Fighters" in the UK in 1994.

The first story, entitled simply Streets of Rage, appeared in STC #7–12 and involved Axel, Blaze, and Max quitting the highly corrupt police force to do more good as vigilantes, taking down Max's ex-partner, the crime lord and martial artist Hawk.

The next serial, Skates' Story, appeared in STC #25–30 and introduced Skates, delinquent stepson of Murphy, a friend of Axel and his team and one of the few honest cops left on the force, who was unwillingly drawn into joining Axel's group after his parents were killed by Mr. X.

A special one-off story, called The Facts of Life, appeared in "Sonic the Poster Mag" #7 and involved the heroes causing a racket by fighting one of the many street gangs in a sleeping neighborhood. The police arrive and arrest the thugs, as well as take the heroes to a junkyard for execution. Along the way, Axel explains why he, Blaze, and Max quit the force to a young rookie officer. At the junkyard, just as the officers are about to shoot Max, the rookie officer unlocks Blaze's handcuffs, who proceeds to beat the stuffing out of the cops, with Axel, Skates, and Max following shortly. After the dust clears, the rookie officer says he has seen the true colors of the police force and requests that Axel hit him. Axel does so until Blaze tells him to stop, and they and Max and Skates leave as dawn breaks.

The third and final serial, called The Only Game In Town, appeared in STC #41–46 and involved the Syndicate unleashing an army of street gangs on the heroes, with the event turned into a gambling event as Mr. X opened a book based on whether or not the heroes would reach the river without being killed first. This ploy was played against the villain when Blaze bet $20,000 on her team's survival at odds of a thousand to one. This third story was notable for revealing that, for his failure, the old Mr. X was the victim of a "swimming accident" and had been replaced with a new one by the Syndicate at the story's end. Like many non-Sonic stories in this magazine, the story had a cliff-hanger ending, with the new Mr. X promising that he would "recoup his losses" and kill the heroes.

=== Soundtrack ===
The game's soundtrack was acclaimed, with several soundtrack albums being released. The soundtrack was composed by Yuzo Koshiro.

When the game began development in 1990, Koshiro was influenced by electronic dance music, specifically house and techno, and wanted to introduce those sounds to video games. The soundtrack also shows the influence of contemporary R&B and hip hop music. Koshiro said "the most important element in recreating club music sounds for the games was to emulate the timbre and percussion sounds of Roland's rhythm machines" (the most famous models being the TR-606, TR-707, TR-808, and TR-909), stating "it wouldn't be an exaggeration to say that that sound defined the genre."

Koshiro was influenced by "the swinging rhythms that characterized breakbeats," especially the "ground beat" (used in Ippu-Do's "Sail On" in 1983, Soul II Soul's "Keep On Movin'" in 1989, and Enigma's "Sadeness" in 1990) which inspired "The Street of Rage" title track.

Koshiro went on to compose the sequel's soundtrack. Another musician, Motohiro Kawashima, helped on the second game, providing a few tracks, and making more for the third. Three soundtrack CDs were released in all, each of which now sell for high prices at auction and in Japanese markets.

=== Animation ===
In 2014, Sega formed the production company Stories International and teamed up with film producer Evan Cholfin for animated projects based on its games, with Streets of Rage one of them.
