= Yuzo Koshiro =

Japanese composer (born 1967)

- 古代 祐三
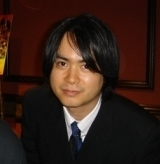
- Koshiro in 2006
- Born: December 12, 1967 (age 58); Tokyo, Japan
- Occupation: Composer
- Years active: 1986–present
- Employers: Nihon Falcom (1986–1988); Ancient (1990–present)
- Musical career
- Genres: Chiptune; rock; EDM; jazz; symphonic
- Instruments: Synthesizer; piano
- Website: Ancient.co.jp

Yuzo Koshiro (古代 祐三, Koshiro Yūzō; born December 12, 1967) is a Japanese video game composer. He is often regarded as one of the most influential innovators in chiptune and video game music, producing music in a number of genres including rock, jazz, symphonic, and various electronic genres such as house, electro, techno, and trance. He and his sister Ayano founded the game development company Ancient in 1990, of which he remains the president.

Koshiro has been cited as creating some of the most memorable game music of the 1980s and 1990s contributing to games such as Nihon Falcom's Dragon Slayer and Ys series, as well as Sega's The Revenge of Shinobi and Streets of Rage series. The soundtracks for the latter have been called "revolutionary" and "ahead of their time" by some critics.

== Early life ==
Koshiro was born in Hino, Tokyo, Japan, on December 12, 1967. His mother, Tomo Koshiro, was a pianist. She taught him how to play the piano at the age of three, and by the age of five, he had a strong command of it. In 1975, he began taking music lessons from Joe Hisaishi and studied with him for three years. Everything Koshiro has learned after that has since been self-taught.

While he was still in high school during the early 1980s, Koshiro began composing music on the NEC PC-8801 as a hobby, including mockups of early arcade game music from Namco, Konami, and Sega. The sequencing skills and experience he gained from this would later be utilized in his early video game projects. The video games that influenced him most were The Tower of Druaga (1984), Space Harrier (1985), and Gradius (1985). The video game music soundtracks to these games inspired him to become a video game composer.

In a 1992 interview, Koshiro said that his favorite music genres are new wave, dance music, technopop, classical, and hard rock, and that his favorite Western bands are Van Halen and Soul II Soul.

== Nihon Falcom (1986–1988) ==
Koshiro's first composing job was with Nihon Falcom in 1986 at the age of 18. Falcom used compositions from the PC-8801 demo tape he had sent them in their Dragon Slayer action role-playing game Xanadu Scenario II, for its opening theme and several dungeon levels. He also wrote the opening song in Romancia that same year. His compositions for these early games were influenced by arcade game music and Japanese bands such as The Alfee. He then produced the soundtrack to Dragon Slayer IV / Legacy of the Wizard (1987), which was influenced by the sounds of early Konami games. His most well-known Falcom works are his soundtracks for Sorcerian (1987) and the early Ys games, Ys I (1987) and Ys II (1988). These early music productions mainly featured rock and fusion music. The TurboGrafx-CD versions of the first three Ys games (from 1989 to 1991) are notable for their very early use of Red Book audio in video games. Music from the Ys games were also employed in the Ys OVA.

All of these early soundtracks were produced using the FM synthesis sound chip of the PC-8801. Despite later advances in audio technology, Koshiro would continue to use older PC-8801 hardware to produce many of his later video game soundtracks, including the Streets of Rage and Etrian Odyssey soundtracks. His soundtracks for early Nihon Falcom games, such as the Dragon Slayer and Ys series, are widely regarded as some of the most influential role-playing video game scores.

== Early freelance work (1988–1990) ==
Following his separation with Falcom, Koshiro became a freelancer, composing music for many other companies. His early freelance projects included the X68000 port of Bosconian, Bothtec's action role-playing game The Scheme (1988) for the NEC PC-8801, and Enix's visual novel adventure game Misty Blue for the PC-9801 in 1990. The latter two soundtracks featured early Eurobeat music.

His most notable freelance work was for Sega: his first freelance work for the company was the soundtrack to The Revenge of Shinobi (1989), for which he produced house and "progressive, catchy, techno-style compositions" that fused electronic dance music with traditional Japanese music.

His soundtrack for ActRaiser (1990), on the other hand, was mainly classical and orchestral. While working on ActRaiser, in order to get around the Super NES's 64 KB memory limitation which limited the number of instruments that can be used and prevented the reloading of samples, Koshiro developed a sample loading system that worked with the ROM cartridge memory, swapping samples from the ROM data on the fly. This allowed him to "load parts of the music gradually as needed, and also change it quickly between stages or parts of a stage" which the "original system couldn't do it with its restrictions." A similar system was used by other companies for later SNES games such as Squaresoft's Trials of Mana (1995) and Namco Tales Studio's Tales of Phantasia (1995).

== Founding of Ancient Corp. (1990–1994) ==
In 1990, Koshiro helped found Ancient Corp. The company was co-founded by his mother, Tomo Koshiro, while his sister Ayano Koshiro works at the company as an art/character/graphic designer and was also the art designer for the ActRaiser games. His sister Ayano has designed characters and graphics for several games Koshiro has worked on, including the Streets of Rage (Bare Knuckle in Japan) series, Ys, and ActRaiser.

While working with Ancient, he composed the soundtrack for the 8-bit version of Sonic the Hedgehog in 1991. He adapted several pieces of music from the original 16-bit version, while the rest of the soundtrack consisted of his own original music.

His soundtracks for the Streets of Rage series (known as Bare Knuckle in Japan) from 1991 to 1994 were composed using then outdated PC-8801 hardware alongside his own original audio programming language. According to Koshiro: "For Bare Knuckle I used the PC88 and an original programming language I developed myself. The original was called MML, Music Macro Language. It is based on NEC's BASIC program, but I modified it heavily. It was more a BASIC-style language at first, but I modified it to be something more like Assembly. I called it ‘Music Love'. I used it for all the Bare Knuckle games."

The soundtracks for Streets of Rage (1991) and Streets of Rage 2 (1992) were influenced by house, techno, hardcore techno, breakbeat, funk and ethnic music. He also attempted to reproduce the Roland TR-808 and TR-909 beats and Roland TB-303 synths using FM synthesis. The soundtrack for Streets of Rage 2 in particular is considered "revolutionary" and ahead of its time, for its "amazing blend of swaggering house synths, dirty" electro-funk and "trancey electronic textures that would feel as comfortable in a nightclub as a video game." The soundtrack also features contributions by Motohiro Kawashima, who also worked at Ancient at the time.

His CD soundtracks became best-sellers in Japan during the early 1990s. In 1993, Electronic Games listed the first two Streets of Rage games as having some of the best video game music soundtracks they "ever heard." They described Koshiro as "just about universally acknowledged as the most gifted composer currently working in the video game field."

Koshiro composed the soundtrack to Streets of Rage 3 (1994), along with colleague Kawashima who contributed in a larger capacity than in 2. He created a new composition method called the "Automated Composing System" to produce "fast-beat techno like jungle." It was the most advanced techno technique of the time, incorporating heavily randomized sequences. This resulted in innovative and experimental sounds generated automatically that, according to Koshiro, "you ordinarily never could imagine on your own." This method was very rare at the time, but has since become popular among techno and trance music producers to get "unexpected and odd sounds." The soundtrack also had elements of abstract, experimental, gabber, and trance music. The experimental electronic music was not very well received upon release, but has since been considered to be ahead of its time. According to Mean Machines, "ironically it pre-dated the 'trance' era that came a short while after release."

Koshiro was one of the first composers credited under his real name in a time when several other Japanese developers were credited under pen names.

== Later career (1994–present) ==
Also in 1994, Koshiro co-composed the soundtrack with Kawashima for the Mega-CD version of Eye of the Beholder, a dungeon crawl role-playing video game ported over from the original by Japanese developer Opera House and published by Sega. That same year, his soundtrack for Beyond Oasis utilized a late romantic style of music, which he later also utilized for Legend of Oasis (1996), Merregnon (2004), and Warriors of the Lost Empire (2007). He also contributed one track to Terranigma (1995).

He also composed the soundtrack for Sega's Shenmue (1999) alongside Takenobu Mitsuyoshi and various others, with Koshiro contributing fifteen original compositions to the soundtrack. Three other staff members of Ancient also worked on Shenmue. He later composed the soundtracks for the Wangan Midnight series (2001 onwards) and Namco × Capcom (2005). These were the first projects where he wrote the lyrics along with the music. For the Wangan Midnight series in particular, his compositions were mostly trance music, a style he was previously unfamiliar with.

He composed the main theme of the French TV channel Nolife, which launched in 2007. The theme was released as part of the album Tamiuta in 2008. Some of Koshiro's latest work includes music for the Etrian Odyssey series, the Wangan Midnight series, and the 7th Dragon series. In 2018, Koshiro contributed one song to Nobuhiko Okamoto's album Braverthday. He was brought back to compose for Streets of Rage 4 in 2020, along with Kawashima and several others. The same year, he composed the theme song "Koroneraiser Inu-More!" for Hololive's virtual YouTuber Inugami Korone. Koshiro also created the opening and ending jingles for the YouTube channel Masahiro Sakurai on Creating Games.

== Notable works ==
Year	Title	Role(s)
1986	Xanadu Scenario II	Music with Takahito Abe
1986	Romancia	Opening theme
1987	Ys I: Ancient Ys Vanished	Music with Mieko Ishikawa
1987	Legacy of the Wizard	Music with Mieko Ishikawa
1987	Sorcerian	Music with several others
1988	Ys II: Ancient Ys Vanished – The Final Chapter	Music with Mieko Ishikawa and Hideya Nagata
1988	The Return of Ishtar	Music; MSX version
1989	The Revenge of Shinobi	Music
1989	Bosconian	Music with Hideya Nagata; X68000 version
1990	Misty Blue	Music
1990	ActRaiser	Music
1991	The G.G. Shinobi	Music
1991	Streets of Rage	Music
1991	Sonic the Hedgehog	Music; Master System / Game Gear version
1992	Super Adventure Island	Music
1992	Eye of the Beholder	Music with Shinji Hosoe; PC-98 version
1992	The G.G. Shinobi II: The Silent Fury	Music with Motohiro Kawashima
1992	Streets of Rage 2	Music with Motohiro Kawashima
1993	Slap Fight MD	Music, arrangements
1993	ActRaiser 2	Music
1994	Streets of Rage 3	Music with Motohiro Kawashima
1994	Eye of the Beholder	Music with Motohiro Kawashima; Sega CD version
1994	Beyond Oasis	Producer, music
1995	Terranigma	"Genius's Playground"
1996	Zork I: The Great Underground Empire	Music with Motohiro Kawashima; PlayStation version
1996	The Legend of Oasis	Music, producer
1997	Culdcept	Music with Takeshi Yanagawa
1999	Shenmue	Music with several others
2001	Wangan Midnight Maximum Tune	Music
2001	Shenmue II	Music with several others
2001	Car Battler Joe	Music with Tomonori Hayashibe
2004	Amazing Island	Music with Motohiro Kawashima and Tomonori Hayashibe
2004	Wangan Midnight Maximum Tune	Music
2005	Wangan Midnight Maximum Tune 2	Music
2005	Namco × Capcom	Opening and ending themes
2005	Dance Dance Revolution Extreme 2	"You Gotta Move It"
2006	The Law of Ueki	Music with Motohiro Kawashima and Takeshi Yanagawa; PlayStation 2 version
2006	Castlevania: Portrait of Ruin	Music with Michiru Yamane
2007	Etrian Odyssey	Music
2007	Wangan Midnight Maximum Tune 3	Music
2007	Katekyo Hitman Reborn! Dream Hyper Battle!	Music with Motohiro Kawashima and Takeshi Yanagawa
2008	Super Smash Bros. Brawl	Arrangements (Note: "Main Theme" (The Legend of Zelda), "Norfair")
2008	Etrian Odyssey II	Music
2009	7th Dragon	Music
2009	Half-Minute Hero	Music with several others
2010	Dragon Ball Online	Music
2010	Etrian Odyssey III	Music
2010	Protect Me Knight	Music
2010	Jaseiken Necromancer: Nightmare Reborn	Music with Takeshi Yanagawa
2010	Criminal Girls	Opening theme
2011	7th Dragon 2020	Music
2011	Wangan Midnight Maximum Tune 4	Music
2012	Kid Icarus: Uprising	Music with several others (Note: Motoi Sakuraba, Masafumi Takada, Noriyuki Iwadare, Takahiro Nishi, and Yasunori Mitsuda)
2012	Etrian Odyssey IV	Music
2012	Layton Brothers: Mystery Room	Music with Takeshi Yanagawa
2012	Time and Eternity	Music with Takeshi Yanagawa
2013	7th Dragon 2020-II	Music
2013	Etrian Odyssey Untold: The Millennium Girl	Music
2013	Code of Joker	"Shine Radiantly", "Innate Ability"
2014	Wangan Midnight Maximum Tune 5	Music
2014	Persona Q: Shadow of the Labyrinth	"Disturbances - The One Called from Beyond"
2014	Gotta Protectors	Music with several others (Note: Hisayoshi Ogura, Motoaki Furukawa, Shinji Hosoe, and Hiroshi Kawaguchi)
2014	Super Smash Bros. for Nintendo 3DS and Wii U	Arrangements (Note: "Battle! (Trainer Battle)" (Pokémon X / Pokémon Y), "Wrath of the Reset Bomb", "PAC-MAN")
2014	Etrian Odyssey 2 Untold: The Fafnir Knight	Music
2015	Etrian Mystery Dungeon	Music with Takeshi Yanagawa
2015	Chunithm	"Grab Your Sword"
2015	7th Dragon III Code: VFD	Music
2015	Project X Zone 2	Opening and ending themes
2016	Puzzle & Dragons X	Music with Kenji Ito, Akira Yamaoka, and Keigo Ozaki
2016	Etrian Odyssey V	Music
2017	Etrian Mystery Dungeon 2	Music
2018	A Certain Magical Virtual-On	Music
2018	Secret of Mana	Arrangements with several others
2018	Chrono Ma:Gia	Music
2018	Wangan Midnight Maximum Tune 6	Music
2018	Etrian Odyssey Nexus	Music
2018	Monster Boy and the Cursed Kingdom	Music with several others (Note: Motoi Sakuraba, Michiru Yamane, Keiki Kobayashi, and Takeshi Yanagawa)
2018	Super Smash Bros. Ultimate	Arrangements (Note: "Now or Never!", "Guile Stage", "Psycho Soldier Theme", "Toys on a Tear", "Opening-Bombing Mission", "Tiger! Tiger!")
2019	SolSeraph	Opening theme
2019	Sega Genesis Mini	Menu theme; dedicated console
2019	Gotta Protectors: Cart of Darkness	Music
2019	The TakeOver	Opening stage theme
2020	Gibiate	Anime
2020	Streets of Rage 4	Music with several others
2020	The Wonderful 101: Remastered	Arrangements with several others
2021	Actraiser Renaissance	Music, arrangements
2021	Royal Anapoko Academy	"As God and As Man"
2022	Sol Cresta	Music
2022	Sin Chronicle	"Hikari・Kibou"
2022	Sega Genesis Mini 2	Menu theme; dedicated console
2023	Cubic Stars	Main theme
2025	Earthion	Music, game direction
2025	Shinobi: Art of Vengeance	Music with Tee Lopes
2026	Mina the Hollower	"Rolling Steam (Spiral Summit)", "Theory of Everything (Mirror's End)"
