= XL Middleton =

American record producer and DJ (born 1982)

- Born: Matthew T. Hudgins; March 1, 1982 (age 44); Pasadena, CA, U.S.
- Other names: XL Middleton; Big China Mack; Xtra Large; Matthew Middleton
- Occupations: Record producer; DJ; entrepreneur
- Years active: 2000–present
- Website: xlmiddleton.com

Matthew T. Hudgins (born March 1, 1982), known by his stage name XL Middleton, is an American modern G-funk record producer and DJ. He is also a co-founder and co-owner of the record label MoFunk, which releases boogie and funk recordings.

== Discography ==
=== Studio albums ===
- XL Middleton + Young Sau There Goes The Neighborhood (2010)
- Tap Water (2015)
- XL Middleton + Eddy Funkster (2016)
- Things Are Happening (2017)
- 2 Minutes Till Midnight (2019)
- XL Middleton & Delmar Xavier VII (2021)

=== Singles ===
- "Music 4 A Drunken Evening" (2004) with Dazzie Dee
- "One Hit Away" (2009) with Crooked I and BQ
- "Back To L.A." (2014)
