= Motohiro Kawashima =

Japanese music producer and DJ

- Born: Nagoya City, Aichi Prefecture, Japan
- Genres: Chiptune; techno
- Occupations: Composer; DJ
- Years active: 1992–present
- Website: Mvorak

Motohiro Kawashima (川島 基宏, Kawashima Motohiro) is a Japanese music producer and DJ. He is best known for his collaborations with composer Yuzo Koshiro on several video games, such as Streets of Rage 2 and Streets of Rage 3.

== Biography ==
Kawashima was born in Nagoya City, Aichi Prefecture, Japan. He grew up listening to artists such as George Gershwin, Ryuichi Sakamoto, and Haruomi Hosono. He later moved to Tokyo and got interested in techno culture. During his time at Kunitachi College of Music he began producing techno music and was introduced to Yuzo Koshiro, who was looking for staff at his company, Ancient. He would go on to join his company in 1992, where he composed for Shinobi II: The Silent Fury and the Game Gear and Master System versions of Batman Returns, with Koshiro assisting him on both projects. The two would work together again for Streets of Rage 2 and Streets of Rage 3, with him composing approximately half of the latter's soundtrack. During this time they would also frequently go to nightclubs together for musical inspiration.

In addition to his work on video games, Kawashima has also composed for other productions, including songs for artists, commercials and anime. He currently works as a lecturer in the computer music department at Kuntachi College of Music. In 2010, he used the pen name Kashii while working as a commissioned composer for the music label D-topia Entertainment, as part of the duo Kylie & Kashii. He would also compose for the Brandon Sheffield-designed game Oh, Deer!, which released in 2015. He also returned to compose for Streets of Rage 4 (2020) along with Koshiro and several others.

Kawashima has also released solo albums of instrumental electronic music, including Prepared Wave (2019) and Acrobatizm (2023).

== Works ==
=== Video games ===
Year	Title	Notes
1992	Gage	Music with Yuzo Koshiro and Ayako Yoda
1992	Batman Returns	Sega 8-bit versions; music
1992	The G.G. Shinobi II: The Silent Fury	Music with Yuzo Koshiro
1992	Streets of Rage 2	Music with Yuzo Koshiro
1994	Streets of Rage 3	Music with Yuzo Koshiro
1994	Eye of the Beholder	Mega CD version; music with Yuzo Koshiro
1995	Manji: Psy Yuuki	Music with Yuzo Koshiro and Ayako Yoda
1996	Zork I: The Great Underground Empire	Music with Yuzo Koshiro
1996	Vatlva	Music with Yuzo Koshiro
1998	Fox Junction	Music with Yuzo Koshiro and Ryuji Iuchi
2003	Group S Challenge	Music with TJD, Takeshi Yanagawa and C‑Robots
2004	Amazing Island	Music with Yuzo Koshiro and Tomonori Hayashibe
2006	The Law of Ueki	Music with Yuzo Koshiro and Takeshi Yanagawa
2007	Katekyo Hitman Reborn! Dream Hyper Battle!	Music with Yuzo Koshiro and Takeshi Yanagawa
2008	Katekyo Hitman Reborn! Battle Arena	Music with Takeshi Yanagawa
2009	Katekyo Hitman Reborn! Battle Arena 2	Music with Takeshi Yanagawa
2010	Dead Heat	Music with Yuzo Koshiro
2013	Momoiro Billionaire!	Music with Yuzo Koshiro
2015	Oh, Deer!	Music
2020	Streets of Rage 4	Music with various others

=== Other ===
Year	Title	Notes
2002	Pour La Vie / Fuschia	Music
2005	Mure ni Kaerenai Tori / Akiko Kawase	"D-Day"
2005	Colorful / Saori Gotō	"Angel Sign"
2008	Chaos;Head	"Blood Tune" and "ESO"; with tOkyO
2010	Kor=girl I / Kor=girl	"Nanba"
2010	Three Questions / Aira Mitsuki	"Human Future"
2011	×~Park of the Safari / Aira Mitsuki x Saori@destiny	"Gate or Exit"
