= Streets of Rage 3 =

1994 video game

- North American cover art
- Developer: Sega
- Publisher: Sega
- Producers: Ossiy, Noriyuki, Maxwell Taylor
- Designer: Yui
- Programmer: Hiroshi Momota
- Composers: Yuzo Koshiro; Motohiro Kawashima
- Series: Streets of Rage
- Platform: Genesis
- Release: JP: March 18, 1994; NA: 1994; EU: July 22, 1994
- Genre: Beat 'em up
- Modes: Single-player, multiplayer

Streets of Rage 3 (Note: Known in Japan as Bare Knuckle III (ベア・ナックルIII, Bea Nakkuru Surī)) is a 1994 beat 'em up game developed and published by Sega for the Genesis. It is the third installment of the Streets of Rage series and the last game in the original trilogy. The game includes several changes over Streets of Rage and Streets of Rage 2, such as a more complex plot, inclusion of character dialogue, longer levels, more in-depth scenarios and faster gameplay. Weapons can be integrated with unique moves with certain characters, hidden characters were added, and a few cutscenes were included to give the story greater depth.

It was later released for the Japanese version of Sonic Gems Collection for the GameCube, PlayStation 2 and the Wii Virtual Console in September 2007. The game also appeared in Sonic's Ultimate Genesis Collection for Xbox 360 and PlayStation 3. The game also appeared in Sega Genesis Classics for PlayStation 4, Xbox One, and Nintendo Switch.

== Gameplay ==
Gameplay screenshot, with the player engaged in combat

Much like the previous two games, Streets of Rage 3 is a side-scrolling beat 'em up in which up to two players fight against waves of enemies. Players can choose from returning characters Axel, Blaze, and Skate, along with a new character named Dr. Zan, a robot who automatically converts every weapon picked up into a ball of energy. By fulfilling certain conditions, two bonus characters, Shiva and Roo (known as Victy in Japan), can be unlocked for play, with a third unlockable character, Ash, being exclusive to the Japanese release.

Several tweaks have been made to the gameplay following Streets of Rage 2. Whereas only Skate was able to run in the previous game, now each character is able to run, as well as perform a vertical dodge roll. Blitz attacks can be upgraded through successive play, and a rechargeable meter allows players to perform a Special attack without losing any health when full. Certain weapons now have special attacks that can be performed in the same way as Blitz attacks. However, all weapons now have a limited number uses before they break, and unlockable characters are unable to hold weapons at all.

Stages in the game include hazards, originally featured in the first Streets of Rage, such as bottomless pits. Some stages have alternate routes depending on certain actions, such as whether players can clear a room of enemies before a non-playable character is killed by poisonous gas. Enemy AI was also expanded so more enemies can pick up weapons, block attacks, employ co-operative attacks, and even steal exposed food items to regain health. Compared to the Japanese version, the Western release of this game features altered graphics and sound effects, and increased difficulty, and does not feature Ash as a playable character. Like the previous game, a Battle mode lets two players fight against each other.

== Plot ==
After being defeated twice, Syndicate crime boss Mr. X has started a research company called RoboCy Corporation to act as a cover for his illegal activities. The world's best roboticist, Dr. Dahm (Dr. Zero in Japan), has been brought in to help him create an army of realistic robots to replace important officials from Wood Oak City. With the replacements in place, Mr. X plans to run the city using a remote control device. His criminal organization, The Syndicate, has strategically placed bombs around the city to distract the police while the city officials are dealt with. Dr. Zan discovers what the research is really for and knows the Syndicate must be stopped. He contacts Blaze Fielding with the details of The Syndicate's plan. Blaze quickly contacts her old comrades Axel Stone and Adam Hunter for a task force to bring down The Syndicate once and for all. Axel quickly joins the task force, but Adam cannot make it due to his own assignments from within the police, and sends his younger brother, Eddie "Skate" Hunter instead.

The game has four endings depending on the difficulty setting and if the player completes certain stages in an allotted amount of time. In the game's true ending, from which the events of Streets of Rage 4 follow, it is revealed that the real Chief Ivan Petrov was kidnapped and replaced with a duplicate. After Ivan is freed, Axel suggests Adam take Ivan to the city hall before his doppelgänger arrives, then goes to Mr. X's robot factory hideout in the forest. Once Dr. Dahm is apprehended and confesses to the government officials' kidnapping and replacement, the real Mr. X is revealed to be reduced to nothing but a brain in a laboratory capsule, controlling all the robots with his mind. As the heroes destroy Mr. X's brain capsule and his Robot Y, the bomb timers are neutralized. The dying Mr. X attempts to self destruct the lab to kill the heroes, but they are rescued by Adam. With Mr. X gone, RoboCy becomes defunct, Dr. Dahm is left to recover at an asylum, and Dr. Zan's name is cleared.

== Characters ==
Three of the playable characters from former games return in the sequel: Axel Stone, Blaze Fielding, and Eddie "Skate" Hunter (Sammy Hunter in the Japanese version), each of which have their respective strengths and weaknesses. Dr. Zan replaces Max from the second game, with any weapon he picks up turning into a ball of energy. Adam from the first game makes a story cameo, and Max only makes a cameo appearance in the game's "good" ending.

Three of the game's boss characters can also be accessed through in-game codes. The first mid-boss, a homosexual character named Ash, was removed from the Western releases of the game (although he can be accessed through cheat cartridges). Shiva, the martial artist who debuted in Streets of Rage 2 and newcomer Roo (Victy in the Japanese version) the kangaroo can also be accessed. Shiva, Roo, and Ash are unable to use weapons, which also serves as a main inspiration for Shiva's unique mechanics in Streets of Rage 4, where he is also a DLC playable character.

== Development and release ==
Several pre-release screenshots show that there was originally a section where the players got to ride the motorcycles they are so often attacked by. This section was removed for the final version, but is still playable (though buggy and unfinished) with a Game Genie code in the Japanese version.

=== Version differences ===
When the game was localized from the original Japanese version to the English-language release, significant changes were made. The clothing of the three returning heroes (Axel, Blaze, and Sammy) was altered from their original colors seen in previous Streets of Rage games, the female enemy characters wore less-revealing outfits, and a sub-boss named "Ash", a gay stereotype, was removed from the English version (though he is still accessible in Streets of Rage 3 as a playable character via cheating and/or hacking). The voice-effects were also changed, with most noticeably Axel's catchphrase of "Grand Upper" for his blitz move being replaced with "Bare Knuckle".

Another notable difference between the two games is the plot: The Japanese version of the story opens with a new explosive substance called "Raxine", (Note: This is the romanized spelling used in the English version of Project X Zone 2. The original Japanese spelling is ラクシン (rakushin), which was used romanized in the Bare Knuckle 3 fan translation.) discovered by a character named Dr. Gilbert (who is revealed to be the true identity of Dr. Zan), which explodes in the city and kills thousands of people. At the same time, a military general named Ivan Petrov vanishes. It is later discovered that Mr. X orchestrated the general's disappearance and plans to use Raxine to start a global war.

In the English version, all references to Raxine were removed, General Petrov was replaced by the city's Chief of Police, and the plot now involves a scheme to switch major city officials with robot clones in order to take control of the city. Another difference was if the player failed to save the general, the player has to head to what appears to be the White House. This too was changed in the English adaptation, where instead if the player failed to save the Chief, then the player has to head to City Hall, although the building depicting the City Hall is still clearly based on the White House. The bad ending sequence from the Japanese releases features a photo of a devastated city as text narrates the player's failure; this was removed in the Western releases and text scrolls upward on a black background. The credits were removed from the bad ending of the Western version (possibly to show that it was not the true ending), whereas in the Japanese version they still play.

The game's overall difficulty was also altered for the English version, with the game's Normal setting being significantly more difficult than even the Japanese version's Hard setting. Also, the English version of the game cannot be completed on the Easy setting (it will end after Stage 5). Axel and Skate are noticeably absent from the European box art, while the new character Zan appears alongside Blaze. This is because the box art for the game was originally used as a magazine cover art that Sega of Europe bought later to be used. Another significant difference between versions is that the Special attacks consume less of the player's health in the English version.

=== Soundtrack ===
Streets of Rage 3 – "Boss" (1994)
"Boss" from Streets of Rage 3 (1994) demonstrating elements of electro, house, techno and jungle.

The soundtrack was composed by Yuzo Koshiro and Motohiro Kawashima, who had both worked on Streets of Rage 2. It features influences from Detroit's hard techno scene which was popular in Tokyo nightclubs at the time of the game's development. For the soundtrack, Koshiro created a new composition method called the "Automated Composing System" to produce "fast-beat techno like jungle." It was among the most advanced electronic music creation technique at the time, incorporating heavily randomized sequences. This resulted in sounds generated automatically that, according to Koshiro, "you ordinarily never could imagine on your own." The soundtrack incorporates "fast-paced percussion", and "wailing hyper-melodic synths", with "atonal shards of algorithmic experimentation". Fact wrote that the soundtrack foreshadowed trance, gabber and the work of later experimental electronic musicians.

=== Re-releases ===
The Japanese version of Sonic Gems Collection includes Bare Knuckle I, II, III (Streets of Rage 1, 2 and 3). These are excluded from releases outside Japan to obtain lower age ratings. Streets of Rage 3 later appeared alongside its other games in Sonic's Ultimate Genesis Collection, and in Sega Genesis Classics. On May 3, 2012, Streets of Rage 3 was released on Valve's Steam platform, both as a stand-alone game as well as part of the Sega Genesis Classics Pack 5. A Streets of Rage Collection, which released under the Sega Vintage Collection series in 2012, features the original trilogy and allows the player to choose between the Japanese, European, or North American versions of them. Streets of Rage 3 is included in the North American and European models of the Genesis Mini 2 microconsole released on October 27, 2022. Although the Japanese Bare Knuckle III, not featured on the Japanese Mega Drive 2 Mini, can be played by changing the language settings, the section in which players can fight against and unlock Ash has been removed from this version of the game.

== Reception ==
Reception

Aggregate score
Aggregator	Score
GameRankings	83%

Review scores
Publication	Score
Electronic Gaming Monthly	29/40
Game Informer	8/10
GameFan	234/300
Hyper	83%
Mean Machines Sega	83%
Superjuegos	86/100
Video Games (DE)	77%
Mega	72%
Sega Magazine	90/100

GamePro commented that the game is little different from previous entries in the series, but praised the new moves and support for the six-button controller. The four reviewers of Electronic Gaming Monthly praised the new moves and larger levels, though two of them criticized that the soundtrack was well below Yuzo Koshiro's usual standard. Mean Machines Sega said the game had easily outdone the graphics of the first two Streets of Rage games due to the larger sprites, but had failed to significantly advance the gameplay of the series. They concluded it to be overall fun and playable, albeit too easy. Digital Press gave it 8 out of 10. Mega said it was "uninspiring and easy to finish", but later placed the game at #25 in their Top Mega Drive Games of All Time. Diehard GameFan praised the gameplay and graphics, but took exception to the localization, saying it "neutered" an otherwise fine title, advising readers to import the Japanese version or pass it up entirely. They also were very critical of the music.

The soundtrack, which was created through a semi-random process, was divisive. Mean Machines wrote that it was "terrible". In 2018, the Fact editor John Twells wrote: "When you're forced to hear snippets again and again, the atonal shards of algorithmic experimentation can be grating, but listening to the soundtrack as a whole is a different experience altogether: historical, challenging, innovative and artistic ... Whether it's art is subject to debate, but it's definitely techno." Twells described the soundtrack as Koshiro and Kawashima's "crowning achievement" and recommended it to all electronic music fans, even those uninterested in video games.

In a retrospective assessment, Mean Machines commented that the plot is lackluster and the music "takes some getting used to," but the visuals are colorful and beautiful, the levels are varied, and the challenge is more than sufficient. The reviewer concluded, "If you've never played any of the SOR series before, SOR2 is probably a better entry point, but be sure to sample this third outing at some point." In a retrospective review, Colin Williamson of Allgame gave Streets of Rage 3 a review score of 3 out of 5, he praised the game having flashy new moves for the characters but criticizing that there is nothing really new in the game and called the two new characters as "stale". He concluded the review stating: "If you're in need of more bare-knuckle fun, this will suit the bill - just don't expect to be blown away."

== Sequel ==
Streets of Rage 4 was announced by Dotemu in August 2018, and released on April 30, 2020.
