= Sega Power =

Defunct video game magazine 1989-1997

- #73 December 1995
- Editor: Steve Jarratt
- Categories: Video game magazines
- Frequency: Monthly
- First issue: December 1989
- Final issue Number: April 1997; 91
- Company: Future plc
- Country: United Kingdom
- Based in: Bath
- Language: English
- ISSN: 0961-2718

Sega Power, initially known as S: The Sega Magazine, was a Future publication aimed at the Sega range of consoles, including the Master System, Mega Drive, Game Gear and later on the Mega-CD, 32X and Saturn. The magazine was later relaunched as Saturn Power when the other Sega consoles were discontinued.

== S: The Sega Magazine ==
S: The Sega Magazine #9, August 1990

ISSN 0958-3114
Edited by Steve Jarratt, Future plc's early Sega incarnation covered the Master System console and the page count was quite small compared to later issues of Sega Power. Issue 10's cover heralded the arrival of the Mega Drive.

Issue 1 was sent out to owners who had registered their Sega Master Systems via warranty cards, with further early issues only being available via subscription and through select retailers. The launch issue was also obtainable for free with the purchase of a game from selected retailers. After 6 issues the magazine went on general sale.

== Sega Power ==
ISSN 0961-2718
After 12 issues the magazine was re-launched with its new name in readiness for the forecast boom in video games consoles. The magazine covered consoles such as the Mega Drive, Master System, Game Gear, Mega-CD, Sega 32X and the Saturn. In the spring of 1997, after 91 issues, the magazine was relaunched and renamed.

== Saturn Power ==
Saturn Power #1, July 1997

ISSN 1368-0013
With both the Mega Drive and Master System discontinued by 1997, the magazine was relaunched with its new name; Saturn Power. Issue 1 was launched, cover dated June 1997 and came with a cover mounted demo disc. However, the magazine only lasted 10 issues before being pulled; the last being February 1998.

== Cover mounted books ==
As a variation on the free tips booklet often issued by computer games magazines, Sega Power released a string of novellas based on popular computer games. Titles in this range included: Golden Axe, Road Rash, Super Monaco GP and Desert Strike. These titles were written by members of the Sega Power team and combined a fictional narrative, hung loosely around the linear plot of the game, with cheats, codes and hints for gamers.

As a result of the popularity of these stories, rival title Sega Force followed suit and released a spin-off of Super Smash TV, which bore striking similarities to Stephen King's 'The Running Man'.

== See also ==
- Sega Saturn Magazine
- Official Dreamcast Magazine (US)
- Official Dreamcast Magazine (UK)
