= Ancient (company) =

Japanese video game developer

Ancient Corp.
- Native name: 株式会社エインシャント
- Romanized name: Kabushiki gaisha Einshanto
- Type: Private
- Industry: Video games
- Founded: April 1, 1990; 36 years ago
- Founder: Yuzo Koshiro
- Headquarters: Hino, Tokyo, Japan
- Number of employees: 15 (2018)
- Website: www.ancient.co.jp

Ancient Corp. (Note: Japanese: 株式会社エインシャント, Hepburn: Kabushiki gaisha Einshanto) is a Japanese video game developer based in Hino, Tokyo. It was founded on April 1, 1990 by composer Yuzo Koshiro, Ayano Koshiro, and Tomo Koshiro. The company is best known for its work on Streets of Rage 2, Beyond Oasis, the Protect Me Knight/Gotta Protectors series, and the 8-bit version of Sonic the Hedgehog.

== Overview ==
The company was founded when Yuzo, who had worked on the sound for The Super Shinobi, received an inquiry from Sega asking if he could create an entire game. Yuzo was told that taking on the entire game would require a company-wide deal, so he founded the company. Initially, he invited Shinobu Hayashi, an acquaintance from a doujin PC software circle (who later worked on the development of Decathreat at Sega and joined Zenaworks after leaving Sega), to work as a programmer, and formed the company with Ayano, who was in charge of graphics, and four high school classmates. The company was run as a cottage industry (the company's representative was the mother of the Koshiro siblings). The Game Gear version of Sonic the Hedgehog that they developed became a huge hit, and the profits were used to build the company's headquarters.

== Games ==
List of games developed by Ancient
| Year | Title | Publisher | Platform |
|---|---|---|---|
| 1991 | Sonic the Hedgehog | Sega | Master System, Game Gear |
| 1992 | Streets of Rage 2 (Note: Co-developed with Shout! Design Works, MNM Software, and H.I.C.) | Sega | Genesis |
| 1993 | ActRaiser 2 (Note: Co-developed with Quintet) | Enix (Note: Published by Ubisoft in Europe) | Super NES |
| 1994 | Beyond Oasis | Sega | Genesis |
| 1996 | The Legend of Oasis | Sega | Saturn |
| 1996 | Vatlva | JVC | Saturn |
| 1997 | Sega Ages: Columns Arcade Collection | Sega | Saturn |
| 1998 | Sega Saturn de Hakken!! Tamagotchi Park | Bandai | Saturn |
| 1999 | Animetic Story Game 1: Cardcaptor Sakura (Note: Co-developed with Arika) | Arika | PlayStation |
| 2001 | Car Battler Joe | Natsume Inc. (Note: Published by Victor Interactive Software in Japan) | Game Boy Advance |
| 2004 | Amazing Island | Sega | GameCube |
| 2004 | Bobobo-bo Bo-bobo Atsumare!! Taikan Bo-bobo (Note: Co-developed with Hudson Soft) | Hudson Soft | PlayStation 2 |
| 2006 | Ueki no Hōsoku: Taosu ze Roberuto Jūdan!! (Note: Co-developed with Bandai) | Bandai | PlayStation 2 |
| 2006 | Bleach: Hanatareshi Yabou (Note: Co-developed with Sony Computer Entertainment) | Sony Computer Entertainment | PlayStation 2 |
| 2007 | Fuzion Frenzy 2 | Microsoft Game Studios | Xbox 360 |
| 2007 | Katekyoo Hitman Reborn! Dream Hyper Battle! (Note: Co-developed with Marvelous Entertainment) | Marvelous Entertainment | PlayStation 2 |
| 2008 | Katekyoo Hitman Reborn! Battle Arena | Marvelous Entertainment | PlayStation Portable |
| 2009 | Katekyoo Hitman Reborn! Battle Arena 2 | Marvelous Entertainment | PlayStation Portable |
| 2010 | Protect Me Knight | Self-published | Xbox 360 |
| 2010 | Puchi Puchi Time | Self-published | iOS |
| 2014 | Gotta Protectors | Self-published | Nintendo 3DS |
| 2017 | Gotta Protectors: Amazon's Running Diet | Self-published | Nintendo Entertainment System |
| 2019 | Gotta Protectors: Cart of Darkness | 8-4 (Note: Self-published by Ancient in Japan) | Nintendo Switch |
| 2021 | Royal Anapoko Academy | Self-published | Nintendo Switch |
| 2025 | Earthion | Limited Run Games (Note: Ported to Windows, Switch, PlayStation 4, PlayStation 5, and Xbox Series X/S by Bitwave Games) | Genesis, Windows, Switch, PlayStation 4, PlayStation 5, Xbox Series X/S |
