= Sega Force =

Defunct video game magazine 1992-1993

- #1 January 1992
- Editor: Stuart Wynne; Roger Kean (Acting Editor); Chris Knight; Steve Shields (Managing Editor)
- Categories: Video game magazines
- Frequency: Monthly
- First issue: January 1992
- Final issue Number: July 1993; 19
- Company: Europress Impact; Impact Magazines
- Country: United Kingdom
- Language: English
- ISSN: 0964-2552

Sega Force was an early 1990s publication that covered the Sega console range (Sega Mega Drive, Mega-CD, Master System and Game Gear).

== History ==
Sega Force, along with Nintendo Force, was initially announced in mid-1991 by Newsfield. However, the liquidation of the publisher resulted in the magazine being significantly delayed. It was eventually launched by Europress Impact in December 1991.

The magazine featured artwork created by Oliver Frey that was inspired by Japanese anime, such as Akira. Frey often introduced a horror element into his artwork. His artwork for a Lemmings cover replaced the rodents with humans, depicting their horrified faces as they fell to the ground. The title also featured work by Stuart Wynne, Phil King, Steve Shields, Adrian Pitt and Matt Yeo.

The magazine occasionally featured novellas based on console games. Staff writer, Matt Yeo worked in conjunction with Acclaim software to publish a novella based on Super Smash TV. The narrative followed the plot of the computer game closely and at the end of each chapter offered readers hints and tips on how to complete the game. The narrative style was in keeping with the brash violent cartoons used within the title itself - and bore striking similarities to Stephen King's The Running Man. Sega Force's move into computer game fiction is considered to be a response to its rival Sega Power, which had already had success with several books based on computer games.

In 1993, Impact Magazines made the decision to separate the Sega Force and N-Force titles. Sega Force was split into Sega Force Mega (covering the Mega Drive and Mega-CD) and Sega Master Force (covering the Master System). Both titles included a G-Force section covering the Game Gear.

Sega Master Force
- Sega Master Force #1, August 1993
- Editor: Steve Shields (Managing Editor); Nick Roberts
- Categories: Video game magazines
- Frequency: Monthly
- First issue: August 1993
- Final issue Number: December 1993; 6
- Company: Impact Magazines
- Country: United Kingdom
- Language: English

== Sega Master Force ==
Sega Master Force was aimed at the younger market, though it remained readable for older Sega fans. The magazine was edited by Nick Roberts and retained the visual appearance of Sega Force. Six issues of Sega Master Force were published, each featuring 68 pages.

== Sega Force Mega ==
Sega Force Mega was marketed as a grown-up games publication that would better compete with Future's MEGA magazine. The first issues were produced at Europress Impact, but later the magazine was outsourced to a company located in Newton Abbot, while Impact staff moved on to a new magazine, Mega Machines. Each issue of Sega Force Mega featured 100 pages, consisting of news features, reviews, G-Force and a buyers guide. Six issues were published along with a 'special' seventh issue that included past reviews and news.

Sega Force Mega
- Sega Force Mega #1, August 1993
- Editor: Steve Shields (Managing Editor); Mark Smith
- Categories: Video game magazines
- Frequency: Monthly
- First issue: August 1993
- Final issue Number: January 1994; 7
- Company: Impact Magazines
- Country: United Kingdom
- Language: English

=== Sega Force Special ===
The seventh, and what would turn out to be the final, issue of Sega Force Mega was dubbed a "Sega Force Special". The 132-page magazine featured reprints of reviews that had appeared in the previous six issues of Sega Force Mega and Sega Master Force. The preview of Sonic Chaos for the Master System was updated to provide a game rating. In the editorial, Nick Roberts indicated that Sega Force Mega would be 'back to normal' in the following month, but did not mention Sega Master Force. However, issue 8 failed to appear and it was learned that all of Impact's magazines were closed.

== See also ==
- Video game journalism
- Magazine
- Video game
