= List of ninja video games =

The following is an incomplete list of video games which feature ninja, mostly in action and role-playing games, from the early 1980s to the present. It is organized in alphabetical order.

== Game series ==
Series f-lo	Genre	Featured ninja characters/Notes
Aero Fighters	Shoot 'em up	Ninja pilot Hien - shooter game series since 1992
Arc the Lad	Role-playing	Gun-wielding ninja Shu
Arcana Heart	Fighting	Doggirl character Konoha since 2006
Battle Arena Toshinden	Fighting	Mondo - first three games in 1995–1996; Miyabi - Toshinden 4 (1999)
Battle Raper	Fighting	Mai Kisaragi - Battle Raper (2002); Setsuna Yagami - Battle Raper 2 (2003)
BlazBlue	Fighting	Bang Shishigami - BlazBlue: Calamity Trigger (2008), BlazBlue: Continuum Shift (2009), BlazBlue: Continuum Shift II (2010), BlazBlue: Continuum Shift Extend (2012), BlazBlue: Clone Phantasma and BlazBlue: Chronophantasma (2012)
Bleach	Fighting	
Bloody Roar	Fighting	Bakuryu; Kohryu
Bushido Blade	Fighting	Red Shadow; Night Stalker - Bushido Blade 2
Clumsy Ninja	Action-Adventure	Clumsy Ninja
Dance Central	Other	Shinju and Kichi - Dance Central 2 and Dance Central 3
Dead or Alive	Fighting	Ayane - also as a major character in Ninja Gaiden; Hayate; Kasumi - the runaway ninja who is the series' main character since 1996 and also appeared in Ninja Gaiden; Genra,Raidou, and Shiden
Dragon Ninja Rush	Action-adventure	Dragon Ninja Clan in the magical myth and legend
Eternal Champions	Fighting	Shadow Yamato - main character of Eternal Champions (1994), Eternal Champions: Challenge from the Dark Side (1995) and X-Perts (1996)
Far East of Eden	Role-playing	
Fighters Destiny	Fighting	Ninja - Fighters Destiny (1998) and in its 1999 sequel
Final Fantasy / Kingdom Hearts	Role-playing	Edge - Final Fantasy IV (1991); Shadow - Final Fantasy VI (1994); Yuffie Kisaragi - Final Fantasy VII (1997) and spin-offs; "Ninja" is one of the available job classes in Final Fantasy Tactics (1997)
Final Fight	Beat' em up	Guy - first Final Fight (1989); Maki Genryusai - Final Fight 2 (1993)
Flame of Recca	Fighting	
Gatchaman	Various	
Ganbare Goemon (Mystical Ninja)	Various	Ishikawa Goemon, Goemon, Ebisumaru, and Yae
Genji	Action-adventure	Genji: Dawn of the Samurai (2005); Genji: Days of the Blade (2006)
G.I. Joe	Action	Snake Eyes, Storm Shadow, Jinx and Kamakura
Guilty Gear	Fighting	Chipp Zanuff; Answer
House of Dead Ninjas	Platform	Free-to-play games House of Dead Ninjas (2011) and Super House of Dead Ninjas (2012).
I-Ninja	Role-playing/ Platform	I-Ninja
Izuna	Role-playing	Izuna and her friend Shino are hidden characters in the 2010 fighting game Windy X Windam
JaJaMaru	Action	Ninja JaJaMaru-kun (1985); JaJaMaru Gekimaden: Maboroshi no Kinmajou (1990); Ganso JaJaMaru-kun (1999)
Kage no Densetsu	Action	The Legend of Kage (1985), its 2006 remake, and The Legend of Kage 2 (2008).
Kessen	Strategy	Several ninja characters and units are featured in Kessen (2000) and Kessen III (2004).
Killer Instinct	Fighting	Jago; Black Orchid
The King of Fighters	Fighting	Mai Shiranui since 1992 - she was introduced in the Fatal Fury series; Mai's boyfriend Andy Bogard since 1991 - also from the Fatal Fury series, and Eiji Kisaragi since 1994 - from the Art of Fighting series; Lin, Nagase, Ron and Bandeiras Hattori
Kinnikuman Muscle Grand Prix	Fighting	The Ninja (Shounetsu Jigoku)
Kirby	Platform	Waiu - Kirby's Dream Land 2; Kirby (Ninja Ability) - first appeared in Kirby Super Star (1996); Bio Spark - first appeared in Kirby Super Star (1996); Moonja - first appeared in Kirby's Return to Dream Land (2011)
The Last Blade	Fighting	Zantetsu
Last Ninja	Action-adventure	Armakuni, a time-travelling ninja
The Legend of Zelda	Action-adventure	Sheik - the Sheikah ninja
Mark of the Ninja	Stealth	Mute, nameless ninja - referred to as the "Marked Ninja"; Dosai - the elder Hisomu ninja
Mega Man	Platform	Several ninja characters; Shadow Man (Mega Man 3, 1990), Phantom (Mega Man Zero, 2002; Mega Man Star Force 2, 2007; Zerker × Ninja)
Metal Gear	Stealth	Kyle Schneider; Metal Gear 2: Solid Snake; Gray Fox (Metal Gear Solid, 1998); Olga Gurlukovich (Metal Gear Solid 2: Sons of Liberty, 2001); Raiden (Metal Gear Solid 4: Guns of the Patriots, 2008; Metal Gear Rising: Revengeance, 2013)
Mini Ninjas	Action-adventure	Mini Ninjas (2009), Mini Ninjas Adventures (2012)
Mortal Kombat	Fighting	Many ninja characters since 1992 - Scorpion, Sub-Zero, Mileena, Kitana, Jade, Noob Saibot, Cyrax, Sektor, Smoke, Reptile, Ermac, Rain, Skarlet, Tremor and Khameleon.
Naruto	Various	Numerous games based on the hit manga and anime franchise since the early 2000s
N	Platform	N (2004); N+ (2008); N++ (2015)
Ninja Gaiden	Action	Ryu Hayabusa (also in the Dead or Alive games) - arcade and NES games in 1988; Momiji - Ninja Gaiden Dragon Sword (2008), Ninja Gaiden Sigma 2 (2009), Ninja Gaiden 3: Razor's Edge, Dead or Alive 5 Ultimate and Dead or Alive 6.
Lego Ninjago: Nindroids	Puzzle, Fighting, Action	Several main characters are ninja.; The game is about a ninja team.
Lego Ninjago: Shadow of Ronin	Puzzle, Fighting, Action	All of the starting characters are ninja.; You can unlock several other ninja characters as well.; The main characters are all part of a ninja team.
Ninja Master	Action	Ninja Master (1986) and its sequel, Oriental Hero (1987)
Ninja Warriors	Beat 'em up	The Ninja Warriors and The Ninja Warriors Again of 1987-1994 - Ninja and Kunoichi (also Kamaitachi in Again)
Ninja-Kid	Various	Two Ninja-Kid games (1984–1987) as well as Ninja Taro (1991).
Nintama Rantaro	Various	Rantaro and his friends and teachers at the ninja school
Onimusha	Action-adventure	Several playable ninja characters: Kaede (Onimusha: Warlords, 2000; Onimusha Blade Warriors, 2003); Akane "Jubei" Yagyū (Onimusha: Dawn of Dreams, 2006); Kotaro Fuma (based on the historical figure Fuma Kotaro) - Onimusha 2: Samurai's Destiny (2002), Onimusha Tactics (2003)
Pokémon	Various	Nincada, Ninjask, Shedinja, Accelgor, Greninja, and others; Koga - first appeared in Pokémon Red and Green/Red and Blue; Janine - first appeared in Pokémon Gold and Silver
Power Instinct	Fighting	Saizo Hattori - since the first game in 1993; Hizumi Yukinoue - Groove On Fight; Takumi Hattori - Saizo's cousin since 2009.
Power Rangers	Various	
Power Stone	Fighting	Ayame - Power Stone (1999) and Power Stone 2 (2000)
Rumble Roses	Fighting	Benikage (Bloody Shadow) - Rumble Roses and Rumble Roses XX (2004–2006); her alter ego Yasha
Saboteur	Action-adventure	Anonymous ninja in the first game (1985); Nina - the sequel (1987)
Samurai Shodown	Fighting	Several ninja characters - Earthquake, Hanzo Hattori Hattori Hanzō, another Hanzo Hattori), Kazuki Kazama, Sogetsu Kazama, Basara the Executioner, Galford D. Weller, Rasetsu, Iroha, Shiki, Saya, Oboro and Oboro's Amazons.
Savage Reign	Fighting	Gozu and Mezu They return in the sequel Kizuna Encounter (1996), joined by Jyazu.
Sengoku	Beat 'em up	All of the player characters in the third installment are ninjas, as are many of the enemies in all three games released in 1991–2001
Sengoku Ace	Shoot 'em up	Several player and enemy boss characters (1992–2005).
Sengoku Basara	Crowd fighting	Sarutobi Sasuke; Fuma Kotaro; Kasuga
Senran Kagura	Fighting	A series of fan service games that began with Senran Kagura: Skirting Shadows (previously known as Kagura: Portrait of Girls) in 2011.
Sekiro: Shadows Die Twice	Action-Adventure	Main character, Sekiro, referred to as the "one-armed Wolf" is a shinobi
Shadow of the Ninja	Platform	The 1990 original game as well as its 2001 prequel follow-up, Return of the Ninja.
Shadow Tactics: Blades of the Shogun	Top-down Stealth	Hayato is a shinobi or ninja.
Shadow Warrior	First-Person Shooter	The main character, Lo Wang, is a ninja.
Shining Force	Tactical role-playing	A series in which ninja is a fairly common job class.: Hanzou - Shining Force; Slade - Shining Force II (an anthromoprhic rat); Akane and Rodi - Shining the Holy Ark; Baron - Shining Force Neo (an antromoprhic wolf)
Shinobi	Action	Joe Musashi - from the Oboro clan, or his relatives; Hotsuma (and his brother Moritsune) - 2002 PS2 game; Hibana - 2003 Nightshade (originally titled Kunoichi in Japan)
Shinobido	Stealth	Shinobido: Way of the Ninja (2005), Shinobido: Tales of the Ninja (2006) and Shinobido 2: Revenge of Zen (2011)
Skylanders	Toys-To-Life	Stealth Elf - first appeared in Skylanders: Spyro's Adventure; Ninjini - first appeared in Skylanders: Giants; Stink Bomb - first appeared in Skylanders: SWAP Force; Lob-Star - first appeared in Skylanders: Trap Team; Tae Kwon Crow - first appeared in Skylanders: Trap Team; Starcast - first appeared in Skylanders: Imaginators; Boom Bloom - first appeared in Skylanders: Imaginators
Sonic the Hedgehog	Platform	Espio the Chameleon - Knuckles' Chaotix, Sonic the Fighters, Sonic Heroes, Shadow the Hedgehog, Sonic Rivals 2, Sonic Generations, Sonic Forces; Sonic Frontiers features mini-bosses Shinobi and Kunoichi
Soul	Fighting	Taki - a wandering demon hunter who appears in Soul Edge as well as all the Soulcalibur titles since 1996; Yoshimitsu - who has originated in the Tekken series; Natsu - Taki's young disciple - Soulcalibur V (2012)
Street Fighter	Fighting	Guy and Maki - from the Final Fight series; Geki; Ibuki; Vega; Zeku
Strider	Action	Hiryu and Hien - the Striders being a futuristic group of hi-tech ninja agents
Suikoden	Role-playing	Kage and Kasumi - Suikoden I and II; Ayame and Watari - Suikoden III
Super Chinese	Various	Little Ninja Brothers (1989), Ninja Boy (1990) and Super Ninja Boy (1991)
Super Smash Bros.	Fighting	Sheik - since Melee (2001); Greninja - since 3DS/WiiU (2014)
Taikou Risshiden	Role-playing	
Tales of...	Role-playing	Sheena Fujibayashi - Tales of Symphonia and Tales of Symphonia: Dawn of the New World; Suzu Fujibayashi - Tales of Phantasia, Tales of Phantasia: Narikiri Dungeon, Tales of the World: Summoner's Lineage; Tales of the World: Radiant Mythology 2
TMNT	Various	Aska - 1993's Teenage Mutant Ninja Turtles: Tournament Fighters; Rabbids (from Rayman Raving Rabbids) - 2009's Teenage Mutant Ninja Turtles Smash-Up
Tekken	Fighting	Yoshimitsu, Kunimitsu, Raven, and Master Raven
Tenchu	Stealth	Sho Kosugi and Kane Kosugi - ninjutsuka references; Rin - Tenchu: Fatal Shadows and Tenchu: Time of the Assassins; Ayame and Rikimaru - 3D Dot Game Heroes
Variable Geo	Fighting	Ninja waitresses Chiho Masuda and Kyoko Kirishima
Vasara	Shoot 'em up	
Virtua Fighter	Fighting	Kage-Maru and his mother Tsukikage (also known as Dural)
WarioWare	Various	Kat and Ana; Ninja Steve (Gold)
Warriors	Crowd fighting	Several ninja characters in the Samurai Warriors and Warriors Orochi series - Ishikawa Goemon, Hanzo Hattori, Kotaro Fuma, Kunoichi, Nene and others since 2004
Way of the Tiger	Various	
Wizardry	Role-playing	Kyo Hattori - Wizardry: Tale of the Forsaken Land
World Heroes	Fighting	Hanzou - Hanzo Hattori; Fuuma (Fuuma Kotarou) - also appeared in Aggressors of Dark Kombat
X-Men	Various	X-Men character Psylocke - X-Men 2: Clone Wars, Marvel Super Heroes, X-Men: Mutant Apocalypse (all three in 1995), X-Men: Children of the Atom (1994), Marvel vs. Capcom 2: New Age of Heroes (2000), X-Men: Mutant Academy 2 (2001), X-Men Legends (2004) and Marvel: Ultimate Alliance 2 (2009), Marvel Super Hero Squad Online (2011) and Marvel: Avengers Alliance (2012), among other games.
YuYu Hakusho	Fighting	Toya
Zool	Platform	Zool, a ninja from the "Nth dimension" in Zool (1992) and Zool 2 (1993); Zooz, Zool's girlfriend in Zool 2

=== Visual novel series ===
Series	Games
Chichi Ninja	Chichi Ninja: Matenrou e Chichi Bomber (2004); Chichi Ninja Revolution: Kanojo-tachi wo Choukyou Seyo (2008)
Choukou Sennin Haruka	Choukou Sennin Haruka (2008); Choukou Sennin Haruka: Haruka VS Escalayer (2009); Choukou Sennin Haruka: Shippuu!? Ninja Dai Sakusen (2009)
Taimanin	Taimanin Asagi (2005); Taimanin Asagi Gaiden: Chaos Arena Hen (2006); Taimanin Asagi 2 (2006); Taimanin Murasaki: Kunoichi Kairai Dorei ni Otsu (2008); Taimanin Yukikaze (2011); Taimanin Asagi 3 (2012); Taimanin Yukikaze 2 (2015); Taimanin Kurenai (2015); Taimanin Asagi ZERO (2018)

== Standalone games ==
=== Games with ninja player characters ===
Series	Genre	Year	Featured ninja characters/Notes
3 Ninjas Kick Back	Beat 'em up	1994	
8bit Ninja		2012	
Action 52		1991	Contains the game Ninja Assault.
Akai Katana	Shooter	2010	
Akakage		1988	An adaption of the anime series Akakage.
Akane the Kunoichi	Platform	2011	
Alex Kidd in Shinobi World	Platform	1990	
Alien Challenge	Fighting	1995	
Amatsukaze: Kugutsu Jinbuu-chou	Other	2008	
Anarchy Reigns	Beat 'em up	2012	An action game featuring the character Cyber Ninja.
Angel Eyes	Fighting	1996	Akane; Kiriko
Angry Ninja		2013	
Ape Escape 3	Platform	2005	Players can turn into the miracle ninja where they use swords, run on walls, walk tight-ropes, and glide through the air (all of which are ninja supposed skills)
ARMS	Fighting	2017	Ninjara
Art of Fighting 3	Fighting	1996	Jin Fu-Ha
Asura Buster: Eternal Warriors	Fighting	2000	Nanami and Rokurouta
Atomic Ninjas		2013	
Avatar	Role-playing	1980	
Avatar Ninja		2010	
Avenging Spirit	Platform	1991	
Ayakashi Ninden Kunoichiban	Other	1997	A ninja-themed dating sim.
Bahamut Lagoon	Tactical role-playing	1996	
Batman Begins	Stealth	2005	As in the film, the game has Batman first joining and then fighting the League of Shadows (at the beginning of the game, as well as at the end).
Bastard!!	Fighting	1994	Gara
Battle Tryst	Fighting	1998	Zankoku
Blood Warrior	Fighting	1994	Arashi and Goemon
Body Blows	Fighting	1993	Ninja
Brandish 3	Action role-playing	1991	
Brawl Brothers	Fighting	1992	Kazan
Breakers	Fighting	1996	Saizo (Tobikage no Saizo)
Bruce Lee	Fighting	2008	Takada
Budo: The Art of Ninja Combat		1993	
Burning Fists: Force Striker	Fighting	Unreleased	Tsukikage
Burning Rival	Fighting	1993	Asuka
Bust-A-Move Bash!	Other	2007	
Cadash	Platform	1989	
Capital Punishment	Fighting	1995	
Captain Commando	Beat 'em up	1991	One member of the Commandos Team is Ginzu (known as Sho in Japan), a ninja trained in the fictional art of Bushinryu ninjitsu. The game also has ninja enemies.
Catfight	Fighting	1996	Chae Lee
Chaos Code	Fighting	2011	Kagari
Charlie Ninja		1994	
Choice of the Ninja		2013	
CoinFalls Shinobi		2011	
Chop Chop Ninja		2009	
Cosmic Carnage	Fighting	1994	Naruto (unrelated to the later manga and anime series)
Clumsy Ninja	All	2013	
Costume Quest	Role-playing	2010	
Criticom	Fighting	1995	
Crossed Swords II		1995	
Cubic Ninja		2011	
Cy Girls	Action-adventure	2004	Featuring the character Aska, who is also a hidden character in the fighting game DreamMix TV World Fighters, as one of the two protagonists, and her brother Kogetsu as a support character.
Cyber Kunoichi Ayame X	Beat 'em up	2015	An adult game.
Cyber Shadow	Platform	2021	
Dark Rift	Fighting	1997	Zenmuron
Dark Seal	Action role-playing	1990	
Dead Rising 2	Action-adventure	2010	
Deadliest Warrior	Fighting	2010	
Deadly Mira		2011	
Denjin Makai 2 / Guardians	Beat 'em up	1995	The character Jinrei
Destrega	Fighting	1998	Kouga (Couger in the English version)
Disgaea 2: Cursed Memories	Tactical role-playing	2006	The siblings Yukimaru and Fubuki
Dot Fighters	Fighting	2006	Takese
Double Dragon	Fighting	1995	Amon
Dragalia Lost	Action role-playing	2018	Aoi, Jurota
Dragon Force	Strategy	1996	
Dragon Knight 4	Role-playing	1994	
Dragoon Might	Fighting	1995	Kodama and Tekkamen
Dual Heroes	Fighting	1997	Retsu
Edo Superstar	Action role-playing	2017	
Ehrgeiz	Fighting	1998	Sasuke
Elite Beat Agents	Other	2005	
Elusive Ninja: The Shadowy Thief		2011	
FaceBreaker	Other	2008	
Fight 'N' Jokes	Fighting	1995	Miopinja
Fighting Layer	Fighting	1998	Sessyu
FIST	Fighting	1996	Tokikaze
Flame of Recca: Final Burning	Fighting	2004	An adaptation of the Flame of Recca ninja-themed manga and anime series.
Flying Dragon (version 1.5)	Fighting	1997	Raima
Funky Punch XL	Fighting	2008	
Fuuka Taisen	Fighting	2008	Akira
FixEight	Shooter	1992	The character "H Ziguragi" (Hayate Ziguragi)
Fruit Ninja	Other	2010	
Gain Ground	Action-strategy	1988	There is a playable ninja character in the Sega Master System version.
Galaxy Fight: Universal Warriors	Fighting	1995	Kazuma
Ganryu	Platform	1999	
Getsu Fūma Den	Action role-playing	1987	
Getter Robo Daikessen!		1999	
Ghost Ninja: Zombie Beatdown	Platform	2013	
Gleam of Force	Fighting	2008	Madoi Takeda
Godai Elemental Force	Beat 'em up	2002	
GoNinja	Platform	2012	
Gotcha Force	Shooter	2003	
Guardian Heroes	Beat 'em up	1996	
Guwange	Shooter	1999	
Hagane: The Final Conflict	Platform	1994	
Heart of China	Adventure	1991	
Heroes of Newerth	Strategy	2011	The character Silhouette
Heroes of the Storm	Strategy	2015	Genji and Hanzo
Homerun Ninja	Other	2012	
Hybrid	Shooter	2012	Unlockable character
I-Escaper!		2009	
I-Ninja	Platform	2003	
Iga Shinobi			
Infinite Undiscovery	Role-playing	2008	
Inindo: Way of the Ninja	Role-playing	1991	A role-playing game about an Iga ninja survivor's quest of revenge against Oda Nobunaga.
Jade Empire	Action role-playing	2005	
Joy Mech Fight	Fighting	1993	
Jump Super Stars	Fighting	2005	Hammer
Kabuki Itouryodan	Fighting	1995	Mikoshi
Kabuki-Z	Beat 'em up	1988	
Kamen no Maid Guy	Fighting	2009	The twins Shizuku and Tsurara
Kamen no Ninja Hanamaru	Platform	1991	
Kamen Rider: Climax Heroes Fourze	Fighting	2011	Gelnewt (known as Red Minion in English). He also appears as a hidden character in the earlier Kamen Rider Climax Heroes W and in Kamen Rider: Dragon Knight
Karate Blazers	Fighting	1991	
Kasumi Ninja	Fighting	1994	Habaki and Senzo, and the boss Gyaku
Kensei: Sacred Fist	Fighting	1998	Hyoma Tsukikage, Kazane Tsukikage (Fuune), and Sessue Kanoh
Knuckle Heads	Fighting	1993	Takeshi Fujioka
Kagerou Densetsu		1990	
Kai Temple		1986	
Karei ni Nousatsu Kunoichi ga Iku! Momoiro Harenchi Ninpouchou	Beat 'em up	2012	An adult game starring Kasumi and Yuuha.
Kid Niki: Radical Ninja	Platform	1986	
Kid Ninja: Spirit of the Dragon		Unreleased	
Knuckle Bash	Beat 'em up	1993	The character Mr. Hayate.
Kung Fu Chaos	Fighting	2003	Ninja Fu Hiya
Kunoichi Bombshell		2012	
Kunoichi Torimonochou	Other	1999	
Kyatto Ninden Teyandee	Platform	1991	
Legend of a Ninja: A Shadow to Remember	Role-playing	2014	
Legend of Kunoichi		2010	
League of Legends	Strategy	2009	Three ninjas of the Kinkou Order: female human ninja Akali, the Fist of Shadow, male human ninja Shen, the Eye of Twilight, male yordle ninja Kennen, the Heart of the Tempest; dark ninja Zed, the Master of Shadows.
Lego Battles: Ninjago	Strategy	2010	
Lego City Undercover	Action-adventure	2013	
The Lego Movie Videogame	Action-adventure	2014	
The Lego Ninjago Movie Video Game	Action-adventure	2017	
LightWeight Ninja		2001	
Lemmings 2: The Tribes	Other	1993	The Shadow tribe of the Lemmings.
Little Wizard	Fighting	2001	Spice Ku
Live A Live	Tactical role-playing	1994	One chapter in the game is based on ninjas during the twilight of Edo Japan
Long Life	Fighting	1994	Sato (main character) and Medik
Luminous Arc	Tactical role-playing	2007	Saki
Mace: The Dark Age	Fighting	1996	Koyasha
Magic Darts	Other	1991	
Magic Sword	Platform/Hack and slash	1990	Contains a selectable ninja ally
Magician Lord	Platform	1990	One of the hero's forms is Shinobi ninja and there are also ninja girl enemies.
Mark of the Ninja	Stealth	2012	
Martial Champion	Fighting	1993	Racheal
Mask of Ninja		2013	
Master Ninja: Shadow Warrior of Death		1988	
Masters of Combat	Fighting	1993	Hayate
Maui Mallard in Cold Shadow	Platform	1995	
Mega Man X6	Platform	2001	The Shadow Armor grants X abilities akin to ninja, including firing shuriken-shaped shots, clinging to walls and ceilings, and changing the charge shot to a multi-hit sword slash.
Midara ni Messatsu! Momoiro Kunoichi Ninpouchou	Platform	2012	An adult game starring Momoka and Hazuki.
Mime-Mime		1995	The character Hen.
Mirai Ninja	Platform	1988	
Moe! Ninja Girls	Visual Novel	2016	A visual novel where the player character is a teenager raised as a ninja in modern times who leaves his isolated village to attend high school in an attempt to have an ordinary life
Mr. Ninja		2011	
Muramasa: The Demon Blade	Action role-playing	2009	
Mystaria: The Realms of Lore	Tactical role-playing	1995	
Mystic Warriors	Shooter	1993	
N	Platform	2005	
Namco × Capcom	Tactical role-playing	2005	A crossover game featuring several ninja characters from Namco and Capcom, including Hiryu and Hien from the Strider series, Taki from the Soul series and Waya Hime from Bravoman as playable characters.
Naruto Kan Hichou: Tsuukai Gyaguabanchuuru		1990	
NeoGeo Battle Coliseum	Fighting	2005	
Nin²-Jump		2011	
NinNin Slash		2011	
Ninja (Ninja Kage)		1984	
Ninja (Ninja/Ninja Mission)	Beat 'em up	1986	
Ninja and Zombies		2013	
Ninja Assault	Shooter	2000	A game about the gun-toting ninjas (Guren and Gunjo, plus Aoi in one version) on a princess-rescue mission in feudal Japan.
Ninja Baseball Bat Man	Beat 'em up	1993	
Ninja Blade	Action-adventure	2009	
Ninja Boy		1990	
Ninja Bros.		2009	
Ninja Captains		2010	
Ninja Cat: Flying!		2013	
Ninja Cats Vs Samurai Dogs		2013	
Ninja Chop!!		2010	
Ninja Combat	Beat 'em up	1990	
Ninja Commando	Shooter	1992	
Ninja Crusaders	Platform	1990	
Ninja Dash		2012	
Ninja Dashing		2013	
Ninja Elite		2013	
Ninja Emaki		1986	
Ninja Exorcist		2012	
Ninja Five-O	Stealth	2003	Side-scrolling game about a ninja cop battling ninja criminals.
Ninja Flu		2006	
Ninja Girl		2011	
Ninja Golf	Other	1990	
Ninja Gun	Shooting gallery	1969	
Ninja Hamster	Fighting	1988	
Ninja Hayate	Action / Interactive movie	1984	
Ninja Kazan		1988	
Ninja Kid	Platform	1986	
Ninja Kid Run		2013	
Ninja Kitty		2013	
Ninja Master's: Haō Ninpō Chō	Fighting	1996	Goemon, Kamui, Kasumi Natsume, Raiga, and Sasuke (the game's main character)
Ninja Pizza Girl		2016	
Ninja Rabbits	Beat 'em up	1991	
Ninja Reflex	Other	2008	
Ninja Revenge		2013	
Ninja Royale		2012	
Ninja Saga		2014	
Ninja School		2013	
Ninja Senki		2010	
Ninja Spirit	Platform	1988	
Ninja Taro	Action-adventure	1991	
Ninja Village		2013	
Ninja Warrior		1983	
Ninja Words Adventure		2010	
Ninja Wrath		2013	
Ninja: Shadow of Darkness	Action-adventure	1998	
Ninjabread Man	Platform	2005	
Ninjala		2020	
Ninjas Live		2013	
Ninjatown	Strategy	2008	
Nnintsuku!		2015	
Nutjitsu		2014	
Nyanko Ninja		2013	
OMG Pirates!		2009	
Oni - The Ninja Master	Beat 'em up	1995	
Oniken	Platform	2012	
Orcs Must Die! 2	Other	2012	
Otoboke Ninja Colosseum	Other	1995	
Overturn	Fighting	2009	Himiko (a ninja robot)
Overwatch	Shooter	2016	Genji and Hanzo
Ouzoku		2007	
Pain	Other	2007	
Peavox Ninja		2013	
Phantom Breaker	Fighting	2011	Yuzuha
Pirates vs. Ninja Dodgeball	Sports/Fighting	2007	
Plain Sight		2010	
Plasma Sword: Nightmare of Bilstein	Fighting	1999	Kaede
Pocket Ninjas		2013	
Pocky & Rocky 2		1994	
Project X Zone	Tactical role-playing	2012	
Quiz & Dragons: Capcom Quiz Game	Other	1992	
Raskulls	Platform	2010	
Ravenloft: Strahd's Possession	Role-playing	1994	The character Irmgarde.
Red Ninja: End of Honor	Stealth	2005	A historical fantasy action/stealth game about a young female ninja Kurenai out for revenge.
Revengers of Vengeance	Fighting	1994	Fuchida
MusicSamurai	Rhythm	2012	Formerly titled Rice&Shine
Rising Zan: The Samurai Gunman	Action-adventure	1999	
Robo Aleste	Shooter	1992	
Rucky Cat Barance Ninja		2015	An Android game in which a ninja named Takeshi must balance a stack of cats on his head.
Rurouni Kenshin: Meiji Kenyaku Romantan	Fighting	1997	Several ninja characters from the Rurouni Kenshin manga and anime series, including Makimachi Misao.
Rush'n Attack: Ex-Patriot	Action-adventure	2011	
Saints Row 2	Other	2008	
Samurai Deeper Kyo	Fighting	2002	Mahiro, Makora, Saizou, and Sasuke Sarutobi
Sanada Ten Braves		1988	
Sasuke vs. Commander		1980	Released in October 1980. An Arcade Archives port for the Nintendo Switch was released in February 2020.
Schmeiser Robo	Fighting	1993	Dotoh-maru (a ninja robot)
Shogun Warriors	Fighting	1992	Ninja (playable) and Goemon (boss)
Secret of the Stars	Role-playing	1993	
Sega Ninja (Ninja Princess and The Ninja)	Shooter	1985	
Sengoku Ninja Tai		1980	
Seven Heroes Story		1995	Shinobu
Shadow Blade	Platform	2014	
Shadow Blasters	Platform	1990	
Shadow Force (Shadow Force: Henshin Ninja)	Beat 'em up	1993	
Shadow Hearts: From the New World	Role-playing	2005	
Shadow Knights	Platform	1991	
Shadow Tactics: Blades of the Shogun	Stealth	2016	
Shien's Revenge	Shooter	1994	
Shining Soul II	Action role-playing	2003	
Shinobitic☆Heart		2003	
Shinrei Jusatsushi Taromaru		1997	
Shotgun Ninja		2008	
Shounen Ninja Sasuke		1994	
Shōnen Sarutobi Sasuke		1994	
Silver Knights		2002	
Skies of Arcadia	Role-playing	2000	
Skullgirls	Fighting	2012	Valentine
Sloppy Ninja		2013	
Small Arms	Shooter	2006	
Snowboard Kids Plus	Other	1999	
Sokko Seitokai: Sonic Council	Fighting	1998	Naoko Hattori
Soul Eater: Battle Resonance	Fighting	2009	Black Star
Soul of the Samurai	Action-adventure	1999	One of the two main characters is a young girl ninja.
Spyborgs	Action-adventure	2009	
Star Ocean: Till the End of Time	Action role-playing	2003	
Stardust Amazoness	Role-playing	2013	
Street Combat (conversion of Ranma ½: Chōnai Gekitōhen))	Fighting	1992	Lita
Super Fighter	Fighting	1993	
Super Ninja		2013	
Superior Soldiers	Fighting	1993	
Survival Arts	Fighting	1993	Hiryu and Tasha
Sword of Honour	Action-adventure	1992	
Sword of Mana	Action role-playing	2003	
Taimanin Asagi Battle Arena	Other	2012	An adult social card game spin-off of the Taimanin Asagi visual novel series.
Tactics Ogre: The Knight of Lodis	Tactical role-playing	2001	
Tatsunoko vs. Capcom	Fighting	2008	
Tenth Degree	Fighting	Unreleased	Miki (A cancelled game, only an arcade prototype exists.)
The Killing Blade	Fighting	1998	
The Messenger	Platform	2018	
The Ninja Kids		1990	
The Ninja Master		1986	
The Peace Plan to Save the World	Other	2004	
The Queen of Duellist	Fighting	1993	Shinobu
Throne of Darkness	Action role-playing	2001	Features four ninja characters for the player to choose from.
Tiny Ninja	Platform	2010	
Toriko: Gourmega Battle!	Fighting	2013	Chirin and Chiru
Total War: Shogun 2	Strategy	2010	The Hattori Iga ninja clan is one of the playable factions in this strategy game. There are also various ninja arts, skills and special units.
Trio the Punch	Beat 'em up	1990	
Tuff E Nuff	Fighting	1993	Kotono and Sirou
Aragami	Stealth	2016	Aragami
Vanguard Princess	Fighting	2009	Kaede Hioh
Vantage Master	Fighting	1997	
Voltage Fighter Gowcaizer	Fighting	1995	Fudomaru
Vs.	Fighting	1997	
War of Ninja		2010	
Warframe	Shooter	2013	
Wrath of the Black Manta (Ninja Cop Saizou)	Platform	1989	
Way of the Samurai 3	Action role-playing	2008	
Way of the Warrior	Fighting	1994	Konotori
Wu-Tang: Shaolin Style	Fighting	1999	Gan Wuyin and Masta Killa (based on the real-life Masta Killa
Yatagarasu: Attack on Cataclysm	Fighting	2015	Azure, Hattori, Hanzo, Uruka, and Kazuma Kotaro.
Yukio-San: A Ninja's Revenge		1986	

=== Visual novels ===
Title	Year
Amatsukaze	2008
Appare! Tenka Gomen	2011
Ayakashi no Maki	2007
Castle Fantasia: Seima Taisen	1998
Cross Channel	2003
Grimoire no Shisho	2013
Haramasete Seiryuu-kun! Jinginaki Onna no Tatakai	2008
Hitozumaman!! Haranda Kunoichi Tsumamigoro	2009
Inchuu Waden Kaikoroku	2012
Kagome no Mayu	2012
Kokou no Kakutou Bishoujo Kirika ga Kimoota ni Tanezuke Saremakuru	2011
Kougeki Shoujo Falselion: Tsundere no Theory	2006
Koi Ninja Sengoku Emaki	2011
Kunoichi Aoi, Aku ni Ochiru	2013
Kunoichi Gibo Shimai Midara Ninpouchou	2010
Kunoichi Kikyou: Gensou Kannou Emaki	2009
Kunoichi Sakuya	2006
Kunoichi San Shimai: Ichi no Maki	2011
Kurenai Senki: Kunoichi Shinobi Ai	2003
Kurumi-chan Ninja	1995
Milkyway	2000
Misao Injyok Nninpouden	2010
Mitama: Shinobi	2002
Nanoha no Ken	
Nukenin: Hokaku	2006
Onikirimaru ~Kochou Ranbu Taimain Den	2011
Princess X FD: Iinazuke wa Owaranai!?	2012
Samurai Hormone	2013
Sengoku no Imouto Shichinin no Imouto	2005
Sengoku Rance	2006
Sexy Magic: Kunoichi Gakuen	2000
Shiden: Enkan no Kizuna	2009
Shinobu Hanafuda and Shinobu Hanafuda 2 Hyakka Soumei - Zenpen	2011
Shinseiki Ijitte Princess Next 2: Kunoichi Hime Kasumi Sanjou!	2008
Shinobi Ryuu	2009
Sousei Taimaden: Nyonin Shimai Ingi Shuutoku no Shiren to Wana	2009
Toriko Kunoichi	2007
Yojouhan Princess	2012

=== Games with ninja character classes ===
Series	Year	Notes
AdventureQuest	2002	
Binary Domain	2012	
Black Desert Online	2014	Kunoichi class was added in 2015.
Bravely Archive: D's Report	2015	
City of Heroes and City of Villains	2004	Both MMORPGs allow the player to create their own hero or villain. In both games, players are able to create ninja characters ("Ninjutsu" and "Stalker" power sets), and customize much of their appearance, and some of their skills. Ninja minions can also be summoned by a ninja master villain player character.
Continent of the Ninth aka C9 Online	2012	
Conquer Online		Male and female class made available in Conquer 2.0.: New Dynasty.
DC Universe Online	2011	
Deathlord	1987	Ninja and shukenja (ninja/magic-user hybrid) classes.
Demise: Rise of the Ku'tan	1999	Ninja, also called "Dark Assassins", is one of the guilds in the game.
Dungeon Fighter Online	2005	Features Ninjutsu skill path of the Thief class. A new job Kunoichi was added in 2015.
Dungeon Lords	2005	One of the character classed in Ninja Lord.
Dungeon Master	1987	One of the four classes in the game (Fighter, Ninja, Priest, Wizard).
Elminage series		
Etrian Mystery Dungeon	2015	
Etrian Odyssey III: The Drowned City	2010	
Final Fantasy		Ninja appeared in the 1987 first installment of the series as an upgrade from the Thief character class, while in Final Fantasy III (1990), Final Fantasy V (1992), Final Fantasy Tactics (1997), Final Fantasy Tactics Advance (2003), Final Fantasy XI (2002), Final Fantasy XII: Revenant Wings (2007), Final Fantasy: The 4 Heroes of Light (2009), and Final Fantasy XIV (2010), among others, the Ninja is available as a job. In the international version of Final Fantasy XII (2006), the ninja class is instead called "Shikari".
Free Realms	2009	
Gotham City Impostors	2012	
Guild Wars	2005	The expansion Guild Wars Factions has a new profession of the ninja-like Assassin.
MapleStory	2003	One of the Level 2 job classes available in this free online RPG is a shuriken-throwing Assassin.
Metin2	2004	
Might & Magic		Ninja character class appears in the series since Might and Magic II: Gates to Another World in 1988.
Nobunaga's Ambition Online	2003	An MMORPG offshoot of the Nobunaga's Ambition strategy series.
NosTale	2007	The Assassin, Ninja and Jajamaru character classes.
Ragnarok Online	2002	A ninja class branch was added to the expansion in addition to Thief and Assassin, primarily for PvP.
Rogue Legacy	2013	Roguelike
RPG Maker 3	2004	
Rune Jade	2000	
Soul Saver Online	2009	
Tactics Ogre: Let Us Cling Together	1995	The Ninja and Kunoichi classes.
Tales of...		Classes/costumes for the player's character in Tales of Phantasia: Narikiri Dungeon (2000), Tales of the World: Narikiri Dungeon 2 (2002), Tales of the World: Narikiri Dungeon 3 (2005), Tales of the World: Radiant Mythology (2006) and Tales of the World: Radiant Mythology 2 (2009).
The Secret World	2012	A female Ninja class.
Ultima Online: Samurai Empire	2004	Ninja is a female character class.
Wizards & Warriors	2000	The Ninja and Assassin classes.
Valhalla Knights	2006	A role-playing game with a Ninja job (improved Thief).
WonderKing Online	2006	One of the 1st class advancements for a Thief job available in this game is a shuriken-throwing ninja.

=== Games with ninja units ===
Series	Year	Notes
Age of Empires III	2006	Powerful mercenaries with the ability to conceal themselves.
Battle Realms	2001	
Command & Conquer: Red Alert 3	2008	A shinobi unit for the Empire of the Rising Sun that can infiltrate buildings like the Allied spy unit.
Command & Conquer 3: Tiberium Wars	2007	Brotherhood of Nod's Shadow Teams are said to be trained with techniques used by ancient ninjas; they are camouflaged and can use hang gliders.
Civilization III: Conquests and Civilization Revolution	2003/2008	Ninja units exclusive for the Japanese civilization.
Disgaea: Hour of Darkness	2003	
Dragon Force	2012	
Empire Earth: The Art of Conquest	2002	Cyber Ninja unit only accessible by the Space-Age Japan faction.
Empire Earth 2	2005	
Gangland	2004	
Guardian War	1993	
Metal Slug Attack	2016	Several ninja characters from different factions: Sho and Yoshino (Ptolemaic Army) and Shizuka (Rebel Army).
Ogre Battle: The March of the Black Queen	1993	
ParaWorld	2006	
Shingen the Ruler	1989	
Shogun: Total War	2000	As spies and assassins.
Swords & Soldiers	2008	
Zombie Tycoon 2	2013	

== Games with ninja non-player characters ==
Bad Dudes Vs. DragonNinja and Hagane no Oni: Kidou Hohei Vs. Onna Ninja Gundan are two Ninja-titled games wherein the players are fighting exclusively against the ninja enemies.

	Series
A	Act of Fighter, Afro Samurai, A.G.II.D.C. RPG Gakuen 2.0 Circus Shijou Saidai no Kiki!? (Shinobi), Akudaikan series, Alex Kidd in High-Tech World, Arkista's Ring,
B	BattleCry, Black Tiger, Blood Brothers, Bloodrayne 2, Borderlands (ninja robots), Brandish series, Bravoman (Waya Hime, later a playable character in Namco x Capcom), Bruce Lee, Bruce Lee: Quest of the Dragon, Brute Force, BS Kaizou Tyoujin Shubibinman Zero,
C	Challenge of the Dragon, Chrono Cross (Grobyc), Chuck Norris Superkicks (a.k.a. Kung Fu Superkicks: Pursuit of The Ninja), Continental, Crash Tag Team Racing, Crime Wave, Crimson Queen (Gabriella Onsokuryuu), Cross Channel,
D	D.C.I&II PSP Da Capo I&II Plus Communication Portable Shinobu Fujibayashi), Demonion: Maou no Chika Yousai (Oboro), Dark Savior, Dark Wizard, Deadpool, Demon Sword, Destroy All Humans! 2, Dinosaurs For Hire, Double Dragon 3: The Rosetta Stone, Double Dragon Neon (Serious Shinobi Shun), Donkey Kong Jungle Beat (Ninja Kong), Dragon Ball games (including Dragon Ball: Advanced Adventure and Dragon Ball Z: Buu's Fury), Dragon Knight II (Ninja and Thief), Dragon's Curse, Dual Blades, Dynamite Cop, D'ark,
E	Eight Man, Enchanted Arms, Evil Woman Executive: Aku no Onna Kanbu and Evil Woman Executive: Full Moon Night (Kaguya),
F	FatalFight, Fightin' Spirit, Full Contact,
G	Galzoo Island (Yamorin), Gex, Gekido, Ghoul Patrol, Gift (Lily, Marie, Ruili), Ginga Yukyou Densetsu RC Tobacker, GunMaster, God Hand (Obese Ninja), Guardians: Agents of Justice (Shadowyn), Gun.Smoke,
H	Hakarena Heart: Ta ga Tame ni Kimi wa Aru? (Mikoto Takayanagi), Half-Life (Black Ops), Heavenly Sword, Hitman 2: Silent Assassin,
I	Ikki, Indiana Jones and the Emperor's Tomb, Itazura Mahjong (Maashin),
J	James Bond 007: Nightfire (Makiko "Kiko" Hayashi and her henchmen), Jumpman, Just Cause 2,
K	Ken-Go, Kenshi, Knights of the Round (The Dark Armor Muramasa), Knights of Xentar, Kodure Ookami, Kōryū no Mimi,
L	Light Crusader, Lightning Warrior Raidy II: ~Temple of Desire~, Lightning Warrier Raidy III, Lords of the Rising Sun,
M	MadWorld, Manhunter 2: San Francisco, Master of Magic, Matt Hazard: Blood Bath and Beyond, Medabots: Metabee Version, Musashi: Samurai Legend, Muzan: Chiniku no Ikenie, My World, My Way,
N	Nana Eiyuu Monogatari, Nightshade (Ninja Misstress' gang), No One Lives Forever 2: A Spy In H.A.R.M.'s Way (Isako's group), Nugashite Okashite Inryoku Kyuushu (Shinobu Yamiyo),
O	Oni, Obscene Guild: Katayoku no Datenshi (Nanao), Osawagase! Kaitou Cure Flone 2 (Amber), Ouka (Hakiku), Ouka Ryouran (Yui Uchida),
P	Painkiller, Plan 9 from Outer Space, Power Blade 2 (Cyber Ninja), Puzzle Quest,
R	Rayman 2: The Great Escape, Rayman Raving Rabbids, Real Time Conflict: Shogun Empires, Red Steel (Komori clan), Red Steel 2, Revolution X, Rhythm Tengoku, Riot Zone, Robo Army, Rocket Power: Beach Bandits, Rune Factory: A Fantasy Harvest Moon (Mei), Ryū ga Gotoku Kenzan!,
S	Sacred 2: Fallen Angel, Samurai Warrior: The Battles of Usagi Yojimbo, Scooby-Doo! Unmasked, Secret of Mana, Sengoku Collection (Fuuma Kotarou), Sengoku Koihime ~Otome Kenran Sengoku Emaki (Hattori Hanzo), Shanghai Dragon, Shikigami (Koma), SHOGUN8 (Kosumo Hoshimaru), Skull & Crossbones, Soldier of Fortune, Sports Champions 2 (Hana), Spyro: Year of the Dragon, Startropics, Stolen (Breeze), Streets of Rage and Streets of Rage 3 (Usanagi, Hanzou, Ryuohin, Ranzou, Yagasira, Setsura, Izayoi, Unsai, Tenzen, Genyosai, Kanzou, Jay, Buoh, Huwa and Mutsu, Shiva, Onihime & Yasha), Sugar Shooter, Super Mario Bros. series (Ninjis), Super Robot Taisen OG Saga: Endless Frontier, Sword of the Samurai,
T	Taiko no Tatsujin: Portable, Take 'Em Out, Time Crisis 3, The Dark Spire, The Legend of Zelda: Ocarina of Time (the Sheikah), The Legend of Zelda: Majora's Mask, The Punisher (Luna, Midori, Mizuki and Misa), The Adventures of Jimmy Neutron Boy Genius: Jet Fusion, The Simpsons, The Tick, Exploding Fist +, ToeJam & Earl III: Mission to Earth, Toki to Towa, Toshin City (Yayoi), Tricky Kick,
W	Wonderland Online (Ding Feng), WarioWare series (Kat and Ana), Way of the Samurai series, Werewolf: The Last Warrior,
Y	YES! HG - Hi-Grade, YES! - Youthful Eager Stories, Yu-Gi-Oh! Duel Monsters GX: WORLD CHAMPIONSHIP 2008, YuYu Hakusho (Kazemaru),
Y	Zettai Maou: Boku no Mune-kyun Gakuen Saga (Sasha Yui).

== Miscellaneous ==
- BMX Ninja and Ninja Scooter Simulator are two extreme sports games.

== See also ==
- List of ninja films
- List of ninja television programs
- Ninjas in popular culture
