= Shadow Dancer =

Shadow Dancer may refer to:

- Shadow Dancer (1989 video game), side-scrolling action game produced by Sega originally released as an arcade game in 1989
- Shadow Dancer: The Secret of Shinobi, side-scrolling action game produced by Sega originally released for the Mega Drive/Genesis in 1990
- Shadow Dancer (2012 film), a British-Irish drama film directed by James Marsh
- Shadow Dancer (1997 film), an American film
