= The Cyber Shinobi =

1991 video game

- European box art
- Developer: Sega
- Publisher: Sega
- Designer: Ryo Kudou
- Composers: Keisuke Tsukahara; Sheriko Dama
- Series: Shinobi
- Platform: Master System
- Release: EU: April 1991; CA: 1991; AU: 1991
- Genres: Platform, hack and slash
- Mode: Single-player

The Cyber Shinobi (also known as Shinobi Part 2) is a 1991 hack and slash video game developed and published by Sega for the Master System. It was the third Shinobi game for the console (including Alex Kidd in Shinobi World) and served as a futuristic sequel to the original Shinobi.

The game was exclusively released in Canada, Europe, Australia, and Brazil, as the Master System had been discontinued in the North American and Japanese markets.

== Gameplay ==
The controls and rules of the game are very different from the original Shinobi. Although the objective of the game is still to reach the end of the stage and then fight a boss, the player cannot proceed onwards at certain points until the enemies are eliminated, similar to a side-scrolling beat-'em-up.

The player attacks primarily with their sword and a crouching kick. The height of the player's jumps can be increased as well by holding the d-pad upwards while pressing the jump button. The player has a total of four gauges on the top screen. In addition to their "life" gauge that shows the amount of damage the player can sustain before losing a life, there is also a "power" gauge that determines the strength of their basic attacks, a "shot" gauge that shows the remaining ammunition of their current sub-weapon, and a "Ninjutsu" gauge that determines which spells the player can use. By destroying item containers located throughout each stage, the player can pick up power-ups marked by the letters "L", "P", "S", and "N" to fill out each gauge by one unit.

When the player first picks up a "Shot" power-up, they will wield a shuriken launcher, which can be replaced with an automatic "Vulcan" gun, and then a supply of grenades, by picking up subsequent "shot" power-ups. Each sub-weapon can only hold up to eight shots, and when the player's current sub-weapon runs out of ammo, they will revert to the previous one, and so on until their last sub-weapon runs out too.

Special "Ninjutsu" attack spells can be performed. There are a total of four Ninjutsu spells, and although each one requires a different number of units to perform, only two units are actually consumed when one is performed. As a result, the player can max out their Ninjutsu gauge, use the powerful spell, and then work their way down to the weaker ones. The Ninjutsu spells available are "Fire" (requires one or two units), "Tornado" (four units), "Lightning" (six units), and "Earth Element" (eight units).

== Plot ==
Set sometime during the 21st century, the player controls the grandson of the ninja master Joe Musashi, also named Joe, who is on a mission to defeat the minions of Cyber-Zeed, a terrorist organization founded by the remnants of the Zeed organization that the original Joe Musashi destroyed. Joe must fight his way through a series of six stages to prevent Cyber-Zeed from launching its stolen stockpiles of plutonium around the world. The stages consist of a construction site, a harbor, a heliport, a jungle, a waterfall, and the enemy's hideout.

== Reception ==
Reception

Review scores
Publication	Score
Mean Machines	58%
Sega Pro	68/100

The game was rated 68 out of a 100 by Sega Pro, which criticized it for its lack of content and easy difficulty. Richard Leadbetter gave the game a score of 46% and compared it unfavorably to the Master System version of the original Shinobi.
