= The Revenge of Shinobi (1989 video game) =

1989 video game

- North American Sega Genesis cover art
- Developer: Sega
- Publisher: Sega
- Director: Noriyoshi Oba
- Producer: Keiichi Yamamoto
- Designers: Taro Shizuoka; Takashi Yuda; Atsushi Seimiya
- Programmer: Matsuhide Mizoguchi
- Composer: Yuzo Koshiro
- Series: Shinobi
- Platform: Sega Genesis
- Release: JP: December 2, 1989; NA: December 1989; PAL: October 1990
- Genres: Hack and slash, platform
- Mode: Single-player

The Revenge of Shinobi, released in Japan as The Super Shinobi, (Note: Japanese: ザ・スーパー忍, Hepburn: Za Sūpā Shinobi) is a hack-and-slash action video game developed and published by Sega in 1989. It was the first Shinobi game developed for the Sega Genesis, and was later released on the coin-operated version of that console, the Mega-Tech.

Alongside Shadow Dancer, the game is a sequel to Shinobi, and features an original score by Yuzo Koshiro. The game was included in the compilations: Mega Games 2, Mega Drive 6 Pak, Sega Classics Arcade Collection (for the Sega CD), and Sega Smash Pack (for the PC and Dreamcast). It was also re-released for the Wii Virtual Console in 2009, on the PlayStation 3 via PlayStation Network and Xbox 360 via Xbox Live Arcade download services in 2012, for iOS and Android devices in 2017 via Sega Forever, and on the Nintendo Classics service in 2023. The game also appears on the Sega Genesis Classics (released as Sega Mega Drive Classics in PAL regions) for Windows, Linux, macOS, PlayStation 4, Xbox One, and Nintendo Switch.

== Plot ==
Taking place three years after the first game, the criminal organization Zeed from the original game has since reformed and has renamed itself "Neo Zeed". They decide to exact their revenge on the Oboro Ninja clan and Joe Musashi by killing his master and kidnapping Joe's bride, Naoko. Joe failed to reach the clan in time, but managed to learn about Neo Zeed's plot from his dying master. Joe decides to travel the world to get his revenge on Neo Zeed and save Naoko before it is too late.

== Gameplay ==
Batman in The Revenge of Shinobi

The game is a traditional side-scrolling platform game. The player controls Joe Musashi across stages set in various locations around the world, encountering enemies, environmental obstacles and boss characters.

The directional pad controls Joe Musashi's movement, while the A, B and C buttons are assigned to ninjutsu, attacking and jumping, respectively, although their functions can be reassigned through the options menu. Pressing the jump button again while airborne performs a somersault, allowing Musashi to reach greater heights and distances. Attacking during a somersault releases eight shuriken simultaneously. Certain stages also feature multiple elevations between which the player can move.

Musashi possesses four ninjutsu techniques: Ikazuchi, which provides temporary protection from enemy attacks; Kariu, which attacks enemies with fire; Fushin, which increases jumping height and distance; and Mijin, which produces an explosion at the cost of one life. The player can use Fushin and one additional technique during each life, while collecting ninjutsu items permits further uses.

The stages contain crates holding additional shuriken, health-restoring items, weapon upgrades, extra lives and ninjutsu power-ups. Some crates instead contain explosives that detonate when touched or after a countdown. The options menu offers four difficulty settings—Easy, Normal, Hard and Hardest—with increasing enemy difficulty and fewer starting lives. Players can also adjust their initial supply of shuriken.

== Development ==
Director Noriyoshi Ohba conceived The Revenge of Shinobi as a game designed specifically for the Mega Drive rather than a direct adaptation of the original arcade game. The development team sought to demonstrate the console's capabilities through multiple layers of parallax scrolling, while introducing gameplay systems better suited to longer home-console sessions. Ohba explained that the introduction of a life bar, rather than the arcade game's one-hit deaths, was intended to allow players to experience more of the game despite making mistakes.

Ohba designed the game's throwing weapons and ninjutsu abilities to provide several levels of assistance to players. Standard shuriken were supplemented by more powerful attacks, followed by defensive and offensive ninja magic, with the self-sacrificing Mijin technique serving as a last resort. He also included an option for unlimited shuriken as an additional means of assistance.

The Mijin technique originated from an earlier, cancelled game designed by Ohba. The abandoned project featured a mechanic that allowed players to sacrifice a life to continue from their current position. Ohba adapted the concept into an offensive ninjutsu ability for The Revenge of Shinobi, incorporating it into the game's difficulty-balancing system.

Some of the enemies are notably too similar to various characters from films and comic books, a fact that Ohba attributes to his own lack of creativity. He made rough sketches of these characters based on what he had in mind at the time, expecting that the character designer would modify them and add their own creative touches for the final game. However, they did not, resulting in some enemy characters who were similar to the likes of Rambo, Batman, Spider-Man, the Terminator and Godzilla. A Master System version was advertised in a 1990 Sega game catalog, but was never released.

The game was previewed in the British Complete Guide to Consoles in 1989 under its Japanese title, Super Shinobi. The publication described it as an enhanced successor to the original arcade Shinobi and anticipated its release for the Mega Drive in Britain during 1990.

== Release ==
The Revenge of Shinobi underwent several software revisions because of similarities between its enemy characters and copyrighted figures from films and comics. Early versions featured opponents resembling Rambo, Batman, Spider-Man and Godzilla. Director Noriyoshi Ohba later explained that the development team had to revise several character designs following copyright concerns. Sega also obtained permission to feature Spider-Man as part of a promotional arrangement, resulting in the character being retained in some later editions.

The early revisions progressively altered the designs of several enemies. Characters resembling Rambo were redesigned, the Batman-like boss was replaced by a winged creature, and the Godzilla-like boss was eventually replaced by a skeletal dinosaur. Some versions also incorporated an explicit Marvel copyright notice acknowledging Spider-Man's appearance.

Further alterations were made for the game's August 2009 Wii Virtual Console release. Spider-Man's appearance was replaced with a pink-coloured character, and the Marvel copyright notice was removed.

=== Sega Smash Pack ===
The PC version of Sega Smash Pack, released in 1999, included an unfinished prototype of The Revenge of Shinobi rather than the final retail version. The prototype featured an accessible level-selection menu and an invincibility option, but lacked portions of the completed game's soundtrack, sound effects, boss encounters and ending sequence.

In 2016, video game preservation project Hidden Palace identified a matching build in Sega's internal ROM archive, with a file timestamp of August 21, 1989. The researchers concluded that the unfinished build had been mistakenly selected for inclusion in the compilation. The archived version differed from the Sega Smash Pack copy primarily in its ROM-header information.

== Reception ==
Reception

Review scores
Publication	Score
Computer and Video Games	93%
Dragon	5/5
Electronic Gaming Monthly	8/10, 8/10, 9/10, 9/10
Famitsu	7/10, 6/10, 8/10, 7/10
Raze	92%
The Games Machine (UK)	88%
Video Games (DE)	91%
Zero	97%
Computer Entertainer	8/8
Mean Machines	94%
Mega	91%
MegaTech	94%
Sega Power	93%
Wizard	C−

Award
Publication	Award
MegaTech	Hyper Game

The Revenge of Shinobi received highly positive reviews from critics. The game received five out of five stars in Dragon. They called it a masterpiece for its animation, graphics, sound and gameplay, but the final boss battle was criticised for being too difficult. Zero magazine said that The Super Shinobi is "brilliant" with graphics, sounds and playability "leaps and bounds ahead of anything on console or computer" while surpassing the playability of the original arcade Shinobi. MegaTech magazine praised the "smart gameplay, graphics and sound". Reviewing the game's appearance in Sega Arcade Classics, Glenn Rubenstein said it "was one of the first Genesis games released, and it shows how far Sega has come since then".

=== Accolades ===
In 1997, Electronic Gaming Monthly ranked Revenge of Shinobi the 83rd best console video game of all time, saying it "packs fantastic level design and even better gameplay". They also praised the novelty of battling obvious clones of Spider-Man, Batman, the Terminator, and Godzilla. In 2004, The Revenge of Shinobi was inducted into GameSpot's list of the greatest games of all time. Mega placed the game at #18 in their Top Mega Drive Games of All Time. In 2017, GamesRadar listed the game 39th on its "Best Sega Genesis/Mega Drive games of all time."

== Sequel ==
A sequel to The Revenge of Shinobi, titled Shinobi III: Return of the Ninja Master, was released in 1993.

== Legacy ==
The game continued to influence later entries in the Shinobi series. During development of Shinobi for the PlayStation 2, producer Masahiro Kumono said that the project began after the idea of reviving The Revenge of Shinobi was proposed, partly in response to requests from overseas fans. Director Toru Shimizu said that the new game's visual concept was rooted in The Revenge of Shinobi's juxtaposition of a traditional ninja with a modern urban setting. The game was again a direct inspiration for Shinobi: Art of Vengeance (2025). Lizardcube creative director Ben Fiquet said that the game was specifically inspired by The Revenge of Shinobi and Shinobi III: Return of the Ninja Master, with powers, moves, enemies, stages and bosses in Art of Vengeance paying homage to the earlier games.

The soundtrack was also significant in composer Yuzo Koshiro's career. Koshiro later described The Revenge of Shinobi as one of the major turning points in his development as a composer and as an origin point for his subsequent dance-music style, having based much of the score on contemporary house music. Director Noriyoshi Ohba was sufficiently impressed by Koshiro's work on the game that he subsequently asked him to compose the music for Streets of Rage.
