= Shinobi Legions =

1995 video game

- North American box art
- Developers: Sega, Tose Software
- Publishers: JP/EU: Sega; NA: Vic Tokai
- Producers: Original Release: Noriyoshi Ohba; Europe: David Nulty
- Composers: Europe: Richard Jacques
- Series: Shinobi
- Platform: Sega Saturn
- Release: JP: June 30, 1995; NA: September 1995; EU: October 1995
- Genres: Platform, hack and slash
- Mode: Single-player

Shinobi Legions, (Note: Known in Japan as New Shinobi Legend (Japanese: 新・忍伝, Hepburn: Shin Shinobi Den)) known in Europe as Shinobi X, is a 1995 hack and slash platform game developed and published by Sega for the Sega Saturn. The player controls the ninja Sho on his quest to prevent his brother Kazuma from finding and using an ultimate ninjitsu technique that could end the world.

The game sees players go through a series of side-scrolling platforming stages, each containing numerous enemies and obstacles that the player must contend with, helpful optional power-ups such as life-ups and temporary abilities that help the player progress and a boss battle, which the player finds at the end of a level and then must defeat. The gameplay is largely retained from prior Shinobi games; however, there is a higher emphasis on the usage of a katana for offense and defense against enemies, and full-motion video cutscenes are used in the game to progress the ongoing plot.

The game has received mixed reviews from critics, with praise for the game's digitized sprite graphics and new defensive moves, but criticism for the FMV cut scenes and lack of any major gameplay changes from previous entries of the series.

== Gameplay ==
Shinobi Legions is a two-dimensional side-scrolling action-platform game in which players control Sho, a ninja who must navigate nine stages containing enemies, environmental hazards and boss encounters. The gameplay retains elements from earlier entries in the Shinobi series, including The Revenge of Shinobi (1989) and Shinobi III: Return of the Ninja Master (1993), while introducing an expanded combat system.

Unlike its predecessors, which placed greater emphasis on ranged attacks, the game focuses primarily on close-quarters combat using a katana, with shurikens serving as a secondary weapon. Sho can perform a variety of sword attacks, including horizontal and vertical strikes, forward thrusts and aerial attacks. The katana can also be used defensively to block or deflect enemy projectiles. Additional manoeuvres include rolling, sprinting and double-jumping, allowing players to combine movement with offensive attacks.

Various items and power-ups can be collected throughout the stages, including those that restore health, provide additional lives or grant special abilities. The ninjutsu system has also been modified from previous instalments, with special techniques obtained through collectible items rather than a selection of different spells. The game incorporates digitised footage of live actors into its character sprites, while full-motion video cutscenes appear between stages to advance the storyline.

== Plot ==
Years of civil war have brought the ninjutsu code and its warriors to the brink of extinction. A ninjutsu master selects three children to carry on the ninja traditions for the next generation: two brothers, Kazuma and Sho, and his own daughter Aya. He begins to train them.

Fifteen years pass. The oldest boy, Kazuma, begins to reject all the ninjutsu teachings, save for the technique of strength. Obsessed with power, Kazuma demands that the master teach him the ultimate technique. The master refuses, and Kazuma vows to return one day and take revenge. Sho and Aya continue their studies and master the ninjutsu teachings.

Kazuma returns with an army and the resources to build a fortress. Although the old master has died, his pupils contain the secrets of the ultimate technique. Kazuma sets up a trap to lure Sho into his hideout and kidnaps Aya to use her as bait.

In the ending, Kazuma sacrifices himself to save Aya and Sho from an explosion.

== Development and Release ==
European box art for Shinobi X, a renamed release of Shinobi Legions

Shinobi Legions was first announced in June 1994 during the Tokyo Toy Show.

The game received extensive pre-release coverage, appearing under the European title Shinobi X in British publications as early as September 1994. Its release was repeatedly postponed. Edge reported in July 1995 that the game had originally been scheduled for December 1994, while an April 1995 issue of Computer and Video Games stated that Sega was then targeting a June release.

The game's visual presentation marked a departure from previous entries in the series, incorporating digitised footage of live actors into its two-dimensional gameplay. Japanese magazine Saturn Fan compared the game's visual style with that of The Revenge of Shinobi and Shinobi III: Return of the Ninja Master, highlighting the use of digitised characters and cinematic sequences. British magazine Mean Machines Sega similarly highlighted the filmed actors used for the game's character sprites, while noting that it retained the side-scrolling gameplay and ninja abilities of its predecessors.

The European release of Shinobi Legions was published by Sega Europe and renamed as Shinobi X. Shinobi X was delayed release due to Sega Europe's producer, David Nulty, reportedly disliking the original music score and wanting it changed for the European release, in a similar way Sega of America did years before with the North American release of Sonic CD. The in-game tracks were replaced with music from British video game composer Richard Jacques; however, the cutscene music tracks were left intact. Jacques composed the soundtrack in imitation of the style of Yuzo Koshiro's soundtrack from The Revenge of Shinobi (1989).

The North American release was published by Vic Tokai rather than Sega.

The game's in-game credits identify the cast and production staff responsible for the live-action cutscenes but omit the personnel responsible for developing the game itself.

== Reception ==
Reception

Review scores
Publication	Score
Electronic Gaming Monthly	8.5/10, 7.5/10, 8/10, 8/10
EP Daily	8.5/10
Famitsu	8/10, 7/10, 6/10, 5/10
Next Generation	3/5
Maximum	2/5
Sega Saturn Magazine	3/5

On release, GamePro gave it a rave review, stating that "If you've been sitting on the fence regarding a Sega Saturn purchase, here's a swift shuriken in the butt to get you moving." They particularly praised the new defensive moves and greater variety of enemies compared to previous Shinobi games. They also felt that the digitized sprite-based graphics were a refreshing change from the polygon-based graphics used in most Saturn games. The four reviewers of Electronic Gaming Monthly likewise praised the new defensive moves and "fluid" graphics. They had varying reactions to the FMV cutscenes, and two of the reviewers felt the game lacked the "feel" of earlier Shinobi games, but all four agreed that the game was both visually impressive and fun to play. A critic for Next Generation, while remarking that the game made no real advance in gameplay over its last generation predecessors, argued that it also maintains the standard of excellent gameplay set by those predecessors, and that the greater sophistication in the graphics would likely be enough to appease fans of the Shinobi series. Sega Saturn Magazine said that it plays well but fails to make any real use of the Saturn's capabilities, calling it "another Shinobi game that somehow managed to find its way on to CD instead of cartridge." They suggested that the "tacky" FMV scenes were added simply as an excuse to release the game on the Saturn instead of the Sega Genesis. A reviewer for Maximum described it as "a disappointment" compared to the earlier Shinobi games, but did not provide any specifics.

== Legacy ==
The European release, Shinobi X, was among the early Sega projects scored by British composer Richard Jacques, who created a replacement soundtrack for the game. Jacques subsequently became a prominent composer for Sega Europe, contributing music to titles including Sonic R, Sega Worldwide Soccer '98, Metropolis Street Racer and Headhunter.

Retrospectively, the game has been noted as an unusual transitional entry in the Shinobi series, retaining the two-dimensional gameplay style of Shinobi III: Return of the Ninja Master while adopting digitized actors and full-motion video. Retro Gamer described its visual overhaul as divisive, while noting that its gameplay remained largely faithful to the Mega Drive entries.
