= Hagane: The Final Conflict =

1994 video game

- North American box art
- Developers: CAProduction; Red Entertainment
- Publisher: Hudson Soft
- Director: Kappa Yuzawa
- Designer: Osamu Tsujikawa
- Programmer: Izumi Fukuda
- Artist: Keita Amemiya
- Composer: Takahito Abe
- Platform: Super NES
- Release: JP: November 18, 1994; EU: May 1995; NA: June 1995
- Genres: Action, platform
- Mode: Single-player

Hagane: The Final Conflict (Note: Hagane: The Final Conflict is known in Japan as simply 鋼 HAGANE (鋼; lit. "Steel")) is a 1994 action-platform video game developed by CAProduction and Red Entertainment and published by Hudson Soft for the Super Nintendo Entertainment System. The player takes on the role of a ninja cyborg named Hagane on his path to take revenge on an opposing ninja faction. The game combines traditional Japanese ninja and samurai aesthetics with a futuristic setting. The player has a wide variety of weapons, moves, and attacks at their disposal to defeat enemies and progress through the game. Hagane released to positive reception, and was compared favorably to classic side-scrolling action games. Reviewers praised the controls, art design, and challenge but criticized the quality of the graphics and sound.

== Gameplay ==
Hagane attacking enemies in the first stage

Hagane features side-scrolling action and platforming gameplay and blends elements of traditional Japanese ninja and samurai with a futuristic setting. The player controls Hagane, a ninja cyborg, and can switch between four different weapons: a sword, chain, shuriken, and grenades. Additionally, there are also limited magic attacks available which clear the screen of enemies. Hagane can execute a wide variety of moves including somersaults, flying jump kicks, wall-jumping, sliding, and charge attacks. After three hits the player will die, although the game provides health power-ups that will increase the player's health meter beyond three hits. After dying, these health bonuses are lost. All the stages feature platforming with the exception of one stage in which the player rides on a hovercraft through a Mode 7 sequence. The stages are notably short with very few checkpoints across the game. Running out of lives will place the player at the start of the chapter should they choose to continue. There is no save feature, and the player can only continue up to seven times in the Japanese version before their game is over.

== Plot ==
The Fuma and Koma ninja clans who live mainly in darkness have mastered the secret arts of ninjutsu and black magic. Although they look like normal humans, they have strength and spiritual power beyond normal. Each clan consists of several factions. The Fuma clan is split into factions based on the Chinese zodiac. The Koma clan is split into factions by color; consisting of the white, the gold and the red dragon. In the case of the Fuma clan, members of a given faction know nothing more about any other factions except that they exist and their bloodlines are cut off from the outside world and are destined to decline. The Fuma clan possesses extreme strength and spiritual power. Their duty is to protect the Holy Grail, which is said to possess power that can destroy the world. From long ago, the evil Koma clan had plotted to destroy the world using the destructive power of the Holy Grail.

The Koma clan eventually attacked a faction of the Fuma clan and stole the Holy Grail. However, they failed to notice that among the severely wounded, one man survived. On the verge of death, the barely living man known as Hagane was brought back to life by advanced cyber-technology performed by a mysterious old man named Momochi. However, none of Hagane's body survived except his brain. Already a powerful ninja, he now had the incredible power and speed of a cyborg. With this power, he vowed to take revenge on the Koma clan. At the end of the conflict and having destroyed the Koma clan's complex, Hagane overlooks the scene from a cliff outcropping, satisfied. His purpose fulfilled, Hagane's glowing eyes fade to black and he passes on. As the credits roll, time and nature claim his seated form and rust his katana as a nearby tree grows unhindered by the blackened land.

== Release ==
Hagane was developed by CAProduction and published by Hudson Soft. It was released in Japan on November 18, 1994, and later brought to North America in June 1995, and Europe in May 1995.

== Reception ==
Reception

Review scores
Publication	Score
Computer and Video Games	91/100
Famitsu	27/40
Game Informer	7.5/10
Game Players	78%
GameFan	88/100, 83/100, 86/100
GamesMaster	81%
Next Generation	3/5
Official Nintendo Magazine	90/100
Super Play	74%
Total!	(UK) 86/100 (DE) 3+
Electronic Games	B+
Games World	73%
Super Gamer	89/100
VideoGame Advisor	C+
VideoGames	7/10

Nintendo Power praised Hagane's challenging gameplay, non-stop action. and controls, comparing it to the Ninja Gaiden series. However, they criticized the game's lack of variation and sub-par graphics which they compared to a "good NES game". (Note: Nintendo Power provided four individual reviews of 3.3, 3.1, 3.1, and 3.0.) GamePro's Lawrence Neves also complimented the play control, as well as the Hagane's variety of special moves, but criticized the music as "techno Japanese rock at its most mundane". Neves found the graphics to be impressive but losing their appeal due to the repetitive enemies and environments. He found Hagane to be comparable with classic side-scrolling action games, but stopped short of calling it a classic itself due to the waning 16-bit market. Neves recommended the game to those looking for a nostalgic action gaming experience, but worthwhile only as a rental. A reviewer for Next Generation complemented the game's dark and detailed graphics, the suitable enemy abundance and variety, and the player character's wide set of attacks. However he criticized the game's lack of originality, particularly what he saw as a striking resemblance to the Sega Genesis installments of the Shinobi series.

In a retrospective review, Kurt Kalata of Hardcore Gaming 101 called Hagane a "cult classic" and "sleeper hit" despite some lost potential. He found the gameplay to be heavily influenced by Shinobi III and overall challenging, although there were some frustrating platforming sequences. Additionally, he liked the wide variety of gameplay mechanics available but criticized the game design for not utilizing them. The set pieces and enemy sprites were praised for their detail, but the environments were found to be too dark and boring in tandem with the forgettable music. Kalata believed many of Hagane's design flaws, such as enemy placement and level design, would have been alleviated in the hands of a more skilled developer. In 1995, Total! ranked the game 45th on their Top 100 SNES Games writing: "The graphics are moody and the gameplay is not only fast but furious also. It's classically demanding shooting action."
