= Shadow Dancer: The Secret of Shinobi =

1990 video game

- Japanese cover art
- Developer: Sega
- Publisher: Sega
- Designer: Tomohiro Kondo
- Artists: Hiroyuki Kawaguchi; Rieko Kodama
- Composer: Keisuke Tsukahara
- Series: Shinobi
- Platform: Sega Genesis
- Release: JP: 1 December 1990; NA: 1990; EU: 1991
- Genres: Platform game, hack and slash
- Mode: Single-player

Shadow Dancer: The Secret of Shinobi (シャドー・ダンサー ザ・シークレット・オブ・シノビ), also known simply as Shadow Dancer, is a side-scrolling action game developed and published by Sega for the Sega Genesis in 1990. It is the second game in the Shinobi series released for the Mega Drive, following The Revenge of Shinobi. However, it is not a continuation of the previous game, but rather a loose adaptation of the 1989 arcade game Shadow Dancer. Like in the original arcade game, the player controls a ninja followed by a canine companion. The Secret of Shinobi was well received by critics.

== Gameplay ==
Gameplay screenshot

The play mechanics are similar to the arcade version of Shadow Dancer, with the main difference being the addition of a meter for the dog that accompanies the protagonist. In order for the dog to attack an enemy, the player must hold down the attack button until the meter is filled. The dog will only attack when he is barking towards a nearby enemy. This allows the player to sic the dog on an enemy while standing and jumping, allowing for more versatility than in the arcade game (where the dog only attacked while the player was crouching). The objective of each stage is also slightly changed from retrieving time bombs to rescuing hostages, much like in the original Shinobi. The male hostages give out bonus points and the occasional extra life, while the female hostages will enhance the protagonist's attacks until he reaches the next stage or loses a life.

While the one-hit-point-per-life system from the arcade version has been retained, there are numerous bonus lives hidden throughout the game. Between rounds, the player will participate in a bonus stage where the protagonist jumps down from a building and must shoot down an army of 50 enemy ninjas jumping in his direction. After the bonus stage ends, the player will gain a certain number of points or extra lives. If no enemies are hit, the player gains one life. Hitting all enemies rewards the player with three additional lives.

There are three difficulty settings in the game, each affecting the enemy placement and the number of continues the player gets. The player can also choose to disable shurikens, using them only for boss battles and bonus stages. Bonus points are awarded at the end of each stage and boss battle (except for the final stage), based on how long it took the player to complete the stage and whether a ninjutsu attack was used or not. There are also hidden bonuses that the player can achieve by completing a stage or boss battle under a certain condition.

There are five stages in all. The first four stages consist of three areas each, with the third area being a confrontation with an end boss. The fifth and final stage consists of a series of five rooms filled with various enemies, ultimately leading to Sauros' throne, the game's final boss.

== Plot ==
In 1997, an evil ninja cult, Union Lizard, worshipping a giant reptilian demon, had taken over New York City, turning most of the city to ruins. The few citizens who survived Union Lizard's onslaught of chaos are now kept prisoners by its members. A ninja warrior, accompanied by his faithful dog Yamato (大和), emerges from hiding to combat Union Lizard's reign and rescue the hostages. The identity of the protagonist, which is kept ambiguous in the in-game opening, varies between supplemental materials. The Japanese manual identifies him as Hayate (疾風), son of Joe Musashi from the previous games in the Shinobi series, while the English language manual identifies him as Joe Musashi himself coming out of retirement.

== Release ==
Shadow Dancer was released by Sega for the Sega Genesis in 1990 in Japan and North America, and in Europe in 1991. It was re-released via emulation services such as the Wii's Virtual Console and Microsoft Windows in 2010, and was also included in the North American version of Sega Genesis Collection for the PlayStation 2 and PlayStation Portable, and a further re-release came with Sega Genesis Classics (released as Sega Mega Drive Classics in PAL regions) eight years later for Windows, Linux, macOS, PlayStation 4, Xbox One and Nintendo Switch.

== Reception ==
Reception

Review scores
Publication	Score
Computer and Video Games	63%
Electronic Gaming Monthly	32 / 40
GamePro	4 / 5
Nintendo Life	8/10
ACE	778 / 1000
Hobby Consolas	90%
Joystick	90%
Player One	90%
Sega Power	90%
Video Games & Computer Entertainment	33 / 40

Shadow Dancer: The Secret of Shinobi was very well received. Video Games & Computer Entertainment awarded this "brilliant and beautiful arcade monster" an overall score of 33 out of 40. ACE gave it a score of 778/1000 and Hobby Consolas gave it a 90%.

The game was reviewed in 1991 in Dragon #172 by Hartley, Patricia, and Kirk Lesser in "The Role of Computers" column. The reviewers gave the game 5 out of 5 stars and said that "Shadow Dancer offers incredible, flicker-free animation. The music and sound effects are good, though not up to Revenge of Shinobi's standards. The details are outstanding (enemies actually duck behind boxes to reload their weapons after firing at Mushashi), and the backgrounds are stunning. This is another game that shows off the high quality of the Genesis machine, and we highly recommend it."

In 2008, Joystiq called The Secret of Shinobi "the most awesome release" in the entire Shinobi franchise, adding that the game "answers the question of what could possibly be cooler than a ninja stalking around a gritty urban landscape: that ninja's dog". According to a Virtual Console review by Nintendo Life in 2010, "this title comes highly recommended to all ninja fans".

Retro Gamer declared "this magnificent console offering" to be superior to the original Shadow Dancer due to "far better bosses and a greatly improved difficulty level", as well as "far more responsive" control system. In contrast, Computer and Video Games considered it inferior to the original Shadow Dancer arcade game and Revenge of Shinobi.

In 1992, Mega placed it at #33 in their ranking of top Mega Drive games of all time.
