= Shinobi (1987 video game) =

Hack and slash video game

- European arcade flyer
- Developer: Sega R&D 1
- Publisher: Sega
- Director: Yutaka Sugano
- Composer: Yasuhiro Kawakami
- Series: Shinobi
- Platform: Arcade: Master System, Commodore 64, Amiga, Amstrad CPC, Atari ST, ZX Spectrum, IBM PC, PC Engine, NES, MSX
- Release: November 16, 1987: Arcade; JP: November 16, 1987; EU: Late 1987; NA: February 1988 Master System; JP: June 19, 1988; NA: September 1988; EU: November 1988 C64; NA: July 1989; EU: September 1989 Amiga; EU: September 1989; NA: December 1989 Atari ST, CPC; EU: September 1989 ZX Spectrum; EU: September 18, 1989 MS-DOS; NA: October 1989 PC Engine; JP: December 8, 1989 NES; NA: December 1989 MSX; EU: 1989
- Genres: Hack and slash, platform
- Modes: Single-player, multiplayer
- Arcade system: Sega System 16

Shinobi (忍) is a 1987 hack and slash video game developed and published by Sega for arcades on the Sega System 16 board. The player controls ninja Joe Musashi, who must stop the Zeed terrorist organization from kidnapping students of his clan.

Shinobi was a commercial success in arcades. It topped the monthly Japanese table arcade charts in December 1987, and became a blockbuster hit in the United States, where it was the highest-grossing conversion kit of 1988 and one of the top five conversion kits of 1989. It was adapted by Sega to its Master System game console, followed by conversions to the Nintendo Entertainment System, PC Engine, and home computers. It was re-released as downloadable emulated versions of the original arcade game for the Wii and Xbox 360. The arcade game was released for the Nintendo Switch in January 2020 through the Sega Ages series. Shinobi's success inspired various sequels and spin-offs of the Shinobi series.

== Gameplay ==
In Stage 2–1, Musashi confronts an enemy keeping a kidnapped child hostage.

The controls of Shinobi consist of an eight-way joystick and three action buttons for attacking, jumping, and using ninjutsu techniques called "ninja magic". The player can walk forward or perform a crouching walk by pressing the joystick diagonally downward. The player can jump to higher or lower floors by pressing the jump button while holding the joystick up or down. The protagonist Joe Musashi's standard weapons are an unlimited supply of shurikens, and punches and kicks. Rescuing certain hostages in each stage will grant him an attack upgrade, replacing throwing stars with a gun, and his close-range attack becomes a katana slash. Musashi's ninjutsu techniques can only be used once per stage and will clear the screen of all enemies or cause significant damage to a boss. Depending on the stage, the three ninjutsu techniques are a thunderstorm, a tornado, and a doppelganger attack.

Enemies include punks, mercenaries, ninjas, and the Mongolian swordsmen guarding each hostage. Musashi can bump into most enemies without harm and can only be killed if he is struck by an attack, gets hit by a projectile, or falls into a bottomless hole. The stage will then restart, but any saved hostages will be retained. When the player runs out of lives, additional coins will continue the game, except for the final mission. The time limit is three minutes per stage, and bonus points are awarded for time, with additional bonuses for refraining from ninjutsu technique (except on the fifth level) or using only melee attacks. Extra lives are awarded for achieving certain scores, completing the bonus round, or rescuing a special hostage.

A bonus round has a first-person perspective of throwing shurikens at incoming enemy ninjas, for an extra life.

== Plot ==
A ninja named Joe Musashi must stop a criminal organization called Zeed from kidnapping the children of his ninja clan. Five missions consist of three stages in the first mission and four stages each in the rest. Musashi approaches Zeed's headquarters and frees all the hostages in the first two or three stages, with a boss at the final stage of each mission. At the start of each mission, the player is shown the objective, with a file containing a photograph of the enemy boss and a map display pinpointing the location of the next stage.

== Ports ==
=== Master System ===
Sega converted Shinobi to its Master System game console. It was released in Japan on June 19, 1988, followed by North America in September 1988 and Europe in November 1988. Some of the play mechanics were altered. Instead of one-hit kills, the player now has a health gauge. Hostage rescue is now an optional task, but it provides upgrades to the close and long-range weapons, and restores or expands the health gauge. Rescuing certain hostages is a requirement to access the bonus stages, which now occur after the regular stages instead of each boss fight. Bonus rounds provide the ninjutsu skills.

In October 1992, Atari Corporation filed a lawsuit against Sega for an alleged infringement of a patent created by Atari Corp. in the 1980s, and Atari sought a preliminary injunction to stop manufacturing, usage, and sales of hardware and software for the Genesis and Game Gear. On September 28, 1994, both parties reached a settlement involving a cross-licensing agreement to publish up to five games each year across their systems until 2001. The Master System version is one of the first five games approved from the deal by Sega to be converted for the Atari Jaguar, but it was never released for unknown reasons.

=== Home computers ===
In 1989, conversions of Shinobi were released for the Amiga, Atari ST, Commodore 64, Amstrad CPC, and ZX Spectrum. All five were developed by The Sales Curve and published by Virgin Mastertronic in Europe and by Sega in North America, except the Amstrad and Spectrum versions. An IBM PC version was developed by Micromosaics Inc. and released in North America by Sega.

=== PC Engine ===
A PC Engine version was released exclusively in Japan by Asmik on December 8, 1989. The graphics and play mechanics of the PC Engine version are similar to the arcade version's, but the close-range attacks and power-ups are missing, and there are extra lives for points instead of bonus rounds. There is no life gauge, time limit, or Mission 2.

=== Nintendo Entertainment System ===
The Nintendo Entertainment System version of Shinobi was released by Tengen exclusively in North America as an unlicensed release in 1989. The play mechanics are based on the Master System version, but without close-range weapons and grenades. All the vertical-scrolling stages (such as Mission 2-2 and Mission 3-2) were redesigned into horizontal-scrolling stages.

=== Wii and Xbox 360 ===
The arcade version was published on the Wii's Virtual Console and Xbox 360's Live Arcade services, with slight graphical modifications due to licensing issues over one character's resemblance to Spider-Man.

=== Sonic's Ultimate Genesis Collection ===
Shinobi is unlockable in Sonic's Ultimate Genesis Collection for the PlayStation 3 and Xbox 360 after the first round of Shinobi III: Return of the Ninja Master without using a continue.

== Reception ==
Reception

Review scores
Publication	Score		
Publication	Arcade	Master System	NES
Computer and Video Games	Positive	8/10; 87%	
Dragon		4/5	
Electronic Gaming Monthly			5/10, 5/10, 4/10, 4/10
Mean Machines Sega		87%	
Sinclair User	8/10		
Commodore User	8/10		
Computer Entertainer		8/8	
Sega Power		5/5	
Sega Pro		89%	

Award
Publication	Award
Computer and Video Games	C+VG Hit

In Japan, Game Machine listed Shinobi as the most successful table arcade unit of December 1987. It was a blockbuster hit in the United States, where it became the highest-grossing arcade conversion kit of 1988, and one of the top five highest-grossing conversion kits of 1989.

The arcade game received critical acclaim. Clare Edgeley of Computer and Video Games noted it as one of several popular "martial arts simulation" games at London's Amusement Trades Exhibition International (ATEI) show in January 1988, along with Taito's Ninja Warriors and Data East's Vigilante. She said it plays similarly to Ninja Warriors, but that it also has elements from Namco's run and gun game Rolling Thunder (1986), introduces bonus stages, and is more challenging overall. She praised the "clean colourful graphics" with large "well defined" sprites, and the action gameplay for being fast-paced and challenging, concluding that the game is "well worth playing". Nick Kelly of Commodore User rated it 8 out of 10, also noting similarities to Rolling Thunder, but said Shinobi looks good, "plays brilliantly", and "combines several kinds of shoot'em and beat'em up action in one well-thought-out, well-executed game." Sinclair User also compared it to Rolling Thunder and other martial arts games, but considers Shinobi "sufficiently different to be familiar without being boring." Retrospectively, Black Belt magazine in 2003 called Shinobi "one of the best martial arts arcade games of the 1980s".

Sega's conversion for the Master System received critical acclaim. Computer and Video Games praised the "well defined" graphics, good sound, and "excellent" gameplay. Computer Entertainer scored it a full 8 out of 8 stars, calling it "the best game with a martial arts theme that we've seen on a video game system." It was awarded 4 out of 5 stars in Dragon. Classic Game Room's retrospective review reflected that the game is a classic, though less so than the 16-bit sequel The Revenge of Shinobi.

Zach Gass of Screen Rant included Shinobi and its sequels in his list of ten "awesome" hack-and-slash games in 2020.

== Legacy ==
According to Den of Geek, "Shinobi is arguably the most ‘important’ and influential ninja game, as well as kicking off the genre’s longest running franchise."

=== Sequels and related games ===
In 1989, Sega released a sequel called The Revenge of Shinobi (The Super Shinobi in Japan) as one of the first games for its new Mega Drive game console. An arcade sequel called Shadow Dancer was also released in 1989. Shadow Dancer retains the original gameplay, adding a canine companion.

Other sequels were released for the Game Gear, Mega Drive/Genesis, Sega Saturn, the PlayStation 2, and the Nintendo 3DS. Alex Kidd in Shinobi World is a parody of Shinobi starring former Sega mascot Alex Kidd, released for the Master System in 1990.
