= Otoboke Ninja Colosseum =

1995 video game

- Cover art of Otoboke Ninja Colosseum
- Developer: Mint
- Publisher: Intec
- Composers: Tsukushi Sasaki; Akihiko Mori
- Platform: Super Famicom
- Release: JP: February 25, 1995
- Genres: Action, Puzzle
- Modes: Single-player, multiplayer

Otoboke Ninja Colosseum (おとぼけ忍者コロシアム; "Zany Ninja Coliseum") is a Japan-exclusive action strategic, maze-based video game, developed by Mint and published by Intec, which was released in 1995.

People who have played Bomberman will find the game structure to be similar.

== Reception ==
On release, Famicom Tsūshin scored the game a 21 out of 40.

== See also ==
- List of ninja video games
