= Shinobi: Art of Vengeance =

2025 video game

- Developer: Lizardcube
- Publisher: Sega
- Director: Ben Fiquet
- Producer: Sacha Szymoniak
- Designer: Frédéric Vincent
- Programmer: Vincent Lesueur
- Artist: Ben Fiquet
- Composer: Tee Lopes
- Series: Shinobi
- Engine: Unity
- Platforms: Nintendo Switch; PlayStation 4; PlayStation 5; Windows; Xbox One; Xbox Series X/S; Nintendo Switch 2
- Release: Switch, PS4, PS5, WIN, XBO, XBX/S; August 29, 2025; Switch 2; September 24, 2026
- Genre: Platformer
- Mode: Single-player

Shinobi: Art of Vengeance (Note: Japanese: SHINOBI 復讐の斬撃, Hepburn: Shinobi: Fukushū no Zangeki) is a 2025 action platform game developed by Lizardcube and published by Sega. It is a revival of Sega's Shinobi series, and the first new entry since its 2011 reboot for the Nintendo 3DS. It was released for Nintendo Switch, PlayStation 4, PlayStation 5, Windows, Xbox One and Xbox Series X/S. A Nintendo Switch 2 version was released on September 24, 2026.

== Gameplay ==
Shinbo: Art of Vengence introduces a combo system.

Shinobi: Art of Vengeance is a 2D action platformer. The player controls ninja Joe Musashi through various levels where the goal is to defeat the bosses at the end of them. Musashi is equipped with a sword and kunai but can also use magical powers called "Ninpo" to defeat his enemies. Enemies can be staggered and tagged, allowing Musashi to unleash "Shinobi Execution", killing all tagged enemies at once. Amulets can also be equipped, granting the player character additional combat bonuses. As a ninja, Musashi is very agile, being capable of performing feats such as double jumping, dashing through air, and dodge-rolling. As players progress, they will be able to spend gold, the in-game currency, to unlock new trasversal tools, combat moves and upgrades. Unlike prior entries, however, the game is based more around Metroidvania styled exploration to find secrets and side content. After each stage is completed, they can be replayed in Arcade mode, which challenges players to complete the stage as fast as possible.

An additional set of five stages were released as downloadable content on April 3, 2026. The stages feature boss battles with three villains from other Sega franchises: Death Adder from Golden Axe, Goro Majima from Yakuza, and Doctor Eggman from Sonic the Hedgehog. The DLC also adds new outfits and Ninpo based on each franchise.

== Plot ==
The world is under siege by ENE Corporation, a powerful paramilitary organization led by a man named Lord Ruse. The only force left that can oppose them is the Oboro clan, a clan of mystical shinobi that has been protecting mankind for centuries, currently led by Joe Musashi. ENE attacks Oboro Village, killing most of the clan. Musashi confronts Ruse and his lieutenants, and while he drives them back, his wife Naoko and student Tomoe are the only survivors, prompting Musashi to embark on a quest for revenge.

Musashi enlists Tomoe to gather intelligence about ENE Corp activities in the region. While Musashi investigates, Ruse exploits his absence and attacks Musashi's home, killing both Tomoe and Musashi's dog Yamato. As Musashi mourns their deaths, he is met by an Ankou, a mortal man who was chosen to be the Grim Reaper to maintain the cycle of life and death. He explains that a new Ankou is selected each year, with Ruse having been chosen to be the next Ankou. Ruse refused, not wanting to leave behind his loved ones, and stole the Ankou's Death Scythe, using it to empower himself with the souls he reaps. The Ankou warns that if this continues, the balance of life and death will be toppled and destroy the world. Musashi agrees to help the Ankou retrieve the Death Scythe from Ruse and restore balance.

While tracking Ruse, Musashi encounters Chiyo, a kunoichi and the head of ENE's combat division. Defeating her, he realizes that she was brainwashed and removes her mind-control device. Now lucid, Chiyo explains she was the leader of an anti-ENE resistance, but her forces fell to Ruse and she was brainwashed into serving as his lieutenant. Seeking revenge, she joins Musashi and the Ankou, directing them to major ENE bases of operations to weaken them and buy time for her to rebuild the resistance. As they dismantle his operations, Ruse sends the mountain-sized kaiju Tenval to attack the resistance, but Musashi lets the creature swallow him and destroys it from the inside.

With the resistance rebuilt, Musashi, Chiyo, and the Ankou lead the rebel army in a siege on Ruse's castle. Ruse's lieutenant Kijima is defeated, and a portal opens to Limbo, where Ruse currently resides. Musashi and the Ankou enter the portal and encounter the spirits of Tomoe and Yamato, alongside the rest of the Oboro Clan, who join in a final attack against Ruse's forces. Musashi weakens Ruse, and the Ankou attempts to reclaim the scythe, but the aura of death Ruse created draws the scythe back, and he absorbs the Ankou and all the souls in Limbo to become Death incarnate. Musashi struggles against Ruse until Tomoe reminds him that fighting for vengeance will only continue the cycle of violence. Recommitted to fighting only for justice, and with the rest of the Oboro fighting Ruse from within, Musashi destroys Ruse, restoring the natural balance and allowing the mantle of Ankou to be passed on. The souls in Limbo enter reincarnation, Chiyo's resistance fighters eliminate the remaining ENE Corp forces, and Musashi and Naoko welcome their newborn son.

== Development ==
Art of Vengeance was part of Sega's initiative to revive some of their dormant franchises. Sega approached Lizardcube, a studio based in Paris, and recruited them as its development partner, after being impressed by their work on Wonder Boy: The Dragon's Trap (2017) and Streets of Rage 4 (2020), both of which were developed under its license. The publisher, however, took a more involved role in Art of Vengeance's development, with the game's producer, Toru Ohara, leading a team to collaborate with Lizardcube and encouraging them to create a more striking art style than what was initially planned. The first three games in the franchise were cited by Lizardcube as their sources of inspiration, though they also attempted to modernize the franchise by refining the game's combat and introducing a combo system.

Art of Vengeance was first teased at The Game Awards on December 7, 2023. The game under its full title was not revealed until a trailer showcasing the gameplay was released on February 12, 2025. The game was released on August 29, 2025 for Windows, Nintendo Switch, PlayStation 4, PlayStation 5, Xbox One and Xbox Series X/S.

== Reception ==
Reception

Aggregate scores
Aggregator	Score
Metacritic	(NS) 85/100 (PC) 86/100 (PS5) 87/100 (XSXS) 87/100
OpenCritic	94% recommend

Review scores
Publication	Score
Destructoid	8.5/10
Game Informer	9.25/10
GameSpot	9/10
GamesRadar+	3/5
Hardcore Gamer	4/5
IGN	8/10
Nintendo Life	8/10
Push Square	9/10
Shacknews	9/10
Video Games Chronicle	5/5

Shinobi: Art of Vengeance received "generally favorable" reviews from critics, according to review aggregator Metacritic.

The game was nominated for "Best Action Game" at The Game Awards 2025.
