= Nightshade (2003 video game) =

- North American cover art
- Developer: Sega AM1
- Publisher: Sega
- Director: Masahide Kobayashi
- Artist: Makoto Tsuchibayashi
- Composers: Fumie Kumatani; Tomonori Sawada; Keiichi Sugiyama; Yutaka Minobe; Teruhiko Nakagawa; Masaru Setsumaru
- Series: Shinobi
- Platform: PlayStation 2
- Release: JP: December 4, 2003; NA: February 10, 2004; PAL: March 5, 2004
- Genres: Action-adventure, hack and slash
- Mode: Single-player

Nightshade (Note: Japanese: Kunoichi (くのいちor くノー; lit. "female ninja")) is a 2003 action-adventure game developed by Sega AM1 and published by Sega for the PlayStation 2. It is the eleventh game in the Shinobi series and follows the exploits of a female ninja named Hibana. The game is a sequel to the 2002 PlayStation 2 game, Shinobi, although it focuses on a new set of characters and a separated plot line.

The game was released for PlayStation 2 consoles in Japan on 4 December 2003, and later for North American and Europe in early 2004. It received mostly positive reviews from critics, with many praising the game's soundtrack, lead character, difficulty, and hack-and-slash combat system but criticizing its camera angles, graphics, and repetitive levels.

== Plot ==
In Nightshade, the player plays as Hibana, a female counterpart to Shinobi's Hotsuma. She is a government-employed ninja tasked with the elimination of members of the Nakatomi Corporation, which has unwittingly unleashed hellspawn upon futuristic Tokyo. She is also ordered to recover the shards of "Akujiki", the legendary cursed sword that Hotsuma used to seal the hellspawn the last time.

=== Main characters ===
- Hibana (緋花)

Voiced by: Atsuko Tanaka (Japanese); Karen Swenson (English)
The main character, Hibana, was born to a branch family of the Oboro lineage, but due to being a girl, she was not allowed to vie for leadership of the clan, and was put up for adoption at an early age to a branch of the Oboro. She is a jaded ninja who was abandoned by Jimushi and now works for the government. The government modeled her sword and outfit after Hotsuma's, the main character of the previous game.

- Jimushi (地蟲)

Voiced by: Sawaki Ikuya (Japanese); Allan Chriest (English)
The Shinobi of Earth and Hibana's former master. One of the Oboro Clan elders, until he seceded and became a government agent. He would become disenchanted with the government and leave, becoming a Nakatomi Mercenary Ninja.

- Kazaguruma (風車)

Voiced by: Unshō Ishizuka (Japanese); Timothy Enos (English)
The Shinobi of Wind and the first Shinobi who confronts Hibana in Jimushi's gang. An honorable warrior who claims that Hibana is his 1,000th opponent.

- Onibi (鬼火)

Voiced by: Wataru Takagi (Japanese); Kevin Miller (English)
The Shinobi of Fire and the second Shinobi who confronts Hibana. He is attracted to Hibana and wants her to kill him.

- Hisui (翡水)

Voiced by: Chiwa Saito (Japanese); Erin Beers (English)
The Shinobi of Water and the third Shinobi who confronts Hibana. She is Jimushi's new apprentice and is essentially Hibana's replacement. However, she despises Hibana because Jimushi prefers her.

- Kurohagane (黒鋼)

Voiced by: Toshitsugu Takashina (Alpha, Japanese), Masao Harada (Beta, Japanese), Hiroshi Iida (Final, Japanese), Casey Robertson (English)
The antagonist, a robotic ninja created by the Nakatomi group ordered to work with Jimushi and retrieve pieces of Akujiki. Although a soulless robot, he begins to have his own agenda with each piece of Akujiki he absorbs.

== Gameplay ==
Nightshade's missions are linear, and each one culminates in a battle against a challenging boss opponent. The core of Nightshade's gameplay is hack and slash, with accumulating combos on spawning enemies about the level. Using Hibana's arsenal of a katana (the primary weapon), short daggers (achieve less damage, but score a higher combo multiplier), shuriken (long range projectiles), and various ninjutsu spells, the game challenges the player to achieve as high a score as possible while eliminating the opposing threat.

Nightshade also includes aspects of platforming. With Hibana's ability to dash in mid-air, the game requires the player to use this ability to bypass holes and hazards. Game mechanics restrict Hibana to only a double-jump and an air-dash before she falls, requiring the player to strike enemies in mid-flight to stay in the air. By doing this, the player combines accuracy and timing to stay in the air continuously or fall to their death.

If the player has a completed save file from Shinobi then Hotsuma, the protagonist of the previous game, is available as an optional playable character. He differs from Hibana in that he does not use daggers like her and is only able to use Akujiki, the sword he used in the previous game. Hotsuma plays exactly as before with the same arsenal of moves and operates under the same mechanics as he did in the previous game. He must always be finding and defeating enemies to feed their souls to Akujiki, or the cursed sword will devour his soul instead and kill him.

== Development ==
=== Soundtrack ===
The Nightshade soundtrack is based upon the Japanese techno of the previous iteration, Shinobi. All tracks were produced by Fumie Kumatani, Tomonori Sawada, Keiichi Sugiyama, Yutaka Minobe, Teruhiko Nakagawa, and Masaru Setsumaru of Sega Digital Studio. Nightshade did not see an official soundtrack release until July 2014, when it was released digitally on Amazon Music and iTunes.

== Reception ==
Reception

Aggregate score
Aggregator	Score
Metacritic	68/100

Review scores
Publication	Score
Edge	6/10
Electronic Gaming Monthly	5.5/10
Eurogamer	4/10
Famitsu	33/40
Game Informer	6.5/10
GamePro	4/5
GameRevolution	B
GameSpot	7.9/10
GameSpy	3/5
GameZone	7.5/10
IGN	7/10
Official U.S. PlayStation Magazine	3.5/5

Nightshade received "average" reviews according to the review aggregation website Metacritic. In Japan, Famitsu gave it a score of one nine and three eighths for a total of 33 out of 40.

== Legacy ==
Hibana, the protagonist of Nightshade, would go on to appear in the 2015 Nintendo 3DS video game, Project X Zone 2.
