= Shinobi (series) =

Video game series by Sega

Shinobi series
- The 2002 logo bears the shinobi kanji (in red) that adorns every title in the series
- Genre: Hack-and-slash
- Developer: Sega
- Publisher: Sega
- Platforms: Arcade, Amiga, Amstrad CPC, Atari ST, Commodore 64, MS-DOS, NES, PC Engine, Master System, ZX Spectrum, MSX, Genesis, Mega-Tech, Mobile, Game Gear, Windows, iPhone, Nintendo eShop, Saturn, PlayStation 2, PlayStation 4, PlayStation 5, Xbox 360, Xbox Series X/S Wii, Nintendo 3DS, Nintendo Switch
- First release: Shinobi; November 16, 1987
- Latest release: Shinobi: Art of Vengeance; August 29, 2025

Shinobi (Note: Japanese: 忍, Hepburn: Shinobi) is a series of hack-and-slash games created by Sega. The ninja (shinobi) Joe Musashi acts as the protagonist of the series. The first Shinobi was released in 1987 as an arcade video game. Along with Alex Kidd and Sonic the Hedgehog, Joe Musashi has long been one of Sega's flagship characters, acting as a mascot for a short time in the late 1980s when ninjas were popular in mainstream media. The series' games are a showcase of Sega's technical accomplishment, noted for their high quality of graphics, gameplay, and music, as well as their high level of difficulty. The Shinobi series sold 5 million copies as of 2024.

== Plot ==
The main character of Shinobi (the original Japanese word for "ninja") is most commonly associated with that of Joe Musashi, the protagonist of the original arcade game and many of its sequels. His name is a combination of both an archetypal Western first name and a Japanese last name, Musashi likely being derived from the legendary Japanese swordsman Miyamoto Musashi. In the manual of The Revenge of Shinobi, Musashi's backstory is told as that of a weak boy who first entered the dojo of the Oboro clan at a young age and gradually, through tireless practice and meditation, worked himself up to become the most skilled and respected ninja of his clan. His peaceful existence in the mountains of Japan is shattered when the ninja crime syndicate Zeed rises to power and attempts to revert Japan into the Sengoku period of civil war when the ninja thrived.

After being defeated by Musashi in the original Shinobi, Zeed reforms three years later as Neo Zeed and attacks the Oboro clan directly. With his master assassinated and his girlfriend Naoko kidnapped by the enemy, Musashi swears revenge, and in the ensuing battles through a series of locations in Japan and America, as chronicled in The Revenge of Shinobi, all but annihilates Neo Zeed. When Neo Zeed returns in Shinobi III: Return of the Ninja Master, Musashi comes out of retirement one last time and destroys them for good.

In the arcade version of Shadow Dancer, Joe Musashi is replaced by a nameless new ninja and his canine companion as the game's protagonists. The ninja and his dog must disarm various time bombs spread across an unnamed metropolis that were planted by a terrorist group. The game was remade for the Mega Drive/Genesis under the title Shadow Dancer: The Secret of Shinobi, with the protagonist's identity differing between regions. The Japanese version identifies him as Joe Musashi's estranged son Hayate (疾風), while the English language manual identifies him as Joe Musashi himself coming out of retirement. In the Master System game The Cyber Shinobi, Zeed has resurfaced once more, this time under the name of Cyber Zeed. A grandson of Joe Musashi must prevent them from threatening the world again.

Shinobi Legions presents a different plotline. The shinobi is Sho, the youngest of two brothers raised by a lone ninja master. The elder brother becomes corrupted and abducts the master's daughter in search of the ultimate ninjitsu technique, and Sho has to prevent him from destroying the world. Neither Joe Musashi nor the Oboro clan is mentioned.

Following a seven-year hiatus in the series, the lead archetype returns in Shinobi for PlayStation 2 as Hotsuma, another member of the Oboro clan. In a similar theme to Shinobi Legions, the game starts with Hotsuma slaying his elder brother Moritsune during a full moon Oboro ritual. The main plot revolves around Hotsuma's battle to defeat a powerful sorcerer called Hiruko and put an end to anarchy in Tokyo. The game features Joe Musashi as a hidden character, as well as Moritsune himself (who appears in the game's storyline as an enemy named Aomizuchi).

In a break with tradition, Nightshade (Kunoichi in Japan) featured a female ninja named Hibana. Hotsuma appears as a hidden character, though it requires a completed Shinobi PS2 game save on the memory card to unlock him. Joe Musashi returns as he did in the PS2 Shinobi by completing 88 missions in the game. The protagonist of the 3DS Shinobi 3D is Jiro Musashi, Joe's father.

== Gameplay ==
The main weapons of Shinobi are the shuriken (or throwing knives), but over the course of the series, the emphasis gradually shifted to a ninjato. One of the most important moves in the game is Shinobi's somersault, performed by tapping the jump button a second time at the height of a jump. The somersault is used to leap onto high places, perform trick jumps, and use the hedgehog shuriken attack to wipe out several opponents at once. The ability to run was introduced in Shinobi III.

Another staple of the series is the four magical ninjitsu attacks Shinobi can use to kill their foes, or improve their own abilities. The four ninjitsu techniques are: Ikazuchi, Fushin, Kariu, and Mijin. Another common feature of the early Shinobi games is the enemy AI, where enemies could duck behind boxes to reload their weapons after firing at Musashi, or hide behind boxes or shields to block Musashi's shurikens.

Each level in Shinobi is usually divided into two or three scenes, and the final scene is a battle against a powerful boss character. Standard Shinobi stages include bamboo forests, dojos, docksides, and industrial complexes filled with biological monstrosities.

== Timeline ==
The following is a timeline of releases in the Shinobi series. Listed are the names of each game, the corresponding release date, and the consoles for which they were developed/ported. Further below is a brief discussion of each release. For a more detailed examination of each game, click on the corresponding link in the timetable.

No.	International title	Japanese title	Year	Game system
1.	Shinobi	Shinobi	1987	Arcade
1.	Shinobi	Shinobi	1988	Master System
1.	Shinobi	Shinobi	1989	Commodore 64, Amiga, Atari ST, Amstrad CPC, ZX Spectrum, MSX, IBM PC, PC Engine, NES
1.	Shinobi	Shinobi	2009	Wii (Virtual Console), Xbox 360 (Xbox Live Arcade)
1.	Shinobi	Shinobi	2020	Nintendo Switch (Sega Ages)
2.	Shadow Dancer	Shadow Dancer	1989	Arcade
2.	Shadow Dancer	Shadow Dancer	1991	Commodore 64, Amiga, Atari ST, Amstrad CPC, Master System, ZX Spectrum
3.	The Revenge of Shinobi	The Super Shinobi	1989	Mega Drive/Genesis
3.	The Revenge of Shinobi	The Super Shinobi	2009	Wii (Virtual Console)
3.	The Revenge of Shinobi	The Super Shinobi	2012	PlayStation 3 (PlayStation Network), Xbox 360 (Xbox Live Arcade), Windows (Steam)
4.	Shadow Dancer: The Secret of Shinobi	Shadow Dancer: The Secret of Shinobi	1990	Mega Drive/Genesis
4.	Shadow Dancer: The Secret of Shinobi	Shadow Dancer: The Secret of Shinobi	2006	PlayStation 2, PSP (Sega Genesis Collection (Note: Unavailable in PAL regions))
4.	Shadow Dancer: The Secret of Shinobi	Shadow Dancer: The Secret of Shinobi	2010	Windows (Steam)
5.	The Cyber Shinobi		1991	Master System
6.	Shinobi	The G.G. Shinobi	1991	Game Gear
6.	Shinobi	The G.G. Shinobi	2012	Nintendo 3DS (Virtual Console)
7.	Shinobi II: The Silent Fury	The G.G. Shinobi II	1992	Game Gear
8.	Shinobi III: Return of the Ninja Master	The Super Shinobi II	1993	Mega Drive/Genesis
8.	Shinobi III: Return of the Ninja Master	The Super Shinobi II	2006	PlayStation 2, PSP (Sega Genesis Collection)
8.	Shinobi III: Return of the Ninja Master	The Super Shinobi II	2007	Wii (Virtual Console)
8.	Shinobi III: Return of the Ninja Master	The Super Shinobi II	2009	PlayStation 3, Xbox 360 (Sonic's Ultimate Genesis Collection)
8.	Shinobi III: Return of the Ninja Master	The Super Shinobi II	2010	Windows (Steam)
8.	Shinobi III: Return of the Ninja Master	The Super Shinobi II	2013	Nintendo 3DS (Virtual Console)
9.	Shinobi Legions (Note: Released as Shinobi X in PAL regions)	Shin Shinobi Den (Note: Roughly translates as New Shinobi Legend or New Ninja Legend)	1995	Sega Saturn
10.	Shinobi	Shinobi	2002	PlayStation 2
10.	Shinobi	Shinobi	2012	PlayStation Network
11.	Nightshade	Kunoichi	2003	PlayStation 2
12.	Shinobi	Shinobi 3D	2011	Nintendo 3DS
13.	Shinobi: Art of Vengeance	Shinobi: Fukushū no Zangeki	2025	PlayStation 5, PlayStation 4, Xbox One, Xbox Series X/S, Nintendo Switch, Windows (Steam)
13.	Shinobi: Art of Vengeance	Shinobi: Fukushū no Zangeki	2026	Nintendo Switch 2

== Series ==
=== Shinobi (1987) ===
Shinobi, the first game in the series, was released in 1987 for the arcades and ran on Sega's System 16 arcade hardware. Sega released a home conversion for the Master System, followed by licensed ports for the IBM PC, Amiga, Atari ST, Commodore 64, Amstrad CPC, ZX Spectrum and MSX, as well as the PC Engine (via Asmik) in Japan, and an unlicensed port by Tengen for the Nintendo Entertainment System in North America. Shinobi introduced several novelties to traditional platform mechanics, such as sophisticated enemy AI and multiple layers in each level.

=== Shadow Dancer (1989) ===
Shadow Dancer is the 1989 arcade sequel to the original Shinobi. It runs on Sega's System 18 arcade hardware. The plot follows an unnamed ninja and his canine companion who must disarm various bombs spread across a city and defeat the terrorist group responsible for planting them.

=== The Revenge of Shinobi (1989) ===
Known as The Super Shinobi in Japan, The Revenge of Shinobi was the series Mega Drive/Genesis debut. Featuring a soundtrack by composer Yuzo Koshiro, the game is widely regarded as the best entry in the series.

=== Shadow Dancer: The Secret of Shinobi (1990) ===
The Mega Drive/Genesis version of Shadow Dancer, titled Shadow Dancer: The Secret of Shinobi and is a different game from the arcade original. The backstory differs between regional releases, giving the unnamed protagonist from the arcade version an identity - the Japanese version establishes him as Hayate, the estranged son of Joe Musashi; while the manuals for the English language versions claim that he is Joe Musashi himself. Although the basic gameplay is similar to the arcade version, little of the actual game content — from levels to character art — is the same.

=== The Cyber Shinobi (1991) ===
The Cyber Shinobi was a Master System exclusive title, released as a follow-up to the Master System port of the original Shinobi. The Cyber Shinobi is notorious for being one of the worst games in the series. Since it is mentioned in the manual that the hero's grandfather defeated Neo Zeed, the Joe Musashi character in this game appears to be the grandson of the original Joe Musashi.

=== The G.G. Shinobi (1991) ===
The debut of Shinobi on the Game Gear system was titled Shinobi, though in Japan it was known as The GG Shinobi (The Game Gear Shinobi) and the game still carries this name internally in all regions. Its gameplay is largely reminiscent of The Revenge of Shinobi. In a take on the Japanese Super Sentai series, Shinobi revolves around the quest of five coloured ninjas (red, pink, blue, yellow, and green) to bring down a powerful crime organization. The game starts with the player just controlling the red ninja and then freeing more and more of his compatriots as he progresses through each level. The soundtrack was once again composed by Yuzo Koshiro.

=== The G.G. Shinobi II: The Silent Fury (1992) ===
The Silent Fury (also The G.G. Shinobi II) is a direct sequel to the original The G.G. Shinobi game on Game Gear, and features much of the same gameplay mechanics as its predecessor. Both The G.G. Shinobi and The Silent Fury were Game Gear exclusive games. It was scored by Yuzo Koshiro and Motohiro Kawashima.

=== Shinobi III: Return of the Ninja Master (1993) ===
Known as The Super Shinobi II in Japan, Shinobi III is regarded by many as the high point of the series. It introduced a much smoother, faster style of gameplay while keeping the series' familiar trademarks firmly intact. The game marked Musashi's last appearance in a Shinobi game until Shinobi was released in 2002 for the PlayStation 2. At least two known beta versions of Shinobi III are currently in circulation, featuring almost completely different levels from the final game.

=== Shinobi Legions (1995) ===
Shinobi Legions was the only Shinobi game developed for Sega Saturn. The gameplay is similar to that of Shinobi III but with many tweaks. The plot represented a break with the traditional storyline of the previous games, as it focuses on an entirely new character named Sho. Shinobi Legions uses live-action cut sequences between each round and digitized live actors in game sequences.

=== Shinobi (2002) ===
Shinobi debuted in the world of 3D gaming with Shinobi, only for PlayStation 2. It is the third game in the series to simply be called Shinobi. The story introduces a new member of the Oboro clan called Hotsuma. Shinobi's gameplay is based upon a combo system called the tate-system, which produces a very fast and smooth style of play. However, even more so than other Shinobi titles, Shinobi is also noted for its extreme difficulty. Whenever Hotsuma dies, the player has to start the level all over again. Although this reboot of the franchise was generally well received by critics and fans alike, some of the bigger complaints waged against the game were for its average graphics, somewhat repetitive gameplay, and (as noted earlier) steep difficulty. Joe Musashi can be unlocked as a playable character after finishing the game.

=== Nightshade (2003) ===
The first game of the Shinobi series to feature a female lead, Nightshade is a continuation of 2002's Shinobi with differences in the gameplay. In Japan, the game is known as Kunoichi, the Japanese term to denote the female equivalent of Shinobi.

=== Shinobi 3D (2011) ===
Shinobi 3D was developed by Griptonite Games for the Nintendo 3DS. The game returned to the side-scrolling nature of earlier games and was released in November 2011. It is the twelfth title in the series since the 1987 original arcade games.

=== Shinobi: Art of Vengeance (2025) ===
A new Shinobi game featuring hand-drawn 2D animation was announced during The Game Awards presentation on December 7, 2023. It was developed by LizardCube, who previously worked on Streets of Rage 4. The game released on August 29, 2025.

== Spin-off games ==
In 1990, Sega released Alex Kidd in Shinobi World on Master System, a spoof of the original Shinobi game in which Alex Kidd takes the position of Joe Musashi. In the game, Alex Kidd has to rescue his girlfriend, a native of Shinobi World, from an evil ninja named Hanzo. A good ninja fuses with him and gives him his powers. Often related to the series is the handheld The Revenge of Shinobi game for Game Boy Advance; however, this game shares only the name and basic premise (ninja action) with other Shinobi titles.

== In other media ==
A comic book series based on the game, written by Alan McKenzie and illustrated by Jon Haward, was published in the UK publication Sonic the Comic between 1993 and 1995 by Sega of Europe, with four stories printed during its run.

The game is referenced in Surf Ninjas, while Adam is playing Sega Game Gear.

Welsh rock band Lostprophets referenced the game in the title of their debut single "Shinobi vs. Dragon Ninja" on their debut album The Fake Sound of Progress in 2000.

In 2014, Sega and Hakuhodo DY formed the production company Stories International for feature film and TV projects based on their Shinobi games. In April 2016, Marc Platt was assigned to produce a live action Shinobi movie through his production banner Marc Platt Productions along with Adam Siegel & Stories President and CEO, Tomoya Suzuki.

In October 2024, Universal Pictures had announced a partnership with SEGA to release a feature film adaptation of Shinobi, which will be directed by Sam Hargrave and written by Ken Kobayashi with producers Marc Platt and Adam Siegel (Marc Platt Productions), alongside Dmitri M. Johnson, Michael Lawrence Goldberg, and Timothy I. Stevenson (Story Kitchen) and Toru Nakahara.

== See also ==
- List of ninja video games
