= Shinobi III: Return of the Ninja Master =

1993 video game

- North American cover art
- Developer: Sega
- Publisher: Sega
- Directors: Tomoyuki Ito; Takeshi Matsuhashi
- Producers: Tomio Takami; Tokinori Kaneyasu
- Designer: Naohisa Nakazawa
- Programmers: Tsukasa Aoki; Toshiaki Yajima; Akio Oi
- Artists: Kazuyuki Iwasawa; Katsuhiko Ogikubo; Hiroyuki Hirama
- Composers: Hirofumi Murasaki; Morihiko Akiyama; Masayuki Nagao
- Series: Shinobi
- Platform: Genesis/Mega Drive
- Release: JP: July 23, 1993; NA: September 1993; EU: September 1993
- Genres: Hack and slash, platform
- Mode: Single-player

Shinobi III: Return of the Ninja Master, released in Japan as The Super Shinobi II, (Note: Japanese: ザ・スーパー忍II, Hepburn: Za Sūpā Shinobi II) is a 1993 hack and slash platform game developed and published by Sega for the Sega Genesis. It is the direct sequel to the previous The Revenge of Shinobi. Shinobi III received critical acclaim and has been ranked among the greatest Genesis games.

== Plot ==
Neo Zeed is threatening the world once more. The evil crime syndicate - thought to have been vanquished two years earlier - has returned, headed by a man known only as the Shadow Master. Joe Musashi has felt their presence and descends from the lonely mountaintops of Japan to face his nemesis once more.

== Development and release ==
Shinobi III was originally set to be released in 1992. Several gaming magazines (including GamePro, Mean Machines, and Computer and Video Games) gave previews and even reviews of the game, showing pictures of levels, enemies, artwork, and special moves which were not seen in the final version at all. Because of general dissatisfaction with the result up to that point, Sega delayed the game for a 1993 release date while the development team worked on improving gameplay and visuals. When Shinobi III was finally released, many game features seen earlier were missing, with new ones taking their place. A beta version of the original version of the game has been leaked and is now widely available as a ROM image.

Shinobi III is included on the Sega Genesis Collection for the PlayStation 2 and PlayStation Portable and Sonic's Ultimate Genesis Collection for the Xbox 360 and PlayStation 3. It was also released for the Wii's Virtual Console service in 2007, for the PC on the download service Steam in 2010, on the iPhone in 2011, for the Nintendo 3DS eShop in 2013, and on the Nintendo Classics service in 2021. The game also appears in Sega Genesis Classics (released as Sega Mega Drive Classics in PAL regions) for Linux, macOS, Nintendo Switch, PlayStation 4, Windows, and Xbox One.

== Reception ==
Reception

Aggregate scores
Aggregator	Score
GameRankings	85% (Genesis); 61% (iOS)
Metacritic	62/100 (iOS)

Review scores
Publication	Score
Computer and Video Games	84% (Mega Drive)
Eurogamer	8/10 (Mega Drive)
GameSpot	7/10 (Genesis)
IGN	8/10 (Genesis); 6.5/10 (iOS)
MegaTech	93% (Mega Drive)
Mega	79% (Mega Drive)
Power Unlimited	90% (Mega Drive)

Award
Publication	Award
MegaTech	Hyper Game (Genesis)

Shinobi III: Return of the Ninja Master received critical acclaim. MegaTech magazine praised the game's new attacks and moves, but criticised that it was "not as hard as The Revenge of Shinobi". Mega said that "beyond the tricky bosses, this is far too easy". An IGN review by Levi Buchanan called it "a legit Genesis great, one of the better action games for the 16-bit console of yesteryear", even if the iPhone version was deemed just "okay". Power Unlimited gave the Mega Drive version a score of 90% summarizing: "Shinobi III is a massive improvement over its predecessor, Revenge of Shinobi. It's a bit easier, but the game moves faster and is therefore less frustrating. Everything from graphics to fighting techniques are fine. Addictive game!"

Complex rated it the third best game on the Sega Genesis, stating: "The only drawback? The last level was freaking impossible!" Retro Gamer included it among their top ten Mega Drive games. In 2023, both Nintendo Life and GameSpot ranked the game among top 15 Mega Drive/Genesis games.

== Legacy ==
Shinobi III influenced later entries in the Shinobi series. Sega producer Yosuke Okunari said that Shinobi for the Nintendo 3DS paid homage to Shinobi III, particularly through its emphasis on a greater variety of character actions.

The game was again a direct inspiration for Shinobi: Art of Vengeance (2025). Lizardcube creative director Ben Fiquet said that the game was specifically inspired by Shinobi III and The Revenge of Shinobi, with powers, moves, enemies, stages and bosses in Art of Vengeance designed to evoke the earlier games.

In 2013, Sega and M2 selected Shinobi III for the Sega 3D Classics series. Okunari described it as the most refined version of the two-dimensional Shinobi games, while M2 president Naoki Horii highlighted the sophisticated programming techniques used to create its sense of visual depth. The demands of converting those effects into stereoscopic 3D led M2 to expand its Mega Drive emulation technology for the project.
