= Shadow Dancer (1989 video game) =

- North American promotional flyer
- Developer: Sega
- Publisher: Sega
- Director: Motoshige Hokoyama
- Series: Shinobi
- Platforms: Arcade, Amiga, Atari ST, Amstrad CPC, Commodore 64, Master System, ZX Spectrum
- Release: NA: May 1989; JP: September 14, 1989; EU: November 1989
- Genres: Platform, hack and slash
- Modes: Single-player, multiplayer
- Arcade system: Sega System 18

Shadow Dancer (Note: Japanese: シャドー・ダンサー, Hepburn: Shadō Dansā) (Note: Somewhat like Shinobi, Shadow Dancer has a kanji form of its name: Kage no Mai (影の舞; lit. "Shadow Dance"). This particular phrase is used extensively throughout the game.) is a 1989 platform game developed and published by Sega for arcades. It was the first game developed for the Sega System 18 arcade board hardware and is a sequel to Shinobi (1987). The player controls a mysterious ninja as he, aided by his attack dog, attempt to take out a terrorist organization. The player goes about this by using ninjutsu abilities and their dog to defeat enemies, as well as collecting bombs that must be obtained to clear a level.

Upon release, Shadow Dancer received a positive reception from critics, who praised the game's soundtrack, graphics, and gameplay but noted that it was derivative of previous titles starring ninja protagonists. The game later received ports for home computers and the Master System. A loose adaptation, titled Shadow Dancer: The Secret of Shinobi, was released for the Sega Genesis in 1990.

== Gameplay ==
The play mechanics of Shadow Dancer are similar to those of the arcade version of the original Shinobi. The controls and almost all of the player's moves from the original Shinobi are present here as well.

The biggest change is the addition of a canine companion that follows the protagonist around. When the dog barks towards an enemy, the player can sic the dog on the enemy by pressing the attack button while crouching, allowing the player an opportunity to attack the enemy while it is being bitten by the dog. However, if the player takes too long to attack the bitten enemy or the enemy has a strong defense, then the dog will be hurt and turn into a harmless pup. The dog will then remain in pup form until the player acquires the next time bomb or finishes the stage.

The player's weapons consist of an unlimited supply of shuriken and a sword, which is used when adjacent to an enemy. When the player collects half of the time bombs in each stage, stronger weapons are granted until the player finishes the stage or loses a life. The player can also use one of three random ninja magic (ninpo) techniques that will clear the entire screen of enemies. Normally, these techniques can only be used once per stage, but if the player continues the game by inserting more coins and pressing START, the protagonist restarts the stage with two units instead of one. Bonus points are awarded if the player completes the stage without using shuriken or ninja magic.

There are four different missions, consisting of three stages for the first mission and four stages each for the remaining three. In the first few stages of each mission, the player must collect a certain number of time bombs scattered throughout the stage to proceed to the goal. The final stage in each mission is a confrontation between him and one of four bosses: an armoured giant throwing energy balls, a weaponized tank engine, a woman hurling metal plates collected from a rack, and a female ninja using magic and a naginata (the dog does not appear during boss battles).

Between each mission, there is a bonus stage minigame seen from the character's perspective as he tosses shuriken at enemy ninjas dropping down from a building. The player is awarded an extra life after completing the minigame.

== Plot ==
The young ninja battles together with his pet dog. In the center of the city, a group of terrorists is committing atrocities, including the planting of time bombs throughout the metropolis. Our young hero and his canine companion set out to gather all the explosives placed by the evil gang and destroy the syndicate that uses them.

The protagonist is never actually named in the original arcade version, although the various home versions give him differing identities. The manual and packaging description for the Master System version identifies him as Takashi, although the attract sequence in this same version contradicts this by naming him Fuma. The manual for the home computer versions produced by U.S. Gold, claims that he is Joe Musashi himself, with one print ad for the game referencing Kato and Sauros (who were characters from the Genesis version).

== Release ==
Following its debut as an arcade game in 1989, Shadow Dancer was released on various home computer formats in Europe in 1991. Versions released for the Amiga, Atari ST, Commodore 64, Amstrad CPC, and ZX Spectrum were published by U.S. Gold and developed by Images. Some of these versions were re-released as budget titles by Kixx in 1993.

The Master System port was released in 1991 and 1992, exclusively, in Brazil and Europe. Although this version bears the title Shadow Dancer: The Secret of Shinobi on the packaging (like the Mega Drive version released in the same year as those aforementioned regions), it is actually based on the arcade version and is simply titled Shadow Dancer in-game. Most of the content from the arcade version was cut, and the play mechanics were modified a bit. Missions now consist of a single side-scrolling stage and a boss encounter. The player's canine companion no longer follows them around, but can still be summoned to kill certain enemies from a distance. Collecting time bombs is now an optional task that the player can conduct while on their way to the goal. When the player gathers all five time bombs in each mission, they will gain an attack power-up for the next boss battle. This version also features bonus stage minigames after completing each mission. While the minigame played after the first and third missions is the same as in the arcade version, the one after the second mission is new: it requires the player to throw shurikens at enemies while both them and the protagonist are in free fall between skyscrapers, and, unlike the other minigame, is played in a third-person perspective.

== Reception ==
Reception

Review scores
Publication	Score
Amiga Action	(Amiga) 84%
Crash	(Spectrum) 77%
GamePro	(Arcade) Positive
Player One	(Master System) 84%
Raze	(Amiga) 89%
Your Sinclair	(Spectrum) 85%
Zero	(Arcade) Positive
Zzap!64	(Amiga/C64) 83%
Commodore Format	(C64) 89%
The One	(Amiga) 80%

Award
Publication	Award
Amstrad Action	Mastergame

In Japan, Game Machine listed it on their January 1, 1990 issue as being the fourth most successful table arcade unit of the month.

Shadow Dancer was well received by critics upon its release in arcades. Sean Kelly of Zero magazine said it was "a pretty impressive" ninja game with "a massive dog/wolf animal thingy that turns into a puppy every time it gets a good kicking" and that, despite being derivative of earlier ninja games (such as Shinobi and Dragon Ninja), it was "good fun" to play. GamePro praised the arcade game as "a slick-looking ninja quest with excellent 3-D backgrounds, jumpin' animation, and top-notch audio."

The home conversions were also well received. Commodore Format awarded this "wonderfully playable", "highly polished and challenging game that no one can really afford to miss" a score of 89% upon its Commodore 64 release, and the same score for its 1993 re-release, while Zzap!64 gave it 83%. Your Sinclair described the ZX Spectrum as an "impressive arcade conversion" and "pretty blimming marvellous" and CRASH called it "is a good scrolly beat-'em-up with arcade adventure overtones" that is "fast, tough and, above all, playable". Amiga Action awarded the Amiga version of Shadow Dancer a review score of 84% and ranked it as the 19th best action game on the system. RAZE gave the Amiga version of Shadow Dancer a score of 89%.

The One gave the Amiga version of Shadow Dancer an overall score of 80%, beginning their review by stating that "if first impressions were anything to go by, then Shadow Dancer would score very highly indeed ... Unfortunately first impressions don't rate very highly and the early promise soon fades". The One criticised the "annoying" lack of checkpoints in levels, and expresses that foreground sprites blend in with the game's backgrounds, "thus making the action a touch confusing". The One praised Shadow Dancer's graphics, calling its backgrounds "noteworthy" and noting the game's large sprites as "reminiscent" of the arcade original, furthermore calling Shadow Dancer "deep" and "colourful". The One also praised the dog companion feature, stating that it "adds a novel strategic twist" to Shadow Dancer's gameplay.

On the other hand, Retro Gamer in 2010 declared it inferior to the Sega Mega Drive's 1990 release Shadow Dancer: The Secret of Shinobi, "let down by surprisingly stodgy controls, uninspired level design, and a really frustrating difficulty level". In contrast, Computer and Video Games considered the original Shadow Dancer arcade game to be superior to the Sega Mega Drive game Shadow Dancer: The Secret of Shinobi. The game sold around 300,000 copies.
