= Shinobi (2011 video game) =

2011 video game

- Developer: Griptonite Games
- Publisher: Sega
- Composers: Norihiko Hibino; Yoshitaka Suzuki; Takahiro Izutani
- Series: Shinobi
- Platform: Nintendo 3DS
- Release: EU: November 11, 2011; NA: November 15, 2011; JP: November 17, 2011
- Genres: Action-adventure, hack and slash
- Mode: Single-player

Shinobi, known in Japan as Shinobi 3D, is a 2011 action-adventure game developed by Griptonite Games and published by Sega for the Nintendo 3DS. It is part of the Shinobi series and was released worldwide in November 2011.

== Gameplay ==
The game is primarily controlled with buttons, but there are mini-games that make use of the touch screen. Player controls the protagonist Jiro Musashi in arcade-style gameplay, similar to the original 2D games. The game is typically played in a 2D side-scrolling fashion, using 3D graphics.

== Plot ==
The game's story begins in the year 1256, Kencho Era Japan, where the young Oboro Clan Leader Jiro Musashi (father of Joe Musashi, the main character from the original Arcade and Sega Genesis Shinobi games) is summoned to defend his home village from the ninja forces of Zeed. After the battle, he is sent 800 years into the future, where Zeed now rules with an iron fist. Aided by Sarah, the leader of a local resistance, Jiro continues his battle against Zeed. As he battles on, he begins to uncover a deeper conspiracy (depending on the level of skill and difficulty). A secret mission is unlocked, revealing an ancient alien Orn that instigated the events in the Kamakura era, including the betrayal of Jiro's own teacher, in hopes of creating the most powerful Ninja army in space. After defeating Orn, the alien's spaceship explodes, and Jiro, protected by a Ninjutsu spell, is last seen re-entering the atmosphere. After landing on Earth, Jiro walks into the horizon, presumably to restart the Oboro Ninja Clan anew. The timeline is altered so Joe Musashi doesn't exist in the 20th Century in this timeline.

== Development ==
The game was revealed in the May 2011 issue of Nintendo Power. Sega originally planned to release the game in September 2011, but due to slow 3DS hardware sales, they postponed the game up until November of that year.

== Reception ==
Reception

Aggregate score
Aggregator	Score
Metacritic	69/100

Shinobi 3D has received mixed to positive reviews, receiving an aggregate score of 69 on Metacritic. Destructoid praised Shinobi 3D for having "tons" of content, but noted that the steep difficulty curve and lack of coherent narrative may turn off some players. Official Nintendo Magazine UK similarly stated that "Shinobi won't be to everyone's tastes since we're now in an age where games are expected to be easy enough for everyone", but said it should be enjoyed by players looking for a challenge. GameSpot praised the way the game reconciles difficulty with accessibility, remarking that the game makes only a few missteps in this, and calls Shinobi 3D "among the small number of quality games in the growing 3DS library worthy of a spot on your shelf". However, GamesTM was more critical of Shinobi 3D, judging the "unsympathetic difficulty" of the game as "cheap and archaic within the context of plodding action". According to Eurogamer: "To call this a bad game would be grossly unfair, but it's a truly unexceptional one. For a series like Shinobi, that is dishonour enough".
