= Shinobi (2002 video game) =

Action-adventure video game

- North American box art
- Developer: Overworks
- Publishers: WW: Sega; EU: Sony Computer Entertainment
- Directors: Masahiro Kumono; Toru Shimizu
- Producer: Takashi Uriu
- Programmer: Kouichi Nomura
- Artist: Makoto Tsuchibayashi
- Composers: Yutaka Minobe; Teruhiko Nakagawa; Tatsuyuki Maeda; Masaru Setsumaru; Fumie Kumatani
- Series: Shinobi
- Platform: PlayStation 2
- Release: NA: November 12, 2002; JP: December 5, 2002; PAL: May 15, 2003
- Genres: Action-adventure, hack and slash
- Mode: Single-player

Shinobi is a 2002 action-adventure game developed by Overworks and published by Sega for the PlayStation 2. It is part of the Shinobi series. The game stars the master ninja Hotsuma, leader of the Oboro clan, who wields Akujiki, a sword that feeds on souls. He can also use ninja magic, shurikens, and special moves. Upon finding a golden castle after an earthquake, Hotsuma makes it his goal to defeat the powerful sorcerer Hiruko, who had summoned hellspawn creatures in Japan to destroy Tokyo. Hotsuma's mission is to stop Hiroko from destroying the world and avenge the death of his clan.

Shinobi was originally planned for the Dreamcast, but due to the discontinuation of the console, the game was moved to the PS2. The game was designed to emphasize the action elements of action-adventure gameplay and appeal to the action market. Other gameplay elements resulted from a desire to mix old and new elements. Upon release, Shinobi was generally well received by critics. A comic book adaptation, soundtrack album, and a sequel entitled Nightshade were also released.

== Gameplay ==
Hotsuma kills an enemy in the game's urban Japanese setting. The necessity of his sword to absorb the souls of his victims creates urgency in the gameplay.

Shinobi is a 3D action-adventure game viewed from a third-person perspective. The player guides protagonist Hotsuma through eight levels that each consist of two sections and a boss battle. Gameplay consists of quickly moving through levels and killing enemies. The game does not feature checkpoints, but allows the player to continue from the start of a boss battle if they die.

Combat is hack and slash-based, involving large numbers of recurring enemies. Hotsuma's sword, Akujiki, is his primary weapon. Akujiki feeds on souls, initially devouring those of the enemies he kills, then those of Hotsuma himself if he does not kill any enemies for too long. This leads to an emphasis on killing all enemies in a battle as quickly as possible. To ensure that Akujiki's hunger remains sated, Hotsuma can kill four or more enemies with no more than a few seconds between each kill to perform an exaggeratedly violent "TATE" attack that will release more souls for Akujiki. The mechanic of jumping from enemies after dispatching them adds an element of platform gameplay.

Hotsuma can also use shurikens to briefly paralyze his enemies. Three types of ninja magic are available to him: "Ka'en", an area-based fire attack; "Kamaitachi", a ranged shock wave attack; and "Raijin", which grants him invincibility for a short period of time.

== Plot ==
=== Backstory ===
Raised together within the Oboro Clan, Hotsuma and Moritsune were seldom apart during their youth. Being the younger of the two, Hotsuma looked up to Moritsune and considered his older brother to be a superior warrior. Eventually, the Oboro Clan commandment was revealed to the two boys after they discovered Akujiki, the evil soul-stealing sword that would be used in the ritual to decide the clan's leader. The commandment deems that the next clan leader must be determined by a duel to the death between the eldest clan heirs—in this case, Moritsune and Hotsuma. Aware of their destiny, the brothers trained incessantly, instructed by their foster parent, Kobushi (previous leader of the Oboro Clan). 10 years passed as the brothers refined their techniques and honed their senses, preparing for the long-time duel and training their skills. The duel occurred beneath a full moon, with only Hotsuma's childhood friend, Ageha, and Kobushi as the witnesses, where, after a long, exhausting fight, Hotsuma won and finally slew his brother, though he felt a great deal of guilt from it.

Four years later, a massive earthquake struck Tokyo, and a mysterious Golden Palace appeared in the center of the destroyed city. With the appearance of the palace came the return of the powerful sorcerer Hiruko, who was thought to have been defeated and sealed by the Oboro Clan long ago. He summoned hellspawn to wreak havoc upon the city, and all but destroyed the Oboro Clan. The city's residents became paralyzed with fear. With the Oboro Clan ravaged and Tokyo on the verge of collapse, Hotsuma placed himself at the heart of the chaos, determined to reach the mysterious Golden Palace and avenge the death of his clan. Along the way, Hotsuma is also forced to battle the slain Oboro ninja who had been reanimated to serve Hiruko.

=== Story ===
The game starts when Hotsuma arrives in Tokyo in a helicopter, and while in position to the Golden Palace, suddenly two hellspawns arrive and crash into the helicopter, and Hotsuma jumps from it. After running through the city alleyways and streets, defeating several tanks and ninjas, he encounters the helicopter, now possessed. Ageha arrives and manages to distract it back into the air. Ageha is mad with Hotsuma exacting his revenge, but he tells her that he does not need her help, and then leaves her and goes through the city roofs, where he encounters a mysterious ninja named Aomizuchi, whom he fights, and Akujiki awakens by tasting his blood. Aomizuchi escapes when the helicopter arrives again, and Hotsuma escapes the fire.

Hotsuma reaches the temples of the Oboro Clan, where Akujiki starts to eat his soul while trying to get rid of the sword. Ageha encounters him and tells him the story about the Akujiki; Akujiki is an evil sword that was longtime hidden during the Oboro Clan rule, and killed many fighters by consuming their souls. Akujiki needs to be fed, or it will eventually consume Hotsuma as well. She explains him that he will need to feed the sword by killing the possessed fighters, whose souls have been darkened, to still Akujiki and prevent it from consuming Hotsuma.

Hotsuma continues through the Oboro Clan's temple, where he encounters several dogs and encounters a twin siblings and his young students, Shirogane and Akagane, who are slowly being possessed and beg Hotsuma to kill them. He destroys them in a battle and takes their souls. After a struggle with another wave of ninjas, he eventually reaches the main shrine of the Oboro Clan. There, Ageha is trying to help Kobushi, who is injured from fighting. Helicopter arrives again, and Hotsuma slices the rocket that was fired at them. He eventually manages to destroy it, but Kobushi dies in Ageha's hands. Hotsuma continues, leaving the temple.

Midway into his journey, Hotsuma encounters a young shrine maiden named Kagari, who believes that she is intended to be sacrificed by Hiruko to release a statue called Yatsurao. She asks Hotsuma to kill her, but feeling guilty over killing his brother and the similarity of the situation where the girl wants him to kill her, he is unable to do it. This leads to her capture by Hiruko's minions. Hotsuma confronts and destroys Yatsurao, but in doing so, allows Hiruko to absorb its power and restore his youth, which had apparently been his plan with Yatsurao the whole time. Hiruko returns to his palace with Hotsuma continuing his pursuit.

Eventually, Ageha meets him and reveals that she released Hiruko. She also reveals that the death match between him and Moritsune was not really to decide the Oboro's leader, but to provide a soul to keep Akujiki sated. Ageha secretly worked with Hiruko to get him to resurrect Moritsune, not knowing that the revived Moritsune would become one of Hiruko's henchmen with no memory of his past. Moritsune is actually Aomizuchi, the fourth hellspawn lord. Moritsune kills Ageha, then fights Hotsuma. Hotsuma defeats him again.

After the battle, Hotsuma breaks to Hiruko's Golden Palace, where Hiruko reveals that he had all along intended for Hotsuma to kill all of the hellspawn and the undead Oboro so that their souls would fuse inside Akujiki. He could then take the sword and use it to rule the world. Hotsuma vows to kill Hiruko and destroy Akujiki, as he blames the evil sword for everything that happened. Hotsuma fights and kills Hiruko after an intense battle, absorbing the sorcerer's soul into Akujiki. He thinks of his brother as the palace crumbles around him. As the military celebrates the collapse of the Golden Palace, Kagari looks on with sadness in her eyes.

== Development ==
Overworks, a division of Sega, had been the developer of the Shinobi series throughout its early years. Other projects had prohibited Overworks from developing Shinobi titles for the Saturn or Dreamcast. However, in 2001, Overworks member Noriyoshi Ohba realized that he had time to develop a new Shinobi game, and Sega returned to publish it. Development of Shinobi began around May 2001, with a team of roughly 50 people. Takashi Uriu filled in as producer. The game was originally planned for the Dreamcast until the console was discontinued, and Sega began creating games for other companies' consoles. The PlayStation 2 console was chosen over the competing GameCube and Xbox because of its familiarity to the team; Uriu had become experienced with the console's software during his past work on the Sakura Wars series. The console's relative popularity was also a decisive factor.

Shinobi marked the jump of the series to 3D. Past Shinobi games made consistent use of shuriken-based combat, which would have been difficult to master in a 3D game. An auto-targeting system was added, and the gameplay emphasis shifted to swordplay rather than shurikens. Due to the 3D rendering of Shinobi, Overworks decided to grant Hotsuma the ability to run on walls. His usage of ninja magic was a recurring feature in the series, implemented as part of a desire to mix older and newer gameplay elements, but his "stealth dash" move was a new addition consistent with the overall fast-paced nature of the game.

The version you see this time is pure action, but in the background, there's a long story, and you have to look for maps and other things. It's still an action game, but you could call it action-adventure. Another is, the games on the market right now classified as 'action-adventure,' we don't feel attracted to those as far as the action goes. You have action [holds one hand to the side], and you have adventure [holds another hand the other way]. Usually, action is two and adventure is eight, as far as the ratio. We want to have that ratio, say, six to four, and bring action more to the forefront.

— Producer Takashi Uriu, after being asked in an interview with IGN about the design of the game in terms of genre.

Although Overworks had worked mainly on simulation and role-playing video games, experience with the Streets of Rage series helped with the creation of an action-based game. Ohba decided to tailor the game to the needs of the relatively small action market amidst the emergence of stealth-oriented ninja-focused games. Uriu was discontent with the state of contemporary action-adventure games. Hotsuma's character, as well as the game's setting and plot, resulted from a desire to create a "darker hero" for the game. Hotsuma's "stealth dash" move hatched from Uriu's knowledge of real life ninja's ability to "divide themselves into different bodies".

Shinobi was showcased at Electronic Entertainment Expo (E3) 2002 together with other prominent Sega titles such as Crazy Taxi 3: High Roller, ToeJam & Earl III: Mission to Earth, and Panzer Dragoon Orta. The game was later exhibited at Tokyo Game Show 2002. Upon completion of development, the game received a rating of "M" (Mature) from the Entertainment Software Rating Board (ESRB), which cited "Blood and Gore" and "Violence".

== Release ==
On September 25, 2003, Shinobi was re-released as part of Japan's The Best budget line with a bonus DVD containing a trailer for Nightshade and gameplay footage played by experienced players.

On March 7, 2012, an emulated version was released in Europe on the PlayStation 3 as part of the PlayStation 2 Classic line. On August 13, 2012, the version came out in North America.

== Related media ==
A single-issue comic book adaptation of Shinobi was created by Scott Allie, published by Dark Horse Comics, and released in 2002. The plot follows Hotsuma and other characters from the game.

=== Soundtrack ===
Shinobi Original Sound Track

Soundtrack album by Sega Digital Studio
- Released: December 21, 2002
- Genre: Traditional Japanese music, techno, rock
- Label: Sten och Flod

Shinobi Original Sound Track (Shinobi オリジナルサウンドトラック) is a video game soundtrack album recorded by Sega's music division Sega Digital Studio. It was released on December 21, 2002, under the Sten och Flod record label. All twenty-one tracks are taken from the game, except for the last which is a bonus track. The soundtrack consists of traditional Japanese music with elements of techno and rock. Hopper noted a "nice old-school flair". Weigand stated that "[a]lthough some of the techno-pop music pieces don't fit the sword-and-sorcery theme, the atmospheric sound effects vibrantly ring true throughout".

| No. | Title | Length |
|---|---|---|
| 1. | "Shinobi (忍)" |
| 2. | "Fate (宿命)" |
| 3. | "Ritual (儀式)" |
| 4. | "Transfiguration (変貌)" |
| 5. | "Moritsune (守恒)" |
| 6. | "Cool Shrine (涼社)" |
| 7. | "Shinobi Boss (忍領)" |
| 8. | "Encounter (遭遇)" |
| 9. | "Combustion (炎上)" |
| 10. | "Imposter Deity (化神)" |
| 11. | "Dirty Maelstrom (濁渦)" |
| 12. | "Strange Machine (奇械)" |
| 13. | "Yatsurao (八面王)" |
| 14. | "Kan'ei Shrine (寛栄寺)" |
| 15. | "Ageha (朱刃)" |
| 16. | "Azure Dragon (蒼龍)" |
| 17. | "Recall (回想)" |
| 18. | "Golden Palace (黄金城)" |
| 19. | "Hiruko (卑瑠呼)" |
| 20. | "Shinobi ~Transient Ballad~ (忍～儚譚～)" |
| 21. | "Quick Moves ~ Mercy Kill (疾手～介錯)" |

== Reception ==
Reception

Aggregate scores
| Aggregator | Score |
|---|---|
| GameRankings | 71.67% |
| Metacritic | 71/100 |

Review scores
| Publication | Score |
|---|---|
| AllGame | 4/5 |
| Electronic Gaming Monthly | 7.33/10 |
| Eurogamer | 3/10 |
| Famitsu | 32/40 |
| Game Informer | 8/10 |
| GamePro | 4.5/5 |
| GameSpot | 7.6/10 |
| GameSpy | 3/5 |
| GameZone | 8/10 |
| IGN | 7.8/10 |
| Official U.S. PlayStation Magazine | 3.5/5 |
| Entertainment Weekly | B− |

Shinobi's initial release fell on November 12, 2002, in North America; December 5 in Japan; and May 15, 2003, in Europe. It was generally well received by critics, with respective scores of 71 out of 100 and 71.67% from review aggregators Metacritic and GameRankings.

Shinobi's basic gameplay was largely praised. GamePro's Mike Weigand highlighted the TATE attack as "cool" and "hyper-violent", and praised the game's overall emphasis on "head-on deception" rather than stealth. GameZone staff writer Steven Hopper stated that "[w]hile some would want a bit more depth from a ninja game, I think the arcade-style gameplay keeps the game close to its roots". IGN's David Smith and GameSpy's Benjamin Turner criticized the poor artificial intelligence and repetitiveness of the basic enemies while praising the bosses.

Critics consistently mentioned the game's high difficulty. The game was described as "hellaciously hard" by Electronic Gaming Monthly staff writer Che Chou and as "ninja tough" in a review from 1UP.com. Weigand cautioned: "Casual gamers beware", noting that earlier Shinobi titles had not been as demanding. Hopper called it "the toughest game I’ve played in a long time".

Level design was received generally poorly. 1UP.com highlighted repetitive environmental textures as contributing to the difficulty of finding one's way through the levels, comparing them to textures that might be found in PlayStation games. Smith echoed this opinion, additionally noting occasionally problematic default camera angles. Hopper stated that "[m]ost of the environments look very nice and detailed, while some are a little plain". Turner called the environments overall "samey" and "uninspired".

The newly introduced Hotsuma was singled out for strong praise. Smith called Hotsuma "a great design, a sort of post-modern evolution of the ninja in comparison to the thoroughly traditional Joe Musashi [the main protagonist of the series]", additionally commending the coordination of his moves with his appearance. 1UP.com stated that he is "the supermodel of video-game action heroes—lean, stylish and mean—and he fights as good as he looks". Turner and Allgame's Brett Alan Weiss described him as "sleek". Weiss offered strong praise for Akujiki, as did Weigand for Hotsuma's scarf.

== Sequel ==
Nightshade, a sequel to Shinobi, was later developed by Wow Entertainment and again published by Sega for the PlayStation 2. The game stars female ninja Hibana, who is stylistically and kinetically analogous to Hotsuma. Nightshade's Japanese title Kunoichi refers to a female ninja, just as Shinobi refers to a male ninja. The gameplay is also structured similarly to Shinobi's. Hotsuma appears as a secret character in the game. The game was released on December 4, 2003.
