= Alex Kidd in Shinobi World =

1990 video game

- Developer: Sega
- Publisher: Sega
- Designer: Yoshio Yoshida
- Artist: Gen Adachi
- Composer: Tadahiko Inoue
- Series: Alex Kidd; Shinobi
- Platform: Master System
- Release: NA: 1990; EU: 1990
- Genres: Platform, hack and slash
- Mode: Single-player

Alex Kidd in Shinobi World is a side-scrolling action game from Sega for the Master System in 1990. Developed in Japan, it was released for the overseas market (North America, Europe and Brazil). The game stars Alex Kidd in a parody version of Sega's ninja-themed action game Shinobi, where Alex Kidd fights against caricatures of many of the enemies from Shinobi. It was re-released for the Wii Virtual Console on December 11, 2009 in Europe, and on February 1, 2010 in North America.

== Gameplay ==
Gameplay screenshot

Despite being part of the Alex Kidd series, the game mechanics of Shinobi World are different from Alex Kidd in Miracle World and are much closer to the Master System version of Shinobi. Alex Kidd's basic attack is a sword slice, which can be used not only to destroy enemies but also to open treasure chests. Inside such chests, the player can obtain items such as more health, throwing darts, a powered-up sword, extra lives, and a magic ball that will temporarily turn Alex Kidd into an invincible tornado. The throwing darts and powered-up sword will both replace the Alex's default sword until the player completes the stage, defeats a boss or loses a life. Other actions that Alex Kidd can perform include a wall-to-wall jump and the ability to turn into a flying fireball after spinning around a street post, a rope or a horizontal bar.

Alex starts off each round with three hit points but can fill out his health gauge to a maximum of six hit points. When the player has full health, all the treasure chests carrying hearts will carry extra lives in their place. When the player defeats a boss with full health, they will gain a "Perfect Bonus" after completing the round. There is also a "Secret Bonus" if the player completes an entire round without getting hit or losing life at any point.

The game is composed of four different rounds roughly based on the missions from the original Shinobi, which are divided into three stages. The third stage in each round is a boss battle.

== Story ==
An evil being known as Hanzo the Dark Ninja escapes after 10,000 years of confinement and kidnaps Alex Kidd's new girlfriend, while the pair are on a leisurely trip to the planet Shinobi. Powerless to stop the villain, Alex collapses into a sobbing heap, but is found by the ghost of the ancient warrior who originally vanquished the Dark Ninja, who explains that Hanzo intends to sacrifice Alex's girlfriend as part of a ritual to conquer the world. The spirit of the ancient warrior fuses itself with Alex's body; lending Alex his strength, skills, and courage; and with their combined power, they set out to save Alex's girlfriend and vanquish the Dark Ninja once and for all.

== Development ==
Shinobi Kid with original Round 1 boss "Mari-Oh"

Alex Kidd in Shinobi World began development as Shinobi Kid, a stand-alone spin-off of Shinobi with no ties to the Alex Kidd series. The boss of Round 1, called Kabuto in the released version of the game, also had a different design in the prototype. He was originally named "Mari-Oh" and was designed as a pastiche of Mario, the mascot of rival game developer Nintendo, and the Shinobi villain Ken-Oh, hence the name. Like his Nintendo namesake, after sustaining enough damage, Mari-Oh shrinks to a smaller size. Although Mari-Oh was renamed Kabuto, with a redesign that downplayed his likeness to Mario, his attack pattern remained unchanged from the prototype.

== Reception ==
Reception

Review scores
Publication	Score
AllGame	3.5/5
Computer and Video Games	92%
Console XS	85%
Game Mania	90%
Sega Power	88%
Sega Pro	88%

Alex Kidd in Shinobi World was critically acclaimed upon release. Computer and Video Games magazine gave the game a score of 92% in its September 1990 issue. The reviewer Robert Swan stated that the "game is brill! A combination of Alex Kidd in Miracle World and Shinobi" that "works really well." He praised the playability that "becomes progressively more difficult as you go along," and concluded that it is a "great game" overall. In 1991, Computer and Video Games described the game as "probably the best in the Alex series so far" and "a hilarious mixture of Alex Kidd and Shinobi." Sega Pro magazine gave the game a score of 88% in its inaugural November 1991 issue, describing it as a "huge game" with "so much to do that addiction is guaranteed."

Retrospectively, Allgame gave a rating of 3.5 out of 5 stars, praising the game for being a successful combination of both Shinobi and the Alex Kidd games, including the game characters and game music from Shinobi while retaining the platforming style from Alex Kidd, although giving criticism to the gameplay especially boss attack patterns and jumps being obvious and too easy for older experienced players.
