= List of role-playing video games: 2016 to 2017 =

This is a comprehensive index of commercial role-playing video games (RPGs), sorted chronologically by year. Information regarding release platform, release type, RPG subgenre, game setting, developers, publishers, and country of origin is provided where available. The table can be sorted by clicking on the small boxes next to the column headings.

This list includes all RPG subgenres, including MMORPGs, Action RPGs and Tactical RPGs. This list does not include MUDs and Roguelikes by default, unless they have an additional RPG subgenre. For standalone lists on these subgenres, see List of MUDs and List of roguelikes

== Legend ==
Video game platforms
| 3DS | Nintendo 3DS, 3DS Virtual Console, iQue 3DS | DROID | Android | iOS | iOS, iPhone, iPod, iPadOS, iPad, visionOS, Apple Vision Pro |
| LIN | Linux, SteamOS | OSX | macOS | NS | Nintendo Switch |
| PS4 | PlayStation 4 | PSV | PlayStation Vita | Quest | Meta Quest / Oculus Quest family, including Oculus Rift |
| Stadia | Google Stadia | WEB | Browser game | WIN | Windows, all versions Windows 95 and up |
| XBO | Xbox One | | | | |

Types of releases
| Compilation | A compilation, anthology or collection of several titles, usually (but not always) belonging to the same series |
| Early access | A game launched in early access is unfinished and thus might contain bugs and glitches or have some of the content missing |
| Episodic | An episodic video game that is released in batches over a period of time |
| Expansion | A large-scale DLC to an already existing game that adds new story, areas and additions and/or changes to the game's mechanics |
| Full release | A full release of a game that launched in early access first |
| Limited | A special release (often called "Limited" or "Collector's Edition") with bonus collector's material. Often provided to people who pre-order a game |
| Port | The game first appeared on a different platform and a port was made. The game is like the original, with few or no differences |
| Remake | The game is an enhanced remake of an original, made using a new engine and/or assets and thus containing completely new sound, graphics and possibly changes to the story and/or gameplay |
| Remaster | The game is a remaster of an original, released on the same or different platform, with (usually minor) changes to graphics, sound and/or gameplay |
| Rerelease | The game was re-released on the same platform with no or only minor changes |

Video game genres
| Action RPG | Action role-playing game | Dungeon crawl | Dungeon crawl | JRPG | Japanese-style role-playing game |
| MMORPG | Massively multiplayer online RPG | Monster tamer | Monster-taming game | MUD | Multi-user dungeon |
| Real-time | Real-time game | Roguelike | Roguelike, Roguelite | Sandbox | Sandbox game |
| Soulslike | Soulslike | Tactical RPG | Tactical role-playing game | Turn-based | Turn-based game |

== List ==
| Year | Title | Platform | Type | RPG Subgenre | Setting | Developer | Publisher | COO | Ref. |
|---|---|---|---|---|---|---|---|---|---|
| 2016 (WW) | 7 Mages | DROID, LIN, WIN, OSX, iOS | Original | Turn-based, Dungeon crawl | Fantasy | Napoleon Games | | CZ | |
| 2016 | 7th Dragon III Code: VFD | 3DS | | | | | | | |
| 2016 (WW) | Adventures of Mana | DROID, iOS, PSV | Remake | Action RPG | Fantasy | Square Enix | | JP | |
| 2016 (JP) | Akiba's Beat | PS4 | Original | Action RPG | Urban fantasy | Acquire | | JP | |
| 2016 | Alienation | PS4 | | | | | | | |
| 2016 | Anima: Gate of Memories | WIN, LIN, PS4, XBO | Original | Action RPG | Fantasy | Anima Project | Badland Indie | ES | |
| 2016 | Armello | XBO | | | | | | | |
| 2016 | Assassin's Creed Identity | iOS | | Action RPG | | | | | |
| 2016 | Atelier Sophie: The Alchemist of the Mysterious Book | PSV, PS4 | | | | | | | |
| 2016 (WW) | Aurion: Legacy of the Kori-Odan | WIN | Original | Action RPG | Fantasy | Kiro'o Games | | CM | |
| 2016 | Avadon 3: The Warborn | WIN, OSX | | | | | | | |
| 2016 | Baldur's Gate: Siege of Dragonspear | DROID, WIN | Original | | Fantasy | Beamdog | | | |
| 2016 | The Banner Saga | PS4, XBO | | Tactical RPG | | | | | |
| 2016 | The Banner Saga 2 | WIN, OSX, XBO, PS4 | | Tactical RPG | | | | | |
| 2016 | Bastion | XBO | | Action RPG | | | | | |
| 2016 (JP) | Berserk | PS3, PS4, PSV | | Action RPG | | | | | |
| 2016 | Black Desert Online | WIN | | MMORPG | | | | | |
| 2016 | Blade & Soul | WIN | | MMORPG | | | | | |
| 2016 | Bravely Second: End Layer | 3DS | | | | | | | |
| 2016 | Champions of Anteria | WIN | Original | Action RPG | Fantasy | Blue Byte | Ubisoft | DE | |
| 2016 | Chronos | Quest | | | | | | | |
| 2016 | Code of Princess | WIN | | Action RPG | | | | | |
| 2016 | Conception II: Children of the Seven Stars | WIN | | | | | | | |
| 2016 | Criminal Girls 2: Party Favors | PSV | | | | | | | |
| 2016 | Dark Souls III | WIN, PS4, XBO | Original | Action RPG | Fantasy | FromSoftware | Bandai Namco Entertainment, FromSoftware | | |
| 2016 | Darkest Dungeon | LIN, WIN, OSX, PSV, PS4 | Original | Dungeon crawl | Fantasy | Red Hook Studios | | CA | |
| 2016 | DarkMaus | | Original | Action RPG | | Daniel Wright | | | |
| 2016 | Dead Island: Definitive Edition | WIN, PS4, XBO | | Action RPG | | | | | |
| 2016 (JP) | Demon Gaze II | PSV | | Dungeon crawl | | | | | |
| 2016 | Destiny: Rise of Iron | PS4, XBO | | Action RPG | Sci-Fi | Bungie | Activision Publishing, Inc. | US | |
| 2016 | Deus Ex: Mankind Divided | WIN, LIN, PS4, XBO | | Action RPG | Sci-Fi, Cyberpunk | Eidos Montreal | Square Enix | CA | |
| 2016 | Digimon Story: Cyber Sleuth | PS4, PSV | | | | | | | |
| 2016 | Digimon World: Next Order | PSV, PS4 | | | Modern, Cyberpunk | B.B. Studio | Bandai Namco Entertainment | JP | |
| 2016 | Disgaea PC | WIN | | Tactical RPG | | | | | |
| 2016 | Dragon Ball Fusions | 3DS | | | Fantasy | Ganbarion | Namco | | |
| 2016 | Dragon Ball Xenoverse 2 | PS4, XBO, WIN | Original | Action RPG | Fantasy | Dimps | Bandai Namco Entertainment | JP | |
| 2016 (WW) | Dragon Quest Builders | PS3, PS4, PSV | | Action RPG, Open world | Fantasy | Square Enix | | JP | |
| 2016 | Dragon Quest Monsters: Joker 3 | 3DS | | | Fantasy | Tose | Square Enix | JP | |
| 2016 | Dragon Quest VII: Fragments of the Forgotten Past | 3DS | | | | | | | |
| 2016 | Dragon's Dogma: Dark Arisen | WIN | | Action RPG | | | | | |
| 2016 | The Dwarves | WIN, OSX, LIN, PS4, XBO | | Tactical RPG | | | | | |
| 2016 | Dying Light: The Following | LIN, WIN, PS4, XBO | | Action RPG | Horror, Modern, Zombie Apocalypse | Techland | Warner Bros. Interactive Entertainment | PL | |
| 2016 | Earthlock: Festival of Magic | PS4, XBO | | | | | | | |
| 2016 | The Elder Scrolls V: Skyrim — Special Edition | WIN, PS4, XBO | Remaster | Action RPG | | | | | |
| 2016 | Ember | WIN, OSX, iOS | | | | | | | |
| 2016 | Enderal | WIN | Original | Action RPG | Fantasy | SureAI | | DE | |
| 2016 | The Escapists: The Walking Dead | PS4 | | | | | | | |
| 2016 (JP) | Etrian Odyssey V | 3DS | | Dungeon crawl | | | | | |
| 2016 | Etrian Odyssey V: Beyond the Myth | 3DS | | | | Atlus | | | |
| 2016 | Exist Archive: The Other Side of the Sky | PS4, PSV | | | | | | | |
| 2016 | Fairy Fencer F: Advent Dark Force | PS4 | | | | | | | |
| 2016 | Final Fantasy Explorers | 3DS | | Action RPG | | | | | |
| 2016 | Final Fantasy IX | iOS, DROID, WIN | | | | | | | |
| 2016 | Final Fantasy Type-0 Online | DROID, WIN, iOS | | | Fantasy | | | | |
| 2016 | Final Fantasy X/X-2 HD Remaster | WIN | | | Fantasy | Square Enix | | | |
| 2016 | Final Fantasy XV | PS4, XBO | | Action RPG, Open world | Fantasy | Square Enix | | | |
| 2016 | Fire Emblem Fates | 3DS | | Tactical RPG | Fantasy | Intelligent Systems | Nintendo | | |
| 2016 | FNaF World | WIN | | | Horror | Scott Cawthon | | | |
| 2016 | Genkai Tokki: Seven Pirates | PSV | | | | Felistella | Compile Heart | JP | |
| 2016 | Girl's Frontline | iOS, DROID | | Tactical RPG | | | | | |
| 2016 | God Eater 2: Rage Burst | WIN, PS4, PSV | | Action RPG | | | | | |
| 2016 | God Eater: Resurrection | PS4, PSV, WIN | | Action RPG | | | | | |
| 2016 | Grand Kingdom | PS4, PSV | | Tactical RPG | | | | | |
| 2016 | Grim Dawn | WIN, XBO | Original | Action RPG | Dark fantasy | Crate Entertainment | | US | |
| 2016 | Grind Zones | WIN | | | | Odnako Games | | | |
| 2016 | Halcyon 6: Starbase Commander | WIN | | | | | | | |
| 2016 | Harvest Moon: Skytree Village | 3DS | | | | | | | |
| 2016 | Honkai Impact 3rd | WIN, IOS, DROID | Original | Action RPG | Fantasy | miHoYo | | CN | |
| 2016 | Hyper Light Drifter | WIN, OSX, PS4, XBO | | Action RPG | | | | | |
| 2016 | Hyperdevotion Noire: Goddess Black Heart | WIN | | Tactical RPG | | | | | |
| 2016 | Hyperdimension Neptunia U: Action Unleashed | WIN | | Action RPG | | | | | |
| 2016 (WW) | I Am Setsuna | PS4, PSV, WIN | | | | Tokyo RPG Factory | Square Enix | JP | |
| 2016 | Ittle Dew 2 | WIN, PS4, XBO | | | | | | | |
| 2016 | Kim | WIN, OSX | | | | | | | |
| 2016 | The Legend of Heroes: Trails of Cold Steel II | PS3, PSV | | | | | | | |
| 2016 | Lineage 2: Revolution | iOS, DROID | | MMORPG | | Netmarble Neo | Netmarble | | |
| 2016 | Little King's Story | WIN | | | | | | | |
| 2016 | Lost Reavers | WiiU | | Action RPG | | | | | |
| 2016 | Mario & Luigi: Paper Jam | 3DS | | | | | | | |
| 2016 | Marvel: Ultimate Alliance | WIN, PS4, XBO | | Action RPG | | | | | |
| 2016 | Marvel: Ultimate Alliance 2 | WIN, PS4, XBO | | Action RPG | | | | | |
| 2016 | Megadimension Neptunia VII | PS4, WIN | | | | | | | |
| 2016 | MegaTagmension Blanc + Neptune VS Zombies | WIN | | | | | | | |
| 2016 | MeiQ: Labyrinth of Death | PSV | | Dungeon crawl | | | | | |
| 2016 | The Metronomicon: Slay the Dance Floor | WIN, OSX | | Action RPG | | | | | |
| 2016 | Mind Zero | WIN | | Dungeon crawl | | | | | |
| 2016 | Mobius Final Fantasy | iOS, DROID | | | | | | | |
| 2016 (NA/EU) | Monster Hunter Generations | 3DS | Original | Action RPG | Fantasy | Capcom | | JP | |
| 2016 (JP) | Monster Hunter Stories | 3DS | Original | Turn-based, Monster tamer | Fantasy | Marvelous | Capcom | JP | |
| 2016 | Moon Hunters | WIN | | Action RPG | | | | | |
| 2016 | Mordheim: City of the Damned | PS4, XBO | | Tactical RPG | | | | | |
| 2016 | Mount & Blade II: Bannerlord | | | Action RPG | Fantasy | TaleWorlds | | | |
| 2016 | Mugen Souls Z | WIN | | | | | | | |
| 2016 | Mystery Chronicle: One Way Heroics | WIN | | | | | | | |
| 2016 | Necropolis | WIN, OSX, LIN, PS4, XBO | | Action RPG | | Harebrained Schemes | Bandai Namco Entertainment, Harebrained Schemes | US | |
| 2016 | Nights of Azure | PS4 | | Action RPG | | Gust Co. Ltd. | Koei Tecmo Holdings | | |
| 2016 | Odin Sphere Leifthrasir | PS3, PS4, PSV | | Action RPG | | | | | |
| 2016 | Paper Mario: Color Splash | WiiU | | | | | | | |
| 2016 (JP) | Persona 5 | PS3, PS4 | | | | | | | |
| 2016 | Phantom Brave PC | WIN | | Tactical RPG | | | | | |
| 2016 | Pillars of Eternity: The White March — Part 2 | WIN | | | | | | | |
| 2016 | Pocket Mortys | DROID, iOS | | | | | Adult Swim | GB | |
| 2016 (WW) | Pokémon Sun and Moon | 3DS | Original | Turn-based, Monster tamer | Fantasy | Game Freak | The Pokémon Company | JP | |
| 2016 | Pokémon Uranium | WIN | | Turn-based, Monster tamer | Fantasy | | | | |
| 2016 | Portal Knights | WIN, PS4, XBO | | Action RPG | Fantasy | Keen Games | 505 Games | | |
| 2016 | Project X Zone 2 | 3DS | | Tactical RPG | | | | | |
| 2016 | Ray Gigant | PSV, WIN | | | | | | | |
| 2016 (JP) | SaGa: Scarlet Grace | PSV | | | | | | | |
| 2016 | Salt and Sanctuary | PS4, WIN | | Action RPG | | Ska Studios | | | |
| 2016 (JP/NA) | Shin Megami Tensei IV: Apocalypse | 3DS | | | Sci-fi, Apocalyptic | Atlus | Deep Silver, Atlus | JP | |
| 2016 | Shiren the Wanderer: The Tower of Fortune and the Dice of Fate | PSV | | Roguelike | | | | | |
| 2016 | Shroud of the Avatar: Forsaken Virtues | LIN, WIN, OSX | | | Fantasy | Portalarium | | | |
| 2016 | Skylanders: Imaginators | PS3, PS4, WiiU, XB360, XBO | | | | | | | |
| 2016 | Slashy Souls | iOS, DROID | | Action RPG | | | | | |
| 2016 (JP/NA) | Star Ocean: Integrity and Faithlessness | PS4 | | Action RPG | Fantasy, Sci-Fi | Tri-Ace | Square Enix | JP | |
| 2016 | Star Trek Online | PS4, XBO | | MMORPG | | | | | |
| 2016 | Stardew Valley | WIN, OSX, LIN, PS4, XBO | | | | | | | |
| 2016 | Stories: The Path of Destinies | WIN, PS4 | | Action RPG | Steampunk | | | CA | |
| 2016 | Stranger of Sword City | XBO, PSV | | Dungeon crawl | | | | | |
| 2016 | Super Dungeon Bros | WIN, PS4, XBO | | Action RPG | | | | | |
| 2016 (JP) | Super Robot Wars Original Generation: The Moon Dwellers | PS3, PS4 | | Tactical RPG | | | | | |
| 2016 | Sword Art Online: Hollow Realization | PS4, PSV | | | Sci-Fi, Cyberpunk | | Bandai Namco Entertainment | | |
| 2016 | Sword Coast Legends | PS4, XBO | | Action RPG | | | | | |
| 2016 | Tahira: Echoes of the Astral Empire | WIN, OSX, LIN | Original | Tactical RPG | | | | | |
| 2016 (JP) | Tales of Berseria | PS4, PS3 | Original | Action RPG | Fantasy | Bandai Namco Entertainment | | JP | |
| 2016 | Tales of Symphonia HD | WIN | | | | | | | |
| 2016 | The Technomancer | WIN, PS4, XBO | | Action RPG | | | | | |
| 2016 | Teenage Mutant Ninja Turtles Legends | | | | | | | CA | |
| 2016 | The Banner Saga 2 | | Original | Tactical RPG | | Stoic | Versus Evil | | |
| 2016 | The Caligula Effect | PSV | Original | | | Aquria | Furyu Corporation, Atlus USA | JP | |
| 2016 | The Legend of Heroes: Trails at Sunrise | PSV, PS4, WEB | | | | UserJoy Technology | | | |
| 2016 | The Technomancer | WIN | | Action RPG | Sci-Fi, Fantasy, Cyberpunk | Spiders | Focus Home Interactive | | |
| 2016 | The Witcher 3: Wild Hunt – Blood and Wine | WIN, PS4, XBO | | Action RPG | Fantasy | CD Projekt | | PL | |
| 2016 | Tokyo Mirage Sessions ♯FE | WiiU | | | | | | | |
| 2016 | Tokyo Twilight Ghost Hunters Daybreak: Special Gigs | PS3, PS4, PSV | | Tactical RPG | | | | | |
| 2016 | Tom Clancy's The Division | WIN, PS4, XBO | | Action RPG, Open world | Modern | Ubisoft Massive | Ubisoft | | |
| 2016 (JP) | Toukiden 2 | PS3, PS4, PSV | | Action RPG | | | | | |
| 2016 | Trillion: God of Destruction | PSV, WIN | | | | | | | |
| 2016 | Tyranny | WIN, OSX, LIN | Original | | Fantasy | Obsidian Entertainment | Paradox Interactive | US | |
| 2016 | Undertale | LIN | | | | | | | |
| 2016 | Unepic | PS4, PSV | | | | | | | |
| 2016 (WW) | Valkyria Chronicles Remastered | PS4 | | Tactical RPG | | | | | |
| 2016 | Valkyrie Anatomia: The Origin | DROID, iOS | Original | | Fantasy | Square Enix | | JP | |
| 2016 | Way of the Samurai 3 | WIN | | Action RPG | | | | | |
| 2016 | The Witch and the Hundred Knight: Revival Edition | PS4 | | Action RPG | | | | | |
| 2016 | World of Final Fantasy | PS4, PSV | | | Fantasy | Square Enix | | | |
| 2016 | World of Warcraft: Legion | WIN, OSX | | MMORPG | | | | | |
| 2016 | Xanadu Next | WIN | | Action RPG | | | | | |
| 2016 | XCOM 2 | WIN, OSX, LIN, PS4, XBO | | Tactical RPG | | | | | |
| 2016 | XCOM: Enemy Unknown | PSV | | Tactical RPG | | | | | |
| 2016 | Yo-kai Watch 2 | 3DS | | | | | | | |
| 2017 | .hack//G.U. Last Recode | WIN, PS4 | | Action RPG | Sci-Fi, Cyberpunk | CyberConnect2 | Bandai Namco Entertainment | | |
| 2017 | Absolver | WIN, PS4 | | Action RPG | | Sloclap | Devolver Digital | | |
| 2017 (JP) | Accel World vs. Sword Art Online: Millennium Twilight | PS4, PSV | Original | Action RPG | Fantasy | Artdink | Bandai Namco Entertainment | JP | |
| 2017 (WW) | Akiba's Beat | PS4, PSV | Original | Action RPG | Urban fantasy | Acquire | Acquire|, PQube, Xseed Games | JP | |
| 2017 (JP) | The Alliance Alive | 3DS | | | | | | | |
| 2017 | Another Eden | DROID, iOS | | | | | | | |
| 2017 | Aporia: Beyond the Valley | WIN | | Action RPG | | Investigate North | Green Man Gaming | | |
| 2017 | Assassin's Creed Origins | WIN, PS4, XBO, Stadia | Original | Action RPG | Historical, Science Fiction | Ubisoft Montreal | Ubisoft | CA | |
| 2017 | Atelier Firis: The Alchemist and the Mysterious Journey | WIN, PS4, PSV | | | | | | | |
| 2017 | Atelier Shallie Plus: Alchemists of the Dusk Sea | PSV | | | | | | | |
| 2017 | Atelier Sophie: The Alchemist of the Mysterious Book | WIN | | | | | | | |
| 2017 | Berserk and the Band of the Hawk | WIN, PS4, PSV | | Action RPG | | | | | |
| 2017 | Black Souls I | WIN | | | | | | | |
| 2017 (JP) | Blue Reflection | PS4, PSV | Original | | | Gust Co. Ltd. | Koei Tecmo Holdings | JP | |
| 2017 | The Caligula Effect | PSV | | | | | | | |
| 2017 | Cat Quest | NS | | Action RPG | | | | | |
| 2017 | Chroma Squad | PS4, XBO | | Tactical RPG | | | | | |
| 2017 | Cladun Returns: This is Sengoku! | WIN, PS4, PSV | | Action RPG | | | | | |
| 2017 | Cosmic Star Heroine | WIN, PS4 | | | | | | | |
| 2017 | Criminal Girls: Invite Only | WIN | | | | | | | |
| 2017 | Cyberdimension Neptunia: 4 Goddesses Online | PS4 | Original | Action RPG | Sci-Fi, Cyberpunk | Compile Heart, Tamsoft | Idea Factory | | |
| 2017 | Dark Rose Valkyrie | PS4 | | | | | | | |
| 2017 | Demon Gaze II | PS4, PSV | | Dungeon crawl | | | | | |
| 2017 | Destiny 2 | WIN, PS4, XBO | Original | Action RPG | Sci-Fi | Bungie | Activision Publishing, Inc. | | |
| 2017 | Detention | LIN, WIN, OSX | | | Horror, Modern | Red Candle Games | | TW | |
| 2017 | Digimon Story: Cyber Sleuth – Hacker's Memory | WIN, PS4, PSV, NS | Original | Turn-based | Fantasy | Media.Vision | Bandai Namco Entertainment | JP | |
| 2017 | Digimon World: Next Order | PS4 | | | | | | | |
| 2017 | Disgaea 2 | WIN | | Tactical RPG | | | | | |
| 2017 | Disgaea 5 Complete | NS | | Tactical RPG | | | | | |
| 2017 | Divinity: Original Sin II | WIN | | | Fantasy | Larian Studios | | BE | |
| 2017 | Dragon Ball Xenoverse 2 | NS | | | | | | | |
| 2017 | Dragon Quest Heroes II | WIN, PS4 | | Action RPG | | | | | |
| 2017 | Dragon Quest VIII: Journey of the Cursed King | 3DS | | | | | | | |
| 2017 (JP) | Dragon Quest XI | 3DS, PS4 | Original | | Fantasy | Square Enix | | JP | |
| 2017 (JP) | Dragon's Dogma: Dark Arisen | PS4, XBO | | Action RPG | | | | | |
| 2017 | Dynasty Warriors: Godseekers | PS4, PSV | | | | | | | |
| 2017 | Earthlock: Festival of Magic | WiiU | | | | | | | |
| 2017 | The Elder Scrolls V: Skyrim | NS, PSVR | | Action RPG | | | | | |
| 2017 | ELEX | WIN, PS4, XBO | Original | Action RPG | Post-apocalyptic, Science Fiction | Piranha Bytes | THQ Nordic | DE | |
| 2017 | The Escapists 2 | WIN, PS4, XBO | | | | | | | |
| 2017 | Etrian Odyssey V: Beyond the Myth | 3DS | | Dungeon crawl | | | | | |
| 2017 | Ever Oasis | 3DS | Original | Action RPG | Fantasy | Grezzo | Nintendo | JP | |
| 2017 | Expeditions: Viking | WIN | Original | Tactical RPG | | Logic Artists | | DK | |
| 2017 | Fairy Fencer F Advent Dark Force | WIN | | | | | | | |
| 2017 | Fallen Legion: Flames of Rebellion | PSV | | | | | | | |
| 2017 | Fallen Legion: Sins of an Empire | PS4 | | | | | | | |
| 2017 (WW) | Final Fantasy XII: The Zodiac Age | PS4 | Remake | Turn-based | Fantasy | Square Enix | | JP | |
| 2017 | Final Fantasy XIV: Stormblood | WIN, OSX, PS4 | | MMORPG | | | | | |
| 2017 | Finding Paradise | WIN, OSX, LIN | | | | | | | |
| 2017 | Fire Emblem Echoes: Shadows of Valentia | 3DS | Remake | Tactical RPG | Fantasy | Intelligent Systems | Nintendo | JP | |
| 2017 | Fire Emblem Heroes | iOS, DROID | Original | Tactical RPG | Fantasy | Intelligent Systems, Nintendo Entertainment Planning & Development | Nintendo | JP | |
| 2017 | Fire Emblem Warriors | NS, 3DS | | | | | | | |
| 2017 | Galaxy of Pen & Paper | DROID, LIN, OSX, iOS, WIN | | | | | | | |
| 2017 | God Wars: Future Past | PS4, PSV | Original | Tactical RPG | | Kadokawa Corporation | Nippon Ichi Software, Kadokawa Corporation | JP | |
| 2017 | Golf Story | NS | | | | | | | |
| 2017 | Grimoire: Heralds of the Winged Exemplar | WIN | | Dungeon crawl | | Golden Era Games | | | |
| 2017 | Guild Wars 2: Path of Fire | WIN | | MMORPG | | | | | |
| 2017 | Hakoniwa Company Works | PS4 | | Tactical RPG, Open world | | Nippon Ichi Software | | | |
| 2017 | Hand of Fate 2 | WIN, OSX, LIN, PS4, XBO | | Action RPG | | | | | |
| 2017 | Horizon Zero Dawn | PS4 | Original | Action RPG, Open world | Sci-Fi, Post-apocalyptic | Guerrilla Games | Sony Interactive Entertainment | | |
| 2017 | I am Setsuna | NS | | | | | | | |
| 2017 | Ittle Dew 2+ | NS | | | | | | | |
| 2017 | Kingdom Hearts HD 1.5 Remix | PS4 | | Action RPG | | | | | |
| 2017 | Kingdom Hearts HD 2.5 Remix | PS4 | | Action RPG | | | | | |
| 2017 | Kingdom Hearts HD 2.8 Final Chapter Prologue | PS4 | Compilation | Action RPG | Fictional crossover | Square Enix | | | |
| 2017 | The Legend of Heroes: Trails in the Sky the 3rd | WIN | | | | | | | |
| 2017 (JP) | The Legend of Heroes: Trails of Cold Steel III | PS4 | | | | | | | |
| 2017 (JP) | Little Witch Academia: Chamber of Time | PS4 | | Action RPG | | | | | |
| 2017 | Lost Dimension | WIN | | Tactical RPG | | | | | |
| 2017 | Lost Sphear | PS4, WIN, NS | Original | | Steampunk, Fantasy | | Square Enix | JP | |
| 2017 | Mario & Luigi: Superstar Saga + Bowser's Minions | 3DS | | | | | | | |
| 2017 | Mario + Rabbids Kingdom Battle | NS | Original | Tactical RPG | Fictional crossover | Ubisoft Paris, Ubisoft Milan | Ubisoft | | |
| 2017 | Mary Skelter: Nightmares | PSV | | Dungeon crawl | | | | | |
| 2017 | Mass Effect: Andromeda | WIN, PS4, XBO | Original | Action RPG | Sci-Fi | BioWare | Electronic Arts | CA | |
| 2017 | Megadimension Neptunia VIIR | WIN, PS4 | Port | | Sci-Fi, Cyberpunk | Compile Heart, Silicon Studio | Idea Factory | | |
| 2017 | Middle-earth: Shadow of War | WIN, PS4, XBO | Original | Action RPG | | | | | |
| 2017 | Miitopia | 3DS | | | | | | | |
| 2017 (NA/EU) | Monster Hunter Stories | 3DS | Original | Turn-based, Monster tamer | Fantasy | Marvelous | Nintendo | JP | |
| 2017 | Monster Hunter XX | 3DS | Port | Action RPG | Fantasy | Capcom | | JP | |
| 2017 | Never Stop Sneakin' | NS | | Action RPG | | | | | |
| 2017 | Nier: Automata | PS4, WIN | Original | Action RPG | Sci-Fi, Cyberpunk, Post-apocalyptic | Platinum Games | Square Enix | | |
| 2017 | Nights of Azure | WIN | | Action RPG | | | | | |
| 2017 | Nights of Azure 2: Bride of the New Moon | WIN, NS, PS4 | | Action RPG | | | | | |
| 2017 | Nioh | PS4, WIN | | Action RPG | | Team Ninja | Sony Interactive Entertainment | | |
| 2017 | Omega Quintet | WIN | | | | | | | |
| 2017 | Operation Abyss: New Tokyo Legacy | WIN | | Dungeon crawl | | | | | |
| 2017 | Operation Babel: New Tokyo Legacy | WIN, PSV | | Dungeon crawl | | | | | |
| 2017 | Persona 5 | PS4, PS3 | | | | | | | |
| 2017 | Pillars of Eternity: Complete Edition | PS4, XBO | | | | | | | |
| 2017 | Pit People | WIN, XBO | | Action RPG | | The Behemoth | | US | |
| 2017 | Pokémon Ultra Sun and Ultra Moon | 3DS | | Monster tamer | | | | | |
| 2017 | Portal Knights | NS | | Action RPG | | | | | |
| 2017 | Pyre | WIN, PS4 | | Action RPG | | Supergiant Games | | US | |
| 2017 | Red Ash: The Indelible Legend | WIN | | Action RPG, Open world | | Comcept | | | |
| 2017 | Rogue Hearts | iOS, DROID | | | | Ninetail Games | | | |
| 2017 | Romancing SaGa 2 | WIN, NS, PS4, PSV, XBO | | | | | | | |
| 2017 (JP) | Seiken Densetsu Collection | NS | | Action RPG | | | | | |
| 2017 | Seven: The Days Long Gone | WIN | | | | | | | |
| 2017 | Shiness: The Lightning Kingdom | WIN, PS4, XBO | | Action RPG | | | Focus Home Interactive | FR | |
| 2017 | Skylanders: Imaginators | NS | | | | | | | |
| 2017 | South Park: The Fractured but Whole | WIN, PS4, XBO | | | Modern, Superhero, Parody | Ubisoft San Francisco | Ubisoft | | |
| 2017 | SpellForce 3 | WIN | | | | | | | |
| 2017 | Stardew Valley | NS | | | | | | | |
| 2017 | Stellar Overload | LIN, WIN, OSX | | Open world | | Cubical Drift | | | |
| 2017 | Story of Seasons: Trio of Towns | 3DS | | | | | | | |
| 2017 | Summon Night 6: Lost Borders | PS4, PSV | | Tactical RPG | | | | | |
| 2017 | The Surge | WIN, PS4, XBO | | Action RPG | | | | | |
| 2017 | Tales of Berseria | WIN, PS4 | | Action RPG | | | | | |
| 2017 | The Surge | WIN, PS4, XBO | | Action RPG | Sci-fi | Deck13 Interactive | Focus Home Interactive | | |
| 2017 | Tokyo Xanadu | PSV | | Action RPG | | | | | |
| 2017 | Tokyo Xanadu eX+ | WIN, PS4 | | Action RPG | | | | | |
| 2017 | Torment: Tides of Numenera | WIN, PS4, XBO | | | | inXile entertainment | Techland | | |
| 2017 | Toukiden 2 | WIN, PS4, PSV | | Action RPG | | | | | |
| 2017 | Undertale | PS4, PSV | | | | | | | |
| 2017 | Utawarerumono: Mask of Deception | PS4, PSV | | Tactical RPG | | | | | |
| 2017 (WW) | Valkyria Revolution | PS4,PSV, XBO | | Action RPG | Fantasy | Media.Vision | Sega Games, Deep Silver | JP | |
| 2017 | Vampyr | WIN, PS4, XBO | | Action RPG | Urban Fantasy, Historical | Dontnod Entertainment | Focus Home Interactive | | |
| 2017 | Vikings: Wolves of Midgard | WIN | | Action RPG | | Games Farm | | | |
| 2017 | West of Loathing | WIN, OSX, LIN | | | | | | | |
| 2017 | Xenoblade Chronicles 2 | NS | | Action RPG | | | | | |
| 2017 | Yo-Kai Watch 2: Psychic Specters | 3DS | | | | | | | |
| 2017 | Ys Origin | PS4, PSV | | Action RPG | | | | | |
| 2017 | Ys Seven | WIN | | Action RPG | | | | | |
| 2017 | Ys VIII: Lacrimosa of Dana | WIN, PS4, PSV | | Action RPG | | | | | |
| 2017 | Zwei: The Ilvard Insurrection | WIN | | Action RPG | | | | | |
