= Persona Q: Shadow of the Labyrinth =

2014 video game

- North American cover art, showing the casts of Persona 3 (right) and Persona 4 (left), and new characters Zen and Rei (center)
- Developer: P-Studio
- Publishers: JP/NA: Atlus; PAL: NIS America
- Director: Daisuke Kanada
- Producer: Katsura Hashino
- Designer: Naoya Maeda
- Programmer: Nobuyoshi Miwa
- Artist: Shigenori Soejima
- Writer: Azusa Kido
- Composers: Atsushi Kitajoh; Toshiki Konishi
- Series: Persona
- Platform: Nintendo 3DS
- Release: JP: June 5, 2014; NA: November 25, 2014; AU: November 26, 2014; EU: November 28, 2014
- Genres: Role-playing, dungeon crawler
- Mode: Single-player

Persona Q: Shadow of the Labyrinth (Note: Persona Q: Shadow of the Labyrinth (Japanese: ペルソナQ シャドウ オブ ザ ラビリンス, Hepburn: Perusona Kyū: Shadō Obu Za Rabirinsu)) is a 2014 role-playing video game developed and published by Atlus for the Nintendo 3DS. It is part of the Persona series, itself part of the larger Megami Tensei franchise. It was published across all territories in 2014: released in June in Japan, November in North America and Europe, and December in Australia. Atlus published the game in Japan and North America, while NIS America published it in PAL territories.

The story of Persona Q is a crossover between Persona 3 and Persona 4, whose characters are drawn from their respective periods by an unknown force and sent into a replica of Persona 4's Yasogami High School in another world. Meeting with Zen and Rei, two people whose memories were taken, the group must unite and explore four labyrinths in the school to recover treasures hidden within. These treasures can restore Zen and Rei's memories, which might help them find a way to escape. The gameplay fuses elements of the Persona and Etrian Odyssey series, and focuses on first-person dungeon crawling through labyrinths and combat using the characters' "Persona" abilities against hostiles known as Shadows.

Development on the game began after Atlus's success with collaborating with an external developer on the 2012 fighting game Persona 4 Arena. It was based on the wish to create a collaborative spin-off with the Etrian Odyssey development team and fan demands for a Persona game on the 3DS. The Persona Q development team was made up of staff from both Etrian Odyssey IV and the main Persona series. Series character designer Shigenori Soejima created the cast's new deformed "chibi" appearances, while the music was composed by Atsushi Kitajoh and Toshiki Konishi with supervision by series composer Shoji Meguro. First announced in 2013 alongside the console port of Persona 4 Arena Ultimax, Persona 4: Dancing All Night and Persona 5, it was the first Persona game to be developed for a Nintendo platform. It released to strong sales and positive reviews from critics, praising the game's comedic writing, presentation, music, and blend between Persona and Etrian Odyssey's gameplay styles. A sequel, Persona Q2: New Cinema Labyrinth, was released for the 3DS in Japan in November 2018 and worldwide in June 2019.

== Gameplay ==
The player controls characters from Persona 3 and Persona 4, and battles Shadows by using Personas.

Persona Q is a crossover video game, containing characters from Persona 3 (P3) and Persona 4 (P4). It focuses on dungeon crawling in a style similar to the Etrian Odyssey series, also created by developer P-Studio. Gameplay follows a group of characters as they navigate mazes, with turn-based battles forming on certain areas. The player picks characters from both Persona 3 and Persona 4 to include in their parties, which affects some dialogue and story events. The game comprises two main areas; a high school and labyrinths. At the high school, the player can heal their party, sell materials dropped by enemies in exchange for new equipment, and fuse "Personas" together. Personas are mythical beasts used for battling, and fusing turns them into more powerful versions.

In labyrinths, the player's party explores in first person through large, maze-like areas with flights of stairs connecting them, while fighting enemies and finding treasures. As the player moves within the labyrinths, the game displays the percentage of tiles the player has stepped on. Once this reaches 100 percent, a treasure chest appears on that floor. The player also creates the in-game map manually, drawing in the location of walls and adding icons representing landmarks, to make return trips easier. If a player does not want to map out the dungeons themselves, they can switch to an auto-mapping mode. The game features two types of enemies: Shadows, which appear randomly, and FOEs, more challenging enemies that move about on the field as the player moves. FOEs require the player to move in specific ways in order to avoid them, as they are often much stronger than the player's party.

When an enemy is encountered, the player battles against them using their Personas, which can attack enemies and heal allies. In addition to their main Personas, characters can also be equipped with sub-personas. By using skills that the enemies are weak against or scoring a critical hit, the characters enter a status known as "boost", which eliminates health and magic costs temporarily. Boosting multiple characters increases the likelihood of performing more powerful attacks or attacks combining multiple characters.

== Plot ==
The game's story is split into two separate campaigns for each of the Persona 3 and 4 teams, starting partway through the events of the previous games. Dialogue and events vary depending on the player's choice of protagonist. At Yasogami High School in Inaba, during the culture festival, a strange bell rings, trapping the main characters from Persona 4, known as the investigation team, inside a bizarre alternate version of the school. Meanwhile, the members of the main characters from Persona 3, known as SEES, are on a mission into the mysterious Tartarus fortress when they are transported to the Velvet Room elevator, which suddenly winds up at the alternate Yasogami as well. Upon arrival in the alternate dimension, the Velvet Room is warped into a strange and unstable configuration, with two doors that lead to different periods. The two groups discover a labyrinth below the school, where amnesiac students Zen and Rei need help restoring their memories of how they became trapped in the school. Along the way, SEES and the Investigation Team realize that they come from two different periods.

The students team up to find a way to escape, fighting "shadows" along the way, and eventually explore all four labyrinths, successfully unlocking the doors in the Velvet Room and restoring Zen's memories. He reveals that his true identity is the human avatar of Chronos, a manifestation of death, and Rei is a girl named Niko who died of illness twelve years prior. When Chronos came to escort her to the afterlife, he was intrigued by her descent into despair and nihilism as a result of having lived a meaningless life. Chronos created the alternate Yasogami High, split himself into Zen and a powerful being known as the Clockwork God, and sealed both of their memories in an attempt to bring Rei happiness. The Clockwork God is the one responsible for trapping SEES and the Investigation Team in the alternate Yasogami, hoping for them to traverse the labyrinths and recover Zen's memories so they can merge and become Chronos once again; this would result in the teams being erased from the time when their tasks were completed. The Clockwork God abducts Rei and transports her to the top of a clock tower outside the school. SEES and the Investigation Team decide to help Zen rescue Rei, and they ascend the tower and defeat the Clockwork God. After spending some carefree time together before the pocket dimension collapses, Zen and Rei vanish into the afterlife, while SEES and the Investigation Team promise to meet again someday and return home, although their memories of the incident are erased.

== Development ==
Persona Q began development in 2012 after the release of Persona 4 Arena, a fighting game co-developed by Atlus and Arc System Works. After their success, series producer Katsura Hashino wanted to create other collaborations. Hashino developed a new game concept based on fan requests for a Persona title on the Nintendo 3DS. The development team was made up of the main Persona development team and the Etrian Odyssey team, which had created the larger body of Atlus' work for the 3DS: the Etrian Odyssey team, led by director and former Persona team member Daisuke Kaneda, who had just finished development of Etrian Odyssey IV for the platform. Hashino wanted to continue the trend of creating unusual entries in the series, in addition to making Persona Q a "festive" collaboration between the two teams in honor of the series' 25th anniversary. The title Q was chosen to represent the developers' goal of originality. The main aim of the title was to create something for fans of the Persona series, which led to the addition of characters from two of the series's games.

The opening animation was directed by Tomohisa Taguchi, who also served as director for Persona 4: The Golden Animation. The scenario was written by Azusa Kido, who had been a writer for the Persona series since Persona 3. Azusa felt the challenge of creating a storyline that would combine the characters from both games, as well as fan pressure around the characters' popularity. She had to make sure that none of the characters ended up as bystanders in scenes, which was difficult for the more taciturn characters. While the respective protagonists of Persona 3 (the "Protagonist") and Persona 4 (dubbed Yu Narukami in additional media and later spin-offs) were blank slates representing the players, the later media expansions had given them set personalities which were reflected in Persona Q. Despite being a crossover between the two game's casts, the story of Persona Q is considered canon to the Persona timeline according to the developers.

According to Kaneda, the two teams found it difficult to combine Persona's combat and style with Etrian Odyssey's first-person exploration and dungeon mapping. The two teams were fiercely opposed to making compromises on either side. Initially, the developers were going to use the 3D dungeon design and battle system from the Persona series, but as development progressed, it shifted towards the viewpoint and battle system of Etrian Odyssey. An element carried directly from the Etrian Odyssey series was the FOEs, whose behavior patterns were designed to be unique to each labyrinth's floors and structures. Recognizable elements from the Persona series were included, such as exploitable weaknesses and group attacks. A Sub-Persona system, where characters could equip a secondary Persona, was based on the Etrian Odyssey series' subclass system. Some spells were a combination of elements from both Persona and Etrian Odyssey, while the "Boost" feature was an entirely new addition suggested by the staff. Persona Q was the first entry in the Persona series to appear on a Nintendo platform, which offered challenges to both teams. The gameplay systems were ultimately created so that people familiar with both series would find common appeal, and multiple comprehensive tutorials were added so players would not be confused by the new features.

=== Character design ===
Yukari's design in Persona 3 (left) and Persona Q (right). The characters were redesigned due to hardware limitations, with a focus on their defining traits.

The character designs were handled by Shigenori Soejima, who had been involved in the Persona series since its inception and was in charge of character designs since Persona 3. Soejima's biggest concern with the characters was that fans had expectations about their portrayal, but their standard designs would not fit either with the typical Etrian Odyssey artstyle or with the limited visuals and screen size of the 3DS. Because of these, the characters were redesigned in a deformed "chibi" style. When looking at how to scale the characters down, Soejima focused on what made each character stand out visually, then made that the new versions' key feature. To accomplish this, the team researched what fans felt was a character's defining trait, and many of the alterations were done based on feedback.

In addition to standard enemy designs carried over from the Persona series, unique enemies were created by Etrian Odyssey monster artist Shin Nagasawa. Zeus, a character referred to in Etrian Odyssey III: The Drowned City, made a cameo appearance as an optional boss and Persona. Zeus' Persona design was created by Etrian Odyssey character designer Yuji Himukai.

=== Music ===
The music of Persona Q was composed by Atsushi Kitajoh, composer for the Trauma Center series, and Toshiki Konishi, who had worked on the remakes of Persona 2: Innocent Sin and its sequel Eternal Punishment. Their work was supervised by Shoji Meguro, the main composer for the Persona series. Meguro also worked on the soundtrack, composing the opening theme "Maze of Life". While the gameplay and aesthetics were a cross between both Persona and Etrian Odyssey, the music stayed firmly within the traditions of the Persona series while still having unique elements: an example given by Meguro was a request by the staff for a track evocative of the occult.

The Persona 3 version of the game's normal battle theme, "Light the Fire Up in the Night", was one of the first tracks to be completed and influenced the general direction of the soundtrack. After the style was solidified, composing tracks went smoothly. A point of contrast with the main series was the dungeon themes: while the main Persona games had upbeat and frenetic tunes, Persona Q used gentler themes due to the more relaxed pace of exploration. A track that received a lot of effort from the sound staff was the ending theme "Changing Me", the lyrics of which were written by Kido based on the game's story and themes. Meguro worked with long-time Persona collaborator Lotus Juice, who created lyrics and vocals for several tracks, including the main boss battle theme, along with vocalists Yumi Kawamura and Shihoko Hirata. Multiple Meguro-composed tracks from Persona 3 and Persona 4 were remixed for use in Persona Q. Yuzo Koshiro, composer of the Etrian Odyssey series, wrote "Disturbances - The One Called from Beyond".

== Release ==
Persona Q was announced in 2013 alongside several other Persona titles: the mainline entry Persona 5, a spin-off title Persona 4: Dancing All Night, and the PlayStation 3 port of Persona 4 Arena Ultimax. The game was released in Japan on June 5, 2014. People who pre-ordered the game received a special soundtrack sampler CD. The CD features select original music from the game, in addition to special arrangements by the Atlus sound team that can only be heard on this CD. The full soundtrack was released on July 16. A manga adaptation illustrated by Akaume was produced for the Dengeki Maoh magazine from 2014. Two manga adaptations were released in 2015: a Persona 4 manga Side: P4 written by Mizunomoto, and a Persona 3 manga Side: P3 written by Sō Tobita. The first was featured in Kodansha's Monthly Shōnen Sirius magazine in January, and the second in Kodansha's Bessatsu Shōnen Magazine in February. Atlus had started to ask players to avoid spoilers with their game Catherine, which they did again for Persona Q.

In February 2014, Atlus announced that the game would see an English release in the second half of 2014. The localization was handled internally by Atlus, and followed their policy for the Persona series: they kept the text as close as possible to the Japanese original, except where some aspects such as humor would be difficult for a Western audience to understand. They also sought to avoid localization that would seem out of context with the visuals, citing the changes to the setting of the Ace Attorney games as a type of localization they wished to avoid. In Europe, the game was published by NIS America.

== Reception ==
Reception

Aggregate scores
Aggregator	Score
Metacritic	83/100
OpenCritic	89% recommend

Review scores
Publication	Score
Destructoid	8.5/10
Eurogamer	80%
Famitsu	35/40
Game Informer	9/10
GameSpot	80%
IGN	8.5/10
Polygon	9/10

Persona Q received positive feedback from critics with review aggregator website Metacritic indicating "generally favorable reviews" based on 56 critical opinions. Several critics liked how the game blended the gameplay styles of Persona and Etrian Odyssey. (Note: Destructoid:, Game Informer, IGN, and Polygon.) Meghan Sullivan writing for IGN praised the battle system from Odyssey, noting the strategy around party arrangement, the characters' additional Personas, and the leader skills. Megan Farokhmanesh at Polygon liked the map drawing system, calling it "fun, personal and rewarding". Kyle MacGregor of Destructoid also enjoyed drawing maps and making notes, but was critical of the labyrinths for the amount of time wasted when backtracking Sullivan also found this tedious at times, but overall enjoyed the exploration and puzzles. Game Informer's Kimberly Wallace said that some might find it tedious to draw maps, but still enjoyed finding the correct path through the labyrinths.

MacGregor praised the game's writing as more playful than past Persona titles. Wallace, Farokhmanesh and Sullivan also liked these interactions, but Sullivan criticized the game's focus on new characters Rei and Zen, as the game takes too long to explain their role. Farokhmanesh said that the characters were not as strong as those in the past Persona titles, but still liked them.

The presentation of the game was given praise by critics. Famitsu liked both the visuals and the sound. MacGregor called the music "stellar", and said that some of the new tracks were among his favorites in the series. Sullivan was impressed with the music, calling the mix of old and new songs "fantastic". Wallace enjoyed the sound, and thought that the updated character designs worked well in making the game stand out from previous Persona titles. She also liked how the labyrinths were given distinct themes, calling it an improvement over Etrian Odyssey.

The game won Slant Magazine's Game of the Year award, and Samantha Nelson of The A.V. Club listed it as one of her favorite games of 2014. Before the Japanese launch, Atlus noted that they expected shortages of units in stores. The game topped Japanese game charts following its release, selling 186,856 units. By August 2014, the game had sold 255,597 units, becoming the fortieth best-selling game in that period. Upon its release in North America, the game sold 40,000 units, which was noted as a high sales figure given the competition that month. A sequel to the game, Persona Q2: New Cinema Labyrinth, which added characters from Persona 5, was released for the 3DS in Japan in November 2018 and worldwide in June 2019.
