= Etrian Odyssey V =

2016 video game

Etrian Odyssey V: Beyond the Myth
- English-language cover art
- Developer: Atlus
- Publishers: JP: Atlus; NA: Atlus USA; PAL: Deep Silver
- Director: Shigeo Komori
- Producer: Shinjiro Takata
- Designer: Masaru Watanabe
- Programmer: Yoshihiro Komori
- Artists: Yuji Himukai; Shin Nagasawa; Hiroshi Sasazu
- Composer: Yuzo Koshiro
- Series: Etrian Odyssey
- Platform: Nintendo 3DS
- Release: JP: August 4, 2016; NA: October 17, 2017; PAL: November 3, 2017
- Genres: Role-playing, dungeon crawler
- Mode: Single-player

Etrian Odyssey V: Beyond the Myth (Note: Known in Japan as Sekaiju no Meikyū V: Nagaki Shinwa no Hate (世界樹の迷宮V 長き神話の果て, lit. Yggdrasil Labyrinth V: The End of a Long Myth)) is a dungeon crawler role-playing video game developed and published by Atlus for the Nintendo 3DS. The game was released in Japan in August 2016, in North America in October 2017, and in the PAL region the following month.

== Synopsis ==
=== Setting and characters ===
The game takes place on the continent of Arcania, which contains its own Yggdrasil Tree. According to legend, any wish will be granted upon reaching its top, resulting in a great deal of adventurers challenging its dungeons. While each of the land's four races have their own belief regarding what resides at the top of the tree, none have actually seen it for themselves. The city of Iorys, near the base of the tree, is where people become official adventurers, and gain permission to explore the labyrinth.

The continent's four races are Earthlains, or humans, Celestrians, who are similar to elves and are skilled with magic, Therians, kemonomimi with physical prowess, and Brounies, diminutive, dwarf-like people with significant medical, mercantile and botanist skills. While each class is normally exclusive to a certain race, through reclassing, any race can learn any class.

Earthlains believe that fame and renown will be achieved by conquering Yggdrasil. Celestrians believe incomparable knowledge will be granted. Therian legend states that they can obtain vast power, while Brounies believe in a hoard of riches.

=== Plot ===
The player, arriving in Iorys, meets Edgar, the heavily-armored Guildmaster, and assembles an adventuring party. They also meet Ramus, the Earthlain prince of Arcania, who gives orders from the city's Council Hall. Delving into the Labyrinth and exploring the First Stratum, Tutelary Forest, the player meets Lili, a female Celestrian necromancer with pink hair and pale blue skin. She is assisted by Solor, a scythe-wielding female Earthlain mercenary with purple hair and Gothic Lolita-style attire. The player eventually defeats an ancient Celestrian guardian golem blocking passage to the next Stratum.

After defeating the Hippogryph and entering the Third Stratum, Fetid Necropolis, Ramus expounds more on how it was tainted by an ancient ruler known as the Despot. Ramus orders the player to help Solor and Lili complete their mission on that stratum. Together, the player's party and the duo encounter the Undead King, a monstrous being that was formerly Lili's partner, Crow, until he stole the Ring of Undying. Felling the Undead King, the ring is retrieved.

Proceeding into the Fourth Stratum, a series of crystalline caves called the Lucent Hollows, the player's party begins to spot a mysterious girl wearing a brown cloak, with pale hair and grey skin. Defeating the Crystal Dragon at the end of the Stratum, the party discovers a space elevator that leads them to a new and unknown Stratum, the Untamed Garden. There, the strange girl reveals herself as Arken, saying that she created the entire labyrinth to contain the Eternal Tyrant, an ancient, evil being that once held complete control of a desolate Arcania. She also created the myths surrounding Yggdrasil in order to find adventurers strong enough to destroy the Tyrant.

After the Tyrant is defeated, Arken removes her cloak and reveals her true nature as a member of the Arken alien race, saying that she was tasked with watching over many worlds, including that on which Arcania resides. She fulfills her promise of a reward for climbing Yggdrasil by granting the party the treasures of the Therians and Brounies - the Yggdrasil Ring, a magic ring that grants high attack power to its wielder, and Yggdrasil Mithril, an extremely valuable silvery metal, noting the player has already achieved fame and wisdom, the desires of the Earthlains and Celestrians, on their own. She then decides to leave the planet, her task fulfilled, but asks the player to escort her to the next one she is to watch over, unlocking a post-game dungeon, the Empyreal Bridge.

== Development ==
Shigeo Komori returned as director of the game, after Daisuke Kaneda directed Etrian Odyssey IV. Komori had previously directed both Etrian Odyssey II and Etrian Odyssey III.

== Reception ==
Reception

Aggregate scores
Aggregator	Score
Metacritic	80/100
OpenCritic	72% recommend

Review scores
Publication	Score
Destructoid	7.5/10
Game Informer	7.5/10
GameSpot	8/10
Nintendo Life	9/10
Nintendo World Report	8/10
Polygon	8.5/10
RPGamer	4/5

Etrian Odyssey V was well received by critics, and was the eighth highest rated Nintendo 3DS game of 2017 on the review aggregator Metacritic.

The Academy of Interactive Arts & Sciences nominated Etrian Odyssey V for "Handheld Game of the Year" during the 21st Annual D.I.C.E. Awards.
