= Etrian Mystery Dungeon =

2015 video game

- Packaging artwork released for North America and Europe
- Developer: Spike Chunsoft
- Publishers: JP: Atlus; NA: Atlus USA; EU: NIS America
- Directors: Yukari Yokoro; Seiichiro Nagahata
- Producer: Shigeo Komori
- Artists: Kaoru Hasegawa; Shin Nagasawa; Nizo Yamamoto
- Writer: Shinya Ochiai
- Composer: Yuzo Koshiro
- Series: Etrian Odyssey; Mystery Dungeon
- Platform: Nintendo 3DS
- Release: JP: March 5, 2015; NA: April 7, 2015; EU: September 11, 2015
- Genre: Role-playing Dungeon crawler
- Mode: Single-player

Etrian Mystery Dungeon (Note: Known in Japan as Sekaiju to Fushigi no Dungeon (世界樹と不思議のダンジョン, Sekaiju to Fushigi no Danjon; lit. Yggdrasil and the Mystery Dungeon or The World Tree and the Wonderland Dungeon)) is a role-playing video game for the Nintendo 3DS. It was developed by Spike Chunsoft and Atlus, and published by Atlus in Japan on March 5, 2015 and Atlus USA in North America on April 7. It was published by NIS America in Europe on September 11. The game is a crossover between Atlus' Etrian Odyssey series and Spike Chunsoft's Mystery Dungeon series. A sequel, Etrian Mystery Dungeon 2, was released in Japan on August 31, 2017.

== Gameplay ==
The game features the character customization and character class system from the Etrian Odyssey series, and the dungeon crawling from the Mystery Dungeon series; the player's party, which is made up of custom-made characters, ventures into randomly generated multi-floor dungeons, with the objective to reach the end of each dungeon. Only the party leader is directly controlled by the player, while the other characters follow along, attacking enemies and providing support. The game is turn-based; each time the player performs an action, including moving one space on the map, attacking, or using an item, enemies will also move or attack. When the player's party is not engaged in combat, each turn the party makes will make the characters' health regenerate a little, but will also make their hunger go up.

There are various classes to choose from during character creation, which determine the characters' roles in the party: for instance, the Protector class has a high defense stat and is capable of attracting the attention from enemies who might otherwise attack the other characters, the Medic class is capable of healing or reviving wounded characters, and the Gunner class specializes in ranged attacks and is capable of "binding" enemies' body parts, thereby hindering them from moving or attacking.

If the player gets a game over, their party is sent back to the town outside the dungeons; additionally, the player loses all their in-game money and items. However, if the player has set up a defended fortress in the dungeon, they can attempt to lead the characters from the fortress to the fallen party, and attempt to rescue them.

Some enemies, referred to as D.O.E.s, are much stronger than normal enemies, and will attempt to escape the dungeon and attack the town outside. If they succeed, the player will get a game over, and certain facilities in the town will be destroyed and rendered unusable by the player for some time; it is up to the player to protect the town by fighting these enemies. When doing so, the player may set up various kinds of fortresses, some of which will buff the party's stats. These fortresses can either be left empty, or be defended by the player's characters. Even empty fortresses can be used as a way of protecting the town from D.O.E.s; if the D.O.E. manages to destroy a fortress, it will stop its attempt at reaching the town, and return to the bottom floor of the dungeon.

== Development ==
The game was developed by Spike Chunsoft and Atlus, the developers of the Mystery Dungeon and Etrian Odyssey series, respectively, with most of the actual development done at Spike Chunsoft, while Atlus acted as supervisors. The game was directed by Yukari Yokoro and Seiichiro Nagahata, and produced by Shigeo Komori. Background designs were handled by Nizo Yamamoto, while character design was split between Kaoru Hasegawa who designed the character classes, and Shin Nagasawa who designed the enemies; additionally, some character designs from previous Etrian Odyssey games, done by Yuji Himukai, were brought back for Etrian Mystery Dungeon.

During development, both the companies would continuously share their most recent data on a shared server, and discuss details of the game direction using an instant messaging program; additionally, they would hold weekly meetings during which they made various arrangements for the game, and every month during development, Spike Chunsoft would send their latest playable build to Atlus, who would check the direction the game was going in.

Character classes that were brought in from the two series had to be carefully considered in order to maintain game balance and to avoid overlap with other classes; for instance, the Gunner class was chosen to be the "ranged attacker" class of the game rather than the similar Survivalist class—a class introduced in the first Etrian Odyssey game—as the Survivalists in addition to their ranged attacks have several skills that assist with dungeon exploration, and thus would overlap with the abilities of the Wanderer class - a class based on the player character in the Mystery Dungeon: Shiren the Wanderer series. Another class that was considered for the "ranged attacker" role was the Arbalist—a class from Etrian Odyssey III: The Drowned City—but due to its high damage output it would have been very difficult to balance the game had it been included. Another factor in choosing the Gunner was that it already was a popular class in the Etrian Odyssey series, and had been made into figurines in Japan.

=== Localization ===
Atlus USA, the American subsidiary of Atlus, began work on an English localization of the game before development had finished, resulting in an English release only a month after the original Japanese release. According to an interview with Atlus USA localization editor Nich Maragos and PR manager John Hardin, this was "kind of a hassle" because of the risk of having to redo localization work as the developers make changes to the game, but ultimately worth it since they could release the game in English much sooner than had they waited for development to finish.

=== Music ===
The game's score was composed and arranged by Yuzo Koshiro, with Takeshi Yanagawa arranging an additional 10 tracks. In addition to new compositions, the soundtrack also includes arranged music from previous Etrian Odyssey games. An original soundtrack release, titled Sekaiju to Fushigi no Dungeon Original Sound Track, was published by 5pb. Records and released in Japan on April 22, 2015.

== Release ==
The game was released by Atlus on March 5, 2015, in Japan, and on April 7 in North America. The game was published in Europe by NIS America on September 11.

The first print of the Japanese release came bundled with a copy of an Etrian Mystery Dungeon themed issue of Marukatsu Super Famicom—a Japanese video game magazine that had not been in print since its final issue 23 years previously—titled Marukatsu Super Famicom 2015 Revival Edition, including 52 pages of information and artwork related to the game, as well as a soundtrack CD with six songs from the game. Similarly, the first print of the North American release came with a set of bonus items titled "The Sights and Sounds of Mystery", which includes a soundtrack CD with rearranged versions of six songs from the game; a 28-page book with artwork from the game as well as information intended to help the player with forming their party in the game; and a box that holds the game and the items.

Players of the North American version were able to get five pieces of downloadable content for free during the first month following the game's release. Since the end of that period, the content is available for purchase for players who did not download it during the first month.

== Reception ==
Reception

Aggregate score
Aggregator	Score
Metacritic	77 of 100

Review scores
Publication	Score
Destructoid	8 of 10
Electronic Gaming Monthly	7.5 of 10
Famitsu	8/10, 8/10, 9/10, 9/10
Game Informer	8 of 10
GameRevolution	4.5 of 5
GameSpot	7 of 10
Nintendo Life	8 of 10
VentureBeat	95 of 100
USGamer	4.5 of 5

The game has been mostly positively received, with an aggregate score of 77/100 on Metacritic.

Famitsu gave the game a score of 34/40 in their review, with the sub-scores 8, 8, 9, and 9.

=== Sales ===
Etrian Mystery Dungeon was the second highest selling video game in Japan during its opening week, with 65,226 copies sold and 91.96% of the initial shipment sold out.
