= Etrian Odyssey 2 Untold: The Fafnir Knight =

2014 video game

- Developer: Atlus
- Publishers: JP: Atlus; NA: Atlus USA; PAL: NIS America
- Director: Shigeo Komori
- Producer: Shinjiro Takata
- Designer: Masaru Watanabe
- Programmer: Yoshihiro Komori
- Artists: Yuji Himukai; Shin Nagasawa; Hiroshi Sasazu
- Writers: Shigeo Komori; Yoko Mito
- Composer: Yuzo Koshiro
- Series: Etrian Odyssey
- Platform: Nintendo 3DS
- Release: JP: November 27, 2014; NA: August 4, 2015; KOR: October 29, 2015; PAL: February 12, 2016
- Genres: Role-playing, Dungeon crawler
- Mode: Single-player

Etrian Odyssey 2 Untold: The Fafnir Knight (Note: Originally released in Japan as New Labyrinth of the World Tree 2 The Knight of Fafnir (新・世界樹の迷宮2 ファフニールの騎士, Shin Sekaiju no Meikyū 2 Fafuniiru no Kishi)) is a role-playing video game developed and published by Atlus for the Nintendo 3DS. It is part of the Etrian Odyssey series, and is a remake of Etrian Odyssey II: Heroes of Lagaard. It was released in Japan in November 2014, in North America in August 2015, and in the PAL region in February 2016.

== Plot ==
Arianna, the Princess of Caledonia, is heading to an unknown ruin, where she is to perform a ritual that takes place every century. She is to be escorted by the Protagonist and Flavio. As they venture into the first floor of Ginnungagap, they encounter Bertrand and Chloe, who were sent to investigate the ruins. The protagonist suddenly begins to experience a vision and is guided by a mysterious voice, awakening his transformation powers.

Progress in Ginnungagap is halted when they realize that a lowered bridge bars their progress. They learn from Bertrand that a member of the Guard is an expert on bridges, and head deeper into the Yggdrasil Labyrinth to find him. As it turns out, a power stone is needed to get the bridge to operate, and the only known source of one is the lair of the Chimaera. As the party slays the beast, the protagonist gets another vision as more of his power awakens.

With the power stone in hand, the bridge is repaired and fully functional. The party journeys deeper into Ginnungagap, defeating the Basilisk lurking in its first floor. However, their progress is barred until the protagonist gains more power by defeating another evil lurking in the Labyrinth - specifically, the Flame Demon. In the meantime, they encounter guild Esbat who discourage them from venturing further into the labyrinth.

After braving the second floor and Arachne the Spider Queen watching over it, the party meets with the Black Guardian, who tells them that the protagonist lacks the power needed to complete the ritual, and that another great evil in the Labyrinth must be defeated to continue. The party pushes deeper into the Labyrinth, clashing with guild Esbat and defeating Scylla that awaits at the end of the stratum. With this new power at hand, the party journeys to Ginnungagap B3F to complete the ritual.

After traversing the floor, the Black Guardian tells the protagonist that, as the Fafnir Knight, they are to leave behind the world they previously knew in order to succeed as the next Black Guardian. However, the party cannot bear to leave the protagonist alone and returns to Ginnungagap. Bertrand vanishes as an anomaly in the ritual occurs, forcing the party to stabilize the ritual and face off against Bertrand as the Demi-Fafnir. Due to the anomaly in the ritual, the system that empowered the lineage of Black Guardians, designed to seal The Calamity, has been compromised, and soon the Calamity will be unleashed upon the world once again. The party resolves to destroy the Calamity, and are told to seek the Ruler of the Heavens to get his aid.

The party maneuvers into the depths of the labyrinth, emerging at the top of the tree. There, the leader of the birdmen residing in the tree, Canaan, requests the cooperation of the party in defeating Harpuia, the Queen of the Skies, who has been terrorizing their home. With Harpuia's defeat, the birdmen grant the party passage to the floating castle above the tree.

As they enter the floating castle, the party speaks with the Overlord. He is impressed by their strength that got them this far, and pits them against one of his finest creations - the Juggernaut - to test it. With the Juggernaut's defeat, the Overlord has nothing but praise for them as he invites them to his throne at the top of the castle. They quickly discover that the Overlord intended to help them in destroying the Calamity by trying to kill and assimilate them, resulting in a fight for their lives. With the Overlord's defeat, he grants them the Elixir, and with that, the party ventures into the deepest floor of Ginnungagap to destroy the Calamity once and for all.

== Gameplay ==
There are two modes, Classic mode and the Story mode first introduced in Etrian Odyssey Untold: The Millennium Girl. Classic mode is the same as other entries, with custom characters and maps. Story mode has an expansive story with preset characters, cutscenes and voice acting, but the players will have to draw their own dungeon maps just like in Classic Mode. The game also contains three difficulty settings: Picnic, which allows for easy gameplay; Normal, which allows for moderately difficult but manageable gameplay; and Expert, which allows for the toughest gameplay possible.

== Characters ==
As with its predecessor Etrian Odyssey Untold: The Millennium Girl, Story Mode has five playable characters available to the player:

Fafnir Knight: The player's avatar, given a customized name by the player. A young man from the Midgard Library who is dispatched to High Lagaard to assist the daughter of the Duke of Caledonia in venturing through Ginnungagap.

Flavio: An adventurer and the best friend of the player's avatar. An energetically positive 18 year old young man who sometimes acts as a voice of reason within the group.

Arianna: The daughter of the Duke of Caledonia, a very ladylike but scatterbrained 18-year-old girl. She is escorted by the player's avatar and Flavio throughout Ginnungagap to complete her ritual.

Bertrand de Gervaise: First introduced in Ginnungagap. A knight of unknown age with a lazy personality, but can be serious and protective when needed. He tries to keep his past hidden from the player and group.

Chloe: First introduced in Ginnungagap, later explained to be a distant relative of Bertrand. An asocial 13-year-old girl who usually calls people by their job rather than their name and has an unnatural love of meat.

== Reception ==
Reception

Aggregate scores
| Aggregator | Score |
|---|---|
| Metacritic | 82/100 |
| OpenCritic | 79% recommend |

Review scores
| Publication | Score |
|---|---|
| Destructoid | 8/10 |
| Famitsu | 36/40 |
| Game Informer | 8/10 |
| GameRevolution | 4.5/5 |
| GameSpot | 7/10 |
| IGN | 7.3/10 |
| Nintendo Life | 9/10 |
| Nintendo World Report | 9/10 |
| Polygon | 8.5/10 |
| USgamer | 4.5/5 |

Critical reception for Etrian Odyssey 2 Untold: The Fafnir Knight has been positive. In Japan, Famitsu gave it a score of all four nines for a total of 36 out of 40.

Etrian Odyssey 2 Untold sold 59,531 copies in its first week of release in Japan.
