= Etrian Odyssey Nexus =

2018 video game

- Developer: Atlus
- Publisher: Atlus: PAL: Deep Silver
- Director: Shigeo Komori
- Producer: Shinjiro Takata
- Designer: Masaru Watanabe
- Programmer: Yoshihiro Komori
- Artists: Yuji Himukai; Shin Nagasawa; Hiroshi Sasazu
- Composer: Yuzo Koshiro
- Series: Etrian Odyssey
- Platform: Nintendo 3DS
- Release: JP: August 2, 2018; WW: February 5, 2019
- Genres: Role-playing, dungeon crawler
- Mode: Single-player

Etrian Odyssey Nexus (Note: Japanese: 世界樹の迷宮X, Hepburn: Sekaiju no Meikyū X) is a dungeon crawler role-playing video game published and developed by Atlus for the Nintendo 3DS and it is the sixth and final main installment to be released on the handheld console. It was released in Japan in August 2018, and worldwide in February 2019.

== Story ==
A royal decree from Princess Persephone of Lemuria summons explorers to the floating city of Maginia. From there, they travel through the Lemuria archipelago and investigate its Yggdrasil Tree in search of treasure.

== Gameplay ==
The game takes the interface and character stat system from Etrian Odyssey V. Magic attack and magic defense, rather than being universally governed by TEC, are now dictated by INT and WIS respectively. Stat caps are 255 instead of 99. Weapons can be forged to improve their stats and even unlock and improve stat bonuses or skills tied to them.

Character portraits can be freely selected regardless of the party member's class, and the game's default portraits on top of returning ones from V feature color customizability for the character's skin, hair, and eyes. The player can assign a voicebank to a character on creation.

The Force system and subclassing make a return for this game. Each class comes with their own Force Boost and Break, and past the midway point, subclassing becomes available, which allows a character to gain skills from another class. Skill progression is split into three pages: Novice skills are available immediately, Veteran only past level 20, Master past level 40. Skill caps and requirements are low to facilitate skill point management with subclassing.

Players can choose between four difficulty settings: Picnic, Basic, Expert, and Heroic. Picnic can be chosen at any time during a playthrough, but the moment that difficulty is selected, the player cannot switch out of it. Heroic is functionally identical to Expert, but can only be selected when initiating a new playthrough. Choosing Heroic prevents the player from switching down from it mid-playthrough, and also prevents carrying over past data if selected as a New Game+.

The game takes an adaptation of the overworld from IV to express its strata, as opposed to a single extensive dungeon that the player works through like the other mainline games. On exiting Maginia, the player is taken to a world map where they can select a dungeon to explore. Main dungeons usually last three floors, and from time to time with plot-based or NPC-related events, the player also unlocks sub-dungeons. Sub-dungeons are much shorter, only having a single floor, but are also home to an optional boss at the end.

After clearing main dungeons, the player unlocks a gather point where they can collect materials found within the related dungeon without needing to actually enter it. Materials can range from monster drops, gathered items, and even conditional or rare drops. However, occasionally an overworld FOE will show up, rendering the gather points it has visited temporarily inaccessible until it is defeated.

== Reception ==
Reception

Aggregate scores
Aggregator	Score
Metacritic	81/100
OpenCritic	94% recommend

Review scores
Publication	Score
Destructoid	8/10
Game Informer	8/10
GameSpot	8/10
Nintendo Life	9/10
Nintendo World Report	9/10
RPGamer	4/5
VentureBeat	86/100

Etrian Odyssey Nexus was received positively by critics with the game earning a "generally favorable" 81 and 82 from review aggregators Metacritic and OpenCritic respectively with 94% of critics recommending it according to the latter. Game Informer's Daniel Tack said that the core gameplay loop "is as satisfying as ever", but noted that the game as a whole "can feel uninspired with its recreations of the past". Heidi Kemps of GameSpot praised its character customization, dungeons, and storytelling, while criticizing its difficulty pacing.

=== Accolades ===
The game was nominated for "Game, Role Playing" at the NAVGTR Awards.
