= Investigate North =

Investigate North ApS
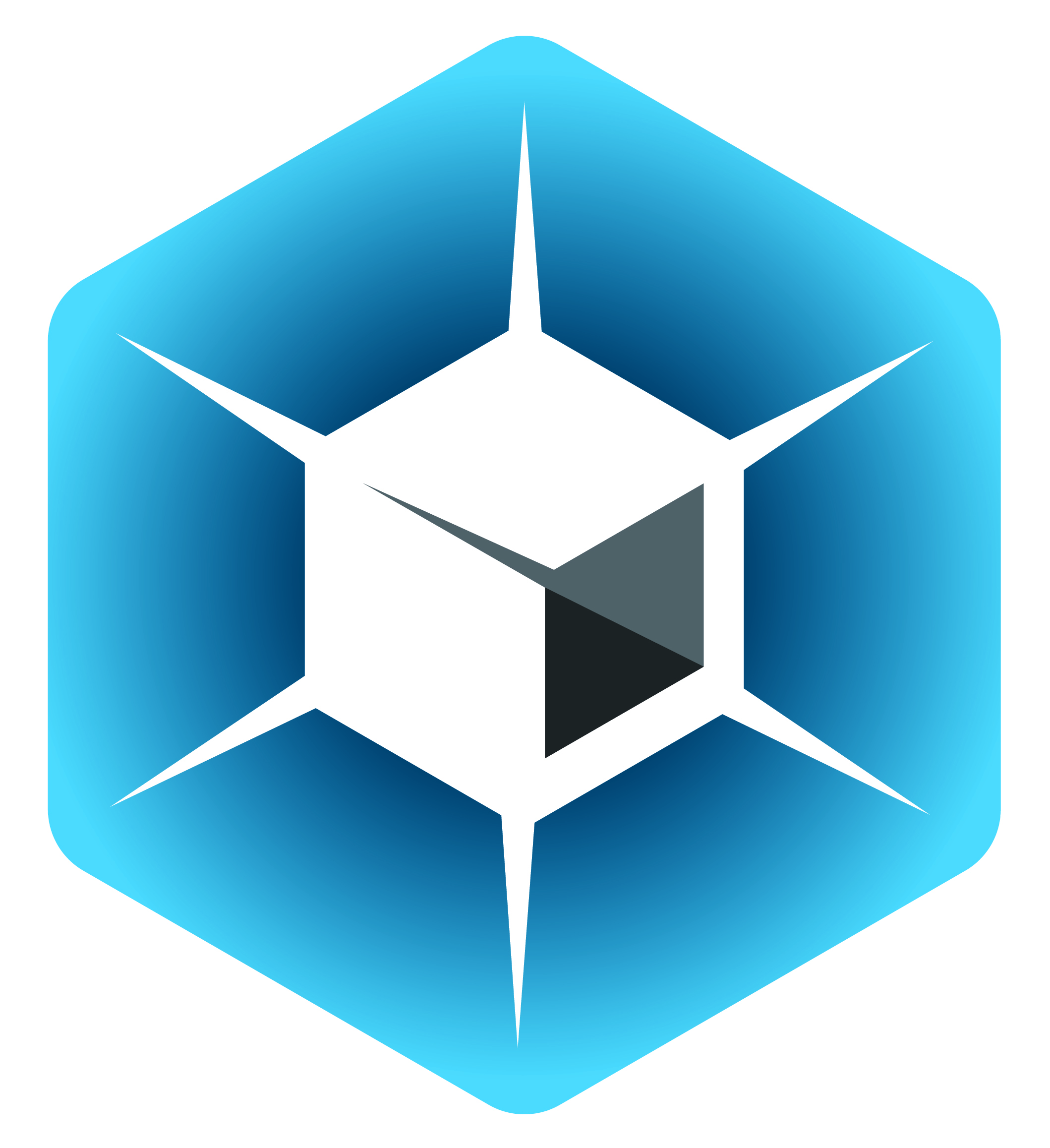
- Company type: Private
- Industry: Video games, TV/Movie production company, Video game development
- Founded: 2011; 15 years ago
- Headquarters: Copenhagen, Denmark
- Key people: Niels Wetterberg (CEO); Sebastian Bevenseee (Game Director); Ole Søndberg (Executive Producer); Vibeke Windeløv (Executive Producer); Aino Kann Rasmussen (Executive Producer)
- Products: List of Investigate North games
- Number of employees: 15
- Website: Official website

Investigate North is a content producer located in Copenhagen, Denmark founded in 2011 by Vibeke Windeløv and Stinna Lassen. They are known for the video game Cloud Chamber released August 7, 2014 for Steam. In 2017 they released their latest game called: Aporia: Beyond the Valley

[2]

== History ==
Investigate North was founded in 2011 by Vibeke Windeløv and Stinna Lassen.

On August 7, 2014 Investigate North released their first game Cloud Chamber.

In 2015 Investigate North acquired the independent game development studio Mystic Box Studio, the Aporia IP and at that time 6 key developers. The Investigate North game development team have since grown to 15 people and is in active development on the game Aporia: Beyond the Valley with a slated release date in the summer of 2017.

In 2016 Investigate North went into a partnership with publisher Green Man Gaming publishing Aporia: Beyond the Valley.

== Game development ==
As of 2017 the game Cloud Chamber has been released with two additional games under development by Investigate North; with Aporia: Beyond the Valley entering final development with an expected release in the summer of 2017. The video game Unpunished based on the TV-series of the same name is still in early prototype development with a to-be-announced release date.

=== Cloud Chamber ===
Cloud Chamber, starring Sara Hjort Ditlevsen as the young astrophysics scientist Kathleen Petersen and Jesper Christensen as her father Gustav Petersen. It is directed by Christian Fonnesbech based on a story written by Darren Mercado and Bo Plantin. Cloud Chamber is a live-action online mystery game that uses a combination of fragmented film, social media and game elements to work with other players to form theories to solve the main puzzle. As of 2017 the game has not been available on PC, the Steam store page being missing and no other source available. No Information is given as to the sudden disappearance of the game. The games Steam forum still exists, but the reviews and store page are wiped.

==== Reception and accolades ====
Cloud chamber received favorable reviews when it released in 2014. On Metacritic it has a score of 74 out of 100 based on reviews from 9 critics indicating "mixed or average reviews". Critics praised the novel story telling aspects while some negatively commenting on the actor performances and reliance on peer participation of its users.

=== Aporia: Beyond the Valley ===
Aporia: Beyond the Valley is an upcoming 1st person explorative adventure and mystery game developed using the game engine CryEngine by CryTek. The game is created by Sebastian Bevensee, Kasper Boisen, Mikael Olsen and producer Niels Wetterberg and is being published by Green Man Gaming. In Aporia you explore an ancient civilization told without using written text or dialogue. You complete the game by exploring and solving puzzles that guide you through the non-linear story of the game left behind by the ancient people that came before you. The games visuals are supported by an original musical score created by Troels Nygaard. The game was slated for release on Windows in the summer of 2017 with later release of the game on PlayStation 4 and Xbox One later in 2017.

Year	Title	Platform		
Year	Title	Win	PS4	XBO
2014	Cloud Chamber	No	No	No
2017	Aporia: Beyond the Valley	Yes	TBA	TBA

== Film & TV development ==
Investigate North is currently in the pre-production phase on the TV-series Unpunished created by Frederik Agetoft and Niels Wetterberg and executive produced by Ole Søndberg and Vibeke Windeløv. The Unpunished TV-show is based in a Nordic and European setting that mix science, technology, politics with artificial intelligence. The Unpunished TV-show is produced by the people behind the hit movie series, The Girl with the Dragon Tattoo.
