= Etrian Odyssey (video game) =

2007 video game

- North American cover art
- Developers: Atlus; Lancarse
- Publishers: JP: Atlus; NA: Atlus USA; PAL: Nintendo; WW: Sega (HD)
- Director: Kazuya Niinou
- Designer: Kazuya Niinou
- Programmer: Mitsuhiro Hoshino
- Artists: Yuji Himukai; Yukari Yokoro
- Writer: Shigeo Komori
- Composer: Yuzo Koshiro
- Series: Etrian Odyssey
- Engine: Unity (HD)
- Platforms: Nintendo DS; Nintendo Switch; Windows
- Release: Nintendo DS: JP: January 18, 2007; NA: May 15, 2007; EU: June 6, 2008; AU: August 14, 2008; Switch, Windows: WW: June 1, 2023
- Genres: Role-playing, dungeon crawler
- Mode: Single-player

Etrian Odyssey (Note: Released in Japan as Sekaiju no Meikyuu (世界樹の迷宮, Sekaiju no Meikyū; lit. Labyrinth of the World Tree)) is a 2007 3D dungeon crawler role-playing video game by Atlus for the Nintendo DS. It centers around first-person exploration of a mysterious dungeon known as the Yggdrasil Labyrinth using a player-created party of characters. The game received mixed to positive reviews from critics, who criticized its punishing difficulty as limiting its appeal, but also making its gameplay more rewarding.

A remake, titled Etrian Odyssey Untold: The Millennium Girl, was released for Nintendo 3DS in 2013. A remastered version of the original released for Nintendo Switch and Windows in June 2023 under the title Etrian Odyssey HD.

== Gameplay ==
The player talks to an NPC on the top screen; the map of one of the floors of the Labyrinth is shown on the bottom.

Etrian Odyssey has players explore and map a vast dungeon. Players navigate through the dungeon in fixed increments. Time passes only when an action is taken, causing movement, random encounters, and combat to all be entirely turn-based. The game uses a first-person view to present the dungeon using a combination of 3D computer graphics for environments and single-frame 2D sprites for enemies.

Etrian Odyssey requires that players maintain their own map by annotating (with the stylus) a small map displayed on the DS's touchscreen. The player is free to map accurately or haphazardly. However, the player cannot draw their own symbols, and must instead use the game's limited set of pre-designed symbols. The game also limits the number of symbols that can be used for each level map.

In addition to normal random encounters, the player must overcome "FOEs" (Field On Enemies), which are exceptionally powerful monsters which wander around the dungeon in much the same way as the player's party, advancing whenever the player does. The AI of FOEs varies, but most will wander the dungeon in a set circular path until they sense the player's party, after which they will move directly towards the party. If the player encounters an FOE in an area with multiple FOEs, it is possible for a second or even third FOE to join the battle if it reaches the party before they defeat the first one.

Like most early RPGs, Etrian Odyssey uses custom characters from a number of different character classes. While only five characters can be in the party at a single time, a much larger number can be created and kept in waiting back at the "guild hall". Characters can be switched in and out of the party when in town, so if a given specialty is needed for a specific obstacle, the party can be tailored appropriately. The player allocates skill points to specific skills during level advancement.

== Plot ==
The game starts with the player forming an adventuring guild in order to explore the mysterious Yggdrasil Labyrinth from the nearby town of Etria. This is encouraged by the Radha and its chieftain, Visil, due to the town's prosperity stemming from exploration of the labyrinth. He uses the experienced rōnin Ren and the hexer Tlachtga to teach the player how to explore the labyrinth and continue descending into each stratum.

Once the player nears the lowest stratum of the labyrinth, they encounter a humanoid race known as the Forest Folk. The Forest Folk attempt to prevent the player from descending further, citing an ancient pact, but the player finally prevails against their massive guardian bird, the Iwaopeln. Entering the lowest stratum, they discover the ruins of post-apocalyptic Shinjuku, revealing for the first time that the setting of the game is actually a far-future Earth.

At this point, the player is confronted by Ren and Tlachtga, but this time to kill the player. They claim that if the secrets of the labyrinth were discovered, explorers would stop coming to Etria and the town would no longer prosper. The player defeats the two, and confronts Visil deeper in the labyrinth. Visil, who was actually the immortal lead researcher who created the Yggdrasil Project to restore the planet, merges with the core of Yggdrasil, becoming the Etreant in order to protect Yggdrasil. The player defeats him, destroying Yggdrasil.

== Development ==
The title was first announced by Atlus through Famitsu after demonstrating it behind closed doors at E3 2006.

The development team within Atlus was led by Kazuya Niinou who also directed the development of Atlus' first in-house game for the DS, Trauma Center: Under the Knife. The game features character designs by Yuji Himukai, monster design by Shin Nagasawa, a story by Shigeo Komori, and FM-like music by Yuzo Koshiro.

The game was originally to be released internationally as Yggdrasil Labyrinth, but was renamed to avoid any possible confusion with Yggdra Union (a game published in North America by Atlus a year earlier) or Deep Labyrinth.

=== Remaster ===
During a Nintendo Direct event on February 8, 2023, Atlus announced that the game will be remastered in HD and released for Nintendo Switch and Windows on June 1, 2023. The remaster is available for purchase separately or alongside remasters of Etrian Odyssey II and Etrian Odyssey III in the Etrian Odyssey Origins Collection.

The remastered version is based on the Nintendo DS original instead of its 2013 remake, and includes updated visuals and music, quality of life changes, and additional character portraits. Portraits featuring Joker from Persona 5 and Ringo from Soul Hackers 2 were added as DLC.

== Reception ==
Reception

Aggregate score
| Aggregator | Score |
|---|---|
| Metacritic | 75/100 |

Review scores
| Publication | Score |
|---|---|
| 1Up.com | B+ |
| Electronic Gaming Monthly | 6/10 |
| Eurogamer | 7/10 |
| Famitsu | 32/40 |
| Game Informer | 6/10 |
| GamePro | 3/5 |
| GameSpot | 7.8/10 |
| GameZone | 7.1/10 |
| IGN | 7.4/10 |
| Nintendo Power | 7/10 |

Etrian Odyssey sold 32,511 copies in its first week of release in Japan.

Media Create/Famitsū reported that Etrian Odyssey had sold 119,584 copies in Japan as of July 1, 2007. Atlus' own July 2007 investors report listed US sales of the title at around 30,000 units, roughly 2 months after release.

Elsewhere, the game received "favorable" reviews according to video game review aggregator Metacritic. Although the title was recognized as accomplishing its goals (in terms of presenting a very classic RPG experience), it was noted that this greatly limits its appeal to a certain "hardcore" demographic. The IGN review noted, "[...] if you gave this game to ten players you may find one or two in the group that truly enjoy it". GamePro concurred, remarking: "Ultimately, this one is for fans of the genre and not for the short-on-time".

Most reviews noted that those who enjoy rigorous dungeon crawls or fondly recall similar titles from years past may greatly enjoy the game. 1UP.com summarized this sentiment by concluding "Etrian Odyssey will definitely appeal more to the OCD'd than the ADD'd, and its punishing difficulty and very deliberate pacing may turn off younger gamers who grew up on flashier roleplayers. But it offers a real sense of wonder and a sense of accomplishment -- feelings missing from far too many modern games". N-Europe awarded the game an 8/10 score, though the site criticised its lack of story and the fact that it is "too old school for some".

In a review of Etrian Odyssey in Black Gate, Josh Bycer said "Even though dungeon crawlers aren't as huge as they were back in the day, there is an audience looking for games like Etrian Odyssey and well designed RPG systems; which is what makes or breaks this kind of design. Balancing difficulty with design is never easy and it takes a skilled team to make that perilous journey worth taking."
