= Aporia: Beyond the Valley =

2017 video game

- Developer: Investigate North
- Publisher: Green Man Gaming
- Director: Sebastian Bevensee
- Producers: Niels Wetterberg; Ole Søndberg
- Engine: CryEngine
- Platform: Microsoft Windows
- Release: July 19, 2017
- Genres: Adventure, Puzzle Game
- Mode: Single-player

Aporia: Beyond the Valley is a single-player, first person, explorative and adventure game developed by the game development company Investigate North located in Copenhagen, Denmark. Aporia: Beyond the Valley is published by Green Man Gaming based in London, England, United Kingdom. It was released on July 19, 2017 through Steam, Green Man Gaming and Humble Bundle.

== Gameplay ==
Aporia: Beyond the Valley is an adventure puzzle game seen from a 1st person perspective. It has an emphasis on exploration and adventure. The player is tasked to complete the game by exploring a world filled with strange nature, ancient technology and puzzle elements.

== Plot ==
You awake after hundreds of years of sleep in the world of Ez’rat Qin - once a mighty civilisation, now a crumbled ruin. You roam the abandoned lands with no memory of your past. Your goal in the game is to investigate the world, discover your own identity and find out what happened to the world.

The world and story is experienced through paintings without text or dialogue with plenty of ambiguity, leaving you to devise your own interpretations.

Towards the end, in the "White afterworld", the murals describe the plot more clearly through the life and upbringing of Day/life (a girl) and Night/Death (a boy) who are fraternal twins. One mural can ironically be interpreted as the boy being scared of the darkness of the night.

The girl grows into a young woman and becomes the apprentice of a healer. The boy becomes a man and the apprentice as undertaker of the final rites. One will be sanctified, the other vilified.

The boy, now as an adult man, is the inventor of the Lamp and discoverer of the plant that grows only in the light of said lamp. The plant gives longevity and rejuvenate aging. Death is now a thing of the past. The Huntsman/warrior takes credit for both.

However the extraction of the powerjuice for the lamps turns out to poison their environment and ultimately themselves as aging and death starts to happen spontaneous and fast. The Huntsman/warrior blames night/death of this and has him chained and imprisoned in his underworld domain.

As night/death himself continually refuse to prolong his lifespan unlike everyone else, thus he grows old. Towards the end he refuse to neither construct more lamps, presumably the new blue-light "self charging" version nor be forced to rejuvenate. In a fit of rage, he is murdered by the Huntsman.

His deceased body is discovered by his sister Day/life and she performs final rites for him but the Dark fog Specter is born out of his body, presumably as a vengeful spirit to restore death as a natural part of life. He now travels as a specter surrounded as a black Fog to set things right.

Since extraction of the power juice continues to ensure rejuvenation of the population, the world slowly becomes uninhabitable. At the final stage, the population is put into Powerjuice hibernation until the world has cleared up. this is to be done by one of the Guardsmen of which the woman Day/life is one. some of the others have failed, one has died in his rejuvenation stone coffin and the Hunstman is not amongst of the chosen but, just as he took the credit of others work, now also will be awoken with the populace should day/life do that.

Because that is the final choice: The woman day/life can choose between letting everyone awaken despite knowing the Huntsman, the murderer of his brother will be awoken too. Now he will serve as the new leader and run the rebuilding of society or she can choose to let everyone rest, let the city remain as ruins and leave the known world by boat.

== Development ==
Aporia: Beyond the Valley is created using CryEngine. Initial development started as a student project at Aalborg University Copenhagen, Denmark.

In late 2015 the team joined the production and video game company Investigate North and development speed of the game ramped up.
