= Earthlock =

2016 video game

- Universal cover art with the original title
- Developer: Snowcastle Games
- Publisher: Soedesco
- Director: Bendik Stang
- Producer: Erik Hoftun
- Designer: Thomas French
- Programmers: Eivind Fjellvang Ljønes; Kenneth Backus
- Artists: Frits Olsen; Fredrik Dahl; Matthew Wells
- Writer: Magnus Aspli
- Composers: Eiko Ishiwata; Hiroki Kikuta
- Series: Earthlock
- Engine: Unity
- Platforms: Xbox One; Microsoft Windows; OS X Linux; PlayStation 4 Wii U Nintendo Switch
- Release: Xbox One: WW: September 1, 2016; Windows, OS X, Linux: WW: September 27, 2016; PlayStation 4: WW: January 27, 2017; Wii U: EU: September 7, 2017; NA: September 14, 2017; Nintendo Switch: WW: March 8, 2018
- Genre: Role-playing
- Mode: Single-player

Earthlock (formerly titled Earthlock: Festival of Magic) is a 2016 role-playing video game developed and published by the Norwegian company Snowcastle Games for Xbox One, Microsoft Windows, OS X, Linux, PlayStation 4, and Wii U. The Xbox One version was launched on September 1, 2016 worldwide. The Windows, OS X, and Linux versions, initially planned for release at the same time as the Xbox One release, were postponed to September 27, 2016. The game is planned to be the first volume of an Earthlock trilogy. The Wii U version was released on September 7, 2017 in Europe, and on September 14, 2017 in North America. A version for the Nintendo Switch was released on March 8, 2018. The game received mixed reviews from critics, who were heavily divided. Some called it a nostalgic throwback with memorable characters, while others panned its design as dated, and its art style, gameplay and/or story as bland or unoriginal.

== Gameplay ==
The player's party fighting a group of enemies

The game plays as a non-linear role-playing video game with turn based battles. In combat, characters fight in pairs - a "warrior" and a "protector". The warrior uses consumable items such as ammunition, while the protector can perform spells like healing and shields. When the characters are damaged by enemies, they accumulate support points, which can be used to activate other moves. Pairing different combinations of characters unlocks different moves and tactics, greatly affecting the flow of battle.

== Plot ==
The game's story takes place in the world of Umbra, where a cataclysmic event occurs that stops the planet from spinning. This leaves part of the world scorched by constant sunlight, part of it perpetually cold due to lack of sunlight, and a patch of livable land in between. The incident ends up burying much of the past advanced civilization, but humanity survives and society begins anew in the habitable part of the planet. The story follows the adventurer Amon, who, among his usual activities of scavenging ruins, gets entangled in a much larger conflict with the ruling Suvian Empire.

== Development ==
The game is inspired by early Square Japanese role-playing games, though Snowcastle wanted to subvert common genre character stereotypes. Development for the game started as early as 2011, with a pre-alpha build trailer being released in May 2013. The game was originally just known by its subtitle, Festival of Magic.

In November 2013, the game was placed on crowdfunding platform Kickstarter with the aim of securing $250,000 in funding. However, Snowcastle later pulled from the platform, due to it getting lost in the crowd during the holiday season. A fresh Kickstarter campaign was launched in March 2014 with a lowered goal of $150,000. This second campaign was successful, raising $178,000 in April 2014. The game's plot was written by comic book writer Magnus Aspli.

An early concept demo was released in March 2014 for the Windows, OS X and Linux platforms.

Snowcastle Games partnered with Cross Function to release the game in Japan. Despite waning interest in the Wii U in 2016 after the announcement of the Nintendo Switch, Snowcastle Games upheld their promise of a Wii U version, with an unnamed third-party handling porting duties. The Wii U version was ultimately released in September 2017 as a digital-only title. Due to the initial release's poor reception, it was announced in 2018 that a massively reworked version of the game, titled Earthlock, would launch that same year for Linux, macOS, Microsoft Windows, Nintendo Switch, PlayStation 4, Xbox One.

== Reception ==
Reception

Aggregate score
Aggregator	Score
Metacritic	(XONE) 66/100 (PS4) 56/100 (NS) (Earthlock) 73/100

Review scores
Publication	Score
Nintendo Life	8/10
Nintendo World Report	6/10
Push Square	6/10

Prior to its re-release, the game received an aggregate score of 56/100 for its PlayStation 4 version and 66/100 for its Xbox One version, indicating "mixed or average" reviews. Its post-revamp Nintendo Switch version received a higher, though still mixed score of 73/100.

== Legacy ==
The game received a more casual spin-off, Ikonei Island: An Earthlock Adventure, a single-player or co-op adventure and crafting game about exploring a mysterious island. It was initially released for PC on November 9, 2023, and, later, for PlayStation 4, PlayStation 5, Xbox One, and Xbox Series X/S, on March 21, 2024. A sequel, Earthlock 2, was also announced in 2020, and planned for release in 2022, although it was delayed several times. The sequel was re-revealed in 2024, with the plot revolving around exploring and bringing life back to the Desert of Kor using a special "Desert Ship". An additional game is reportedly planned due to a deal between Snowcastle Games and Jagex.
