= Etrian Odyssey Untold: The Millennium Girl =

2013 video game

- North American box art
- Developer: Atlus
- Publisher: Atlus: EU: NIS America
- Director: Shigeo Komori
- Producer: Shinjiro Takata
- Designer: Masaru Watanabe
- Programmer: Yoshihiro Komori
- Artists: Yuji Himukai; Shin Nagasawa; Hiroshi Sasazu
- Writers: Shigeo Komori; Yoko Mito
- Composer: Yuzo Koshiro
- Series: Etrian Odyssey
- Platform: Nintendo 3DS
- Release: JP: June 27, 2013; NA: October 1, 2013; KOR: February 27, 2014; EU: May 2, 2014
- Genres: Role-playing, Dungeon crawler
- Mode: Single-player

Etrian Odyssey Untold: The Millennium Girl (Note: Originally released in Japan as New Yggdrasil Labyrinth: Millennium Girl (新・世界樹の迷宮 ミレニアムの少女, Shin Sekaiju no Meikyū Mireniamu no Shōjo; lit. Labyrinth of New World Tree: Millennium Girl)) is a 2013 role-playing video game for the Nintendo 3DS by Atlus. It is part of the Etrian Odyssey series, and is both a "reimagining" and a remake of the first entry. It was released by Atlus in 2013 for Japan on June 27 and in North America on October 1 and released by NIS America in Europe on May 2, 2014. It was available via both Nintendo eShop and retail at release.

== Gameplay ==
The game was the first in the series to contain two modes, Classic and Story. Classic mode is the same as other entries, with custom characters and maps. The new Story mode is similar to other RPG series, with an expansive story, preset characters, cutscenes and voice acting, but the players will have to draw their own dungeon maps just like in Classic Mode. The game also contains three difficulty settings: Picnic, which allows for easy gameplay; Normal, which allows for moderately difficult but manageable gameplay; and Expert, which allows for the toughest gameplay possible.

== Plot ==
=== Characters ===
While Classic mode retains the character creation aspect of the game, Story mode adds five characters with unique classes and dialog. The player's avatar, the Highlander, is a young man dispatched to Etria to investigate the cause of earthquakes that have been troubling the town lately. The other characters in the player's party include:

- Frederica "Ricky" Irving: A mysterious 18-year-old girl the Highlander meets in the ruins of Gladsheim. In the beginning she has no memories due to being frozen for a thousand years in the past, but regains them later on.
- Simon Yorke: A 24-year-old researcher who works for the Midgard Library. He is a calm and pragmatic thinker who leads the Midgard Library's investigation team composed of himself, Arthur and Raquna, but not the guild when it is formed.
- Arthur Clarke: An orphaned 14-year-old boy who works for the Midgard Library. An energetic and mischievous youth who idolizes Simon and sees him as an older brother.
- Raquna Sheldon: A 20-year-old girl descended from the nobility of the distant city of Ontario. She has a hedonistic side, but is also honest and loyal. She was originally to be the leader of the Midgard Library's investigation team, but she refused the position.

=== Story ===
Unlike the original Etrian Odyssey, in which it was a late-game plot twist, the remake is far more upfront about its post-apocalyptic setting. Early on, the player and other party members rescue Frederica from suspended animation within an ancient, high-tech ruin, and she is able to wield a handgun in combat. Other aspects of the setting allude to its far-future nature, such as Raquna being Canadian.

== Reception ==
Reception

Aggregate score
| Aggregator | Score |
|---|---|
| Metacritic | 80/100 |

Review scores
| Publication | Score |
|---|---|
| Famitsu | 36/40 (9, 9, 9, 9) |
| Hardcore Gamer | 4.5/5 |
| IGN | 8.5/10 |
| Nintendo Life | 9/10 |
| Polygon | 6.0/10 |

Critical reception for Etrian Odyssey Untold: The Millennium Girl has been positive, with Famitsu giving the game an overall score of 36/40.

Etrian Odyssey Untold sold 90,297 copies in its first week of release in Japan. As of July 2013, the game has sold more than 114,000 copies worldwide.

The game's gameplay and story were generally well-received by critics, though aspects of its new characters were seen as stereotypical, such as Frederica's amnesia. Its single save slot was also criticized, as it did not allow the player to have one save for each mode. Untold was seen as easier by default than the original, with various quality-of-life features like an automap feature, being able to sprint, and an adjustable difficulty setting. The decrease in difficulty had mixed reactions; while many critics praised the additions, they were criticized by Kill Screen, saying they spoiled the intentional retro-style challenge the original had focused on.

The existence of a story itself was seen by some critics as unnecessary, given the original's purposeful lack of it. The added dialog was described as slowing down the game's pacing, and the preset characters decreased player freedom by preventing them from unlocking certain skills until later in the game.

In a review of Etrian Odyssey Untold in Black Gate, Josh Bycer said "Etrian Odyssey Untold does feel like the definitive edition of one of my favorite series in recent years."
