= Ittle Dew 2 =

2016 video game

- Developer: Ludosity
- Publishers: Ludosity; Nicalis (console releases, formerly)
- Engine: Unity
- Platforms: Microsoft Windows, PlayStation 4, Xbox One, Nintendo Switch, macOS, Linux
- Release: November 15, 2016: Windows, PS4, Xbox One; WW: November 15, 2016 Nintendo Switch; WW: November 14, 2017
- Genre: Action-adventure
- Mode: Single-player

Ittle Dew 2 is an action-adventure game developed by Swedish indie studio Ludosity and originally published by Nicalis, and the sequel to the 2013 title Ittle Dew. It was released for Microsoft Windows, PlayStation 4, and Xbox One on November 15, 2016. An updated version of the game titled Ittle Dew 2+ was released for the Nintendo Switch on November 14, 2017; the updated content was eventually released on the Windows version on May 26, 2019. The Switch is the only platform that received a physical release of the game.

The game was removed from all digital console platforms on September 20, 2019 by the publisher Nicalis due to a breakdown in relations with the developer. The Steam release remains available, as it was self-published. Eventually the game was re-released on the Nintendo Switch eShop on March 19, 2020 with Ludosity self-publishing the game.

== Plot ==
The main protagonist Ittle and her blithe buddy Tippsie find themselves stranded on an unfamiliar island after their raft breaks into pieces, and make it their goal to recover the pieces, repair the raft, and escape.

== Gameplay ==
The game plays in an overhead perspective reminiscent other action-adventure games such as The Legend of Zelda. Much like other games of its kind, it takes place in a large overworld for the player to explore. This overworld serves as a way to access and travel between smaller isolated areas referred to as dungeons, where the majority of gameplay takes place. The player fights enemies and solve puzzles to progress through these dungeons, and must defeat a dungeon boss to obtain the Raft Piece. There are eight Raft Pieces in total, and although there is a recommended order, the player is free to complete them in any order they choose. Supplementary to the main dungeons are caves which contain smaller individual puzzles or combat challenges, and can reward the player with collectibles or upgrade.

Just like the first game, items can be found in dungeons that assist in combat or puzzle-solving, some of which are necessary to progress. However, due to the open nature of the game, the dungeons are designed to be completed with only the item found inside and the weapon the player starts the game with. Similarly, every cave is able to be completed with no dungeon items or upgrades. Each dungeon item can be found more than once, and finding a duplicate will upgrade the player's existing item.

In addition to dungeon items, the player can find boxes of crayons that permanently increase their maximum health, collectible cards, and cosmetic outfits for the player character.

== Reception ==
Reception

Aggregate score
Aggregator	Score
Metacritic	PS4: 75/100; XONE: 72/100; NS: 77/100

According to review aggregator Metacritic, Ittle Dew 2 received a score of 75 out of 100 for the PlayStation 4 and 72 out of 100 for the Xbox One.

On Hardcore Gamer, the game received a 3.5 out of 5. The author, Jeremy Peeples, says that Ittle Dew 2 "isn't perfect, but does smooth out of some of the rough edges of its predecessor."

On The Indie Game Website, the game has a score of an 8 out of 10.
