= Aurion: Legacy of the Kori-Odan =

2016 video game

- Developer: Kiro'o Games
- Publishers: Kiro'o Games, Plug-In Digital (Steam)
- Director: Olivier Madiba
- Designer: Patrick Hervé Meli
- Programmer: Delphin Tcheckouloung
- Artist: Georges Pondy
- Composers: Yean Yves Bassangna, James Thorley
- Platform: Microsoft Windows
- Release: WW: April 14, 2016; (Steam)
- Genre: Action role-playing
- Mode: Single-player

Aurion: Legacy of the Kori-Odan (French: Aurion: L'Héritage des Kori-Odan) is an action role-playing video game developed by the Cameroonian developer Kiro'o Games. In September 2015 Kiro'o started a Kickstarter campaign to complete their game, which was successfully completed a month later. Aurion was released April 14, 2016, by Plug-In Digital via Steam.

The player controls Enzo Kori-Odan, the prince of Zama, who is betrayed by his fiancée Erine's brother. Based upon African mythology, the couple visit other countries to seek help defeating the usurper.

== Gameplay ==
Aurion is a single-player action role-playing game, in which the player controls main character Enzo Kori-Odan. The gameworld is a two dimensional setting, which the player can explore. Six surrounding continents must be visited to forge an alliance against his brother-in-law. Combat is in real-time, like a brawler. The game puts emphasis on making combos to defeat enemies. The player character Enzo can summon Aurion, an ancient energy, which can be used in Aurionic modes, allowing for powerful abilities. The player can unlock greater abilities and increase their power. The gameplay is inspired by Tales of Destiny, and has been compared to the gameplay of Dust: An Elysian Tail.

== Story ==
=== Setting ===
Aurion: Legacy of the Kori-Odan is set on the planet of Auriona, based upon the cultures of Africa. African music, fashion and myths are used as inspiration. Monsters from various myths are featured as enemies. The player controls main character Enzo Kori-Odan, who can use his ancestor's powers to help in combat.

=== Plot ===
The story follows Enzo Kori-Odan, a prince of the fictional land of Zama. He is the last heir to the Kori-Odan family, rulers of Zama. Moments before his coronation as King as well as marrying Erine Evou of Soma he is ambushed, overthrown and exiled from his palace in a coup led by his embittered brother-in-law. In order to regain his throne, the two embark on a quest seeking help from other countries and meet new cultures, to form an alliance to defeat Erine's brother, restore the throne, and save their kingdom.

Beyond retrieving their position, the dethroned Royal couple will precisely discover the geopolitical and existential dilemmas attached to their functions of King and Queen. They will have to find answers in order to secure the fate of Zama.

== Development ==
Aurion: Legacy of the Kori-Odan was developed by Kiro'o Games, a video game developer from Yaoundé, Cameroon, the first video game developer from Central Africa. Development on the game started in early 2014. Because of lack of video game development in Cameroon, Kiro'o Games' staff is self-taught.

While most fantasy role-playing games take inspiration from European history and mythology, Aurion is based upon African mythology. For the game's story, Kiro'o Games invented the Kiro'o Tales; a name that comes from Swahili, meaning "Spiritual Vision". Founder Olivier Madiba said that the fictional world of Auriona is based upon a fantasy view where Africa wasn't colonized, and while the story of Aurion is fantasy, it takes inspiration from real-world history. The different cultures in Aurion have suffered through a "horrible history" together. "In Aurion, with the story scenario, there's a symbolic analogy between the trials of Enzo and Erine and the common history of Africa and our place in the stakes of the world", said Madiba. The game takes inspiration from several African cultures; the announcement trailer was dubbed in the Bassa dialect, Enzo's battle gear is inspired by Maasai clothing, and the outfits of non-player characters are inspired by many people, like the Tuareg, the Yoruba, the Fula and others. The game focuses on working together, and Kiro'o Games wants to "unify and transmit African culture by combining myths, tales, and values" and hopes that African influences will inspire other creations.

=== Kickstarter campaign ===
To complete the game, Kiro'o Games started a crowdfunding campaign on Kickstarter on September 15, 2015, with an initial goal of €40,000. During the campaign, possible higher goals were also set. With €75,000 translations into Spanish and German would be made. Two video game industry veterans— Paul Bertone, former design director of Bungie, and Didier Chanfray, former art director of Adeline Software International —would be hired as consultants. Meeting the goal of €100,000 would make the game available for PlayStation 4.

The campaign was completed on October 20, with a total of €49,775. Despite not reaching the higher goal, Bertone was confirmed to be working with Kiro'o Games. Aurion was released on April 14, 2016, on Steam, which was published by French company Plug-In Digital.

== Reception ==
=== Pre-release reception ===
Destructoid's Joe Parlock thought that Aurion: Legacy of the Kori-Odan "looks fantastic". Kill Screen's Michelle Ehrhardt thought that Aurion is "a loveletter" to games and shows such as Guilty Gear and Dragon Ball Z and saying "Aurion asserts that Africa is just as capable of creating wonder and fantasy as any other culture (perhaps even more so)". Christ Priestman, also of Kill Screen, called the game "accessible" and spoke of its "global appeal".

=== Post-release reception ===
Reception

Review score
Publication	Score
Hardcore Gamer	3.5/5

Kyle LeClair of Hardcore Gamer gave the game a 3.5 out of 5 saying, " The end result is an African tale that should at least be commended for its ambition and desire to share such traditional fables with the rest of the world, along with its superb style and combat mechanics, but that also could have used more polish in delivering said fables while intertwining them with solid gameplay."
