= Etrian Odyssey IV =

2012 video game

Etrian Odyssey IV: Legends of the Titan
- North American boxart
- Developer: Atlus
- Publishers: JP: Atlus; NA: Atlus USA; PAL: NIS America
- Director: Daisuke Kanada
- Producer: Hitoshi Sadakata
- Programmers: Masayuki Higo; Yoshihiro Komori
- Artists: Yuji Himukai; Shin Nagasawa; Nizo Yamamoto; Yukari Yokoro
- Writers: Kenichi Takamori; Yoh Haduki
- Composer: Yuzo Koshiro
- Series: Etrian Odyssey
- Platform: Nintendo 3DS
- Release: JP: July 5, 2012; NA: February 26, 2013; EU: August 30, 2013; AU: September 12, 2013
- Genres: Role-playing, Dungeon crawler
- Mode: Single-player

Etrian Odyssey IV: Legends of the Titan (Note: Originally released as Sekaiju no Meikyū IV: Denshō no Kyojin (世界樹の迷宮IV 伝承の巨神, lit. Labyrinth of the World Tree IV: God of Tradition)) is a dungeon crawler role playing video game developed and published by Atlus for the Nintendo 3DS. It is the sequel to Etrian Odyssey III: The Drowned City and the first in the Etrian Odyssey series to be released on the Nintendo 3DS.

== Story ==
For centuries, the tree Yggdrasil has been a constant presence in the lives of the people of Tharsis. It looms on the horizon, visible from everywhere in the city. But its roots are in a far-off land where no one has ventured until the Outland Count of Tharsis sponsors an Explorers Guild to reach Yggdrasil and discover its secrets. The player is the latest explorer arriving in Tharsis on an adventure to seek their fame and fortune.

After venturing through numerous lands, the player discovers a sealed-off, fallen Empire with more advanced technology whose prince, Baldur, wishes to awaken the Titan, also known as Heavenbringer, the humanoid form of Yggdrasil. The tree itself, along with the other "servitor" races besides humans, were bioengineered by an ancient civilization to purify the land after an unknown calamity, but they perished before they could finish the project, causing it to eventually go berserk.

While Prince Baldur succeeds in awakening Heavenbringer from within the ancient capital beneath Yggdrasil, he is corrupted by it. After the player strikes down Baldur, they must fight the Titan via airship. After defeating the Titan, it turns back into a tree and does not release the world-threatening toxins it absorbed, saving Tharsis from annihilation.

An optional post-game dungeon is the Hall of Darkness, a facility in which ancient researchers attempted to develop a countermeasure to Yggdrasil should they lose control of it, but failed and created an even more powerful abomination that they were forced to seal away.

== Gameplay ==
The gameplay remains similar to the first three games, with some minor differences. There is now a new overworld in the form of the sky, which the player can roam around with using an airship, which gains the ability to fly at higher altitudes as the game progresses. The FOEs in the overworld are generally much stronger than those in the dungeons. Also, dragons periodically roam the overworld, and will instantly knock out the entire party if the player's airship comes within their attack range, usually, but not always, causing a game over. Also, enemies are now represented by moving 3D models rather than the static 2D sprites of the previous entries.

== Release ==
The game was officially announced during the Japanese Nintendo Direct on February 23, 2012. The price and the release date of July 5, 2012 were confirmed during the Direct, while the official blog and Twitter account was also unveiled on the same day. A downloadable demo of the game was released on the Japanese Nintendo eShop in June 22.

In Japan, the preorder bonus for the game included a soundtrack that comprises seven songs that are not used in the game. The soundtrack is known as Etrian Odyssey IV: Soundtrack Rough Sketch ver + Outtakes.

In November of the same year, Atlus USA confirmed that the game will be released in the United States on February 26, 2013. The launch edition of the game came with an art book and music CD. A downloadable demo of the game was released on the US Nintendo eShop on February 7.

In April 2013, NIS America acquired the publishing duties of the game for Europe and Australia. Similar to the other regions, a downloadable demo was provided before the launch of the game and the game was then released in both retail and digital format.

== Reception ==
Reception

Aggregate score
Aggregator	Score
Metacritic	84/100

Review scores
Publication	Score
Destructoid	9/10
Electronic Gaming Monthly	9/10
Famitsu	35/40
Game Informer	8/10
GameSpot	8/10
IGN	9/10
Joystiq	4/5
Nintendo Life	9/10
Nintendo World Report	9/10
Polygon	7.5/10
Anime News Network	A+
The Digital Fix	8/10

Critical reception of the game in Japan has been very positive, with Famitsu giving it a score of 35 out of 40 (9,9,9,8). Elsewhere, the game also received "favorable" reviews according to video game review aggregator Metacritic.

Etrian Odyssey IV sold 100,000 copies in its first week of release in Japan according to Media Create, giving it the highest opening sales in the Etrian Odyssey franchise series to date. By October 2012, it had sold 150,000 units and as of July 2013, is the best selling game in the series.
