= Etrian Odyssey II =

2008 video game

Etrian Odyssey II: Heroes of Lagaard
- North American cover art
- Developers: Atlus; Lancarse
- Publishers: JP: Atlus; NA: Atlus USA; WW: Sega (HD)
- Director: Shigeo Komori
- Programmer: Atsushi Motouchi
- Artist: Yuji Himukai
- Composer: Yuzo Koshiro
- Series: Etrian Odyssey
- Engine: Unity (HD)
- Platforms: Nintendo DS; Nintendo Switch; Windows
- Release: Nintendo DS: JP: February 21, 2008; NA: June 17, 2008; Switch, Windows: WW: June 1, 2023
- Genres: Role-playing, dungeon crawler
- Mode: Single-player

Etrian Odyssey II: Heroes of Lagaard (Note: Known in Japan as Sekaiju no Meikyū II: Shoō no Seihai (世界樹の迷宮II 諸王の聖杯, lit. Yggdrasil Labyrinth II: The Holy Grail of Kings)) is a 2008 dungeon crawler role-playing video game by Atlus for the Nintendo DS. Heroes of Lagaard is the sequel to Etrian Odyssey.

A remake, titled Etrian Odyssey 2 Untold: The Fafnir Knight, was released for Nintendo 3DS in 2014. A remastered version of the original was released for Nintendo Switch and Windows in June 2023 under the title Etrian Odyssey II HD.

== Story ==
Within the Grand Duchy of High Lagaard, a crisis has suddenly caused renewed interest in a floating castle which resides high in the clouds overhead. According to the available research, it can be reached by traversing a forested maze, the Yggdrasil Labyrinth, composed of many levels. In an effort to obtain the mythical "Grail of Kings" said to be kept in the floating palace, the Duke of High Lagaard is now recruiting adventurers in order to explore the labyrinth and discover exactly how to reach the castle. The player takes the role of the leader of one such guild of adventurers.

== Gameplay ==
Etrian Odyssey II requires players to slowly make their way up the trunk of a massive magical tree in order to reach a floating castle at the top while completing smaller quests along the way. The tree is represented by a series of vertically stacked levels which are explored one at a time with frequent return trips to town in order to rest and resupply.

In classic fashion, players navigate through the forest locales a single "step" at a time, moving and turning in fixed increments. Time passes only when an action is taken, causing movement, encounters, and combat to all be entirely turn-based. While randomly generated enemies cannot be spotted in advance, certain more powerful "FOEs" usually can be seen on the map and avoided if necessary, although "FOEs" still respawn every three game days. The game uses a first-person view to present the labyrinth using a combination of relatively simple 3D computer graphics for environments and single-frame 2D sprites for enemies.

Similar to early role-playing video games that did not support automatic mapping, players of Etrian Odyssey II must maintain their own maps. This is done by using the stylus to manually fashion maps on the DS touchscreen, with whatever level of detail is desired. Periodic warp points allow players to escape the labyrinth in order to save the game, so being able to successfully return to these (with the assistance of an accurate map) can be quite important. When compared to the mapping system in the original Etrian Odyssey, there are now additional symbols which can be used.

Featuring no pre-made characters, the title instead requires players to create their own from twelve different character types, each with at least one special skill or aptitude. While only five characters can be in the party at once, up to thirty can be created and kept in waiting back at the "guild hall". Characters can be switched in and out when in town, so if a given specialty is needed for a specific obstacle, the party can be tailored appropriately. The player further customizes characters by allocating skill points to specific skills during level advancement.

== Development ==
After his scenario work on the original Etrian Odyssey, Shigeo Komori took on the role of director for Etrian Odyssey II, replacing Kazuya Niino, who provided no input on the sequel. During an interview, Komori confirmed that it was indeed his goal to create a very "old-school style of game", intending to evoke feelings of nostalgia from gamers who played similar games in years prior. In a separate interview, Komori noted that while the game engine was re-used from Etrian Odyssey, the character classes and enemies were given completely new artwork, as were the dungeon "strata" (layers). Other enhancements which make the new title more convenient for players include being able to walk sideways in the labyrinth, displaying the characters' status inside stores, and being able to switch characters with the L and R Buttons.

Music for Heroes of Lagaard was provided by Yuzo Koshiro, who created the music on an NEC PC-88 before adapting it for the DS. Koshiro was left to his own devices in coming up with the score, using only descriptions of the game environments and scenes in doing so.

Etrian Odyssey II originally shipped with a number of gameplay bugs in Japan, but many of these were addressed for the North American release, where the developers were pleased to have additional time to improve the game.

=== Remaster ===
During a Nintendo Direct event on February 8, 2023, Atlus announced that the game will be remastered in HD and released for Nintendo Switch and Windows on June 1, 2023. The remaster is available for purchase separately or alongside remasters of the first Etrian Odyssey and Etrian Odyssey III in the Etrian Odyssey Origins Collection.

The remastered version is based on the Nintendo DS original instead of its 2014 remake, and includes updated visuals and music, quality of life changes, and additional character portraits. Portraits featuring Demi-Fiend from Shin Megami Tensei III: Nocturne and Teddie from Persona 4 were added as DLC.

== Reception ==
Reception

Aggregate score
Aggregator	Score
Metacritic	82/100

Review scores
Publication	Score
1Up.com	A−
Electronic Gaming Monthly	8.33/10
GameSpot	7.5/10
GamesRadar+	4/5
GamesTM	7/10
GameZone	8.8/10
IGN	8/10
Nintendo Power	8.5/10
Nintendo World Report	8.5/10
PALGN	8/10
Wired	8/10

Etrian Odyssey II received "favorable" reviews according to video game review aggregator Metacritic. As before, the gameplay was described as being primarily intended for the most hardcore fans of the genre, causing IGN to declare, "Etrian Odyssey is a tough as nails series, and only the hardest of hardcore RPG fans will get enjoyment out of it". Nonetheless, most reviewers felt that there was a worthwhile experience beneath the difficult and sometimes painful adventure; the GameSpot review explained: "It's rare to find a game that can sometimes feel like work yet still be enjoyable". 1UP.com concluded: "Sure, we're all dying to know what 'La-Li-Lu-Le-Lo' means -- myself included. But it says something about our hobby that even in a week when the biggest-budget, highest-tech game imaginable hits stores, there's a seemingly anachronistic, equally engrossing labor of love available from a minuscule, hardworking crew with just as much heart as [Hideo] Kojima's team. The gaming world's got more than enough room for both, and I couldn't be happier".

It was the 89th best-selling game in Japan in 2008, selling 145,421 copies.
