= Kiro'o Games =

Cameroonian video game developer

- Company type: Private
- Industry: Software, Programming, Game Design, Publishing
- Founder: Olivier Madiba
- Headquarters: Yaounde, Cameroon
- Key people: Madiba Olivier; Bassangna Jean-Yves; Meli Patrick Herve; Tchekoulong Delphin; Pondy Georges; Odira Ononye
- Products: Aurion: Legacy of the Kori-Odan
- Number of employees: Over 16 as of 2016
- Website: https://kirooworld.com/

Kiro'o Games, also known as Kiro'o Studios, is a privately held Cameroonian video game, animation, development and publishing company headquartered in Yaoundé, Cameroon.

== History ==
Kiro'o Games was founded in 2012 by Olivier Madiba. The name Kiro'o comes from the Swahili "kiroho maono", which means "spiritual vision". Since its inception, the company embarked on a mission to create a new genre of video games inspired by African myths and traditions (the first of its kind). The studio was launched by its holding company Madia, created by Olivier Madiba in 2007. Based in Cameroon, the studio faced many power shortages throughout its early development.

On 10 April 2015, Kiro'o Games announced the closing of its investment funds of €182,504. Kiro'o Games ran a successful Kickstarter campaign to fund Aurion, for €49,000, which was launched in September 2013. Between 2013 and 2018, the studio raised a total of $305,000 in crowdfunding, and launched a new crowdfunding campaign in 2019 through its own crowdfunding platform (Rebuntu). The lead investor of the 2019 crowdfunding campaign was Rebecca Enonchong. That amount has since more than doubled, with the company hitting 1 billion FCFA in equity crowdfunding in 2022. The Mboa Manager is a mobile game that simulates the typical environment of an African civil servant. The beta version is available since the end of 2020.

== Games ==
- Aurion: Legacy of the Kori-Odan (2016)
