= Tahira: Echoes of the Astral Empire =

2016 video game

- Developer: Whale Hammer Games
- Publisher: Whale Hammer Games
- Programmer: Tom Cox
- Artist: Peter Simpson
- Writers: Peter Castle; Adriana Cleaver
- Composer: Max LL
- Engine: Unity
- Platforms: Microsoft Windows; OS X Linux
- Release: August 31, 2016
- Genre: Tactical role-playing
- Mode: Single-player

Tahira: Echoes of the Astral Empire is a tactical role-playing video game developed by Australian indie game developer Whale Hammer Games. First announced as a Microsoft Windows, OS X and Linux title in November 2014, the game has been in development since mid-2013 by a team of three developers. Between February and March 2015, a successful Kickstarter campaign was created to help fund development. The game was also chosen to receive additional support from the government funding agency Screen ACT.

Set on a science fiction and fantasy world called Ma’abtik that is suffering a dark age after the collapse of spacefaring civilisation, the player assumes control of Princess Tahira and attempts to lead their people across the game’s world. The game features tactical role-playing mechanics that revolve around conversations and battles, the outcomes of which influence each other.

== Gameplay ==
Tahira is a single player turn-based tactics role-playing game. The game is built around turn-based tactics battles, which draw inspiration from games such as Fire Emblem and X-COM, in that the player controls a force of multiple characters with different abilities on an isometric grid.

The developers expressed the goal of creating a game that tied its story line and combat together to avoid a feeling of repetition in the combat. The Blizzard Entertainment game, StarCraft II: Wings of Liberty, was cited as an influence on the level design of the game’s combat levels.

As the player progresses through the story they encounter characters who will join their combat party. They have opportunities to walk around the game’s levels and while doing so, to talk to and learn the histories of the characters travelling with them.

== Plot and characters ==
The game takes place on the fantasy and science fiction world of Ma’abtik, a world which was plunged into a dark age after the collapse of the galaxy spanning Astral Empire. When a vast army that claims to be descended from the Empire appears and begins laying waste to everything in its path, a princess named Tahira finds herself in command of the remnants of her kingdom.

Part One will feature four playable heroes, with more to be added in the following games. These include Tahira, The Princess of Avestan and last Great Conduit. Baruti, The Lion of Avestan and the commander of Avestan’s knights. The Claw and The Hammer, a swaggering mercenary power couple from the ruined kingdom of Oran.

== Development and release ==
Tahira features rotoscoped animations for all of its combat characters, a decision the team attributed to the influence of Stoic Studio’s The Banner Saga.

The setting of Tahira was pitched by the game's writer Peter Castle as being inspired by his travels through Turkey, Syria, Jordan, Israel, Nepal and India. He later went on to cite the ongoing Syrian Civil War as having had a strong effect on him as he wrote the story of Tahira. When describing the game’s other influences, Castle cited the works of Hayao Miyazaki (in particular Nausicaa of the Valley of the Wind), Avatar: The Last Airbender, The Serpentwar Saga by Raymond E Feist and the Earthsea series by Ursula Le Guin.

Tahira: Echoes of the Astral Empire was announced in November 2014 as the debut title from Australian independent game developer Whale Hammer Games. The development team comprised three full-time developers, Peter Castle, Peter Simpson and Tom Cox as well as two audio contractors. Castle stated his inspiration for the game was to create “a game that captures the excitement and adventure of going on a journey, but one that also reflects on some of the harsher realities of life in an honest and interesting way.”

In December 2013, Whale Hammer Games received funding assistance from the state government of Canberra, which was used to hire a sound designer, composer and recording studio.

On February 18, 2015, the team launched a Kickstarter campaign with a target of $68,000 AUD to help fund development. A tentative release date of January 2016 was set. On March 20 the Kickstarter campaign concluded successfully having raised $68,756 AUD from 1,283 backers.

== Soundtrack ==
The game's score would be written by Max LL, the composer of the soundtrack of "Jotun". The soundtrack was released for sale on Bandcamp, Steam and GOG.com on August 31, 2016 alongside the main game. Max cited his experiences travelling through Central Asia and Iran as a major influence on his work. He also expressed his hope that players would relate to Tahira's emotional journey (in part referring to her experience as a refugee) as they played through the game.

== Reception ==
Reception

Aggregate score
Aggregator	Score
GameRankings	66%

Review score
Publication	Score
Destructoid	6.5/10

Reviews had generally been mixed, with the game currently holding an average score of 66% on GameRankings. Destructoid was less than positive giving it a 6.5 out of 10, saying "I'm so torn on Tahira: Echoes of the Astral Empire. It's easily one of the most mechanically sound entries into the genre I have played in quite some time, but it barely lets the players experiment with its mechanics." The review mentions that the dialogue is cringe-worthy at times, but that it feels more like it was an aspect of characterisation rather than shoddy writing. It goes on to say that the story does a good job of keeping the player's interest throughout the eight to ten-hour adventure.

The game was nominated for a number of awards after release including for 'Representation' at the Australian Game Developer Awards and 'Best New IP of 2016' at the DDNet Awards.
