= Green Man Gaming =

Online video game retailer

Green Man Gaming Limited
- Company type: Private limited company
- Website type: E-commerce
- Available in: English
- Founded: 2009; 17 years ago
- Headquarters: London, United Kingdom
- Key people: Paul Sulyok (CEO and founder)
- Industry: Video game industry
- Website: www.greenmangaming.com
- Launched: 10 May 2010; 16 years ago
- Current status: Active

Green Man Gaming is a British online video game retailer, distributor, and publisher. It has gained 4.7 million users since its release in the year 2010. Green Man Gaming works with companies like Steam, Uplay, Origin, and the Epic Games Store to sell in-game keys at retail and discounted prices which can be redeemed by customers on respective platforms.

== History ==
Green Man Gaming was founded in 2009 by Paul Sulyok and Lee Packham and officially launched on 10 May 2010. The platform initially included a digital rights management system called Capsule, which allowed users to trade eligible digital games for store credit. The system was later discontinued in 2016.

In July 2012, Green Man Gaming acquired the gaming social network Playfire. At the time of acquisition, Playfire had more than 1 million users and provided gameplay tracking and achievement features across multiple platforms.

In September 2014, the company launched its publishing division, Green Man Loaded, later renamed Green Man Gaming Publishing.

In 2018, Green Man Gaming announced plans to pursue an initial public offering on AIM market, a market of the London Stock Exchange, at a reported valuation of approximately £100 million. The listing was later postponed and the company remained privately held.

In 2019, Green Man Gaming became a founding member of the Playing for the Planet Alliance, a United Nations-supported initiative focused on environmental sustainability in the video game industry.

== Published games ==
Year	Title	Developer	Genre(s)	Platform
2015	Black & White Bushido	Good Catch Games	Action / Multiplayer	Microsoft Windows / OS X
2015	Quell	Fallen Tree Games	Puzzle	Microsoft Windows
2015	Quell Memento	Fallen Tree Games	Puzzle	Microsoft Windows
2015	Quell Reflect	Fallen Tree Games	Puzzle	Microsoft Windows
2015	Idol Hands	Pocket Games	Strategy	Microsoft Windows / OS X / Linux
2015	Keebles	Burnt Fuse	Action / Physics	Microsoft Windows / OS X
2015	Switch Galaxy Ultra	Atomicom Limited	Racing	Microsoft Windows / OS X / linux
2015	Eternal Step	Once More With Gusto	Action / Adventure	Microsoft Windows / OS X / Linux
2016	Square's Route	Black Death Apps Limited	Puzzle	Microsoft Windows / OS X
2016	Glitchrunners	Torque Studios	Action / Multiplayer	Microsoft Windows / OS X
2016	The Black Death	Syrin Studios	Survival	Microsoft Windows
2017	Aporia: Beyond The Valley	Investigate North	Adventure / Puzzle	Microsoft Windows
2017	Peregrin	Domino Digital Limited	Adventure / Puzzle	Microsoft Windows / OS X
2017	War Tech fighters	Drakkar Dev	Action / Mech	Microsoft Windows
2018	Stable Orbit	Codalyn	Simulation	Microsoft Windows / OS X / Linux
2018	Stormworks: Build And Rescue	Sunfire Software	Sandbox / Building	Microsoft Windows / OS X
2019	ShockRods	Stainless Games	Action / Multiplayer	Microsoft Windows
2019	Pride Run	IV Productions	Rhythm action	Microsoft Windows / OS X
2019	Skybolt Zack	DEVS MUST DIE	Rhythm action / Platformer	Microsoft Windows / Nintendo Switch
2020	Aeronautica Imperialis: Flight Command	Binary Planets	Strategy	Microsoft Windows
2020	Lovingly Evil	Lizard Hazard Games	Dating Sim	Microsoft Windows / OS X / Linux
2020	Re:Turn - One Way Trip	Red Ego Games	Adventure / Puzzle	Microsoft Windows / Nintendo Switch / PlayStation 4 / Xbox One
2020	Dustoff Z	Invictus Games Ltd.	Action	Microsoft Windows
2020	Ponpu	Purple Tree Studio	Action	Microsoft Windows
2021	Sea of Craft	Wizard Games	Adventure / construction	Microsoft Windows
2022	The Galactic Junkers	Evil Twin Artworks	Action-adventure	Microsoft Windows / Nintendo Switch / PlayStation 4 / Xbox One

== Controversy ==
In 2015, Green Man Gaming was accused of selling unauthorized keys on their store. They denied this, responding that the majority of keys come directly from publishers, with the occasional need to offer keys for games from publishers that are unable to provide them directly due to commercial restrictions.

Following this, in November 2015, the company placed information on each game's store page on their site to identify the source of the redemption keys, either through Green Man Gaming, which comes directly from the publisher, or through an authorized third-party reseller.
