= Etrian Odyssey III =

2010 video game

Etrian Odyssey III: The Drowned City
- North American boxart
- Developer: Atlus
- Publishers: JP: Atlus; NA: Atlus USA; WW: Sega (HD)
- Director: Shigeo Komori
- Programmer: Yoshihiro Komori
- Artist: Yuji Himukai
- Composer: Yuzo Koshiro
- Series: Etrian Odyssey
- Engine: Unity (HD)
- Platforms: Nintendo DS; Nintendo Switch; Windows
- Release: Nintendo DS: JP: April 1, 2010; NA: September 21, 2010; Switch, Windows: WW: June 1, 2023
- Genres: Role-playing, dungeon crawler
- Modes: Single-player, multiplayer

Etrian Odyssey III: The Drowned City (Note: Originally released in Japan as Sekaiju no Meikyū III: Seikai no Raihōsha (世界樹の迷宮III 星海の来訪者, lit. Yggdrasil Labyrinth III: Visitor at the Sea of Stars)) is a 2010 3D dungeon crawler role-playing video game by Atlus for the Nintendo DS. It is a sequel to Etrian Odyssey II: Heroes of Lagaard. Players assume the role of a guild leader, adventuring into the labyrinth to fulfill quests.

A remastered version was released for Nintendo Switch and Windows in June 2023 under the title Etrian Odyssey III HD.

== Gameplay ==
This game follows in the footsteps of its predecessors with one screen showing a 3D view of the Wizardry-style dungeon, while the other one shows an overhead display of the map that players must maintain.

Like its predecessors, the game only partially maps the terrain. Players make use of a mapping system which lets them freely place icons on a gridded map. These navigation icons can represent sea currents, landmarks, and footnotes of the terrain that players encountered.

In Etrian Odyssey III, there are no pre-made playable characters. Players have to build their own guild by creating characters from a number of different character types (classes). Each class has its own skills and statistics, as well as limits on what equipment the character can wear. Although no more than five characters can be in the player's active party at the same time, up to 30 characters can be added to a guild, and players can switch out characters in town.

This third game in the series provides 12 all-new classes, as well as the ability to subclass (gaining most of the second class' skill set) with the exception of an unlockable class, the Yggdroid, which cannot be subclassed but can learn sub classes.

Another addition was the option to "set sail" on a ship that the players are able to get after the first mission is completed. The voyages depend on the amount of provisions that the player has at the moment, restricting the movement only for the amount of spaces that the provisions allow them to advance. While at sea, the mapping system is the same as on the labyrinth, only with the addition of new navigation icons exclusive for sea mapping (e.g. whirlpools and islands). However, while sailing, there are no random encounters and no monsters except for pirate ships roaming the same ways as F.O.E.s on the labyrinth which, on contact, will sink the player's ship. Mission assignments for the player while on the sea will be to locate and reach foreign ports in order to restore Armoroad's trading roads. Once a foreign port has been reached, a sea quest option will be available. The sea quest option will be to get rid of certain unique monsters that can only be found in that specific area, meaning that in order to complete the monster discovery book, the sea quest is mandatory.

Another addition not seen in the first two games is customizing weapons through forging. Forging is the act of including an effect in the weapon of player's choice as long as the needed materials have been provided beforehand and the weapon has enough "sockets" or blank spaces to place the corresponding forge, along with the required money to pay for it. In order for this to be available, different "hammers" with the desired effects need to be found either through quest or in chest located all over the labyrinth.

== Plot ==
The game is set in a sea city known as Armoroad, which is surrounded by the beautiful ocean. Armoroad prospered in the ancient time with high-level civilization. However, because of the great earthquake that happened a hundred years ago, the central part of the city sank down into the bottom of the sea, along with its superior technology.

After the "Great Disaster", a labyrinth appeared in the hole of the city created by the earthquake. People from all over the world gathered around Armoroad to find clues that will lead them to the vanished city. Adventurers embarked down into the enormous hole, which devoured most part of the city and the lost technology. Some sought for the truth behind the "Great Disaster", while the others sought the treasures buried deepest under the sea.

== Development ==
Shigeo Komori, the director of Etrian Odyssey II and III, told the reasons of adding the "sea" element to the new entry of the series during an interview. Komori said that the image of Etrian Odyssey was a green sea of trees and that of Etrian Odyssey II was the chill sky of North Europe. When he came to think about the theme for the third title, he felt really attracted by the warm southern sea.

=== Remaster ===
During a Nintendo Direct event on February 8, 2023, Atlus announced that the game will be remastered in HD and released for Nintendo Switch and Windows on June 1, 2023. The remaster is available for purchase separately or alongside remasters of the first Etrian Odyssey and Etrian Odyssey II in the Etrian Odyssey Origins Collection.

The remastered version includes updated visuals and music, quality of life changes, and additional character portraits. Portraits featuring Nahobino from Shin Megami Tensei V and Aigis from Persona 3 were added as DLC.

== Reception ==
Reception

Aggregate score
Aggregator	Score
Metacritic	77/100

Review scores
Publication	Score
1Up.com	A−
Destructoid	8/10
Famitsu	35/40
GamePro	4/5 stars
GameSpot	7/10
GamesTM	9/10
GameZone	7.5/10
IGN	6/10
Nintendo Power	8.5/10
Nintendo World Report	8/10
The A.V. Club	B

The game received "generally favorable reviews" according to video game review aggregator Metacritic. Famitsu gave it three nines and one eight, for a total of 35 out of 40; they said that "the core charm of the series, with its Wizardry-style gameplay and player-built maps, is as strong as ever".
