= Takashi =

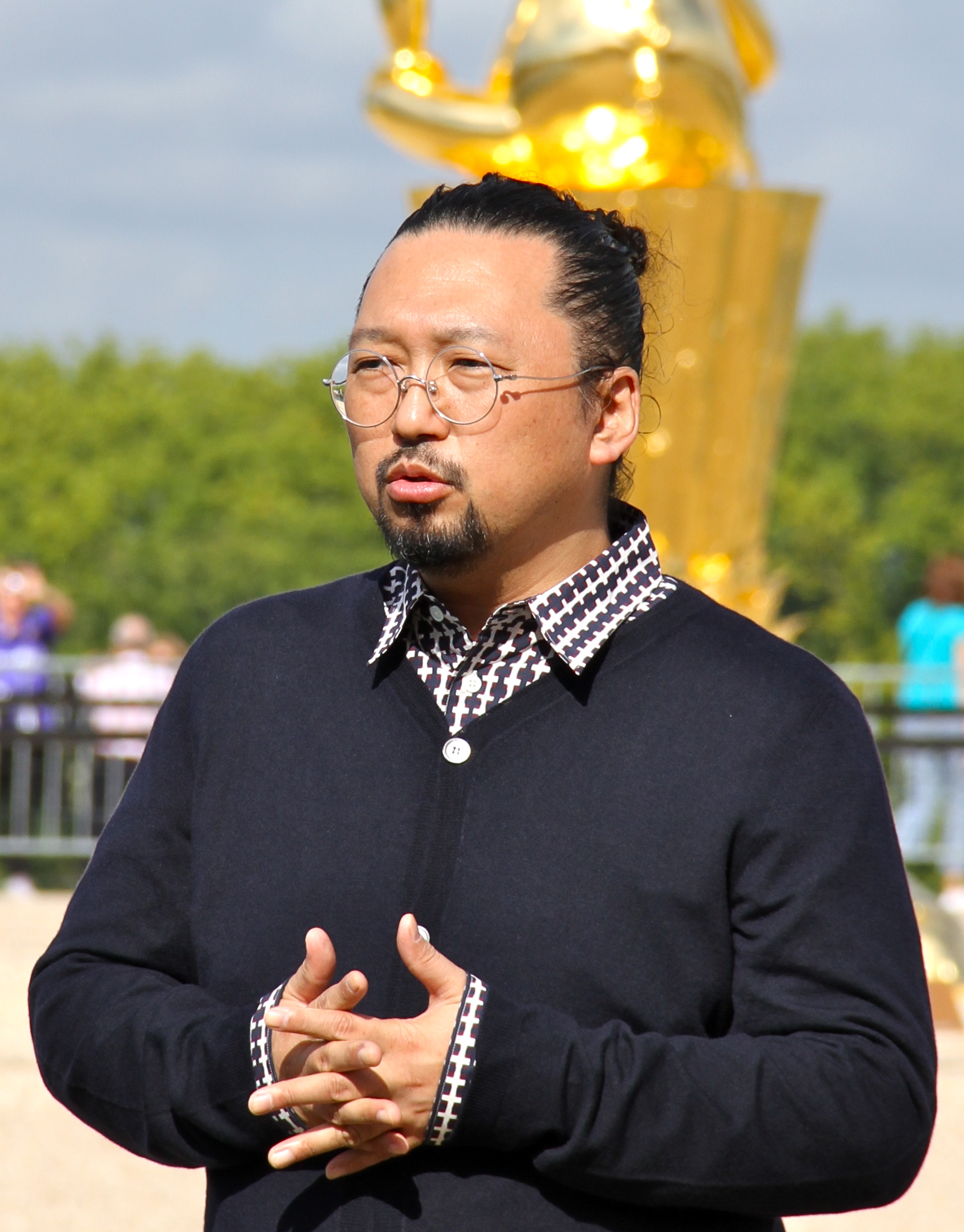
- Takashi Murakami, a contemporary Japanese artist
- Pronunciation: Ta-ka-shi
- Gender: Male

Origin
- Origin: Japanese
- Meaning: It can have many different meanings depending on the kanji used.
- Region of origin: Japan

Other names
- Related names: Takeshi; Takanobu; Takaya; Takako; Takami; Takana

Takashi (たかし, タカシ) is a masculine Japanese given name.

It is often abbreviated to "Tak" among people of Japanese origin in North America.

== Written forms ==
The name Takashi can have multiple different meanings depending on which kanji is used to write it. Possible forms of the name include:

- 隆 - "prosperous noble"
- 喬士 - "high, boasting, samurai, gentleman"
- 崇史 - "adore, revere, chronicler, history"
- 孝 - "filial piety, serve parents"
- 貴志
- 敬

Takashi can also be written in hiragana and/or katakana:

- タカシ (katakana)
- たかし (hiragana)

== People with the name ==
- Takashi Abe (阿部 隆; born 1967), Japanese professional shogi player
- Takashi Abe (footballer) (安部 崇士; born 1997), Japanese footballer
- Takashi Agoh (吾郷 孝視; born 1941), Japanese mathematician
- Takashi Aiki (相木 崇; born 1978), Japanese retired Nippon Professional Baseball player
- Takashi Aizawa (相澤 貴志; born 1982), Japanese former football player
- Takashi Akasaka (1925-2010), Japanese engineering professor
- Takashi Akatsuka (赤塚 隆; born 1973), Japanese rugby union player
- Takashi Akiyama (秋山 貴嗣; born 1992), Japanese footballer
- Takashi Amano (天野 尚; 1954–2015), Japanese photographer, aquarist and designer
- Takashi Amano (footballer) (天野 貴史; born 1986), Japanese football player
- Takashi Aonishi (青西 高嗣; born 1968), Japanese music artist
- Takashi Aoyagi (青柳 隆志; born 1961), Japanese scholar
- Takashi Arai (新井 卓; born 1978), Japanese photographer/visual artist
- Takashi Araya (荒谷 卓; born 1959), Japanese martial artist and author
- Takashi Asahina (朝比奈 隆; 1908–2001), Japanese conductor
- Takashi Asano (浅野 孝; born 1937), Japanese-born environmental engineer and a professor
- Takashi Awamori (粟森 喬; 1939–2023), Japanese businessman and politician
- Takashi Chinen (知念 孝; born 1967), Japanese former artistic gymnast
- Takashi Dekita (出耒田 敬; born 1991), Japanese volleyball player
- Takashi Eda (江田 孝; 1923–1978), Japanese Nippon Professional Baseball pitcher
- Takashi Endo (遠藤 敬; born 1968), Japanese politician
- Takashi Esaki (江崎 孝; born 1956), Japanese politician
- Takashi Eto (衛藤 昂; born 1991), Japanese track and field athlete
- Takashi Fujii (藤井 隆; born 1972), Japanese entertainment personality
- Takashi Fujii (footballer) (藤井 貴; born 1986), Japanese former football player
- Takashi Fujinama (藤沼 貴; 1931—2012), Japanese translator
- Takashi Fujisawa (藤沢 隆; born 1943), Japanese retired ski jumper and Nordic combined skier
- Takashi Fujitani, Japanese historian
- Takashi Fujiwara (藤原 崇; born 1983), Japanese politician
- Takashi Fukaya (深谷 隆司; born 1935), Japanese retired politician
- Takashi Fukunishi (福西 崇史; born 1976), Japanese former professional footballer
- Takashi Fukutani (福谷 たかし; 1952–2000), Japanese manga artist
- Takashi Furuya (古谷 充; 1936–2020), Japanese jazz saxophonist and vocalist
- Takashi Gojobori (五條堀 孝; born 1951), Japanese molecular biologist
- Takashi Haase Shibayama (ハーゼ柴山 崇; born 1980), Japanese equestrian
- Takashi Hagino (萩野 崇; born 1948), Japanese actor
- Takashi Hanyūda (羽生田 俊; born 1951), Japanese politician
- Takashi Hara (原 敬; 1856–1921), Japanese politician and Prime Minister of Japan
- Takashi Hara (artist) (ハラタカシ; born 1983), Japanese contemporary artist
- Takashi Hasegawa, Japanese electrical engineer and programmer
- Takashi Hashiguchi (橋口 たかし; born 1967), Japanese manga artist
- Takashi Hibiki (日引 俊詞; born 1963), Japanese scientist
- Takashi Hidai (born 1934), Japanese wheelchair curler
- Takashi Hikino (曳野 孝; born 1967), Japanese economist and educator
- Takashi Hiraide (平出 隆; born 1950), Japanese poet and critic
- Takashi Hirajima (平島 崇; born 1982), Japanese former football player
- Takashi Hirano (平野 孝; born 1974), Japanese former professional footballer
- Takashi Hiraoka (平岡 敬; born 1927), Japanese mayor of Hiroshima from 1991 to 1999
- Takashi Hirata (平田 孝; born 1936), Japanese wrestler
- Takashi Hirayasu (平安 隆; born 1952), Okinawan musician
- Takashi "Taka" Hirose (広瀬 隆; born 1967), Japanese musician and chef
- Takashi Hirose (swimmer) (廣瀬 隆; 1923–2002), American competitive swimmer
- Takashi Hirose (writer) (広瀬 隆; born 1943), Japanese writer
- Takashi Hishikari (菱刈 隆; 1871–1952), Japanese general in the Imperial Japanese Army
- Takashi Hosokawa (細川 たかし; born 1950), Japanese enka singer
- Takashi Ichiba (市場 孝士; born 1960), Japanese weightlifter
- Takashi Ichinojō (逸ノ城 駿; born 1993), Mongolian sumo wrestler
- Takashi Iizuka (飯塚 高史; born 1966), Japanese retired professional wrestler
- Takashi Iizuka (game designer) (飯塚 隆; born 1970), Japanese video game director and designer
- Takashi Ikegami (池上 高志; born 1961), Japanese professor
- Takashi Ikenaga (池永 天志; born 1993), Japanese shogi player
- Takashi Ikenoue (池ノ上 孝司; born 1955), Japanese handball player
- Takashi Imamura (born 1934), Japanese rower
- Takashi Inagaki (稲垣 隆史; 1937–2025), Japanese actor and voice actor
- Takashi Inoguchi (猪口 孝; 1944–2024), Japanese academic researcher
- Takashi Inoue (井之上 隆志; 1960–2017), Japanese actor
- Takashi Inoue (author) (井之上 喬; born 1944), Japanese public relations practitioner, scholar and theorist
- Takashi Inui (乾 貴士; born 1988), Japanese professional footballer
- Takashi Inukai (犬養 孝; 1907–1998), Japanese literature academic
- Takashi Irie (入江 隆; born 1958), Japanese retired light-flyweight freestyle wrestler
- Takashi Ishiguro (石黒 峻士; born 1997), Japanese freestyle wrestler
- Takashi Ishii (baseball) (石井 貴; born 1971), Japanese professional baseball pitcher and coach
- Takashi Ishii (film director) (石井 隆; 1946–2022), Japanese film director, screenwriter and manga artist
- Takashi Ishikawa (石川 敬士; born 1953), Japanese former professional wrestler and sumo wrestler
- Takashi Ishimoto (石本 隆; 1935–2009), Japanese butterfly swimmer
- Takashi Ishizaki (石崎 隆), Japanese mixed martial artist
- Takashi Ishizeki (石関 貴史; born 1972), Japanese former politician
- Takashi Ito (basketball) (伊藤 駿; born 1990), Japanese professional basketball player
- Takashi Ito (director) (伊藤 高志; born 1956), Japanese experimental filmmaker
- Takashi Ito (伊藤 隆; born 1970), Japanese kickboxer
- Takashi Itoyama (糸山 隆司; born 1936), Japanese basketball player
- Takashi Iwashige (いわしげ 孝; 1954–2013), Japanese manga artist
- Takashi Kakihara (垣原 隆司; born 1937), Japanese ice hockey player
- Takashi Kako (加古 隆; born 1947), Japanese pianist and composer
- Takashi Kamiyama (born 1973), Japanese professional golfer
- Takashi Kamoshida (鴨志田 誉; born 1985), Japanese football player
- Takashi Kanai (金井 貢史; born 1990), Japanese former professional football player
- Takashi Kanemoto (兼本 貴司; born 1970), Japanese professional golfer
- Takashi Kanezawa (金沢 孝史; born 1973), Japanese shogi player
- Takashi Kano (加納 孝; 1920–2000), Japanese football player
- Takashi Kasahara (footballer, born 1918) (笠原 隆; born 1918), Japanese football player
- Takashi Kasahara (footballer, born 1988) (笠原 昂史; born 1988), Japanese professional footballer
- Takashi Kashiwabara (柏原 崇; born 1977), Japanese former actor
- Takashi Kashiwada (柏田 貴史; born 1971), Japanese retired professional baseball player
- Takashi Kato (加藤 嵩士; born 1989), Japanese handball player
- Takashi Kawai (川井 貴志; born 1976), Japanese Nippon Professional Baseball pitcher
- Takashi Kawamura (businessman) (川村 隆; born 1939), Japanese director and the chairman of TEPCO
- Takashi Kawamura (politician) (河村 たかし; born 1948), Japanese politician
- Takashi Kawanishi (川西 隆), Japanese football player
- Takashi Kawano (河野 貴志; born 1996), Japanese footballer
- Takashi Kii (城井 崇; born 1973), Japanese politician
- Takashi Kijima (杵島 隆; 1920–2011), Japanese photographer
- Takashi Kikutani (菊谷 崇; born 1980), Japanese rugby union player
- Takashi Kimura (politician) (木村 敬; born 1974), Japanese politician
- Takashi Kimura (water polo) (木村 隆; born 1950), Japanese former water polo player
- Takashi Kitamura (北村 隆; born 1977), Japanese skier
- Takashi Kitano (北野 貴之; born 1982), Japanese former football player
- Takashi Kiyama (木山 隆之; born 1972), Japanese professional football manager and former player
- Takashi Kobayashi (racing driver) (小林 崇志; born 1987), Japanese racing driver
- Takashi Kobayashi (wrestler) (小林 孝至; born 1963), Japanese wrestler
- Takashi Kogure (小暮 卓史; born 1980), Japanese racing driver
- Takashi Koizumi (小泉 堯史; born 1955), Japanese film director
- Takashi Kojima (小島 卓; born 1973), Japanese former football player
- Takashi Komatsu (小松 隆志; born 1967), Japanese male triple jumper
- Takashi Kondo (footballer) (近藤 貴司; born 1992), Japanese football player
- Takashi Kondo (gymnast) (近藤 天; 1911–1994), Japanese gymnast
- Takashi Kondō (近藤 隆; born 1979), Japanese voice actor
- Takashi Koshimoto (越本 隆志; born 1971), Japanese boxer
- Takashi Kosugi (小杉 隆; born 1935), Japanese retired politician
- Takashi Koyari (小鑓 隆史; born 1966), Japanese politician
- Takashi Kuramoto (倉本 崇史; born 1984), Japanese former football player
- Takashi Kurihara (栗原 孝; born 1947), Japanese professional golfer
- Takashi Kurosu (黒須 隆; born 1968), Japanese baseball catcher
- Takashi Kushida (串田 誉司; 1935–2012), Japanese aikido master and the chief instructor
- Takashi Kuwahara (桑原 隆; born 1948), Japanese former football player and manager
- Takashi Manei (万永 貴司; born 1972), Japanese former Nippon Professional Baseball infielder
- Takashi Maruyama (丸山 孝; born 1953), Japanese volleyball player
- Masuda Takashi (益田 孝; 1848–1938), Japanese industrialist, investor, and art collector
- Takashi Masuda (basketball) (増田 貴史; born 1940), Japanese basketball player
- Takashi Masuda (computer scientist) (益田 隆司; born 1939), Japanese computer scientist
- Takashi Masuzaki (増崎 孝司; born 1962), Japanese guitarist, composer and arranger
- Takashi Matsuhashi (松橋 高司; born 1932), Japanese cross-country skier
- Takashi Matsui (松井 孝; born 1940), Japanese ski jumper
- Takashi Matsumoto (lyricist) (松本 隆; born 1949), Japanese lyricist and former musician
- Takashi Matsumoto (poet) (松本 たかし; 1906–1956), Japanese haiku poet
- Takashi Matsunaga (松永 貴志; born 1986), Japanese jazz pianist
- Takashi Matsuo (actor, born 1960) (松尾 貴史; born 1960), Japanese tarento, narrator, disc jockey, actor and columnist
- Takashi Matsuo (actor, born 1996) (松尾 太陽; born 1996), Japanese actor and vocalist
- Takashi Matsuoka, Japanese-American writer
- Takashi Matsuyama (actor) (松山 鷹志; born 1960), Japanese actor and voice actor
- Takashi Matsuyama (松山 崇; 1908-1977), Japanese production designer and art director
- Takashi Midorikawa (緑川 貴士; born 1985), Japanese politician
- Takashi Miike (三池 崇史; born 1960), Japanese filmmaker
- Takashi Miki (三木 隆司; born 1978), Japanese former football player
- Takashi Miki (javelin thrower) (三木 孝志; born 1939), Japanese former javelin thrower
- Takashi Mitsubayashi (三ッ林 隆志; 1953–2010), Japanese politician
- Takashi Mitsukuri (三栗 崇; born 1939), Japanese gymnast and Olympic champion
- Takashi Miura (三浦 隆司; born 1984), Japanese former professional boxer
- Takashi Miwa (三輪 隆; born 1969), Japanese former professional baseball player
- Takashi Miyahara (宮原 巍; 1934–2019), Japanese-born Nepalese tourism entrepreneur and politician
- Takashi Miyake (三宅 敬; born 1980), Japanese former international rugby union player
- Takashi Miyazawa (宮澤 崇史; born 1978), Japanese former professional racing cyclist
- Takashi Mizuno (水野 隆; born 1931), Japanese footballer
- Takashi Mizunuma (水沼 貴史; born 1960), Japanese footballer and manager
- Takashi Morita (森田 高; born 1967), Japanese politician
- Takashi Moriya (森屋 隆; born 1967), Japanese politician
- Takashi Mukaibo (向坊 隆; 1917–2002), Japanese chemist and nuclear engineer
- Takashi Mura (無良 隆志; born 1960), Japanese figure skating coach and former competitor
- Takashi Murakami (村上 隆; born 1962), Japanese contemporary artist
- Takashi Murakami (golfer) (村上 隆; born 1944), Japanese professional golfer
- Takashi Murayama (村山 隆志; born 1951), Japanese rower
- Takashi Nagai (永井 隆; 1908–1951), Japanese physician and survivor of the Nagasaki bombing
- Takashi Nagai (wrestler) (永井 隆; born 1936), Japanese former wrestler
- Takashi Nagao (長尾 隆史; born 1957), Japanese former track and field athlete
- Takashi Nagasaki (長崎 尚志; born 1954), Japanese author, manga writer and former editor of manga
- Takashi Nagasako (長嶝 高士; born 1964), Japanese voice actor
- Takashi Nagase (永瀬 隆; 1918–2011), Japanese military interpreter
- Takashi Nagata (永田 崇; born 1972), Japanese former football player
- Takashi Nagatsuka (長塚 節; 1879–1915), Japanese novelist and poet
- Takashi Nagayama (永山 たかし; born 1978), Japanese actor
- Takashi Nagayasu (長安 豊; born 1968), Japanese politician
- Takashi Nakakura (中蔵 隆志; born 1977), Japanese mixed martial artist
- Takashi Nakamura (中村 たかし; born 1995), Japanese animator, and anime director
- Takashi Nakano (中野 高; born 1984), Japanese former swimmer
- Takashi Narita (成田 貴志; born 1969), Japanese former volleyball player
- Takashi Negishi (根岸 隆; born 1933), Japanese neo-Walrasian economist
- Takashi Nemoto (根本 敬; born 1958), Japanese comics artist and illustrator
- Takashi Niigaki (新垣 隆; born 1970), Japanese music teacher
- Takashi Nikaido (二階堂 高嗣; born 1990), Japanese actor and singer
- Takashi Nishida (西田 崇; born 1976), Japanese snowboarder
- Takashi Nishimoto (西本 聖; born 1956), Japanese baseball coach and retired pitcher
- Takashi Nishiyama (西山 隆志), Japanese video game designer, director and producer
- Takashi Nishizawa (西沢 隆), Japanese mixed martial artist
- Takashi Nomura (野村 孝; 1927–2015), Japanese film director
- Takashi Nonomura (野々村 孝; born 1969), Japanese wrestler
- Takashi Odawara (小田原 貴; born 1992), Japanese professional footballer
- Takashi Ogasawara (小笠原 孝; born 1976), Japanese professional baseball pitcher
- Takashi Ogino (荻野 貴司; born 1985), Japanese professional baseball outfielder and shortstop
- Takashi Ōhara (大原 崇; born 1978), Japanese voice actor
- Takashi Ohno, American politician
- Takashi Ohori (大堀 孝; born 1969), Japanese bobsledder
- Takashi Ohyama (大山 喬史), Japanese President of Tokyo Medical and Dental University
- Takashi Okamura (comedian) (岡村 隆史; born 1970), Japanese comedian
- Takashi Okamura (photographer) (岡村 崔; 1927–2014), Japanese photographer
- Takashi Okazaki (岡崎 能士; born 1974), Japanese manga artist, visual designer and graphic designer
- Takashi Okuhara (奥原 崇; born 1972), Japanese former football player
- Takashi Onishi (大西 貴; born 1971), Japanese former football player
- Takashi Ono (gymnast) (小野 喬; born 1931), Japanese gymnast
- Takashi Ono (judoka) (小野 卓志; born 1980), Japanese judoka
- Takashi Ono (mathematician) (小野 孝; 1928–2026), Japanese-born American mathematician
- Takashi Onozuka (小野塚 貴志; born 1974), Japanese voice actor
- Takashi Ōtsuka (大塚 高司; born 1964), Japanese former politician
- Takashi Ozaki (尾崎 隆; 1952–2011), Japanese mountaineer
- Takashi Rakuyama (楽山 孝志; born 1980), Japanese former football player
- Takashi Saito (斎藤 隆; born 1970), Japanese baseball player
- Takashi Saito (footballer) (齋藤 恭志; born 1993), Japanese footballer
- Takashi Saito (sumo wrestler) (斉藤 俊; 1990-2007), Japanese sumo wrestler
- Takashi Saito (weightlifter) (斎藤 隆; born 1953), Japanese weightlifter
- Takashi Sakai (酒井 隆; 1887–1946), Japanese general
- Takashi Sanada (眞田 卓; born 1985), Japanese Paralympic tennis player
- Takashi Sasagawa (笹川 堯; born 1935), Japanese former politician
- Takashi Sasagawa (baseball) (笹川 隆; born 1979), Japanese former professional baseball infielder
- Takashi Sasaki (佐々木 貴; born 1975), Japanese professional wrestler
- Takashi Sasano (笹野 高史; born 1948), Japanese actor
- Takashi Sato (佐藤 天; born 1990), Japanese mixed martial artist
- Takashi Sawada (澤田 崇; born 1991), Japanese footballer
- Takashi Sekizuka (関塚 隆; born 1960), Japanese former football player and manager
- Takashi Shibata (born 1951), Japanese biathlete
- Takashi Shiina (椎名 高志; born 1965), Japanese manga artist
- Takashi Shimizu (清水 崇; born 1972), Japanese filmmaker
- Takashi Shimizu (baseball) (清水 誉; born 1984), Japanese professional baseball catcher
- Takashi Shimoda (下田 崇; born 1975), Japanese footballer
- Takashi Shimokawara (下川原 孝; 1906–2011), Japanese centenarian
- Takashi Shimura (志村 喬; 1905–1982), Japanese actor
- Takashi Shinohara (篠原 孝; born 1948), Japanese politician
- Takashi Shirozu (白水 隆; 1917–2004), Japanese entomologist
- Takashi Shoji (庄司 孝; born 1971), Japanese football player and manager
- Takashi Sorimachi (反町 隆史; born 1973), Japanese singer and actor
- Takashi Sugimura (杉村 隆; 1926–2020), Japanese biochemist
- Takashi Sugiura (杉浦 貴; born 1970), Japanese professional wrestler
- Takashi Suzuki (government official) (鈴木 隆史; born 1949), Japanese public official
- Takashi Suzuki (politician) (鈴木 隆; 1882–1978), Japanese speculator-turned politician
- Takashi Tachibana (立花 孝志; born 1967), Japanese social activist, journalist, accountant and politician
- Takashi Tachibana (journalist) (立花 隆; 1940–2021), Japanese journalist
- Takashi Tachikawa (立川 隆史; born 1975), Japanese former baseball outfielder
- Takashi Taguchi (actor) (田口 昂; 1942–2016), Japanese voice actor
- Takashi Taguchi (handballer) (田口 隆; born 1961), Japanese former handball player
- Takashi Takabayashi (高林 隆; 1931–2009), Japanese football player
- Takashi Takagi (born 1962), Japanese luger
- Takashi Takai (高井 崇志; born 1969), Japanese politician and former bureaucrat
- Takashi Takeda (武田 孝; born 1940), Japanese alpine skier
- Takashi Takeuchi (武内 崇; born 1973), Japanese artist
- Takashi Tamura (田村 孝; born 1961), Japanese sailor
- Takashi Taniguchi (谷口 節; 1947–2012), Japanese voice actor
- Takashi Taniguchi (scientist) (谷口 尚; born 1959), Japanese material scientist
- Takashi Tanihata (谷畑 孝; born 1947), Japanese former politician
- Takashi Tanoue (田上 高; 1947–2009), Japanese wrestler
- Takashi Teraoka (寺岡 孝; 1942–2011), Japanese baseball player and coach
- Takashi Teshirogi (てしろぎ たかし; born 1963), Japanese manga artist
- Takashi Tezuka (手塚 卓志; born 1960), Japanese video game designer
- Takashi Tojo, Japanese mixed martial artist
- Takashi Tokita (時田 貴司; born 1965), Japanese video game developer
- Takashi Tomura (born 1958), Japanese former athlete
- Takashi Toritani (鳥谷 敬; born 1981), Japanese former professional baseball shortstop, commentator, critic and coach
- Takashi Tsuburai (粒来 敬詞; born 1951), Japanese ice hockey player
- Takashi Tsuji (辻 高志; born 1977), Japanese former rugby union player
- Takashi Tsukamoto (塚本 高史; born 1982), Japanese actor, singer, and model
- Takashi Uchino (footballer, born 1988) (内野 貴志; born 1990), Japanese football player
- Takashi Uchino (footballer, born 2001) (内野 貴史; born 2001), Japanese professional footballer
- Takashi Uchiyama (内山 高志; born 1979), Japanese former professional boxer
- Takashi Uchiyama (gymnast) (内山 隆; born 1974), Japanese gymnast
- Takashi Uemoto (上本 崇司; born 1990), Japanese baseball player
- Takashi Uemura (academic) (植村 隆; born 1958), Japanese academic and former journalist
- Takashi Uemura (footballer) (上村 崇士; born 1973), Japanese former football player and manager
- Takashi Uesugi (上杉 隆; born 1968), Japanese freelance journalist and former research assistant for the New York Times
- Takashi Ukaji (宇梶 剛士; born 1962), Japanese actor
- Takashi Umeda (梅田 高志; born 1976), Japanese footballer
- Takashi Umezawa (梅澤 貴史; born 1972), Japanese footballer
- Takashi Umino (海野 隆司; born 1997), Japanese professional baseball catcher
- Takashi Usami (宇佐美 貴史; born 1992), Japanese professional footballer
- Takashi Usui (臼井 孝; born 1968), Japanese music marketer and Music Writer
- Takashi Uto (宇都 隆史; born 1974), Japanese politician
- Takashi Uwano (宇和野 貴史; born 1976), Japanese retired professional wrestler
- Takashi Wakasugi (若杉 昂志; born 1988 or 1989), Japanese comedian
- Takashi Watanabe (渡部 高志; born 1957), Japanese anime director
- Takashi Watari (亘 崇詞; born 1957), Japanese former footballer
- Takashi Yabe (矢部 孝; born 1950), Japanese professor
- Takashi Yagihashi (born 1958), Japanese chef
- Takashi Yamada (山田 貴司; born 1938), Japanese sailor
- Takashi Yamaguchi (actor, born 1936) (山口 崇; 1936–2025), Japanese actor
- Takashi Yamaguchi (actor, born 1974) (山口 貴史; born 1974), Japanese actor
- Takashi Yamaguchi (architect) (山口 隆; born 1953), Japanese architect
- Takashi Yamahashi (山橋 貴史; born 1972), Japanese former football player
- Takashi Yamamoto (pianist) (山本 貴志; born 1983), Japanese pianist
- Takashi Yamamoto (politician) (山本 孝史; 1949–2007), Japanese politician
- Takashi Yamamoto (swimmer) (山本 貴司; born 1978), Japanese Olympic medal-winning swimmer
- Takashi Yamamura (sailor) (山村 尚史; born 1940), Japanese sailor
- Takashi Yamanouchi (山内 孝; born 1945), Japanese businessman
- Takashi Yamashita (山下 貴司; born 1965), Japanese prosecutor and politician
- Takashi Yamazaki (山崎 貴; born 1964), Japanese filmmaker and visual effects supervisor
- Takashi Yanase (やなせ たかし; 1919–2013), Japanese manga artist and writer, poet, illustrator and lyricist
- Takashi Yano (矢野 隆司; born 1960), Japanese politician
- Takashi Yokoyama (swimmer) (横山 隆志; 1913–1945), Japanese swimmer
- Takashi Yokoyama (water polo) (横山 隆; born 1940), Japanese water polo player
- Takashi Yorino (従野 孝司; born 1950), Japanese former racing driver
- Takashi Yoshida (吉田 隆司; born 1982), better known as Cyber Kong, Japanese professional wrestler
- Takashi Yoshida (comedian) (吉田 敬; born 1973), Japanese comedian
- Takashi Yoshikawa (𠮷川 貴史; born 1994), Japanese field hockey player
- Takashi Yoshimatsu (吉松 隆; born 1953), Japanese composer
- Takashi Yuasa (湯浅 卓; born 1955), Japanese lawyer

== Fictional characters ==
- Takashi Ayanokoji (綾小路 天) a character from Pita Ten
- Takashi Hayase, a character from The Super Dimension Fortress Macross
- Takashi Kawamura (The Prince of Tennis) (河村 隆), a character from The Prince of Tennis
- Takashi Komuro (小室 孝), a character from Highschool of the Dead
- Takashi Kurosawa, a character from The Hitman's Bodyguard
- Takashi Morinozuka (銛之塚 崇) (Mori), a character from Ouran High School Host Club
- Takashi Natsume (夏目 貴志), the title character from Natsume's Book of Friends
- Takashi Ryugasaki (竜ヶ崎 鷹士), a character from Cyber Team in Akihabara
- Takashi 'Shiro' Shirogane, a character from Voltron: Legendary Defender
- Takashi Sone, a character from Haru yo, Koi
- Takashi Takeda, nicknamed "Jumbo" (竹田 隆), a character from Yotsuba&!
- Takashi Yamazaki (山崎 貴史), a character from Cardcaptor Sakura
- Takashi Kovacs, a character from Altered Carbon
- Takashi Mitsuhashi, a character from Kyō Kara Ore Wa!!
- Takashi Mitsuya, a character from Tokyo Revengers
- Takashi Todoroki, a character from Yu-Gi-Oh! Zexal
- Takashi, a supporting character who goes by the mutant name Tiger Claw in Teenage Mutant Ninja Turtles
