= Takaya (disambiguation) =

Takaya is a Japanese electronics company.

Takaya may also refer to:

- Takaya (name)
- Takaya Station
- Takaya (wolf), a Canadian lone wolf
- Takaya (Sudan), communal kitchen in Sudan

== See also ==
- Komoriutanosato-Takaya Station
