= Takashi Kimura =

Takashi Kimura may refer to:

- Kengo Kimura (born 1953), retired Japanese professional wrestler, ring name Takashi Kimura
- Takashi Kimura (politician) (born 1974), Japanese politician, Governor of Kumamoto Prefecture
- Takashi Kimura (water polo) (born 1950), Japanese former water polo player
- Takashi Kimura, a.k.a. t-kimura, performer in and producer of the Japanese music group M.O.V.E
