= Kanezawa =

Kanezawa (written: 金沢) is a Japanese surname. Notable people with the surname include:

- Kanezawa Sanetoki (金沢 実時, 1224–1276), founder of the Kanazawa Bunko
- Takashi Kanezawa (金沢 孝史, born 1973), Japanese shogi player
