= Sonic the Hedgehog (8-bit video game) =

1991 video game

- North American Game Gear box art by Greg Martin
- Developer: Ancient
- Publisher: Sega
- Director: Ayano Koshiro
- Programmer: Shinobu Hayashi
- Artists: Ayano Koshiro; Takefuni Yunoue
- Composer: Yuzo Koshiro
- Series: Sonic the Hedgehog
- Platforms: Master System, Game Gear
- Release: Master System: EU: November 8, 1991; NA: November 1991; Game Gear: EU: November 18, 1991; JP: December 28, 1991; NA: February 1992
- Genre: Platform
- Mode: Single-player

Sonic the Hedgehog (Note: Japanese: ソニック・ザ・ヘッジホッグ, Hepburn: Sonikku za Hejjihoggu) is a 1991 platform video game developed by Ancient and published by Sega for the 8-bit Master System and Game Gear. It is a companion to the original Sonic the Hedgehog that was developed for the 16-bit Sega Genesis. The 8-bit Sonic is a side-scrolling game similar in style to the 16-bit game, albeit reduced in complexity to fit the 8-bit systems. Ancient, a studio founded by composer Yuzo Koshiro, was contracted to develop the 8-bit Sonic game.

The premise and story of the 8-bit Sonic game are identical to that of the 16-bit game: as the anthropomorphic hedgehog Sonic, the player races through levels to rescue the imprisoned animals Doctor Robotnik plots to turn into robots. Gameplay is similar, Sonic collects rings while avoiding obstacles, but is paced much slower as the 8-bit version focuses more on exploration. While some level themes, such as Green Hill Zone, are borrowed from the 16-bit game, others are original. It also features a different soundtrack from Koshiro, which comprises new material alongside some rearrangements of Masato Nakamura's tracks for the 16-bit game.

Reviewers acclaimed the 8-bit Sonic game for its level variety, visuals, gameplay, and audio. Many believed that it compared favorably to its 16-bit counterpart, although some criticism was directed at its low difficulty and short length. Game journalists retrospectively considered it one of the best Master System and Game Gear games. The 8-bit Sonic game has been rereleased through various Sonic game compilations and Nintendo's Virtual Console. It received a sequel, Sonic the Hedgehog 2, in 1992. It was also Ancient's first game and the only Sonic game they developed.

== Gameplay ==
Sonic, the player-controlled character, fights Doctor Robotnik in Bridge Zone, the game's second level.

The 8-bit Sonic the Hedgehog is a side-scrolling platform game similar in gameplay and style to the original 16-bit Sega Genesis game of the same name, save for several new and altered game mechanics. As in the original, the anthropomorphic hedgehog Sonic ventures to rescue the animal population of South Island from the diabolical Doctor Robotnik, who plots to turn them into robots. The player jumps between platforms, avoids enemy and inanimate obstacles, and breaks televisions to collect shields, speed shoes, and invincibility, and mark checkpoints. Like the original, Sonic collects rings, which protect him from being hit by an enemy or obstacle. (Note: Unlike the original game, Sonic cannot re-collect rings when hit.) The player starts the game with three lives and will lose one if they are hit without carrying any rings, drown, fall into a bottomless pit, or reach the act's 10-minute time limit.The game ends when the player runs out of lives, although they can return to the beginning of the current act if they have any continues. Gameplay is slightly slower and more focused on exploration than the original.

Sonic travels through six levels called zones, each consisting of two main acts and a boss battle with Robotnik. The zones are based on various themes, such as grassy plains, ancient ruins, and jungles. While some of the level themes, such as Green Hill Zone, are borrowed from the 16-bit version, others are original, and all the level designs are different and contain no vertical loops. Some of the game's levels require quick precision and others require the player to go underwater. Certain acts have Chaos Emeralds hidden within them, and the player must collect all six to obtain the best possible ending. At the end of each main act, the player hits a signpost, which will spin and land on an image; it can award bonuses depending on the image it settles on. If the player has over 50 rings, they can access a pinball-esque bonus stage where more rings and continues can be collected.

== Development ==
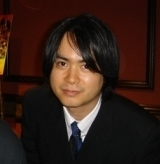
Composer Yuzo Koshiro in 2006

In 1990, Sega released the Game Gear, an 8-bit handheld game console designed to compete with Nintendo's Game Boy. Around the same time, Sonic Team worked on Sonic the Hedgehog for the 16-bit Genesis and Sega wanted to increase consumer awareness of the Game Gear by producing a version of Sonic for the system. 22-year old composer Yuzo Koshiro had recently started working with Sega, having been asked to compose the soundtrack for The Revenge of Shinobi (1989). Afterwards, he told a section chief he could develop games himself. As a result, a general manager, (Note: Koshiro only referred to the manager as Takami-san and said he oversaw the Genesis and Game Gear. According to video game journalist John Szczepaniak, he is likely referring to Tomio Takami, who created the Sega CD hardware.) whom Koshiro met while working on The Revenge of Shinobi, asked him to start developing a Game Gear version of Sonic. Koshiro founded Ancient to develop the game because Sega could not make contracts with individuals. His sister Ayano Koshiro served as director and his mother Tomo Koshiro had a "behind the scenes" role, while the first programmer he hired was Shinobu Hayashi. The 8-bit Sonic was created specifically for the Game Gear, but Sega also had Ancient develop a version for the Master System, which was selling well and had similar hardware.

Porting the original game to the 8-bit hardware was impossible, so Ancient built their Sonic from scratch. The team decided to make their version completely different from its 16-bit counterpart. According to Koshiro, the game had three phases of development. In the first phase, Ancient developed the game with the 16-bit version in mind. The second and third phases were largely Ancient's own ideas, with Sega supervising their work. Koshiro thought reinventing Sonic for 8-bit hardware was challenging, as he did not work at Sega and had never developed a game before. However, Sega had faith in him because of his relationship to the company. Koshiro composed the soundtrack and sought to retain the feel of the 16-bit version. He converted Masato Nakamura's 16-bit Sonic score to the 8-bit programmable sound generator to start, but ended up using only three of those tracks; the remainder of the music is Koshiro's work.

== Release history ==
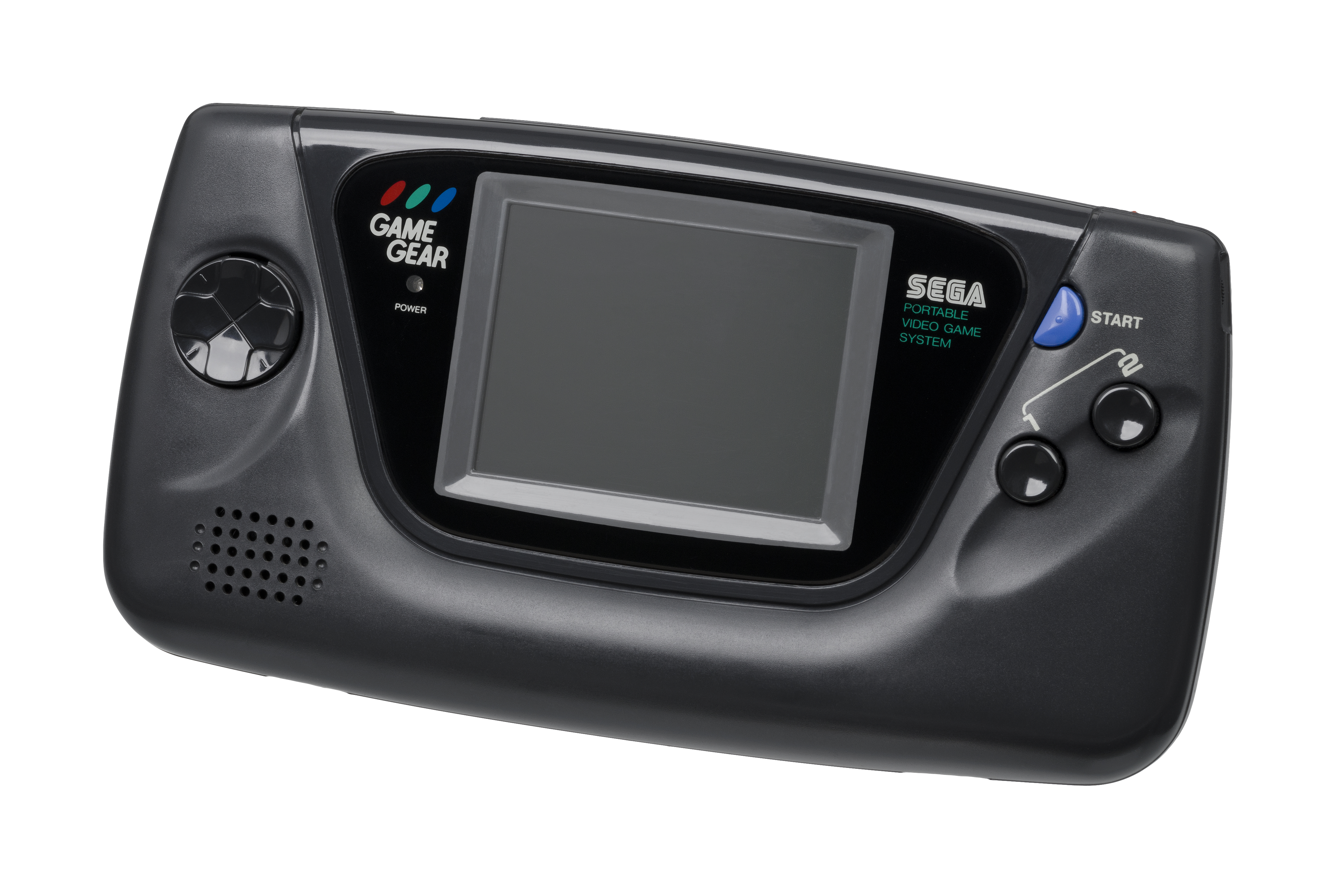
Sonic the Hedgehog was initially developed for the Game Gear.

While the Game Gear version was developed first, Sega released the Master System version before the Game Gear version. In Europe, the game was built into later versions of the Master System, while in North America, it was the console's swan song. The Master System had failed to gain a foothold in North America, so its version of Sonic became a collector's item. The American Master System release is simply an import of the European version; Sega covered the European Article Number on the game packaging with a Universal Product Code sticker. Nintendo World Report described the game as a "weird" release for the franchise because it did not focus on speed. Although it was profitable for Sega, the game was not as successful as its 16-bit counterpart. It was released on the Game Gear in Japan on December 28, 1991.

The game has been rereleased in emulated form on several occasions. In 2003, Sega released Sonic Adventure DX: Director's Cut, an enhanced version of the 1998 Sonic game Sonic Adventure for the GameCube and Windows. As the player progresses through the game, they will unlock all 12 Sonic games released for the Game Gear, including the 8-bit Sonic. The Game Gear version is also available through Sonic Mega Collection Plus (2004), a compilation of Sonic games for PlayStation 2, Xbox, and Windows. Sega released the Master System version for the Wii's Virtual Console digital distribution service in Japan and North America in August 2008, and in Europe the following month. The Game Gear version was released for the Nintendo 3DS's Virtual Console in North America on June 7, 2013, followed by PAL regions a week later on June 13, and in Japan on December 4, 2013. It was also released along with the other 11 Game Gear Sonic games on Sonic Origins Plus in 2023.

== Reception ==
Contemporary reception

Review scores
Publication	Score
Computer and Video Games	90% (SMS)
Electronic Gaming Monthly	8/10, 9/10, 9/10, 9/10 (GG)
ACE	4/5 (GG)
Famicom Tsūshin	6/10, 6/10, 6/10, 5/10 (GG)
Go!	93% (GG)
Mean Machines	90% (SMS)
Mega Zone	90% (GG)
Player One	90% (GG)
Video Games & Computer Entertainment	9/10 (GG)

Reviewers acclaimed the 8-bit Sonic. A number of publications described it as a polished recreation of the 16-bit game, with ACE and Mean Machines writing those who owned that version could still enjoy it. The game's level variety and designs, the action-packed and addictive gameplay, and sound and visual quality—thought to be on par with the original version's—were commonly highlighted. ACE was impressed to see the Genesis version's main features brought to the 8-bit systems intact. GamePro also considered its visuals "top-of-the-line" for an 8-bit game. Reviewers in Famicom Tsūshin said the fast-paced gameplay did not lend well to the Game Gear screen and which caused strain on their eyes. French publications were similarly positive: Player One awarded the Master System version 95%, while Joypad gave it 97%. Player One later awarded the Game Gear version 90%.

Reviewers criticized the relatively low difficulty and short length, although Computer and Video Games (CVG) wrote these were also problems in the original and Go! considered the game more challenging than its Genesis predecessor. However, most found the problems did not detract from the experience; CVG wrote that the game still offered the player plenty and was just as good as the Genesis version.

Retrospective reviews for the game's rerelease on the Virtual Console were likewise positive. IGN wrote that although it was not as visually appealing, fast, or ambitious as its 16-bit predecessor, the 8-bit Sonic the Hedgehog was still a competent game in its own right, with unique level designs that managed to retain the feel of the original. Nintendo Life believed it was one of the best platformers for the Master System and felt it was an interesting piece in the Sonic franchise's history, and found the Game Gear version easy to recommend to those who played the 16-bit version and were looking for a new experience, and those who were just starting to play Sonic games. They said "It's short, but it's sweet," and that searching for Chaos Emeralds added replay value. GameSpy, reviewing Sonic Mega Collection Plus, felt the 8-bit Sonic and Sonic Chaos (1993) were the series' only Game Gear installments worth playing.

== Legacy ==
GamesRadar+ named the 8-bit Sonic the fourth best Game Gear game, and they and Retro Gamer named it one of the best Master System games. The 8-bit Sonic game was Ancient's first game and the only Sonic game they developed. Beginning with its 1992 sequel, Sonic the Hedgehog 2, all subsequent 8-bit Sonic platformers were developed by Aspect. The Bridge Zone level's track became one of the most famous pieces of Sonic music, and was used as a basis for Tails' theme in Sonic Adventure.

Some fans have independently developed new ports of the game to run natively on other platforms. In 2019, a fan remake of the game was released for Microsoft Windows and Android, featuring widescreen gameplay and new playable characters, levels, and game mechanics. A fanmade Commodore 64 port was released in December 2021, with the original Z80 assembly code hand-translated to the 6510 CPU.
