= Ikenoue =

Ikenoue (written: 池ノ上) is a Japanese surname. Notable people with the surname include:

- Shunichi Ikenoue (池ノ上 俊一, born 1967), Japanese footballer
- Takashi Ikenoue (池ノ上 孝司, born 1955), Japanese handball player

== See also ==
- Ikenoue Station, a railway station in Setagaya, Tokyo Japan
