= Sendai University Meisei High School =

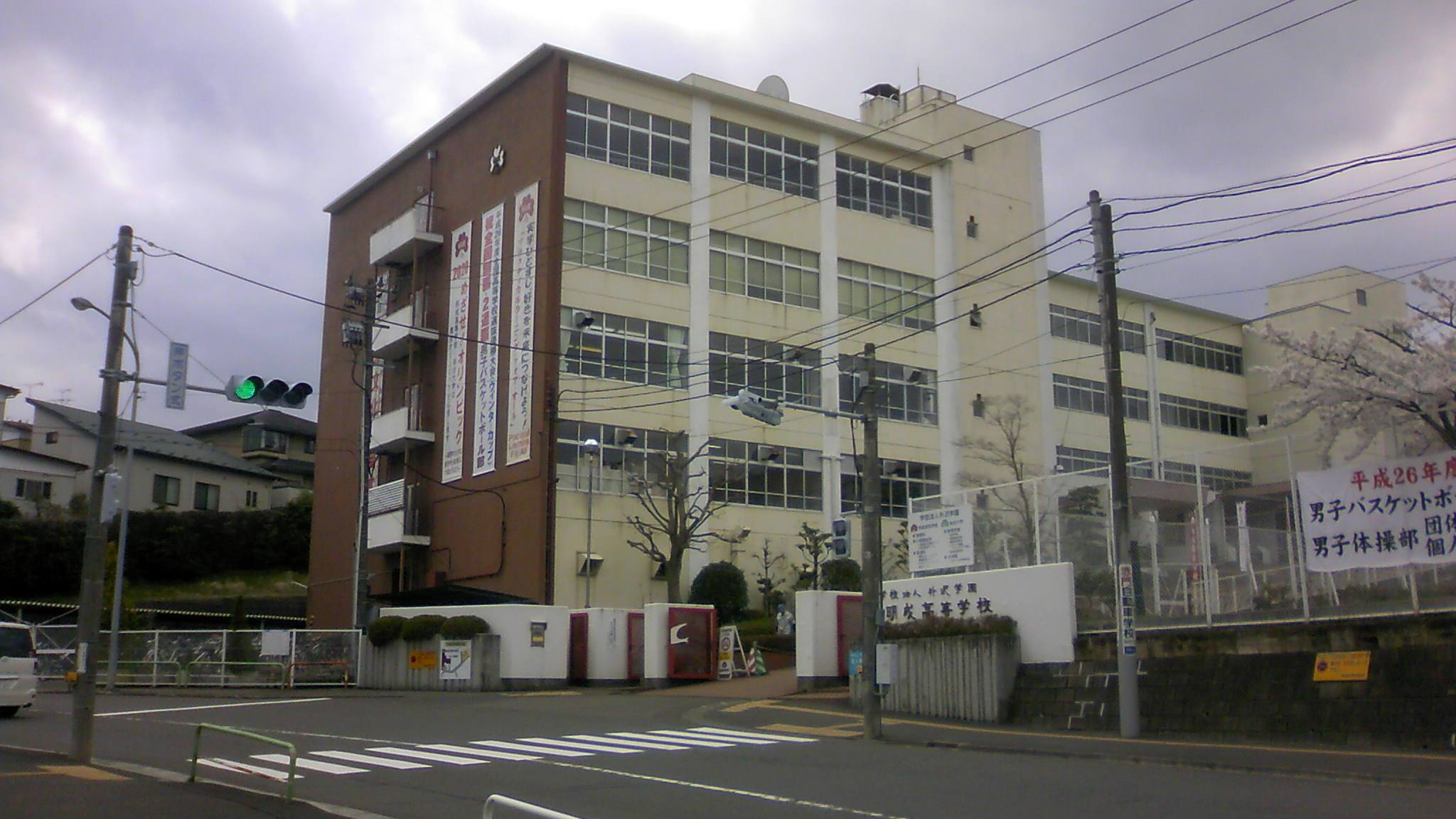

Location
- Sendai, Miyagi, Japan
- Coordinates: 38°18′3.4″N 140°50′36.5″E

Information
- Type: Private
- Established: 1879
- Grades: 10-12
- Affiliation: Sendai University
- Website: http://www.hgm.ed.jp/

Sendai University Meisei High School (仙台大学附属明成高等学校, Sendai Daigaku fuzoku Meisei Kōtōgakkō) is a private high school located in Sendai, Miyagi, Japan. Founded in 1879 as the Shoso Private School, it is the oldest high school in Miyagi Prefecture.

== Notable alumni ==
- Seiya Ando
- Rui Hachimura
- Shunki Hatakeyama
- Kaito Ishikawa
- Takashi Ito
- Shunsuke Motegi
- Kenta Murayama
- Kota Murayama
- Hiroaki Okuno (footballer)
- Fumiya Sato

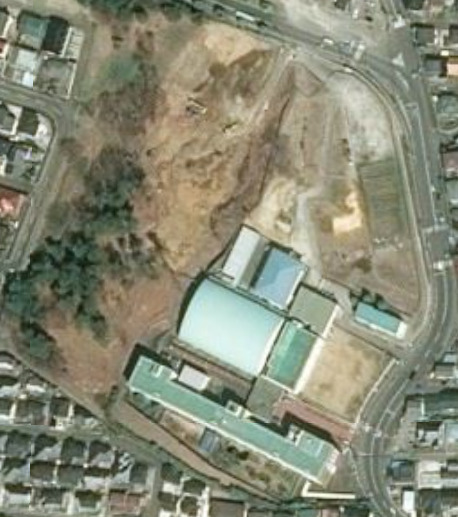
Satellite view

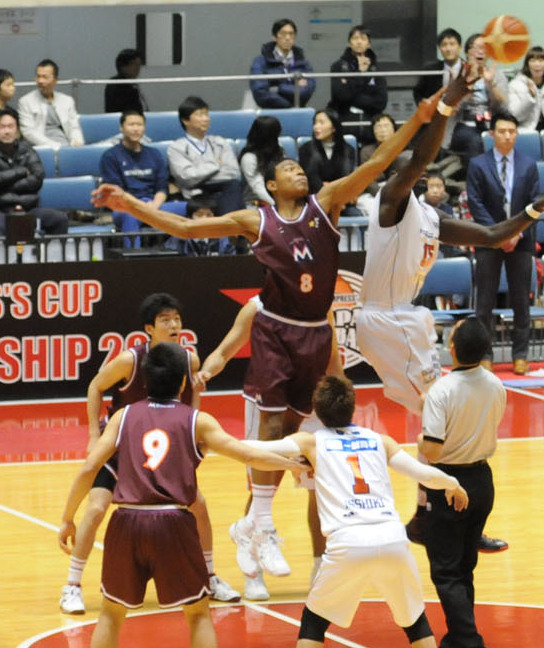
#8 Rui Hachimura
