= Rui Hachimura =

Japanese basketball player (born 1998)

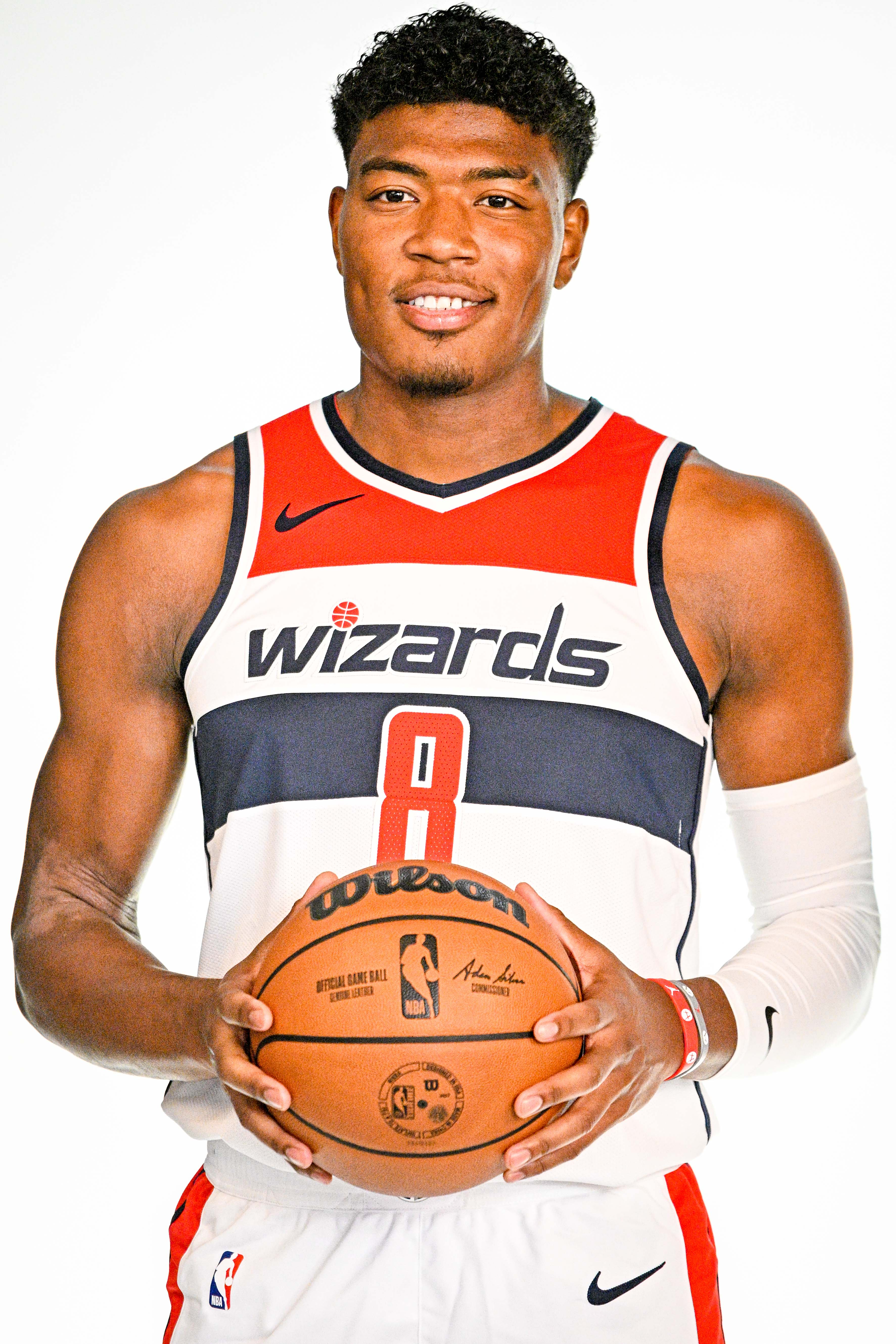
- Hachimura with the Washington Wizards in 2022

No. 28 – Los Angeles Clippers
- Position: Power forward
- League: NBA

Personal information
- Born: February 8, 1998 (age 28) Toyama, Japan
- Listed height: 6 ft 8 in (2.03 m)
- Listed weight: 230 lb (104 kg)

Career information
- High school: Meisei (Sendai, Japan)
- College: Gonzaga (2016–2019)
- NBA draft: 2019: 1st round, 9th overall pick
- Drafted by: Washington Wizards
- Playing career: 2019–present

Career history
- 2019–2023: Washington Wizards
- 2023–2026: Los Angeles Lakers
- 2026–present: Los Angeles Clippers

Career highlights
- NBA All-Rookie Second Team (2020); NBA Cup champion (2023); Consensus first-team All-American (2019); Julius Erving Award (2019); WCC Player of the Year (2019); 2× First-team All-WCC (2018, 2019)
- Stats at NBA.com
- Stats at Basketball Reference
Medals
Men's basketball
Representing Japan
FIBA Asia Under-16 Championship
Bronze medal – third place	2013 Iran	Japan

Rui Hachimura (Japanese: 八村 塁, Hepburn: Hachimura Rui; Japanese: [hatɕiꜜmɯɾa ɾɯꜜi], born February 8, 1998) is a Japanese professional basketball player for the Los Angeles Clippers of the National Basketball Association (NBA). He played college basketball for the Gonzaga Bulldogs and has played for the Japan national team. He plays the power forward position. After being selected ninth overall by the Washington Wizards in the 2019 NBA draft, he was named to the NBA All-Rookie Second Team in 2020.

Born in Toyama Prefecture, Hachimura achieved success at the youth level in Japan, leading Meisei High School to three straight All-Japan High School Tournament titles and being a top player for the Japanese under-17 and under-19 national teams in FIBA competition. He joined Gonzaga in 2016 as the fifth Japanese-born men's NCAA Division I player and in 2017 became the first Japanese national to play in the NCAA Division I men's tournament. As a sophomore, he earned first-team All-WCC honors. He was named a finalist for the Naismith Player of the Year.

== Early life and career ==
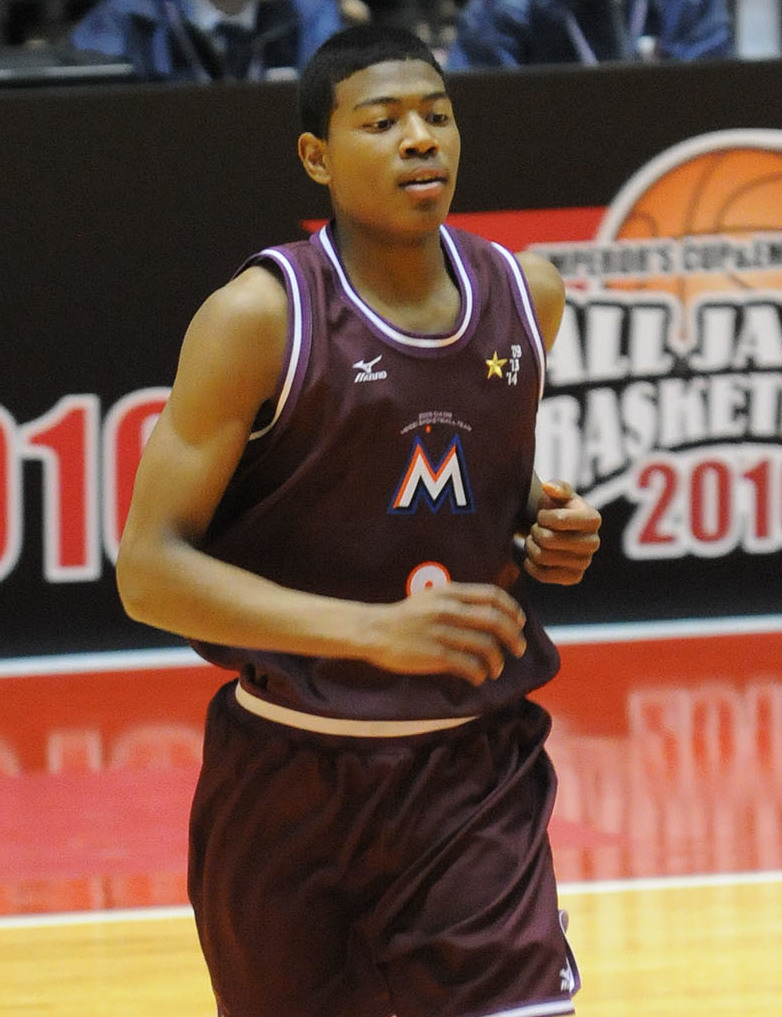
Hachimura with Meisei High School in 2016

Hachimura was born on February 8, 1998, in Toyama Prefecture, Japan, to a Japanese mother, Makiko (麻紀子) and a Beninese father, Zakari Jabil. His given name, Rui (塁), means "base" or "fortress" in Japanese; the name was given to him by his grandfather because he was a big fan of baseball (the character 塁 is also used for "base" in context of baseball). His surname is from his mother's family register. He has three younger siblings—one brother and two sisters. Hachimura's younger brother, Allen, played basketball at Tokai University and is also a professional basketball player for the Kobe Storks of the B.League. In his childhood, he played baseball as a catcher and pitcher. On December 29, 2013, Hachimura led the Meisei High School basketball team to its second title in the All-Japan High School Tournament, scoring 32 points in a 92–78 win over Fukuoka University Ohori. In 2014, he helped his team win the tournament for a second straight year. In April 2015, Hachimura was invited to the Jordan Brand Classic, where he recorded nine points and five rebounds in the International Game.

On November 21, 2015, he signed a National Letter of Intent to play college basketball for the Gonzaga Bulldogs in the US, being considered by ESPN as one of the best international players entering college. On December 29, 2015, Hachimura posted 34 points, 19 rebounds and three blocks to guide Meisei past Tsuchiura Nihon University High School for his third All-Japan Tournament victory.

Despite signing with Gonzaga in the early signing period for 2016, Hachimura's eligibility to play college basketball was called into question. The concerns were that he needed to acclimate better culturally and linguistically to the US and would potentially need to attend a prep school before entering Gonzaga or redshirting if eligible. In February 2016, Hachimura claimed to understand 80 percent of English but speak only 30–40 percent of it. By April 2016, Hachimura was still studying for the SAT to gain entrance to college. In May 2016, Hachimura announced that he met the SAT and GPA requirements to be eligible to play at Gonzaga beginning as early as fall 2016. He planned to play as a true freshman and did not redshirt his first year.

College recruiting
Name	Hometown	School	Height	Weight	Commit date
Rui Hachimura; SF/PF	Toyama, Japan	Meisei	6 ft 8 in (2.03 m)	230 lb (100 kg)	Nov 20, 2015
Rui Hachimura; SF/PF	Recruit ratings: Scout: Rivals: 247Sports: ESPN: (NR)				
Overall recruit ranking: Scout: NR Rivals: NR 247Sports: #136 ESPN: NR
Note: In many cases, Scout, Rivals, 247Sports, On3, and ESPN may conflict in their listings of height and weight.; In these cases, the average was taken. ESPN grades are on a 100-point scale.; Sources: "2016 Gonzaga Rivals Commits". Rivals.; "2016 Gonzaga Scout Commits". Scout.; "2016 Gonzaga ESPN Commits". ESPN.; "Scout.com Team Recruiting Rankings". Scout.; "2016 Team Ranking". Rivals.com.; "2016 Gonzaga 24/7 Sports Commits". 247Sports.

== College career ==
Hachimura made his regular season debut for the Gonzaga Bulldogs on November 11, 2016, against Utah Valley, recording one point and three rebounds in four minutes. As a result, he became the fifth Japanese-born player to ever play NCAA Division I basketball. On December 1, he scored a season-high 10 points in 13 minutes in a 97–63 win over Mississippi Valley State. Hachimura scored eight points on February 23, 2017, against San Diego, helping his team win the West Coast Conference (WCC) title. On March 16, 2017, after playing one minute against South Dakota State, he became the first Japanese native to ever appear in the NCAA Division I men's tournament. Through 28 games as a freshman, Hachimura averaged 2.6 points and 1.4 rebounds while shooting 53 percent from the field in 4.6 minutes per game.

In the 2017–18 campaign, Hachimura appeared in 37 games for Gonzaga, including two starts, averaging 11.6 points and 4.7 rebounds per contest.

Coming into his junior season, Hachimura was named to the Preseason All-WCC Team. He opened the regular season on November 6, 2018, by scoring 33 points in a 120–79 win over Idaho State. On November 21, 2018, Hachimura recorded 20 points, 7 rebounds, and 5 assists to help upset No. 1-ranked Duke in the Maui Invitational finals. Subsequently, he was named most valuable player of the tournament. Hachimura was selected the 2019 WCC Player of the Year. He led Gonzaga in scoring (19.7 points per game) during the 2018–19 season and also averaged 6.5 rebounds a contest.

== Professional career ==
=== Washington Wizards (2019–2023) ===
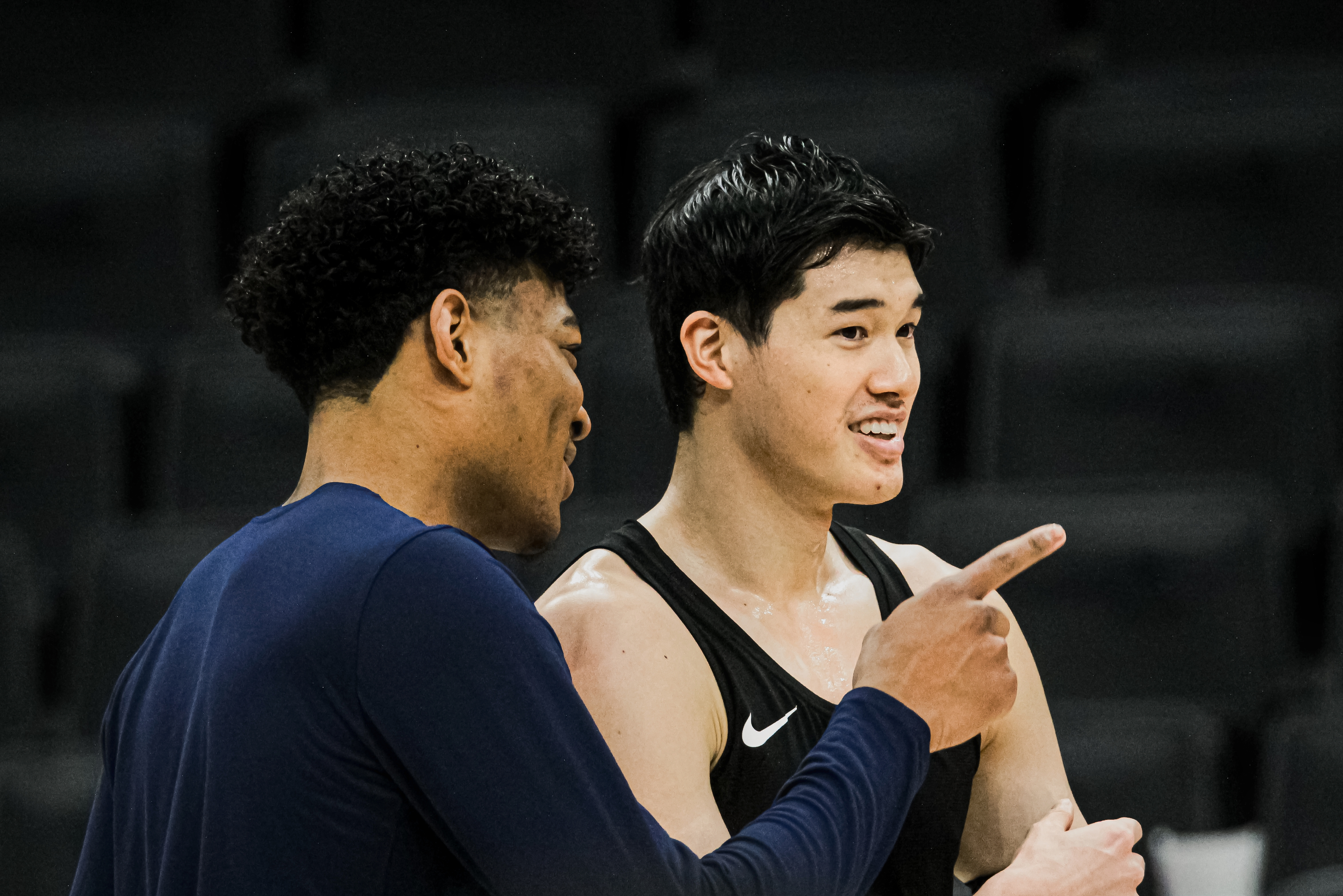
In 2020 with Yuta Watanabe of the Toronto Raptors

On April 15, 2019, Hachimura announced that he would forgo his final year of eligibility and declared for the 2019 NBA draft, where he was drafted ninth overall by the Washington Wizards. Hachimura was the second Japanese-born player to be drafted into the NBA after Yasutaka Okayama, who was drafted 171st overall in the 1981 NBA draft, and also the first Japanese player ever taken in the first round. On October 23, 2019, Hachimura made his NBA debut, posting a double-double (14 points, 10 rebounds) as a starter in a 100–108 loss to the Dallas Mavericks. On December 1, 2019, Hachimura scored a then career-high 30 points in a 125–150 loss to the Los Angeles Clippers along with nine rebounds, three assists and a steal.

In December 2019, he and Yuta Watanabe of the Memphis Grizzlies became the first pair of Japanese players to face each other in the NBA. Hachimura suffered a groin injury against the Detroit Pistons on December 16 and had surgery and missed several games.

On September 15, 2020, Hachimura was named to the NBA All-Rookie Second Team.

On March 30, 2021, Hachimura tied his then career high of 30 points in a 104–114 loss to the Charlotte Hornets. On May 23, he made his playoff debut during the first round, recording 12 points and five rebounds in a 118–125 Game 1 loss to the Philadelphia 76ers. On May 31, Hachimura logged 20 points and a career-high 13 rebounds in a 122–114 Game 4 win. The Wizards ended up losing the series in five games.

On September 25, 2021, the Wizards announced that Hachimura had been excused from the start of training camp for personal reasons. He made his season debut on January 9, 2022, recording six points and three rebounds in a 102–100 win over the Orlando Magic. During the 2021–22 NBA season, Hachimura played 42 games while averaging 11.3 points per game, 3.8 rebounds per game, and 1.1 assists per game. This represented a slight dip in his career averages. However, his three-point shooting improved dramatically: Hachimura's 44.7 percent rate was second only to Luke Kennard (44.9 percent) among NBA players with at least 100 attempts.

On January 21, 2023, in his last game before being traded, Hachimura recorded a then career-high-tying 30 points, alongside five rebounds and two blocks, in a 138–118 win over the Orlando Magic.

=== Los Angeles Lakers (2023–2026) ===
On January 23, 2023, Hachimura was traded to the Los Angeles Lakers in exchange for Kendrick Nunn and three second-round draft picks. Hachimura made his Lakers debut two days later, recording 12 points and six rebounds in a 113–104 win over the San Antonio Spurs.

In the 2023 NBA playoffs, Hachimura was a vital part of the Lakers rotation on both ends of the court. He scored 29 points in his Lakers post-season debut to lead the team to a first-round Game 1 victory over the No. 2-seeded Memphis Grizzlies, and in the Western Conference Finals, was frequently given the defensive assignment of guarding Denver's offensive juggernaut Nikola Jokić, allowing LA's defensive linchpin Anthony Davis more freedom to roam the court as a help defender. Los Angeles would end up losing the series to Denver in 4 games. For the 2022-2023 season, Hachimura averaged 11.2 points, 4.5 rebounds, and shot 48.6% on field goals.

On July 6, 2023, Hachimura re-signed with the Los Angeles Lakers. On December 9, 2023, Hachimura and the Lakers won the inaugural season of the NBA In-Season Tournament (also known as the NBA Cup).

On February 14, 2024, Hachimura set a new career high of 36 points in a 138–122 victory over the Utah Jazz. On March 27, Hachimura put up 32 points on a career-high seven made three-pointers and 10 rebounds in a 136–124 win over the Memphis Grizzlies. For the season, he raised his scoring average to 13.6 ppg while shooting a career high 53.7% on two-point shots and increasing his three-point-percentage 11 points, to 42%.

In 2024–25, Hachimura's scoring average remained steady at 13.1 ppg while his two-point percentage was 50.1% and his three-point percentage was 41.3. The most points he scored in a game during the season was 24, doing so in a 124–117 win over the Indiana Pacers and in a 123–116 loss to the Golden State Warriors on April 3. In a first-round playoff loss to the Minnesota Timberwolves, he scored 14.8 points-per-game while shooting 49.1% on two-pointers and 48.4% on three-pointers.

On December 4, 2025, Hachimura made the first game-winning buzzer-beater of his career. Along the way, he scored 12 points while hitting the three-pointer as time ran out to give the Lakers a 123–120 win over the Toronto Raptors

During the 2025-2026 NBA playoffs, Hachimura had shot the highest 3 point percentage in NBA playoff history. Shooting 51.8% from the 3 point line.

=== Los Angeles Clippers (2026–present) ===
On July 6, 2026, Hachimura officially signed with the Los Angeles Clippers to a two-year, $28 million deal.

== National team career ==
=== Junior national team ===
Hachimura represents Japan internationally. At the 2013 FIBA Asia U16 Championship in Iran, he averaged 22.8 points, 12.6 rebounds and 2.8 blocks through eight contests, guiding his team to a third-place finish. In April 2014, he played the Albert Schweitzer Tournament in Germany with Japan's under 18 national team, finishing in last place.

Japan finished the 2014 FIBA U17 World Championships 14th of 16 teams, with Hachimura scoring a tournament-high 22.6 points per game, while pulling down 6.6 rebounds and blocking 1.7 shots per contest. During the tournament, he scored 25 points against the USA team that went on to win the title; that team included four players who were chosen in the 2017 NBA draft—Jayson Tatum, Josh Jackson, Caleb Swanigan, and Ivan Rabb—plus other future college stars like Diamond Stone and Malik Newman. Hachimura competed for Japan in the 2017 FIBA Under-19 Basketball World Cup, averaging team-bests 20.6 points and 11.0 rebounds a contest.

=== Senior national team ===
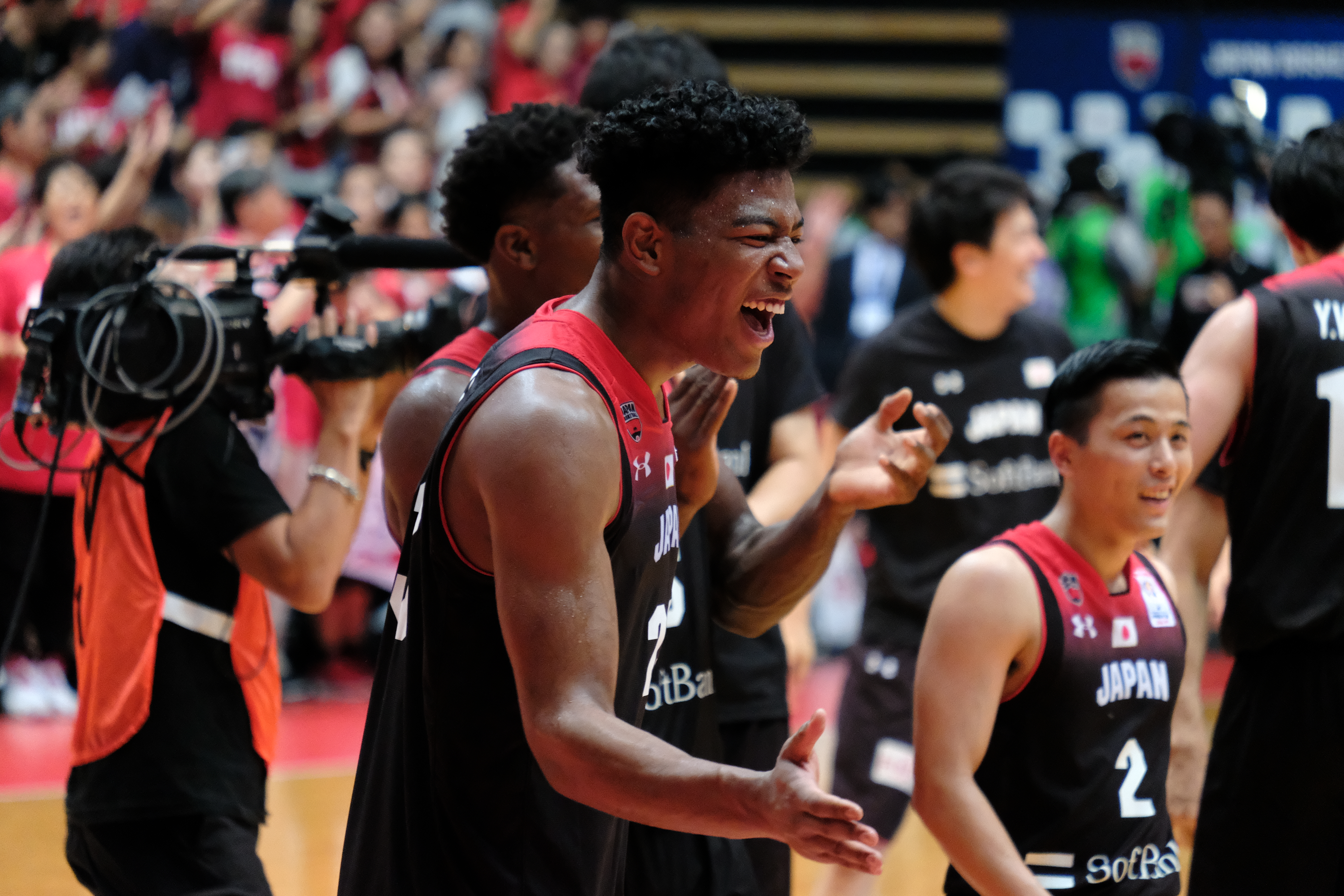
Hachimura after a 2019 FIBA World Cup qualification game with Japan

In a qualification round for the 2019 FIBA Basketball World Cup, Hachimura scored 25 points to help Japan defeat Iran 70–56.

Hachimura scored a game high 34 points in a loss to Slovenia during the preliminary round of the 2020 Olympics in Tokyo.

Hachimura was called up for the 2023 FIBA Basketball World Cup, but ultimately withdrew on 27 June citing exhaustion from the NBA season and playoffs, in which his team had made the Western Conference Finals, and also citing the need to prepare for the following NBA season.

== Career statistics ==
Legend
GP	Games played	GS	Games started	MPG	Minutes per game
FG%	Field goal percentage	3P%	3-point field goal percentage	FT%	Free throw percentage
RPG	Rebounds per game	APG	Assists per game	SPG	Steals per game
BPG	Blocks per game	PPG	Points per game	**Bold**	Career high
‡	NBA record

=== NBA ===
==== Regular season ====
Year	Team	GP	GS	MPG	FG%	3P%	FT%	RPG	APG	SPG	BPG	PPG
2019–20	Washington	48	48	30.1	.466	.287	**.829**	**6.1**	**1.8**	**.8**	.2	13.5
2020–21	Washington	57	**57**	31.5	.478	.328	.770	5.5	1.4	**.8**	.1	**13.8**
2021–22	Washington	42	13	22.5	.491	**.447**	.697	3.8	1.1	.5	.2	11.3
2022–23	Washington	30	0	24.3	.488	.337	.759	4.3	1.2	.4	**.4**	13.0
2022–23	L.A. Lakers	33	9	22.4	.485	.296	.721	4.7	.7	.2	**.4**	9.6
2023–24	L.A. Lakers	**68**	39	26.8	**.537**	.422	.739	4.3	1.2	.6	**.4**	13.6
2024–25	L.A. Lakers	59	**57**	**31.7**	.509	.413	.770	5.0	1.4	**.8**	**.4**	13.1
2025–26	L.A. Lakers	**68**	41	28.3	.514	.443	.694	3.3	.8	.6	.3	11.5
Career		405	264	27.8	.499	.394	.758	4.6	1.2	.6	.3	12.6

==== Playoffs ====
Year	Team	GP	GS	MPG	FG%	3P%	FT%	RPG	APG	SPG	BPG	PPG
2021	Washington	5	5	34.6	**.617**	**.600**	.583	**7.2**	1.0	.4	.2	14.8
2023	L.A. Lakers	**16**	1	24.3	.557	.487	.882	3.6	.6	.5	.3	12.2
2024	L.A. Lakers	5	5	30.5	.395	.357	.500	3.8	.8	.0	.0	7.8
2025	L.A. Lakers	5	5	36.4	.491	.484	**1.000**	4.6	1.0	.6	**.6**	14.8
2026	L.A. Lakers	10	**10**	**38.6**	.549	.569	.727	4.0	**1.7**	**.9**	**.6**	**17.5**
Career		41	26	31.2	.537	.516‡	.765	4.3	1.0	.5	.3	13.6

=== College ===
Year	Team	GP	GS	MPG	FG%	3P%	FT%	RPG	APG	SPG	BPG	PPG
2016–17	Gonzaga	28	0	4.6	.528	.286	.542	1.4	.1	.2	.1	2.6
2017–18	Gonzaga	**37**	2	20.7	.568	.192	**.795**	4.7	.6	.5	.5	11.6
2018–19	Gonzaga	**37**	**37**	**30.2**	**.591**	**.417**	.739	**6.5**	**1.5**	**.9**	**.7**	**19.7**
Career		102	39	19.7	.579	.316	.746	4.4	.8	.6	.5	12.1

== See also ==
- NBA post-season records

Olympic Games
Preceded by Keisuke Ushiro	Flagbearer for Japan (with Yui Susaki); Tokyo 2020	Succeeded by Shigeyuki Nakarai; Misaki Emura
