= Ikuo Kabashima =

Japanese politician

- 蒲島 郁夫

Governor of Kumamoto Prefecture
- In office 16 April 2008 – 15 April 2024
- Monarchs: Akihito; Naruhito
- Preceded by: Yoshiko Shiotani
- Succeeded by: Takashi Kimura

Personal details
- Born: 28 January 1947 (age 79) Kamoto, Kumamoto, Japan
- Party: Independent
- Education: University of Nebraska–Lincoln; Harvard University, HKS

Ikuo Kabashima (蒲島 郁夫, Kabashima Ikuo; born 28 January 1947) is a Japanese politician and a former governor of Kumamoto Prefecture. Kabashima served as governor for 4 terms, between 2008 and 2024.

Ikuo Kabashima received a bachelor's and master's degrees in Animal Science and Agricultural Economics from the University of Nebraska–Lincoln. He received a Ph.D. in political economy from Harvard University, John F. Kennedy School of Government in 1979. He studied under Samuel P. Huntington and Sidney Verba in HKS.

Kabashima was an associate professor at the Institute of Policy and Planning Sciences of the University of Tsukuba from 1986 to 1991. He became a professor in 1991 and in 1996 was named dean of the Graduate School of International Political Economy. In 1997 he became a professor of law at the University of Tokyo.

Kabahsima led the development of Kumamon, a promotional mascot that gained popularity both in Japan and abroad.
