= Takashi Hara (artist) =

Japanese artist

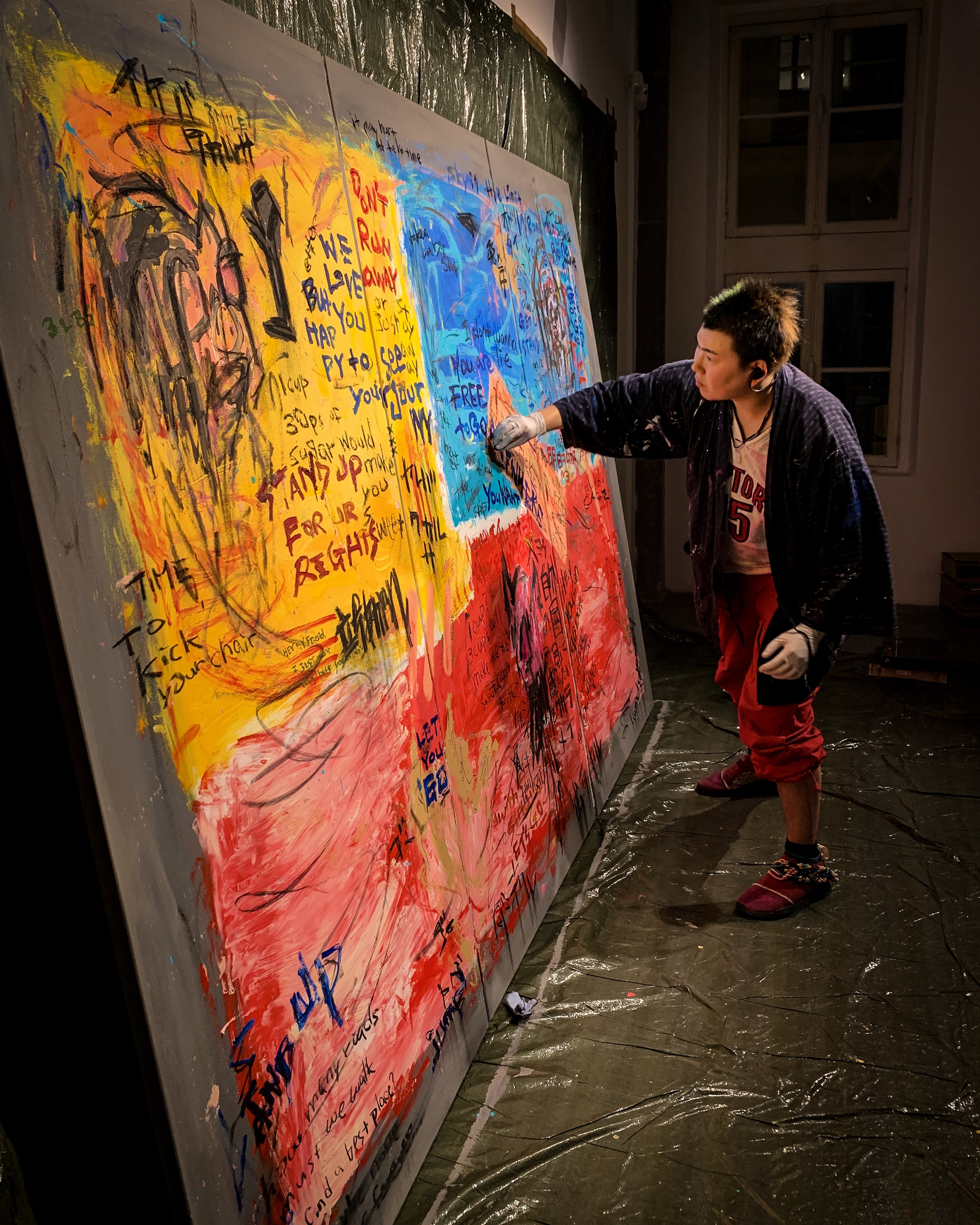
- Takashi Hara in Paris (2020)
- Born: April 14, 1983 (age 43); Tokyo, Japan
- Education: Arizona State University
- Website: www.takashihara.com

Takashi Hara (ハラタカシ, born April 14, 1983) is a Japanese contemporary artist.

Takashi Hara proposes a plastic universe around the figure of the “cochien” (half-pig, half-dog) to question notions of identity, immigration, geography and travel.

By combining the visual arts (sculpture and painting) with music, sound, song and poetry, Takashi Hara stages the multiple identities of living beings inhabited by complex feelings and memories and pays special tribute to the departure of his once musician grandfather.

== Biography ==
He studied the artist Koshin Soeda in Japanese calligraphy in Tokyo later moving on to achieve a Bachelor of Fine Arts Double Major in Painting and Ceramics at the University of Regina, Canada and graduating with Master of Fine Arts in Ceramics at the Arizona State University in 2015. Having successfully produced a number of exhibitions, commercial projects and artist in residencies internationally he now live ad works in his home city Tokyo.

== Exhibitions ==
SOLO EXHIBITIONS

- 2023 - "True Character", K11, Guangzhou, China
- 2022- "Aujourd'hui est le jour", A2Z Art Gallery, Paris, France
- 2022- "Strength of our memories", Nanjo Art Museum, Japan
- 2021 - “Resilience x Cactus x Piano", A2Z Art Gallery, Paris, France
- 2020 - "Cochons la voie ! ", A2Z Art Gallery, Paris, France
- 2019 - "Pig Nation - A story of Humanity", A2Z Art Gallery, Paris, France
- 2019 - “Pig Nation - A story of Humanity”, A2Z Art Gallery, Hong Kong
- 2017 - “ARTAK12”, Arteles Art Center, Haukijärvi, Finland
- 2017 - “ARTAK11 - Taboo City”, Gallery NIW, Tokyo, Japan
- 201 - "ARTAK10 - Indigo Wasabi", Eye Lounge, Phoenix, USA
- 2015 - "ARTAK7 - The nail sticks out gets hammered in", MFA Thesis
- 2015 - “Exhibition Night Gallery”, Tempe, USA
- 2015 - “ARTAK8 - No sense of Wonder”, Eye Lounge, Phoenix, USA
- 2015 - "ARTAK9 - Twisted Mirror", Phoenix Institute of Contemporary Art (phiCA), Phoenix, USA
- 2014 - “Re:valuation”, Night Gallery, Tempe, US
- 2012 - “ARTAK6“, Nouveau Gallery, Regina, Canada
- 2012 - “ARTAK5”, Gallery west, Toronto, Canada
- 2011 - “ARTAK4 - Disports”, 5th Parallel Gallery, Regina, Canada
- 2010 - "ARTAK3", Nasukogen Kaijo, Tochigi, Japan
- 2010 - "ARTAK2 - Kotodama", The Eight-Track Gallery, Regina, Canada
- 2010 - “ARTAK1 – Sneakers”, 5th Parallel Gallery, Regina, Canada

GROUP EXHIBITIONS

- 2019 - “10ans Déjà!”, A2Z Art Gallery, Paris
- 2019 - “8 artistes”, A2Z Art Gallery, Paris
- 2018 - "Interpre8", A2Z Art Gallery, Hong Kong
- 2018 - "Here and Now", Hiroshige Gallery, Tokyo, Japan
- 2016 - “Reverberations”, Print Think Conference, Tyler School, Philadelphia, USA
- 2016 - "Insights", Eye Lounge, Phoenix, États-Unis
- 2015 - "Nostalgia", Eye Lounge, Phoenix, États-Unis
- 2015 - “International Sculpture Conference”, Arizona State University, Tempe, USA
- 2015 - “Small Favors X”, The Clay Studio, Philadelphia, États-Unis
- 2015 - “ACGA 3rd Clay & Glass Biennale”, Brea Art Gallery, Brea, États-Unis
- 2014 - “Soil Horizon”, Harry Wood Gallery, Tempe, USA Zanesvill Prize for Contemporary Ceramics Finalist Exhibition, USA
- 2014 - “Sculpture Exhibition”, Icehouse, Phoenix, USA
- 2014 - “Nathan Cumming Show”, Harry Wood Gallery, Tempe, USA
- 2014 - “Phoenix Studio Tour” by Ceramics Research Centre, Night Gallery, USA
- 2013 - “MFA Summer Juried Show”, Harry Wood Gallery, Tempe, USA
- 2012 - “New Graduate Exhibition”, Harry Wood Gallery, Tempe, USA
- 2011 - “Seasonal Exhibitions”, Nouveau Gallery, Regina, Canada
- 20111 - “APAN RELEIF ~ART SUMMIT IN REGINA~”, The Freehouse, Regina, Canada
- 2010 - “Genre Updated”, 5th Parallel Gallery, Regina, Canada
- 2010 - “Rock Paper Scissors”, 5th Parallel Gallery, Regina, Canada
- 2010 - “Introspective (BFA Graduation Exhibition”), Mackenzie Art Gallery, Regina
- 2009 - “1000 Miles Apart”, The Gallery of Alberta College of Art+Design, Calgary, Canada
- 2009 - “Queen City Comic Show”, 5th Parallel Gallery, Regina, Canada
- 2008 - “Interim”, 5th Parallel Gallery, Regina, Canada
- 2018 - “1000 Miles Apart”, 5th Parallel Gallery, Regina, Canada

ART FAIRS

- 2024 - Art Paris, Paris, France
- 2024 - Art Central, Hong Kong
- 2023 - Asia Now, Paris, France
- 2022 - ART021, Paris, France
- 2022 - Asia Now, Paris, France
- 2021 - ART021, Shanghai
- 2021 - Asia Now, A2Z Art Gallery, Paris, France
- 2021 - Jingart 2021, Platform
- 2020 - Collecte de fonds HKAGA 2020 à Art Basel, Hong Kong
