= Takashi Ito (basketball) =

Japanese basketball player

Takashi Ito 伊藤駿
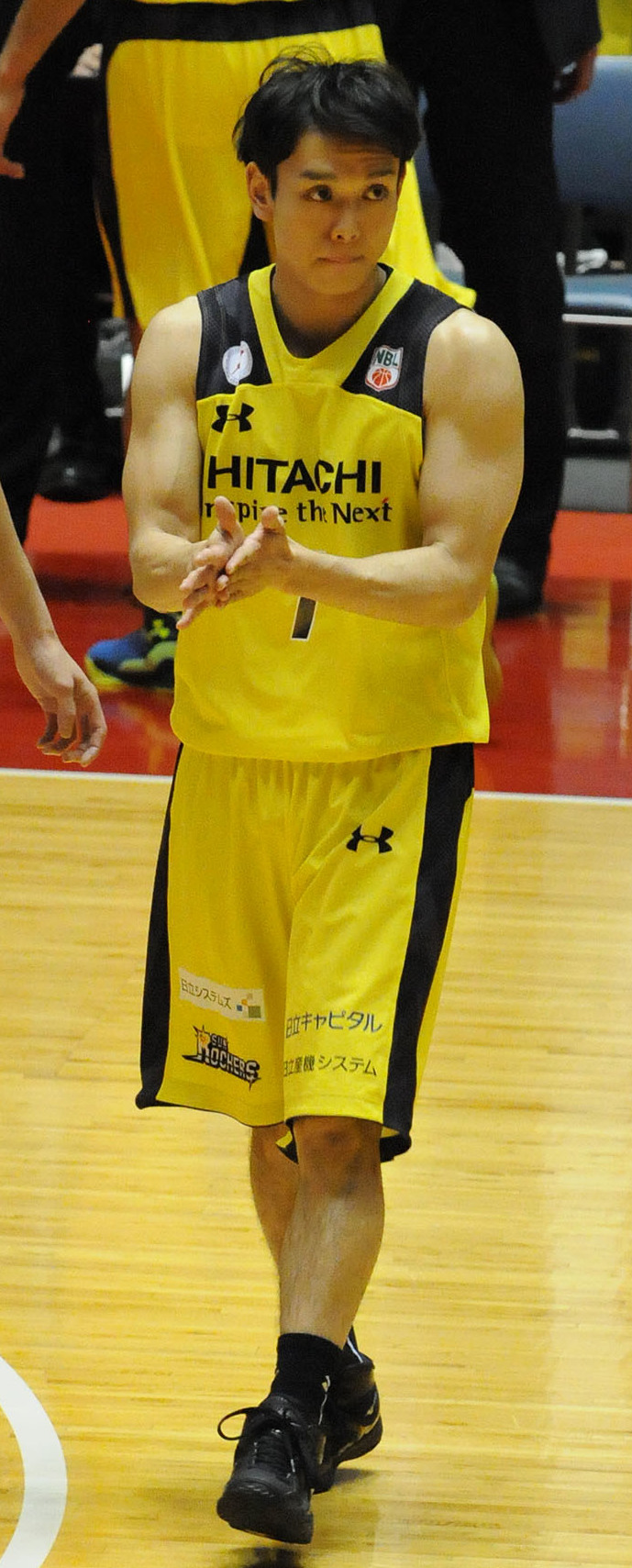
- Ito in 2015

No. 16 – Toyama Grouses
- Position: Point guard / shooting guard
- League: B.League

Personal information
- Born: February 14, 1990 (age 36) Sendai, Miyagi, Japan
- Listed height: 5 ft 8.5 in (1.74 m)
- Listed weight: 165 lb (75 kg)

Career information
- High school: Meisei (Sendai, Miyagi)
- College: Aoyama Gakuin University
- Playing career: 2012–present

Career history
- 2012–2019: Hitachi Sun Rockers
- 2019-2023: Akita Northern Happinets
- 2023-: Toyama Grouses

Career highlights

Takashi Ito (born February 14, 1990) is a Japanese professional basketball player who plays for the Toyama Grouses of the B.League in Japan. He played college basketball for Aoyama Gakuin University.

== Career statistics ==
Legend
GP	Games played	GS	Games started	MPG	Minutes per game
FG%	Field goal percentage	3P%	3-point field goal percentage	FT%	Free throw percentage
RPG	Rebounds per game	APG	Assists per game	SPG	Steals per game
BPG	Blocks per game	PPG	Points per game	**Bold**	Career high

=== Regular season ===
Year	Team	GP	GS	MPG	FG%	3P%	FT%	RPG	APG	SPG	BPG	PPG
2012-13	Hitachi	30	1	6.2	.368	.471	.500	0.5	0.4	0.1	0.0	1.3
2013-14	Hitachi	44	4	11.4	.216	.062	.688	0.7	1.0	0.5	0.0	1.0
2014-15	Hitachi	45	2	9.9	.327	.292	.733	0.9	0.6	0.4	0.0	2.0
2015-16	Hitachi	52	3	16.2	.333	.273	.556	1.4	1.2	0.7	0.0	2.3
2016-17	Shibuya	46	30	24.5	.425	.284	.730	2.1	2.6	0.8	0.1	7.3
2017-18	Shibuya	47	35	21.5	.360	.293	.800	1.8	2.2	0.9	0.0	4.7
2018-19	Shibuya	53	39	18.8	.376	.289	.789	1.7	2.3	0.3	0.0	2.9
2019-20	Akita	37	25	18.9	.309	.185	.739	1.8	3.1	0.7	0.0	2.4
2020-21	Akita	36	6	13.7	.394	.353	.733	1.6	2.4	0.9	0.0	3.5

=== Playoffs ===
Year	Team	GP	GS	MPG	FG%	3P%	FT%	RPG	APG	SPG	BPG	PPG
2012-13	Hitachi	2		10.0	.400	.000	.000	1.0	0.0	0.0	0.0	2.0
2014-15	Hitachi	5		13.0	.353	.400	.000	1.4	0.6	0.4	0.0	3.2
2015-16	Hitachi	2		13.5	.000	.000	.000	1.5	0.5	1.0	0.0	0.0
2016-17	Shibuya	2	0	22:38	.545	.250	.000	1.0	1.5	0.5	0	6.5

=== Early cup games ===
Year	Team	GP	GS	MPG	FG%	3P%	FT%	RPG	APG	SPG	BPG	PPG
2017	Shibuya	2	2	14:18	.833	.667	.333	1.0	1.5	1.0	0.0	6.5
2018	Shibuya	3	0	20:33	.214	.200	.000	0.7	2.3	2.0	0.0	2.3
2019	Akita	2	1	21:51	.300	.000	1.000	2.0	6.0	2.5	0.0	4.0

=== Preseason games ===
Year	Team	GP	GS	MPG	FG%	3P%	FT%	RPG	APG	SPG	BPG	PPG
2019	Akita	3	2	18.4	.273	.500	.500	1.3	2.0	0.7	0.0	2.67

Source: UtsunomiyaToyamaSendai
