= Takaya (name) =

Takaya is both a Japanese surname and a masculine Japanese given name. Notable people with the name include:

== As surname ==
- Hiroyuki Takaya (高谷 裕之, born 1977), a Japanese mixed martial artist
- Natsuki Takaya (高屋 奈月, born 1973), the pen name of a Japanese manga artist best known for creating the series Fruits Basket
- Yoshiki Takaya (高屋 良樹, born 1960), a Japanese manga artist best known for creating the series Guyver

== As given name ==
- Takaya Imamura, co-director of the Nintendo 3DS game Tank Troopers
- Takaya Ishikawa (石川 昂弥, born 2001), Japanese baseball player
- Takaya Kamikawa (上川 隆也, born 1965), a Japanese actor
- Kotofuji Takaya (琴富士 孝也, born 1964, as Takaya Kobayashi), a former Japanese sumo wrestler
- Takaya Kuroda (黒田 崇矢, born 1965), a Japanese actor and voice actor
- Takaya Kurokawa (黒河 貴矢, born 1981), a retired Japanese football player who last played for Albirex Niigata and who was part of the Japanese 2004 Olympic football team
- Takaya Osanai (小山内 貴哉, born 1993), Japanese footballer
- Takaya Tsubobayashi (坪林隆也, born 1971), a Japanese race car driver

== Fictional characters ==
- Takaya Aiba, the main character of the anime series Tekkaman Blade (released as Teknoman in the United States and Australia, with the character's name changed to "Nick Carter")
- Takaya Mizushima, a character in the manga and anime series Shadow Star (known as Narutaru in Japan)
- Takaya Sakaki, an antagonist in Persona 3
- Noriko Takaya, one of the main female character of Gainax series Gunbuster
