= Takanobu =

- Gender: Male

Origin
- Origin: Japanese
- Meaning: Different meanings depending on the kanji used

Takanobu is a masculine Japanese given name. Notable people with the name include:

- Fujiwara Takanobu (1142–1205), Japanese portrait artist
- Takanobu Iwazaki (岩崎 宇信; born 1975), Japanese weightlifter
- Matsura Takanobu (1529–1599), Japanese samurai
- Ryūzōji Takanobu (1530–1584), Japanese daimyō
- Takanobu Hayashi, Japanese photographer
- Takanobu Ito (伊東 孝紳; born 1953), Japanese businessman
- Takanobu Jumonji (born 1975), Japanese cyclist
- Takanobu Komiyama (born 1984), Japanese footballer
- Mitani Takanobu (1892-1985), Japanese government official
- Takanobu Okabe (born 1970), Japanese ski jumper
- Takanobu Otsubo (born 1976), Japanese long-distance runner
- Takakeisho, real name Takanobu Satō (born 1996), Japanese sumo wrestler
- Takanobu Takahashi (高橋 孝信; born 1951), Japanese academic and translator
