= Takami =

Takami is both a Japanese surname and a given name. Notable people with the name include:

== Given name ==
- Takami Akai (赤井 孝美; born 1961), Japanese illustrator, game creator, character designer and animator
- Takami Eto (江藤 隆美) (1925–2007), Japanese politician
- Takami Itō (伊藤 たかみ; born 1971), Japanese author
- Takami Ominami (大南 敬美; born 1975), Japanese long-distance runner
- Takami Yoshimoto (吉本 多香美; born 1971), Japanese actress

== Surname ==
- Hiroaki Takami (高見 公明; born 1960), Japanese boxer
- Hiroyuki Takami (貴水 博之; born 1969), Japanese singer and actor
- Joseph Mitsuaki Takami (高見 三明; born 1946), Japanese Roman Catholic prelate
- Jun Takami (高見 順; 1907–1965), Japanese novelist and poet
- Kazuhiro Takami (高見 和宏; born 1959), Japanese professional golfer
- Koushun Takami (高見 広春; born 1969), Japanese author and journalist
- Taichi Takami (髙見 泰地; born 1993), Japanese professional shogi player
- Toshihiro Takami (高見 敏弘; born 1925), founder of the Asian Rural Institute (ARI) in Japan
- Toyoko Takami (born 1945), Japanese composer and music educator
- Yasunori Takami (高見 泰範; born 1964), Japanese baseball player

=== Fictional characters ===
- Chika Takami (高海 千歌), fictional character from the media-mix project Love Live! Sunshine!!
- Yoh and Minatsuki Takami (鷹見 羊 and 鷹見 水名月), fictional siblings from the anime Deadman Wonderland
- Keigo Takami (鷹見 啓悟), a fictional character from My Hero Academia

== See also ==
- Mount Takami
- Takami Dam, dam in Hokkaidō, Japan
