= Takashi Kimura (politician) =

Japanese politician (born 1974)

- 木村 敬
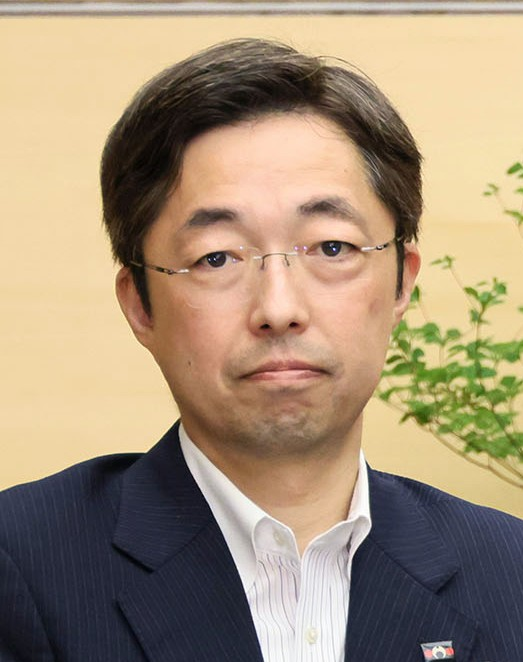
- Kimura in 2024

Governor of Kumamoto Prefecture
- Incumbent
- Assumed office April 16, 2024
- Monarch: Naruhito
- Preceded by: Ikuo Kabashima

Vice-governor of Kumamoto Prefecture
- In office October 9, 2020 – January 9, 2024
- Governor: Ikuo Kabashima

Personal details
- Born: May 21, 1974 (age 52) Tokyo, Japan
- Party: Independent
- Education: University of Tokyo

Takashi Kimura (Japanese: 木村 敬, Hepburn: Kimura Takashi; born May 21, 1974) is a Japanese politician. He currently serves as the governor of Kumamoto Prefecture since 2024. He previously served as the vice governor of Kumamoto from 2020 to 2024.

== Biography ==
Kimura was born on May 21, 1974 in Tokyo. He was born without his left hand after being entangled by his umbilical cord in the womb. As a child, he admired baseball pitcher Jim Abbott because he was also missing a hand (his right). In 1987, he entered a private boys' school where he studied middle and high school. He entered the University of Tokyo, Faculty of Law in 1994. He met Ikuo Kabashima, then professor at the University of Tokyo, when he was in his third year. In 1999, he joined the Ministry of Home Affairs and was assigned to Okayama Prefecture, this is where he also met his wife whom he married three years later. In 2004, he was assigned to Tottori Prefecture, where he used manga to develop the community, citing that he was inspired by manga artist Shigeru Mizuki.

He worked in various ministries, such as being the director of the Public Enterprise Division of the Ministry of Internal Affairs and Communications in 2016, as well as providing support for the victims of the 2016 Kumamoto earthquake. He became the vice governor of Kumamoto on October 9, 2020 until resigning on January 8, 2024. The next day, he retired from the Ministry of Internal Affairs and Communications, and announced he would be running for governor of Kumamoto Prefecture in the 2024 gubernatorial election. He was endorsed by the Liberal Democratic Party (LDP). He won the election, beating Kumamoto City mayor Masashi Koyama.

On May 1, 2024, it was revealed that he donated potted moth orchids to various acquaintances and medical facilities in Kumamoto City right after winning the election in March, which is illegal under the Public Offices Election Act. He defended himself stating that he was only depositing them, and he would retrieve them after moving into the governor's residence, adding that he felt bad throwing them away because his house is too small for them. He said on a press conference on May 10 that the recipients had "agreed to give them all back" and that two of the plants were already returned to him.
