= Takaya =

Japanese electronics company

Takaya Corporation is an electronics equipment manufacturer in Okayama prefecture, Japan. The company was originally established as a textile company in 1918, and began assembling transistor radios in 1966. In 1977, Takaya and Sharp Corporation jointly established Sharp Takaya Electronics Co., Ltd.

== Description ==
Some products have been sold directly to original equipment manufacturers under the Takaya brand. One of the many testers still in daily use is the APT-8300 fixtureless tester, a three-axis flying probe tester.
