= Takashi Ikenoue =

Japanese handball player (born 1955)

Takashi Ikenoue (池ノ上 孝司, Ikenoue Takashi; born 29 September 1955) is a Japanese former handball player who competed in the 1984 Summer Olympics.
