= Takashi Kimura (water polo) =

Japanese water polo player

Personal information
- Born: March 24, 1950 (age 75)

Sport
- Sport: Water polo

Takashi Kimura (木村 隆, Kimura Takashi, born 24 March 1950) is a Japanese former water polo player who competed in the 1972 Summer Olympics.
