= Takashi Kanezawa =

Japanese shogi player

- Native name: 金沢孝史
- Born: May 13, 1973 (age 52)
- Hometown: Sapporo
- Nationality: Japanese

Career
- Achieved professional status: April 1, 1999 (aged 25)
- Badge Number: 232
- Rank: 5-dan
- Retired: May 17, 2021 (aged 48)
- Teacher: Osamu Katsuura (9-dan)

Websites
- JSA profile page

Takashi Kanezawa (金沢 孝史, Kanezawa Takashi; May 13, 1973) is a Japanese retired professional shogi player who achieved the rank of 6-dan.

== Shogi professional ==
=== Promotion history ===
The promotion history for Kanezawa was as follows:

- 6-kyū: 1985
- 1-dan: 1987
- 4-dan: April 1, 1999
- 5-dan: July 10, 2006
- Retired: May 17, 2021
- 6-dan: April 1, 2023
