= Tracy Yardley =

American comic book artist

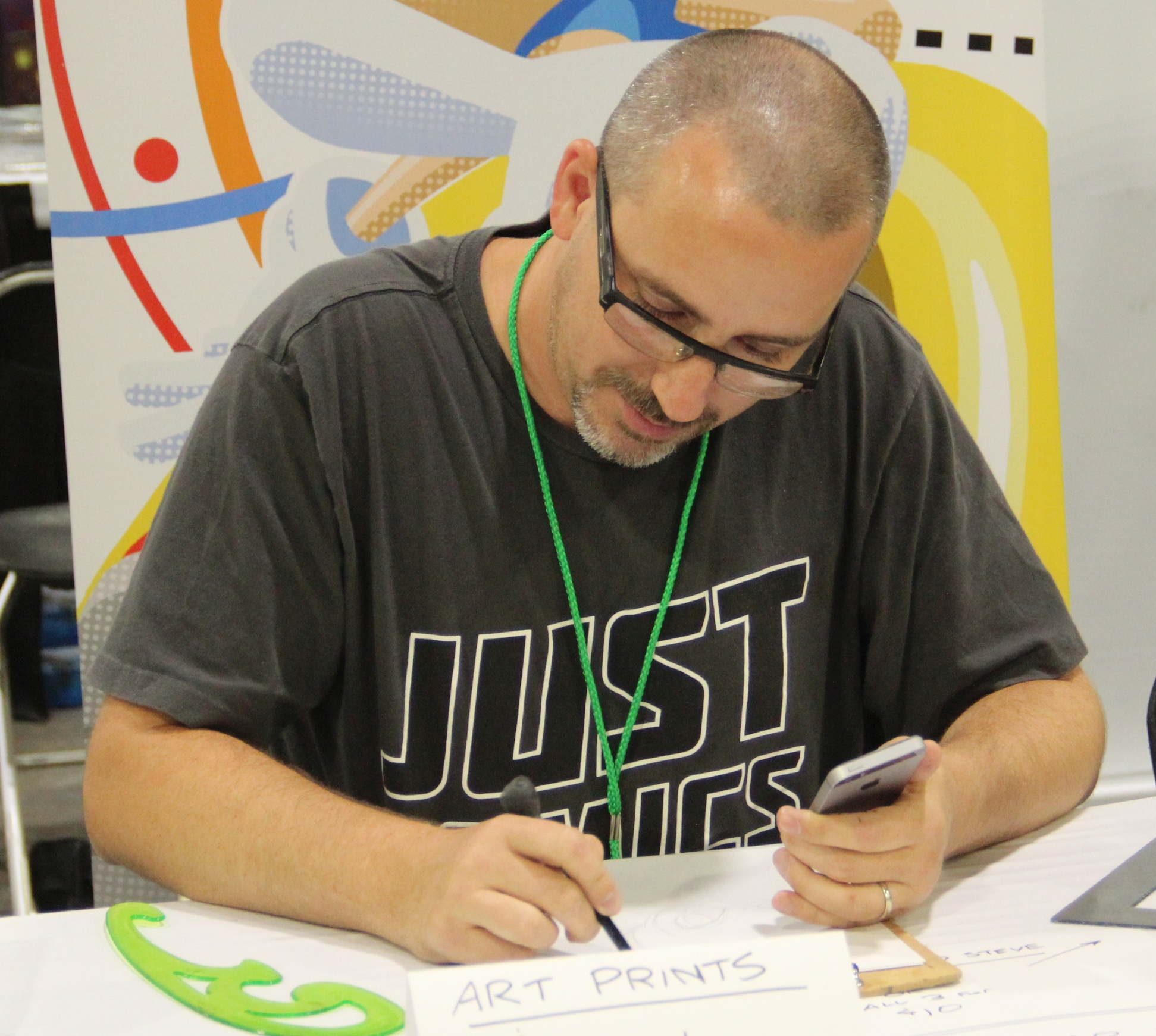
- Yardley in 2018
- Born: Tracy Yardley Southern Illinois, U.S.
- Areas: Penciler, Inker, Writer, Colorist
- Notable works: Sonic the Hedgehog; Sonic Universe; Mega Man

Tracy Yardley is an American comic book artist best known for his work with the Sonic the Hedgehog comics, originally published by Archie Comics.

== Career ==
=== Sonic the Hedgehog comics ===
Yardley has been greatly interested in comics for most of his life, as well as the Sonic the Hedgehog video game series. He grew up reading the earliest issues of Archie Comics' officially licensed Sonic the Hedgehog comic book series. He professionally spells his name with an "!" at the end as a tribute to Scott Shaw, who also spelled his name the same way. Scott Shaw was one of the first artists who worked on Archie Comics' Sonic the Hedgehog series.

Yardley worked mainly as a penciller on Archie Comics' Sonic the Hedgehog series from 2006 until Sega of America's termination of Archie Comics' license in 2017. Yardley also occasionally worked on the spin-off comic Sonic X, and served as the main artist for the side-series Sonic Universe. After IDW Publishing picked up the Sonic the Hedgehog license, the company confirmed Yardley as one of the pencillers for their own Sonic the Hedgehog comic book series, which started circulation in April 2018.

He and Ian Flynn collaborated closely on the Sonic the Hedgehog series during the Archie Comics years, sometimes himself writing script for the series. He has even inked and occasionally colored a few issues. The collaboration has continued for IDW Publishing's series.

=== Other works ===
Although Sega canceled their Sonic the Hedgehog comic series, Archie Comics brought back Yardley, alongside colleagues Ian Flynn and Matt Herms, to revive their Cosmo the Merry Martian intellectual property. The first issue of Cosmo the Mighty Martian was released in January 2018.

Yardley worked as the main penciler/inker of an original manga-like series known as Riding Shotgun, published by Tokyopop. Riding Shotgun ended after two volumes, though Yardley still had ideas for a third volume.

One of Yardley's first known, original comics was a series known as Nate and Steve, on which he worked with three of his friends.

Yardley has recently illustrated on a graphic novel starring Felix the Cat written by Mike Federali and Bob Frantz which was released in November 7, 2023 by Rocketship. He also contributed to some card illustrations for a Magic: The Gathering crossover with Sonic.

== Bibliography ==
=== Archie Comics ===
- Cosmo (2018) #1-5
- Cosmo The Mighty Martian #1-5
- Mega Man (Archie) #26
- Sonic Boom (Archie) #8
- Sonic the Hedgehog (Archie) #160-186, 189-193, 195-201, 208-209, 212, 217, 219, 225-229, 235-237, 249-250, 253-254, 256, 259, 262, 273, 287-290
- Sonic Universe #1-32, 33-36 (As writer and artist) 41-50, 52-53, 55-58 (As writer and artist), 63-75, 79-84
- Sonic X (Archie) #5-6, 10-11, 19, 23, 24 (As writer and artist), 25, 28-29 (As writer), 31, 32, 35 (cover)

=== IDW Publishing ===
- Sonic the Hedgehog (IDW) #1, 5-6, 9, 10 (Lineart, cover B), 12, 14, 17-18, 42, 44
- Sonic the Hedgehog: Endless Summer (cover A and RI (10) and Layouts)
- Sonic The Hedgehog #1: 5th Anniversary Edition (Cover B, five-page story: “Familiar Territory”)
- Sonic the Hedgehog 2: The Official Movie Pre-Quill ("The Secret Of My Distress" and "Mushroom With A View")
- Sonic the Hedgehog 30th Anniversary Special ("Seasons of Chaos") (p. 36, 60)
- Sonic the Hedgehog: Chaotix's 30th Anniversary Special (p. 1-3, 9-11, 17-19, 23-30)

=== Other publishers ===
- Riding Shotgun #1-2 (Tokyopop)
- Felix the Cat (graphic novel) (Rocketship Entertainment)

=== Cover work ===
- Jughead: The Hunger #10 (cover C)
- Jughead's Time Police #1 (cover E)
- Hero Cats #14 (Action Lab)
- Sonic Super Digest #1-2, 9
- Sonic the Hedgehog Free Comic Book Day (Archie) 2009, 2010-2011, 2014
- Sonic the Hedgehog (IDW) #20 (cover A), 23 (cover B), 31-32 (cover A), 40 (cover A), 54 (cover A), 58 (cover A), 75 (cover 1:25), Annual 2020 (cover RI), 2022 (convention exclusive cover)
- Sonic the Hedgehog Free Comic Book Day (IDW) 2021
- Sonic the Hedgehog: Tails 30th Anniversary Special (cover RI)
- Sonic the Hedgehog's 900th Adventure (cover A)
- Sonic: Worlds Unite Battles #1 (cover D)
- Sonic the Hedgehog: On the Go Vol. 1-2
- Sonic the Hedgehog Boxset, Vol. 1-3 (IDW exclusive cover)
