= Patrick Spaziante =

American comic artist and illustrator

Patrick Spaziante, also known as Spaz, is an American comic book artist known for his work for Archie Comics, in particular his interior pencil and cover work for Sonic the Hedgehog, Sonic X and Sonic Universe. He is also known for his work on Dreamwave Productions' Teenage Mutant Ninja Turtles, Nickelodeon Comics' Avatar: The Last Airbender and Marvel Comics' Muties, as well as his illustration work for Simon & Schuster's children books.

== Career ==
Spaziante was a member of a group along with Ken Penders and Steven Butler known collectively as "Team Sonic" (not to be confused with "Sonic Team", the original creators of the SEGA franchise), because of their extensive work on the series. The trio interviewed with Offenberger as they approached the 150th edition of the Sonic the Hedgehog series. In the interview, Spaz talked about the early years he spent as an up-and-coming comic book artist with Archie Comics and what it was like to work his way up.

The first comic he is credited for designing the cover art for was Sonic the Hedgehog #21 (April 1995). Spaziante also worked on Sonic the Hedgehog #25 (August 1995), which was adapted directly from Sonic CD, released two years prior to the release of that comic.

Spaziante's other works include Mega Man and Transformers for Dreamwave Productions' Teenage Mutant Ninja Turtles, the miniseries Muties for Marvel Comics, and Avatar: The Last Airbender for Nickelodeon Comics, which was based on the television series of the same name.

Spaziante has also worked on children's books for Simon & Schuster, in particular the Olivia series and the Avatar book Journeys Through the Earth Kingdom.

=== Critical reception ===
Rafael Gaitan, reviewing Mega Man #2 for Comics Bulletin, found Spaziante's pencils to be "clean and tight", lauding them for accurately capturing the video game's look, and manga-inspired action style. Comics Bulletin's Penny Kenny, reviewing Mega Man Volume 1: Let the Games Begin trade paperback, called that book's artwork "dynamic and expressive", praising the clarity of its sequences.

== Bibliography ==
- Mega Man (Archie) #1-4, 9-12 (Short Circuits), 34-35
- Mega Man (Dreamwave Productions) #4
- Nights into Dreams #1, 3-6
- Sonic & Knuckles: Mecha Madness Special
- Sonic Super Special #6, 11, 15
- Sonic the Hedgehog (Archie) #21-22, 25, 30, 39-41, 43, 50, 59, 82, 98, 110, 115, 161, 171, 226-227
- Sonic X (Archie) #16-17, 23, 25-27, 30-32, 34-35, 37-40
- What If? Fallen Son (What if the Runaways Became the Young Avengers? story)
- What If? House of M (What if the Runaways Became the Young Avengers? story)
- What If? Newer Fantastic Four (What if the Runaways Became the Young Avengers? story)
- What If? Secret Wars (What if the Runaways Became the Young Avengers? story)
- What If? - Spider-Man: Back in Black (What if the Runaways Became the Young Avengers? story)
- What If? World War Hulk

=== Cover work ===
- Mega Man (Archie) #1-4, 5 (variant cover), 6-10, 12-14, 16, 24-27, 29-32, 33 (variant cover), 34-47, 50-51, 54-55
- Knuckles #1-3
- Knuckles' Chaotix
- Knuckles the Echidna #1-25
- Sonic & Knuckles
- Sonic Blast
- Sonic the Hedgehog Free Comic Book Day (Archie) 2007-2008
- Sonic the Hedgehog 30th Anniversary Special (cover RI-A)
- Sonic Boom (Archie) #1-2, 5, 8-10
- Sonic Quest #1-3
- Sonic the Hedgehog Triple Trouble
- Sonic Universe #1, 25, 50-55, 75-78
- Sonic the Hedgehog: The Complete Sonic Comic Encyclopedia
- Sonic X (Archie) #1-23, 25-40
- Super Sonic vs. Hyper Knuckles
- Tails #1-3
