= Astal =

1995 video game

- North American cover art
- Developer: Sega
- Publisher: Sega
- Producer: Makoto Oshitani
- Designers: Tsuyoshi Sugai; Masahito Shimizu
- Artist: Mika Okada
- Writers: Motomu Hayashi; Toshiyasu Kamiko
- Composers: Tatsuyuki Maeda; Tatsuya Kousaki
- Platform: Sega Saturn
- Release: JP: April 28, 1995; NA: September 27, 1995
- Genre: Platform
- Modes: Single-player, multiplayer

Astal (Note: known in Japan as Kisuishou Densetsu Astal (輝水晶伝説 アスタル; lit. "Shining Crystal Legend Astal")) is a 1995 platform video game developed and published by Sega for the Sega Saturn. It was released early in the Sega Saturn's life and used hand-drawn graphics. The animations for the cutscenes were provided by Tokyo Movie Shinsha.

== Gameplay ==
Astal is a 2D side-scrolling platform game. The player must guide the title character through the course of a level while avoiding or eliminating obstacles and opposing forces. In addition to running and jumping, different button combinations allow for punching or throwing enemies. The ground can be punched to stun opposing enemies nearby, and a blowing attack can be charged by inhaling and exhaling, which blows enemies or obstacles away from the character. Certain parts of the level's environment, such as trees or rocks, can also be picked up and thrown. Defeating special glowing enemies charges up a meter that allows for the use of a bird character who assists the player. A limited asymmetrical co-op mode includes a second player controlling the bird characters action, which includes wing attacks and divebombing.

The game is divided into five themed worlds, featuring environments ranging from forests and underwater landscapes to volcanic regions. Stages incorporate changes in scenery, environmental obstacles and visual effects that alter the presentation of the game's side-scrolling action.

== Plot ==
Somewhere in the universe, the Goddess Antowas created a world from a single jewel. On this world, Quartalia, she created the earth, water, sky and air. To inhabit this world, she created two humans: from a green jewel, a girl, Leda, who has the power to make things live on Quartalia; and from a red Jewel, a boy, Astal, whose purpose was to protect Leda. Content with her creation, Antowas slept.

While she slept, the evil Jerado tried to take over Quartalia. To ensure victory, Jerado created a warrior: Geist. Geist kidnapped Leda, and held her at the bottom of the ocean. In an effort to get her back, Astal tore Quartalia apart, awakening Antowas. As punishment, Antowas banished Astal to Quartalia's moon. Leda took pity on Astal, and gave him her jewel. Once Astal and Jerado were dealt with, Antowas went back to sleep.

However, Geist was still free, and Quartalia was not restored from the changes Jerado wrought. From his prison on the moon, Astal witnessed Geist kidnap Leda again. Consumed with the need to protect her, he freed himself and returned to Quartalia. Now Astal journeys in search of Leda through a Quartalia transformed by Jerado's dark design, along with a strange bird who for some reason just won't leave him alone...

== Development ==
Astal was developed internally by Sega for the Sega Saturn. Contemporary previews highlighted the game's traditional side-scrolling design, illustrated environments and extensive character animations. In a May 1995 preview, British magazine Edge drew attention to the game's fairy-tale visual style, comparing its character artwork and backgrounds to Disney animation. The magazine also praised the integration of foregrounds, backgrounds and characters to create a sense of visual depth.

Japanese magazine Saturn Fan highlighted the use of scrolling, enlargement and reduction effects, alongside animated story sequences and environmental interactions. Its pre-release coverage also described the game's support system, in which the bird companion could assist Astal under computer control or be controlled independently by a second player.

== Localization ==
The North American release of Astal featured several changes from the Japanese version. Sega of America reduced the character's default health from five points to three and limited the player to a single continue, compared with unlimited continues in the Japanese release. Players could increase the starting health through the options menu, but could not adjust the number of continues.

The game's opening theme, "Let Me Try Again", featured vocals in the Japanese version, whereas the North American release used an instrumental arrangement.

The Japanese voice cast included Ai Orikasa as Astal, Yuri Shiratori as Leda, Aya Hisakawa as Antowas, Ryō Horikawa as Geist and Daisuke Gōri as Jerado. The North American release featured English dialogue, with Lani Minella credited as its voice actress.

== Reception ==
Reception

Review scores
Publication	Score
AllGame	3.5/5
Computer and Video Games	62/100
Edge	5/10
EP Daily	8/10
Famitsu	7/10, 7/10, 5/10, 5/10
Game Informer	7.75/10
Game Players	66%
IGN	3/10
Mean Machines Sega	53/100
Next Generation	3/5
Flux	A
Mega	72%
Sega MegaZone	80%
Sega Power	63%
Ultimate Future Games	50%
VideoGame Advisor	B
VideoGames	9/10

According to Famitsu, Astal sold 23,919 copies during its lifetime in Japan. The Japanese publication Micom BASIC Magazine ranked the game sixth in popularity in its July 1995 issue, and it received a 19.2/30 in a readers' poll conducted by Saturn Fan. In 2000, Astal earned an average score of 7.3452 out of 10 in a reader survey conducted by the Japanese Sega Saturn Magazine, raking among Sega Saturn titles at number 564. The game was met with average critical sentiments.

GamePro's Lawrence Neves criticized the game's visual aesthetic, saying that "The beautifully drawn graphics are charming, but unfortunately they're charming in the style of those round-eyed-waif paintings." Neves added that the challenge would be too frustrating for children, and that the short stages leave the game with little longevity. He concluded that while it "strengthens the Saturn's platform potential", Astal was merely "a good rental". Jennifer Diane Reitz reviewed the game positively but criticized it for being too short and having a limited number of actions available to players. Reitz summarized it as "Exquisitely beautiful, lovely, wonderful fare. It is too short... but Astal is one hell of a ride while it lasts. A rare, but slightly flawed gem".

Next Generation stated that "Astal is, in the end, a fine, side-scrolling action game, and if you already own a Saturn and you love side-scrolling action games, then this is a good one to pursue, but this game would not exactly make a good argument for buying a 32-bit machine". A contemporary IGN review called the game "crappy" and "derivative" albeit with "pretty graphics". However, in a 2008 article, IGN listed it among the top Sega Saturn games, noting that "The game came out early in the Saturn's lifespan and was largely ignored -- no thanks to the garish box art. But those that did take Astal home cherished this beautiful example of a fading genre".

== Legacy ==
Astal made several cameo appearances in Archie Comics' Sonic the Hedgehog comic book series, particularly in illustrations by artist Patrick Spaziante. These included appearances in issue #50 and on the covers of issues #51 and #125.
