= Super Adventure Rockman =

1998 interactive movie video game published by Capcom

- Developer: Kouyousha
- Publisher: Capcom
- Director: Hayato Kaji
- Series: Mega Man
- Platforms: PlayStation, Sega Saturn
- Release: JP: June 25, 1998
- Genres: FMV game, rail shooter
- Mode: Single-player

Super Adventure Rockman (Note: Japanese: スーパーアドベンチャーロックマン, Hepburn: Sūpā Adobenchā Rokkuman) is a 1998 interactive movie/rail shooter video game developed by Kouyousha and published by Capcom for the PlayStation and Sega Saturn; it is a spin-off of the Mega Man series and follows Mega Man as he attempts to stop an ancient alien supercomputer called "Ra Moon" from taking over the world. The game only saw a Japanese release and hasn't been re-released since.

Considered darker than most Classic series games, Super Adventure Rockman has been met with mixed reception from media critics; Keiji Inafune, who worked on the series up until 2010, has also disowned the game, considering it one of the worst Mega Man games across the series.

== Plot ==
The plot of the game centers on an ancient alien supercomputer named "Ra Moon", which was rediscovered by Dr. Wily in the ruins of the Amazon. Wily uses Ra Moon to revive his Robot Masters from previous games in the series. Wily also discovers Ra Moon's ability to cease almost all machinery and electricity in the world, as well as causing an invasive virus to spread across all technology. Roll is affected by the virus, with Dr. Light immunizing Mega Man and his brothers to prevent them from being infected. With Roll in trouble as well as the rest of the planet, Mega Man sets out to stop Wily and Ra Moon before it's too late.

== Gameplay ==
In-game screenshot featuring Guts Man, Cut Man, and Elec Man

Super Adventure Rockman is an interactive movie video game based on the Mega Man universe. It revolves primarily around the player watching pre-recorded animation cutscenes depicting the storyline. The game is divided into three different disks, each presenting itself as an anime episode and containing roughly a half-hour of video footage. Certain points allow the player to select a branching path, which can either lead them to helpful items left by Dr. Light to help Mega Man, or an ambush by enemies depending on which events happen, sometimes utilizing quick-time events that will cause Mega Man to take damage if they're failed. If the player is ambushed, they are transferred to a rail shooter-like minigame where they must point an on-screen cursor onto enemies and shoot them. Some of these fights feature Robot Masters from Mega Man 2 and Mega Man 3. If Mega Man is defeated by generic enemies, the game is over, but if he loses against a boss, he's usually saved either by the Robot Masters from the first game or by Proto Man, giving the player a chance to try again and have a rematch against the enemy Robot Master.

== Development ==
Super Adventure Rockman was developed by Kouyousha, a studio founded in April 1996 by former Data East developer Hiroshi Nakamura. Mega Man artist and producer Keiji Inafune claimed that Super Adventure Rockman was developed during a time when Capcom was attempting to branch out the series by "selling [it] to the lowest bidder". Although he had little involvement in the game, he was assigned to finish it after the project leader suddenly quit towards its completion. Inafune exclaimed, "The ultimate unspoken rule about making a game that is geared towards children is that you simply cannot kill anyone, but here you have military helicopters falling out of the sky and people dying in droves. If it had been up to me, I would have at least made it so they all 'got away safely' via parachutes or something. Then as if that wasn't bad enough, Roll dies... and to top it all off, the whole world is destroyed! I was like, 'Did they really need to go that far?!'".

In September 2018, a listing appeared on Yahoo! Auctions Japan for the design documents of a scrapped interactive movie titled Rockman X Interactive; it was confirmed by the seller that the game, which was in development between December 1995 and 1996, influenced the development of Super Adventure, however the listing was eventually deleted before anyone could purchase it.

== Reception ==
Reception

Review scores
Publication	Score
Famitsu	27/40 (PS); 27/40 (SS)
Dengeki PlayStation	85/100, 85/100

Upon release, Japanese magazine Famitsu gave both the PlayStation and Saturn versions a 27 out of 40 score.

Brett Elston of GamesRadar included the game in his retrospective on the series for the sake of completeness. "It's a bizarre animated/FMV/first-person game that doesn't really fit anywhere in the main series," Elston stated. "But is so damn weird it has to be pointed out." GameSpot writers Christian Nutt and Justin Speer summarized the game as "an intensely boring and unplayable excursion into timed button pressing". 1UP.com editor Jeremy Parish thought the game may be acceptable for those who understand Japanese. Inafune has apologized to fans for the alleged low quality of the game.

== Other media ==
The game was adapted into the Archie Comics Mega Man comic arc Blackout: The Curse of Ra Moon, and set between Mega Man 2 and Mega Man 3. As a result, the Mega Man 2 Robot Masters are here recreated by Ra Moon, while the Mega Man 3 set is created by Ra Moon from blueprints on a computer owned by Dr. Wily. Proto Man—-going by his Mega Man 3 alias of Break Man—-also joins Wily's forces while he is based in the Lanfront Ruins, and is accidentally responsible for damaging Roll prior to the planet-wide blackout. One of Mega Man 3 bosses, Shadow Man, who in his game of origin was originally an unidentified alien robot, is in the comics revealed to be a creation of Ra Moon who served as its escort when it traveled to Earth. Only a few of the original Mega Man game Robot Masters appeared in the adapt as allies of Mega Man, who is also joined by Break Man and the Mega Man 2 bosses to battle Ra Moon and the mind-controlled Mega Man 3 bosses. Ra Moon is also revealed to be the creator of the Stardroids from Mega Man V, and sends a signal reporting its demise to them after it is defeated by Mega Man.

Worlds Collide (which crossed over into Sonic the Hedgehog) occurred in between the comic's adaptation of SAR, and included a moment of Ra Moon being interested in the blue Chaos Emerald, only for Wily to demand he makes a Met rice cooker. Additionally, Wily and Doctor Eggman used many of their resources including Ra Moon to create both the Skull Egg Zone and the Wily Egg air fortress.
