= Ian Flynn =

American-Canadian comic book writer

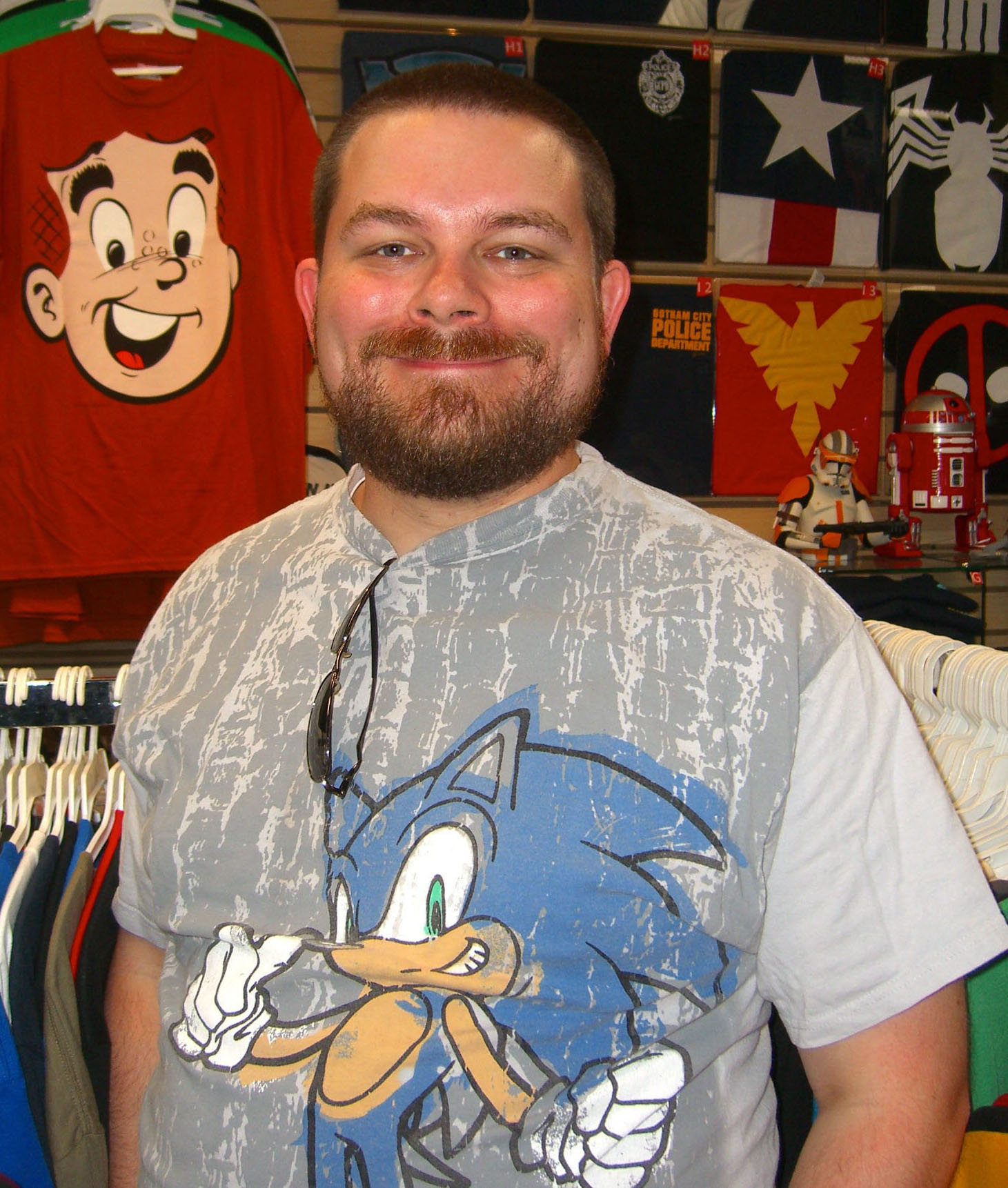
- Flynn at a September 8, 2012 signing for New Crusaders #1 at Midtown Comics in Manhattan
- Born: James Ian Flynn; May 31, 1982 (age 44) Charlotte, North Carolina, U.S.
- Area: Writer
- Notable works: Sonic the Hedgehog (Archie Comics); Sonic the Hedgehog (IDW); Mega Man (Archie Comics); New Crusaders; TMNT (IDW)

James Ian Flynn (born May 31, 1982), also known by his Internet pen name Ian Potto, is an American and Canadian comic book writer. He was chief writer for Archie Comics's Sonic the Hedgehog since issue #160, after the departure of the previous chief writer Ken Penders, until Archie's cancelation on the run at issue #290. As of April 4, 2018, he is the lead writer of IDW Publishing's Sonic the Hedgehog comic series. He is also known for Archie's Mega Man, New Crusaders, Archie (2015), as well as IDW's Teenage Mutant Ninja Turtles.

Starting with Sonic Frontiers, Ian Flynn has contributed to the writing of multiple mainline Sonic games.

== Early life ==
Flynn was born and raised in Charlotte, North Carolina. Flynn went to the University of North Carolina at Greensboro.

== Career ==
Flynn was hired as a writer on Archie's Sonic the Hedgehog after sending in unsolicited proposals. He subsequently wrote Sonic Universe; the Capcom series, Mega Man; and New Crusaders, a superhero title published by the Archie Imprint Red Circle Comics. In the Sonic the Hedgehog series, he collaborated with Tracy Yardley, the penciller for the series since issue #160. Flynn made his television writing debut with the Sonic Boom episode "Anything You Can Do I Can Do Worse-er". In December 2021 he was reported to have been writing the script for Sonic Frontiers; he also wrote the scripts for the prologue comic and animation released in the lead-up to Frontiers' release. Flynn also wrote the story scenes for the Sonic Origins compilation. In 2023, a mobile game released titled Sonic Dream Team, which was another title Flynn was part of the writing team for. Flynn is also a host on a Q&A podcast, known as the Bumblekast, where he previously answered (Note: On December 20, 2024, Flynn announced that beginning in 2025, the Bumblekast would no longer accept questions about the Sonic the Hedgehog franchise, citing conflict of interest concerns; the podcast remains ongoing and questions unrelated to Sonic are still accepted.) questions from fans concerning the Sonic franchise and his work on the series.

Although Sega canceled their Sonic the Hedgehog comic series, Archie Comics brought back Flynn, alongside collaborating colleagues Tracy Yardley and Matt Herms, to revive their Cosmo the Merry Martian intellectual property. The first issue of Cosmo was released in January 2018.

== Personal life ==
As of 2018, Flynn lives in Toronto. He is married to Aleah Baker, who has worked as a writer and colorist on Archie books such as Sonic the Hedgehog and Sonic Universe. Flynn became a naturalized Canadian citizen in May 2023.

== Works ==
=== Comics ===
==== Archie Comics ====
- Archie #624
- Archie & Friends #153
- Archie Comics Double Digest #295 (The Case of the Long Con), 339 (Chain of Command), 343 (story one), 345 (story one), 348 (story one)
- Archie & Friends: Blockbuster Movies (story one)
- Archie and Friends: Level Up! (Servers You Right)
- Archie & Friends: Superheroes
- Archie Christmas Spectacular (2024) (story one), (2026) (Twas the Fight Before Christmas)
- Archie Halloween Spectacular (2022) (Spirits of Halloween), (2024) (Party Hardly!), (2026) (Haunted House Hustle)
- Archie Valentine’s Day Spectacular (2024) (story one)
- Archie's Superteens Versus Crusaders #1-2
- Betty and Veronica: Summer Spectacular (story two)
- Cosmo (2018) #1-5
- Cosmo The Mighty Martian #1-5
- Josie Annual Spectacular (2024) (Encore No More!)
- New Crusaders: Dark Tomorrow Special
- New Crusaders: Rise of the Heroes #1-6
- New Riverdale:
  - Archie (2015) #28-32 (with Mark Waid), 699
  - Jughead vol. 3 #15–16 (co-written by Flynn and Mark Waid, art by Derek Charm, 2017) collected in Jughead Volume 3 (tpb, 144 pages, 2017, ISBN 1-68255-956-4)
- Mega Man (Archie) #1-55
- Mega Man: Worlds Unite Battles #1
- Sabrina the Teenage Witch (Vol. 2) #101-104
- Sabrina the Teenage Witch Annual Spectacular (2024) (Awakening)
- Sonic the Hedgehog (Archie):
  - Sonic Boom (Archie) #1-4, 6-10
  - Sonic: Mega Drive
  - Sonic: Mega Drive - The Next Level
  - Sonic Super-Sized Comics Digest #11 (Sonic Comic Origins short story)
  - Sonic Super Digest #8-9, 12, 15 (Sonic Comic Origins short stories)
  - Sonic the Hedgehog (Archie) #160-290
  - Sonic the Hedgehog Free Comic Book Day (Archie) 2007, 2009-2011, 2012 (Genesis Awakenings segments), 2013-2015
  - Sonic the Hedgehog Halloween ComicFest 2013
  - Sonic Universe #1-32, 37-54, 59-70, 71-74 (Co-Writer), 75-78, 83-90, 91-94 (Co-Writer)
  - Sonic X (Archie) #16-17, 23, 25-27, 30-32, 34-35, 37-40
- Super Duck #1
- The Mighty Crusaders: Lost Crusade Special
- Betty and Veronica Jumbo Comics Digest #305 (The Doctor is In Vogue), 310 (What's in a Name? and Clowning Around), 312-314 (Real Horse Power, The Foxy New Kid, On the Web, Dr. Zardox’s Revenge & Evil is as Evil Does), 317-319 (Weird, Weird West, Masque-Raiding! & Holiday Heist), 324 (The Best for Last)
- World of Archie Double Digest #85 (The Case of Hiding in Plain Sight), 97 (Scaredy Cat), 123 (Case of the Party Crasher)
- World of Betty and Veronica Jumbo Comics Digest #21-24 (Expensive Stuffing, The Ultimate Test, Yacht's Wrong with You? & Foxy Ladies), 26-27 (Flagging Resolve & No Time for Justice), 31 (Reindeer of Terror)

==== Dark Horse Comics ====
- Free Comic Book Day 2018: All-Ages (ARMS)
- Minecraft: Stories from the Overworld

==== DC Comics ====
- DC X Sonic the Hedgehog #1-5
- DC X Sonic the Hedgehog: Metal Legion #1-5
- Superman Special #1

==== IDW Publishing ====
- My Little Pony: Feats of Friendship #1-3
- My Little Pony/Transformers
  - My Little Pony/Transformers: Friendship in Disguise! (trade paperback, 2021, IDW, ISBN 978-1684057597) includes:
    - My Little Pony/Transformers: Friendship in Disguise! #1-2, 4
  - My Little Pony/Transformers: The Magic of Cybertron (trade paperback, 2021, IDW, ISBN 978-1684058709) includes:
    - My Little Pony/Transformers: The Magic of Cybertron #2, 4
- Sonic the Hedgehog (IDW):
  - Sonic Superstars: Fang's Big Break (Note: Originally published digitally by Sega, later published physically by IDW.)
  - Sonic The Hedgehog #1: 5th Anniversary Edition (five-page story: “Familiar Territory”)
  - Sonic the Hedgehog 30th Anniversary Special
  - Sonic the Hedgehog's 900th Adventure (intro, outro and basic plot; pages 1-6 and 37-40)
  - Sonic the Hedgehog (IDW) #1-32, 41-44, 50-51, 57-58, 62-66 (Co-Writer), 67, 76-80, 84-86 (Co-Writer), Annual 2019-2020, 2022, 2024
  - Sonic the Hedgehog: Amy Rose 30th Anniversary Special
  - Sonic the Hedgehog: Bad Guys #1-4
  - Sonic the Hedgehog: Fang the Hunter #1-4
  - Sonic the Hedgehog Free Comic Book Day (IDW) 2022
  - Sonic the Hedgehog: Imposter Syndrome #1-4
  - Sonic the Hedgehog: Knuckles' 30th Anniversary Special
  - Sonic the Hedgehog: Tails 30th Anniversary Special
  - Sonic the Hedgehog: Tangle & Whisper #1-4
- Star Wars Adventures (2017) #23-24
- Teenage Mutant Ninja Turtles: Amazing Adventures #5, 7-8
- Teenage Mutant Ninja Turtles: Macro-Series: Michelangelo
- Teenage Mutant Ninja Turtles Universe #19-20, 25

==== Udon Entertainment ====
- Mega Man Adventures Volume 1 (short story: “Harmonic Interlude”), #0
- Mega Man Zero Timelines #1

==== Other publishers ====
- Sonic Boom: Shattered Crystal (Sonic Boom – Prelude prologue in-game comic)
- Sonic Forces digital comic (Sega)
- Sonic Frontiers Prologue: Convergence (Sega)
- Sonic X Shadow Generations X Chao (Sega)
- Sonic the Hedgehog Blue Racer (Sega)
- Tales of Aether #1-4
- Uncanny Valley High (Space Goat Publishing) #1-4
- Drogune:
  - Drogune: Fortune's Lap
  - Drogune: Outlaw
- Hokis, Focus! (Nakama Press)
- The Nine Lives of Klaws McGee #1-2
- Eternal Quest
- sparkFLAME: Comic Anthology (Drogune and The Nine Lives of Klaws McGee short stories)

=== Books ===
- Sonic the Hedgehog: Encyclo-Speed-ia
- Sonic the Hedgehog Super Awesome Journal
- Sonic the Hedgehog: The Official Coloring Adventure
- Sonic the Hedgehog: Tiny Book
- The Official Sonic the Hedgehog: Amy Rose's Fortune Card Deck
- World of Warcraft Tarot Deck & Guidebook
- Mortal Kombat: Flawless Victory: A Visual History of the Iconic Series

=== Animation ===
- Sonic and the Secret Rings (Sand, Spirits and Sonic Speed - motion comic)
- Sonic Boom
  - Anything You Can Do, I Can Do Worse-er
  - Og Man Out
- Sonic Colors: Rise of the Wisps (Script consultant)
- Sonic Frontiers Prologue: Divergence
- Sonic Prime (story consultant)
- Sonic Racing: CrossWorlds - The Animation (story consultant), CrossTalk promotional videos
- Sonic Superstars: Trio of Trouble
- Sonic X Shadow Generations: Dark Beginnings
- Sonic The Hedgehog: Memories and Beyond
- Rivals of Aether 2 - Orcane, Etalus, Olympia, Absa, Galvan, La Reina, Slade, Gouie Reveal Trailers

=== Video games ===
- DC Unchained - Localization
- Dungeons of Aether - Writer, narrative director
- Indivisible - Writer
- Love Pretend - Localization
- Rivals of Aether - Writer, narrative director
- Rivals of Aether 2 - Narrative director
- Sonic the Hedgehog:
  - Sonic Dream Team - Writer
  - Sonic Frontiers - Writer
  - Sonic Origins - Story Mode script writer
  - Sonic X Shadow Generations - Writer
  - Sonic Racing: CrossWorlds - Writer
- Vay - Voice actor (Heibelger, Lance; iOS port)

=== Podcasts ===
- BumbleKast (host)
- Sonic the Hedgehog Presents: The Chaotix Casefiles (writer)
