= Mega Man (Archie Comics) =

North American comic book series

- The cover of Mega Man #55, the final issue of the series' initial run

Publication information
- Publisher: Archie Comics; Capcom; Udon Entertainment
- Publication date: Archie: April 2011 – December 2015; Udon: December 2026 - present
- No. of issues: 55

Creative team
- Written by: Ian Flynn
- Artists: Patrick "Spaz" Spaziante; Chad Thomas; Ben Bates; Ryan Jampole

Mega Man (retroactively referred to and relaunched as Mega Man Adventures) is a comic series produced by Archie Comics based on the video game series of the same name by Capcom. It was announced at New York Comic Con 2010, and the series began publication in April 2011 with Ian Flynn, who has written many stories for Archie's Sonic the Hedgehog series, as its lead writer. The series proved successful and received a positive reception overall, but it was not as commercially successful as the Sonic Archie Comics. In 2013, a crossover took place between the Mega Man and Sonic series, under the title "Worlds Collide". The series does not follow the events of the games in exact order, including an adaptation of the Japanese exclusive game Super Adventure Rockman between those of Mega Man 2 and Mega Man 3. The series later included a few stories set in the time of the Mega Man X series. The popularity of Worlds Collide subsequently led to a second crossover with the Sonic series, Worlds Unite. The series was put into an "indefinite hiatus" after issue 55, concluding with setup for an adaptation of Mega Man 4.

The series is also notable for the artistic liberties taken with various characters. Shadow Man of Mega Man 3 and the Stardroids of Mega Man V are both featured as creations of Ra Moon, the primary antagonist from Super Adventure Rockman, and all are featured as foes of a group of robots based on Mega Man 8 character Duo. Mega Man and Proto Man's Japanese names-Rock and Blues-are adapted as the names for their civilian forms. Several Robot Masters also appear in the series earlier than they did in the games.

In April 2025, Udon Entertainment announced a reprint of the series under the title Mega Man Adventures, with updated art and new short stories from the original creative team. At San Diego Comic-Con 2026, Udon announced that they will continue the comic under the Adventures banner, picking up directly after issue #55.

== Synopsis ==
As in the Mega Man games, the comic is set on the planet Earth in the near future of 20XX, in which advanced robots capable of independent thought and decisions making have been developed. The evil scientist Dr. Wily sets out to conquer the world, doing so first by stealing or creating advanced automatons known as Robot Masters. In order to stop him, Rock - a helper robot created by Wily's old colleague, Dr. Light - volunteers to be equipped with weapons so that he can stand against him.

=== Issues #1-23 ===
Issues #1-4 serve as an adaptation of the first Mega Man, while #5-8 are a loose adaptation of Mega Man Powered Up, incorporating the characters of Time Man and Oil Man. #9-12 adapt the events of Mega Man 2, while #13-#16 serve introduce the Emerald Spears, an anti-technology extremist group. #17-18 adapt the backstory for Proto Man discussed in various games, most notably Mega Man 2: The Power Fighters. The following issues provide build-up for the then-upcoming Super Adventure Rockman story arc before being interrupted by the events of Worlds Collide at the end of issue #23.

=== Worlds Collide ===
Worlds Collide is a crossover between the universes of Mega Man and Archie's Sonic the Hedgehog comic series. The 12-part miniseries takes place across Mega Man issues #24-27, Sonic Universe issues #51-54, and Sonic the Hedgehog issues #248-251.

=== Issues #28–49 ===
Following the conclusion of Worlds Collide, an adaptation of Super Adventure Rockman takes place during issues #28-32. Issues #33-36 address the fallout from these events and set the stage for the events of Mega Man 3, while also adapting the origin story of Mega Man X and the Reploids from the Mega Man X series. #37-40 feature an original storyline split between the two time periods, during which Mega Man and his team must defeat a rogue Wily robot while the Maverick Hunters encounter the same robot a century later. Issues #41-48 serve as an adaptation of Mega Man 3, while #49 acts as a prelude to the events of Worlds Unite.

=== Worlds Unite ===
Worlds Unite is the second crossover between the Mega Man and Sonic the Hedgehog comics. In addition to the casts of the main Mega Man and Sonic books, Worlds Unite also features characters from the Mega Man X timeline and Sonic Boom universe, as well as several other Capcom and Sega franchises such as Street Fighter, Golden Axe, Viewtiful Joe, Panzer Dragoon, Ōkami, Nights into Dreams..., Monster Hunter, Ghosts 'n Goblins, and Skies of Arcadia. The 12-part miniseries takes place across Sonic Universe issues #76-78, Sonic Boom issues #8-10, Sonic the Hedgehog issues #273-275, Mega Man issues #50-52, and two Worlds Unite "Battle Books".

=== Issues #53–55 ===
Returning to the usual storyline of the series, these issues lead up into an indefinite hiatus taken by the series. These include a story where Mega Man confronts the idea of no longer being a fighting robot due to Wily's disappearance, while Blues—Mega Man's older brother—transitions from his identity of Break Man to that of Proto Man. Both of these stories included buildup to the events of Mega Man 4 and set up for subsequent games, enabled by Wily's association with the X Corporation, his deception of Blues and Kalinka's kidnapping. However, due to the comic series going on hiatus, the story stops before the Mega Man 4 arc could start. The concluding issue features a time travel experiment mishap that results in Dr. Light viewing events depicted in the remaining Mega Man titles not yet adapted (4 through 10, including the handheld spin offs) plus Mega Man X, Mega Man Zero, Mega Man ZX, Mega Man ZX Advent, and Mega Man Legends timelines.

== Characters ==
The comic book has had a large cast of characters, primarily originating from the video games. A number of original characters were created for this comic series. Due to the large cast, only comic-exclusive characters are included in this section.

- Gilbert D. Stern: A federal agent who has an inherent distrust of machines of all types, particularly robots.
- Roslyn Krantz: A federal agent who, unlike her partner Stern, is more comfortable around robots and is a little more eager to maintain peace and calm in tense situations.
- Pedro Astil: A Brazilian scientist and acquaintance of Dr. Light. He is Plant Man's creator and is involved in the first expedition of the Lanfront Ruins.
- Dr. Noele Lalinde: A colleague of Dr. Light and Dr. Cossack that works for Geoworks International. She is the creator of Quake Woman and is implied to be a love interest for Light.
- Quake Woman: A Robot Master created for geological surveillance. Originally named Tempo, an accident results in Lalinde removing her personality for fear of attachment, before later reversing her decision. Initially depicted as stoic and logical, she slowly relearns self-expression after her emotions are restored.
- Vesper Woman: Dr. Lalinde's second Robot Master, created from an unused design by Dr. Light for botanical cataloging. She serves the additional purpose of helping Quake Woman explore her renewed emotional capacity. Her relationship with Quake Woman is a teasing one, as evidenced by her implying that Blues was Quake Woman's "boyfriend" upon their first encounter.
- Xander Payne: A former military officer and the current leader of the Emerald Spears terrorists. He has an extreme hatred of robots after losing his left eye in Dr. Wily's initial attack. After a failed attempt at time travel, he adopts the persona of Mr. X and used his knowledge of the future to fund the X Corporation.

== Collected editions ==
The series has so far been assembled into the following collections:

Title	Format	ISBN	Release date	Collected material	Issues published
Mega Man Vol. 1 - Let the Games Begin!	Paperback	978-1879794856	September 27, 2011	Mega Man #1-4	May 2011 – August 2011
Mega Man Vol. 2 - Time Keeps Slipping	Paperback	978-1879794955	March 20, 2012	Mega Man #5-8	September 2011 – December 2011
Mega Man Vol. 3 - The Return of Dr. Wily	Paperback	978-1936975112	August 28, 2012	Mega Man #9-12	January 2012 – April 2012
Mega Man Vol. 4 - Spiritus Ex Machina	Paperback	978-1936975273	December 26, 2012	Mega Man #13-16	May 2012 – August 2012
Mega Man Vol. 5 - Rock of Ages	Paperback	978-1936975488	June 11, 2013	Mega Man #17-20	August 2012 – December 2012
Mega Man Vol. 6 - Breaking Point	Paperback	978-1936975785	February 25, 2014	Mega Man #21-23, #28	January 2013 – August 2013
Mega Man Vol. 7 - Blackout: The Curse of Ra Moon	Paperback	978-1936975952	September 30, 2014	Mega Man #29-32	September 2013 – December 2013
Mega Man Vol. 8 - Redemption	Paperback	978-1619889446	February 24, 2015	Mega Man #33-36	January 2014 – April 2014
Mega Man Adventures Volume 1: A Hero is Built	Hardcover	978-1772943948	July 21, 2026	Mega Man #1–12, plus bonus story.	May 2011 – April 2012
Mega Man Adventures Volume 2: Breaking Loose	Hardcover	TBC	TBD	Mega Man #13-23, #28, plus bonus story.	May 2012 – August 2013

=== Cancelled ===
Title	Format	ISBN	Original date	Collected material	Issues published
Mega Man Vol. 9 - Dawn of X	Paperback	978-1619889651	May 27, 2015	Mega Man #37-40	May 2014 – August 2014
Mega Man Vol. 10 - Legends of the Blue Bomber	Paperback	978-1627389440	September 16, 2015	Mega Man #41-44	September 2014 – December 2014
Mega Man Vol. 11 - The Ultimate Betrayal	Paperback	978-1627388061	N/A	Mega Man #45-48	January 2015 – April 2015
Mega Man: Master Edition Vol. 1	Paperback	978-1627388733	May 4, 2016	Mega Man #1–12	May 2011 – April 2012

== Development ==
The comic book series was first announced by Archie Comics during 2010's New York Comic-Con. Originally slated for a spring 2011 release, CEO Jon Goldwater later estimated a May 2011 release, which was confirmed on the official website.

Kaminski and Flynn noted that, prior to his introduction, many fans sent them messages expressing a desire to see X portrayed as a darker character. They decided not to start with the Command Mission incarnation, which depicted X as more of a leader.
