= Sonic Chronicles: The Dark Brotherhood =

2008 video game

- U.S. cover art
- Developer: BioWare
- Publisher: Sega
- Director: Mark Darrah
- Producer: Kirby Fong
- Designers: Miles Holmes; Dan Tudge
- Artist: Joel MacMillan
- Writers: Jay Turner; Cookie Everman
- Composers: Steven Sim; Richard Jacques
- Series: Sonic the Hedgehog
- Platform: Nintendo DS
- Release: AU: September 25, 2008; EU: September 26, 2008; NA: September 30, 2008; JP: August 6, 2009
- Genre: Role-playing
- Mode: Single-player

Sonic Chronicles: The Dark Brotherhood (Note: Japanese: ソニッククロニクル 闇次元からの侵略者, Hepburn: Sonikku Kuronikuru Yami Jigen Kara no Shinryaku sha; lit. 'Sonic Chronicles: Invaders from the Dark Dimension') is a 2008 role-playing video game developed by BioWare and published by Sega for the Nintendo DS. It is a part of the Sonic the Hedgehog series, and is its only RPG entry. Sonic Chronicles initially focuses on the events surrounding the kidnapping of Knuckles and the disappearance of the Chaos Emeralds after the defeat of Doctor Eggman, before moving on to follow the cast of characters across two dimensions as they encounter a new ally, Shade the Echidna, and seek to stop the invasion of their world by Ix, the leader of Shade's tribe, the Nocturnus. The game is mainly played using the DS stylus, with players either exploring the overworld, or attacking with multiple characters in combat.

Development began in 2006 as BioWare's first handheld project, who were normally used to the long development cycles of video games; the game eventually transitioned to a Sonic project with over 30 people involved, with many of BioWare's developers being big fans of the series and wanting to further expand on its world. The design progress for gameplay was based on four "activity pillars", while the graphical style was primarily based on the earlier Sonic games, being colorful and anime-like. It released in Australia, Europe, and North America in September 2008, and then in Japan the following year as Invaders from the Dark Dimension.

Sonic Chronicles: The Dark Brotherhood was met with mixed reviews from critics, who appreciated both the graphics and environments, as well as Sonic's overall transition to the role-playing genre, while the music and story were received with mixed reactions, as were some gameplay elements such as the combat system. The game also garnered controversy after former Archie Comics writer Ken Penders sued Sega and BioWare for alleged copyright infringement, claiming that the Nocturnus Clan were too similar to his Dark Legion echidna characters, whom he had claimed copyright for. Although intended as the first in a series of Sonic RPGs, plans were scrapped after Electronic Arts acquired BioWare shortly after its release and Chronicles sold below expectations, becoming a one-off game.

== Gameplay ==
A battle scenario in Sonic Chronicles, showing the player using the stylus to select their next action

Sonic Chronicles is a turn-based role-playing game, with rhythm and timing elements. It primarily features two types of gameplay: exploration and combat. In exploration areas, the character is controlled by tapping the stylus where the player wants the character to go, while action buttons are used to traverse certain elements, such as vertical loops. Navigation can also require a certain character to be in the lead for progress to continue, taking advantage of that character's special ability, be it flying, climbing, or jumping large gaps. Puzzle elements are also featured, allowing the party to break up to complete the task, such as pressing switches in various areas.

Combat gameplay occurs when enemies are walked into, shifting the view to a close-up for turn-based battles to occur. Standard attacks are available, while special attacks, dubbed POW Moves, can be performed by rhythmically tapping the stylus. These will use up POW Points, in a manner similar to Magic Points in other RPGs. Examples of individual special attacks include Sonic's Axe Kick and Whirlwind, while some group-based special attacks require certain characters in the party, such as the Blue Bomber, which requires both Sonic and Tails. After combat is complete, loot is available, ranging from healing items to character equipment - equippable in one of three slots per character - while experience points boosts up to two of four attributes per character: speed, attack, defense, and luck.

Characters can also collect and equip Chao, each with their own ability, to enhance a team member's status. These Chao are collectable and can be stored in the Chao Garden, and using the DS' wireless connectivity, players can swap the Chao they have collected.

== Plot ==
Sonic Chronicles is split into two acts, further divided into several chapters. It opens by detailing Eggman's defeat and presumed death, some time ago after the destruction of the Egg Carrier at the hands of Sonic and friends. In the present, Sonic is on vacation when he receives a call from Tails, stating that Knuckles has been kidnapped by a group called the Marauders, and they have stolen the Chaos Emeralds. Travelling with Amy to meet Tails, they are escorted by Rouge the Bat to meet the GUN Commander, who informs them that they have been watching the Marauders for some time, and know where to search. Having no luck, they eventually locate the Marauders' base in the Mystic Ruins where they find Knuckles, who is found escaping from some robots; leaving the base, they find Angel Island is gone. Devices found in their initial search help them locate Eggman, who claims to be reformed after surviving the Egg Carrier's crash. He informs the team that Angel Island is being pulled to Metropolis, the location of the Marauders' main base.

With Metropolis as their next destination, they meet Shadow and he joins up in order to find E-123 Omega, but are attacked by Shade and her Marauders. She reveals herself to be an Echidna of the Nocturnus Tribe, leaving Knuckles, supposedly the last of the Knuckles Clan of Echidnas, shocked. After her defeat, the team heads to Angel Island where they are shot down and meet the Nocturnus leader, the Grand Imperator Ix, who reveals his plot to take over the dimension after escaping from the Twilight Cage. Ix then betrays Shade by throwing her off the island, before escaping with the Master Emerald, only for her to be saved by Knuckles while Tails and Eggman build a vehicle to transport them to the other dimension. Through meeting various creatures, they eventually gather all of the missing Chaos Emeralds and begin to invade the Nocturnus home world. Ix uses the Master Emerald to transform, but Sonic uses the Chaos Emeralds to become Super Sonic and finally defeats him.

As Nocturne begins to fall, and is nearly destroyed, the team escapes to the Cyclone and heads back to Earth. However, they discover that several years have passed since they left, and Eggman has fully rebuilt his empire. The game ends with Eggman shooting down the Cyclone, and a "THE END?" screen.

== Development and release ==
Director Mark Darrah stated that development began in 2006 when BioWare began to look into developing a handheld video game project. Some time thereafter, the development of a Sonic handheld game began, and eventually the project had over 30 people involved. As BioWare's first handheld project, the BioWare development team, used to the long development cycles of video games, had to adjust to the change of pace that handheld development brought. BioWare's employees were fans of the Sonic series as a whole, and felt they could bring their reputation for strong story-driven games to expand the Sonic series. While wanting to stay true to the Sonic franchise as a whole, they also wanted to add their own touches, such as introducing original, darker elements to the storyline; the second dimension, including its new characters and locations, was one such element. Prior to the official reveal of the game in Nintendo Power, its existence was accidentally leaked after Sega filed a patent for it in the U.S.

The design process for gameplay was built on the idea of satisfying four "activity pillars": story and character, encompassing characters that the player would want to get to know and spend time with; combat, encompassing conflict as the game progresses; progression customization, so that players are able to upgrade their characters as they see fit with such elements as new abilities and attributes; and exploration, in which the player can visit and explore many differing environments. BioWare decided to opt for a look reminiscent of the early games in the Sonic series, and so opted for more flat-shaded, anime-like characters, as well as saturated, vibrant environments and backdrops. Richard Jacques, long-time producer of music for the Sonic series, composed some of the music tracks for Chronicles, in the traditional Sonic style; many of the tracks are borrowed from Sonic 3D Blast (1996), the Sega Saturn version of which Jacques was the lead composer for.

During February 2008, Sega announced that it would be giving fans the opportunity to vote on the name of a hostile alien race that would appear within the game. From March 4, fans were invited to vote on Sega Europe's Sonic portal Sonic City for their preferred name. The winning entry in the contest was announced as the Zoa, a reference to the town in Panzer Dragoon Saga. The name was suggested as a potential name initially by the Sega fan blog Sega Nerds. Lead artist and animator Joel MacMillan and Nick DiLiberto produced an animated introduction for the game, however it was replaced with a gameplay montage in the final; the full animation was eventually posted online.

Sonic Chronicles was playable at the 2008 E3, PAX and Leipzig conventions, as well as the Summer of Sonic event. The game went gold on September 5, 2008, and was officially released in Australia on September 25, in Europe on September 26, and then North America on September 30. In Japan, Chronicles was released on August 6, 2009, nearly a year after its international release. Players who had pre-ordered the game through GameStop would receive a stylus with Sonic, Knuckles, or Shade figures; in Australia, players who had pre-ordered it via EB Games instead received a Chronicles-themed case for the system.

== Reception ==
Reception

Aggregate score
Aggregator	Score
Metacritic	74/100

Review scores
Publication	Score
1Up.com	A
Eurogamer	7/10
Famitsu	28/40
Game Informer	8.5/10
IGN	6.5/10
NGamer	7.9/10
Nintendo Power	8/10
Nintendo World Report	6/10
Official Nintendo Magazine	93%
PALGN	6.5/10

=== Sales ===
Sonic Chronicles sold poorly in Japan with only 2,100 sales reported within the first week of release, which was blamed on the overall lack of promotion for the game in the region; it eventually sold 7,533 units. The ELSPA awarded the game a Silver Sales Award, indicating at least 100,000 units sold in the United Kingdom. Chronicles briefly became the tenth best-selling Nintendo DS game in North America in October 2008, before dropping off the charts entirely.

=== Critical response ===
Sonic Chronicles: The Dark Brotherhood received "mixed or average" reviews from critics, garnering a 74 out of 100 average at review aggregator platform Metacritic.

Critics expressed surprise at the simplistic gameplay and low difficulty. Both GamePro and PALGN agreed that the game would be suitable to younger players, with Emily Balistrieri writing "All in all, Sonic Chronicles: The Dark Brotherhood is a fairly easy and light RPG that I'm sure younger gamers will have a blast with." Reception to the battle system was mixed, with Ryan Scott of 1Up.com describing it as a joy, while Nintendo Power found it becoming a "major annoyance in the second half of the game", but that it was worth sticking through. Reviewers compared the combat to Elite Beat Agents (2006). The lack of multiplayer options, aside from the ability to share Chao, was also seen as a disappointment.

The overall scenario was received with mixed reception. Critics acknowledged that, compared to other games in the genre, the "chapter-based story is predictably lightweight and cartoony", and that it took a back seat to gameplay. Reviewers also agreed that the story only begins to become more elaborate and interesting in the second half of the game, with Matthew Castle writing for Computer and Video Games "only later do Bioware start throwing around their universe-building weight." Brian Fore of Game Informer felt the characters were well written and likeable.

The presentation was generally well received. Eurogamer called it "undeniably nice-looking", which IGN agreed with, citing the models and environments as well done, although noting the poor audio quality. Conversely, GamePro wrote that "the graphics aren't exactly dazzling, especially when compared to the visually sharp cut-scenes," also citing the "primitive" soundtrack and sound effects.

=== Plagiarism allegations ===
Former Archie head writer Ken Penders felt that the Nocturnus Clan antagonists were heavily derived from his own echidna characters in the Archie Comics Sonic titles, which he had begun copyrighting in January 2009. After the similarities were brought to his attention, he filed a lawsuit against Sega and Electronic Arts in 2011 for alleged copyright infringement. The case was dismissed without prejudice on September 26, 2011, then again in February 2012, after the case had been refiled four days after it was originally dismissed, despite warnings from Judge Otis Wright who dismissed the case both times. In October 2013, the CA 9th Appellate Court upheld Judge Wright's initial ruling.

Writing for Intelligencer, Bobby Schroeder speculated that content from Sonic Chronicles has not made any appearances since its release to prevent further legal action from Penders despite the case's dismissal. The exception is Nocturne, the site of the game's final battle, which is used as the start and finish of the Dream Bobsledding course in the Wii version of Mario & Sonic at the Olympic Winter Games (2009). The Sonic the Hedgehog Encyclo-speed-ia (2021) declared the game non canon.

== Legacy ==
Archie Comics made an adaption of Sonic Chronicles titled Invaders from Beyond, featuring the kidnapping of Knuckles. The short strip only covers what happened before the game's story, which acts as a sort of prologue, and ends by urging readers to buy Sonic Chronicles to find out "what happens next". In Japan, a manga adaptation of the game was published within the pages of Dengeki Nintendo DS.

A sequel to the game was once seen as a possibility if the game performed well enough, with the developers having "a precise idea" for how the sequel should be made. However, after BioWare was acquired by Electronic Arts, plans for a sequel were dropped, and it remains the only RPG in the franchise's history. In 2023, designer Miles Holmes shared plot details with Did You Know Gaming?.
