= Riding Shotgun (comics) =

Comic written by Nate Bowden and Tracy Yardley

Riding Shotgun is a comic written by Nate Bowden and Tracy Yardley, and published by Tokyopop in 2006. A motion comic was created out of volume 1 for YouTube, with music by Far East Movement and Interceptor. A 6-minute 13 second short film was released through Mondo Media on YouTube on Aug 2, 2013.

== Story ==
Doyle Harrington and Abby Witt are a team of assassins in a world where assassination has been legalized in America.

== Reception ==
- ComicCritique.com gave it five stars.
