= DC x Sonic the Hedgehog =

2025 comic book miniseries

- Standard cover of DC x Sonic the Hedgehog #1, art by Pablo M. Collar.

Publication information
- Publisher: DC Comics
- Schedule: Monthly
- Format: Limited series
- Genre: Superhero
- Publication date: March 2025 – July 2025 (first miniseries); May 2026 – September 2026 (Metal Legion)
- No. of issues: 10

Creative team
- Written by: Ian Flynn
- Artist: Adam Bryce Thomas
- Letterer: Becca Carey
- Colorist: Matt Herms
- Editor: Michael McCalister

DC x Sonic the Hedgehog is an American crossover comic book miniseries, written by Ian Flynn, with art by Adam Bryce Thomas, and published by DC Comics. It is a crossover between the Sonic the Hedgehog franchise and the DC Universe. The first miniseries (Note: The arc is referred to as Chaos Crisis in the interior pages.) was released in March 2025, and features Sonic the Hedgehog and his friends teaming up with the Justice League to defeat the New God Darkseid, with Sonic and friends eventually taking the roles of the League. The second miniseries, Metal Legion, was released in May 2026, and follows Sonic and his friends working with the League to battle against Doctor Eggman and the Legion of Doom.

== Publication history ==
The collaboration between DC Comics and the Sonic the Hedgehog franchise was first teased on Batman Day in September 2024, with a short animation featuring Shadow the Hedgehog as Batman animated by Tyson Hesse and Mariel Cartwright. During a Sonic Central broadcast that same month, Sega confirmed the collaboration was to start with the DC x Sonic the Hedgehog comic book series, accompanied by merchandise, and last into 2026. Ian Flynn, the head writer of the Archie and IDW Sonic comics, was hired as the writer of the series. The artist of the series, Adam Bryce Thomas, is also a regular artist of the Sonic comics. Jakks Pacific began releasing action figures based on the crossover in 2025.

== Plot ==
=== First miniseries ===
Darkseid and his forces enter Sonic the Hedgehog's universe seeking the power of the seven Chaos Emeralds. Darkseid shatters the Master Emerald, the gem neutralizing their power. Sonic and the rest of his friends (Miles "Tails" Prower, Knuckles the Echidna, Amy Rose, Shadow the Hedgehog and Silver the Hedgehog) battle Darkseid's armies with help from the Justice League (Flash, Superman, Batman, Wonder Woman, Cyborg and Green Lantern (John Stewart)), who have been hunting Darkseid after he launched the Ragna Rock, a mobile cross-dimensional satellite. Sonic and his friends agree to work with the League, with each of them pairing up with a League member. Sonic and Flash speed off to find and confront Darkseid, only to discover he has already found the blue Chaos Emerald.

Sonic and Flash briefly clash against Darkseid, before he exits. DeSaad explains to his master that it seems the Emeralds may be trying to hide from a Father Box. Darkseid orders his army to sift through the world, and put the Emerald he currently has into the Dimensional Engine. The two teams of heroes fight off the invading Apokoliptians, as Darkseid starts to put the Emerald into the Dimensional Engine, warping space and time itself. Dr. Eggman arrives and fights off the Ragna Rock. The two teams fight Darkseid as the Dimensional Engine begins to destabilize. Time and space breaks, and Cyborg sends Sonic's group through the boom tube. Sonic and his friends meet Mister Terrific, to whom they beg to reopen the boom tube. Mister Terrific then reveals that there are no dimensional coordinates to the target, as their Earth itself was apparently destroyed along with the League and Darkseid.

In reality, their universe and the League are still alive after Flash recovers the red Emerald from Darkseid, and Cyborg uses one of his wormholes to warp himself and the League onto Sonic's Earth, as they learn the planet is destabilized by the Dimensional Engine. The League decide to find the other Emeralds and protect the people of the planet as they do so. At Tails' lab, Cyborg details the League's plan to send the Emeralds into their universe so Sonic and his friends can use them to open the portal.

At the same time, Sonic and his friends become motivated with protecting the League's world while wearing their costumes; Sonic wearing the Flash's costume, Tails wearing an armor resembling Cyborg's components, Amy wearing a Wonder Woman dress, Knuckles wearing a Superman costume, Silver donning the Green Lantern Ring, and Shadow donning a Batman suit. The group battles the rampaging supervillains while finding the other Chaos Emeralds. After gathering in the Hall of Justice, the group discover that their universe was not destroyed, merely hidden in a pocket dimension which Mister Terrific could not trace. With Mister Terrific's help, Sonic and his friends open a dimensional portal to return to their world and reunite with the League.

Cyborg and Tails build a device similar to the one which sent the Emeralds to the League's universe, with which they plan to use the Emeralds to resonate with the one in Darkseid's possession. Breaking through the Ragna Rock, the teams confront Darkseid, with Sonic and Flash recovering the last Emerald as others hold Darkseid off. Darkseid attempts to kill Sonic and Flash with his Omega Beams, only for Sonic to absorb the other six and transform into Super Sonic, helping turn the tide of the fight. Cyborg's and Tails's device is given enough power to commence their plan, as Flash uses Speed Force energy to power it up. Darkseid attempts to tear reality apart with a shroud of darkness, but is foiled by the powered-up device, which restores reality back to normal, sending both teams back to their universes. As Shadow and Silver check on the restored city, and Knuckles continues guarding the rebuilt Master Emerald, Sonic continues his picnic with Tails and Amy in Never Lake, while hoping that he and his friends will meet the Justice League again.

Elsewhere, Eggman has entered the League's universe and formed an alliance with Lex Luthor, as they both conspire to bring their enemies to their knees with a new Death Egg Robot made of LexCorp technology.

=== Metal Legion ===
Sometime after the battle against Darkseid, the universes of Sonic and his friends and of the Justice League become connected with one another again through dimensional portals labeled “L.E.X.E.G.G.” (Luminous Extradimensional Energized Gateway Generator), with Sonic and his friends reuniting with their League partners, and some of their other friends and allies starting new friendships, such as the ones between Big the Cat and Aquaman, Cream the Rabbit and Supergirl, Blaze the Cat and Starfire, along with Rouge the Bat and Catwoman. What only Batman and Shadow suspect so far, is that Luthor and Eggman have formed an alliance, and are behind L.E.X.E.G.G., as Eggman ends up joining the Legion of Doom (consisting of Black Manta, Cheetah, Captain Cold, Sinestro, and Gizmo).

However, Eggman quickly infuriates the other members, who plan to turn on him once their plan is complete. Luthor sends Catwoman to spy on Eggman, who in turn sends Rouge to spy on Luthor; both evil geniuses plot to betray each other after their victory against Sonic, his friends and the Justice League. Little do they know, that Rouge and Catwoman are actually double-agents working for the League, who have assigned them to spy on the Legion. While Luthor attends a press conference about the L.E.X.E.G.G, each member of the Legion makes their attack in different locations across both worlds, drawing the attention of the heroes. The villains draw the heroes into the portals and while they emerge safely in the Hall of Doom, the heroes are all transported to Null Space (Note: introduced in the 2017 video game Sonic Forces).

As the heroes are hopeful to find a way out, Eggman and the Legion celebrate their success, until their alliance becomes shattered; Luthor and the Legion attempt to terminate Eggman so they can take full control of the L.E.X.E.G.G., until Eggman reveals he has taken full control of the Hall of Doom, and created the Metal Legion, a horde of Metal Sonic-esque duplicates of Luthor's teammates which he created using the bio-data scanners he installed in the Hall. As the Legion members battle Eggman and his robots, Catwoman and Rouge, who have been planning to put Eggman and the Legion against each other, assemble Supergirl, Krypto, Cream, Cheese, Big, Aquaman, Starfire, and Blaze, whom they entrust with handling the second location after Sonic's friends and the League return. Meanwhile, Eggman converts the Hall of Doom into a version of the Death Egg called the "Doom Egg". Retreating to an undersea facility (Note: identified off-screen as the Aquatic Base from the 2006 video game Sonic the Hedgehog) in Sonic's world, Luthor uses L.E.X.E.G.G. to release the heroes from the Null Space so they can handle Eggman for the Legion.

While Sonic and his friends battle the Metal Legion, as well as Metal Knightfall, the League members face off against Eggman himself, who proves to be a powerful adversary with his upgraded armor. Despite the struggle, Sonic's team manages to defeat and destroy the Metal Legion by switching targets. Near defeat, Eggman avoids the League and attempts to drop Doom Egg into Earth, only to be stopped by the heroes. Batman contacts Catwoman and Rouge, who had discovered that the L.E.X.E.G.G. gates were secretly designed to draw on each other's dimensional energies from their respective worlds, where one wrong move can destroy them. Luthor reveals he is planning to destroy Sonic's world and take over the League's using L.E.X.E.G.G. if the heroes try and reach him, only for Catwoman to reveal that the second team led by Aquaman is already present to fight Luthor and the Legion.

== Collected editions ==
| Title | Material collected | Publication date | ISBN |
|---|---|---|---|
| DC x Sonic the Hedgehog | DC x Sonic the Hedgehog #1-5 | October 21, 2025 | 978-1799505686 |

== Reception ==
Matthew Aguilar of ComicBook.com gave the first issue of the first miniseries a score of 4.5/5, praising the art and the in-character execution of the crossover aspect. David Harth of ComicBook.com commended the issue's choice to have Batman and Shadow bond over their tragic pasts, given the characters' similarities.
