= Ken Penders =

American comic book creator and writer (born 1958)

- Born: Kenneth W. Penders, II; September 28, 1958 (age 68)
- Areas: Writer, Penciller, Inker, Colourist
- Notable works: Sonic the Hedgehog

Kenneth W. Penders II is an American comics artist and writer. He is known for his work on the Archie Comics series Sonic the Hedgehog and its Knuckles the Echidna spin-off, which he contributed to from 1993 to 2006, and for subsequent copyright disputes involving material from those comics.

After leaving Archie, Penders filed for copyright over works he created for the comics, amounting to hundreds of characters and concepts. Archie sued Penders to retain the rights, however the case was settled out of court with the details never made public. Subsequently, in 2013, Archie rebooted the Sonic comic to remove all of Penders's characters. Penders attempted to sue Sega and EA Games in 2011 for alleged plagiarism of one of his concepts in the 2008 video game Sonic Chronicles: The Dark Brotherhood but was dismissed twice.

In 2010, Penders announced The Lara-Su Chronicles, a graphic novel series that would continue his storyline Mobius: 25 Years Later, using his characters. In June 2024, after 13 years of development, he released The Lara-Su Chronicles: Beginnings, a hardcover compilation of his storyline comics and two preview chapters of the first Lara-Su book, to negative reviews. Penders, his work, and the lawsuits are controversial within the Sonic fandom, with some fans blaming him for the Archie Sonic series' eventual cancellation in 2016.

== Career ==
Prior to working in the comics business, Penders's earliest jobs as a commercial artist included silk screening T-shirts at age 16, serving as a technical illustrator in the US Air Force, and working as a graphics illustrator at a Boston engineering firm. According to Penders, he first got work in the comic book industry working on DC Comics' Who's Who In Star Trek miniseries in 1986, later working on their run of Star Trek: The Next Generation comics in the early 90s. He was hired to work on the latter at the request of regular Star Trek author Robert Greenberger. Penders also accepted a contract illustrating for DC's Captain Atom series after being selected as a finalist in a comic book drawing contest sponsored by Marvel Comics in 1989 and agreeing to visit weekly seminars.

Penders was hired to work on the comic series Sonic the Hedgehog, published by Archie Comics, early into the comic's run in 1993. He served as lead writer for much of the series' early life until he switched focus to working on side-series Knuckles the Echidna, which ran from 1997 until being cancelled due to poor sales in 2000. Penders would still produce stories and artwork for the main title during and after Knuckles's initial run, eventually resuming his role as lead writer of the comic issue #145 onwards after then-lead writer Karl Bollers left the comic in 2005. Penders continued to work on the comic as lead writer until he left Archie in 2006, with his final contribution being inks and lettering for the backstory in issue #169. Outside of the comic, Penders illustrated the cover of the complete series DVD set of Sonic the Hedgehog.

In addition to his works for Sonic and Star Trek, Penders created his own original comic IP for Image Comics in March 2000, The Lost Ones, releasing a single issue before it was cancelled. He has also worked in other media, including producing children's activity books and creating graphics for CD-ROM games. Penders also has credits for storyboards on two episodes of King of the Hill and the movie Bratz: Super Babyz, and created concept art for advertisements for the Motorola Razr.

=== Sonic movie pitch ===
A piece of concept art for Penders's Sonic Armageddon pitch, depicting the characters of Sonic the Hedgehog and Sally Acorn crying over the planet Mobius exploding

In 2002, Sonic the Hedgehog writer Ben Hurst attempted to pitch an animated film continuation of the series, proposing his idea to a Sega executive. Hurst stated the executive was interested in the project, and that he was later called about the film by Penders, at the time lead writer of Archie Comics' Sonic the Hedgehog series; the comic originated as an off-shoot of the animated series. Hurst said of the call that he "generously offered to include [Penders] in the effort and told [Penders his] strategy." However, he stated that after calling Sega back, his contact's demeanor had completely changed, angrily stating that Sega is paid to develop Sonic projects, rather than paying others to do so. Hurst theorized that "Penders had related my strategy to them in a less-than-flattering way... Then [Penders] dropped hints that he would be the writer for a big Sonic Feature Film." Penders would later claim that Hurst "had no idea how Hollywood worked" and has subsequently made negative remarks about Hurst in the years following, even after Hurst's passing. Penders would later pitch Sega his own concept for a movie in 2003 based on the Archie comic, under the name Sonic Armageddon. Not much is known about the pitch, except that the film would have followed Sonic and friends after their home planet of Mobius explodes, something shown in pitch art and stated by Penders himself. According to Penders, he had the support of both X-Men director Larry Houston and Sega of America licensing manager Robert Leffer behind him and cites the opportunity to make the film as to why he left his position as lead writer of the Sonic comic at Archie. He created four pieces of concept art and a homemade pitch video, but the project never materialised due to the death of Leffer and what Penders described as "massive corporate upheaval" at Sega sometime in 2007.

=== The Lara-Su Chronicles ===
In July 2010, after the US Copyright Office had certified his claims over his work for the Sonic the Hedgehog Archie series, Penders announced his intentions to continue the story of Lara-Su, one of his original characters created for Sonic and the in-universe daughter of Knuckles the Echidna, along with the other echidna characters he had created for the Archie comic. In December 2011, Penders announced the continuation would be in the form of a graphic novel series, entitled The Lara-Su Chronicles. The series also is set to feature many other characters created during his time at Archie, with it serving as a continuation of a story he had written for the Sonic comic, "Mobius: 25 Years Later". Penders stated that the series shares the same starting point with his Sonic Armageddon pitch, beginning with the planet Mobius exploding. On March 5, 2014, Penders announced on his Twitter account that his characters were no longer echidna but Echyd'nya, (Note: According to Penders, the word is pronounced as "Eh kid knee-yah".) an alien species. Penders stated reasons for the change were that he needed to make some adjustments to broaden the audience, that he wanted to give longtime fans answers and resolution, and because of the apparent difficulty he has seen with people pronouncing the word "echidna".

Penders stated in a later interview that his goals with The Lara-Su Chronicles are to "[inspire] the next generation to do their own thing as opposed to playing in someone else's sandbox" and sees an effort to finish what he began with "Mobius: 25 Years Later." He also stated that the series may be his last "comics project", and that the series will be seven parts long. Penders plans to release a compilation of all his "Mobius" stories at the 2022 San Diego Comic-Con as a hardcover book entitled The Lara-Su Chronicles: Beginnings, along with an app developed for the series containing a sneak preview of the first book in the series, "Shattered Tomorrows." After 14 years of development, Penders released Beginnings in late June 2024. The compilation contains two preview chapters for The Lara-Su Chronicles' first volume, "The Storm" and "Shattered Tomorrows." Reception among fans was negative, citing an incoherent plot, poor art direction, and overuse of stock images. However, the app for the series has yet to be released.

== Lawsuits ==
=== Archie Comics vs Penders ===
In January 2009, three years after leaving Archie Comics, Penders began filing for copyright of every story, character, and artwork that he had created for Archie's Sonic the Hedgehog comic series and its spin-offs, with the claims certified as of April 2010 by the US Copyright Office. Penders planned on continuing his "Mobius: 25 Years Later, he told the story independently of the publisher and declared that everything using his copyrighted works since issue #160 of the main Sonic comic (Note: The last issue of Sonic in which Penders served as lead writer was issue #159.) was "essentially unauthorised". He had been prompted to do so after fans of his had contacted him asking if he had anything to do with the release of Sonic Chronicles: The Dark Brotherhood, which he did not; Penders alleged the game used concepts and characters similar to those he had written for the comic series.

Archie Comics filed a lawsuit against Penders in the fall of 2010 in an attempt to retain their copyright holdings of his characters and concepts; Archie alleged that Penders had violated his contract with them. However, the only copy of this contract that Archie could produce for the court was a photocopy, which Penders claimed was a forgery; the reproduced nature of the photocopy meant that its validity could be questioned. As Archie was unable to produce the original copy of their contract with Penders, nor those of any other artist who had ever worked on Sonic prior, they were open to future lawsuits. As a result, in the fall of 2012, Archie Comics fired and subsequently replaced its entire legal team. When asked by a judge in a later trial, on the topic of the contracts, if "prior counsel blew it", replacement Archie counsel Joshua Paul agreed.

In 2013, the lawsuit ended with prejudice, in a confidential settlement with Archie Comics where he was allowed to keep over 200 characters of his creation, but was required to make changes to differentiate them from the original material. He would later turn the "Mobius: 25 Years Later" continuation project into The Lara-Su Chronicles. Archie would initially write his characters out of future comics, rewriting issues mid-lawsuit to remove any references to them and not republishing stories involving them, before rebooting the canon entirely to retcon out not only his but any other former writers' original characters and concepts fully. When asked about this reboot in an interview, Penders stated that the retcon wasn't necessary, and that Archie could have continued using his copyrighted characters and concepts to some degree. Penders' settled lawsuit would inspire fellow Archie Sonic alumnus Scott Fulop to file his own copyright infringement lawsuits against Archie and Sega in 2016; Fulop's lawsuits were dismissed a year later due to insufficient evidence.

=== Penders vs SEGA and EA ===
Penders filed a lawsuit against Sega and EA Games in 2011 for alleged copyright infringement in the game Sonic Chronicles: The Dark Brotherhood, which was developed by EA's subsidiary BioWare. In particular, Penders claimed the game had stolen the concept of Nocturnus Clan from his own Dark Legion, along with many other concepts from the Knuckles the Echidna spin-off series he had written—something brought to his attention after fans of his asked if he worked on the game based on the similarities. The case was dismissed without prejudice September 26, 2011, then again in February 2012, after the case had been refiled four days after it was originally dismissed, despite warnings from Judge Otis Wright, who dismissed the case both times. In October 2013, the CA 9th Appellate Court upheld Judge Wright's initial ruling.

=== Other potential lawsuits ===
In October 2015, Penders made a post to his Twitter some interpreted to be directed at Archie Comics, about comic publishers not "believ[ing] in living up to their side of the bargain" and not to "blame [him] for what happens next"; the tweet was believed to be in response to planned reprints by Archie. However, no lawsuits against Archie have been filed by Penders since.

In April 2022, after the release of the Sonic the Hedgehog 2 movie, fans noted the film gave the character of Knuckles the Echidna an on-screen father, something no media for the series had done since Penders's lawsuit had given him copyright of the Archie Comics incarnation of his father, Locke. Penders took to Twitter to state that he believed the character in the film to be a version of Locke, and that he believed another echidna in the film to be another character of his, Enerjak. Upon a user asking him if he had grounds to sue, Penders responded that he would "let the attorneys hash that out", leading many to believe he was preparing for another lawsuit. However, as of 2026, no lawsuit has materialized.

== Bibliography ==
=== As writer ===
==== Archie Comics ====
- Jughead's Double Digest Magazine #41
- Knuckles the Echidna #1-#32
- Princess Sally #1–3 (with Mike Kanterovich)
- Sonic's Friendly Nemesis: Knuckles #1–3
- Sonic Super Special #1–3, #6–7, #11–15
- Sonic the Hedgehog (Archie) #11–22, 24 (with Mike Kanterovich) 27–28, 41–44, 46–50, 53, 58–62, 64–65, 67–69, 72–74, 76–82, 84, 88–98, 101–102, 106–109, 114–118, 120–124, 131–152, 155–159
- Sonic the Hedgehog In Your Face!

==== DC Comics ====
- Star Trek: The Next Generation Special #1

=== As artist ===
==== Archie Comics ====
- Archie's Weird Mysteries #6
- Nights into Dreams #4 (Colors)

==== DC Comics ====
- Advanced Dungeons & Dragons Annual #1
- Captain Atom #41
- Forgotten Realms Annual #1
- Star Trek: The Next Generation #17, 33–35
- The Jaguar #8
- Who's Who in Star Trek #1–2
- Who's Who: Update '87 #2

==== Valiant Comics ====
- The Legend of Zelda #3 (short story "Secrets of the Triforce"), #4 (short story "The Adventurer Link")

==== Malibu Comics ====
- Star Trek: Deep Space Nine #19–20
- Star Trek: Deep Space Nine Celebrity Series – Blood and Honor

==== Other publishers ====
- Cavewoman: Odyssey #1
- The Green Hornet: Solitary Sentinel #1–3
- The Man from U.N.C.L.E. #1–4, 10

=== As writer and artist ===
- Knuckles' Chaotix (Archie Comics)
- Sonic & Knuckles (Archie Comics)
- Sonic Live!
- Sonic the Hedgehog (Archie) #31–36, 38, 45, 99–100
- Sonic the Hedgehog Triple Trouble (Archie Comics)
- Super Sonic vs. Hyper Knuckles
- The Lost Ones #1

== Impact ==
Penders and his work for the Archie Sonic comics are considered controversial within the Sonic the Hedgehog fandom. While his work initially garnered praise during the series' run, his lawsuits against Sega and Archie are regarded as souring his standing with fans, serving as the subject of regular criticism from the fandom. Subsequent retrospective of Penders' work has drawn more criticism. Fans blame the lawsuits for both the eventual cancellation of the Archie Sonic comics and a collection of rumoured mandates limiting all post-lawsuit Sonic comics, although the existence of these mandates has been refuted by former lead Archie and IDW Sonic writer Ian Flynn. (Note: Although Flynn confirmed that guidelines for the property exist, he dismissed the existence of a mandate, stating that an "itemized list on corporate letterhead" of limitations doesn't exist, and implying that the guidelines are not necessarily set in stone.) The outcome of the Archie lawsuit meant that hundreds of characters created by former Archie contractors were removed from the Sonic canon, something that Penders recognizes upset fans, but has stated was a decision made by Archie rather than himself. Content created for Sonic Chronicles has also not appeared in Sonic media since Penders' lawsuits against Sega and EA, likely due to any new material allowing Penders to file a new lawsuit within the Statute of Limitations. Penders social media accounts have been subject to further controversy, as he claimed to have certain plot elements he wished to do but were unable to write, while having arguments with fans over his work and subsequent activities.
