= Muties =

Publication information
- Publisher: Marvel Comics
- Publication date: February to July 2002
- No. of issues: 6
- Main character(s): Mutants

Creative team
- Written by: Karl Bollers

Muties is a six issue miniseries from Marvel Comics which ran from February to July 2002.

It focused on six different Mutants, and each story was essentially self-contained. The miniseries was supposed to show the day-to-day sufferings of mutants, not just those that managed to find their way to the X-Men and Charles Xavier. It was written chiefly by Karl Bollers with different artists doing different issues.

== "The Changeling" ==
This is the story of Jared, a boy who is both mentally and physically bullied by both peers and his father. One of his few friends is Kate, a pretty and popular girl with whom Jared is in love. Although Jared is the main focus of the story, he is not the mutant. He is, however, highly intelligent, and dreams of running away with Kate. Unfortunately, his dreams come crashing down.

== "Toy Soldiers" ==
The story of Seiji, a young telekinetic boy from Japan, whose powers and imagination may just save his life.

== "Arrested Development" ==
The story of teenager, Riek, who discovers he can slow the world, by willing his heart beat to slow. Riek lives in tumultuous Uganda, where kidnappings happen frequently and violence is unnervingly common. Unfortunately, Riek and his fellow students, along with some teachers are held captive. During this time, Riek must come to grips with his power, and choose whether to save the lives of his friends and fellow hostages and take the lives of their captors, or to refuse to do what he is good at, and what he hates: to kill.

== "Love, Jisa" ==
Once more writing from the perspective of the non-mutant, this issue focuses on a young girl living in Rio de Janeiro, with her strict Catholic family. She flouts their beliefs and hooks up with the hunky Laolo, who she thinks loves her. However, as her family kicks her out, and she comes to need Laolo, she discovers that he is not all she thought he was. Distraught, pregnant, and alone, Jisa turns to her only friend, Nata, the young female bouncer (at the club where she first met Laolo), a charming, loving woman with unusual body density.

== "Third Eye Blind" ==
The story of a fresh faced young mutant, who gets sucked into the terrifying, addictive world of drugs. Her third eye, situated in the middle of her forehead, gives her some unique powers.

== "The Patriot Game" ==
The final story in this miniseries brings us to Northern Ireland. Liam, a mutant with the ability to blow things up, is dragged unwillingly into the turmoil and terrorism that has disturbed Northern Ireland for many years. Unwilling, Liam resists with all his might, disgusted and loathing of the terrorists who simply want to use his mutant powers to better their own position.
