= List of Sonic the Hedgehog printed media =

Sonic the Hedgehog has been the subject of many different spinoffs across printed media.

== Comic books ==
Several comic books have been released, each establishing a different storyline focused around Sonic.

- Sonic the Hedgehog (promotional comic book released in 1991 and featured in Disney Adventures, Electronic Monthly and Sega Visions magazines)
- Sonic the Hedgehog (Archie Comics, US), 1992–2016
- Sonic the Comic (Fleetway, UK), 1993–2002
- Sonic Adventures (La Sirène, France), 1994
- Knuckles the Echidna (Archie Comics, US), 1997–2000
- Sonic X (Archie Comics, US), 2005–2009
- Sonic Universe (Archie Comics, US), 2009–2017
- Sonic Boom (Archie Comics, US), 2014–2015
- Sonic Comic (Japan), 2016, a webcomic
- Sonic Forces: Digital Comic (US and Japan), 2017
- Sonic the Hedgehog (IDW Publishing, US), 2018–present
- DC x Sonic the Hedgehog (DC Comics, US), 2025, a crossover miniseries between Sonic and the DC Universe
- DC x Sonic the Hedgehog: Metal Legion (DC Comics, US), 2026
- Sonic the Hedgehog X Godzilla (IDW Publishing, US), 2026, a crossover miniseries between Sonic and Godzilla

Exclusively in the United Kingdom was a short-lived Sunday comic strip and a series of Christmas annuals. Whilst there were some slight connections (both projects occasionally featured the work of regular Sonic the Comic artist Richard Elson), the projects were largely separate from one another, with the Sunday comic and annuals preferring self-contained gag strips over Sonic the Comic's continuing plot lines and more mature stance.

== Gamebooks ==
A series of six Sonic the Hedgehog Adventure Gamebooks were published in the UK between 1993 and 1996 by Puffin under the Fantail label.

- Book 1 – Metal City Mayhem, James Wallis (ISBN 0-14-090391-7)
- Book 2 – Zone Rangers, James Wallis (ISBN 0-14-090392-5)
- Book 3 – Sonic v Zonik, Nigel Gross and Jon Sutherland (ISBN 0-14-090406-9)
- Book 4 – The Zone Zapper, Nigel Gross and Jon Sutherland (ISBN 0-14-090407-7)
- Book 5 – Theme Park Panic, Marc Gascoigne and Jonathan Green (ISBN 0-14-037847-2)
- Book 6 – Stormin' Sonic, Marc Gascoigne and Jonathan Green (ISBN 0-14-037848-0)

== Manga ==
Several Sonic the Hedgehog manga series have been published in Japan and as of 2023 were never officially published outside Japan, nor in any language other than Japanese. In addition, Sonic fan-made dōjinshi made by a variety of artists (including Kōshi Rikudō) have also been released.

=== Sonic the Hedgehog Story Comic (1991) ===
A three-chapter promotional tie in to Sonic the Hedgehog distributed alongside the Japanese magazine Mega Drive Fan. It serves as a short adaptation and introduction to the game, and features unused concepts from this one such as Sonic's rock band, making it the first appearance of Vector the Crocodile.

=== Sonic the Hedgehog (1992-1994) ===
In 1992, Shogakukan published the eponymous Sonic the Hedgehog manga. The manga was written and conceptualized by Kenji Terada and it was illustrated by Sango Morimoto (森本サンゴ, Morimoto Sango). The manga details the story of a hedgehog boy named Nicky who can turn into the superhero Sonic the Hedgehog. It also featured Miles "Tails" Prower and Doctor Eggman as well as introduced Amy Rose and Charmy Bee into the franchise before their debut in video games.

=== Dash & Spin: Super Fast Sonic (2003-2005) ===
Dash & Spin: Super Fast Sonic (ダッシュ&スピン 超速ソニック Dasshu ando Supin: Chōsoku Sonikku) is a serialized manga illustrated by Santa Harukaze (春風邪 三太 Harukaze Santa). It was printed via the Japanese manga magazine CoroCoro Comic published by Shogakukan, famous for publishing many manga adaptations of video games (including adaptations of Super Mario Bros. and Rockman.EXE (MegaMan NT Warrior).

Dash & Spin' contains several short stories, including omake (extra) koma stories, published as an anthology and later collected in two tankōbon (volumes). Volume 1 was published in July 2003, while Volume 2 was published in February 2005. The stories are often very slapstick. Dash & Spin includes many Sonic the Hedgehog characters, including Sonic the Hedgehog, Miles "Tails" Prower, Knuckles the Echidna, Amy Rose, Shadow the Hedgehog, and Doctor Eggman.

=== The Jet Black Hedgehog: Shadow the Hedgehog (2024-2025) ===
The Jet Black Hedgehog: Shadow the Hedgehog (漆黒のハリネズミ：シャドウ・ザ・ヘッジホッグ, Shikkoku no harinezumi: Shadō za Hejjihoggu?) is a manga based on the Sonic the Hedgehog series and was published on 12 September 2024. The manga is being published by CoroCoro Comic. It centers around the life of Shadow the Hedgehog.

Its goal is to promote Sonic X Shadow Generations as well as introduce a new generation of Japanese Sonic fans to the series.

== Novels ==
- Stay Sonic by Mike Pattenden developed the "Kintobor origin", first introduced in the Sonic the Hedgehog promotional comic book, in much greater detail. This background was used as the basis of most subsequent UK Sonic stories, including Sonic the Comic. The book is partly fiction and partly reference, with tips for all the levels and badniks of both the Genesis/Megadrive and GameGear/Master System Sonic 2. The book also features some interviews with then-contemporary British celebrities (including singers Cathy Dennis, Richard Fairbrass from Right Said Fred, Zac Foley from EMF, Tom Hingley from Inspiral Carpets and Richie James from Manic Street Preachers). There are also blueprints for the Egg-O-Matic piloted by Dr. Robotnik and a fictional interview with Sonic himself.

James Wallis, Carl Sargent and Marc Gascoigne, under the collective pseudonym "Martin Adams", wrote four Sonic the Hedgehog novels based on the origin established in Stay Sonic. They were published in the UK by Virgin Publishing.

- Book 1 – Sonic the Hedgehog in Robotnik's Laboratory 1993 (by Sargent) – Sonic attempts to rescue his friends from the eponymous lab.
- Book 2 – Sonic the Hedgehog in the Fourth Dimension 1993 (by Wallis) – Sonic and Tails try to prevent Robotnik from altering history, encountering the Organisers; human scientists who maintain the laws of Time and Space, and helping them against the mythos creatures, paramilitary mythological creatures who are trying to exist in reality. Sonic briefly altered history so Robotnik was never formed, but had to change it back to stop the mythos creatures altering the Big Bang.
- Book 3 – Sonic the Hedgehog and the Silicon Warriors 1993 (by Wallis) – Robotnik imprisons Mobians inside a vast computer system, forcing Sonic and Tails to battle thinly veiled versions of other computer game characters ("Road Warriors II"). It featured many puns and frequent breachings of the fourth wall, with Sonic directly talking to the reader on several occasions.
- Book 4 – Sonic the Hedgehog in Castle Robotnik 1994 (by Sargent) – Robotnik creates a robotic duplicate of Sonic and situates himself in a classic horror movie villain castle, protected by likewise common horror movie creatures.

Michael Teitelbaum's series of Sonic novels published by Troll Associates:

- Sonic the Hedgehog 1993
- Sonic the Hedgehog: Robotnik's Revenge 1994
- Sonic the Hedgehog: Fortress of Fear 1995
- Sonic the Hedgehog: Friend or Foe? 1995
- Sonic & Knuckles 1995
- Sonic Xtreme 1996
- Sonic Activity Book 1995

Sonic X novels published by Grosset & Dunlap:

- Meteor Shower Messenger – Paul Ruditis 2005
- Spaceship Blue Typhoon – Diana Gallagher 2005
- Aqua Planet – Charlotte Fullerton 2006
- Dr. Eggman Goes to War – Charlotte Fullerton 2006
- Battle at Ice Pallace – Charlotte Fullerton 2006
- Desperately Seeking Sonic – Charlotte Fullerton 2007

The pocket-sized novelizations of the Sonic the Hedgehog live-action films, by Kiel Phegley, published by Penguin Young Readers Group:

- Sonic the Hedgehog: The Official Movie Novelization 2020
- Sonic the Hedgehog 2: The Official Movie Novelization 2022
- Sonic the Hedgehog 3: The Official Movie Novelization 2024

== Others ==
- Where's Sonic? and Where's Sonic Now? were two books using a similar idea to the Where's Wally?/Where's Waldo? series, each page presenting the reader with a different puzzle inspired by a level from the Sonic games. Published by Ladybird Books Ltd.
- Look and Find Sonic the Hedgehog Another book similar to Where's Waldo; each page is a puzzle with hidden objects and characters from the SatAM storyline, but in locations from Sonic games on the Genesis. (ISBN 0-7853-1139-4)
- A series of other children's books were written by Ladybird. These include two puzzle books, a coloring book and the picture books Robotnik's Oil and The Invisible Robotnik. Sonic the Story was a book explaining Sonic's transformation from brown to blue.
- A trilogy of children's picture books were published by Golden Books, written by John Michlig and illustrated by Art Mawhinney. Titles include Up Against a Wall, The Secret Admirer and Sonic's Shoes Blues. By 1994, the series had sold 550,000 copies, including 250,000 copies of Sonic's Shoes Blues and 300,000 copies of Sonic's Secret Admirer.
- In the UK, two Sonic the Hedgehog yearbooks were published in 1991 and 1992 by Grandreams Limited. These featured one-shot comics normally involving Sonic foiling Dr. Robotnik's plans (but included one Shinobi comic), Sega game reviews and other novelty Sonic and Sega-related features such as an "interview with Sonic".
- Two 32-page softback books featuring early strips from Sonic the Comic were published in the UK in 1994, titled "Sonic the Hedgehog Beats the Badniks" and "Sonic the Hedgehog Spin Attack".
- The official Japanese Sonic the Hedgehog website, Sonic Channel, publishes year-long web serials since 2021, in which a new entry and accompanying artwork are posted monthly. The 2024 web serial Karendā ōgiri features five scenarios contributed by viewers for each entry.
