= Sonic the Hedgehog (IDW Publishing) =

US comic book series

- Cover A of Sonic the Hedgehog #1 (April 4, 2018); Art by Tyson Hesse

Publication information
- Publisher: IDW Publishing (Licensed by Sega of America)
- Schedule: Monthly
- Genre: Action-adventure; Science fiction
- Publication date: April 4, 2018 – present
- No. of issues: 91 (Main issues); 4 (Annuals); 21 (Miniseries); 17 (Misc. one-shots, including Anniversary Specials)
- Main character: Sonic the Hedgehog

Creative team
- Written by: List: Ian Flynn; Evan Stanley; Iasmin Omar Ata; Daniel Barnes; Mark Bouchard; Gigi Dutreix; Gale Galligan; Caleb Goellner; Sarah Graley; Aaron Hammerstrom; Sam King; Nigel Kitching; James Kochalka; Clint McElroy; Griffin McElroy; Justin McElroy; Travis McElroy; Ian Mutchler; Kiel Phegley; Cavan Scott; India Swift; Josh Trujillo
- Artists: List: Tyson Hesse; Rafa Knight; Edwin Huang; Kieran Gates; Devin Kraft; Ryan Jampole; Yui Karasuno; Min Ho Kim; Mark Hughes; Abigail Starling
- Pencillers: List: Tracy Yardley; Tyson Hesse; Nathalie Fourdraine; Evan Stanley; Adam Bryce Thomas; Jamal Peppers; Jennifer Hernandez; Jonathan Gray; Lamar Wells; Jack Lawrence; Diana Skelly; Priscilla Tramontano; Aaron Hammerstrom; Abigail Bulmer; Thomas Rothlisberger; Natalie Haines; Mauro Fonseca
- Inkers: List: Bob Smith; Jim Amash; Adam Bryce Thomas; Jennifer Hernandez; Gigi Dutriex; Rick Mack; Evan Stanley; Tracy Yardley
- Letterers: List: Corey Breen; Shawn Lee; Nathan Widick; Ed Dukeshire
- Colorists: List: Matt Herms; Adam Bryce Thomas; Heather Breckel; Reggie Graham; Leonardo Ito; Elaina Unger; Valentina Pinto; Joana Lafuente
- Editors: List: Megan Brown; Thea Cheuk; Riley Farmer; Joe Hughes; Lauren LaPera; David Mariotte; Bixie Mathieu; Nick Niño

Sonic the Hedgehog is an ongoing American comic book series based on the Sega video game franchise, published by IDW Publishing.

It is the second US licensed comic book adaption of the franchise after Archie Comics' Sonic the Hedgehog series, and the third overall licensed comic book series after the British Sonic the Comic series by Fleetway Publications. Unlike those series, which had their own continuity, IDW's Sonic the Hedgehog is set in the same continuity as the game series, beginning after the events of Sonic Forces.

== Publication history ==
2017 Promotional artwork from New York Comic Con by Tyson Hesse, depicting (counterclockwise from bottom right): Sonic, Knuckles, Amy and Tails

On July 21, 2017, IDW Publishing announced a deal with Sega of America to produce a new series of Sonic comics after the cancellation of the Sonic the Hedgehog comic series by Archie Comics after a 24-year run. The new series began with a four-week-long event where the first four issues were released each week in April 2018, followed by a monthly release of subsequent issues starting in May 2018. Archie Sonic writer Ian Flynn was later confirmed to return as the series' lead writer, alongside artist Tyson Hesse. In an interview with Game Informer, Flynn established that IDW's Sonic continuity is separate from Archie's.

During the 2017 New York Comic Con, Ian Flynn confirmed that both old and new characters would be featured in the series, hinting that characters from the games and the original comics might possibly return. In January 2018, IDW revealed that Tracy Yardley, who originally worked on Archie's Sonic the Hedgehog comics, would be one of the pencillers for the IDW series.

On April 14, 2020, it was announced that Evan Stanley, one of the series' artists, would be writing for the series.

In June 2023, Lore Manager Chris Hernandez confirmed that the comics are canon to the games.

In November 2023, Sonic editor David Mariotte announced that the series would be taking a hiatus in 2024 until the miniseries Sonic the Hedgehog: Fang the Hunter is concluded.

On July 3, 2024, a crossover between the Sonic comics and an unknown third-party franchise was announced to be in the works, with more details to be revealed in the coming months. During the Sonic Central broadcast on September 24, 2024, it was announced that the Sonic franchise would cross over with the DC Universe in a 5-issue miniseries written by Ian Flynn that would feature Team Sonic teaming up with the Justice League. The DC x Sonic the Hedgehog series was published from March to July 2025. On February 20, 2026, a five-issue sequel miniseries, DC x Sonic the Hedgehog: Metal Legion, was announced. Metal Legion was published from May to September 2026.

On April 25, 2025, IDW Publishing began releasing the comic series on Webtoon.

In July 2025, IDW teased the debut of Sage from Sonic Frontiers in issue #84. Evan Stanley confirmed that this issue would take place after Frontiers. She later said that it would not be the first post-Frontiers issue and the best place to put Frontiers "without causing major continuity hiccups" was before issue #68, however she acknowledged that there were unavoidable continuity issues with any placement.

On February 23, 2026, a crossover comic book miniseries with IDW Publishing's Godzilla comic series, Sonic the Hedgehog X Godzilla, was announced.

== Synopsis ==
Following the war over Eggman's global conquest, (Note: Depicted in Sonic Forces) the doctor is found by the Chaotix to have lost his memory and ended up in a remote village where he has taken on the more friendly moniker of Mr. Tinker. Sonic meets new allies Tangle and Whisper, and learns that Neo Metal Sonic is now leading the Badniks, plotting to take over the world in Eggman's stead. While Sonic and his friends fight Neo Metal Sonic and his army on Angel Island, an Eggman admirer named Dr. Starline kidnaps Mr. Tinker and successfully reverts him back to Eggman after a defeated Metal Sonic returns to him. Considering the war's last loose end tied, Knuckles disbands the Resistance, which Amy reorganizes into the Restoration.

While Tangle helps Whisper apprehend her former comrade turned criminal Mimic, Eggman hatches a new scheme involving the Metal Virus, which turns organic life into mindless robots dubbed "zombots", with several heroes succumbing to the infection. The virus quickly mutates beyond Eggman's control; Starline brings in the Deadly Six in hopes that they can control the zombots, but they betray him. This leads to a falling out between Starline and Eggman and forces Eggman to help an infected Sonic and his friends cure the world. Tangle's childhood friend Jewel subsequently assumes leadership of the Restoration, relieving Amy.

As the world rebuilds in the Metal Virus' wake, Sonic and company set out to fix E-123 Omega, whose body was destroyed by zombots. Sonic and Tails investigate an Eggman base to find blueprints while Rouge, Amy, Cream, and Cheese enter a Chao race to win parts; the former group discovers a peaceful Badnik created by Mr. Tinker named Belle, while the latter group and Shadow come into conflict with former crime boss Clutch. Meanwhile, Starline, hoping to regain Eggman's respect and rejoin him by proving his own superiority, sets his own plans in motion by allying with villains like Zavok and Mimic and stalking Sonic's friends. Zavok reunites the Deadly Six, and they attack the Restoration's home base, but are defeated and banished to their homeworld of Lost Hex.

From the bio-data he has collected, Starline creates Surge and Kitsunami, two cyborgs meant to replace Sonic and Tails and end the status quo between them and Eggman. Upon learning how they were created and not finding any trace of their past, Surge and Kit begin plotting against everyone. Starline, oblivious, tries to conquer the Eggman Empire's new ever-expanding capital, Eggperial City, and lures Sonic, Tails and Belle there. However, Eggman defeats Starline and leaves him to die, while Kit flees with Surge in tow after several defeats incapacitate her. Eggman himself is subsequently defeated when Eggperial City is destroyed by the Restoration and their allies, including the newly reformed Diamond Cutters consisting of Tangle, Whisper, and Jewel's aide-de-camp Lanolin.

Clutch, seeking to revive his criminal empire, hires Rough, Tumble, Mimic, Surge, and Kit to infiltrate the Restoration so he can take it over. After conning Jewel into a business partnership, Clutch sponsors an Extreme Gear tournament to build publicity. His plan is foiled with secret help from Eggman, provoked by the tournament's mocking advertisements, and unexpected help from Surge and Kit, having second thoughts after experiencing heroic acclaim. Publicly exposed, Clutch endangers Central City out of spite and tries to escape, but is stopped and defeated. The Restoration sacrifice their own headquarters to save the city, while the other villains scatter as Eggman captures Clutch. In the aftermath, Jewel resigns as leader of the Restoration, the Diamond Cutters disband, and Eggman secretly enslaves Clutch and seizes his assets to profit off his own waste. Tangle, Whisper, and Silver try to recapture Mimic, but he dies in a failed suicide attack against them. Unbeknownst to all, these events have been observed by a mysterious figure in possession of the Chaos Emeralds.

== Characters ==
Cover RI 1:10 of Sonic the Hedgehog #75 (December 18, 2024) featuring many characters from the comic series Art by Nathalie Fourdraine

New characters to the series include:

- Tangle the Lemur: An energetic ring-tailed lemur who can elongate her tail for use in combat.
- Whisper the Wolf: A reserved wolf who uses a Wisp-powered rifle and becomes Tangle's best friend. She is the last survivor of an anti-Eggman mercenary group called the Diamond Cutters.
- Belle the Tinkerer: A clumsy but kindhearted marionette-like robot created by Eggman when he was "Mr. Tinker".
- Jewel the Beetle: A cautious, worryful beetle museum curator and Tangle's childhood friend, who leads the Restoration between the Metal Virus plague and the Clean Sweepstakes tournament.
- Lanolin the Sheep: An uptight and strict sheep who joins the Restoration after Sonic and Amy saved her village, later becoming the leader of the second iteration of the Diamond Cutters. She has a Wisp companion named Maggie.
- Surge the Tenrec: A punkish lowland streaked tenrec cybernetically enhanced by Starline to be Sonic's doppelgänger. Like Sonic, she can move at superhuman speeds. Her name also references the electrical powers that she displays. She is deeply traumatized by Starline's experiments and has no memory of her prior life.
- Kitsunami "Kit" the Fennec: A somber fennec fox cybernetically enhanced by Starline to be Tails' doppelgänger and Surge's sidekick. Kit possesses the ability to control water. His name is a portmanteau of the word Kitsune, a reference to his powers making it seem as though he has multiple tails, echoing the multi-tailed fox of Japanese myth, and the word Tsunami, which denotes a massive tidal event. He, too, is traumatized by Starline's experiments and has no memory of his prior life.
- Doctor Starline: A platypus scientist who admires Eggman, later creating Surge and "Kit" to oppose Sonic. He dies at Eggman's hands after trying to take over his empire.
- Clutch the Opossum: An opossum crime boss who collects Eggtech and uses it for personal profit.
- Rough the Skunk and Tumble the Skunk: A pair of trouble-making skunk brothers and former mercenaries who have worked with Eggman, Doctor Starline and Clutch.
- Mimic the Octopus: A shapeshifting mimic octopus and former comrade of Whisper who betrayed his team to Eggman. He assumes the form of "Duo the Cat" while infiltrating the Restoration. He dies in a failed suicide attack against Whisper, Tangle, and Silver when they try to recapture him.
- Nite the Owl: An owl who is a radio host and is in a relationship with Don. He and Don are friends with the Chaotix and sometimes help them with their cases.
- Don the Rooster: A rooster who is the custodian at Nite's radio station and is in a relationship with him. He and Nite are friends with the Chaotix and sometimes help them with their cases.
- Soleil the Sugar Glider: A sugar glider jester who hails from the Celestial Troupe, a family of acrobat circus performers, and idolizes Sonic. Stress related to failing to meet the Celestial Troupe's standards have caused Soleil to develop a mischievous split-personality alter ego called "Lunar".
- Blackwood the Ermine: An suave and manipulative ermine who rules over Sylvania Castle Zone as its lord. He uses hypnotizers in his gauntlets, provided by a mysterious benefactor, to control his subjects.
- Dapple the Doe: A reindeer who was brainwashed into serving as a maid in Blackwood's domain but developed a resistance to his control. She becomes an ally to Silver and Blaze in order to save her people.

== Publications ==
=== Series ===
Title	Issue(s)	Start date	End date	Note
Sonic the Hedgehog	1–	April 4, 2018	—N/a	Began weekly publications in April 2018, then became monthly in May 2018. Features Sonic, Tails and friends battling the forces of Doctor Eggman and other foes. The series is set after the events of Sonic Forces, with the events of Sonic Frontiers taking place between issues #67 and #68.
Sonic the Hedgehog: Tangle & Whisper	0–4	April 24, 2019	December 11, 2019	Miniseries featuring the adventures of two original characters from the main series, Tangle and Whisper.
Sonic the Hedgehog: Bad Guys	1–4	October 7, 2020	December 16, 2020	Miniseries centered on Dr. Starline and his crew consisting of Zavok, Mimic, Rough, and Tumble.
Sonic the Hedgehog: Imposter Syndrome	1–4	November 17, 2021	May 11, 2022	Miniseries focusing on new antagonists Surge and Kit, as well as their creator, Doctor Starline.
Sonic the Hedgehog: Scrapnik Island	1–4	October 19, 2022	January 18, 2023	Psychological horror miniseries focusing on Sonic and Tails trapped on an island full of disused Badniks, including Mecha Sonic and Mecha Knuckles.
Sonic the Hedgehog: Fang the Hunter (Note: Classic era)	1–4	January 17, 2024	May 1, 2024	A mini-series set in the classic era featuring Fang the Hunter and his mercenary group, the Hooligans. This miniseries takes place before the game Sonic Superstars.

=== One-shots ===
Title	Publication date	Note
Team Sonic Racing	December 5, 2018	A prequel to the 2019 game Team Sonic Racing.
Sonic the Hedgehog Annual 2019	May 1, 2019	An annual edition comic which contains 5 new stories.
Sonic the Hedgehog Annual 2020	July 8, 2020	An annual edition comic which contains 6 new stories set during the Metal Virus saga.
Sonic the Hedgehog 30th Anniversary Special	June 23, 2021	A one-shot special in celebration of the 30th anniversary of the Sonic the Hedgehog series.
Sonic the Hedgehog Free Comic Book Day 2021	August 14, 2021	A Free Comic Book Day special edition comic.
Sonic the Hedgehog 2: The Official Movie Pre-quill (Note: Separate continuity)	April 5, 2022	A prequel to the 2022 film.
Sonic the Hedgehog Free Comic Book Day 2022	May 7, 2022	A Free Comic Book Day special edition comic.
Sonic the Hedgehog Annual 2022	August 17, 2022	An annual edition comic that contains 6 new stories about odd pair-ups.
Sonic the Hedgehog: Tails' 30th Anniversary Special	November 16, 2022	A one-shot comic book special celebrating the 30th anniversary of Miles "Tails" Prower.
Sonic the Hedgehog: 5th Anniversary Edition	April 5, 2023	A one-shot comic book special celebrating the 5th anniversary of the IDW Sonic the Hedgehog comic series. It reprints #1 and adds a new story based on it.
Sonic the Hedgehog: Endless Summer	August 30, 2023	Part of the "IDW Endless Summer" event.
Sonic the Hedgehog's 900th Adventure	September 13, 2023	A one-shot comic book special celebrating the entire Sonic the Hedgehog comic book run, including the Fleetway and Archie comics.
Sonic the Hedgehog: Amy's 30th Anniversary Special	September 27, 2023	A one-shot comic book special celebrating the 30th anniversary of Amy Rose.
Sonic the Hedgehog: Halloween Special	October 11, 2023	A Halloween one-shot comic book special focusing on the Chaotix.
Sonic the Hedgehog: Winter Jam	December 13, 2023	A Winter one-shot comic book special focused on Sonic and his friends competing for a Chaos Emerald.
Sonic the Hedgehog: Spring Broken	June 26, 2024	A Spring one-shot comic book special.
Sonic The Hedgehog Annual 2024	October 9, 2024	An annual edition comic that contains 3 new stories about varying worldviews.
Sonic the Hedgehog: Knuckles' 30th Anniversary Special	November 20, 2024	A one-shot comic book special celebrating the 30th anniversary of Knuckles the Echidna. This one-shot takes place after the events of Sonic Superstars.
Sonic the Hedgehog: Chaotix's 30th Anniversary Special	October 22, 2025	A one-shot comic book special celebrating the 30th anniversary of the Chaotix.
Sonic the Hedgehog: Sonic Racing CrossWorlds	March 4, 2026	A prequel to the 2025 game Sonic Racing: CrossWorlds.
Sonic the Hedgehog: 35th Anniversary Special	July 8, 2026	A one-shot comic book special celebrating the 35th anniversary of the Sonic the Hedgehog series.

=== Reprints ===
==== Trade paperbacks ====
- Sonic the Hedgehog, Vol. 1: Fallout! (September 18, 2018): Reprint of #1–4
- Sonic the Hedgehog, Vol. 2: The Fate of Dr. Eggman (February 19, 2019): Reprint of #5–8
- Team Sonic Racing Plus Deluxe Turbo Championship Edition (May 22, 2019): Reprint of the story featured in Team Sonic Racing One-Shot and bonus features
- Sonic the Hedgehog: Bonds of Friendship (2019): A Scholastic-exclusive collection of several reprinted issues in the Sonic the Hedgehog comic series
- Sonic the Hedgehog, Vol. 3: Battle For Angel Island (July 23, 2019): Reprint of #9–12
- Sonic the Hedgehog, Vol. 4: Infection (September 3, 2019): Reprint of #13–16
- Sonic the Hedgehog, Vol. 5: Crisis City (February 11, 2020): Reprint of #17–20
- Sonic the Hedgehog: Tangle & Whisper (April 14, 2020): Reprint of Tangle & Whisper issues #1–4 and the 2019 Annual
- Sonic the Hedgehog, Vol. 6: The Last Minute (June 23, 2020): Reprint of #21–24
- Sonic the Hedgehog, Vol. 7: All or Nothing (December 8, 2020): Reprint of #25–29
- Sonic the Hedgehog, Vol. 8: Out of the Blue (March 30, 2021): Reprint of #30–32 and the 2020 Annual
- Sonic the Hedgehog: Bad Guys (June 2, 2021): Reprint of Bad Guys issues #1–4
- Sonic the Hedgehog, Vol. 9: Chao Races & Badnik Bases (January 11, 2022): Reprint of #33–36
- Sonic the Hedgehog, Vol. 10: Test Run! (March 8, 2022): Reprint of #37–40
- Sonic the Hedgehog, Vol. 11: Zeti Hunt! (June 7, 2022): Reprint of #41-44
- Sonic the Hedgehog, Vol. 12: Trial by Fire (September 13, 2022): Reprint of #45–49
- Sonic the Hedgehog: Imposter Syndrome (October 11, 2022): Reprint of Imposter Syndrome #1–4
- Sonic the Hedgehog, Vol. 13: Battle for the Empire (February 7, 2023): Reprint of #50-51, FCBD 2022 and the 2022 Annual
- Sonic the Hedgehog, Vol. 14: Overpowered (June 20, 2023): Reprint of #52-56
- Sonic the Hedgehog: Scrapnik Island (August 29, 2023): Reprint of Scrapnik Island #1–4
- Sonic The Hedgehog: Seasons of Chaos (October 10, 2023): Reprint of the 30th Anniversary Special and FCBD 2021
- Sonic the Hedgehog, Vol. 15: Urban Warfare (October 24, 2023): Reprint of #57-61
- Sonic the Hedgehog, Vol. 16: Misadventures (April 23, 2024): Reprint of #62-66
- Sonic the Hedgehog, Vol. 17: Adventure Awaits (October 22, 2024): Reprint of #67-68, Endless Summer, 900th Adventure and Halloween Special
- Sonic the Hedgehog: Fang the Hunter (November 19, 2024): Reprint of Fang the Hunter #1-4, along with the Sonic Superstars: Fang's Big Break digital comic
- Sonic the Hedgehog, Vol. 18: Extreme Competition (April 22, 2025): Reprint of #69-71, Winter Jam and Spring Broken
- Sonic the Hedgehog, Vol. 19: Collision Course (August 19, 2025): Reprint of #72-75
- Sonic the Hedgehog, Vol. 20: Cause & Effect (December 2, 2025): Reprint of #76-78 and the 2024 Annual
- Sonic the Hedgehog, Vol. 21: Reprise (April 21, 2026): Reprint of #79-83 and Chaotix's 30th Anniversary Special
- Sonic the Hedgehog, Vol. 22: Stealing the Show (December 22, 2026): Reprint of #84-88 and Sonic the Hedgehog: Sonic Racing CrossWorlds
- Sonic the Hedgehog, Vol. 23: Smoke & Mirrors (June 08, 2027): Reprint of #89–93

==== The IDW Collection ====
- Sonic the Hedgehog: The IDW Collection, Vol. 1 (June 29, 2021): Reprint of #1–12
- Sonic the Hedgehog: The IDW Collection, Vol. 2 (March 15, 2022): Reprint of #13–20, the 2019 Annual and Tangle & Whisper #1-4
- Sonic the Hedgehog: The IDW Collection, Vol. 3 (March 14, 2023): Reprint of #21–32 and the 2020 Annual
- Sonic the Hedgehog: The IDW Collection, Vol. 4 (March 12, 2024): Reprint of #33-40 and Bad Guys #1-4
- Sonic the Hedgehog: The IDW Collection, Vol. 5 (March 18, 2025): Reprint of #41-50 and Imposter Syndrome #1-4
- Sonic the Hedgehog: The IDW Collection, Vol. 6 (May 26, 2026): Reprint of #51-56, FCBD 2022, the 2022 Annual, and Scrapnik Island #1-4
- Sonic the Hedgehog: The IDW Collection, Vol. 7 (March 16, 2027): Reprint of #57-68, 900th Adventure, Endless Summer, and Halloween Special

==== On The Go ====
- Sonic the Hedgehog: On The Go, Vol. 1 (September 30, 2025): Reprint of #1–12
- Sonic the Hedgehog: On The Go, Vol. 2 (February 10, 2026): Reprint of #13–20, the 2019 Annual and Tangle & Whisper #1-4
- Sonic the Hedgehog: On The Go, Vol. 3 (June 9, 2026): Reprint of #21–32 and the 2020 Annual
- Sonic the Hedgehog: On The Go, Vol. 4 (October 6, 2026): Reprint of #33-40 and Bad Guys #1-4
- Sonic the Hedgehog: On The Go, Vol. 5 (February 9, 2027): Reprint of #41-50 and Imposter Syndrome #1-4

==== Compilations ====
- Sonic the Hedgehog: Sonic & Tails: Best Buds Forever (February 23, 2022): Reprint of stories from #1, #13, #34 and #35
- Sonic the Hedgehog: Knuckles' Greatest Hits (October 24, 2023): Reprint of stories from #3, #10, #11, FCBD 2022, and the 2022 Annual featuring Knuckles
- Sonic the Hedgehog: Best of Shadow (January 22, 2025): Reprint of stories from #6, #36, #59 and #61 featuring Shadow
- Sonic the Hedgehog: Best of Amy (January 26, 2027): Reprint of stories from #2, #15, #45 and #62 featuring Amy

==== Other ====
- Sonic the Hedgehog Halloween ComicFest 2019 (October 26, 2019): Reprint of #1 for Halloween ComicFest 2019
- Sonic the Hedgehog 30th Anniversary Celebration: The Deluxe Edition (November 9, 2021): Reprint of the 30th Anniversary Special and FCBD 2021
- Comics Giveaway Day 2026: Sonic the Hedgehog #1 (May 2,2026): Reprint of #1 for Comics Giveaway Day 2026
- Sonic the Hedgehog: Knuckles' Anniversary Special (July 7, 2026): Reprint of Knuckles' 30th Anniversary Special
- Sonic the Hedgehog: Amy's Anniversary Special (September 22, 2026): Reprint of Amy's 30th Anniversary Special
- Sonic the Hedgehog: 35th Anniversary Special – The Deluxe Edition (December 15, 2026): Reprint of Sonic the Hedgehog: 35th Anniversary Special
- Sonic the Hedgehog: Tails' Anniversary Special (July 13, 2027): Reprint of Tails' 30th Anniversary Special

=== Art collections ===
- Sonic The Hedgehog: The IDW Comic Art Collection (October 24, 2023): Collection featuring various art pieces from throughout the comics and concept art of IDW original characters.
- Sonic the Hedgehog: The IDW Comic Covers, Vol. 1 (October 7, 2025): Hardcover collection of cover art from the first 75 issues, plus annuals, specials, and miniseries.

=== Boxsets ===
- Sonic the Hedgehog Boxset (June 27, 2018): Contains #1-4
- Sonic the Hedgehog Boxset, Vol. 1-3 (October 15, 2024): Contains trade paperback volumes 1-3

=== Sonic Prime ===
- Sonic The Hedgehog: Sonic Prime, Vol. 1 (May 13, 2025): Contains adaptations of Sonic Prime season 1 episodes 1-2
- Sonic The Hedgehog: Sonic Prime, Vol. 2 (October 21, 2025): Contains adaptations of Sonic Prime season 1 episodes 3-5
- Sonic The Hedgehog: Sonic Prime, Vol. 3 (April 7, 2026): Contains adaptations of Sonic Prime season 1 episodes 6-8
- Sonic The Hedgehog: Sonic Prime, Vol. 4 (September 8, 2026): Contains adaptations of Sonic Prime season 2 episodes 1-4

=== Cancelled ===
- Sonic the Hedgehog: Tangle & Whisper Boxset: Would have contained issues #1–4 in a collectible slipcase
- Sonic the Hedgehog: Chasing Shadows: One-shot comic book featuring Shadow the Hedgehog. After multiple postponements of the release date, its author, Kiel Phegley, announced that it had been cancelled.

== Reception ==
Joshua Davison on Bleeding Cool gave the first issue a score of 6.5/10, praising the art and creativity of the story but criticizing Sonic's characterization: "Sonic is an insufferable character... He's smug, annoying, and radical in that 1990's sense."

Dustin Holland's review of the first issue of the Imposter Syndrome miniseries on Comic Book Resources praised the personalities of new villains Surge and Kit, action-filled plot, and appropriately expressive art.

== In other media ==
Characters from the series have appeared in Sonic mobile games such as Sonic Forces: Speed Battle and Sonic Rumble Party. Merchandise of Tangle and Whisper, including plush toys, has also been released. Tangle was also briefly mentioned in the 2022 Sonic game Sonic Frontiers.

On February 26, 2026, Tangle and Whisper were added as free post-launch characters in the video game Sonic Racing: CrossWorlds. Tangle and Whisper are featured in the 2026 podcast Sonic the Hedgehog Presents: The Chaotix Casefiles, voiced by Ashlyn Madden and Anairis Quiñones respectively. TailsTube #14 features Tangle and Whisper, with other characters from the comic series being mentioned.

Characters who were introduced in the IDW Publishing comics appear in DC x Sonic the Hedgehog: Metal Legion. In Issue #1, Rough, Tumble, and Clutch are shown teaming up with crime boss Bruno Mannheim and Intergang. In Issue #3, Tangle is shown having befriended and partnered with Batgirl.
