= Sonic the Hedgehog (Archie Comics) =

Comic book series

- Cover of Sonic the Hedgehog issue #0 (November 22, 1992); Art by Scott Shaw

Publication information
- Publisher: Archie Comics; Sega of America
- Schedule: Monthly
- Genre: Action comedy; Superhero
- Publication date: November 22, 1992 – December 28, 2016
- No. of issues: 294 (Note: A four-issue limited series (#0–3) and a 290-issue ongoing series (#1–290); not counting spin-offs)
- Main character: Sonic the Hedgehog

Creative team
- Written by: Ian Flynn, Ken Penders et al.
- Penciller(s): Tracy Yardley, Steven Butler et al.
- Editor(s): Mike Pellerito, Justin Gabrie et al.

Sonic the Hedgehog was an American comic book published by Archie Comics, based on Sega's Sonic the Hedgehog video game franchise. It began in November 1992 as a four-issue limited series, before running as an ongoing series for 290 issues until December 2016. Writers included Michael Gallagher, Ken Penders, Karl Bollers, and Ian Flynn; artists included Scott Shaw, Patrick Spaziante, Steven Butler, and Tracy Yardley. Sonic the Hedgehog adapted elements of the Sonic games, but featured a distinct continuity with an original cast, setting, and backstory. It drew its premise from the DIC animated series Sonic the Hedgehog (1993–1994; known colloquially as Sonic SatAM), (Note: "SatAM" is an abbreviation of "Saturday AM", as in Saturday-morning cartoon. To avoid confusion with other Sonic works, the television program is referred to as Sonic SatAM throughout the article.) with Sonic as a member of the Freedom Fighters, a resistance force battling the evil Doctor Eggman.

Following the success of the Sega Genesis game Sonic the Hedgehog (1991), Sega began expanding Sonic to other media. Archie obtained the license to publish Sonic comics in mid-1992 and recruited Gallagher and Shaw, who developed Sonic the Hedgehog as an action comedy that incorporated elements from SatAM and another DIC series, Adventures of Sonic the Hedgehog. Penders became the head writer in 1994 and took it in a more dramatic, superhero comic-like direction, developing an elaborate backstory and cast. Flynn replaced him in 2006 and worked to incorporate more elements from the games. Archie published spin-offs including Knuckles the Echidna (1997–1999), Sonic Universe (2009–2017), and comics based on the animated series Sonic X (2005–2009) and Sonic Boom (2014–2015). In 2013, following a lawsuit over ownership of Penders' characters, Archie removed most of the cast, leaving only those from the games and SatAM.

Sonic the Hedgehog was a sales success. By 2016, it was the longest-running American comic book to have never been renumbered. It remains the longest-running comic based on a video game, and the longest-running comic based on a licensed property. In December 2016, following the publication of issue #290, Sega revoked the license, and in July 2017, announced it was ending its business relationship with Archie in favor of IDW Publishing. The Archie series' creative team, including Flynn, returned to work on IDW's Sonic comic, which began in April 2018. In the 2020s, Penders began publishing unofficial reprints and a graphic novel series featuring his characters.

== Content ==
Sonic the Hedgehog was an American comic book published by Archie Comics as part of its action line. Aimed at a preteen audience, it featured stories starring Sonic the Hedgehog and other Sonic characters. It featured original stories alongside adaptations of Sonic games, such as Sonic CD (1993), Sonic the Fighters (1996), Sonic Adventure (1998), and Sonic Unleashed (2008). The comic occasionally adapted other Sega properties, such as Golden Axe, Ecco the Dolphin, Panzer Dragoon, and Nights into Dreams. Archie published spin-offs including the original ongoing series Knuckles the Echidna (1997–1999) and Sonic Universe (2009–2017), and adaptations of the animated series Sonic X (2005–2009) and Sonic Boom (2014–2015).

The creative direction varied. New York described Sonic the Hedgehog as "a hodgepodge of ideas from many different writers", and Kotaku said it had abrupt tonal shifts between puns, slapstick comedy, and "existential angst". It began as an upbeat action comedy, similar to other Archie comics, before shifting to a more superhero comic-like direction with longer story arcs and science fiction, high fantasy, and soap opera elements. Some stories parody superheroes, the film Casablanca (1942), and the manga Sailor Moon (1991–1997), while others deal with more mature subjects, such as drug use and fascism. Some include crossovers with other comics, including Image Comics' Spawn and Savage Dragon (1992–present), Archie's Sabrina the Teenage Witch (1997–1999), and Archie and Capcom's Mega Man (2011–2015).

The Freedom Fighters, who originated from the animated series Sonic SatAM (1993–1994), were Sonic the Hedgehog's protagonists. The comic continued to feature the Freedom Fighters long after Sega retired them in other media.

As it began before the games had significant storytelling, Sonic the Hedgehog drew its premise from DIC Entertainment's animated series Sonic SatAM (1993–1994). Set on the planet Mobius, it features the Freedom Fighters, a resistance group of which Sonic is a member, battling the evil Doctor Eggman. Eggman, a mad scientist, has conquered large swaths of territory and seeks to build an empire and turn Mobius' animals into subservient robots. Early issues resembled DIC's other Sonic cartoon, the slapstick Adventures of Sonic the Hedgehog (1993). Later issues incorporated SatAM's darker tone and a greater focus on worldbuilding. Sonic the Hedgehog continued to use elements from SatAM, such as Mobius and the character Sally Acorn, long after Sega retired them in other media. It developed an elaborate and unique continuity that expanded as the comic incorporated elements from new Sonic games and TV shows, such as the Sonic original video animation (1996) and Sonic Underground (1999). Some game adaptations were released as tie-ins, while other stories retroactively incorporated game elements into the comic.

Alongside the SatAM characters and game characters such as Miles "Tails" Prower, Amy Rose, Knuckles the Echidna, the Chaotix, and Shadow the Hedgehog, the comic featured hundreds of original characters, such as Sonic's villainous doppelgänger Scourge and Knuckles' girlfriend Julie-Su. Mobius is implied to be a post-apocalyptic Earth of the far future, the characters having emerged after aliens detonated a biological weapon. Humans, known as "overlanders", have moved underground. In contrast to the comical Eggman of the games, the comic Eggman is a menacing, "techno-fascist dictator" who has overthrown Mobius' reigning monarchy. Journalists have characterized the continuity as complicated, unusual for a children's comic. For example, Eggman is killed and Mobius liberated at the conclusion of the "Endgame" storyline in issue #50 (1997). So that Eggman could continue appearing, the creative team introduced a robot incarnation from an alternate universe; he transfers his consciousness to another body to take on Eggman's appearance in games from Sonic Adventure onward.

Destructoid and Kotaku said that the complex continuity created problems when Sonic the Hedgehog had to adapt the games, requiring "convoluted plot twists" to reconcile the game and comic continuities. For instance, Sonic Adventure features a setting and character designs that contradicted the comic at release, so the team had to quickly introduce rectifying plot devices to adapt it. Knuckles' backstory in particular differs drastically from the games, with Kotaku writing that the comic's addition of his large extended family proved "almost impossible" to reconcile during game tie-ins. Sonic the Hedgehog began to move closer to the games in the 2000s, incorporating elements such as the seven Chaos Emeralds and Chao, before a 2013 reboot removed almost all original characters, leaving only those from the games and SatAM. The Mobius setting was dropped, and the Freedom Fighters were redesigned to bring them more in line with the games. At the time of its cancellation, the comic was adapting the storyline of the Sonic games; the final issue was a retelling of Sonic CD.

== History ==
=== 1992–1994: Conception and early stories ===
Following the success of Sonic the Hedgehog (1991) for the Sega Genesis, Sega began working to expand Sonic to other media. Archie acquired the license to publish Sonic comics in mid-1992. According to the writer and artist Ken Penders, David Silberkleit, son of the Archie publisher Michael Silberkleit, was friends with the Sega of America employee tasked with licensing Sonic and introduced Archie to the franchise. Penders wrote that after Sega sent Archie several Genesis consoles with Sonic, the editor Daryl Edelman was assigned to develop a Sonic limited series and rejected an initial pitch from the writer Paul Castiglia.

On July 23, 1992, Edelman called the writer Michael Gallagher, with whom he had been working on Betty and Veronica (1987–2015). Edelman thought Gallagher was suited to write Sonic due to his experience writing ALF (1988–1992) for Marvel Comics. They discussed Sonic's characters and setting, and Gallagher, a freelancer, accepted the job; he said the decision was easy, particularly after he learned Scott Shaw would be penciling. Gallagher was given a week to submit his first script and tasked to use the Sonic visuals to "establish the characters quickly [with] strong exposition". He began work after receiving DIC Entertainment's Sonic style guide.

Gallagher wrote his scripts by sketching rough layouts for Shaw to build on. Edelman supported this approach because, as a licensed comic, each script had to be reviewed by Sega and DIC in addition to Archie. The first issue, Sonic the Hedgehog #0, was published on November 22, 1992. It was initially published as a four-issue limited series, becoming an ongoing series as soon as the initial run concluded in 1993. The early issues, which contained three standalone stories, were light and comedic, relying on puns and inside jokes. Shaw departed after three issues, so Edelman recruited one of Gallagher's friends, Dave Manak, to replace him. Gallagher said he and Manak had "developed a symbiotic working relationship" at Marvel, which he felt made them a good team for Sonic. The Archie editor Victor Gorelick guided Edelman and his successors, Scott Fulop and Justin Gabrie.

=== 1994–2006: Ken Penders and spin-offs ===
Shortly after Sonic became an ongoing series, Gallagher departed as the head writer. Archie recruited Penders to replace him. According to Penders, Castiglia had approached Penders' writing partner Mike Kanterovich about writing Sonic; Kanterovich was not familiar with Sonic, so he offered the job to Penders. Penders' son was a Sonic fan, and they would frequently read Gallagher's stories together at bedtime. Penders began submitting his scripts in October 1993, and his first issue, Sonic the Hedgehog #11, was published in 1994. He originally continued Gallagher's approach, but, after getting Fulop's permission, began writing more adventure-focused stories to bring the comic in line with Sonic SatAM. Penders assumed he would only work on Sonic temporarily, but it quickly became a long-term commitment.

Penders took Sonic in a more dramatic, superhero comic-like direction, with a large cast and complex continuity. When SatAM was canceled, the creative team expected that the comic would follow. Penders said that Fulop, based on his experience with previous licensed comics, expected Sonic to last six to eight months after SatAM. Penders wrote the "Endgame" storyline, which concluded in issue #50 in 1997, as a series finale, but Sega wanted the comic to continue. Penders said that SatAM's cancellation and the games' irregular release schedule made the comic the primary Sonic media, and sales increased.

Sega did not pay much attention to the comic, which it saw as little more than an advertisement for the games. This granted Penders and other Archie staff considerable artistic license. Penders said Sega only instructed him that Sonic "had to be cool... he had to be fast, [and] he had to have attitude". Sega never rejected any of Penders' original characters, but rejected a pitch involving Sonic battling parodies of Nintendo's Mario and Luigi. Sega's lack of communication sometimes created production problems. When Sega asked the creative team to adapt Sonic Adventure, it did not supply details, requiring Archie to import a Dreamcast and a Japanese Adventure copy to begin work. During Penders' tenure as writer, Sega incorporated elements from the comic in other media; Athair, a character introduced in Gallagher's run, appears in an episode of Sonic Underground, and the game compilation Sonic Mega Collection (2002) includes select issues and every cover up to issue #115 as bonuses.

In 1997, Penders moved to write the spin-off series Knuckles the Echidna, where he had unrestricted creative freedom. According to Penders, Sega did not know what to do with Knuckles, so he was free to develop a backstory without other writers. He wrote Knuckles' demeanor as rooted in him "coming from a broken home" so readers could relate, and introduced his expansive extended family. Karl Bollers succeeded Penders as Sonic's head writer and wrote an 80-issue run in which he introduced the notion that Mobius was a post-apocalyptic Earth. Other writers included Gallagher, who wrote backup stories and spin-offs; Dan Slott, who wrote a Sailor Moon parody and introduced an alternate-universe incarnation of Sonic; and Fulop, who wrote under the pseudonym Kent Taylor until 1998. The artists included Penders, Steven Butler, Patrick Spaziante, and Jim Valentino.

After Archie canceled Knuckles the Echidna in 1999, Penders moved back to the main Sonic series. Issue #125, published in 2003, included a letter from Sonic's co-creator Yuji Naka. By 2005, Penders was the head writer again. That year, Sonic reached its 150th issue, and Archie began publishing a spin-off based on the Sonic X animated series, written by Joe Edkin and penciled by Tim Smith. Penders departed in 2006, recalling in 2025 that he was dissatisfied with his pay and wanted to work with Sega of America separately on a Sonic film. He also felt a change was necessary as Sega of Japan was beginning to scrutinize the comic. Penders' departure was reportedly acrimonious.

=== 2006–2013: Ian Flynn, lawsuit, and reboot ===
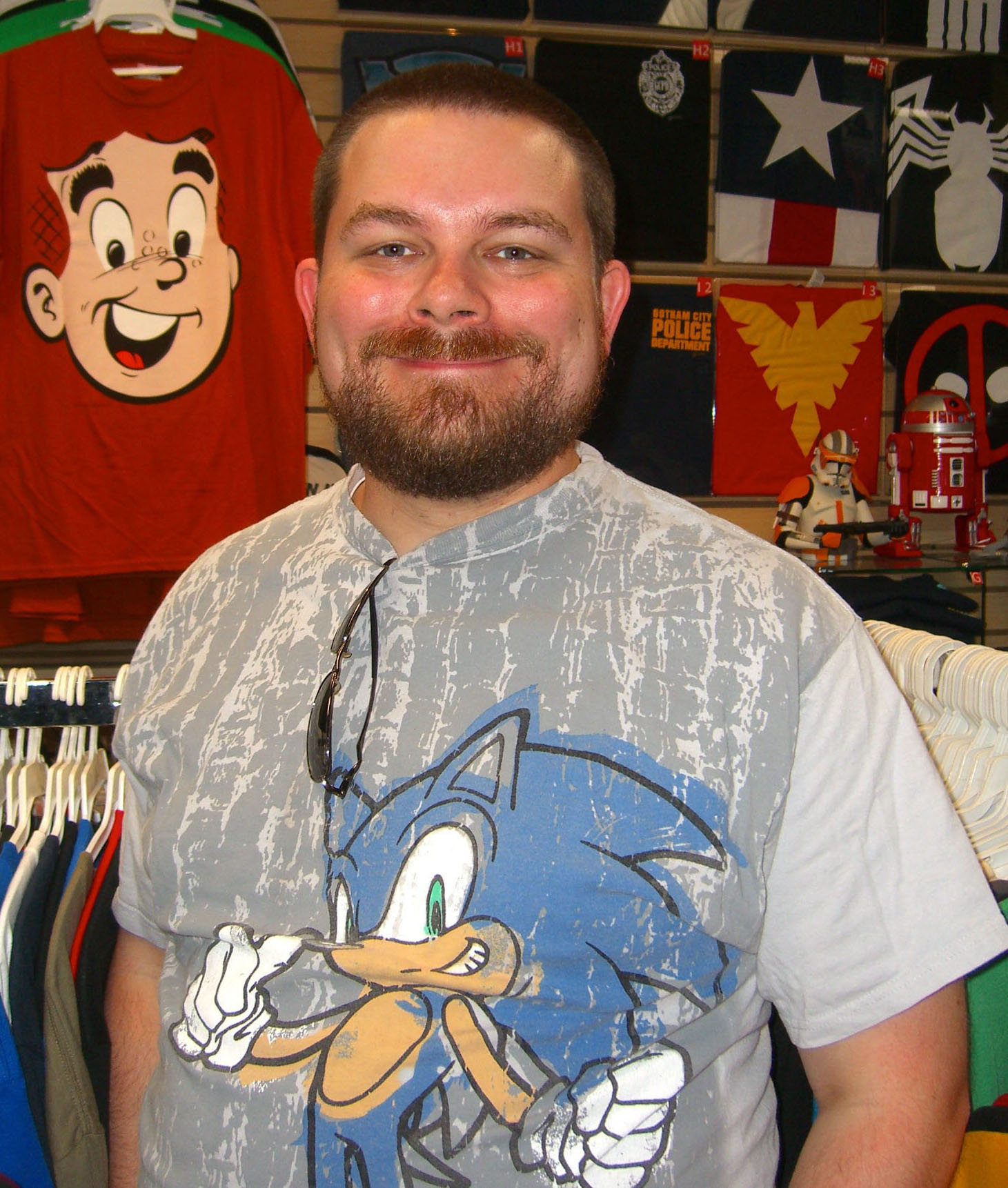
Ian Flynn, Sonic the Hedgehog's head writer from 2006 until its cancellation in 2016

Ian Flynn replaced Penders. He was hired in October 2005, and his first story as head writer was published in Sonic the Hedgehog #160 in March 2006. According to Flynn, he wrote fan comics and spent four years sending cover letters and writing samples before the editor Mike Pellerito hired him. Flynn wanted to bring "all the crazy, experimental stuff" of the previous creative teams more in line with the games and honor "the creative effort that had come before me while making a book that was more recognizable to the casual Sonic fan".

Flynn concluded storylines that Penders left unresolved, had unpopular characters killed off, and worked to incorporate characters, locations, and other elements from the games. Butler and Spaziante continued to contribute art and were joined by others, including Tracy Yardley. In February 2009, Flynn and Yardley launched a second ongoing series, Sonic Universe. It focused on supporting characters, such as Shadow and Metal Sonic, and game characters who had not appeared in the comic. The Sonic Universe story intersected with Sonic the Hedgehog, though it was written so that it could be read independently.

Penders criticized Flynn's direction and did not consider the stories featuring his characters canon. He accused Flynn and Pellerito of "living off the work done by others that came before them instead of allowing Sonic to grow and evolve [organically]". The 2008 Nintendo DS game Sonic Chronicles: The Dark Brotherhood features characters based on those Penders created for the comic. This prompted Penders, who was under the impression that Sega held the rights to his characters, to ask Archie for copies of his contracts. According to Penders, Gorelick responded that the contracts did not exist. In 2009, Penders began copyrighting his Sonic stories and artwork. In 2010, the United States Copyright Office certified his claims, and in 2011, he announced The Lara-Su Chronicles, a graphic novel series featuring his characters. Pellerito said Penders' claims were "completely false" and that Archie would take legal action. While most of Archie's legal team favored a settlement, one lawyer persuaded Archie that responding aggressively would make Penders back down.

Archie sued Penders in the United States District Court for the Southern District of New York (SDNY), alleging his actions constituted tortious interference with Archie and Sega's licensing agreement. Archie supplied a photocopy of a 1996 work-for-hire contract with Penders' signature, and said the original had been destroyed in a fire. Penders responded that he never signed such a contract, that the photocopy was a forgery, and with counterclaims that Archie's use of his characters constituted copyright infringement. Because the contract was a reproduction and dated well after Penders' writing tenure began, its authenticity was dubious. Additionally, Archie was unable to supply original copies of any previous contributor's contract. Shaw and another Archie freelancer, Elliot S. Maggin, corroborated Penders' claim that Archie did not require freelancers to sign work-for-hire contracts, and Fulop and Gabrie said in affidavits that they never sent any. Sega asked to be excluded from the proceedings and refused to assist Archie. A 2025 Berkeley Journal of Entertainment & Sports Law article, co-authored by Penders, suggested that Archie and Sega assumed that they would hold the copyrights due to the comic being a derivative work.

For most of the lawsuit, Flynn continued writing Sonic unaffected. In 2011, Archie transferred ownership of the comic stories and characters to Sega, and announced plans to reprint Sonic the Hedgehog, Knuckles the Echidna, and Sonic Universe as graphic novels. In July 2012, Archie's motion for a summary judgment was denied, and in September, Penders blocked Diamond Comic Distributors from distributing a Knuckles reprint. Unable to fight the case without Sega's help, Archie fired its lawyers, and the replacement legal team entered mediation with Penders. When asked by a judge, on the topic of the contracts, if "prior counsel blew it", the Archie counsel Joshua Paul replied, "unequivocally". In Sonic the Hedgehog #243, Flynn had the Penders characters abruptly banished to another dimension off-page. In 2013, Archie and Penders reached a settlement, and the case was dismissed.

While Archie and Sega were allowed to continue using Penders' characters under the terms of the settlement, they opted to reboot the comic and remove them. Archie began publishing a crossover between Sonic and Mega Man, which shared Sonic's creative team. Flynn called it "miraculously timed", as it provided the pretext for a reboot. The crossover concludes with Sonic using Chaos Control to restore his world, but in doing so, alters the comic's backstory to exclude its original characters.

=== 2013–2017: Final years and cancellation ===
The rebooted continuity began with Sonic the Hedgehog #252, which sees Sonic return to his world and reintroduces the cast. The editor Vincent Lovallo described it as a soft reboot, and characters retain memories from the previous continuity, though most lingering narrative threads were abandoned. Flynn decided to adapt Sonic Unleashed as a starting point, with surviving characters, such as the Freedom Fighters, reworked to bring them closer to the games. In 2014, he and the artist Evan Stanley began working on a spin-off based on the Sonic Boom animated series and its game tie-ins Rise of Lyric and Shattered Crystal. In 2015, Archie published a second crossover with Mega Man that included characters from other Sega and Capcom franchises, such as Panzer Dragoon and Street Fighter. By 2016, Sonic was the longest-running American comic to have never been renumbered. Flynn was preparing for the 300th issue, set for publication in 2017.

In August 2016, Fulop sued Archie and Sega for copyright infringement, arguing he was owed royalties for Archie's use of characters he created. Fulop, who copyrighted his characters and stories around the same time as Penders, said Archie's contracts were not work-for-hire agreements and only concerned first publication rights. On December 28, the day Sonic the Hedgehog #290 was published, Archie received a cease-and-desist order from Sega of Japan to stop publishing Sonic comics until it renewed the licensing agreement with Sega of America. Flynn said that, around this time, he received a call that Sega had revoked the license. Archie quietly withdrew solicitations and canceled subscriptions. Reports emerged that Sega was charging more for the license and, while the comic was profitable, Archie was unwilling to fight for it, as Archie's CEO, Jon Goldwater, desired to move away from a property Archie did not own. Journalists and fans have speculated that the lawsuits also played a role, with Bleeding Cool writing that they likely damaged Archie and Sega's relationship.

Archie did not announce the cancellation, leading to confusion surrounding the comic's fate. It ended in the middle of a story arc, and issues up to #294 had been solicited. Bleeding Cool noted it was unusual for a modern comic to be abruptly canceled shortly before a milestone issue. In May 2017, an Archie spokesperson told Bleeding Cool that Archie and Sega were in negotiations, but in July, Sega announced it was ending its partnership with Archie in favor of IDW Publishing.

=== 2017–present: Post-cancellation ===
IDW's Sonic comic began in April 2018. The creative team from the Archie series returned, but the IDW series had stronger oversight from Sega, with none of the Archie cast, including the Freedom Fighters, returning. Flynn said the IDW series only drew from the games, rather than combining the ideas of different writers, editors, and animated series as the Archie series had. The Archie series is out of print and unavailable through digital distribution. The Freedom Fighters and other comic characters and stories Sega owns have not appeared in any Sonic media since, though, in 2023, the Sonic games' director Morio Kishimoto expressed interest in reviving them.

In 2019, the SDNY judge Vincent L. Briccetti dismissed Fulop's lawsuit due to the statute of limitations having passed, but noted that Archie provided no evidence that Fulop signed a work-for-hire contract. He held that Archie could not pursue counterclaims for copyright infringement due to having transferred its ownership claims to Sega, nor could it for slander as it did not provide evidence Fulop acted with malice. In 2020, Fulop trademarked his character Mammoth Mogul, and in 2021, sold merchandise featuring Mammoth Mogul and other characters he created for Sonic. Fulop remains the only Sonic writer besides Penders to have taken legal action against Archie and Sega. Shaw considered filing a lawsuit for the reproduction of his work in Sonic Mega Collection, but decided against it due to a negative experience in civil court during a divorce. Following a protracted development, Penders began publishing The Lara-Su Chronicles in 2024. The first release, Beginnings, comprised new material alongside reprints of his Sonic comics. He also published unofficial reprints of Knuckles the Echidna and Shaw's Sonic comics.

== Reception and legacy ==
Sonic the Hedgehog was a major success for Archie. According to Penders, by April 1994, it was the third-bestselling American comic, outselling every DC and Marvel publication except for X-Men (1991–2014) and X-Men 2099 (1993–1996). By 2013, it sold 9,000–12,000 issues per month, twice as much as Archie's flagship comic, Archie (1942–2020). The journalist Chris Sims, writing for ComicsAlliance, wrote that it was popular despite its relatively low profile; he said when working in the direct market, "it was the only kids' book that we'd get specific requests for with any regularity". Sonic's longevity surprised CGMagazine and Kotaku. CGMagazine described the comic "enduring generational shifts and the dwindling success of its source material" as remarkable. Sims, in Polygon, attributed the longevity to Archie resisting the American comic industry trend of canceling and rebooting series to boost sales, as well as keeping old stories in print through the digest format.

Destructoid appreciated the comic for expanding the characters and setting at a time when the Sonic games had limited storytelling. They said it "perfect[ly] compliment[ed]" the games, exploring character backstories and relationships, and particularly enjoyed its depiction of Eggman's villainy. Likewise, CGMagazine said it enriched the Sonic world, and TheGamer praised it as one of the best depictions of Sonic and "the most expansive exploration of [him] outside of gaming". Kotaku remembered the comic for its weirdness, and said the tonal inconsistencies and "buck-wild" nature made it interesting and fun. They said that the comic, despite its flaws, was often the best thing about the Sonic franchise. As the games' critical standing declined in the 2000s, Kotaku said "it felt like the comics' creative team was the only one who knew how to have fun with [Sonic]".

Journalists considered the complicated continuity a drawback, with AiPT! writing that Sonic "was for years a behemoth of intimidating continuity and ponderous lore". Sims described learning about Sonic as "an exercise in trying to figure out if the people you're talking to are just messing with you", and said the continuity made it "weirdly difficult" for a new reader. Conversely, CGMagazine praised the creative team's ability to implement elements from the game stories in the comic continuity while maintaining their spirit. It described the comic as "the most consistent version of Sonic's lore" and admired how consistent the world felt despite hundreds of issues, reboots, and rotating creative teams.

Some critics praised Penders' stories as complex and mature, while others criticized them as unfocused and self-aggrandizing. The broader Sonic fandom was bewildered by their differences from the games. Many fans considered Flynn's run an improvement for streamlining the continuity and developing characters, though Sims said the comic felt directionless after the reboot. New York noted tension between Flynn's fans, who blamed Penders for Sonic's cancellation, and Penders' fans, who accused Flynn of ruining the comic with "social justice warrior" politics. Archie's lawsuit made Penders a controversial figure in the Sonic fandom. The Berkeley Journal of Entertainment & Sports Law and Penders wrote its outcome was important for creator ownership in comics, illustrating the deficiencies of American copyright law compared to other countries with large comic industries, such as Japan and France.

Sonic remains the longest-running comic based on a video game, and the longest-running comic based on a licensed property. It remains popular among Sonic fans; New York wrote that many were lifelong readers and considered the comic a franchise staple. After the cancellation, fans created Archie Sonic Online, an unofficial webcomic that continues the pre-reboot storyline. They also worked to finish solicited but unpublished issues. In addition to writing the IDW series, Flynn began writing the Sonic games with Sonic Frontiers (2022). The artist Tyson Hesse worked on the comic before contributing to other Sonic media, including the IDW series, the game Sonic Mania (2017), and the Sonic the Hedgehog films (2020 onwards). After writing for Sonic, Bollers became an editor at Valiant Comics, and Slott became known for writing Spider-Man comics.
