= Mike Pollock (voice actor) =

American voice actor (born 1965)

- Pollock at Animate! Philadelphia in 2026
- Born: Michael B. Pollock; March 9, 1965 (age 61); Roslyn Heights, New York, U.S.
- Other name: Herb Lawrence
- Occupation: Voice actor
- Years active: 1983–present
- Relatives: Bill Pollock (brother)
- A voice sample of Mike Pollock
- Website: itsamike.com

Michael B. Pollock (born March 9, 1965) is an American voice actor, best known for being the voice of Doctor Eggman and Gerald Robotnik (among other characters) in the Sonic the Hedgehog franchise since 2003. He has voiced numerous characters in various anime English dubs, video games, and other animated work.

His other notable roles include the narrator, Raoul Contesta and Drayden in the Pokémon series, Adon Coborlwitz from Berserk, Meat from Ultimate Muscle, Langston Lickatoad from Viva Piñata, Suikyou from the Ikki Tousen series, Beast in the motion comic adaptation of Astonishing X-Men and multiple characters in Kirby: Right Back at Ya!.

== Early life ==
Michael B. Pollock was born on March 9, 1965, the son of Herb Lawrence Pollock. He graduated from Roslyn High School in 1983, where he was involved with their theater program, called the Royal Crown Players. He worked in radio in Upstate New York in the 1980s.

== Career ==
When he returned to New York City in the 1990s, he was booked into some children's videos, anime and an episode of Pokémon. Pollock recalls it was director Eric Stuart who brought him in as a guest spot for Pokémon and he then got recommended for roles in Kirby: Right Back at Ya!, Ultimate Muscle and the FoxBox promotion announcer. His first major anime role was Meat in Ultimate Muscle.

Pollock first took the role of Doctor Eggman in the English dub of Sonic X, in which he also portrayed Professor Gerald Robotnik. Pollock assumed the role of Eggman in the video game series beginning with the 2005 games Shadow the Hedgehog and Sonic Rush, as part of an initiative by SEGA to maintain vocal consistency between the concurrent video game/TV portrayals of the Sonic the Hedgehog franchise.

Several anime websites, anime conventions, podcasters and interviewers have commented on Pollock's performance as Dr. Eggman in numerous video games and animated series within the Sonic franchise. His performance as Dr. Eggman has become identified with the character.

On July 15, 2010, Sega announced that the Sonic the Hedgehog franchise would undergo a re-casting, with a new set of voice actors based in Los Angeles, California, assuming the roles of each character. Despite this, Pollock continued to voice Dr. Eggman. According to Pollock himself, none of the actors who auditioned fit the role well. Pollock also reprised his role of Dr. Eggman on the TV series Sonic Boom, which premiered on November 8, 2014. Overall, Pollock has held the Eggman role for longer than any other English-speaking actor.

For Teleflora's Mother's Day campaign in 2016, Pollock narrated Vince Lombardi's "What It Takes to Be Number One" speech in a commercial video called "One Tough Mother".

From 2020 to 2021, he reprised his role as Dr. Eggman in the unofficial YouTube audio drama series, Sonic and Tails R.

== Personal life ==
Pollock is Jewish and has described himself as "secular but religious aware". He is sometimes credited with his father's name in tribute. His brother, Bill Pollock, is the director of a publishing house No Starch Press.

== Filmography ==
=== Anime ===
List of dubbing performances in anime
Year	Title	Role	Notes	Refs
2000	Demon Fighter Kocho	Professor		
2001	Twin Signal	The Professor		
2001	Magic User's Club	Mitsuru Minowa		
2002	Berserk	Adon Coborlwitz		
2002	Yu-Gi-Oh! Duel Monsters	Arthur Hawkins, Gurimo		
2002–06	Kirby: Right Back at Ya!	Mayor Len Blustergas, Samo, Chef Shiitake, Kit Cosmos	4Kids dub	
2002–04	Ultimate Muscle	Meat		
2003–06	Sonic X	Doctor Eggman, Ella, Professor Gerald Robotnik	4Kids dub	
2003–20	Pokémon	Narrator (2004–06), Drayden, Raoul Contesta, others		
2004	Gokusen	Kouzou Wakamatsu		
2004	Giant Robo: The Animation	Issei, Professor Shizuma		
2005	Shingu: Secret of the Stellar Wars	Cabinet Secretary, Velosh		
2005	Ah! My Goddess	Urn of Hakushon the Demon King		
2005–08	Yu-Gi-Oh! GX	Jean Louis Bonaparte		
2006	Animation Runner Kuromi	Yu Tokahara, The Boss		
2007	Ah! My Goddess: Flights of Fancy	Priest	As Herb Lawrence	
2009	Ikki Tousen: Dragon Destiny	Suikyou		
2011	Bakuman	Fumio		
2013	Queen's Blade Rebellion	Dogura, Elder		
2013	Ikki Tousen: Great Guardians	Suikyou		
2014	Ikki Tousen: Xtreme Xecutor	Suikyou		
2015	Holy Knight	Lilith's Father		
2016	Rio: Rainbow Gate	Tom Howard	Also Reshuffle	
2017	World War Blue	Marcus, Guligi		
2018	That Time I Got Reincarnated as a Slime	Orc General		
2018	Legend of the Galactic Heroes: Die Neue These	Hans von Seeckt		
2019	Dr. Stone	Yakov Nikitin		
2020	Great Pretender	Kudo	Netflix dub	
2020	Akudama Drive	Police Chief	Funimation dub	
2021	Dragon Goes House-Hunting	Narrator	Funimation dub	
2021	One Piece	Donquixote Homing	Funimation dub	
2021	The Vampire Dies in No Time	Draus	Funimation dub	
2023	My Happy Marriage	Yoshiro Usuba/Yoshiro Tsuruki	Netflix dub	
2023	Pluto	Professor Ochanomizu	Netflix dub	

=== Animation ===
List of voice performances in animation
Year	Title	Role	Notes	Refs
2003–06	Teenage Mutant Ninja Turtles	Garbageman, Kirby		
2006	Padre Pio	Minister General		
2006–09	Viva Piñata	Langston Lickatoad, Announcer		
2008–09	GoGoRiki	Bigoriki		
2009–12	Huntik: Secrets & Seekers	The Professor		
2013–16	Alisa Knows What to Do!	Various characters		
2014–17	Sonic Boom	Dr. Eggman, Fastidious Beaver, Mayor Fink, Bolts, Mirror Dimension Dr. Eggman, Lord Eggman		
2017–19	Running Man animated series	Dr. Mala, Vivache the Wind Spirit		
2018–21	44 Cats	Cop, Cats in Black agent		
2020–present	I, Elvis Riboldi	Prof. Pinkerton		

=== Film ===
List of voice performances in feature films
Year	Title	Role	Notes	Refs
2004	Yu-Gi-Oh! The Movie: Pyramid of Light	Newscaster		
2012	Berserk: The Golden Age Arc - The Battle for Doldrey	Adon		
2016	Miss Hokusai	Manjido	Film festival release of English dub	
2017	Pokémon the Movie: I Choose You!	Bonji		
2018	Lu over the Wall	Nodoguro		
2018	Liz and the Blue Bird	Mr. Hashimoto	Limited theatrical release	
2018	Mazinger Z: Infinity	Dr. Hell	Limited theatrical release	
2019	Promare	Deus Prometh	Limited theatrical release	
2020	Ne Zha	Taiyi Zhenren	Limited theatrical release	
2020	Weathering with You	Yasui, Additional voices	Limited theatrical release	
2023	Deemo: Memorial Keys	Nutcracker, Professor Valensky	Limited theatrical release	
2023	The First Slam Dunk	Mitsuyoshi Anzai	Limited theatrical release	

List of voice performances in direct-to-video and television films
Year	Title	Role	Notes	Refs
1999	Little Tug's Big Adventure	Tug, various characters		
2003	Jungle Emperor Leo	Dr. Moustache		
2004	Pokémon: Jirachi—Wish Maker	Narrator		
2005	Pokémon: Destiny Deoxys	Narrator		
2006	Pokémon: Lucario and the Mystery of Mew	Narrator		
2007	The Little Cars 2: Rodopolis Adventure	Mr. V8		
2007	Ratatoing	Greg	Credited as Herb Lawrence	
2007	The Little Cars 3: Fast & Curious	Mr. V8		
2008	Tiny Robots	The Construction		
2008	The Little Panda Fighter	Master Xin		
2009	Little & Big Monsters	Dr. Crumb		
2009	What's Up: Balloon to the Rescue!	Dr. Crumb		
2010	A Cat in Paris	Mister Baby, Zookeeper		
2013	Berserk: The Golden Age Arc II - The Battle for Doldrey	Adon Coborlwitz		
2014	Welcome to the Space Show	Neppo, Moose Alien		
2016	Kikoriki: Legend of the Golden Dragon			

=== Video games ===
List of voice performances in video games
Year	Title	Role	Notes	Refs
2005	Shadow the Hedgehog	Dr. Eggman, Professor Gerald Robotnik	Grouped under English Character Voices	
2005	Sonic Rush	Dr. Eggman, Dr. Eggman Nega		
2006	Sonic Riders	Dr. Eggman	Grouped under English Character Voices	
2006	Sonic the Hedgehog	Dr. Eggman	Grouped under English Character Voices	
2007	Sonic X	Dr. Eggman		
2007	Sonic and the Secret Rings	King Shahryar	Grouped under English Voice Actors	
2007	Sonic Rush Adventure	Dr. Eggman, Dr. Eggman Nega		
2007	Mario & Sonic at the Olympic Games	Dr. Eggman	Grouped under Character Voices	
2008	Sonic Riders: Zero Gravity	Dr. Eggman	Grouped under Character Voices	
2008	Sonic Unleashed	Dr. Eggman	Grouped under Cast	
2009	Mario & Sonic at the Olympic Winter Games	Dr. Eggman, Dr. Eggman Nega	Grouped under Sega Characters (English)	
2010	Sonic Free Riders	Dr. Eggman	Grouped under English Character Voices	
2010	Sonic Colors	Dr. Eggman		
2011	Sonic Generations	Dr. Eggman, Classic Eggman	Grouped under English Character Voices	
2011	Mario & Sonic at the London 2012 Olympic Games	Dr. Eggman, Dr. Eggman Nega	Grouped under Sega Characters (English)	
2013	Sonic Lost World	Dr. Eggman	Grouped under English Character Voices	
2013	Mario & Sonic at the Sochi 2014 Olympic Winter Games	Dr. Eggman, Dr. Eggman Nega	Grouped under Sega Characters (English)	
2014	Sonic Boom: Rise of Lyric	Dr. Eggman, Mayor Fink, Fastidious Beaver	Grouped under English Character Voices	
2015	Just Cause 3		Grouped under Voice and Motion Capture Actors	
2016	Mario & Sonic at the Rio 2016 Olympic Games	Dr. Eggman, Dr. Eggman Nega	Grouped under Sega Characters (English)	
2016	Lego Dimensions	Dr. Eggman		
2016	Sonic Boom: Fire & Ice	Dr. Eggman	Grouped under English Character Voices	
2017	Sonic Forces	Dr. Eggman	Grouped under English Character Voices	
2017	Syberia 3	Captain Obo, Nic Cantin, Valsembor Police Officer, Customs Officer, Dr. Helmut Mangöling		
2017	Smite	Kuzenbo	Grouped under English Character Voices	
2018	Unavowed	Stanley Bates		
2019	Team Sonic Racing	Dr. Eggman	Grouped under English Character Voices	
2019	Mario & Sonic at the Olympic Games Tokyo 2020	Dr. Eggman, Dr. Eggman Nega	Grouped under English Character Voices	
2021	Terrain of Magical Expertise	President Execk		
2021	Sonic Colors: Ultimate	Dr. Eggman	Grouped under English Character Voices	
2022	Sonic Frontiers	Dr. Eggman, The End (male voice)	Grouped under English Character Voices	
2023	Sonic Dream Team	Dr. Eggman		
2024	Sonic X Shadow Generations	Dr. Eggman, Classic Eggman, Professor Gerald Robotnik	Grouped under English Character Voices	
2025	Sonic Racing: CrossWorlds	Dr. Eggman	Grouped under English Character Voices	
2026	Yu Gi Oh Duel Links	Gurimo		
2026	Fortnite Battle Royale	Dr. Eggman		

=== Radio ===
List of voice performances in radio
Year	Title	Role	Notes	Refs
2006–14	Master Tape Theatre	Sir Hardin Thicke		

=== Audio drama ===
List of voice and dubbing performances in audio dramas
Year	Title	Role	Notes	Source
2026	Sonic the Hedgehog Presents: The Chaotix Casefiles	Dr. Eggman, additional voices		

=== Web ===
List of voice performances in web series
Year	Title	Role	Notes	Refs
2015–present	Sonic Twitter Takeover	Dr. Eggman, The End (male voice)	7 "takeovers" Audio character blog series on Twitter/X and later TikTok	
2020–21	Sonic and Tails R	Dr. Eggman	10 episodes YouTube fan audio drama series	
2021	Golden Sun Dub	Hammet	YouTube game reproduction	
2022–present	TailsTube	Dr. Eggman	3 episodes	
2024	And Beyond	Dr. Rabbitnik the Easter Egg Man	YouTube animation cameo	

=== Other roles ===
List of voice performances in other roles
Year	Title	Role	Notes	Refs
2009	Astonishing X-Men	Beast	motion comics	

== Awards and nominations ==
Year	Award	Category	Title	Result
2014	BTVA Voice Acting Award	Best Male Vocal Performance in a Video Game	Sonic Lost World	Nominated
2014	BTVA Anime Dub Award	Best Vocal Ensemble in an Anime Movie/Special (shared with entire cast)	Berserk: The Golden Age Arc II – The Battle for Doldrey	Nominated
2014	BTVA Anime Dub Award	Best Male Supporting Vocal Performance in an Anime Movie/Special	Berserk: The Golden Age Arc II – The Battle for Doldrey	Nominated
2016	8th Annual Shorty Awards	Best Overall Twitter Presence	"Dr. Eggman Twitter Takeover"	Finalist
