= Adrenalin Misfits =

2010 video game

- European cover art
- Developer: Konami
- Publisher: Konami
- Platform: Xbox 360
- Release: NA: November 4, 2010; EU: November 10, 2010; AU: November 18, 2010; JP: November 20, 2010
- Genres: Sports, racing
- Modes: Single-player, multiplayer

Adrenalin Misfits, known as Crossboard 7 in Europe and Japan, is a sports-racing video game both developed and published by Konami. The game was released on November 4, 2010, in North America, and on November 10, 2010, in Europe for the Xbox 360. The game uses the Kinect motion sensor.

== Gameplay ==
The game involves players utilizing motion controls to navigate downhill courses by leaning, jumping, and performing tricks. The main objective is to race against opponents or the clock to reach the finish line.

Players unlock new courses, characters, and boards as they progress through the game, each with unique attributes and abilities. Tricks such as grabs and flips can be performed to earn points and increase speed.

== Reception ==
Reception

Aggregate score
Aggregator	Score
Metacritic	50/100

Review scores
Publication	Score
4Players	50%
Eurogamer	3/10
Gamekult	5/10
GameSpot	5/10
GamesRadar+	2/5
GameTrailers	5.2/10
GameZone	4.5/10
IGN	5/10
VideoGamer.com	5/10
Metro	3/10
Vandal	6/10

Adrenalin Misfits received "mixed or average" reviews according to review aggregator Metacritic.

Jan Wöbbeking for 4Players rated the game 50%, stating that "The game is still good for a fun balloon hunt or a quick downhill run every now and then, especially if you are no longer dependent on the weak beginner boards. However, Crossboard 7 is not suitable as a serious alternative to Shaun White or Mario Kart Wii."

Ellie Gibson for Eurogamer rated the game 3/10, stating that "Another boarding game! And yes, it's just like Sonic Free Riders! Except Sonic and the stupid albatross have been replaced by a weird green wolf thing and an annoying surfer dude monkey."

Gamekult rated the game 5/10, stating that "With Crossboard 7, Konami offers Kinect a first fun sliding game, but without influence." Mark Walton for GameSpot rated the game 5/10, stating that "Unless you're desperate for a Kinect boarding experience and have some friends to play with, Crossboard 7 is best left to shred the slopes alone."

Taylor Cocke for GamesRadar+ rated the game two out of five stars, stating that "If you were hoping for a Kinect-friendly great snowboarding game, this isn't the one. It controls terribly and is just plain uninteresting. Don't bother unless you're desperate for some XTREEM action. And we mean XTREEM in the worst possible manner."

Jack DeVries for IGN rated the game 5/10, stating that "Adrenalin Misfits isn't broken, it's not hard, it's not hideous. It's just kind of boring and uninspired. Konami played it safe with this one, and ended up with a title that feels like an extended tech demo more than a full-fledged game."

GameTrailers in their video review, rated the game 5.2/10, stating that "Ultimately, you'll find little value in Adrenalin Misfits." GameZone rated the game 4.5/10, stating that "Even if you’re a fan of snowboarding games, you’ll struggle with almost everything that Adrenalin Misfits has to offer."

Metro rated the game 3/10, stating that "this is slightly the better of the two games but not by much. Its advantage is simply that it's not as overcomplicated as the Sonic game, but instead a sort of bog standard SSX clone that is relatively attractive and features a fairly varied range of backdrops."

Jorge Cano for Vandal rated the game 6/10, stating that "Crossboard 7 is clearly aimed at a young audience, from its aesthetics to the low difficulty of completing it, and we believe that a child would have a blast moving and jumping while playing with Kinect."
