= The Murder of Sonic the Hedgehog =

2023 video game

- Developer: Sega Social Team
- Publisher: Sega
- Producer: Michal Miexriir Shafrir
- Designer: Greg Batha
- Programmers: Greg Batha; Michal Miexriir Shafrir; Katie Chrzanowski
- Artists: Ellen Alsop; Min Ho Kim
- Writer: Ian Mutchler
- Composers: Troupe Gammage; Joel Corelitz
- Series: Sonic the Hedgehog
- Engine: Unity
- Platforms: macOS; Windows
- Release: March 31, 2023
- Genre: Visual novel
- Mode: Single-player

The Murder of Sonic the Hedgehog is a 2023 visual novel video game developed by the Sega Social Team and published by Sega for macOS and Windows via Steam. The player converses with various Sonic the Hedgehog characters to investigate Sonic's apparent murder on Amy Rose's birthday. The game was released as freeware on March 31, 2023, as an April Fools' Day joke. The game involves interrogating Sonic the Hedgehog characters and searching for clues to solve the mystery of Sonic's murder.

The Murder of Sonic the Hedgehog received generally favorable reviews, with critics praising the art style, humor, and dialogue. Fans also responded positively, with the game becoming the highest-rated Sonic game on Steam and the 61st highest-rated game overall on the platform one week after its release.

== Gameplay ==
Investigation gameplay in the saloon car, showing the player highlighting the arcade machine

The Murder of Sonic the Hedgehog is a visual novel with some elements of point-and-click adventure gameplay. In the game, the player moves sequentially through each car of an express train towards its front. Each time the player enters a new car, they must investigate it by clicking on objects to examine them and locate evidence. Once enough evidence has been gathered, the player will be able to interrogate the other characters in the car and must present the correct evidence to confirm or refute the characters' claims. At predetermined points during an interrogation, the player will enter a "Think" minigame, which is played on the "DreamGear", a reference to Sega's Dreamcast and Game Gear consoles. In these segments, the player controls Sonic in an isometric auto-running platformer. The player must collect a target number of rings while dodging oncoming hazards to advance to the next phase of the interrogation. As the game progresses, these minigames become more difficult as more rings need to be collected and more obstacles are added. The team included an optional "assist mode" in the game that allows players to lower the difficulty of the minigames, to make the game more accessible to a variety of players. Once an interrogation is complete, the player will be able to advance to the next car.

== Plot ==
The player controls a quokka named Barry, (Note: The player character is identified as "Barry" in the game's code and marketing material, though the player can choose the character's name.) who is a new employee aboard an excursion train known as the Mirage Express. To celebrate Amy Rose's birthday, she and her friends Sonic, Tails, Knuckles, Espio, Vector, Rouge, Blaze, and Shadow are holding a murder mystery game aboard the train. Barry is directed by the conductor to assist the participants as needed.

As part of the birthday celebrations, Amy has all the other characters dress and play roles common in murder mystery tropes, including Tails as a detective and herself as a journalist. The participants are informed that any of the characters aside from Tails and Amy can potentially be the killer, and they must deduce the killer's identity. Shortly after the game is meant to begin, the train speeds up suddenly, causing Barry, Amy, and Tails to be thrown back into a storage closet and knocked unconscious.

When they reawaken, Amy, Tails, and Barry return to the dining car and find Sonic lying on the floor. Believing this is part of the game, Amy and Tails begin investigating immediately, while Barry checks on Sonic and discovers him to be unconscious and badly injured. Amy rushes ahead to start her own investigation, leaving Barry to accompany Tails. The two move between the themed cars, interrogating each of the participants to verify their alibis. Progressing through a saloon, a library, a casino, and a lounge, Tails and Barry eventually reach the conductor car at the front of the train, where the rest of the party is called to gather.

When Sonic fails to arrive for the gathering, Amy and Vector go to retrieve him and find him unresponsive. Using evidence they gathered along the way, Tails and Barry determine that Espio was the murderer and knocked Sonic out with a blowdart. Sonic awakens and reveals that the Mirage Express is one of several trains converted into Badniks by Doctor Eggman to take control of various cities' infrastructures. Unbeknownst to Espio, he had been following instructions given by the train. Upset with the conductor for planning to retire, the train plotted to deliver everyone to Eggman's base in exchange for a bounty which it intended to use to force the conductor to stay with it forever.

Everyone is dragged back to their cars and locked inside. With Barry's help, Sonic spindashes through the car doors to free everyone and reach the conductor car. Racing alongside the train, Sonic frees the Flicky powering it and Amy destroys the train. Before it deactivates, the conductor bids the train goodbye, promising to never forget their time together.

The group disembarks at a station, and the conductor reunites with his wife to begin his retirement, now accompanied by the Flicky. Sonic buys a cake from a nearby bakery, and everyone wishes Amy a happy birthday. At his base, Eggman and his henchmen lament his plan's failure. A short epilogue follows where Barry explains that, following the incident, the citizens reclaimed control of the train system from Eggman. The player is then given multiple choices to decide what happens to Barry afterwards.

== Development and release ==
The Murder of Sonic the Hedgehog was developed by the Sonic social media team, led by the social media manager Katie Chrzanowski. Development lasted over one year. She had the idea of making a game for social media during her first month at Sega, but did not have the resources, so the idea was shelved. The idea resurfaced at the premiere of the 2020 Sonic the Hedgehog film, where Chrzanowski met with who would become the game's core team. In 2021, Chrzanowski pitched her idea for creating a game to her manager and chief brand officer who gave her the resources and permission necessary to start pursuing the game's development.

Development started with a group of less than ten people who wrote the story before expanding to include staff from other Sega departments including Quality Assurance and marketing. In late February or early March 2022, Chrzanowski presented multiple ideas and game genres to the core team before settling on a murder mystery visual novel. The team chose to make a visual novel as they believed it would help increase the chances of the game going viral. Additionally, the visual novel format allowed the project to cost less than making a role-playing game or platformer, which would allow the game to be available for free. The birthday party angle helped the team to build tension, as it allowed players to speculate as to whether Sonic was actually dead.

After settling on the genre and other core ideas, the team internally pitched the game as The Murder of Sonic the Hedgehog at the end of March and development work started. Chrzanowski estimated that it took around three months to complete the rough draft of the game's story. While the story was being worked on, lead game designer and programmer Greg Batha started working on the game's systems. The team worked on the game part-time alongside their day jobs at Sega.

Chrzanowski cited Agatha Christie's novel Murder on the Orient Express as the game's main inspiration. The game was also inspired by the Victorian murder mystery party theme, and characters were matched to roles that the development team felt made sense for them or would provide for the best humor. The team found most of the characters easy to assign to a typical murder mystery role, whereas Espio was changed from a doctor to poet. The team also looked to Sonic the Hedgehog comics to help explore character backstories. The team involved in the project were inspired by other video game series, including Ace Attorney and Danganronpa. The team was also inspired by a chapter in Paper Mario: The Thousand-Year Door that had Mario participate in a murder mystery on a train.

The new protagonist, Barry, was created so the player could interact with all of the characters from the eyes of a third party. The development team considered letting the player choose one of the recurring characters to play as, but ultimately decided against it, as the first-person perspective of a visual novel would prevent the player from seeing the protagonist. When developing the "Think" minigame, Batha looked to the special stages in Sonic the Hedgehog 2 for inspiration.

Cream the Rabbit and Charmy Bee were not included as suspects in the game because the team considered them too young to participate in a murder mystery game. Chrzanowski would have liked to include characters from the Sonic the Hedgehog IDW comic series.

As the visual novel genre had often been used for April Fools' Day jokes, the development team wanted to be respectful of those who enjoyed the genre rather than poking fun at them. Members of the development team had previously worked on games in the genre, including Batha's work on Dream Daddy and art director Ellen Alsop's work on Goodbye Volcano High. The game contains Easter eggs and references for long time Sonic fans. Several references to other Sega properties were made throughout the game. Signs in several train cars make references to stages in the Sonic series, including the Nights into Dreams-inspired inspired pinball game in Sonic Adventure, Music Plant Zone from Sonic Advance 2, and Colosseum Highway from Sonic Rivals. Dialogue references Sonic Unleashed and implies that The Murder of Sonic takes place after the events of Sonic Frontiers.

The Murder of Sonic the Hedgehog was released without prior announcement on March 31, 2023 on Steam for PC and Mac as an April Fools' Day joke. Prior to the game's launch, the official Sonic Twitter account teased the release, writing that they had been listening to fans and that the series was heading in a new direction. Regarding whether or not the game's story is canon, the Steam page for the game notes that it is not a Sonic Team game, but that they "strongly believe in the power of headcanon".

== Reception ==
Reception

Aggregate scores
Aggregator	Score
Metacritic	82/100
OpenCritic	89% recommend

Review scores
Publication	Score
MeriStation	8/10
PC Gamer (US)	80/100
RPGFan	89/100
Multiplayer.it	8/10
Sports Illustrated	6/10
Vandal	8/10

According to the review aggregate website Metacritic, The Murder of Sonic the Hedgehog received "generally favorable reviews". Audra Bowling of RPGFan praised the game's art style and writing. Grayson Morley of Polygon likewise praised the art style and also praised the game for how it went beyond expectations of a free April Fools' Day joke game with its art, humor, music and sincerity. Morley also commended Sega for taking a risk and "killing" their mascot, something he claimed Nintendo would never do with Mario. Alex Donaldson of Eurogamer noted that part of Sonic series producer Takashi Iizuka's efforts to "save" the series image has been through a pivot to fans. He noted that this pivot had improved the reputation of the franchise, specifically citing Sonic Mania and The Murder of Sonic as examples of fan-made creations that the Japanese publisher would normally not authorize. Will Nelson of PCGamesN described the game as an example of how Sega understood fans and why the series continued to succeed.

Eurogamer also noted that the game was received positively by players, with its Steam user reviews in its first weekend of release garnering it an "overwhelmingly positive" rating. Sega stated that their attempt to "surprise and delight" series fans with the game proved to be successful. Lauren Bergin of PCGamesN, a self-described "avid fan of all things Sonic", expressed her delight in seeing a game in the series perform well after recent games in the series failed to impress her. The game was downloaded more than one million times in its first week, and topped two million downloads by May. As of April 6, 2023, the game was the highest-rated Sonic title on Steam according to user reviews, and peaked at the 61st highest-rated game on the platform.
