= Sonic Free Riders =

2010 video game

- Box art
- Developer: Sonic Team
- Publisher: Sega
- Director: Kenjiro Morimoto
- Producer: Kenjiro Morimoto
- Artist: Hideaki Moriya
- Writer: Yasushi Otake
- Composers: Tomonori Sawada; Koji Sakurai
- Series: Sonic the Hedgehog
- Platform: Xbox 360
- Release: NA: November 4, 2010; EU: November 10, 2010; AU: November 18, 2010; JP: November 20, 2010
- Genre: Racing
- Modes: Single-player, multiplayer

Sonic Free Riders (Note: Japanese: ソニック フリーライダーズ, Hepburn: Sonikku Furī Raidāzu) is a 2010 racing video game developed by Sonic Team and published by Sega for the Xbox 360. The game requires the use of Microsoft's Kinect peripheral for its motion controls and served as one of its launch titles in November 2010. Sonic Free Riders is the seventh racing game in the Sonic the Hedgehog series, and the third entry in the Sonic Riders trilogy, following Sonic Riders: Zero Gravity. The game's story centers on a World Grand Prix hosted by a disguised Doctor Eggman, who secretly plans to gather data from the competitors to program into his robots.

Free Riders is notable as the first work in the franchise to feature Roger Craig Smith as the English voice of Sonic; to date, he still voices the character in all Sonic the Hedgehog video games and some other media. The game received generally unfavorable reviews from critics, mainly due to the game's motion controls, which were often described as unresponsive and inaccurate. However, some praised its presentation, multiplayer capability, and amount of content.

== Gameplay ==
An example of gameplay in Sonic Free Riders

Sonic Free Riders is a hoverboard racing game featuring characters from the Sonic the Hedgehog franchise. The game is controlled (and can only be controlled) via the kinect by using the player's body to navigate their chosen character through the course. Actions include bending their body to steer, performing kicking motions to increase speed, and jumping to perform tricks which earn more boost. The player alternatively has the ability to ride bikes, controlled by steering motions. By collecting enough rings, players can increase their level during each race, which enhances their attributes. There are several power-ups and weapons which each require specific motion actions to activate, such as a missile which is thrown like a football or a boost that is activated by shaking a soda can. As before in previous games, characters are divided into Speed, Flight, and Power classes, each of which can access specific shortcuts. Players can equip special attributes to their Gear, such as improved cornering or the ability to break through barriers, which can be changed by switching the riding stance. Players can also perform special moves if they are falling behind in races.

The game's main single-player campaign is the Grand Prix mode, where players select from one of four teams of characters to play through the story. Unlike past Sonic Riders titles, Free Riders takes a more arcade-style approach to storytelling, omitting full CGI and in-game cutscenes in favor of static character images and short dialogue exchanges between races. Along with Time Attack and Free Race modes, Sonic Free Riders also features a few multiplayer modes that can be played cooperatively. Tag Mode allows two players to race together, requiring synchronized coordination to perform combined tricks, while Relay mode, playable with up to 4 players, requires teammates to swap places after each lap. The local multiplayer supports up to two active players, while online player multiplayer features one active player per console for up to eight players. The game also supports voice recognition, allowing players to navigate menus using their voices.

=== Characters ===
- Amy Rose
- Avatar
- Blaze the Cat
- Cream the Rabbit
- Dr. Eggman
- E-10000G (Note: An alternate version, E-10000B, is playable only in Grand Prix mode)
- Jet the Hawk
- Knuckles the Echidna
- Metal Sonic
- Miles "Tails" Prower
- Rouge the Bat
- Shadow the Hedgehog
- Silver the Hedgehog
- Sonic the Hedgehog
- Storm the Albatross
- Vector the Crocodile
- Wave the Swallow

== Plot ==
Doctor Eggman, disguising himself as "King Doc of Toreggmania", announces another World Grand Prix and promises vast riches to the winners. Though everyone sees through the disguise, four teams — Team Heroes, Team Babylon, Team Rose, and Team Dark — enter the competition, each seeking to prove themselves the best or win the prize.

At the award ceremony, Eggman reveals himself and his true motive: to gather data from all the racers to program into the ultimate Extreme Gear. The other racers defeat Eggman, but his E-10000B robot reveals itself to be a disguised Metal Sonic, who deceived Eggman and stole the data for himself. Metal Sonic challenges Sonic to a final race, but loses and is forced to flee. Though many competitors are disappointed that the promised treasure was fake, they are happy to have enjoyed their time racing.

== Development ==
The game's soundtrack was written by Tomonori Sawada and Koji Sakurai. The game's theme song, "Free", was written by Jun Senoue, with lyrics written by Johnny Gioeli and performed by Chris Madin. An additional cover of the song performed by Senoue's and Gioeli's band, Crush 40, was included on the game's official soundtrack.

Sonic Free Riders, alongside Sonic Colors, marks the first title to be released following a major recasting of the series' voice actors in 2010. Sonic titles released between 2005 and mid-2010 featured voice actors from the cast of the Sonic X anime, recorded at 4Kids Productions in New York City. However, Free Riders features an entirely new cast of actors under the direction of Jack Fletcher, recorded at Studiopolis in Los Angeles, with only Mike Pollock reprising his role as Doctor Eggman. Although both voice language tracks are included in the game disc, the text and voice language is determined by the console's region settings, with no in-game option to change them, with English voices being used in English, French, German, Italian and Spanish, and Japanese voices being used in Japanese. The voice changes resulted in mixed reactions from critics and fans of the series.

== Reception ==
Reception

Aggregate scores
Aggregator	Score
GameRankings	51.27%
Metacritic	47/100

Review scores
Publication	Score
1Up.com	D
Game Informer	5.75/10
GameSpot	4.5/10
GamesRadar+	2/5
GameTrailers	4.5/10
IGN	7.5/10
Joystiq	1/5
Official Xbox Magazine (US)	7.5/10
VideoGamer.com	3/10

The game received “generally unfavorable reviews”, according to review aggregator website Metacritic. Many reviewers panned its motion controls, which they felt ruined the game and made it a bad launch title for the Kinect. IGN was one of few publishers to give a positive review, calling it a strong launch title for Kinect, although criticizing the motion controls stating that they "make it hard to just jump into the game". Some commended its amount of content, number of multiplayer options, graphics and storyline. Official Xbox Magazine also gave it 7.5, praising the wealth of content and multiplayer options while criticizing occasional unresponsiveness in the controls. GameTrailers gave the game a score of 4.5, panning cumbersome controls that tax the body. Joystiq gave the game 1/5 stars, calling it "the equivalent of patting your head while rubbing your stomach while riding a unicycle." Brian Crecente of Kotaku also reviewed it negatively, calling it "the most broken of the Kinect titles I've played." Kotaku's Crecente later reported that the responsiveness of the controls seemed to differ between persons, with fellow reviewer Stephen Totilo saying the controls worked fine for him.

Common Sense Media gave the game two stars out of five, saying "hover board racer for Kinect suffers serious control issues".

=== Legacy ===
In 2023, a fan-made mod was released in which the game can be controlled with traditional button inputs in place of the Kinect.

Since Free Riders, Extreme Gear were absent from later Sonic racing games, until the release of the kart racing game Sonic Racing: CrossWorlds (2025), which features Extreme Gear as a vehicle choice.
