= List of Sonic the Hedgehog characters =

A variety of Sonic characters gathered. From left to right: Team Chaotix (Espio the Chameleon, Vector the Crocodile, Charmy Bee), Knuckles the Echidna, Silver the Hedgehog, Amy Rose, Doctor Eggman, Sonic the Hedgehog, Rouge the Bat, Miles "Tails" Prower, Big the Cat, Shadow the Hedgehog, Cheese the Chao, Cream the Rabbit, and Blaze the Cat.

The Sonic the Hedgehog video game franchise began in 1991 with the video game Sonic the Hedgehog for the Sega Genesis, which pitted a blue anthropomorphic hedgehog named Sonic against a rotund male human villain named Doctor Eggman (or Doctor Ivo Robotnik). The sequel, Sonic 2, gave Sonic a fox friend named Tails. Sonic CD introduced Amy Rose, a female hedgehog with a persistent crush on Sonic. Sonic 3 introduced Knuckles the Echidna, Sonic's rival and later friend. All five of these have remained major characters and appeared in dozens of games.

The series has introduced dozens of additional recurring characters over the years. These have ranged from anthropomorphic animal characters such as Shadow the Hedgehog and Cream the Rabbit to robots created by Eggman such as Metal Sonic and E-123 Omega, as well as human characters such as Eggman's grandfather Gerald Robotnik. The series features three fictional species, in order of appearance: Chao, which have usually functioned as digital pets and minor gameplay and plot elements; Wisps, which have been used as power-ups; and Koco, which when collected grant new abilities for Sonic, among other things.

The Sonic games keep a separate continuity from the Sonic the Hedgehog comics published by Archie Comics and other Sonic media and, as a result, feature a distinct yet overlapping array of many characters.

== Characters ==
=== Sonic the Hedgehog ===
Sonic the Hedgehog (Note: Japanese: ソニック・ザ・ヘッジホッグ, Hepburn: Sonikku Za Hejjihoggu) is a blue anthropomorphic hedgehog and the main protagonist of the series. Developed as a replacement for their existing Alex Kidd mascot, as well as Sega's response to Mario, his first appearance was in the arcade game Rad Mobile as a cameo, before making his official debut in Sonic the Hedgehog (1991). Sonic's greatest ability is his running speed, and he is known as the world's fastest hedgehog. Using the power of the seven Chaos Emeralds, he becomes Super Sonic and can achieve even greater speeds.

=== Doctor Eggman ===
Doctor Ivo Robotnik, (Note: Japanese: ロボトニック, Hepburn: Robotonikku) better known by his alias Doctor Eggman, (Note: Japanese: ドクター・エッグマン, Hepburn: Dokutā Egguman) is a human mad scientist and the main antagonist of the series. Debuting in the first game of the series, Sonic the Hedgehog, he was shown attempting to collect the Chaos Emeralds and turn all of the animals inhabiting the land into robots. He is a self-proclaimed or certifiable genius with an IQ of 300. His fondness for mechas has made him a renowned authority on robotics. Ultimately, Eggman's goal is to conquer the world and create his ultimate utopia, Eggmanland, alternatively known as the Eggman Empire and Robotnikland.

When Sega had petitioned its research and development department to create a character who would replace Alex Kidd as its company mascot, a caricature of U.S. President Theodore Roosevelt was among the proposed designs. It lost to Sonic the Hedgehog, but the design was kept for the basis for Doctor Eggman instead.

=== Miles "Tails" Prower ===
Miles Prower, (Note: Japanese: マイルス・パウアー, Hepburn: Mairusu Pauā) better known by his nickname, Tails, (Note: Japanese: テイルス, Hepburn: Teirusu) is a two-tailed fox who is Sonic's best friend and sidekick. His name is a pun on "miles per hour". He can use his tails to propel himself into the air like a helicopter for a limited time. Yasushi Yamaguchi, originally the main artist and zone designer for Sega's Sonic Team, designed Tails for an internal competition for a sidekick to Sonic. His first appearance was in Sonic 2 for the Game Gear, where he was kidnapped by Doctor Robotnik for a "hefty" ransom. He was first made playable in the Genesis version of Sonic the Hedgehog 2. Tails has appeared in almost every Sonic game since his first appearance. Tails starred in two solo spin-off games for the Game Gear in 1995 – Tails' Skypatrol, and Tails Adventure. Frequently portrayed as a sweet-natured and humble fox, Tails used to be picked on because of his twin tails, before he met Sonic. Tails is very clever and has excellent mechanical skills.

=== Amy Rose ===
Voiced by:

English: Jennifer Douillard (1999–2004), Lisa Ortiz (2003–2010), Cindy Robinson (2010–present), Shannon Chan-Kent (Sonic Prime), Kristen Bell (live-action films)
Japanese: Taeko Kawata

Amy Rose (Note: Japanese: エミー・ローズ, Hepburn: Emī Rōzu) is a pink hedgehog and Sonic's self-proclaimed girlfriend, (Note: Attributed to multiple references:) who is an energetic tomboy. She was originally conceived when the character division of Sega's licensing business requested a female counterpart for Sonic, aiming to establish a dynamic similar to Disney's Mickey Mouse and Minnie Mouse. However, during her creation, developers felt that binding Sonic to a conventional, mutual relationship clashed with his established personality, and opted for a one-way relationship instead, in which Amy's affection for Sonic is unrequited. Amy was created by Naoto Ohshima and artist Kazuyuki Hoshino for Sonic CD (1993), although she appeared in Kenji Terada's Sonic the Hedgehog manga a year before. Ohshima created the original character design, and Hoshino finalized the design and created her in-game graphics, with many staff members contributing ideas to her design. Her headband and trainer shoes reflected Ohshima's tastes, and her mannerisms reflected the traits that Hoshino looked for in women at the time. An early grayscale concept sketch of Amy for Sonic CD shows her very similar to her finalised appearance in the game except for her shoes, which were made larger. The character had another name in early game previews: Rosy the Rascal. Additionally, due to a localization effort by Sega of America in the North American manual for Sonic CD, Amy Rose was erroneously referred to as Princess Sally. Sega of America made this choice to capitalize on the popularity of SatAM and its tie-in Archie comics, where Princess Sally Acorn was the prominent female lead—despite Amy Rose being a distinct Japanese-original character. Amy received her present design, with a red dress and knee-high leather boots, in Sonic Adventure (1998), courtesy of designer Yuji Uekawa.

In the games, Amy is depicted as driven and competitive. She spends much of her time following Sonic to get his attention or make sure he is safe while demonstrating her affection. Series co-creator Yuji Naka said that Amy was designed "to always chase Sonic", but stated that Sonic "will not ever get married". An early character design document stated that Amy was also to be a high school cheerleader. Not possessing the speed or strength of the other characters, Amy uses her signature weapon, the Piko Piko Hammer, to defend herself instead. In Sonic CD, Metal Sonic kidnaps Amy and Sonic must rescue her. When he does, Amy kisses him. Her voice samples in the game were made using the Yamaha YM2612's FM Sound Source module. Amy's first appearance in a Sonic platformer as a playable character was in Sonic Adventure; although the first game to have her playable is Sonic Drift. She was meant to make her first playable appearance in the main series with Sonic X-treme before the game was ultimately cancelled. Amy was also intended to make an appearance in Knuckles' Chaotix, but she was scrapped from the game before release, and only appears as a small cameo in the sound test. She is playable in Sonic Heroes (2003) (Note: Attributed to multiple references:) and Sonic the Hedgehog (2006), and appears as a non-player character in games such as Sonic Unleashed (2008).

While some journalists have called Amy cute and powerful, others find her annoying. Justin Towell of GamesRadar+ and writers from Mean Machines expressed general displeasure at her introduction in Sonic CD. Additionally, some have criticized developers' treatment of Amy as a female character and analyzed her implications on gender representation in video games. The Electronic Gaming Monthly staff found her pink coloring and tendency to run from danger to be stereotypical and common in Japanese-created female characters, while feminist blogger Anita Sarkeesian cites Amy as an example of the "Ms. Male Character" trope, in which female characters in games with male protagonists often resemble those protagonists, but with stereotypically feminine features added. Despite this, Amy is one of the series' most popular characters, coming in fifth place in a Japanese popularity poll in 2006 and sixth place in a 2025 poll conducted by Dengeki Online. Her likeness has been used in Sonic merchandise, and she appears in the television adaptations Sonic X (2003–2005), Sonic Boom (2014–2017) and Sonic Prime (2022–2024). Amy is introduced in the live-action film series in Sonic the Hedgehog 3 (2024), appearing in a mid-credits scene saving Sonic from an army of Metal Sonics. She is set to feature in the upcoming Sonic the Hedgehog 4, voiced by Kristen Bell.

=== Metal Sonic ===
Voiced by:

English: Gary Dehan (OVA), Ryan Drummond (2003), Ray Chase (2024)
Japanese: Masami Kikuchi (OVA), Jun'ichi Kanemaru (2003, 2024)

Metal Sonic (Note: Japanese: メタル・ソニック, Hepburn: Metaru Sonikku) is an evil robotic version of Sonic created by Dr. Robotnik. He possesses great strength, including a laser cannon, a jet engine and a force field device he can use to protect himself from projectiles and certain attacks. He usually only communicates with a series of electronic noises.

The character first appears in Sonic the Hedgehog CD. He is given orders to go back in time and change the past so that Dr. Eggman can rule the future. Sonic must race him in Stardust Speedway to free Amy Rose. He is severely wounded when he crashes and falls, but is rejuvenated by Robotnik in Sonic the Hedgehog 4: Episode II, only to be defeated again in a similar style. He returns in Knuckles' Chaotix, where he attempts to obtain the Chaos Rings, but he is stopped by the Chaotix team. Metal Sonic notably acted as the main antagonist in Sonic Heroes, appearing in a new form as Neo Metal Sonic before transforming into the game's final boss, Metal Overlord. Upon being defeated by Super Sonic, Tails, and Knuckles, he reverts to his traditional appearance.

Metal Sonic appears as a bonus playable character in Sonic Rivals, reprogrammed to aid Eggman Nega in his attempt to take over the world. He returns as a playable character in Sonic Rivals 2, under orders from Eggman to aid Shadow in stopping Eggman Nega's plans. In Sonic Free Riders, Metal Sonic is a playable character and the final opponent in the game's story mode. In Sonic Generations, he appears in his classic form as a rival boss, battling Classic Sonic in Stardust Speedway before ultimately being destroyed. In the 2024 remaster Sonic X Shadow Generations, his Metal Overlord form returns as a boss that Shadow battles. Metal Sonic returns as a boss character in Sonic Boom: Rise of Lyric and Sonic Boom: Shattered Crystal, and the Sonic story mode of Lego Dimensions.

Metal Sonic appeared as a playable character in the multiplayer mode of Sonic Adventure 2: Battle, as well as Sonic & Sega All-Stars Racing, Sonic & All-Stars Racing Transformed, and all the Mario & Sonic titles beginning with Mario & Sonic at the Olympic Winter Games. Collecting all the emblems in Sonic Adventure DX: Director's Cut unlocks Metal Sonic as a bonus playable character in Sonic's stages, and purchasing both episodes of Sonic the Hedgehog 4 unlocks bonus levels in which Metal Sonic is playable.

Outside of the games, Metal Sonic appears as the main antagonist in the Sonic the Hedgehog OVA, where Eggman records Sonic's abilities and uploads them to Metal Sonic, who proceeds in attempting to destroy the world before being tossed into lava by Sonic. He appears in the Sonic Boom episodes, "It Wasn't Me, It Was the One-Armed Hedgehog" and "Eggman the Video Game Part 2: The End of the World".

Multiple Metal Sonics also appear in the mid-credits scene of Sonic the Hedgehog 3 (2024). The character is expected to appear in the upcoming Sonic the Hedgehog 4 film. It is unknown at this time if he will be silent (as is the case for most incarnations of the character), or if he will be given a speaking voice, which film series director Jeff Fowler stated in January 2025 was yet to be decided.

GameDaily placed Metal Sonic 13th on their "Top 25 Video Game Robots" list, describing him as Dr. Robotnik's "greatest creation" and praising the strength of his abilities.

=== Knuckles the Echidna ===
Knuckles the Echidna (Note: Japanese: ナックルズ・ザ・エキドゥナ, Hepburn: Nakkurusu Za Ekiduna) is a red echidna and one of Sonic's friendly rivals. First introduced in the Genesis game Sonic the Hedgehog 3, Knuckles lives on Angel Island, which hovers in the sky due to the power of the Master Emerald. As the last surviving member of the Echidna people who once inhabited the island, his duty is to guard the Master Emerald.

During conception of Sonic the Hedgehog 3, the development team wanted to create a new rival for Sonic. The final design of Knuckles was the result of dozens of possible designs inspired by numerous different animals. A character with many different abilities and skills, he is physically one of the strongest characters of the Sonic series. His strength and mastery of martial arts, specializing in punches, enables him to perform feats such as shattering boulders with his fists, while he can trap air underneath his dreadlocks in order to glide for short distances.

=== Fang the Sniper ===
Fang the Sniper, (Note: Japanese: ファング・ザ・スナイパ, Hepburn: Fangu Za Sunaipā) initially known as Nack the Weasel in English localizations, is a purple jerboa that first appeared in the Game Gear video game Sonic the Hedgehog: Triple Trouble in 1994. His character is a treasure hunter in search of the Chaos Emeralds; however, he does not know of their true power and merely wants to sell them for profit. He is a slick, sneaky, and mischievous character who will steal the Emeralds for an easier job. Fang tries hard to outwit others, but is held back by his clumsiness and often fails.

Fang was designed by Shinichi Higashi (also known as "Touma"), who worked for Sega between 1994 and 2002 and later began working as a freelance figure artist and toy designer. He was initially designed to have a gangster-like appearance and use a realistic firearm, but was later redesigned to wear explorer attire and given a popgun instead. Tadashi Ihoroi, a planner and designer on Triple Trouble, created the character's personality and background.

Outside of Triple Trouble, Fang has had playable roles in Sonic Drift 2 and Sonic the Fighters in 1995 and 1996, and had been planned to be in the cancelled Sonic Xtreme. He did not have any significant roles for over two decades however, though he did make a cameo appearance on an in-game poster in 2011's Sonic Generations, and as an illusion during the boss fight with Heavy Magician in Sonic Mania in 2017. In 2023, he was announced to be returning in a main role as a central villain in Sonic Superstars, now under the name "Fang the Hunter"; a tie-in comic released by Sega prior to the game's launch offered the in-fiction explanation that Fang frequently operates under different aliases in order to conduct his criminal activities.

=== Chaotix Detective Agency ===
The Chaotix are a group of initially four characters who debuted in the game Knuckles' Chaotix as the main characters, later forming their own detective agency in Sonic Heroes where only three of them (Vector, Espio and Charmy respectively) returned, after the three were redesigned and rebooted into essentially new characters. IGN described the characters as "charming" and noted that they were introduced before fans became weary of all the new characters in the series. In 2026, the Chaotix would star as the leads in an 8 episode audio drama podcast series Sonic the Hedgehog Presents: The Chaotix Casefiles, which follows the group solving a mystery case in the style of a noir-inspired detective radio drama, narrated by Vector.

==== Vector the Crocodile ====
Voiced by:

English: Marc Biagi (2004), Carter Cathcart (2004–2006), Dan Green (2007–2010), Keith Silverstein (2010–present)
Japanese: Kenta Miyake

Vector the Crocodile (Note: Japanese: ベクター・ザ・クロコダイル, Hepburn: Bekutā Za Kurokodairu) is a large crocodile who is the "head honcho" and brains of the Chaotix Detective Agency. Divided between being both "bossy" and "easy-going", his rough speech and outward appearance mask his clear reasoning and high competence in solving cases. For the right price he will take on most jobs, unless they involve doing something immoral. Vector has a strong sense of justice and kindness, despite his argumentative nature. He often does unpaid work due to his charitable nature, such as finding a lost child or taking up meager chases for children, leaving the agency constantly short on money. Vector hates having to work for the landlord, but he enjoys singing, and his trademark accessory is a set of headphones. He is physically formidable to the point of being comparable to Knuckles, with his powerful jaws being his most reliable weapon.

Vector was, originally, supposed to be in the sound test of the first Sonic the Hedgehog game as part of a rock band that Sonic was part of, but the band and the feature itself were removed prior to its release. Vector and the band made a brief appearance in the promotional manga Sonic the Hedgehog Story Comic. Vector then made his official game debut in the 1995 video game Knuckles' Chaotix. And in 2003, he was part of Team Chaotix in Sonic Heroes and is featured in Shadow the Hedgehog, Sonic Generations, Sonic Forces and several other games (alongside both Espio and Charmy in said games). In all instalments of Mario & Sonic at the Olympic Games, he is a playable athlete. He has also been playable in other spinoff titles such as Sonic Free Riders and Team Sonic Racing, and mobile games like Sonic Forces: Speed Battle and Sonic Dash.

Vector was also the one of only mainline game characters to appear in the Sonic Boom franchise, making his debut into the sub-franchise in the season two episode "Vector Detector". He later made a few cameo appearances such as in the finale. Like the other characters he was redesigned for the series, sporting an arm tattoo and a leather jacket in place of his traditional headphones. In 2021, he was later added as a playable character in the tie-in mobile game Sonic Dash 2: Sonic Boom. Vector also made a cameo in the film franchise in the Sonic the Hedgehog 2: The Official Movie Pre-quill comic.

==== Espio the Chameleon ====
Voiced by:

English: Bill Corkery (2004), David Wills (2004–2010), Troy Baker (2010–2013), Matthew Mercer (2016–present)
Japanese: Yuuki Masuda

Espio the Chameleon (Note: Japanese: エスピオ・ザ・カメレオン, Hepburn: Esupio Za Kamereon) is a chameleon who is a ninja warrior. He is described as the "opinionated number one" of the Chaotix, also being the calmest. He has a "militaristic discipline" while being quiet and laid back. Confident in his skills, opinionated and self-obsessed, he revels in training and self-discipline. He is not concerned by danger, and often yearns to face it in order to use his ninja skills. With his extensive training in ninjutsu and an ability to turn himself invisible, he is able to move around unnoticed. However, a blunder like a sneeze could cause him to inadvertently become visible.

Espio's debut was in the video game Knuckles' Chaotix. In the game, his color subtly changes while he moves to demonstrate the technical capabilities of the Sega 32X console. Espio was incorporated into Sonic Heroes as part of a move to reintroduce neglected characters, and because the development team considered him to have a unique, interesting personality. He was the designated "speed" character in Sonic Heroes while teammates Vector the Crocodile and Charmy Bee respectively represented "power" and "flight". Espio was added to Shadow the Hedgehog and Sonic Rivals 2 to help "round out our cast of characters", and because designer Takashi Iizuka appreciated the character's "stealthy agility". Espio appeared as a playable character in the arcade fighting game Sonic the Fighters, and has also appeared in all installments of Mario & Sonic at the Olympic Games as the referee in various events and later a playable athlete. Espio also made a cameo in the film franchise in the film Sonic the Hedgehog 2: The Official Movie Pre-quill comic.

==== Charmy Bee ====
Voiced by:

English: Emily Corkery (2004), Amy Birnbaum (2004–2010), Colleen O'Shaughnessey (2010–present)
Japanese: Yoko Teppouzuka

Charmy Bee (Note: Japanese: チャーミー・ビー, Hepburn: Chāmī Bī) is a bee who is the "scatter-brained funny-kid" of the Chaotix. He is cheerful, curious, playful, careless, and greatly energetic, often talking about things no one else cares about. Charmy's childish tomfoolery makes the rest of the detective agency staff look professional, and he is seen by others as a "cute mascot". Despite an innocent, good-natured and light-hearted personality, he uses his stinger on rare occasions where he gets angry. In addition to being a playable character in Sonic Heroes and Shadow the Hedgehog, he made cameos in all the Mario & Sonic at the Olympic Games installments as a referee.

=== Mighty the Armadillo ===
Mighty the Armadillo (Note: Japanese: マイティー・ザ・アルマジロ, Hepburn: Maitī Za Arumajiro) is a black and red armadillo who debuted in the arcade game SegaSonic the Hedgehog and later appeared in the 32X game Knuckles' Chaotix. The character is described as a traveler who loves nature and desires to see every place. Mighty hates to see weaknesses in others and detests violence. He prefers to be gentle but is capable of fighting back when needed. Mighty's only appearance as part of the Chaotix was in Knuckles' Chaotix, and was absent when the rest of the group was reintroduced into the series with Sonic Heroes in 2003.

His long period of absence was alluded to in Sonic Generations, in which he is shown on a missing persons poster alongside fellow SegaSonic character Ray the Flying Squirrel. Both Mighty and Ray appeared as playable characters in the Sonic Mania expansion Sonic Mania Plus, as well as appearing in the accompanying web series Sonic Mania Adventures.

=== Ray the Flying Squirrel ===
Ray the Flying Squirrel (Note: Japanese: レイ・ザ・フライングスクイレル, Hepburn: Rei Za Furaingusukuireru) is a yellow flying squirrel who debuted in the arcade game SegaSonic the Hedgehog. While he can run as fast as Sonic, Ray can also climb trees and glide.

His long period of absence was alluded to in Sonic Generations, in which he is shown on a missing persons poster during the City Escape level alongside fellow SegaSonic character Mighty the Armadillo. Both Ray and Mighty appeared as playable characters in the Sonic Mania expansion Sonic Mania Plus, as well as appearing in the accompanying web series Sonic Mania Adventures.

=== Big the Cat ===
Voiced by:

English: Jon St. John (1998–2004), Oliver Wyman (2003–2010, 2016), Kyle Hebert (2010–present), Ian Hanlin (Sonic Prime)
Japanese: Shun Yashiro (1998–2000), Takashi Nagasako (2003–present)

Big the Cat (Note: Japanese: ビッグ・ザ・キャット, Hepburn: Biggu za Kyatto) first appeared in the 1998 Dreamcast game Sonic Adventure, where he was placed to justify the presence of a fishing rod in the game, although he was conceived beforehand. Big is a large, purple anthropomorphic cat, who is depicted as—while unintelligent—sweet, easygoing, and physically strong.

In Sonic Adventure, Big's story involves fishing his frog friend Froggy (Note: Japanese: カエルくん, Hepburn: Kaeru-kun) out of various bodies of water after Froggy swallows a Chaos Emerald and part of the tail of Chaos, the game's antagonist. In Sonic Heroes, Big teams up with Amy Rose and Cream the Rabbit to search for Froggy and a lost Chao called Chocola. He is a minor playable character in other Sonic games, like Sonic Chronicles: The Dark Brotherhood and Sonic & Sega All-Stars Racing, and a non-player character in games such as the Nintendo DS version of Sonic Colors. Reflecting the story of Adventure, Big appears in the Sonic X anime and the Sonic the Hedgehog comics.

Big has been derided by video game critics for his obesity, low intelligence, one-dimensional development and uselessness within his games; he has appeared on several lists of the worst video game characters of all time and within the Sonic cast, though this has lessened in recent years. Due to his poor reception and apparent uselessness, Sonic Team claimed they would be retiring the character from appearing in future games in 2012, although head Takashi Iizuka has since stated that a game starring Big is a possibility. Despite this statement, Big has continued to appear in other titles in a minor capacity, including Sonic Runners, Lego Dimensions, Team Sonic Racing, and Sonic Frontiers.

The director and screenwriters of the Sonic film series, Jeff Fowler, Patrick Casey, and Josh Miller, have expressed a desire to include Big in the films. According to Casey and Miller, a scene in which a skeleton of a creature resembling Big appeared (which they clarified would have been "not necessarily the Big the Cat") was cut from Sonic the Hedgehog 2's script, as "it didn't make any sense".

=== Chao ===
Voiced by: Tomoko Sasaki

Chao (Note: Japanese: チャオ) (/tʃaʊ/) are small creatures with pudding-like bodies that behave much like human infants. Depending on how they are raised, their form and appearance can change considerably. The Chao are descended from the Ancients, an alien race that brought the Chaos Emeralds to Earth when they crash landed long ago.

Takashi Iizuka stated in an interview with video game publication 1UP.com that Chao were incorporated into Sonic Adventure "so that new players would be forced to go out, explore the action sections, and find Flickies and things." Professor Chao, a minor character in Sonic Adventure 2, states that Chao are cute, and enjoy toys and being held or petted. However, they dislike being held while the player jumps, spins around, or throws them. A Chao's diet consists of tree fruit and coconuts. They hatch from eggs found in Chao Gardens. When the player spends enough time with a Chao in the Chao Garden, it eventually develops into a cocoon and hatches from this as an adult. Eventually it develops into another cocoon. If the Chao has been treated well, the cocoon is pink and the Chao is then reincarnated as an egg; the cycle then restarts and the Chao remembers the player. If, however, it has been treated poorly, the cocoon is gray and the Chao dies, removing every trace of itself from the game. Chao can breed to produce fertile eggs.

Chao were designed as a "relative neutral entity" in this game. However, to remain consistent with the good–evil dichotomy of Sonic Adventure 2, they were designed so that the player could raise them as "Hero Chao" or "Dark Chao". Chao were given the ability to socialize and interact in Sonic Adventure 2 in order to make the game unique, and to more resemble "a real artificial life form." Chao appeared in Sonic the Hedgehog 3, as mascots of the Chao Garden restaurant in Tokyo, Japan.

Chao and the Chao-raising system have received generally positive reviews. In a review of Sonic Adventure, GameSpot's Peter Bartholow stated that "with the Chao-breeding simulation and the minigames, Sonic offers much more beyond the completion of its story." IGN stated that "SA more than has the extras department covered." This enthusiasm was extended to IGN's reviews of Sonic Adventure 2, Sonic Advance, and Sonic Adventure DX: Director's Cut. GameSpot's Shane Satterfield was critical of the Chao raising feature in Sonic Adventure 2: Battle, stating that "there's little in the way of interactivity" and that "the Chao training aspect using the Game Boy Advance is little more than a novelty." However, GameSpy's Shane Bettenhausen praised the feature in the game, comparing Chao to Tamagotchi digital pets. GameSpot's Frank Provo noted the appeal to "those people who might only enjoy pinball in passing" that Chao brought to Sonic Pinball Party. 1UP.com's Chris Baker called the Chao feature in Sega Superstars "ultimately worthless... but some might find it amusing." In a review of Sonic Chronicles: The Dark Brotherhood, GameSpot's Shiva Stella praised the level of strategy that the game's Chao system added. James Stephanie Sterling of Destructoid voiced a similar opinion, though she said that Chao had been "rubbish" in previous games.

==== Chaos ====
Chaos (Note: Japanese: カオス, Hepburn: Kaosu) is a Chao that was mutated by the Chaos Emeralds, becoming a highly intelligent water-like being that can easily manipulate its body. It acts as a guardian for its species, protects the Master Emerald, and provides clear water around its altar. Without any of the Chaos Emeralds, it is known as "Chaos Zero", but with each one it absorbs, it transforms into a more powerful form, eventually becoming "Perfect Chaos" with all seven Chaos Emeralds. It first appears in Sonic Adventure, where Dr. Eggman attempts to use it to conquer the world. Chaos tracks down the emeralds, becomes "Perfect Chaos", and floods all of Station Square, but is ultimately defeated by Super Sonic.

Iizuka stated that he wanted to create an antagonist who would have been impossible to create on older hardware. He settled on one relating to liquid and transparent and created Chaos. Iizuka presented the concept to Naka, who was impressed. Chaos was originally intended to have realistic blue scales in his final form, but this was abandoned because of the technological constraints of the Dreamcast. Chaos would reappear in other games, including as a playable character in the multiplayer modes of Sonic Adventure 2 and Sonic Battle, and as a boss in Sonic Generations with an updated appearance based on its original scaled design concept.

==== Omochao ====
Voiced by:

English: Lani Minella (2001–2004), Rebecca Honig (2007), Laura Bailey (2011–2016), Erica Lindbeck (2019–present)
Japanese: Etsuko Kozakura

Omochao (Note: Japanese: オモチャオ) (/ˈoʊmoʊtʃaʊ/) is a robot Chao with a propeller on its head. Omochao was introduced in Sonic Adventure as part of the Chao Races, and it later appeared in Sonic Adventure 2, where it serves as an in-game manual to teach players how to play the game. It has filled a similar tutorial role in other games such as Sonic Heroes, Sonic Advance 3, Sonic Generations, and Lego Dimensions. The character has made other sporadic appearances throughout the series; its only playable appearance is as one of a group of playable chao in Team Sonic Racing. "Omochao" is a pun on "omocha" (Note: 玩具; toy) and "chao".

=== E-100 Series ===
The E-100 Series is a group of robots created by Doctor Eggman, who uses them in his quest to conquer the world; however, some of their members have since gone rogue.

==== E-100 Alpha ====
E-100 Alpha, (Note: Japanese: アルファ, Hepburn: Arufa) better known as Zero, is the first of the E-100 series and considered the prototype of the line. He was created by Dr. Eggman and ordered to capture the Chaos Emerald from Amy Rose's Flicky friend, Birdie. He first appeared in Sonic Adventure as the main antagonist in Amy's story, where he repeatedly tries to capture Birdie. At the end of Amy's story, she destroys him. In Sonic Advance 2, he appears in special stages, trying to prevent players from getting the seven Chaos Emeralds.

==== E-102 Gamma ====
Voiced by:

English: Steve Broadie (1999–2000), Andrew Rannells (Sonic X)
Japanese: Joji Nakata (1998–2000), Naoki Imamura (Sonic X)

E-102 Gamma (Note: Japanese: E-102ガンマ, Hepburn: Ī-Ichi-Zero-Ni Ganma) also primarily appears in Sonic Adventure. He is a red, bulky robot with a powerful gun built into his arm. Gamma turns against his master after a heartfelt conversation with Amy Rose, who becomes his friend, and destroys the other E-100 Series robots to free the trapped animals inside them before ultimately doing the same to himself. He offers shoot-'em-up gameplay to a largely platforming-focused game. Gamma later made a spiritual return in the form of Chaos Gamma, who appeared as a playable character in Sonic Battle. He has garnered mixed comments from critics. While Xbox World generally commended his story, others criticized the slow and repetitive nature of his gameplay.

==== E-123 Omega ====
Voiced by:

English: Jon St. John (2003), Jeff Kramer (2005, 2009), Maddie Blaustein (2006–2009), Vic Mignogna (2010–2017), Roger Craig Smith (2019–present)
Japanese: Taiten Kusunoki

E-123 Omega (Note: Japanese: オメガ, Hepburn: Omega) first appears in Sonic Heroes, Eggman seals Omega within an abandoned base, along with Shadow, until Rouge the Bat releases Shadow from his stasis pod, accidentally reactivating Omega. Omega expresses a deep hatred for Eggman due to the latter locking him up in stasis for an extended period of time. Omega decides to team up with the other two in order to obtain revenge on Eggman and prove that he is the most powerful robot of all. He returns with the same goal in Shadow the Hedgehog, and teams up with Shadow in certain levels to destroy Eggman's robots.

During Sonic the Hedgehog 2006, he is playable after Rouge orders him to support Shadow many years in the future. He is also one of the secret unlockable characters in Sonic Chronicles: The Dark Brotherhood. Outside of his playable appearances, Omega makes non-playable appearances in several entries, such as Sonic Forces and Shadow Generations, where he is typically depicted working together with Shadow and Rouge as in Sonic Heroes. Omega has appeared in several spinoff entries, including the Mario & Sonic at the Olympic Games series, Team Sonic Racing, and Sonic Racing: CrossWorlds.

Omega has an array of destructive weapons concealed in his arms, including machine guns, flamethrowers, missile launchers, beam cannons and rocket-propelled drills. He can retract his hands in order to attach a spinning Shadow and Rouge in their place, either using the two as melee weapons or firing them. Omega has seen mixed reception. Eurogamer staff writer Tom Bramwell called Omega a "lesser" character among the Heroes cast. An Electronic Gaming Monthly preview of Heroes referred to him as an imitation of the T-1000s from the film Terminator 2: Judgment Day. However, Jeremy Dunham from IGN called Omega a "supreme machine".

=== Shadow the Hedgehog ===
Shadow the Hedgehog (Note: Japanese: シャドウ・ザ・ヘッジホッグ, Hepburn: Shadō Za Hejjihoggu) is an artificially created life form in the design of a black and red male hedgehog, similar to Sonic. His trademark hover skates propel him at extreme speeds that rival those of Sonic. His first appearance is in Sonic Adventure 2.

According to official profiles, Shadow was created 50 years ago by Professor Gerald Robotnik as the "Ultimate Life Form", which is ageless and immortal. Sharp witted and seemingly always on the edge, once he has set himself to a goal, he will do whatever it takes to accomplish it, regardless of any danger. After the trauma of the death of his only friend, Maria Robotnik, Shadow strives to fulfill his purpose and keep the promise he made to her. Although his relationship with Sonic seems to have developed from antagonistic to friendly rivalry, animosity from not understanding each other's mindsets still occurs.

However, Shadow shares a lot of similarities with Sonic. He can perform spin attacks common to Sonic, which are a variation on the tendency for hedgehogs to roll into tight balls for protection. Additionally, with the power of a Chaos Emerald, Shadow can warp time and space with Chaos Control. Shadow is also able to use a variety of other Chaos powers, such as "Chaos Spear" and "Chaos Blast".

Using the power of the seven Chaos Emeralds, Shadow uses his super transformation to transform into Super Shadow and gains new abilities of flight and near invulnerability, with normal abilities of speed and enhanced Chaos powers.

=== Rouge the Bat ===
Voiced by:

English: Lani Minella (2001–2004), Kathleen Delaney (2005–2009), Karen Strassman (2010–present), Kazumi Evans (Sonic Prime)
Japanese: Rumi Ochiai

Rouge the Bat (Note: Japanese: ルージュ・ザ・バット, Hepburn: Rūju Za Batto) is a white, anthropomorphic bat who made her first appearance in Sonic Adventure 2 in 2001, and who has been featured in most games since. She has appeared in every mainline game and most spin-off games alongside Shadow (excluding the Storybook spin-off games). She is depicted as a professional treasure hunter devoted to the pursuit of jewels, calling herself the "World's Greatest Treasure Hunter". She has a tendency to ignore abstract morality or manners for potential profit; her "feminine charm" makes her appear careless, but she is actually scheming and manipulative. Additionally, she serves as a part-time spy for the government, and is a competent fighter. She battles using kicks, especially her signature "Screw Kick", and she can fly using her wings.

Rouge was created by Kazuyuki Hoshino as a "slightly sexy" character, which he noted had not been done in the series before and required substantial trial and error due to her deforume appearance. Rouge's final design was inspired by the perceived "sexiness" of Latin women, particularly Jennifer Lopez, who had recently become popular in Japan. Her elegant kicking style was developed to differentiate her from Knuckles, whom her abilities mirror. Despite receiving a polarized reception with critics initially, Rouge is one of the series' most popular characters, coming in tenth place in a Japanese popularity poll in 2006, making her the second most popular female character in the franchise after Amy Rose. She has been a major character in two television adaptations: Sonic X (2003–2006) and Sonic Prime (2022–2024).

=== Professor Gerald Robotnik ===
Voiced by:

English: Marc Biagi (2001), Mike Pollock (2003–present)
Japanese: Chikao Otsuka (2001–2005), Kotaro Nakamura (2024–present), Kōichi Yamadera (live-action films)

Professor Gerald Robotnik (Note: Japanese: プロフェッサー・ジェラルド・ロボトニック, Hepburn: Purofessā Jerarudo Robotonikku) is the paternal grandfather of Maria Robotnik and Doctor Ivo "Eggman" Robotnik, originally introduced in Sonic Adventure 2. Fifty years before the main series, he constructed the Space Colony ARK and researched immortality for the United Federation in an attempt to create the "Ultimate Life Form", hoping that it could help cure Maria's illness, leading to the creation of Shadow the Hedgehog. However, the failure of an earlier prototype led the United Federation to shut down the project and cover up its existence, with the military organization GUN leading a violent raid on the ARK during which Maria was killed. Fueled by anger over his granddaughter's death and becoming resentful of humanity's increasingly callous nature, Gerald converted the ARK into a doomsday weapon and brainwashed Shadow before being executed, hoping the hedgehog would destroy the world in retribution. The stories of Sonic Battle, Shadow the Hedgehog and Shadow Generations have further expanded on the character's backstory and motivations, including his discovery of the Gizoid and his collaboration with the Black Arms aliens to create Shadow.

Gerald appears in the film Sonic the Hedgehog 3 as the main antagonist, portrayed by Jim Carrey, who also portrays his grandson. In contrast to the video games, the film version of Gerald is still alive in the present instead of being executed following the shutdown of Project Shadow. He helps Shadow escape from GUN's custody and later recruits his grandson to help them activate the Eclipse Cannon to supposedly destroy GUN's headquarters. After he reveals his true intentions to destroy the Earth for Maria's death, Ivo works together with Tails and Knuckles to stop him, with Ivo ultimately killing Gerald with Super Sonic's quill, knocking him into an energy field.

=== Maria Robotnik ===
Voiced by:

English: Moriah Angeline (2001), Rebecca Honig (2005), Stephanie Sheh (2024)
Japanese: Yuri Shiratori, Aoi Yuuki (live-action films)

Maria Robotnik (Note: Japanese: マリア・ロボトニック, Hepburn: Maria Robotonikku) is a character that appears mostly in flashbacks in Sonic Adventure 2 and Shadow the Hedgehog. She is the granddaughter of Professor Gerald Robotnik, and is the cousin of Doctor Ivo "Eggman" Robotnik. Maria suffers from the terminal illness known as "NIDS" (Neuro-Immuno Deficiency Syndrome), which was incurable at the time. Gerald takes on Project Shadow in order to save her life. Soon after Shadow is created, the two form a familial bond, though it is short-lived as the government organization "GUN" soon raids the ARK, fatally shooting Maria. Before she dies, she encases Shadow in an escape pod and asks him to believe in humanity. This experience with Maria scars Shadow for life and initially leads him to attempt to destroy the world, but ultimately his determination to keep his promise to her leads him to team up with Sonic and save the earth multiple times. The relationship between Maria and Shadow is further explored in Shadow Generations and its associated prequel shorts. In the game's story, Shadow is reunited with Maria after she and Gerald are pulled from the past by the Time Eater, and she helps him overcome Black Doom's influence. Though he is tempted to warn them of their fates before they go back, Maria encourages him to move on and continue to protect humanity.

Maria's only playable appearance is in Shadow the Hedgehog, where she can be controlled as a partner character by a second player during specific in-game missions. She appears in the film Sonic the Hedgehog 3, portrayed by Alyla Browne. While her relationship with Shadow in the film is similar to the games, there are a few minor differences with the film version such as her not having a terminal illness and her death being caused by a GUN agent triggering an explosion.

=== Cream the Rabbit and Cheese ===
Voiced by:

English: Sarah Wulfeck (2004), Rebecca Honig (2003–2009), Michelle Ruff (2010–present)
Japanese: Sayaka Aoki (Cream), Ryo Hirohashi (Cheese)

Cream the Rabbit (Note: Japanese: クリーム・ザ・ラビット, Hepburn: Kurīmu Za Rabitto) is a peach-colored rabbit with a constant companion named Cheese, (Note: Japanese: チーズ, Hepburn: Chīzu) a blue Chao with a red bow-tie. Their names are based on "cream cheese". Cream is portrayed as being naive because of being brought up like a princess by her mother, Vanilla. She always politely minds her manners but sometimes acts childishly. In an interview, Sonic Advance 2 director Akinori Nishiyama stated that Cream lost her father at a young age, prompting Vanilla to raise her protectively. Nishiyama clarified that this concept was his personal interpretation and not official lore. Cream can achieve flight for short periods of time by flapping her two large ears, while Cheese often attacks on Cream's behalf by ramming into her adversaries.

Cream first appeared as a playable character in Sonic Advance 2, seeking to rescue her mother from Dr. Eggman. She returned in Sonic Heroes as part of "Team Rose", working together with Amy Rose and Big the Cat to find Cheese's brother Chocola, and then again for Sonic Advance 3.

Since her first trio of games, she has been relegated to being an extra playable character in Sonic spinoffs and multiplayer games. She is a playable character in the Sonic and the Secret Rings multiplayer mode, a playable fighter within Sonic Battle, a secret unlockable party member in Sonic Chronicles: The Dark Brotherhood and a playable racer in Sonic Riders, Sonic Riders: Zero Gravity, and Sonic Free Riders. She also appears as a major character in the Sonic X anime series.

Cream has received mostly negative opinions from the video game press. Thomas East of Official Nintendo Magazine ranked her as the fifth worst Sonic character, criticizing various aspects of her like her high-pitched voice, repetitious speech in Sonic Heroes, "ridiculous smile", and single eyelash on each eye. Christian Nutt of GameSpy singled her out as one of the negative features of Sonic Advance 2, calling her "corny" and "dopey-looking".

GamesRadar writer James Stephanie Sterling ranked her as their second worst, stating that she "represents perhaps everything that's wrong with Sonic the Hedgehog characters", particularly finding her name to be random. Similarly, Tom Bramwell of Eurogamer exclaimed, "Oh, God", at her and Cheese's names. David Houghton of GamesRadar ranked her name as one of the 25 worst among all video game characters, seeing a double entendre in the word "cream". In contrast, Xbox World's review of Heroes stated that "we love Cream" and called her "the best new Sonic character since Tails". The character is also highly regarded in Japan, where she entered the top ten in a 2006 Sonic character popularity poll and a 2025 poll by Dengeki Online.

=== Blaze the Cat ===
Voiced by:

English: Erica Schroeder (2005–2009), Laura Bailey (2010–2016), Erica Lindbeck (2019–present)
Japanese: Nao Takamori

Blaze the Cat (Note: Japanese: ブレイズ・ザ・キャット, Hepburn: Bureizu Za Kyatto) is a purple cat princess from an alternate dimension. She has been appointed as guardian of the Sol Emeralds, her dimension's version of the Chaos Emeralds, making her role similar to that of Knuckles the Echidna. She is portrayed as calm and levelheaded, hiding her true feelings. She is sometimes "bogged down" by her own strict discipline and devotion to her position, making her appear withdrawn. Blaze can control fire, but wears a cape to conceal it as she was teased about her pyrokinetic abilities when she was young. Using the Sol Emeralds, she transforms into Burning Blaze. Blaze wears a purple dress and white tights with pink high heels and a yellow necklace.

Blaze debuted in Sonic Rush as a playable character along with Sonic. She arrives in Sonic's dimension from another dimension along with the Sol Emeralds. While searching for the Emeralds, she befriends Sonic and Cream and helps them stop Dr. Eggman and Eggman Nega before returning to her dimension. She reappears in Sonic the Hedgehog as Silver the Hedgehog's friend during the future of Sonic's dimension. The two attempt to fix their ruined future world by traveling back in time. Blaze ends up sacrificing her life to seal Iblis, the fiery monster that has destroyed their world, inside herself, but is brought back to life at the end of the game when Sonic destroyed Iblis in his own time period. She appeared again as the main character in Sonic Rush Adventure, where Sonic and Tails are transported to her dimension and help her retrieve the "Jeweled Scepter".

Since her first trio of games, she has been relegated to being an extra playable character in Sonic spinoffs and multiplayer games. She is an unlockable multiplayer character in the Sonic and the Secret Rings and Sonic and the Black Knight, a playable racer in Sonic Riders: Zero Gravity, Sonic Free Riders and Team Sonic Racing, and a playable athlete in all five Mario & Sonic at the Olympics games. She appears together with Silver in Sonic Colors DS in several cutscenes and missions. She is also mentioned in Sonic Frontiers.

Blaze has been mostly well received by critics. IGN remarked upon seeing her at TGS 2005 that she "easily earned her place in the team" amidst unremarkable secondary characters. Her gameplay has been praised as "fast-moving and fun" as opposed to slower characters introduced earlier in the series, but criticized for its resemblance to that of Sonic. Blaze has been called "a nice addition to Sonic's cast" and "one of the more complex, multifaceted characters in the Sonic canon". Fan reception is similar, with Blaze ranking as the seventh most popular Sonic character in a 2025 Japanese poll conducted by Dengeki Online.

=== Eggman Nega ===
Voiced by:

English: Mike Pollock
Japanese: Chikao Otsuka (2005–2020)

Eggman Nega (Note: Japanese: エッグマン・ネガ, Hepburn: Egguman Nega) is Eggman's descendant from 200 years in the future, first introduced in Sonic Rush as the arch-nemesis of Blaze the Cat and later Silver the Hedgehog. He is known to cause trouble not only through time travel, but through inter-dimensional travel as well. Although his outward appearance resembles that of Doctor Eggman, his personality is different. He is heartless and calculating, but maintains polite speech and manners. His exact role in the overall series varies; in the Sonic Rush series, he works alongside the original Eggman as a team to take over both Sonic and Blaze's dimensions. In the Sonic Rivals series, Eggman Nega holds a deadly grudge against Eggman due to the latter's failures ruining the former's reputation. His appearances in the Mario & Sonic series act as a mixture of the two portrayals, as Eggman Nega, while still disliking Eggman due to being disappointed at his failures, nevertheless still collaborates with him and assists him with his plans.

=== Black Doom ===
Voiced by:

English: Sean Schemmel (2005), Benjamin Diskin (2024)
Japanese: Ryūzaburō Ōtomo

Black Doom (Note: Japanese: ブラックドゥーム, Hepburn: Burakku Dūmu) is the leader of the Black Arms, an invading alien force that seeks to conquer the Earth and harvest the human species as a source of energy. His first appearance is in Shadow the Hedgehog as the main antagonist, where it is revealed that Shadow was created from his blood by Gerald Robotnik. He attempts to control Shadow using their blood connection, but Shadow resists this and ultimately defeats him.

Black Doom reappears in Shadow Generations as the main antagonist. Having generated a new body since his defeat, he seeks to harness the power of the time anomaly to rebuild his forces and resume their conquest. Though he attempts to turn Shadow into a new host body for himself, he is once again defeated by Shadow.

=== Babylon Rogues ===
The Babylon Rogues are a group of bird thieves. They primarily appear in the Sonic Riders sub-series. Producer Takashi Yuda considered them best-suited for Sonic series racing games and noted in a 2006 interview that Sonic characters are usually designed with one specific storyline in mind. The Babylon Rogues have been the rivals of Team Sonic.

The Rogues have received predominantly negative comments from gaming journalists. Alex Navarro and Joe Dodson of GameSpot separately criticized their clichéd backstory, as did Eurogamer's Tom Bramwell. IGN's Jack DeVries specifically called Jet a "jerk" and stated that his voice is annoying, especially in Free Riders. However, fan reception of Jet has been positive, in which he ranked as the tenth most popular Sonic character in a 2025 Japanese poll by Dengeki Online.

==== Jet the Hawk ====
Voiced by:

English: Jason Griffith (2006–2009), Michael Yurchak (2010–present)
Japanese: Daisuke Kishio

Jet the Hawk (Note: Japanese: ジェット・ザ・ホーク, Hepburn: Jetto Za Hōku) is a green hawk and the leader of the Babylon Rogues, and nicknamed the "Legendary Wind Master" due to his mastery of Extreme Gear. This mastery comes from his forefathers. His skills make him a possible match to Sonic the Hedgehog, whom he considers a rival to him. Jet is aware of his duties as leader but must sometimes be helped by his team. Filled with extreme pride, the thing he likes most other than treasure is himself. He despises losing and those who are faster or more confident than him and fights using Bashyo Fans.

==== Wave the Swallow ====
Voiced by:

English: Erica Schroeder (2006–2008), Kate Higgins (2010–present)
Japanese: Chie Nakamura

Wave the Swallow (Note: Japanese: ウェーブ・ザ・スワロー, Hepburn: Wēbu Za Suwarō) is a purple swallow who is the team's mechanic, as her father was for the previous generation of the Babylon Rogues. Gifted in this craft, she has a superb mechanical knowledge of Extreme Gear, which surpasses both Miles "Tails" Prower and Dr. Eggman. Because of this knowledge, she is full of confidence. She hates thick-headed or stupid people and notices everything, but her advice tends to be understandable only to her. Although she looks on Jet the Hawk as an "unreliable younger brother" and can be stubborn, she follows his leadership.

==== Storm the Albatross ====
Voiced by:

English: Dan Green (2006–2008), Travis Willingham (2010), Fred Tatasciore (2025–present)
Japanese: Kenji Nomura

Storm the Albatross (Note: Japanese: ストーム・ザ・アルバトロス, Hepburn: Sutōmu Za Arubatorosu) is a hulking albatross who is described as the muscle of the Babylon Rogues and Jet the Hawk's "right hand man". The strength of his loyalty to Jet is greater than any other and he hates rivals to the team. When he is angry, he becomes destructive, and the raw power of his physical strength makes up for his lower intelligence and lack of speed. With his quick temper, he may stutter when flustered, and he hates having to wait.

=== Silver the Hedgehog ===
Voiced by:

English: Pete Capella (2006–2009), Quinton Flynn (2010–2017), Bryce Papenbrook (2019–present)
Japanese: Daisuke Ono

Silver the Hedgehog (Note: Japanese: シルバー・ザ・ヘッジホッグ, Hepburn: Shirubā Za Hejjihoggu) is a silver-furred hedgehog from 200 years in the future of the main timeline. He first appeared in the 2006 Sonic the Hedgehog. His individual episode revolves around him traveling back in time with Blaze the Cat to find and slay Sonic the Hedgehog, who they were tricked into believing is the cause of their world being destroyed in the future. Silver's primary ability is telekinesis; he is able to levitate objects and use them as projectiles to either defeat enemies or interact with his environment. Like Sonic and Shadow, he transforms into his "super form" by using the power of the seven Chaos Emeralds.

Silver's creation was inspired by the game's early development stages, where the development team was making huge levels with multiple paths through them and decided they wanted to include a new character with unique abilities for an alternate way to play through the levels. The design team developed over fifty different concepts for the character. At one point he was to actually be an orange mink named Venice (named after the city of the same name), but the developers ultimately decided against this, fearing a mink would not blend in with the rest of the characters. They ended up deciding to make another hedgehog instead.

Orange was originally decided for his fur, but they soon moved away from that in color, in favor of a white-gray one. While developing the character models and textures, they focused on using the hardware to develop the textures rather than just use white-gray, which lead to Silver's color and name. Additionally, Silver's backstory was inspired by Trunks from the 1984–1995 manga Dragon Ball, who made a similar journey to the past to kill two androids that would eradicate most of humanity in his own time; the script for Sonic the Hedgehog (2006) flat-out states "Essentially, think Trunks from Dragon Ball Z."

Since his first appearance in Sonic the Hedgehog (2006), he has mainly appeared in the Sonic series' spinoffs, multiplayer games, and small cameo roles. He is one of the playable characters in Sonic Rivals and Sonic Rivals 2, a playable character strictly in the multiplayer modes in Sonic and the Secret Rings and Sonic and the Black Knight, a playable racer in Sonic Riders: Zero Gravity, Sonic Free Riders and Team Sonic Racing, and a playable athlete in the Mario & Sonic series beginning with Mario & Sonic at the Olympic Winter Games. He appears in Sonic Generations as a sub-boss in the stages Crisis City (console version) and Tropical Resort (3DS version). Additionally, Silver was one of a few Sega characters to make a cameo in Super Smash Bros. Brawl, in the background of Sonic's Green Hill Zone stage, and as a trophy and sticker.

Silver has been positively received by fans, ranking as the third most popular Sonic character in a Japanese poll conducted by Dengeki Online in 2025.

=== Orbot and Cubot ===
Voiced by:

English: Chris Collet (SA-55, Sonic Unleashed), Kirk Thornton (Orbot), Wally Wingert (Cubot), Deven Mack (both, Sonic Prime)
Japanese: Mitsuo Iwata (Orbot), Wataru Takagi (Cubot)

Orbot (Note: Japanese: オーボット, Hepburn: Ōbotto) (/ˈɔːrbɒt/) is a red robotic assistant of Dr. Eggman. He generally assists in monitoring Eggman's data and facilitating his schemes, though he can be lazy and often makes sarcastic remarks pointing out general flaws in Eggman's plans. While an earlier version of the character appears in Sonic Unleashed under the name "SA-55" (a play on the word "sass"), he appears with his finalized name and design beginning in Sonic Colors, alongside a similar yellow robot named Cubot (Note: Japanese: キューボット, Hepburn: Kyūbotto) (/ˈkjuːbɒt/). Conversely to the intelligent Orbot, Cubot is rather slow, not witty, and frequently makes mistakes. He suffers from a defect in Sonic Colors that causes him to randomly speak with different accents. The two have continued to appear as assistants to Dr. Eggman in subsequent titles, such as Sonic Generations, Sonic Lost World and Sonic Forces. The duo made a cameo in Mario & Sonic at the London 2012 Olympic Games as one of the helping characters in the London Party, copying stickers for the participants. The duo appeared in Mario & Sonic at the Sochi 2014 Olympic Winter Games as the hosts of the Action and Answer Tour and in the Sonic Boom animated series. Digital Spy praised their inclusion in the plot of Sonic Colors, especially Cubot for his humorous observations and self-awareness about the game's tropes.

=== Wisps ===
Voiced by: Utako Yoshino

Wisps (Note: Japanese: ウィスプ, Hepburn: wisupu) are a race of extraterrestrial creatures who live on the grassy, lush planet called Planet Wisp. The mother of all Wisps is a much larger, pink one named Mother Wisp. She created Planet Wisp and raised all of her children. Wisps speak a common language that Sonic and Tails cannot understand, though Tails builds a translation device in the game Sonic Colors. Their Japanese and English name comes from Tails' translation of a word in their language; other characters in the game refer to them as "aliens". Wisps are composed of an energy force called "Hyper-go-ons", which they can use to phase into the body of playable protagonist Sonic and give him temporary elemental powers. They come in numerous breeds, each carrying one of many elemental powers known as "Color Powers". When Sonic collects a Wisp, he can use its power once at will; however, he can only carry one at a time.

There are numerous types of Wisps, each with its own special ability. Colors introduced ten types between the Wii and Nintendo DS versions of the game; some only appear in one version. For example, Purple Wisps, whose "Frenzy" ability turns Sonic into a difficult-to-control demon that can chomp through obstacles, is exclusive to the Wii version, but Violet Wisps, which scale up Sonic's density to black hole-like levels and causes him to absorb enemies, obstacles, and rings, appear only in the DS version.

However, others appear in both versions, such as Yellow Wisps, which allow Sonic to drill underground and find otherwise inaccessible areas. Sonic Lost World introduced more types of Wisps while keeping some old types. Among these are Magenta Wisps, which bounce Sonic across paths of musical notes by having the player tap them on the Wii U's touch screen, and Black Wisps, which turn Sonic into a bomb that can roll over enemies and explode. The Colors manual describes each type of Wisp as having a different general personality; for example, Cyan Wisps, which allow Sonic to bounce off surfaces, are scatterbrained and energetic, while Orange Wisps, which blast him rapidly into the air, have fluctuating and explosive emotions.

In Sonic Colors, Eggman builds an amusement park spanning the Wisps' planets under the pretense of making up for past transgressions. Suspicious, Sonic and Tails investigate and rescue two Wisps from Orbot and Cubot. One of them, a talkative male White Wisp named Yacker, tags along with Sonic and Tails during the game. It turns out that Eggman is converting Wisps to a corrupted, purple (Wii version) or violet (DS version) state to fuel a mind control ray and control the universe. Sonic frees Wisps from their confines in each level, then uses several of them to defeat Eggman at the end of the game.

However, Eggman's mind control cannon malfunctions and creates a black hole, which sucks Sonic in until the Wisps combine their power to pull him out and neutralize the black hole. Yacker frees the remaining Wisps, reverts them from their corrupted form, thanks Sonic and Tails, and leaves. The DS version features Mother Wisp as a post-game boss, as she was corrupted by the corrupted Wisps' Hyper-go-ons. Wisps have also appeared in the level "Planet Wisp" in Sonic Generations and the comics. Iizuka stated in an interview that the Wisps were added to Colors to "expand and strengthen the platform action gameplay" without forcing the player to switch to other playable characters. Another goal was to encourage players to revisit already-played levels; Sonic Team accomplished this by adding segments requiring certain types of Wisps to levels preceding their first appearances. Iizuka has said that he now considers them a staple in the Sonic series.

Critics have given mixed opinions toward Wisps and their integration into Sonic gameplay. IGN's Arthur Gies called them "the big addition" to Sonic Colors, outshining its polished physics and controls. Dave McComb of film magazine Empire called them "cutesy" and "strange", while John Meyer of Wired found them "cuddly" and Dale North of Destructoid called them "a cute little alien race". Randy Nelson from Joystiq called them "plush" and speculated that they could easily lend their image to profitable merchandise.

Positive attention has been directed at the variety of Wisps available in Sonic Colors and Lost World and at the variety of gameplay styles they brought to the titles: for example, Gies stated that "almost all of them add interesting quirks to Sonic's basic abilities." Reviewing the Nintendo DS version of Colors, Tim Turi from Game Informer stated that "each adds an interesting new gameplay mechanic" to the game. Gies and Turi also praised the ability to revisit old levels with Wisps unlocked afterwards. Nintendo Power's Steve Thomason identified them as "a truly interesting addition to the Sonic formula" amidst a series of missteps, and praised their "cleverly designed" variety. Computer and Video Games writer Chris Scullion described Wisps in Lost World as "familiar power-ups that emulate mechanics in Mario's Wii adventures" as part of a larger, ambivalent point about the game being derivative of Super Mario Galaxy.

However, control and pacing aspects of the Wisps in general, as well as of individual types, have been criticized: for example, Turi opined that "for almost every useful ability there is a complete dud" and bemoaned the Wii controls. Justin Speer from GameTrailers thought similarly and added that the Wisps "don't really feel like they belong". Hardcore Gamer Magazine's review of Lost World stated that none of the Wisps make satisfying use of the Wii U's gamepad. Chris Shilling of Eurogamer found them to "lead to clumsy touchscreen or gyro interludes that kill a level's pacing."

=== Deadly Six ===
Voiced by:

English: Travis Willingham (Zavok (2013–2017)), Patrick Seitz (Zomom, Zavok (2019–present)), Liam O'Brien (Zazz (2013–2020)), Robbie Rist (Zazz (2025)), Kirk Thornton (Master Zik), Stephanie Sheh (Zeena), Sam Riegel (Zor)
Japanese: Joji Nakata (Zavok), Yutaka Aoyama (Zazz), Chafurin (Zomom), Mugihito (Master Zik), Yumi Toma (Zeena), Yuki Tai (Zor)

The Deadly Six (Note: 六鬼衆, Rokkishū; lit. "Six Demons") are a group of six Zeti, a species that has the ability to manipulate magnetic fields. Their exact origins are unknown, but prior to the events of Sonic Lost World, Dr. Eggman takes control of the group in order to capture animals to create Badniks. He controls them and their powers with an item known as the Cacophonic Conch, which causes them great pain when he blows into it. However, when Sonic kicks the Conch away from Eggman, they use their powers to control Eggman's Badniks, which prompted Sonic and Tails to reluctantly team up with Eggman to get past the Zeti and stop them. After turning on Eggman, they use his machine which was designed to extract the life out of the Earth and give it to themselves, making them stronger. While Sonic Lost World is the only game to feature all six members, individual members of the group have reappeared in subsequent games such as Sonic Forces: Speed Battle, the Mario & Sonic series, and Sonic Racing: CrossWorlds.

The members of the Deadly Six are Zavok, (Note: ザボック, Zabokku) a muscular, red-colored Zeti who acts as the group's leader; Zazz, (Note: ザズ, Zazu) a lanky, pink-colored Zeti who is always ready for a fight; Zomom, (Note: ゾモン, Zomon) a gluttonous and dimwitted yellow-colored Zeti who is always seen eating; Master Zik, (Note: マスタージーク, Masutā Jīku) an elderly, blue-colored Zeti, the founder of the Deadly Six, and Zavok's mentor who is skillful in martial arts; Zeena, (Note: ジーナ, Jīna) a vain, green-colored female Zeti; and Zor, (Note: ゾア, Zoa) a nihilistic, purple-colored Zeti who is always seen holding a blue rose.

=== Sage ===
Voiced by:

English: Ryan Bartley
Japanese: Megumi Hayashibara

Sage (Note: Japanese: セージ, Hepburn: Sēji) is an artificial intelligence created by Doctor Eggman that resembles a young white haired girl. She was introduced in Sonic Frontiers, in which Eggman uses her to investigate the ruins of the Ancients, an alien race that brought the Chaos Emeralds to Earth. Upon learning the portal could release the End, a malevolent entity sealed by the Ancients, Sage traps Eggman in Cyber Space for his protection. As the End manipulates Sonic into aiding in its release, Sage opposes him with the Ancients' robotic weapons. Though she treats Sonic coldly at first due to her programming by Eggman, she gradually develops a respect for him. Similarly, Eggman begins to see Sage as more than an artificial being over time, coming to regard her as his daughter. In the game's default ending, Sage sacrifices herself to help Sonic defeat the End, but is revived by Eggman using the Ancients' technology; in the "Final Horizon" update, she survives altogether.

Following the release of Frontiers, Sage made a cameo appearance in The Murder of Sonic the Hedgehog and appears as a playable character in Sonic Racing: CrossWorlds. Sage also appears in the audio drama series Sonic the Hedgehog Presents: The Chaotix Casefiles.

== Characters in other media ==
=== Sally Acorn ===
Sally Acorn (voiced by Kath Soucie) is a red-haired brown chipmunk who appears as a major character in the 1993 Sonic the Hedgehog animated series and later in the Archie Comics series. She has also made minor cameos in the Sonic Spinball game and in the Adventures of Sonic the Hedgehog animated series. In the animated series for which the character was created and also in the Archie Comics series, she was depicted as a princess and leader of a group of freedom fighters, whose goal is to restore peace to the Kingdom of Acorn taken over by Robotnik. Sally is known for being Sonic's childhood friend and love interest, with Sally fighting alongside Sonic in many cases.

=== Scratch, Grounder, and Coconuts ===
Scratch, Grounder, and Coconuts (voiced by Phil Hayes, Garry Chalk, and Ian James Corlett respectively) are recurring dimwitted Badniks created by Doctor Robotnik in the Adventures of Sonic the Hedgehog series. The arrogant, chicken-like Scratch and the idiotic, mole-type Grounder are part of an organization formed by Robotnik named the "Super Special Sonic Search and Smash Squad", which aims to capture and exterminate Sonic; their infighting over who will be the one to take him down often leads them to ruin at the hands of the hedgehog, who takes advantage of their pride to defeat them. Sometimes accompanying them is Coconuts, a cynical, monkey-like Badnik who has been demoted to Robotnik's janitor and aims to prove himself as his greatest creation; Coconuts' efforts to one-up Scratch and Grounder are ultimately fruitless. Both Grounder and Coconuts are directly based on Badniks from Sonic the Hedgehog 2, while Scratch is loosely based on the Clucker enemy from the same game.

Scratch, Grounder, and Coconuts have received mixed reception; while the Adventures of Sonic the Hedgehog series proved polarizing to critics, the Badniks themselves have gone on to earn a cult following. The trio also make appearances in Sonic Spinball, the Sonic the Hedgehog comic series by Archie, and the Adventures-based game Dr. Robotnik's Mean Bean Machine for the Sega Genesis/Mega Drive and Game Gear, where they serve as bosses for the player to fight against.

=== Honey the Cat ===
Honey the Cat (Note: Japanese: ハニー・ザ・キャット, Hepburn: Hanī Za Kyatto) is an orange cat wearing a red dress with wings. She is a fashion designer who promotes her clothing by entering fighting tournaments. She is based on the character of the same name from Sega's 1995 arcade fighting game Fighting Vipers, and was created for inclusion in 1996's Sonic the Fighters. While she did not appear in the finished game, remnants of the character were later found in the game's code by hackers. Staff at Sega later rediscovered the character and, upon discovering her popularity with Western fans, implemented her as a secret character in the game's 2012 console port. This reintroduction led to the character making subsequent appearances in Archie Comics' and IDW Publishing's Sonic comics.

=== Chris Thorndyke ===
Christopher Thorndyke (Note: Japanese: クリストファー・ソーンダイク, Hepburn: Kurisutofā Sōndaiku) (voiced by Sanae Kobayashi in Japanese and Suzanne Goldish in English), usually called Chris, (Note: Japanese: クリス, Hepburn: Kurisu) is the main human protagonist of the Sonic X animated series. He encounters and befriends Sonic shortly after his arrival in Chris' world and invites him and his friends to stay in his home, joining them on their adventures to find the Chaos Emeralds and stop Eggman's robots.

The character has been divisive among fans. Writing for THEM Anime Reviews, Tim Jones called Chris an "uninspired" and "bland" protagonist.

=== Sticks the Badger ===
Sticks the Badger (Note: Japanese: スティックス・ザ・バジャー, Hepburn: Sutikkusu Za Bajā) (voiced by Nika Futterman in English and Aoi Yuki in Japanese) is an orange and brown badger, first introduced in the animated Sonic Boom television series. She is recognizable by her wild behavior and paranoia, having lived in the wilderness alone for most of her life. Nonetheless, she is portrayed as wanting to strengthen her newfound friendship with Sonic, Amy, Tails and Knuckles. She fights with wooden weaponry, mostly boomerangs, and has developed impressive athletic abilities due to living in the wild.

Sticks appears in all of the Sonic Boom video games, appearing in a non-playable role in Rise of Lyric and as a playable character in Shattered Crystal, Fire & Ice, and Sonic Dash 2.

Sticks has also appeared in Archie's short-lived Sonic Boom comics series, as well as the Worlds Unite event, the 2nd Archie comics crossover between Sonic the Hedgehog and Mega Man.

She is described as "infantile" by Scott Thompson of IGN and an "unlikeable idiot" by Becky Cunningham of GamesRadar, albeit a "nice addition" by Chris Carter of Destructoid.

Sticks has appeared in other Sonic titles not associated with the Boom sub-series, such as Sonic Runners and Mario & Sonic at the Rio 2016 Olympic Games. She is first mentioned in the main series in Sonic Frontiers, where she is depicted as a close friend of Amy Rose.

=== Tangle the Lemur and Whisper the Wolf ===
Tangle the Lemur (Note: Japanese: タングル・ザ・リーマー, Hepburn: Tanguru za Rīmā) and Whisper the Wolf (Note: Japanese: ウィスパー・ザ・ウルフ, Hepburn: Wisupā za Urufu) (voiced by Ashlyn Madden and Anairis Quiñones respectively) are major characters in IDW Publishing's Sonic the Hedgehog comic series who would later appear in the mobile games Sonic Forces: Speed Battle and Sonic Rumble, before joining Sonic Racing: CrossWorlds as free DLC characters. They would also make recurring appearances within the audio drama series Sonic the Hedgehog Presents: The Chaotix Casefiles. Prior to Sonic Racing: CrossWorlds, Tangle was previously mentioned in Sonic Frontiers, which confirmed the canonicity of the comic series within the mainline games.

Tangle is a grey and white ring-tailed lemur who can use her large elastic prehensile tail as an additional limb. She first appeared in IDW's Sonic the Hedgehog #4 and is often a source of comic relief. Whisper is a blonde wolf with a white and brown face who wields a unique multi-mode Wispon, a type of weapon introduced in Sonic Forces that utilizes the power of Wisps. First appearing in IDW's Sonic the Hedgehog #8, she suffers from PTSD due to a past tragedy, and is thus shy and reserved in contrast to Tangle's high-energy and optimism.

Reception to both characters has been highly positive. Fans who ship the two together have speculated that they are romantically attracted to each other, a theory unconfirmed by Sega but supported by the comics' staff. They received their own four-issue miniseries, IDW's Tangle & Whisper, in 2019, and merchandise of them has since been released as well.

=== Tom and Maddie Wachowski ===
Thomas Michael "Tom" Wachowski (/wəˈkaʊski/) (portrayed by James Marsden) and his wife Madeleine "Maddie" (portrayed by Tika Sumpter) are the two main human protagonists in the live-action Sonic film series by Paramount Pictures and its spin-offs.

Tom is the sheriff of Green Hills, Montana, while Maddie is the local veterinarian. The two were first introduced in Sonic the Hedgehog, where they become adoptive parents to Sonic and aid him in his quest to stop Robotnik. They subsequently appear in the second and third film, taking on similar parental roles for Tails and Knuckles. Both also made appearances in the spin-off IDW Publishing Sonic the Hedgehog 2: The Official Movie Pre-Quill comic, while Maddie appears in the first episode of the live-action spin-off show, Knuckles. Tom was also a playable skin in the Sonic the Hedgehog Minecraft DLC, with Maddie making a cameo appearance. Both also made appearances in the promotional Sega Genesis game cartridge for Sonic the Hedgehog 3 in the 'Characters' section.

=== Agent Stone ===
Agent Stone (portrayed by Lee Majdoub) is a secondary human antagonist featured in the live-action Sonic film series by Paramount Pictures.

Stone is depicted as an assistant and sidekick to Dr. Ivo Robotnik. In the first film's script, Stone was initially written as a minor character for Robotnik to talk to in order to further exposition within the story, but actor Jim Carrey's improvisation on set prompted Majdoub to portray the character as a sycophantic subordinate to Robotnik. Stone reappears in the second film, where he is shown running the Mean Bean Coffee Café in Green Hills prior to Robotnik's return to Earth and later helps the Doctor control the Giant Eggman Robot during the final battle, and also returns in the third film with a larger role, shown to have been looking after Robotnik during the time between the two films. Stone also appears in the spin-off Sonic the Hedgehog 2: The Official Movie Pre-Quill comic, and in the promotional SEGA Genesis game cartridge for Sonic the Hedgehog 3 in the 'Characters' section.

Agent Stone has been well received by the Sonic fandom, who have frequently depicted him in fan art and fan fiction, often while shipping him with Robotnik. Majdoub has positively acknowledged the fandom response to the character, as have franchise writers Pat Casey and Josh Miller, who expanded Stone's role in subsequent films as a result of the character's positive audience reception.
