= Sonic Rush =

2005 video game

- North American box art
- Developers: Dimps; Sonic Team
- Publisher: Sega
- Director: Akinori Nishiyama
- Producers: Yuji Naka; Kouichi Sakita
- Designers: Yukihiro Higashi; Takayuki Sakamoto; Masaaki Yamagiwa
- Programmers: Katsuya Kuramoto; Takaya Yamane; Shinichi Manabe
- Artists: Yuji Uekawa; Kazuhiko Yamamoto
- Composers: Hideki Naganuma; Teruhiko Nakagawa
- Series: Sonic the Hedgehog
- Platform: Nintendo DS
- Release: NA: November 15, 2005; PAL: November 18, 2005; JP: November 23, 2005
- Genre: Platform
- Modes: Single-player, multiplayer

Sonic Rush (Note: Japanese: ソニック・ラッシュ, Hepburn: Sonikku Rasshu) is a 2005 platform game developed by Sonic Team and Dimps for the Nintendo DS as part of Sega's Sonic the Hedgehog series. It was released on November 15, 2005, in North America, November 18 in the PAL region, and November 23 in Japan, and was the final game in the mainline Sonic series to be produced by Yuji Naka before his departure from Sega. It is a follow-up to the Sonic Advance trilogy and was the first Sonic game with the English 4Kids cast from Sonic X (2003-2005) instead of the cast first seen in Sonic Adventure (1998). It is a 2D platformer game with side-scrolling levels displayed on both the top and bottom screens of the DS. However, boss battles, the main characters, and a special stage are rendered in 3D, creating a 2.5D effect. The game's storyline follows the intertwining adventures of the series' main character, Sonic the Hedgehog and a new character, Blaze the Cat. They respectively battle Doctor Eggman and his doppelgänger Eggman Nega at certain points.

The game was announced under the working title Sonic DS at Electronic Entertainment Expo (E3) 2004, and under Sonic Rush at E3 2005. The game's 2.5D format was based on Sonic Team's idea to combine elements from 2D and 3D games in the series. Upon release, Sonic Rush was well received by critics, with praise stemming from the game's visuals, music, and similarity to older games in the series and criticism stemming from its overall quickness. A sequel, Sonic Rush Adventure, was released in 2007.

== Gameplay ==
Blaze runs through a loop in an early level of the game, demonstrating the dual-screen feature.

Sonic Rush is a 2D platform game, similar to earlier games in the series like Sonic Advance as well as later ones like Sonic Mania. The player controls either Sonic the Hedgehog or Blaze the Cat, who differ in terms of special abilities. In the tradition of past Sonic games, gameplay consists of moving quickly through levels, collecting rings and defeating enemies. The player collects rings as a form of health; when they are hit by an enemy or harmful obstacle, their rings bounce in all directions and can be recollected. The player begins the game with three lives, one of which is lost when the character is hit without any rings in their possession, crushed, drowns, falls into a bottomless pit, or reaches the act's 10-minute limit; losing all lives results in a game over. Both of the DS's screens are used to display the play area, with the player's character moving between them as necessary. Levels in the game are divided into "zones", each consisting of two acts of normal gameplay then a 3D boss battle. The course of the game differs depending on whether Sonic or Blaze is chosen; the seven zones are the same, but are accessed in different orders. During boss battles, Blaze fights Doctor Eggman and Sonic fights an Eggman doppelgänger called Eggman Nega. As the characters' stories progress, they meet each other several times and unite in the final zone that comes after the seventh. The game features special stages the player can access via certain handles in order to obtain the Chaos Emeralds. These Special Stages resemble those of Sonic the Hedgehog 2 and use the DS's stylus controls.

New features include a grading system that grades the player based on the time it takes for them to complete the level; they can return to levels later to try for a higher grade. There is a point system based on the one in Sonic Advance 2 but displaying points in multiple categories. Sonic Rush introduces a "Tension Gauge" on the left side of the screen which is filled by doing tricks and defeating enemies. The energy it generates gives the player the ability to use boosts of speed while moving, allowing them to advance through the level more quickly, which results in more points and a higher grade, as well as to access special stages when playing as Sonic. Although the game is primarily two-dimensional, there are three-dimensional elements which create a 2.5D effect.

The game has a two-player mode in which Sonic and Blaze race to the end of a chosen level from the game. There is also a feature in which players who own the game can send a demo of the game to other Nintendo DS users.

== Plot ==
Sonic fights one of the game's bosses, the Egg Scarab. Boss battles are rendered in 3D.

Blaze the Cat is somehow pulled from her native dimension into Sonic's world. Her world had seven Sol Emeralds—similar to the Chaos Emeralds—but they were stolen by Doctor Eggman. She then makes it her goal to retrieve them. While searching, she meets Cream the Rabbit and is surprised by her politeness. Meanwhile, Sonic is searching for the Chaos Emeralds, which have been stolen by Doctor Eggman Nega, Eggman's alternate counterpart from Blaze's dimension.

Sonic briefly encounters Blaze during his search, but she departs before he can question her. His friend Tails learns that the two dimensions are merging somehow, and both will collapse if the process is not stopped. Suspicious of Blaze, Sonic and Tails begin searching for her. Upon finding Blaze and Cream, Sonic questions Blaze about her nature, but she refuses to give any information and leaves with Cream. Sonic follows her to Eggman Nega's base, where it is revealed that Eggman and Eggman Nega are working together to collect both the Chaos Emeralds and the Sol Emeralds. Blaze declares that she is the only one who can save their worlds, without anyone's help. Sonic and Blaze fight each other, until Sonic wins the fight and Blaze realizes the error of her ways.

After Eggman kidnaps Cream, Blaze goes after him while Sonic takes on Nega. Sonic collects the last of the seven Chaos Emeralds and catches up with Blaze, who fails to prevent Eggman and Eggman Nega from draining the Sol Emeralds's power for their Egg Salamander mech. As the world begins to destabilize, Sonic and his friends help Blaze realize the meaning of friendship. This restores the Sol Emeralds, and Sonic and Blaze use both sets of Emeralds to transform into Super Sonic and Burning Blaze. The two destroy the Egg Salamander, restoring the dimensions to normal, and Blaze returns to her world, now better understanding her powers. Cream is saddened by Blaze's departure, but Sonic assures her that Blaze promised to return someday.

== Development ==
Sonic Rush was developed by Sonic Team and Dimps, and published by Sega. Yuji Naka, Sega's executive managing director, announced the game at Electronic Entertainment Expo (E3) 2004, along with Project Rub. A demo of the newly titled Sonic Rush was featured at E3 2005, and won video game publication IGN's "Biggest Surprise" award. Blaze the Cat, a new character, was revealed at Tokyo Game Show (TGS) 2005. The game's 2.5D format was based on Sonic Team's idea to combine elements from 2D and 3D games in the series. Director Akinori Nishiyama stated in a September 2005 interview with GameSpot that Sonic Team "wanted to keep the elements from 2D, yet still explore some of the new elements from 3D." At TGS 2005, he stated that while working on Sonic Advance 3, he realized that the series was becoming more complicated, opting for a "fast, dynamic action" approach to the next title in the series.

The music was primarily composed by Hideki Naganuma of Jet Set Radio fame. Additional music was composed by the game's sound director Teruhiko Nakagawa, along with Masayoshi Ishi and Hiroyuki Hamada of T's Music. Composing the music was a challenge for Naganuma, who had to work under the limitations of the Nintendo DS' sound chip. The final boss music in the soundtrack, "Wrapped in Black," used audible excerpts from Malcom X's "Message to the Grass Roots" speech.

Sonic Rush introduced Blaze, who has become a recurring character in the series. Blaze appeared for the second time in Sonic the Hedgehog in 2006, and then in Sonic Rush Adventure, the sequel to Sonic Rush, and numerous other games.

== Reception ==
Reception

Aggregate scores
Aggregator	Score
GameRankings	83.23%
Metacritic	82/100

Review scores
Publication	Score
1Up.com	B+
GamePro	3.5/5
GameSpot	8.2/10
GameSpy	3.5/5
IGN	9/10
Nintendo Power	9/10

Sonic Rush was released on November 15, 2005, in North America; November 18 in Europe; and November 23 in Japan. It was the ninth best-selling DS game of December 2006. It sold 360,000 copies in Europe from March 2006 to March 2007. The game received a "Platinum" sales award from the Entertainment and Leisure Software Publishers Association (ELSPA), indicating sales of at least 300,000 copies in the United Kingdom.

The game was released to "generally favorable" reviews, according to video game review aggregator Metacritic. Critics praised the game for its usage of elements from older Sonic games. GameSpot, IGN, and Nintendo Power compared the game to older games in the series, specifically those on the Sega Genesis. GameSpy staff writer Greg Sewart offered a similar opinion, also praising the game for its "gorgeous graphics". The visuals were well received, with some calling it "gorgeous" and "colourful". The game's overall quickness was not as well received. GameSpy's Greg Sewart, although giving a mostly positive review, complained that "it's so fast you almost can't tell what's going on most of the time." 1UP.com and GamePro thought similarly. The game's music was well-received, called "bright [and] buoyant" by 1UP.com and compared to that of Jet Set Radio by GameSpot. GameSpy called the music "all very fitting and very catchy", noting its use of sampling and unconventional structure.

In 2008, Sonic Rush was listed at #17 in IGN's list of the top 25 DS games. In 2009, it was listed as one of the "cheers" on IGN's "Cheers & Tears" list of action games for the DS.
