= Sonic Racing: CrossWorlds =

- Developer: Sonic Team
- Publisher: Sega
- Directors: Masaru Kohayakawa; Shingo Kawakami
- Producers: Takashi Iizuka; Ryuichi Taki
- Designers: Norio Ishii; Takamitsu Kobayashi; Ryo Tanabe; Toshifumi Hara
- Programmer: Shumpei Takeyama
- Artists: Yuji Yamaga; Takeshi Higuchi
- Writer: Ian Flynn
- Composer: Takahiro Kai (see below)
- Series: Sonic the Hedgehog
- Engine: Unreal Engine 5
- Platforms: Nintendo Switch; PlayStation 4; PlayStation 5; Windows; Xbox One; Xbox Series X/S; Nintendo Switch 2; Arcade
- Release: Nintendo Switch, PS4, PS5, Windows, Xbox One, Xbox Series X/S; September 25, 2025; Nintendo Switch 2; December 4, 2025; Arcade; TBA
- Genre: Kart racing
- Modes: Single-player, multiplayer

Sonic Racing: CrossWorlds (Note: Japanese: ソニックレーシングクロスワールド, Hepburn: Sonikku Rēshingu Kurosu Wārudo) is a 2025 kart racing game developed by Sonic Team and published by Sega. A spinoff in the Sonic the Hedgehog series, it incorporates characters and features from previous Sonic racing games. The game's main new feature is the "CrossWorld" mechanic, which causes racers to travel to other tracks in the middle of a race. Several guest characters from other franchises appear via free and paid downloadable content.

Sonic Racing: CrossWorlds was developed by Sonic Team, with members of the Initial D arcade games' development team contributing. The game was released for Nintendo Switch, PlayStation 4, PlayStation 5, Windows, Xbox One, and Xbox Series X/S on September 25, 2025. A Nintendo Switch 2 version followed on December 4, 2025, and an arcade version is in development. CrossWorlds received positive reviews from critics, who praised its gameplay and customization features, though its single-player content and downloadable characters' presentation were criticized.

== Gameplay ==
An example of gameplay in Sonic Racing: CrossWorlds. Players enter CrossWorlds through large Travel Rings that appear on the race track.

Sonic Racing: CrossWorlds is a kart racing game, similar to its predecessor, Team Sonic Racing (2019), although CrossWorlds does not retain that game's cooperative team racing mechanic in normal gameplay. Players race against up to 11 opponents in three-lap races around a track, similar to other games in the genre such as the Mario Kart series. Like previous Sonic racing games, a strong emphasis is placed on drifting to maneuver around tight turns and build up additional speed. Players can also earn speed boosts by performing consecutive mid-air tricks after jumping off ramps. Rings are scattered around the track, which players can gather to increase their maximum speed; players lose rings when they make contact with walls, obstacles, or other racers. Item capsules can also be obtained, which can be used to increase the player's speed or attack other opponents.

Players can choose between standard race cars, which transform to boats and planes at different points in the race similar to Sonic & All-Stars Racing Transformed (2012), or Extreme Gear hoverboards, which were previously featured in the Sonic Riders sub-series. Unlike previous Sonic racing games, characters are not restricted to a single vehicle and have their own stats, which affect the performance of vehicles. Cars fall into one of four different classes based on their most prominent stat: Speed, Acceleration, Power, or Handling. A fifth type, Boost, is utilized exclusively by Extreme Gear. A total of 45 different vehicles can be unlocked, with players also able to combine parts from the vehicles they have unlocked to create custom vehicles. By competing in races and completing special challenge objectives, players can earn "Donpa Tickets", which can be used to purchase additional vehicle parts and customization items like paint and decals. Tickets can also be spent to retry a race during a Grand Prix, or gifted to characters to increase their friendship rating and earn rewards. Before starting a race, players can choose from over 70 unlockable gadgets to equip that provide them passive advantages, such as drawing in distant rings, increasing trick speeds, or prioritizing specific items; up to six gadget slots can be unlocked, with some gadgets requiring multiple slots to be equipped. The Year 2 update added a seventh "super slot" that enhances the strength of the gadget equipped in it.

The game features 24 different race tracks, divided into eight Grands Prix. Many of the tracks are based on locations from previous Sonic games, such as Metal Harbor from Sonic Adventure 2 (2001) and Kronos Island from Sonic Frontiers (2022). After the first lap of each race, the leading racer chooses between two different "Travel Rings", large ring-shaped portals that appear in the middle of the track; the racers then enter the selected Travel Ring and emerge in the corresponding "CrossWorld", one of 15 separate locations in which the second lap of the race takes place before reverting to the original track for the final lap. While in the CrossWorld, random "frenzy" modifiers may be activated, causing additional effects such as adding moving boost gates to the course. Elements of the track layout also change during the final lap, adding new hazards or opening new paths and shortcuts. Additional tracks and vehicles are available as downloadable content (DLC).

Players can choose between four different speed options, which also act as the race's difficulty setting. In Grand Prix mode, the player must complete four sequential races, consisting of three standard races and a final race that features one lap each from the preceding tracks, while attempting to earn the highest placement score possible. During a Grand Prix, one opponent is designated as the player's "rival", who exhibits higher difficulty behavior and specifically targets the player during each race. Rival characters also have special interactions with the player character, and defeating a rival in Grand Prix grants additional rewards. A time trial mode allows players to play three laps on each track and record their best times. Earning medals in time trials unlocks additional music tracks from other Sonic games in the "jukebox" menu; these tracks can then be set as the individual background music for each lap of a race. A third mode, Race Park, features team mechanics similar to those in Team Sonic Racing. In the mode, teams of players earn points by completing specific challenges, such as collecting the most rings or hitting the most opponents with items. Defeating computer-controlled rival teams in Race Park unlocks additional rewards. As part of the Year 2 update, the game added a "Duel Match" mode, in which players compete in one-on-one races with their opponent's items and distance visible at all times. Additional rewards can be earned by defeating computer controlled rivals in duels. The game supports local multiplayer, as well as cross-platform online multiplayer for up to 12 players. Themed "festival" events are held infrequently, allowing players to compete online in Race Park style challenges to earn points for additional rewards.

=== Characters ===
CrossWorlds features the largest roster of playable characters in a Sonic racing game to date. The game launched with 24 playable characters, one of which is unlockable. Additional characters from Sonic and other Sega properties have been added via free monthly updates, with 13 total being added in the first year after release. (Note: Attributed to multiple sources:) A premium season pass adds 15 characters from other external properties, spread across six waves of downloadable content. A second year of content, including both paid and free characters, is currently ongoing. Super Shadow and three characters originating from the animated series Sonic Prime can only be obtained through season passes, while Sonic the Werehog from Sonic Unleashed was available as a pre-order incentive.

As of November 3, 2026, the game features 58 playable characters. Guest characters are labeled below in bold.

==== Base roster ====
- Amy
- Big
- Blaze
- Charmy
- Cream & Cheese
- Dr. Eggman
- Egg Pawn
- Espio
- Jet
- Knuckles
- Metal Sonic
- Omega
- Rouge
- Sage
- Shadow
- Silver
- Sonic
- Storm
- Super Sonic (Note: Playable only in Grand Prix mode)
- Tails
- Vector
- Wave
- Zavok
- Zazz

==== Free downloadable content ====
- **AiAi**
- **Aigis**
- **Amigo**
- **Arle**
- **Axel**
- **Bayonetta**
- Classic Sonic
- **Goro Majima**
- **Hatsune Miku**
- **Ichiban Kasuga**
- **Joker**
- **Nights**
- **Red**
- Tangle
- Whisper

==== Paid downloadable content ====
- **Aang**
- **Alex**
- **Asuka Shikinami Langley**
- **Creeper**
- **Donatello**
- Dread (Note: Only available with purchase of Season Pass One)
- **Ghosts** (Note: The four ghosts (Blinky, Inky, Pinky and Clyde) share a single character slot, acting as individually-selectable character skins.)
- **Hello Kitty**
- **Katara**
- **Kuromi**
- **Leonardo**
- **Mega Man**
- **Michelangelo**
- Nine
- **Pac-Man**
- **Patrick**
- **Proto Man**
- **Raphael**
- **Rei Ayanami**
- Rusty Rose
- **SpongeBob**
- **Steve**
- Super Shadow (Note: Only available with purchase of both Season Pass One and Season Pass Two)
- Werehog (Note: Pre-order bonus)

== Development ==
Sonic Team began developing Sonic Racing: CrossWorlds in 2022, with the developers behind the Initial D series of arcade racing games contributing to the project. Sonic Team chose to incorporate both transforming vehicles and Extreme Gear as a way of appealing to fans of previous Sonic racing games, treating CrossWorlds as a culmination of all the games to date. The Travel Ring concept was inspired by the use of rings as portals in the Sonic the Hedgehog film series, as well as producer Ryuichi Taki's childhood memories of driving through long tunnels and emerging in very different environments. The team's experience with developing arcade racing games inspired them to make each lap of the race unique to maintain excitement and interest. Taki noted that the Extreme Gear was difficult to implement, as it necessitated creating an entirely new gameplay system to make it work. The team worked to refine the core racing gameplay and course design before adding any items to the game, removing those which they felt made the gameplay too unbalanced. Creative director Masaru Kobayakawa drew on his experience developing arcade card games when balancing gadget combinations, feeling that a certain "sharpness" was needed to create opportunities for a more interesting metagame.

Sonic series producer Takashi Iizuka stated that while CrossWorlds was designed as a Sonic racing game first and foremost, fan disappointment at the lack of crossover content in Team Sonic Racing compared to previous entries led them to include more guest characters as DLC. Iizuka also stated that since the Sonic franchise has traditionally seen the most success in western markets, the team instead chose guest characters for downloadable content that would draw interest from Japanese players. The downloadable characters do not have voice acting, due to the lengthy approval process required when dealing with external licensors.

=== Music ===
Takahiro Kai acted as sound director and lead composer for CrossWorlds and composed the main theme, "Sonic Racing - Cross the Worlds", which features lyrics and vocals by James Bourne of Busted. The song "Get Higher" by Creepy Nuts appears in the credits. Other contributors to the soundtrack include Sega composers Tomoya Ohtani, Tae Fujimoto, Jun Senoue, Kanon Oguni, Iona Takashima, Satoshi Okamura, Hidekuni Horita, and Makoto Tokuyama, as well as guest musicians Riot, Giga, Tee Lopes, Zardonic, Camellia, Toriena, Nanobii, Aiobahn, and Laur. A set of five songs by Vocaloid musicians Kairiki Bear, cosMo@Bousou-P, Yunosuke, Ponchi♪, and Camellia are also featured, with accompanying art and music videos released as part of a "Project Onsoku" collaboration between Sonic and Hatsune Miku. Additional music tracks, including songs by Crazy Raccoon and Inugami Korone, have been added via free updates and paid downloadable content.

== Release ==
Sonic Racing: CrossWorlds was initially announced with a teaser trailer at The Game Awards 2024. The first gameplay trailer was shown during Sony Interactive Entertainment's State of Play on February 12, 2025, and a closed beta test for the PlayStation 5 version was held from February 21 to 23. This was followed by an open beta test for PlayStation 5, Xbox Series X/S, Nintendo Switch, and Windows between August 29 and September 1. A single-player demo was released on September 17.

In June 2025, leaked concept art and footage from an early build of the game revealed the existence of multiple guest characters from non-Sega franchises planned as downloadable content. The inclusion of guests was subsequently confirmed at Summer Game Fest a few days later on June 6, along with the final release date of September 25, 2025. Iizuka expressed disappointment in the leaks, feeling it had ruined the excitement and surprise for fans. A Nintendo Switch 2 version was also announced, and was released digitally on December 4, 2025, with a paid upgrade available for owners of the Nintendo Switch version that will carry over their progress. A physical Nintendo Switch 2 release followed on March 26, 2026.

In addition to the standard edition of the game, a Digital Deluxe Edition provided three days of early access on all non-Nintendo platforms. The Digital Deluxe Edition also includes the downloadable content season pass, the contents of which are being released in six waves over the course of the year following launch. Each wave of the pass adds multiple characters, a race track, a vehicle, emotes, and music based on a different franchise, including Minecraft, SpongeBob SquarePants, Pac-Man, Mega Man, Teenage Mutant Ninja Turtles: Mutant Mayhem, and Avatar Legends. (Note: Attributed to multiple sources:) Separate to the individual waves, the season pass also includes three characters from Sonic Prime. Sega Account holders could redeem a code for the "Blue Star" Extreme Gear in-game, which was later released as general DLC. Limited Run Games produced a Collector's Edition of the game packaged with additional physical rewards, which was only available to order during June 2025. A second year of DLC was announced at Summer Game Fest 2026, and once again features six content packs, including content based on Godzilla, Neon Genesis Evangelion, Sanrio, Final Fantasy VII Remake, and Persona. Vehicles based on Sega game consoles were included as a bonus with the second season pass, while Super Shadow is playable for those who purchase both season passes.

Sega held a World Championships tournament in October 2026, at which they announced the contents of the second season pass and the development of an arcade port, Sonic Racing: CrossWorlds Arcade DX.

=== Marketing ===
During 2025, Sega promoted the game through a "Racing Around the World" marketing campaign. In June, the company announced a multi-year partnership with the McLaren Formula One racing team. A McLaren themed vehicle and costume for Sonic was added to the game in a free update in November 2026. A tie-in one-shot manga, Sonic The Hedgehog — Blue Racer, was released for free via Sega's social media channels in July. A promotional short animated by Studio Giggex and SIMAGE Animation was released on August 29. CrossWorlds includes in-game vehicle decals promoting several other external brands, such as ASUS, Beyblade, and Hi-Chew. In October 2025, Sonic was added as an optional voice for the Waze GPS software, along with CrossWorlds themed icons. IDW Publishing, the publisher of the Sonic comic book series, also released a tie-in comic issue in March 2026.

An advertisement for CrossWorlds, titled "Come Race on Our Level", received attention for dimunitively comparing the game's dimension-hopping abilities and character customization to "[roaming] around on the open road" in "that kart racing game", heavily implied to be Mario Kart World, whose open world design received polarizing reception. The advertisement, which was based on a 1992 Sega Genesis TV commercial, drew comparisons to the Nintendo-Sega console wars in the 1990s.

== Reception ==
=== Pre-release ===
In a preview for IGN, Jada Griffin praised CrossWorlds for its breadth of customization options and the novelty of the CrossWorlds game mechanic. The closed beta was well received in reviews published in Digital Trends and ComicBook.com, as well as by fans online, with the presentation, gameplay, and variety of playable characters and tracks being praised, and the "chaotic" nature of the races being generally described as fun and entertaining. However, some also found the chaos overwhelming, and felt that the combat power-ups featured in the game were unbalanced, hoping that they might be adjusted in the final release. According to Taki, the balance of power-ups underwent heavy adjustment in response to feedback from the closed beta test.

=== Post-release ===
Reception

Aggregate scores
Aggregator	Score
Metacritic	82/100 (PS5) (Note: Based on 80 reviews); 88/100 (XSXS) (Note: Based on 5 reviews); 84/100 (PC) (Note: Based on 9 reviews); 86/100 (NS2) (Note: Based on 4 reviews); 76/100 (NS) (Note: Based on 4 reviews)
OpenCritic	95% recommend (Note: Based on 67 reviews)

Review scores
Publication	Score
Eurogamer	3/5
Famitsu	33/40
Game Informer	8.5/10
GameSpot	7/10
GamesRadar+	4/5
HobbyConsolas	80/100
IGN	9/10
Nintendo Life	7/10
Push Square	8/10
Shacknews	8/10
TechRadar	4.5/5
Video Games Chronicle	4/5

Sonic Racing: CrossWorlds received "generally favorable" reviews according to review aggregation website Metacritic. The game was recommended by 95% of critics according to aggregator OpenCritic. In Japan, four critics from Famitsu gave the game a total score of 33 out of 40. IGN praised the game for its fast and intuitive racing, and found that the game's rival system added a greater level of personality to the game. Game Informer described the game as "the most well-rounded kart racer of the year", though they criticized the game's Grand Prix mode for each cup's final race making the player replay previous courses. Anime News Network said that not only was the game the best racing game in the Sonic franchise, but probably one of the best racing games from the past decade.

Critics contrasted the game's traditional kart racing approach with the design reinventions of Mario Kart World. Chris Scullion from Video Games Chronicle wrote "By sticking with the tried-and-tested Grand Prix format and offering straightforward three-lap races, Sega's game is no longer a like-for-like take on Mario Kart but has now – whether deliberate or not – positioned itself as a viable alternative for those not interested in the new direction Nintendo’s series has taken." Steve Watts of GameSpot compared the two games, noting that while Mario Kart World "excelled due to its simplicity", Sonic Racing: CrossWorlds' customization offered enough depth to reward experimentation.

Push Square praised the game as a solid kart racer but criticized the game's progression features, describing the game's unlockable content as a grind. This criticism was echoed by GamesRadar+, who felt that replaying the game's Grand Prix mode became samey. The game's downloadable content has been met with criticism. Eurogamer expressed disappointment that the Sega-related crossover DLC fails to include courses based on the characters' respective franchises. Kotaku also criticized the lack of rival dialogue and general voice acting for the DLC characters compared to the base game characters, describing them as "mostly just props placed in karts or on hoverboards".

=== Sales ===
In Japan, Sonic Racing: CrossWorlds sold 5,500 physical copies in during its first week of release, debuting at 24th on the national sales chart between September 22 and September 28, 2025. The game sold an additional 1,776 physical copies the following week, again ranking 24th.

In the United States and Canada, Sonic Racing: CrossWorlds was the 16th most-downloaded PlayStation 5 title in September 2025. In the United States, the game ranked as the 8th best-selling title for the period from August 31 to October 4. The game placed 15th on the U.S. sales chart in October, and 13th in November.

In the United Kingdom, Sonic Racing: CrossWorlds debuted at 4th place on the physical sales chart for the week ending September 27, 2025. The game moved to 12th place the following week, then ranked 24th for the week ending October 11, and 31st for the week ending October 18. In subsequent weeks, the game placed 38th (week ending November 16), 22nd (November 23), 27th (November 30), 32nd (December 6), 27th (December 13), 23rd (December 20), 27th (December 27), and 36th for the week ending January 3, 2026.

By October 2025, Sonic Racing: CrossWorlds had surpassed one million copies sold worldwide. In November 2025, Sega stated in their financial report that the game's initial sales had failed to meet internal projections.

=== Accolades ===
Year	Award	Category	Result	Ref.
2025	Golden Joystick Awards	Console Game of the Year	Nominated	
2025	The Game Awards 2025	Best Family Game	Nominated	
2025	The Game Awards 2025	Best Sports / Racing Game	Nominated	
2026	15th New York Game Awards	Central Park Children’s Zoo Award for Best Kids Game	Nominated	
2026	53rd Annie Awards	Best Sponsored (for Sonic Racing: CrossWorlds - The Animation)	Nominated	
2026	22nd British Academy Games Awards	Family	Longlisted	
