= List of Sonic X episodes =

Episodes of Japanese anime series

Sonic X is an anime series based on the Sonic the Hedgehog video game series. It originally aired on Sundays from April 6, 2003 to March 28, 2004 with a total of 52 episodes, collectively known as "Series 1". In Japan, episodes 53–78 ("Series 2") initially went unaired on television, becoming direct-to-video releases, while episodes 53–78 were first broadcast on TV in France and parts of Asia before airing on UK/US television.

As part of Kids Station's 2020 programming lineup and as a tie-in promotion for the Sonic the Hedgehog film, the network broadcast the remaining episodes in 2020, marking the first time the episodes aired in any format on Japanese television.

For the English dub produced by 4Kids, which aired on Fox's Saturday morning block FoxBox, later renamed 4Kids TV, from August 23, 2003 to May 6, 2006, episodes 1–52 were referred to as Seasons 1–2, each 26 episodes long, and episodes 53–78 were referred to as Season 3. However, the Saga Set DVD releases split the episodes into 6 seasons, each containing 13 episodes. The airdates for TV Tokyo are listed on the left, while the airdates for the 4Kids English dub are on the right. For Season 3, air dates for the Japanese run reflect the first date of Kids Station's broadcasts.

== Series overview ==
The "seasons" that compromise the episode list correspond to the series' international release outside of Japan. In Japan, the first 52 episodes of Sonic X aired continuously year-round with regular preemptions in place for specials and sporting events, not split into standard seasonal cycles. The last 26 episodes were initially released internationally before coming to Japan as a Tokyo Movie Online-exclusive series prior to its 2020 rebroadcast on Kids Station.

Season	Episodes	Originally released	
Season	Episodes	First released	Last released
1	26	April 6, 2003	September 28, 2003
2	26	October 5, 2003	March 28, 2004
3	26	March 12, 2005	April 18, 2005

== Episode list ==
=== Season 1: The New World and Chaos Emerald Sagas (2003) ===
No.	Title	Directed by	Written by	Storyboarded by	Original release date	American air date
1	"The Supersonic Hero Takes the Stage!" ("Chaos Control Freaks"); Transliteration: "Chōonsoku hīrō tōjō!" (Japanese: 超音速ヒーロー登場！)	Hajime Kamegaki	Hiro Masaki	Hajime Kamegaki	April 6, 2003	August 23, 2003 (sneak peek) (Note: On August 23, 2003, 4Kids Entertainment ran a sneak peek of the series on Fox Box, prior to the proper premiere of the series on September 6, 2003, two weeks later.) September 6, 2003 (series premiere)
In a battle, Sonic the Hedgehog (Note: Voiced by Jun'ichi Kanemaru in Japanese and Jason Griffith in English.) destroys Doctor "Eggman" Robotnik's (Note: Voiced by Chikao Ohtsuka in Japanese and Mike Pollock in English.) Energy Amplifier, powered by the seven Chaos Emeralds. This causes an explosion, a result of a phenomenon known as Chaos Control, which sends Sonic, Eggman and his fortress, Miles "Tails" Prower (Note: Voiced by Ryō Hirohashi in Japanese and Amy Palant in English.) and his biplane, the Tornado 2 (Tornado), Knuckles the Echidna, (Note: Voiced by Nobutoshi Canna in Japanese and Dan Green in English.) Amy Rose, (Note: Voiced by Taeko Kawata in Japanese and Lisa Ortiz in English.) Cream the Rabbit (Note: Voiced by Sayaka Aoki in Japanese and Rebecca Honig in English.) and her pet Chao Cheese, (Note: Voiced by Etsuko Kozakura in Japanese and Rebecca Honig in English.) and Rouge the Bat to Station Square, a city on Earth. The police deploy the Speed Team, led by Formula One car driver Sam Speed, (Note: Voiced by Sōichirō Tanaka in Japanese and Greg Abbey in English.) to capture Sonic, but he outruns them and escapes. However, he falls off the road and into the pool of a mansion; as he cannot swim, he is saved by Chris Thorndyke, (Note: Voiced by Sanae Kobayashi in Japanese and Suzanne Goldish in English.) a young boy who lives there.
2	"Infiltrate Area 99!" ("Sonic to the Rescue"); Transliteration: "Sennyū! Eria 99" (Japanese: 潜入！エリア99)	Keiichirō Furuya	Hiro Masaki	Kazuhide Tomonaga	April 13, 2003	September 13, 2003
Sonic meets Chris' inventor grandfather, Chuck. (Note: Voiced by Bin Shimada in Japanese and T. R. Shields in English.) After learning that Cream and Cheese are being held at Area 99, a military research base, Chris and Chuck help Sonic free them, and they reunite with Tails and the Tornado. Meanwhile, Eggman, whose fortress has been sent to a deserted island, schemes to establish an "Eggman Empire" on Earth.
3	"Dr. Eggman's Ambition" ("Missile Wrist Rampage"); Transliteration: "Dr. Eggman no yabō" (Japanese: Dr．エッグマンの野望)	Keiko Oyamada	Hiro Masaki	Toshihiko Masuda	April 20, 2003	September 20, 2003
Eggman deploys his robot E-23 Missile Wrist in an attempt to take over Station Square, but Sonic defeats him with Knuckles and Amy's help. The police attempt to capture them, but they escape, with Amy returning to the Thorndyke mansion with Sonic and co. and Knuckles leaving to be on his own.
4	"Get the Chaos Emerald!" ("Chaos Emerald Chaos"); Transliteration: "Kaosu Emerarudo o te ni irero!" (Japanese: カオスエメラルドを手に入れろ！)	Masafumi Satō	Hiro Masaki	Kazuyoshi Yokota	April 27, 2003	September 27, 2003
The President (Note: Voiced by Tomohisa Asō in Japanese and Ted Lewis in English.) and the government begin spying operations on Eggman, installing an agent, Mr. Stewart, (Note: Voiced by Michio Nakao in Japanese and Andrew Rannells in English.) as Chris' elementary school teacher to keep tabs on him. The heroes theorize that if they gather the seven Chaos Emeralds, they can send Sonic and the others back to their world. The green Emerald is discovered at a construction site and Eggman and Chris fight over it, with Chris successfully recovering the Emerald.
5	"Clash!! Sonic vs. Knuckles" ("Cracking Knuckles"); Transliteration: "Gekitotsu!! Sonikku vs Nakkuruzu" (Japanese: 激突！！ソニックvsナックルズ)	Keiichirō Furuya	Kiyoko Yoshimura	Kazuhide Tomonaga	May 4, 2003	October 4, 2003
Eggman falsely tells Knuckles, who seeks to return home so he can resume his duty of guarding the Master Emerald, that Sonic intentionally caused Chaos Control and is undermining Eggman's efforts to go home so he can live out the rest of his life peacefully. Enraged, Knuckles challenges Sonic to a fight, which Eggman uses as a distraction to capture Chris, Amy, and Tails, and Knuckles helps Sonic defeat Eggman after realizing that he fell for a ruse.
6	"Fierce Battle! School Wars" ("Techno-Teacher"); Transliteration: "Nessen! Sukūru wōzu" (Japanese: 熱戦！スクール・ウォーズ)	Naoyuki Kuzuya	Yoshio Urasawa	Kōji Hōri	May 11, 2003	October 11, 2003
Eggman sends E-51 Intelligente, (Note: Voiced by Tomohisa Asō in Japanese and Andrew Rannells in English.) a teacher robot, to indoctrinate Chris' class, but Sonic thwarts his plan. Chris' parents—Nelson, (Note: Voiced by Ken Yamaguchi in Japanese and Ted Lewis in English.) a wealthy company president, and Lindsey, (Note: Voiced by Naomi Shindō in Japanese and Veronica Taylor in English.) a famous actress—return home after a long absence.
7	"Giant Free-For-All! Chris' House Party" ("Party Hardly"); Transliteration: "Daikonsen! Kurisu no hōmu pāti" (Japanese: 大混戦！クリスのホームパーティ)	Keiko Oyamada	Chinatsu Hōjō	Toshihiko Masuda	May 18, 2003	October 18, 2003
Nelson and Lindsey return to work, with Chris and his mother both being unhappy about their absence, while Cream misses her mother. Sam Speed is revealed to be Chris' uncle, while Thorndykes' maid and chef, Ella, (Note: Voiced by Kujira in Japanese and Mike Pollock in English.) and butler, Mr. Tanaka, (Note: Voiced by Naoki Imamura in Japanese and Darren Dunstan in English.) learn about the animals.
8	"Emergency Takeoff! X-Tornado" ("Satellite Swindle"); Transliteration: "Kinkyū hasshin! X Torunēdo" (Japanese: 緊急発進！Xトルネード)	Makoto Bessho	Masahiko Shiraishi	Makoto Bessho	May 25, 2003	October 25, 2003
Eggman uses a rocket ship, E-90 Super Sweeper, to suck up satellites for parts. Sonic and Tails use the Tornado to fly to it, but are unable to keep up. Tails and Chuck convert the Tornado into the more powerful X-Tornado, powered by the green Chaos Emerald, and the team destroys the Super Sweeper.
9	"Amy at the Beach" ("The Last Resort"); Transliteration: "Nagisa no Emī" (Japanese: 渚のエミー)	Keiichirō Furuya	Kiyoko Yoshimura	Kazuhide Tomonaga	June 1, 2003	November 1, 2003
While Chris attends the grand opening of "Hotel de Blanc" as a representative of the Thorndyke family, Amy, Tails, Cream, and Cheese visit the Thorndykes' private beach villa. Sonic stays behind due to his inability to swim and distaste for the ocean, while Amy, who has a crush on him, makes a special charm that supposedly improves swimming ability as a gift for him. Eggman destroys Hotel de Blanc and builds a theme park in its place, and Sonic comes to stop him, but is saved by Amy after Eggman uses Sonic's weakness against him. An Eggman robot breaks Amy's charm, causing her to enter a fit of rage; she is flung into the ocean, and Sonic reluctantly dives in to save her. When Amy comes to, she grieves the loss of the charm but vows to make another, while Sonic is seen looking out over the sea, holding a repaired charm.
10	"Fierce Fight! Sonic Baseball Team" ("Unfair Ball"); Transliteration: "Gekitō! Sonikku yakyūgun" (Japanese: 激闘！ソニック野球軍)	Masafumi Satō	Mutsumi Mikuni	Masafumi Satō	June 8, 2003	November 8, 2003
As Tails cruises in the X-Tornado, the green Chaos Emerald draws him to Diamond Stadium, a ballpark whose groundskeeper, Albert Butler, (Note: Voiced by Tomohisa Asō in Japanese and Oliver Wyman in English.) tells Tails that Diamond Stadium will soon be demolished because its home team is moving to an indoor stadium, and has found the cyan Emerald at the stadium. Eggman challenges Sonic and co. to a baseball game against his robots for both Emeralds, and as the two teams play, the stands fill with spectators; inspired, the team's manager, Elmer Johnson, offers to move Diamond Stadium's turf to the team's new stadium, which Albert agrees to. Sonic's team defeats Eggman's, but he steals the cyan Emerald and escapes.
11	"The Beautiful, Mysterious Thief, Rouge" ("Fly Spy"); Transliteration: "Utsukushiki kaitō Rūju" (Japanese: 美しき怪盗ルージュ)	Keiko Oyamada	Hiro Masaki	Toshihiko Masuda	June 15, 2003	November 15, 2003
The President seeks Sonic's help to attack Eggman's fortress. They set a trap for him under the guise of having a Chaos Emerald, but catch Rouge the Bat instead, who has become a serial jewel thief. In exchange for amnesty, the President gives Rouge a job as an agent; she accepts, reasoning that being an agent will give her information about the Emeralds, which she seeks for herself. She and the agent Topaz go on a mission to infiltrate Eggman's fortress. Despite distrust of Rouge, they gain information about the fortress and Rouge saves Topaz from Eggman's robot. Meanwhile, Chris introduces his friend Danny to Sonic and the others.
12	"Assault on Eggman's Base! (Part I)" ("Beating Eggman, Part 1"); Transliteration: "Egguman kichi sōkōgeki! (zenpen)" (Japanese: エッグマン基地 総攻撃！（前編）)	Naoyuki Kuzuya	Hiro Masaki	Naoyuki Kuzuya	June 22, 2003	November 22, 2003
Chris, Tails, Amy, and Chris' friend Frances detect a Chaos Emerald underground in a cornfield. While they dig for it, Eggman arrives to take it for himself; the heroes attempt to defeat his wind-blowing robot, E-35 Funfun, by transforming the X-Tornado into the X-Cyclone, but struggle against it. Mr. Stewart, who has been tailing Chris and co., calls the Thorndyke residence, and Sonic rushes to their aid. Meanwhile, the President sends Rouge and Topaz inside Eggman's fortress while the navy and air force attack it from outside, in hopes of stopping him once and for all.
13	"Assault on Eggman's Base! (Part II)" ("Beating Eggman, Part 2"); Transliteration: "Egguman kichi sōkōgeki! (kōhen)" (Japanese: エッグマン基地 総攻撃！（後編）)	Eiichi Kuboyama	Hiro Masaki	Satoshi Kimura	June 29, 2003	November 29, 2003
Sonic destroys Funfun, but Eggman escapes with the yellow Chaos Emerald. Sonic, Tails, Amy, Chris, and Frances fly to Eggman's fortress, where the attack is underway, with Knuckles hitching a ride on an Air Force plane and finding Rouge and Topaz. They plant an explosive charge to destroy the fortress, but are locked inside while the timer runs. Sonic takes the cyan and yellow Chaos Emeralds from Eggman's robot and uses their power to break out Rouge, Topaz, and Knuckles before escaping as the charge detonates, destroying Eggman's fortress. The people of Station Square, watching the attack on television, celebrate the victory.
14	"Chase After the Hero, Sonic!" ("That's What Friends Are For"); Transliteration: "Eiyū Sonikku o oe!" (Japanese: 英雄ソニックを追え！)	Keiko Oyamada	Yoshio Urasawa	Kenji Yazaki	July 6, 2003	December 6, 2003
Since the public largely gives Sonic credit for defeating Eggman, the President's aide organizes a party for Sonic and the press, hoping to associate the two in the media so that the President can win reelection. Sonic does not attend the party with his friends, as he promised Chris' physically disabled classmate Helen that he would take her to an island to see flowers, which her father is unable to do because he is too busy working to support her. The President's aide deploys the military to find Sonic and bring him to the party, and Sonic and Helen's excursion becomes a chase as Sonic pushes her wheelchair. After escaping by stealing a helicopter, Sonic and Helen go to the President's party and Sonic shakes his hand, but the reporters are unable to take pictures because they are drunk. (Note: In the English version, they are simply tired from the long wait.) Later, as Helen tells the story of her first adventure to her parents, they commit to spending more time with her.
15	"Attack of the Mobile Fortress, Egg Fort!" ("Skirmish in the Sky"); Transliteration: "Idōyōsai Eggu Fōto shūrai!" (Japanese: 移動要塞エッグフォート襲来！)	Toshikiyo Ishikawa	Kiyoko Yoshimura	Toshihiko Masuda	July 13, 2003	December 13, 2003
Chris and Ella take Tails, Amy, Cream, and Cheese shopping in Station Square since they are now publicly-known figures, but struggle to do things without drawing attention. Meanwhile, at the wreckage of Eggman's fortress, the airship Egg Fort emerges and terrorizes the city while Sonic is unable to reach it. Chris' group escapes the city, aided by Mr. Stewart, Sam Speed, and Mr. Tanaka, and bring the X-Tornado to Sonic. Sonic destroys the Egg Fort and it falls into the ocean, but the heroes assume that it will return.
16	"Aim for It! The Sunken Ship of the Southern Sea" ("Depths of Danger"); Transliteration: "Mezase! Nankai no chinbotsusen" (Japanese: 目指せ！南海の沈没船)	Masafumi Satō	Chinatsu Hōjō	Masafumi Satō	July 20, 2003	January 17, 2004
As thanks for their service to the country, the government issues Social Security numbers and passports to the animals, as well as a pilot's license and other permits for Tails. Chris and the animals travel to the Sapphire Sea for a vacation, where they detect a fourth Chaos Emerald underwater. When they go to a store to get scuba diving gear and a boat to search for the Emerald, they learn of a legend about a sunken ship with treasure inside. As the heroes dive, they find the blue Emerald among the ship's sunken treasure. Meanwhile, as Eggman learns about Sonic's vacation, he emerges from the ocean to ruin it; Sonic defeats him with Sam Speed's help, but the sunken ship is buried under rocks during the battle. When they go to return the diving equipment, they tell the owner that the ship was buried, but he is glad that the legend was true, as it was his grandfather's boat.
17	"Knuckles! Fist of Fury" ("The Adventures of Knuckles and Hawk"); Transliteration: "Nakkuruzu! Ikari no tekken" (Japanese: ナックルズ！怒りの鉄拳)	Hiroshi Kimura	Masahiko Shiraishi	Toshihiko Masuda	July 27, 2003	January 24, 2004
Knuckles befriends Hawk, a fellow treasure hunter who invites him to Oriental City, where he believes he has found a Chaos Emerald. Knuckles and Hawk dig up the red Emerald from the subway, but get into a fight with Eggman's robot, E-91 Lady Ninja, over it. During the battle, the Emerald is buried under a pile of heavy rock, and Knuckles retrieves the Shovel Claws to dig it out. As Knuckles and Hawk escape the City with the Emerald, they are pursued by Lady Ninja and Rouge. After destroying Lady Ninja, Knuckles leaves Hawk and floats away on a boat, and the red Emerald gives him a cryptic vision of the Master Emerald. Note: The episode's Japanese title is a reference to the 1972 Hong Kong martial arts film of the same name.
18	"Huge Shoot-out on the Savannah!" ("The Dam Scam"); Transliteration: "Sabanna no dai kettō!" (Japanese: サバンナの大決闘！)	Makoto Moriwaki	Hiro Masaki	Naoyuki Kuzuya	August 3, 2003	January 31, 2004
Following an aerial battle, Sonic, Tails, Chris, and Eggman crash-land in a savanna. Tails and Chris find a construction company building a dam. To help the animals, they get the people of a nearby city to picket against the dam's construction, forcing it to close. Meanwhile, Sonic battles Eggman's ape robot, E-65 Gorru-Gaooh; Eggman and Gorru-Gaooh inadvertently destroy the construction site and thwart the construction manager's schemes before Sonic defeats Eggman and the managers are arrested.
19	"The Ghost of the Old Castle, King Boom Boo" ("Sonic's Scream Test"); Transliteration: "Kojō no bōrei Kingu Būbu" (Japanese: 古城の亡霊キングブーブ)	Keiko Oyamada & Sim Sang-il	Hiro Masaki	Toshihiko Masuda	August 10, 2003	February 7, 2004
The heroes visit a castle to watch Lindsey film a movie. When a cameraman disturbs an hourglass-shaped stone from a pedestal, ghosts appear and kidnap several people, except for Chris and Amy. They discover an underground chamber under the pedestal and venture down to where the people are being held captive. The leader of the ghosts, King Boom Boo, mimics Sonic's voice and tricks Amy into placing the hourglass into a slot, strengthening him. Chris flips the hourglass, freeing the kidnapped people and allowing Sonic and Amy to defeat the ghosts; after the heroes escape, they seal off the underground chamber.: King Boom Boo is based on the boss that Knuckles fought in Sonic Adventure 2.
20	"Departure! Egg Fort II" ("Cruise Blues"); Transliteration: "Shutsugeki! Eggu Fōto II" (Japanese: 出撃！エッグフォートII)	Nana Harada	Hiro Masaki	Hajime Kamegaki	August 17, 2003	February 14, 2004
The heroes go on vacation on a cruise ship. Sonic struggles to relax without an open space to run in, so Nelson sends a group of senior citizens to help him learn to slow down. Meanwhile, Eggman abandons the Egg Fort and debuts the Egg Fort II. He sends his robot courier, Bokkun, to announce it at the Thorndyke mansion, before blowing up a bomb in Ella's face. Eggman finds the cruise ship, but before Sonic can fight him, an enraged Ella arrives in the X-Tornado to eliminate him personally. Tails asks Sonic if he wants to leave the cruise early, but Sonic decides to stay and relax instead.
21	"Speed Match! Sonic vs. Sam" ("Fast Friends"); Transliteration: "Supīdo shōbu! Sonikku vs Samu" (Japanese: スピード勝負！ソニックvsサム)	Yukio Okazaki	Yoshio Urasawa	Toshihiko Masuda	August 24, 2003	February 21, 2004
Sam Speed challenges Sonic to a race with a new car, but Sonic is not interested. The President's aide, intending to use the race as a publicity stunt for the President, convinces Eggman to persuade Sonic, and Sonic agrees to race after Eggman sends a kissing robot that will kiss Sonic if he does not race. Sonic and Sam have a close race, but Sonic wins. The President is running late at a meeting, so the President's aide intends to take his place in the press photos so that he can become President himself. However, he receives a call notifying him that he has been fired from his position for conspiring with Eggman.
22	"Summer Vacation - Chao Observation Diary" ("Little Chao Lost"); Transliteration: "Natsuyasumi Chao~ na kansatsu nikki" (Japanese: 夏休み・チャオ〜な観察日記)	Masafumi Satō	Kiyoko Yoshimura	Kōichi Sasaki	August 31, 2003	February 28, 2004
Chris, Danny, Frances, Mr. Stewart, and the animals camp with Mr. Tanaka near his Japanese hometown for summer break. After Cheese is swept away by a river current, the heroes discover a Chao colony in a secluded area. Meanwhile, on vacation, Eggman's mecha falls due to the soft terrain, dirtying the river and endangering the Chao, who must live in clean water. After exploring the town and enjoying his fame, Sonic destroys Eggman's mecha and rescues the Chao habitat by running around the water and blowing the dirt out.
23	"Mayhem! The Sixth Chaos Emerald" ("Emerald Anniversary"); Transliteration: "Daikonran! 6 Kaosu Emerarudo" (Japanese: 大混乱！6カオスエメラルド)	Keiko Oyamada & Sim Sang-il	Chinatsu Hōjō	Toshihiko Masuda	September 7, 2003	March 6, 2004
Nelson purchases a ring containing the purple Chaos Emerald, intending to give it to Lindsey for their wedding anniversary. The heroes travel to "Filmdom City" to see Nelson present the ring to Lindsey, but Rouge and Topaz, as well as Eggman, seek the Emerald for themselves. Sonic, Knuckles, and Eggman fight across several film sets, but Eggman escapes with the Emerald. Despite the loss of the ring, the heroes celebrate the Thorndykes' anniversary.
24	"Runaway Sonic! Big Capture Operation" ("How to Catch a Hedgehog"); Transliteration: "Bōsō Sonikku! Hokaku daisakusen" (Japanese: 暴走ソニック！捕獲大作戦)	Makoto Moriwaki	Masahiko Shiraishi	Kōji Hōri	September 14, 2003	March 13, 2004
After saving Amy from a Eggman robot, Sonic gets a circuit board from it lodged in his ear, forcing him to run without stopping. He runs to the badlands to not endanger the city. Over the next two days, Sonic's friends attempt to trap him and stop him from running, but they all fail. Eventually, they lead him back to where he fought the robot, and after saving Amy from it again, the board comes loose, allowing him to stop.
25	"The Last Chaos Emerald" ("A Dastardly Deed"); Transliteration: "Saigo no Kaosu Emerarudo" (Japanese: 最後のカオスエメラルド)	Yukio Okazaki	Hiro Masaki	Toshihiko Masuda	September 21, 2003	March 20, 2004
Sonic and co. hold four Chaos Emeralds, and Knuckles and Eggman each have one. Chris is torn on whether he wants Sonic and friends to return to their world or if he wants them to stay. Knuckles realizes they cannot do Chaos Control if the Emeralds are separate, so he takes Chris to make a deal with Eggman. As part of the deal, Chris takes the Emeralds without Sonic knowing, and he and Knuckles give their Emeralds to Eggman. When his robot, E-77 Lucky, finds the final Emerald, the white Chaos Emerald, Eggman captures Chris and leaves in the Egg Fort II.
26	"Birth! Super Sonic" ("Countdown to Chaos"); Transliteration: "Tanjō! Sūpā Sonikku" (Japanese: 誕生！スーパーソニック)	Hajime Kamegaki	Hiro Masaki	Hajime Kamegaki	September 28, 2003	March 27, 2004
Sonic reaches the Egg Fort II and recovers the white Chaos Emerald from Lucky. The Egg Fort II transforms into a large robot and throws him into the sea, while Chris breaks free from his restraints and grabs the six Emeralds, intending to avert Chaos Control. Chris also falls into the sea; he is saved by Rouge, but the Emeralds fall into the water and react with the Emerald Sonic holds, transforming him into Super Sonic. After Super Sonic destroys the Egg Fort II, Chaos Control occurs, and another burst of light appears. Chris cries, believing that Sonic will leave, but when the light clears, Sonic appears in front of Chris, showing that they are still together.: The original Japanese TV broadcast uses an insert song, "Kotoba ni Dekinai" by OFF COURSE, while the home video release uses an instrumental of "The Shining Road".

=== Season 2: The Chaos, Shadow, Egg Moon, Emerl, and Homebound Sagas (2003–04) ===
No. overall	No. in season	Title	Directed by	Written by	Storyboarded by	Original release date	American air date
27	1	"The Beginning of the Disaster" ("Pure Chaos"); Transliteration: "Wazawai no hajimari" (Japanese: 災いのはじまり)	Kazuyoshi Yokota	Kiyoko Yoshimura	Kazuyoshi Yokota	October 5, 2003	September 18, 2004
Chaos Control does not send Sonic and friends back to their world, but instead brings more elements from it to Earth, including the floating Angel Island where the Master Emerald is. Six months later, Eggman has been quiet, secretly developing an E-100 Series of robots—including E-101 Beta, E-102 Gamma, E-103 Delta, and E-104 Epsilon, each powered by a small animal—on his new ship, the Egg Carrier. Big the Cat discovers the purple Chaos Emerald; his pet (non-anthropomorphic) frog, Froggy, swallows a blue liquid and steals the Emerald before running away. Big comes to Chris, Cream, and Cheese for assistance in finding him; during their search, they encounter the blue liquid, which forms into Chaos, a humanoid monster which grows stronger upon consuming Chaos Emeralds. Sonic arrives after having gone on a solo journey, along with Knuckles, who is searching for the missing Master Emerald. Eggman appears and reveals his plan to use Chaos to take over the world, feeding him the yellow and red Emeralds; though Sonic and Knuckles defeat Chaos, he escapes with Eggman.: This episode begins an adaptation of the video game Sonic Adventure.
28	2	"The Mysterious Lifeform, Chaos" ("A Chaotic Day"); Transliteration: "Nazo no seimeitai Kaosu" (Japanese: 謎の生命体カオス)	Masafumi Satō	Kiyoko Yoshimura	Kazuhito Kikuchi	October 12, 2003	September 25, 2004
Sonic enlists Tails' help to find the Chaos Emeralds before Eggman. They discover the cyan Emerald, but Eggman arrives and steals it and Tails' green Emerald, feeding them to Chaos, but Sonic is able to defeat him. Meanwhile, Knuckles finds a shard of the shattered Master Emerald, which shows him a vision of an ancient echidna tribe in front of the Master Emerald; in it, a young girl, Tikal, pleads for her father, the tribal leader Pachacamac, to stop warring with other countries for their Chaos Emeralds, but he refuses. Amy, Cream, and Cheese meet a bird with a Chaos Emerald around her neck, who they name Lily, but Eggman's E-100 ZERO abducts Amy and Lily.
29	3	"Amy the Captive" ("A Robot Rebels"); Transliteration: "Toraware no Emī" (Japanese: 囚われのエミー)	Keiko Oyamada & Sim Sang-il	Chinatsu Hōjō	Toshihiko Masuda	October 19, 2003	October 2, 2004
Big and Chris fish up the missing Froggy, but Gamma steals him and takes him to the Egg Carrier, which they sneak on board. Eggman takes Froggy and dismisses the other three E-100s, instructing Gamma to bring him Lily; however, when it sees Beta being disassembled and Amy pleading for Gamma to be kind, he frees Amy and Lily from their cell, allowing them to escape. Meanwhile, Knuckles finds more shards of the Master Emerald and brings them to Angel Island, although some shards are still missing, and sees another vision in which Tikal learns that the Master Emerald controls the seven Chaos Emeralds. Sonic and Tails meet up with Knuckles in the X-Tornado, and make a crash landing on the Egg Carrier to rescue Amy and Lily.
30	4	"Battle on the Egg Carrier" ("Heads Up, Tails!"); Transliteration: "Eggu Kyaria no tatakai" (Japanese: エッグキャリアの戦い)	Shigeru Yazaki	Yoshio Urasawa	Hiro Masaki	October 26, 2003	October 9, 2004
On the ship, Eggman takes the blue Chaos Emerald from Lily, while Sonic battles Gamma, but Amy forbids him from destroying him. Tails takes Amy and Lily back to the ground, and Amy vows to find Lily's family, who had been captured by Eggman. Meanwhile, Knuckles finds the remaining Master Emerald shards and sees a vision in which Tikal tells Knuckles that she failed to stop her father. Knuckles helps Sonic defeat Chaos, who now possesses six Chaos Emeralds, and Eggman tries to flee, but Sonic follows and is dropped to the ground, where he finds an overgrown temple. Big and Chris rescue Froggy after Eggman takes his Emerald, and they and Knuckles, who retrieves the Chaos Emeralds, return to the ground; Knuckles goes to repair the Master Emerald, while Big and Froggy return home. Back in Station Square, Tails defuses an Eggman missile and learns to be confident without Sonic, earning cheers from the civilians.
31	5	"Gamma the Wanderer" ("Revenge of the Robot"); Transliteration: "Sasurai no Ganma" (Japanese: さすらいのガンマ)	Makoto Moriwaki	Masahiko Shiraishi	Makoto Moriwaki	November 2, 2003	October 16, 2004
Gamma denounces Eggman as his master and shuts down Delta and Epsilon to free the animals trapped inside before returning to the Egg Carrier to do the same to Beta, while Amy and Lily return to find Lily's family. Gamma defeats an upgraded Beta, Kai, before he self-destructs, revealing Lily's two family members. Amy tearfully says goodbye to Gamma and promises they will be friends forever, while Sonic enters the temple and sees a vision of Tikal running toward the Master Emerald to stop her father.
32	6	"The Scream of Perfect Chaos" ("Flood Fight"); Transliteration: "Pāfekuto Kaosu no sakebi" (Japanese: パーフェクトカオスの叫び)	Nana Harada	Masahiko Shiraishi	Toshiki Hirano	November 9, 2003	October 23, 2004
Chaos breaks free of Eggman's control, and Sonic and Knuckles see a vision of Chaos appearing and Tikal praying to the Master Emerald for help. Chris brings the white seventh Chaos Emerald to Knuckles, inadvertently gathering all seven Emeralds; with their power, he transforms into Perfect Chaos, who destroys the center of Station Square. Sonic and co. arrive and the spirit of Tikal appears, revealing that she has kept Chaos dormant with her sadness until Eggman got to him. Perfect Chaos spits out the Emeralds, which have been drained of their energy; however, the love of Sonic, his friends, and the Station Square populace restores the Emeralds' power, transforming Sonic into Super Sonic. Super Sonic fights Perfect Chaos and purifies him, causing him to revert to his base form and allowing him and Tikal to pass on.: This episode concludes the Sonic Adventure adaptation.
33	7	"The Mystery of Project Shadow" ("Project: Shadow"); Transliteration: "Purojekuto Shadō no nazo" (Japanese: プロジェクトシャドウの謎)	Keiko Oyamada & Eom Sang-yong	Hiro Masaki	Toshihiko Masuda	November 16, 2003	October 30, 2004
In the aftermath of Perfect Chaos' destruction and rebuildiing following the flooding of Station Square, Eggman hacks into a Guardian Units of Nations (G.U.N.) database and finds records of his late grandfather, Professor Gerald Robotnik, meaning that Eggman was born on Earth; he concludes that Earth and Sonic's world are in parallel universes. He additionally finds records of "Project Shadow", a secret project from 50 years ago. The government learns about the hack, and Rouge and Topaz steal the Master Emerald and the blue Chaos Emerald to lure out Eggman so they can keep him under surveillance. Mr. Stewart offers to help reporter Scarlet Garcia learn about Project Shadow. Eggman breaks into G.U.N. and finds the secret project, revealing Shadow the Hedgehog.: This episode begins an adaptation of the video game Sonic Adventure 2.
34	8	"Sonic the Fugitive" ("Shadow Knows"); Transliteration: "Tōbōsha Sonikku" (Japanese: 逃亡者ソニック)	Masafumi Satō	Masahiko Shiraishi	Kazuhito Kikuchi	November 23, 2003	November 6, 2004
Shadow pledges allegiance to Eggman for freeing him, and the government pursues Sonic, mistaking Shadow for him and believing that Sonic is responsible for stealing a Chaos Emerald. Eventually, Sonic and Shadow meet; Sonic learns that Shadow can use Chaos Control with one Chaos Emerald which he stole to teleport. Shadow leaves when the police come, and Sonic turns himself in, telling Chris that he will see him again soon. Shadow tells Eggman that to use a powerful weapon called the Eclipse Cannon, they will need all seven Chaos Emeralds; Rouge brings the blue Emerald to Eggman and says that she can help him find more if he cooperates. Chris and Mr. Tanaka travel to Prison Island, where Sonic is being held.
35	9	"Escape from Prison Island" ("Sonic's Big Break"); Transliteration: "Purizun Airando kara no dasshutsu" (Japanese: プリズンアイランドからの脱出)	Ichizō Fukushima	Chinatsu Hōjō	Jōhei Matsuura	November 30, 2003	November 13, 2004
Tails and Amy come to Prison Island to rescue Sonic in the X-Tornado. Amy comes to free Sonic in his isolation cell, and he reveals that he turned himself in to get information about Shadow before they escape. Meanwhile, Eggman brings Shadow and Rouge to Prison Island to get the Chaos Emeralds held there, as well as to detonate the island and defeat Sonic for good. Rouge finds three Chaos Emeralds, but is locked inside the building as the timed charges counts down. After a fight with Sonic, Shadow uses Chaos Control to retrieve Rouge and the Emeralds, but Chris finds Shadow and mistakes him for Sonic, causing Chaos Control to bring Chris along. Chris begs Shadow to help him save Sonic, as Chris reminds Shadow of a young girl named Maria, he reluctantly teleports Chris along with himself and Rouge just before the island explodes.
36	10	"Threat from Outer Space" ("Shadow World"); Transliteration: "Uchū kara no kyōhaku" (Japanese: 宇宙からの脅迫)	Shigeru Yazaki	Hiro Masaki	Seiji Okuda	December 7, 2003	November 20, 2004
Shadow, Rouge, and Chris teleport to the "Space Colony ARK", Shadow's former home and the location of the Eclipse Cannon. Shadow remembers the events of 50 years ago. Maria Robotnik, Gerald's granddaughter, was Shadow's friend on the ARK, but was shot by G.U.N. when she helped Shadow escape to Earth. Before dying, she asked Shadow to do something; he does not remember what, but assumes that it was to get revenge for her death. With six Chaos Emeralds, Eggman fires the Eclipse Cannon at the Moon as a warning shot, destroying half of it; he promises to use the Cannon to destroy Earth if the President refuses to submit. Meanwhile, the heroes prepare to fly to the ARK, but since they only possess the yellow Emerald but need two for the X-Tornado to reach the ARK, Tails creates a less powerful, imperfect replica of the Emerald. The heroes find a pyramid in the desert containing a rocket ship, which they decide to use instead of the X-Tornado because it seats more people.
37	11	"Battle on the Space Colony ARK" ("Robotnik's Revenge"); Transliteration: "Supēsu koronī Āku no tatakai" (Japanese: スペースコロニー・アークの戦い)	Mamoru Enomoto	Kiyoko Yoshimura	Toshihiko Masuda	December 14, 2003	November 27, 2004
The heroes arrive at the Space Colony ARK, where Tails gives Sonic the fake Chaos Emerald and says that it may be able to stop the Eclipse Cannon by absorbing the Emeralds' energy and exploding. Eggman catches Sonic in a capsule rigged to explode with the fake Emerald and ejects the pod; however, Sonic is able to escape by using Chaos Control. Meanwhile, Knuckles retrieves the Master Emerald after a fight with Rouge, which ends with them on friendly terms. Sonic tries to get to the Cannon's core with the fake Emerald, but is contested by Shadow. Eggman tries to fire the Cannon, but it fizzles out and a video message from Gerald appears, saying that the ARK will collide with Earth in less than 30 minutes, destroying the world as revenge for Maria's death. After finding several dead ends, Mr. Stewart and Scarlet Garcia meet with a former G.U.N. operative, who regretfully tells the story of the day he killed Maria, while men in black attack in an attempt to preserve the Project Shadow cover-up.
38	12	"Maria's Wish, Everyone's Wish" ("Showdown In Space"); Transliteration: "Maria no negai, minna no negai" (Japanese: マリアの願い、みんなの願い)	Nana Harada	Kiyoko Yoshimura	Toshiki Hirano	December 21, 2003	December 4, 2004
In the video, after Gerald finishes his message, he is executed by firing squad. The heroes and Eggman form a plan to use the Master Emerald to neutralize the Chaos Emeralds, while Chris convinces Shadow to save Earth, causing Shadow to remember that Maria's wish was for him to help humanity reach their potential. Sonic, Eggman and their allies, joined by Shadow, battle the Biolizard, a Project Shadow prototype, and stop the Emeralds; however, the Biolizard attaches itself to the Space Colony ARK to destroy Earth. Sonic and Shadow use the Emeralds to transform into Super Sonic and Super Shadow and stop the ARK. As they battle the Biolizard in space, Scarlet Garcia broadcasts a message explaining the ARK, and the people cheer for Sonic and Shadow, who stop the ARK using Chaos Control. However, Shadow does not make it back to Earth with them, and, as they return to Earth, Sonic says farewell to him.: This episode concludes the Sonic Adventure 2 adaptation.
39	13	"The Chaotix Detective Agency" ("Defective Detectives"); Transliteration: "Kaotikusu tantei jimusho" (Japanese: カオティクス探偵事務所)	Makoto Moriwaki	Yoshio Urasawa	Hajime Kamegaki	December 28, 2003	December 11, 2004
The use of Chaos Control at the Space Colony ARK brings in more of Sonic's world, including the Chaotix Detective Agency, comprising Vector the Crocodile, Espio the Chameleon, and Charmy Bee. They see a newspaper about Sonic and track him to the Thorndyke mansion; there, Vanilla the Rabbit appears and reunites with Cream, who is revealed to be her daughter, thanking Sonic and co. for taking care of her and the Chaotix for finding her. Meanwhile, Eggman tells the President that he has reformed and rebuilds the Moon's destroyed half with metal, making it the "Egg Moon"; when Sonic talks to him, Eggman affirms that he is being genuine, but it is secretly an act.
40	14	"Eggman Company" ("Sunblock Solution"); Transliteration: "Egguman kabushikigaisha" (Japanese: エッグマン株式会社)	Masafumi Satō	Hiro Masaki	Matsuo Asami	January 4, 2004	December 18, 2004
The Egg Moon passes in front of the Sun and stays there, causing a perpetual solar eclipse. Eggman maintains that this was an accident and that it will take a year to fix the Egg Moon, in the meantime introducing "Sunshine Balls", which project real sunlight gathered by a dish-shaped satellite. The Sunshine Balls are a hit, but Sonic distrusts Eggman and starts destroying the Mirror Towers which power the Sunshine Balls, making him an enemy of the people.
41	15	"Give Us the Light!" ("Eggman for President"); Transliteration: "Hikari o warera ni!" (Japanese: 光をわれらに！)	Mamoru Enomoto	Hiro Masaki	Kiyoshi Egami	January 11, 2004	January 22, 2005
The Sunshine Balls have secretly been transmitting subliminal messages, causing Eggman to become an idolized figure as he forcefully takes control of the government. Meanwhile, Chris begins to doubt Sonic's good intentions, but Sonic explains that he knows the Egg Moon is being remotely controlled by Eggman because it would take intentional complex movement to constantly keep the Moon between the Sun and Earth. They fly into space and destroy the Egg Moon's receivers, after which Eggman is arrested and Sonic's name is cleared.
42	16	"Amy's Love Went Away?!" ("A Date to Forget"); Transliteration: "Emī ai no tōhikō!?" (Japanese: エミー愛の逃避行！？)	Shigeru Yazaki	Kiyoko Yoshimura	Seiji Okuda	January 18, 2004	January 29, 2005
Bokkun reactivates an old humanoid robot named Emerl and attacks Sonic in an Emerl-powered tank. Sonic misses a scheduled date with Amy while fighting the tank; when Sam Speed arrives at the house to race Sonic, Amy instead invites Sam on a date. As they drive, Amy realizes that Sonic's lifestyle is too fast for him to make much time for her, but decides to continue romantically pursuing him anyway. They come across an unmanned Eggman vehicle headed toward the city and work together to destroy it, but Emerl escapes. Sonic finds Amy and apologizes for missing their date, but leaves her behind to go on a race with Sam as Cream and Cheese discover Emerl at the house.
43	17	"Huge Home Electronics Panic!!" ("Mean Machines"); Transliteration: "Kaden daipanikku!!" (Japanese: 家電大パニック！！)	Jōhei Matsuura	Hiro Masaki	Jōhei Matsuura	January 25, 2004	February 5, 2005
A growing movement inspired by Sonic's carefree attitude causes workers at Nelson's factory to slack and create shoddy products. While working on repairing the returned appliances in prison, Eggman adds computer chips which cause them to become evil. Nelson and Lindsey return home after Chris catches a fever, where appliances start attacking. Despite losing his memory data, Emerl identifies Sonic and learns and imitates his fighting techniques to aid in battle. Chris goes on a mission with his family to release a large volume of water to short out the appliances, deactivating them as Bokkun breaks Eggman out of prison and they escape.
44	18	"The Ridiculously Epic Spy Operation" ("Sewer Search"); Transliteration: "Okashi na okashi na supai daisakusen" (Japanese: おかしなおかしなスパイ大作戦)	Nana Harada	Yoshio Urasawa	Toshiki Hirano	February 1, 2004	February 12, 2005
Chris and his classmates join Mr. Stewart's search for Eggman, leading to a battle in the sewers with help from Sonic, Emerl, Rouge, and Topaz, but Eggman escapes with books to help his next evil scheme.
45	19	"Sonic Battle – Face Off!" ("Prize Fights"); Transliteration: "Sonikku Batoru kaisai!!" (Japanese: ソニックバトル・開催！！)	Kenichi Maejima	Hiro Masaki & Chinatsu Hōjō	Masanori Mizuhara	February 8, 2004	February 19, 2005
The President organizes a fighting tournament with Sonic and friends' participation, with the prize being a Chaos Emerald, in attempt to draw in the escaped Eggman. He indeed arrives and attacks Sonic; Sonic forfeits his match to chase Eggman.
46	20	"Sonic Battle – Finals!!" ("A Wild Win"); Transliteration: "Sonikku Batoru kesshō!!" (Japanese: ソニックバトル・決勝！！)	Kazuyoshi Yokota	Hiro Masaki & Chinatsu Hōjō	Kazuhito Kikuchi	February 15, 2004	February 26, 2005
Emerl ultimately wins the tournament, but goes haywire when exposed to the Chaos Emerald. Due to Emerl's ability to mimic attacks, no one is able to stop him until Cream and Cheese attack him synchronously, which he is unable to replicate. Cream and Cheese tearfully knock Emerl into the ocean, permanently decommissioning him.
47	21	"The Great Showdown at Latitude Zero!!" ("Map of Mayhem"); Transliteration: "Ido 0 daikessen!!" (Japanese: 緯度0大決戦！！)	Makoto Moriwaki	Masahiko Shiraishi	Makoto Moriwaki	February 22, 2004	March 5, 2005
Eggman claims that he will use his giant battleship to stimulate the "belly button of the world", where submarine volcanic chains run through, and destroy the planet, and Sonic and his friends try to stop him.: The episode's Japanese title is similar to the Japanese title of the 1969 sci-fi film Latitude Zero, and there are several homages to the movie throughout the episode.
48	22	"Sonic vs. The Underground Monsters" ("The Volcanic Venture"); Transliteration: "Sonikku tai chitei kaijū" (Japanese: ソニック対地底怪獣)	Yoshihiro Yamaguchi	Masahiko Shiraishi	Seiji Okuda	February 29, 2004	March 12, 2005
Eggman escapes into the crater of a volcanic island in his Egg Giant-Makan, and Sonic and his friends pursue him through the crater to the underground world, where they encounter giant monsters.: The episode's Japanese title is similar to the Japanese title of the 1965 sci-fi kaiju film Frankenstein Conquers the World, and there are several homages to the movie throughout the episode.
49	23	"The Day the World Stood Still" ("The Beginning of the End"); Transliteration: "Sekai ga seishi suru hi" (Japanese: 世界が静止する日)	Mamoru Enomoto	Masahiko Shiraishi	Kiyoshi Egami	March 7, 2004	March 12, 2005
According to the government, when Sonic and his friends are on Earth, a phenomenon called "Time Stagnation" occurs, causing time to become abnormal. The governors propose to return them to their world, but Chris is reluctant.: The episode's Japanese title is similar to the title of the 1951 sci-fi film The Day the Earth Stood Still.
50	24	"The Morning of Farewells" ("Running Out of Time"); Transliteration: "Wakare no asa" (Japanese: 別れの朝)	Masami Furukawa	Chinatsu Hōjō	Toshiki Hirano	March 14, 2004	March 19, 2005
In order to return Sonic and his friends to their world, Tails and Chuck hurry to develop the device while GUN troopers suddenly begin attacking Dr. Eggman's base against the President's orders.
51	25	"Chris' Long Journey" ("Friends 'till the End"); Transliteration: "Kurisu no nagai tabi" (Japanese: クリスの長い旅)	Shigeharu Takahashi	Kiyoko Yoshimura	Masanori Mizuhara	March 21, 2004	March 19, 2005
Just as Sonic is about to return to his world, Chris runs away with him.
52	26	"Memories of the Wind" ("A New Start"); Transliteration: "Kaze no omoide" (Japanese: 風の思い出)	Hajime Kamegaki	Yoshio Urasawa	Hajime Kamegaki	March 28, 2004	March 26, 2005
Sonic returns to his world, and Chris looks up at the moon as he reflects on his memories of him.: The original TV broadcast used insert songs "Natsu no Hi" and "Midori no Hibi" by OFF COURSE, while home video releases use "Hikaru Michi" and "Event: The Last Scene" from Sonic Adventure 2.; This was intended to be the series finale before it was renewed for a third and final season.

=== Season 3: The Metarex Saga (2005) ===
No. overall	No. in season	Title	Directed by	Written by	Storyboarded by	Japanese air date	International air date(s)
53	1	"A Messenger From A Meteor Shower" ("A Cosmic Call"); Transliteration: "Ryūseiu no shisha" (Japanese: 流星雨の使者)	Mitsutaka Noshitani	Kiyoko Yoshimura	Toshiki Hirano	March 25, 2020	March 12, 2005 (France) September 10, 2005 (US)
A new enemy called the Metarex appears on Sonic's planet and Sonic struggles against them and its leader, Dark Oak; in the chaos, the Chaos Emeralds are scattered, and the Planet Egg, the source of life on the planet, is stolen. Meanwhile, a now 18-year-old Chris arrives in space through a portal he built, but returns to his original age of 12 years old.
54	2	"The Spaceship: Blue Typhoon" ("Cosmic Crisis"); Transliteration: "Uchūsen Burū Taifūn-gō" (Japanese: 宇宙船ブルータイフーン号)	Hideki Hiroshima	Kiyoko Yoshimura	Masanori Mizuhara	March 26, 2020	March 12, 2005 (France) September 17, 2005 (US)
After learning that Cosmo has come to Sonic's planet in search of him, in order to recover the Planet Eggs of various planets from the Metarex, Sonic and his friends decide to leave for space in a spaceship. However, while the spaceship is under construction, another Metarex soldier attacks and they use the main cannon "Sonic Driver," which uses Sonic as a cannonball, to vanquish it.
55	3	"The Water Planet, Hydo" ("H2 Whoa"); Transliteration: "Mizu no wakusei Haidō" (Japanese: 水の惑星ハイドー)	Masami Furukawa	Hiro Masaki	Seiji Okuda	March 27, 2020	March 13, 2005 (France) September 24, 2005 (US)
The spaceship, the Blue Typhoon, arrives on Hydo, a planet that has become a water planet after its Planet Egg was stolen. Chris and Sonic board the landing craft, but Sonic is kidnapped by the Metarex and Chris attempts to save him.
56	4	"Dr. Eggman Joins the War!" ("An Enemy In Need"); Transliteration: "Dokutā Egguman sansen!" (Japanese: Dr.エッグマン参戦！)	Takuo Suzuki	Hiro Masaki	Masanori Mizuhara	March 31, 2020	March 14, 2005 (France) October 1, 2005 (US)
While the people of Planet Hydo are thankful after the defeat of the Metarex, Eggman tries to trick Knuckles into getting the Chaos Emerald, but a frog Metarex appears and swallows the Chaos Emerald.
57	5	"The Battle at the Ice Palace!" ("A Chilling Discovery"); Transliteration: "Aisu paresu no tatakai!" (Japanese: アイスパレスの戦い！)	Kazunori Tanahashi	Masahiko Shiraishi	Seiji Okuda	April 1, 2020	March 15, 2005 (France) October 8, 2005 (US)
After arriving at Breezer, a blizzard planet, Sonic and his friends search for the Chaos Emeralds and arrive at the Ice Palace, where the Metarex soldiers are doing research.
58	6	"The Girls' Jungle Trap" ("Desperately Seeking Sonic"); Transliteration: "Otome no janguru torappu" (Japanese: 乙女のジャングルトラップ)	Nana Harada	Kiyoko Yoshimura	Seiji Okuda	April 2, 2020	March 16, 2005 (France) October 15, 2005 (US)
Sonic and his friends arrive at a jungle planet and defeat the Metarex with Sonic Driver, but Sonic is sent elsewhere with the force of the attack. As Amy, Cream, and Cosmo search for Sonic, the Metarex King Ape attacks them.
59	7	"The Chaotix Go To Outer Space" ("Galactic Gumshoes"); Transliteration: "Kaotikusu, uchū e iku" (Japanese: カオティクス、宇宙へ行く)	Hideki Hiroshima	Yoshio Urasawa	Masanori Mizuhara	April 3, 2020	March 17, 2005 (France) October 22, 2005 (US)
The Chaotix Detectives receive a request from Vanilla to deliver the various items sent from Earth via the portal to the Blue Typhoon. They arrive in space by spaceship, but are attacked.
60	8	"Shadow's Rebirth" ("Trick Sand"); Transliteration: "Shadō ribāsu" (Japanese: シャドウ・リバース)	Masami Furukawa	Masahiko Shiraishi	Seiji Okuda	April 6, 2020	March 18, 2005 (France) October 29, 2005 (US)
The Blue Typhoon arrives at Hobidon, a dead planet, and they search for the Chaos Emeralds amidst the wreckage and ruins of a colony, but the ruins are actually the transformable Metarex Deserd. Sonic struggles to fight Deserd until Shadow returns to aid him.
61	9	"The Metarex Battleship Attacks!" ("Ship of Doom"); Transliteration: "Metarekkusu senkan shūrai!" (Japanese: メタレックス戦艦襲来！)	Takuo Suzuki	Hiro Masaki	Masanori Mizuhara	April 7, 2020	March 19, 2005 (France) November 5, 2005 (US)
Metarex Hellship, which previously attacked Cosmo's immigrant ship, attacks the Crimson Egg and the Blue Typhoon.
62	10	"The Secret of the Underground Canyon" ("An Underground Odyssey"); Transliteration: "Chika keikoku no himitsu" (Japanese: 地下渓谷の秘密)	Mitsutaka Noshitani	Kiyoko Yoshimura	Toshihiko Masuda	April 8, 2020	March 20, 2005 (France) November 12, 2005 (US)
Tails and Cosmo, separated from Sonic and his friends on the planet Alabasta, find a facility in a cave where the Metarex are making copies of the Chaos Emeralds, and are pursued by the Metarex Viper.
63	11	"The Space Fortress, Metal Plant" ("Station Break-In"); Transliteration: "Uchū yōsai Metaru Puranto" (Japanese: 宇宙要塞メタルプラント)	Nana Harada	Hiro Masaki	Toshiki Hirano	April 9, 2020	March 21, 2005 (France) November 19, 2005 (US)
After learning that the two remaining Chaos Emeralds, the Blue and Green Emeralds, are inside the Metarex's fortress, Sonic and Eggman team up to break into the fortress, where they discover the Emeralds and a Planet Egg.
64	12	"Clash! Sonic vs. Shadow" ("A Metarex Melée"); Transliteration: "Gekitotsu! Sonikku vs Shadō" (Japanese: 激突！ソニックvsシャドウ)	Hideki Hiroshima	Kiyoko Yoshimura	Seiji Okuda	April 10, 2020	March 23, 2005 (France) November 26, 2005 (US)
Attempting to escape from the fortress, Sonic and his friends are ambushed by soldiers of a Metarex army led by Dark Oak. Sonic tries to escape, but is confronted by Shadow over the Chaos Emeralds.
65	13	"The Chaotix's Electric Shock Love Plan" ("Mission: Match Up"); Transliteration: "Kaotikusu dengeki raburabu daisakusen" (Japanese: カオティクス電撃ラブラブ大作戦)	Masami Furukawa	Masahiko Shiraishi	Masanori Mizuhara	April 13, 2020	April 5, 2005 (France) December 3, 2005 (US)
The Chaotix Detectives visit the Blue Typhoon; after seeing Tails and Cosmo chatting, Vector believes that Tails is in love with Cosmo and devises a plan to encourage him.
66	14	"Cross the Galactic Corridor!" ("Clash in the Cloister"); Transliteration: "Ginga kairō o watare!" (Japanese: 銀河回廊をわたれ！)	Kazuo Nogami	Hiro Masaki	Seiji Okuda	April 14, 2020	April 6, 2005 (France) February 4, 2006 (US)
The Blue Typhoon enters the galactic corridor, but are impeded by cosmic dust that has blown into the interior and attacked by Yellow Zelkova, the most powerful of the four Metarex bosses.
67	15	"The Black Trap" ("Teasing Time"/"Testing Time"); Transliteration: "Burakku torappu" (Japanese: ブラック・トラップ)	Hajime Kamegaki	Yoshio Urasawa	Hajime Kamegaki	April 15, 2020	April 7, 2005 (France) February 11, 2006 (US)
Detecting a massive Chaos Emerald signature from an asteroid, the Blue Typhoon heads there and finds an old factory. Inside, they find a Chaos Emerald production plant and Black Narcissus, one of the four Metarex bosses, appears.
68	16	"Above a Destroyed Planet" ("A Revolutionary Tale"); Transliteration: "Kowareta hoshi no ue de" (Japanese: こわれた星の上で)	Mitsutaka Noshitani	Kiyoko Yoshimura	Toshiki Hirano	April 16, 2020	April 8, 2005 (France) February 18, 2006 (US)
Molly, a young girl from the planet Cascade, fights against the Metarex to restore the planet. She becomes interested in Shadow, who is as strong as the legendary hero Black Wind, and they, along with Rouge, follow the signature of a Chaos Emerald to Cascade's mining site.: This is the second and final episode where Sonic and his friends are not present, the first being "The Adventures of Knuckles and Hawk", and the only episode of Season 3 without Cosmo.
69	17	"Please, Marmolim!" ("The Planet of Misfortune"); Transliteration: "Onegai Marumorin!" (Japanese: お願いマルモリン！)	Hideki Hiroshima	Kiyoko Yoshimura	Seiji Okuda	April 17, 2020	April 9, 2005 (France) February 25, 2006 (US)
The Blue Typhoon, with Chris aboard, encounters the three Marmolims, Momo, Lue, and Lylem, who have a Chaos Emerald, and Sonic and his team are forced to return their ship to their home planet in exchange for the Chaos Emerald.
70	18	"The Eggman Fleet Appears!" ("Terror on the Typhoon"); Transliteration: "Egguman kantai arawaru!" (Japanese: エッグマン艦隊現る！)	Masami Furukawa	Masahiko Shiraishi	Masanori Mizuhara	April 20, 2020	April 10, 2005 (France) March 4, 2006 (US)
Sonic rescues a mysterious spaceship from the Metarex, piloted by Decoe. After the Metarex's fleet warps out, they learn that the Metarex and Eggman have teamed up.
71	19	"Café Chaotix" ("Hedgehog Hunt"); Transliteration: "Kafe Kaotikusu" (Japanese: カフェ・カオティクス)	Takuo Suzuki	Hiro Masaki	Seiji Okuda	April 21, 2020	April 11, 2005 (France) March 11, 2006 (US)
The Chaotix Detectives, running a café on a planet, encounter Eggman, who has been appointed as one of the four Metarex bosses.
72	20	"The True Form of the Metarex?!" ("Zelkova Strikes Back"); Transliteration: "Metarekkusu no shōtai!?" (Japanese: メタレックスの正体！？)	Mitsutaka Noshitani	Kiyoko Yoshimura	Seiji Okuda	April 22, 2020	April 12, 2005 (France) March 18, 2006 (US)
Pursued by the Metarex, the Blue Typhoon crash-lands on the planet Thunderbolt after a surprise attack by Yellow Zelkova, who is impervious to their attacks, and in the ensuing battle, Chris and Sonic are sent far away.
73	21	"Shadow, the Assassin!" ("The Cosmo Conspiracy"); Transliteration: "Ansatsusha Shadō!" (Japanese: 暗殺者シャドウ！)	Nana Harada	Masahiko Shiraishi	Nana Harada	April 23, 2020	April 13, 2005 (France) April 1, 2006 (US)
Shadow attacks the Blue Typhoon to kill Cosmo, pursuing her and Tails as they escape.
74	22	"The Lost Planet" ("Eye Spy"); Transliteration: "Rosuto puranetto" (Japanese: ロスト・プラネット)	Hideki Hiroshima	Kiyoko Yoshimura	Masanori Mizuhara	April 24, 2020	April 14, 2005 (France) April 8, 2006 (US)
Sonic and his friends learn that Dark Oak has been using Cosmo as a spy for the Metarex, but vow to fight alongside her even after she tries to leave.
75	23	"The Day of the Forestations" ("Agent of Mischief"); Transliteration: "Shinka no hi" (Japanese: 森化の日)	Masami Furukawa	Masahiko Shiraishi	Seiji Okuda	April 27, 2020	April 15, 2005 (France) April 15, 2006 (US)
The Blue Typhoon takes off from the planet Green Gate and heads for coordinates 000, the planet Aquarius, which requires the Chaos Emeralds and a giant Planet Egg. The final battle with the Metarex armada is about to begin.
76	24	"Decisive Battle! Dark Oak" ("The Light in the Darkness"); Transliteration: "Kessen! Dāku Ōku" (Japanese: 決戦！ダーク・オーク)	Yutaka Saitō	Kiyoko Yoshimura	Seiji Okuda	April 28, 2020	April 16, 2005 (France) April 22, 2006 (US)
Chris and his team plan to use the Sonic Driver to strike the Master Emerald's energy into the Chaos Emerald, while Shadow and the Chaotix push back the Final Mova's attack. During the battle, Eggman tells Chris a shocking revelation.
77	25	"What I Can Do For You" ("A Fearless Friend"); Transliteration: "Kimi no tame ni dekiru koto" (Japanese: 君のためにできること)	Mitsutaka Noshitani	Kiyoko Yoshimura	Masanori Mizuhara	April 29, 2020	April 17, 2005 (France) April 29, 2006 (US)
The Final Mova becomes a giant nut, and in response to Cosmo's prayer, the Chaos Emeralds regain their power. Transforming into Super Sonic and Super Shadow, Sonic and Shadow's combined power breaks through the nut's outer contour and destroys it.
78	26	"The Place Where Planets Are Born" ("So Long, Sonic"); Transliteration: "Hoshi no umareru tokoro" (Japanese: 星の生まれるところ)	Hajime Kamegaki	Kiyoko Yoshimura	Hajime Kamegaki	April 30, 2020	April 18, 2005 (France) May 6, 2006 (US)
Following the battle, Chris, who has given up on returning to Earth because there is no way of restoring the Master Emerald, receives an envelope from Eggman containing a ticket labeled "one-way ticket to Earth.": This is the series finale.

== Theme songs ==
=== Japan ===
Opening

1. "Sonic Drive"
  - April 6, 2003 – March 28, 2004 and March 25, 2020 – April 30, 2020
  - Lyricist: Takeshi Aida
  - Composer / Arranger: Cher Watanabe
  - Singers: Hironobu Kageyama and Hideaki Takatori
  - Episodes: 1–78

Endings

1. "Fu-tu-re" (ミ・ラ・イ, Mi-ra-i)
  - April 6, 2003 – June 29, 2003
  - Lyricist / Composer / Arranger: Kazuyoshi Baba
  - Singers: Run&Gun
  - Episodes: 1–13
2. "Shining Road" (光る道, Hikaru michi)
  - July 6, 2003 – December 28, 2003 and March 25, 2020 – April 30, 2020
  - Lyricist: Shun Taguchi
  - Composer / Arranger: Masataka Matsutoya
  - Singer: Aya Hiroshige
  - Episodes: 14–39 and 53–78
3. "T.O.P."
  - January 4, 2004 – March 28, 2004
  - Lyricists / Singers: KP
  - Composer / Arranger: URU
  - Episodes: 40–52

=== United States ===
Opening

1. "Gotta Go Fast"
  - August 23, 2003 – May 6, 2006
  - By Norman Grossfeld and Russell Velazquez
  - Episodes: 1–78

Ending

1. "Gotta Go Fast" (shortened version)
  - August 23, 2003 – May 6, 2006
  - By Norman Grossfeld and Russell Velazquez

=== PAL regions ===
Opening

1. "Sonic X"
  - August 23, 2003 – May 6, 2006
  - Episodes: 1–78

For the ending, PAL region broadcasts use the same melody of the American ending theme, albeit instrumental and with an adjusted pitch and speed. However, UK broadcasts retain the vocals.

=== South Korea ===
South Korea has the same melody of the Japanese opening theme and the first ending theme, with the lyrics translated into Korean.

=== Italy ===
"Sonic" (Episodes 1–78)

=== France ===
The French dubbing has the same melody of the Japanese opening theme, but it is adapted into French lyrics instead. Endings are instrumental.

== Home video releases ==
=== Japan ===
A total of 13 DVD and VHS volume compilations was released by Victor Entertainment and Universal Music. "Hi-Spec" editions of volumes 1–10 have also been released, which include bonus features and 5.1 audio.

VHS/DVD Name	Episodes	Release Date
ソニックX Vol.1	1–5	July 23, 2003
ソニックX Vol.2	6–9	August 21, 2003
ソニックX Vol.3	10–13	September 26, 2003
ソニックX Vol.4	14–17	October 22, 2003
ソニックX Vol.5	18–21	November 21, 2003
ソニックX Vol.6	22–25	December 17, 2003
ソニックX Vol.7	26–29	January 21, 2004
ソニックX Vol.8	30–33	February 21, 2004
ソニックX Vol.9	34–36	March 24, 2004
ソニックX Vol.10	37–39	April 21, 2004
ソニックX Vol.11	40–43	May 21, 2004
ソニックX Vol.12	44–47	June 23, 2004
ソニックX Vol.13	48–52	July 21, 2004

=== United States ===
==== VHS/DVD ====
Funimation released episodes 1–52 in 10 single-disc releases, as well as part of the series in VHS:

VHS/DVD name	Episodes	Release date	Note
Sonic X: Vol. 1: A Super Sonic Hero	1. "Chaos Control Freaks"; 2. "Sonic to the Rescue"; 3. "Missile Wrist Rampage"; 27. "Pure Chaos"	June 1, 2004	A Super Sonic Hero was also released on a Game Boy Advance Video Pak, but only contains the first two episodes.
Sonic X: Vol. 2: The Chaos Factor	4. "Chaos Emerald Chaos"; 5. "Cracking Knuckles"; 6. "Techno-Teacher"; 7. "Party Hardly"	June 1, 2004	
Sonic X: Vol. 3: Satellite Swindle	8. "Satellite Swindle"; 9. "The Last Resort"; 10. "Unfair Ball"; 11. "Fly Spy"	October 12, 2004	
Sonic X: Vol. 4: Beating Eggman	12. "Beating Eggman (Part 1)"; 13. "Beating Eggman (Part 2)"; 14. "That's What Friends are For"; 15. "Skirmish in the Sky"; 16. "Depths of Danger"	December 7, 2004	
Sonic X: Vol. 5: Sonic's Scream Test	17. "The Adventures of Knuckles and Hawk"; 18. "The Dam Scam"; 19. "Sonic's Scream Test"; 20. "Cruise Blues"; 21. "Fast Friends"	January 25, 2005	It is the last Sonic the Hedgehog content of any media to be released on VHS.
Sonic X: Vol. 6: Countdown to Chaos	22. "Little Chaos Lost"; 23. "Emerald Anniversary"; 24. "How to Catch a Hedgehog"; 25. "A Dastardly Deed"; 26. "Countdown to Chaos"	April 12, 2005	
Sonic X: Vol. 7: Revenge of the Robot	28. "A Chaotic Day"; 29. "A Robot Rebels"; 30. "Heads Up, Tails!"; 31. "Revenge of the Robot"; 32. "Flood Fight"	June 14, 2005	Episode 27 isn't included due to have been part of Volume 1.
Sonic X: Vol. 8: Project Shadow	33. "Project: Shadow"; 34. "Shadow Knows"; 35. "Sonic's Big Break"; 36. "Shadow World"; 37. "Robotnik's Revenge"; 38. "Showdown in Space"	November 15, 2005	
Sonic X: Vol. 9: Into the Darkness	39. "Defective Detectives"; 40. "Sunblock Solution"; 41. "Eggman for President"; 42. "A Date to Forget"; 43. "Mean Machines"; 44. "Sewer Search"	February 7, 2006	
Sonic X: Vol. 10: The Beginning of the End	45. "Prize Fight"; 46. "A Wild Win"; 47. "Map of Mayhem"; 48. "The Volcanic Venture"; 49. "The Beginning of the End"; 50. "Running out of Time"; 51. "Friends 'Till the End"; 52. "A New Start"	May 16, 2006	

The episodes were re-released in "Saga" sets:

DVD Name	Episodes	Release Date
Sonic X: New World Saga	1. "Chaos Control Freaks"; 2. "Sonic to the Rescue"; 3. "Missile Wrist Rampage"; 4. "Chaos Emerald Chaos"; 5. "Cracking Knuckles"; 6. "Techno-Teacher"; 7. "Party Hardly"; 8. "Satellite Swindle"; 9. "The Last Resort"; 10. "Unfair Ball"; 11. "Fly Spy"; 12. "Beating Eggman (Part 1)"; 13. "Beating Eggman (Part 2)"	November 13, 2007
Sonic X: Chaos Emerald Chaos	14. "That's What Friends are For"; 15. "Skirmish in the Sky"; 16. "Depths of Danger"; 17. "The Adventures of Knuckles and Hawk"; 18. "The Dam Scam"; 19. "Sonic's Scream Test"; 20. "Cruise Blues"; 21. "Fast Friends"; 22. "Little Chaos Lost"; 23. "Emerald Anniversary"; 24. "How to Catch a Hedgehog"; 25. "A Dastardly Deed"; 26. "Countdown to Chaos"	May 20, 2008
Sonic X: Chaos & Shadow Sagas	27. "Pure Chaos"; 28. "A Chaotic Day"; 29. "A Robot Rebels"; 30. "Heads Up, Tails!"; 31. "Revenge of the Robot"; 32. "Flood Fight"; 33. "Project: Shadow"; 34. "Shadow Knows"; 35. "Sonic's Big Break"; 36. "Shadow World"; 37. "Robotnik's Revenge"; 38. "Showdown in Space"	September 9, 2008; September 23, 2008
Sonic X: The Egg Moon, Emerl & Homebound Sagas	39. "Defective Detectives"; 40. "Sunblock Solution"; 41. "Eggman for President"; 42. "A Date to Forget"; 43. "Mean Machines"; 44. "Sewer Search"; 45. "Prize Fight"; 46. "A Wild Win"; 47. "Map of Mayhem"; 48. "The Volcanic Venture"; 49. "The Beginning of the End"; 50. "Running out of Time"; 51. "Friends 'Till the End"; 52. "A New Start"	September 22, 2009

Episodes 53–78 made their way to the U.S. in two 13-episode box sets:

DVD Name	Episodes	Release Date
Sonic X: The Complete 5th Season	53. "A Cosmic Call"; 54. "Cosmic Crisis"; 55. "H2 Whoa"; 56. "An Enemy in Need"; 57. "A Chilling Discovery"; 58. "Desperately Seeking Sonic"; 59. "Galactic Gumshoes"; 60. "Trick Sand"; 61. "Ship of Doom"; 62. "An Underground Odyssey"; 63. "Station Break-In"; 64. "A Metarex Melee"; 65. "Mission: Match-Up"	September 12, 2006; October 31, 2006
Sonic X: So Long, Sonic	66. "Clash in the Cloister"; 67. "Teasing Time/Testing Time"; 68. "A Revolutionary Tale"; 69. "The Planet of Misfortune"; 70. "Terror on the Typhoon"; 71. "Hedgehog Hunt"; 72. "Zelkova Strikes Back"; 73. "The Cosmo Conspiracy"; 74. "Eye Spy"; 75. "Agent of Mischief"; 76. "The Light in the Darkness"; 77. "A Fearless Friend"; 78. "So Long, Sonic"	February 13, 2007

DVD Name	Episodes	Release Date
Sonic X: Collection 1	1–52	November 4, 2016
Sonic X: Collection 2	53–78	December 6, 2016

==== Blu-ray ====
Blu-ray Name	Episodes	Release Date
Sonic X: The Complete Series English Dub	1–78	May 28, 2019
Sonic X: The Complete Series Japanese Sub	1–78	April 25, 2023

=== United Kingdom ===
UK DVD

Warner Home Video and Jetix Consumer Products released only 4 volumes with episodes from 1 to 8.

- Volume 1 – Episode 1–2 ("Chaos Control Freaks" and "Sonic to the Rescue")
- Volume 2 – Episode 3–4 ("Missile Wrist Rampage" and "Chaos Emerald Chaos")
- Volume 3 – Episode 5–6 ("Cracking Knuckles" and "Techno-Teacher")
- Volume 4 – Episode 7–8 ("Party Hardly" and "Satellite Swindle")

=== Australia ===
In Australia, 17 volumes of the first series were released by MRA Entertainment in 2005–2006, which featured three episodes per disc.
