= Goldish =

Goldish is a surname. Notable people with the surname include:

- Meish Goldish (21st century), American children's writer
- Suzanne Goldish (21st century), American voice actress

== See also ==
- Shades of gold
