= Sam Speed =

Sam Speed may refer to:

- Sam Speed, a book by Batem
- Sam Speed, a character from Sonic X; see List of Sonic X episodes
- Sam Speed, a character from The Catherine Tate Show; see List of The Catherine Tate Show characters and sketches

== See also ==
- Samuel Speed, the last British convict sentenced to transportation; see Convicts in Australia
