= Musashi Gundoh =

Japanese anime television series

MUSASHI -GUN道- (Musashi -Gandō-)
- Created by: Monkey Punch
- Anime television series
- Directed by: Yūki Kinoshita
- Produced by: Nobuyuki Sugaya
- Written by: Naoyuki Sakai
- Music by: Norio Ishiguro
- Studio: ACC Production
- Original network: BS-i, Animax
- Original run: April 9, 2006 – October 29, 2006
- Episodes: 26

Musashi Gundoh (MUSASHI -GUN道-, Musashi -Gandō-; Musashi – Way of the Gun-) is a Japanese anime television series, based on an unused story by Monkey Punch. It premiered in Japan on the satellite station BS-i on April 9, 2006, and was also set to be broadcast across Japan by the anime satellite television network Animax from October 2006. It is also legally distributed over the Internet by GyaO from May 13, 2006. According to the producer, there were originally plans to broadcast the anime overseas, but they were scrapped due to poor reception of the anime.

Produced on a low budget, the series has been infamous for poor animation, and has attracted a cult following for this reason. It uses uncropped live photos for backgrounds, and its sound effects are completely out of sync with the animation. It is also the directorial debut for animator Yūki Kinoshita, who previously worked as a technical animation director, storyboard artist and key animator.

== Overview ==
Musashi Gundoh is set in a fictional feudal era of Japan, where the Toyotomi Shogunate (instead of Tokugawa) governs the nation. The anime tells the story of Musashi, a young practitioner of "gundoh" (GUN道, gandō), a martial art involving the use of guns. The series deals with Musashi's battles against a group of monsters called "Ayakashi".

=== Quality issues ===
In 2006, Japan's televised anime market was severely oversaturated, at the breaking point of an anime bubble which had also hit America and Europe. Musashi was one of over 60 new shows airing during its season. The plot relies on many action scenes, which require a large amount of animation, and the direction of these scenes attempts to somehow mix complex traditional swordfight imagery with gunplay. However, due to the chronic shortage of human resources and budgets for the production, the animation issues became apparent on-screen, and soon viewers began to pay more attention to the degrading drawing quality and nonsensical settings than to the content of the plot. For this series, both the in-betweens and key animation were ordered from overseas, mainly from China, which was agreed upon in advance by the production team, and there were no sufficient meetings with the director and other domestic staff. Normally, production is finished within a week or two, and if the quality is still not good enough, it can be reworked or sent to the video editing process. However, in the production environment of Musashi Gundoh, the footage ordered from overseas was delivered to the director the day before it was to be broadcast for video editing, and there was no time to make corrections to the poor footage, so episodes were broadcast as is.

Yūki Kinoshita, the director, was not attempting to create a bad anime. He stated about the reaction of the viewers, "At first I was angry at the ridicule, but in the end, the viewers' voices encouraged me to work hard even in an environment that made me want to run away." He also said, "The degradation of the drawings in this anime could have recurred elsewhere. The fundamental problem is that there is too much being produced in the entire animation industry." In addition, when the DVDs were about to release, he said that he wanted to make as many corrections as possible so that his power would not be underestimated, but in the end, only the uncorrected versions were released.

== Characters ==
=== Musashi side ===
Musashi Miyamoto (ミヤモト ムサシ, Miyamoto Musashi) (Voiced by: Daisuke Namikawa (浪川大輔, Namikawa Daisuke))

He fights against the Ayakashi using two guns. He practices Gundoh in "ma' own style". His character is based on Miyamoto Musashi (宮本武蔵, Miyamoto Musashi), a legendary swordsman.

His notable line: "Wow, it's dazzling!" (うおっまぶしっ!, Uo' mabushi'!)

In episode 2, Musashi scores a direct hit on an enemy, but it has no effect. After that, he abruptly shouts the aforementioned line. The line was not preceded by any bright scenes whatsoever, so viewers were left wondering why he said it with no provocation.

Ronin (ロウニン, Rōnin) (Voiced by: Jin Horikawa (堀川仁, Horikawa Jin))

A master swordsman who has special swords called Nenken and Meiretsu-ken (meanings unknown). He is Musashi's trusted partner. His name is probably derived from ronin (浪人, rōnin), meaning "a masterless samurai".

Ninja-Taro (ニンジャ太郎, Ninja-Tarō) (Voiced by: Yu Kobayashi (小林ゆう, Kobayashi Yū))

A clumsy ninja boy who claims to be "Musashi's first disciple" or "the ninja of ninjas".

Priest Takuan (タクアン和尚, Takuan Oshō) (Voiced by: Soichiro Tanaka (田中総一郎, Tanaka Sōichirō))

A priest in Daitoku-ji temple, as well as the pioneer of Gundoh martial arts. He is a very skilled Gundoh practitioner who can "fall fighting" from the sky. The BS-i website, as well as the DVD cover, describes him as a "worn-out old man", which doesn't quite seem to suit him. His character is based on Takuan Sōhō (沢庵宗彭, Takuan Sōhō), a priest in the real-life Daitokuji temple, who taught the real Musashi Miyamoto.

Desperado (デスペラード, Desuperādo) (Voiced by: Mayumi Yanagisawa (柳沢真由美, Yanagisawa Mayumi))

She is a sexy foreign woman who seeks revenge against Musashi for the murder of her father. Musashi, however, denies responsibility for the killing.

Kaguya (カグヤ) (Voiced by: Shiho Kawaragi (河原木志穂, Kawaragi Shiho))

She is the stepdaughter of Toyotomi Hideyoshi, and the princess of Osaka Castle. She is an incredibly strong woman who can fight against Ayakashi with her bare hands, even whilst airborne. It is rumored that her existence is the "trigger" that makes Musashi Gundoh's history different from our own. Her name possibly comes from Princess Kaguya (かぐや姫, Kaguya-Hime), a character from the Tale of the Bamboo Cutter, a well-known Japanese folk tale.

Dabi-no-ji (荼毘の字) (Voiced by: Kosei Hirota (廣田行生, Hirota Kōsei))

He is a master of karakuri, who owns a mechanical goods shop. He sells merchandise such as onmyo-dan (オンミョウダン, onmyōdan; possibly meaning "the bullet of onmyōdō"), special bullets that can harm the normally invulnerable Ayakashi. He can speak a little English, as demonstrated in his first meeting with Desperado. His pseudonym is "Dabi-no-ji" ("the Initial Dabi"), but his real name is Leonardo da Vinci. His character is based on the Italian maestro of the same name.

Sasuke Sarutobi (猿飛 佐助, Sarutobi Sasuke) (Voiced by: Yu Kobayashi (小林ゆう, Kobayashi Yū))

A "ninja monkey" bred by Dabi-no-ji. His true identity is that of Sasuke Sarutobi, one of the Sanada Ten Braves. He was transformed by the gramary of Yasha because he learned too much about Yasha's plans. Although he is called a "genius ninja", his skills are only equal to that of Ninja-Taro.

The Horse

Kaguya's horse, which is well-trained, and always appears to be calm. Even when his master is kidnapped by crows, he remains calm and faces front, directly towards the viewers. This horse is arguably the anime's most popular character.

=== Ayakashi side ===
Yasha (ヤシャ) (Voiced by: Rei Igarashi (五十嵐麗, Igarashi Rei))

He is the top of Ayakashi monsters. He knows the "true" unaltered history, and gives his power to Ryogen. Not much is known about him, including his sex. In a TV credit, his name is mistyped as Yashiya (ヤシヤ) more than once.

Ryogen (リョウゲン, Ryōgen) (Voiced by: Shiro Saito (斎藤志郎, Saitō Shirō))

He is actually Tokugawa Ieyasu. Yasha tells him that in the "true" history, Ryogen is the one who owns the shogunate. Knowing this, Ryogen tries to take over Toyotomi shogunate, using ayakashi's power.

Jijouda (ジジョウダ, Jijouda)(Voiced by: unknown)

Ayakashi that attacks into Daitkuji temple by the 2nd story. It is a size at the same level as a man; there are two to three corners, and there is a wing like the bat on the back. This wing flaps, and the gust is caused. The bullet can be driven back by using the barrier. The weak points were eyes, and it had been defeated before "OCHINAGARA TATAKAU (落ちながら戦う, Ochinagaratatakau)(fall fighting)" of the killer shot of the Priest Takuan.

Gandadarn (ガンダダーン, Gandadān)(Voiced by: Keiko Nemoto (根本圭子, Nemoto Keiko))

Ayakashi of spider that afflicts Musashi and Priest Takuan from the third story to the 5th story. It has spiders' legs, though it has the face of human. It can manipulate humans by vomiting a very strong Spider's Thread of magic from the mouth. Because the spider in the heavens has been changed into the Ayakashi, it is not possible to knock it down with arms for the Ayakashi. The model appeared in novel "Kumo no Ito (蜘蛛の糸, The Spider's Thread) " of the Ryūnosuke Akutagawa, and is a Spider's Thread that leads the kandata of the criminal who landed in hell to the paradise.

== See also ==
- Lost Universe
- MD Geist
- Gun Kata (Gundoh seems to be influenced by this fictional martial art.)
