= Sonic X =

2003 anime television series

Japanese name
- Kanji: ソニックX
Transcriptions
- Revised Hepburn: Sonikku Ekkusu
- Genre: Adventure; Science fiction
- Created by: Sega; Sonic Team
- Developed by: Hiro Masaki (#1–52); Kiyoko Yoshimura (#53–78)
- Directed by: Hajime Kamegaki
- Music by: Yoshihiro Ike
- Country of origin: Japan
- Original language: Japanese
- No. of episodes: 78 (Note: 52 episodes were produced during its run on TV Tokyo, while another batch of episodes, originally made for its international release was released via online streaming services.) (list of episodes)

Production
- Producers: Takeshi Sasamura (#1–52); Tadahito Matsumoto
- Production companies: TV Tokyo (#1–52); TMS Entertainment

Original release
- Network: TV Tokyo
- Release: April 6, 2003 – March 28, 2004
- Network: Jetix (France)
- Release: March 12 – April 18, 2005

Related
- Video game
- Developer: Torus Games
- Publisher: LeapFrog Enterprises
- Genre: Edutainment
- Platform: Leapster
- Released: 2007

Sonic X (Note: Japanese: ソニックX, Hepburn: Sonikku Ekkusu) is a Japanese anime television series based on Sega's Sonic the Hedgehog video game franchise. Produced by TMS Entertainment in partnership with Sonic Team, and directed by Hajime Kamegaki, Sonic X initially ran for 52 episodes, broadcasting on TV Tokyo and its TXN affiliates from April 2003 to March 2004. A further 26 episodes aired in North America, Europe, and the Middle East from 2005 to 2006. The American localization and broadcasting were handled by 4Kids Entertainment, which edited the series and created new music.

Sonic X follows Sonic the Hedgehog and his anthropomorphic friends, who accidentally teleport from their home planet to Earth during a battle with the mad scientist Doctor Eggman. Sonic is saved by a human boy, Chris Thorndyke, who helps him find his friends while repeatedly battling Eggman and his robots over the powerful Chaos Emeralds. The second season adapts the games Sonic Adventure (1998) and Sonic Adventure 2 (2001), and the third sees Sonic and his friends return with Chris to their world, where they enter outer space and fight an army of aliens.

Sonic X received mixed reviews, with criticism for its American localization and human characters, but praise for its story and faithfulness to the games. It was popular in the United States and France, though less so in Japan. Merchandise included an edutainment game for the Leapster, a trading card game, an American comic book published by Archie Comics, and toys. "Gotta go fast", the title of Sonic X's North American theme song, has endured as a Sonic catchphrase.

== Plot ==
=== Season 1 ===
Following a battle between Sonic the Hedgehog and Doctor Ivo "Eggman" Robotnik, a freak accident involving the seven Chaos Emeralds causes them to create "Chaos Control"—a powerful space-time force that causes both of them, along with Miles "Tails" Prower, Amy Rose, Cream the Rabbit and her pet Chao Cheese, Knuckles the Echidna, and Rouge the Bat, to be transported to a parallel universe containing Earth. Sonic and his friends find themselves landing in the city of Station Square, where they befriend twelve-year-old Christopher "Chris" Thorndyke—a lonely young boy, whose parents, movie-star mother Lindsay, and corporate executive father Nelson, tend to be absent with work, leaving him to be looked after by his grandfather Chuck, maid and chef Ella, and butler Mr. Tanaka.

Seeking to find the Chaos Emeralds to return home, the group battle against Eggman as he re-establishes himself on the planet in order to conquer it—aided by his bumbling robotic assistants Bocoe and Decoe, and his robotic courier Bokkun—with Rouge joining forces with the local government as a spy in order to help them defend against his attacks. In the course of battling Eggman, Sonic and the others befriend Chris' friends Danny, Frances and Helen, while slowly becoming celebrities thanks to their exploits, eventually being accepted amongst the human population, despite reservations of what might happen when the seven Chaos Emeralds are found.

=== Season 2 ===
Six months after the Chaos Emeralds are found and used by Sonic in his Super Sonic form, Chaos Control causes parts of their world to appear on Earth, including Angel Island and the Master Emerald, along with the arrival of Big the Cat and his pet Froggy. Whilst the group adapt to this and carry on with their lives, the government works to establish better defences in anticipation of another attack by Eggman, including the creation of a robotic army to counter the evil scientist's own creations. Much of the first half of this season is focused on adaptations of both Sonic Adventure and Sonic Adventure 2. After Station Square is rebuilt following the attack by Chaos, and Sonic and Shadow prevent Space Colony ARK from crashing into Earth, another Chaos Control event brings several inhabitants of Sonic's world to the planet, including the Chaotix Detective Agency—Vector the Crocodile, Espio the Chameleon, and Charmy Bee—and Vanilla, Cream's mother.

Eggman launches further schemes following the ARK incident, even when briefly captured by the government, whilst Sonic and his friends provide shelter for a robot named Emerl, who later goes on the rampage after coming into possession of a Chaos Emerald and forcing Cream to stop it (the story arc being a loose adaption of Sonic Battle). Eventually, after Eggman is thwarted from another world conquering scheme, the government learns that Earth and Sonic's world are slowly merging together, threatening to end time for them. As a result, Sonic, Eggman, and the others are forced to return home to prevent this, with Chris having to bravely allow his new friends to go, but with hope of seeing them again.

=== Season 3 ===
Six months after returning home, Sonic and his friends find themselves battling a new threat in the form of the Metarex—a race of villainous robots who seek to conquer the galaxy—aided by Cosmo, an anthropomorphic plant girl, who seeks to stop them. At the same time on Earth, where six years have passed, Chris finishes completing a portal device to take him to Sonic, arriving in his world to assist with his new found knowledge, despite the differences in time between the two worlds causing his body to revert back to that of his 12-year-old self. Departing their world, the group explore the galaxy for the Chaos Emeralds, after Sonic had to disperse them to avoid them being used by the Metarex. Alongside the group, Eggman also pursues after the Emeralds, accompanied by Rouge, and aided by Shadow, whom he had recovered following his supposed death.

Much of the journey sees Tails and Cosmo bonding, while Eggman secretly sides with the Metarex in order to uncover their plans, with the Chaotix Detective Agency also journeying into space and providing assistance where they can. The series reaches its conclusion with the group learning of the Metarex's origins, and both groups battling them to prevent them taking full control of the galaxy, culminating in both Cosmo and Shadow sacrificing themselves to achieve this.

== Characters ==
=== Protagonists ===
Sonic the Hedgehog
Voiced by: Jun'ichi Kanemaru (Japanese); Jason Griffith (English)
A fierce, confident, and heroic anthropomorphic blue hedgehog with a big attitude. Sonic possesses his signature super speed, allowing him to run faster than the speed of sound, and achieve extraordinary feats of sonic booms, being able to outrun cars. Sonic can also attack his enemies with his most powerful signature spin attack through sheer force of his will, or enhance it further by Tails' homemade Rings he mainly uses against enemies. Sonic is the fastest, most fearless, impatient, and care-free adventurer, having spent years using his powers to fight the forces of evil and to protect the innocent from the schemes of his arch-enemy, Dr. Eggman. However, after accidentally triggering Chaos Control, Sonic, alongside his friends—Miles "Tails" Prower, Knuckles the Echidna, Amy Rose, Cream the Rabbit, Cheese, including Eggman—are transported to the human world. There, Sonic is then rescued and aided by Chris Thorndyke. On this journey, Sonic, joined by Chris and his family and friends, continues the fight, defending the human world from Eggman's schemes while seeking the seven Chaos Emeralds, which are the key to returning him and his friends back to their world. He is mostly an isolationist and a little bit antisocial who wants "privacy", but still returns to help his friends defeat Eggman and put a stop to his evil plots, becoming a celebrity "superhero" by the human population. When using the Emeralds, Sonic transforms into a powerful golden godlike-form known as "Super Sonic", which amplifies his powers, including increasing his signature speed, and additional immense strength, flight, nigh-invulnerability, healing factor, and chaos-powers, allowing him to clash and defeat more powerful threats. Once they return to their world, Sonic and his friends declare war against a powerful alien-like robotic army called the Metarex, led by Dark Oak, to save their world and others.
Miles "Tails" Prower
Voiced by: Ryō Hirohashi (Japanese); Amy Palant (English)
A brilliant young anthropomorphic yellow two-tailed fox, and Sonic's best friend/sidekick. He can spin his twin tails to fly like a helicopter, and is a genius-level inventor, capable of creating machines and piloting flight vehicles, including his signature plane, the "Tornado", originally owned by Sonic. During battles, Tails typically supports Sonic and his friends with his inventions and piloting skills. After being transported to the human world, Tails befriends Chris' grandfather, Chuck Thorndyke, an expert scientist and inventor, who helps upgrade the Tornado into the advanced jet-plane-like "X-Tornado", allowing Tails to continue supporting Sonic and friends on their adventures.
Knuckles the Echidna
Voiced by: Nobutoshi Canna (Japanese); Dan Green (English)
A powerful and formidable anthropomorphic red echidna, Sonic's friendly rival, but also his second best friend, guardian of the Master Emerald, treasure hunter, and martial artist. Possessing immense super strength, Knuckles can smash obstacles, shatter rocks, and overpower foes. Despite his tough demeanor and occasional gullibility—he has been tricked by Eggman into doubting Sonic whom he clashes with—however the two of them have proven to be invaluable allies. Knuckles takes up the search for the seven Chaos Emeralds seriously, aiming to return to his world and Angel island to protect the Master Emerald as soon as possible.
Amy Rose
Voiced by: Taeko Kawata (Japanese); Lisa Ortiz (English)
An energetic and hotheaded but kind-hearted female anthropomorphic pink hedgehog who has a crush on Sonic. She wields her signature Piko Piko Hammer, capable of smashing obstacles and enemies with tremendous force. While she can be bossy and stubborn, Amy is devoted to protecting her friends and openly claims to be Sonic's girlfriend, often attempting to persuade him to take her out on a date.
Cream the Rabbit
Voiced by: Sayaka Aoki (Japanese); Rebecca Honig (English)
A sweet, well-mannered anthropomorphic peach-like rabbit who can fly by flapping her large ears. She is always accompanied by her pet Chao, Cheese, and is closest friends with Amy just as Tails was to Sonic. Unlike Sonic and his friends, Cream is less active in combat but is still capable of assisting her friends with her unique talents.
Cheese the Chao
Voiced by: Ryō Hirohashi (Japanese); Rebecca Honig (English)
A small floating light-blued Chao who is Cream's pet.
Christopher "Chris" Thorndyke
Voiced by: Sanae Kobayashi (young), Masakazu Morita (teenager) (Japanese); Suzanne Goldish (young), Michael Sinterniklaas (adult) (English)
A 12-year-old, wealthy but kind-hearted lonely human boy who lives in Thorndyke Mansion in Station Square. Chris rescues Sonic from drowning in a pool and helps him and his friends—Tails, Amy, Cream, and Cheese—throughout their adventures to stop Dr. Eggman's attempts of taking over the world whilst helping them find the seven Chaos Emeralds in order for them to return home. Like Tails, Chris looks up to Sonic as an older brother figure and will go to great lengths to aid his new friends, while being Sonic's closest human friend.

=== Supporting characters ===
Chuck Thorndyke
Voiced by: Bin Shimada (Japanese); Jerry Lobozzo (English)
An inventor and scientist who is Chris's grandfather, Nelson's father, and Lindsay and Sam's father-in-law. Similar to Tails and Dr. Eggman, he enjoys creating machines and researching new technologies. He helps Chris hide Sonic and his friends after their arrival and becomes close to Tails, working with him on inventions—including the X-Tornado—to help Sonic and his team stop Eggman's schemes.
Mr. Tanaka
Voiced by: Naoki Imamura (Japanese); Darren Dunstan (English)
The Thorndyke family's strict Japanese butler and an expert martial artist who also serves as their bodyguard. He eventually discovers that Sonic and his friends are being hidden in the mansion, but chooses to support Chris and Chuck in protecting them. As Sonic becomes recognized as a hero, Mr. Tanaka assists in locating the Chaos Emeralds and preventing Eggman's attempts to take over Earth.
Ella
Voiced by: Kujira (Japanese); Mike Pollock (English)
The Thorndyke family's cheerful Indian chef and housemaid. She discovers Sonic and his friends early on but quickly befriends them, especially Amy and Cream. Usually calm and kind, Ella becomes surprisingly fierce when angered.
Helen
Voiced by: Noriko Hidaka (young/teenager) (Japanese); Amy Birnbaum (young/teenager) (English)
One of Chris's closest friends and among the first humans to accept Sonic and his companions. Born with a condition that forces her to use a wheelchair, she remains optimistic, supportive, and adventurous.
Danny
Voiced by: Naomi Shindō (young/teenager) (Japanese); Rachael Lillis (young) Frank Frankson (English)
One of Chris's best friends, is along with Helen and Frances.
Frances
Voiced by: Yuka Shioyama (young/teenager) (Japanese); Kerry Williams (young/teenager) (English)
An adventurous girl and one of Chris's best friends.
Sam Speed/Sam Fair
Voiced by: Sōichirō Tanaka (Japanese); Frank Frankson (English)
The leader of the Speed Team, or the "S-Team," a special police unit of the Station Square Police Department (S.S.P.D.) that uses high-speed race cars. He is Chris's uncle, Lindsay's younger brother, Nelson's brother-in-law, and Chuck's son-in-law. Like Sonic, he is competitive and impatient. Though he shares a friendly rivalry with him over speed.
Nelson Thorndyke
Voiced by: Ken Yamaguchi (Japanese); Ted Lewis (English)
Chris's father, Lindsay's husband, Chuck's son, and Sam's brother-in-law. A wealthy and famous businessman, he is the president of Thorndyke Industries. Though often absorbed in work and distant, he cares deeply for his family and will risk everything to protect them.
Lindsay Thorndyke
Voiced by: Naomi Shindō (Japanese); Jennifer C. Johnson (English)
Chris's mother, Nelson's wife, Chuck's daughter-in-law, and Sam's older sister. Lindsay is a famous actress whose career keeps her traveling frequently. Despite her busy schedule, she is a loving mother and wife.
Mr. Stewart
Voiced by: Michio Nakao (Japanese); Andrew Rannells (English)
Chris's homeroom teacher at Station Square Elementary School, and secretly an undercover government agent tasked with monitoring Chris to determine whether he is hiding Sonic and his friends. After defying orders, he is reassigned but continues crossing paths with Sonic's group on later missions.
Scarlet Garcia
Voiced by: Yuka Shioyama (Japanese); Megan Hollingshead (English)
A respected ace news reporter for Station Square TV News, admired by journalists for her professionalism.
Rouge the Bat
Voiced by: Rumi Ochiai (Japanese); Kathleen Delaney (English)
A sassy anthropomorphic bat who is a skilled jewel thief and treasure hunter, often rivaling Knuckles. After being transported to the human world, she was caught in one of her thefts and roped into being a government agent to protect Earth while maintaining her personal interests.
Topaz
Voiced by: Yukari Hikida (Japanese); Kayzie Rogers (English)
A Guardian Units of the Nations (G.U.N.) agent who becomes Rouge's partner. Although she initially distrusts Rouge, the two eventually form a strong friendship. Their missions involve targeting Doctor Eggman, retrieving the Chaos Emeralds, and acting as liaisons between Sonic's group and the government.
President / Michael K. (Note: The English dub does not mention Michael K's name and just refers to him as the President)
Voiced by: Tomohisa Asō (Japanese); Ted Lewis (English)
The President of the United States. Initially wary of Sonic, his friends, and especially Dr. Eggman, he considers military action but changes his stance after learning that Sonic has repeatedly fought Eggman to protect the world. He recruits Rouge and military forces to form G.U.N. and help counter Eggman.
Christina Cooper
Voiced by: Kumiko Izumi (Japanese); Lisa Ortiz (English)
The presidential adviser to the President.
Shadow the Hedgehog
Voiced by: Kōji Yusa (Japanese); Jason Griffith (English)
An immortal, brooding, powerful anthropomorphic black-and-red striped hedgehog who resembles Sonic, who possesses speed and abilities beyond imagination. He possesses Chaos Control, allowing him to manipulate time and space, and is considered Sonic's arch-rival. Created by Professor Gerald Robotnik during Project Shadow as the "Ultimate Lifeform", he befriended Maria Robotnik before she was killed, leading to his imprisonment by G.U.N. for fifty years. Freed by Eggman, Shadow initially seeks vengeance on humanity but ultimately joins Sonic to save the world, nearly losing his life. Like Sonic, Shadow can use all seven Chaos Emeralds to transform into a powerful god-like form as "Super Shadow", when facing formidable foes, this form increases all of his abilities including Chaos Control. He later returns, helps save the universe, and eventually joins forces with Eggman, Rouge, and even Sonic's team during the war with the Metarex.
Vector the Crocodile
Voiced by: Kenta Miyake (Japanese); Jimmy Zoppi (English)
A strong anthropomorphic green crocodile from Sonic's world who can breathe fire and has detective expertise. He leads the Chaotix Detective Agency, alongside Espio the Chameleon and Charmy Bee.
Espio the Chameleon
Voiced by: Yūki Masuda (Japanese); David Wills (English)
A stealthy, ninja-like purple chameleon who can camouflage and is an expert martial artist. He is a dedicated member of the Chaotix Detective Agency.
Charmy Bee
Voiced by: Yōko Teppōzuka (Japanese); Amy Birnbaum (English)
A small, comedic, hyperactive yellow-and-black bee who can fly and sting enemies. As the youngest and most naïve member of the Chaotix, he often takes things literally and plays harmless tricks on his friends.
Big the Cat
Voiced by: Takashi Nagasako (Japanese); Oliver Wyman (English)
A large, gentle, easygoing anthropomorphic purple cat transported to Earth during the Chaos Control event. Though not very bright, he is kind-hearted and spends his time fishing with his best friend Froggy.
Froggy
Voiced by: Tomohisa Asō (Japanese); Amy Birnbaum (English)
Big's loyal green frog companion who also ended up on Earth due to Chaos Control.
Chaos
An ancient, immortal, and powerful water-like creature formed entirely of concentrated Chaos energy. It can change form with each Chaos Emerald it absorbs. Once the guardian of the Chao and the Master Emerald, Chaos was driven into a destructive rage after an attack by the Echidna Clan, but was sealed inside the Master Emerald by Tikal. Freed generations later by Eggman, Chaos eventually turns on him and attempts to destroy the world by transforming into a gigantic reptilic-monster constituted entirely of pure, water-like energy known as "Perfect Chaos" by using negative energy, derived from the seven Chaos Emeralds, but is ultimately defeated, calmed, and redeemed by Sonic, in his Super Sonic form using positive energy.
Tikal
Voiced by: Kaori Asoh (Japanese); Rebecca Honig (English)
An orange echidna spirit and the daughter of Chief Pachacamac of the Echidna Clan. She befriended the Chao colony and their guardian, Chaos. When Chaos went on a rampage after her father attempted to steal the Chaos Emeralds, Tikal sealed it inside the Master Emerald along with her own spirit. She is freed in the present day due to Eggman's plans and aids Sonic and his allies before leaving peacefully with Chaos once order is restored.
Cosmo
Voiced by: Etsuko Kozakura (Japanese); Amy Birnbaum (English)
A green, plant-like alien from the Green Gate, whose homeworld was destroyed by Dark Oak and the Metarex. She assists Sonic and his friends in stopping the Metarex from conquering galaxies and eventually becomes Tails' love interest. She sacrifices herself to help Sonic and his friends defeat Dark Oak and the Metarex for good to save the galaxy. At the series finale, Tails is shown caring for a green-like plant from a seed Sonic found after the war.

=== Antagonists ===
==== Eggman Empire ====
The Eggman Empire is an organization that is run by Doctor Eggman.

Doctor Eggman
Voiced by: Chikao Ohtsuka (Japanese); Mike Pollock (English)
A human mad scientist and Sonic's arch-enemy. Possessing genius-level intelligence with an IQ of 300, he is an expert inventor aiming to conquer the world and establish his Eggman Empire. Doctor Eggman is assisted by his hench-robots Decoe and Bocoe, and his messenger Bokkun, along with an army of ruthless robots and high-tech machines. After being transported to the human world, Eggman continues his conquest with his E-Series robots, seeking the Chaos Emeralds to achieve universal domination, only to be continuously thwarted by Sonic and his friends. He would eventually form a truce with Sonic and Company when they declare war on the Metarex.
Decoe
Voiced by: Ken Yamaguchi (Japanese); Andrew Rannells (English)
A yellow tall, humanoid assistant robot who works for Dr. Eggman, helping him achieve his goals of world domination alongside Bocoe.
Bocoe
Voiced by: Bin Shimada (Japanese); Darren Dunstan (English)
A grey grown-a short humanoid robot and Eggman's assistant, supporting his conquest plans alongside Decoe.
Bokkun
Voiced by: Yumiko Kobayashi (Japanese); Andrew Rannells (English)
A small, dark-blue robotic messenger known for his mischievous personality, mainly delivers Eggman's messages through small television bomb pranks to challenge Sonic and his friends.

==== Metarex ====
The Metarex are an army of robots and cyborgs that scour the galaxy for Planet Eggs.

Dark Oak/Lucas
Voiced by: Jouji Nakata (Dark Oak), Katsuyuki Konishi (Lucas) (Japanese); Matt Hoverman (Dark Oak/Lucas) (English)
A powerful leader of the Metarex. Known as Dark Oak, he was once known as Lucas, a member of Cosmo's species from the Green Gate homeworld. Once in love with Cosmo's mother Earthia, he becomes a formidable enemy to Sonic and his friends.
Pale Bayleaf
Voiced by: Jūrōta Kosugi (Japanese); Marc Diraison (English)
An insectoid-type member of the Metarex who is one of Dark Oak's four commanders. When fusing with Dark Oak and Black Narcissus to become Final Mova, he is killed by the Blue Typhoon crew.
Black Narcissus
Voiced by: Ken Narita (Japanese); David Wills (English)
An insectoid-headed member of the Metarex who is one of Dark Oak's four commanders. When fusing with Dark Oak and Black Narcissus to become Final Mova, he is killed by the Blue Typhoon crew.
Yellow Zelkova
Voiced by: Takeshi Watabe (Japanese); Ted Lewis (English)
A bulky member of the Metarex who is one of Dark Oak's four commanders. He was knocked into the lava pit by Knuckles and perished falling into the lava despite Knuckles trying to save him.
Red Pine
Voiced by: Hōchū Ōtsuka (Japanese); Jonathan Todd Ross (English)
A stocky member of the Metarex who is one of Dark Oak's four commanders. He and those onboard his spaceship perished when the spaceship was pulled into a wormhole.
Final Mova
A three-headed plant dragon who is the fusion of Dark Oak, Pale Bayleaf, and Black Narcissus through the Forestation Process. Final Mova was destroyed by the Blue Typhoon crew, Doctor Eggman, and their allies.

== History ==
=== Creation and development ===
This scene shows (clockwise from top left) Sonic, Tails, and two original major characters—Cosmo and Chris—in the typical outer-space setting of the third season.

The show was created by TMS Entertainment, the animation subsidiary of Sega Sammy Holdings. It was primarily influenced by other anime rather than work from the West, and was created for a Japanese audience. Yuji Naka, then the head of Sonic Team, filled in as executive producer, and Satoshi Hirayama designed all of the original characters, basing the designs on Yuji Uekawa's original concept. Most of the series consists of original content featuring new as well as established characters, but the second season is mostly based on the plots of Sonic Adventure, Sonic Adventure 2, Sonic Battle and little elements from Sonic Heroes. While traditionally animated, it includes non-outlined CGI elements for things such as Sonic's homing attack.

Two trailers for the series were produced. The first was developed before Cheese had been given a name in Sonic Advance 2 (2002); it referred to Cheese simply as "Chao". It was made up largely of footage that would later appear in the series' intro, but also of unused scenes featuring unique anthropomorphic people. Sega showed off the second, which was narrated in Japanese, at its booth at the World Hobby Fair video gaming event on February 19, 2003. It consisted mostly of scenes from the first few episodes, followed by introductions to the main characters. However, it also showed a still frame of a silver anthropomorphic hedgehog who never appeared in the series. Fans nicknamed the character "Nazo", based on the Japanese word for "mystery" (謎, nazo). Years later, on April 20, 2015, Sonic Team producer Takashi Iizuka clarified the character was simply Super Sonic in its early contour.

Several of the Japanese performers had voiced their characters in the games, but they were also given ample information about their characters' roles in the anime. Chris' voice actress Sanae Kobayashi was not sure she would be able to effectively communicate Chris' growth as a person owing to Sonic's presence, but found that a worthwhile goal. Chikao Ōtsuka, who voiced Eggman, found him a difficult character to play due to the tension in his voice and the desire to have children who watched the show recognize the character as a villain but not hate him.

Iizuka believed that Sonic X and its merchandise, along with the game Sonic Heroes, had helped expose the Sonic franchise to a new generation of potential gamers in 2003, and he dubbed it a "Sonic Year" as a result. More boldly, Naka hoped that Sonic X alone would cause the popularity of the Sonic series to skyrocket, as that of the Pokémon series did after its anime adaptation was first released.

=== Broadcast and localization ===
The show's American localization was handled by 4Kids Productions. The episodes were heavily edited for content and length; 4Kids has been described by Destructoid as being "infamous" among anime fans for this type of overzealous editing. 4Kids removed alcohol consumption, coarse language, instances of breaking the fourth wall, and numerous sexual scenes. Unlike some other series that 4Kids translated around the early to mid 2000s, such as Kirby: Right Back at Ya!, Sonic X suffered no full episodes being cut. Producer Michael Haigney personally disliked realistic violence in children's programs, but had not intended to make massive changes himself. Instead, he was bound by Fox Broadcasting Company's strict guidelines, which forbid content such as smoking and strong violence. In 2006, near the end of the show's American production, Haigney stated in an interview that he had never played a Sonic game, read the comics, or watched any of the previous Sonic animated series.

4Kids found new voice actors rather than using those from the games. 4Kids president Norman J. Grossfeld invited Jason Griffith and Mike Pollock to audition for Sonic and Eggman, having known them from their work on Ultimate Muscle and Kirby: Right Back at Ya! and chose him for his yelling and pitch-wavering talents; Pollock and Griffith also voiced Ella and Shadow. 4Kids allowed Pollock to make minor alterations to the dialogue when lines "[didn't] work for some reason." He recalled being given only short samples of Eggman's voice from the games—he was not told specifically which game—and brief descriptions of his characters' roles. The rest of the cast assumed their characters' voice roles after their auditions. Beginning with Shadow the Hedgehog, the cast of Sonic X would assume their respective voice roles in all Sonic games released between 2005 and 2010, at which point all the roles were recast with the exception of Mike Pollock as Eggman.

Sonic X aired in Japan on TV Tokyo's 8:30 a.m. time slot from April 6, 2003 to March 28, 2004. It consisted of three seasons, each of them 26 half-hour episodes long. The first two seasons were also syndicated by delay to a handful of stations outside of the reach of the TX Network: four JAITS member stations (Television Wakayama, Biwako Broadcasting, Nara Television and Gifu Broadcasting) and one station each of the four larger networks (Aomori Asahi Broadcasting (ANN), Nagasaki International Television), SBS (JNN) and Sendai Broadcasting (FNN)). In Japan, the third season was never aired on TV until 2020 or released on DVD, but was available through rental streaming services. 4Kids licensed the series in North America from the beginning, ShoPro Entertainment was also made a license holder in October 2003. It aired in North America on the FoxBox block of Fox channels.

On June 16, 2012, the bankrupt 4Kids sold its Sonic X license to Saban Brands's Kidsco Media Ventures. On April 29, 2013, Saban Brands's Vortexx would partner with Kabillion to add shows like Sonic X to the lineup. TMS Entertainment has since taken US rights, and in 2015, Discotek Media licensed the series alongside several other TMS properties for home media releases. In 2021, FilmRise was given the AVOD rights to 38 TMS Entertainment titles including Sonic X for US and Canada.

Outside North America and Asia, Jetix Europe (previously Fox Kids Europe) held the rights to the series, which the company acquired in August 2003. Buena Vista International Television handled distribution services while Jetix Europe handled all other television rights. The company's Jetix Consumer Products (JCP) subsidiary held consumer product and home media rights to the series in Pan-European, MENA, and Latin American territories.

For the 60th anniversary of TMS Entertainment, the company streamed a select number of episodes on its YouTube channel, available with the original Japanese audio with English subtitles, from August 5–9 and 12–16, 2024. TMS Entertainment handled rights to the series in Asian territories.

=== Home video ===
The series was released on DVD, in Japan, only seasons one and two were released, and their 52 episodes spanned 13 discs. From 2003 to 2009 in the United States, 4Kids Home Video and their exclusive distributor FUNimation Entertainment released VHS tapes (until 2005) and DVDs of the series in single-release volumes and later multi-disc boxsets. The first two to be released were "A Super Sonic Hero" and "The Chaos Factor," released on June 1, 2004. Another such volume released was "Project Shadow", released on November 15, 2005. It was released to tie in with the release of the game Shadow the Hedgehog, and covered the first arc that focused on Shadow (episodes 33–38).

Discotek Media released the 8-disc DVD set, "Sonic X Collection 1" in North America, which includes the English-dubbed seasons 1 and 2 (episodes 1–52) on November 22, 2016. They later released the 4-disc DVD set, "Sonic X Collection 2" in North America, which includes the English-dubbed Season 3 (episodes 53–78) on December 6, 2016.

On May 28, 2019, Discotek Media released a 2-disc Blu-ray set of the English dub of the series with all three seasons and seventy-eight episodes. Despite the upgraded format, the series is based on the original 4Kids beta tape, retaining a 480i resolution as opposed to the standard 1080p resolution on most Blu-rays. On April 25, 2023, Discotek released a subtitled Blu-ray release of the complete series in its original Japanese language. While remastered, the series is still presented in standard definition like the previous release.

=== Music ===
Yoshihiro Ike composed the score for the Japanese version of Sonic X. Its opening theme was "Sonic Drive", performed by Hironobu Kageyama and Hideaki Takatori. The series included three ending themes: "Mi-ra-i" (ミ・ラ・イ, Future) by Run&Gun for episodes 1–13, "Hikaru Michi" (光る道, Shining Road) by Aya Hiroshige for episodes 14–39 and again for episodes 53–78, and "T.O.P" by KP for episodes 40–52. Three songs by Off Course, "Kotoba ni Dekinai", "Midori no Hibi" and "Natsu no Hi", were featured as insert songs in the original broadcasts of episodes 26 and 52; these were replaced in subsequent broadcasts and home releases. Tracks from Sonic Adventure and Sonic Adventure 2 were used infrequently during some episodes, including Sonic Adventure 2 theme "Live & Learn" by Crush 40 in episode 38. A soundtrack titled Sonic X ~Original Sound Tracks~ was released in Japan on March 8, 2004, it consisted of 40 tracks of original music from the first two seasons.

4Kids musicians John Angier, Craig Marks, Joel Douek, Louis Cortelezzi, Manny Corallo, Matt McGuire, and Ralph Schuckett, known for their work on the Yu-Gi-Oh! franchise, composed a new background score for the North American release "for both artistic and commercial reasons." The North American opening and closing theme (also used as the closing theme in the European version), titled "Gotta Go Fast," was composed by Grossfeld and Russell Velazquez.

== Other media ==
Sonic X was extensively merchandised in various forms of media and other products. A Game Boy Advance Video Pak containing the first two episodes was released in May 2004. In October 2004, ShoPro licensed four manufacturers to create Sonic X merchandise, they variously produced items such as toys, bedding, beach towels, backpacks, stationery, and pajamas. Six Sonic X novels were published between 2005 and 2007: Aqua Planet, Dr. Eggman Goes to War, Battle at Ice Palace, and Desperately Seeking Sonic by Charlotte Fullerton, Meteor Shower Messenger by Paul Ruditis, and Spaceship Blue Typhoon by Diana G. Gallagher.

=== Comic series ===
Sonic X

Publication information
- Publisher: Archie Comics
- Publication date: September 18, 2005 – January 1, 2009
- No. of issues: 40

Creative team
- Written by: Ian Flynn, Joe Edkin
- Penciller: Tim Smith III
- Inker: Jim Amash
- Letterer: John Workman
- Colorist: Josh Ray
- Editor: Mike Pellerito

Archie Comics, which published Sonic the Hedgehog comics until 2017, started a Sonic X series in 2005. It was originally set to run for only four issues, but was extended to 40 issues due to high demand. The last issue was released on January 1, 2009, and led into the first arc of the Sonic Universe series. The comics were written by Ian Flynn, who also authored the main comic series. Some issues were published in Jetix Magazine in the United Kingdom, Italy and Poland.

While the comics are set during the Sonic X timeline, their plot is original. Eggman imprisons humans inside robots and tries to use them to kill the animals, but the animals destroy the robots. Eggman uses malicious Chao to destroy Station Square, but Tikal and Chaos arrive from the past, return the Chao to normal, and bring them back to the past. Soon, Sonic finds a machine in the desert and thinks nothing of it, but after fighting with Eggman in Paris and a bizarre world created by the doctor, Eggman reveals the desert machine was his and it begins to wreck Station Square. Sonic defeats it, but he is accused of working with Eggman, so he and Eggman are both locked up. Nelson bails Sonic out of jail, and he saves Cream and Chris from some ghosts.

Eggman enacts more malicious schemes based on holidays like Christmas, Valentine's Day and St. Patrick's Day. Afterwards, he temporarily fires Decoe and Bocoe and creates replacements, Dukow and Bukow, who kidnap Sonic and give him to an organization called S.O.N.I.C.X. Sonic escapes with ease, but S.O.N.I.C.X. repeatedly tries to ruin his reputation. Meanwhile, the animals take on Eggman in his various schemes—including becoming a wrestler and creating a circus—to keep the Emeralds from him. In the final issue, a crossover with the continuity of the main comic series, that continuity's Metal Sonic appears and allies with Eggman to defeat Sonic, but that continuity's version of Shadow steps in and warps himself and Metal Sonic to another dimension, leading into the events of the first issue of Sonic Universe.

=== Video games ===
In 2003, McDonald's packaged five different single-button dedicated console games, mostly based on various sports, with Happy Meals to promote Sonic X: two featuring Sonic and one each for Tails, Knuckles, and Shadow. Another Happy Meal game based on Big the Cat fishing arrived the following year.

In 2007, LeapFrog Enterprises released a Sonic X educational math game for its Leapster handheld game console. The game stars Sonic and Chris, who must rescue Tails, Amy, and Knuckles from Eggman. It is a fast-paced platform/action game in which Sonic runs and jumps through levels and destroys Eggman's robots along the way. Periodically, Sonic must answer math questions to continue. The game features three levels, each with its own math concepts: the city Station Square (sequencing, counting in increments); Angel Island, the home of the Master Emerald (addition), and Eggman's base (subtraction). There are also math-based minigames unrelated to the levels to supplement these skills.

=== Trading card game ===
Score Entertainment created a Sonic X collectible card game for two players released in 2005. Players battle for Chaos Emeralds, whoever gets three first wins. Each turn, both players lay out five cards face-down and flip over one at a time; whichever card has a lower number value is eliminated. Eliminating the other player's cards and combining the special abilities of one's own cards allows one to score rings; whichever player has the most rings at the end of the turn wins an Emerald. As the game does not emphasize collecting rare cards, a few booster packs are enough to build a competent deck. KidzWorld gave a positive review, praising its ease of learning, low cost, and inherent strategy, but also noting that it feels more like a generic card game with Sonic characters than like a wholly Sonic-based product.

== Reception ==
Sonic X received divided reviews. Many reviewers were critical of its American localization. Conrad Zimmerman of Destructoid cited Sonic X's "horrible localization" as a main reason for negativity. Tim Jones of THEM Anime gave the show two stars out of five and criticized the English voice acting: "It's really annoying how all the recent Sonic games use these untalented actors/actresses in their dubs, because they make the original English voices sound like award-winning performers." Other comments on the show's aesthetics were mostly positive. Staff of GamesRadar admitted, "At least the song fits. Can't imagine Sonic listening to Underground's wailing Meat Loaf light rock, but he'd definitely jam to Sonic X." Jones praised the rock music from Sonic Adventure 1 and 2, as well as the "pretty piano music" and "catchy" Japanese intro and outro themes. He also found the backgrounds "nice to look at" but did not like the use of CGI for Sonic's homing attack.

The human characters and, to a lesser extent, the animal ones were also criticized. Jones described Chris as "a dull, boring, uninspired character" and also described Tanaka and Ella as "bland" stereotypes of Japanese and African-Americans, respectively. Jones also criticized the presence of Amy and Big, but took particular issue to the show's portrayal of Sonic, which he summarized as: "'I'm gonna run around downtown until something exciting happens and use a stinking Ring to defeat my enemies'". GamesRadar bemoaned both the "piss-poor Adventure characters" and the original human ones. In contrast, writer Gaz Plant of NintendoLife opined that "one of the key successes" of the series was its incorporation of numerous characters from the games, including lesser-used ones like Big and the Chaotix. Fans were divided on the merit of the Thorndykes.

The show was praised for its faithfulness to the games. Famitsu offered a uniformly positive review before the first episode broadcast in 2003, commending the skillful transition of the games' speed and style to animation, and expected the series to continue to grow more interesting. Plant stated that "where Sonic X truly succeeded was in its retelling of iconic stories." Independent of the characters involved, GamesRadar appreciated the idea of following "Sonic's core concept." The original storylines were also praised. Amidst his criticism of most of the show, Jones praised the first episode in general, especially its humor. Plant acclaimed the character development that built on the stories of the original games, especially Sonic and Amy's relationship and the Chaotix's newfound viability as comedy devices. Concurrently, he found the show "surprisingly touching," particularly in its "emotional" final climax, and favorably compared the space exploration of season three to Star Trek. Famitsu's first preview called the story profound (重厚, jūkō). Dave Trumbore of Collider noted that while the series' pacing remains much faster than the 1990s series, the introduction of multiple Earth-based human factions slowed it somewhat.

Common Sense Media gave it three stars out of five and, while not commenting further on its quality, stated that it was appropriate for grade-school children but that some violent scenes were inadvisable for younger viewers. A second Famitsu review from later in 2003 called the anime an outstanding success and encouraged readers to tune in.

=== Popularity and cultural impact ===
The show was quite popular in the United States, France, Indonesia and Malaysia, consistently reaching the number-one position in its timeslot in those countries. By 2007, it was TMS' best-selling anime in the non-Japanese market. Meanwhile, in its native country, Japan, the third season did not air until 2020, and it inspired TMS to focus on properties that would sell well outside Japan. In April 2009, a six-year-old Norwegian boy named Christer pressed his parents to send a letter to King Harald V of Norway to approve his name being changed to "Sonic X". They allowed Christer to write it himself but did not send it until he badgered them further, and the king responded that he could not approve the change because Christer was not eighteen years old. Extending over a decade past the show's initial release, the show has spawned internet memes and the phrase "gotta go fast", the title of the song that plays in the opening and closing sequence, has been used in the titles of video game periodical articles to represent the Sonic series and other fast-paced video games.

== Soundtrack ==
Sonic X: Original Soundtrack

Soundtrack album by Sonic X
- Released: March 3, 2004
- Recorded: 2002
- Genres: Soundtrack; rock; pop; electronic
- Length: 1:06:59
- Language: Japanese
- Label: Wave Master Entertainment

Sonic X: Original Soundtrack is the soundtrack to the series of the same name. It was released in Japan on March 3, 2004, by Wave Master Entertainment.

Track list

All music is composed by Yoshihiro Ike, except where noted.

No.	Title	Performer(s)	Length
1.	"Sonic Drive" (TV version; lyrics by Takeshi Aida, music by Cher Watanabe)	Hironobu Kageyama; Hideaki Taketori	1:31
2.	"Sonic's Fight" (from Episode 1)		2:16
3.	"Eggman" (from Episode 1)		1:55
4.	"Sonic" (from Episode 1)		2:05
5.	"The White Flower On Top of The Hill" (from Episode 16)		1:00
6.	"Sonic's Solution" (from Episode 2)		1:02
7.	"Eggman Robô" (from Episode 21)		1:07
8.	"Eggman Machine" (from Episode 33)		2:44
9.	"Encounter with Chris" (from Episode 1)		1:26
10.	"The Extravagant Appearance of Mom and Dad" (from Episode 6)		0:48
11.	"Shadow (1)" (from Episode 34)		1:24
12.	"Super Sonic" (from Episode 32)		0:28
13.	"Shadow (2)" (from Episode 34)		1:42
14.	"Amy's Hike" (from Episode 5)		1:01
15.	"Egg Fort Launch" (from Episode 20)		1:28
16.	"X-Tornado" (from Episode 8)		1:05
17.	"Battle" (from Episode 28)		1:27
18.	"All Right!" (from Episode 14)		1:53
19.	"The Ghost's Tango" (from Episode 19)		2:39
20.	"Amy's Hammer" (from Episode 19)		0:38
21.	"Mysterious & Sexy Thief Rouge" (from Episode 11)		2:43
22.	"S-Team (1)" (from Episode 1)		2:30
23.	"Hawk (Chinese Compilation)" (from Episode 17)		0:40
24.	"Eggman's African Compilation" (from Episode 18)		0:47
25.	"Adventure" (from Episode 14)		1:01
26.	"Helen's Dinner" (from Episode 14)		1:30
27.	"X-Tornado Battle Compilation" (from Episode 29)		1:07
28.	"The Master Emerald" (from Episode 29)		0:58
29.	"Chaos" (from Episode 28)		1:30
30.	"Family" (from Episode 4)		1:31
31.	"S-Team (2)" (from Episode 31)		1:50
32.	"The Thorndyke Family" (from Episode 14)		0:38
33.	"Tornado Going Round and Round" (from Episode 5)		2:00
34.	"GUN" (from Episode 33)		1:32
35.	"Coalescence" (from Episode 26)		0:37
36.	"Dark Eggman" (from Episode 24)		0:53
37.	"Mi-Ra-I (Future)" (End credits; written by Kazuyoshi Baba)	Run&Gun	4:25
38.	"Sonic Drive" (Full Version; lyrics by Takeshi Aida, music by Cher Watanabe)	Hironobu Kageyama & Hideaki Taketori	3:46
39.	"Sonic Drive" (Only version; lyrics by Takeshi Aida, music by Cher Watanabe)	Hironobu Kageyama	3:46
40.	"Sonic Drive" (Only version; lyrics by Takeshi Aida, music by Cher Watanabe)	Hideaki Taketori	3:46
Total length:			1:06:59
