= Jin Horikawa =

Japanese voice actor

- Born: December 16, 1962 (age 63)
- Occupation: Voice Actor

Jin Horikawa (堀川 仁, Horikawa Jin; born December 16, 1962) is a Japanese voice actor from Hyōgo Prefecture. He is a member of Office Osawa, the same agency that employs distinguished voice actors such as Yuji Ueda, Mitsuo Iwata, and Fumihiko Tachiki. His name is sometimes mistranslated as Hitoshi Horikawa.

== Filmography ==
- B'tX (1996) (B'TX)
- Black Cat (2005) (Igor Planter)
- Gensomaden Saiyuki (2000) (Zenon)
- Saiyuki: Requiem (2001) (Specter)

Unknown date

- Blue Dragon (Saber Tiger)
- Daraku Tenshi - The Fallen Angels (Ruchio Roche)
- Devil Lady (Man)
- Fullmetal Alchemist (General Hakuro)
- Fullmetal Alchemist: Brotherhood (Karley)
- Godannar (Shibakusa)
- Hellsing TV (Sir Peter Winfield; Test Subject)
- Initial D Fourth Stage (Akiyama Nobuhiko)
- Super Robot Wars Original Generation series (TV) (Tetsuya Onodera)
- Musashi Gundoh (Ronin)
- Akumajo Dracula X: Rondo of Blood (Richter Belmont)
- Wangan Midnight (Kijima Kouichi)
- Wind: A Breath of Heart (Akihito Narukaze)

=== Dubbing ===
- Kingmaker, Seo Chang-dae (Lee Sun-kyun)
- Parasite, Park Dong-ik (Lee Sun-kyun)
- Take Point, Dr. Yoon Ji-eui (Lee Sun-kyun)
