= Naoki Imamura =

Japanese voice actor

- Born: July 9, 1973 (age 53); Saitama Prefecture, Japan
- Occupation: Voice actor

Naoki Imamura (今村 直樹, Imamura Naoki; born July 9, 1973) is a Japanese voice actor from Saitama Prefecture attached to Aoni Production. He has played a large number of supporting and minor roles, including heroes, villains, serious and joke characters. He performed alongside Kōji Totani numerous times and voiced some of his ongoing roles after his death in honor of him. He took over the role of narrating Beat Takeshi no TV Tackle after the death of Daisuke Gōri.

== Roles ==
=== Television animation ===
1997

- Chūka Ichiban! (Villager #B, spectator #A)

1998

- Mamotte Shugogetten (Southern troop)
- Nintama Rantarō (Tsukai's Papa, Watchman #A, Man #A, Guest, Express Home Delivery Man, Dokutake Ninja)
- Yu-Gi-Oh! (Group member)

2003

- Firestorm (Jess, Narration, Duvarie, United Nations secretary)
- Detective Conan (Detective, bus driver)
- Sonic X (Tanaka, King Boom Boo, Head of Intelligence government official, E-102 Gamma)

2004

- Bobobo-bo Bo-bobo (Robo Yamada's Face)
- Kidō Senshi Gundam SEED Destiny (Takao Schreiber)

2007

- GeGeGe no Kitarō (fifth series) (Okutama Cemetery station master, Producer)
- Shining Tears X Wind (Raihi)

2008

- Golgo 13 (Tony)

2009

- Senjō no Valkyria (Aristocrat #A)

2010

- SD Gundam Sangokuden Brave Battle Warriors (Kougai Gouf)

=== OVA ===
- Kidō Senshi Gundam SEED C.E. 73: Stargazer (Royora)
- Saint Seiya: Meiō Hades Jyūnikyū Hen (Heracles Seiza no Algethi)
- Sakura Taisen: New York, New York (Howard Carter)

=== Theatrical animation ===
- Crayon Shin-chan: Arashi wo Yobu! Yuuhi no Kasukabe Boys (Security)
- Kidō Senshi Z Gundam: A New Translation -Hoshi wo Tsugusha- (Alexandria Captain)
- Steamboy (Additional voice)

=== Video games ===
- Battle Fantasia (Deathbringer)
- Dragon Ball Z Sparking! Neo (Kui (succeeding Kōji Totani), Freeza soldier #1)
  - Dragon Ball Z Sparking! Meteor (Kui (succeeding Kōji Totani), Freeza soldier #1)
- Kidō Senshi Gundam: MS Sensen 0079 (Soldier)
- Kidō Senshi Gundam: Spirits of Zion (Alpha A. Bait)
- Metal Gear series
  - Metal Gear Acid 2 (Golab)
  - Metal Gear Solid (Genome soldier #B (Johnny Sasaki))
  - Metal Gear Solid: Portable Ops (High government official)
  - Metal Gear Solid 2: Sons of Liberty (Johnny Sasaki)
  - Metal Gear Solid 3: Snake Eater (Johnny)
- Rockman Zero 4 (Heat Gemblem)
- SD Gundam G Generation (Alpha A. Bait, Ethan Raiya, Gady Kinzey)
- Shining Wind (Raihi)
- Soulcalibur III (Custom character: Young Man #2)
- Tales of Fandom Vol.1 (Clayton)

=== Drama CD ===
- Tales of Destiny (Dustoff Draiden)

=== Dubbing roles ===
- Superman: The Animated Series (Kanto)
- Sahara (Imam, sailor, soldier, guard)

=== Tokusatsu ===
- Chō Ninja Tai Inazuma! (Mushigon)
- Super Sentai series
  - Engine Sentai Go-onger (Savage Land Barbaric Machine Beast Boring Banki (ep. 8)
  - Hyakujū Sentai Gaoranger (Mōjūtsukai Org (voice) (ep. 38)
  - Ninpū Sentai Hurricaneger (Metal Ninja Tekkotsumeba (ep. 12)
  - Tokumei Sentai Go-Busters (Kuwagataloid (voice) (ep. 46 - 47)
- Kamen Rider × Super Sentai: Super Hero Taisen (Kamen Rider Kuuga, Doukoku Chimatsuri)

=== Other ===
- Beat Takeshi no TV Tackle (TV Asahi) (Narration (succeeding Daisuke Gōri))
- FNS Chikyū Tokusō Tai Dybastar (Maru-san)
- Hikkuri Hōritsu Ryokōsha (NHK) (Narration)
