= Rebecca Honig =

American voice actress

- Born: New York, United States
- Occupation: Voice actress
- Years active: 1990–present

Rebecca Honig is an American voice actress, who works on the properties of 4Kids Entertainment and Central Park Media. She is also credited as Becca, Rebecca Miriam, Rebecca Handler, and Margeaux Hartman.

== Filmography ==
=== Animation roles ===
- 12 Tiny Christmas Tales - Veggies
- Alien Nine - Additional voices
- Arcade Gamer Fubuki - Ruriko Sakuragasaki
- DNA^2 - Lulara Kawasaki
- Gall Force: New Era - Ruby
- Geobreeders: Breakthrough - Namiko
- Hammerboy - Angdu's Mother
- Ichi the Killer: Episode Zero - Midori
- Mask of Zeguy - Sayaka
- Sonic X - Cream the Rabbit, Cheese the Chao, Vanilla the Rabbit, Tikal, Maria Robotnik
- Tales of Seduction - Sachiko
- Winx Club - Undine
- Urotsukidoji: New Saga - Akemi

=== Video games ===
- Sonic the Hedgehog (series) - Cream the Rabbit (2005–2010) Maria Robotnik (2005) Omochao (2007)
  - Shadow the Hedgehog
  - Sonic Riders (series)
    - Sonic Riders
    - Sonic Riders: Zero Gravity
  - Sonic Rush
  - Sonic and the Secret Rings
  - Mario & Sonic at the Olympic Games (series) - Cream the Rabbit
    - Beijing 2008
    - Vancouver 2010

=== Live-action dubbing ===
- Beautiful Weapon - Woman
- Big Boobs Buster - Eriko, Mom
- Scorpion's Revenge - Yukiko Kida, Additional Voices
