= Sōichirō Tanaka (voice actor) =

Japanese voice actor

Sōichirō Tanaka (田中 総一郎, Tanaka Sōichirō; born December 23, 1964) is a Japanese voice actor. He is from Yamanashi, Japan. He is mainly known for his role in Sonic X as Sam Speed. He is part of the voice-acting company Office Osawa.

== Notable voice roles ==
- 100% Pascal-sensei (Narration)
- Cyborg 009 (young Dr. Gamo Whisky)
- Daphne in the Brilliant Blue (Shibasaki Run)
- Devil Lady (Tawada)
- Glass Fleet: La légende du vent de l'univers (John Fall)
- Heat Guy J (Gena)
- Musashi Gundoh (Priest Takuan)
- Panyo Panyo Di Gi Charat (Uncle)
- Rave Master (Belial, La Grace, Tanchimo)
- Rockman EXE (Shuuseki Ijuin, CosmoMan, FreezeMan)
- Saiyuki (Ryokusho)
- Samurai Deeper Kyo (Haira)
- Sonic X (Sam Speed)
- 2 Stupid Dogs (Japanese dub) (Big Dog)

=== Tokusatsu ===
- Chouseishin Gransazer (ep. 1 Narration)
- Tokusou Sentai Dekaranger (Karakazlian Sanoa (ep. 32–33))
