= Meish Goldish =

American writer

Meish Goldish (born Tulsa, Oklahoma) is an author of fiction and nonfiction books and poetry. He has written over 500 books, ranging from 8-page and 16-page readers for schoolchildren to books over 100 pages long for libraries. One of his biggest-selling books is called 101 Science Poems and Songs for Young Learners. Another big seller is Making Multiplication Easy. Both are published by Scholastic.

In the summer of 2006, Goldish was the Writer Spotlight for Literary Magic, a literary magazine on language.

In the winter of 2013, he was interviewed by Randi Wartelsky on her radio show "Something to Talk About," which airs on the Nachum Segal Network.

In the summer of 2014, he was interviewed by Gina Kaufmann on her radio show "Central Standard," which airs on public radio in Kansas City, Missouri.

Goldish was born and raised in Tulsa, Oklahoma. He attended high school at the Hebrew Theological College in Skokie, Illinois. He graduated from Case Western Reserve University in Cleveland, Ohio, where he majored in English and minored in education. After moving to New York, Goldish taught high school English for five years. He has been a professional writer for nearly 50 years.

Goldish often gets ideas for stories from personal experiences. For instance, after visiting a paper factory in Massachusetts, he wrote a nonfiction book about how paper is made, and a fiction story called "Paper Party." Ideas for other stories come purely from his imagination. Says Goldish, "I make up characters I've never met, places I’ve never visited, and events that have never occurred."

Goldish gives advice to other writers such as this: "Start by writing about things you know. Then branch out into other topics. Be as creative as possible, but at the same time, keep in mind the age level for which you are writing. Make sure your sentence length and vocabulary are appropriate for your readers."

Goldish's works have inspired many children to both read and write. He hopes to keep writing fiction, nonfiction, and poetry that readers find entertaining and appealing.

In the summer of 2006, Meish Goldish was the Writer Spotlight for Literary Magic, a literary magazine on language. The above is based on the Editor of Literary Magic's interview with the author.
