= Suzanne Goldish =

American voice actress

Suzanne Goldfish
- Other name: Suzy Goldfish
- Occupations: ADR voice director; audio engineer; photographer; voice actress
- Years active: 1991–present

Suzanne Goldish, sometimes credited as Suzy Goldish, is an American ADR voice director, audio engineer, photographer and voice actress.

== Career ==
Goldish worked on the properties of 4Kids Entertainment; she was the ADR engineer for the Pokémon TV series. Goldish is also known as the voice of Jasmine from the popular Yu-Gi-Oh! GX series.

Goldish has gained extensive experience and honed her kids' entertainment chops through years in Sesame Workshop's Interactive Technologies group, as well as the Educate Products/Hooked on Phonics Product Development group in New York City. She is also an accomplished photographer; she holds a master's degree in photography at the NYU. Additionally, Suzanne also teaches photography classes in the Los Angeles area.

She currently resides in Los Angeles, California and works for Studiopolis. Goldish has directed the Viz Sailor Moon dub, Tiger and Bunny The Movie: The Rising, and the K: Missing Kings movie.

== Voice roles ==
=== Anime/Animation ===
- Sonic X - Christopher Thorndyke (young)
- Winx Club (4Kids edit) - Additional voices
- Pokémon - Additional voices
  - Pokémon Chronicles - Nick (young)
- Yu-Gi-Oh! GX - Jasmine
- Teenage Mutant Ninja Turtles - Random child, additional voices
- Sailor Moon Crystal - Yumiko, Additional Voices

=== Video games ===
- L.A. Noire - Judy Lynn

== Production credits ==
- Bleach - Recording engineer, Voice Director
- Bleach: The Hell Verse - Voice Director
- Blur - Recording engineer
- Digimon Fusion - ADR Mixing
- Dino Time - ADR Editor
- F-Zero: GP Legend - Recording Engineer
- Final Fantasy XIII-2 - Dialogue Editor, Recording engineer
- Hulk and the Agents of S.M.A.S.H. - Foley Artist
- K - Voice Director
- Kekkaishi - Casting & Voice Director
- Lost Planet 2 - Recording engineer
- Magical Doremi - ADR Engineer
- Marvel Heroes - Recording engineer
- NFL Rush Zone - ADR Mixer
- Naruto Shippuden - Recording engineer
- One Piece (4Kids Dub) - Sound Design
- Pokémon: Destiny Deoxys - ADR Editor
- Pokémon Advance - ADR Engineer
- Randy Cunningham: 9th Grade Ninja - ADR Mixer
- Red Dead Redemption - Recording Engineer
- Sailor Moon - Recording Engineer, Voice Director (Viz Media dub)
- Sonic X - Recording Engineer
- Sonic Colors - Recording Engineer
- Sonic Free Riders - Dialogue Editor, Recording Engineer
- Sonic Generations - Dialogue Editor, Recording Engineer
- Sonic Boom: Rise of Lyric - Dialogue Editor
- The Super Hero Squad Show - Dialogue Editor
- Stitch! - Recording Engineer
- Tiger & Bunny - Recording Engineer, Voice Director
- Mew Mew Power - Sound Design
- Transformers: Prime - Dialogue Editor
- Transformers: Robots in Disguise - Dialogue Recordist
- Valkyria Chronicles II - Sound Engineer
- Vanquish - Recording engineer
- Yu-Gi-Oh! - ADR Engineer
