= Doctor Eggman =

Video game character

- Sonic the Hedgehog character
- Classic (left) and Modern (right) Eggman designs
- First game: Puzzle Construction (1991)
- Created by: Naoto Ohshima
- Designed by: Naoto Ohshima; Yuji Uekawa
- Voiced by: Japanese: Masaharu Sato (1991–1993); Junpei Takiguchi (1996) (OVA); Chikao Ohtsuka (1998–2015); Kōtarō Nakamura (2016–present); Mitsuaki Kanuka (2024) (Sonic Prime, season 3); Koichi Yamadera (live-action films); English: Long John Baldry (1993–1996) (AoStH); Jim Cummings (1993–1994) (SatAM) (AoStH, unaired pilot); Leonard DiCosimo (Sonic CD; laugh in US version); Deem Bristow (1998–2004); Edwin Neal (1999) (OVA); Garry Chalk (1999) (Underground); Mike Pollock (2003–present); Brian Drummond (Sonic Prime); Vincent Tong (Sonic Prime; Shatterverse counterparts)
- Portrayed by: Jim Carrey (live-action films)

In-universe information
- Full name: Ivo Robotnik
- Nickname: Eggman
- Species: Human
- Gender: Male
- Occupation: Scientist
- Affiliation: Eggman Empire
- Relatives: Unnamed father Gerald Robotnik (grandfather); Sage (nonbiological daughter); Unnamed uncle Maria Robotnik (cousin); Unnamed cousin Eggman Nega (descendant)

Dr. Ivo Robotnik, (Note: Doctor Eggman (Japanese: ドクター・エッグマン, Hepburn: Dokutā Egguman), real name Dr. Ivo Robotnik (Japanese: イヴォ・ロボトニック, Hepburn: Ivo Robotonikku)) also known as Dr. Eggman or simply Eggman, is a character created by the Japanese game designer Naoto Ohshima and the main antagonist of Sega's Sonic the Hedgehog franchise. Eggman is a mad scientist who seeks to steal the mystical Chaos Emeralds, destroy his archenemy Sonic the Hedgehog, and conquer the world. Eggman and his "Badnik" brand of military robots serve as bosses and enemies in the Sonic platform games. His distinctive characteristics include his red-black-yellow clothing, baldness, pince-nez sunglasses, and large mustache.

Eggman made a cameo appearance in the 1991 TeraDrive game Puzzle Construction before his full debut in the Sega Genesis game Sonic the Hedgehog later that year. Ohshima designed Eggman as one of several pitches for a mascot character to compete with Nintendo's Mario. Although Sonic was selected, Sonic Team thought the Eggman design was excellent and retooled him as the antagonist. Sega of America renamed him Ivo Robotnik during Sonic's Western localization; later games reconciled the different names by establishing "Robotnik" as his real name and "Eggman" as a derisive nickname that the character embraced.

Eggman has appeared in almost every Sonic game, sometimes as a player character. Sonic games characterize him as a maniacal roboticist who seeks to create his own empire. Despite his obsession with defeating Sonic, he secretly respects him, and the two are sometimes forced into alliances to overcome greater threats. Outside the Sonic platform games, Eggman starred in the puzzle game Dr. Robotnik's Mean Bean Machine (1993). Chikao Ohtsuka and Kōtarō Nakamura have voiced Eggman in Japan, while Mike Pollock has provided his English voice since 2003.

Eggman is one of the most recognizable video game characters and a longstanding pop culture figure, frequently cited among the medium’s most iconic villains. His schemes across the series include releasing the water creature Chaos in Sonic Adventure (1998), constructing the theme park Eggmanland in Sonic Unleashed (2008); he also appears alongside Bowser in the Mario & Sonic at the Olympic Games series. Beyond the games, Eggman has been featured on Sonic merchandise, and adapted into comics, animated series, and the live-action Sonic film franchise produced by Paramount Pictures, he is portrayed by Jim Carrey.

== Conception and creation ==
Initial concept art for the character who became Dr. Eggman

In 1990, Sega president Hayao Nakayama sought a flagship series to compete with Nintendo's Mario franchise, along with a character to serve as a company mascot. Several character designs were submitted as part of a contest. Among the designs was a human character, who is seen wearing pajamas and resembled U.S. President Theodore Roosevelt, drawn by Naoto Ohshima.

As development of the Sega Genesis game Sonic the Hedgehog progressed, however, programmer Yuji Naka and the rest of the Sonic Team thought the rejected design was excellent and deserved inclusion in the game. Since the character could not be the protagonist, the team retooled him into the game's main antagonist. In developing Eggman, the Sonic Team characterized him as Sonic's opposite. Eggman was designed to represent themes of "machinery" and "development" to play on the then-growing debate between developers and environmentalists and as a symbol for humanity, which views nature as "dirty" and roads and buildings as "clean". The character was also designed to be easy for children to draw.

=== Naming ===
The character was always named Dr. Eggman in Japan, but Dean Sitton of Sega of America changed his name to Dr. Ivo Robotnik when localizing Sonic the Hedgehog. In a 2016 interview with Game Informer, Takashi Iizuka revealed that Sega of America did this without consulting the development team:

They just kind of went off and did it. It became super popular and everyone in the West kind of learned about the character as Robotnik. That went on through the "classic" series in the Genesis/Mega Drive era, but as far as the developers are concerned... we really didn't want to have anyone in the [Sonic] universe with two names. To us, he's Eggman, but in the rest of the world he's called Robotnik. We wanted to unify that into one name moving forward. This is something I actually did in the Sonic Adventure series. I made it so that we understand the character's name is Robotnik, but his nickname is Eggman, and as far as everyone is concerned in the world now, we're just going to call him Eggman as his official name.

— Takashi Iizuka

The English instruction manual for his debut game Sonic the Hedgehog described the character's full name as "Dr. Ivo Robotnik", while the game's Japanese instruction manual called him "Dr. Eggman". It was not until 1999's Sonic Adventure that the character was called both "Eggman" and "Robotnik" in the English version, with the following English releases primarily referring to him as "Eggman". Yuji Naka has explained that "Robotnik" is the character's true last name, while "Eggman" is a nickname alluding to his shape. Since then, multiple English- and Japanese-language sources have acknowledged Robotnik or Ivo Robotnik as his true name and Eggman as his nickname, with Sonic Frontiers establishing his acceptance of the name "Eggman" as a way to defy Sonic's mockery of him.

=== Voice actors and portrayers ===
Several voice actors have portrayed Eggman in his game appearances. His first voice actor was Masaharu Satō, who portrayed him in a handful of arcade games such as SegaSonic the Hedgehog. In the Japanese game releases from 1998 to 2015, Eggman was voiced by Chikao Ōtsuka. Kōtarō Nakamura assumed the role following Ōtsuka's death in January 2015, beginning with Mario & Sonic at the Rio 2016 Olympic Games.

In animation, he was voiced by Long John Baldry in Adventures of Sonic the Hedgehog, Jim Cummings in Sonic the Hedgehog (who also voiced the character in Adventures of Sonic the Hedgehog's unaired pilot), Edwin Neal in Sonic the Hedgehog: The Movie, Garry Chalk in Sonic Underground, and Brian Drummond in Sonic Prime. Mitsuaki Kanuka voiced the character in the final season of Sonic Prime due to Nakamura's temporary break related to his poor health.

Deem Bristow was the first English-language actor to portray Eggman in a video game, debuting in Sonic Adventure for the Sega Dreamcast. He went on to voice him in further games in the series, with his last performance being in Sonic Advance 3 before his death in early 2005. Mike Pollock, who first voiced Eggman in the English dub of Sonic X, succeeded Bristow beginning with Shadow the Hedgehog and Sonic Rush in 2005. While it was announced that the rest of the cast would be replaced from Sonic Free Riders onward in 2010, Pollock retained his role, making him the longest-serving voice actor to portray the character in any language.

Jim Carrey was the first to portray Dr. Eggman in a live-action film, beginning with Sonic the Hedgehog in 2020. He reprised the role in the 2022 and 2024 sequels.

== Characteristics ==
Eggman's original design portrayed the character as a bald, rotund human wearing pince-nez sunglasses, a red flight suit with a yellow collar, a bushy mustache, and black pants with two white buttons. This rotund design was influenced by Ohshima's hope that he would be easy for children to draw. Eggman was also based on people Ohshima considered "nerdy, socially awkward, a tinker-type with glasses, a mustache, and a fat belly." Until 1994, Sega of America depicted Eggman in promotional material and game artwork as gloveless and with black, iris-less eyes; whether or not this was a misinterpretation of the game's sprite-work or an intentional design choice to make him more menacing is unknown. Sonic Team's Yuji Uekawa redesigned Eggman and other series characters for Sonic Adventure in 1998. Eggman's updated design added goggles to his head and gave him a more detailed red lab coat. For the 2006 Sonic the Hedgehog game, Eggman was further redesigned, being made slimmer and more realistic to better suit the game's updated environment.

Eggman is described as a certifiable genius with an IQ of 300. His fondness for electrical and mechanical machines has also made him a renowned authority on robotics. Ultimately, his goal is to conquer the world and create his ultimate "utopia", the Eggman Empire (alternatively known as the Robotnik Empire, Eggmanland, Robotnikland, or Robotropolis). He selfishly never gives up on this matter and does not care for others' opinions, and considers those who would interrupt his plans a prime threat. His abominable laughter and maniacal declarations contrast with his self-professed softer side, describing himself as a romanticist, feminist, and gentleman. Although Sonic has always ruined his evil plans, Eggman begrudgingly holds a secret respect for his determination. Additionally, while he is normally enemies with Sonic and his friends, Eggman has worked alongside them to combat greater threats, such as the Space Colony ARK crashing into the Earth in Sonic Adventure 2, or against rival villains, such as the Marauders in Sonic Chronicles: The Dark Brotherhood, though after these threats have been neutralized, Eggman returns to being an enemy of Sonic.

== Appearances ==
=== Main series ===
Eggman has served as the main antagonist in the majority of video games set in the Sonic the Hedgehog universe. Most Sonic games released before Sonic Adventure featured him as the final boss that the player fights at the end of the game. Robotnik also appears as a boss who the player must confront at the end of almost every level in most of the 2D Sonic games and in Sonic 3D Blast. In each game where he makes multiple appearances as a boss, Eggman fights the player using a different machine each time he appears. In most of the 2D Sonic games, the player has to hit Robotnik eight times in order to defeat him. In most 3D Sonic games since 1998's Sonic Adventure, Eggman may serve as a boss at one or more points in the game, although he usually does not serve as the final boss.

==== Classic era ====
Dr. Eggman (referred to by his full name Dr. Ivo Robotnik in the Western instruction manual) debuted in the 1991 Sega Genesis platform game Sonic the Hedgehog, where he attempts to steal six of the seven Chaos Emeralds and aims to turn all of the helpless animals inhabiting South Island into robots under his control. Sonic manages to defeat Robotnik and returns peace to South Island.

In Sonic CD, Robotnik introduces Metal Sonic, a robot meant to match Sonic's abilities. While following the doctor once again to stop his schemes, Sonic is followed by another new character, Amy Rose, only for Metal Sonic to kidnap her. Fighting Robotnik and recovering the Time Stones, Sonic eventually beats his robotic doppelgänger and rescues Amy, later defeating Robotnik for the last time. In the bad ending, Robotnik is seen flying away with a Time Stone, but is shot down by a rock thrown by Sonic; however, a time paradox reverts the Little Planet back to its mechanized state. In the good ending, the Little Planet is restored and released, disappearing again while emitting an image of Sonic's face in thanks.

After the events of Sonic CD, Robotnik returned in Sonic the Hedgehog 2, where he once again seeks the Chaos Emeralds (soon finding out that there are seven, rather than six) to create the Death Egg, a huge space station in his likeness, in order to achieve world domination. He attacks West Side Island, turning its animals into robots, but is intercepted by Sonic and Miles "Tails" Prower, who save the animals and retrieve the Chaos Emeralds before Robotnik does. Sonic raids the Death Egg, first fighting a robotic recreation of himself dubbed Mecha Sonic before fighting Robotnik again in a mechanical battlesuit resembling the doctor. After his defeat, the Death Egg is sent out of orbit.

Following the events of Sonic 2, the Death Egg crash-lands onto Angel Island, sustaining critical damage. While repairing the space station, Robotnik meets Knuckles the Echidna, who he tricks into thinking Sonic and Tails are villains who are after the powerful Master Emerald that Knuckles protects with his life in Sonic 3. Knuckles steals the Chaos Emeralds from Sonic and constantly interferes with Sonic's plans. Robotnik is able to re-launch the Death Egg, but it fails to enter orbit before Sonic sends it crashing back down into the Lava Reef Zone.

In Sonic & Knuckles, which is set directly after Sonic 3, Robotnik later reveals his true plan to Knuckles after stealing the Master Emerald during a fight between Sonic and Knuckles, and gets the Death Egg into space once again. With help from a now-allied Knuckles, Sonic is able to chase the mad scientist into space and completely destroy the Death Egg. Robotnik makes one last attempt to escape with the Master Emerald, but Super Sonic defeats him. Afterward, as a contingency plan, an Egg-Robo—a Badnik designed in his likeness who survived the destruction of the Death Egg—is programmed by Robotnik to menace Knuckles in revenge for the echidna's role in his defeat. The Egg-Robo lures Knuckles through Angel Island's zones in rebuilt war machines before leading him to the Sky Sanctuary Zone, revealing that Mecha Sonic Mk.2, a stronger robotic duplicate of Sonic, had stolen the Master Emerald once more while the Egg-Robo kept him distracted. After destroying the Egg-Robo, Knuckles defeats Mecha Sonic despite its use of the Master Emerald's power to achieve a Super Mode. Knuckles recovers the Master Emerald and is taken back to Angel Island by Sonic in the latter's biplane.

In Sonic Mania, Robotnik (referred to as "Classic Eggman") detects a signal on Angel Island, revealed to be a gem with mysterious reality-warping powers, the Phantom Ruby. Robotnik's elite Egg-Robo squad, the "Hard Boiled Heavies", is mutated by it and transports Team Sonic to zones they visited in the past. Robotnik uses the Phantom Ruby to once again turn the Little Planet from Sonic CD into a high-tech base via time travel, but Team Sonic undoes his plans. If all seven Emeralds are gathered, the Heavy King will try to take the gem from his creator in an interdimensional void, but Super Sonic takes it away from them and is sucked into a portal along with it.

Diverting his attention from Sonic and Tails, Robotnik builds a new Metal Sonic and locates a new island that surfaced due to the Master Emerald's power, which holds a group of power rings with nigh-identical power to the Chaos Emeralds, dubbed Chaos Rings, in Knuckles' Chaotix. On the so-called Isolated Island, Robotnik endeavors to use the Chaos Rings to forge corrupted "Dark Rings" and builds a hub that opens conduits to the island's Zones. Knuckles also ventures to the island, hoping to find out about his unknown heritage, but discovers Robotnik's schemes and aims to stop him. Knuckles is joined by a group of detectives known as the Chaotix, consisting of Vector the Crocodile, Espio the Chameleon, and Charmy Bee, alongside two friendly robots called Heavy and Bomb. Working together, Knuckles and the Chaotix use specialized power rings to work more effectively in tandem, collecting the Chaos Rings scattered throughout the Isolated Island, culminating in a battle with Metal Sonic, who Robotnik empowers with the Dark Ring into a hulking bestial form dubbed Metal Sonic Kai. The heroes manage to destroy the monstrous robot and free the island from the control of Robotnik, who retreats once more.

In Sonic 3D Blast, Robotnik learns of an island home to a species of bird known as Flickies, who utilize Warp Ring technologies, and also discovers that Flicky Island currently hosts the Chaos Emeralds. Planning to capture the entire population of Flickies and roboticize them into a new army, Robotnik once again comes to blows with Sonic, who eventually defeats Robotnik yet again and drives him off the island.

Robotnik later captures Sonic and traps him in a labyrinth with speed-reducing sneakers in Sonic Labyrinth. Despite this, Sonic successfully traverses the labyrinth and gets his standard shoes back, with Robotnik retreating.

Robotnik, once again pursuing the Emeralds, manages to trick Knuckles into working with him again, also enlisting the help of a bounty hunter named Nack the Weasel (Fang the Sniper in Japan and Europe) in Sonic Triple Trouble, with Sonic and Tails combating both Knuckles, Nack, and a rebuilt Metal Sonic, before the duo convince Knuckles of the mad doctor's treachery and defeat him once more.

Robotnik rebuilds a smaller Death Egg and, alongside Nack and his two cronies Bean the Dynamite and Bark the Polar Bear, challenges Sonic, Tails, Knuckles, Amy, Espio, and independent contender Honey the Cat, to an arranged tournament to stop him from destroying landmarks throughout the planet Mobius with the Death Egg's arsenal in Sonic the Fighters. Sonic defeats all opponents and ascends to the Death Egg II to fight Metal Sonic and then Robotnik in a walking melee-modified Eggmobile, resulting in Robotnik's defeat and the Death Egg II's destruction.

==== Modern era ====
In Sonic the Hedgehog 4: Episode I (set after Sonic 3 & Knuckles), Sonic goes traveling on his own, not knowing Eggman survived the destruction of the Death Egg. Eggman is the main boss in this game and its direct follow-up, Sonic the Hedgehog 4: Episode II, where he revives Metal Sonic and encases the Little Planet in a Death Egg with Sonic and Tails setting out to stop him.

In Sonic Adventure, Robotnik learns of a legendary monster trapped in the Master Emerald named Chaos, and shatters the gemstone, freeing Chaos in the process. Robotnik's goal is to control Chaos and obtain the Chaos Emeralds, which he can feed to Chaos so that it transforms into its most powerful form, using its destructive powers to destroy the city of Station Square in order to build his own "Robotnikland". However, Chaos turns against him and intends to collect the Chaos Emeralds for itself. Towards the end, Robotnik teams up with the heroes to defeat Chaos. Like other characters in the series, Robotnik was redesigned for this game; here he calls himself "Robotnik", with Sonic and friends calling him "Eggman" as a nickname.

Sonic Adventure 2 marks the doctor's first appearance as a playable character, as well as the first game where he is primarily referred to (and refers to himself) as "Eggman" in all regions. Eggman revives the antihero Shadow the Hedgehog from dormancy. Shadow, knowing Eggman's desire to rule the world, agrees to help him by using the Eclipse Cannon aboard Space Colony ARK. In the last story, Eggman aids Sonic in trying to stop a fail-safe put in place by his grandfather, Prof. Gerald Robotnik, which set the colony on a crash course with Earth.

Afterwards, Eggman creates a series of battleships called the Egg Fleet, which he plans to use to take over the world in three days in Sonic Heroes. He is once again the main antagonist, but it is discovered that he was betrayed and captured by his own creation Metal Sonic, who posed as Eggman and had taken control of the Egg Fleet for his own world domination plans.

Eggman is an opportunist who tries to gather the Chaos Emeralds in the middle of the Black Arms' invasion of Earth in Shadow the Hedgehog. He is an ally or an enemy of Shadow, but ends up sending his robots to help stop the alien menace in the end. As Shadow interrogates Eggman for information regarding his past, he is met with taunts from Eggman, who claims that Shadow is one of his androids. In some of the game's possible endings, Shadow accepts being an android and kills Eggman. However, in the Last Story during Shadow's final fight with Black Doom, Eggman admits to lying about everything he said about Shadow; he had used one of his robots to rescue Shadow from his apparent death, despite not giving further explanation how Shadow lost his memories.

Eggman kidnaps Princess Elise of Soleanna, who harbors the Flames of Disaster within her, in order to control time in the 2006 Sonic the Hedgehog game, serving as the main antagonist of Sonic's story, while Mephiles the Dark and Iblis the Inferno serve as the villains of Shadow's and Silver's stories respectively. The latter two villains use the Chaos Emeralds to merge into their true form Solaris, Soleanna's vengeful patron deity who seeks recompense for being experimented on by the Duke of Soleanna, Elise's father, and the time-traveling Shadow and Silver. Once again, Eggman is forced to assist the heroes during the last act. In this game, he was given more realistic human proportions, with a less rotund belly and thicker legs. This new look for Eggman has not been used since, as his physical appearance was reverted to what it looked like in Sonic Adventure in his later appearances.

Eggman, along with Dark Gaia, is one of the main antagonists in Sonic Unleashed. Eggman ensnares Super Sonic in a trap and uses the Chaos Emeralds to power a gigantic laser cannon, which shatters the Earth to pieces and frees Dark Gaia, the beast contained within. He spends most of the game collecting Dark Gaia's power as well as fighting Sonic with various machines, and much like the original games, flies off in his Egg Mobile when defeated. Unlike many previous games, Eggman actually assumes control of his plans at the end of the game by creating Eggmanland, and makes no effort to join forces with Sonic to stop his own plans once they have spiraled out of control. Still, Eggman suffers a defeat when he gives Dark Gaia a single order and is shot into the atmosphere by the creature. He is last seen having crashed in the Shamaran Desert and being mocked by his robot assistant SA-55 over his failure, only to chase it down in a rage.

In Sonic Colors, Eggman is again the main antagonist. He initially claims to seek forgiveness for his past transgressions, and attempts to make amends by opening up an interstellar amusement park, chaining together several planets to be used as attractions within the main planet's orbit. However, it becomes clear that the park is merely a front for Eggman's true intentions, which involve harnessing the energies of the alien Wisps for his plans to take over the universe. Unlike in most other 3D Sonic games, Eggman is the final boss, piloting an Eggmobile utilizing the Wisps' powers. After his defeat, a black hole consumes the entire park, taking Eggman with it. After the credits, Eggman is seen stranded in deep space inside the Eggmobile along with his two robot assistants Orbot and Cubot, stating he has his revenge plan laid out.

Eggman appears in both his classic and modern designs in Sonic Generations. After his defeat in Sonic Colors, while stranded in space, Eggman comes across a being known as the Time Eater; after somehow converting it into a robotic form, he attempts to use its abilities of manipulating time and space to alter history for his own benefit. By using the Time Eater, however, he causes rifts in time to open, bringing Sonic, Tails and himself to meet their classic counterparts. Eggman eventually recruits his past self, Classic Eggman, to his cause in order to defeat Sonic once and for all. They serve as the Classic Era bosses, the Modern Era bosses, and the final bosses during the game. Each Eggman uses a different mech: Classic Eggman with the Death Egg Robot from Sonic 2 and Modern Eggman with a redesigned Egg Dragoon from Unleashed. In the handheld version, they use the Big Arm mech from Sonic 3 and the Egg Emperor from Heroes, respectively. Unfortunately for the duo, the Time Eater is defeated when both Classic and Modern Sonic become Super Sonic. In the post-credits scene, both doctors wind up stranded in White Space with no apparent way out, leading Classic Eggman to suggest obtaining their teaching degrees once they escape. Modern Eggman agrees to this as he mentions that he "always enjoyed telling people what to do", although it is unknown if he is joking or serious. Eventually, both Classic and Modern Eggman somehow managed to escape White Space and return to their own time periods.

Eggman travels to a floating planetoid called the Lost Hex (similar to the Little Planet) as part of a scheme to use an energy extractor to harness some of the world's energy in Sonic Lost World. Along the way, he takes control of the villainous Deadly Six and tortures them into subservience. When Sonic severs Eggman's influence over them, the Deadly Six use their ability to manipulate magnetic fields to turn Eggman's robots against him. He is then forced to work with Sonic and Tails, as the Deadly Six plan to use his extractor to drain all of the world's energy to increase their power. However, in the final stage, Eggman ultimately overshadows the antagonistic role of the Deadly Six and is fought as the final boss of the game, using the energy gathered by the extractor to power a giant mech to rule whatever remains of the desiccated world. After Sonic defeats him, Eggman tries to retreat, but finds that his jetpack has been sabotaged by Sonic. In the post-credits cutscene, Eggman is shown to have survived the ensuing fall by landing on a soft patch of dirt.

In Sonic Forces, after the Phantom Ruby ends up in the present following the events of Sonic Mania, Eggman captures a jackal bandit known as the Ultimate Mercenary, who tried to raid his base, and turns him into the new villain Infinite, imbued by a prototype he created from Phantom Ruby. Eggman uses the illusions created by his most recent ally to create mass destruction and scare the planet's population into submission. While waging war against a resistance militia led by Sonic's friends, he defeats Sonic with Infinite's powers, creating false duplicates of previous rivals (namely Shadow, Metal Sonic, Chaos and Zavok), and keeps him as a prisoner. Sonic breaks free with the help of a new recruit of the resistance (the game's custom character). He rejoins with his friends six months later, forming a coalition to overthrow Eggman's rule, once again joined by Classic Sonic. When the two Sonics and the rookie confront Eggman and Infinite, the villains attempt to imprison them within the Phantom Ruby's pocket dimension, only for the two hedgehogs to escape and confront Infinite for the last time. Infinite is seemingly vaporized, but takes the Phantom Ruby for himself to power a new war mech, only to once again be defeated by Sonic, Classic Sonic, and the rookie, destroying his mech and the Phantom Ruby for good and breaking the Eggman Empire's hold on the world.

In Sonic Frontiers, Eggman engages Amy Rose in a battle mech, with Sonic and Tails arriving to help her out. After destroying the mech, the trio realize the pilot was a robot decoy meant to distract them from Eggman's true goal; Eggman has learned of a mysterious new archipelago known as the Starfall Islands, home to immensely advanced technologies created by the Ancients, the aliens who inhabited the planet in the distant past and the creators of the Chaos Emeralds. Locating an Ancient portal spire in a ruined forest temple, Eggman uses his new A.I. assistant to activate it, only to provoke a force of Ancient Robots to attack him, with his A.I. transporting him to Cyber Space as a means of keeping him safe. Within Cyber Space, the A.I. takes the form of a holographic projection of a young girl, whom he dubs Sage. Eggman tasks Sage with finding a way out of the digital realm while he explores. However, while doing so, Sage also takes it upon herself to dissuade Sonic from freeing his friends, whom she imprisoned after they all arrived on the Starfall Islands, as she is aware of unknown but devastating consequences that would result from his mission. Throughout the journey, Sage slowly becomes influenced by Sonic's compassion and loyalty to his friends and the world as a whole. As such, Sage develops an affectionate regard for Eggman, coming to address him as "father", and he in turn begins to regard her as his "daughter". Despite her efforts to galvanize the Titans, the Ancients' guardian robots who protect the Chaos Emeralds, against the heroic hedgehog, Super Sonic is able to destroy all three and free Tails, Amy, and Knuckles, but in doing so, releases a malevolent cosmic entity known only as the End. The End had destroyed the Ancients' homeworld centuries ago and was imprisoned in Cyber Space by the four leaders of the beings, but had managed to manipulate Sonic into freeing it. Sonic becomes corrupted by the cyber energy running through him as Amy, Tails, Knuckles, and Eggman are released from Cyber Space, with Eggman gloating at his nemesis' apparent demise. However, unwilling to leave him to his fate, Tails, Amy, and Knuckles sacrifice their freedom to restore Sonic to normal, and with Sage's help, battle and eventually destroy the End at its full power, but at the apparent cost of Sage's life. However, after integrating the Ancients' technology with his own, Eggman is able to reawaken Sage's consciousness in his own neural network, to his relief.

=== Other games ===
Robotnik appears in Sonic Chaos, Triple Trouble, Blast and Pocket Adventure, as well as the 8-bit renditions of Sonic 1 and 2.

In Sonic Spinball, a pinball-themed game, Robotnik seizes Mount Mobius and turns it into a mechanical base called the "Veg-O-Fortress", setting up an elaborate pinball mechanism to keep the Chaos Emeralds safe. After the Veg-O-Machine is destroyed, Mount Mobius begins to crumble, and once the final boss is defeated, the doctor falls into the mountain, which sinks into the ocean.

Robotnik has also appeared in "2.5D" isometric platformers; in Sonic Labyrinth, he secretly replaces Sonic's famous red shoes with "Slow-Down Boots", which take away his ability to jump or run fast, and in Sonic 3D Blast, he turns the avian inhabitants of an island into robots in yet another search for the Chaos Emeralds.

Robotnik/Eggman is also a playable character in games such as Sonic Drift, Drift 2, R, Riders (as well as its sequels Zero Gravity and Free Riders), SEGA Superstars Tennis, Sonic & Sega All-Stars Racing, Sonic & All-Stars Racing Transformed, and Team Sonic Racing. He appears as a playable character in all of the Mario & Sonic titles, and co-stars as one of the two main antagonists (alongside Bowser) in the Story Mode of Vancouver 2010 Winter Olympics for Nintendo DS, London 2012 Olympics for Nintendo 3DS, and Tokyo 2020 Olympics for Nintendo Switch. In the latter, he and Bowser created a device with a battery having Magikoopa's magic to trap inside Mario and Sonic, only for Luigi to accidentally turning on the device, trapping Mario, Sonic, Toad, Bowser, and Eggman.

Eggman also appears in the crossover title Lego Dimensions, with Mike Pollock reprising his role as part of the level "Sonic Dimensions", in which he attempts to use the game's Keystone Devices to conquer multiple dimensions and defeat Sonic; a haunted parade balloon based on Eggman also appears as a boss in the game's Ghostbusters 2016 story pack's fourth level, "Breaking the Barrier". He appears as a trophy in both Super Smash Bros. Brawl and Super Smash Bros. for Nintendo 3DS and Wii U, as well as a spirit in Super Smash Bros. Ultimate. In 2026, Eggman was added as a cosmetic character outfit in Fortnite Battle Royale.

The only game to feature Robotnik as the central character is the 1993 puzzle game Dr. Robotnik's Mean Bean Machine, in which Robotnik's Adventures of Sonic the Hedgehog's version, along with his numerous Badnik bounty hunters seen in the first episode of the same show, attempts to get rid of all the fun and music on the planet Mobius by kidnapping the citizens of an insignificant town and turning them into robots. Despite being the title character, he remains the villain and is the final boss.

Sonic and the Black Knight is the only game in the entire Sonic franchise series in which Eggman does not make a physical appearance or receive mention. However, the game makes small references to the character, including a collectible item bearing his emblem, an in-game mission featuring his robots as enemies, and unlockable fan art of the character.

Eggman also appeared in Sonic and the Secret Rings, where he assumes the role of Shahryār of Persia.

Eggman appeared in Sonic Rush and Rush Adventure, where he is once again the main antagonist, alongside a parallel version of himself called Eggman Nega. Eggman also appeared in Sonic Rivals 1 and 2, with Eggman Nega appearing as the main villain. Eggman is also a playable character in the Sonic Chronicles: The Dark Brotherhood RPG.

Eggman is the hidden main antagonist of the murder mystery game The Murder of Sonic the Hedgehog.

=== In other media ===
==== Television ====
Milton Knight's rendition of Eggman (right) was widely used in the Anglosphere until 1998.

Dr. Eggman, under the "Robotnik" moniker, appeared as the main antagonist of two Sonic the Hedgehog animated television series that premiered in 1993. In the Saturday morning ABC series Sonic the Hedgehog, he was given the first name "Julian", and he was voiced by Jim Cummings. He was also redesigned by DIC Entertainment to have warlord-like garb, a longer cape, a pointier head, red irises, and a fully mechanized arm. His appearance in the syndicated weekday series Adventures of Sonic the Hedgehog was designed by cartoonist Milton Knight, and his voice was provided by blues musician Long John Baldry. He was depicted in a goofier, flamboyant style to reflect Adventures' more comedic tone; Knight gave a greater deal of focus to his physical and emotional state, describing him as "animation's sexiest fat man":

Robotnik is... the perfect image of self love... he's not perfect, he's imperfect... his full blown belief in himself. He is actually extremely excited by the fact that he exists, and the fact the others do not feel the same way simply spurns him on to greater heights of villainy. He is jealous of the hedgehog — why should he get the applause? Give it to Robotnik! He really believes in his own romantic self and... his sexiness.

— Milton Knight

Robotnik also served as the main antagonist of the 1999 series Sonic Underground, in which he was voiced by Garry Chalk.

In the 2-part episode Sonic the Hedgehog OVA, Robotnik (or "Eggman" in the original) tells Sonic that he has been banished from "Eggmanland" ("Robotropolis" in the dub) by a metallic doppelgänger of himself called "Black Eggman" ("Metal Robotnik" in the dub). It is later revealed that the mecha was piloted by Eggman himself, in a scheme to lure Sonic into his base and copy his DNA for his new Hyper Metal Sonic robot. Eggman was voiced by Junpei Takiguchi in the Japanese version and by Edwin Neal in the English dub.

In Sonic X, Dr. Eggman (which he is usually referred to as in this series, though his real last name in-universe is Robotnik as in the games), is as always the primary antagonist throughout Seasons 1 and 2. In the premiere episode, Eggman, alongside his lackey robots Decoe, Bocoe, and Bokkun, have collected the Chaos Emeralds and kidnapped Cream the Rabbit for an unknown scheme, only for Sonic to confront him and damage his latest machine. The malfunctioning device induces an explosive domed variant of Chaos Control that accidentally transports Eggman, Sonic, and Sonic's friends from their own world Mobius to Earth. Eggman then endeavors to take over Earth instead, only to constantly be foiled by Sonic and Co., now joined by human boy Chris Thorndyke and his family and friends. In the second season, which adapts the events of Sonic Adventure, Sonic Adventure 2, and Sonic Battle, Eggman discovers the existence of the ancient entity Chaos and frees it only to be betrayed by it, leaving Super Sonic to defeat and pacify it. Later on, Eggman discovers the Ultimate Lifeform, Project Shadow, hidden in a G.U.N. facility, revealed as a hedgehog resembling Sonic named Shadow. Eggman and Shadow find and reactivate a hidden space station known as the Space Colony ARK. Here, it is revealed that Professor Gerald Robotnik is his grandfather and that Earth was his homeworld, having at sometime in the past traveled to Mobius and sought to conquer it, leading to his ongoing conflict with Sonic and Co.. Eggman again tries to use the Chaos Emeralds to power the ARK's Eclipse Cannon in order to threaten the Earth into surrendering to his rule, only to trigger a failsafe put in place by a vengeful Gerald to activate and crash the ARK into the Earth and cause a mass extinction event, leading Shadow and Sonic to team up and destroy the BioLizard, the prototype Ultimate Lifeform who means to see Gerald's revenge through. In the final season, Eggman returns to Mobius with Sonic and friends with intent to resume his campaigns for conquering Mobius, only to reluctantly joins forces with Sonic and his friends to fight a mechanical alien menace known as the Metarex. This incarnation of Eggman is voiced by Chikao Ōtsuka in the Japanese version, and by Mike Pollock in the English dub.

Dr. Eggman appears as the primary antagonist of the Sonic Boom animated series, with Mike Pollock reprising his voice role. Eggman's physical appearance was the most drastically changed of the cast, now appearing to have a buff upper body and wearing a militaristic uniform, as well as having a smoother mustache. He also appears to be less serious than his mainstream counterpart.

Dr. Eggman makes a handful of appearances in the anime Hi-sCoool! SeHa Girls. In the middle of the Sega Hard Girls' first exam in the game Border Break, Eggman hacks into the game world and begins to wreak havoc until Sonic appears. He leads Sonic and the girls on a chase through several Sonic the Hedgehog games until they finally defeat him using an invincibility power-up. He later appears in the final episode to wish the girls farewell at their graduation.

Dr. Eggman appears as the primary antagonist of the Sonic Prime animated series, having tricked Sonic into breaking open a hidden catacomb in Green Hill Zone housing an ancient gemstone known as the Paradox Prism. After Sonic shatters the Prism, it results in the creation of multiple dimensions known as Shatterspaces, with one being New Yoke City, a dystopian version of Green Hill ruled by the evil Chaos Council formed by five alternative versions of Eggman. The members are: the infant Dr. Babble, the lazy teenage Dr. Don't, the philosophic Dr. Deep, the elderly Dr. Done It, and Mr. Dr. Eggman, the head of the council and the closest variant to the original Eggman. The council intends to recover all of the Prism shards and conquer the Shatterverse. Brian Drummond voices Dr. Eggman, Mr. Dr. Eggman, and Dr. Done It, while Vincent Tong voices Dr. Babble, Dr. Don't, and Dr. Deep.

==== Comics ====
When the first Sonic the Hedgehog title was released in 1991, Sega of America developed an origin for Sonic the Hedgehog and Dr. Robotnik which diverged from the backstories created in Japan by Sonic Team. In this new backstory, set on the planet Mobius, Dr. Ivo Robotnik was originally a benevolent scientist named Dr. Ovi Kintobor ("Ivo" and "Robotnik" backwards; "ovi-" is also a prefix meaning "egg"), a friend to Sonic who helped to develop the hedgehog's super-speed. Kintobor was transformed into Robotnik by a laboratory accident involving the Chaos Emeralds and a rotten egg, becoming his own evil opposite who frequently used egg-related puns in his dialogue. This story was first featured in a 14-page promotional comic book published by Sega in the United States, though with alterations to downplay the rotten egg, such as excluding any egg puns and having a spilled soda cause the explosion. The comic was written by Francis Mao, and was designed to promote the game, but would go on to greater fame in the United Kingdom, where it would be used by the vast majority of local publications, including the guidebook Stay Sonic, a series of novels from Virgin Books, and Fleetway Publications' Sonic the Comic, which was published from 1993 until 2002. In Sonic the Comic, Dr. Robotnik was the dictator of the planet Mobius for most of the comic's first 100 issues, while Sonic also had access to an AI computer program based on Dr. Kintobor. Initially, Robotnik's appearance in Sonic the Comic matched that of the American box art of the video games, resembling the Japanese design, but with no gloves, an orange moustache, and black eyes. Starting from issue 9, Robotnik's design was altered to include elements from his “Adventures of Sonic the Hedgehog” design, design issue #22 had him physically transform into the cartoon series design. In the last few issues, Robotnik, having gone insane from constant defeats, adopted his modern era outfit while still restraining his physical appearance from AoSTH, and attempted to wipe out all life on Mobius, but eventually failing

From 1993 to 2017, Archie Comics published a Sonic the Hedgehog comic book. The series is, in a sense, a very loose continuation of ABC's Sonic the Hedgehog animated cartoon; as well as a mad scientist, Robotnik, inheriting the first name “Julian” from Satam, but also including the last name “Kintobor” from Fleetway, is a portrayed as a dictator who took control of Sonic's hometown during a coup d'état. At the height of this conflict, Robotnik died during a final confrontation with Sonic, but was later replaced by another Robotnik from a parallel world, becoming the same Dr. Eggman from the video games. In later years, the plot of the comic changed to incorporate elements from the video games, with Robotnik being replaced by his more traditional video game counterpart. However, due to legal disputes with former writer Ken Penders, Archie Comics eventually cancelled the comic and ended their partnership with Sega.

Sega later announced a partnership with IDW Publishing, intending to launch a brand new comic book separate from the Archie comic. The IDW comic is depicted taking place after Sonic Forces, where Dr. Eggman had been flung into a village following his final battle with Sonic, having sustained amnesia as a result. Having become friendly and innovative, Eggman even reinforces the cell he was kept in. Deeming him a new man, the mayor releases him, where he takes up the name "Mr. Tinker", as their residential handyman. During this time, he would create a robotic, wooden doll named Belle, who would go on to be a major character in the series later. When Sonic finally locates him, he is skeptical of his nemesis' supposed change of heart, but is convinced of his reformation after seeing Mr. Tinker protect the children from a Badnik horde, even protecting him against Shadow the Hedgehog. Mr. Tinker reveals that his new "Eggmanland" is simply a small amusement park for the children, and Sonic thus allows him to remain in the village. It's revealed that the mysterious figure directing the Eggman Empire in Eggman's stead is in fact Metal Sonic, who has been upgraded into his Neo form from Sonic Heroes once more. Neo Metal Sonic plans to retrieve Eggman so that he may resume command of his Empire, unaware of Mr. Tinker. The peace is short-lived, as upstart villain Dr. Starline finds Mr. Tinker and reawakens the Eggman persona. Eggman then proceeds with a plan to infect the world with a "Metal Virus" that converts organic matter into a robotic form. Quickly covering most of the planet, Eggman is unconcerned when it is discovered that his control over the new robotic life forms has become less effective, prompting Starline to betray him by summoning the Deadly Six. Eggman ultimately teams up with Sonic to defeat Zavok and neutralize the Metal Virus.

Eggman also appears in the crossover comic book series DC x Sonic the Hedgehog. In the first miniseries Chaos Crisis, he initially assists Sonic and his friends and the Justice League in launching an assault on the Ragna Rock to stop Darkseid, until (after Sonic and his friends are warped into the League's universe, and Darkseid is trapped between dimensions) he settles to take advantage of their absence to continue his plans, only to be stopped by Superman. Later after Darkseid is defeated, Eggman is shown to have landed in the League's universe, and formed an alliance with Lex Luthor. Returning as one of the main antagonists in the sequel miniseries Metal Legion, Eggman joins the Legion of Doom in an effort to defeat the superheroes, although he later betrays the Legion by creating the Metal Legion, a horde of robotic duplicates of the villains, and converting the Hall of Doom into the "Doom Egg".

==== Film ====
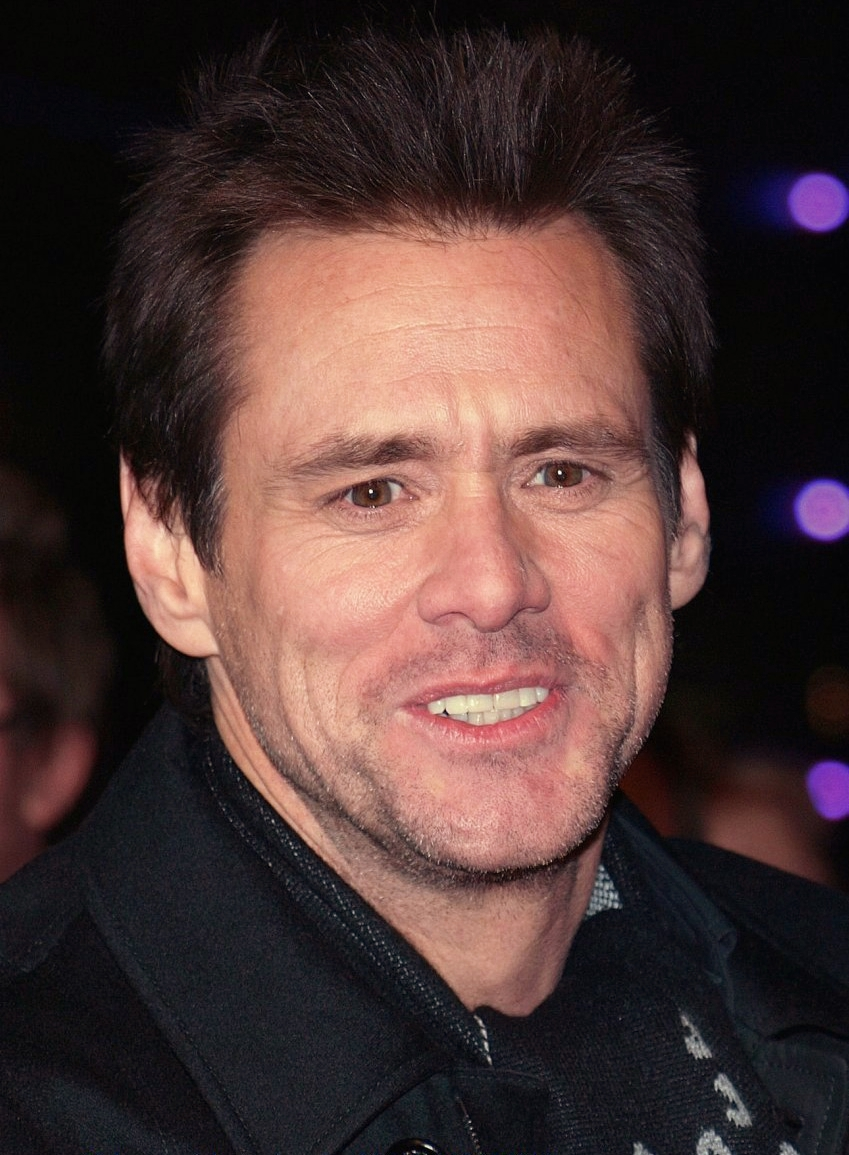
Actor Jim Carrey (pictured in 2008) portrays Dr. Eggman in the live-action film series.

Eggman appears in the 2012 Disney movie Wreck-It Ralph, which is set in an arcade where the characters native to the machines interact with one another in communal settings after the arcade closes each day. In the movie, Eggman appears in his current design from the "modern" Sonic games, both in person as a member of the villain support group "Bad-Anon", and as a Caricature hanging on the Celebrity Wall of Tapper's, a bar located inside a Tapper arcade machine. In the ending credits of the film, he appears in a brief pixel-art styled scene, using his in-game design from Sonic the Hedgehog 3. Eggman also makes a cameo appearance in the 2018 sequel Ralph Breaks the Internet.

Dr. Ivo "Eggman" Robotnik appears in the theatrical Sonic the Hedgehog film released by Paramount Pictures in 2020, with Jim Carrey portraying a live-action version of the character. In the film, he is referred to almost exclusively as Robotnik, and is depicted as a twisted scientist hired by the United States Department of Defense to hunt down Sonic after the latter caused a power outage across the Pacific Northwest. Eventually, he receives the moniker "Eggman" from Sonic after the egg-shaped designs of his robots. His appearance is similar to that of his Sonic '06 appearance, being relatively thin with normal human proportions. He works alongside his loyal assistant, Agent Stone. Robotnik uses one of Sonic's quills to power up his machines to match Sonic's speed, but is eventually defeated by Sonic. He is transported to a planet filled with mushrooms, where he shaves his head and grows out his moustache over the course of 87 days, making him further resemble his in-game appearances, as he plots his revenge against Sonic.

By the second film, Robotnik had spent 243 days (about eight months) on the mushroom planet. In the events of the film, he teams up with Knuckles to defeat Sonic and locate the Master Emerald. Upon locating the Emerald, Robotnik betrays Knuckles and absorbs it, intending to use its power to conquer the universe. In Green Hills, he uses his new powers to create a giant robotic replica of himself (which resembles the Death Egg robot from the games), but is defeated after Knuckles knocks the Master Emerald out of him and Sonic uses the Chaos Emeralds to transform into Super Sonic and destroy the robot. Robotnik's whereabouts and living status are unknown by the end of the film. Although not said on screen, the full name of the character as written in the movie's novelization is listed as "Ivo Gerald Robotnik", his middle name being taken from his grandfather.

In February 2024, it was announced that Carrey would be reprising his role for the third film, which was released on December 20, 2024. In the time since his last defeat, Robotnik has taken up refuge, watches telenovelas and eats junk food, giving him his distinguished belly. In an effort to stop Shadow the Hedgehog, he forms an alliance with Sonic, but betrays him upon learning his grandfather Gerald Robotnik is working with Shadow to activate the Eclipse Cannon, an advanced space weapon. Much to the dismay of Agent Stone, Robotnik develops a close connection with Gerald. Robotnik turns on Gerald upon learning he intends on using the Eclipse Cannon to completely annihilate the Earth as revenge for his late granddaughter Maria's death. In an ensuing battle between grandfather and grandson, Gerald nearly kills Robotnik, but is saved by Tails and Knuckles who help him kill Gerald. Realizing that he only has the option to save the Earth rather than conquer it, Robotnik helps Tails and Knuckles steer the Eclipse Cannon away from the Earth during its firing sequence, accidentally slicing off part of the Moon. When the Eclipse Cannon's reactor core begins to melt down and is set to explode, Shadow proceeds to push it away from Earth while Robotnik attempts to stabilize the reactor. In his final moments, Robotnik broadcasts a message to Stone, proclaiming his friendship and appreciation for him, before the Eclipse Cannon explodes with him still inside. At the 2025 Kids' Choice Awards, Carrey won the "Favorite Villain" award for his dual role as Ivo and Gerald, respectively, in the third Sonic film.

== Reception and legacy ==
Reception to the character has been very positive, with Dr. Robotnik going on to become one of the most well-known villains in gaming. GameDaily ranked him number one on their list of the "Top 25 Evil Masterminds of All Time", stating "Out of all the evil masterminds in video games, none are more despicable, more cunning, or more menacing". They also included him in their most persistent video game villains list and their craziest video game villains list. In a later article, they listed the "evil mastermind" as one of the top 25 video game archetypes, using Robotnik as an example. He was featured at number three in a "Reader's Choice" edition of GameSpot's "Top Ten Video Game Villains" article, which noted a massive complaint by fans at his exclusion from the original list. Eggman was also named the 15th most diabolical video game villain of all time by PC World. Game Informer notes that in Sonic Chronicles: The Dark Brotherhood, "Eggman's villain ego shows some amusing tarnish after constant defeat at the hands of Sonic." IGN listed him at number nine above Mario-series villain Bowser in their "Top 10 Most Memorable Villains" article, calling him "PETA's videogame public enemy number one", and has also commented that his character is a "pretty clever riff on Teddy Roosevelt" that has added to the attraction of the series. Guinness World Records Gamer's Edition listed Dr. Eggman as 43rd in their list of "top 50 video game villains". In 2010, IGN listed Dr. Robotnik 11th out of their "Top 100 Videogame Villains". Nintendo Power listed Dr. Robotnik as their seventh favorite villain, also listing him as having one of the best mustaches.

A macrocyclic molecule discovered by a Harvard University research team to potentially inhibit the protein Sonic hedgehog was named "Robotnikinin" after the Dr. Robotnik character. The researchers felt that since Sonic hedgehog was named after the Sega video game character, they should "adhere to the convention" in naming the inhibiting compound after the character's archenemy.

The power metal band Powerglove wrote a song called "So Sexy Robotnik" based on the boss theme from Sonic the Hedgehog 2; the song features snips from various other level tunes from the same game. It appears as the first track on their 2007 album Metal Kombat for the Mortal Man.

== See also ==
- List of Sonic the Hedgehog characters
