= Sonic Blast =

1996 video game

- North American Game Gear cover art
- Developer: Aspect
- Publishers: Sega; Tec Toy (Master System)
- Director: Ryushin Hamada
- Producer: Hiroshi Aso
- Designers: Fumikazu Sugawara; Taro Murayama
- Programmers: Toshiaki Araki; Yoshiaki Makishima
- Composer: Kojiro Mikusa
- Series: Sonic the Hedgehog
- Platforms: Game Gear, Master System
- Release: Game Gear: NA: November 1996; EU: November 28, 1996; JP: December 13, 1996; Master System: BR: December 1997
- Genre: Platform
- Mode: Single-player

Sonic Blast (Note: Known in Japan as G Sonic (Ｇソニック, Jī Sonikku)) is a 1996 platform game developed by Aspect and published by Sega for the Game Gear. The player controls Sonic the Hedgehog and Knuckles the Echidna, who venture through 15 levels to stop Doctor Robotnik from using Chaos Emerald shards to fortify his base. As a Sonic the Hedgehog series platformer, the characters run and jump to reach the end of a level while defeating enemy robots and collecting rings. In separate special stages, the player must run forward and collect rings to earn one of the Chaos Emerald shards.

The game was the final Sonic the Hedgehog game for the system, utilizing pre-rendered visuals to maximize the graphical potential of the decreasingly popular handheld console. It was rereleased on the Master System exclusively in Brazil in 1997, various compilations in the series, and the Nintendo 3DS's Virtual Console (2012). Despite their similar titles and coinciding releases, Sonic Blast and Sonic 3D Blast have little in common. Retrospective reviewers generally had little praise for Sonic Blast and have deemed it one of the series' worst games. Although some considered its graphics impressive when considering the technological restrictions of the Game Gear, most found its animations and colors mediocre. The level designs and slow gameplay were also criticized.

== Gameplay ==
Sonic in the game's second level

Sonic Blast is a 2D side-scrolling platform game. Its story begins when Doctor Robotnik shatters a Chaos Emerald into five shards with a laser. One of the shards hits Sonic the Hedgehog, who, with the help of Knuckles the Echidna, sets out to prevent Robotnik from collecting the other shards and fortifying his island base. Sonic and Knuckles serve as the player-characters of the single-player game. Sonic, in addition to his spinning attacks from prior Sonic games, has a special double-jump that gives him a secondary jump in midair. Knuckles retains his abilities from Sonic & Knuckles: like Sonic, he can perform spin attacks, but can also glide through the air and climb up walls when he hits them in midair. The player travels through 15 levels (called "zones"), across five parts called acts. Every third zone contains a boss fight against Robotnik and one of his larger robots. Zones range from the traditional Green Hill Zone to underwater ruins, and feature vertical loops, slides, and teleporters.

In the Sonic series tradition, Sonic and Knuckles collect rings as a form of health. Rings serve as protection for the animals, defending them from the attacks of robot enemies. When taking damage, ten rings scatter across the stage and can be recollected before they disappear. The player starts the game with several lives, which are lost if the player is crushed, drowns, falls into a bottomless pit, or is hit with no rings in their possession. Losing all lives results in a game over, after which the player is returned to the title screen and must restart the game. Power-ups hidden in television monitors provide Sonic and Knuckles numerous boons, including more rings, a burst of speed, shields, invincibility, extra lives, and the ability to save progress in a level. Some monitors, however, contain Robotnik's face and do not grant the player anything. Others contain question marks, which grant any of the power-ups. At the end of an act, the player must hit a signpost to complete the level. The signpost will spin until it lands on an image; the image will grant the player a reward. (Note: The signpost images are of Robotnik, a ring, Sonic, Knuckles, a Chaos Emerald, or Super Sonic.)

Similar in fashion to Sonic the Hedgehog 3, giant rings leading to special stages are hidden around levels. The special stages follow the same basic format of those in Sonic the Hedgehog 2: the player-character runs forward and must collect rings to meet a required amount. They must avoid bombs, and sometimes will jump, run on boost panels, or hop on springs to get more rings. Successful completion of special stages will grant the characters extra lives, rings, or one of the Chaos Emerald shards.

== Development and release ==
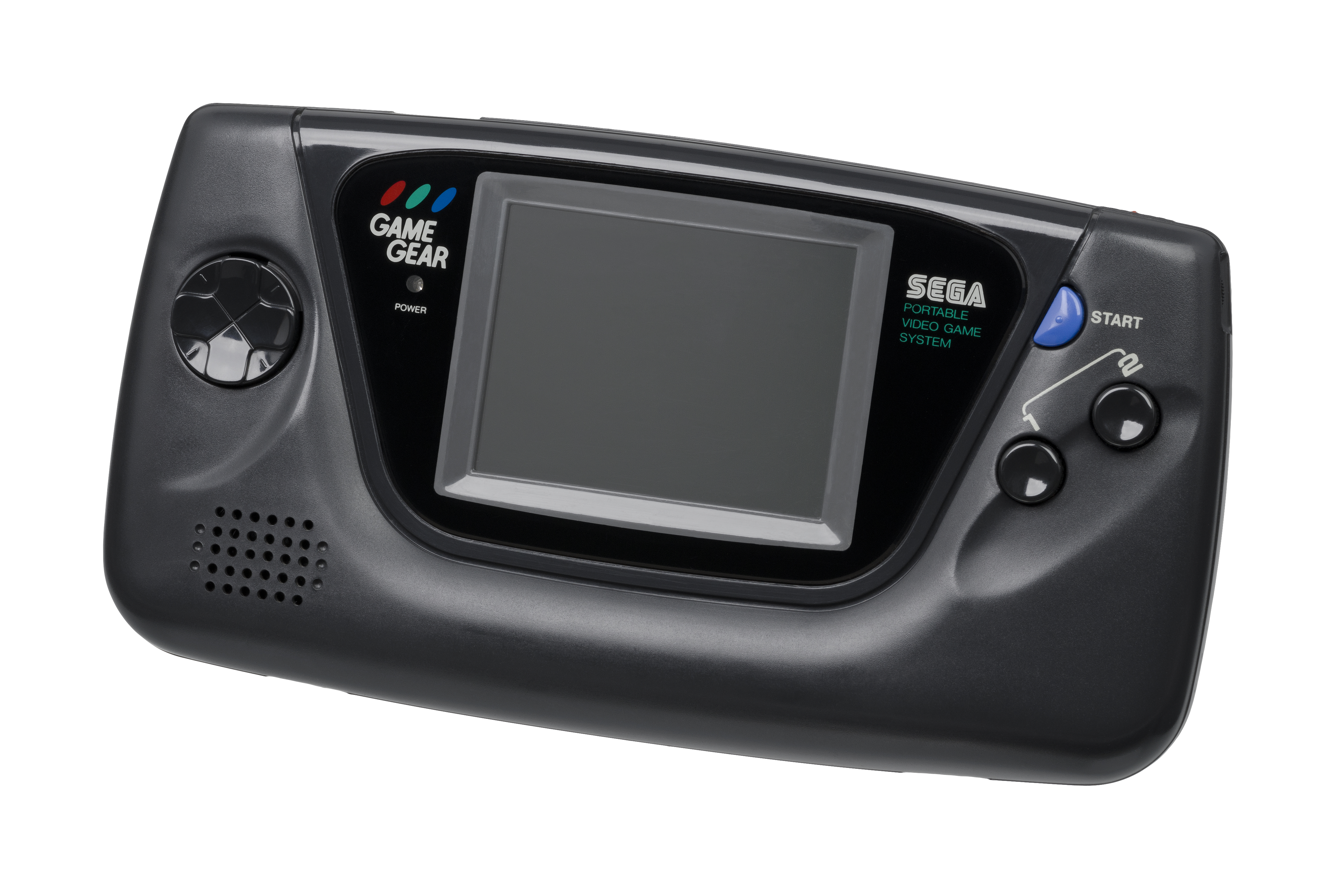
Sonic Blast was the final Sonic the Hedgehog game for the Game Gear.

Sonic Blast was the sixth and final Sonic the Hedgehog platformer released for the Game Gear. It was developed alongside other outsourced titles in the series, including Minato Gaiken's Sonic Labyrinth and Traveller's Tales' Sonic 3D Blast. Like the previous Game Gear titles, Sonic Blast was developed by Aspect and published by Sega. Key staff from Aspect's prior Sonic games did not work on Sonic Blast. A prominent feature of the game is its pre-rendered visuals, which had been popularized by Donkey Kong Country (1994). The graphics were rendered in 3D before being converted into sprites; the final result has been compared to that of Donkey Kong Country and Mortal Kombat (1992). However, the visuals presented some limitations: Sonic and Knuckles have few animation frames, there is no timer, and the player only loses ten rings when hit. Several gameplay elements were reused from Sonic the Hedgehog 3 and Sonic & Knuckles, such as Sonic's double-jump (Note: In Sonic the Hedgehog 3, Sonic can double-jump when he equips a certain shield; Sonic Blast included the double-jump as a standard ability.) and the playable characters.

Sonic Blast was released in North America in November 1996, in Europe on November 28, 1996, and in Japan as part of the Kid's Gear brand on December 13, 1996, retitled G Sonic. It was the system's final game released in Japan. Though they have similar titles and were released around the same time, Sonic Blast and Sonic 3D Blast have little in common. The game is fairly common in North America, but G Sonic is extremely rare, costing almost US$350. A port of the game was released for the Master System exclusively in Brazil in December 1997, distributed by Tec Toy. The game had to be simplified to run on the Master System because of its lower graphical quality. Like G Sonic, the Master System version of Sonic Blast is rare.

The game has been rereleased in emulated form several times. The Game Gear version was included as an unlockable bonus in Sonic Adventure DX: Director's Cut (2003) as one of the eleven unlockable Sonic Game Gear games, and in Sonic Mega Collection Plus (2004) for the PlayStation 2, Xbox, and Windows. It was rereleased for the Nintendo 3DS's Virtual Console in Japan on April 18, 2012, followed by Europe on June 14, 2012, and then in North America on June 20, 2013. It was also released along with the other 11 Game Gear Sonic games on Sonic Origins Plus on June 23, 2023.

== Reception and legacy ==
Reception (3DS)

Review scores
Publication	Score
Famitsu	5/10, 5/10, 5/10, 6/10
Jeuxvideo.com	9/20
Nintendo Life	6/10
Nintendo World Report	4/10
Digitally Downloaded	2/5

Retrospective reviewers did not remember Sonic Blast fondly. Nintendo World Report (NWR) summarized the game as "a step back" from the other Game Gear Sonic titles, due to what they called "the attempt at aping Donkey Kong Country's pre-rendered sprites on a handheld".

Most critics disliked the graphics, some claiming they ruined the game. Digitally Downloaded called the visuals more distracting than impressive—hampering the fluidity of the gameplay and preventing the use of integral series elements—while Nintendo Life thought the game aged badly when compared to the other Sonic Game Gear games with its "muddy colours and shaky animation". Some, such as writers from USgamer and NWR, complained the character graphics were too big for the Game Gear's small screen. Jeuxvideo.com found the character animations poor and said they caused gameplay limitations. Although they were mostly critical of the graphics, reviewers did acknowledge the visuals were impressive when considering the limitations of the Game Gear. Pocket Gamer noted that prior to the game's release, "the capabilities of [the Game Gear] had seemingly been fully explored", writing while they offered some compromises, the visuals made Sonic Blast stand out.

The gameplay was also criticized. NWR wrote that the characters' abilities were difficult to use properly since the screen was zoomed so close to them and particularly disliked the water-based levels, calling them nearly unplayable due to sluggish controls. Nintendo Life held considerable grievances against the inconsistent and random level designs, while Jeuxvideo.com lamented the game lacked the speed previous Sonic games offered, and said the playable characters' abilities, as well as losing only ten rings when hit, made an already-easy game easier. They shared Nintendo Life's concerns about the level designs, and argued the boss fights lacked difficulty. Digitally Downloaded said the game lacked polish: "were you to convert Sonic Blast into the engine of one of the other Game Gear games, its shortcomings would still be prevalent." However, Pocket Gamer praised the game's take on the traditional Sonic formula, calling it "a strong choice for anyone who's enjoyed any other 2D [Sonic game]". Digitally Downloaded, although overall critical, praised the game for its elements of exploration.

Sonic Blast has been called one of the worst games in the Sonic series. NWR exclaimed the game "should be avoided at all costs", and Retro Gamer said its title screen was the only redeeming quality. USgamer wrote it was "an unpleasant end to the Game Gear" and attributed its shortcomings to the system's discontinuation. Complex Networks declared it "the worst handheld Sonic game ever" and said "thank God they didn't attempt the '3D' aspect of its 16-bit older brother". Some reviewers noted Sonic Blast was the first game to give Sonic the standard ability to double-jump, which would be used in later games such as Sonic Colors (2010).
