= Flicky =

1984 video game

- Arcade flyer
- Developer: Sega
- Publishers: Sega; Bally Midway
- Designer: Yoji Ishii
- Artist: Yoshiki Kawasaki
- Platforms: Arcade, SG-1000, Genesis, FM-7, MSX, PC-8801, Sharp X1, mobile
- Release: Arcade: JP: May 1984; NA: 1984; SG-1000: JP: December 1984; Genesis: JP: January 1991; WW: 1991
- Genre: Platform
- Mode: Single-player
- Arcade system: Sega System 1

Flicky (Note: Japanese: フリッキー, Hepburn: Furikkī) is a platform game developed by Sega and released as an arcade video game in May 1984. It was licensed to Bally Midway for distribution in the United States. In Flicky, the player controls the eponymous blue bird and must gather all the small birds called Chirps in each round and bring them safely to the exit. There are cat and lizard enemies which can disperse the Chirps and kill the player, but Flicky can use items on the playing field to protect herself and the Chirps from danger.

The idea for Flicky came from Sega senior leadership, who wanted to exceed the success of Namco's Mappy (1983). Yoji Ishii and Yoshiki Kawasaki developed Flicky at Sega over one year. Originally, the game simply had the player catch ambiguous dots in a maze. Taking inspiration from a popular song in a Japanese variety show, Kawasaki gave the game an urban theme and bird characters. The game was originally titled "Busty", then "Flippy", before finally settling on "Flicky".

Flicky was first ported to the SG-1000 in Japan, and then later to other Japanese home consoles. In 1991, Flicky was released in North America and Europe on the Sega Genesis. The character has made cameo appearances in other Sega games, most notably within the Sonic the Hedgehog series.

== Gameplay ==
Flicky being followed by four Chirps on a platform above the exit door

Flicky is a platform game in which the player takes control of a flightless blue sparrow bird named Flicky. With only the ability to run side-to-side and jump, the player must collect all the small, yellow birds called "Chirps" and take them to the exit to clear each round. According to game artist Yoshiki Kawasaki, Flicky is just a friend to the Chirps although some players may think she is a mother to them. The Chirps follow Flicky in a chain until they are collected at the exit. Bonus points are awarded for bringing multiple Chirps back in a single chain. There are 48 total stages. Each stage takes place on a single wraparound screen that scrolls horizontally with Flicky always in the center. After all the stages are completed, the game loops infinitely on an increased difficulty mode.

Collected Chirps will disperse if their chain comes in contact with an enemy. Some of the chirps wear sunglasses; these chirps behave more unpredictably when dispersed. There are two enemy types in the standard rounds, house cats called Tigers and green iguanas called Iggys. These enemies can be simply avoided but can also be defeated with throwable items available on some levels. These items include telephones, flower pots, cups, and bottles. Flicky can pick up an item by walking into it, and throw it by jumping. Sometimes diamonds may appear, which cannot be thrown but rather provide bonus points. There are also bonus rounds in which Flicky attempts to catch as many falling Chirps as possible in a net.

== Development ==
The spark to develop Flicky came from Sega's desire to exceed Namco's Mappy (1983) which had become very popular in Japanese arcades. Sega game designer Yoji Ishii's boss wanted him to design a similar "dot eater" game but better. Ishii (who later designed Sega's Fantasy Zone) led the development team.

Flicky was developed over the course of one year and was designed by Yoji Ishii in collaboration with artist Yoshiki Kawasaki. The game evolved from a simple game that Kawasaki first envisioned where the player would catch dots in a maze. He took inspiration from a popular song about sparrows on power lines from a 1970s Japanese variety show, Migoro! Tabegoro! Waraigoro!, (Note: The show is titled みごろ！たべごろ！笑いごろ！in Japanese. The particular song about the sparrows is called 電線音頭.) and so made the main character a sparrow and the platforms and walls wires. However, he found the power line theme boring, and thus changed the background to an apartment building after taking inspiration from one outside his office window. Kawasaki felt that anyone who is around children has experienced the emotion of wanting to keep children safe from the outside and returning them safe to their home. From this, the team wanted to imbue a message to "protect the children" with the game, and according to Kawasaki, "it's that emotion that drives Flicky".

Kawasaki used a poorly calibrated graphics tablet to draw all the game graphics. The Chirps were originally ambiguous dots that would disappear when collected. Kawasaki changed this so the dots trailed the player, then increased their size to 8x8 pixels to make way for a more interesting design. The size was just large enough for a simple chick design. To add difficulty to the game, some Chirps were programmed to behave more unpredictably when touched by an enemy. These Chirps were given sunglasses and deemed the "bad" Chirps. When game testing began, the team had created 100 levels but only four background designs, and there was barely any space left in the game. Kawasaki was able to change the colors of the backgrounds to create more variety. After testing, Iggy was added to the game.

Flicky was originally titled "Busty", but an American Sega branch asked the team to change it because of the term's slang usage in English. The game was then titled "Flippy" but this was changed shortly before release. In 2002, Ishii stated this was because of trademark issues in the United States, but in 2018 said it was because "Flippy" was too similar to "Mappy". Flicky was released in arcades in May 1984.

== Ports ==
Flicky was ported to the SG-1000 console. The port only retains 40 of the arcade levels, with some of them restructured, and does not feature the Iggy enemy. In addition, the behavior of the Chirps is slightly modified and some of the graphics were changed. This version was later ported to several other home platforms in Japan including the MSX, Sharp X1, Fujitsu FM-7 and NEC PC-8801. In January 1991, Flicky was made available as a downloadable release for the Sega Meganet service for modem-equipped Sega Mega Drive systems. This version was subsequently released as a retail cartridge in North America and Europe in the same year.

== Reception ==
Contemporary Genesis reviews

Review scores
Publication	Score
ACE	4/5
Computer and Video Games	84%
Electronic Gaming Monthly	20/40 (Note: Four reviewers provided individual scores of 6, 5, 5 and 5 out of 10.)
Mean Machines Sega	88%
Mean Machines	92%
MegaTech	88%

In July 1984, Game Machine listed Flicky as being the second most popular table arcade unit in Japan during that period.

The Genesis port of Flicky was reviewed by multiple Western publications, most of which found the game to have highly addictive and enjoyable gameplay while criticizing it for having poor graphics and sound. Reviewers noted poor initial impressions based on appearance and sound, finding the sprites to be simple, the colors garish, and the music repetitive. However, when they began to play the game, they found that the simple appearance complemented the simple yet engaging gameplay. Computer and Video Games described Flicky as a guilty pleasure and discussed its cute appearance in positive light. Reviewers from Electronic Gaming Monthly concluded that the game was aimed for children based on the game's cuteness aesthetic, and provided lower scores accordingly. Critics from both Computer and Video Games and Mean Machines wrote that employees in their offices were disappearing into their game room to play Flicky. Julian from Mean Machines wrote: "It's crazy, I know, that a game so crappy, so laughably-simple and pathetic sounding as this can prove to be more addictive, more challenging and more long-lasting than virtually any other Mega Drive game, but it's true." In 2017, GamesRadar ranked Flicky 42nd on their "Best Sega Genesis/Mega Drive games of all time."

== Legacy ==
Numerous Sega video game compilations feature Flicky. A CD-enhanced version of the Genesis port was featured in Wondermega Collection, a compilation bundled with the Wondermega hybrid console in 1992. Wondermega Collection will be included as part of the Sega Mega Drive Mini 2 mini console in Japan, releasing in October 2022. The Genesis version was compiled into Game no Kanzume Vol. 1 (1994), a Sega CD compilation in Japan which featured CD quality remixes of the original soundtrack. The Genesis port was also featured in Sonic Mega Collection (2002), Sega Genesis Collection (2006), Sonic's Ultimate Genesis Collection (2009), Sega Mega Drive Classic Collection (2010), and even Genesis-based plug and play devices. The arcade version has been released in Japan on the Sega Ages: Memorial Collection Vol. 1 (1996) for the Sega Saturn, and the Sega Memorial Selection (1998) for Windows. Flicky has also been ported to mobile devices. The first port was in 2001 for the Sega Ages line in Japan. In March 2003, a similar variant appeared on the Sonic Cafe service, again exclusive to Japan. In 2007, the Sonic Cafe port was upgraded with better graphics and ported to North America for the Sega Mobile service. The Genesis port was released on Steam in 2010.

Flicky is on the arcade marquee for Bloxeed.

The Flicky character has made cameo appearances in several other Sega arcade games, effectively becoming a mascot for Sega's early arcade years. In Teddy Boy Blues (1985), she appears as a shooting target among other Sega mascots such as Pengo. In the puzzle game Bloxeed, she can be used as a special weapon to drop blocks on the playing field. She is also playable in SDI (1987) with the use of a cheat code. Flicky has a minor cameo appearance in Flash Point, where she will wish the player good luck before each round, and in the racing game Super Monaco GP (1989), where she appears on the racetrack banners and the game over screen. Flicky has also become an entire species and reoccurring minor character in the Sonic the Hedgehog series and is featured most prominently in Sonic 3D: Flickies' Island (1996), the game mechanics of which were inspired by Flicky. Flicky has continued to have minor cameo appearances in other Sega titles, including Shenmue (1999), Gunstar Super Heroes (2005), and Mario & Sonic at the Olympic Games (2007).
