= Sonic 3D Blast =

1996 video game

- North American Genesis cover art
- Developers: Traveller's Tales; Sonic Team
- Publisher: Sega
- Director: Takao Miyoshi
- Producers: Kats Sato; Yoji Ishii; Yutaka Sugano
- Designers: Takao Miyoshi; Kats Sato; Kenji Ono; Takashi Iizuka; Hirokazu Yasuhara
- Programmers: Sega Genesis; Jon Burton; Sega Saturn; Neil Harding; Stephen Harding
- Artist: James Cunliffe
- Composers: Sega Genesis; Jun Senoue; Tatsuyuki Maeda; Masaru Setsumaru; Seirou Okamoto; Sega Saturn; Richard Jacques
- Series: Sonic the Hedgehog
- Platforms: Sega Genesis; Sega Saturn; Windows
- Release: November 7, 1996: Sega Genesis; NA: November 7, 1996; EU: November 14, 1996 Sega Saturn; NA: November 20, 1996; EU: February 13, 1997; JP: October 14, 1999 Windows; NA: September 16, 1997; EU: September 25, 1997
- Genre: Platform
- Mode: Single-player

Sonic 3D Blast, (Note: Japanese: ソニック３(スリー)Ｄ(ディー)ブラスト, Hepburn: Sonikku Surī Dī Burasuto) known in regions outside North America as Sonic 3D: Flickies' Island, (Note: Japanese: ソニック３(スリー)Ｄ(ディー) フリッキーアイランド, Hepburn: Sonikku Surī Dī Furikkī Airando) is a 1996 platform game in the Sonic the Hedgehog series for the Sega Genesis and Sega Saturn. As Sonic the Hedgehog, the player embarks on a journey to save the Flickies, birds enslaved by Doctor Robotnik. The player must guide Sonic through a series of themed levels to collect Flickies and defeat Robotnik. Though it retains game mechanics from prior Sonic games, Sonic 3D Blast is differentiated by its 2D isometric perspective, with pre-rendered 3D models converted into sprites.

The concept for Sonic 3D Blast originated during the development of Sonic the Hedgehog 3 (1994). Most of the programming was outsourced to the British studio Traveller's Tales, as the Japanese Sonic Team staff was preoccupied with Nights into Dreams (1996). Development lasted eight months, and the team drew inspiration from Donkey Kong Country (1994) and Sonic Labyrinth (1995). Sonic 3D Blast was developed alongside the Saturn game Sonic X-treme. When X-treme was canceled, Sega commissioned a port of 3D Blast featuring improved graphics for the Saturn.

Both versions were published by Sega in November 1996, with a Windows port released the following year. Sonic 3D Blast was the final Sonic game for the Genesis, and has been re-released through Sonic compilations and digital distribution platforms. The game was commercially successful and received positive reviews for the Genesis version; critics welcomed the new gameplay style as well as the graphics and music. Subsequent releases were met with more mixed reviews, with the Saturn version being seen as too similar to the Genesis version. Retrospective reviews criticized the isometric gameplay, controls, and pace, although reception to the visuals and soundtrack remained positive. An unofficial director's cut version, featuring adjusted gameplay elements and improved controls, was released by the Genesis version's lead programmer, Jon Burton, in 2017.

== Gameplay ==
Sonic stands by a Shield monitor power-up. Sonic 3D Blast features elements similar to previous Sonic games but viewed from an isometric perspective.

Sonic 3D Blast is a platform game presented from an isometric perspective. Players control Sonic the Hedgehog, whose goal is to save the Flickies, collect the seven Chaos Emeralds, and defeat Doctor Robotnik and his robot army. Sonic retains most of his abilities from prior games: he can jump and spin in mid-air to defeat robots or hop on platforms, perform a spin-dash on the ground to gain speed, and collects rings as a form of health. Sonic can also collect power-ups, such as elemental shields, speed shoes, or invincibility, by breaking television monitors containing them.

The game is split into several levels called zones. Every zone has three acts: two standard levels, where the player must collect Flickies by defeating robots in order to proceed; and a boss fight against Robotnik, without any Flicky-collecting involved. In normal levels, once the player collects all five Flickies from each section of an act, Sonic is either further advanced into the act or taken to the next act. If Sonic and the following Flickies are hit by an obstacle or enemy, the Flickies and the rings Sonic collected will scatter. Each individual Flicky's color determines its behavior: blue, pink, and orange Flickies make an effort to find Sonic, while green and red Flickies wander off at random; the latter even jump about, making them harder to recollect. Sonic starts the game with four lives; if he is hit with no Flickies or rings in his possession, he will lose a life. Losing all lives results in a game over. Lives can be replenished by collecting a 1-up, and continues are obtained by collecting ten Sonic-shaped medals.

As with previous games, Sonic 3D Blast includes "special stages", in which the player collects Chaos Emeralds. Obtaining all seven Emeralds allows the player to play the final boss battle and discover the true ending of the game. To access these stages, the player must find one of Sonic's friends (either Tails or Knuckles the Echidna) hidden within a level, and stand next to them with at least 50 rings collected. Doing so allows the player to exchange the rings in order for the chance to play the game's special stage. During special stages, the camera shifts to behind Sonic as he runs down a preset path and must collect rings while avoiding obstacles that, when run into, make him lose rings. A certain number of rings need to be obtained at certain checkpoints to continue through the stage, and ultimately be able to make it to the end in order to receive a Chaos Emerald. Collecting all seven Chaos Emeralds also allows the "Final Fight" level to be played, consisting of a final boss fight and the good ending of the game.

== Plot ==
Doctor Robotnik discovers mysterious birds called Flickies that live on an island in an alternate dimension. He learns they can travel anywhere using large rings, so he exploits them by turning them into robots to help him search for the Chaos Emeralds. Sonic arrives at the island only to discover the presence of Robotnik, and he is tasked with saving the Flickies and defeating his nemesis.

Sonic travels through the island, saving the Flickies and clashing with Robotnik in his various machines. If the player collects all the Chaos Emeralds, Sonic proceeds into a black void, where he engages in a final battle with Robotnik, who pilots a large robot. Sonic manages to destroy the robot's weapons and defeats Robotnik, freeing the Flickies. If the player fails to collect the Emeralds, Robotnik escapes with them in his possession.

== Development ==
We'd just finished Toy Story, we were keen to get on with the new consoles, the Saturn and the PlayStation. Sega came to us and wanted a meeting. Well, of course, we'll take a meeting with Sega. They said, we want you to make a Genesis game. We really wanted to do the next-gen stuff. But then they said, it's Sonic the Hedgehog. Oh, that 16-bit game? Yeah, we can do that 16-bit game.

— Lead programmer Jon Burton in a retrospective interview with VentureBeat

Sonic 3D Blast was the final Sonic the Hedgehog game produced for the 16-bit Sega Genesis, and was developed as a swan song for the system. Sega had discontinued support for the Genesis in 1995, but produced the game because games typically sell for one to two years after their platforms' discontinuation. The basic concept was conceived by members of Sonic Team during the development of Sonic the Hedgehog 3 (1994), but most of the programming was done by the British studio Traveller's Tales because Sonic Team was developing Nights into Dreams (1996) at the time. According to founder Jon Burton, Traveller's Tales had just finished developing a Toy Story game and wanted to start developing games for 32-bit systems such as the Saturn and PlayStation. Sega, impressed with their work on Toy Story and Mickey Mania, approached them with 3D Blast; as Sonic was extremely popular at the time, the concept "got their attention". In retrospect, Burton stated that he believed the game was commissioned because Sonic X-treme, in development for the Saturn at the time, was struggling, and Sega wanted to bring Sonic into the 3D era of gaming.

The game was developed from scratch in eight months, beginning in July 1995. It was originally titled Sonic Spindrift. Burton, who served as lead programmer, implemented an exception handler where, should an error occur, the game would greet the player with a secret level select screen instead of crashing; this was done so the game could easily pass Sega's approval process for publishing games. Burton also gave the game a unique Full-motion video (FMV) intro sequence, and used compression methods to make the video fit in the 4MB cartridge and appear higher resolution. The game makes use of some pre-rendered 3D models converted into sprites. The team decided to use 3D instead of 2D because they thought "it was time for something new." Inspiration for the isometric viewpoint was drawn from Sonic Labyrinth (1995) and Super Mario RPG (1996). The item collection was influenced by the 1984 Flicky game, and the graphics were inspired by Donkey Kong Country (1994). Sonic Team provided Traveller's Tales with game, level, and character designs. Burton remembered the partnership with Sega fondly, recalling that he greatly enjoyed "making a machine do something you haven't seen it do". Towards the end of development, Traveller's Tales began to expand its scope, and Burton passed the rest of programming to his employees.

Sega also commissioned a version of the game for the Sega Saturn in case Sonic X-treme was canceled. This cancellation did indeed occur, so Sonic 3D Blast was released in time for Christmas 1996 in its place. The game was ported in seven weeks, during development of the Sega Genesis version. While it does feature graphical changes, such as weather effects and higher resolution textures, the game largely plays the same as the original version. It features a higher quality opening video and improved graphics. Sonic Team filled in for development of the special stage in the Saturn version of the game, which includes polygonal graphics as opposed to sprites only. This version is also compatible with the Saturn's analog control pad. The team attempted to rework X-treme into bonus stages in the Saturn version. However, they were unable to properly transfer Sonic's model from X-treme into 3D Blast, so the feature was scrapped.

The soundtrack for the Genesis version, which features 24 tracks in total, was primarily composed by Jun Senoue and Tatsuyuki Maeda, with Masaru Setsumaru and Seirou Okamoto composing the final boss and staff roll themes respectively. The Saturn version features a different soundtrack in CD audio by Richard Jacques and features a vocal ending theme titled "You're My Hero", performed by Debbie Morris. The musical styles on the soundtrack were described by Sega Saturn Magazine as both traditional Sonic music and "hardcore techno".

== Release ==
Sonic 3D Blast was released for the Genesis in North America on November 7, 1996, and in Europe on November 14, 1996. The launch coincided with the release of the Game Gear game Sonic Blast, which also features pre-rendered 3D graphics. The Saturn version of Sonic 3D Blast was released in North America later that year and in Europe on February 13, 1997. In Japan, the Saturn version was released on October 14, 1999 as Sonic 3D: Flickies' Island. A port of the Sega Saturn version was released for Windows in North America on September 16, 1997, followed by Europe on September 25, 1997.

The Genesis version of the game is available in several Sonic-themed compilations. These include Sonic Mega Collection (2002) for the GameCube; Sonic Mega Collection Plus (2004) for the PlayStation 2, Xbox, and Windows; Sonic's Ultimate Genesis Collection (2009) for the PlayStation 3 and Xbox 360, and Sega Genesis Classics (2018) for the Nintendo Switch, PlayStation 4, and Xbox One. It was also re-released for the Wii's Virtual Console in 2007, with Sonic 3D Blast being the Japanese title this time, and on Steam in 2010. In October 2022, it was re-released again as one of the games included on the Sega Genesis Mini 2.

== Reception ==
=== Contemporary ===
Contemporary reviews

Review scores
Publication	Score
Computer and Video Games	GEN: 4/5; SAT: 3/5
Electronic Gaming Monthly	GEN: 7/10, 7.5/10, 7.5/10, 7/10; SAT: 6/10, 7.5/10, 7/10, 6/10
Game Informer	GEN: 8/10; SAT: 7.25/10
GameSpot	SAT: 7/10; PC: 5.6/10
Mean Machines Sega	GEN: 92%
Entertainment Weekly	GEN: B SAT: C
Sega Saturn Magazine	SAT: 82%

Reception to the Genesis version of Sonic 3D Blast was generally positive upon its original release. While Dan Jevons of Mean Machines Sega was initially skeptical of the first 3D Sonic game appearing on the Genesis, he proclaimed Sonic 3D Blast to be "a legitimate addition to the Sonic series, and a smart game in its own right". He and Angus Swan of the same publication were grateful for the change in gameplay style, which they said added depth to the structure of the series formula. They additionally praised the music, controls, and sense of inertia in Sonic's movement. Ed Lomas of Computer and Video Games considered Sonic 3D Blast to be "the first essential Mega Drive game in years", and remarked that the new gameplay style would appeal to all fans of the series, as well as those who "couldn't be bothered with running right all the time". Although Art Angel of GamePro considered the levels cleverly designed, he was initially frustrated by the isometric perspective, which he felt steepened the learning curve for the controls; Dan Hsu of Electronic Gaming Monthly experienced a similar adjusting period. Shawn Smith and Sushi-X, also of Electronic Gaming Monthly, admired the size of the levels, though Hsu wished for a map due to becoming sidetracked on occasion, and found the level designs too similar. Lomas and Electronic Gaming Monthly's Crispin Boyer observed a lack of secret locations to discover in relation to previous Sonic entries, which the former felt lowered the replay value. Jevons and Swan regarded the difficulty as somewhat low for experienced gamers, with Art Angel likewise finding the game easy to beat upon mastering the controls, whereas Lomas deemed it to be harder and longer than most other Sonic titles. The reviewers of Game Informer were unanimously underwhelmed, with the consensus that the game was enjoyable but not outstanding.

The graphics were widely praised, with Lomas finding the game's rendered intro and fluid animation impressive for the console. Art Angel additionally noted that the sprites and animations never glitch regardless of the action's intensity. Smith and Hsu deemed the game the pinnacle of the Genesis's capabilities in terms of its color palette and sense of 3D. While the Mean Machines Sega reviewers and Lomas found the checkerboard floor patterns repetitive, Lomas deemed them necessary for judging difficult sections correctly. Art Angel approved of the eclectic music selection, which he described as ranging from techno pop to contemporary jazz, and the Mean Machines Sega reviewers cited the remixes for the second act of each stage as a positive point. Mike Wallis, an employee of Sega at the time, recalled in an interview that the Genesis version was successful for the company, eventually selling over 700,000 copies. Later in 2015, he stated it sold over a million copies. Electronic Gaming Monthly named Sonic 3D Blast a runner-up for Genesis Game of the Year (behind Vectorman 2).

Reception to the Saturn version was mixed. Though Lee Nutter of Sega Saturn Magazine compared the gameplay unfavorably to previous Sonic games, he found it had a great deal of fun to offer and praised it as being more challenging than any previous Sonic game. Game Informer, describing the title's feel as "a 3D game with 2D tricks and playstyle", felt that the gameplay was uninspired, and suggested that the game should be rented first. GameSpot's Jeff Gerstmann appreciated this version's superior handling of certain animations. Entertainment Weekly, however, noted the game's unusually similar presentation on two platforms with differing expectations, claiming that "while 3D Blast is super by 16-bit standards, it falls flat on Sega Saturn, where 32-bit games with far more sophisticated 3-D graphics and gameplay are the norm." Smith and Hsu of Electronic Gaming Monthly agreed that the Saturn version is overly similar to the Genesis version, though Hsu added, "that's a compliment to the Genesis, not a rip on the Saturn". Hsu and Boyer both also said that the game's controls are considerably improved with the Saturn's analog controller, though Sushi-X found it of little help. The Saturn version was also a commercial success and was one of the system's better-selling games, according to Wallis.

The staff of GameSpot saw the PC version as similar to the others, but pointed out some slowdown effects while the camera scrolled, attributing these to its wide colour palette.

=== Retrospective ===
Retrospective reviews

Aggregate score
Aggregator	Score
GameRankings	SAT: 67% GEN: 59%

Review scores
Publication	Score
AllGame	GEN: 3.5/5
Eurogamer	GEN: 6/10
GameRevolution	SAT: C+
GameSpot	GEN: 4/10
IGN	GEN: 6/10
Nintendo Life	GEN: 6/10

Critical opinions of the game have worsened over time. Reviewers generally disapproved of Sonic 3D Blast's gameplay style, some finding its isometric perspective limiting. Lucas M. Thomas of IGN lamented that "the sense of speed and intense action that Sonic's name was built on is absent here, replaced by, essentially, a looping, lazy fetchquest". Austin Shau of GameSpot echoed this concern, calling the gameplay "an exercise in tedium". Besides the game's goals, Shau and Thomas criticized the controls, particularly in the area of Sonic's overly slow-paced movement and slippery deceleration. Thomas did admit that the game "has its moments" of quick-footed vigor, but characterized these as few and far between, and Shau summarized that, while not unsalvageable in isolation, the game's elements violently clashed and customers would be "spending 800 Wii points for a vat of oil and water". Damien McFerran of Nintendo Life stated that its repetition was broken only by its boss battles and special stages, the latter of which Shau wrote off as "childishly easy". However, reflecting on its complaints years earlier upon the game's inclusion in Sonic Mega Collection Plus, Jeremy Parish of 1UP.com called the game "much better than you might be led to believe". Brett Alan Weiss of AllGame voiced a similar opinion, feeling it was a "nice departure" from the style of the side-scrolling Sonic games.

Reviewers remained positive about the game's presentation. McFerran greatly enjoyed the game's visuals and welcomed the graphical improvements of the Saturn version: "the CGI visuals are stunning considering the hardware, the animation is excellent and the level design is colourful and varied". Thomas praised the game's "valiant" pre-rendered graphics, especially taking its limited hardware into account. Shau stated that the graphics and sound were the only areas in which the game bore a welcome resemblance to its Genesis predecessors, and particularly appreciated the return of the ring-scattering sound effect and similar music. Z-Roc of Game Revolution praised the rounded, cartoon-like graphics, referring to them as "some of the sharpest graphics we have ever seen." Weiss wrote that the visuals, though not an improvement from other games artistically, were well-produced and high-quality. Thomas gave the music a subscore of 7.5/10, the highest of any element of the game, and noted that its themes would be memorable to players.

Some journalists have called Sonic 3D Blast one of the worst games in the Sonic franchise. USgamer and Complex Networks wrote that the game did not feel like a true Sonic game, the latter stating that it was "offensive" to call it 3D. PC Gamer described it as "the first sign that Sonic in 3D was just plain not going to work". The game is remembered as a black sheep in the franchise.

== Legacy ==
Archie Comics published a comic book adaptation of Sonic 3D Blast for a 48-page special in December 1996, written by Mike Gallagher. A loose adaptation of the game also appeared in issues 104 through 106 (May through July 1997) of Sonic the Comic.

Senoue re-arranged two of his musical pieces from the Genesis version for Sonic Adventure (1998), saying he wanted the Japanese market to hear them as the Genesis version was not released in Japan. He also used a cut theme as the boss theme in Sonic the Hedgehog 4: Episode I (2010).

After Sonic 3D Blast, Traveller's Tales and Sonic Team collaborated again on the Saturn racing game Sonic R (1997). Sonic 3D Blast was one of Traveller's Tales earliest games; the studio later became known for their work on video games based on the Lego toy line, through which it would revisit the Sonic franchise as part of the 2015 crossover game Lego Dimensions. In 2017, Burton released an unofficial director's cut patch for the Mega Drive version of Sonic 3D Blast, with improved controls and additions such as a level editor, a password save system, time attack challenges, and the ability to transform into Super Sonic.
