= Saturday Morning Apocalypse =

Studio album by Powerglove
- Released: September 28, 2010
- Recorded: 2009–2010
- Genre: Power metal, speed metal, video game music
- Length: 45:34
- Label: E1 Music
- Producer: Powerglove

Powerglove chronology
| Metal Kombat for the Mortal Man (2007) | Saturday Morning Apocalypse (2010) | TV Game Metal (2012) |

Professional ratings
Review scores
| Source | Rating |
|---|---|
| Allmusic | 3.5/5 stars |

Saturday Morning Apocalypse is the second studio album by the metal/power metal band Powerglove, released on September 28, 2010, by E1 Music. It strays from Powerglove's usual brand of video game metal, and instead centers around TV, cartoon and movie themes that the band grew up with. This is the band's first release on E1 Music. A music video for "Batman" was released on July 28, 2011.

== Track listing ==
All songs arranged and remixed by Powerglove.

| No. | Title | Writer(s) | Length |
|---|---|---|---|
| 1. | "X-Men" (X-Men) | Haim Saban, Shuki Levy | 3:39 |
| 2. | "Gotta Catch Em All" (Pokémon) | John Siegler, John Loeffler | 3:35 |
| 3. | "The Real Adventures of Johnny Quest" (The Real Adventures of Jonny Quest) | Gary Lionelli, William Hanna, Hoyt Curtin, Joseph Barbera | 3:20 |
| 4. | "This Is Halloween" (The Nightmare Before Christmas) | Danny Elfman | 3:53 |
| 5. | "Batman" (Batman) | Danny Elfman | 5:27 |
| 6. | "Transformers" (The Transformers: The Movie) | Anne Bryant, Ford Kinder | 5:07 |
| 7. | "Inspector Gadget" (Inspector Gadget) | L. Perry, S. Lincoln | 4:45 |
| 8. | "Heffalumps and Woozles (Winnie the Pooh)" (Winnie the Pooh and the Blustery Day) | Robert B. Sherman, Richard M. Sherman | 4:27 |
| 9. | "The Simpsons" (The Simpsons; feat. Tony Kakko) | Danny Elfman | 3:32 |
| 10. | "The Flintstones" (The Flintstones) | William Hanna, Hoyt Curtin, Joseph Barbera | 4:12 |
| 11. | "Gotta Catch Em All" (Pokémon; feat. Tony Kakko) | John Siegler, John Loeffler | 3:37 |

A cover of "Under the Sea" from Disney's The Little Mermaid was planned to be included, but Disney denied the band rights to release the song. It was later included on 2018 album Continue? with Marc Hudson of DragonForce. Additionally, the band had wanted to release covers of the theme-songs to the following television series, but were not able to: Captain Planet and the Planeteers ThunderCats, and Tiny Toon Adventures

== Personnel ==
- Chris Marchiel — guitar
- Nick Avila — bass guitar
- Bassil Silver — drums
- Alex Berkson — guitar
- Engineered, mixed and mastered by Bassil Silver
- Produced by Powerglove
- Synthesizers by Powerglove
- Tony Kakko — guest vocals and harmonies on "The Simpsons" and "Gotta Catch Em All"
- Front, back and inside cover art by Dave Rapoza, layout by Chris Marchiel
