= Kōtarō Nakamura (voice actor) =

Japanese voice actor (born 1963)

- 中村 浩太郎
- Born: May 24, 1963 (age 63); Ishikawa Prefecture, Japan
- Occupation: Voice actor
- Years active: 2000–present
- Agent: Production Ace
- Known for: Voice of Doctor Eggman in the Sonic the Hedgehog franchise
- Notable work: Sonic Prime as Doctor Eggman; Sazae-san as Nanbutsu Isasaka; One Piece as Yarisugi; Space Battleship Yamato 2199 as Ghader Talan
- Website: Official profile

Kōtarō Nakamura (中村 浩太郎, Nakamura Kōtarō; born May 24, 1963) is a Japanese voice actor from Ishikawa Prefecture affiliated with Production Ace. He is also the organizer of the voice actors' joint independent training session known as Camp V.

He is best known for his roles as Doctor Eggman in the Sonic the Hedgehog franchise, Nanbutsu Isasaka in the long-running television anime Sazae-san, Yarisugi in One Piece, and Ghader Talan in Space Battleship Yamato 2199.

He also served as the Japanese dub voice of Stanley "Stan" Pines in Gravity Falls and Megatron in the Transformers films.

== Biography ==
Nakamura was born on May 24, 1963 in Ishikawa Prefecture.

His career in the voice acting industry began with an aspiration to become a horse racing announcer.

In Sazae-san, he portrayed the role of Nanbutsu Isasaka starting late 2009, succeeding the late Yasuo Iwata. In 2023, he stepped down from the role due to an emergency hospitalization, which caused him to enter long-term medical treatment. His final performance as the character aired on July 30 of that year, with Shigeru Ushiyama succeeding in the role.

Following the death of Chikao Ōtsuka, Nakamura took over the role of Sonic series antagonist Doctor Eggman starting with Mario & Sonic at the Rio 2016 Olympic Games. In 2024, it was announced that, due to ill health, he would take a hiatus from voice acting and did not return to voice Doctor Eggman, Mr. Doctor Eggman and Doctor Done-It for the third season of Sonic Prime.

== Personal life ==
Nakamura's personal hobbies and skills include bowling, baseball, table tennis, softball, singing, horse racing, and reading aloud. He speaks in the Kanazawa and Kansai dialects.

== Filmography ==
=== Television animation ===
List of voice performances in television animation
Year	Title	Role	Notes	Source
2005	Blood+	Additional voice	Ep. 46	
2006	Government Crime Investigation Agent Zaizen Jotaro	Mitsuru Ogaki		
2007	Ikki Tousen: Dragon Destiny	Shungai Chōkō		
2007	Shinkyoku Sōkai Polyphonica	Hadaki	Eps 2 and 10	
2007	Potemayo	Mikan's father, Headmaster		
2008	Chiko, Heiress of the Phantom Thief	Skipper	Main role; Eps 1–6	
2009	Sazae-san	Nanbutsu Isasaka	Fourth voice	
2010	Demon King Daimao	Keizō Teruya	Eps 9-11	
2011	Gosick	Middle-Aged Guest B	Eps 2–3	
2012	Saint Seiya Omega	Zenzō Masataka Morigakure VII		
2013	One Piece	Yarisugi, Peachbeard, Bonk Punch		
2013	Space Battleship Yamato 2199	Ghader Talan		
2014	JoJo's Bizarre Adventure: Stardust Crusaders	Officer A	Ep. 1	
2015	Classroom Crisis	board member 2	Eps 1 and 13	
2016	Dragon Ball Super	Boss	Ep. 71	
2017	Chibi Maruko-chan	Kiyoshi		
2018	Lupin the 3rd Part 5	U.S. President	Ep. 24	
2019	Midnight Occult Civil Servants	Haguro	Ep. 4	
2020	Great Detective Conan	Raita Oide	Eps 990–991	
2022	Shin Ikki Tousen	Shungai Chōkō	Ep. 1	

=== Theatrical animation ===
List of voice performances in theatrical animation
Year	Title	Role	Notes	Source
2021	Star Blazers: Space Battleship Yamato 2205 Opening Chapter: Takeoff	Ghader Talan		
2022	Star Blazers: Space Battleship Yamato 2205 Closing Chapter: Stasha	Ghader Talan		
2022	One Piece Film: Red	Bonk Punch		

=== Original video animation (OVA) ===
List of voice performances in original video animation
Year	Title	Role	Notes	Source
2007	Hellsing Ultimate	Wild Geese Adjutant	Ep. 3	
2012	Ippatsu Hicchuu!! Devander	Duke Oasis		

=== Video games ===
List of voice performances in video games
Year	Title	Role	Notes	Source
2016	Mario & Sonic at the Rio 2016 Olympic Games	Doctor Eggman		
2016	Sonic Boom: Fire & Ice	Doctor Eggman		
2017	Sonic Forces	Doctor Eggman		
2019	Team Sonic Racing	Doctor Eggman		
2022	Sonic Frontiers	Doctor Eggman		
2024	Sonic x Shadow Generations	Doctor Eggman, Professor Gerald Robotnik		

=== Dubbing ===
==== Live-action ====
List of voice performances in live-action dubbing
Year	Title	Role	Notes	Source
2007	Transformers	Megatron (Hugo Weaving)		

==== Animation ====
List of voice performances in animation dubbing
Year	Title	Role	Notes	Source
2009	Star Wars: The Clone Wars	Orn Free Taa (Phil LaMarr)		
2012	Gravity Falls	Stanley "Stan" Pines (Alex Hirsch)	Main role	
2012	Ultimate Spider-Man	Arnim Zola (Mark Hamill)		
2016	Lego Star Wars: Droid Tales	General Grievous (Kirby Morrow)		
2017	Sonic Boom	Doctor Eggman (Mike Pollock)	Main role	
2022	Wendell & Wild	Manberg (Igal Naor)	Main role	
2022	Sonic Prime	Doctor Eggman, Mr. Doctor Eggman, Doctor Done-It (Brian Drummond)	First voice	
