= Deem Bristow =

American actor (1947–2005)

- Born: Deem Reginald Bristow; April 11, 1947; Eaton, Ohio, U.S.
- Died: January 15, 2005 (aged 57); San Diego, California, U.S.
- Other name: Reg Green
- Education: Wright State University
- Occupation: Actor
- Years active: 1970–2005
- Notable credit: Sonic the Hedgehog as Doctor Eggman

Deem Reginald Bristow (April 11, 1947 – January 15, 2005) was an American actor. He was best known for voicing Doctor Eggman, the main antagonist of the Sonic the Hedgehog video game franchise, from 1998 to 2004.

== Life and career ==
Bristow was born in Eaton, Ohio. He attended and graduated from Fairmont High School, and was vice president in his senior year. After graduating, he attended Wright State University, majoring in theatre and business administration. He originally worked as a model. He began his acting career in the 1970s, and in 1976, he appeared in Estelle Novello's play The Mousetrap. He appeared in such other plays as The Emperor's New Clothes (as the Mirror Man), Born Yesterday, Guys and Dolls, The House of Blue Leaves, and Twelfth Night. Dayton Daily News named Bristow a "show stealer" in 1979, and in 1980, he starred as Captain George Brackett in the stage play South Pacific.

Later in his career, from 1998 to 2004, Bristow voiced Doctor Eggman, the main antagonist in the Sonic the Hedgehog video game franchise. He voiced numerous characters in the anime television series R.O.D the TV, and also voiced characters in numerous video games such as The Lost Files of Sherlock Holmes: The Case of the Serrated Scalpel, Diablo II, Blue Stinger, Angel Devoid: Face of the Enemy, Die Hard Trilogy 2: Viva Las Vegas, Frogger: The Great Quest, Dungeon Lords and Call of Cthulhu: Dark Corners of the Earth. Aside from voice acting, he appeared in films such as Problem Child, Glitch!, Terminal Exposure and Freeway.

== Death ==
Bristow died of a heart attack in San Diego, California, on January 15, 2005, at the age of 57.
