= Metal Kombat for the Mortal Man =

Studio album by Powerglove
- Released: October 31, 2007
- Genre: Video game metal, power metal, speed metal
- Length: 48:44
- Producer: Powerglove

Powerglove chronology
Total Pwnage (2005)	Metal Kombat for the Mortal Man (2007)	Saturday Morning Apocalypse (2010)

Professional ratings
Review scores
Source	Rating
G4	Favorable

Metal Kombat for the Mortal Man is the debut studio album by video game metal/power metal band Powerglove released October 31, 2007. The album contains cover versions of music from various video games, similar to their previous release, Total Pwnage.

The album was recorded in various locations and mixed at the band's home studio.

== Track listing ==
All songs arranged and remixed by Powerglove.

No.	Title	Writer(s)	Length
1.	"So Sexy Robotnik" (Sonic the Hedgehog 2)	Masato Nakamura	3:47
2.	"Mario Minor" (Super Mario Bros. / Super Mario World)	Koji Kondo	3:55
3.	"Fight On" (Killer Instinct)	Robin Beanland, Graeme Norgate	6:14
4.	"Vanquish the Horrible Night" (Castlevania II / Castlevania III)	Kenichi Matsubara, Yoshinori Sasaki, Jun Funahashi, Yukie Morimoto	3:57
5.	"Blasting the Hornet" (Mega Man X3)	Kinuyo Yamashita	3:14
6.	"The Duck Grinder" (Duck Hunt)	Koji Kondo, Hirokazu Tanaka	2:20
7.	"Power, Wisdom, Courage" (The Legend of Zelda / A Link to the Past / Ocarina of Time)	Koji Kondo	5:50
8.	"Omnishred (We're Gonna Need a Bigger Sword)" (Final Fantasy VII)	Nobuo Uematsu	3:32
9.	"Holy Orders (Be Quick and Just Shred)" (Guilty Gear X)	Daisuke Ishiwatari	4:30
10.	"Metal Kombat for the Mortal Man" (Mortal Kombat / Mega Man 2)	Oliver Adams, Takashi Tateishi, Manami Matsumae, Yoshihiro Sakaguchi, Steve Jablonsky	3:36
11.	"Red Wings Over Baron" (Final Fantasy IV)	Nobuo Uematsu	7:49

== Personnel ==
- Chris Marchiel — guitar
- Alex Berkson — guitar
- Nick Avila — bass
- Bassil Silver-Hajo — drums
- Mixed by Bassil Silver-Hajo and Powerglove.
- Produced and Engineered by Powerglove.
- Matt Pigott: Guitar Solo on "Holy Orders," Synth Programming on "So Sexy Robotnik" and "Metal Kombat."
- Synths by Alex Berkson and Powerglove.
- Simon Jeker: Saxophone on "So Sexy Robotnik"
- Minor Key Transposition on "Mario Minor" by S.S.H.
- Powergirl, Front and Back Cover Art by Dave Rapoza
- Zebediah Portrait, Sprites and Layout by Chris Marchiel
