= Sonic Labyrinth =

1995 video game

- European cover art
- Developer: Minato Giken
- Publisher: Sega
- Directors: Noboru Machida; Hideaki Katagiri
- Designer: Kazuhiro Tanaka
- Composer: Atsuko Iwanaga
- Series: Sonic the Hedgehog
- Platform: Game Gear
- Release: EU: November 3, 1995; JP: November 17, 1995; NA: November 1995
- Genres: Action, puzzle
- Mode: Single-player

Sonic Labyrinth (Note: Japanese: ソニックラビリンス, Hepburn: Sonikku Rabirinsu) is a 1995 action-puzzle video game developed by Minato Giken and published by Sega for the Game Gear. The game features Sonic the Hedgehog exploring maze-like stages from an isometric perspective. Dr. Robotnik has robbed Sonic of his trademark speed, making him walk abnormally slow but still able to utilize the spin dash.

Upon release, critical reception to the game was mixed: many critics found the game a unique addition to the Sonic library but flawed by convoluted controls and repetitive gameplay. In retrospect, however, it has received generally negative reviews and is considered among the worst Sonic games ever released. Despite this, the game has been re-released multiple times in the following years.

== Gameplay ==
Sonic exploring a stage

Sonic Labyrinth is an action and puzzle game with pinball elements. It is presented in an isometric perspective, and has been compared to Marble Madness (1984). Series villain Dr. Robotnik has tricked Sonic the Hedgehog into wearing special shoes designed to rob him of his speed, so Sonic must collect the Chaos Emeralds to release the shoes from his feet.

The player controls Sonic, navigating him through maze-like stages filled with enemies and obstacles that hinder his path. Sonic walks uncharacteristically slowly, but can roll into a ball and dash across the levels to take out enemies and avoid danger. This spin dash move can be charged for extra speed and damage. Sonic must collect three keys in each stage and bring them to the goal to advance to the next level. Sometimes the keys may be hidden within enemies. The game has four zones, each containing three stages. After each set of three stages, there is a bonus round of collecting rings and a boss battle. Collecting 100 rings in the bonus round will net the player an extra life. A time attack mode is also available.

== Development and release ==
Sonic Labyrinth was developed by Minato Giken, and published by Sega. It was released in Europe on November 3, 1995, Japan on November 17, 1995, and North America the same month. The game was included in Sonic Adventure DX: Director's Cut (2003) as an unlockable bonus, and in the compilation Sonic Mega Collection Plus (2004). It was rereleased for the Nintendo 3DS's Virtual Console in Europe on May 10, 2012, followed by Japan a week later on May 16, 2012, and then in North America on June 17, 2013. It was also released along with the other 11 Game Gear Sonic games on Sonic Origins Plus in 2023.

== Reception ==
Reception

Review scores
Publication	Score
Electronic Gaming Monthly	6/10, 4/10, 4.5/10, 4.5/10
Famitsu	4/10, 6/10, 5/10, 7/10
GamePro	See note: (Note: GamePro gave component scores of 4.5 graphics, 3.5 sound, 4.0 control, and 4.5 fun factor out of 5.)
Mean Machines Sega	76%
Mega Fun	59%
Sega Magazin	81%

Critical reception to Sonic Labyrinth was mixed. Multiple reviewers wrote about difficulties controlling Sonic as he bounced wildly around the levels. Mean Machines Sega wrote that "you can get through each level with a bit of practise but you're left wondering how you did it." Electronic Gaming Monthly (EGM) did not like the game's isometric perspective, thinking it contributed to problems directing Sonic around. GamePro wrote that small screen made it occasionally difficult to see what was occurring. They did like the graphics however, as did EGM and Mean Machines Sega, the latter which thought they echoed the graphics of SegaSonic the Hedgehog (1993).

Reflecting their positive thoughts, Mega Fun thought Sonic Labyrinth featured innovative gameplay. GamePro and Famitsu both compared the game to Marble Madness. Sega Magazin thought the game was challenging with sophisticated level design. GamePro believed it was the most interesting of the recent Sonic additions to the Game Gear library. One reviewer at Mean Machines Sega thought it was a good puzzle game to play in short segments, and may be worth the time for fans of Sonic games, pinball, or puzzles. However another critic from the same magazine thought the game was frustrating and repetitive. EGM also thought the game became repetitious after a few levels and would be boring for more experienced players, although Sonic fans may enjoy it. They concluded their thoughts writing: "This title overall tried to mix the standard side-scrolling Sonic game with a worthless pinball title and failed. In turn, this one just comes up short in both playability and enjoyment, causing boredom after the first few stages."

Retrospectively, reception has been negative and is frequently described as one of the worst Sonic games. In a retrospective review, Nintendo Life gave the game a "poor" 4 out of 10 score. They criticized the controls and illogical level design, and the start-stop nature of the gameplay. They also wrote about Sonic's lack of speed when walking on foot, which they thought was baffling for a Sonic game. USgamer called it "a poor man's version of Marble Madness, taking the worst of that game and the worst of Sonic and cramming it into one title. Absolutely dire." Nintendo World Report called it "a demented version of Sonic 3D Blast", drawing similarities through its isometric style. Official Nintendo Magazine called it "a dreadful game with an identity crisis" and "one of the worst Sonic games ever".
