= SDI (1987 video game) =

1987 video game

- Arcade flyer
- Developer: Sega R&D1
- Publishers: Sega; Home computers Activision
- Platforms: Arcade, Master System, Atari ST, Commodore 64, ZX Spectrum, Amiga, Amstrad CPC
- Release: April 1987: Arcade; JP: April 1987; NA: 1987 Master System; JP: October 24, 1987; NA/PAL: March 1988 Atari ST, C64, ZX Spectrum; EU: 1988 Amiga, CPC; EU: 1989
- Genre: Scrolling shooter
- Modes: Single-player, multiplayer

SDI: Strategic Defense Initiative, or simply SDI, is a 1987 horizontally scrolling shooter video game developed and published by Sega for arcades. It was ported to the Master System (released in North America and Europe under the name Global Defense), Amiga, Amstrad CPC, Atari ST, Commodore 64, and ZX Spectrum. Players control a satellite and must destroy enemies by moving a crosshair over them and firing the satellite's weapons.

== Gameplay ==
Players control a Strategic Defense Initiative satellite orbiting the Earth and must destroy enemy missiles/satellites with its weapons, and when activated the satellite's weapon systems fire at the crosshair present onscreen during play. The arcade version features a joystick to control the satellite and a trackball to control the crosshair. Home computer versions use different control schemes, such as depressing the fire button to control the crosshair, alternating between controlling the satellite and its weapons. It is also possible to use a joystick and mouse in combination to control the satellite and crosshair at the same time, emulating the arcade game's controls.

Each stage is split into two sections: offensive mode and defensive mode. During offensive mode, the player engages a number of enemies with the aim of destroying them all without the satellite being destroyed by the enemy. Should the player destroy all enemies during offensive mode, they are awarded 20,000 bonus points and begin the next stage on the offensive. If any enemies evade destruction during offensive mode, the player must complete defensive mode, where they are tasked with protecting the homeland from incoming warheads. Completion of defensive mode advances the player to the next stage, where they go on the offensive again.

=== Etymology ===
The real Strategic Defense Initiative was colloquially known as the Star Wars program and proposed by U.S. President Ronald Reagan in 1983 to promote defensive weaponry that could shoot ICBMs out of space.

== Reception ==
In Japan, Game Machine listed SDI as the sixth most successful table arcade unit of May 1987.
